= 2015 24H Series =

Motor racing season

Seasons
- ← none 2016 →

The 2015 24H Series powered by Hankook was the first season of the 24H Series with drivers battling for championship points and titles. It also marked the first season with official FIA International Series’ status. Dutch agency Creventic, the organiser and promoter of the series, organises 24-hour and 12-hour races since 2006, but the first year with multiple races was 2008 and therefore 2008 is officially the first season of the 24H Series, so this is the eighth season of the series. The races were contested with GT3-spec cars, GT4-spec cars, sports cars, touring cars and 24H-Specials, like silhouette cars.

== Calendar ==
Round	Event	Circuit	Date
1	24H Dubai	Dubai Autodrome, Dubai, United Arab Emirates	8–10 January
2	12H Italy-Mugello	Mugello Circuit, Scarperia e San Piero, Italy	13–14 March
3	12H Zandvoort	Circuit Park Zandvoort, Zandvoort, Netherlands	29–30 May
4	24H Paul Ricard	Paul Ricard Circuit, Le Castellet, France	10–12 July
5	24H Barcelona	Circuit de Barcelona-Catalunya, Montmeló, Spain	4–6 September
6	12H Epilog Brno	Brno Circuit, Brno, Czech Republic	9–10 October

== Entry list ==
Team	Car	No.	Drivers	Rounds
A6 (Note: The A6 class was divided into an A6-Pro class and an A6-Am class, but those were put together into one A6 class from the 12H Zandvoort (Rnd 3) on.)
(Switzerland) Stadler Motorsport	Porsche 997 GT3 R	1	(Switzerland) Adrian Amstutz	1–2
(Switzerland) Stadler Motorsport	Porsche 997 GT3 R	1	(Switzerland) Mark Ineichen	1–2
(Switzerland) Stadler Motorsport	Porsche 997 GT3 R	1	(Switzerland) Rolf Ineichen	1–2
(Switzerland) Stadler Motorsport	Porsche 997 GT3 R	1	(Germany) Christian Engelhart	1
(Germany) Black Falcon (Note: Car No. 2 entered as Black Falcon and car No. 3 entered as Abu Dhabi Racing Black Falcon.) (United Arab Emirates) Abu Dhabi Racing Black Falcon	Mercedes-Benz SLS AMG GT3	2	(Netherlands) Yelmer Buurman	1
(Germany) Black Falcon (United Arab Emirates) Abu Dhabi Racing Black Falcon	Mercedes-Benz SLS AMG GT3	2	(Saudi Arabia) Abdulaziz Al Faisal	1
(Germany) Black Falcon (United Arab Emirates) Abu Dhabi Racing Black Falcon	Mercedes-Benz SLS AMG GT3	2	(Germany) Hubert Haupt	1
(Germany) Black Falcon (United Arab Emirates) Abu Dhabi Racing Black Falcon	Mercedes-Benz SLS AMG GT3	2	(United Kingdom) Oliver Webb	1
(Germany) Black Falcon (United Arab Emirates) Abu Dhabi Racing Black Falcon	Mercedes-Benz SLS AMG GT3	3	(Netherlands) Jeroen Bleekemolen	1
(Germany) Black Falcon (United Arab Emirates) Abu Dhabi Racing Black Falcon	Mercedes-Benz SLS AMG GT3	3	(Germany) Bernd Schneider	1
(Germany) Black Falcon (United Arab Emirates) Abu Dhabi Racing Black Falcon	Mercedes-Benz SLS AMG GT3	3	(Sweden) Andreas Simonsen	1
(Germany) Black Falcon (United Arab Emirates) Abu Dhabi Racing Black Falcon	Mercedes-Benz SLS AMG GT3	3	(United Arab Emirates) Khaled Al Qubaisi	1
(Austria) HP Racing	Mercedes-Benz SLS AMG GT3	2	(Austria) Hari Proczyk	3–5
(Austria) HP Racing	Mercedes-Benz SLS AMG GT3	2	(Germany) Reinhold Renger	3–5
(Austria) HP Racing	Mercedes-Benz SLS AMG GT3	2	(Germany) Carsten Tilke	3–4, 6
(Austria) HP Racing	Mercedes-Benz SLS AMG GT3	2	(Germany) Bernd Schneider	3, 5
(Austria) HP Racing	Mercedes-Benz SLS AMG GT3	2	(Austria) Reinhard Kofler	4–5
(Austria) HP Racing	Mercedes-Benz SLS AMG GT3	2	(Netherlands) Jeroen Bleekemolen	4
(Austria) HP Racing	Mercedes-Benz SLS AMG GT3	2	(United States) Sean Johnston	5
(Austria) HP Racing	Mercedes-Benz SLS AMG GT3	2	(Germany) Nico Bastian	6
(Austria) HP Racing	Mercedes-Benz SLS AMG GT3	2	(Germany) Hubert Haupt	6
(Austria) HP Racing	Mercedes-Benz SLS AMG GT3	2	(Austria) Markus Weege	6
(Germany) Walkenhorst Motorsport	BMW Z4 GT3	3	(Germany) Henry Walkenhorst	2, 5
(Germany) Walkenhorst Motorsport	BMW Z4 GT3	3	(Germany) Christian Bollrath	2
(Germany) Walkenhorst Motorsport	BMW Z4 GT3	3	(Germany) Felipe Fernández Laser	2
(Germany) Walkenhorst Motorsport	BMW Z4 GT3	3	(Finland) Matias Henkola	5
(Germany) Walkenhorst Motorsport	BMW Z4 GT3	3	(Germany) Jens Klingmann	5
(Germany) Walkenhorst Motorsport	BMW Z4 GT3	3	(United States) Chris Tiger	5
(Czech Republic) Scuderia Praha (Note: Entered with car No. 11 instead of No. 4 at the 12H Epilog Brno (Rnd 6).)	Ferrari 458 GT3	4	(Czech Republic) Jaromír Jiřík	All
(Czech Republic) Scuderia Praha	Ferrari 458 GT3	4	(Czech Republic) Jiří Písařík	All
(Czech Republic) Scuderia Praha	Ferrari 458 GT3	4	(Italy) Matteo Malucelli	1–2, 4–6
(Czech Republic) Scuderia Praha	Ferrari 458 GT3	4	(Netherlands) Peter Kox	1, 3–6
(Germany) Car Collection Motorsport	Mercedes-Benz SLS AMG GT3	5	(Germany) Peter Schmidt	1–3, 5–6
(Germany) Car Collection Motorsport	Mercedes-Benz SLS AMG GT3	5	(Germany) Johannes Siegler	1–3, 5
(Germany) Car Collection Motorsport	Mercedes-Benz SLS AMG GT3	5	(Germany) Heinz Schmersal	1–2
(Germany) Car Collection Motorsport	Mercedes-Benz SLS AMG GT3	5	(Liechtenstein) Patrik Kaiser	1
(Germany) Car Collection Motorsport	Mercedes-Benz SLS AMG GT3	5	(Germany) Ingo Vogler	1
(Germany) Car Collection Motorsport	Mercedes-Benz SLS AMG GT3	5	(Norway) Wiggo Dalmo	2
(Germany) Car Collection Motorsport	Mercedes-Benz SLS AMG GT3	5	(Germany) Dirg Parhofer	3, 6
(Germany) Car Collection Motorsport	Mercedes-Benz SLS AMG GT3	5	(Germany) Tim Müller	3
(Germany) Car Collection Motorsport	Mercedes-Benz SLS AMG GT3	5	(Netherlands) Rik Breukers	5
(Germany) Car Collection Motorsport	Mercedes-Benz SLS AMG GT3	5	(Germany) Alexander Mattschull	5
(Germany) Car Collection Motorsport	Mercedes-Benz SLS AMG GT3	5	(Netherlands) Renger van der Zande	5
(Germany) Car Collection Motorsport	Mercedes-Benz SLS AMG GT3	5	(Germany) Norbert Pauels	6
(Germany) Car Collection Motorsport	Mercedes-Benz SLS AMG GT3	5	(Austria) Karl Wendlinger	6
(Germany) Car Collection Motorsport	Mercedes-Benz SLS AMG GT3	27	(Germany) Pierre Ehret	1
(Germany) Car Collection Motorsport	Mercedes-Benz SLS AMG GT3	27	(Germany) Jürgen Krebs	1
(Germany) Car Collection Motorsport	Mercedes-Benz SLS AMG GT3	27	(Germany) Tim Müller	1
(Germany) Car Collection Motorsport	Mercedes-Benz SLS AMG GT3	27	(Germany) Dirg Parhofer	1
(Germany) Car Collection Motorsport	Mercedes-Benz SLS AMG GT3	27	(Germany) Norbert Pauels	1
(Germany) Car Collection Motorsport	Mercedes-Benz SLS AMG GT3	27	(Germany) Josef Klüber	2
(Germany) Car Collection Motorsport	Mercedes-Benz SLS AMG GT3	27	(Germany) Peter Schmidt	2
(Germany) Car Collection Motorsport	Mercedes-Benz SLS AMG GT3	27	(Luxembourg) "Maximilian Stein"	2
(Germany) Car Collection Motorsport	Mercedes-Benz SLS AMG GT3	27	(Germany) Gustav Edelhoff	3–5
(Germany) Car Collection Motorsport	Mercedes-Benz SLS AMG GT3	27	(Germany) Elmar Grimm	3–5
(Germany) Car Collection Motorsport	Mercedes-Benz SLS AMG GT3	27	(Germany) Ingo Vogler	3–5
(Germany) Car Collection Motorsport	Mercedes-Benz SLS AMG GT3	27	(Germany) Heinz Schmersal	3, 5
(Germany) Car Collection Motorsport	Mercedes-Benz SLS AMG GT3	27	(Germany) Johannes Kirchhoff	4–5
(Belgium) Gravity Racing International	Mercedes-Benz SLS AMG GT3	6	(Luxembourg) Gérard Lopez	1, 4
(Belgium) Gravity Racing International	Mercedes-Benz SLS AMG GT3	6	(Luxembourg) Eric Lux	1, 4
(Belgium) Gravity Racing International	Mercedes-Benz SLS AMG GT3	6	(Belgium) Vincent Radermecker	1, 4
(Belgium) Gravity Racing International	Mercedes-Benz SLS AMG GT3	6	(United Kingdom) Andy Ruhan	1
(Belgium) Gravity Racing International	Mercedes-Benz SLS AMG GT3	6	(Belgium) Loris de Sordi	1
(Belgium) Gravity Racing International	Mercedes-Benz SLS AMG GT3	6	(Czech Republic) Jaroslav Janiš	4
(Germany) HB Racing Team Herberth	Porsche 997 GT3 R	7	(Switzerland) Daniel Allemann	2–6
(Germany) HB Racing Team Herberth	Porsche 997 GT3 R	7	(Germany) Alfred Renauer	2–6
(Germany) HB Racing Team Herberth	Porsche 997 GT3 R	7	(Germany) Ralf Bohn	2, 5–6
(Germany) HB Racing Team Herberth	Porsche 997 GT3 R	7	(Germany) Robert Renauer	2, 5
(Germany) HB Racing Team Herberth	Porsche 997 GT3 R	7	(Austria) Herbert Handlos	3–6
(Germany) HB Racing Team Herberth	Porsche 997 GT3 R	7	(France) Nicolas Armindo	4
(Germany) HB Racing Team Herberth	Porsche 997 GT3 R	7	(Germany) Lukas Schreier	4
(United Kingdom) Triple Eight Racing	BMW Z4 GT3	8	(Belgium) Jacques Duyver	1
(United Kingdom) Triple Eight Racing	BMW Z4 GT3	8	(United Kingdom) Charlie Hollings	1
(United Kingdom) Triple Eight Racing	BMW Z4 GT3	8	(United Kingdom) Lee Mowle	1
(United Kingdom) Triple Eight Racing	BMW Z4 GT3	8	(United Kingdom) Joe Osborne	1
(Switzerland) Hofor-Racing	Mercedes-Benz SLS AMG GT3	9	(Switzerland) Roland Eggimann	1–3, 6
(Switzerland) Hofor-Racing	Mercedes-Benz SLS AMG GT3	9	(Netherlands) Christiaan Frankenhout	1–3, 6
(Switzerland) Hofor-Racing	Mercedes-Benz SLS AMG GT3	9	(Germany) Kenneth Heyer	1–3, 6
(Switzerland) Hofor-Racing	Mercedes-Benz SLS AMG GT3	9	(Switzerland) Michael Kroll	1–3, 6
(Switzerland) Hofor-Racing	Mercedes-Benz SLS AMG GT3	9	(Germany) Roland Rehfeld	1
(Switzerland) Hofor-Racing	Mercedes-Benz SLS AMG GT3	9	(Switzerland) Chantal Kroll	2–3
(Switzerland) Hofor-Racing	Mercedes-Benz SLS AMG GT3	9	(Germany) Sebastian Asch	6
(Switzerland) Hofor-Racing	Mercedes-Benz SLS AMG GT3	10	(Netherlands) Christiaan Frankenhout	2–6
(Switzerland) Hofor-Racing	Mercedes-Benz SLS AMG GT3	10	(Germany) Kenneth Heyer	2–6
(Switzerland) Hofor-Racing	Mercedes-Benz SLS AMG GT3	10	(Switzerland) Michael Kroll	2–6
(Switzerland) Hofor-Racing	Mercedes-Benz SLS AMG GT3	10	(Switzerland) Roland Eggimann	2–5
(Switzerland) Hofor-Racing	Mercedes-Benz SLS AMG GT3	10	(Switzerland) Chantal Kroll	2, 4–6
(Switzerland) Hofor-Racing	Mercedes-Benz SLS AMG GT3	10	(Germany) Sebastian Asch	6
(Russia) GT Russian Team	Mercedes-Benz SLS AMG GT3	10	(Estonia) Marko Asmer	1
(Russia) GT Russian Team	Mercedes-Benz SLS AMG GT3	10	(United Arab Emirates) Karim Al Azhari	1
(Russia) GT Russian Team	Mercedes-Benz SLS AMG GT3	10	(Estonia) Kevin Korjus	1
(Russia) GT Russian Team	Mercedes-Benz SLS AMG GT3	10	(Russia) Aleksey Vasilyev	1
(Switzerland) Fach Auto Tech	Porsche 997 GT3 R	11	(Switzerland) Heinz Arnold	1
(Switzerland) Fach Auto Tech	Porsche 997 GT3 R	11	(Switzerland) Heinz Bruder	1
(Switzerland) Fach Auto Tech	Porsche 997 GT3 R	11	(Italy) Matteo Cairoli	1
(Switzerland) Fach Auto Tech	Porsche 997 GT3 R	11	(Switzerland) Erwin Keller	1
(Switzerland) Fach Auto Tech	Porsche 997 GT3 R	11	(Switzerland) Marcel Wagner	1
(Switzerland) Fach Auto Tech	Porsche 997 GT3 R	12	(Germany) Otto Klohs	1
(Switzerland) Fach Auto Tech	Porsche 997 GT3 R	12	(Germany) Sven Müller	1
(Switzerland) Fach Auto Tech	Porsche 997 GT3 R	12	(Austria) Martin Ragginger	1
(Switzerland) Fach Auto Tech	Porsche 997 GT3 R	12	(Germany) Jens Richter	1
(Switzerland) Glorax Racing	Ferrari 458 GT3	15	(Russia) Andrey Birzhin	1
(Switzerland) Glorax Racing	Ferrari 458 GT3	15	(Greece) Dimitri Deverikos	1
(Switzerland) Glorax Racing	Ferrari 458 GT3	15	(Italy) Gabriele Lancieri	1
(Switzerland) Glorax Racing	Ferrari 458 GT3	15	(Italy) Rino Mastronardi	1
(Switzerland) Glorax Racing	Ferrari 458 GT3	15	(Spain) Isaac Tutumlu	1
(United Kingdom) Simpson Motorsport	Audi R8 LMS ultra	16	(United Kingdom) Peter Cook	3–4
(United Kingdom) Simpson Motorsport	Audi R8 LMS ultra	16	(France) Franck Pelle	3–4
(United Kingdom) Simpson Motorsport	Audi R8 LMS ultra	16	(United Kingdom) Stephen Ritchie	3
(United Kingdom) Simpson Motorsport	Audi R8 LMS ultra	16	(Germany) Christer Jöns	4
(United Kingdom) Simpson Motorsport	Audi R8 LMS ultra	16	(United Kingdom) Adam Sharpe	4
(United Kingdom) Preci - Spark	Mercedes-Benz SLS AMG GT3	18	(United Kingdom) David Jones	1
(United Kingdom) Preci - Spark	Mercedes-Benz SLS AMG GT3	18	(United Kingdom) Gareth Jones	1
(United Kingdom) Preci - Spark	Mercedes-Benz SLS AMG GT3	18	(United Kingdom) Godfrey Jones	1
(United Kingdom) Preci - Spark	Mercedes-Benz SLS AMG GT3	18	(United Kingdom) Morgan Jones	1
(United Kingdom) Preci - Spark	Mercedes-Benz SLS AMG GT3	18	(United Kingdom) Philip Jones	1
(Netherlands) V8 Racing	Chevrolet Corvette C6.R ZR1	19	(Netherlands) Rick Abresch	1
(Netherlands) V8 Racing	Chevrolet Corvette C6.R ZR1	19	(Netherlands) Alex van 't Hoff	1
(Netherlands) V8 Racing	Chevrolet Corvette C6.R ZR1	19	(Netherlands) Nicky Pastorelli	1
(Netherlands) V8 Racing	Chevrolet Corvette C6.R ZR1	19	(Netherlands) Wolf Nathan	1
(Netherlands) V8 Racing	Chevrolet Corvette C6.R ZR1	19	(Portugal) Miguel Ramos	1
(Netherlands) V8 Racing	Mercedes-Benz SLS AMG GT3	19	(Netherlands) Rick Abresch	2
(Netherlands) V8 Racing	Mercedes-Benz SLS AMG GT3	19	(Netherlands) Alex van 't Hoff	2
(Netherlands) V8 Racing	Mercedes-Benz SLS AMG GT3	19	(Netherlands) Francesco Pastorelli	2
(Germany) Leipert Motorsport	Lamborghini Gallardo FL2	22	(Austria) Ernst Kirchmayr	1
(Germany) Leipert Motorsport	Lamborghini Gallardo FL2	22	(Austria) Reinhard Kofler	1
(Germany) Leipert Motorsport	Lamborghini Gallardo FL2	22	(Canada) Jean-Charles Perrin	1
(Germany) Leipert Motorsport	Lamborghini Gallardo FL2	22	(Germany) Harald Schlotter	1
(Germany) Leipert Motorsport	Lamborghini Gallardo FL2	22	(United Kingdom) Adrian Watt	1
(United Kingdom) Nissan GT Academy Team RJN	Nissan GT-R Nismo GT3	23	(United States) Nicolas Hammann	1
(United Kingdom) Nissan GT Academy Team RJN	Nissan GT-R Nismo GT3	23	(Saudi Arabia) Ahmed Bin Khanen	1
(United Kingdom) Nissan GT Academy Team RJN	Nissan GT-R Nismo GT3	23	(France) Gaëtan Paletou	1
(United Kingdom) Nissan GT Academy Team RJN	Nissan GT-R Nismo GT3	23	(Mexico) Ricardo Sánchez	1
(United Kingdom) Nissan GT Academy Team RJN	Nissan GT-R Nismo GT3	23	(Germany) Florian Strauss	1
(Germany) G-Private Racing	Mercedes-Benz SLS AMG GT3	24	(Switzerland) Adrian Zumstein	6
(Germany) G-Private Racing	Mercedes-Benz SLS AMG GT3	24	(Switzerland) Manuel Zumstein	6
(Germany) G-Private Racing	Mercedes-Benz SLS AMG GT3	24	(Switzerland) Philipp Zumstein	6
(United Kingdom) KPM Racing	Aston Martin Vantage GT3	28	(United Kingdom) Jonathan Adam	1
(United Kingdom) KPM Racing	Aston Martin Vantage GT3	28	(Germany) Stefan Mücke	1
(United Kingdom) KPM Racing	Aston Martin Vantage GT3	28	(United Kingdom) Paul White	1
(Spain) Drivex	Audi R8 LMS ultra	29	(Spain) Daniel Díaz-Varela	5
(Spain) Drivex	Audi R8 LMS ultra	29	(Denmark) Martin Hald Gøtsche	5
(Spain) Drivex	Audi R8 LMS ultra	29	(Denmark) René Ogrocki	5
(Spain) Drivex	Audi R8 LMS ultra	29	(United Kingdom) William Paul	5
(Spain) Drivex	Audi R8 LMS ultra	29	(Spain) Rafael Sarandeses	5
(United Kingdom) Ram Racing	Mercedes-Benz SLS AMG GT3	30	(United Kingdom) Tom Onslow-Cole	All
(United Kingdom) Ram Racing	Mercedes-Benz SLS AMG GT3	30	(United Kingdom) Adam Christodoulou	1–2, 4
(United Kingdom) Ram Racing	Mercedes-Benz SLS AMG GT3	30	(Germany) Thomas Jäger	1, 3–6
(United Kingdom) Ram Racing	Mercedes-Benz SLS AMG GT3	30	(India) Cheerag Arya	1
(United Kingdom) Ram Racing	Mercedes-Benz SLS AMG GT3	30	(United Kingdom) Paul White	2–6
(United Kingdom) Ram Racing	Mercedes-Benz SLS AMG GT3	30	(Netherlands) Jeroen Bleekemolen	5
(Czech Republic) Šenkýř Motorsport	BMW Z4 GT3	32	(Slovakia) Tomáš Erdélyi	6
(Czech Republic) Šenkýř Motorsport	BMW Z4 GT3	32	(Germany) Lennart Marioneck	6
(Czech Republic) Šenkýř Motorsport	BMW Z4 GT3	32	(Germany) Ralf Oeverhaus	6
(Czech Republic) Šenkýř Motorsport	BMW Z4 GT3	32	(Finland) Markus Palttala	6
(Czech Republic) Šenkýř Motorsport	BMW Z4 GT3	32	(Czech Republic) Robert Šenkýř	6
(Germany) SPS automotive-performance	Mercedes-Benz SLS AMG GT3	33	(Germany) Lance David Arnold	1, 4–6
(Germany) SPS automotive-performance	Mercedes-Benz SLS AMG GT3	33	(Germany) Alex Müller	1, 4–6
(Germany) SPS automotive-performance	Mercedes-Benz SLS AMG GT3	33	(Germany) Valentin Pierburg	1, 4–6
(Germany) SPS automotive-performance	Mercedes-Benz SLS AMG GT3	33	(Germany) Patrick Assenheimer	1
(Germany) SPS automotive-performance	Mercedes-Benz SLS AMG GT3	33	(Germany) Tim Müller	4–5
(Germany) Black PearL Racing by Rinaldi	Ferrari 458 GT3	66	(Germany) Pierre Kaffer	2
(Germany) Black PearL Racing by Rinaldi	Ferrari 458 GT3	66	(Germany) Steve Parrow	2
(Germany) Black PearL Racing by Rinaldi	Ferrari 458 GT3	66	(Germany) Alexander Volz	2
(San Marino) GDL Racing	Mercedes-Benz SLS AMG GT3	67	(Netherlands) Luc Braams	1–2
(San Marino) GDL Racing	Mercedes-Benz SLS AMG GT3	67	(Netherlands) Max Braams	1–2
(San Marino) GDL Racing	Mercedes-Benz SLS AMG GT3	67	(Netherlands) Duncan Huisman	1–2
(San Marino) GDL Racing	Mercedes-Benz SLS AMG GT3	67	(Germany) Johannes Waimer	1
(San Marino) GDL Racing	Mercedes-Benz SLS AMG GT3	67	(Netherlands) Ivo Breukers	3
(San Marino) GDL Racing	Mercedes-Benz SLS AMG GT3	67	(Netherlands) Rik Breukers	3
(San Marino) GDL Racing	Mercedes-Benz SLS AMG GT3	67	(Netherlands) Tom Coronel	3
(United Kingdom) Gulf Racing UK	Lamborghini Gallardo GT3	69	(United Kingdom) Jamie Campbell-Walter	1
(United Kingdom) Gulf Racing UK	Lamborghini Gallardo GT3	69	(Ivory Coast) Frédéric Fatien	1
(United Kingdom) Gulf Racing UK	Lamborghini Gallardo GT3	69	(Germany) Roald Goethe	1
(United Kingdom) Gulf Racing UK	Lamborghini Gallardo GT3	69	(United Kingdom) Stuart Hall	1
(United Arab Emirates) Dragon Racing	Ferrari 458 GT3	88	(United Kingdom) Rob Barff	1
(United Arab Emirates) Dragon Racing	Ferrari 458 GT3	88	(Republic of Ireland) Matt Griffin	1
(United Arab Emirates) Dragon Racing	Ferrari 458 GT3	88	(South Africa) Jordan Grogor	1
(United Arab Emirates) Dragon Racing	Ferrari 458 GT3	88	(Saudi Arabia) Mohammed Jawa	1
(Malaysia) Mike Racing	Mercedes-Benz SLS AMG GT3	96	(Malaysia) Rick Cheang	1
(Malaysia) Mike Racing	Mercedes-Benz SLS AMG GT3	96	(Malaysia) Joseph Chua	1
(Malaysia) Mike Racing	Mercedes-Benz SLS AMG GT3	96	(Malaysia) Michael Chua	1
(Germany) Attempto Racing	Porsche 997 GT3 R	99	(Turkey) Arkin Aka	1
(Germany) Attempto Racing	Porsche 997 GT3 R	99	(Germany) "Bill Barazetti"	1
(Germany) Attempto Racing	Porsche 997 GT3 R	99	(Germany) Bernd Kleinbach	1
(Germany) Attempto Racing	Porsche 997 GT3 R	99	(Germany) Andreas Liehm	1
(Germany) Attempto Racing	Porsche 997 GT3 R	99	(Germany) Philipp Wlazik	1
997
(Bahrain) Lechner Racing Middle East	Porsche 991 GT3 Cup	7	(Saudi Arabia) Fahad Algosaibi	1
(Bahrain) Lechner Racing Middle East	Porsche 991 GT3 Cup	7	(Austria) Klaus Bachler	1
(Bahrain) Lechner Racing Middle East	Porsche 991 GT3 Cup	7	(Netherlands) Jaap van Lagen	1
(Bahrain) Lechner Racing Middle East	Porsche 991 GT3 Cup	7	(Austria) Clemens Schmid	1
(France) Ruffier Racing	Porsche 997 GT3 Cup	17	(France) Gabriel Abergel	1–2, 4–5
(France) Ruffier Racing	Porsche 997 GT3 Cup	17	(France) Patrice Lafargue	1–2, 4–5
(France) Ruffier Racing	Porsche 997 GT3 Cup	17	(France) Paul Lafargue	1–2, 4–5
(France) Ruffier Racing	Porsche 997 GT3 Cup	17	(France) Dimitri Enjalbert	4–5
(Germany) MRS GT-Racing	Porsche 991 GT3 Cup	20	(France) Olivier Baharian	1
(Germany) MRS GT-Racing	Porsche 991 GT3 Cup	20	(France) Thierry Blaise	1
(Germany) MRS GT-Racing	Porsche 991 GT3 Cup	20	(Germany) Elia Erhart	1
(Germany) MRS GT-Racing	Porsche 991 GT3 Cup	20	(Taiwan) Johnson Huang	1
(Germany) MRS GT-Racing	Porsche 991 GT3 Cup	20	(Switzerland) Manuel Nicolaidis	1
(Germany) MRS GT-Racing	Porsche 991 GT3 Cup	20	(United States) Charles Espenlaub	2–6
(Germany) MRS GT-Racing	Porsche 991 GT3 Cup	20	(United States) Charles Putman	2–6
(Germany) MRS GT-Racing	Porsche 991 GT3 Cup	20	(Germany) Christian Engelhart	2, 6
(Germany) MRS GT-Racing	Porsche 991 GT3 Cup	20	(Netherlands) Xavier Maassen	3
(Germany) MRS GT-Racing	Porsche 991 GT3 Cup	20	(United States) Joe Foster	4–5
(Germany) MRS GT-Racing	Porsche 991 GT3 Cup	20	(United States) David Russell	4–5
(Germany) MRS GT-Racing	Porsche 991 GT3 Cup	46	(Germany) Chris le Bon	1
(Germany) MRS GT-Racing	Porsche 991 GT3 Cup	46	(Germany) Elia Erhart	1
(Germany) MRS GT-Racing	Porsche 991 GT3 Cup	46	(United Arab Emirates) Bassam Konfli	1
(Germany) MRS GT-Racing	Porsche 991 GT3 Cup	46	(Russia) Ilya Melnikov	1
(Germany) MRS GT-Racing	Porsche 991 GT3 Cup	46	(Germany) Siegfried Venema	1
(Germany) Black Falcon	Porsche 991 GT3 Cup	25	(Germany) Burkard Kaiser	1
(Germany) Black Falcon	Porsche 991 GT3 Cup	25	(Germany) Manuel Metzger	1
(Germany) Black Falcon	Porsche 991 GT3 Cup	25	(Switzerland) Christian Raubach	1
(Germany) Black Falcon	Porsche 991 GT3 Cup	25	(Netherlands) Gerwin Schuring	1
(Germany) Black Falcon	Porsche 991 GT3 Cup	26	(Saudi Arabia) Saud Al Faisal	1
(Germany) Black Falcon	Porsche 991 GT3 Cup	26	(Denmark) Anders Fjordbach	1
(Germany) Black Falcon	Porsche 991 GT3 Cup	26	(Japan) Keita Sawa	1
(Germany) Black Falcon	Porsche 991 GT3 Cup	26	(Germany) Andreas Weishaupt	1
(Germany) Artthea Sport	Porsche 997 GT3 Cup	45	(Germany) Jens Feucht	2–3, 5
(Germany) Artthea Sport	Porsche 997 GT3 Cup	45	(Germany) Klaus Werner	2–3, 5
(Germany) Artthea Sport	Porsche 997 GT3 Cup	45	(Slovakia) Miro Konôpka	2–3
(Germany) Artthea Sport	Porsche 997 GT3 Cup	45	(Germany) Michael Krings	3
(Germany) Artthea Sport	Porsche 997 GT3 Cup	45	(Denmark) Nanna Hald Gøtsche	5
(Germany) Artthea Sport	Porsche 997 GT3 Cup	45	(Germany) Jochen Hudelmaier	5
(Poland) Förch Racing by Lukas Motorsport	Porsche 991 GT3 Cup	45	(Germany) Patrick Eisemann	1
(Poland) Förch Racing by Lukas Motorsport	Porsche 991 GT3 Cup	45	(Germany) Steve Feige	1
(Poland) Förch Racing by Lukas Motorsport	Porsche 991 GT3 Cup	45	(Slovakia) Miro Konôpka	1
(Poland) Förch Racing by Lukas Motorsport	Porsche 991 GT3 Cup	45	(Poland) Robert Lukas	1
(Poland) Förch Racing by Lukas Motorsport	Porsche 991 GT3 Cup	45	(Poland) Grzegorz Moczulski	1
(France) B2F Compétition	Porsche 997 GT3 Cup	47	(France) Benoît Fretin	1–3, 5–6
(France) B2F Compétition	Porsche 997 GT3 Cup	47	(France) Michel Mitieus	1–3, 5–6
(France) B2F Compétition	Porsche 997 GT3 Cup	47	(France) Bruno Fretin	1–3, 5
(France) B2F Compétition	Porsche 997 GT3 Cup	47	(France) Gilles Petit	1
(France) B2F Compétition	Porsche 997 GT3 Cup	47	(France) Pascal Colon	5–6
(France) Le Duigou Racing	Porsche 997 GT3 Cup	49	(France) Jacques-André Dupuy	1
(France) Le Duigou Racing	Porsche 997 GT3 Cup	49	(Belgium) Jean-Lou Rihon	1
(France) Le Duigou Racing	Porsche 997 GT3 Cup	49	(France) Rémi Terrail	1
(France) Le Duigou Racing	Porsche 997 GT3 Cup	49	(Italy) Massimo Vignali	1
(France) Le Duigou Racing	Porsche 997 GT3 Cup	49	(Switzerland) Tiziano Carugati	4
(France) Le Duigou Racing	Porsche 997 GT3 Cup	49	(France) Franck Metzger	4
(France) Le Duigou Racing	Porsche 997 GT3 Cup	49	(Portugal) Carlos Sarrea	4
(France) Le Duigou Racing	Porsche 997 GT3 Cup	49	(France) Bruno Tortora	4
GT3 Poland	Porsche 991 GT3 Cup	50	(Poland) Marcin Jedliński	2
GT3 Poland	Porsche 991 GT3 Cup	50	(Poland) Stanisław Jedliński	2
GT3 Poland	Porsche 991 GT3 Cup	50	(Poland) Robert Lukas	2
GT3 Poland	Porsche 991 GT3 Cup	50	(Poland) Bartosz Opioła	2
(Austria) MSG Motorsport	Porsche 997 GT3 Cup	51	(Austria) Martin Gasser	2
(Austria) MSG Motorsport	Porsche 997 GT3 Cup	51	(Italy) Sergio Negroni	2
(Austria) MSG Motorsport	Porsche 997 GT3 Cup	51	(Denmark) René Ogrocki	2
(Austria) MSG Motorsport	Porsche 991 GT3 Cup	51	(Austria) Luca Rettenbacher	4, 6
(Austria) MSG Motorsport	Porsche 991 GT3 Cup	51	(Australia) Stephen Borness	4
(Austria) MSG Motorsport	Porsche 991 GT3 Cup	51	(Germany) Fabian Engel	4
(Austria) MSG Motorsport	Porsche 991 GT3 Cup	51	(Argentina) José Luis Talermann	4
(Austria) MSG Motorsport	Porsche 991 GT3 Cup	51	(United Kingdom) Adrian Watt	4
(Austria) MSG Motorsport	Porsche 991 GT3 Cup	51	(Austria) Klaus Bachler	6
(Austria) MSG Motorsport	Porsche 991 GT3 Cup	51	(Austria) Felix Wimmer	6
(Austria) MSG Motorsport	Porsche 991 GT3 Cup	52	(Austria) Luca Rettenbacher	2–4
(Austria) MSG Motorsport	Porsche 991 GT3 Cup	52	(Austria) Felix Wimmer	2–4
(Austria) MSG Motorsport	Porsche 991 GT3 Cup	52	(Austria) Martin Konrad	2–3
(Austria) MSG Motorsport	Porsche 991 GT3 Cup	52	(Germany) Kim André Hauschild	3–4
(Austria) MSG Motorsport	Porsche 991 GT3 Cup	52	(Denmark) Anders Fjordbach	4
(Austria) MSG Motorsport	Porsche 991 GT3 Cup	52	(Argentina) Facu Regalia	4
(Italy) Dinamic Motorsport	Porsche 991 GT3 Cup	53	(Italy) Tiziano Cappelletti	1–2
(Italy) Dinamic Motorsport	Porsche 991 GT3 Cup	53	(Italy) Mario Cordoni	1
(Italy) Dinamic Motorsport	Porsche 991 GT3 Cup	53	(Italy) Piero Foglio	1
(Italy) Dinamic Motorsport	Porsche 991 GT3 Cup	53	(Italy) Tiziano Frazza	1
(Italy) Dinamic Motorsport	Porsche 991 GT3 Cup	53	(Italy) Roberto Rayneri	1
(Italy) Dinamic Motorsport	Porsche 991 GT3 Cup	53	(Italy) Alex de Giacomi	2
(Italy) Dinamic Motorsport	Porsche 991 GT3 Cup	53	(Italy) Francesca Linossi	2
(Italy) Dinamic Motorsport	Porsche 991 GT3 Cup	53	(Italy) Niccolò Mercatali	2
(Spain) Drivex	Porsche 991 GT3 Cup	54	(Brazil) Carlos Ambrósio	5
(Spain) Drivex	Porsche 991 GT3 Cup	54	(Brazil) Eduardo Azevedo	5
(Spain) Drivex	Porsche 991 GT3 Cup	54	(Brazil) Gilberto Farah	5
(Spain) Drivex	Porsche 991 GT3 Cup	54	(Brazil) Ricardo Maurício	5
(Spain) Drivex	Porsche 991 GT3 Cup	54	(Brazil) Daniel Schneider	5
(France) Crubilé Sport	Porsche 991 GT3 Cup	55	(France) Emmanuel Collard	4
(France) Crubilé Sport	Porsche 991 GT3 Cup	55	(France) Sébastien Crubilé	4
(France) Crubilé Sport	Porsche 991 GT3 Cup	55	(France) Cédric Mezard	4
(France) Crubilé Sport	Porsche 991 GT3 Cup	55	(France) François Perrodo	4
(Switzerland) Classica Motors by RMS	Porsche 991 GT3 Cup	56	(Switzerland) Richard Feller	2, 5
(Switzerland) Classica Motors by RMS	Porsche 991 GT3 Cup	56	(Switzerland) Manuel Nicolaidis	2, 5
(Switzerland) Classica Motors by RMS	Porsche 991 GT3 Cup	56	(Switzerland) Franco Piergiovanni	2, 5
(Switzerland) Classica Motors by RMS	Porsche 991 GT3 Cup	56	(Switzerland) Fabio Spirgi	5
(Switzerland) Classica Motors by RMS	Porsche 991 GT3 Cup	59	(Monaco) Marc Faggionato	5
(Switzerland) Classica Motors by RMS	Porsche 991 GT3 Cup	59	(Switzerland) Richard Feller	5
(Switzerland) Classica Motors by RMS	Porsche 991 GT3 Cup	59	(Switzerland) Manuel Nicolaidis	5
(Switzerland) Classica Motors by RMS	Porsche 991 GT3 Cup	59	(Monaco) Fabrice Notari	5
(Switzerland) Classica Motors by RMS	Porsche 991 GT3 Cup	59	(Switzerland) Philipp Schnyder	5
(Germany) HRT Performance (Note: Car No. 58 entered with a Porsche 991 GT3 Cup at the 12H Mugello (Rnd 2).)	Porsche 997 GT3 Cup	58	(Germany) Kim André Hauschild	1–2
(Germany) HRT Performance	Porsche 997 GT3 Cup	58	(Germany) Andreas Marc Riedl	1–2
(Germany) HRT Performance	Porsche 997 GT3 Cup	58	(Mexico) Oscar Arroyo	1
(Germany) HRT Performance	Porsche 997 GT3 Cup	58	(Mexico) Santiago Creel	1
(Germany) HRT Performance	Porsche 997 GT3 Cup	58	(Germany) Oliver Freymuth	2
(Germany) HRT Performance	Porsche 997 GT3 Cup	58	(Germany) Harald Hennes	2
(Germany) HRT Performance	Porsche 997 GT3 Cup	59	(France) Olivier Baron	1
(Germany) HRT Performance	Porsche 997 GT3 Cup	59	(Netherlands) Indy Dontje	1
(Germany) HRT Performance	Porsche 997 GT3 Cup	59	(Germany) Harald Hennes	1
(Germany) HRT Performance	Porsche 997 GT3 Cup	59	(Denmark) Kim Holmgaard	1
(Germany) HRT Performance	Porsche 997 GT3 Cup	59	(Denmark) Kasper Jensen	1
(Belgium) Speedlover	Porsche 991 GT3 Cup	60	(Belgium) Pierre-Yves Paque	All
(Belgium) Speedlover	Porsche 991 GT3 Cup	60	(France) Philippe Richard	All
(Belgium) Speedlover	Porsche 991 GT3 Cup	60	(Belgium) Vincent Despriet	1–5
(Belgium) Speedlover	Porsche 991 GT3 Cup	60	(Belgium) Yves Noël	1
(Belgium) Speedlover	Porsche 991 GT3 Cup	60	(Luxembourg) Carlos Rivas	4
(Belgium) Speedlover	Porsche 991 GT3 Cup	60	(Belgium) Wim Meulders	5
(Belgium) Speedlover	Porsche 991 GT3 Cup	60	(Luxembourg) Charel Arendt	6
(Belgium) Speedlover	Porsche 991 GT3 Cup	61	(Belgium) Philippe de Craene	1
(Belgium) Speedlover	Porsche 991 GT3 Cup	61	(Belgium) Patrick van Glabeke	1
(Belgium) Speedlover	Porsche 991 GT3 Cup	61	(Luxembourg) Serge Loudvig	1
(Belgium) Speedlover	Porsche 991 GT3 Cup	61	(Belgium) John de Wilde	1
(France) Porsche Lorient Racing	Porsche 997 GT3 Cup S	62	(France) Alain Demorge	2–4, 6
(France) Porsche Lorient Racing	Porsche 997 GT3 Cup S	62	(France) Jean-François Demorge	2–4, 6
(France) Porsche Lorient Racing	Porsche 997 GT3 Cup S	62	(France) Benjamin Roy	2–4, 6
(France) Porsche Lorient Racing	Porsche 997 GT3 Cup S	62	(France) Maxime Pialat	2–4
(France) Porsche Lorient Racing	Porsche 997 GT3 Cup S	63	(France) Gilles Blasco	2–4, 6
(France) Porsche Lorient Racing	Porsche 997 GT3 Cup S	63	(France) Frédéric Lelièvre	2–4, 6
(France) Porsche Lorient Racing	Porsche 997 GT3 Cup S	63	(France) Philippe Polette	2–4, 6
(France) Porsche Lorient Racing	Porsche 997 GT3 Cup S	63	(France) Jean-Michel Neyrial	2
(France) Porsche Lorient Racing	Porsche 997 GT3 Cup S	63	(France) Frédéric Ancel	3–4, 6
(France) Porsche Lorient Racing	Porsche 997 GT3 Cup S	63	(France) Eric Mouez	4
(United Kingdom) STP Racing	Porsche 991 GT3 Cup	62	(United Kingdom) David Gathercole	1
(United Kingdom) STP Racing	Porsche 991 GT3 Cup	62	(United Kingdom) Jake Giddings	1
(United Kingdom) STP Racing	Porsche 991 GT3 Cup	62	(Australia) Simon Hodge	1
(United Kingdom) STP Racing	Porsche 991 GT3 Cup	62	(United Kingdom) Daniel Welch	1
(San Marino) GDL Racing (Note: Car No. 87 entered with a Porsche 991 GT3 Cup at the 12H Mugello (Rnd 2).)	Porsche 991 GT3 Cup	77	(Italy) Massimo Vignali	2, 4
(San Marino) GDL Racing	Porsche 991 GT3 Cup	77	(Italy) Roberto Fecchio	2
(San Marino) GDL Racing	Porsche 991 GT3 Cup	77	(Ukraine) Oleksandr Gaidai	2
(San Marino) GDL Racing	Porsche 991 GT3 Cup	77	(Australia) John Iossifidis	4
(San Marino) GDL Racing	Porsche 991 GT3 Cup	77	(Singapore) Wee Lim Keong	4
(San Marino) GDL Racing	Porsche 991 GT3 Cup	77	(France) Rémi Terrail	4
(San Marino) GDL Racing	Porsche 997 GT3 Cup	87	(Hong Kong) Nigel Farmer	1–2
(San Marino) GDL Racing	Porsche 997 GT3 Cup	87	(United Arab Emirates) Bashar Mardini	1–2
(San Marino) GDL Racing	Porsche 997 GT3 Cup	87	(Singapore) Liam Lim Keong	1
(San Marino) GDL Racing	Porsche 997 GT3 Cup	87	(Italy) Gianluca de Lorenzi	1
(San Marino) GDL Racing	Porsche 997 GT3 Cup	87	(Australia) Paul Stubber	1
(San Marino) GDL Racing	Porsche 991 GT3 Cup	97	(Australia) John Iossifidis	1
(San Marino) GDL Racing	Porsche 991 GT3 Cup	97	(Singapore) Wee Lim Keong	1
(San Marino) GDL Racing	Porsche 991 GT3 Cup	97	(Malaysia) Melvin Moh	1
(San Marino) GDL Racing	Porsche 991 GT3 Cup	97	(Russia) Mikhail Spiridonov	1
(San Marino) GDL Racing	Porsche 997 GT3 Cup S	97	(Australia) Malcolm Niall	2
(San Marino) GDL Racing	Porsche 997 GT3 Cup S	97	(Australia) Mark Pilatti	2
(Japan) Team 930 Rush	Porsche 997 GT3 Cup	930	(Japan) Yutaka Matsushima	1
(Japan) Team 930 Rush	Porsche 997 GT3 Cup	930	(Japan) Takeomi Mima	1
(Japan) Team 930 Rush	Porsche 997 GT3 Cup	930	(Japan) Yosuke Shimojima	1
(Japan) Team 930 Rush	Porsche 997 GT3 Cup	930	(Japan) Tomoyuki Takizawa	1
SP2
(Switzerland) Sportec Motorsport	Lamborghini Huracán Super Trofeo	13	(Switzerland) Fredy Barth	5
(Switzerland) Sportec Motorsport	Lamborghini Huracán Super Trofeo	13	(Switzerland) Oliver Ditzler	5
(Switzerland) Sportec Motorsport	Lamborghini Huracán Super Trofeo	13	(Germany) Jürgen Krebs	5
(Switzerland) Sportec Motorsport	Lamborghini Huracán Super Trofeo	13	(Russia) Rinat Salikhov	5
(Switzerland) Sportec Motorsport	Lamborghini Huracán Super Trofeo	21	(Switzerland) Christoph Lenz	5
(Switzerland) Sportec Motorsport	Lamborghini Huracán Super Trofeo	21	(Italy) Roberto Pampanini	5
(Switzerland) Sportec Motorsport	Lamborghini Huracán Super Trofeo	21	(Serbia) Miloš Pavlović	5
(Switzerland) Sportec Motorsport	Lamborghini Huracán Super Trofeo	21	(Switzerland) Nicolas Stürzinger	5
(Germany) Leipert Motorsport	Lamborghini Huracán Super Trofeo	22	(France) Lionel Amrouche	4
(Germany) Leipert Motorsport	Lamborghini Huracán Super Trofeo	22	(France) Jérôme de La Chapelle	4
(Germany) Leipert Motorsport	Lamborghini Huracán Super Trofeo	22	(France) Franck Leone-Provost	4
(Germany) Leipert Motorsport	Lamborghini Huracán Super Trofeo	22	(Canada) Jean-Charles Perrin	4
(Germany) Leipert Motorsport	Lamborghini Huracán Super Trofeo	22	(Russia) Vadim Gitlin	5–6
(Germany) Leipert Motorsport	Lamborghini Huracán Super Trofeo	22	(Spain) Isaac Tutumlu	5–6
(Germany) Leipert Motorsport	Lamborghini Huracán Super Trofeo	22	(Finland) Mikko Eskelinen	5
(Germany) Leipert Motorsport	Lamborghini Huracán Super Trofeo	22	(Germany) Marcel Leipert	5
(Germany) Leipert Motorsport	Lamborghini Huracán Super Trofeo	22	(Norway) Ulrik Roland Pedersen	5
(Germany) Leipert Motorsport	Lamborghini Huracán Super Trofeo	22	(United Kingdom) Adrian Watt	6
(Spain) Ayrton Intermotor	Dodge Viper Competition Coupé	32	(Spain) Toni Castillo	5
(Spain) Ayrton Intermotor	Dodge Viper Competition Coupé	32	(Belgium) Jean-Michel Gerome	5
(Spain) Ayrton Intermotor	Dodge Viper Competition Coupé	32	(Spain) José Manuel de los Milagros	5
(Spain) Ayrton Intermotor	Dodge Viper Competition Coupé	32	(Portugal) José Monroy	5
(Spain) Ayrton Intermotor	Dodge Viper Competition Coupé	32	(Spain) Jesús Diez Villaroel	5
(Czech Republic) RPD Racing	Ferrari 458 Challenge	44	(Italy) Matteo Cressoni	6
(Czech Republic) RPD Racing	Ferrari 458 Challenge	44	(Slovakia) Jozef Jakubik	6
(Czech Republic) RPD Racing	Ferrari 458 Challenge	44	(Slovakia) Lubomír Jakubik	6
(Czech Republic) RPD Racing	Ferrari 458 Challenge	44	(Czech Republic) Dušan Palcr	6
(Germany) Car Collection Motorsport	Porsche 997 GT3 Cup	46	(Germany) Gustav Edelhoff	2
(Germany) Car Collection Motorsport	Porsche 997 GT3 Cup	46	(Germany) Wolfgang Kemper	2
(Germany) Car Collection Motorsport	Porsche 997 GT3 Cup	46	(Germany) Johannes Kirchhoff	2
(Germany) Car Collection Motorsport	Porsche 997 GT3 Cup	46	(Germany) Ingo Vogler	2
(Slovakia) ARC Bratislava	Porsche 997 GT3 Cup S	66	(Slovakia) Matej Konopka	4–5
(Slovakia) ARC Bratislava	Porsche 997 GT3 Cup S	66	(Slovakia) Miro Konôpka	4–5
(Slovakia) ARC Bratislava	Porsche 997 GT3 Cup S	66	(Slovakia) Zdeno Mikuláško	4–5
(Slovakia) ARC Bratislava	Porsche 997 GT3 Cup S	66	(Slovakia) Miro Horňák	5
MARC Cars Australia (Note: Car No. 92 entered with a MARC Mazda 3 V8 at the 12H Zandvoort (Rnd 3) and car No. 93 entered with a MARC Focus V8 at the 24H Dubai (Rnd 1).)	MARC Focus V8	91	(Papua New Guinea) Keith Kassulke	1–2, 4–6
MARC Cars Australia	MARC Focus V8	91	(Australia) Peter Leemhuis	1–2, 6
MARC Cars Australia	MARC Focus V8	91	(Australia) Tony Alford	1
MARC Cars Australia	MARC Focus V8	91	(Australia) Tarek Elgammal	1
MARC Cars Australia	MARC Focus V8	91	(Australia) Duvashen Padayachee	1
MARC Cars Australia	MARC Focus V8	91	(Australia) Ryan McLeod	2, 4–5
MARC Cars Australia	MARC Focus V8	91	(Australia) Jake Camilleri	2, 6
MARC Cars Australia	MARC Focus V8	91	(Australia) Ben Gersekowski	3–5
MARC Cars Australia	MARC Focus V8	91	(United Kingdom) James Kaye	3, 5
MARC Cars Australia	MARC Focus V8	91	(Qatar) Amro Al-Hamad	3
MARC Cars Australia	MARC Focus V8	91	(Australia) Gary Jacobson	3
MARC Cars Australia	MARC Focus V8	92	(United Kingdom) James Kaye	1–2, 4, 6
MARC Cars Australia	MARC Focus V8	92	(Australia) Ryan McLeod	1, 5
MARC Cars Australia	MARC Focus V8	92	(Australia) Dean Fiore	1
MARC Cars Australia	MARC Focus V8	92	(Qatar) Amro Al-Hamad	1
MARC Cars Australia	MARC Focus V8	92	(Australia) Tony Karanfilovski	1
MARC Cars Australia	MARC Focus V8	92	(Spain) Manuel Cintrano	2
MARC Cars Australia	MARC Focus V8	92	(Australia) Ben Gersekowski	2
MARC Cars Australia	MARC Focus V8	92	(Spain) Javier Morcillo	2
MARC Cars Australia	MARC Focus V8	92	(Australia) Peter Leemhuis	3–5
MARC Cars Australia	MARC Focus V8	92	(Australia) Jake Camilleri	3
MARC Cars Australia	MARC Focus V8	92	(Papua New Guinea) Keith Kassulke	3
MARC Cars Australia	MARC Focus V8	92	(Australia) Hadrian Morrall	4
MARC Cars Australia	MARC Focus V8	92	(United Kingdom) Jeff Smith	4
MARC Cars Australia	MARC Focus V8	92	(United Kingdom) Jade Edwards	5
MARC Cars Australia	MARC Focus V8	92	(Australia) Morgan Haber	5
MARC Cars Australia	MARC Focus V8	92	(United States) Hal Prewitt	5
MARC Cars Australia	MARC Focus V8	92	(Australia) Brett Niall	6
MARC Cars Australia	MARC Focus V8	92	(Australia) Malcolm Niall	6
MARC Cars Australia	MARC Mazda 3 V8	93	(Australia) Jake Camilleri	1, 4–5
MARC Cars Australia	MARC Mazda 3 V8	93	(Australia) Malcolm Niall	1, 4
MARC Cars Australia	MARC Mazda 3 V8	93	(Australia) Lindsay Kearns	1
MARC Cars Australia	MARC Mazda 3 V8	93	(Australia) Scott Nicholas	1
MARC Cars Australia	MARC Mazda 3 V8	93	(Australia) Clint Harvey	4
MARC Cars Australia	MARC Mazda 3 V8	93	(Australia) Brett Niall	4
MARC Cars Australia	MARC Mazda 3 V8	93	(Australia) Gary Jacobson	5
MARC Cars Australia	MARC Mazda 3 V8	93	(Australia) Peter Leemhuis	5
MARC Cars Australia	MARC Mazda 3 V8	93	(Australia) Beric Lynton	5
MARC Cars Australia	MARC Mazda 3 V8	93	(Australia) Duvashen Padayachee	5
(Germany) LMS Engineering	Audi TT RS	96	(Germany) Ulrich Andree	2
(Germany) LMS Engineering	Audi TT RS	96	(Liechtenstein) Patrik Kaiser	2
(Germany) LMS Engineering	Audi TT RS	96	(United States) Chris Tiger	2
(Belgium) Boutsen Ginion Racing (Note: Entered with car No. 125 instead of No. 152 at the 24H Paul Ricard (Rnd 4).)	Maserati GranTurismo	152	(Belgium) Christophe de Fierlant	1, 4
(Belgium) Boutsen Ginion Racing	Maserati GranTurismo	152	(France) Philippe Ulivieri	1, 4
(Belgium) Boutsen Ginion Racing	Maserati GranTurismo	152	(France) Daniel Waszczinski	1, 4
(Belgium) Boutsen Ginion Racing	Maserati GranTurismo	152	(Belgium) Renaud Kuppens	1
(Belgium) Boutsen Ginion Racing	Maserati GranTurismo	152	(France) Eric Vaissière	1
(Belgium) Boutsen Ginion Racing	Maserati GranTurismo	152	(France) Marlène Broggi	4
(Germany) RWT Racing Team	Corvette Z06.R GT3	149	(Germany) Patrick Assenheimer	5
(Germany) RWT Racing Team	Corvette Z06.R GT3	149	(Germany) Sven Barth	5
(Germany) RWT Racing Team	Corvette Z06.R GT3	149	(Germany) Gerd Beisel	5
(Germany) RWT Racing Team	Corvette Z06.R GT3	149	(Germany) Joachim Kiesch	5
(Germany) RWT Racing Team	Corvette Z06.R GT3	149	(Luxembourg) "Maximilian Stein"	5
(France) GC Automobile	GC Automobile GC10-V8	150	(France) Lionel Amrouche	1–3, 5–6
(France) GC Automobile	GC Automobile GC10-V8	150	(France) Mathieu Pontais	1, 4
(France) GC Automobile	GC Automobile GC10-V8	150	(France) Alban Varutti	1, 4
(France) GC Automobile	GC Automobile GC10-V8	150	(Switzerland) Kurt Thiel	1
(France) GC Automobile	GC Automobile GC10-V8	150	(France) Franck Leone-Provost	2, 5
(France) GC Automobile	GC Automobile GC10-V8	150	(Italy) Manuele Gatto	2
(France) GC Automobile	GC Automobile GC10-V8	150	(France) Jérémy Reymond	3, 5
(France) GC Automobile	GC Automobile GC10-V8	150	(Belgium) Yvan Muller	3
(France) GC Automobile	GC Automobile GC10-V8	150	(France) Stephane Pasquet	4
(France) GC Automobile	GC Automobile GC10-V8	150	(France) Tom Soubiron	4
(France) GC Automobile	GC Automobile GC10-V8	150	(Canada) Jean-Charles Perrin	5
(France) GC Automobile	GC Automobile GC10-V8	150	(Switzerland) Eric Gaillard	6
(France) GC Automobile	GC Automobile GC10-V8	150	(France) Arnaud Gomez	6
(France) GC Automobile	GC Automobile GC10-V8	164	(France) Lionel Amrouche	5
(France) GC Automobile	GC Automobile GC10-V8	164	(France) Cyril Calmon	5
(France) GC Automobile	GC Automobile GC10-V8	164	(Switzerland) Eric Gaillard	5
(France) GC Automobile	GC Automobile GC10-V8	164	(France) Alban Varutti	5
(Netherlands) Red Camel-Jordans.nl (Note: Entered with an Audi R8 at the 24H Dubai (Rnd 1) and the 12H Mugello (Rnd 2).)	MARC Mazda 3 V8	159	(Netherlands) Ivo Breukers	1–2, 4, 6
(Netherlands) Red Camel-Jordans.nl	MARC Mazda 3 V8	159	(Netherlands) Rik Breukers	1, 4, 6
(Netherlands) Red Camel-Jordans.nl	MARC Mazda 3 V8	159	(Australia) Tarek Elgammal	1
(Netherlands) Red Camel-Jordans.nl	MARC Mazda 3 V8	159	(Sweden) Tommy Lindroth	1
(Netherlands) Red Camel-Jordans.nl	MARC Mazda 3 V8	159	(United Kingdom) Robert Nearn	2, 4
(Netherlands) Red Camel-Jordans.nl	MARC Mazda 3 V8	159	(Netherlands) Henk Thijssen	2
(Netherlands) Red Camel-Jordans.nl	MARC Mazda 3 V8	159	(Hong Kong) Nigel Farmer	4
(France) Team Alten	GC Automobile GC10-V8	164	(Switzerland) Eric Gaillard	4
(France) Team Alten	GC Automobile GC10-V8	164	(France) Olivier Gomez	4
(France) Team Alten	GC Automobile GC10-V8	164	(Senegal) Nagy Kabaz	4
(France) Team Alten	GC Automobile GC10-V8	164	(France) Jérémy Reymond	4
SP3
(United Kingdom) APO Sport	Porsche 997 Cup GT4	43	(United Kingdom) James May	3, 5
(United Kingdom) APO Sport	Porsche 997 Cup GT4	43	(United Kingdom) Paul May	3, 5
(United Kingdom) APO Sport	Porsche 997 Cup GT4	43	(United Kingdom) Alex Osborne	3, 5
(Sweden) Primus Racing	Ginetta G50 GT4	51	(Denmark) Peter Larsen	1
(Sweden) Primus Racing	Ginetta G50 GT4	51	(Sweden) Tommy Lindroth	1
(Sweden) Primus Racing	Ginetta G50 GT4	51	(Sweden) Thomas Martinsson	1
(Sweden) Primus Racing	Ginetta G50 GT4	51	(Sweden) Johan Rosen	1
(Czech Republic) RTR Projects	KTM X-Bow GT4	80	(Czech Republic) Pavel Heinik	6
(Czech Republic) RTR Projects	KTM X-Bow GT4	80	(Czech Republic) Milan Kodídek	6
(Czech Republic) RTR Projects	KTM X-Bow GT4	80	(Czech Republic) Tomas Miniberger	6
(Czech Republic) RTR Projects	KTM X-Bow GT4	80	(Belarus) Siarhei Paulavets	6
(Netherlands) HTM Racing (Note: Entered as HTM - Red Camel Racing at the 24H Barcelona (Rnd 5).)	Saker GT TDI	89	(Netherlands) Monny Krant	5–6
(Netherlands) HTM Racing	Saker GT TDI	89	(Netherlands) Rudolf Meijer	5–6
(Netherlands) HTM Racing	Saker GT TDI	89	(Netherlands) Henk Thijssen	5–6
(Belgium) Boutsen Ginion Racing	Maserati GranTurismo	125	(France) André-Alain Corbel	5
(Belgium) Boutsen Ginion Racing	Maserati GranTurismo	125	(Belgium) Christophe de Fierlant	5
(Belgium) Boutsen Ginion Racing	Maserati GranTurismo	125	(France) Eric Vaissière	5
(Belgium) Boutsen Ginion Racing	Maserati GranTurismo	125	(France) Daniel Waszczinski	5
(Sweden) ALFAB Racing	Aston Martin Vantage GT4	160	(Sweden) Erik Behrens	1
(Sweden) ALFAB Racing	Aston Martin Vantage GT4	160	(Sweden) Daniel Ros	1
(Sweden) ALFAB Racing	Aston Martin Vantage GT4	160	(Sweden) Henric Skoog	1
(Sweden) ALFAB Racing	Aston Martin Vantage GT4	160	(Sweden) Patrik Skoog	1
(Netherlands) Cor Euser Racing	Lotus Evora GT4	160	(Netherlands) Cor Euser	2–6
(Netherlands) Cor Euser Racing	Lotus Evora GT4	160	(United States) Hal Prewitt	2–6
(Netherlands) Cor Euser Racing	Lotus Evora GT4	160	(Netherlands) Huub Delnoij	2–3, 5
(Netherlands) Cor Euser Racing	Lotus Evora GT4	160	(United Kingdom) Sam Allpass	3
(Netherlands) Cor Euser Racing	Lotus Evora GT4	160	(United States) Vic Rice	4
(Netherlands) Cor Euser Racing	Lotus Evora GT4	160	(Netherlands) Richard Verburg	4
(Netherlands) Cor Euser Racing	Lotus Evora GT4	160	(Netherlands) Danny van Dongen	6
(Germany) Securtal Sorg Rennsport	BMW M3 GT4 (E92)	161	(Germany) Oliver Bender	1–4, 6
(Germany) Securtal Sorg Rennsport	BMW M3 GT4 (E92)	161	(United Kingdom) Paul Follett	1–4, 6
(Germany) Securtal Sorg Rennsport	BMW M3 GT4 (E92)	161	(Germany) Frank Elsässer	1–4
(Germany) Securtal Sorg Rennsport	BMW M3 GT4 (E92)	161	(Germany) Stefan Beyer	1
(Germany) Securtal Sorg Rennsport	BMW M3 GT4 (E92)	161	(Germany) Ulf Wickop	3
(Germany) Securtal Sorg Rennsport	BMW M3 GT4 (E92)	161	(Germany) Torsten Kratz	4, 6
(Germany) Securtal Sorg Rennsport	BMW M3 GT4 (E92)	161	(Austria) Siegfried Kuzdas	6
(Austria) Niedertscheider Motorsport	Ginetta G50 GT4	162	(Austria) Lukas Niedertscheider	1–2, 6
(Austria) Niedertscheider Motorsport	Ginetta G50 GT4	162	(Austria) Georg Steffny	1–2, 6
(Austria) Niedertscheider Motorsport	Ginetta G50 GT4	162	(Italy) Marco Maranelli	1–2
(Austria) Niedertscheider Motorsport	Ginetta G50 GT4	162	(Austria) Martin Niedertscheider	1–2
(Austria) Niedertscheider Motorsport	Ginetta G50 GT4	162	(Austria) Michael Fischer	1
(Austria) Niedertscheider Motorsport	Ginetta G50 GT4	162	(Austria) Norbert Lenzenweger	6
(United Kingdom) Optimum Motorsport	Ginetta G55 GT4	163	(United Kingdom) Adrian Barwick	1–2, 5
(United Kingdom) Optimum Motorsport	Ginetta G55 GT4	163	(United Kingdom) Bradley Ellis	1–2, 5
(United Kingdom) Optimum Motorsport	Ginetta G55 GT4	163	(United Kingdom) Euan Alers-Hankey	1
(United Kingdom) Optimum Motorsport	Ginetta G55 GT4	163	(Turkey) Salih Yoluç	1
(United Kingdom) Optimum Motorsport	Ginetta G55 GT4	163	(United Kingdom) Flick Haigh	2, 5
(United Kingdom) Optimum Motorsport	Ginetta G55 GT4	163	(United Kingdom) Will Moore	5
(France) GC Italia	GC Automobile GC10-V6	164	(Italy) Andrea Cosaro	2
(France) GC Italia	GC Automobile GC10-V6	164	(Italy) Mauro Guastamacchia	2
(France) GC Italia	GC Automobile GC10-V6	164	(Italy) Luca Lorenzini	2
(France) GC Italia	GC Automobile GC10-V6	164	(Italy) Stefano Stefanelli	2
(United Kingdom) Vantage Racing	Aston Martin Vantage GT4	165	(United Kingdom) Christopher Kemp	2, 5
(United Kingdom) Vantage Racing	Aston Martin Vantage GT4	165	(Greece) Angelos Metaxa	2, 5
(United Kingdom) Vantage Racing	Aston Martin Vantage GT4	165	(United Kingdom) Stuart Hall	2
(United Kingdom) Vantage Racing	Aston Martin Vantage GT4	165	(United Kingdom) Tom Black	5
(United Kingdom) Vantage Racing	Aston Martin Vantage GT4	165	(United Kingdom) Daniel Brown	5
(Italy) Nova Race (Note: Car No. 200 entered with a Ginetta G50 GT4 at the 12H Mugello (Rnd 2).)	Ginetta G50 GT4	167	(Italy) Roberto Ferri	1
(Italy) Nova Race	Ginetta G50 GT4	167	(United Kingdom) Henry Fletcher	1
(Italy) Nova Race	Ginetta G50 GT4	167	(Italy) Roberto Gentili	1
(Italy) Nova Race	Ginetta G50 GT4	167	(Italy) Alberto Vescovi	1
(Italy) Nova Race	Ginetta G55 GT4	200	(Italy) Roberto Ferri	2, 4
(Italy) Nova Race	Ginetta G55 GT4	200	(Italy) Luca Magnoni	2, 4
(Italy) Nova Race	Ginetta G55 GT4	200	(Italy) Alberto Vescovi	2, 4
(Italy) Nova Race	Ginetta G55 GT4	200	(United Kingdom) Henry Fletcher	4
(Italy) Nova Race	Ginetta G50 GT4	205	(Italy) Matteo Cressoni	1
(Italy) Nova Race	Ginetta G50 GT4	205	(Italy) Fabio Ghizzi	1
(Italy) Nova Race	Ginetta G50 GT4	205	(Italy) Luca Magnoni	1
(Italy) Nova Race	Ginetta G50 GT4	205	(Italy) Luis Scarpaccio	1
(Italy) Nova Race	Ginetta G50 GT4	206	(Italy) Carlo Mantori	2, 4
(Italy) Nova Race	Ginetta G50 GT4	206	(Belgium) Jean-Pierre Lequeux	2
(Italy) Nova Race	Ginetta G50 GT4	206	(Belgium) Jerome Naveaux	2
(Italy) Nova Race	Ginetta G50 GT4	206	(Italy) Andrea Barenghi	4
(Italy) Nova Race	Ginetta G50 GT4	206	(Sweden) Fredrik Blomstedt	4
(Italy) Nova Race	Ginetta G50 GT4	206	(France) Philippe Cimadomo	4
(Italy) Nova Race	Ginetta G50 GT4	221	(France) Christophe Capelli	2
(Italy) Nova Race	Ginetta G50 GT4	221	(France) Philippe Cimadomo	2
(Italy) Nova Race	Ginetta G50 GT4	221	(United Kingdom) Henry Fletcher	2
(Netherlands) Team Bleekemolen	Porsche 996 GT3 Cup	168	(Germany) Dirk Schulz	3
(Netherlands) Team Bleekemolen	Porsche 996 GT3 Cup	168	(Germany) Jan Marc Schulz	3
(United Kingdom) Speedworks Motorsport	Ginetta G50 GT4	169	(United Kingdom) Tony Hughes	1–3, 6
(United Kingdom) Speedworks Motorsport	Ginetta G50 GT4	169	(United Kingdom) Ollie Jackson	1–3
(United Kingdom) Speedworks Motorsport	Ginetta G50 GT4	169	(United Kingdom) Ross Warburton	1–3
(United Kingdom) Speedworks Motorsport	Ginetta G50 GT4	169	(United Kingdom) Tom Oliphant	1
(United Kingdom) Speedworks Motorsport	Ginetta G50 GT4	169	(United Kingdom) Piers Johnson	6
(United Kingdom) Speedworks Motorsport	Ginetta G50 GT4	169	(United Kingdom) George Richardson	6
(United Kingdom) Speedworks Motorsport	Aston Martin Vantage GT4	170	(United Kingdom) John Gilbert	All
(United Kingdom) Speedworks Motorsport	Aston Martin Vantage GT4	170	(United Kingdom) Devon Modell	All
(United Kingdom) Speedworks Motorsport	Aston Martin Vantage GT4	170	(United Kingdom) Flick Haigh	1
(United Kingdom) Speedworks Motorsport	Aston Martin Vantage GT4	170	(United Kingdom) Paul O'Neill	1
(United Kingdom) Speedworks Motorsport	Aston Martin Vantage GT4	170	(United Kingdom) Ollie Hancock	2–3, 6
(United Kingdom) Speedworks Motorsport	Aston Martin Vantage GT4	170	(United Kingdom) Tony Hughes	4
(United Kingdom) Speedworks Motorsport	Aston Martin Vantage GT4	170	(United Kingdom) Steven Liquorish	4
(United Kingdom) Speedworks Motorsport	Aston Martin Vantage GT4	170	(United Kingdom) Dan Jones	5
(United Kingdom) Speedworks Motorsport	Aston Martin Vantage GT4	170	(United Kingdom) Ross Warburton	5
(United Kingdom) Rollcentre Racing	BMW M3 V8 (E46)	173	(United Kingdom) Harvey Death	5
(United Kingdom) Rollcentre Racing	BMW M3 V8 (E46)	173	(United Kingdom) Charles Lamb	5
(United Kingdom) Rollcentre Racing	BMW M3 V8 (E46)	173	(United Kingdom) Richard Neary	5
(United Kingdom) Rollcentre Racing	BMW M3 V8 (E46)	173	(United Kingdom) Martin Short	5
(Germany) Walkenhorst Motorsport	BMW M235i Racing (2016)	174	(Germany) Dirk Adorf	6
(Germany) Walkenhorst Motorsport	BMW M235i Racing (2016)	174	(Sweden) Victor Bouveng	6
(Germany) Walkenhorst Motorsport	BMW M235i Racing (2016)	174	(New Zealand) Nick Cassidy	6
(Germany) Walkenhorst Motorsport	BMW M235i Racing (2016)	174	(United States) Trent Hindman	6
(United Kingdom) CWS 4x4	Ginetta G55 GT4	178	(United Kingdom) Tony Hughes	5
(United Kingdom) CWS 4x4	Ginetta G55 GT4	178	(United Kingdom) Martin Thomas	5
(United Kingdom) CWS 4x4	Ginetta G55 GT4	178	(United Kingdom) Colin White	5
A5
(Austria) Duller Motorsport	BMW M3 (E46)	31	(Austria) Herwig Duller	2
(Austria) Duller Motorsport	BMW M3 (E46)	31	(Austria) Michael Fischer	2
(Austria) Duller Motorsport	BMW M3 (E46)	31	(Austria) Markus Weege	2
(Germany) Hofor-Kuepper Racing	BMW M3 Coupé (E46)	14	(Switzerland) Roland Eggimann	4
(Germany) Hofor-Kuepper Racing	BMW M3 Coupé (E46)	14	(Switzerland) Martin Kroll	4
(Germany) Hofor-Kuepper Racing	BMW M3 Coupé (E46)	14	(Switzerland) Michael Kroll	4
(Germany) Hofor-Kuepper Racing	BMW M3 Coupé (E46)	14	(Germany) Bernd Küpper	4
(Germany) Hofor-Kuepper Racing	BMW M3 Coupé (E46)	75	(Switzerland) Martin Kroll	All
(Germany) Hofor-Kuepper Racing	BMW M3 Coupé (E46)	75	(Germany) Bernd Küpper	All
(Germany) Hofor-Kuepper Racing	BMW M3 Coupé (E46)	75	(Switzerland) Chantal Kroll	1, 3–6
(Germany) Hofor-Kuepper Racing	BMW M3 Coupé (E46)	75	(United States) Hal Prewitt	1
(Germany) Hofor-Kuepper Racing	BMW M3 Coupé (E46)	75	(Switzerland) Sarah Toniutti	1
(Germany) Hofor-Kuepper Racing	BMW M3 Coupé (E46)	75	(Germany) Lars Jürgen Zander	2–3
(Germany) Hofor-Kuepper Racing	BMW M3 Coupé (E46)	75	(Belarus) Siarhei Paulavets	4–5
(Germany) Hofor-Kuepper Racing	BMW M3 Coupé (E46)	75	(France) Fabrice Reicher	4
(Germany) Hofor-Kuepper Racing	BMW M3 Coupé (E46)	75	(Switzerland) Ronny Tobler	5
(Germany) Hofor-Kuepper Racing	BMW M3 Coupé (E46)	75	(Netherlands) Michel Schaap	6
(Netherlands) JR Motorsport	BMW M3 GTR (E46)	77	(United Kingdom) Benjamin Gill	1
(Netherlands) JR Motorsport	BMW M3 GTR (E46)	77	(Netherlands) Bob Herber	1
(Netherlands) JR Motorsport	BMW M3 GTR (E46)	77	(United Kingdom) Mark Jaffray	1
(Netherlands) JR Motorsport	BMW M3 GTR (E46)	77	(Netherlands) Martin Lanting	1
(Netherlands) JR Motorsport	BMW M3 GTR (E46)	78	(Netherlands) Gijs Bessem	1
(Netherlands) JR Motorsport	BMW M3 GTR (E46)	78	(Netherlands) Roger Grouwels	1
(Netherlands) JR Motorsport	BMW M3 GTR (E46)	78	(Netherlands) Harry Hilders	1
(Netherlands) JR Motorsport	BMW M3 GTR (E46)	78	(Netherlands) Daan Meijer	1
(Czech Republic) BP Autosport - HTRT	BMW M3 GTR (E46)	78	(Czech Republic) Jan Červenka	6
(Czech Republic) BP Autosport - HTRT	BMW M3 GTR (E46)	78	(Belarus) Siarhei Paulavets	6
(Czech Republic) BP Autosport - HTRT	BMW M3 GTR (E46)	78	(Czech Republic) Martin Šípek	6
(Czech Republic) BP Autosport - HTRT	BMW M3 GTR (E46)	78	(Czech Republic) Michal Vitek	6
(Czech Republic) BP Autosport - HTRT	BMW M3 GTR (E46)	78	(Czech Republic) Vladimír Vitver	6
(United Kingdom) WEC Motorsport	BMW M3 (E46)	78	(United Kingdom) David Cox	5
(United Kingdom) WEC Motorsport	BMW M3 (E46)	78	(United Kingdom) Jason Cox	5
(United Kingdom) WEC Motorsport	BMW M3 (E46)	78	(United Kingdom) George Haynes	5
(United Kingdom) WEC Motorsport	BMW M3 (E46)	78	(Australia) Richard Shaw	5
(Luxembourg) DUWO Racing	BMW M3 (E46)	79	(France) Thierry Chkondali	1
(Luxembourg) DUWO Racing	BMW M3 (E46)	79	(Luxembourg) Jean-Marie Dumont	1
(Luxembourg) DUWO Racing	BMW M3 (E46)	79	(Luxembourg) Maurice Faber	1
(Luxembourg) DUWO Racing	BMW M3 (E46)	79	(France) Frédéric Schmit	1
(Luxembourg) DUWO Racing	BMW M3 (E46)	79	(France) Nicolas Schmit	1
(Czech Republic) RTR Projects	BMW M3 GTR (E46)	80	(Czech Republic) Milan Kodídek	1–3
(Czech Republic) RTR Projects	BMW M3 GTR (E46)	80	(Czech Republic) Tomas Miniberger	1–3
(Czech Republic) RTR Projects	BMW M3 GTR (E46)	80	(Belarus) Siarhei Paulavets	1–3
(Czech Republic) RTR Projects	BMW M3 GTR (E46)	80	(Czech Republic) Tomas Kwolek	1, 3
(Czech Republic) RTR Projects	BMW M3 GTR (E46)	80	(Czech Republic) Michal Vitek	1
(Germany) Tischner Motorsport	BMW M3 Coupé (E46)	81	(Germany) Ulrich Becker	3
(Germany) Tischner Motorsport	BMW M3 Coupé (E46)	81	(Germany) Matthias Tischner	3
(Germany) Tischner Motorsport	BMW M3 Coupé (E46)	81	(Germany) Michael Tischner	3
(Czech Republic) Duck Racing	BMW M3 GTR (E36)	82	(Czech Republic) Lumír Firla	6
(Czech Republic) Duck Racing	BMW M3 GTR (E36)	82	(Czech Republic) Daniel Skalický	6
(Czech Republic) Duck Racing	BMW M3 GTR (E36)	82	(Czech Republic) Dan Suchý	6
(Netherlands) Cor Euser Racing	BMW M3 (E46)	83	(United States) Hal Prewitt	3–4, 6
(Netherlands) Cor Euser Racing	BMW M3 (E46)	83	(United Kingdom) Simon Atkinson	3
(Netherlands) Cor Euser Racing	BMW M3 (E46)	83	(Netherlands) Huub Delnoij	3
(Netherlands) Cor Euser Racing	BMW M3 (E46)	83	(Netherlands) Cor Euser	3
(Netherlands) Cor Euser Racing	BMW M3 (E46)	83	(United States) Jim Briody	4
(Netherlands) Cor Euser Racing	BMW M3 (E46)	83	(United States) Lance Miller	4
(Netherlands) Cor Euser Racing	BMW M3 (E46)	83	(Australia) Maurice O'Reilley	4
(Netherlands) Cor Euser Racing	BMW M3 (E46)	83	(United States) Vic Rice	4
(Netherlands) Cor Euser Racing	BMW M3 (E46)	83	(Netherlands) Jacky van der Ende	6
(Netherlands) Cor Euser Racing	BMW M3 (E46)	83	(Netherlands) Ricardo van der Ende	6
(United Kingdom) Intersport Racing	BMW M3 CSL (E46)	84	(United Kingdom) Kevin Clarke	5
(United Kingdom) Intersport Racing	BMW M3 CSL (E46)	84	(United Kingdom) Adam Hayes	5
(United Kingdom) Intersport Racing	BMW M3 CSL (E46)	84	(United Kingdom) Ryan Lindsay	5
(United Kingdom) Intersport Racing	BMW M3 CSL (E46)	84	(United Kingdom) Mark Radcliffe	5
(United Kingdom) Intersport Racing	BMW M3 CSL (E46)	85	(United Kingdom) Simon Atkinson	5
(United Kingdom) Intersport Racing	BMW M3 CSL (E46)	85	(United Kingdom) Kevin Clarke	5
(United Kingdom) Intersport Racing	BMW M3 CSL (E46)	85	(United Kingdom) Fiona James	5
(United Kingdom) Intersport Racing	BMW M3 CSL (E46)	85	(United Kingdom) Ryan Lindsay	5
(France) LD Racing	BMW Z4M (E85)	86	(France) Jean-Marc Bachelier	5
(France) LD Racing	BMW Z4M (E85)	86	(France) Patrice Chapon	5
(France) LD Racing	BMW Z4M (E85)	86	(France) Adrien Havette	5
(France) LD Racing	BMW Z4M (E85)	86	(France) Guillaune Havette	5
(France) LD Racing	BMW Z4M (E85)	86	(France) Eric Vincenot	5
(Denmark) Scangrip Racing	BMW 335i Coupé (E92)	335	(Denmark) Niels Borum	3
(Denmark) Scangrip Racing	BMW 335i Coupé (E92)	335	(Germany) Alexander Krebs	3
(Denmark) Scangrip Racing	BMW 335i Coupé (E92)	335	(New Zealand) Maurice O'Reilley	3
D2
(Lithuania) RIMO	BMW 330d (E90)	145	(Lithuania) Rimantas Blažulionis	3, 6
(Lithuania) RIMO	BMW 330d (E90)	145	(Lithuania) Martynas Samuitis	3, 6
(Lithuania) RIMO	BMW 330d (E90)	145	(Lithuania) Saulius Vitkauskas	3, 6
(United Kingdom) Saxon Motorsport	BMW 135d GTR (E87)	146	(United Kingdom) Nick Barrow	4–5
(United Kingdom) Saxon Motorsport	BMW 135d GTR (E87)	146	(United Kingdom) Tom Barrow	4–5
(United Kingdom) Saxon Motorsport	BMW 135d GTR (E87)	146	(United Kingdom) Jamie Morrow	4–5
(United Kingdom) Saxon Motorsport	BMW 135d GTR (E87)	146	(United Kingdom) Sam Allpass	4
(United Kingdom) Saxon Motorsport	BMW 135d GTR (E87)	146	(United Kingdom) David Robinson	5
(Netherlands) MDM Motorsport	BMW 320d WTCC (E90)	147	(Netherlands) Jeroen den Boer	5
(Netherlands) MDM Motorsport	BMW 320d WTCC (E90)	147	(Netherlands) Mark Bus	5
(Netherlands) MDM Motorsport	BMW 320d WTCC (E90)	147	(Netherlands) Simon Knap	5
(Netherlands) MDM Motorsport	BMW 320d WTCC (E90)	147	(Netherlands) Bas van de Ven	5
A3T
(Spain) KH7 - Monlau	Seat León Cup Racer	25	(Spain) Francesc Gutiérrez Agüi	5
(Spain) KH7 - Monlau	Seat León Cup Racer	25	(Spain) Laia Sanz	5
(Czech Republic) K&K Racing Team & Válek Autosport	BMW 130i (E87)	54	(Czech Republic) Marcel Kusín	1
(Czech Republic) K&K Racing Team & Válek Autosport	BMW 130i (E87)	54	(Czech Republic) Petr Vállek	1
(Spain) RCA RACING	Seat León Cup Racer	88	(Spain) Jaime Carbó	5
(Spain) RCA RACING	Seat León Cup Racer	88	(Spain) Álvaro Fontes	5
(Spain) RCA RACING	Seat León Cup Racer	88	(Spain) César González-Bueno Mayer	5
(Spain) RCA RACING	Seat León Cup Racer	88	(Spain) Alan Sicart	5
(Spain) RCA RACING	Seat León Cup Racer	88	(Spain) Álvaro Vela	5
(Switzerland) Capricorn Racing	SEAT León Supercopa	90	(Switzerland) Patrik Meier	2, 5
(Switzerland) Capricorn Racing	SEAT León Supercopa	90	(Switzerland) Adrian Spescha	2, 5
(Switzerland) Capricorn Racing	SEAT León Supercopa	90	(Switzerland) Claudio Truffer	2, 5
(Switzerland) Capricorn Racing	SEAT León Supercopa	90	(Switzerland) Geri Haas	5
(Switzerland) Capricorn Racing	SEAT León Supercopa	90	(Switzerland) Peter Mittelholzer	5
(Germany) Car Point S Racing Schmieglitz	SEAT León Supercopa	90	(Switzerland) Cyndie Allemann	1
(Germany) Car Point S Racing Schmieglitz	SEAT León Supercopa	90	(Denmark) Heino Bo Frederiksen	1
(Germany) Car Point S Racing Schmieglitz	SEAT León Supercopa	90	(Germany) Heinz Jürgen Kroner	1
(Germany) Car Point S Racing Schmieglitz	SEAT León Supercopa	90	(Germany) Daniel Schmieglitz	1
(Germany) Car Point S Racing Schmieglitz	SEAT León Supercopa	90	(Germany) Axel Wiegner	1
AllcarTuning Racing Team Austria	SEAT León Supercopa	94	(Austria) Michael Kogler	1–2, 6
AllcarTuning Racing Team Austria	SEAT León Supercopa	94	(Austria) Peter Schöller	1–2, 6
AllcarTuning Racing Team Austria	SEAT León Supercopa	94	(Austria) "Tessitore"	1–2
(Lebanon) Memac Ogilvy Duel Racing (Note: Entered with a SEAT León Supercopa LR at the 24H Dubai (Rnd 1) and the 12H Mugello (Rnd 2).)	Seat León Cup Racer	95	(United Kingdom) Nabil Moutran	1–2, 4–6
(Lebanon) Memac Ogilvy Duel Racing	Seat León Cup Racer	95	(United Kingdom) Ramzi Moutran	1–2, 4–6
(Lebanon) Memac Ogilvy Duel Racing	Seat León Cup Racer	95	(United Kingdom) Sami Moutran	1–2, 4–6
(Lebanon) Memac Ogilvy Duel Racing	Seat León Cup Racer	95	(United Kingdom) Phil Quaife	1–2, 4–6
(Germany) MHM Motorsport	SEAT León Supercopa	96	(Germany) Henry Littig	5
(Germany) MHM Motorsport	SEAT León Supercopa	96	(Germany) Jörg Muszczak	5
(Germany) MHM Motorsport	SEAT León Supercopa	96	(Austria) Bernhard Wagner	5
(Netherlands) NKPP Racing	Seat León Cup Racer	98	(Netherlands) Harry Hilders	2, 4–6
(Netherlands) NKPP Racing	Seat León Cup Racer	98	(Netherlands) Roger Grouwels	2, 5
(Netherlands) NKPP Racing	Seat León Cup Racer	98	(Netherlands) Gijs Bessem	4–6
(Netherlands) NKPP Racing	Seat León Cup Racer	98	(Netherlands) Martin van den Berge	4
(United Kingdom) WEC Motorsport	SEAT León Supercopa	98	(United Kingdom) David Cox	1
(United Kingdom) WEC Motorsport	SEAT León Supercopa	98	(United Kingdom) Jason Cox	1
(United Kingdom) WEC Motorsport	SEAT León Supercopa	98	(United Kingdom) Michael Cox	1
(United Kingdom) WEC Motorsport	SEAT León Supercopa	98	(United Kingdom) Frank Pettitt	1
(United Kingdom) WEC Motorsport	SEAT León Supercopa	98	(United Kingdom) Gavin Spencer	1
(France) Motorsport Developpement	Seat León Cup Racer	100	(France) Gilles Courtois	4–5
(France) Motorsport Developpement	Seat León Cup Racer	100	(France) Sebastien Dussolliet	4–5
(France) Motorsport Developpement	Seat León Cup Racer	100	(France) Gérard Bonjean	4–5
(France) Motorsport Developpement	Seat León Cup Racer	100	(France) Patrick Brochier	4
(France) Motorsport Developpement	Seat León Cup Racer	100	(France) Olivier Maury	5
(France) Motorsport Developpement	Seat León Cup Racer	111	(France) Thierry Blaise	5–6
(France) Motorsport Developpement	Seat León Cup Racer	111	(France) Jean-Laurent Navarro	5–6
(France) Motorsport Developpement	Seat León Cup Racer	111	(France) Bernard Salam	5–6
(France) Motorsport Developpement	Seat León Cup Racer	111	(France) Michael Odille	5
(Spain) PCR Sport	Seat León Cup Racer	100	(Spain) Antonio Aristi	2
(Spain) PCR Sport	Seat León Cup Racer	100	(Spain) Harriet Arruabarrena	2
(Spain) PCR Sport	Seat León Cup Racer	100	(Spain) Unai Arruabarrena	2
(Spain) PCR Sport	Seat León Cup Racer	100	(Spain) Vincente Dasi	2
(Spain) PCR Sport	Seat León Cup Racer	100	(Spain) Jordi Masdeu	2
(Netherlands) Red Camel-Jordans.nl	Seat León Cup Racer	101	(Switzerland) Toni Büeler	4
(Netherlands) Red Camel-Jordans.nl	Seat León Cup Racer	101	(Netherlands) Bert de Heus	4
(Netherlands) Red Camel-Jordans.nl	Seat León Cup Racer	101	(Austria) Klaus Kresnik	4
(Netherlands) Red Camel-Jordans.nl	Seat León Cup Racer	101	(France) Michael Odille	4
(Netherlands) Red Camel-Jordans.nl	Seat León Cup Racer	101	(Netherlands) Ivo Breukers	5
(Netherlands) Red Camel-Jordans.nl	Seat León Cup Racer	101	(Netherlands) Rik Breukers	5
(Netherlands) Red Camel-Jordans.nl	Seat León Cup Racer	101	(Netherlands) Milan Dontje	5
(Netherlands) Red Camel-Jordans.nl	Seat León Cup Racer	101	(Netherlands) Sjaco Griffioen	5
(Netherlands) Red Camel-Jordans.nl	Seat León Cup Racer	101	(United Kingdom) Andreas Demetriou	6
(Netherlands) Red Camel-Jordans.nl	Seat León Cup Racer	101	(United Kingdom) Piers Masarati	6
(Netherlands) Red Camel-Jordans.nl	Seat León Cup Racer	101	(Cyprus) Chris Papageorgiou	6
(United Kingdom) Zest Racecar Engineering	SEAT León Supercopa	102	(Denmark) Martin Hald Gøtsche	2–4
(United Kingdom) Zest Racecar Engineering	SEAT León Supercopa	102	(Denmark) Nanna Hald Gøtsche	2–4
(United Kingdom) Zest Racecar Engineering	SEAT León Supercopa	102	(India) Prashanth Tharani	2, 4
(United Kingdom) Zest Racecar Engineering	SEAT León Supercopa	102	(United Kingdom) Gary Coulson	3
(United Kingdom) Zest Racecar Engineering	SEAT León Supercopa	102	(United Kingdom) Robert Taylor	4
(United Kingdom) Zest Racecar Engineering	Seat León Cup Racer	103	(United Kingdom) Gary Coulson	5
(United Kingdom) Zest Racecar Engineering	Seat León Cup Racer	103	(United Kingdom) Graham Cox	5
(United Kingdom) Zest Racecar Engineering	Seat León Cup Racer	103	(Pakistan) Umair Ahmed Khan	5
(United Kingdom) Zest Racecar Engineering	Seat León Cup Racer	103	(Republic of Ireland) Jonathan Mullan	5
(United Kingdom) Zest Racecar Engineering	Seat León Cup Racer	103	(United Kingdom) Robert Taylor	5
(Poland) R8 Motorsport	Volkswagen Golf GTI (Mk7)	104	(Poland) Adam Gładysz	1–2
(Poland) R8 Motorsport	Volkswagen Golf GTI (Mk7)	104	(Poland) Dominik Kotarba-Majkutewicz	1–2
(Poland) R8 Motorsport	Volkswagen Golf GTI (Mk7)	104	(Poland) Marcin Jaros	1
(Poland) R8 Motorsport	Volkswagen Golf GTI (Mk7)	104	(Lithuania) Robertas Kupčikas	1
(Poland) R8 Motorsport	Volkswagen Golf GTI (Mk7)	104	(Luxembourg) Dylan Pereira	1
(Poland) R8 Motorsport	Volkswagen Golf GTI (Mk7)	104	(Poland) Gosia Rdest	2
(France) R-Breizh Motorsport	SEAT León Supercopa	105	(France) Guillaume Le Boullec	4
(France) R-Breizh Motorsport	SEAT León Supercopa	105	(France) Cédric Chapron	4
(France) R-Breizh Motorsport	SEAT León Supercopa	105	(France) Cyril Pinaud	4
(France) R-Breizh Motorsport	SEAT León Supercopa	105	(France) "Ségolen"	4
(France) R-Breizh Motorsport	SEAT León Supercopa	105	(France) Antonin Tramontin	4
(France) Race Day Team	SEAT León Supercopa	106	(France) Bob Arezina	5
(France) Race Day Team	SEAT León Supercopa	106	(France) Philippe Burel	5
(France) Race Day Team	SEAT León Supercopa	106	(France) Jean-Marc Rivet	5
(France) Race Day Team	SEAT León Supercopa	106	(France) Philippe Salini	5
(United Kingdom) SICL.com BPM Racing	Seat León Cup Racer	107	(United Kingdom) Martin Byford	5
(United Kingdom) SICL.com BPM Racing	Seat León Cup Racer	107	(Netherlands) Melroy Heemskerk	5
(United Kingdom) SICL.com BPM Racing	Seat León Cup Racer	107	(Belgium) Sven van Laere	5
(United Kingdom) SICL.com BPM Racing	Seat León Cup Racer	107	(United Kingdom) Ashley Woodman	5
(United Kingdom) KPM Racing	Volkswagen Golf (Mk7)	138	(United Kingdom) Aaron Mason	5
(United Kingdom) KPM Racing	Volkswagen Golf (Mk7)	138	(United Kingdom) Dale Lomas	5
(United Kingdom) KPM Racing	Volkswagen Golf (Mk7)	138	(United Kingdom) Lucas Orrock	5
(United Kingdom) KPM Racing	Volkswagen Golf (Mk7)	138	(United Kingdom) George White	5
(United Kingdom) KPM Racing	Volkswagen Golf (Mk7)	138	(United Kingdom) Tom Wilson	5
(France) Team Altran	Peugeot 208 GTI	205	(France) François Riaux	2–5
(France) Team Altran	Peugeot 208 GTI	205	(Belgium) Sarah Bovy	2, 6
(France) Team Altran	Peugeot 208 GTI	205	(France) Gaëtan Bischoff	2
(France) Team Altran	Peugeot 208 GTI	205	(Denmark) Kim Holmgaard	3
(France) Team Altran	Peugeot 208 GTI	205	(France) Philippe Vulin	3
(France) Team Altran	Peugeot 208 GTI	205	(France) Dominique Nury	4–5
(France) Team Altran	Peugeot 208 GTI	205	(France) Marc Rostan	4
(France) Team Altran	Peugeot 208 GTI	205	(France) Eric Vaissière	4
(France) Team Altran	Peugeot 208 GTI	205	(France) Stéphane Ventaja	5, 6
(France) Team Altran	Peugeot 208 GTI	205	(France) Thierry Chkondali	5
(France) Team Altran	Peugeot 208 GTI	205	(France) Mathieu Sentis	6
(France) Team Altran	Peugeot 208 GTI	208	(France) Guillaume Roman	2–6
(France) Team Altran	Peugeot 208 GTI	208	(Spain) Gonzalo de Andrés	2, 4, 6
(France) Team Altran	Peugeot 208 GTI	208	(France) William David	2
(France) Team Altran	Peugeot 208 GTI	208	(Belgium) Vincent Radermecker	3
(France) Team Altran	Peugeot 208 GTI	208	(France) Mathieu Sentis	3
(France) Team Altran	Peugeot 208 GTI	208	(France) Gaëtan Bischoff	4
(France) Team Altran	Peugeot 208 GTI	208	(France) Steven Palette	4
(France) Team Altran	Peugeot 208 GTI	208	(Denmark) Michael Carlsen	5
(France) Team Altran	Peugeot 208 GTI	208	(Denmark) Kim Holmgaard	5
(France) Team Altran	Peugeot 208 GTI	208	(France) Marc Rostan	5
(France) Team Altran	Peugeot 208 GTI	208	(France) François Riaux	6
CUP1
(Russia) Bears4Racing	BMW M235i Racing	65	(Russia) Maxim Aronov (Note: Aronov was registered as Max Aronov at the 12H Zandvoort and the 24H Barcelona, but registered as Maxim Aronov at the 12H Epilog Brno. He therefore is named twice in the official championship standings with different first names. According to Driver Database his name is officially written as Maxim Aronov.)	6
(Russia) Bears4Racing	BMW M235i Racing	65	(Russia) Dimitrii Bogoiavlenskii	6
(Russia) Bears4Racing	BMW M235i Racing	65	(Russia) Lev Fridman	6
(Russia) Bears4Racing	BMW M235i Racing	65	(Netherlands) Dimitri van der Spek	6
(Germany) Securtal Sorg Rennsport (Note: Car No. 70 entered as MISSION POSSIBLE RACING under Austrian license.)	BMW M235i Racing	67	(Germany) Nicolas Griebner	4
(Germany) Securtal Sorg Rennsport	BMW M235i Racing	67	(Germany) Felix Günther	4
(Germany) Securtal Sorg Rennsport	BMW M235i Racing	67	(Germany) Thomas Müller	4
(Germany) Securtal Sorg Rennsport	BMW M235i Racing	67	(Germany) Daniel Sorg	4
(Germany) Securtal Sorg Rennsport	BMW M235i Racing	67	(Austria) Michael Steffny	4
(Germany) Securtal Sorg Rennsport	BMW M235i Racing	69	(Russia) Max Aronov	3
(Germany) Securtal Sorg Rennsport	BMW M235i Racing	69	(Russia) Dimitrii Bogoiavlenskii	3
(Germany) Securtal Sorg Rennsport	BMW M235i Racing	69	(Russia) Lev Fridman	3
(Germany) Securtal Sorg Rennsport	BMW M235i Racing	70	(Austria) Gustav Engljähringer	1–4
(Germany) Securtal Sorg Rennsport	BMW M235i Racing	70	(Netherlands) Mike Smit	1–2
(Germany) Securtal Sorg Rennsport	BMW M235i Racing	70	(Germany) Marc Dilger	1
(Germany) Securtal Sorg Rennsport	BMW M235i Racing	70	(Australia) Matt Speakman	1
(Germany) Securtal Sorg Rennsport	BMW M235i Racing	70	(Austria) Michael Holleweger	2
(Germany) Securtal Sorg Rennsport	BMW M235i Racing	70	(Germany) Frank Elsässer	3
(Germany) Securtal Sorg Rennsport	BMW M235i Racing	70	(Austria) Stefan Fuhrman	3
(Germany) Securtal Sorg Rennsport	BMW M235i Racing	70	(Germany) Ulf Wickop	3
(Germany) Securtal Sorg Rennsport	BMW M235i Racing	70	(Poland) Maciej Dreszer	4
(Germany) Securtal Sorg Rennsport	BMW M235i Racing	70	(Austria) Gerald Gaitzenauer	4
(Germany) Securtal Sorg Rennsport	BMW M235i Racing	70	(Austria) Martin Niedertscheider	4
(Germany) Securtal Sorg Rennsport	BMW M235i Racing	70	(Austria) Georg Steffny	4
(Germany) Securtal Sorg Rennsport	BMW M235i Racing	71	(Germany) Christian Konnerth	1
(Germany) Securtal Sorg Rennsport	BMW M235i Racing	71	(Germany) Andreas Sczepansky	1
(Germany) Securtal Sorg Rennsport	BMW M235i Racing	71	(Austria) Seppi Stigler	1
(Germany) Securtal Sorg Rennsport	BMW M235i Racing	71	(Germany) Lars Jürgen Zander	1
(Germany) Securtal Sorg Rennsport	BMW M235i Racing	71	(Poland) Maciej Dreszer	2, 5
(Germany) Securtal Sorg Rennsport	BMW M235i Racing	71	(Denmark) Anders Fjordbach	2
(Germany) Securtal Sorg Rennsport	BMW M235i Racing	71	(Germany) Kevin Warum	2
(Germany) Securtal Sorg Rennsport	BMW M235i Racing	71	(Germany) Ulf Wickop	2
(Germany) Securtal Sorg Rennsport	BMW M235i Racing	71	(United States) Zach Arnold	5
(Germany) Securtal Sorg Rennsport	BMW M235i Racing	71	(Germany) Michael Schmid	5
(Germany) Securtal Sorg Rennsport	BMW M235i Racing	71	(Iran) Meisam Taheri	5
(Germany) Securtal Sorg Rennsport	BMW M235i Racing	71	(Germany) Heiko Eichenberg	6
(Germany) Securtal Sorg Rennsport	BMW M235i Racing	71	(Germany) Felix Günther	6
(Germany) Securtal Sorg Rennsport	BMW M235i Racing	71	(Germany) Max Kottmayr	6
(Switzerland) priconracing	BMW M235i Racing	68	(Switzerland) Marco Petry	2
(Switzerland) priconracing	BMW M235i Racing	68	(Germany) Frank Unverhau	2
(Germany) Bonk Motorsport (Note: Car No. 76 entered as Racingdivas by Las Moras under Dutch license.)	BMW M235i Racing	72	(Germany) Axel Burghardt	2–3, 6
(Germany) Bonk Motorsport	BMW M235i Racing	72	(Germany) Volker Piepmeyer	2–3
(Germany) Bonk Motorsport	BMW M235i Racing	72	(Germany) Emin Akata	2
(Germany) Bonk Motorsport	BMW M235i Racing	72	(Germany) Jürgen Meyer	2
(Germany) Bonk Motorsport	BMW M235i Racing	72	(Germany) Michael Bonk	3
(Germany) Bonk Motorsport	BMW M235i Racing	72	(Poland) Maciej Dreszer	6
(Germany) Bonk Motorsport	BMW M235i Racing	72	(Germany) Michael Schrey	6
(Germany) Bonk Motorsport	BMW M235i Racing	73	(Germany) Michael Schrey	2–3
(Germany) Bonk Motorsport	BMW M235i Racing	73	(Germany) Emin Akata	2
(Germany) Bonk Motorsport	BMW M235i Racing	73	(Germany) Michael Bonk	2
(Germany) Bonk Motorsport	BMW M235i Racing	73	(Netherlands) Liesette Braams	2
(Germany) Bonk Motorsport	BMW M235i Racing	73	(Germany) Alexander Mies	3
(Germany) Bonk Motorsport	BMW M235i Racing	76	(Netherlands) Liesette Braams	1
(Germany) Bonk Motorsport	BMW M235i Racing	76	(Germany) Maximilian Partl	1
(Germany) Bonk Motorsport	BMW M235i Racing	76	(Netherlands) Sandra van der Sloot	1
(Germany) Bonk Motorsport	BMW M235i Racing	76	(Netherlands) Gaby Uljee	1
(Germany) Bonk Motorsport	BMW M235i Racing	79	(Germany) Michael Bonk	4
(Germany) Bonk Motorsport	BMW M235i Racing	79	(Germany) Axel Burghardt	4
(Germany) Bonk Motorsport	BMW M235i Racing	79	(France) Thierry Chkondali	4
(Germany) Bonk Motorsport	BMW M235i Racing	79	(Luxembourg) Jean-Marie Dumont	4
(Germany) Bonk Motorsport	BMW M235i Racing	79	(Luxembourg) Maurice Faber	4
(Germany) Race-House Motorsport	BMW M235i Racing	72	(Monaco) Jean-Jacques Bally	1
(Germany) Race-House Motorsport	BMW M235i Racing	72	(Switzerland) Tiziano Carugati	1
(Germany) Race-House Motorsport	BMW M235i Racing	72	(Germany) Dag von Garrel	1
(Germany) Race-House Motorsport	BMW M235i Racing	72	(Madagascar) Jean-Christophe Peyre	1
(Germany) Race-House Motorsport	BMW M235i Racing	72	(France) Bruno Tortora	1
(Germany) Race-House Motorsport	BMW M235i Racing	73	(United Kingdom) James Cottingham	1
(Germany) Race-House Motorsport	BMW M235i Racing	73	(Germany) Dag von Garrel	1
(Germany) Race-House Motorsport	BMW M235i Racing	73	(Switzerland) Massimiliano Girardo	1
(Germany) Race-House Motorsport	BMW M235i Racing	73	(Germany) Konstantin Jacoby	1
(Germany) Race-House Motorsport	BMW M235i Racing	73	(United States) Stephen Perry	1
(Germany) MPB Racing Team	BMW M235i Racing	74	(Finland) Matias Henkola	1
(Germany) MPB Racing Team	BMW M235i Racing	74	(Germany) Bernhard Henzel	1
(Germany) MPB Racing Team	BMW M235i Racing	74	(Germany) Stephan Kuhs	1
(Germany) MPB Racing Team	BMW M235i Racing	74	(Germany) Jörg Müller	1
(Luxembourg) DUWO Racing	BMW M235i Racing	79	(Luxembourg) Jean-Marie Dumont	3, 5
(Luxembourg) DUWO Racing	BMW M235i Racing	79	(Luxembourg) Maurice Faber	3, 5
(Luxembourg) DUWO Racing	BMW M235i Racing	79	(Poland) Maciej Dreszer	3
(Luxembourg) DUWO Racing	BMW M235i Racing	79	(United Kingdom) Adrian Watt	3
(Luxembourg) DUWO Racing	BMW M235i Racing	79	(Russia) Max Aronov	5
(Luxembourg) DUWO Racing	BMW M235i Racing	79	(Austria) Gustav Engljähringer	5
(Luxembourg) DUWO Racing	BMW M235i Racing	79	(Luxembourg) Dylan Pereira	5
A2
(France) eXigence MOTORSPORT	Renault Clio Cup (III)	36	(France) Benjamin Breton	4
(France) eXigence MOTORSPORT	Renault Clio Cup (III)	36	(France) Bernard Brussaux	4
(France) eXigence MOTORSPORT	Renault Clio Cup (III)	36	(France) Christian Douarre	4
(France) eXigence MOTORSPORT	Renault Clio Cup (III)	36	(Monaco) Nicolas Minazzoli	4
(France) eXigence MOTORSPORT	Renault Clio Cup (III)	36	(Belgium) Raphaël van der Straten	4
(United Arab Emirates) Zettanet Racing Team	Honda Integra (fourth generation)	48	(United Kingdom) Graham Davidson	1
(United Arab Emirates) Zettanet Racing Team	Honda Integra (fourth generation)	48	(Pakistan) Umair Ahmed Khan	1
(United Arab Emirates) Zettanet Racing Team	Honda Integra (fourth generation)	48	(Australia) Gerard McLeod	1
(United Arab Emirates) Zettanet Racing Team	Honda Integra (fourth generation)	48	(Republic of Ireland) Jonathan Mullan	1
(United Arab Emirates) LAP57 Racing	Honda Integra Type R	57	(Sri Lanka) Rupesh Channake	1
(United Arab Emirates) LAP57 Racing	Honda Integra Type R	57	(United Arab Emirates) Abdullah Al Hammadi	1
(United Arab Emirates) LAP57 Racing	Honda Integra Type R	57	(United Arab Emirates) Mohammed Al Owais	1
(United Arab Emirates) LAP57 Racing	Honda Integra Type R	57	(Japan) Junichi Umemoto	1
(United Arab Emirates) LAP57 Racing	Honda Integra Type R	57	(Jordan) Nadir Zuhour	1
(United Kingdom) Synchro Motorsport	Honda Civic Type R (FK2)	76	(United Kingdom) Martin Byford	4–5
(United Kingdom) Synchro Motorsport	Honda Civic Type R (FK2)	76	(United Kingdom) Simon Deaton	4–5
(United Kingdom) Synchro Motorsport	Honda Civic Type R (FK2)	76	(United Kingdom) Alyn James	4–5
(United Kingdom) Synchro Motorsport	Honda Civic Type R (FK2)	76	(United Kingdom) Daniel Wheeler	4–5
(Germany) Besaplast Racing	Mini Cooper S JCW	86	(Germany) Kai Jordan	1
(Germany) Besaplast Racing	Mini Cooper S JCW	86	(Croatia) Franjo Kovac	1
(Germany) Besaplast Racing	Mini Cooper S JCW	86	(Sweden) Fredrik Lestrup	1
(Germany) Besaplast Racing	Mini Cooper S JCW	86	(Germany) Henry Littig	1
(United Kingdom) RKC/TGM	Honda Civic Type R (FD2)	99	(United Kingdom) Chris Bentley	2–6
(United Kingdom) RKC/TGM	Honda Civic Type R (FD2)	99	(United Kingdom) Ricky Coomber	2–6
(United Kingdom) RKC/TGM	Honda Civic Type R (FD2)	99	(United Kingdom) Tom Gannon	2–6
(United Kingdom) RKC/TGM	Honda Civic Type R (FD2)	99	(United Kingdom) John Clonis	2–4
(United Kingdom) RKC/TGM	Honda Civic Type R (FD2)	99	(Denmark) Heino Bo Frederiksen	5
(United Kingdom) RKC/TGM	Honda Civic Type R (FD2)	99	(United Kingdom) William Gannon	5
(Denmark) au2parts / DK Racing Event	Renault Clio Cup (III)	108	(Denmark) Ole Klitgård	2, 5
(Denmark) au2parts / DK Racing Event	Renault Clio Cup (III)	108	(Denmark) Sonny Nielsen	2, 5
(Denmark) au2parts / DK Racing Event	Renault Clio Cup (III)	108	(Denmark) Niels Nyboe	2, 5
(Denmark) au2parts / DK Racing Event	Renault Clio Cup (III)	108	(Denmark) Tim Söderhamn	2, 5
(Denmark) au2parts / DK Racing Event	Renault Clio Cup (III)	108	(Denmark) Christian Rytter	5
(Hong Kong) Modena Motorsports	Renault Clio X-85 Cup (III)	108	(Canada) John Shen	1
(Hong Kong) Modena Motorsports	Renault Clio X-85 Cup (III)	108	(United Kingdom) Daniel Wheeler	1
(Hong Kong) Modena Motorsports	Renault Clio X-85 Cup (III)	116	(Austria) Klaus Kresnik	1
(Hong Kong) Modena Motorsports	Renault Clio X-85 Cup (III)	116	(Indonesia) Michael Soeryadjaya	1
(Hong Kong) Modena Motorsports	Renault Clio X-85 Cup (III)	216	(Canada) Christian Chia	1
(Hong Kong) Modena Motorsports	Renault Clio X-85 Cup (III)	216	(Canada) John Shen	1
(Hong Kong) Modena Motorsports	Renault Clio X-85 Cup (III)	216	(Canada) Wayne Shen	1
(Hong Kong) Modena Motorsports	Renault Clio X-85 Cup (III)	216	(Netherlands) Francis Tjia	1
(Hong Kong) Modena Motorsports	Renault Clio X-85 Cup (III)	216	(Netherlands) Marcel Tjia	1
(Hong Kong) Modena Motorsports	Renault Clio X-85 Cup (III)	217	(Canada) Christian Chia	1
(Hong Kong) Modena Motorsports	Renault Clio X-85 Cup (III)	217	(Canada) Wayne Shen	1
(Hong Kong) Modena Motorsports	Renault Clio X-85 Cup (III)	217	(Indonesia) Michael Soeryadjaya	1
(Hong Kong) Modena Motorsports	Renault Clio X-85 Cup (III)	217	(Netherlands) Francis Tjia	1
(Hong Kong) Modena Motorsports	Renault Clio X-85 Cup (III)	217	(Netherlands) Marcel Tjia	1
(United Kingdom) APO Sport	Renault Clio Cup (III)	109	(United Kingdom) James May	1
(United Kingdom) APO Sport	Renault Clio Cup (III)	109	(United Kingdom) Alex Osborne	1
(United Kingdom) APO Sport	Renault Clio Cup (III)	109	(Hungary) Gábor Tim	1
(United Kingdom) APO Sport	Renault Clio Cup (III)	109	(United Kingdom) Peter Venn	1
(France) Autosport GP	Renault Clio Cup (IV)	110	(France) Antoine Boulay	1, 4
(France) Autosport GP	Renault Clio Cup (IV)	110	(France) Jérôme Thiery	1, 4
(France) Autosport GP	Renault Clio Cup (IV)	110	(France) Franck Traynard	1, 4
(France) Autosport GP	Renault Clio Cup (IV)	110	(France) Benoît Carreras	1
(France) Autosport GP	Renault Clio Cup (IV)	110	(France) Laurent Hurgon	4
(France) Autosport GP	Renault Clio Cup (IV)	110	(France) Emmanuel Raffin	4
(France) Autosport GP	Renault Clio Cup (IV)	122	(France) Benoît Carreras	4
(France) Autosport GP	Renault Clio Cup (IV)	122	(France) Laurent Hurgon	4
(France) Autosport GP	Renault Clio Cup (IV)	122	(France) Frederic Mollon	4
(France) Autosport GP	Renault Clio Cup (IV)	122	(France) Laurent Nicoud	4
(France) Autosport GP	Renault Clio Cup (IV)	122	(France) Gilles Zaffini	4
(Czech Republic) Krenek Motorsport	Renault Clio Cup (III)	111	(Switzerland) Pascal Eberle	1
(Czech Republic) Krenek Motorsport	Renault Clio Cup (III)	111	(Switzerland) Wani Finkbohner	1
(Czech Republic) Krenek Motorsport	Renault Clio Cup (III)	111	(Switzerland) Stephan Peyer	1
(Czech Republic) Krenek Motorsport	Renault Clio Cup (III)	111	(Germany) Sebastian Steibel	1
(Czech Republic) Krenek Motorsport	Renault Clio Cup (III)	113	(Czech Republic) Martin Jerman	6
(Czech Republic) Krenek Motorsport	Renault Clio Cup (III)	113	(Czech Republic) Filip Sajler	6
(Czech Republic) Krenek Motorsport	Renault Clio Cup (III)	113	(Germany) Maik Utsch	6
(Czech Republic) Krenek Motorsport	Renault Clio Cup (III)	113	(Czech Republic) Tomáš Vavřinec	6
(Switzerland) presenza.eu Racing Team Clio	Renault Clio Cup Endurance (III)	112	(Italy) Luigi Stanco	All
(Switzerland) presenza.eu Racing Team Clio	Renault Clio Cup Endurance (III)	112	(Switzerland) Stefan Tanner	All
(Switzerland) presenza.eu Racing Team Clio	Renault Clio Cup Endurance (III)	112	(Switzerland) Stephan Jäggi	1
(Switzerland) presenza.eu Racing Team Clio	Renault Clio Cup Endurance (III)	112	(Switzerland) Marc Schelling	1
(Switzerland) presenza.eu Racing Team Clio	Renault Clio Cup Endurance (III)	112	(Italy) Adriano Stanco	2
(Switzerland) presenza.eu Racing Team Clio	Renault Clio Cup Endurance (III)	112	(Netherlands) Martijn Kool	3
(Switzerland) presenza.eu Racing Team Clio	Renault Clio Cup Endurance (III)	112	(Netherlands) Christian Dijkhof	4–5
(Switzerland) presenza.eu Racing Team Clio	Renault Clio Cup Endurance (III)	112	(Netherlands) Michel Schaap	4–5
(Switzerland) presenza.eu Racing Team Clio	Renault Clio Cup Endurance (III)	112	(Switzerland) Sarah Toniutti	4
(Switzerland) presenza.eu Racing Team Clio	Renault Clio Cup Endurance (III)	112	(Austria) Klaus Kresnik	6
(Switzerland) presenza.eu Racing Team Clio	Renault Clio Cup Endurance (III)	114	(Switzerland) Yoshiki Ohmura	1, 5
(Switzerland) presenza.eu Racing Team Clio	Renault Clio Cup Endurance (III)	114	(Germany) Thomas Loefflad	1
(Switzerland) presenza.eu Racing Team Clio	Renault Clio Cup Endurance (III)	114	(Germany) Andreas Segler	1
(Switzerland) presenza.eu Racing Team Clio	Renault Clio Cup Endurance (III)	114	(Switzerland) Thomas Stockinger	1
(Switzerland) presenza.eu Racing Team Clio	Renault Clio Cup Endurance (III)	114	(Switzerland) Fabio Botta	2
(Switzerland) presenza.eu Racing Team Clio	Renault Clio Cup Endurance (III)	114	(Switzerland) Thomas Burkart	2
(Switzerland) presenza.eu Racing Team Clio	Renault Clio Cup Endurance (III)	114	(Switzerland) Daniel Eberhard	2
(Switzerland) presenza.eu Racing Team Clio	Renault Clio Cup Endurance (III)	114	(Italy) Luigi Stanco	2
(Switzerland) presenza.eu Racing Team Clio	Renault Clio Cup Endurance (III)	114	(Switzerland) Stefan Tanner	2
(Switzerland) presenza.eu Racing Team Clio	Renault Clio Cup Endurance (III)	114	(Switzerland) Stephan Jäggi	5
(Switzerland) presenza.eu Racing Team Clio	Renault Clio Cup Endurance (III)	114	(Switzerland) Marc Schelling	5
(Switzerland) presenza.eu Racing Team Clio	Renault Clio Cup Endurance (III)	114	(Switzerland) Sarah Toniutti	5
(Denmark) Team K-Rejser (Note: Entered with a Renault Clio RS Sport (III) at the 24H Dubai (Rnd 1).)	Peugeot RCZ	115	(Denmark) Jan Engelbrecht	1–5
(Denmark) Team K-Rejser	Peugeot RCZ	115	(Denmark) Jacob Kristensen	1–5
(Denmark) Team K-Rejser	Peugeot RCZ	115	(Denmark) Per Poulsen	1–2, 5
(Denmark) Team K-Rejser	Peugeot RCZ	115	(Denmark) Thomas Sørensen	1, 3–4
(Denmark) Team K-Rejser	Peugeot RCZ	115	(Denmark) Claus Bertelsen	1, 5
(Denmark) Team K-Rejser	Peugeot RCZ	115	(Denmark) Christoffer Nygaard	4
(Germany) Nilsson Motorsport Team Scantech	Renault Clio RS (III)	116	(Germany) Rickard Nilsson	4, 6
(Germany) Nilsson Motorsport Team Scantech	Renault Clio RS (III)	116	(Germany) Tanja Nilsson	4, 6
(Belgium) VDS Racing Adventures	Honda Civic Type R (EP3)	117	(Belgium) José Close	1, 3
(Belgium) VDS Racing Adventures	Honda Civic Type R (EP3)	117	(Belgium) Grégory Paisse	1, 3
(Belgium) VDS Racing Adventures	Honda Civic Type R (EP3)	117	(Belgium) Raphaël van der Straten	1, 3
(Belgium) VDS Racing Adventures	Honda Civic Type R (EP3)	117	(Belgium) Michaël Divoy	1
(France) Milan Compétition Michel Vaillant	Peugeot RCZ	119	(France) Jean-Louis Daughter	5
(France) Milan Compétition Michel Vaillant	Peugeot RCZ	119	(France) Denis Gibaud	5
(France) Milan Compétition Michel Vaillant	Peugeot RCZ	119	(France) Jérôme Maudet	5
(France) Milan Compétition Michel Vaillant	Peugeot RCZ	119	(Portugal) Carlos Tavares	5
(Germany) frensch power motorsport	Peugeot 207 RCR	120	(Germany) Lisa Christin Brunner	1
(Germany) frensch power motorsport	Peugeot 207 RCR	120	(Germany) Friedhelm Erlebach	1
(Germany) frensch power motorsport	Peugeot 207 RCR	120	(Germany) Martin Heidrich	1
(Germany) frensch power motorsport	Peugeot 207 RCR	120	(Germany) Reinhard Nehls	1
(United Kingdom) Preptech UK	Renault Clio Cup (III)	121	(United Kingdom) Andrew Gordon-Colebrooke	5
(United Kingdom) Preptech UK	Renault Clio Cup (III)	121	(Australia) Cody Hill	5
(United Kingdom) Preptech UK	Renault Clio Cup (III)	121	(United Kingdom) Andy Mollison	5
(Denmark) HM Motorsport	Peugeot RCZ	123	(Denmark) Rene Hagedorn	2–3
(Denmark) HM Motorsport	Peugeot RCZ	123	(Denmark) Jens Erik Hansen	2–3
(Denmark) HM Motorsport	Peugeot RCZ	123	(Denmark) Jens Henrik Hansen	2–3
(Denmark) HM Motorsport	Peugeot RCZ	123	(Denmark) René Lund	3
(Germany) Pit Lane	Toyota GT86	124	(Belgium) "Brody"	1
(Germany) Pit Lane	Toyota GT86	124	(Belgium) Jacques Derenne	1
(Germany) Pit Lane	Toyota GT86	124	(Poland) Maciej Dreszer	1
(Germany) Pit Lane	Toyota GT86	124	(Belgium) Kurt Dujardyn	1
(Germany) Pit Lane	Toyota GT86	124	(Germany) Harald Rettich	1
(Denmark) Team Sally Racing	Renault Clio Cup (III)	126	(Denmark) Mads Christensen	1–5
(Denmark) Team Sally Racing	Renault Clio Cup (III)	126	(Denmark) Peter Obel	1–5
(Denmark) Team Sally Racing	Renault Clio Cup (III)	126	(Denmark) Martin Sally Pedersen	1–5
(Denmark) Team Sally Racing	Renault Clio Cup (III)	126	(Denmark) Sune Marcussen	1–2, 4
(Denmark) Team Sally Racing	Renault Clio Cup (III)	126	(Denmark) Jannik Larsen	1, 3
(Denmark) Team Sally Racing	Renault Clio Cup (III)	126	(Denmark) Kristian Jepsen	4
(Denmark) Team Sally Racing	Renault Clio Cup (III)	126	(Denmark) Frederik Nymark	5
(Denmark) Team Sally Racing	Renault Clio Cup (III)	126	(Denmark) René Rasmussen	5
(Germany) Lubner Motorsport	Renault Clio Cup (III)	127	(Luxembourg) Daniel Bohr	6
(Germany) Lubner Motorsport	Renault Clio Cup (III)	127	(Germany) Georg Braun	6
(Germany) Lubner Motorsport	Renault Clio Cup (III)	127	(Germany) Jens Löhnig	6
(Germany) Lubner Motorsport	Renault Clio Cup (III)	127	(Switzerland) Roger Voegeli	6
D1
(Netherlands) Red Camel-Jordans.nl	SEAT León TDI (Mk2)	135	(Austria) Klaus Kresnik	1–2
(Netherlands) Red Camel-Jordans.nl	SEAT León TDI (Mk2)	135	(United Kingdom) Kane Astin	1
(Netherlands) Red Camel-Jordans.nl	SEAT León TDI (Mk2)	135	(United Kingdom) Andrew Hack	1
(Netherlands) Red Camel-Jordans.nl	SEAT León TDI (Mk2)	135	(United Kingdom) Daniel Wheeler	1
(Netherlands) Red Camel-Jordans.nl	SEAT León TDI (Mk2)	135	(Germany) Christian Puth	2–3
(Netherlands) Red Camel-Jordans.nl	SEAT León TDI (Mk2)	135	(Switzerland) Andreas Kempf	2
(Netherlands) Red Camel-Jordans.nl	SEAT León TDI (Mk2)	135	(Netherlands) Christian Dijkhof	3
(Netherlands) Red Camel-Jordans.nl	SEAT León TDI (Mk2)	135	(Netherlands) Henk Thijssen	3
(Netherlands) Cor Euser Racing	BMW 120d (E87)	136	(Netherlands) Huub Delnoij	2
(Netherlands) Cor Euser Racing	BMW 120d (E87)	136	(Netherlands) Cor Euser	2
(Netherlands) Cor Euser Racing	BMW 120d (E87)	136	(United States) Hal Prewitt	2
(Netherlands) Cor Euser Racing	BMW 120d (E87)	136	(Germany) Dirk Schulz	2
(Lithuania) KAUKAS	Volkswagen Golf (Mk7)	137	(Lithuania) Sigitas Ambrazevičius	5
(Lithuania) KAUKAS	Volkswagen Golf (Mk7)	137	(Lithuania) Martynas Giknius	5
(Lithuania) KAUKAS	Volkswagen Golf (Mk7)	137	(Lithuania) Igoris Ivanovas	5
(Lithuania) KAUKAS	Volkswagen Golf (Mk7)	137	(Lithuania) Kęstutis Vilkas	5
(United Kingdom) KPM Racing	Volkswagen Golf (Mk7)	138	(United Kingdom) Lucas Orrock	1–2
(United Kingdom) KPM Racing	Volkswagen Golf (Mk7)	138	(United Kingdom) Tom Wilson	1–2
(United Kingdom) KPM Racing	Volkswagen Golf (Mk7)	138	(Spain) Javier Morcillo	1
(United Kingdom) KPM Racing	Volkswagen Golf (Mk7)	138	(Poland) Gosia Rdest	1
(United Kingdom) KPM Racing	Volkswagen Golf (Mk7)	138	(United Kingdom) Matt Neal	2
(Hungary) RCM Motorsport	SEAT León TDI (Mk2)	139	(Hungary) László Csuti	3, 5
(Hungary) RCM Motorsport	SEAT León TDI (Mk2)	139	(Hungary) Witold Elekfy	3, 5
(Hungary) RCM Motorsport	SEAT León TDI (Mk2)	139	(Hungary) Norbert Nagy	3, 5
(Hungary) RCM Motorsport	SEAT León TDI (Mk2)	139	(Hungary) Bálint Hatvani	3
(Hungary) RCM Motorsport	SEAT León TDI (Mk2)	139	(Hungary) Gábor Kismarty-Lechner	5
(Hungary) RCM Motorsport	SEAT León TDI (Mk2)	139	(Hungary) Attila Tassi	5
(United Arab Emirates) SVDP Racing	BMW 120d (E87)	140	(South Africa) Kris Budnik	4
(United Arab Emirates) SVDP Racing	BMW 120d (E87)	140	(Netherlands) Wubbe Herlaar	4
(United Arab Emirates) SVDP Racing	BMW 120d (E87)	140	(United Arab Emirates) Jason O'Keefe	4
(United Arab Emirates) SVDP Racing	BMW 120d (E87)	140	(United Arab Emirates) Spencer Vanderpal	4
(United Arab Emirates) SVDP Racing	BMW 120d (E87)	140	(Australia) Christopher Wishart	4
(Switzerland) TTC-Racing	Volkswagen Golf TDI (Mk5)	141	(Switzerland) Andreas Kempf	5
(Switzerland) TTC-Racing	Volkswagen Golf TDI (Mk5)	141	(Austria) Klaus Kresnik	5
(Switzerland) TTC-Racing	Volkswagen Golf TDI (Mk5)	141	(Switzerland) Daniel Schilliger	5

== Results and standings ==
=== Race results ===
Classes	(United Arab Emirates) Dubai (Round 1)	(Italy) Mugello (Round 2)	(Netherlands) Zandvoort (Round 3)	(France) Paul Ricard (Round 4)	(Spain) Barcelona (Round 5)	(Czech Republic) Brno (Round 6)
A6 Winners	(Germany) No. 2 Black Falcon	(Germany) No. 7 HB Racing Team Herberth	(Switzerland) No. 10 Hofor-Racing	(United Kingdom) No. 30 Ram Racing	(Austria) No. 2 HP Racing	(Czech Republic) No. 11 Scuderia Praha
A6 Winners	(Netherlands) Yelmer Buurman (Saudi Arabia) Abdulaziz Al Faisal (Germany) Hubert Haupt (United Kingdom) Oliver Webb	(Switzerland) Daniel Allemann (Germany) Ralf Bohn (Germany) Alfred Renauer (Germany) Robert Renauer	(Switzerland) Roland Eggimann (Netherlands) Christiaan Frankenhout (Germany) Kenneth Heyer (Switzerland) Michael Kroll	(United Kingdom) Adam Christodoulou (Germany) Thomas Jäger (United Kingdom) Tom Onslow-Cole (United Kingdom) Paul White	(United States) Sean Johnston (Austria) Reinhard Kofler (Austria) Hari Proczyk (Germany) Reinhold Renger (Germany) Bernd Schneider	(Czech Republic) Jaromír Jiřík (Netherlands) Peter Kox (Italy) Matteo Malucelli (Czech Republic) Jiří Písařík
997 Winners	(Germany) No. 26 Black Falcon	(France) No. 17 Ruffier Racing	(Austria) No. 52 MSG Motorsport	(France) No. 17 Ruffier Racing	(France) No. 17 Ruffier Racing	(Austria) No. 51 MSG Motorsport
997 Winners	(Saudi Arabia) Saud Al Faisal (Denmark) Anders Fjordbach (Japan) Keita Sawa (Germany) Andreas Weishaupt	(France) Gabriel Abergel (France) Patrice Lafargue (France) Paul Lafargue	(Germany) Kim Hauschild (Austria) Martin Konrad (Austria) Luca Rettenbacher (Austria) Felix Wimmer	(France) Gabriel Abergel (France) Dimitri Enjalbert (France) Patrice Lafargue (France) Paul Lafargue	(France) Gabriel Abergel (France) Dimitri Enjalbert (France) Patrice Lafargue (France) Paul Lafargue	(Austria) Klaus Bachler (Austria) Luca Rettenbacher (Austria) Felix Wimmer
SPX Winners (Note: After the season ended Creventic decided to merge the SPX class into the SP2 class due to the low amount of SPX class entries. The only entries were the Huracáns of Sportec Motorsport and Leipert Motorsport.)	No entries				(Germany) No. 22 Leipert Motorsport	(Germany) No. 22 Leipert Motorsport
SPX Winners	No entries				(Finland) Mikko Eskelinen (Russia) Vadim Gitlin (Germany) Marcel Leipert (Norway) Ulrik Roland Pedersen (Spain) Isaac Tutumlu	(Russia) Vadim Gitlin (Spain) Isaac Tutumlu (United Kingdom) Adrian Watt
SP2 Winners	No. 91 MARC Cars Australia	No. 91 MARC Cars Australia	No. 91 MARC Cars Australia	No. 92 MARC Cars Australia	(Slovakia) No. 66 ARC Bratislava	(Czech Republic) No. 44 RPD Racing
SP2 Winners	(Australia) Tony Alford (Australia) Tarek Elgammal (Papua New Guinea) Keith Kassulke (Australia) Peter Leemhuis (Australia) Duvashen Padayachee	(Australia) Jake Camilleri (Papua New Guinea) Keith Kassulke (Australia) Peter Leemhuis (Australia) Ryan McLeod	(Australia) Ben Gersekowski (Qatar) Amro Al-Hamad (Australia) Gary Jacobson (United Kingdom) James Kaye	(United Kingdom) James Kaye (Australia) Peter Leemhuis (Australia) Hadrian Morrall (United Kingdom) Jeff Smith	(Slovakia) Miro Horňák (Slovakia) Matej Konopka (Slovakia) Miro Konôpka (Slovakia) Zdeno Mikuláško	(Italy) Matteo Cressoni (Slovakia) Jozef Jakubik (Slovakia) Lubomír Jakubik (Czech Republic) Dušan Palcr
SP3 Winners	(United Kingdom) No. 163 Optimum Motorsport	(United Kingdom) No. 163 Optimum Motorsport	(Netherlands) No. 160 Cor Euser Racing	(Italy) No. 206 Nova Race	(United Kingdom) No. 43 APO Sport	(Germany) No. 174 Walkenhorst Motorsport
SP3 Winners	(United Kingdom) Adrian Barwick (United Kingdom) Bradley Ellis (United Kingdom) Euan Hankey (Turkey) Salih Yoluç	(United Kingdom) Adrian Barwick (United Kingdom) Bradley Ellis (United Kingdom) Flick Haigh	(United Kingdom) Sam Allpass (Netherlands) Huub Delnoij (Netherlands) Cor Euser (United States) Hal Prewitt	(Italy) Andrea Barenghi (Sweden) Fredrik Blomstedt (France) Philippe Cimadomo (Italy) Carlo Mantori	(United Kingdom) James May (United Kingdom) Paul May (United Kingdom) Alex Osborne	(Germany) Dirk Adorf (Sweden) Victor Bouveng (New Zealand) Nick Cassidy (United States) Trent Hindman
A5 Winners	(Germany) No. 75 Hofor-Kuepper Racing	(Austria) No. 31 Duller Motorsport	(Germany) No. 75 Hofor-Kuepper Racing	(Germany) No. 75 Hofor-Kuepper Racing	(United Kingdom) No. 84 Intersport Racing	(Czech Republic) No. 82 Duck Racing
A5 Winners	(Switzerland) Chantal Kroll (Switzerland) Martin Kroll (Germany) Bernd Küpper (United States) Hal Prewitt (Switzerland) Sarah Toniutti	(Austria) Herwig Duller (Austria) Michael Fischer (Austria) Markus Weege	(Switzerland) Chantal Kroll (Switzerland) Martin Kroll (Germany) Bernd Küpper (Germany) Lars Jürgen Zander	(Switzerland) Chantal Kroll (Switzerland) Martin Kroll (Germany) Bernd Küpper (Belarus) Siarhei Paulavets (France) Fabrice Reicher	(United Kingdom) Kevin Clarke (United Kingdom) Adam Hayes (United Kingdom) Ryan Lindsay (United Kingdom) Mark Radcliffe	(Czech Republic) Lumír Firla (Czech Republic) Daniel Skalický (Czech Republic) Dan Suchý
D2 Winners	No entries		(Lithuania) No. 145 RIMO	(United Kingdom) No. 146 Saxon Motorsport	(United Kingdom) No. 146 Saxon Motorsport	(Lithuania) No. 145 RIMO
D2 Winners	No entries		(Lithuania) Rimantas Blažulionis (Lithuania) Martynas Samuiti (Lithuania) Saulius Vitkauskas	(United Kingdom) Sam Allpass (United Kingdom) Nick Barrow (United Kingdom) Tom Barrow (United Kingdom) Jamie Morrow	(United Kingdom) Nick Barrow (United Kingdom) Tom Barrow (United Kingdom) Jamie Morrow (United Kingdom) David Robinson	(Lithuania) Rimantas Blažulionis (Lithuania) Martynas Samuiti (Lithuania) Saulius Vitkauskas
A3T Winners	(Lebanon) No. 95 Memac Ogilvy Duel Racing	(Netherlands) No. 98 NKPP Racing	(France) No. 205 Team Altran	(France) No. 208 Team Altran	(Lebanon) No. 95 Memac Ogilvy Duel Racing	(France) No. 205 Team Altran
A3T Winners	(United Kingdom) Nabil Moutran (United Kingdom) Ramzi Moutran (United Kingdom) Sami Moutran (United Kingdom) Phil Quaife	(Netherlands) Roger Grouwels (Netherlands) Harry Hilders	(Denmark) Kim Holmgaard (France) François Riaux (France) Philippe Vulin	(Spain) Gonzalo de Andrés (France) Gaëtan Bischoff (France) Steven Palette (France) Guillaume Roman	(United Kingdom) Nabil Moutran (United Kingdom) Ramzi Moutran (United Kingdom) Sami Moutran (United Kingdom) Phil Quaife	(Belgium) Sarah Bovy (France) Mathieu Sentis (France) Stéphane Ventaja
CUP1 Winners	(Netherlands) No. 76 Racingdivas by Las Moras	(Germany) No. 73 Bonk Motorsport	(Germany) No. 73 Bonk Motorsport	(Germany) No. 67 Securtal Sorg Rennsport	(Luxembourg) No. 79 DUWO Racing	(Germany) No. 72 Bonk Motorsport
CUP1 Winners	(Netherlands) Liesette Braams (Germany) Max Partl (Netherlands) Sandra van der Sloot (Netherlands) Gaby Uljee	(Germany) Emin Akata (Germany) Michael Bonk (Netherlands) Liesette Braams (Germany) Michael Schrey	(Germany) Alexander Mies (Germany) Michael Schrey	(Germany) Nicolas Griebner (Germany) Felix Günther (Germany) Thomas Müller (Germany) Daniel Sorg (Austria) Michael Steffny	(Russia) Max Aronov (Luxembourg) Jean-Marie Dumont (Austria) Gustav Engljähringer (Luxembourg) Maurice Faber (Luxembourg) Dylan Pereira	(Germany) Axel Burghardt (Poland) Maciej Dreszer (Germany) Michael Schrey
A2 Winners	(Belgium) No. 117 VDS Racing Adventures	(Denmark) No. 115 Team K-Rejser	(Switzerland) No. 112 presenza.eu	(Switzerland) No. 112 presenza.eu	(France) No. 119 Milan Compétition	(Switzerland) No. 112 presenza.eu
A2 Winners	(Belgium) José Close (Belgium) Michaël Divoy (Belgium) Grégory Paisse (Belgium) Raphaël van der Straten	(Denmark) Jan Engelbrecht (Denmark) Jacob Kristensen (Denmark) Per Poulsen	(Netherlands) Martijn Kool (Italy) Luigi Stanco (Switzerland) Stefan Tanner	(Netherlands) Christian Dijkhof (Netherlands) Michel Schaap (Italy) Luigi Stanco (Switzerland) Stefan Tanner (Switzerland) Sarah Toniutti	(France) Jean-Louis Daughter (France) Denis Gibaud (France) Jérôme Maudet (Portugal) Carlos Tavares	(Austria) Klaus Kresnik (Italy) Luigi Stanco (Switzerland) Stefan Tanner
D1 Winners	(United Kingdom) No. 138 KPM Racing	(United Kingdom) No. 138 KPM Racing	(Hungary) No. 139 RCM Motorsport	(United Arab Emirates) No. 140 SVDP Racing	(Lithuania) No. 137 KAUKAS	No entries
D1 Winners	(Spain) Javier Morcillo (United Kingdom) Lucas Orrock (Poland) Gosia Rdest (United Kingdom) Tom Wilson	(United Kingdom) Matt Neal (United Kingdom) Lucas Orrock (United Kingdom) Tom Wilson	(Hungary) László Csuti (Hungary) Witold Elekfy (Hungary) Bálint Hatvani (Hungary) Norbert Nagy	(South Africa) Kris Budnik (Netherlands) Wubbe Herlaar (United Arab Emirates) Jason O'Keefe (United Arab Emirates) Spencer Vanderpal (Australia) Christopher Wishart	(Lithuania) Sigitas Ambrazevičius (Lithuania) Martynas Giknius (Lithuania) Igoris Ivanovas (Lithuania) Kęstutis Vilkas	No entries

=== Scoring system ===
Each driver's and team's lowest-scoring round was dropped from their total.

Position	**1st**	**2nd**	**3rd**	**4th**	**5th**	**6th**	**7th**	**8th**	**9th**	**10th**
12H Races	20	18	16	14	12	10	8	6	4	2
24H Races	30	27	24	21	18	15	12	9	6	4

=== Drivers' Championships (Top 10) ===
==== A6 ====
Pos.	Driver	Team	DUB (United Arab Emirates)	MUG (Italy)	ZAN (Netherlands)	LEC (France)	CAT (Spain)	BRN (Czech Republic)	Total
1	(United Kingdom) Tom Onslow-Cole	(United Kingdom) Ram Racing	2	(2)	2	**1**	3	2	117 (135)
1	(Germany) Thomas Jäger	(United Kingdom) Ram Racing	2		2	**1**	3	2	117
2	(United Kingdom) Paul White	(United Kingdom) KPM Racing	3						114 (132)
2	(United Kingdom) Paul White	(United Kingdom) Ram Racing		(2)	2	**1**	3	2	114 (132)
3	(Czech Republic) Jiří Písařík	(Czech Republic) Scuderia Praha	6^{1}	(51)	5	4	14	**1**	95 (105)
3	(Netherlands) Peter Kox	(Czech Republic) Scuderia Praha	6^{1}		5	4	14	**1**	95
4	(Italy) Matteo Malucelli	(Czech Republic) Scuderia Praha	6^{1}	51		4	14	**1**	93
5	(Netherlands) Christiaan Frankenhout (Germany) Kenneth Heyer (Switzerland) Michael Kroll	(Switzerland) Hofor-Racing	88	3	**1**	13	2	4	92
6	(Czech Republic) Jaromír Jiřík	(Czech Republic) Scuderia Praha	6^{1}	51	5	4	14	WD	85
7	(Switzerland) Roland Eggimann	(Switzerland) Hofor-Racing	88	3	**1**	13	2	9	82
8	(Switzerland) Chantal Kroll	(Switzerland) Hofor-Racing		3	11	13	2	4	80
9	(United Kingdom) Adam Christodoulou	(United Kingdom) Ram Racing	2	2		**1**			75
10	(Germany) Reinhold Renger	(Austria) HP Racing			3	3	1		70

Colour	Result
Gold	Winner
Silver	Second place
Bronze	Third place
Green	Points classification
Blue	Non-points classification
Blue	Non-classified finish (NC)
Purple	Retired, not classified (Ret)
Red	Did not qualify (DNQ)
Red	Did not pre-qualify (DNPQ)
Black	Disqualified (DSQ)
White	Did not start (DNS)
White	Withdrew (WD)
White	Race cancelled (C)
Blank	Did not practice (DNP)
Blank	Did not arrive (DNA)
Blank	Excluded (EX)

**Bold** – Pole
Italics – Fastest Lap
(parentheses) - Round dropped from total

Notes

- **^1** – Jaromír Jiřík, Peter Kox, Matteo Malucelli and Jiří Písařík finished 6th overall, but 4th in the A6-Pro class at the 24H Dubai. Two A6-Am class entries were classified higher than Jiřík, Kox, Malucelli and Písařík, but after the merge of the A6-Pro and A6-Am classes they retained their points awarded for their 4th position.

==== 997 ====
Pos.	Driver	Team	DUB (United Arab Emirates)	MUG (Italy)	ZAN (Netherlands)	LEC (France)	CAT (Spain)	BRN (Czech Republic)	Total
1	(France) Gabriel Abergel (France) Patrice Lafargue (France) Paul Lafargue	(France) Ruffier Racing	12	6		**5**	4		101
2	(France) Benoît Fretin (France) Michel Mitieus	(France) B2F Compétition	17	11	15		50	26	72
3	(France) Gilles Blasco (France) Frédéric Lelièvre (France) Philippe Polette	(France) Porsche Lorient Racing		7	16	**10**		12	69
4	(France) Dimitri Enjalbert	(France) Ruffier Racing				**5**	4		60
5	(United States) Charles Espenlaub (United States) Charlie Putman	(Germany) MRS GT-Racing		**47**	7	27	21	**31**	59
6	(France) Bruno Fretin	(France) B2F Compétition	17	11	15		50		56
7	(Austria) Luca Rettenbacher (Austria) Felix Wimmer	(Austria) MSG Motorsport		10	**6**	51†		8	54
8	(Switzerland) Manuel Nicolaidis	(Germany) MRS GT-Racing	24						52
8	(Switzerland) Manuel Nicolaidis	(Switzerland) Classica Motors by RMS		9			5		52
9	(France) Frédéric Ancel	(France) Porsche Lorient Racing			16	**10**		12	51
10	(France) Alain Demorge (France) Jean-François Demorge (France) Benjamin Roy	(France) Porsche Lorient Racing		12	10	18		38	48

Notes

- Drivers denoted by † did not complete sufficient laps in order to score points.

==== SP2 ====
Pos.	Driver	Team	DUB (United Arab Emirates)	MUG (Italy)	ZAN (Netherlands)	LEC (France)	CAT (Spain)	BRN (Czech Republic)	Total
1	(Australia) Peter Leemhuis	MARC Cars Australia	33	14	19	8	24	(13)	119 (135)
1	(United Kingdom) James Kaye	MARC Cars Australia	46	(34)	12	8	20	11	119 (135)
2	(Papua New Guinea) Keith Kassulke	MARC Cars Australia	33	14	19	(40)	20	13	108 (120)
3	(Australia) Jake Camilleri	MARC Cars Australia	61	14	19	11	24	(13)	104 (120)
4	(France) Lionel Amrouche	(France) GC Automobile	**63**	**(52)**	**35**		15	39	93 (107)
4	(France) Lionel Amrouche	(Germany) Leipert Motorsport				23			93 (107)
5	(Australia) Ben Gersekowski	MARC Cars Australia		34	12	40	20		72
6	(Netherlands) Ivo Breukers	(Netherlands) Red Camel-Jordans.nl	55	54		20		40	69
7	(Australia) Malcolm Niall	MARC Cars Australia	61			11		11	63
8	(Australia) Ryan McLeod	MARC Cars Australia	46	14		40	20†		59
9	(Netherlands) Rik Breukers	(Netherlands) Red Camel-Jordans.nl	55			20		40	57
10	(Australia) Duvashen Padayachee	MARC Cars Australia	33				24		51

Notes

- Drivers denoted by † did not complete sufficient laps in order to score points.

==== SP3 ====
Pos.	Driver	Team	DUB (United Arab Emirates)	MUG (Italy)	ZAN (Netherlands)	LEC (France)	CAT (Spain)	BRN (Czech Republic)	Total
1	(United Kingdom) John Gilbert (United Kingdom) Devon Modell	(United Kingdom) Speedworks Motorsport	29	20	14	48	35	(48)	100 (108)
2	(United Kingdom) Tony Hughes	(United Kingdom) Speedworks Motorsport	22	**(60)**	**46**	48		45	95 (99)
2	(United Kingdom) Tony Hughes	(United Kingdom) CWS 4x4					25		95 (99)
3	(Netherlands) Cor Euser (United States) Hal Prewitt	(Netherlands) Cor Euser Racing		35	9	50	11	**30**	92
4	(Germany) Oliver Bender (United Kingdom) Paul Follett	(Germany) Securtal Sorg Rennsport	42	24	33	**55**		28	83
5	(United Kingdom) Adrian Barwick (United Kingdom) Bradley Ellis	(United Kingdom) Optimum Motorsport	**20**	16			34		71
6	(United Kingdom) Flick Haigh	(United Kingdom) Speedworks Motorsport	29						65
6	(United Kingdom) Flick Haigh	(United Kingdom) Optimum Motorsport		16			34		65
6	(Germany) Frank Elsässer	(Germany) Securtal Sorg Rennsport	42	24	33	**55**			65
7	(United Kingdom) Henry Fletcher	(Italy) Nova Race	66	21		39			59
7	(United Kingdom) Ross Warburton	(United Kingdom) Speedworks Motorsport	22	**60**	**46**		35		59
8	(Netherlands) Huub Delnoij	(Netherlands) Cor Euser Racing		35	9		11		57
9	(Italy) Roberto Ferri	(Italy) Nova Race	66	39		39			53
10	(Italy) Carlo Mantori	(Italy) Nova Race		19		19			53

==== A5/D2 ====
Creventic decided after the season ended to split the diesel-powered cars from the gasoline-powered cars creating the D2 class. Although they are separate classes, if for example the highest classified D2 class entry finishes one position in front of the highest classified A5 class entry, the A5 class entry will not receive points for 1st position.

Pos.	Driver	Team	DUB (United Arab Emirates)	MUG (Italy)	ZAN (Netherlands)	LEC (France)	CAT (Spain)	BRN (Czech Republic)	Total
A5
1	(Germany) Bernd Küpper	(Germany) Hofor-Kuepper Racing	34	(43)	21^{2}	**43**	44^{2}	21	117 (135)
1	(Switzerland) Martin Kroll	(Germany) Hofor-Kuepper Racing	34	43	21^{2}	**43**	44^{2}	21†	117
1	(Switzerland) Chantal Kroll	(Germany) Hofor-Kuepper Racing	34		21^{2}	**43**	44^{2}	21	117
2	(Belarus) Siarhei Paulavets	(Czech Republic) RTR Projects	72	66	39^{2}				99
2	(Belarus) Siarhei Paulavets	(Germany) Hofor-Kuepper Racing				**43**	44^{2}		99
2	(Belarus) Siarhei Paulavets	(Czech Republic) BP Autosport - HTRT						WD	99
3	(United States) Hal Prewitt	(Germany) Hofor-Kuepper Racing	34						71
3	(United States) Hal Prewitt	(Netherlands) Cor Euser Racing			43^{2}	47		**43**^{2}	71
4	(Czech Republic) Milan Kodídek (Czech Republic) Tomas Miniberger	(Czech Republic) RTR Projects	72	66	39^{2}				48
5	(New Zealand) Maurice O'Reilley	(Denmark) Scangrip Racing			34^{2}				39
5	(New Zealand) Maurice O'Reilley	(Netherlands) Cor Euser Racing				47			39
6	(Germany) Lars Jürgen Zander	(Germany) Hofor-Kuepper Racing		43	21^{2}				36
7	(Czech Republic) Michal Vitek	(Czech Republic) RTR Projects	72						34
7	(Czech Republic) Michal Vitek	(Czech Republic) BP Autosport - HTRT						36^{2}	34
8	(Czech Republic) Tomas Kwolek	(Czech Republic) RTR Projects	72		39^{2}				32
9	(Switzerland) Sarah Toniutti	(Germany) Hofor-Kuepper Racing	34						30
9	(France) Fabrice Reicher	(Germany) Hofor-Kuepper Racing				**43**			30
10	(Netherlands) Gijs Bessem (Netherlands) Roger Grouwels (Netherlands) Harry Hilders (Netherlands) Daan Meijer	(Netherlands) JR Motorsport	57						27
10	(United States) Jim Briody (United States) Lance Miller	(Netherlands) Cor Euser Racing				47			27
D2
1	(United Kingdom) Nick Barrow (United Kingdom) Tom Barrow (United Kingdom) Jamie Morrow	(United Kingdom) Saxon Motorsport				**54**	17		54
2	(United Kingdom) David Robinson	(United Kingdom) Saxon Motorsport					17		30
3	(United Kingdom) Sam Allpass	(United Kingdom) Saxon Motorsport				**54**			24
4	(Lithuania) Rimantas Blažulionis (Lithuania) Martynas Samuitis (Lithuania) Saulius Vitkauskas	(Lithuania) RIMO			**36**^{2}			**47**^{2}	16
5	(Netherlands) Jeroen den Boer (Netherlands) Mark Bus (Netherlands) Simon Knap (Netherlands) Bas van de Ven	(Netherlands) MDM Motorsport					**68**^{2}		12

Notes

- **^2** – At the 12H Zandvoort there were only three A3T class entries. They were put in the A5 class due to the low amount of entries and therefore the A3T class was a class within the A5 class itself. At the last two rounds of the season the CUP1 class entries were put in the A5 class due to a low amount of entries and therefore the CUP1 class was also a class within the A5 class itself. In cases where A3T class entries at Zandvoort or CUP1 class entries at the last two races finished in front of an A5 class entry, it is denoted by this ^{"2"}. If an A3T class or CUP1 class entry finished in front of an A5 class entry, the drivers of the A5 class entry would not receive more points. For example: the A3T class No. 205 Team Altran entry won in the A5 class at Zandvoort and the A5 class No. 75 Hofor-Kuepper Racing entry finished 2nd, but the drivers of the No. 75 Hofor-Kuepper Racing entry were awarded points for 2nd position, despite being the highest classified A5 class entry. This also applies to the D2 class.
- Drivers denoted by † did not complete sufficient laps in order to score points.

==== A3T ====
At the 12H Zandvoort there were only three A3T class entries. They were put in the A5 class due to the low amount of entries and therefore the A3T class was a class within the A5 class itself. The position in the A5 class decided the number of points awarded, not the position in the A3T class.

Pos.	Driver	Team	DUB (United Arab Emirates)	MUG (Italy)	ZAN (Netherlands)	LEC (France)	CAT (Spain)	BRN (Czech Republic)	Total
1	(United Kingdom) Nabil Moutran (United Kingdom) Ramzi Moutran (United Kingdom) Sami Moutran (United Kingdom) Phil Quaife	(Lebanon) Memac Ogilvy Duel Racing	**27**	18		16	**13**	**15**	120
2	(France) Guillaume Roman	(France) Team Altran		38	**22**	14	18	18	92
3	(Netherlands) Harry Hilders	(Netherlands) NKPP Racing		13		15	19	17	84
4	(Netherlands) Gijs Bessem	(Netherlands) NKPP Racing				15	19	17	64
5	(France) François Riaux	(France) Team Altran		63	20	21	55	18	59
6	(Spain) Gonzalo de Andrés	(France) Team Altran		38		14		18	52
7	(France) Marc Rostan	(France) Team Altran				21	18		45
8	(Denmark) Kim Holmgaard	(France) Team Altran			20		18		44
9	(Netherlands) Roger Grouwels	(Netherlands) NKPP Racing		13			19		41
10	(Austria) Michael Kogler (Austria) Peter Schöller	AllcarTuning Racing Team Austria	56	45				35	40

==== CUP1 ====
At the last two rounds of the season the CUP1 class entries were put in the A5 class due to a low amount of entries and therefore the CUP1 class was a class within the A5 class itself. The position in the A5 class decided the number of points awarded, not the position in the CUP1 class.

Pos.	Driver	Team	DUB (United Arab Emirates)	MUG (Italy)	ZAN (Netherlands)	LEC (France)	CAT (Spain)	BRN (Czech Republic)	Total
1	(Austria) Gustav Engljähringer	(Austria) MISSION POSSIBLE RACING	49	42	26	**34**			99
1	(Austria) Gustav Engljähringer	(Luxembourg) DUWO Racing					32		99
2	(Poland) Maciej Dreszer	(Germany) Securtal Sorg Rennsport		30			**64**		87
2	(Poland) Maciej Dreszer	(Luxembourg) DUWO Racing			30				87
2	(Poland) Maciej Dreszer	(Austria) MISSION POSSIBLE RACING				**34**			87
2	(Poland) Maciej Dreszer	(Germany) Bonk Motorsport						**25**	87
3	(Luxembourg) Jean-Marie Dumont (Luxembourg) Maurice Faber	(Luxembourg) DUWO Racing			30		32		68
3	(Luxembourg) Jean-Marie Dumont (Luxembourg) Maurice Faber	(Germany) Bonk Motorsport				26			68
4	(Germany) Michael Schrey	(Germany) Bonk Motorsport		**29**	**18**			**25**	56
5	(Germany) Axel Burghardt	(Germany) Bonk Motorsport		55	DSQ	26		**25**	55
6	(Netherlands) Liesette Braams	(Netherlands) Racingdivas by Las Moras	23						50
6	(Netherlands) Liesette Braams	(Germany) Bonk Motorsport		**29**					50
7	(Germany) Michael Bonk	(Germany) Bonk Motorsport		**29**	DSQ	26			47
8	(Russia) Max Aronov	(Germany) Securtal Sorg Rennsport			24				45
8	(Russia) Max Aronov	(Luxembourg) DUWO Racing					32		45
9	(Germany) Ulf Wickop	(Germany) Securtal Sorg Rennsport		30					34
9	(Germany) Ulf Wickop	(Austria) MISSION POSSIBLE RACING			26				34
10	(Netherlands) Mike Smit	(Austria) MISSION POSSIBLE RACING	49	42					32

==== A2/D1 ====
Creventic decided after the season ended to split the diesel-powered cars from the gasoline-powered cars creating the D1 class. Although they are separate classes, if for example the highest classified D1 class entry finishes one position in front of the highest classified A2 class entry, the A2 class entry will not receive points for 1st position. This applies to all rounds of the season with the exception of the 24H Barcelona.

Pos.	Driver	Team	DUB (United Arab Emirates)	MUG (Italy)	ZAN (Netherlands)	LEC (France)	CAT (Spain)	BRN (Czech Republic)	Total
A2
1	(Italy) Luigi Stanco (Switzerland) Stefan Tanner	(Switzerland) presenza.eu Racing Team Clio	43	(40)	25	28	39	33	106 (120)
2	(Denmark) Mads Christensen (Denmark) Peter Obel (Denmark) Martin Sally Pedersen	(Denmark) Team Sally Racing	44	33	41	31	38		84
3	(United Kingdom) Chris Bentley (United Kingdom) Ricky Coomber (United Kingdom) Tom Gannon	(United Kingdom) RKC/TGM		50	28	53	33	46	71
4	(Denmark) Jan Engelbrecht (Denmark) Jacob Kristensen	(Denmark) Team K-Rejser	80	**28**	**32**	44	**48**		55
5	(Netherlands) Christian Dijkhof (Netherlands) Michel Schaap	(Switzerland) presenza.eu Racing Team Clio				28	39		48
6	(Belgium) Raphaël van der Straten	(Belgium) VDS Racing Adventures	25		29				46
6	(Belgium) Raphaël van der Straten	(France) eXigence MOTORSPORT				DNS			46
6	(Belgium) José Close (Belgium) Grégory Paisse	(Belgium) VDS Racing Adventures	25		29				46
7	(Switzerland) Sarah Toniutti	(Switzerland) presenza.eu Racing Team Clio				28	45		42
8	(France) Benoît Carreras	(France) Autosport GP	50			29			36
8	(Denmark) Ole Klitgård (Denmark) Sonny Nielsen (Denmark) Niels Nyboe (Denmark) Tim Söderhamn	(Denmark) au2parts / DK Racing Event		44			37		36
9	(Denmark) Sune Marcussen	(Denmark) Team Sally Racing	44	33		31†			31
10	(Belgium) Michaël Divoy	(Belgium) VDS Racing Adventures	25						30
10	(France) Jean-Louis Daughter (France) Denis Gibaud (France) Jérôme Maudet (Portugal) Carlos Tavares	(France) Milan Compétition Michel Vaillant					28		30
10	(United Kingdom) John Clonis	(United Kingdom) RKC/TGM		50	28	53			30
10	(France) Antoine Boulay (France) Jérôme Thiery (France) Franck Traynard	(France) Autosport GP	50			32			30
10	(Switzerland) Stephan Jäggi (Switzerland) Marc Schelling	(Switzerland) presenza.eu Racing Team Clio	43				45		30
D1
1	(Hungary) László Csuti (Hungary) Witold Elekfy (Hungary) Norbert Nagy	(Hungary) RCM Motorsport			**37**		**59**		39
2	(Austria) Klaus Kresnik	(Netherlands) Red Camel-Jordans.nl	**70**	**48**					34
2	(Austria) Klaus Kresnik	(Switzerland) TTC-Racing					65		34
2	(Switzerland) Andreas Kempf	(Netherlands) Red Camel-Jordans.nl		**48**					34
2	(Switzerland) Andreas Kempf	(Switzerland) TTC-Racing					65		34
3	(Lithuania) Sigitas Ambrazevičius (Lithuania) Martynas Giknius (Lithuania) Igoris Ivanovas (Lithuania) Kęstutis Vilkas	(Lithuania) KAUKAS					29		30
4	(Hungary) Gábor Kismarty-Lechner (Hungary) Attila Tassi	(Hungary) RCM Motorsport					**59**		27
5	(United Kingdom) Lucas Orrock (United Kingdom) Tom Wilson	(United Kingdom) KPM Racing	51	31					24
5	(Switzerland) Daniel Schilliger	(Switzerland) TTC-Racing					65		24
6	(Germany) Christian Puth	(Netherlands) Red Camel-Jordans.nl		**48**	40				20
7	(United Kingdom) Matt Neal	(United Kingdom) KPM Racing		31					18
7	(South Africa) Kris Budnik (Netherlands) Wubbe Herlaar (United Arab Emirates) Jason O'Keefe (United Arab Emirates) Spencer Vanderpal (Australia) Christopher Wishart	(United Arab Emirates) SVDP Racing				**37**			18
8	(Hungary) Bálint Hatvani	(Hungary) RCM Motorsport			**37**				12
9	(Netherlands) Christian Dijkhof (Netherlands) Henk Thijssen	(Netherlands) Red Camel-Jordans.nl			40				10
10	(Spain) Javier Morcillo (Poland) Gosia Rdest	(United Kingdom) KPM Racing	51						6

Notes

- Drivers denoted by † did not complete sufficient laps in order to score points.

==== Overall ====
Pos.	Driver	Team	Class	DUB (United Arab Emirates)	MUG (Italy)	ZAN (Netherlands)	LEC (France)	CAT (Spain)	BRN (Czech Republic)	Total
1	(Switzerland) Chantal Kroll	(Germany) Hofor-Kuepper Racing	A5	34		21	**43**		21	123 (139)
1	(Switzerland) Chantal Kroll	(Switzerland) Hofor-Racing	A6		(3)			2		123 (139)
2	(United Kingdom) Nabil Moutran (United Kingdom) Ramzi Moutran (United Kingdom) Sami Moutran (United Kingdom) Phil Quaife	(Lebanon) Memac Ogilvy Duel Racing	A3T	**27**	18		16	**13**	**15**	120
3	(Australia) Peter Leemhuis	MARC Cars Australia	SP2	33	14	19	8	24	(13)	119 (135)
3	(United Kingdom) James Kaye	MARC Cars Australia	SP2	46	(34)	12	8	20	11	119 (135)
4	(United States) Hal Prewitt	(Germany) Hofor-Kuepper Racing	A5	34			47			118 (128)
4	(United States) Hal Prewitt	(Netherlands) Cor Euser Racing	SP3		(35)	9		11	**30**	118 (128)
5	(Germany) Bernd Küpper	(Germany) Hofor-Kuepper Racing	A5	34	(43)	21	**43**	44	21	117 (135)
5	(Switzerland) Martin Kroll	(Germany) Hofor-Kuepper Racing	A5	34	43	21	**43**	44	21†	117
5	(United Kingdom) Tom Onslow-Cole	(United Kingdom) Ram Racing	A6	2	(2)	2	**1**	3	2	117 (135)
5	(Germany) Thomas Jäger	(United Kingdom) Ram Racing	A6	2		2	**1**	3	2	117
6	(United Kingdom) Paul White	(United Kingdom) KPM Racing	A6	3						114 (132)
6	(United Kingdom) Paul White	(United Kingdom) Ram Racing	A6		(2)	2	**1**	3	2	114 (132)
7	(Netherlands) Harry Hilders	(Netherlands) JR Motorsport	A5	57						111
7	(Netherlands) Harry Hilders	(Netherlands) NKPP Racing	A3T		13		15	19	17	111
8	(Papua New Guinea) Keith Kassulke	MARC Cars Australia	SP2	33	14	19	(40)	20	13	108 (120)
9	(Belarus) Siarhei Paulavets	(Czech Republic) RTR Projects	A5	72	66	(39)				107 (115)
9	(Belarus) Siarhei Paulavets	(Germany) Hofor-Kuepper Racing	A5				**43**	44		107 (115)
9	(Belarus) Siarhei Paulavets	(Czech Republic) RTR Projects	SP3						29	107 (115)
10	(Italy) Luigi Stanco (Switzerland) Stefan Tanner	(Switzerland) presenza.eu Racing Team Clio	A2	43	(40)	25	28	39	33	106 (120)

Notes

- Drivers denoted by † did not complete sufficient laps in order to score points.

==== Ladies' Cup ====
Pos.	Driver	Team	Class	DUB (United Arab Emirates)	MUG (Italy)	ZAN (Netherlands)	LEC (France)	CAT (Spain)	BRN (Czech Republic)	Total
1	(Switzerland) Chantal Kroll	(Germany) Hofor-Kuepper Racing	A5	34		21	**43**		21	123 (139)
1	(Switzerland) Chantal Kroll	(Switzerland) Hofor-Racing	A6		(3)			2		123 (139)
2	(Switzerland) Sarah Toniutti	(Germany) Hofor-Kuepper Racing	A5	34						72
2	(Switzerland) Sarah Toniutti	(Switzerland) presenza.eu Racing Team Clio	A2				28	45		72
3	(United Kingdom) Flick Haigh	(United Kingdom) Speedworks Motorsport	SP3	29						65
3	(United Kingdom) Flick Haigh	(United Kingdom) Optimum Motorsport	SP3		16			34		65
4	(Netherlands) Liesette Braams	(Netherlands) Racingdivas by Las Moras	CUP1	23						50
4	(Netherlands) Liesette Braams	(Germany) Bonk Motorsport	CUP1		**29**					50
5	(Denmark) Nanna Hald Gøtsche	(United Kingdom) Zest Racecar Engineering	A3T		26	44	35			45
5	(Denmark) Nanna Hald Gøtsche	(Germany) Artthea Sport	997					61		45
6	(Netherlands) Sandra van der Sloot (Netherlands) Gaby Uljee	(Netherlands) Racingdivas by Las Moras	CUP1	23						30
7	(Spain) Laia Sanz	(Spain) KH7 - Monlau	A3T					16		27
8	(Belgium) Sarah Bovy	(France) Team Altran	A3T		63				14	24
9	(Switzerland) Cyndie Allemann	(Germany) Car Point S Racing Schmieglitz	A3T	79						21
10	(Poland) Gosia Rdest	(United Kingdom) KPM Racing	D1	51						16
10	(Poland) Gosia Rdest	(Poland) R8 Motorsport	A3T		37					16

=== Teams' Championships (Top 5) ===
==== A6 ====
Pos.	Team	No.	Manufacturer	DUB (United Arab Emirates)	MUG (Italy)	ZAN (Netherlands)	LEC (France)	CAT (Spain)	BRN (Czech Republic)	Total
1	(United Kingdom) Ram Racing	30	Mercedes-Benz	2	(2)	2	**1**	3	2	117 (135)
2	(Czech Republic) Scuderia Praha	4	Ferrari	6^{1}	(51)	5	4	14	**1**	95 (105)
3	(Switzerland) Hofor-Racing 2	10	Mercedes-Benz		3	**1**	13	2	4	92
4	(Austria) HP Racing	2	Mercedes-Benz			3	3	1	5	82
5	(Germany) HB Racing Team Herberth	7	Porsche		1	13	2	63	6	69

Notes

- **^1** – The #4 Scuderia Praha finished 6th overall, but 4th in the A6-Pro class at the 24H Dubai. Two A6-Am class entries were classified higher than the #4 Scuderia Praha but after the merge of the A6-Pro and A6-Am classes the entry retained its points awarded for their 4th position.

Pragma:no-cache

==== 997 ====
Pos.	Team	No.	DUB (United Arab Emirates)	MUG (Italy)	ZAN (Netherlands)	LEC (France)	CAT (Spain)	BRN (Czech Republic)	Total
1	(France) Ruffier Racing	17	12	6		**5**	4		101
2	(France) B2F Compétition	47	17	11	15		50	26	72
3	(France) Porsche Lorient Racing 2	63		7	16	**10**		12	69
4	(Germany) MRS GT-Racing 1	20	24	**47**	7	27	21	**31**	68
5	(France) Porsche Lorient Racing 1	62		12	10	18		38	48

==== SP2 ====
Pos.	Team	No.	Manufacturer	DUB (United Arab Emirates)	MUG (Italy)	ZAN (Netherlands)	LEC (France)	CAT (Spain)	BRN (Czech Republic)	Total
1	MARC Cars Australia 1	91	MARC Cars/Ford	33	14	12	(40)	20	13	110 (122)
2	MARC Cars Australia 2	92	MARC Cars/Ford	46	34	19	8	(53)	11	109 (118)
3	(France) GC Automobile	150	GC Automobile/BMW	**63**	**52**	**35**	33^{2}	40	39	74
4	(Germany) Leipert Motorsport	22	Lamborghini				23	6	**20**	71
5	(Netherlands) Red Camel-Jordans.nl 1	159	MARC Cars/Mazda	55	54		20		40	69

Notes

- **^2** – The team and its drivers of the #150 GC Automobile were ineligible to score points at the 24H Paul Ricard for unknown reasons.

==== SP3 ====
Pos.	Team	No.	Manufacturer	DUB (United Arab Emirates)	MUG (Italy)	ZAN (Netherlands)	LEC (France)	CAT (Spain)	BRN (Czech Republic)	Total
1	(United Kingdom) Speedworks Motorsport 2	170	Aston Martin	29	20	14	48	35	(48)	100 (108)
2	(Netherlands) Cor Euser Racing 1	160	Lotus		35	9	50	11	**30**	92
3	(Germany) Securtal Sorg Rennsport 1	161	BMW	42	24	33	**55**		28	83
4	(United Kingdom) Optimum Motorsport	163	Ginetta	**20**	16			34		71
5	(Italy) Nova Race 2	205	Ginetta	81						57
5	(Italy) Nova Race 2	206	Ginetta		19		19			57

==== A5/D2 ====
Creventic decided after the season ended to split the diesel-powered cars from the gasoline-powered cars creating the D2 class. Although they are separate classes, if for example the highest classified D2 class entry finishes one position in front of the highest classified A5 class entry, the A5 class entry will not receive points for 1st position.

Pos.	Team	No.	Manufacturer	DUB (United Arab Emirates)	MUG (Italy)	ZAN (Netherlands)	LEC (France)	CAT (Spain)	BRN (Czech Republic)	Total
A5
1	(Germany) Hofor-Kuepper Racing	75	BMW	34	(43)	21^{3}	**43**	44^{3}	21	117 (135)
2	(Czech Republic) RTR Projects	80	BMW	72	66	39^{3}				48
3	(Netherlands) Cor Euser Racing 2	83	BMW			43^{3}	47		**43**^{3}	41
4	(Netherlands) JR Motorsport 2	78	BMW	57						27
5	(United Kingdom) Intersport Racing	84	BMW					**41**		24
D2
1	(United Kingdom) Saxon Motorsport	146	BMW				**54**	17		54
2	(Lithuania) RIMO	145	BMW			**36**^{3}			**47**^{3}	16
3	(Netherlands) MDM Motorsport	147	BMW					**68**^{3}		12

Notes

- **^3** – At the 12H Zandvoort there were only three A3T class entries. They were put in the A5 class due to the low amount of entries and therefore the A3T class was a class within the A5 class itself. At the last two rounds of the season the CUP1 class entries were put in the A5 class due to a low amount of entries and therefore the CUP1 class was also a class within the A5 class itself. In cases where A3T class entries at Zandvoort or CUP1 class entries at the last two races finished in front of an A5 class entry, it is denoted by this ^{"3"}. If an A3T class or CUP1 class entry finished in front of an A5 class entry, the A5 class entry would not receive more points. For example: the A3T class No. 205 Team Altran entry won in the A5 class at Zandvoort and the A5 class No. 75 Hofor-Kuepper Racing entry finished 2nd, but the No. 75 Hofor-Kuepper Racing entry was awarded points for 2nd position, despite being the highest classified A5 class entry. This also applies to the D2 class.

==== A3T ====
At the 12H Zandvoort there were only three A3T class entries. They were put in the A5 class due to the low amount of entries and therefore the A3T class was a class within the A5 class itself. The position in the A5 class decided the number of points awarded, not the position in the A3T class.

Pos.	Team	No.	Manufacturer	DUB (United Arab Emirates)	MUG (Italy)	ZAN (Netherlands)	LEC (France)	CAT (Spain)	BRN (Czech Republic)	Total
1	(Lebanon) Memac Ogilvy Duel Racing	95	SEAT	**27**	18		16	**13**	**15**	120
2	(France) Team Altran 1	208	Peugeot		38	**22**	14	18	18	92
3	(Netherlands) NKPP Racing	98	SEAT		13		15	19	17	84
4	(France) Team Altran 2	205	Peugeot		63	20	21	55	14	59
5	(Netherlands) Red Camel-Jordans.nl 2	101	SEAT				22	43	23	42

==== CUP1 ====
At the last two rounds of the season the CUP1 class entries were put in the A5 class due to a low amount of entries and therefore the CUP1 class was a class within the A5 class itself. The position in the A5 class decided the number of points awarded, not the position in the CUP1 class.

Pos.	Team	No.	DUB (United Arab Emirates)	MUG (Italy)	ZAN (Netherlands)	LEC (France)	CAT (Spain)	BRN (Czech Republic)	Total
1	(Germany) Bonk Motorsport	76	23						113
1	(Germany) Bonk Motorsport	73		**29**	**18**				113
1	(Germany) Bonk Motorsport	79				26			113
1	(Germany) Bonk Motorsport	72						**25**	113
2	(Germany) Securtal Sorg Rennsport 2	71	35	30			**64**	(27)	108 (122)
2	(Germany) Securtal Sorg Rennsport 2	69			24				108 (122)
2	(Germany) Securtal Sorg Rennsport 2	67				25			108 (122)
3	(Austria) MISSION POSSIBLE RACING	70	49	42	26	**34**			72
4	(Luxembourg) DUWO Racing	79			30		32		41
5	(Germany) Race-House Motorsport 2	73	37						24

==== A2/D1 ====
Creventic decided after the season ended to split the diesel-powered cars from the gasoline-powered cars creating the D1 class. Although they are separate classes, if for example the highest classified D1 class entry finishes one position in front of the highest classified A2 class entry, the A2 class entry will not receive points for 1st position. This applies to all rounds of the season with the exception of the 24H Barcelona.

Pos.	Team	No.	Manufacturer	DUB (United Arab Emirates)	MUG (Italy)	ZAN (Netherlands)	LEC (France)	CAT (Spain)	BRN (Czech Republic)	Total
A2
1	(Switzerland) presenza.eu Racing Team Clio 1	112	Renault	43	(40)	25	28	39	33	106 (120)
2	(Denmark) Team Sally Racing	126	Renault	44	33	41	31	38		84
3	(United Kingdom) RKC/TGM	99	Honda		50	28	53	33	46	71
4	(Denmark) Team K-Rejser	115	Peugeot	80	**28**	**32**	44	**48**		55
5	(Belgium) VDS Racing Adventures	117	Honda	25		29				46
D1
1	(Hungary) RCM Motorsport	139	SEAT			**37**		**59**		39
2	(Lithuania) KAUKAS	137	Volkswagen					29		30
3	(United Kingdom) KPM Racing 2	138	Volkswagen	51	31					24
3	(Switzerland) TTC-Racing	141	Volkswagen					65		24
4	(Netherlands) Red Camel-Jordans.nl 2	135	SEAT	**70**	**48**	40				20
5	(United Arab Emirates) SVDP Racing	140	BMW				**37**			18

==== Overall ====
Pos.	Team	No.	Manufacturer	Class	DUB (United Arab Emirates)	MUG (Italy)	ZAN (Netherlands)	LEC (France)	CAT (Spain)	BRN (Czech Republic)	Total
1	(Lebanon) Memac Ogilvy Duel Racing	95	SEAT	A3T	**27**	18		16	**13**	**15**	120
2	(Germany) Hofor-Kuepper Racing	75	BMW	A5	34	(43)	21	**43**	44	21	117 (135)
2	(United Kingdom) Ram Racing	30	Mercedes-Benz	A6	2	(2)	2	**1**	3	2	117 (135)
3	(Germany) Bonk Motorsport	76	BMW	CUP1	23						113
3	(Germany) Bonk Motorsport	73	BMW	CUP1		**29**	**18**				113
3	(Germany) Bonk Motorsport	79	BMW	CUP1				26			113
3	(Germany) Bonk Motorsport	72	BMW	CUP1						**25**	113
4	MARC Cars Australia 1	91	MARC Cars/Ford	SP2	33	14	12	(40)	20	13	110 (122)
5	MARC Cars Australia 2	92	MARC Cars/Ford	SP2	46	34	19	8	(53)	11	109 (118)

== See also ==
- 24H Series
