= Patrick Kelly (racing driver) =

American racing driver (born 1967)

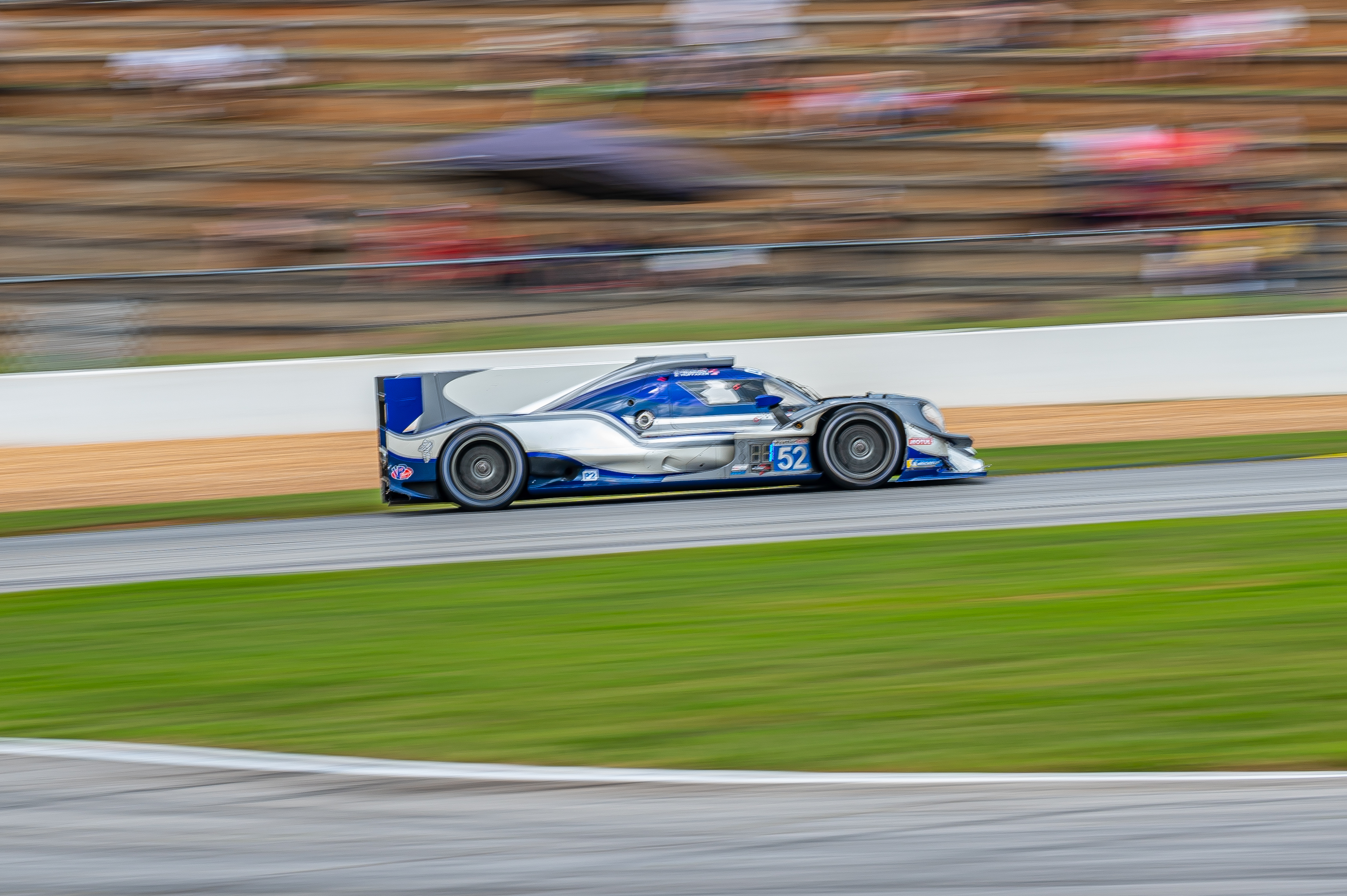
- Kelly in 2020
- Nationality: (United States) American
- Born: September 4, 1967 (age 59) Hennepin, Minnesota, U.S.
- Categorisation: FIA Bronze

Championship titles
- 2020: IMSA SportsCar Championship – LMP2

Awards
- 2020: Jim Trueman Award

Patrick Kelly (born September 4, 1967) is an American video game designer and racing driver who last competed in the LMP2 class of the IMSA SportsCar Championship for PR1/Mathiasen Motorsports. He was crowned champion in 2020, having notably recovered from a brain injury which sidelined him for nine years.

== Game development career ==
Alongside his racing career, Kelly works as Activision's head of creative design for the Call of Duty franchise, as well as being the co-studio head of Infinity Ward.

== Racing career ==
Kelly made his car racing debut in 2006, racing in the IMSA GT3 Cup Challenge for Kelly-Moss Racing. After finishing sixth in the overall standings in 2006 and making a one-off appearance at Indianapolis the following year, Kelly returned to Kelly-Moss Racing for his full season return in the IMSA GT3 Cup Challenge in 2008. In his second full-time season in the series, Kelly achieved his only series win in the Laguna Seca finale and eight other podiums to secure a third-place points finish in the Platinum standings.

Two years later, Kelly joined Alex Job Racing to race in the 12 Hours of Sebring, in which he finished third in the GTC class, driving a Porsche 997 GT3 Cup. That became his only race of the year, as just after purchasing an Oreca FLM09 for a possible step-up to the LMPC class, Kelly was involved in a traffic accident, which left him with multiple fractures and a brain injury.

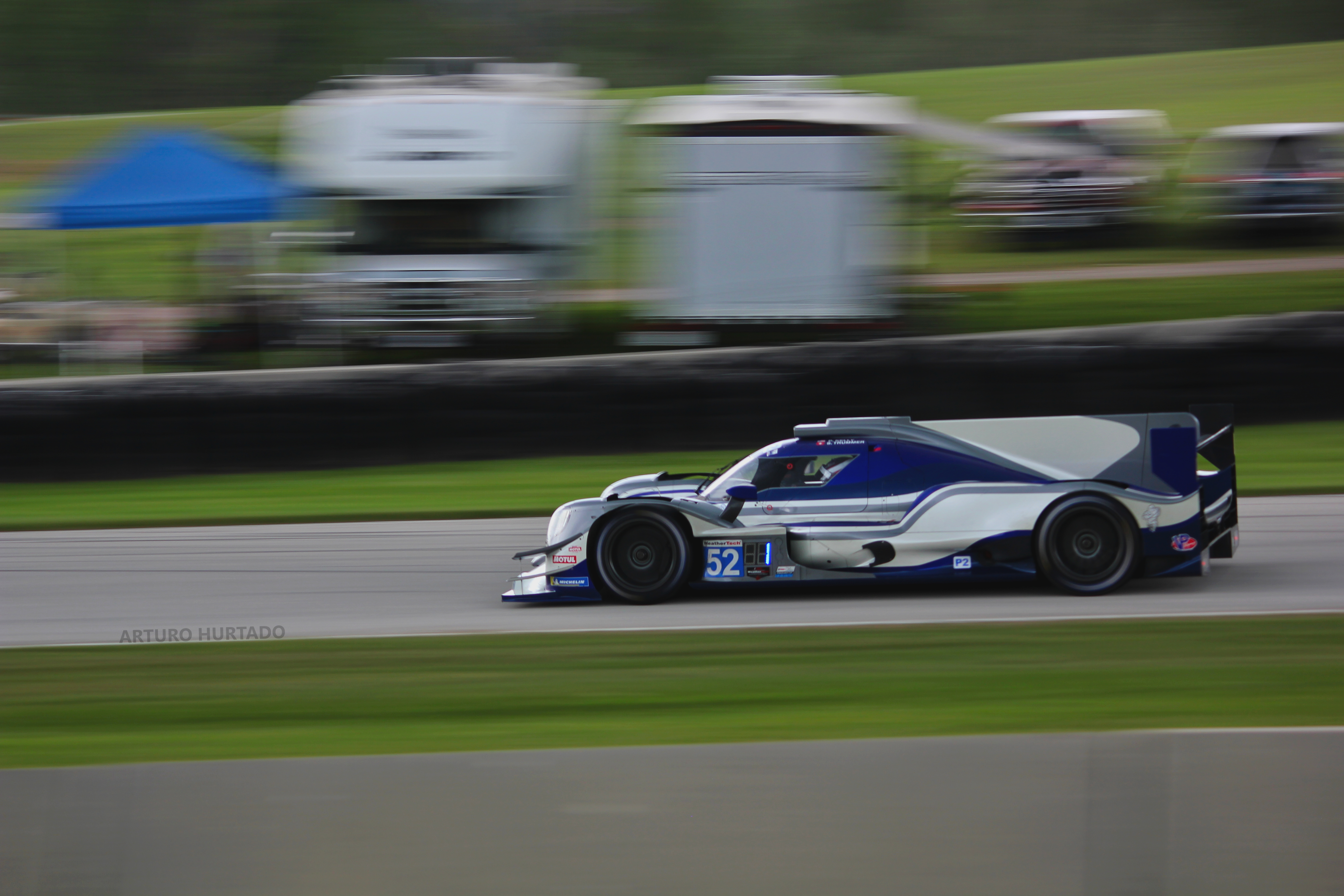
Kelly's PR1/Mathiasen Oreca 07 at Road America in 2020.

Kelly returned to action some nine years later, joining PR1/Mathiasen Motorsports to compete in the 2019 Road Race Showcase at Road America, and won on his LMP2 debut alongside Matt McMurry. In 2020, Kelly re-signed with PR1/Mathiasen to race in the LMP2 class of the IMSA SportsCar Championship from the Sebring sprint onwards, which he won alongside Spencer Pigot. Kelly then took a clean sweep of poles and further wins at Road Atlanta, Laguna Seca and the 12 Hours of Sebring to secure the LMP2 title, the Jim Trueman award and an invitation to the following year's 24 Hours of Le Mans.

Remaining with PR1/Mathiasen as they joined forces with Tech 1 Racing, Kelly was partnered with Gabriel Aubry and Simon Trummer for a part-time FIA World Endurance Championship effort in 2021. The trio came sixth in the 6 Hours of Spa-Francorchamps and retired from the 24 Hours of Le Mans with an electric issue, but did not score points as the car was not a full-season entry. The following year, Kelly returned to PR1/Mathiasen for the sprint rounds of the IMSA SportsCar Championship, in which he scored a best result of fourth at Laguna Seca and qualified on pole at Mid-Ohio.

== Karting record ==
=== Karting career summary ===
Season	Series	Team	Position
2009	SKUSA NorCal Pro Kart Challenge — S1		7th

== Racing record ==
=== Racing career summary ===
Season	Series	Team	Races	Wins	Poles	F/Laps	Podiums	Points	Position
2006	IMSA GT3 Cup Challenge	Kelly-Moss Racing	7	0	0	0	0	55	6th
2007	IMSA GT3 Cup Challenge	Kelly-Moss Racing	2	0	0	0	0	26	16th
2008	IMSA GT3 Cup Challenge – Platinum	Kelly-Moss Racing	12	1	0	2	9	188	**3rd**
2010	American Le Mans Series – GTC	Car Amigo Alex Job Racing	1	0	0	0	1	23	21st
2019	IMSA SportsCar Championship – LMP2	PR1/Mathiasen Motorsports	1	1	0	0	1	35	9th
2020	IMSA SportsCar Championship – LMP2	PR1/Mathiasen Motorsports	6	4	6	0	4	196	**1st**
2021	FIA World Endurance Championship – LMP2 Pro-Am	PR1/Mathiasen Motorsports	2	0	0	0	0	0	NC†
2021	24 Hours of Le Mans – LMP2 Pro-Am	PR1/Mathiasen Motorsports	1	0	0	0	0	—N/a	DNF
2022	IMSA SportsCar Championship – LMP2	PR1/Mathiasen Motorsports	3	0	1	0	0	889	14th

^{†} As Kelly was a guest driver, he was ineligible to score points.

=== Complete American Le Mans Series results ===
(key) (Races in bold indicate pole position)

Year	Team	Class	Make	Engine	1	2	3	4	5	6	7	8	9	Rank	Points	Ref
2010	Car Amigo Alex Job Racing	GTC	Porsche 997 GT3 Cup	Porsche 3.8 L Flat-6	SEB; 3	LBH	LAG	UTA	LRP	MDO	ELK	MOS	PET	21st	23	

=== Complete IMSA SportsCar Championship results ===
(key) (Races in bold indicate pole position; races in italics indicate fastest lap)

Year	Entrant	Class	Make	Engine	1	2	3	4	5	6	7	8	Rank	Points	Ref
2019	PR1/Mathiasen Motorsports	LMP2	Oreca 07	Gibson GK428 4.2 L V8	DAY	SEB	MDO	WGL	MOS	ELK; 1	LGA	PET	9th	35	
2020	PR1/Mathiasen Motorsports	LMP2	Oreca 07	Gibson GK428 4.2 L V8	DAY	**SEB**; 1	**ELK**; 4	**ATL**; 1	**PET**; 4	**LGA**; 1	**SEB**; 1		1st	196	
2022	PR1/Mathiasen Motorsports	LMP2	Oreca 07	Gibson GK428 4.2 L V8	DAY	SEB	LGA; 4	**MOH**; 6	WGL	ELK; 5	PET		14th	889	

=== Complete FIA World Endurance Championship results ===
(key) (Races in bold indicate pole position) (Races in italics indicate fastest lap)

Year	Entrant	Class	Car	Engine	1	2	3	4	5	6	Rank	Points
2021	PR1 Motorsports	LMP2	Oreca 07	Gibson GK428 4.2 L V8	SPA; 6	ALG	MNZ	LMS; Ret	BHR	BHR	NC†	0†

^{†} As Kelly was a guest driver, he was ineligible to score points.

=== Complete 24 Hours of Le Mans results ===
Year	Team	Co-Drivers	Car	Class	Laps	Pos.	Class Pos.
2021	(United States) PR1 Motorsports	(France) Gabriel Aubry (Switzerland) Simon Trummer	Oreca 07-Gibson	LMP2 Pro-Am	261	DNF	DNF
