= 2020 IMSA SportsCar Championship =

50th season of the racing series organized by IMSA

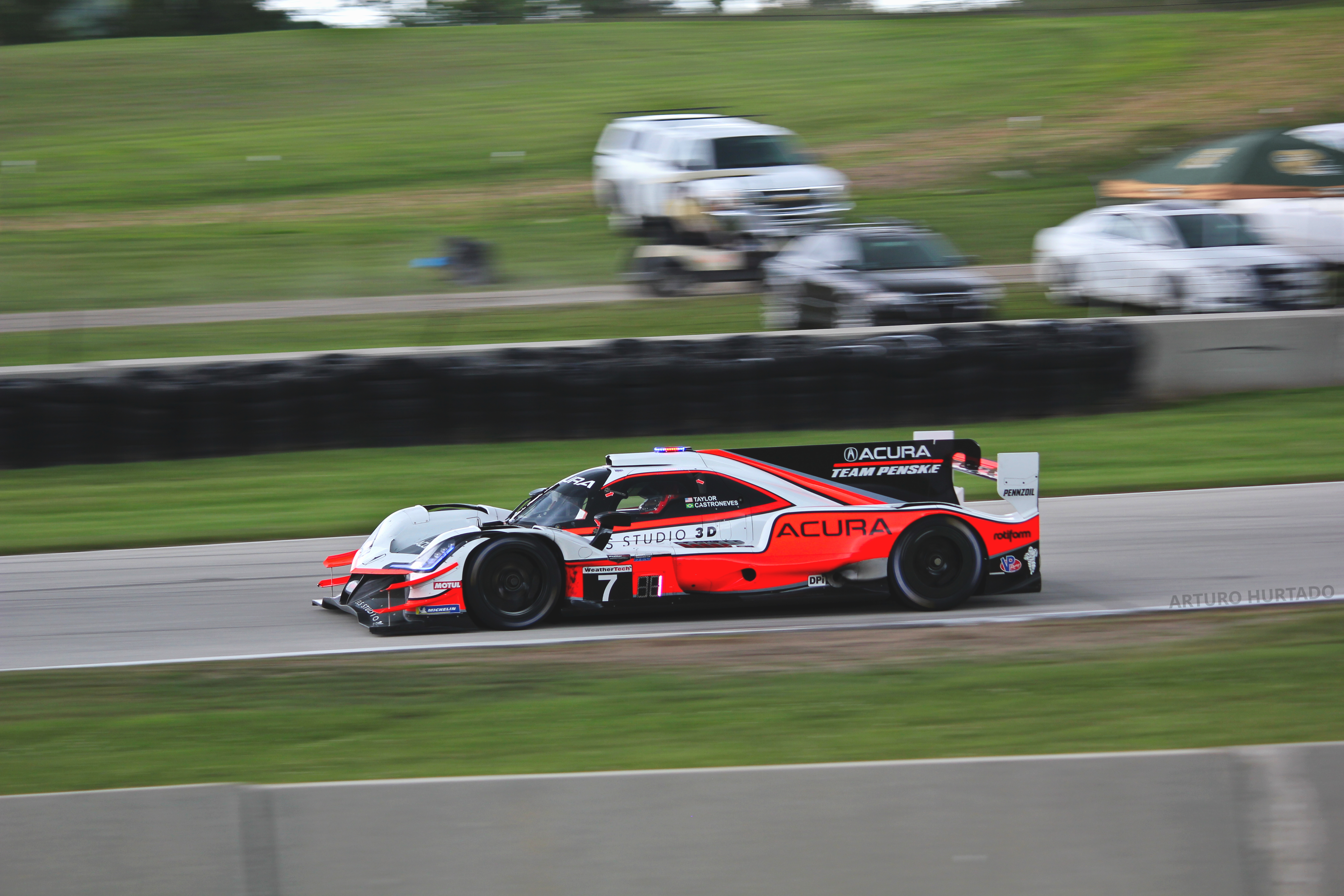
Acura Team Penske won the Daytona Prototype international championships with the No. 7 team, drivers Ricky Taylor and Hélio Castroneves.

The 2020 IMSA SportsCar Championship (known for sponsorship reasons as the 2020 IMSA WeatherTech SportsCar Championship) was the 50th racing season sanctioned by the International Motor Sports Association (IMSA) (which traces its lineage back to the 1971 IMSA GT Championship). This was also the seventh United SportsCar Championship season and fifth under the name as the IMSA SportsCar Championship. The series began on January 25 with the 24 Hours of Daytona, and ended on November 14 with the 12 Hours of Sebring.

== Series news ==
- On September 19, 2019, Scott Atherton announced he'd be retiring from his position as President of the International Motor Sports Association at the end of the 2019 season. On October 15, IMSA would confirm then-team principal of Mazda Team Joest, John Doonan, to be Atherton's replacement.
- On November 1, 2019, IMSA announced a series of changes to the WeatherTech SportsCar Championship Sporting Regulations, effective for the 2020 season. The changes announced included the addition of a "premium" package for GT Daytona (GTD) teams participating in the full season, as well as a requirement of Bronze-rated drivers in the Le Mans Prototype (LMP2) class, among other changes.

== Classes ==
- Daytona Prototype international (DPi)
- Le Mans Prototype 2 (LMP2)
- GT Le Mans (GTLM)
- GT Daytona (GTD)

=== Rule changes ===
Changes were made to the amount of practice time for amateur drivers in the LMP2 and GTD classes. Each class will have a longer dedicated free practice session for Bronze and Silver-rated drivers, set at 30 minutes long. All teams participating in such practice will also receive extra sets of tires provided by the series' tire supplier, Michelin. In addition, each LMP2 team may enter one Platinum driver at Daytona, because of the length of that round. Platinum drivers are prohibited in all other LMP2 events.

== Schedule ==
The schedule was re-released on August 1, 2020 and featured 11 rounds.

Race is part of the Michelin Endurance Cup
Race is part of the WeatherTech Sprint Cup

Rnd.	Race	Length	Classes	Circuit	Location	Date
1	Rolex 24 at Daytona	24 hours	All (Note: The LMP2 class only scored points towards the Michelin Endurance Cup.)	Daytona International Speedway	Daytona Beach, Florida	January 25–26
2	WeatherTech 240	2 hours 40 minutes	DPi, GTLM, GTD	Daytona International Speedway	Daytona Beach, Florida	July 4
3	Cadillac Grand Prix of Sebring	2 hours 40 minutes	All (Note: The GTD class only scored points towards the WeatherTech Sprint Cup.)	Sebring International Raceway	Sebring, Florida	July 18
4	Road Race Showcase at Road America	2 hours 40 minutes	All	Road America	Elkhart Lake, Wisconsin	August 2
5	Michelin GT Challenge at VIR	2 hours 40 minutes	GTLM, GTD	Virginia International Raceway	Alton, Virginia	August 22
6	TireRack.com Grand Prix at Road Atlanta	6 hours	All	Michelin Raceway Road Atlanta	Braselton, Georgia	September 5
7	Acura Sports Car Challenge at Mid-Ohio	2 hours 40 minutes	DPi, GTLM, GTD	Mid-Ohio Sports Car Course	Lexington, Ohio	September 27
8	MOTUL 100% Synthetic Grand Prix	1 hours 40 minutes	GTLM, GTD	Charlotte Motor Speedway	Concord, North Carolina	October 9
9	Motul Petit Le Mans	10 hours	All	Michelin Raceway Road Atlanta	Braselton, Georgia	October 17
10	Hyundai Monterey Sports Car Championship	2 hours 40 minutes	All	WeatherTech Raceway Laguna Seca	Monterey, California	November 1
11	Mobil 1 Twelve Hours of Sebring	12 hours	All	Sebring International Raceway	Sebring, Florida	November 14

=== COVID-19 pandemic schedule changes ===
Originally announced on August 2, 2019, the IMSA schedule was revised as a result of the coronavirus pandemic with changes announced May 15, June 25, and August 1. At the time the 12 Hours of Sebring (March 21) postponement was announced March 12 because of the pandemic and the travel ban, the Long Beach (April 18), Detroit (May 30), and Mosport (July 5) races were officially cancelled by authorities and removed from the first revision on May 15. At that point, standard-distance races were added to Daytona (July 4) and Sebring (July 11). Mid-Ohio was moved from May 3 to September 27. The 6 Hours of Watkins Glen, originally scheduled June 28, was moved to October 4 in the first revision. Lime Rock (GTLM/GTD) was moved from July 18 to October 31. The Virginia International Raceway date was moved from Sunday to Saturday (August 22) in order to avoid a date clash with the 104th Indianapolis 500.

On June 25, IMSA announced further changes. Watkins Glen and Lime Rock were moved up to consecutive weekends, September 6 and 12, while WeatherTech Raceway Laguna Seca, which had been on September 6, was moved to October 31.

However on August 1, IMSA removed the 6 Hours of The Glen and the Lime Rock round because of government regulations related to the New York and Connecticut quarantining restrictions. As a result, the 6 Hours of The Glen was replaced with a second race at Michelin Raceway Road Atlanta, and the round on the road course of Charlotte Motor Speedway came into place of the Lime Rock event in October.

== Entries ==
=== Daytona Prototype international (DPi) ===
Team	Chassis	Engine	No.	Drivers	Rounds
(United States) Mustang Sampling Racing/JDC-Miller MotorSports	Cadillac DPi-V.R	Cadillac LT4 5.5 L V8	5	(France) Sébastien Bourdais	All
(United States) Mustang Sampling Racing/JDC-Miller MotorSports	Cadillac DPi-V.R	Cadillac LT4 5.5 L V8	5	(Portugal) João Barbosa	1–4, 6–7
(United States) Mustang Sampling Racing/JDC-Miller MotorSports	Cadillac DPi-V.R	Cadillac LT4 5.5 L V8	5	(France) Loïc Duval	1, 9, 11
(United States) Mustang Sampling Racing/JDC-Miller MotorSports	Cadillac DPi-V.R	Cadillac LT4 5.5 L V8	5	(France) Tristan Vautier	6, 9–11
(United States) JDC-Miller MotorSports	Cadillac DPi-V.R	Cadillac LT4 5.5 L V8	85	(France) Tristan Vautier	1–4, 7
(United States) JDC-Miller MotorSports	Cadillac DPi-V.R	Cadillac LT4 5.5 L V8	85	(United States) Chris Miller	1–2, 4, 9
(United States) JDC-Miller MotorSports	Cadillac DPi-V.R	Cadillac LT4 5.5 L V8	85	(Brazil) Matheus Leist	1, 6, 9–11
(United States) JDC-Miller MotorSports	Cadillac DPi-V.R	Cadillac LT4 5.5 L V8	85	(Colombia) Juan Piedrahita	1
(United States) JDC-Miller MotorSports	Cadillac DPi-V.R	Cadillac LT4 5.5 L V8	85	(South Africa) Stephen Simpson	3, 6, 10–11
(United States) JDC-Miller MotorSports	Cadillac DPi-V.R	Cadillac LT4 5.5 L V8	85	(France) Gabriel Aubry	7, 9
(United States) JDC-Miller MotorSports	Cadillac DPi-V.R	Cadillac LT4 5.5 L V8	85	(Australia) Scott Andrews	11
(United States) Acura Team Penske	Acura ARX-05	Acura AR35TT 3.5 L Turbo V6	6	(United States) Dane Cameron	All
(United States) Acura Team Penske	Acura ARX-05	Acura AR35TT 3.5 L Turbo V6	6	(Colombia) Juan Pablo Montoya	All
(United States) Acura Team Penske	Acura ARX-05	Acura AR35TT 3.5 L Turbo V6	6	(France) Simon Pagenaud	1, 9, 11
(United States) Acura Team Penske	Acura ARX-05	Acura AR35TT 3.5 L Turbo V6	7	(Brazil) Hélio Castroneves	All
(United States) Acura Team Penske	Acura ARX-05	Acura AR35TT 3.5 L Turbo V6	7	(United States) Ricky Taylor	All
(United States) Acura Team Penske	Acura ARX-05	Acura AR35TT 3.5 L Turbo V6	7	(United States) Alexander Rossi	1, 9, 11
(United States) Konica Minolta Cadillac DPi-V.R	Cadillac DPi-V.R	Cadillac LT4 5.5 L V8	10	(Netherlands) Renger van der Zande	All
(United States) Konica Minolta Cadillac DPi-V.R	Cadillac DPi-V.R	Cadillac LT4 5.5 L V8	10	(Australia) Ryan Briscoe	All
(United States) Konica Minolta Cadillac DPi-V.R	Cadillac DPi-V.R	Cadillac LT4 5.5 L V8	10	(New Zealand) Scott Dixon	1, 9, 11
(United States) Konica Minolta Cadillac DPi-V.R	Cadillac DPi-V.R	Cadillac LT4 5.5 L V8	10	(Japan) Kamui Kobayashi	1
(United States) Whelen Engineering Racing	Cadillac DPi-V.R	Cadillac LT4 5.5 L V8	31	(Brazil) Pipo Derani	All
(United States) Whelen Engineering Racing	Cadillac DPi-V.R	Cadillac LT4 5.5 L V8	31	(Brazil) Felipe Nasr	1, 3–4, 6–7, 9–11
(United States) Whelen Engineering Racing	Cadillac DPi-V.R	Cadillac LT4 5.5 L V8	31	(Portugal) Filipe Albuquerque	1, 6, 9
(United States) Whelen Engineering Racing	Cadillac DPi-V.R	Cadillac LT4 5.5 L V8	31	(United Kingdom) Mike Conway	1
(United States) Whelen Engineering Racing	Cadillac DPi-V.R	Cadillac LT4 5.5 L V8	31	(Colombia) Gabby Chaves	2, 11
(Germany) Mazda Team Joest (Note: The Mazdas were entered as Mazda Team Joest for the Rolex 24 at Daytona and were entered as Mazda Motorsports from the WeatherTech 240 onwards.) (Japan) Mazda Motorsports	Mazda RT24-P	Mazda MZ-2.0T 2.0 L Turbo I4	55	(United States) Jonathan Bomarito	All
(Germany) Mazda Team Joest (Japan) Mazda Motorsports	Mazda RT24-P	Mazda MZ-2.0T 2.0 L Turbo I4	55	(United Kingdom) Harry Tincknell	All
(Germany) Mazda Team Joest (Japan) Mazda Motorsports	Mazda RT24-P	Mazda MZ-2.0T 2.0 L Turbo I4	55	(United States) Ryan Hunter-Reay	1, 6, 9, 11
(Germany) Mazda Team Joest (Japan) Mazda Motorsports	Mazda RT24-P	Mazda MZ-2.0T 2.0 L Turbo I4	77	(United Kingdom) Oliver Jarvis	All
(Germany) Mazda Team Joest (Japan) Mazda Motorsports	Mazda RT24-P	Mazda MZ-2.0T 2.0 L Turbo I4	77	(United States) Tristan Nunez	All
(Germany) Mazda Team Joest (Japan) Mazda Motorsports	Mazda RT24-P	Mazda MZ-2.0T 2.0 L Turbo I4	77	(France) Olivier Pla	1, 6, 9, 11

=== Le Mans Prototype 2 (LMP2) ===
In accordance with the 2017 LMP2 regulations, all cars in the LMP2 class use the Gibson GK428 V8 engine.

Team	Chassis	No.	Drivers	Rounds
(United States) Tower Motorsport by Starworks	Oreca 07	8	(Canada) John Farano	1, 3, 9, 11
(United States) Tower Motorsport by Starworks	Oreca 07	8	(United Kingdom) Ryan Dalziel	1, 3
(United States) Tower Motorsport by Starworks	Oreca 07	8	(Denmark) David Heinemeier Hansson	1, 11
(United States) Tower Motorsport by Starworks	Oreca 07	8	(France) Nicolas Lapierre	1
(United States) Tower Motorsport by Starworks	Oreca 07	8	(Denmark) Mikkel Jensen	9, 11
(United States) Tower Motorsport by Starworks	Oreca 07	8	(Netherlands) Job van Uitert	9
(United States) Era Motorsport	Oreca 07	18	(United States) Dwight Merriman	1, 3–4, 6
(United States) Era Motorsport	Oreca 07	18	(United Kingdom) Kyle Tilley	1, 3–4, 6
(United States) Era Motorsport	Oreca 07	18	(United Kingdom) Ryan Lewis	1
(United States) Era Motorsport	Oreca 07	18	(France) Nicolas Minassian	1
(United States) Era Motorsport	Oreca 07	18	(United States) Colin Braun	6
(United States) Performance Tech Motorsports	Oreca 07	38	(Canada) Cameron Cassels	1, 3–4
(United States) Performance Tech Motorsports	Oreca 07	38	(United States) Kyle Masson	1, 3
(United States) Performance Tech Motorsports	Oreca 07	38	(United States) Don Yount	1, 11
(United States) Performance Tech Motorsports	Oreca 07	38	(United States) Robert Masson	1
(United States) Performance Tech Motorsports	Oreca 07	38	(United States) James French	4
(United States) Performance Tech Motorsports	Oreca 07	38	(United Kingdom) Matthew Bell	9
(United States) Performance Tech Motorsports	Oreca 07	38	(United States) Colin Braun	9
(United States) Performance Tech Motorsports	Oreca 07	38	(United States) James McGuire	9
(United States) Performance Tech Motorsports	Oreca 07	38	(United States) Patrick Byrne	11
(United States) Performance Tech Motorsports	Oreca 07	38	(United States) Guy Cosmo	11
(Poland) Inter Europol Competition	Oreca 07	51	(Poland) Jakub Śmiechowski	9, 11
(Poland) Inter Europol Competition	Oreca 07	51	(United States) Rob Hodes	9
(Poland) Inter Europol Competition	Oreca 07	51	(United States) Austin McCusker	9
(Poland) Inter Europol Competition	Oreca 07	51	(United Kingdom) Matthew Bell	11
(Poland) Inter Europol Competition	Oreca 07	51	(United States) Naveen Rao	11
(United States) PR1/Mathiasen Motorsports	Oreca 07	52	(Switzerland) Simon Trummer	1, 4, 6, 9–11
(United States) PR1/Mathiasen Motorsports	Oreca 07	52	(United States) Patrick Kelly	3–4, 6, 9–11
(United States) PR1/Mathiasen Motorsports	Oreca 07	52	(France) Gabriel Aubry	1
(United States) PR1/Mathiasen Motorsports	Oreca 07	52	(United States) Nicholas Boulle	1
(United States) PR1/Mathiasen Motorsports	Oreca 07	52	(United States) Ben Keating	1
(United States) PR1/Mathiasen Motorsports	Oreca 07	52	(United States) Spencer Pigot	3
(United States) PR1/Mathiasen Motorsports	Oreca 07	52	(United States) Scott Huffaker	6, 9, 11
(United States) DragonSpeed USA	Oreca 07	81	(Sweden) Henrik Hedman	1, 3–4
(United States) DragonSpeed USA	Oreca 07	81	(United Kingdom) Ben Hanley	1, 4
(United States) DragonSpeed USA	Oreca 07	81	(United States) Colin Braun	1
(United States) DragonSpeed USA	Oreca 07	81	(United Kingdom) Harrison Newey	1
(United States) DragonSpeed USA	Oreca 07	81	(United States) Gustavo Menezes	3

=== GT Le Mans (GTLM) ===
Team	Chassis	Engine	No.	Drivers	Rounds
(United States) Corvette Racing	Chevrolet Corvette C8.R	Chevrolet LT6.R 5.5 L V8	3	(Spain) Antonio García	All
(United States) Corvette Racing	Chevrolet Corvette C8.R	Chevrolet LT6.R 5.5 L V8	3	(United States) Jordan Taylor	All
(United States) Corvette Racing	Chevrolet Corvette C8.R	Chevrolet LT6.R 5.5 L V8	3	(Netherlands) Nick Catsburg	1, 9, 11
(United States) Corvette Racing	Chevrolet Corvette C8.R	Chevrolet LT6.R 5.5 L V8	4	(United Kingdom) Oliver Gavin	All
(United States) Corvette Racing	Chevrolet Corvette C8.R	Chevrolet LT6.R 5.5 L V8	4	(United States) Tommy Milner	All
(United States) Corvette Racing	Chevrolet Corvette C8.R	Chevrolet LT6.R 5.5 L V8	4	(Switzerland) Marcel Fässler	1, 9, 11
(United States) BMW Team RLL	BMW M8 GTE	BMW S63 4.0 L Turbo V8	24	(United States) John Edwards	All
(United States) BMW Team RLL	BMW M8 GTE	BMW S63 4.0 L Turbo V8	24	(Finland) Jesse Krohn	All
(United States) BMW Team RLL	BMW M8 GTE	BMW S63 4.0 L Turbo V8	24	(Brazil) Augusto Farfus	1, 9, 11
(United States) BMW Team RLL	BMW M8 GTE	BMW S63 4.0 L Turbo V8	24	(Australia) Chaz Mostert	1
(United States) BMW Team RLL	BMW M8 GTE	BMW S63 4.0 L Turbo V8	25	(United States) Connor De Phillippi	All
(United States) BMW Team RLL	BMW M8 GTE	BMW S63 4.0 L Turbo V8	25	(Canada) Bruno Spengler	All
(United States) BMW Team RLL	BMW M8 GTE	BMW S63 4.0 L Turbo V8	25	(United States) Colton Herta	1, 9, 11
(United States) BMW Team RLL	BMW M8 GTE	BMW S63 4.0 L Turbo V8	25	(Austria) Philipp Eng	1
(United States) Risi Competizione	Ferrari 488 GTE Evo	Ferrari F154CB 4.0 L Turbo V8	62	(United Kingdom) James Calado	1
(United States) Risi Competizione	Ferrari 488 GTE Evo	Ferrari F154CB 4.0 L Turbo V8	62	(Italy) Alessandro Pier Guidi	1
(United States) Risi Competizione	Ferrari 488 GTE Evo	Ferrari F154CB 4.0 L Turbo V8	62	(Italy) Davide Rigon	1
(United States) Risi Competizione	Ferrari 488 GTE Evo	Ferrari F154CB 4.0 L Turbo V8	62	(Brazil) Daniel Serra	1
(United States) Porsche GT Team	Porsche 911 RSR-19	Porsche M97/80 4.2 L Flat-6	911	(France) Frédéric Makowiecki	1–6, 8–11
(United States) Porsche GT Team	Porsche 911 RSR-19	Porsche M97/80 4.2 L Flat-6	911	(United Kingdom) Nick Tandy	1–6, 8–11
(United States) Porsche GT Team	Porsche 911 RSR-19	Porsche M97/80 4.2 L Flat-6	911	(Australia) Matt Campbell	1, 9
(United States) Porsche GT Team	Porsche 911 RSR-19	Porsche M97/80 4.2 L Flat-6	911	(New Zealand) Earl Bamber	11
(United States) Porsche GT Team	Porsche 911 RSR-19	Porsche M97/80 4.2 L Flat-6	912	(New Zealand) Earl Bamber	1–6, 8–11
(United States) Porsche GT Team	Porsche 911 RSR-19	Porsche M97/80 4.2 L Flat-6	912	(Belgium) Laurens Vanthoor	1–6, 8–11
(United States) Porsche GT Team	Porsche 911 RSR-19	Porsche M97/80 4.2 L Flat-6	912	(France) Mathieu Jaminet	1, 9
(United States) Porsche GT Team	Porsche 911 RSR-19	Porsche M97/80 4.2 L Flat-6	912	(Switzerland) Neel Jani	11

=== GT Daytona (GTD) ===
Team	Chassis	Engine	No.	Drivers	Rounds
(Canada) Pfaff Motorsports	Porsche 911 GT3 R	Porsche 4.0 L Flat-6	9	(Germany) Lars Kern	1, 9
(Canada) Pfaff Motorsports	Porsche 911 GT3 R	Porsche 4.0 L Flat-6	9	(Norway) Dennis Olsen	1, 9
(Canada) Pfaff Motorsports	Porsche 911 GT3 R	Porsche 4.0 L Flat-6	9	(Canada) Zacharie Robichon	1, 9
(Canada) Pfaff Motorsports	Porsche 911 GT3 R	Porsche 4.0 L Flat-6	9	(France) Patrick Pilet	1
(Austria) GRT Grasser Racing Team	Lamborghini Huracán GT3 Evo	Lamborghini DGF 5.2 L V10	11	(United States) Richard Heistand	1, 6, 11
(Austria) GRT Grasser Racing Team	Lamborghini Huracán GT3 Evo	Lamborghini DGF 5.2 L V10	11	(Netherlands) Steijn Schothorst	1, 6, 11
(Austria) GRT Grasser Racing Team	Lamborghini Huracán GT3 Evo	Lamborghini DGF 5.2 L V10	11	(Spain) Albert Costa	1
(Austria) GRT Grasser Racing Team	Lamborghini Huracán GT3 Evo	Lamborghini DGF 5.2 L V10	11	(France) Franck Perera	1, 11
(Austria) GRT Grasser Racing Team	Lamborghini Huracán GT3 Evo	Lamborghini DGF 5.2 L V10	11	(United Kingdom) Richard Westbrook	6
(Denmark) GEAR Racing powered by GRT Grasser	Lamborghini Huracán GT3 Evo	Lamborghini DGF 5.2 L V10	19	(Colombia) Tatiana Calderón	1
(Denmark) GEAR Racing powered by GRT Grasser	Lamborghini Huracán GT3 Evo	Lamborghini DGF 5.2 L V10	19	(Switzerland) Rahel Frey	1
(Denmark) GEAR Racing powered by GRT Grasser	Lamborghini Huracán GT3 Evo	Lamborghini DGF 5.2 L V10	19	(United Kingdom) Katherine Legge	1
(Denmark) GEAR Racing powered by GRT Grasser	Lamborghini Huracán GT3 Evo	Lamborghini DGF 5.2 L V10	19	(Denmark) Christina Nielsen	1
(United States) GRT Magnus	Lamborghini Huracán GT3 Evo	Lamborghini DGF 5.2 L V10	44	(United States) Andy Lally	All
(United States) GRT Magnus	Lamborghini Huracán GT3 Evo	Lamborghini DGF 5.2 L V10	44	(United States) John Potter	All
(United States) GRT Magnus	Lamborghini Huracán GT3 Evo	Lamborghini DGF 5.2 L V10	44	(United States) Spencer Pumpelly	1, 6, 9, 11
(United States) GRT Magnus	Lamborghini Huracán GT3 Evo	Lamborghini DGF 5.2 L V10	44	(Italy) Marco Mapelli	1
(Canada) AIM Vasser Sullivan	Lexus RC F GT3	Toyota 2UR-GSE 5.4 L V8	12	(United States) Townsend Bell	All
(Canada) AIM Vasser Sullivan	Lexus RC F GT3	Toyota 2UR-GSE 5.4 L V8	12	(United States) Frankie Montecalvo	1–7, 9–11
(Canada) AIM Vasser Sullivan	Lexus RC F GT3	Toyota 2UR-GSE 5.4 L V8	12	(United States) Aaron Telitz	1, 6
(Canada) AIM Vasser Sullivan	Lexus RC F GT3	Toyota 2UR-GSE 5.4 L V8	12	(New Zealand) Shane van Gisbergen	1
(Canada) AIM Vasser Sullivan	Lexus RC F GT3	Toyota 2UR-GSE 5.4 L V8	12	(United States) Michael de Quesada	8, 11
(Canada) AIM Vasser Sullivan	Lexus RC F GT3	Toyota 2UR-GSE 5.4 L V8	12	(United States) Kyle Kirkwood	9
(Canada) AIM Vasser Sullivan	Lexus RC F GT3	Toyota 2UR-GSE 5.4 L V8	14	(United Kingdom) Jack Hawksworth	All
(Canada) AIM Vasser Sullivan	Lexus RC F GT3	Toyota 2UR-GSE 5.4 L V8	14	(United States) Aaron Telitz	2–5, 7–11
(Canada) AIM Vasser Sullivan	Lexus RC F GT3	Toyota 2UR-GSE 5.4 L V8	14	(United States) Michael de Quesada	1, 6, 9
(Canada) AIM Vasser Sullivan	Lexus RC F GT3	Toyota 2UR-GSE 5.4 L V8	14	(United States) Kyle Busch	1
(Canada) AIM Vasser Sullivan	Lexus RC F GT3	Toyota 2UR-GSE 5.4 L V8	14	(United States) Parker Chase	1
(Canada) AIM Vasser Sullivan	Lexus RC F GT3	Toyota 2UR-GSE 5.4 L V8	14	(Canada) Daniel Morad	6
(Canada) AIM Vasser Sullivan	Lexus RC F GT3	Toyota 2UR-GSE 5.4 L V8	14	(United States) Kyle Kirkwood	11
(United States) Wright Motorsports	Porsche 911 GT3 R	Porsche 4.0 L Flat-6	16	(United States) Ryan Hardwick	All
(United States) Wright Motorsports	Porsche 911 GT3 R	Porsche 4.0 L Flat-6	16	(United States) Patrick Long	All
(United States) Wright Motorsports	Porsche 911 GT3 R	Porsche 4.0 L Flat-6	16	(Austria) Klaus Bachler	1
(United States) Wright Motorsports	Porsche 911 GT3 R	Porsche 4.0 L Flat-6	16	(United States) Anthony Imperato	1
(United States) Wright Motorsports	Porsche 911 GT3 R	Porsche 4.0 L Flat-6	16	(Belgium) Jan Heylen	6, 9, 11
(United States) Gradient Racing	Acura NSX GT3 Evo	Acura JNC1 3.5 L Turbo V6	22	(United Kingdom) Till Bechtolsheimer	2–5, 7–8, 10
(United States) Gradient Racing	Acura NSX GT3 Evo	Acura JNC1 3.5 L Turbo V6	22	(United States) Marc Miller	2–5, 7–8, 10
(United States) Heart of Racing Team	Aston Martin Vantage AMR GT3	Mercedes-Benz M177 4.0 L Turbo V8	23	(Canada) Roman De Angelis	1, 4–11
(United States) Heart of Racing Team	Aston Martin Vantage AMR GT3	Mercedes-Benz M177 4.0 L Turbo V8	23	(United Kingdom) Ian James	1, 4–11
(United States) Heart of Racing Team	Aston Martin Vantage AMR GT3	Mercedes-Benz M177 4.0 L Turbo V8	23	(Spain) Alex Riberas	1
(United States) Heart of Racing Team	Aston Martin Vantage AMR GT3	Mercedes-Benz M177 4.0 L Turbo V8	23	(Denmark) Nicki Thiim	1
(United States) Heart of Racing Team	Aston Martin Vantage AMR GT3	Mercedes-Benz M177 4.0 L Turbo V8	23	(United Kingdom) Darren Turner	6, 9, 11
(United States) Team Hardpoint	Audi R8 LMS Evo	Audi DAR 5.2 L V10	30	(United States) Robert Ferriol	2–5, 7–11
(United States) Team Hardpoint	Audi R8 LMS Evo	Audi DAR 5.2 L V10	30	(United States) Spencer Pumpelly	2–5, 7–8, 10
(United States) Team Hardpoint	Audi R8 LMS Evo	Audi DAR 5.2 L V10	30	(United States) Andrew Davis	9, 11
(United States) Team Hardpoint	Audi R8 LMS Evo	Audi DAR 5.2 L V10	30	(Germany) Markus Winkelhock	9
(United States) Team Hardpoint	Audi R8 LMS Evo	Audi DAR 5.2 L V10	30	(Germany) Pierre Kaffer	11
(United States) Precision Performance Motorsports	Lamborghini Huracán GT3 Evo	Lamborghini DGF 5.2 L V10	47	(United States) Brandon Gdovic	1
(United States) Precision Performance Motorsports	Lamborghini Huracán GT3 Evo	Lamborghini DGF 5.2 L V10	47	(United Kingdom) Johnathan Hoggard	1
(United States) Precision Performance Motorsports	Lamborghini Huracán GT3 Evo	Lamborghini DGF 5.2 L V10	47	(United States) Mark Kvamme	1
(United States) Precision Performance Motorsports	Lamborghini Huracán GT3 Evo	Lamborghini DGF 5.2 L V10	47	(United States) Eric Lux	1
(United States) Paul Miller Racing	Lamborghini Huracán GT3 Evo	Lamborghini DGF 5.2 L V10	48	(United States) Bryan Sellers	1, 5–6, 9, 11
(United States) Paul Miller Racing	Lamborghini Huracán GT3 Evo	Lamborghini DGF 5.2 L V10	48	(United States) Madison Snow	1, 5–6, 9, 11
(United States) Paul Miller Racing	Lamborghini Huracán GT3 Evo	Lamborghini DGF 5.2 L V10	48	(United States) Corey Lewis	1, 6, 9, 11
(United States) Paul Miller Racing	Lamborghini Huracán GT3 Evo	Lamborghini DGF 5.2 L V10	48	(Italy) Andrea Caldarelli	1
(United States) Black Swan Racing	Porsche 911 GT3 R	Porsche 4.0 L Flat-6	54	(Netherlands) Jeroen Bleekemolen	1
(United States) Black Swan Racing	Porsche 911 GT3 R	Porsche 4.0 L Flat-6	54	(United States) Trenton Estep	1
(United States) Black Swan Racing	Porsche 911 GT3 R	Porsche 4.0 L Flat-6	54	(Germany) Sven Müller	1
(United States) Black Swan Racing	Porsche 911 GT3 R	Porsche 4.0 L Flat-6	54	(United States) Tim Pappas	1
(United States) Heinricher Racing with MSR Curb-Agajanian	Acura NSX GT3 Evo	Acura JNC1 3.5 L Turbo V6	57	(Canada) Mikhail Goikhberg	1–2, 4–11
(United States) Heinricher Racing with MSR Curb-Agajanian	Acura NSX GT3 Evo	Acura JNC1 3.5 L Turbo V6	57	(Portugal) Álvaro Parente	1–2, 4–10
(United States) Heinricher Racing with MSR Curb-Agajanian	Acura NSX GT3 Evo	Acura JNC1 3.5 L Turbo V6	57	(United States) Trent Hindman	1, 6, 9, 11
(United States) Heinricher Racing with MSR Curb-Agajanian	Acura NSX GT3 Evo	Acura JNC1 3.5 L Turbo V6	57	(United States) A. J. Allmendinger	1
(United States) Heinricher Racing with MSR Curb-Agajanian	Acura NSX GT3 Evo	Acura JNC1 3.5 L Turbo V6	57	(United States) Joey Hand	11
(United States) Meyer Shank Racing with Curb-Agajanian	Acura NSX GT3 Evo	Acura JNC1 3.5 L Turbo V6	86	(Germany) Mario Farnbacher	1–2, 4–11
(United States) Meyer Shank Racing with Curb-Agajanian	Acura NSX GT3 Evo	Acura JNC1 3.5 L Turbo V6	86	(United States) Matt McMurry	1–2, 4–11
(United States) Meyer Shank Racing with Curb-Agajanian	Acura NSX GT3 Evo	Acura JNC1 3.5 L Turbo V6	86	(Japan) Shinya Michimi	1, 6, 9, 11
(United States) Meyer Shank Racing with Curb-Agajanian	Acura NSX GT3 Evo	Acura JNC1 3.5 L Turbo V6	86	(France) Jules Gounon	1
(United States) Scuderia Corsa	Ferrari 488 GT3	Ferrari F154CB 3.9 L Turbo V8	63	(United States) Cooper MacNeil	1–6, 9–11
(United States) Scuderia Corsa	Ferrari 488 GT3	Ferrari F154CB 3.9 L Turbo V8	63	(Finland) Toni Vilander	1–6
(United States) Scuderia Corsa	Ferrari 488 GT3	Ferrari F154CB 3.9 L Turbo V8	63	(United States) Jeff Westphal	1, 6, 9, 11
(United States) Scuderia Corsa	Ferrari 488 GT3	Ferrari F154CB 3.9 L Turbo V8	63	(Italy) Alessandro Balzan	1, 9–11
(United States) Riley Motorsports	Mercedes-AMG GT3 Evo	Mercedes-AMG M159 6.2 L V8	74	(United States) Lawson Aschenbach	All
(United States) Riley Motorsports	Mercedes-AMG GT3 Evo	Mercedes-AMG M159 6.2 L V8	74	(United States) Gar Robinson	All
(United States) Riley Motorsports	Mercedes-AMG GT3 Evo	Mercedes-AMG M159 6.2 L V8	74	(United States) Ben Keating	1, 6, 9
(United States) Riley Motorsports	Mercedes-AMG GT3 Evo	Mercedes-AMG M159 6.2 L V8	74	(Brazil) Felipe Fraga	1
(United States) Riley Motorsports	Mercedes-AMG GT3 Evo	Mercedes-AMG M159 6.2 L V8	74	(United States) Marc Miller	11
(United States) Compass Racing	McLaren 720S GT3	McLaren M840T 4.0 L Turbo V8	76	(United States) Paul Holton	2–5, 7–8, 10
(United States) Compass Racing	McLaren 720S GT3	McLaren M840T 4.0 L Turbo V8	76	(United States) Corey Fergus	2–5, 7
(United States) Compass Racing	McLaren 720S GT3	McLaren M840T 4.0 L Turbo V8	76	(Canada) Jeff Kingsley	8, 10
(Belgium) WRT Speedstar Audi Sport	Audi R8 LMS Evo	Audi DAR 5.2 L V10	88	(Italy) Mirko Bortolotti	1
(Belgium) WRT Speedstar Audi Sport	Audi R8 LMS Evo	Audi DAR 5.2 L V10	88	(Switzerland) Rolf Ineichen	1
(Belgium) WRT Speedstar Audi Sport	Audi R8 LMS Evo	Audi DAR 5.2 L V10	88	(Canada) Daniel Morad	1
(Belgium) WRT Speedstar Audi Sport	Audi R8 LMS Evo	Audi DAR 5.2 L V10	88	(Belgium) Dries Vanthoor	1
(United States) Turner Motorsport	BMW M6 GT3	BMW S63 4.4 L Turbo V8	96	(United States) Bill Auberlen	1-10
(United States) Turner Motorsport	BMW M6 GT3	BMW S63 4.4 L Turbo V8	96	(United States) Robby Foley	All
(United States) Turner Motorsport	BMW M6 GT3	BMW S63 4.4 L Turbo V8	96	(United States) Dillon Machavern	1, 6, 9, 11
(United States) Turner Motorsport	BMW M6 GT3	BMW S63 4.4 L Turbo V8	96	(Germany) Jens Klingmann	1
(United States) Turner Motorsport	BMW M6 GT3	BMW S63 4.4 L Turbo V8	96	(United Kingdom) Nick Yelloly	11
(United Kingdom) Aston Martin Racing	Aston Martin Vantage AMR GT3	Mercedes-Benz M177 4.0 L Turbo V8	98	(United Kingdom) Ross Gunn	1
(United Kingdom) Aston Martin Racing	Aston Martin Vantage AMR GT3	Mercedes-Benz M177 4.0 L Turbo V8	98	(Portugal) Pedro Lamy	1
(United Kingdom) Aston Martin Racing	Aston Martin Vantage AMR GT3	Mercedes-Benz M177 4.0 L Turbo V8	98	(Austria) Mathias Lauda	1
(United Kingdom) Aston Martin Racing	Aston Martin Vantage AMR GT3	Mercedes-Benz M177 4.0 L Turbo V8	98	(United Kingdom) Andrew Watson	1

== Race results ==
Bold indicates overall winner.

Rnd	Circuit	DPi Winning Team	LMP2 Winning Team	GTLM Winning Team	GTD Winning Team	Report
Rnd	Circuit	DPi Winning Drivers	LMP2 Winning Drivers	GTLM Winning Drivers	GTD Winning Drivers	Report
1	24 Hours of Daytona	**(United States) #10 Konica Minolta Cadillac DPi-V.R**	(United States) #81 DragonSpeed USA	(United States) #24 BMW Team RLL	(United States) #48 Paul Miller Racing	Report
1	24 Hours of Daytona	**(Australia) Ryan Briscoe** **(New Zealand) Scott Dixon** **(Japan) Kamui Kobayashi** **(Netherlands) Renger van der Zande**	(United States) Colin Braun (United Kingdom) Ben Hanley (Sweden) Henrik Hedman (United Kingdom) Harrison Newey	(United States) John Edwards (Brazil) Augusto Farfus (Finland) Jesse Krohn (Australia) Chaz Mostert	(Italy) Andrea Caldarelli (United States) Corey Lewis (United States) Bryan Sellers (United States) Madison Snow	Report
2	Daytona (2 Hours, 40 Minutes)	**(Japan) #55 Mazda Motorsports**	did not participate	(United States) #3 Corvette Racing	(Canada) #14 AIM Vasser Sullivan	Report
2	Daytona (2 Hours, 40 Minutes)	**(United States) Jonathan Bomarito** **(United Kingdom) Harry Tincknell**	did not participate	(Spain) Antonio García (United States) Jordan Taylor	(United Kingdom) Jack Hawksworth (United States) Aaron Telitz	Report
3	Sebring (2 Hours, 40 Minutes)	**(United States) #31 Whelen Engineering Racing**	(United States) #52 PR1/Mathiasen Motorsports	(United States) #4 Corvette Racing	(Canada) #14 AIM Vasser Sullivan	Report
3	Sebring (2 Hours, 40 Minutes)	**(Brazil) Pipo Derani** **(Brazil) Felipe Nasr**	(United States) Patrick Kelly (United States) Spencer Pigot	(United Kingdom) Oliver Gavin (United States) Tommy Milner	(United Kingdom) Jack Hawksworth (United States) Aaron Telitz	Report
4	Road America	**(United States) #7 Acura Team Penske**	(United States) #81 DragonSpeed USA	(United States) #3 Corvette Racing	(Canada) #12 AIM Vasser Sullivan	Report
4	Road America	**(Brazil) Hélio Castroneves** **(United States) Ricky Taylor**	(United Kingdom) Ben Hanley (Sweden) Henrik Hedman	(Spain) Antonio García (United States) Jordan Taylor	(United States) Townsend Bell (United States) Frankie Montecalvo	Report
5	Virginia	did not participate	did not participate	**(United States) No. 3 Corvette Racing**	(United States) No. 96 Turner Motorsport	Report
5	Virginia	did not participate	did not participate	**(Spain) Antonio García** **(United States) Jordan Taylor**	(United States) Bill Auberlen (United States) Robby Foley	Report
6	Road Atlanta (6 Hours)	**(United States) #7 Acura Team Penske**	(United States) #52 PR1/Mathiasen Motorsports	(United States) #25 BMW Team RLL	(United States) #86 Meyer Shank Racing with Curb-Agajanian	Report
6	Road Atlanta (6 Hours)	**(Brazil) Hélio Castroneves** **(United States) Ricky Taylor**	(United States) Scott Huffaker (United States) Patrick Kelly (Switzerland) Simon Trummer	(United States) Connor De Phillippi (Canada) Bruno Spengler	(Germany) Mario Farnbacher (United States) Matt McMurry (Japan) Shinya Michimi	Report
7	Mid-Ohio	**(United States) #7 Acura Team Penske**	did not participate	(United States) #3 Corvette Racing	(Canada) #14 AIM Vasser Sullivan	Report
7	Mid-Ohio	**(Brazil) Hélio Castroneves** **(United States) Ricky Taylor**	did not participate	(Spain) Antonio García (United States) Jordan Taylor	(United Kingdom) Jack Hawksworth (United States) Aaron Telitz	Report
8	Charlotte	did not participate	did not participate	**(United States) #3 Corvette Racing**	(United States) #96 Turner Motorsport	Report
8	Charlotte	did not participate	did not participate	**(Spain) Antonio García** **(United States) Jordan Taylor**	(United States) Bill Auberlen (United States) Robby Foley	Report
9	Road Atlanta (10 Hours)	**(United States) #10 Konica Minolta Cadillac DPi-V.R**	(United States) #8 Tower Motorsport by Starworks	(United States) #911 Porsche GT Team	(United States) #63 Scuderia Corsa	Report
9	Road Atlanta (10 Hours)	**(Australia) Ryan Briscoe** **(New Zealand) Scott Dixon** **(Netherlands) Renger van der Zande**	(Canada) John Farano (Denmark) Mikkel Jensen (Netherlands) Job van Uitert	(Australia) Matt Campbell (France) Frédéric Makowiecki (United Kingdom) Nick Tandy	(Italy) Alessandro Balzan (United States) Cooper MacNeil (United States) Jeff Westphal	Report
10	Laguna Seca	**(United States) #7 Acura Team Penske**	(United States) #52 PR1/Mathiasen Motorsports	(United States) #912 Porsche GT Team	(United States) #86 Meyer Shank Racing w/ Curb-Agajaninan	Report
10	Laguna Seca	**(Brazil) Hélio Castroneves** **(United States) Ricky Taylor**	(United States) Patrick Kelly (Switzerland) Simon Trummer	(New Zealand) Earl Bamber (Belgium) Laurens Vanthoor	(Germany) Mario Farnbacher (United States) Matt McMurry	Report
11	Sebring International Raceway (12 Hours)	**(Japan) #55 Mazda Motorsports**	(United States) #52 PR1/Mathiasen Motorsports	(United States) #911 Porsche GT Team	(United States) #16 Wright Motorsports	Report
11	Sebring International Raceway (12 Hours)	**(United States) Jonathan Bomarito** **(United States) Ryan Hunter-Reay** **(United Kingdom) Harry Tincknell**	(United States) Scott Huffaker (United States) Patrick Kelly (Switzerland) Simon Trummer	(New Zealand) Earl Bamber (France) Frédéric Makowiecki (United Kingdom) Nick Tandy	(United States) Ryan Hardwick (Belgium) Jan Heylen (United States) Patrick Long	Report

== Championship standings ==
=== Points systems ===
Championship points are awarded in each class at the finish of each event. Points are awarded based on finishing positions as shown in the chart below.

Position	1	2	3	4	5	6	7	8	9	10	11	12	13	14	15	16	17	18	19	20	21	22	23	24	25	26	27	28	29	30
Race	35	32	30	28	26	25	24	23	22	21	20	19	18	17	16	15	14	13	12	11	10	9	8	7	6	5	4	3	2	1

Drivers points

Points are awarded in each class at the finish of each event.

Team points

Team points are calculated in exactly the same way as driver points, using the point distribution chart. Each car entered is considered its own "team" regardless if it is a single entry or part of a two-car team.

Manufacturer points

There are also a number of manufacturer championships which utilize the same season-long point distribution chart. The manufacturer championships recognized by IMSA are as follows:

Daytona Prototype international (DPi): Engine & bodywork manufacturer
GT Le Mans (GTLM): Car manufacturer
GT Daytona (GTD): Car manufacturer

Each manufacturer receives finishing points for its highest finishing car in each class. The positions of subsequent finishing cars from the same manufacturer are not taken into consideration, and all other manufacturers move up in the order.

Example: Manufacturer A finishes 1st and 2nd at an event, and Manufacturer B finishes 3rd. Manufacturer A receives 35 first-place points while Manufacturer B would earn 32 second-place points.

Michelin Endurance Cup

The points system for the Michelin Endurance Cup is different from the normal points system. Points are awarded on a 5–4–3–2 basis for drivers, teams and manufacturers. The first finishing position at each interval earns five points, four points for second position, three points for third, with two points awarded for fourth and each subsequent finishing position.

Position	1	2	3	Other Classified
Race	5	4	3	2

At Daytona (24 hour race), points are awarded at six hours, 12 hours, 18 hours and at the finish. At the Sebring (12 hour race), points are awarded at four hours, eight hours and at the finish. At the Michelin Raceway September round (6 hour race), points are awarded at three hours and at the finish. At the Michelin Raceway October round (10 hour race), points are awarded at four hours, eight hours and at the finish.

Like the season-long team championship, Michelin Endurance Cup team points are awarded for each car and drivers get points in any car that they drive, in which they are entered for points. The manufacturer points go to the highest placed car from that manufacturer (the others from that manufacturer not being counted), just like the season-long manufacturer championship.

For example: in any particular segment manufacturer A finishes 1st and 2nd and manufacturer B finishes 3rd. Manufacturer A only receives first-place points for that segment. Manufacturer B receives the second-place points.

=== Drivers' championships ===
==== Daytona Prototype international ====
Pos.	Drivers	DAY1	DAY2	SEB1	ELK	ATL1	MOH	ATL2	LGA	SEB2	Points	MEC
1	(Brazil) Hélio Castroneves (United States) Ricky Taylor	8	**8**	7	**1**	**1**	1	2	1	**8**	265	31
2	(Australia) Ryan Briscoe (Netherlands) Renger van der Zande	1	6	2	2	5	3	1	6	7	264	42
3	(United States) Jonathan Bomarito (United Kingdom) Harry Tincknell	6	1	5	5	2	4	6	4	1	260	29
4	(Brazil) Pipo Derani	7	5	**1**	3	3	2	5	3	6	258	35
5	(France) Sébastien Bourdais	3	3	3	4	4	6	4	7	5	249	33
6	(United States) Dane Cameron (Colombia) Juan Pablo Montoya	4	4	6	8	6	**7**	**3**	**2**	2	247	36
7	(United Kingdom) Oliver Jarvis (United States) Tristan Nunez	**2**	2	4	6	7	5	7	5	3	247	34
8	(Brazil) Felipe Nasr	7		**1**	3	3	2	5	3	6	232	35
9	(France) Tristan Vautier	5	7	8	7	4	8	4	7	5	226	27
10	(Portugal) João Barbosa	3	3	3	4	4	6				171	18
11	(Brazil) Matheus Leist	5				8		8	8	4	123	24
12	(United States) Ryan Hunter-Reay	6				2		6		1	117	29
13	(France) Olivier Pla	**2**				7		7		3	110	34
14	(South Africa) Stephen Simpson			8		8			8	4	97	10
15	(United States) Chris Miller	5	7		7			8			97	14
16	(New Zealand) Scott Dixon	1						1		7	94	38
17	(France) Simon Pagenaud	4						**3**		2	90	29
18	(France) Loïc Duval	3						4		5	84	29
19	(Portugal) Filipe Albuquerque	7				3		5			80	28
20	(United States) Alexander Rossi	8						2		8	78	24
21	(Colombia) Gabby Chaves		5							6	51	7
22	(France) Gabriel Aubry						8	8			46	6
23	(Japan) Kamui Kobayashi	1									35	19
24	(Australia) Scott Andrews									4	28	6
25	(Colombia) Juan Piedrahita	5									26	8
26	(United Kingdom) Mike Conway	7									24	10
Pos.	Drivers	DAY1	DAY2	SEB1	ELK	ATL1	MOH	ATL2	LGA	SEB2	Points	MEC

Colour	Result
Gold	Winner
Silver	Second place
Bronze	Third place
Green	Points classification
Blue	Non-points classification
Blue	Non-classified finish (NC)
Purple	Retired, not classified (Ret)
Red	Did not qualify (DNQ)
Red	Did not pre-qualify (DNPQ)
Black	Disqualified (DSQ)
White	Did not start (DNS)
White	Withdrew (WD)
White	Race cancelled (C)
Blank	Did not practice (DNP)
Blank	Did not arrive (DNA)
Blank	Excluded (EX)

**Bold** - Pole position
Italics - Fastest lap

==== Le Mans Prototype 2 ====
Pos.	Drivers	DAY†	SEB1	ELK	ATL1	ATL2	LGA	SEB2	Points	MEC
1	(United States) Patrick Kelly		**1**	**4**	**1**	**4**	**1**	**1**	196	37
2	(Switzerland) Simon Trummer	**2**		**4**	**1**	**4**	**1**	**1**	161	55
3	(United States) Scott Huffaker				**1**	**4**		**1**	98	37
4	(Canada) John Farano	4	4			1		2	95	33
5	(United States) Dwight Merriman (United Kingdom) Kyle Tilley	3	3	3	2				92	19
6	(Denmark) Mikkel Jensen					1		2	67	23
7	(Canada) Cameron Cassels	5	2	2					64	8
8	(United States) Colin Braun	1			2	2			64	34
9	(Sweden) Henrik Hedman	1	5	1					61	17
10	(United Kingdom) Matthew Bell					2		4	60	16
11	(Poland) Jakub Śmiechowski					3		4	58	15
12	(United States) Spencer Pigot		**1**						35	–
13	(United Kingdom) Ben Hanley	1		1					35	17
14	(Netherlands) Job van Uitert					1			35	13
15	(United States) Kyle Masson	5	2						32	8
16	(United States) James French			2					32	–
17	(United States) James McGuire					2			32	9
18	(Denmark) David Heinemeier Hansson	4						2	32	20
19	(United States) Rob Hodes (United States) Austin McCusker					3			30	8
20	(United States) Don Yount	5						3	30	18
20	(United States) Patrick Byrne							3	30	10
20	(United States) Guy Cosmo							3	30	10
21	(United Kingdom) Ryan Dalziel	4	4						28	10
22	(United States) Naveen Rao							4	28	7
23	(United States) Gustavo Menezes		5						26	–
–	(United Kingdom) Harrison Newey	1							–	17
–	(France) Gabriel Aubry (United States) Nicholas Boulle (United States) Ben Keating	**2**							–	18
–	(United Kingdom) Ryan Lewis (France) Nicolas Minassian	3							–	11
–	(France) Nicolas Lapierre	4							–	10
–	(United States) Robert Masson	5							–	8
Pos.	Drivers	DAY†	SEB1	ELK	ATL1	ATL2	LGA	SEB2	Points	MEC

† Points only counted towards the Michelin Endurance Cup, and not the overall LMP2 Championship.

==== GT Le Mans ====
Pos.	Drivers	DAY1	DAY2	SEB1	ELK	VIR	ATL1	MOH	CLT	ATL2	LGA	SEB2	Points	MEC
1	(Spain) Antonio García (United States) Jordan Taylor	4	1	**2**	1	1	5	**1**	**1**	**2**	**2**	**5**	351	32
2	(United States) John Edwards (Finland) Jesse Krohn	1	6	5	3	6	3	4	2	3	4	3	319	48
3	(United Kingdom) Oliver Gavin (United States) Tommy Milner	7	**5**	1	2	4	2	2	4	4	6	6	315	26
4	(United States) Connor De Phillippi (Canada) Bruno Spengler	5	4	4	6	2	1	3	3	6	5	4	313	30
5	(France) Frédéric Makowiecki (United Kingdom) Nick Tandy	**3**	3	6	4	**3**	**4**		5	1	3	1	297	43
6	(New Zealand) Earl Bamber (Belgium) Laurens Vanthoor	2	2	3	**5**	5	6		6	5	1	2	289	37
7	(Brazil) Augusto Farfus	1								3		3	95	42
8	(Netherlands) Nick Catsburg	4								**2**		**5**	86	18
9	(United States) Colton Herta	5								6		4	79	21
10	(Switzerland) Marcel Fässler	7								4		6	77	20
11	(Australia) Matt Campbell	**3**								1			65	24
12	(France) Mathieu Jaminet	2								5			58	25
13	(Australia) Chaz Mostert	1											35	18
14	(Switzerland) Neel Jani											2	32	8
15	(Austria) Philipp Eng	5											26	8
16	(United Kingdom) James Calado (Italy) Alessandro Pier Guidi (Italy) Davide Rigon (Brazil) Daniel Serra	6											25	8
Pos.	Drivers	DAY1	DAY2	SEB1	ELK	VIR	ATL1	MOH	CLT	ATL2	LGA	SEB2	Points	MEC

==== GT Daytona ====
Pos.	Drivers	DAY1	DAY2	SEB1†	ELK	VIR	ATL1	MOH	CLT	ATL2	LGA	SEB2	Points	WTSC	MEC
1	(Germany) Mario Farnbacher (United States) Matt McMurry	10	3		2	2	1	5	7	**10**	**1**	3	288	181	33
2	(United States) Ryan Hardwick (United States) Patrick Long	4	7	9	5	5	3	3	2	4	6	**1**	284	185	29
3	(United States) Aaron Telitz	12	1	1	**3**	4	**5**	**1**	**8**	2	11	12	267	206	30
4	(United Kingdom) Jack Hawksworth	9	1	1	**3**	4	10	**1**	**8**	2	11	12	265	206	29
5	(United States) Robby Foley	6	8	3	7	1	11	11	1	9	2	11	256	199	24
6	(United States) Townsend Bell	12	2	**5**	1	9	**5**	10	4	8	8	9	251	187	25
7	(Canada) Mikhail Goikhberg	8	4		12	6	7	6	5	6	3	6	250	153	25
8	(United States) Lawson Aschenbach (United States) Gar Robinson	11	6	4	6	3	4	2	10	12	9	8	245	183	28
9	(United States) Andy Lally (United States) John Potter	2	9	10	8	7	12	7	11	3	5	7	244	160	32
10	(United States) Bill Auberlen	6	8	3	7	1	11	11	1	9	2		236	199	18
11	(United States) Spencer Pumpelly	2	12	8	10	13	12	12	6	3	10	7	228	136	32
12	(Portugal) Álvaro Parente	8	4		12	6	7	6	5	6	3		225	153	19
13	(United States) Frankie Montecalvo	12	2	**5**	1	9	**5**	10		8	8	9	223	159	25
14	(United States) Cooper MacNeil	7	5	2	4	12	9			1	7	4	206	129	35
15	(Canada) Roman De Angelis (United Kingdom) Ian James	18			DNS	8	6	4	3	11	4	2	199	109	27
16	(United States) Robert Ferriol		12	8	10	13		12	6	13	10	5	167	146	12
17	(United States) Marc Miller		10	7	11	10		9	12		12	8	145	146	10
18	(United States) Bryan Sellers (United States) Madison Snow	1				14	2			7		13	126	17	44
19	(United States) Michael de Quesada	9					10		4	2		9	125	28	29
20	(United States) Paul Holton		**11**	6	9	**11**		8	9		13		125	150	–
21	(United Kingdom) Till Bechtolsheimer		10	7	11	10		9	12		12		122	146	–
22	(Finland) Toni Vilander	7	5	2	4	12	9						119	105	14
23	(Italy) Alessandro Balzan	7								1	7	4	111	24	31
24	(United States) Corey Lewis	1					2			7		13	109	–	44
25	(United States) Jeff Westphal	7					9			1		4	109	–	35
26	(Japan) Shinya Michimi	10					1			**10**		3	107	–	33
27	(United States) Trent Hindman	8					7			6		6	97	–	25
28	(Belgium) Jan Heylen						3			4		**1**	93	–	21
29	(United States) Dillon Machavern	6					11			9		11	87	–	24
30	(United States) Corey Fergus		**11**	6	9	**11**		8					85	110	–
31	(United Kingdom) Darren Turner						6			11		2	77	–	19
32	(United States) Ben Keating	11					4			12			67	–	18
33	(United States) Richard Heistand (France) Franck Perera (Netherlands) Steijn Schothorst	14					8					10	61	–	18
34	(United States) Andrew Davis									13		5	46	–	12
35	(Germany) Lars Kern (Norway) Dennis Olsen (Canada) Zacharie Robichon	**13**								5			44	–	14
36	(United States) Parker Chase	9					10						43	–	12
37	(United States) Kyle Kirkwood									8		12	42	–	12
38	(Canada) Jeff Kingsley								9		13		40	40	–
39	(Italy) Andrea Caldarelli	1											35	–	18
40	(Italy) Marco Mapelli	2											32	–	15
41	(Italy) Mirko Bortolotti (Switzerland) Rolf Ineichen (Canada) Daniel Morad (Belgium) Dries Vanthoor	3											30	–	13
42	(Austria) Klaus Bachler (United States) Anthony Imperato	4											28	–	8
43	(Netherlands) Jeroen Bleekemolen (United States) Trenton Estep (Germany) Sven Müller (United States) Tim Pappas	5											26	–	8
44	(Germany) Pierre Kaffer											5	26	–	6
45	(Germany) Jens Klingmann	6											25	–	8
46	(United States) Joey Hand											6	25	–	6
47	(United States) A. J. Allmendinger	8											23	–	8
48	(United States) Kyle Busch	9											22	–	8
49	(France) Jules Gounon	10											21	–	8
50	(Brazil) Felipe Fraga	11											20	–	8
51	(United Kingdom) Nick Yelloly											11	20	–	6
52	(New Zealand) Shane van Gisbergen	12											19	–	8
53	(France) Patrick Pilet	**13**											18	–	8
54	(Germany) Markus Winkelhock									13			18	–	6
55	(Spain) Albert Costa	14											17	–	8
56	(United States) Brandon Gdovic (United Kingdom) Jonathan Hoggard (United States) Mark Kvamme (United States) Eric Lux	15											16	–	8
57	(Colombia) Tatiana Calderón (Switzerland) Rahel Frey (United Kingdom) Katherine Legge (Denmark) Christina Nielsen	16											15	–	8
58	(United Kingdom) Ross Gunn (Portugal) Pedro Lamy (Austria) Mathias Lauda (United Kingdom) Andrew Watson	17											14	–	8
59	(Spain) Alex Riberas (Denmark) Nicki Thiim	18											13	–	8
Pos.	Drivers	DAY1	DAY2	SEB1†	ELK	VIR	ATL1	MOH	CLT	ATL2	LGA	SEB2	Points	WTSC	MEC

† Points only counted towards the WeatherTech Sprint Cup and not the overall GTD Championship.

=== Team's Championships ===
==== Standings: Daytona Prototype international ====
Pos.	Team	Car	DAY1	DAY2	SEB1	ELK	ATL1	MOH	ATL2	LGA	SEB2	Points	MEC
1	#7 Acura Team Penske	Acura ARX-05	8	**8**	7	**1**	**1**	1	2	1	**8**	265	31
2	#10 Konica Minolta Cadillac DPi-V.R	Cadillac DPi-V.R	1	6	2	2	5	3	1	6	7	264	42
3	#55 Mazda Motorsports	Mazda RT24-P	6	1	5	5	2	4	6	4	1	260	29
4	#31 Whelen Engineering Racing	Cadillac DPi-V.R	7	5	**1**	3	3	2	5	3	6	258	35
5	#5 Mustang Sampling Racing / JDC-Miller MotorSports	Cadillac DPi-V.R	3	3	3	4	4	6	4	7	5	249	33
6	#77 Mazda Motorsports	Mazda RT24-P	**2**	2	4	6	7	5	7	5	3	247	34
7	#6 Acura Team Penske	Acura ARX-05	4	4	6	8	6	**7**	**3**	**2**	2	247	36
8	#85 JDC-Miller MotorSports	Cadillac DPi-V.R	5	7	8	7	8	8	8	8	4	217	24
Pos.	Team	Car	DAY1	DAY2	SEB1	ELK	ATL1	MOH	ATL2	LGA	SEB2	Points	MEC

==== Standings: Le Mans Prototype 2 ====
Pos.	Team	Car	DAY†	SEB1	ELK	ATL1	ATL2	LGA	SEB2	Points	MEC
1	#52 PR1/Mathiasen Motorsports	Oreca 07	**2**	**1**	**4**	**1**	**4**	**1**	**1**	196	55
2	#38 Performance Tech Motorsports	Oreca 07	5	2	2		2		3	126	27
3	#8 Tower Motorsport by Starworks	Oreca 07	4	4			1		2	95	33
4	#18 Era Motorsport	Oreca 07	3	3	3	2				92	19
5	#81 DragonSpeed USA	Oreca 07	1	5	1					61	17
6	#51 Inter Europol Competition	Oreca 07					3		4	58	15
Pos.	Team	Car	DAY†	SEB1	ELK	ATL1	ATL2	LGA	SEB2	Points	MEC

† Points only counted towards the Michelin Endurance Cup and not the overall LMP2 Championship.

==== Standings: GT Le Mans ====
Pos.	Team	Car	DAY1	DAY2	SEB1	ELK	VIR	ATL1	MOH	CLT	ATL2	LGA	SEB2	Points	MEC
1	#3 Corvette Racing	Chevrolet Corvette C8.R	4	1	**2**	1	1	5	**1**	**1**	**2**	**2**	**5**	351	32
2	#24 BMW Team RLL	BMW M8 GTE	1	6	5	3	6	3	4	2	3	4	3	320	48
3	#4 Corvette Racing	Chevrolet Corvette C8.R	7	**5**	1	2	4	2	2	4	4	6	6	315	26
4	#25 BMW Team RLL	BMW M8 GTE	5	4	4	6	2	1	3	3	6	5	4	313	30
5	#911 Porsche GT Team	Porsche 911 RSR-19	**3**	3	6	4	**3**	**4**		5	1	3	1	297	43
6	#912 Porsche GT Team	Porsche 911 RSR-19	2	2	3	**5**	5	6		6	5	1	2	289	37
7	#62 Risi Competizione	Ferrari 488 GTE Evo	6											25	8
Pos.	Team	Car	DAY1	DAY2	SEB1	ELK	VIR	ATL1	MOH	CLT	ATL2	LGA	SEB2	Points	MEC

==== Standings: GT Daytona ====
Pos.	Team	Car	DAY1	DAY2	SEB1†	ELK	VIR	ATL1	MOH	CLT	ATL2	LGA	SEB2	Points	WTSC	MEC
1	#86 Meyer Shank Racing with Curb-Agajanian	Acura NSX GT3 Evo	10	3		2	2	1	5	7	**10**	**1**	3	288	181	33
2	#16 Wright Motorsports	Porsche 911 GT3 R	4	7	9	5	5	3	3	2	4	6	**1**	284	185	29
3	#14 AIM Vasser Sullivan	Lexus RC F GT3	9	1	1	**3**	4	10	**1**	**8**	2	11	12	265	206	29
4	#96 Turner Motorsport	BMW M6 GT3	6	8	3	7	1	11	11	1	9	2	11	256	199	24
5	#12 AIM Vasser Sullivan	Lexus RC F GT3	12	2	**5**	1	9	**5**	10	4	8	8	9	251	187	25
6	#57 Heinricher Racing with MSR Curb-Agajanian	Acura NSX GT3 Evo	8	4		12	6	7	6	5	6	3	6	250	153	25
7	#74 Riley Motorsports	Mercedes-AMG GT3 Evo	11	6	4	6	3	4	2	10	12	9	8	245	183	28
8	#44 GRT Magnus	Lamborghini Huracán GT3 Evo	2	9	10	8	7	12	7	11	3	5	7	244	160	32
9	#63 Scuderia Corsa	Ferrari 488 GT3 Evo 2020	7	5	2	4	12	9			1	7	4	206	129	35
10	#23 Heart of Racing Team	Aston Martin Vantage AMR GT3	18			DNS	8	6	4	3	11	4	2	199	109	27
11	#30 Team Hardpoint	Audi R8 LMS Evo		12	8	10	13		12	6	13	10	5	167	146	12
12	#48 Paul Miller Racing	Lamborghini Huracán GT3 Evo	1				14	2			7		13	126	17	44
13	#76 Compass Racing	McLaren 720S GT3		**11**	6	9	**11**		8	9		13		125	150	–
14	#22 Gradient Racing	Acura NSX GT3 Evo		10	7	11	10		9	12		12		122	146	–
15	#11 GRT Grasser Racing Team	Lamborghini Huracán GT3 Evo	14					8					10	61	–	18
16	#9 Pfaff Motorsports	Porsche 911 GT3 R	**13**								5			44	–	14
17	#88 WRT Speedstar Audi Sport	Audi R8 LMS Evo	3											30	–	13
18	#54 Black Swan Racing	Porsche 911 GT3 R	5											26	–	8
19	#47 Precision Performance Motorsports	Lamborghini Huracán GT3 Evo	15											16	–	8
20	#19 GEAR Racing powered by GRT Grasser	Lamborghini Huracán GT3 Evo	16											15	–	8
21	#98 Aston Martin Racing	Aston Martin Vantage AMR GT3	17											14	–	8
Pos.	Team	Car	DAY1	DAY2	SEB1†	ELK	VIR	ATL1	MOH	CLT	ATL2	LGA	SEB2	Points	WTSC	MEC

† Points only counted towards the WeatherTech Sprint Cup and not the overall GTD Championship.

=== Manufacturer's Championships ===
==== Standings: Daytona Prototype international ====
Pos.	Manufacturer	DAY1	DAY2	SEB1	ELK	ATL1	MOH	ATL2	LGA	SEB2	Points	MEC
1	(Japan) Acura	4	**4**	6	**1**	**1**	**1**	**2**	**1**	**2**	294	46
2	(United States) Cadillac	1	3	**1**	2	3	2	1	3	4	291	54
3	(Japan) Mazda	**2**	1	4	5	2	4	6	4	1	286	44
Pos.	Manufacturer	DAY1	DAY2	SEB1	ELK	ATL1	MOH	ATL2	LGA	SEB2	Points	MEC

==== Standings: GT Le Mans ====
Pos.	Manufacturer	DAY1	DAY2	SEB1	ELK	VIR	ATL1	MOH	CLT	ATL2	LGA	SEB2	Points	MEC
1	(United States) Chevrolet	4	**1**	**1**	1	1	2	**1**	**1**	**2**	**2**	**5**	362	41
2	(Germany) BMW	1	5	4	3	2	1	3	2	3	4	3	348	53
3	(Germany) Porsche	**2**	2	3	**4**	**3**	**4**	WD	5	1	1	1	321	50
4	(Italy) Ferrari	6											28	8
Pos.	Manufacturer	DAY1	DAY2	SEB1	ELK	VIR	ATL1	MOH	CLT	ATL2	LGA	SEB2	Points	MEC

==== Standings: GT Daytona ====
Pos.	Manufacturer	DAY1	DAY2	SEB1†	ELK	VIR	ATL1	MOH	CLT	ATL2	LGA	SEB2	Points	WTSC	MEC
1	(Japan) Acura	8	3	7	2	2	1	5	5	**6**	**1**	3	299	210	34
2	(Germany) Porsche	**4**	7	9	5	5	3	3	2	4	6	**1**	291	191	31
3	(Japan) Lexus	9	1	**1**	**1**	4	**5**	**1**	**4**	2	8	9	290	223	32
4	(Germany) BMW	6	8	3	7	1	11	11	1	9	2	11	273	205	24
5	(Italy) Lamborghini	1	9	10	8	7	2	7	11	3	5	7	270	167	47
6	(Germany) Mercedes-AMG	11	6	4	6	3	4	2	10	12	9	8	260	190	28
7	(Italy) Ferrari	7	5	2	4	12	9			1	7	4	220	139	35
8	(United Kingdom) Aston Martin	17			DNS	8	6	4	3	11	4	2	215	112	27
9	(Germany) Audi	3	12	8	10	13		12	6	13	10	5	214	158	26
10	(United Kingdom) McLaren		**11**	6	9	**11**		8	9		13		138	164	–
Pos.	Manufacturer	DAY1	DAY2	SEB1†	ELK	VIR	ATL1	MOH	CLT	ATL2	LGA	SEB2	Points	WTSC	MEC

† Points only counted towards the WeatherTech Sprint Cup and not the overall GTD Championship.
