= IMSA SportsCar Championship =

North American auto racing series

- Country: United States; Canada
- Region: North America
- Inaugural season: 2014
- Prototype classes: Grand Touring Prototype (GTP) & Le Mans Prototype 2 (LMP2)
- GT classes: GT Daytona Pro (GTD Pro) & GT Daytona (GTD)
- Teams: 44
- Constructors: GTP: Porsche • Cadillac • Aston Martin • BMW • Acura (HRC US); GTD Pro: Aston Martin • BMW • Chevrolet & Pratt Miller • Lamborghini • Lexus • Porsche • Ford • Mercedes-Benz • Ferrari; GTD: Aston Martin • BMW • Chevrolet & Pratt Miller • Lamborghini • Lexus • Porsche • Ford • Mercedes-Benz • Ferrari
- Chassis manufacturers: GTP: Multimatic • Dallara • Oreca; LMP2: Oreca
- Engine manufacturers: LMP2: Gibson
- Tire suppliers: Continental (2014–2018 Prototype and GTD); Michelin (2014–2018 GTLM; 2019–present all classes)
- Drivers' champion: GTP: (United Kingdom) Jack Aitken; LMP2: (United States) George Kurtz (United Kingdom) Alex Quinn; GTD Pro: (United States) Connor De Phillippi (United States) Neil Verhagen; GTD: (Switzerland) Philip Ellis (United States) Russell Ward
- Makes' champion: GTP: (United States) Cadillac; GTD Pro: (United States) Chevrolet; GTD: (Germany) Mercedes-AMG
- Teams' champion: GTP: (United States) Cadillac Whelen; LMP2: (United States) CrowdStrike Racing by APR; GTD Pro: (United States) Paul Miller Racing; GTD: (United States) Winward Racing
- Official website: imsa.com/weathertech/

The IMSA SportsCar Championship, currently known as the IMSA WeatherTech SportsCar Championship under sponsorship, is a sports car racing series based in the United States and Canada and organized by the International Motor Sports Association (IMSA). It is considered the pinnacle of sports car racing in North America, attracting top-tier manufacturers, teams and drivers. The championship features prototypes and GT cars competing across various classes and consists of both long-distance endurance races and shorter sprint races.

The series traces its roots to the IMSA GT Championship, which began in 1971 and ran until 1998. From the late 1990s until 2013, top-level sports car racing in North America was split between the high-tech American Le Mans Series and the low-cost Rolex Sports Car Series. These two series were merged in 2014 to form the United SportsCar Championship, which was subsequently renamed as the IMSA SportsCar Championship in 2016. Rolex SA's Tudor brand was the title sponsor of the championship in 2014 and 2015, and WeatherTech has served as title sponsor since 2016.

The season begins with its premier race, the Rolex 24 at Daytona, the last weekend of January and ends with the Petit Le Mans, another Michelin Endurance Cup race, in early October.

== History ==
On September 5, 2012, it was announced that the Grand-Am Road Racing sanctioning body would merge with the Braselton-based International Motor Sports Association, and as such, both bodies would merge their premiere sports car series, the Rolex Sports Car Series and American Le Mans Series respectively, with plans to debut in 2014. On November 20, 2012, the merger committee announced that SME Branding were selected to develop the name, logo and identity of the new series.

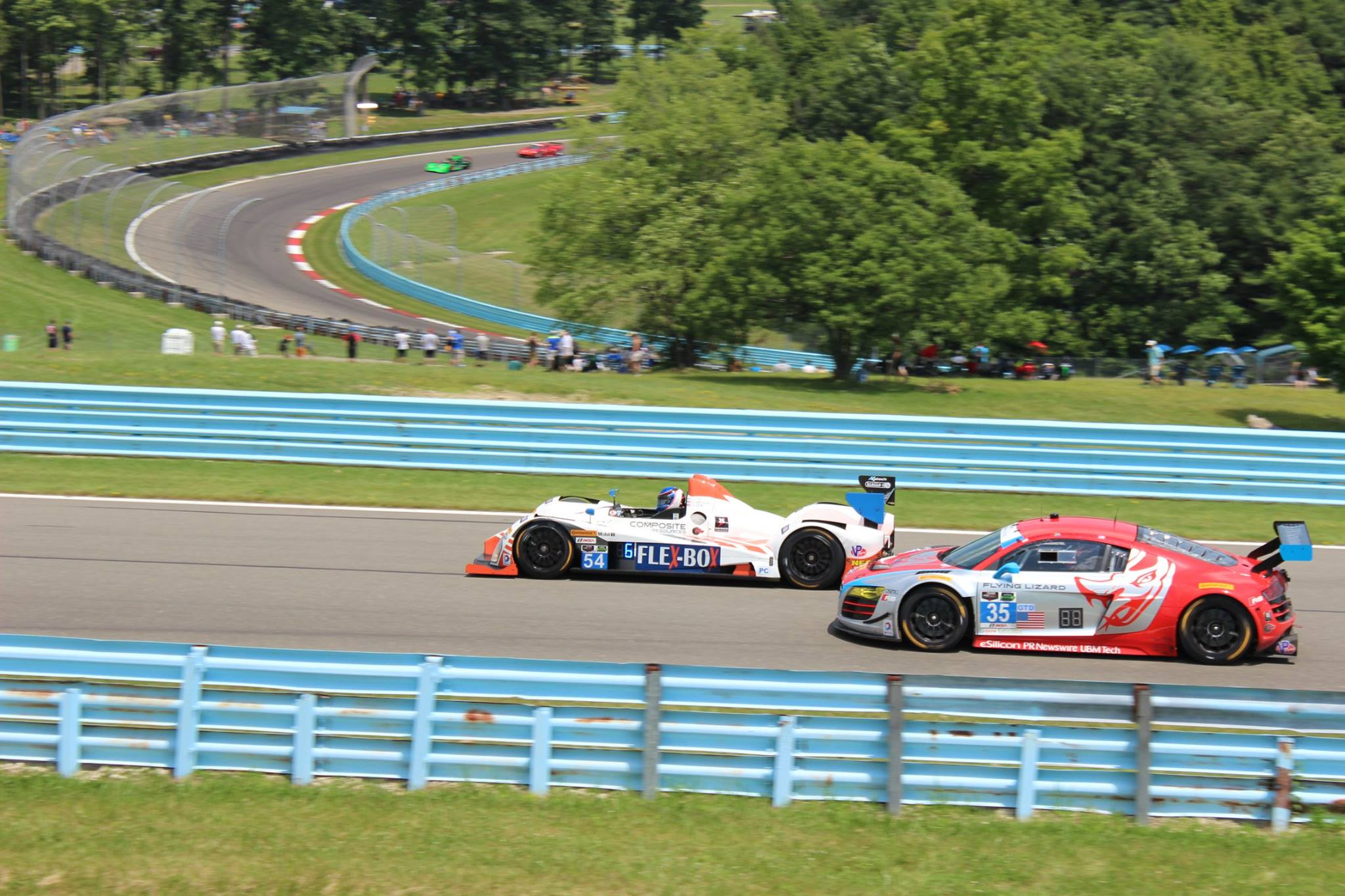
2014 Sahlen's Six Hours of the Glen

On January 8, 2013, the two series' announced a preliminary class structure for the new merged series. Grand-Am's Daytona Prototype category and IMSA's P2 would combine into a single-prototype class, with allowances for the unique DeltaWing to also compete in the new class. The Le Mans Prototype Challenge class of single spec cars from the American Le Mans Series would continue as is, although the cars were to switch to Grand-Am's Continental Tires. The GT class of the American Le Mans Series would remain unchanged, while Grand-Am's GT class would form another GT class, and be combined with the American Le Mans GTC category. The only category of cars not represented in the new series is the American Le Mans Series' P1 category.

The reveal date for the new series was March 14, 2013 at the Chateau Élan Hotel and Conference Center at Sebring International Raceway, two days before the 12 Hours of Sebring. American Le Mans CEO Scott Atherton announced the new sanctioning body would remain IMSA while Ed Bennett revealed the new titles for the series' five classes. SME Branding Senior Partner Ed O'Hara then announced the new United SportsCar Racing title and logo, a name submitted through a contest won by Louis Satterlee of Florida, a racer in the Florida Karting Championship Series.

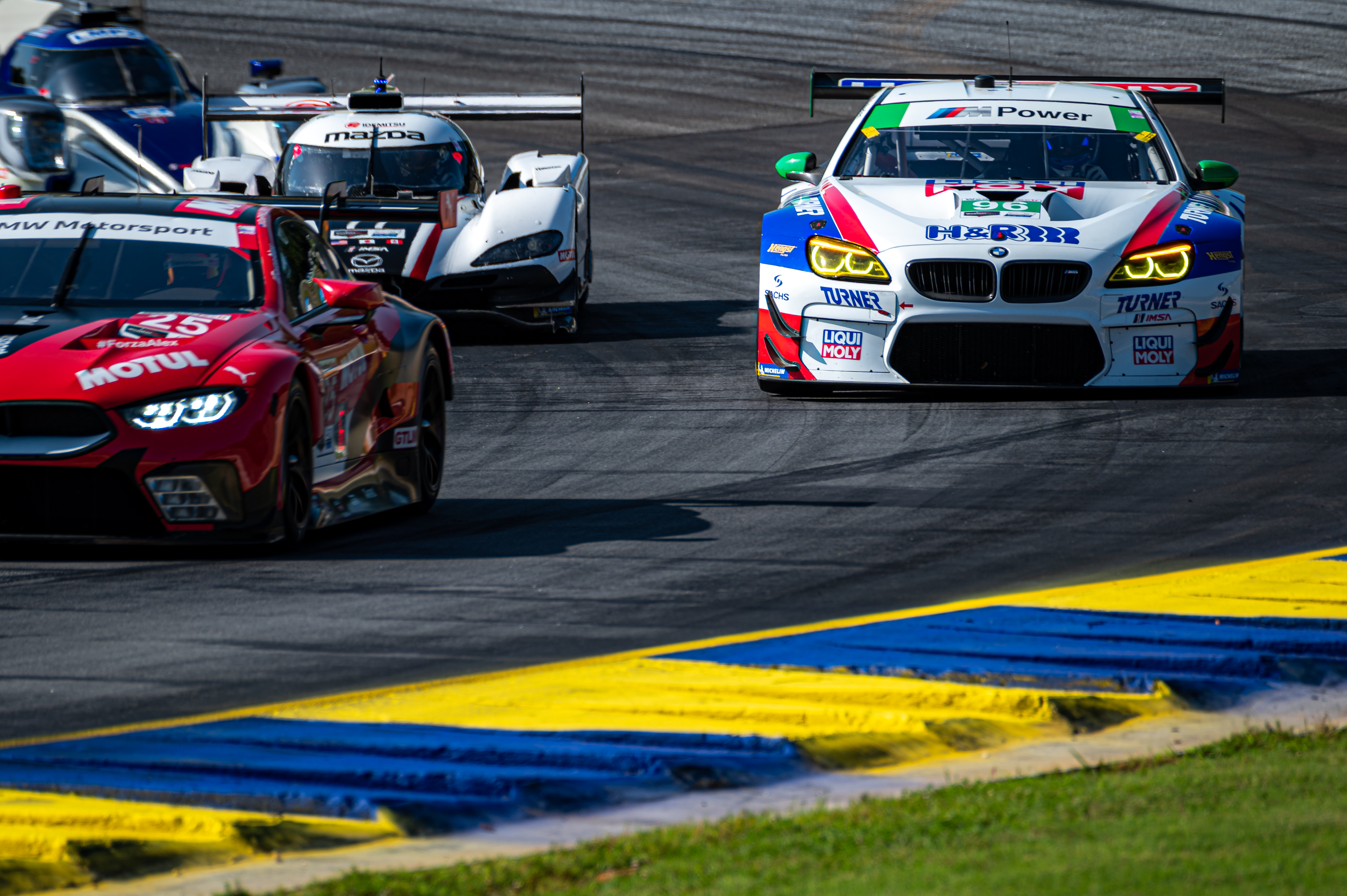
2020 6 Hours of Road Atlanta

On August 9, 2013, Fox Sports 1 announced it had signed a TV contract with IMSA to televise the entire USCC season between 2014 and 2018.

On September 12, 2013, Tudor was announced as the title sponsor for the series, which was named the United SportsCar Championship. On August 8, 2015, WeatherTech was announced as the new title sponsor for the series, renaming the series to the WeatherTech SportsCar Championship, starting with the 2016 season.

Beginning with the 2019 season, the series is covered exclusively by NBC Sports in the United States. The NBC broadcast network will air nine hours of coverage annually, with the majority of the coverage airing on NBCSN. CNBC and the NBC Sports app will provide supplemental coverage. Beginning with 2022, USA Network replaced NBCSN as the cable home to the series.

== Michelin Pilot Challenge ==
Originally based on a Canadian series before being acquired by Grand-Am, the Continental Tire Sports Car Challenge (originally known as Grand-Am Cup) is a production-based touring car series. The series is split into two classes known as Grand Sport (GS), intended for large capacity GT-style cars, and Street Tuner (ST), consisting of smaller sedans and coupes, some of which are front-wheel drive. The IMSA Continental Tire Sports Car Challenge until 2013 supported some Rolex Series races but also headlined some of its own dates. This series continued with the United SportsCar Championship after the merger and is somewhat comparable to the old Trans Am Series.

== Michelin Endurance Cup ==
The IMSA Michelin Endurance Cup (MEC) is a championship for drivers, teams and manufacturers, which comprises the five endurance races on the IMSA WeatherTech SportsCar Championship schedule. It began in 2014 in the inaugural United SportsCar Championship season, where it was called the Tequila Patrón North American Endurance Cup. In 2019, Michelin became the title sponsor. The current five races that award MEC points are the 24 Hours of Daytona, 12 Hours of Sebring, 6 Hours of Watkins Glen, SportsCar Endurance Grand Prix and the Petit Le Mans.

Points are awarded at varying intervals depending on the length of the race. Six hour races award points at three hours and the finish, while Petit Le Mans offers points at four, eight and ten hours. Sebring awards points every four hours and Daytona awards them every six hours.

== Class structure ==
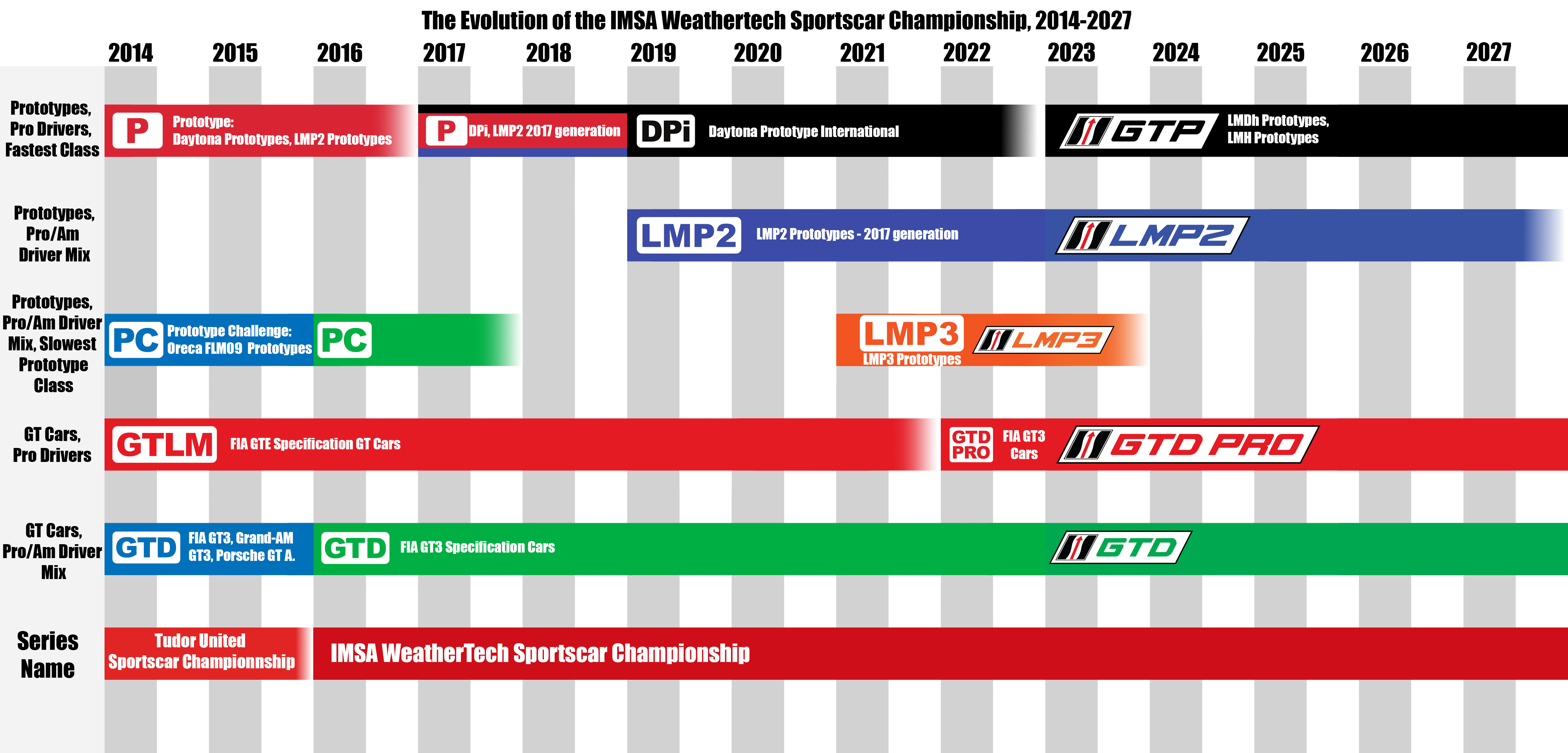
A chart tracking class changes, 2014 to 2027. Colors used on the chart are also those used on the driver numbers, wing mirrors, and windshields of cars during races to identify their class.

There are four classes in the IMSA SportsCar Championship series, featuring two sports prototype categories and two grand tourer classes. Some races may only use selected classes of cars; for example, any class car may be permitted entry at Daytona, the Chevrolet Grand Prix at Mosport does not feature the Grand Touring Prototype (GTP) class, while at the appropriately-named GT Challenge at VIR only GT Daytona Pro (GTD Pro) and GT Daytona (GTD) cars are entered. Grand Touring Prototype (GTP), Le Mans Prototype 2 (LMP2), and Grand Touring Daytona (GTD) cars are compatible with regulations for the 24 Hours of Le Mans.

Classes are also distinguished by regulations on driver lineups, using a rating system. GTP and GTD Pro have no restrictions; however, teams competing in LMP2 can only field one gold driver, and teams competing in GTD must field one "amateur" driver with a bronze or silver rating.

=== Sports Prototype classes ===
==== Grand Touring Prototype (GTP) ====
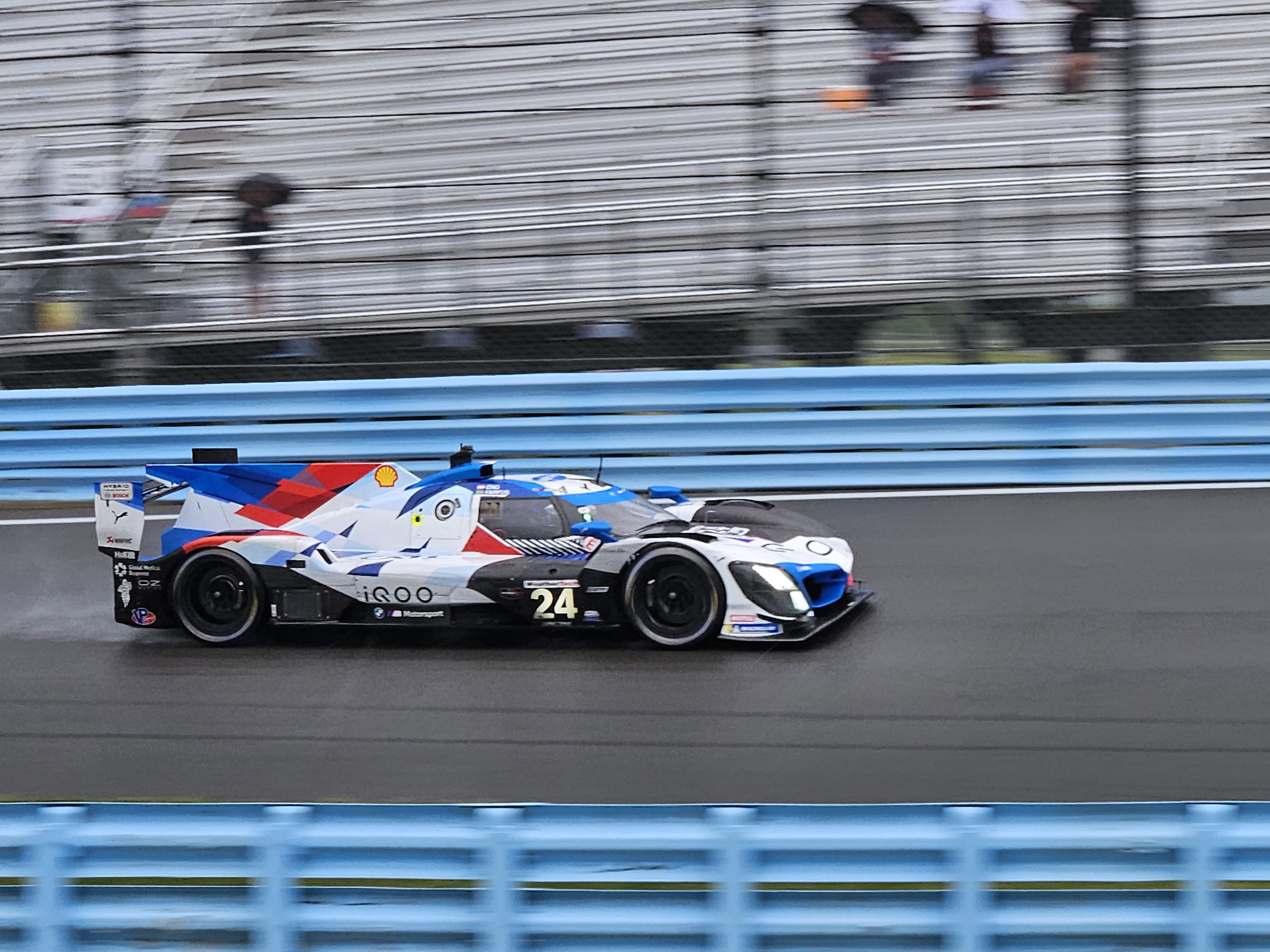
A BMW M Hybrid V8 GTP at Sahlen's Six Hours of the Glen.

The flagship class of the championship that replaced the DPi (Daytona Prototype International) class starting in 2023, featuring cars built to IMSA's LMDh and Automobile Club de l'Ouest's Le Mans Hypercar regulations.

==== Le Mans Prototype 2 (LMP2) ====
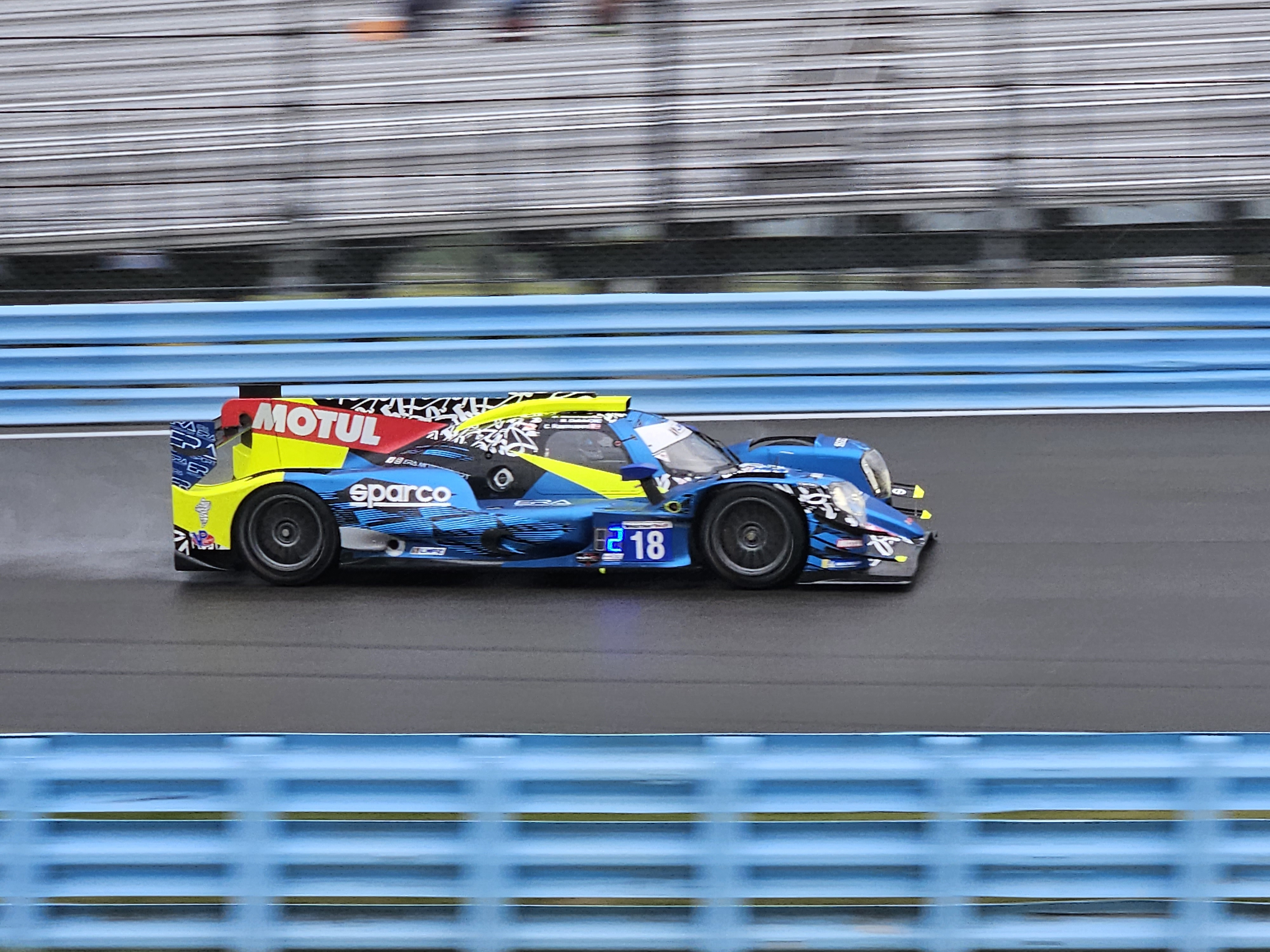
An Oreca 07 LMP2 at Sahlen's Six Hours of the Glen.

A class introduced since 2019 after being split from the DPi class (2019–2022), it features pro-am driver lineups; additionally, only Bronze-rated (amateur) drivers are allowed to drive qualifying laps. The class features cars built by Automobile Club de l'Ouest's (ACO) 4 licensed manufacturers (Riley-Multimatic, Ligier, Oreca and Dallara) to the specifications of the FIA/ACO 2017 Global LMP2 regulations.

=== Grand Touring classes ===
==== GT Daytona Pro (GTD Pro) ====
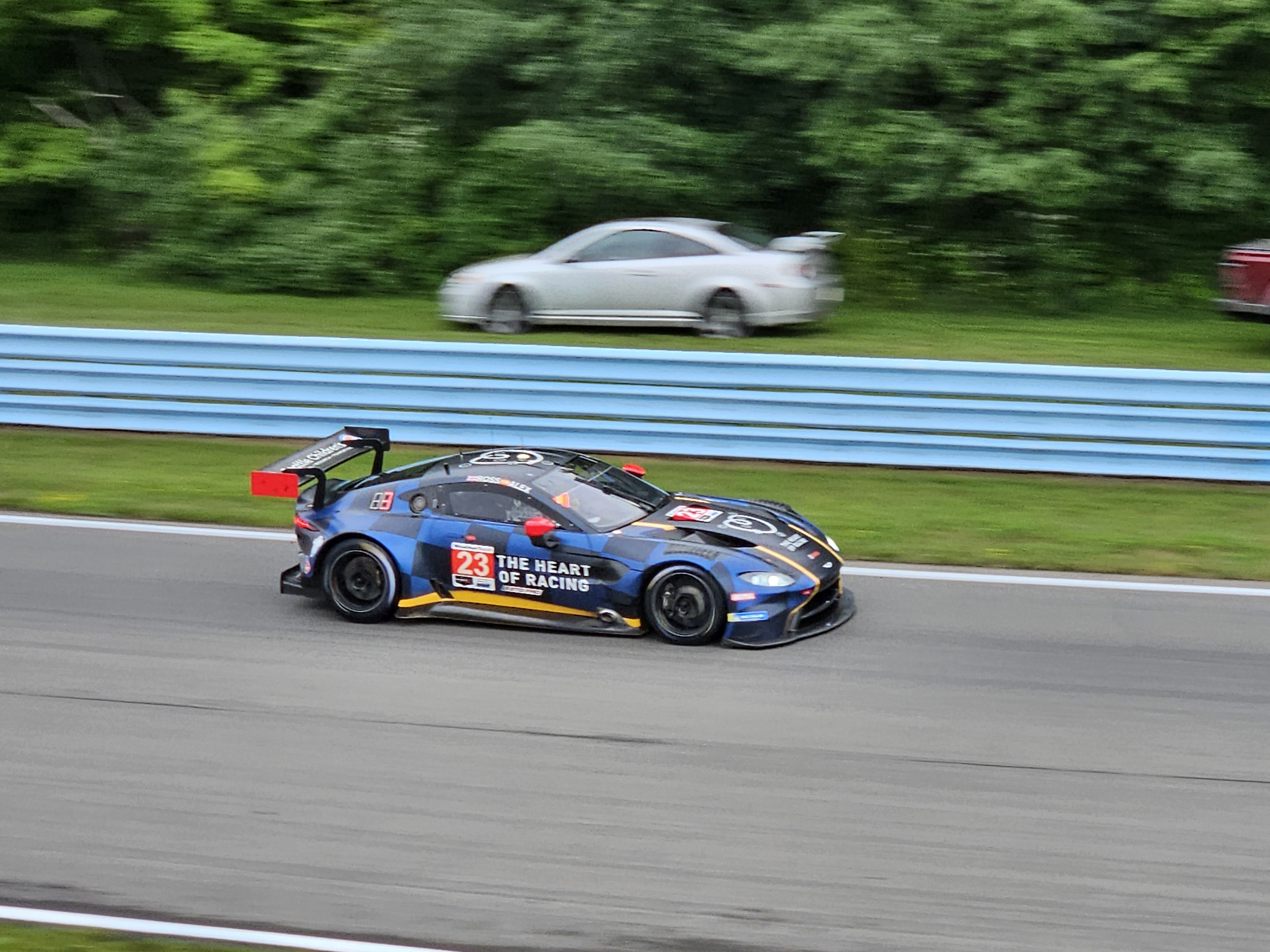
An Aston Martin Vantage AMR GT3 GTD Pro at Sahlen's Six Hours of the Glen.

A class that utilizes the FIA GT3 specifications that replaced the GTLM class starting in the 2022 Season. GTD Pro is an "open" class with no driver rating restrictions.

==== GT Daytona (GTD) ====
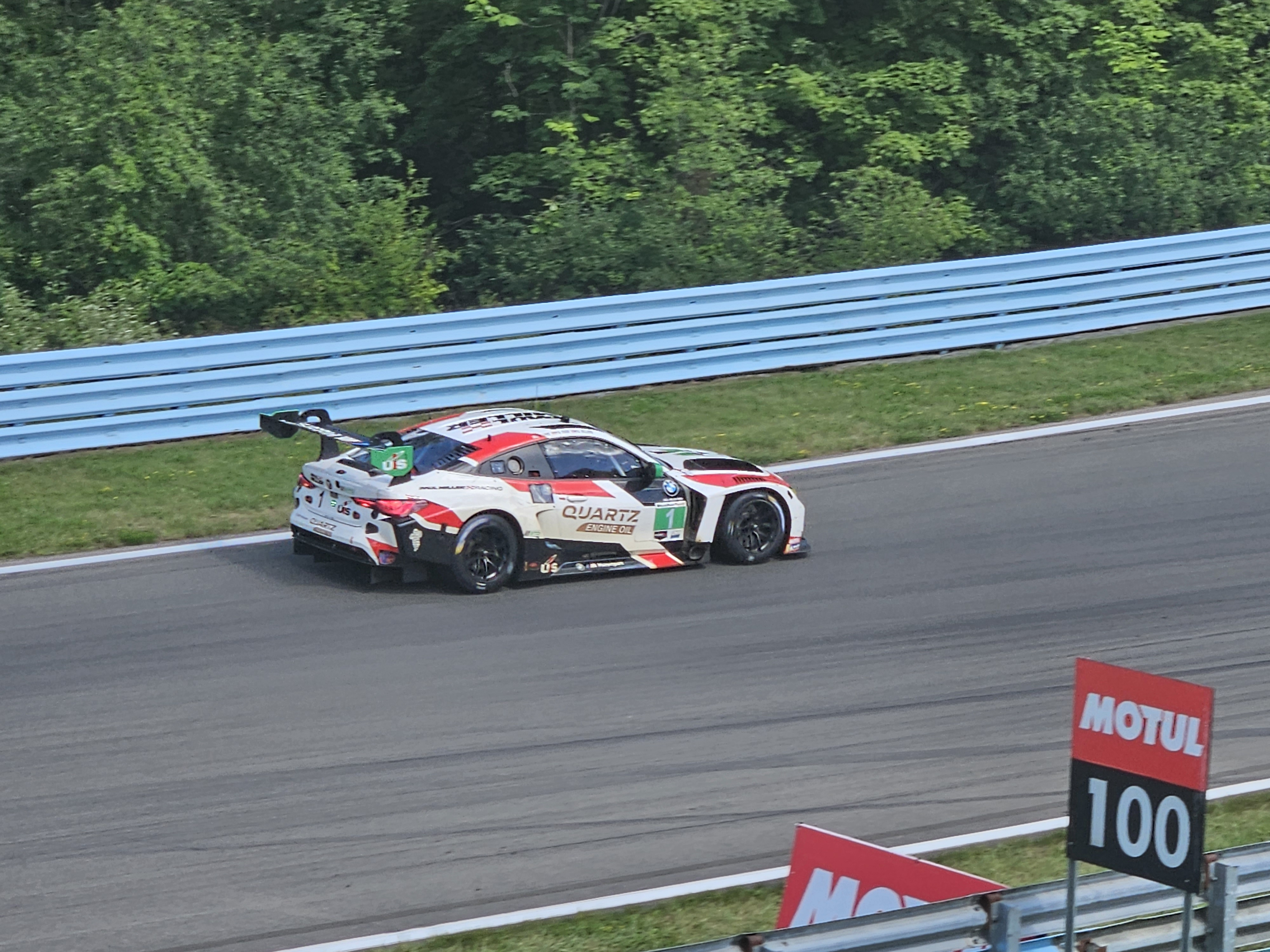
A BMW M4 GT3 GTD at Sahlen's Six Hours of the Glen.

A class active since 2016 that uses the same specification cars as GTD Pro, but with stricter driver requirements; at least one Silver or Bronze driver must be in a team and teams are limited to only one platinum driver per car.

== Former classes ==
There were five classes formerly used in the IMSA SportsCar Championship series, featuring four sports prototype categories and one grand tourer class.

=== Sports Prototype classes ===
==== Daytona Prototype International (DPi) ====
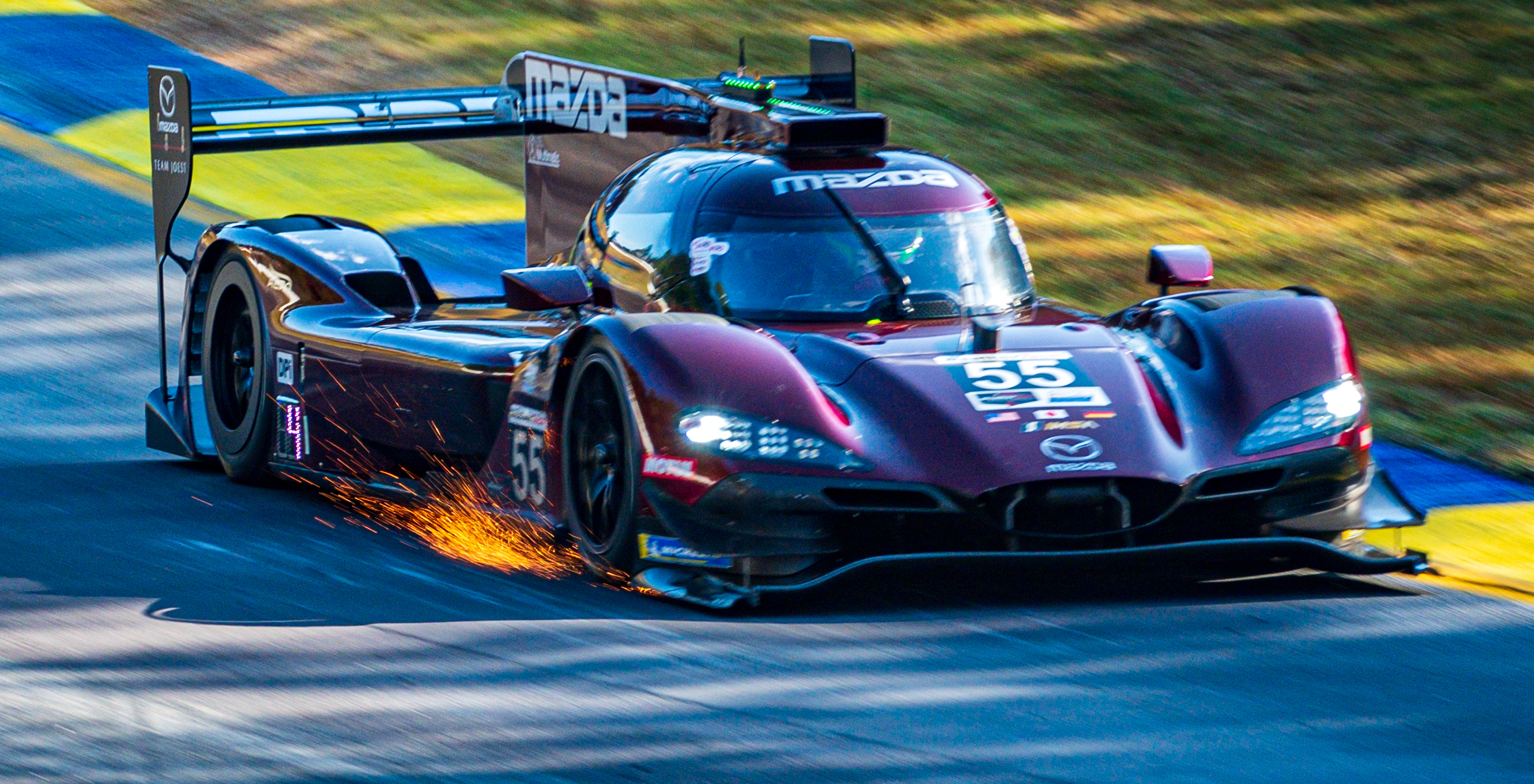
A Mazda RT24-P DPi at Petit Le Mans.

The former flagship class of the championship from 2019 to 2022, featuring cars built to IMSA's Daytona Prototype International regulations, which are based upon the 2017 Le Mans Prototype LMP2 cars. Previously, the DPi's had competed against their base LMP2 counterparts in the Prototype class from 2017 to 2018. Starting in 2019 the LMP2 cars were split into a separate class. The Prototype class had originally consisted of Grand-Am's Daytona Prototypes with the American Le Mans Series LMP2 prototypes, and the DeltaWing, before the original Daytona Prototypes, and the DeltaWing were phased out of competition at the end of 2016, and replaced by the new DPi cars. Starting in 2023, the DPi class was replaced by the GTP class in an effort to further improve the racing in the Prototype class, as well as create a closer bond to the FIA World Endurance Championship.

==== Prototype (P) ====
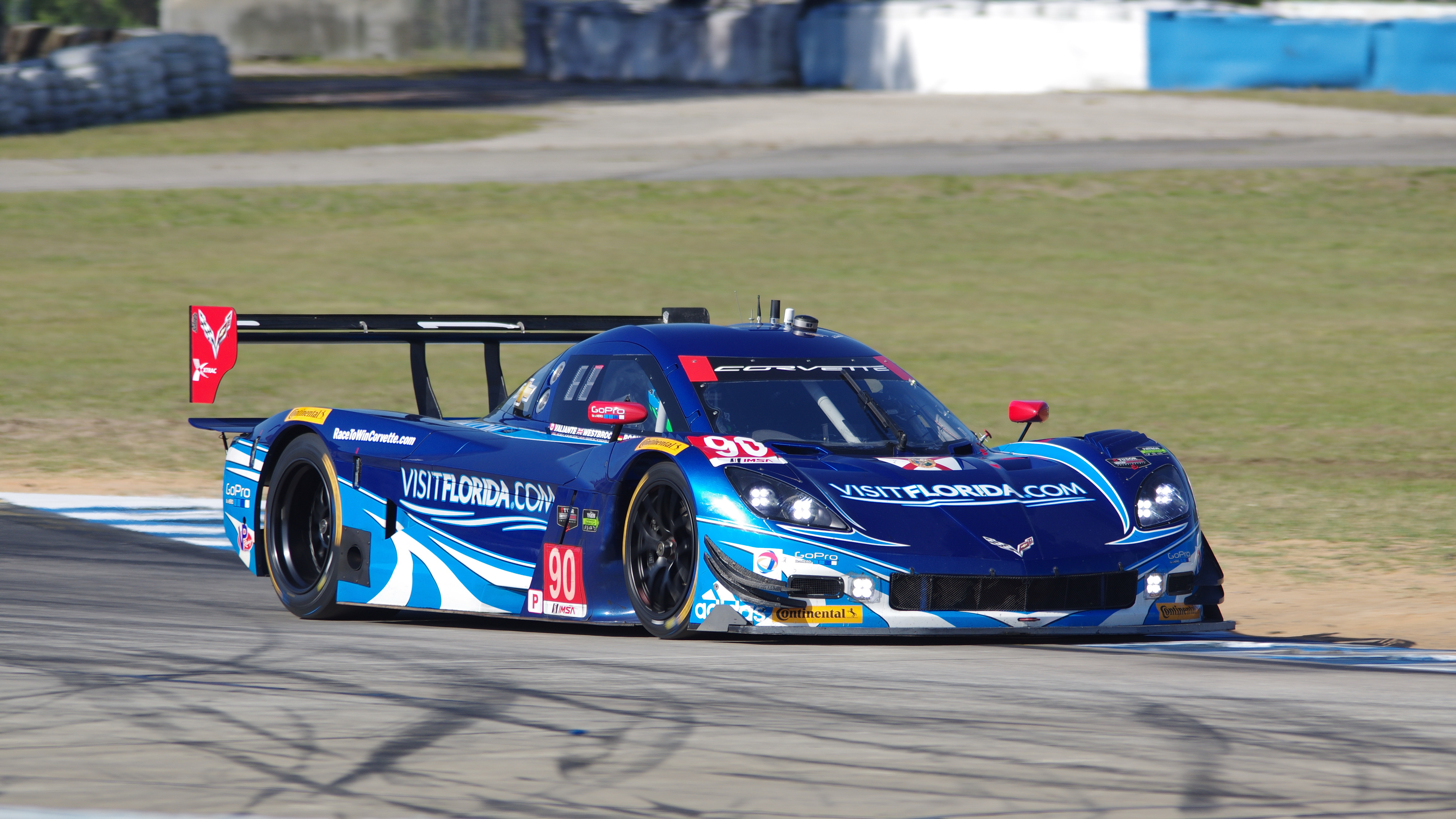
A Coyote Corvette DP Prototype at Mobil 1 Twelve Hours of Sebring.

The former flagship class of the championship from 2014 to 2018 before splitting into two separate classes in 2019, featuring cars built to which included classes of prototypes carried over from the previous motorsport category series of the American Le Mans Series and the Grand-Am Rolex Sports Car Series. These cars were Daytona Prototypes, LMP2 prototypes & the Nissan DeltaWing. Starting in 2017 the original Daytona Prototypes, and the DeltaWing were phased out of competition, and replaced by the new DPi cars. At the end of the 2018 WeatherTech SportsCar Championship season this class would be split into two separate classes, DPi & LMP2 for the following season in 2019.

==== Prototype Challenge (PC) ====
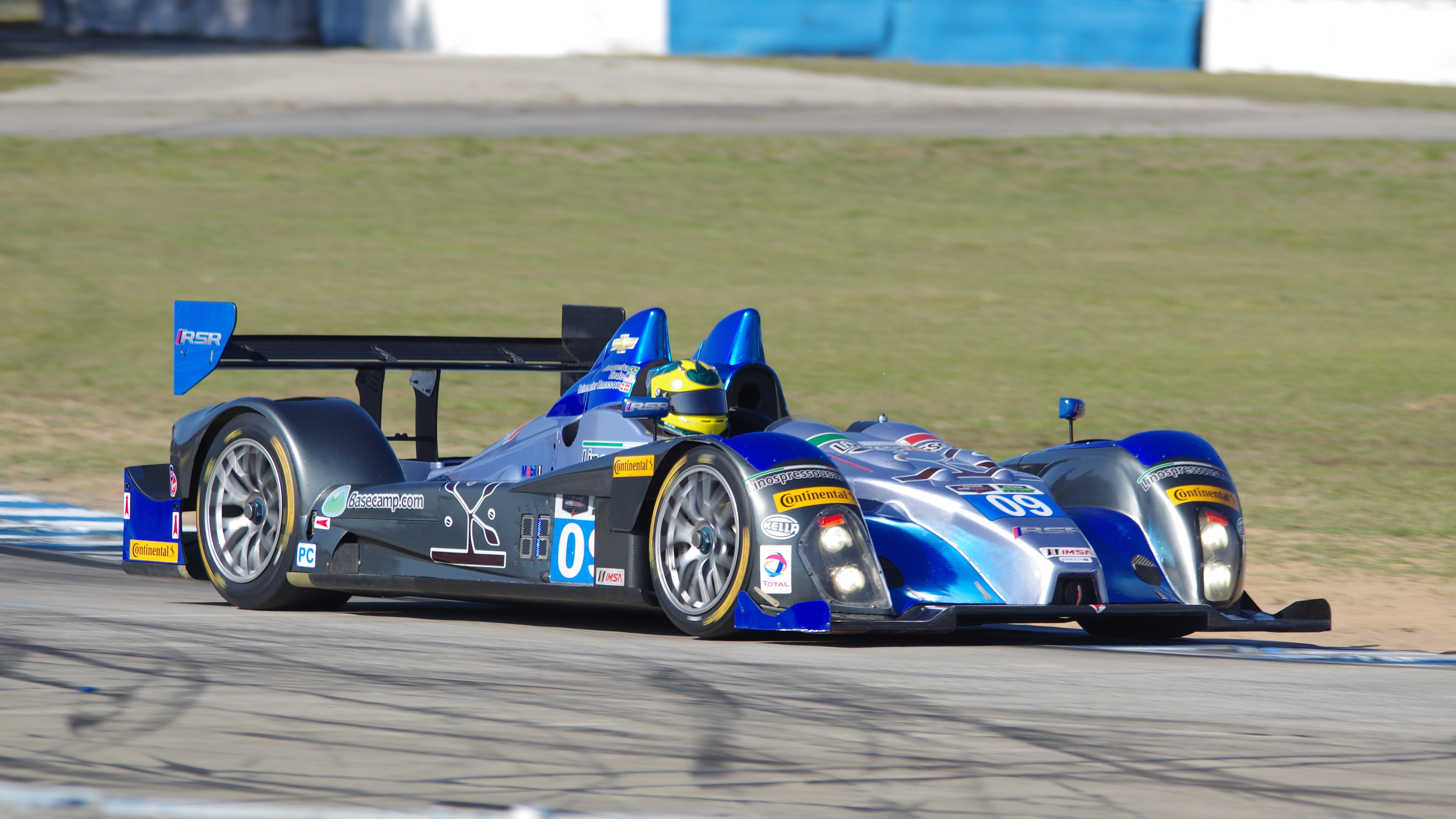
A Oreca FLM09 Prototype Challenge at Mobil 1 Twelve Hours of Sebring.

This was a one-make spec class in which all cars that drivers and teams used were Oreca FLM09 LMPC's powered by 6.2L Chevrolet V8 engines which made 430 hp each. This class would be used from the 2014 season until the end of the 2017 season.

==== Le Mans Prototype 3 (LMP3) ====
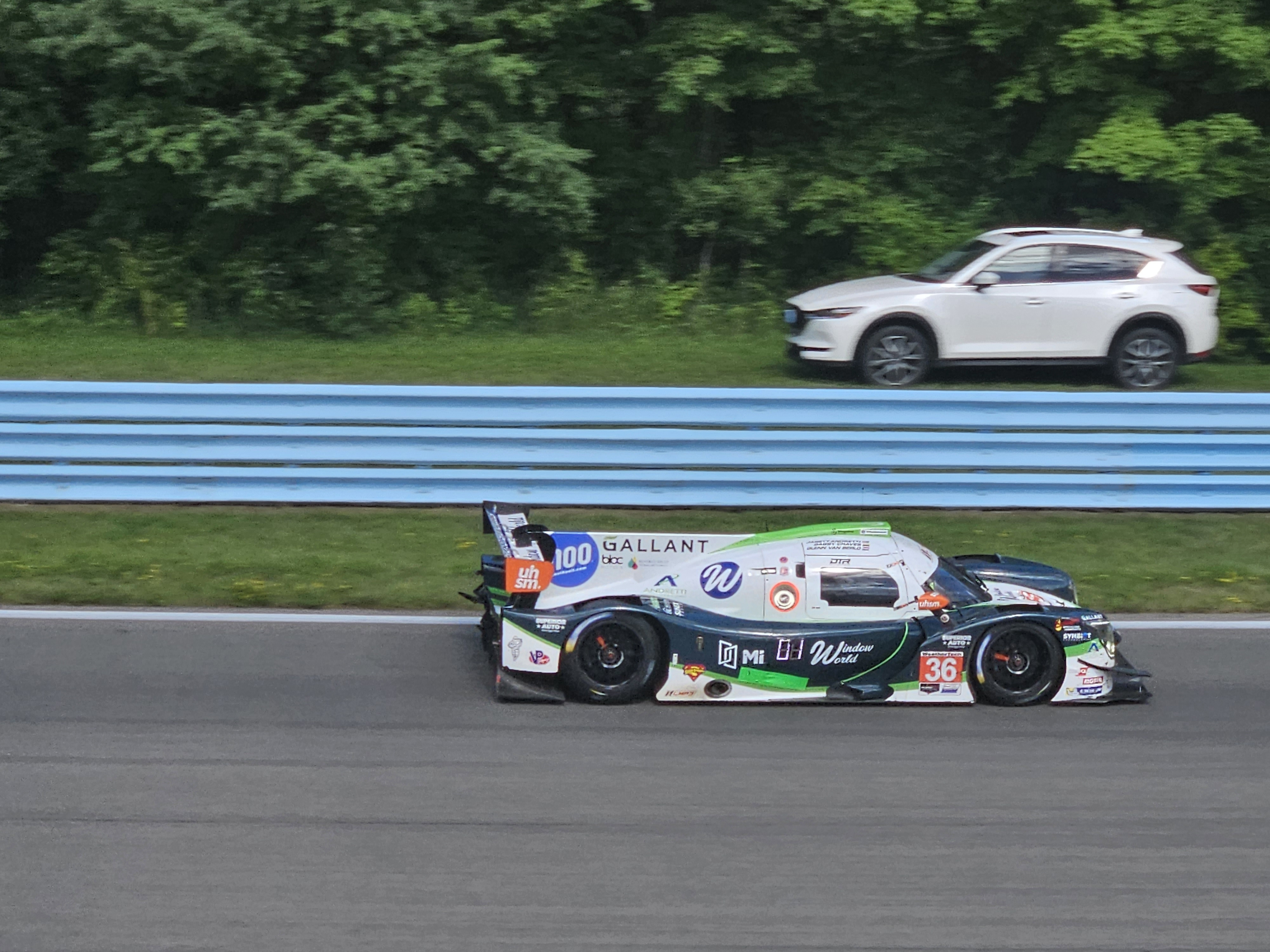
A Ligier JS P320 LMP3 at Sahlen's Six Hours of the Glen.

Introduced in the 2021 season, having been in the IMSA Prototype Challenge category as one of the feeder series to the IMSA WeatherTech SportsCar Championship, this class of prototypes features cars built according to ACO's 2020 LMP3 Generation II ruleset specifications from manufacturers such as Ligier, ADESS, Ginetta & Duqueine Engineering. The class was removed after the 2023 season due to the growth in grid sizes. LMP3s now race as part of the IMSA VP Racing SportsCar Challenge, a support series for the main IMSA championship.

=== Grand Touring classes ===
==== GT Le Mans (GTLM) ====
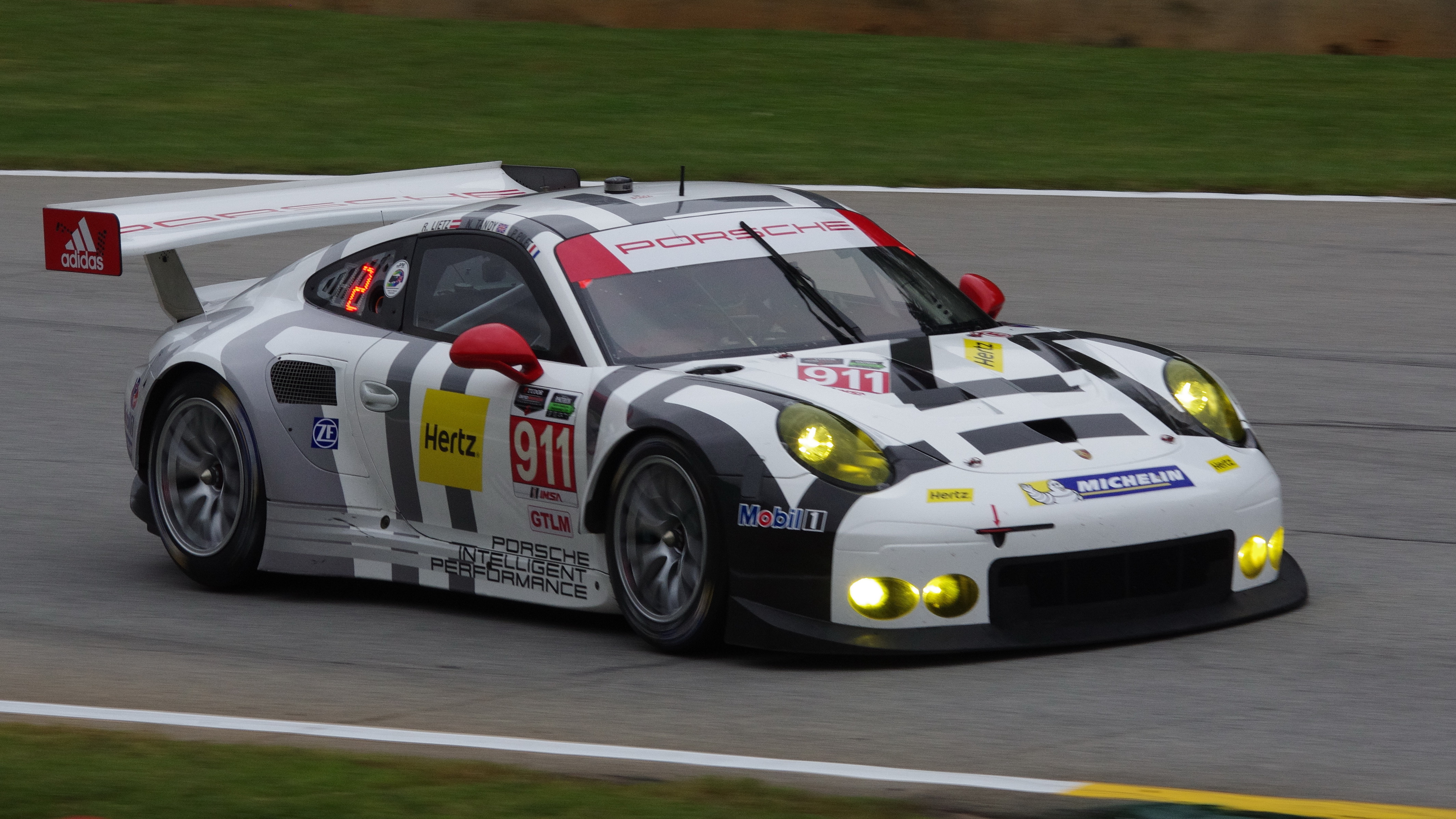
A Porsche 911 RSR GTLM at Petit Le Mans.

A continuation of the ALMS GT class, it consisted of cars matching the ACO's GTE specification and competed in the series between the 2014 and 2021 seasons.

== Circuits ==
Races in the IMSA WeatherTech SportsCar Championship as of 2025.
Red dots: current sprint circuits
Orange dots: current North American Endurance Cup circuits
Blue dots: former circuits

| Course | Years |
|---|---|
| Canadian Tire Motorsport Park | 2014–2019, 2022–present |
| Charlotte Motor Speedway | 2020 |
| Circuit of the Americas | 2014–2017 |
| Daytona International Speedway | 2014–present |
| Detroit Belle Isle Street Circuit | 2014–2019, 2021–2022 |
| Detroit Downtown Street Circuit | 2024–present |
| Indianapolis Motor Speedway | 2014, 2023–present |
| Kansas Speedway | 2014 |
| Lime Rock Park | 2015–2019, 2021–2023 |
| Long Beach Street Circuit | 2014–2019, 2021–present |
| Michelin Raceway Road Atlanta | 2014–present |
| Mid-Ohio Sports Car Course | 2018–2022 |
| Road America | 2014–present |
| Sebring International Raceway | 2014–present |
| Virginia International Raceway | 2014–present |
| Watkins Glen International | 2014–2019, 2021–present |
| WeatherTech Raceway Laguna Seca | 2014–present |

== Champions ==
=== Drivers ===
| Season | P | PC | GTLM | GTD | |
|---|---|---|---|---|---|
| 2014 | (Portugal) João Barbosa (Brazil) Christian Fittipaldi | (United States) Jon Bennett (United States) Colin Braun | (Canada) Kuno Wittmer | (United States) Dane Cameron | |
| 2015 | (Portugal) João Barbosa (Brazil) Christian Fittipaldi | (United States) Jon Bennett (United States) Colin Braun | (France) Patrick Pilet | (United States) Townsend Bell (United States) Bill Sweedler | |
| 2016 | (United States) Dane Cameron (United States) Eric Curran | (Venezuela) Alex Popow (Netherlands) Renger van der Zande | (United Kingdom) Oliver Gavin (United States) Tommy Milner | (Italy) Alessandro Balzan (Denmark) Christina Nielsen | |
| 2017 | (United States) Jordan Taylor (United States) Ricky Taylor | (United States) James French (Mexico) Patricio O'Ward | (Spain) Antonio García (Denmark) Jan Magnussen | (Italy) Alessandro Balzan (Denmark) Christina Nielsen | |
| 2018 | (United States) Eric Curran (Brazil) Felipe Nasr | Not held | (Spain) Antonio García (Denmark) Jan Magnussen | (United States) Bryan Sellers (United States) Madison Snow | |
| Season | DPi | LMP2 | GTLM | GTD | |
| 2019 | (United States) Dane Cameron (Colombia) Juan Pablo Montoya | (United States) Matt McMurry | (New Zealand) Earl Bamber (Belgium) Laurens Vanthoor | (Germany) Mario Farnbacher (United States) Trent Hindman | |
| 2020 | (United States) Ricky Taylor (Brazil) Hélio Castroneves | (United States) Patrick Kelly | (Spain) Antonio García (United States) Jordan Taylor | (Germany) Mario Farnbacher (United States) Matt McMurry | |
| Season | DPi | LMP2 | LMP3 | GTLM | GTD |
| 2021 | (Brazil) Pipo Derani (Brazil) Felipe Nasr | (United States) Ben Keating (Denmark) Mikkel Jensen | (United States) Gar Robinson | (Spain) Antonio García (United States) Jordan Taylor | (Canada) Zacharie Robichon (Belgium) Laurens Vanthoor |
| Season | DPi | LMP2 | LMP3 | GTD Pro | GTD |
| 2022 | (United Kingdom) Oliver Jarvis (United Kingdom) Tom Blomqvist | (Canada) John Farano | (United States) Jon Bennett (United States) Colin Braun | (Australia) Matt Campbell (France) Mathieu Jaminet | (Canada) Roman De Angelis |
| Season | GTP | LMP2 | LMP3 | GTD Pro | GTD |
| 2023 | (Brazil) Pipo Derani (United Kingdom) Alexander Sims | (United States) Ben Keating (France) Paul-Loup Chatin | (United States) Gar Robinson | (United Kingdom) Jack Hawksworth (United Kingdom) Ben Barnicoat | (United States) Bryan Sellers (United States) Madison Snow |
| Season | GTP | LMP2 | GTD Pro | GTD | |
| 2024 | (Brazil) Felipe Nasr (United States) Dane Cameron | (France) Tom Dillmann (United States) Nick Boulle | (Germany) Laurin Heinrich | (Switzerland) Philip Ellis (United States) Russell Ward | |
| 2025 | (Australia) Matt Campbell (France) Mathieu Jaminet | (United States) P.J. Hyett (United States) Dane Cameron | (Spain) Antonio García (United Kingdom) Alexander Sims | (Switzerland) Philip Ellis (United States) Russell Ward | |
| 2026 | (United Kingdom) Jack Aitken | (United States) George Kurtz (United Kingdom) Alex Quinn | (United States) Connor De Phillippi (United States) Neil Verhagen | (Switzerland) Philip Ellis (United States) Russell Ward | |

=== Teams ===
| Season | P | PC | GTLM | GTD | |
|---|---|---|---|---|---|
| 2014 | (United States) #5 Action Express Racing | (United States) #54 CORE Autosport | (United States) #93 SRT Motorsports | (United States) #94 Turner Motorsport | |
| 2015 | (United States) #5 Action Express Racing | (United States) #54 CORE Autosport | (Germany) #911 Porsche North America | (United States) #63 Scuderia Corsa | |
| 2016 | (United States) #31 Action Express Racing | (United States) #8 Starworks Motorsport | (United States) #4 Corvette Racing | (United States) #63 Scuderia Corsa | |
| 2017 | (United States) #10 Wayne Taylor Racing | (United States) #38 Performance Tech Motorsports | (United States) #3 Corvette Racing | (United States) #63 Scuderia Corsa | |
| 2018 | (United States) #31 Whelen Engineering Racing | Not held | (United States) #3 Corvette Racing | (United States) #48 Paul Miller Racing | |
| Season | DPi | LMP2 | GTLM | GTD | |
| 2019 | (United States) #6 Acura Team Penske | (United States) #52 PR1/Mathiasen Motorsports | (Germany) #912 Porsche GT Team | (United States) #86 Meyer Shank Racing with Curb-Agajanian | |
| 2020 | (United States) #7 Acura Team Penske | (United States) #52 PR1/Mathiasen Motorsports | (United States) #3 Corvette Racing | (United States) #86 Meyer Shank Racing with Curb-Agajanian | |
| Season | DPi | LMP2 | LMP3 | GTLM | GTD |
| 2021 | (United States) #31 Whelen Engineering Racing | (United States) #52 PR1/Mathiasen Motorsports | (United States) #74 Riley Motorsports | (United States) #3 Corvette Racing | (Canada) #9 Pfaff Motorsports |
| Season | DPi | LMP2 | LMP3 | GTD Pro | GTD |
| 2022 | (United States) #60 Meyer Shank Racing with Curb-Agajanian | (United States) #8 Tower Motorsports | (United States) #54 CORE Autosport | (Canada) #9 Pfaff Motorsports | (United States) #27 The Heart of Racing |
| Season | GTP | LMP2 | LMP3 | GTD Pro | GTD |
| 2023 | (United States) #31 Whelen Engineering Racing | (United States) #52 PR1/Mathiasen Motorsports | (United States) #74 Riley Motorsports | (United States) #14 Vasser Sullivan | (United States) #1 Paul Miller Racing |
| Season | GTP | LMP2 | GTD Pro | GTD | |
| 2024 | (Germany) #7 Porsche Penske Motorsport | (Poland) #52 Inter Europol by PR1/Mathiasen Motorsports | (United States) #77 AO Racing | (United States) #57 Winward Racing | |
| 2025 | (Germany) #6 Porsche Penske Motorsport | (United States) #99 AO Racing | (United States) #3 Corvette Racing by Pratt Miller Motorsports | (United States) #57 Winward Racing | |
| 2026 | (United States) #31 Cadillac Whelen | (Portugal) #04 CrowdStrike Racing by APR | (United States) #1 Paul Miller Racing | (United States) #57 Winward Racing | |

=== Manufacturers ===
| Season | P | GTLM | GTD |
|---|---|---|---|
| 2014 | (United States) Chevrolet | (Germany) Porsche | (Germany) Porsche |
| 2015 | (United States) Chevrolet | (Germany) Porsche | (Italy) Ferrari |
| 2016 | (United States) Chevrolet | (United States) Chevrolet | (Germany) Audi |
| 2017 | (United States) Cadillac | (United States) Chevrolet | (Italy) Ferrari |
| 2018 | (United States) Cadillac | (United States) Ford | (Italy) Lamborghini |
| Season | DPi | GTLM | GTD |
| 2019 | (Japan) Acura | (Germany) Porsche | (Italy) Lamborghini |
| 2020 | (Japan) Acura | (United States) Chevrolet | (Japan) Acura |
| 2021 | (United States) Cadillac | (United States) Chevrolet | (Germany) Porsche |
| Season | DPi | GTD Pro | GTD |
| 2022 | (Japan) Acura | (Germany) Porsche | (Germany) BMW |
| Season | GTP | GTD Pro | GTD |
| 2023 | (United States) Cadillac | (Japan) Lexus | (Germany) BMW |
| 2024 | (Germany) Porsche | (Germany) Porsche | (Germany) Mercedes-AMG |
| 2025 | (Germany) Porsche | (United States) Chevrolet | (Germany) Mercedes-AMG |
| 2026 | (United States) Cadillac | (United States) Chevrolet | (Germany) Mercedes-AMG |

== See also ==
- World Sportscar Championship
- FIA World Endurance Championship
- SCCA National Sports Car Championship
- United States Road Racing Championship
- IMSA GT Championship
- Grand-Am Road Racing
- Rolex Sports Car Series
- American Le Mans Series
- Asian Le Mans Series
- European Le Mans Series
