= 2021–22 Le Mans Virtual Series =

The 2021–22 Le Mans Virtual Series was the first season of the Le Mans Virtual Series which is an Esports endurance series. The five-event season began at the Autodromo Nazionale di Monza on 25 September 2021 and finished at the Circuit de la Sarthe for the 24 Hours of Le Mans Virtual on 15–16 January 2022 which took place at Studio Gabriel, in Paris, France.

The series is open for Le Mans Prototype (LMP2) and Le Mans Grand Touring Endurance (LMGTE) classes.

== Calendar ==
Round	Race	Circuit	Location	Date
1	4 Hours of Monza	(Italy) Autodromo Nazionale di Monza	Monza, Italy	25 September 2021
2	6 Hours of Spa-Francorchamps	(Belgium) Circuit de Spa-Francorchamps	Spa, Belgium	16 October 2021
3	8 Hours of Nürburgring	(Germany) Nürburgring	Nürburg, Germany	13 November 2021
4	Sebring 500	(United States) Sebring International Raceway	Sebring, Florida, United States	18 December 2021
5	24 Hours of Le Mans Virtual	(France) Circuit de la Sarthe	Le Mans, France	15–16 January 2022

== Entries ==
The entry list was divided into two categories of vehicles: LMP2 and GTE. There are 21 teams in the LMP class and 17 in the GTE category.

Pro Drivers
Sim Drivers

=== LMP2 ===
All cars in the LMP2 class used the Gibson GK428 V8 engine.

Entrant/Team	Chassis	No.	Drivers	Rounds
(Switzerland) (United Arab Emirates) / Rebellion GPX Williams (Note: Car No. 1 entered as Rebellion GPX Williams and car No. 22 entered as GPX Rebellion Williams.); (Switzerland) (United Arab Emirates) / GPX Rebellion Williams	Oreca 07	1	(Poland) Kuba Brzezinski	All
(Switzerland) (United Arab Emirates) / Rebellion GPX Williams; (Switzerland) (United Arab Emirates) / GPX Rebellion Williams	Oreca 07	1	(Poland) Nikodem Wisniewski	All
(Switzerland) (United Arab Emirates) / Rebellion GPX Williams; (Switzerland) (United Arab Emirates) / GPX Rebellion Williams	Oreca 07	1	(Switzerland) Louis Delétraz	1–2, 5
(Switzerland) (United Arab Emirates) / Rebellion GPX Williams; (Switzerland) (United Arab Emirates) / GPX Rebellion Williams	Oreca 07	1	(Italy) Raffaele Marciello	3
(Switzerland) (United Arab Emirates) / Rebellion GPX Williams; (Switzerland) (United Arab Emirates) / GPX Rebellion Williams	Oreca 07	1	(Argentina) Agustín Canapino	4–5
(Switzerland) (United Arab Emirates) / Rebellion GPX Williams; (Switzerland) (United Arab Emirates) / GPX Rebellion Williams	Oreca 07	22	(Hungary) Marcell Csincsik	All
(Switzerland) (United Arab Emirates) / Rebellion GPX Williams; (Switzerland) (United Arab Emirates) / GPX Rebellion Williams	Oreca 07	22	(Czech Republic) Jiri Toman	All
(Switzerland) (United Arab Emirates) / Rebellion GPX Williams; (Switzerland) (United Arab Emirates) / GPX Rebellion Williams	Oreca 07	22	(China) Ye Yifei	1–2, 5
(Switzerland) (United Arab Emirates) / Rebellion GPX Williams; (Switzerland) (United Arab Emirates) / GPX Rebellion Williams	Oreca 07	22	(United Kingdom) Jack Aitken	3
(Switzerland) (United Arab Emirates) / Rebellion GPX Williams; (Switzerland) (United Arab Emirates) / GPX Rebellion Williams	Oreca 07	22	(United Kingdom) David Pittard	4
(Switzerland) (United Arab Emirates) / Rebellion GPX Williams; (Switzerland) (United Arab Emirates) / GPX Rebellion Williams	Oreca 07	22	(Argentina) Néstor Girolami	5
(United Kingdom) Williams eSports	Oreca 07	5	(Croatia) Petar Brljak	All
(United Kingdom) Williams eSports	Oreca 07	5	(Spain) Alex Arana	1–2
(United Kingdom) Williams eSports	Oreca 07	5	(Argentina) Néstor Girolami	1
(United Kingdom) Williams eSports	Oreca 07	5	(Belgium) Jarno D'Hauw	2–4
(United Kingdom) Williams eSports	Oreca 07	5	(Italy) Moreno Sirica	3–5
(United Kingdom) Williams eSports	Oreca 07	5	(Hungary) Attila Tassi	5
(United Kingdom) Williams eSports	Oreca 07	5	(Greece) Michael Romanidis	5
(United Kingdom) Team Rocket Simsport	Oreca 07	2	(Germany) Devin Braune	1–3, 5
(United Kingdom) Team Rocket Simsport	Oreca 07	2	(United Kingdom) Alex Buncombe	All
(United Kingdom) Team Rocket Simsport	Oreca 07	2	(Germany) Jan von der Heyde	1, 3–5
(United Kingdom) Team Rocket Simsport	Oreca 07	2	(United Kingdom) Matt Richards	2, 4
(United Kingdom) Team Rocket Simsport	Oreca 07	2	(Germany) Marc Gassner	5
(Austria) / Floyd ByKolles – Burst eSport (Note: Car No. 4 entered as Floyd ByKolles – Burst eSport and car No. 444 entered as Alpha Ind. ByKolles – Burst.); (Austria) / Alpha Ind. ByKolles – Burst eSport	Oreca 07	4	(Denmark) Jesper Pedersen	All
(Austria) / Floyd ByKolles – Burst eSport; (Austria) / Alpha Ind. ByKolles – Burst eSport	Oreca 07	4	(Slovenia) Jerernej Simončič	All
(Austria) / Floyd ByKolles – Burst eSport; (Austria) / Alpha Ind. ByKolles – Burst eSport	Oreca 07	4	(Brazil) Sérgio Sette Câmara	1
(Austria) / Floyd ByKolles – Burst eSport; (Austria) / Alpha Ind. ByKolles – Burst eSport	Oreca 07	4	(France) Tom Dillmann	2–5
(Austria) / Floyd ByKolles – Burst eSport; (Austria) / Alpha Ind. ByKolles – Burst eSport	Oreca 07	4	(Netherlands) Bent Viscaal	5
(Austria) / Floyd ByKolles – Burst eSport; (Austria) / Alpha Ind. ByKolles – Burst eSport	Oreca 07	444	(Germany) Michi Hoyer	All
(Austria) / Floyd ByKolles – Burst eSport; (Austria) / Alpha Ind. ByKolles – Burst eSport	Oreca 07	444	(Poland) Dawid Mroczek	All
(Austria) / Floyd ByKolles – Burst eSport; (Austria) / Alpha Ind. ByKolles – Burst eSport	Oreca 07	444	(South Africa) Jonathan Aberdein	1
(Austria) / Floyd ByKolles – Burst eSport; (Austria) / Alpha Ind. ByKolles – Burst eSport	Oreca 07	444	(Netherlands) Bent Viscaal	2–4
(Austria) / Floyd ByKolles – Burst eSport; (Austria) / Alpha Ind. ByKolles – Burst eSport	Oreca 07	444	(Brazil) Sérgio Sette Câmara	5
(Austria) / Floyd ByKolles – Burst eSport; (Austria) / Alpha Ind. ByKolles – Burst eSport	Oreca 07	444	(Denmark) Lucas Ditlev Daugaard	5
(France) R8G Esports Team	Oreca 07	8	(North Macedonia) Erhan Jajovski	All
(France) R8G Esports Team	Oreca 07	8	(United Kingdom) Gordon Mutch	1–4
(France) R8G Esports Team	Oreca 07	8	(Netherlands) Hany Alsabti	1–3
(France) R8G Esports Team	Oreca 07	8	(United Kingdom) Isaac Price	4–5
(France) R8G Esports Team	Oreca 07	8	(Australia) Scott Andrews	5
(France) R8G Esports Team	Oreca 07	8	(Switzerland) Mathias Beche	5
(France) R8G Esports Team	Oreca 07	18	(France) Thibault Cazaubon	All
(France) R8G Esports Team	Oreca 07	18	(France) Thomas Petitjean	1
(France) R8G Esports Team	Oreca 07	18	(Netherlands) Job van Uitert	1, 5
(France) R8G Esports Team	Oreca 07	18	(Estonia) Risto Kappet	2–5
(France) R8G Esports Team	Oreca 07	18	(France) Arthur Rougier	2–5
(Germany) Mahle Racing Team	Oreca 07	10	(Italy) Michele D'Alessandro	All
(Germany) Mahle Racing Team	Oreca 07	10	(United Kingdom) Muhammed Patel	All
(Germany) Mahle Racing Team	Oreca 07	10	(Netherlands) Beitske Visser	1, 5
(Germany) Mahle Racing Team	Oreca 07	10	(United States) Phillipe Denes	2–5
(Austria) Red Bull Racing Esports	Oreca 07	11	(Germany) Dennis Jordan	All
(Austria) Red Bull Racing Esports	Oreca 07	11	(Germany) Alex Siebel	1–4
(Austria) Red Bull Racing Esports	Oreca 07	11	(Sweden) Timmy Hansen	1
(Austria) Red Bull Racing Esports	Oreca 07	11	(Australia) Jack Doohan	2
(Austria) Red Bull Racing Esports	Oreca 07	11	(New Zealand) Liam Lawson	3
(Austria) Red Bull Racing Esports	Oreca 07	11	(Australia) Cooper Webster	4–5
(Austria) Red Bull Racing Esports	Oreca 07	11	(Hungary) Norbert Kiss	5
(Austria) Red Bull Racing Esports	Oreca 07	11	(Denmark) Frederik Rasmussen	5
(France) / Race Clutch Alpine (Note: Car No. 14 entered as Race Clutch Alpine and Car No. 15 entered as Race Clutch Alpine from Rounds 1 to 4 and as Alpine ESports at Round 5, car No. 36 entered as Alpine Esports.); (France) / Alpine Esports	Oreca 07	14	(France) Tom Lartilleux	1–3, 5
(France) / Race Clutch Alpine; (France) / Alpine Esports	Oreca 07	14	(Peru) Nico Barclay	1, 4
(France) / Race Clutch Alpine; (France) / Alpine Esports	Oreca 07	14	(Poland) Nikodem Wierzbicki	1, 5
(France) / Race Clutch Alpine; (France) / Alpine Esports	Oreca 07	14	(United States) Rory MacDuff	2–5
(France) / Race Clutch Alpine; (France) / Alpine Esports	Oreca 07	14	(France) Paul-Adrien Pallot	2–5
(France) / Race Clutch Alpine; (France) / Alpine Esports	Oreca 07	15	(France) Romain Boeckler	All
(France) / Race Clutch Alpine; (France) / Alpine Esports	Oreca 07	15	(Spain) Borja Millan	1–4
(France) / Race Clutch Alpine; (France) / Alpine Esports	Oreca 07	15	(Netherlands) Rick Jonk	1
(France) / Race Clutch Alpine; (France) / Alpine Esports	Oreca 07	15	(France) Eneric André	2–5
(France) / Race Clutch Alpine; (France) / Alpine Esports	Oreca 07	15	(France) Antoine Doquin	5
(France) / Race Clutch Alpine; (France) / Alpine Esports	Oreca 07	15	(Hungary) Peter Zuba	5
(France) / Race Clutch Alpine; (France) / Alpine Esports	Oreca 07	36	(France) Sacha Lehmann	5
(France) / Race Clutch Alpine; (France) / Alpine Esports	Oreca 07	36	(France) Victor Martins	5
(France) / Race Clutch Alpine; (France) / Alpine Esports	Oreca 07	36	(Finland) Olli Pahkala	5
(France) / Race Clutch Alpine; (France) / Alpine Esports	Oreca 07	36	(Hungary) Patrik Sipos	5
(France) Pescarolo E-sport	Oreca 07	16	(France) Thomas Imbourg	5
(France) Pescarolo E-sport	Oreca 07	16	(France) Bruce Jouanny	5
(France) Pescarolo E-sport	Oreca 07	16	(France) Adrien Tambay	5
(France) Pescarolo E-sport	Oreca 07	16	(France) Quentin Vialatte	5
(Malaysia) Axle Motorsport	Oreca 07	21	(Malaysia) Naquib Azlan	All
(Malaysia) Axle Motorsport	Oreca 07	21	(Australia) Josh Purwien	All
(Malaysia) Axle Motorsport	Oreca 07	21	(Malaysia) Mika Hakimi	1
(Malaysia) Axle Motorsport	Oreca 07	21	(Singapore) Ar Muhammad Aleef	2–5
(Malaysia) Axle Motorsport	Oreca 07	21	(Philippines) Iñígo Anton	5
(United Kingdom) LMVS Guest Car	Oreca 07	24	(Italy) Luca D'Amelio	5
(United Kingdom) LMVS Guest Car	Oreca 07	24	(Sweden) Christopher Högfeldt	5
(United Kingdom) LMVS Guest Car	Oreca 07	24	(Colombia) Juan Pablo Montoya	5
(United Kingdom) LMVS Guest Car	Oreca 07	24	(Colombia) Sebastián Montoya	5
(United Kingdom) Veloce Esports	Oreca 07	28	(United Kingdom) James Baldwin	5
(United Kingdom) Veloce Esports	Oreca 07	28	(United Kingdom) Michael Epps	5
(United Kingdom) Veloce Esports	Oreca 07	28	(Netherlands) Isaac Gillissen	5
(United Kingdom) Veloce Esports	Oreca 07	28	(Republic of Ireland) Eamonn Murphy	5
Mexico Racing Team	Oreca 07	29	(Mexico) Alberto Gironella	5
Mexico Racing Team	Oreca 07	29	(Mexico) Benito Guerra Jr.	5
Mexico Racing Team	Oreca 07	29	(Mexico) Alejandro de Alba Márquez	5
Mexico Racing Team	Oreca 07	29	(Mexico) Memo Rojas	5
(France) Duqueine/PRiMA Esports	Oreca 07	30	(France) Gabriel Aubry	5
(France) Duqueine/PRiMA Esports	Oreca 07	30	(France) Léo Boulay	5
(France) Duqueine/PRiMA Esports	Oreca 07	30	(France) Maxime Delpech	5
(France) Duqueine/PRiMA Esports	Oreca 07	30	(France) Arnaud Lacombe	5
(Belgium) Team WRT SIMTAG Esports	Oreca 07	31	(Belgium) Arne Schoonvliet	1–2
(Belgium) Team WRT SIMTAG Esports	Oreca 07	31	(Belgium) Marco Schendel	1
(Belgium) Team WRT SIMTAG Esports	Oreca 07	31	(Denmark) Lasse Sørensen	1
(Belgium) Team WRT SIMTAG Esports	Oreca 07	31	(Belgium) Fabrice Cornelis	2–5
(Belgium) Team WRT SIMTAG Esports	Oreca 07	31	(Japan) Ryuichiro Tomita	2, 4–5
(Belgium) Team WRT SIMTAG Esports	Oreca 07	31	(Germany) Benjamin Gielczynski	3–5
(Belgium) Team WRT SIMTAG Esports	Oreca 07	31	(Argentina) Franco Colapinto	3, 5
(United Kingdom) Jota	Oreca 07	38	(United Kingdom) Ibraheem Khan	1–3, 5
(United Kingdom) Jota	Oreca 07	38	(United Kingdom) Mike Epps	1–3
(United Kingdom) Jota	Oreca 07	38	(Indonesia) Ferris Stanley	1, 4–5
(United Kingdom) Jota	Oreca 07	38	(Hungary) Daniel Kiss	2–4
(United Kingdom) Jota	Oreca 07	38	(Malaysia) Mika Hakimi	4–5
(United Kingdom) Jota	Oreca 07	38	(United Kingdom) Jordan Albert	5
(France) GRAFF by ProSimu	Oreca 07	39	(France) Maxime Brient	5
(France) GRAFF by ProSimu	Oreca 07	39	(France) Vincent Capillaire	5
(France) GRAFF by ProSimu	Oreca 07	39	(France) Yohann Harth	5
(France) GRAFF by ProSimu	Oreca 07	39	(France) Maxime Robin	5
(Slovakia) ARC Bratislava	Oreca 07	44	(Slovakia) Dennis Zeťák	All
(Slovakia) ARC Bratislava	Oreca 07	44	(Slovakia) Dávid Nemček	1–3, 5
(Slovakia) ARC Bratislava	Oreca 07	44	(Slovakia) Jakub Štofko	1–2, 5
(Slovakia) ARC Bratislava	Oreca 07	44	(Slovakia) Andrej Marečák	3–4
(Slovakia) ARC Bratislava	Oreca 07	44	(Slovakia) Maťo Homola	4–5
(United Arab Emirates) YAS HEAT	Oreca 07	49	(United Kingdom) Josh Lad	1–4
(United Arab Emirates) YAS HEAT	Oreca 07	49	(Hungary) Balázs Remenyik	1–2, 5
(United Arab Emirates) YAS HEAT	Oreca 07	49	(United States) Ryan Tveter	1
(United Arab Emirates) YAS HEAT	Oreca 07	49	(United Kingdom) William Tregurtha	2, 5
(United Arab Emirates) YAS HEAT	Oreca 07	49	(United Kingdom) James Baldwin	3–4
(United Arab Emirates) YAS HEAT	Oreca 07	49	(Netherlands) Isaac Gillissen	3–4
(United Arab Emirates) YAS HEAT	Oreca 07	49	(United Kingdom) Sandy Mitchell	5
(United Arab Emirates) YAS HEAT	Oreca 07	49	(Germany) Marko Pejić	5
(France) Panis Racing	Oreca 07	65	(Italy) Alessandro Ottaviani	All
(France) Panis Racing	Oreca 07	65	(United Kingdom) Will Stevens	1–4
(France) Panis Racing	Oreca 07	65	(France) Valentin Mandernach	1
(France) Panis Racing	Oreca 07	65	(Germany) Tobias Pfeffer	2–4
(France) Panis Racing	Oreca 07	65	(Brazil) Gustavo Ariel	5
(France) Panis Racing	Oreca 07	65	(Italy) Gabriele Minì	5
(France) Panis Racing	Oreca 07	65	(Argentina) Nicolás Varrone	5
(Germany) Mercedes-AMG Petronas Esports	Oreca 07	67	(United Kingdom) Ross Gunn	5
(Germany) Mercedes-AMG Petronas Esports	Oreca 07	67	(Netherlands) Bono Huis	5
(Germany) Mercedes-AMG Petronas Esports	Oreca 07	67	(Spain) Daniel Juncadella	5
(Germany) Mercedes-AMG Petronas Esports	Oreca 07	67	(Netherlands) Jarno Opmeer	5
(Switzerland) Realteam Hydrogen Redline	Oreca 07	70	(Netherlands) Jeffrey Rietveld	All
(Switzerland) Realteam Hydrogen Redline	Oreca 07	70	(Czech Republic) Michal Smidl	All
(Switzerland) Realteam Hydrogen Redline	Oreca 07	70	(Spain) Daniel Juncadella	1, 4
(Switzerland) Realteam Hydrogen Redline	Oreca 07	70	(Brazil) Caio Collet	2
(Switzerland) Realteam Hydrogen Redline	Oreca 07	70	(Brazil) Jeff Giassi	3
(Switzerland) Realteam Hydrogen Redline	Oreca 07	70	(Brazil) Felipe Drugovich	5
(Switzerland) Realteam Hydrogen Redline	Oreca 07	70	(United Kingdom) Oliver Rowland	5
(Luxembourg) Team Redline	Oreca 07	123	(Netherlands) Bono Huis	1–4
(Luxembourg) Team Redline	Oreca 07	123	(Netherlands) Atze Kerkhof	1–2, 4–5
(Luxembourg) Team Redline	Oreca 07	123	(Netherlands) Colin Caresani	1
(Luxembourg) Team Redline	Oreca 07	123	(Sweden) Felix Rosenqvist	2–5
(Luxembourg) Team Redline	Oreca 07	123	(Netherlands) Collin Spork	3
(Luxembourg) Team Redline	Oreca 07	123	(Germany) Maximilian Benecke	5
(Luxembourg) Team Redline	Oreca 07	123	(Netherlands) Max Verstappen	5
(United States) Team Fordzilla	Oreca 07	966	(Portugal) Nuno Pinto	All
(United States) Team Fordzilla	Oreca 07	966	(United Kingdom) Luke Browning	1–2, 5
(United States) Team Fordzilla	Oreca 07	966	(Italy) Gianmarco Fiduci	1, 4
(United States) Team Fordzilla	Oreca 07	966	(Spain) Pablo López Padín	2–3, 5
(United States) Team Fordzilla	Oreca 07	966	(Portugal) Rafael Lobato	3
(United States) Team Fordzilla	Oreca 07	966	(United States) Andre Castro	4
(United States) Team Fordzilla	Oreca 07	966	(Spain) Álex Palou	5

=== LMGTE ===
Entrant/Team	Chassis	Engine	No.	Drivers	Rounds
(China) Absolute Inspeed Racing	Porsche 911 RSR GTE	Porsche 4.0 L Flat-6	25	(United Kingdom) Johnathan Hoggard	5
(China) Absolute Inspeed Racing	Porsche 911 RSR GTE	Porsche 4.0 L Flat-6	25	(China) Li Xiayufei	5
(China) Absolute Inspeed Racing	Porsche 911 RSR GTE	Porsche 4.0 L Flat-6	25	(China) Li Yanzhe	5
(China) Absolute Inspeed Racing	Porsche 911 RSR GTE	Porsche 4.0 L Flat-6	25	(China) Lu Wenlong	5
(United Kingdom) W Series	BMW M8 GTE	BMW P63/1 4.0 L Turbo V8	45	(Norway) Ayla Ågren	5
(United Kingdom) W Series	BMW M8 GTE	BMW P63/1 4.0 L Turbo V8	45	(Australia) Emily Jones	5
(United Kingdom) W Series	BMW M8 GTE	BMW P63/1 4.0 L Turbo V8	45	(Kazakhstan) Lyubov Ozeretskovskaya	5
(United Kingdom) W Series	BMW M8 GTE	BMW P63/1 4.0 L Turbo V8	45	(Liechtenstein) Fabienne Wohlwend	5
(Italy) FDA Esports Team	Ferrari 488 GTE Evo	Ferrari F154CB 3.9L Turbo V8	51	(Netherlands) Jordy Zwiers	1–2, 4–5
(Italy) FDA Esports Team	Ferrari 488 GTE Evo	Ferrari F154CB 3.9L Turbo V8	51	(Denmark) Kasper Stoltze	1, 3–5
(Italy) FDA Esports Team	Ferrari 488 GTE Evo	Ferrari F154CB 3.9L Turbo V8	51	(Denmark) Nicklas Nielsen	1, 4–5
(Italy) FDA Esports Team	Ferrari 488 GTE Evo	Ferrari F154CB 3.9L Turbo V8	51	(South Africa) David Perel	2–3, 5
(Italy) FDA Esports Team	Ferrari 488 GTE Evo	Ferrari F154CB 3.9L Turbo V8	51	(Denmark) Martin Dyrlund	2
(United Kingdom) BMW Team GB	BMW M8 GTE	BMW P63/1 4.0 L Turbo V8	55	(United Kingdom) Jack Keithley	All
(United Kingdom) BMW Team GB	BMW M8 GTE	BMW P63/1 4.0 L Turbo V8	55	(Czech Republic) Martin Stefanko	All
(United Kingdom) BMW Team GB	BMW M8 GTE	BMW P63/1 4.0 L Turbo V8	55	(Finland) Sami-Matti Trogen	1, 3–5
(United Kingdom) BMW Team GB	BMW M8 GTE	BMW P63/1 4.0 L Turbo V8	55	(Argentina) Agustín Canapino	2
(United Kingdom) BMW Team GB	BMW M8 GTE	BMW P63/1 4.0 L Turbo V8	55	(Norway) Sindre Setsaas	5
(Germany) Team Project 1 x BPM	Porsche 911 RSR GTE	Porsche 4.0 L Flat-6	56	(Germany) Tim Neuendorf	All
(Germany) Team Project 1 x BPM	Porsche 911 RSR GTE	Porsche 4.0 L Flat-6	56	(Bulgaria) Peyo Stoyanov Peev	1–2
(Germany) Team Project 1 x BPM	Porsche 911 RSR GTE	Porsche 4.0 L Flat-6	56	(Germany) Nicolas Hillebrand	1
(Germany) Team Project 1 x BPM	Porsche 911 RSR GTE	Porsche 4.0 L Flat-6	56	(United Kingdom) Bradley Philpot	2
(Germany) Team Project 1 x BPM	Porsche 911 RSR GTE	Porsche 4.0 L Flat-6	56	(Netherlands) Bram Beelen	3–5
(Germany) Team Project 1 x BPM	Porsche 911 RSR GTE	Porsche 4.0 L Flat-6	56	(Germany) René Buttler	3–4
(Germany) Team Project 1 x BPM	Porsche 911 RSR GTE	Porsche 4.0 L Flat-6	56	(United Kingdom) Jimmy Broadbent	5
(Germany) Team Project 1 x BPM	Porsche 911 RSR GTE	Porsche 4.0 L Flat-6	56	(Germany) René Buttler	5
(Germany) Team Project 1 x BPM	Porsche 911 RSR GTE	Porsche 4.0 L Flat-6	57	(Poland) Zbigniew Siara	All
(Germany) Team Project 1 x BPM	Porsche 911 RSR GTE	Porsche 4.0 L Flat-6	57	(Netherlands) Bram Beelen	1–2
(Germany) Team Project 1 x BPM	Porsche 911 RSR GTE	Porsche 4.0 L Flat-6	57	(Germany) Nicolas Hillebrand	2–5
(Germany) Team Project 1 x BPM	Porsche 911 RSR GTE	Porsche 4.0 L Flat-6	57	(Germany) René Buttler	1
(Germany) Team Project 1 x BPM	Porsche 911 RSR GTE	Porsche 4.0 L Flat-6	57	(Bulgaria) Peyo Stoyanov Peev	3–5
(Germany) Team Project 1 x BPM	Porsche 911 RSR GTE	Porsche 4.0 L Flat-6	57	(Italy) Riccardo Pera	5
(Malaysia) Axle Motorsport	Porsche 911 RSR GTE	Porsche 4.0 L Flat-6	61	(Malaysia) Mikko Nassi	1–2
(Malaysia) Axle Motorsport	Porsche 911 RSR GTE	Porsche 4.0 L Flat-6	61	(Philippines) Inigo Anton	1, 3–4
(Malaysia) Axle Motorsport	Porsche 911 RSR GTE	Porsche 4.0 L Flat-6	61	(Malaysia) Alister Yoong	1, 3–5
(Malaysia) Axle Motorsport	Porsche 911 RSR GTE	Porsche 4.0 L Flat-6	61	(Italy) Davide Arduini	2, 5
(Malaysia) Axle Motorsport	Porsche 911 RSR GTE	Porsche 4.0 L Flat-6	61	(Malaysia) Amir Haziq	2
(Malaysia) Axle Motorsport	Porsche 911 RSR GTE	Porsche 4.0 L Flat-6	61	(Malaysia) Nabil Azlan	3, 5
(Malaysia) Axle Motorsport	Porsche 911 RSR GTE	Porsche 4.0 L Flat-6	61	(Australia) Cian Butler	4
(Malaysia) Axle Motorsport	Porsche 911 RSR GTE	Porsche 4.0 L Flat-6	61	(Indonesia) Avila Bahar	5
(United States) Satellite Racing	Chevrolet Corvette C8.R	Chevrolet 5.5 L V8	63	(Colombia) Gabby Chaves	5
(United States) Satellite Racing	Chevrolet Corvette C8.R	Chevrolet 5.5 L V8	63	(Finland) Jimi Nisula	5
(United States) Satellite Racing	Chevrolet Corvette C8.R	Chevrolet 5.5 L V8	63	(United States) Simon SIkes	5
(United States) Satellite Racing	Chevrolet Corvette C8.R	Chevrolet 5.5 L V8	63	(Estonia) Henri Sinik	5
(United Arab Emirates) SIMMSA Esports	Ferrari 488 GTE Evo	Ferrari F154CB 3.9L Turbo V8	66	(Germany) Armin Binder	All
(United Arab Emirates) SIMMSA Esports	Ferrari 488 GTE Evo	Ferrari F154CB 3.9L Turbo V8	66	(Lithuania) Gustas Grinbergas	1, 3–5
(United Arab Emirates) SIMMSA Esports	Ferrari 488 GTE Evo	Ferrari F154CB 3.9L Turbo V8	66	(Germany) Sebastian Wunsch	1, 5
(United Arab Emirates) SIMMSA Esports	Ferrari 488 GTE Evo	Ferrari F154CB 3.9L Turbo V8	66	(Canada) Ramez Azzam	2, 5
(United Arab Emirates) SIMMSA Esports	Ferrari 488 GTE Evo	Ferrari F154CB 3.9L Turbo V8	66	(Germany) Andreas Schmich	2–4
(Luxembourg) BMW Team Redline	BMW M8 GTE	BMW P63/1 4.0 L Turbo V8	71	(Italy) Enzo Bonito	All
(Luxembourg) BMW Team Redline	BMW M8 GTE	BMW P63/1 4.0 L Turbo V8	71	(Slovenia) Kevin Siggy	All
(Luxembourg) BMW Team Redline	BMW M8 GTE	BMW P63/1 4.0 L Turbo V8	71	(Brazil) Jeff Giassi	1
(Luxembourg) BMW Team Redline	BMW M8 GTE	BMW P63/1 4.0 L Turbo V8	71	(Netherlands) Rudy van Buren	2–5
(Luxembourg) BMW Team Redline	BMW M8 GTE	BMW P63/1 4.0 L Turbo V8	71	(Italy) Lorenzo Colombo	5
(Germany) Proton Competition	Porsche 911 RSR GTE	Porsche 4.0 L Flat-6	77	(France) Jeremy Bouteloup	All
(Germany) Proton Competition	Porsche 911 RSR GTE	Porsche 4.0 L Flat-6	77	(Belgium) Kevin van Dooren	All
(Germany) Proton Competition	Porsche 911 RSR GTE	Porsche 4.0 L Flat-6	77	(Netherlands) Loek Hartog	All
(Germany) Proton Competition	Porsche 911 RSR GTE	Porsche 4.0 L Flat-6	77	(Australia) Matt Campbell	5
(Germany) Proton Competition	Porsche 911 RSR GTE	Porsche 4.0 L Flat-6	88	(United Kingdom) Charlie Collins	All
(Germany) Proton Competition	Porsche 911 RSR GTE	Porsche 4.0 L Flat-6	88	(Luxembourg) Dylan Pereira	All
(Germany) Proton Competition	Porsche 911 RSR GTE	Porsche 4.0 L Flat-6	88	(Australia) Dayne Warren	All
(Germany) Proton Competition	Porsche 911 RSR GTE	Porsche 4.0 L Flat-6	88	(Norway) Sindre Furuseth	5
(United Kingdom) Prodrive E Sports	Aston Martin Vantage GTE	Aston Martin 4.0 L Turbo V8	84	(United Kingdom) Tom Canning	5
(United Kingdom) Prodrive E Sports	Aston Martin Vantage GTE	Aston Martin 4.0 L Turbo V8	84	(United Kingdom) Logan Hannah	5
(United Kingdom) Prodrive E Sports	Aston Martin Vantage GTE	Aston Martin 4.0 L Turbo V8	84	(United Kingdom) David Pittard	5
(United Kingdom) Prodrive E Sports	Aston Martin Vantage GTE	Aston Martin 4.0 L Turbo V8	84	(Denmark) Lasse Sørensen	5
(United Kingdom) GR Wolves Racing	Porsche 911 RSR GTE	Porsche 4.0 L Flat-6	86	(Republic of Ireland) Adam Maguire	All
(United Kingdom) GR Wolves Racing	Porsche 911 RSR GTE	Porsche 4.0 L Flat-6	86	(Australia) Nick Foster	1–2
(United Kingdom) GR Wolves Racing	Porsche 911 RSR GTE	Porsche 4.0 L Flat-6	86	(Netherlands) Liam de Waal	1, 3–5
(United Kingdom) GR Wolves Racing	Porsche 911 RSR GTE	Porsche 4.0 L Flat-6	86	(Finland) Turkka Häkkinen	2
(United Kingdom) GR Wolves Racing	Porsche 911 RSR GTE	Porsche 4.0 L Flat-6	86	(Australia) Bart Horsten	3–5
(United Kingdom) GR Wolves Racing	Porsche 911 RSR GTE	Porsche 4.0 L Flat-6	86	(United Kingdom) Ben Barker	5
(United Kingdom) GR Wolves Racing	Porsche 911 RSR GTE	Porsche 4.0 L Flat-6	87	(Germany) Philipp Puschke	1–3, 5
(United Kingdom) GR Wolves Racing	Porsche 911 RSR GTE	Porsche 4.0 L Flat-6	87	(United Kingdom) Chris McDade	1–2
(United Kingdom) GR Wolves Racing	Porsche 911 RSR GTE	Porsche 4.0 L Flat-6	87	(United Kingdom) Ben Barker	1
(United Kingdom) GR Wolves Racing	Porsche 911 RSR GTE	Porsche 4.0 L Flat-6	87	(Republic of Ireland) Ryan Cullen	2
(United Kingdom) GR Wolves Racing	Porsche 911 RSR GTE	Porsche 4.0 L Flat-6	87	(Finland) Turkka Häkkinen	3–4
(United Kingdom) GR Wolves Racing	Porsche 911 RSR GTE	Porsche 4.0 L Flat-6	87	(Belgium) Alessio Picariello	3
(United Kingdom) GR Wolves Racing	Porsche 911 RSR GTE	Porsche 4.0 L Flat-6	87	(Germany) Philipp Puschke	4
(United Kingdom) GR Wolves Racing	Porsche 911 RSR GTE	Porsche 4.0 L Flat-6	87	(Czech Republic) Vojta Polesny	4
(United Kingdom) GR Wolves Racing	Porsche 911 RSR GTE	Porsche 4.0 L Flat-6	87	(United Kingdom) Tom Gamble	5
(United Kingdom) GR Wolves Racing	Porsche 911 RSR GTE	Porsche 4.0 L Flat-6	87	(United Kingdom) Alex Malykhin	5
(Germany) BMW Team BS+Competition	BMW M8 GTE	BMW P63/1 4.0 L Turbo V8	89	(Finland) Joonas Raivio	All
(Germany) BMW Team BS+Competition	BMW M8 GTE	BMW P63/1 4.0 L Turbo V8	89	(Slovakia) Alen Terzic	All
(Germany) BMW Team BS+Competition	BMW M8 GTE	BMW P63/1 4.0 L Turbo V8	89	(Canada) Bruno Spengler	1, 4–5
(Germany) BMW Team BS+Competition	BMW M8 GTE	BMW P63/1 4.0 L Turbo V8	89	(Germany) Laurin Heinrich	2–3
(Germany) BMW Team BS+Competition	BMW M8 GTE	BMW P63/1 4.0 L Turbo V8	89	(United States) Robby Foley	5
(Germany) Porsche Esports Team	Porsche 911 RSR GTE	Porsche 4.0 L Flat-6	91	(Netherlands) Mack Bakkum	All
(Germany) Porsche Esports Team	Porsche 911 RSR GTE	Porsche 4.0 L Flat-6	91	(United States) Mitchell DeJong	All
(Germany) Porsche Esports Team	Porsche 911 RSR GTE	Porsche 4.0 L Flat-6	91	(Germany) Martin Krönke	1–3, 5
(Germany) Porsche Esports Team	Porsche 911 RSR GTE	Porsche 4.0 L Flat-6	91	(Germany) Laurin Heinrich	4–5
(Germany) Porsche Esports Team	Porsche 911 RSR GTE	Porsche 4.0 L Flat-6	92	(Norway) Tommy Østgaard	All
(Germany) Porsche Esports Team	Porsche 911 RSR GTE	Porsche 4.0 L Flat-6	92	(Australia) Joshua Rogers	All
(Germany) Porsche Esports Team	Porsche 911 RSR GTE	Porsche 4.0 L Flat-6	92	(Turkey) Ayhancan Güven	1, 3–5
(Germany) Porsche Esports Team	Porsche 911 RSR GTE	Porsche 4.0 L Flat-6	92	(United States) Sage Karam	2, 5
(Austria) Red Bull Racing Esports	Chevrolet Corvette C8.R	Chevrolet 5.5 L V8	111	(Spain) Nestor Garcia Jr.	All
(Austria) Red Bull Racing Esports	Chevrolet Corvette C8.R	Chevrolet 5.5 L V8	111	(Netherlands) Yuri Kasdorp	All
(Austria) Red Bull Racing Esports	Chevrolet Corvette C8.R	Chevrolet 5.5 L V8	111	(Denmark) Dennis Lind	1, 4–5
(Austria) Red Bull Racing Esports	Chevrolet Corvette C8.R	Chevrolet 5.5 L V8	111	(United Kingdom) Jonny Edgar	2
(Austria) Red Bull Racing Esports	Chevrolet Corvette C8.R	Chevrolet 5.5 L V8	111	(Turkey) Cem Bölükbaşı	3
(Austria) Red Bull Racing Esports	Chevrolet Corvette C8.R	Chevrolet 5.5 L V8	111	(United Kingdom) Sebastian Job	5
(Japan) D'station Racing	Aston Martin Vantage GTE	Aston Martin 4.0 L Turbo V8	777	(Japan) Toshiya Nojima	All
(Japan) D'station Racing	Aston Martin Vantage GTE	Aston Martin 4.0 L Turbo V8	777	(Brazil) João Paulo de Oliveira	All
(Japan) D'station Racing	Aston Martin Vantage GTE	Aston Martin 4.0 L Turbo V8	777	(Japan) Yusuke Tomibayashi	All
(Japan) D'station Racing	Aston Martin Vantage GTE	Aston Martin 4.0 L Turbo V8	777	(Japan) Hideto Yasuoka	5
(France) Tesla R8G Esports	BMW M8 GTE	BMW P63/1 4.0 L Turbo V8	888	(North Macedonia) Timotej Andonovski	All
(France) Tesla R8G Esports	BMW M8 GTE	BMW P63/1 4.0 L Turbo V8	888	(France) Florian Lebigre	1–2
(France) Tesla R8G Esports	BMW M8 GTE	BMW P63/1 4.0 L Turbo V8	888	(France) Simon Pilate	1–2
(France) Tesla R8G Esports	BMW M8 GTE	BMW P63/1 4.0 L Turbo V8	888	(Denmark) Martin Hemmingsen	3–5
(France) Tesla R8G Esports	BMW M8 GTE	BMW P63/1 4.0 L Turbo V8	888	(Russia) Aleksandr Smolyar	3, 5
(France) Tesla R8G Esports	BMW M8 GTE	BMW P63/1 4.0 L Turbo V8	888	(Australia) Scott Andrews	4
(France) Tesla R8G Esports	BMW M8 GTE	BMW P63/1 4.0 L Turbo V8	888	(France) Elliot Vayron	5

== Results ==
Bold indicates overall winner.

Rnd.	Circuit	Pole	LMP2 Winning Team	LMGTE Winning Team	Results
Rnd.	Circuit	Pole	LMP2 Winning Drivers	LMGTE Winning Drivers	Results
1	(Italy) Monza	(France) No. 8 R8G Esports Team	**(Switzerland) No. 70 Realteam Hydrogen Redline**	(Germany) No. 91 Porsche Esports Team	
1	(Italy) Monza	(Netherlands) Hany Alsabti (North Macedonia) Erhan Jajovski (United Kingdom) Gordon Mutch	(Spain) Daniel Juncadella (Netherlands) Jeffrey Rietveld (Czech Republic) Michal Smidl	(Netherlands) Mack Bakkum (United States) Mitchell DeJong (Germany) Martin Krönke	
2	(Belgium) Spa-Francorchamps	(Switzerland) No. 70 Realteam Hydrogen Redline	(Luxembourg) No. 123 Team Redline	(Luxembourg) No. 71 BMW Team Redline	
2	(Belgium) Spa-Francorchamps	(Brazil) Caio Collet (Netherlands) Jeffrey Rietveld (Czech Republic) Michal Smidl	(Sweden) Felix Rosenqvist (Netherlands) Atze Kerkhof (Netherlands) Bono Huis	(Netherlands) Rudy van Buren (Italy) Enzo Bonito (Slovenia) Kevin Siggy	
3	(Germany) Nürburgring	(Austria) No. 4 Floyd ByKolles – Burst eSport	(Luxembourg) No. 123 Team Redline	(France) No. 888 Tesla R8G Esports	
3	(Germany) Nürburgring	(France) Tom Dillmann (Denmark) Jesper Pedersen (Slovenia) Jerernej Simončič	(Sweden) Felix Rosenqvist (Netherlands) Bono Huis (Netherlands) Collin Spork	(Russia) Aleksandr Smolyar (North Macedonia) Timotej Andonovski (Denmark) Martin Hemmingsen	
4	(United States) Sebring	(France) No. 8 R8G Esports Team	(Switzerland) #1 Rebellion GPX Williams	(Luxembourg) #71 BMW Team Redline	
4	(United States) Sebring	(North Macedonia) Erhan Jajovski (United Kingdom) Gordon Mutch (United Kingdom) Isaac Price	(Poland) Kuba Brzezinski (Argentina) Agustín Canapino (Poland) Nikodem Wisniewski	(Netherlands) Rudy van Buren (Italy) Enzo Bonito (Slovenia) Kevin Siggy	
5	(France) Le Mans Virtual	(Switzerland) No. 70 Realteam Hydrogen Redline	(Switzerland) No. 70 Realteam Hydrogen Redline	(Luxembourg) #71 BMW Team Redline	
5	(France) Le Mans Virtual	(Brazil) Felipe Drugovich (United Kingdom) Oliver Rowland (Netherlands) Jeffrey Rietveld (Czech Republic) Michal Smidl	(Brazil) Felipe Drugovich (United Kingdom) Oliver Rowland (Netherlands) Jeffrey Rietveld (Czech Republic) Michal Smidl	(Netherlands) Rudy van Buren (Italy) Lorenzo Colombo (Italy) Enzo Bonito (Slovenia) Kevin Siggy	

== Teams' Championships ==
Points are awarded according to the following structure:

Duration	1st	2nd	3rd	4th	5th	6th	7th	8th	9th	10th	Other
0–6 Hours	25	18	15	12	10	8	6	4	2	1	0.5
8–10 Hours	38	27	23	18	15	12	9	6	3	2	1
24 Hours	50	36	30	24	20	16	12	8	4	2	1

=== LMP2 ===
Pos.	Team	Car	MNZ (Italy)	SPA (Belgium)	NÜR‡ (Germany)	SEB (United States)	LMS (France)	Points
1	(Switzerland) #70 Realteam Hydrogen Redline	Oreca 07	1	**Ret**	19	3	**1**	91
2	(Switzerland) #1 Rebellion GPX Williams	Oreca 07	5	3	7	1	2	90.5
3	(Austria) #4 Floyd ByKolles – Burst eSport	Oreca 07	3	2	**2**	4	3	88.5
4	(Luxembourg) #123 Team Redline	Oreca 07	7	1	1	6	26	59
5	(France) #8 R8G Esports Team	Oreca 07	**12**	4	5	**2**	6	54
6	(United Arab Emirates) #22 GPX Rebellion Williams	Oreca 07	2	5	8	15	10	33.5
7	(Austria) #444 Alpha Ind. ByKolles – Burst eSport	Oreca 07	4	6	6	9	22	29
8	(United Arab Emirates) #49 YAS HEAT	Oreca 07	Ret	16	11	7	5	27.5
9	(United States) #966 Team Fordzilla	Oreca 07	13	9	3	13	7	26.5
10	(Malaysia) #21 Axle Motorsport	Oreca 07	14	13	16	14	4	26.5
11	(Germany) #10 Mahle Racing Team	Oreca 07	8	19	18	5	13	16.5
12	(United Kingdom) #2 Team Rocket Simsport	Oreca 07	6	12	14	18	9	14
13	(France) #14 Race Clutch Alpine	Oreca 07	16	11	4	12	16	11.5
14	(United Kingdom) #38 Jota	Oreca 07	15	15	15	21	8	10.5
15	(France) #18 R8G Esports Team	Oreca 07	Ret	8	10	8	15	10
16	(France) #65 Panis Racing	Oreca 07	Ret	7	12	17	11	8.5
17	(Austria) #11 Red Bull Racing Esports	Oreca 07	9	14	9	16	19	5.5
18	(France) #15 Race Clutch Alpine	Oreca 07	10	10	17	11	28	4.5
19	(Belgium) #31 Team WRT SIMTAG Esports	Oreca 07	Ret	18	13	19	14	3
20	(Slovakia) #44 ARC Bratislava	Oreca 07	11	17	NC	20	25	2.5
21	(United Kingdom) #5 Williams eSports	Oreca 07	Ret	Ret	WD	10	24	2
22	(France) #30 Duqueine/PRiMA eSports	Oreca 07					12	1
23	(France) #16 Pescarolo E-Sport	Oreca 07					17	1
24	#29 Mexico Racing Team	Oreca 07					18	1
25	(United Kingdom) #28 Veloce eSports	Oreca 07					20	1
26	(France) #36 Alpine eSports	Oreca 07					21	1
27	(France) #24 Le Mans Virtual Series Guest Car	Oreca 07					23	1
28	(France) #39 Graff by ProSimu	Oreca 07					27	1
29	(Germany) #67 Mercedes-AMG Petronas eSports	Oreca 07					29	1
Pos.	Team	Car	MNZ (Italy)	SPA (Belgium)	NÜR‡ (Germany)	SEB (United States)	LMS (France)	Points

Key
Colour	Result
Gold	Race winner
Silver	2nd place
Bronze	3rd place
Green	Points finish
Blue	Non-points finish
Blue	Non-classified finish (NC)
Purple	Did not finish (Ret)
Black	Disqualified (DSQ)
Black	Excluded (EX)
White	Did not start (DNS)
White	Race cancelled (C)
White	Withdrew (WD)
Blank	Did not participate

**Bold** – Pole

‡ – Half points for the 8 Hours of Nürburgring as the race was red flagged prematurely.

=== LMGTE ===
Pos.	Team	Car	MNZ (Italy)	SPA (Belgium)	NÜR‡ (Germany)	SEB (United States)	LMS (France)	Points
1	(Luxembourg) #71 BMW Team Redline	BMW M8 GTE	**2**	**1**	4	**1**	**1**	127
2	(Germany) #91 Porsche Esports Team	Porsche 911 RSR GTE	1	2	7	2	2	101.5
3	(Germany) #88 Proton Competition	Porsche 911 RSR GTE	3	4	3	4	12	51.5
4	(Germany) #77 Proton Competition	Porsche 911 RSR GTE	6	9	13	5	3	51
5	(United Kingdom) #55 BMW Team GB	BMW M8 GTE	4	5	8	7	6	47
6	(Austria) #111 Red Bull Racing Esports	Chevrolet Corvette C8.R	13	8	2	3	7	45
7	(Germany) #89 BMW Team BS+Competition	BMW M8 GTE	5	7	5	15	5	44
8	(Italy) #51 FDA Esports Team	Ferrari 488 GTE Evo	7	6	15	8	4	43
9	(Germany) #92 Porsche Esports Team	Porsche 911 RSR GTE	8	3	**6**	6	16	34
10	(France) #888 Tesla R8G Esports	BMW M8 GTE	15	Ret	1	9	8	29.5
11	(United Arab Emirates) #66 SIMMSA Esports	Ferrari 488 GTE Evo	11	10	9	10	9	8
12	(Germany) #56 Team Project 1 x BPM	Porsche 911 RSR GTE	9	Ret	17	16	14	4.5
13	(Germany) #57 Team Project 1 x BPM	Porsche 911 RSR GTE	10	Ret	12	12	15	3.5
14	(Malaysia) #61 Axle Motorsport	Porsche 911 RSR GTE	14	12	11	11	18	3.5
15	(Japan) #777 D'station Racing	Aston Martin Vantage GTE	12	13	14	13	20	3.5
16	(United Kingdom) #86 GR Wolves Racing	Porsche 911 RSR GTE	16	Ret	10	14	19	3
17	(United Kingdom) #87 GR Wolves Racing	Porsche 911 RSR GTE	Ret	11	16	17	11	3
18	(United States) #63 Satellite Racing	Chevrolet Corvette C8.R					10	2
19	(United Kingdom) #84 Prodrive eSports	Aston Martin Vantage GTE					13	1
20	(China) #25 Absolute Inspeed Racing	Porsche 911 RSR GTE					17	1
21	(United Kingdom) #45 W Series	BMW M8 GTE					DNS	0
Pos.	Team	Car	MNZ (Italy)	SPA (Belgium)	NÜR‡ (Germany)	SEB (United States)	LMS (France)	Points

Key
Colour	Result
Gold	Race winner
Silver	2nd place
Bronze	3rd place
Green	Points finish
Blue	Non-points finish
Blue	Non-classified finish (NC)
Purple	Did not finish (Ret)
Black	Disqualified (DSQ)
Black	Excluded (EX)
White	Did not start (DNS)
White	Race cancelled (C)
White	Withdrew (WD)
Blank	Did not participate

**Bold** – Pole

‡ – Half points for the 8 Hours of Nürburgring as the race was red flagged prematurely.
