= 2022 24 Hours of Le Mans Virtual =

2022 sim racing esports event

Layout of the Circuit de la Sarthe

The 2022 24 Hours of Le Mans Virtual was an esports 24-hour automobile endurance race for Le Mans Prototype (LMP) and Le Mans Grand Touring Endurance (LMGTE) vehicles held on a simulated version of the Circuit de la Sarthe from 15 to 16 January 2022. It was hosted on the rFactor 2 gaming platform as the fifth and final round of the 2021–22 Le Mans Virtual Series. The race featured 50 teams of four drivers each sharing one car, divided into two categories of vehicles: LMP and GTE. There were 29 teams in the LMP class and 21 in the GTE category. High-profile drivers like two-time Formula One world champion Max Verstappen and IndyCar driver Juan Pablo Montoya competed in the race.

== Results ==
=== Qualifying ===
Pole position winners in each of the two classes are indicated in bold.

Final qualifying classification
Pos	Class	No.	Team	Car	Time	Gap
**1**	**LMP**	**70**	**Realteam Hydrogen Redline**	**Oreca 07**	**3:21.219**	
2	LMP	123	Team Redline	Oreca 07	3:21.221	+0.002
3	LMP	67	Mercedes-AMG Petronas eSports	Oreca 07	3:21.258	+0.039
4	LMP	28	Veloce eSports	Oreca 07	3:21.443	+0.224
5	LMP	14	Race Clutch Alpine	Oreca 07	3:21.496	+0.277
6	LMP	4	Floyd ByKolles-Burst	Oreca 07	3:21.563	+0.344
7	LMP	65	Panis Racing	Oreca 07	3:21.716	+0.497
8	LMP	21	SEM9 Flash Axle Motorsport	Oreca 07	3:21.765	+0.546
9	LMP	31	Team WRT SIMTAG eSports	Oreca 07	3:21.824	+0.605
10	LMP	11	Red Bull Racing eSports	Oreca 07	3:21.865	+0.646
11	LMP	444	Alpha Ind. ByKolles-Burst	Oreca 07	3:21.882	+0.663
12	LMP	1	Rebellion GPX eSports	Oreca 07	3:21.906	+0.687
13	LMP	24	Le Mans Virtual Series Guest Car	Oreca 07	3:21.984	+0.765
14	LMP	8	R8G ESPORTS	Oreca 07	3:22.042	+0.823
15	LMP	966	Team Fordzilla	Oreca 07	3:22.062	+0.843
16	LMP	15	Alpine eSports	Oreca 07	3:22.074	+0.855
17	LMP	36	Alpine eSports	Oreca 07	3:22.233	+1.014
18	LMP	22	GPX Rebellion eSports	Oreca 07	3:22.311	+1.092
19	LMP	49	YAS HEAT	Oreca 07	3:22.321	+1.102
20	LMP	38	Jota Sport	Oreca 07	3:22.361	+1.142
21	LMP	18	R8G ESPORTS	Oreca 07	3:22.504	+1.285
22	LMP	10	Mahle Racing Team	Oreca 07	3:22.550	+1.331
23	LMP	5	Williams eSports	Oreca 07	3:22.936	+1.717
24	LMP	39	Graff by ProSimu	Oreca 07	3:23.652	+2.433
25	LMP	30	Duqueine/PRiMA eSports	Oreca 07	3:24.137	+2.918
26	LMP	16	Pescarolo E-Sport	Oreca 07	3:24.310	+3.091
27	LMP	44	ARC Bratislava	Oreca 07	3:24.772	+3.553
28	LMP	29	Mexico Racing Team	Oreca 07	3:26.473	+5.254
29	**GTE**	**111**	**Red Bull Racing eSports**	**Chevrolet Corvette C8.R**	**3:46.438**	**+25.219**
30	GTE	91	Porsche eSports Team	Porsche 911 RSR GTE	3:46.528	+25.309
31	GTE	71	BMW Team Redline	BMW M8 GTE	3:46.600	+25.381
32	GTE	88	Proton Competition	Porsche 911 RSR GTE	3:46.871	+25.652
33	GTE	92	Porsche eSports Team	Porsche 911 RSR GTE	3:47.132	+25.913
34	GTE	89	BMW Team BS+COMPETITION	BMW M8 GTE	3:47.290	+26.071
35	GTE	888	TESLA R8G eSports	BMW M8 GTE	3:47.305	+26.086
36	GTE	55	BMW Team GB	BMW M8 GTE	3:47.750	+26.531
37	GTE	51	FDA eSports Team	Ferrari 488 GTE Evo	3:47.918	+26.699
38	GTE	77	Proton Competition	Porsche 911 RSR GTE	3:48.282	+27.063
39	GTE	84	Prodrive eSports	Aston Martin Vantage GTE	3:48.461	+27.242
40	GTE	87	GR Wolves Racing	Porsche 911 RSR GTE	3:48.502	+27.283
41	GTE	57	Team Project 1 x BPM	Porsche 911 RSR GTE	3:48.548	+27.329
42	GTE	777	D'Station Racing	Aston Martin Vantage GTE	3:48.622	+27.403
43	GTE	61	SEM9 Axle Motorsport	Porsche 911 RSR GTE	3:48.955	+27.736
44	GTE	63	Satellite Racing	Chevrolet Corvette C8.R	3:48.959	+27.740
45	GTE	66	SIMMSA eSports	Ferrari 488 GTE Evo	3:49.436	+28.217
46	GTE	45	W Series	BMW M8 GTE	3:49.511	+28.292
47	GTE	86	GR Wolves Racing	Porsche 911 RSR GTE	3:49.571	+28.352
48	GTE	56	Team Project 1 x BPM	Porsche 911 RSR GTE	3:50.934	+29.715
49	GTE	25	Absolute Inspeed Racing	Porsche 911 RSR GTE	3:51.317	+30.098
50	LMP	2	Rocket Simsport	Oreca 07	No time	—

=== Race ===
Class winners are denoted in bold.

Final race results
Pos	Class	No.	Team	Drivers	Car	Laps	Time/Retired
1	**LMP**	**70**	(Switzerland) **Realteam Hydrogen Redline**	(Brazil) **Felipe Drugovich** (United Kingdom) **Oliver Rowland** (Netherlands) **Jeffrey Rietveld** (Czech Republic) **Michal Smidl**	**Oreca 07**	**407**	
2	LMP	1	(Switzerland) Rebellion GPX eSports	(Switzerland) Louis Delétraz (Argentina) Agustín Canapino (Poland) Jakub Brzezinski (Poland) Nikodem Wisniewski	Oreca 07	407	
3	LMP	4	(Romania) Floyd ByKolles-Burst	(France) Tom Dillmann (Netherlands) Bent Viscaal (Netherlands) Jesper Pedersen (Slovenia) Jernej Simončic	Oreca 07	406	+1 lap
4	LMP	21	(Malaysia) SEM9 Flash Axle Motorsport	(Malaysia) Naquib Azlan (Philippines) Iñígo Anton (Australia) Josh Purwien (Singapore) Muhammad Aleef	Oreca 07	406	+1 lap
5	LMP	49	(United Arab Emirates) YAS HEAT	(United Kingdom) Will Tregurtha (United Kingdom) Sandy Mitchell (Germany) Marko Pejić (Hungary) Balázs Remenyik	Oreca 07	406	+1 lap
6	LMP	8	(France) R8G ESPORTS	(Switzerland) Mathias Beche (Australia) Scott Andrews (North Macedonia) Erhan Jajovski (United Kingdom) Isaac Price	Oreca 07	405	+2 laps
7	LMP	966	(United Kingdom) Team Fordzilla	(Spain) Álex Palou (United Kingdom) Luke Browning (Portugal) Nuno Pinto (Spain) Pablo López Padín	Oreca 07	405	+2 laps
8	LMP	38	(United Kingdom) Jota Sport	(United Kingdom) Jordan Albert (Malaysia) Mika Hakimi (United Kingdom) Ibraheem Khan (United Kingdom) Ferris Stanley	Oreca 07	405	+2 laps
9	LMP	2	(United Kingdom) Rocket Simsport	(United Kingdom) Alex Buncombe (Germany) Marc Gaßner (Germany) Devin Braune (Germany) Jan von der Heyde	Oreca 07	404	+3 laps
10	LMP	22	(United Arab Emirates) GPX Rebellion eSports	(Argentina) Néstor Girolami (China) Yi-Fei Ye (Czech Republic) Jiri Toman (Hungary) Marcell Csincsik	Oreca 07	404	+3 laps
11	LMP	65	(France) Panis Racing	(Argentina) Nicolás Varrone (Italy) Gabriele Minì (Italy) Alessandro Ottaviani (Brazil) Gustavo Ariel	Oreca 07	404	+3 laps
12	LMP	30	(France) Duqueine/PRiMA eSports	(France) Gabriel Aubry (France) Léo Boulay (France) Maxime Delpech (France) Arnaud Lacombe	Oreca 07	403	+4 laps
13	LMP	10	(Germany) Mahle Racing Team	(Netherlands) Beitske Visser (United States) Philippe Denes (Italy) Michele D’Alessandro (United Kingdom) Muhammed Patel	Oreca 07	402	+5 laps
14	LMP	31	(Belgium) Team WRT SIMTAG eSports	(Argentina) Franco Colapinto (Japan) Ryuichiro Tomita (Belgium) Fabrice Cornelis (Germany) Benjamin Gielczynski	Oreca 07	402	+5 laps
15	LMP	18	(France) R8G ESPORTS	(France) Arthur Rougier (Netherlands) Job van Uitert (France) Thibault Cazaubon (Estonia) Risto Kappet	Oreca 07	401	+6 laps
16	LMP	14	(France) Race Clutch Alpine	(Poland) Nikodem Wierzbicki (France) Paul-Adrien Pallot (United States) Rory MacDuff (France) Tom Lartilleux	Oreca 07	400	+7 laps
17	LMP	16	(France) Pescarolo E-Sport	(France) Bruce Jouanny (France) Adrien Tambay (France) Thomas Imbourg (France) Quentin Vialatte	Oreca 07	398	+9 laps
18	LMP	29	Mexico Racing Team	(Mexico) Memo Rojas (Mexico) Benito Guerra, Jr. (Mexico) Alberto Gironella (Mexico) Alex de Alba	Oreca 07	392	+15 laps
19	LMP	11	(Austria) Red Bull Racing eSports	(Australia) Cooper Webster (Hungary) Norbert Kiss (Denmark) Frederik Rasmussen (Germany) Dennis Jordan	Oreca 07	384	+23 laps
20	**GTE**	**71**	(Luxembourg) **BMW Team Redline**	(Netherlands) **Rudy van Buren** (Italy) **Lorenzo Colombo** (Italy) **Enzo Bonito** (Slovenia) **Kevin Siggy**	**BMW M8 GTE**	**367**	**+40 laps**
21	GTE	91	(Germany) Porsche eSports Team	(United States) Mitchell DeJong (Germany) Laurin Heinrich (Netherlands) Mack Bakkum (Germany) Martin Krönke	Porsche 911 RSR GTE	367	+40 laps
22	GTE	77	(Germany) Proton Competition	(Netherlands) Loek Hartog (Australia) Matthew Campbell (Netherlands) Kevin van Dooren (France) Jeremy Bouteloup	Porsche 911 RSR GTE	366	+41 laps
23	GTE	51	(Italy) FDA eSports Team	(Denmark) Nicklas Nielsen (South Africa) David Perel (Netherlands) Jordy Zwiers (Denmark) Kasper Stoltze	Ferrari 488 GTE Evo	366	+41 laps
24	GTE	89	(Germany) BMW Team BS+COMPETITION	(Canada) Bruno Spengler (United States) Robby Foley (Slovakia) Alen Terzić (Finland) Joonas Raivio	BMW M8 GTE	365	+42 laps
25	GTE	55	(United Kingdom) BMW Team GB	(Finland) Sami-Matti Trogen (Norway) Sindre Setsås (Czech Republic) Martin Štefanko (United Kingdom) Jack Keithley	BMW M8 GTE	365	+42 laps
26	GTE	111	(Austria) Red Bull Racing eSports	(Denmark) Dennis Lind (Netherlands) Yuri Kasadorp (Spain) Néstor García (United Kingdom) Sebastian Job	Chevrolet Corvette C8.R	365	+42 laps
27	GTE	888	(France) TESLA R8G eSports	(France) Elliott Vayron (Russia) Aleksandr Smolyar (North Macedonia) Timotej Andonovski (Denmark) Martin Hemmingsen	BMW M8 GTE	364	+43 laps
28	GTE	66	(United Arab Emirates) SIMMSA eSports	(Lithuania) Gustas Grinbergas (Canada) Ramez Azzam (Germany) Armin Binder (Germany) Sebastian Wunsch	Ferrari 488 GTE Evo	364	+43 laps
29	GTE	63	(United States) Satellite Racing	(Colombia) Gabby Chaves (United States) James French (Estonia) Henri Sinik (Finland) Jimi Nisula	Chevrolet Corvette C8.R	362	+45 laps
30	GTE	87	(United Kingdom) GR Wolves Racing	(United Kingdom) Ben Barker (Republic of Ireland) Ryan Cullen (Germany) Philipp Puschke (Finland) Turkka Hakkinnen	Porsche 911 RSR GTE	361	+46 laps
31	GTE	88	(Germany) Proton Competition	(Luxembourg) Dylan Pereira (Norway) Sindre Furuseth (United Kingdom) Charlie Collins (Australia) Dayne Warren	Porsche 911 RSR GTE	361	+46 laps
32	GTE	84	(United Kingdom) Prodrive eSports	(United Kingdom) David Pittard (United Kingdom) Tom Canning (United Kingdom) Logan Hannah (Denmark) Lasse Sørensen	Aston Martin Vantage GTE	360	+47 laps
33	GTE	56	(Germany) Team Project 1 x BPM	(United Kingdom) Jimmy Broadbent (Germany) René Buttler (Netherlands) Bram Beelen (Germany) Tim Neuendorf	Porsche 911 RSR GTE	358	+49 laps
34	GTE	57	(Germany) Team Project 1 x BPM	(Italy) Riccardo Pera (Germany) Nicolas Hillebrand (Poland) Zbigniew Siara (Bulgaria) Peyo Peev	Porsche 911 RSR GTE	358	+49 laps
35	LMP	28	(United Kingdom) Veloce eSports	(United Kingdom) James Baldwin (United Kingdom) Mike Epps (Netherlands) Isaac Gillissen (Republic of Ireland) Eamonn Murphy	Oreca 07	357	+50 laps
36	LMP	36	(France) Alpine eSports	(France) Sascha Lehmann (France) Victor Martins (Finland) Olli Pahkala (Hungary) Patrik Sipos	Oreca 07	263	+144 laps
37	GTE	92	(Germany) Porsche eSports Team	(Turkey) Ayhancan Güven (United States) Sage Karam (Australia) Joshua Rogers (Norway) Tommy Østgaard	Porsche 911 RSR GTE	221	+186 laps
38	LMP	444	(Romania) Alpha Ind. ByKolles-Burst	(Brazil) Sérgio Sette Câmara (Denmark) Lucas Ditlev Daugaard (Germany) Michi Hoyer (Poland) Dawid Mroczek	Oreca 07	212	+195 laps
39	GTE	25	(China) Absolute Inspeed Racing	(United Kingdom) Johnathan Hoggard (China) Zhuo Cao (China) Xiayu-Fei Li (China) Yan-Zhe Li	Porsche 911 RSR GTE	200	+207 laps
40	LMP	24	(France) Le Mans Virtual Series Guest Car	(Colombia) Juan Pablo Montoya (Colombia) Sebastián Montoya (Italy) Luca D'Amelio (Sweden) Christopher Högfeldt	Oreca 07	183	+224 laps
41	LMP	5	(United Kingdom) Williams eSports	(Hungary) Attila Tassi (Croatia) Petar Brljak (Italy) Moreno Sirica (Greece) Michael Romanidis	Oreca 07	170	+237 laps
42	GTE	61	(Malaysia) SEM9 Axle Motorsport	(Malaysia) Alister Yoong (Indonesia) Avila Bahar (Malaysia) Nabil Azlan (Italy) Davide Arduini	Porsche 911 RSR GTE	156	+251 laps
43	LMP	44	(Slovakia) ARC Bratislava	(Slovakia) Mat'o Homola (Slovakia) Dávid Nemček (Slovakia) Dennis Zeťák (Slovakia) Jakub Štofko	Oreca 07	148	+259 laps
44	LMP	123	(Luxembourg) Team Redline	(Netherlands) Max Verstappen (Sweden) Felix Rosenqvist (Germany) Maximilian Benecke (Netherlands) Atze Kerkhof	Oreca 07	124	+283 laps
45	LMP	39	(France) Graff by ProSimu	(France) Vincent Capillaire (France) Maxime Robin (France) Maxime Brient (France) Yohann Harth	Oreca 07	108	+299 laps
46	GTE	86	(United Kingdom) GR Wolves Racing	(Australia) Nick Foster (Australia) Bart Horsten (Republic of Ireland) Adam Maguire (Netherlands) Liam de Waal	Porsche 911 RSR GTE	80	+327 laps
47	LMP	15	(France) Alpine eSports	(France) Romain Boeckler (France) Antoine Doquin (France) Eneric André (Hungary) Peter Zuba	Oreca 07	62	+345 laps
48	LMP	67	(Germany) Mercedes-AMG Petronas eSports	(Spain) Daniel Juncadella (United Kingdom) Ross Gunn (Netherlands) Bono Huis (Netherlands) Jarno Opmeer	Oreca 07	55	+352 laps
49	GTE	777	(Japan) D'Station Racing	(Brazil) João Paulo de Oliveira (Japan) Hideto Yasuoka (Japan) Yusuke Tomibayashi (Japan) Toshiya Nojima	Aston Martin Vantage GTE	47	+360 laps
DNS	GTE	45	(United Kingdom) W Series	(Norway) Ayla Ågren (Australia) Emily Jones (Kazakhstan) Lyubov Ozeretskovskaya (Liechtenstein) Fabienne Wohlwend	BMW M8 GTE	0	Server issues
