= 2020 TireRack.com Grand Prix at Road Atlanta =

Sixth round of the 2020 IMSA SportsCar Championship season

Track map of Road Atlanta

The 2020 TireRack.com Grand Prix at Road Atlanta was a sports car race sanctioned by the International Motor Sports Association (IMSA). The race was held at Road Atlanta in Braselton, Georgia, on September 5, 2020. This race was the sixth round of the 2020 WeatherTech SportsCar Championship, and the second round of the 2020 Michelin Endurance Cup.

The overall race was won by the #7 Acura Team Penske duo of Hélio Castroneves and Ricky Taylor. In LMP2, Scott Huffaker, Patrick Kelly, and Simon Trummer claimed PR1 Mathiasen Motorsports' second class victory of the season. BMW Team RLL triumphed in GTLM, scoring their second win in as many endurance races with Connor De Phillippi and Bruno Spengler behind the wheel. GTD was won by Meyer Shank Racing's #86 entry of Mario Farnbacher, Matt McMurry, and Shinya Michimi.

== Background ==
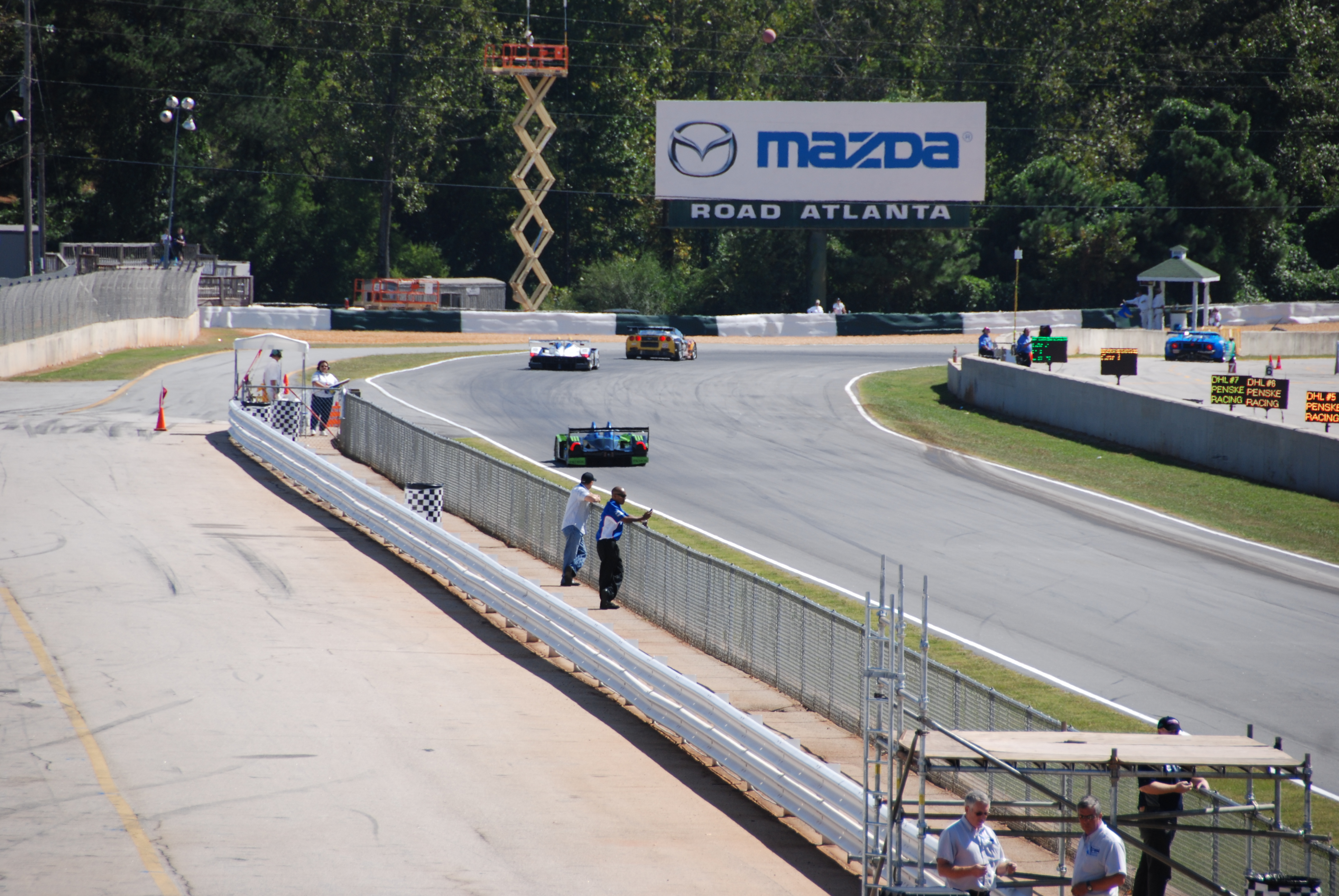
Michelin Raceway Road Atlanta, where the race was held.

The race was brought about as a replacement to the annual 6 Hours of Watkins Glen, which was canceled in 2020 due to New York state COVID-19 travel and gathering restrictions. In late August, Tire Rack was announced as the title sponsor of the event. After fan entry was prohibited at the previous round at VIR, spectators were allowed to attend the event, albeit subject to strict COVID-19 restrictions, including a lack of paddock access and facemask mandates.

On August 27, 2020, IMSA released their latest technical bulletin, outlining BoP for the race. In DPi, the lone change was a 15 kilogram weight reduction for the Cadillac. Similarly in GTLM, a 20 kilogram weight increase for the Porsche was the only adjustment made. In GTD, the Aston Martin received a 7.1 kilowatt increase to its average power delta, alongside increases to its turbocharger boost ratio. Several GTD cars also underwent fuel capacity adjustments. The Aston Martin, BMW, and Ferrari all received slight increases, while the Lamborghini received a one liter fuel capacity decrease.

Before the race, Ryan Briscoe and Renger van der Zande led the DPi Drivers' Championship with 124 points, ahead of Sébastien Bourdais and João Barbosa, and Oliver Jarvis and Tristan Nunez with 117 points. In LMP2, Cameron Cassels led the Drivers' Championship with 64 points, 1 point ahead of Patrick Kelly in second followed by Henrik Hedman in third. Antonio García and Jordan Taylor led the GTLM Drivers' Championship with 165 points, 19 points ahead of Earl Bamber and Laurens Vanthoor in second, and Oliver Gavin and Tommy Milner in third. With 115 points, the GTD Drivers' Championship was led by Jack Hawksworth, ahead of Mario Farnbacher and Matt McMurry in second. Cadillac, Chevrolet, and Lexus were leading their respective Manufactures' Championships while Konica Minolta Cadillac DPi-V.R, Performance Tech Motorsports, Corvette Racing, and AIM Vasser Sullivan each led their own Teams' Championships.

=== Entries ===
A total of 28 cars took part in the event, split across four classes. 8 were entered in DPi, 2 in LMP2, 6 in GTLM, and 12 in GTD. Due to the endurance nature of the event, many teams drafted in a third driver, with teams in the LMP2 and GTD classes obligated to do so. Tristan Vautier, after running the majority of the early season with JDC-Miller Motorsports' #85 entry, was entered as a third driver in the #5. As a result, Stephen Simpson returned to the #85 to partner Matheus Leist. The preliminary LMP2 class list featured four entries, which reduced to two by the time the green flag dropped. Starworks Motorsport withdrew early, and were followed by Performance Tech Motorsports after travel restrictions prohibited driver Cameron Cassels from traveling to and from his native Canada. In GTD, the third driver demands forced AIM Vasser Sullivan to split the championship-contending duo of Aaron Telitz and Jack Hawksworth, placing Telitz in the #12 and leaving Hawksworth in the #14. GRT Grasser Racing Team also returned to IMSA competition, after most recently competing in the season-opening 24 Hours of Daytona. They fielded a Lamborghini for Richard Heistand, Steijn Schothorst, and Richard Westbrook.

== Practice ==
There were two practice sessions preceding the start of the race on Saturday, both on Friday. The first session lasted one hour on Friday morning while the second session lasted 75 minutes on Friday afternoon.

=== Practice 1 ===
The first practice session took place at 10:00 am ET on Friday and ended with Pipo Derani topping the charts for Whelen Engineering Racing, with a lap time of 1:09.743. Colin Braun was fastest in LMP2 with a time of 1:10.910. The GTLM class was topped by the #912 Porsche GT Team Porsche 911 RSR-19 of Earl Bamber with a time of 1:17.552. Nick Tandy in the sister #911 Porsche GT Team entry was second and John Edwards rounded out the top three. The GTD class was topped by the #44 GRT Magnus Lamborghini Huracán GT3 Evo of Andy Lally with a time of 1:20.538.

Pos.	Class	No.	Team	Driver	Time	Gap
1	DPi	31	Whelen Engineering Racing	Pipo Derani	1:09.743	_
2	DPi	5	JDC-Mustang Sampling Racing	Sébastien Bourdais	1:10.132	+0.389
3	DPi	55	Mazda Motorsports	Harry Tincknell	1:10.404	+0.661

=== Practice 2 ===
The second and final practice session took place at 2:25 pm ET on Friday and ended with Felipe Nasr topping the charts for Whelen Engineering Racing, with a lap time of 1:09.023. Simon Trummer set the fastest time in LMP2. The GTLM class was topped by the #25 BMW Team RLL BMW M8 GTE of Connor De Phillippi with a time of 1:16.875. Laurens Vanthoor in the #912 Porsche GT Team entry was second and Antonio García rounded out the top 3. Steijn Schothorst was fastest in GTD with a time of 1:20.346.

Pos.	Class	No.	Team	Driver	Time	Gap
1	DPi	31	Whelen Engineering Racing	Felipe Nasr	1:09.023	_
2	DPi	10	Konica Minolta Cadillac	Renger van der Zande	1:09.534	+0.511
3	DPi	77	Mazda Motorsports	Tristan Nunez	1:09.577	+0.554

== Qualifying ==
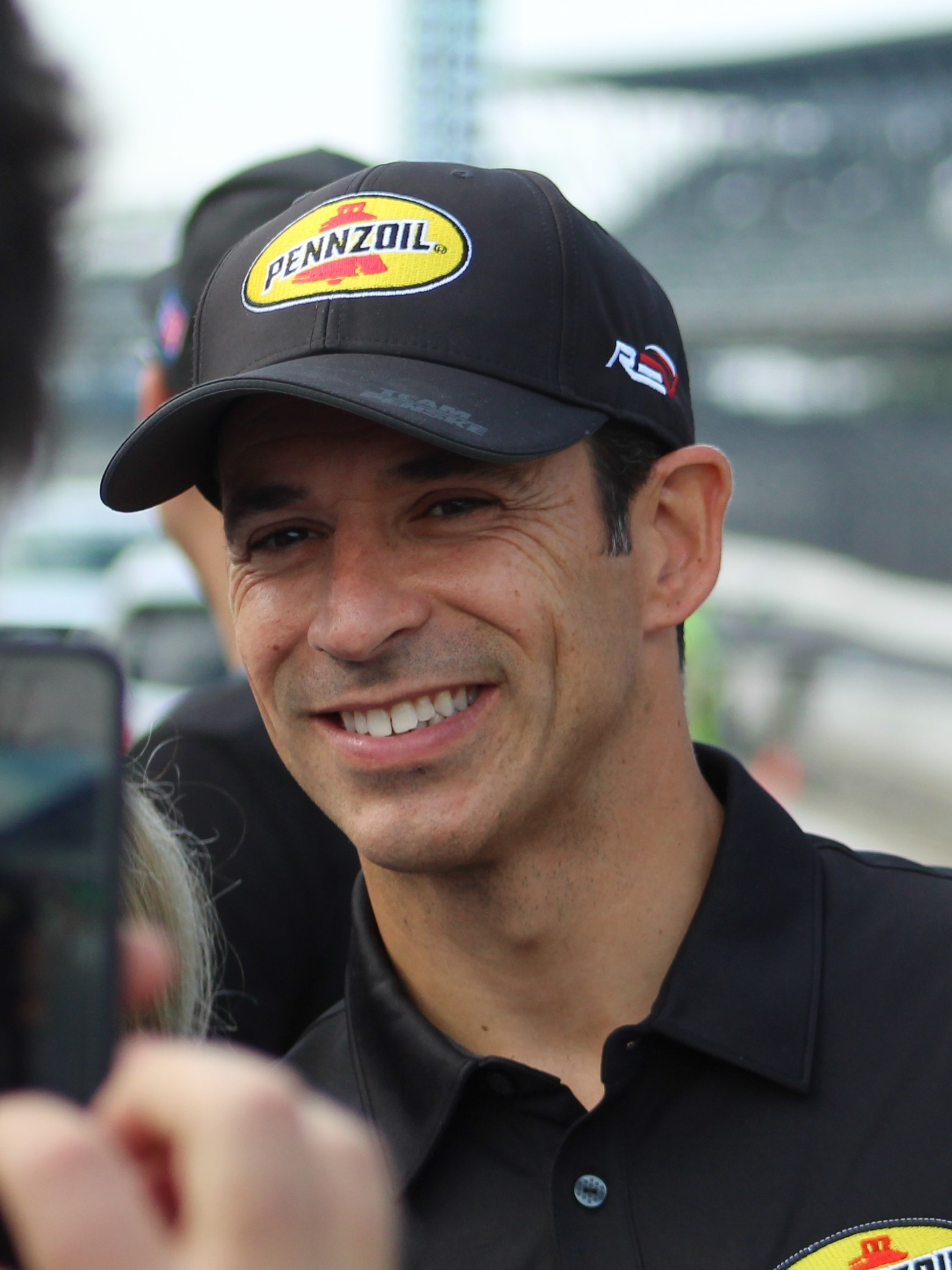
Hélio Castroneves (pictured in 2018) helped take the No. 7 Acura's third pole position of 2020.

Friday's evening qualifying was broken into three sessions, with one session for the DPi and LMP2, GTLM, and GTD classes, which lasted for 15 minutes each, and a ten minute interval between the sessions. The rules dictated that all teams nominated a driver to qualify their cars, with the Pro-Am (LMP2/GTD) classes requiring a Bronze/Silver Rated Driver to qualify the car. The competitors' fastest lap times determined the starting order. IMSA then arranged the grid to put DPis ahead of the LMP2, GTLM, and GTD cars.

The first session was for cars in GTD class. Frankie Montecalvo qualified on pole for the class driving the #12 car for AIM Vasser Sullivan, besting Madison Snow in the Paul Miller Racing entry.

The second session was for cars in the GTLM class. Nick Tandy qualified on pole driving the #911 car for Porsche GT Team, beating Antonio García in the #3 Corvette Racing entry by less than twenty-hundredths of a second. All cars in class qualified within two tenths of the pole time.

The final session of qualifying was for cars in the LMP2 and DPi classes. Hélio Castroneves qualified on pole driving the #7 car for Acura Team Penske, beating Felipe Nasr in the #31Whelen Engineering Racing car by less than one-tenth of a second. Patrick Kelly qualified on pole in LMP2 driving the #52 PR1/Mathiasen Motorsports car.

=== Qualifying results ===
Pole positions in each class are indicated in bold and by ‡.

Pos.	Class	No.	Team	Driver	Time	Gap	Grid
1	**DPi**	**7**	**(United States) Acura Team Penske**	**(Brazil) Hélio Castroneves**	**1:08.674**	**_**	1‡
2	DPi	31	(United States) Whelen Engineering Racing	(Brazil) Felipe Nasr	1:08.730	+0.056	2
3	DPi	6	(United States) Acura Team Penske	(United States) Dane Cameron	1:08.767	+0.093	3
4	DPi	77	(Canada) Mazda Motorsports	(United States) Tristan Nunez	1:08.916	+0.242	8^{1}
5	DPi	55	(Canada) Mazda Motorsports	(United Kingdom) Harry Tincknell	1:08.948	+0.274	4
6	DPi	5	(United States) JDC-Mustang Sampling Racing	(France) Sébastien Bourdais	1:09.067	+0.393	5
7	DPi	10	(United States) Konica Minolta Cadillac	(Netherlands) Renger van der Zande	1:09.079	+0.405	6
8	DPi	85	(United States) JDC-Miller MotorSports	(Brazil) Matheus Leist	1:09.683	+1.009	7
9	**LMP2**	**52**	**(United States) PR1/Mathiasen Motorsports**	**(United States) Patrick Kelly**	**1:12.209**	**+3.535**	9‡
10	LMP2	18	(United States) Era Motorsport	(United States) Dwight Merriman	1:15.490	+6.816	10^{2}
11	**GTLM**	**911**	**(United States) Porsche GT Team**	**(United Kingdom) Nick Tandy**	**1:16.167**	**+7.493**	11‡
12	GTLM	3	(United States) Corvette Racing	(Spain) Antonio García	1:16.181	+7.507	12
13	GTLM	4	(United States) Corvette Racing	(United States) Tommy Milner	1:16.212	+7.538	13
14	GTLM	912	(United States) Porsche GT Team	(Belgium) Laurens Vanthoor	1:16.245	+7.571	14^{3}
15	GTLM	25	(United States) BMW Team RLL	(United States) Connor De Phillippi	1:16.253	+7.579	15^{4}
16	GTLM	24	(United States) BMW Team RLL	(Finland) Jesse Krohn	1:16.359	+7.685	16^{5}
17	**GTD**	**12**	**(Canada) AIM Vasser Sullivan**	**(United States) Frankie Montecalvo**	**1:19.757**	**+11.083**	17‡
18	GTD	48	(United States) Paul Miller Racing	(United States) Madison Snow	1:19.907	+11.233	18
19	GTD	16	(United States) Wright Motorsports	(Belgium) Jan Heylen	1:19.920	+11.246	19
20	GTD	86	(United States) Meyer Shank Racing with Curb-Agajanian	(Japan) Shinya Michimi	1:20.009	+11.335	20
21	GTD	11	(Austria) GRT Grasser Racing Team	(Netherlands) Steijn Schothorst	1:20.125	+11.451	21
22	GTD	57	(United States) Heinricher Racing with MSR Curb-Agajanian	(Canada) Misha Goikhberg	1:20.364	+11.690	22
23	GTD	96	(United States) Turner Motorsport	(United States) Robby Foley	1:20.469	+11.795	23
24	GTD	63	(United States) Scuderia Corsa	(United States) Jeff Westphal	1:20.606	+11.932	24
25	GTD	14	(Canada) AIM Vasser Sullivan	(United States) Michael de Quesada	1:20.615	+11.941	25
26	GTD	74	(United States) Riley Motorsports	(United States) Gar Robinson	1:20.649	+11.975	26
27	GTD	23	(United States) Heart of Racing Team	(United Kingdom) Ian James	1:20.828	+12.154	28^{6}
28	GTD	44	(United States) GRT Magnus	Did Not Participate			27
Sources:

- ^{1} The No. 77 Mazda Motorsports entry initially qualified fourth for the DPi class. However, the team changed engines after qualifying. By IMSA rules, the entry was moved to the rear of the DPi field on the starting grid.
- ^{2} The No. 18 Era Motorsport entry was moved to the back of the LMP2 field as per Article 40.1.4 of the Sporting regulations (Change of starting tires).
- ^{3} The No. 912 Porsche GT Team entry was moved to the back of the GTLM field as per Article 40.1.4 of the Sporting regulations (Change of starting tires).
- ^{4} The No. 25 BMW Team RLL entry was moved to the back of the GTLM field as per Article 40.1.4 of the Sporting regulations (Change of starting tires).
- ^{5} The No. 24 BMW Team RLL entry was moved to the back of the GTLM field as per Article 40.1.4 of the Sporting regulations (Change of starting tires).
- ^{6} The No. 23 Heart of Racing Team entry was moved to the back of the GTD field as per Article 40.1.4 of the Sporting regulations (Change of starting tires).

== Race ==
=== Post-race ===
The result kept Briscoe and van der Zande atop the DPi Drivers' Championship with 150 points. Jarvis and Nunez dropped from third to fifth while Derani advanced from fourth to third. As a result of winning the race, Kelly took the lead of the LMP2 Drivers' Championship with 98 points. Merriman and Tilley advanced from fourth to second. The result kept Antonio García and Jordan Taylor atop the GTLM Drivers' Championship with 191 points. De Phillippi and Spengler advanced from sixth to third as a result of winning the race while Bamber and Vanthoor dropped from second to fifth. Edwards and Krohn moved to fourth after being fifth coming into Road Atlanta. As a result of winning the race, Farnbacher and McMurry took the lead of the GTD Drivers' Championship with 150 points. Hawksworth dropped from first to third while Hardwick and Long advanced from sixth to fifth. Cadillac and Chevrolet continued to top their respective Manufacturers' Championships while Acura took the lead of the GTD Manufactures' Championship. Konica Minolta Cadillac DPi-V.R and Corvette Racing kept their respective advantages in their respective of Teams' Championships. PR1/Mathiasen Motorsports and Meyer Shank Racing with Curb-Agajanian became the leaders of their respective class Teams' Championships with five rounds remaining in the season.

=== Results ===
Class winners are denoted in bold and ‡.

Pos	Class	No.	Team	Drivers	Chassis	Laps	Time/Retired
Pos	Class	No.	Team	Drivers	Engine	Laps	Time/Retired
1	**DPi**	**7**	**(United States) Acura Team Penske**	**(Brazil) Hélio Castroneves (United States) Ricky Taylor**	**Acura ARX-05**	**273**	**6:00:54.929‡**
1	**DPi**	**7**	**(United States) Acura Team Penske**	**(Brazil) Hélio Castroneves (United States) Ricky Taylor**	**Acura AR35TT 3.5L Turbo V6**	**273**	**6:00:54.929‡**
2	DPi	55	(Canada) Mazda Motorsports	(United States) Jonathan Bomarito (United States) Ryan Hunter-Reay (United Kingdom) Harry Tincknell	Mazda RT24-P	273	+0.983
2	DPi	55	(Canada) Mazda Motorsports	(United States) Jonathan Bomarito (United States) Ryan Hunter-Reay (United Kingdom) Harry Tincknell	Mazda MZ-2.0T 2.0L Turbo I4	273	+0.983
3	DPi	31	(United States) Whelen Engineering Racing	(Portugal) Filipe Albuquerque (Brazil) Pipo Derani (Brazil) Felipe Nasr	Cadillac DPi-V.R	273	+2.067
3	DPi	31	(United States) Whelen Engineering Racing	(Portugal) Filipe Albuquerque (Brazil) Pipo Derani (Brazil) Felipe Nasr	Cadillac 5.5L V8	273	+2.067
4	DPi	5	(United States) JDC-Mustang Sampling Racing	(Portugal) João Barbosa (France) Sébastien Bourdais (France) Tristan Vautier	Cadillac DPi-V.R	273	+3.442
4	DPi	5	(United States) JDC-Mustang Sampling Racing	(Portugal) João Barbosa (France) Sébastien Bourdais (France) Tristan Vautier	Cadillac 5.5L V8	273	+3.442
5	DPi	10	(United States) Konica Minolta Cadillac	(Australia) Ryan Briscoe (Netherlands) Renger van der Zande	Cadillac DPi-V.R	273	+3.993
5	DPi	10	(United States) Konica Minolta Cadillac	(Australia) Ryan Briscoe (Netherlands) Renger van der Zande	Cadillac 5.5L V8	273	+3.993
6	DPi	6	(United States) Acura Team Penske	(United States) Dane Cameron (Colombia) Juan Pablo Montoya	Acura ARX-05	265	Crash
6	DPi	6	(United States) Acura Team Penske	(United States) Dane Cameron (Colombia) Juan Pablo Montoya	Acura AR35TT 3.5L Turbo V6	265	Crash
7	**LMP2**	**52**	**(United States) PR1/Mathiasen Motorsports**	**(United States) Scott Huffaker (United States) Patrick Kelly (Switzerland) Simon Trummer**	**Oreca 07**	**264**	**+9 Laps‡**
7	**LMP2**	**52**	**(United States) PR1/Mathiasen Motorsports**	**(United States) Scott Huffaker (United States) Patrick Kelly (Switzerland) Simon Trummer**	**Gibson 4.2L GK428 V8**	**264**	**+9 Laps‡**
8	**GTLM**	**25**	**(United States) BMW Team RLL**	**(United States) Connor De Phillippi (Canada) Bruno Spengler**	**BMW M8 GTE**	**254**	**+19 Laps‡**
8	**GTLM**	**25**	**(United States) BMW Team RLL**	**(United States) Connor De Phillippi (Canada) Bruno Spengler**	**BMW S63 4.0L Turbo V8**	**254**	**+19 Laps‡**
9	GTLM	4	(United States) Corvette Racing	(United Kingdom) Oliver Gavin (United States) Tommy Milner	Chevrolet Corvette C8.R	254	+19 Laps
9	GTLM	4	(United States) Corvette Racing	(United Kingdom) Oliver Gavin (United States) Tommy Milner	Chevrolet 5.5L V8	254	+19 Laps
10	GTLM	24	(United States) BMW Team RLL	(United States) John Edwards (Finland) Jesse Krohn	BMW M8 GTE	254	+19 Laps
10	GTLM	24	(United States) BMW Team RLL	(United States) John Edwards (Finland) Jesse Krohn	BMW S63 4.0L Turbo V8	254	+19 Laps
11	GTLM	911	(United States) Porsche GT Team	(France) Frédéric Makowiecki (United Kingdom) Nick Tandy	Porsche 911 RSR-19	254	+19 Laps
11	GTLM	911	(United States) Porsche GT Team	(France) Frédéric Makowiecki (United Kingdom) Nick Tandy	Porsche 4.2L Flat-6	254	+19 Laps
12	GTLM	3	(United States) Corvette Racing	(Spain) Antonio García (United States) Jordan Taylor	Chevrolet Corvette C8.R	254	+19 Laps
12	GTLM	3	(United States) Corvette Racing	(Spain) Antonio García (United States) Jordan Taylor	Chevrolet 5.5L V8	254	+19 Laps
13	GTLM	912	(United States) Porsche GT Team	(New Zealand) Earl Bamber (Belgium) Laurens Vanthoor	Porsche 911 RSR-19	252	+21 Laps
13	GTLM	912	(United States) Porsche GT Team	(New Zealand) Earl Bamber (Belgium) Laurens Vanthoor	Porsche 4.2L Flat-6	252	+21 Laps
14	**GTD**	**86**	**(United States) Meyer Shank Racing w/ Curb-Agajanian**	**(Germany) Mario Farnbacher (United States) Matt McMurry (Japan) Shinya Michimi**	**Acura NSX GT3 Evo**	**245**	**+28 Laps‡**
14	**GTD**	**86**	**(United States) Meyer Shank Racing w/ Curb-Agajanian**	**(Germany) Mario Farnbacher (United States) Matt McMurry (Japan) Shinya Michimi**	**Acura 3.5L Turbo V6**	**245**	**+28 Laps‡**
15	GTD	48	(United States) Paul Miller Racing	(United States) Corey Lewis (United States) Bryan Sellers (United States) Madison Snow	Lamborghini Huracán GT3 Evo	245	+28 Laps
15	GTD	48	(United States) Paul Miller Racing	(United States) Corey Lewis (United States) Bryan Sellers (United States) Madison Snow	Lamborghini 5.2L V10	245	+28 Laps
16	GTD	16	(United States) Wright Motorsports	(United States) Ryan Hardwick (Belgium) Jan Heylen (United States) Patrick Long	Porsche 911 GT3 R	245	+28 Laps
16	GTD	16	(United States) Wright Motorsports	(United States) Ryan Hardwick (Belgium) Jan Heylen (United States) Patrick Long	Porsche 4.0L Flat-6	245	+28 Laps
17	GTD	74	(United States) Riley Motorsports	(United States) Lawson Aschenbach (United States) Ben Keating (United States) Gar Robinson	Mercedes-AMG GT3 Evo	245	+28 Laps
17	GTD	74	(United States) Riley Motorsports	(United States) Lawson Aschenbach (United States) Ben Keating (United States) Gar Robinson	Mercedes-AMG M159 6.2L V8	245	+28 Laps
18	GTD	12	(Canada) AIM Vasser Sullivan	(United States) Townsend Bell (United States) Frankie Montecalvo (United States) Aaron Telitz	Lexus RC F GT3	245	+28 Laps
18	GTD	12	(Canada) AIM Vasser Sullivan	(United States) Townsend Bell (United States) Frankie Montecalvo (United States) Aaron Telitz	Lexus 5.0L V8	245	+28 Laps
19	GTD	23	(United States) Heart of Racing Team	(Canada) Roman De Angelis (United Kingdom) Ian James (United Kingdom) Darren Turner	Aston Martin Vantage GT3	245	+28 Laps
19	GTD	23	(United States) Heart of Racing Team	(Canada) Roman De Angelis (United Kingdom) Ian James (United Kingdom) Darren Turner	Aston Martin 4.0L Turbo V8	245	+28 Laps
20	GTD	57	(United States) Heinricher Racing w/ MSR Curb-Agajanian	(Canada) Mikhail Goikhberg (United States) Trent Hindman (Portugal) Álvaro Parente	Acura NSX GT3 Evo	244	+29 Laps
20	GTD	57	(United States) Heinricher Racing w/ MSR Curb-Agajanian	(Canada) Mikhail Goikhberg (United States) Trent Hindman (Portugal) Álvaro Parente	Acura 3.5L Turbo V6	244	+29 Laps
21	GTD	11	(Austria) GRT Grasser Racing Team	(United States) Richard Heistand (Netherlands) Steijn Schothorst (United Kingdom) Richard Westbrook	Lamborghini Huracán GT3 Evo	243	+30 Laps
21	GTD	11	(Austria) GRT Grasser Racing Team	(United States) Richard Heistand (Netherlands) Steijn Schothorst (United Kingdom) Richard Westbrook	Lamborghini 5.2L V10	243	+30 Laps
22	GTD	63	(United States) Scuderia Corsa	(United States) Cooper MacNeil (Finland) Toni Vilander (United States) Jeff Westphal	Ferrari 488 GT3	237	Crash
22	GTD	63	(United States) Scuderia Corsa	(United States) Cooper MacNeil (Finland) Toni Vilander (United States) Jeff Westphal	Ferrari F154CB 3.9L Turbo V8	237	Crash
23	LMP2	18	(United States) Era Motorsport	(United States) Colin Braun (United Kingdom) Kyle Tilley (United States) Dwight Merriman	Oreca 07	232	+41 Laps
23	LMP2	18	(United States) Era Motorsport	(United States) Colin Braun (United Kingdom) Kyle Tilley (United States) Dwight Merriman	Gibson 4.2L GK428 V8	232	+41 Laps
24	DPi	77	(Canada) Mazda Motorsports	(United Kingdom) Oliver Jarvis (United States) Tristan Nunez (France) Olivier Pla	Mazda RT24-P	230	+43 Laps
24	DPi	77	(Canada) Mazda Motorsports	(United Kingdom) Oliver Jarvis (United States) Tristan Nunez (France) Olivier Pla	Mazda MZ-2.0T 2.0L Turbo I4	230	+43 Laps
25	GTD	14	(Canada) AIM Vasser Sullivan	(United States) Michael de Quesada (United Kingdom) Jack Hawksworth (Canada) Daniel Morad	Lexus RC F GT3	204	+69 Laps
25	GTD	14	(Canada) AIM Vasser Sullivan	(United States) Michael de Quesada (United Kingdom) Jack Hawksworth (Canada) Daniel Morad	Lexus 5.0L V8	204	+69 Laps
26	GTD	96	(United States) Turner Motorsport	(United States) Bill Auberlen (United States) Robby Foley (United States) Dillon Machavern	BMW M6 GT3	182	Mechanical
26	GTD	96	(United States) Turner Motorsport	(United States) Bill Auberlen (United States) Robby Foley (United States) Dillon Machavern	BMW 4.4L Turbo V8	182	Mechanical
27	GTD	44	(United States) GRT Magnus	(United States) Andy Lally (United States) John Potter (United States) Spencer Pumpelly	Lamborghini Huracán GT3 Evo	166	Crash
27	GTD	44	(United States) GRT Magnus	(United States) Andy Lally (United States) John Potter (United States) Spencer Pumpelly	Lamborghini 5.2L V10	166	Crash
28	DPi	85	(United States) JDC-Miller MotorSports	(Brazil) Matheus Leist (South Africa) Stephen Simpson	Cadillac DPi-V.R	54	Rear End
28	DPi	85	(United States) JDC-Miller MotorSports	(Brazil) Matheus Leist (South Africa) Stephen Simpson	Cadillac 5.5L V8	54	Rear End

== Standings after the race ==
DPi Drivers' Championship standings
Pos.	+/–	Driver	Points
1		(Australia) Ryan Briscoe (Netherlands) Renger van der Zande	150
2		(France) Sébastien Bourdais (Portugal) João Barbosa	146
3	1	(Brazil) Pipo Derani	145
4	1	(United States) Jonathan Bomarito (United Kingdom) Harry Tincknell	144
5	2	(United Kingdom) Oliver Jarvis (United States) Tristan Nunez	141

LMP2 Drivers' Championship standings
Pos.	+/–	Driver	Points
1	1	(United States) Patrick Kelly	98
2	2	(United States) Dwight Merriman (United Kingdom) Kyle Tilley	92
3	2	(Canada) Cameron Cassels	64
4	6	(Switzerland) Simon Trummer	63
5	2	(Sweden) Henrik Hedman	61

GTLM Drivers' Championship standings
Pos.	+/–	Driver	Points
1		(Spain) Antonio García (United States) Jordan Taylor	191
2	1	(United Kingdom) Oliver Gavin (United States) Tommy Milner	177
3	3	(United States) Connor De Phillippi (Canada) Bruno Spengler	174
4	1	(United States) John Edwards (Finland) Jesse Krohn	174
5	3	(New Zealand) Earl Bamber (Belgium) Laurens Vanthoor	171

GTD Drivers' Championship standings
Pos.	+/–	Driver	Points
1	1	(Germany) Mario Farnbacher (United States) Matt McMurry	150
2	1	(United States) Aaron Telitz	138
3	2	(United Kingdom) Jack Hawksworth	136
4		(United States) Townsend Bell (United States) Frankie Montecalvo	134
5	1	(United States) Ryan Hardwick (United States) Patrick Long	134

- Note: Only the top five positions are included for all sets of standings.

DPi Teams' Championship standings
Pos.	+/–	Team	Points
1		(United States) #10 Konica Minolta Cadillac DPi-V.R	150
2		(United States) #5 Mustang Sampling Racing / JDC-Miller MotorSports	146
3	1	(United States) #31 Whelen Engineering Racing	145
4	1	(Canada) #55 Mazda Motorsports	144
5	2	(Canada) #77 Mazda Motorsports	141

LMP2 Teams' Championship standings
Pos.	+/–	Team	Points
1	1	(United States) #52 PR1/Mathiasen Motorsports	98
2	2	(United States) #18 Era Motorsport	92
3	2	(United States) #38 Performance Tech Motorsports	64
4	1	(United States) #81 DragonSpeed USA	61
5		(United States) #8 Tower Motorsport by Starworks	28

GTLM Teams' Championship standings
Pos.	+/–	Team	Points
1		(United States) #3 Corvette Racing	191
2	1	(United States) #4 Corvette Racing	177
3	3	(United States) #25 BMW Team RLL	174
4	1	(United States) #24 BMW Team RLL	171
5	3	(United States) #912 Porsche GT Team	171

GTD Teams' Championship standings
Pos.	+/–	Team	Points
1	1	(United States) #86 Meyer Shank Racing with Curb-Agajanian	150
2	1	(Canada) #14 AIM Vasser Sullivan	136
3		(Canada) #12 AIM Vasser Sullivan	134
4	1	(United States) #16 Wright Motorsports	134
5	2	(United States) #74 Riley Motorsports	128

- Note: Only the top five positions are included for all sets of standings.

DPi Manufacturers' Championship standings
Pos.	+/–	Manufacturer	Points
1		(United States) Cadillac	164
2		(Japan) Mazda	161
3		(Japan) Acura	160

GTLM Manufacturers' Championship standings
Pos.	+/–	Manufacturer	Points
1		(United States) Chevrolet	202
2		(Germany) BMW	194
3		(Germany) Porsche	186
4		(Italy) Ferrari	28

GTD Manufacturers' Championship standings
Pos.	+/–	Manufacturer	Points
1	1	(Japan) Acura	156
2	1	(Japan) Lexus	148
3	2	(Italy) Lamborghini	140
4		(Germany) Porsche	140
5	1	(Germany) BMW	136

- Note: Only the top five positions are included for all sets of standings.

IMSA SportsCar Championship
Previous race: 2020 Michelin GT Challenge at VIR	2020 season	Next race: 2020 Acura Sports Car Challenge at Mid-Ohio
