= BMW M8 GTE =

Sports car made by BMW

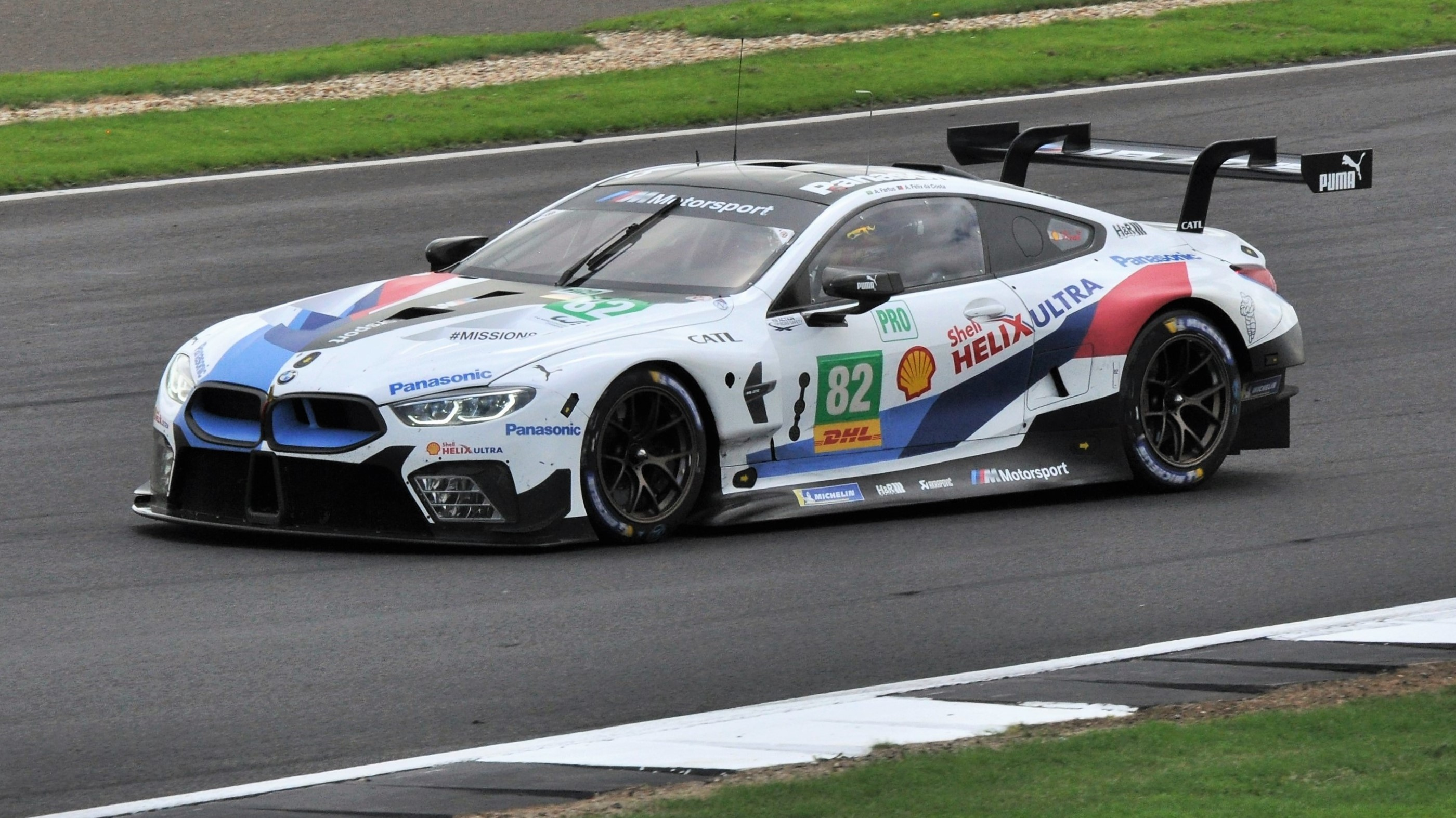
- BMW M8 GTE, run by BMW Team MTEK, at the 2018 6 Hours of Silverstone race
- Category: LM GTE (FIA WEC); GTLM (IMSA WTSC)
- Constructor: BMW
- Designers: Michael Scully (Head of Design, BMW Motorsport)
- Predecessor: BMW M6 GTLM
- Successor: BMW M4 GT3

Technical specifications
- Chassis: Carbon-fibre monocoque with safety roll cage
- Suspension (front): Pushrod with double wishbones coupled with ZF Sachs dampers
- Suspension (rear): Same as front
- Length: 4,980 mm (196 in) excluding rear wing
- Width: 2,224 mm (88 in)
- Height: 1,212 mm (48 in)
- Wheelbase: 2,880 mm (113 in)
- Engine: BMW P63/1 3,981 cc (243 cu in) 90° V8 twin-turbocharged, front-mid engine, rear-wheel-drive, longitudinally mounted
- Transmission: Xtrac 6-speed sequential semi-automatic paddle-shift
- Power: 600 PS (441 kW; 592 hp) at 7,000 rpm (estimated)
- Weight: 1,250 kg (2,756 lb) including driver
- Fuel: Total Excellium Endurance Ethanol E20 (FIA WEC, 24 Hours of Le Mans) and VP Racing Fuels (WeatherTech SportsCar Championship)
- Lubricants: Shell Helix Ultra/Pennzoil Ultra
- Brakes: Brembo carbon brake discs with 6-piston calipers and pads
- Tyres: Michelin Pilot Sport

Competition history
- Notable entrants: (Germany) BMW Team MTEK (United States) BMW Team Rahal Letterman Lanigan
- Notable drivers: (United States) Connor De Phillippi; (United States) John Edwards; (Finland) Jesse Krohn; (Netherlands) Nick Catsburg; (Brazil) Augusto Farfus; (United Kingdom) Alexander Sims; (United States) Bill Auberlen; (Austria) Philipp Eng; (Germany) Martin Tomczyk; (Portugal) António Félix da Costa; (United Kingdom) Tom Blomqvist; (Italy) Alex Zanardi; (United States) Colton Herta; (Australia) Chaz Mostert; (Canada) Bruno Spengler
- Debut: 2018 24 Hours of Daytona
- First win: 2018 Oak Tree Grand Prix
- Last win: 2020 TireRack.com Grand Prix at Road Atlanta
- Last event: 2021 Petit Le Mans
Races	Wins	Poles	F/Laps
37 (IMSA SportsCar); 8 (FIA WEC)	5 (IMSA SportsCar); 0 (FIA WEC)	2 (IMSA SportsCar); 0 (FIA WEC)	3 (IMSA SportsCar); 0 (FIA WEC)
- Constructors' Championships: 0 (IMSA SportsCar); 0 (FIA WEC)
- Drivers' Championships: 0 (IMSA SportsCar); 0 (FIA WEC)

The BMW M8 GTE is an endurance grand tourer (GT) car constructed by the German automobile manufacturer BMW. It was developed in late 2016 and made its competitive début in IMSA WeatherTech SportsCar Championship and the FIA World Endurance Championship for the 2018 season, and thus marking BMW Motorsport's return to 24 Hours of Le Mans after a six-year hiatus. The M8 GTE, which replaced the ongoing BMW M6 GTLM at the end of the 2017 season, is based on the BMW M8. The car was unveiled on 12 September 2017 at the Frankfurt Motor Show, Germany.

== Development ==
BMW began the development, design, and construction of the M8 GTE in mid-2016. The first chassis was assembled in June 2017, with the first vehicle completed in July. The M8 GTE is the first car manufactured by BMW Motorsport from the ground up as a LM GTE homologated vehicle, rather than based on an existing design.

== Technical features ==
The BMW M8 GTE programme utilizes several cutting-edge technologies and concepts, such as Additive Manufacturing for rapid prototyping of components, as well as a transaxle, integrating the transmission, driveshaft, and axle assembly into a single unit, balancing mass front to rear.

The M8 GTE is powered by a front-mid mounted BMW P63/1 turbocharged V8 engine, the motorsport variant of the S63 motor found in roadgoing BMW models such as the F90 M5, as well as the BMW 8 Series (G15).

== Competition History ==
=== Complete IMSA SportsCar Championship results ===
(key) Races in bold indicates pole position. Races in italics indicates fastest lap.

Complete IMSA SportsCar Championship results
Year	Entrant	Class	Drivers	No.	Rds.	Rounds												Pts.	Pos.
Year	Entrant	Class	Drivers	No.	Rds.	1	2	3	4	5	6	7	8	9	10	11	12	Pts.	Pos.
2018	(United States) BMW Team RLL	GTLM	(United States) John Edwards (Finland) Jesse Krohn (Netherlands) Nick Catsburg (Brazil) Augusto Farfus (United Kingdom) Tom Blomqvist (Australia) Chaz Mostert	24	All; All; 1-2; 1; 6; 12	DAY; 7	SEB; 7	LBH; 5	MOH; 7	WGL; 8	MOS; 8	LIM; 8	ELK; 8	VIR; 3	LGA; 4	ATL; 3		278	8th
2018	(United States) BMW Team RLL	GTLM	(United States) Connor De Phillippi (United Kingdom) Alexander Sims (United States) Bill Auberlen (Austria) Philipp Eng	25	All; All; 1-2, 6, 12; 1	DAY; 9	SEB; 2	LBH; 8	MOH; 2	WGL; 7	MOS; 7	LIM; 7	ELK; 6	VIR; 1	LGA; 1	ATL; 4		304	6th
2019	(United States) BMW Team RLL	GTLM	(United States) John Edwards (Finland) Jesse Krohn (Australia) Chaz Mostert (Italy) Alex Zanardi (Austria) Philipp Eng	24	All; All; 1; 1; 2, 12	DAY; 9	SEB; 4	LBH; 8	MOH; 6	WGL; 5	MOS; 2	LIM; 8	ELK; 8	VIR; 8	LGA; 2	ATL; 9		279	7th
2019	(United States) BMW Team RLL	GTLM	(United States) Connor De Phillippi (United States) Colton Herta (Austria) Philipp Eng (Brazil) Augusto Farfus (United Kingdom) Tom Blomqvist	25	All; 1-2, 12; 1; 1; 2-4, 6-12	DAY; 1	SEB; 7	LBH; 7	MOH; 4	WGL; 7	MOS; 4	LIM; 7	ELK; 5	VIR; 7	LGA; 5	ATL; 3		293	6th
2020	(United States) BMW Team RLL	GTLM	(United States) John Edwards (Finland) Jesse Krohn (Brazil) Augusto Farfus (Australia) Chaz Mostert	24	All; All; 1, 9, 11; 1	DAY 1; 1	DAY 2; 6	SEB 1; 5	ELK; 3	VIR; 6	ATL 1; 3	MOH; 4	CLT; 2	ATL 2; 3	LGA; 4	SEB 2; 3		319	2nd
2020	(United States) BMW Team RLL	GTLM	(United States) Connor De Phillippi (Canada) Bruno Spengler (United States) Colton Herta (Austria) Philipp Eng	25	All; All; 1, 9, 11; 1	DAY 1; 5	DAY 2; 4	SEB 1; 4	ELK; 6	VIR; 2	ATL 1; 1	MOH; 3	CLT; 3	ATL 2; 6	LGA; 5	SEB 2; 4		313	4th
2021	(United States) BMW Team RLL	GTLM	(United States) John Edwards (Brazil) Augusto Farfus (Finland) Jesse Krohn (Germany) Marco Wittmann	24	1-2, 5, 12; 1-2, 5, 12; 1, 9, 11; 1	DAY 1; 6	DAY 2; 3	SEB; 3	BEL	WGL 1; 2	WGL 2	LIM	ELK	LGA	LBH	VIR	ATL; 3	1336	4th
2021	(United States) BMW Team RLL	GTLM	(United States) Connor De Phillippi (Austria) Philipp Eng (Canada) Bruno Spengler (Germany) Timo Glock	25	1-2, 5, 12; 1-2, 5, 12; 1, 9, 11; 1	DAY 1; 5	DAY 2; 5	SEB; 2	BEL	WGL 1; 3	WGL 2	LIM	ELK	LGA	LBH	VIR	ATL; 5	1251	5th

=== Complete FIA World Endurance Championship results ===
(key) Races in bold indicates pole position. Races in italics indicates fastest lap.

Complete FIA World Endurance Championship results
Year	Entrant	Class	Drivers	No.	Rds.	Rounds								Pts.	Pos.
Year	Entrant	Class	Drivers	No.	Rds.	1	2	3	4	5	6	7	8	Pts.	Pos.
2018–19	(Germany) BMW Team MTEK	LMGTE Pro	(Netherlands) Nicky Catsburg (Germany) Martin Tomczyk (Austria) Philipp Eng (United Kingdom) Alexander Sims	81	All; All; 2,8; 6	SPA; 8	LMS; 11	SIL; 5	FUJ; 7	SHA; 9	SEB; 2	SPA; 9	LMS; 13	114	5th
2018–19	(Germany) BMW Team MTEK	LMGTE Pro	(Portugal) António Félix da Costa (United Kingdom) Tom Blomqvist (Brazil) Augusto Farfus (United Kingdom) Alexander Sims (Canada) Bruno Spengler (Finland) Jesse Krohn	82	All; 1, 4-5; 2-3, 6-8; 2; 6; 8	SPA; 5	LMS; RET	SIL; RET	FUJ; 2	SHA; 11	SEB; 7	SPA; 4	LMS; 10	114	5th

== Gallery ==
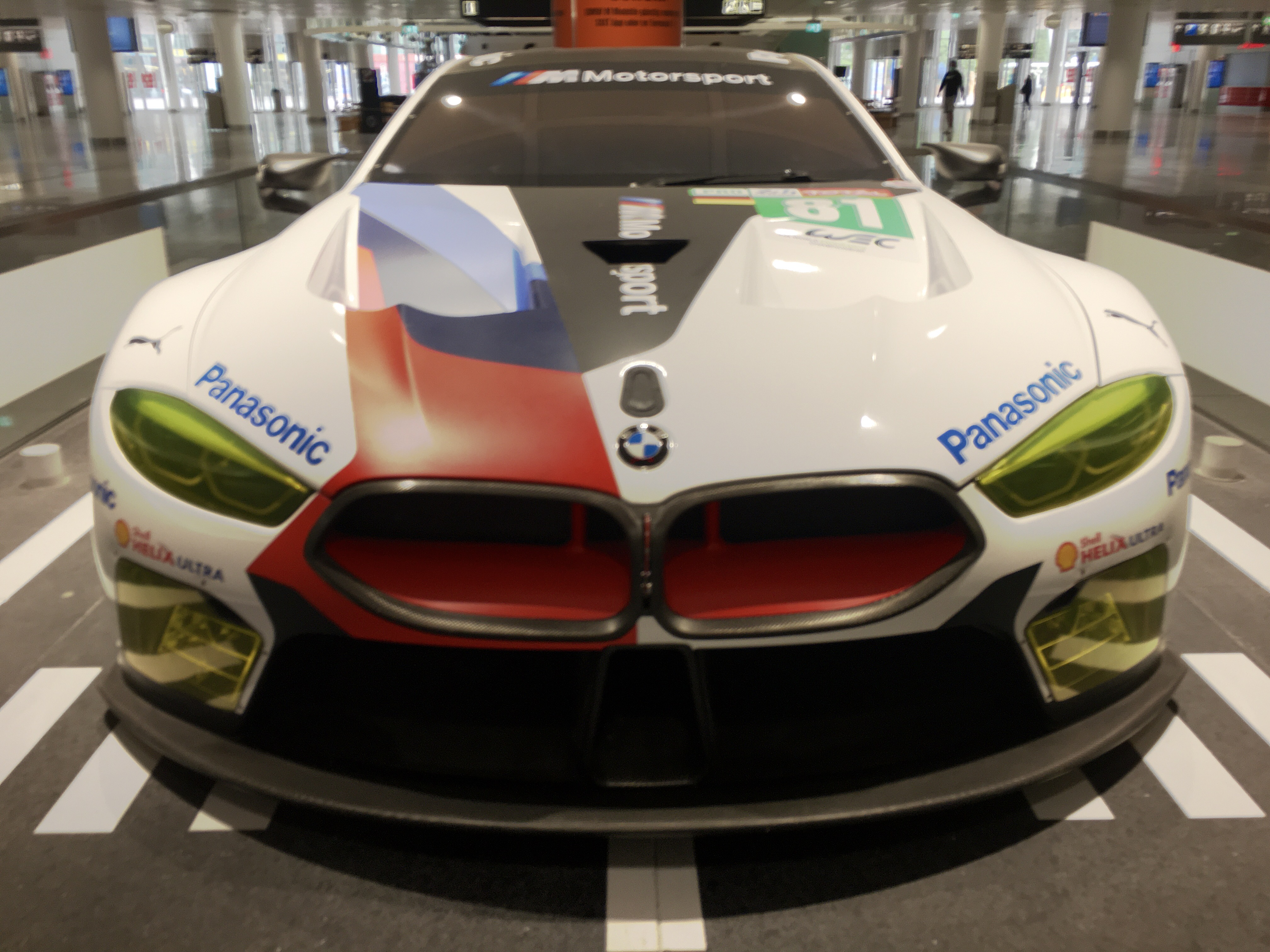

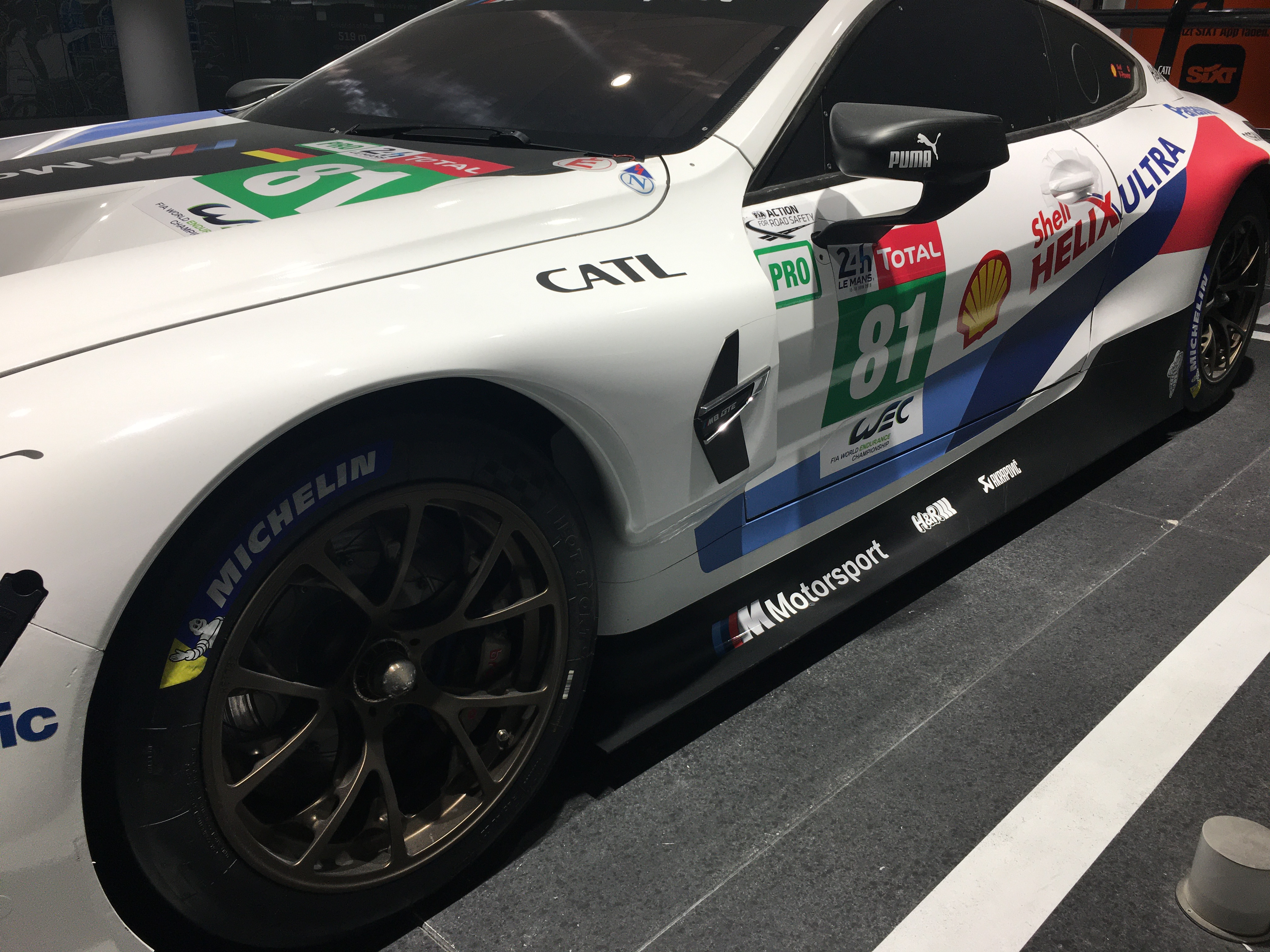

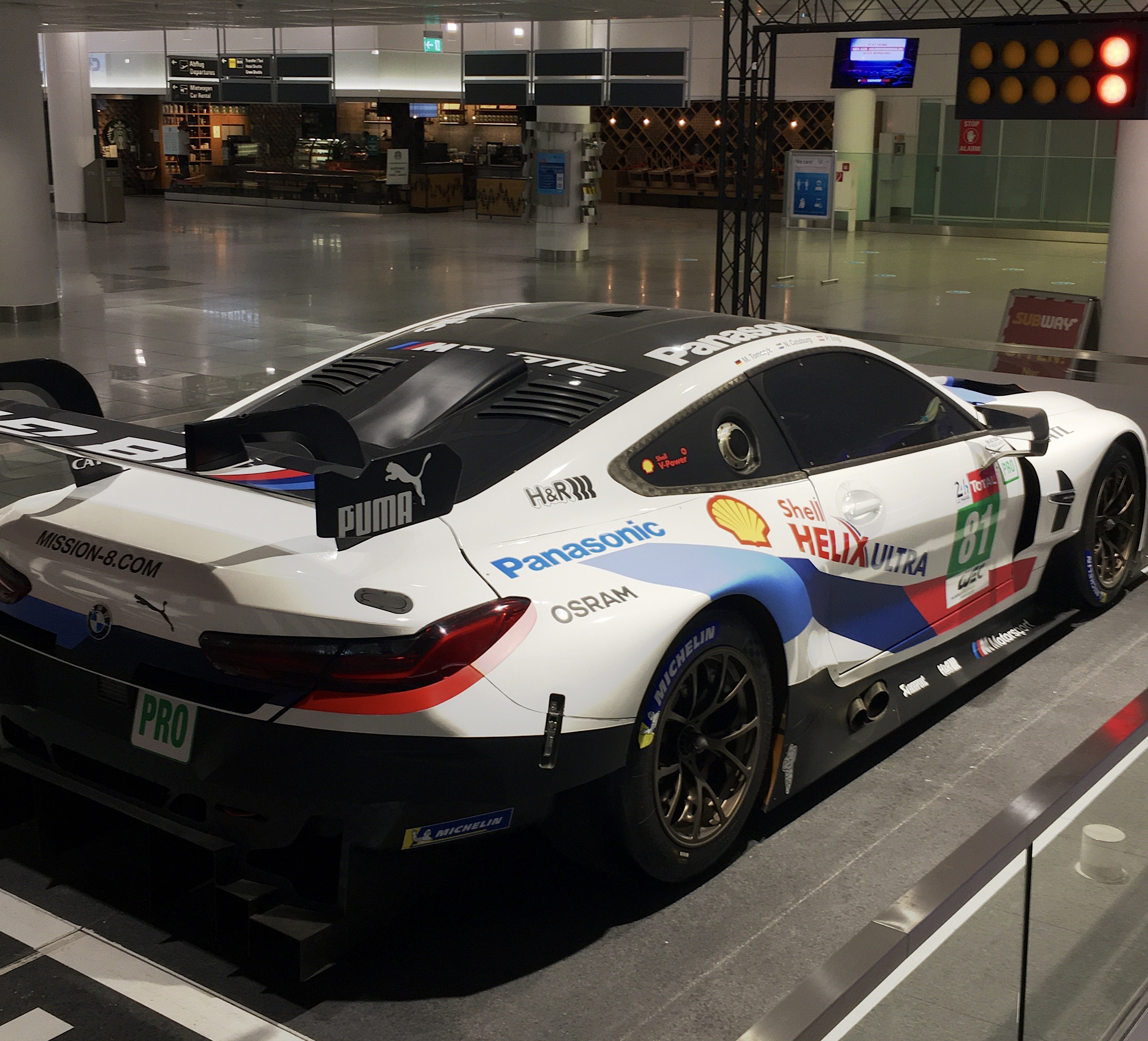

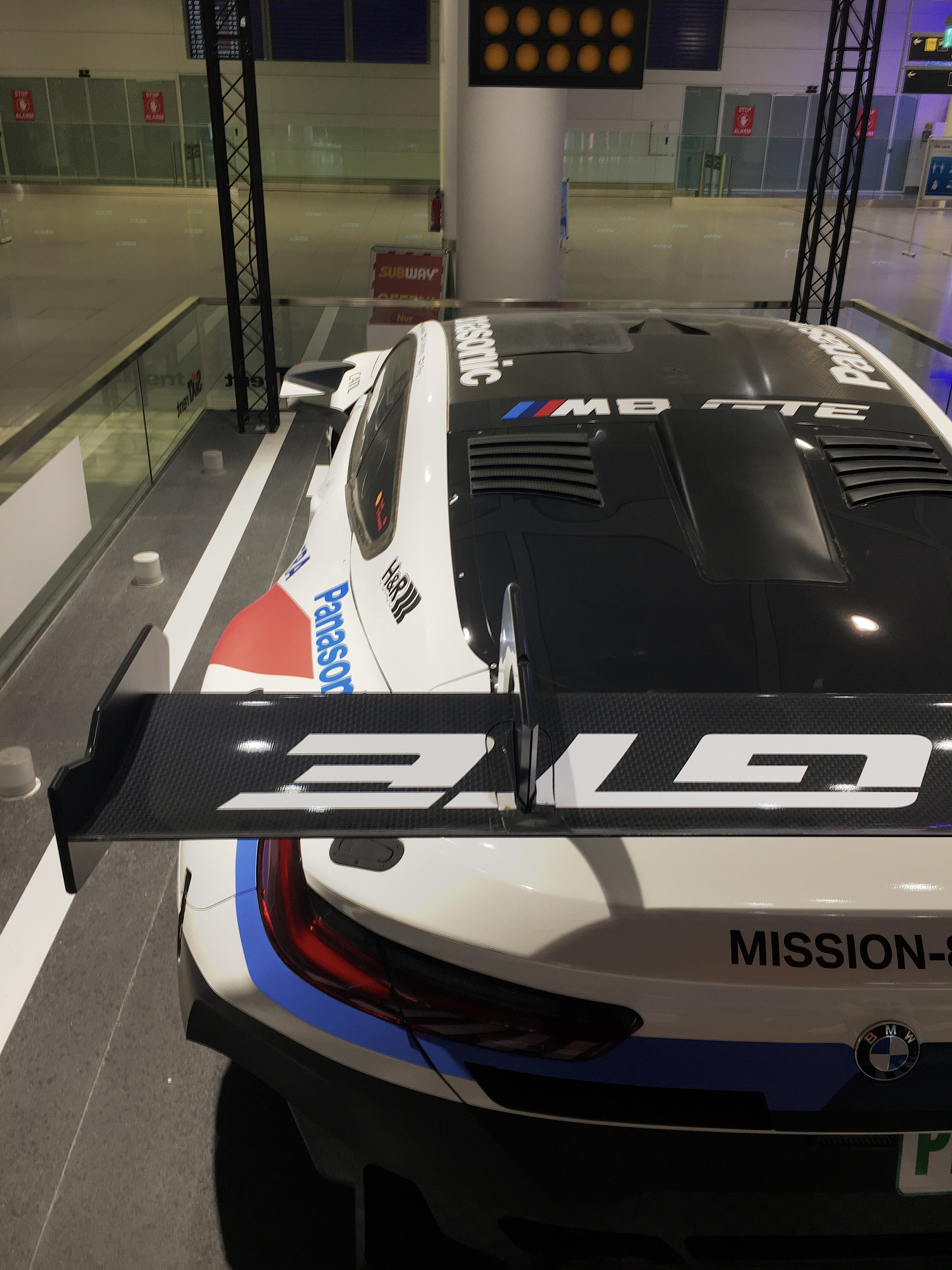

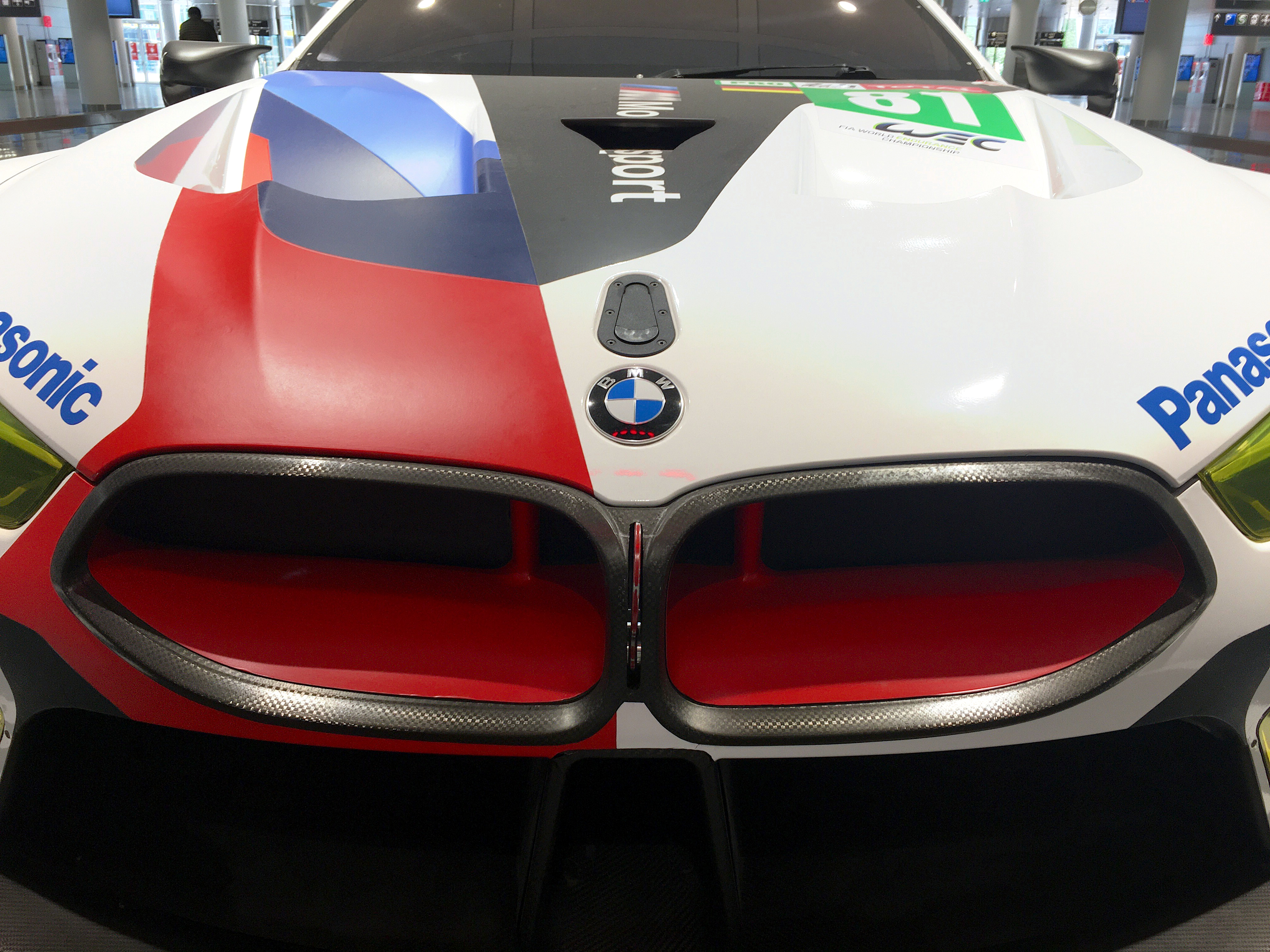

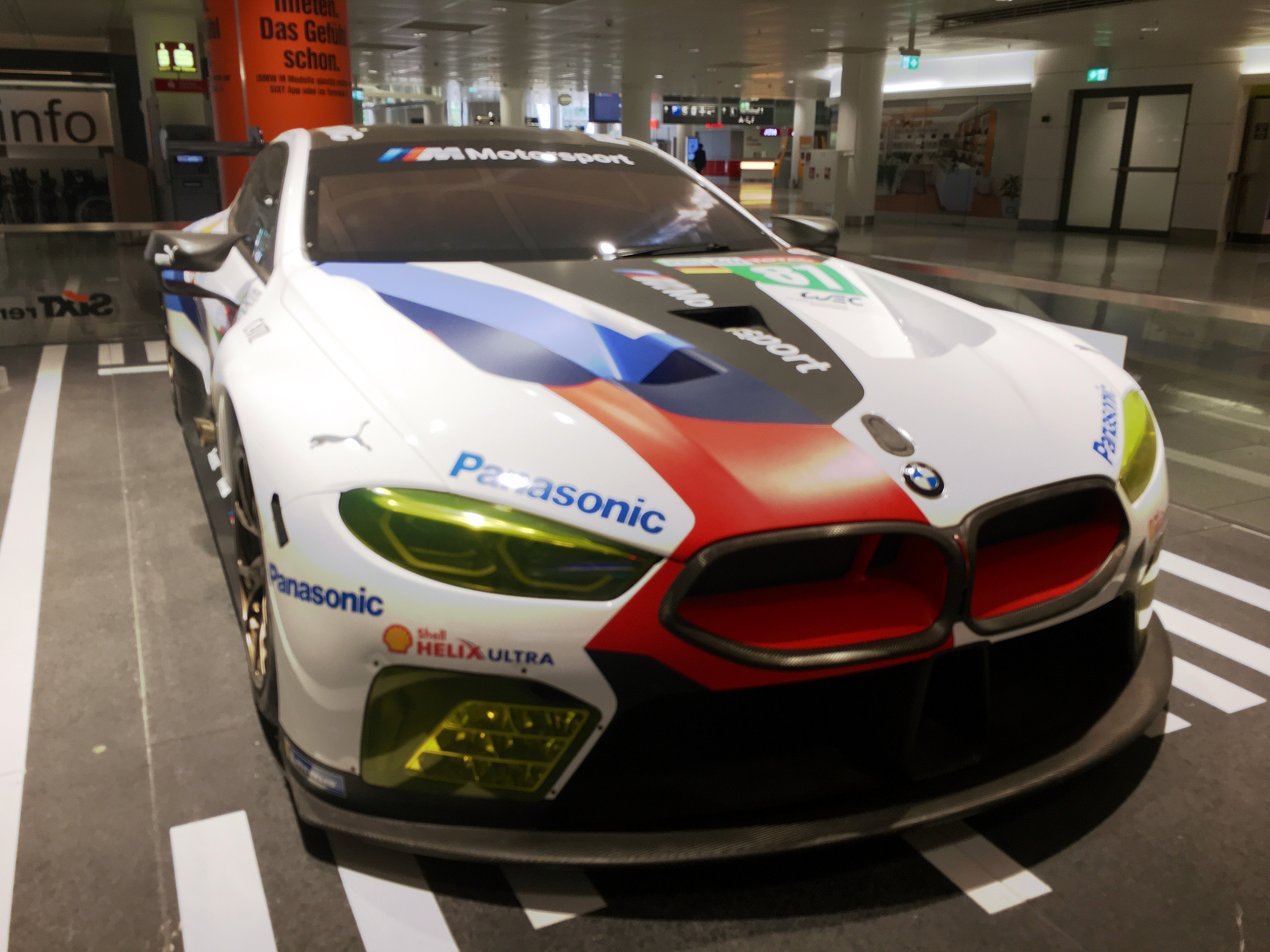

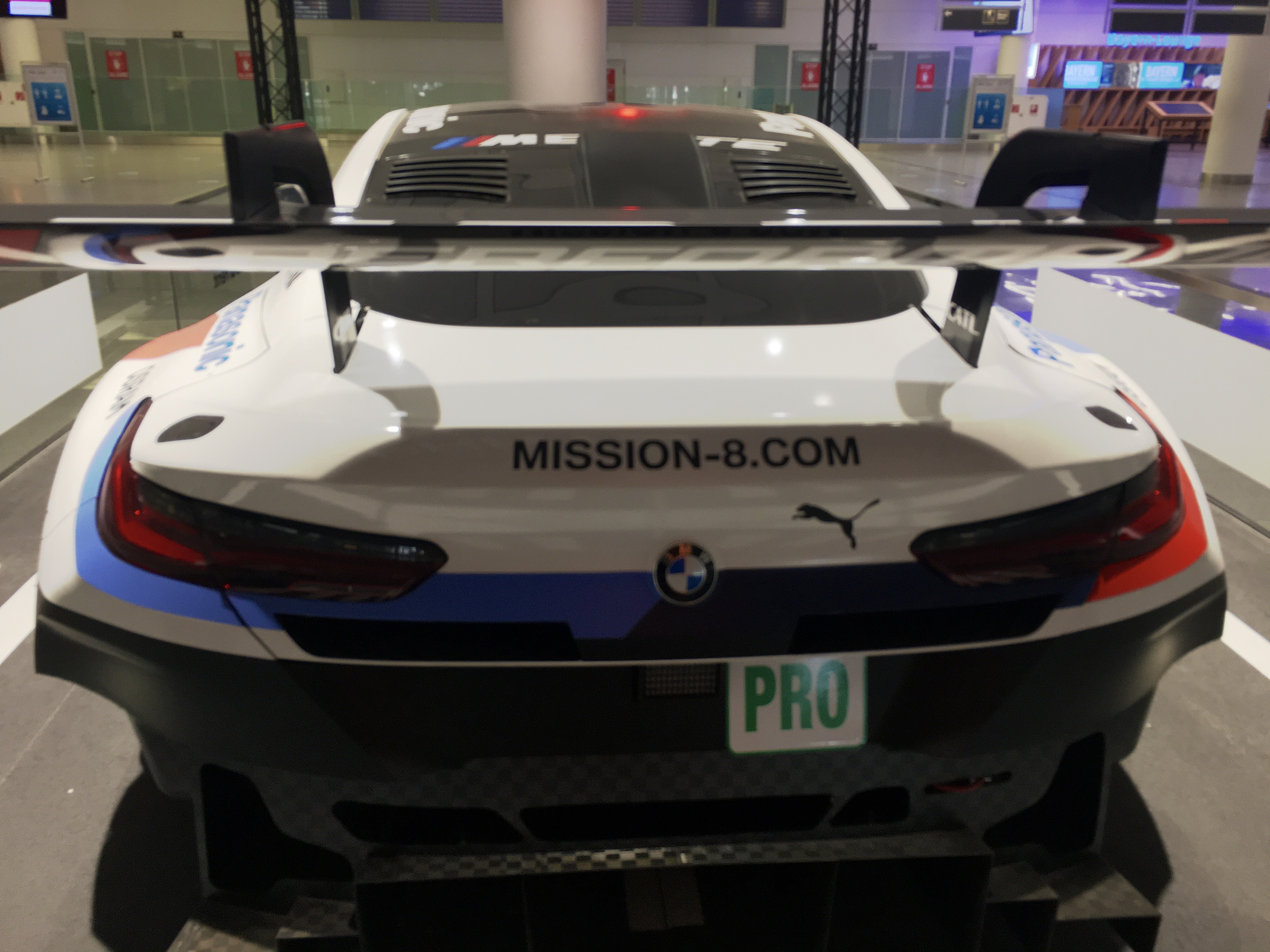
