= Autoracing Club Bratislava =

(Slovakia) ARC Bratislava
- Founded: 1997
- Founder(s): Miro Konôpka; Dušan Vysloužil
- Base: Bratislava, Slovakia
- Team principal(s): Miro Konôpka
- Current series: 24H Series; GT Cup Series / FIA CEZ; Asian Le Mans Series
- Former series: Porsche Supercup; FIA GT Championship; American Le Mans Series; Le Mans Series; Blancpain Endurance Series; Lamborghini Super Trofeo; International GT Open; TCR Eastern Europe Trophy; FIA World Endurance Championship; Le Mans Virtual Series; Ultimate Cup Series
- Current drivers: (Slovakia) Miro Konôpka (Slovakia) Zdeno Mikuláško (Slovakia) Adam Konôpka (Slovakia) Maťo Konôpka; Asian Le Mans Series: (France) Yann Ehrlacher (France) Matthieu Vaxivière
- Teams' Championships: Asian Le Mans Series: 2018–19 (LMP2 Am); 24H Series Europe: 2020 (GTX)
- Drivers' Championships: ESET V4 Cup: 2013; 2014; 2016: Miro Konôpka; Asian Le Mans Series: 2018–19 (LMP2 Am): Miro Konôpka/Ling/Burke; 24H Series Europe: 2020 (GTX): Konôpka/Konôpka/Homola
- Website: arcbratislava.sk

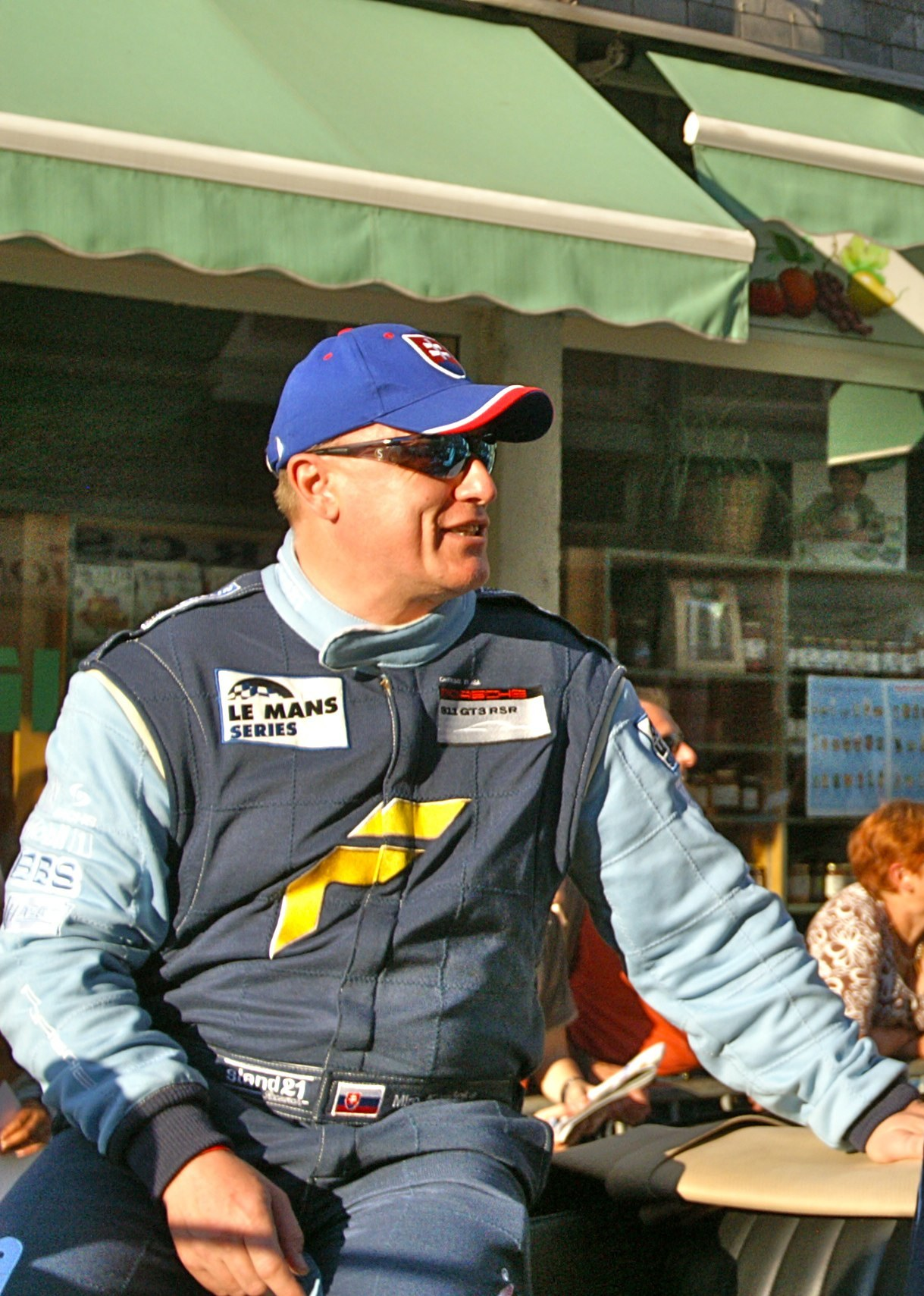
Miro Konôpka has been driving for the team since its inception, but had also competed individually for other teams, most notably at 24 Hours of Le Mans events (pictured in 2010 as part of Team Felbermayr-Proton).

Autoracing Club Bratislava, also known as ARC Bratislava, is an auto racing team based in Slovakia. The team is led by Miro Konôpka, who has been driving for the team since its inception. ARC Bratislava are best known for competing in the FIA World Endurance Championship's short-lived LMP2 Pro-Am class and also the Asian Le Mans Series, where they spent nine consecutive seasons between 2015 and 2024, with the team set to return for the 2025–26 season. The team has competed in various FIA, ACO or SRO-sanctioned championships throughout its existence, using various prototypes or GT cars. They are also semi-regular visitors of the 24H Series.

ARC Bratislava also compete on the local scene, most notably in the FIA Central European Zone Circuit Championship and specifically in its derived championship called the GT Cup Series (previously known as the ESET V4 Cup or the ESET Cup Series), where Konôpka is a three-time overall champion.

ARC Bratislava have been active on the esports scene as well, competing in the Le Mans Virtual Series in both seasons of this championship between 2021 and 2023.

== History ==
The team was formed in 1997 by Miro Konôpka and Dušan Vysloužil to boost their racing efforts. After initially competing in local series, the team has since moved onto international competition. The team has competed in various forms of motorsport like hill climb racing, rallying but most importantly circuit racing. Their first notable international entry was the 2003 Porsche Supercup. In 2005, the team entered the FIA GT Championship, staying there until the 2009 season. The team has also competed twice in the American Le Mans Series, entering the 2007 and 2008 editions of 12 Hours of Sebring, as well as making a one-off appearance in the 2009 Le Mans Series.

=== 24H Series ===
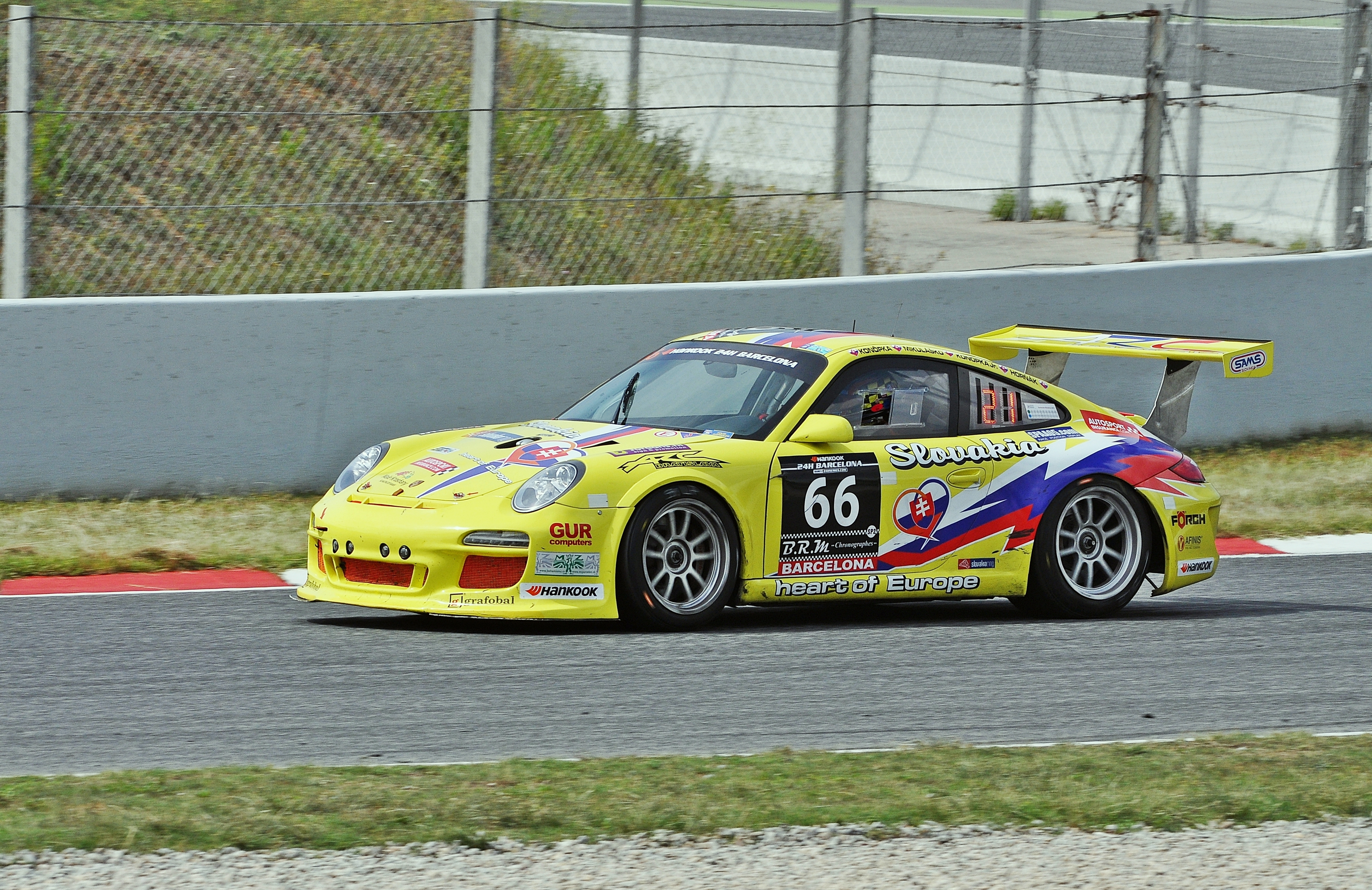
ARC Bratislava scored a class win at the 2015 24 Hours of Barcelona with this Porsche 997 Cup S.

ARC Bratislava are semi-regular visitors to the Dubai 24 Hour event which preceded and is now part of the 24H Series. In the inaugural edition of the event, the team fielded a Porsche GT3 in the A6 class with the lineup of Konôpka, Gene Sigal, Matthew Alhadeff and Jirko Malchárek. The team entered as AC Bratislava finished third overall and second in their respective class. The team, now entered under its full name Autoracing Club Bratislava, returned with the same car and a slightly different lineup of Konôpka, Malchárek and two new drivers in Jim Michaelian and Mauro Casadei for the 2007 edition. This time around, the team finished fifth overall and fourth in the A6 class.

The team was also part of the inaugural season of the 24H Series in 2008. After completing just 53 laps, the team was classified in a very low 85th place in the 2008 Dubai 24 Hour. Konôpka and Michaelian were joined by German drivers Jürgen Bender and Martin Dechent for the event. In 2008 and 2010, Konôpka's team had also contested the 12-hour endurance race held at the Hungaroring, finishing fourth overall in the latter edition. For 2009, the team's involvement was reduced to just the Dubai race where the lineup of Konôpka, Oliver Morley, Sean Edwards and Richard Cvörnjek finished fourth overall and earned another class podium with a third place. In their fifth consecutive Dubai appearance in 2010 with an unchanged lineup from the previous year, the team could only manage 87 laps, which resulted in 72nd place overall and also the last place in the A6 class.

ARC Bratislava missed the 2011 Dubai 24 Hour because Konôpka contested it with a different team. Konôpka returned with his own team for the 2012 edition alongside Teo Myszkowski, Andrzej Lewandowski and Marco Schelp. In another compromised outing, the team finished 53rd overall and 24th in the A6 class. In addition to Dubai, the team entered the 2012 24 Hours of Barcelona. It was a very successful race as the team finished third overall and more importantly first in their class. The team fielded a Porsche 997 Cup with a five-driver lineup consisting of Konôpka, his son Maťo Konôpka, Ivo Breukers, Wolf Nathan and Jaap van Lagen.

After a two-year hiatus, ARC Bratislava returned to 24H Series by competing in two rounds of the 2015 season. Konôpka did not miss the 2013, 2014 and 2015 editions of Dubai however, as well as the second and third round of the 2015 season, once again racing individually for other teams. ARC Bratislava then entered the fourth and fifth round of the season, which were held at Circuit Paul Ricard and Barcelona respectively. The team once again won in its class in Barcelona. Now part of the SP2 class, the team entered an all-Slovak lineup of the two Konôpkas, Zdeno Mikuláško and Miro Horňák.

After multiple seasons out of the series, ARC Bratislava once again returned in 2020, this time entering the 12 Hours of Monza. After years of using Porsche machinery, the team has now switched to Lamborghini Huracán Super Trofeo, which was also in use for their activities in the Lamborghini Super Trofeo Europe series. The two Konôpkas were joined by Maťo Homola and this trio ended up winning the GTX class with a sixth place overall. This win also meant a gold trophy in the GTX Teams' Europe Series. The team failed to finish their 2021 return to Dubai after completing 441 laps, which was still enough for third place in the GTX class. The lineup consisted of Miro and Maťo Konôpka, Justas Jonušis, Thomas Padovani and Zdeno Mikuláško.

For the 2022 season, ARC Bratislava have registered for the Dubai 24 Hour and the following non-championship six-hour race in Abu Dhabi, bringing their Lamborghini Huracán GT3 to be driven by the lineup of Miro and Maťo Konôpka, Zdeno Mikuláško, the returning Andrzej Lewandowski and Tom Jackson, who previously drove for the team in the 2021 FIA World Endurance Championship. The team was part of the GT3-Am class for Dubai, finishing fifth out of nine entries while completing 572 laps which was enough for 18th place in overall standings. Only the Konôpkas then took part in the Abu Dhabi race despite Lewandowski also being on the initial entry list. In the joint GT3 class for this event, ARC Bratislava qualified and also finished in sixth position, which was also their overall result. ARC Bratislava took part in one more 24H Series event of 2022, making an appearance at the inaugural 12 Hours of Kuwait. Miro and Maťo Konôpka were once again joined by Zdeno Mikuláško. The team suffered multiple punctures in the race, the first one making them drop from overall lead just few minutes into the race. They were the final team to be classified, completing 182 laps which put them in 20th place. Mikuláško also posted the fastest lap of the race in his final stint.

Miro Konôpka along with Andrzej Lewandowski then returned for the 2023 6 Hours of Abu Dhabi. As the sole competitor in GT3 Am, the team won their class by default, while also finishing tenth overall. ARC Bratislava would once again return for the 2024 edition of the event, with Konôpka partnering long-time team affiliate Mikuláško and newcomer Petr Fulín in the GT3 Am class. They would go on to finish 17th overall in the race, six laps down on the GT3 leader, while finishing in fifth out of GT3 Am entries. The team's next race in the series was the 12 Hours of Spa-Francorchamps, which was held as a two-part race on 20 and 21 April 2024. Konôpka and Mikuláško were joined by fellow Slovak driver Anton Kiaba and Guatemalan junior Mateo Llarena. Despite leading in the early stages of the race, the team was subsequently falling down the order, eventually only finishing 26th overall after a stoppage in the ninth hour due to puncture.

For the 2025 Middle East Trophy, much like in the previous season, ARC Bratislava would only contest the 6 Hours of Abu Dhabi by fielding the Evo version of the Huracán GT3, this time with the family trio of Miro, Maťo and Adam Konôpka behind the wheel. They did not finish the race, but were still classified in 31st overall place, even improving on their GT3 Am result from previous year, now being classified in fourth. The team then entered the first race of the European leg of the 2025 24H Series, which was the 12 Hours of Mugello. The team continued to run the same car in the same class, however there was a change in the driver lineup. Miro Konôpka was joined by the returning Zdeno Mikuláško and two new drivers in Gerhard Tweraser and Jiatong Liang. The team took advantage of the mixed conditions and mostly managed to avoid incidents, which landed them a sixth place overall and a second place in GT3 Am class. For 12 Hours of Spa-Francorchamps, ARC Bratislava introduced the Huracán GT3 Evo 2 for the first time, however they had to retire the car just four laps into the race after Andrzej Lewandowski spun at Raidillon corner. They were allowed to rejoin the second part of the race, however had to be moved to an SP4 class, as they went back to the older and now unhomologated Evo version of the Huracán. The lineup of Miro Konôpka, Adam Konôpka and Jiatong Liang managed to complete over half of race distance and therefore were classified in 32nd place overall. Lewandowski did not drive in this portion of the race.

The team started their 2026 campaign by contesting the 6 Hours of Abu Dhabi in an unchanged lineup from previous year's event. After causing a collision with fellow GT3 team Scuderia Praha, the team fell down the order and only managed to finish 33rd overall, nine laps down compared to the winning car. For the start of the European leg at the 12 Hours of Mugello, the team originally planned to use the same trio as in Abu Dhabi, but eventually replaced Maťo Konôpka with Zdeno Mikuláško and also added Gerhard Tweraser to make up a four-driver crew. The team had a very successful outing, scoring GT3 Am class pole in qualifying, which they managed to convert into a class win and a third place overall in the race, two laps down on the overall winner.

=== Blancpain Endurance Series ===
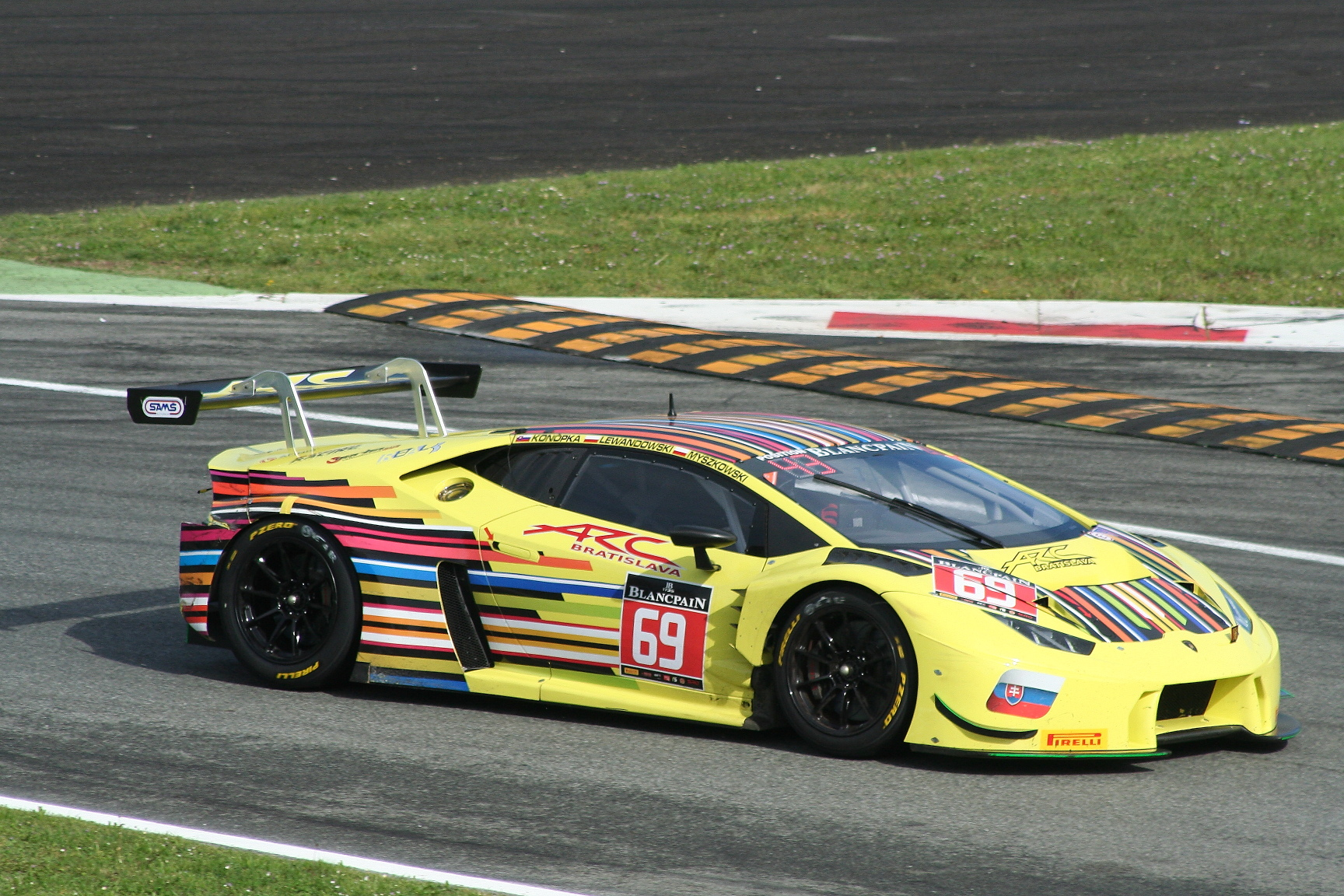
ARC Bratislava at the 2016 3 Hours of Monza where they finished third in the Am Cup with their Lamborghini Huracán GT3.

In addition to the 24H Series, the team has started appearing in the Blancpain Endurance Series. 2012 was their debut season where they entered the Pro-Am Cup. ARC's first Blancpain season ended at the 24 Hours of Spa, where the Porsche 997 GT3-R driven by the quartet of Konôpka, Mikuláško, Stefano Crotti and Christoff Corten failed to finish the race after completing 305 laps. The team also failed to score a point in the whole season. In 2013, ARC Bratislava contested the full season. Konôpka along with Ahmad Al Harthy drove the Porsche in all five races, with Ján Raška and Marco Schelp joining them for Spa. The team was now moved to the Gentlemen Trophy. This significantly improved the team's results as it finished sixth in the class with 35 points and one class win from Silverstone.

After missing two seasons, the team was back for the 2016 season in a championship now known as the Blancpain GT Series Endurance Cup. Konôpka along with Lewandowski and Myszkowski (joined by Mikuláško as a fourth driver for Spa) competed in the Am Cup with the Lamborghini Huracán GT3. The team finished fourth in the class with 67 points and two podiums. ARC Bratislava most recently competed in the 2018 season where they only took part in the season opener at Monza as part of the Pro Am class, this time using the Mercedes-AMG GT3. The trio of Konôpka, Lewandowski and Kang Ling finished 34th overall.

=== Asian Le Mans Series ===
ARC Bratislava have been one of the mainstay teams of the series since the 2015–16 season. They last competed in the 2023–24 season as part of the LMP2 class. They did not return for the following season.

==== GT class (2015–2016) ====
ARC's intention to enter the Asian Le Mans Series was announced in September 2015. The team chose to compete in the GT class with the Audi R8 LMS Ultra despite concerns over the balance of performance. Konôpka's initial partner for the first round was announced to be Pierre Kaffer before Fairuz Fauzy could step in for the following round. Fauzy did not complete the season either however, as Afiq Yazid replaced him for the final round. The team finished seventh in the GT Teams Championship with 28 points. The team's best result was a fourth place from the opening round in Fuji.

==== LMP3 class (2016–2017; 2019; 2021) ====
In early 2016, the ARC bought a used Ginetta-Juno P3-15. After an unsuccessful registration for the 2016 European Le Mans Series, it was then decided that ARC Bratislava would use this car in the 2016–17 Asian Le Mans season instead as part of the LMP3 class. The team eventually entered two cars for the 2016–17 season. Konôpka, Darren Burke, Mike Simpson, Konstantīns Calko and Neale Muston were the five drivers to alternate between the two cars over the season. Car no. 4 enjoyed more success as it secured Ginetta's first Asian Le Mans Series podium in Fuji. In the next race at Buriram, the same car won its class. The car finished second overall in the LMP3 Teams Championship with these two podiums and 63 points. Car no. 7 finished fifth with 46 points and one second place from Buriram, where ARC Bratislava scored their first 1-2 finish. ARC Bratislava then made a one-off return to the LMP3 class with their Ginetta at the 2019 4 Hours of Sepang. Simpson and Muston finished fifteenth overall and ninth in the class.

After three seasons in LMP2, ARC Bratislava have moved back to LMP3 for the 2021 season. Their entry meant a competition debut for the Ginetta G61-LT-P3. This time around, Konôpka was joined by Tom Cloet and Ginetta's factory driver Charlie Robertson. After a complicated season with an unproven car, the team could only manage to finish ninth in the class with 14 points.

==== LMP2 class (2017–2020; 2022–2024; 2025–) ====
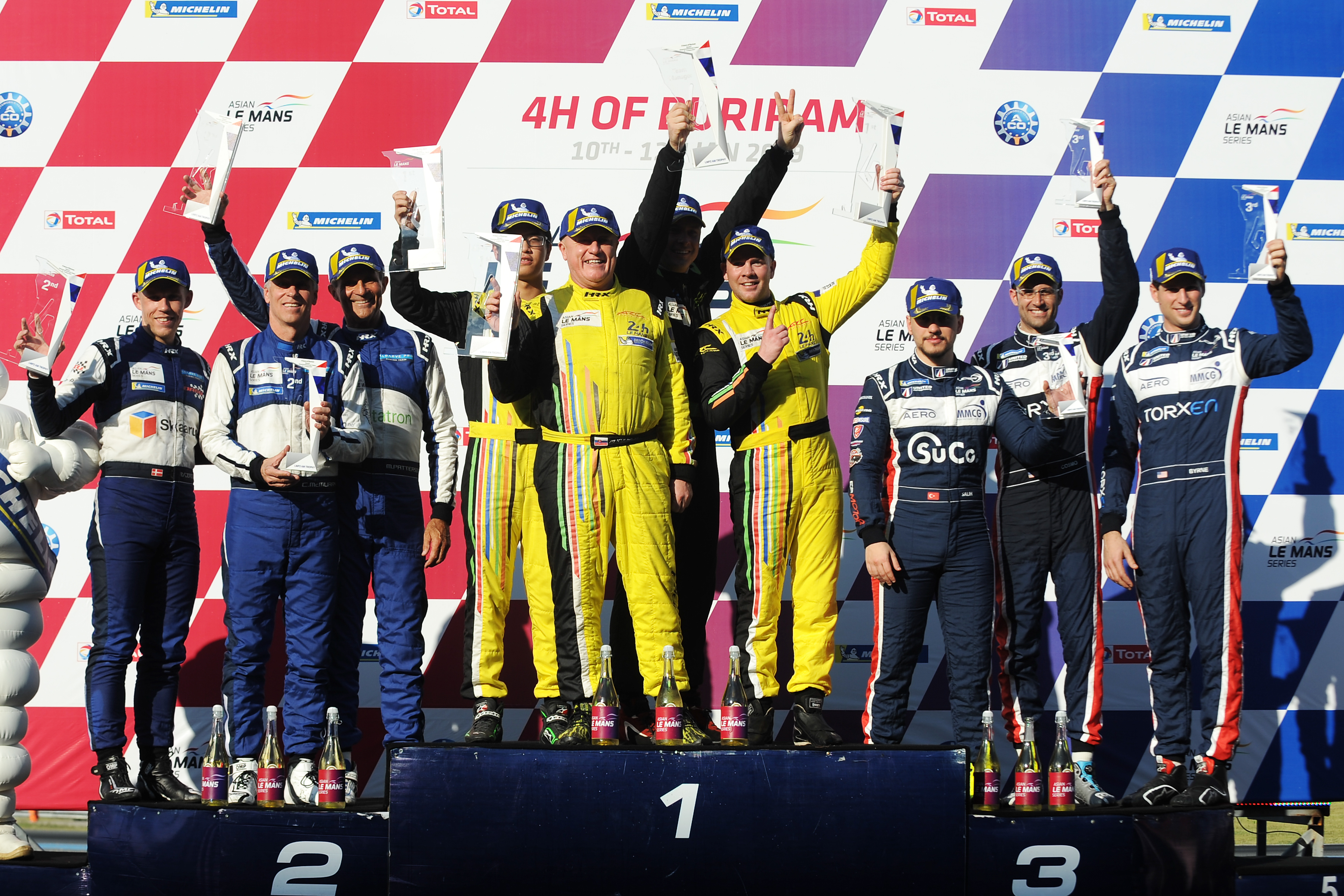
ARC Bratislava celebrating a class win at the 2019 4 Hours of Buriram.

For the 2017–18 season, the team has once again moved to a higher category, this time to LMP2 which is highest category in the series. Ligier JS P2 was chosen as the car to contest the season. Konôpka retained Calko and Breukers who drove for the team in the previous season. Breukers was however replaced by Gustavo Yacamán in the middle of the season. In their LMP2 debut, the team finished third in the LMP2 Teams Championship with 51 points and one podium. In the 2018–19 season, ARC Bratislava were one of three teams to compete in the new LMP2 Am subclass. Burke and Ling returned to the team to replace Calko and Yacamán. The ARC managed to win this class by getting three wins and one second-place finish in it. In the complete LMP2 class, they once again finished third after once again scoring 51 points. The following 2019–20 season was interrupted by the COVID-19 pandemic, which reduced the number of entries. Konôpka's team withdrew before the third round in Sepang.

After an underwhelming single season return to LMP3, ARC Bratislava decided to once again join LMP2 Am in 2022, this time with the Ligier JS P217 as the car remained unused after ARC moving to the Oreca 07 in the World Endurance Championship. Miro Konôpka would be joined by the returning Neale Muston and also John Corbett to create an all-bronze amateur lineup. After two seasons as a separate class, the LMP2 Am category however once again became a subclass for the overall LMP2 grid after only four teams registered for the full season. ARC Bratislava's best result of the season came in the final race in Abu Dhabi where they finished ahead of High Class Racing. The team scored 51 points in the overall LMP2 category (achieving this feat for the third time) and 63 points in LMP2 Am, finishing last in both championships, which still resulted in a third-place finish in LMP2 Am.

For 2023, the team would finally be able to enter their sole Oreca 07, which was previously used for the World Endurance Championship. With LMP2 Am no longer being a category, Miro Konôpka opted to bring two young professional drivers in Nico Pino and László Tóth, the latter of which would also be making his endurance racing debut. ARC Bratislava scored 18 points over the season and finished in last place in LMP2, which was ninth. Asian Le Mans Series would resume in December with the 2023–24 season. The returning Mathias Beche (who was driving for the team during the 2022 FIA World Endurance Championship) and Jonas Ried featured as Konôpka's new teammates. The team finished eleventh out of thirteen teams in the championship, scoring points in four rounds out of five.

On 11 September 2025, the entry list for the 2025–26 season was revealed, featuring ARC Bratislava in the LMP2 class with an Oreca 07. Miro Konôpka would be the only driver announced at this stage. The team announced its full lineup in late November, with Yann Ehrlacher and Matthieu Vaxivière both set to make their debut appearances with the team. The team had a mixed showing, finishing only three out of six races but also scoring points in all three. With two tenth-place and one ninth-place finish, they ended up fourteenth out of sixteen LMP2 entries. In the final race of the season, ARC Bratislava were looking to finish in a top ten position once more, but had to retire due to fuel miscalculation, leaving Vaxivière stranded in the final sector of the Abu Dhabi circuit and causing a virtual safety car procedure.

=== FIA World Endurance Championship ===
ARC Bratislava have contested the FIA World Endurance Championship exclusively in the LMP2 class with them becoming a full-time entry in 2021 in the LMP2 Pro-Am subclass. The team contested two full seasons and only missed one race due to issues with logictics. For 2023, ARC Bratislava opted not to return as LMP2 Pro-Am would be phased out due to the expanding Hypercar field.

==== 24 Hours of Le Mans entries ====
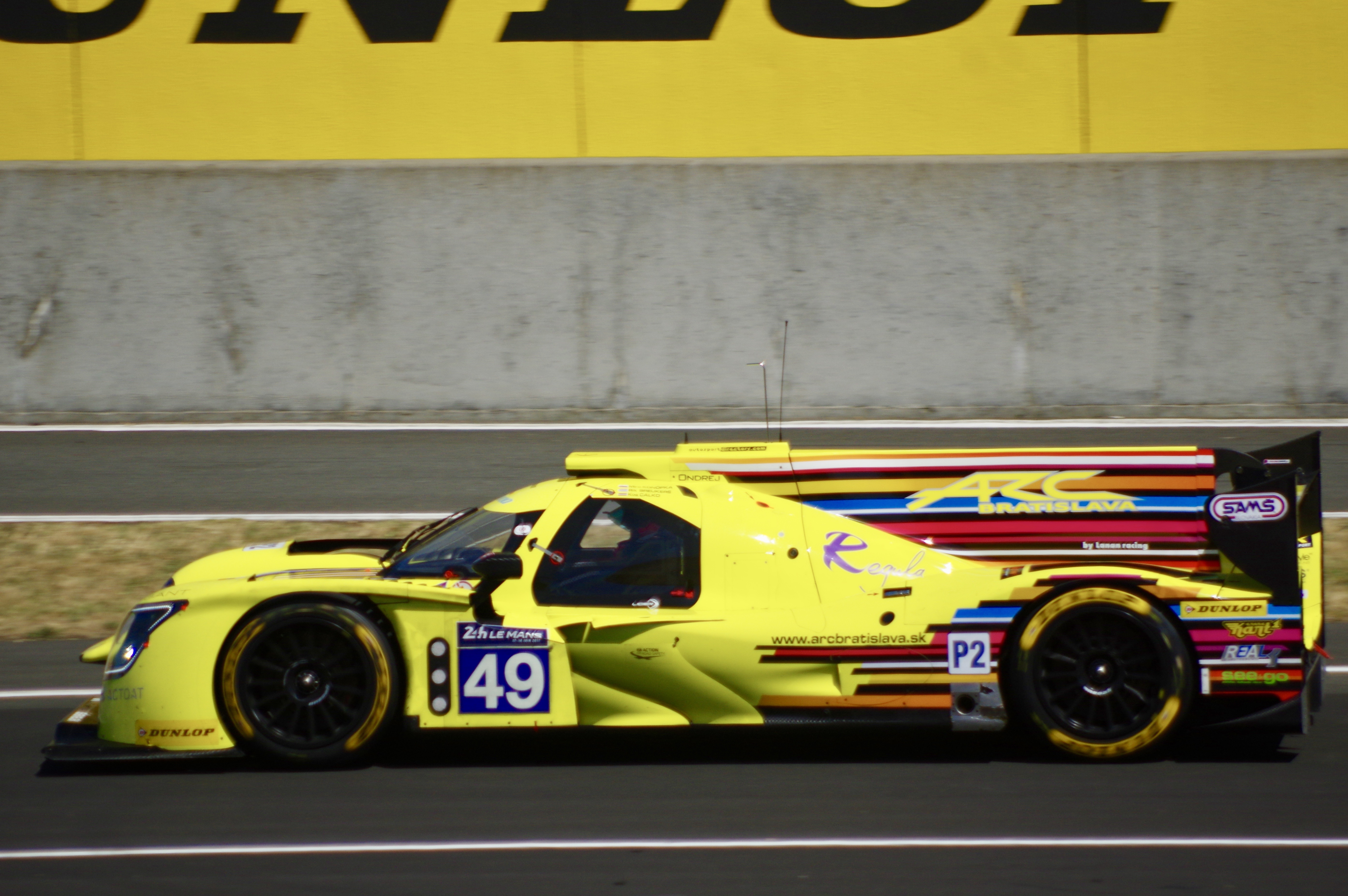
ARC Bratislava have made their 24 Hours of Le Mans debut in 2017. This Ligier JS P217 ended its WEC run at the 2021 6 Hours of Monza after which the team began using the Oreca 07.

ARC Bratislava first appeared on a provisional entry for the 2017 24 Hours of Le Mans in February 2017 and the team was listed with an Oreca 07. Konôpka however then claimed that ARC were planning to use the Ligier JS P217 instead. Calko and Rik Breukers were later announced as Konôpka's teammates. ARC Bratislava finished 45th overall in their debut after completing 314 laps. This was enough for 19th place in the LMP2 class. The team then secured an automatic entry for the 2019 edition of the race by winning the LMP2 Am trophy in the 2018–19 Asian Le Mans Series. For ARC's second Le Mans attempt, Konôpka surrounded himself with two Le Mans rookies in Henning Enqvist and Konstantin Tereshchenko. After multiple accidents, the team retired from the race after completing 160 laps.

==== 2021 season ====
Konôpka, a bronze-rated driver, secured a full-time entry for his team in WEC after a new LMP2 Pro-Am subclass was created, which mandates a bronze-rated driver in the teams' lineups and thus creating more opportunity for such drivers and teams in the series by giving them a separate championship in addition to being included in overall LMP2 standings. Despite its general uncompetitiveness, ARC Bratislava started the season with the Ligier JS P217 as the only team on the grid. Oliver Webb was signed to the team as its main driver, having experience in the series from LMP1. Webb could not attend the season opener in Spa however, which prompted Konôpka to use Darren Burke instead. The final seat was given to another British driver in Tom Jackson. The team did not manage to start in its debut race due to an oil leak. Webb then made his debut for the team in the 8 Hours of Portimão. The team managed to finish the race this time, however it was not without issues. A spin for Konôpka caused a safety car period at the start of the sixth hour. The car was then recovered and the team went on to finish 29th overall as the second to last car to be classified in the race and also the last LMP2.

Before the 6 Hours of Monza, it was announced that the team would switch to the Oreca 07 chassis for Le Mans and would finish the season with it. For Monza, there was another change in the driver lineup as Maťo Konôpka replaced Tom Jackson. In an uneventful race for the team, ARC Bratislava finished 14th, which was once again the last place for a classified LMP2 car. The subsequent debut for the Oreca at Le Mans was not without issues either as the car had to be pulled into the pits at one point due to an incident involving Miro Konôpka being spun. Further issues then involved Maťo Konôpka damaging the rear of the car after spinning during the night portion of the race under wet conditions. The team however managed to finish the race in a respectable 24th position overall and a 15th place in the expanded LMP2 class. Out of those within the championship, ARC Bratislava finished ninth overall (their best championship result to date) and fifth in Pro-Am. The performance of the Oreca proved to be an upgrade over the Ligier as Webb posted the third fastest time of the Pro-Am subclass in the race.

For the final two races in Bahrain, the team made further changes to its line-up. The third seat, which was occupied by Maťo Konôpka in the two previous races, was now given to Kush Maini for the six-hour race and Nelson Panciatici for the eight-hour race. The six-hour race saw ARC Bratislava finish fourth in Pro-Am, despite having technical issues due to which the only finished 21st overall. In a last-minute unscheduled change, Olli Caldwell replaced Webb for the final race of the season. The new squad could not match the class result from the previous race, finishing fifth in Pro-Am and eleventh in the complete LMP2 class this time around. ARC Bratislava scored the fewest total points in the LMP2 field. Miro Konôpka was also the only driver in the team to have contested all six races. Konôpka has expressed interest to continue in the series for the 2022 season.

==== 2022 season ====
ARC Bratislava's Oreca 07 sporting an updated livery at the 2022 24 Hours of Le Mans, where they were leading LMP2 Pro-Am before a radiator failure.

ARC Bratislava once again entered the LMP2 Pro-Am subclass for 2022, competing directly with only three other cars within the full LMP2 class that got expanded to fifteen entries. Before G-Drive Racing withdrew due to the ongoing Russo-Ukrainian War, only three teams were listed in Pro-Am. Algarve Pro Racing, who also provide technical support for ARC Bratislava and were set to do the same for G-Drive, instead joined the series under their own branding and moved to LMP2 Pro-Am. Mathias Beche and Tijmen van der Helm were listed alongside Miro Konôpka for the opening round in Sebring. Beche was however set to miss the 24 Hours of Le Mans as an ARC Bratislava driver as he is contracted to TDS Racing x Vaillante for the event.

ARC Bratislava have opened the season with a thirteenth place in LMP2 (fourth in Pro-Am), finishing sixteenth overall. For the 6 Hours of Spa-Francorchamps, Bent Viscaal joined the team after an early departure for Beche. Viscaal did not get to race however, as Konôpka crashed during his stint, forcing the team to retire from the race after completing 25 laps. Another driver change was scheduled for Le Mans, with Tristan Vautier being set to make his Le Mans debut after van der Helm also moving to the TDS Racing squad for the event. Maťo Konôpka also took part in the event and was available for test day as a fourth driver, but eventually did not take part in it as Vautier arrived in time from his previous racing commitments in IMSA. The team had a great start to the race, enjoying a lead in the Pro-Am category before being forced to replace a punctured radiator and losing multiple laps in the pits by doing so. Despite having no other issues, the team could only finish 26th overall, 21st in LMP2 and sixth in Pro-Am. This was therefore a worse result for ARC Bratislava compared to the previous edition of the race, despite completing 18 more laps. As part of the WEC, the team took 30 points for a third-place finish in Pro-Am, as they beat Ultimate who after numerous issues only finished 48th overall. The team is still yet to a score a point in the overall LMP2 category, which no longer awards points for just completing the race even outside the top 10.

On 24 June 2022, ARC Bratislava announced that they will not take part in the 6 Hours of Fuji due to very tight logistical deadlines after the 6 Hours of Monza. For Monza, both van der Helm and Beche are scheduled to return to the team and reform the original driver lineup. Beche almost led the team to its first pole, finishing second in overall LMP2 qualifying classification. The team however fell down to eleventh in LMP2, once again finishing last in Pro-Am. Despite Peugeot returning to WEC, thus increasing the grid in the top class, ARC Bratislava finished fourteenth overall in what was their best season result to date.

Ahead of the 8 Hours of Bahrain, Miro Konôpka stated that ARC Bratislava would not return to the series next year. Miro would be joined by Beche and Richard Bradley for the team's final appearance. The team could only finish 22nd overall behind the GTE Pro field due to extensive damage repairs. This meant thirteenth place in LMP2 and fourth place in Pro-Am. ARC Bratislava scored 78 points in Pro-Am over the season (and none in LMP2 overall), finishing last in both categories.

== Results ==
=== FIA GT Championship results ===
(key) (results in bold indicate pole position)

Year	Entrant	No.	Class	Car	Drivers	1	2	3	4	5	6	7	8	9	10	11	Points	Team Pos.
2005	(Slovakia) Autoracing Club Bratislava	57	GT2	Porsche 911 GT3 RSR	(Slovakia) Miro Konôpka (Slovakia) Andrej Studenič (Italy) Luigi Emiliani (Slovakia) Štefan Rosina	MNZ	MAG	SIL	IMO	BRN; 5	SPA	OSC	IST; 6	ZHU; 6	DUB; Ret	BHR; 7	12	8th
2006	(Slovakia) Autoracing Club Bratislava	77	GT2	Porsche 911 GT3 RS	(Slovakia) Miro Konôpka (Slovakia) Štefan Rosina (Belgium) Damien Coens (Belgium) Steve Van Bellingen	SIL; 10	BRN; 11	OSC; Ret	SPA; DNS	PRI; 9	DIJ; 7	MUG; 8	HUN; Ret	ADR	DUB; Ret		3	12th
2007	(Slovakia) Autoracing Club Bratislava	108	G2	Saleen S7R	(Slovakia) Miro Konôpka (Slovakia) Miro Horňák	ZHU	SIL	BUC	MNZ	OSC	SPA	ADR	BRN; **1**	NOG	ZOL		—N/a	
2008	(Slovakia) ARC Bratislava	111	G2	Saleen S7R	(Slovakia) Miro Konôpka (United Kingdom) Sean Edwards	SIL; **3**	MNZ; Ret	ADR	OSC	SPA	BUC	BRN	NOG	ZOL	SAN		—N/a	
2008	(Slovakia) ARC Bratislava	88	GT2	Porsche 997 GT3 Cup S	(Slovakia) Miro Konôpka (Australia) Karl Reindler	SIL	MNZ	ADR	OSC	SPA	BUC	BRN; 12	NOG	ZOL	SAN		0	–
2009	(Slovakia) ARC Bratislava	112	G2	Saleen S7R	(Slovakia) Miro Konôpka (Slovakia) Andrej Studenič	SIL	ADR	OSC	SPA	HUN; **1**	ALG	PRI	ZOL				—N/a	

=== Asian Le Mans Series results ===
(key) (results in bold indicate pole position)

Year	Entrant	No.	Class	Car	Drivers	1	2	3	4	5	6	Points	Team Pos.
2015–16	(Slovakia) ARC Bratislava	7	GT	Audi R8 LMS Ultra	(Slovakia) Miro Konôpka (Germany) Pierre Kaffer (Malaysia) Fairuz Fauzy (Malaysia) Afiq Yazid	FUJ; 4	SEP; 8	CHA; 6	SEP; 8			28	7th
2016–17	(Slovakia) ARC Bratislava	4	LMP3	Ginetta-Juno P3-15	(Slovakia) Miro Konôpka (United Kingdom) Darren Burke (United Kingdom) Mike Simpson (Latvia) Konstantīns Calko	ZHU; 4	FUJ; 2	CHA; 1	SEP; 6			63	2nd
2016–17	(Slovakia) ARC Bratislava	7	LMP3	Ginetta-Juno P3-15	(Australia) Neale Muston (Latvia) Konstantīns Calko (Slovakia) Miro Konôpka (United Kingdom) Mike Simpson	ZHU; 5	FUJ; 4	CHA; 2	SEP; 7			46	5th
2017–18	(Slovakia) ARC Bratislava	4	LMP2	Ligier JS P2	(Slovakia) Miro Konôpka (Latvia) Konstantīns Calko (Netherlands) Rik Breukers (Colombia) Gustavo Yacamán	ZHU; 3	FUJ; 4	CHA; 4	SEP; 4			51	3rd
2018–19	(Slovakia) ARC Bratislava	4	LMP2	Ligier JS P2	(Slovakia) Miro Konôpka (China) Kang Ling (United Kingdom) Darren Burke	SHA; 4	FUJ; 3	CHA; 4	SEP; 4			51	3rd
2018–19	(Slovakia) ARC Bratislava	4	LMP2 Am	Ligier JS P2	(Slovakia) Miro Konôpka (China) Kang Ling (United Kingdom) Darren Burke	SHA; 4	FUJ; 3	CHA; 4	SEP; 4			94	1st
2018–19	(Slovakia) ARC Bratislava	44	LMP3	Ginetta-Juno P3-15	(Australia) Neale Muston (United Kingdom) Mike Simpson	SHA	FUJ	CHA	SEP; 9			2	10th
2019–20	(Slovakia) ARC Bratislava	4	LMP2 Am	Ligier JS P2	(Slovakia) Miro Konôpka (Greece) Andreas Laskaratos (China) Kang Ling (Australia) Garnet Patterson	SHA; **Ret**	BEN; 3	SEP	CHA			16	4th
2021	(Slovakia) ARC Bratislava	44	LMP3	Ginetta G61-LT-P3	(Slovakia) Miro Konôpka (Belgium) Tom Cloet (United Kingdom) Charlie Robertson	DUB; Ret	DUB; 8	ABU; 6	ABU; 9			14	9th
2022	(Slovakia) ARC Bratislava	44	LMP2	Ligier JS P217	(Slovakia) Miro Konôpka (Australia) Neale Muston (Australia) John Corbett	DUB; 4	DUB; 4	ABU; 5	ABU; 4			51	4th
2022	(Slovakia) ARC Bratislava	44	LMP2 Am	Ligier JS P217	(Slovakia) Miro Konôpka (Australia) Neale Muston (Australia) John Corbett	DUB; 4	DUB; 4	ABU; 5	ABU; 4			63	3rd
2023	(Slovakia) ARC Bratislava	44	LMP2	Oreca 07	(Slovakia) Miro Konôpka (Chile) Nico Pino (Hungary) László Tóth	DUB; 7	DUB; 9	ABU; 8	ABU; 7			18	9th
2023–24	(Slovakia) ARC Bratislava	44	LMP2	Oreca 07	(Slovakia) Miro Konôpka (Switzerland) Mathias Beche (Germany) Jonas Ried	SEP; 10	SEP; 10	DUB; 10	ABU; 11	ABU; 8		7	11th
2025–26	(Slovakia) ARC Bratislava	44	LMP2	Oreca 07	(Slovakia) Miro Konôpka (France) Yann Ehrlacher (France) Matthieu Vaxivière	SEP; 10	SEP; 10	DUB; Ret	DUB; 9	ABU; Ret	ABU; Ret	4	14th

=== FIA World Endurance Championship results ===
(key) (results in bold indicate pole position)

Year	Entrant	No.	Class	Car	Drivers	1	2	3	4	5	6	Points	Team Pos.
2021	(Slovakia) ARC Bratislava	44	LMP2	Ligier JS P217; Oreca 07	(Slovakia) Miro Konôpka (United Kingdom) Tom Jackson (United Kingdom) Darren Burke (United Kingdom) Oliver Webb (Slovakia) Maťo Konôpka (India) Kush Maini (France) Nelson Panciatici (United Kingdom) Olli Caldwell	SPA; Ret	POR; 11	MNZ; 10	LMS; 9	BHR; 10	BHR; 11	8	11th
2021	(Slovakia) ARC Bratislava	44	LMP2 Pro-Am	Ligier JS P217; Oreca 07	(Slovakia) Miro Konôpka (United Kingdom) Tom Jackson (United Kingdom) Darren Burke (United Kingdom) Oliver Webb (Slovakia) Maťo Konôpka (India) Kush Maini (France) Nelson Panciatici (United Kingdom) Olli Caldwell	SPA; Ret	POR; 11	MNZ; 10	LMS; 9	BHR; 10	BHR; 11	72	5th
2022	(Slovakia) ARC Bratislava	44	LMP2	Oreca 07	(Slovakia) Miro Konôpka (Switzerland) Mathias Beche (Netherlands) Tijmen van der Helm (Netherlands) Bent Viscaal (France) Tristan Vautier (United Kingdom) Richard Bradley	SEB; 13	SPA; Ret	LMS; 12	MNZ; 11	FUJ	BHR; 13	0	15th
2022	(Slovakia) ARC Bratislava	44	LMP2 Pro-Am	Oreca 07	(Slovakia) Miro Konôpka (Switzerland) Mathias Beche (Netherlands) Tijmen van der Helm (Netherlands) Bent Viscaal (France) Tristan Vautier (United Kingdom) Richard Bradley	SEB; 13	SPA; Ret	LMS; 12	MNZ; 11	FUJ	BHR; 13	78	4th

==== 24 Hours of Le Mans results ====
Year	Entrant	No.	Car	Drivers	Class	Laps	Pos.	Class Pos.
2017	(Slovakia) ARC Bratislava	49	Ligier JS P217	(Slovakia) Miro Konôpka (Latvia) Konstantīns Calko (Netherlands) Rik Breukers	LMP2	314	45th	19th
2019	(Slovakia) ARC Bratislava	49	Ligier JS P217	(Slovakia) Miro Konôpka (Russia) Konstantin Tereshchenko (Sweden) Henning Enqvist	LMP2	160	DNF	DNF
2021	(Slovakia) ARC Bratislava	44	Oreca 07	(Slovakia) Miro Konôpka (United Kingdom) Oliver Webb (Slovakia) Maťo Konôpka	LMP2 (Pro-Am)	342	24th	6th
2022	(Slovakia) ARC Bratislava	44	Oreca 07	(Slovakia) Miro Konôpka (Netherlands) Bent Viscaal (France) Tristan Vautier	LMP2 (Pro-Am)	360	26th	6th

=== Le Mans Virtual Series results ===
(key) (results in bold indicate pole position)

Year	Entrant	No.	Class	Car	Drivers	1	2	3	4	5	Points	Team Pos.
2021–22	(Slovakia) ARC Bratislava	44	LMP2	Oreca 07	(Slovakia) Dávid Nemček (Slovakia) Maťo Homola (Slovakia) Dennis Zeťák (Slovakia) Jakub Štofko (Slovakia) Andrej Marečák	MNZ; 11	SPA; 17	NUR; NC	SEB; 20	LMS; Ret	1.5	20th
2022–23	(Slovakia) ARC Bratislava	44	LMP2	Oreca 07	(Slovakia) Andrej Marečák (Slovakia) Jakub Štofko (Slovakia) Erik Vizi (Slovakia) Maťo Homola (Czech Republic) Tomáš Enge	BHR; Ret	MNZ; 17	SPA; 21	SEB; 22	LMS; 17	2.5	23rd

=== Prototype Cup Germany results ===
(key) (results in bold indicate pole position)

Year	Entrant	No.	Class	Car	Drivers	1		2		3		4		5		6		Points	Team Pos.
Year	Entrant	No.	Class	Car	Drivers	R1	R2	R1	R2	R1	R2	R1	R2	R1	R2	R1	R2	Points	Team Pos.
2022	(Slovakia) ARC Bratislava	44	LMP3	Ligier JS P320	(Slovakia) Miro Konôpka (Slovakia) Maťo Konôpka	SPA		NUR		LAU		HOC						—N/a	
2022	(Slovakia) ARC Bratislava	44	LMP3	Ligier JS P320	(Slovakia) Miro Konôpka (Slovakia) Maťo Konôpka	SPA		NUR		LAU		WD	WD					—N/a	
2025	(Slovakia) ARC Bratislava	4	LMP3	Ligier JS P320	(Slovakia) Miro Konôpka	SPA		HOC		LAU		NOR		NUR		RBR		26	6th
2025	(Slovakia) ARC Bratislava	4	LMP3	Ligier JS P320	(Slovakia) Miro Konôpka	SPA		HOC		LAU		NOR		NUR		6	6	26	6th

=== ADAC GT Masters results ===
(key) (results in bold indicate pole position)

Year	Entrant	No.	Class	Car	Drivers	1		2		3		4		5		6		Points	Team Pos.
Year	Entrant	No.	Class	Car	Drivers	R1	R2	R1	R2	R1	R2	R1	R2	R1	R2	R1	R2	Points	Team Pos.
2025	(Slovakia) ARC Bratislava	44	Silver (Guest)	Lamborghini Huracán GT3 Evo	(Austria) Gerhard Tweraser (Slovakia) Adam Konôpka	LAU		ZAN		NUR		SAL		RBR		HOC		—N/a	
2025	(Slovakia) ARC Bratislava	44	Silver (Guest)	Lamborghini Huracán GT3 Evo	(Austria) Gerhard Tweraser (Slovakia) Adam Konôpka	LAU		ZAN		NUR		SAL		14	11	HOC		—N/a	

== Timeline ==
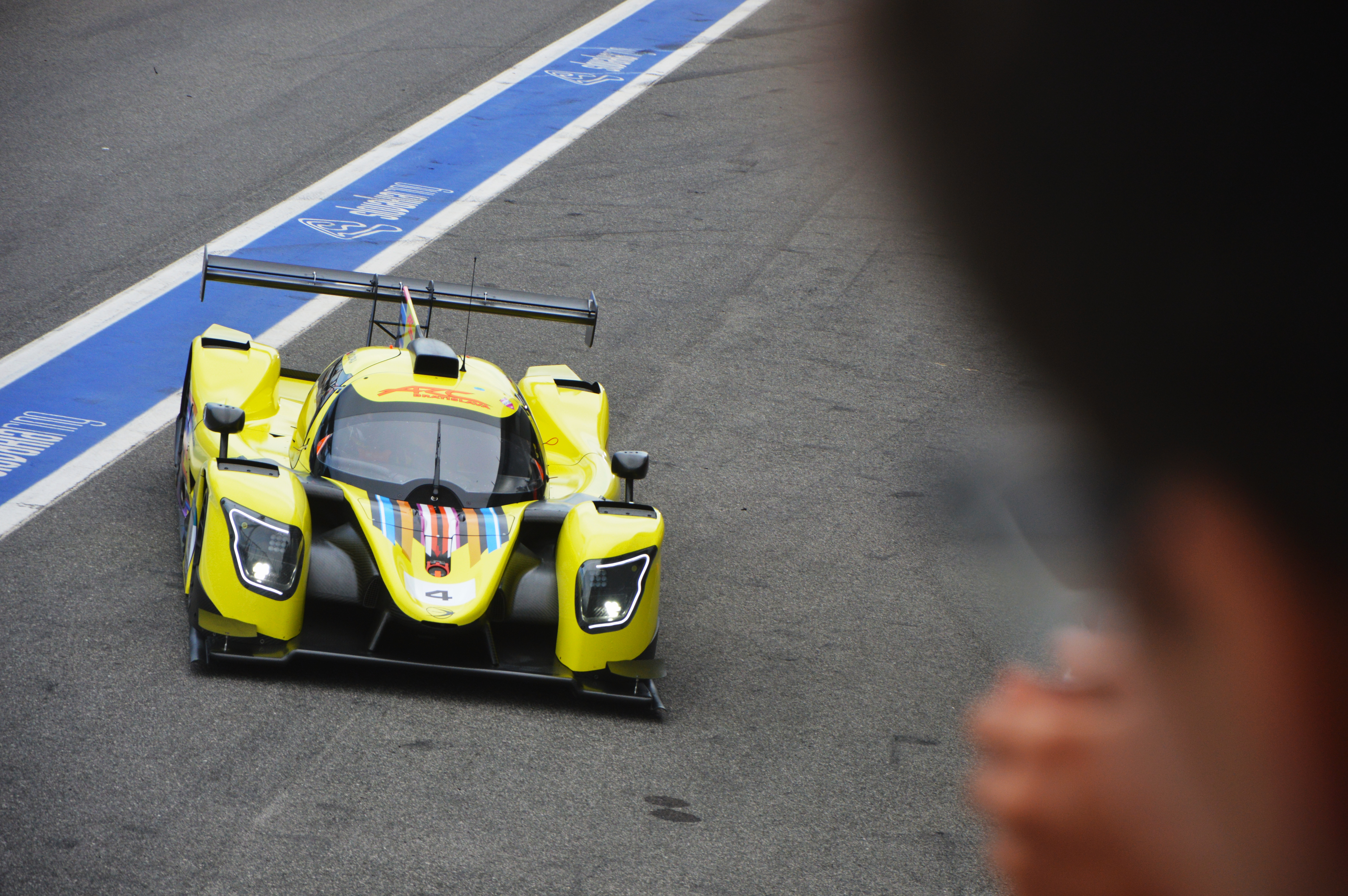
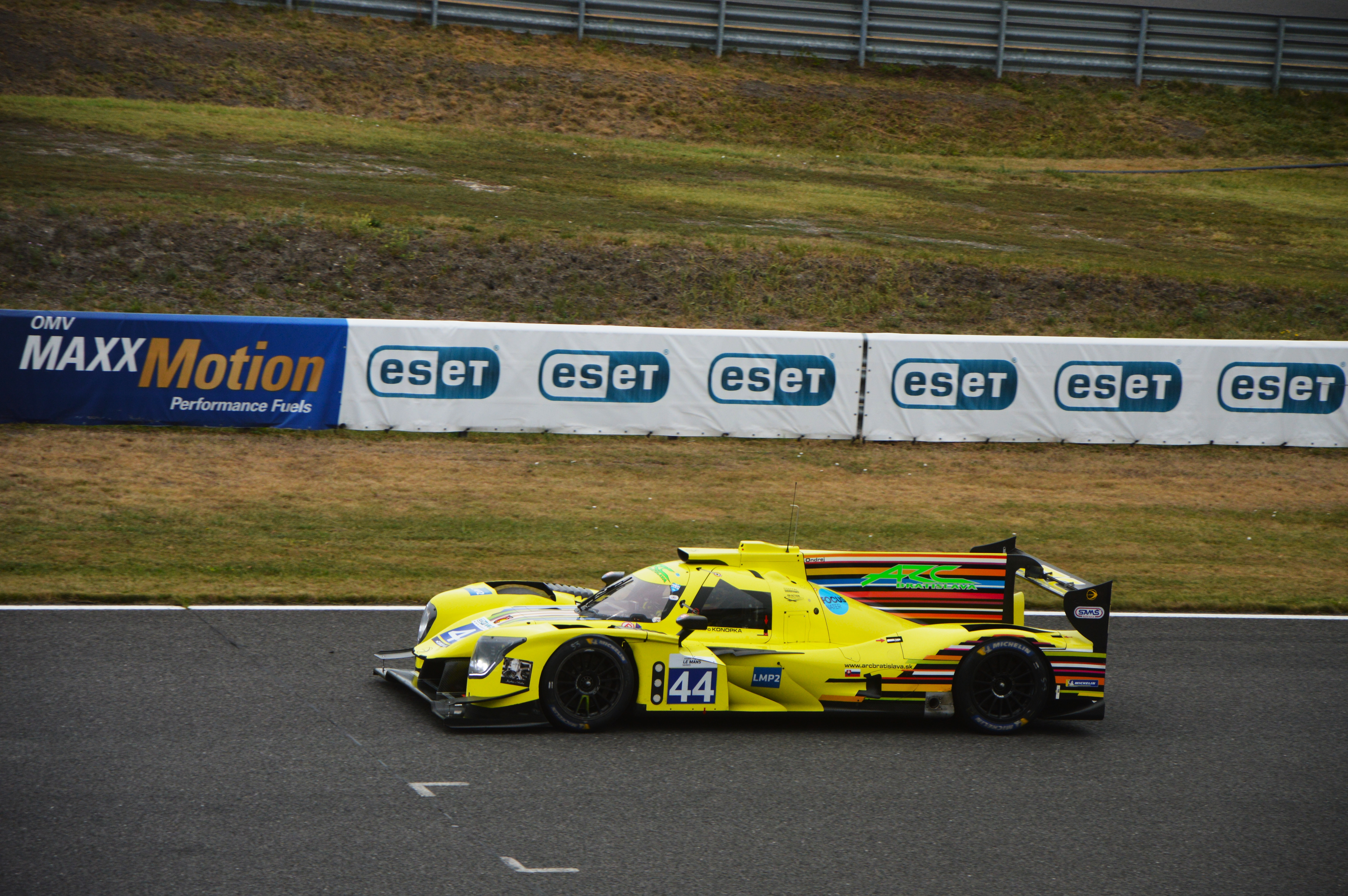
At the 2022 Grand Prix of Slovakia, Maťo Konôpka (top) debuted the Ligier JS P320, while Miro Konôpka (bottom) used the Ligier JS P217, still sporting leftover Asian Le Mans Series stickers.
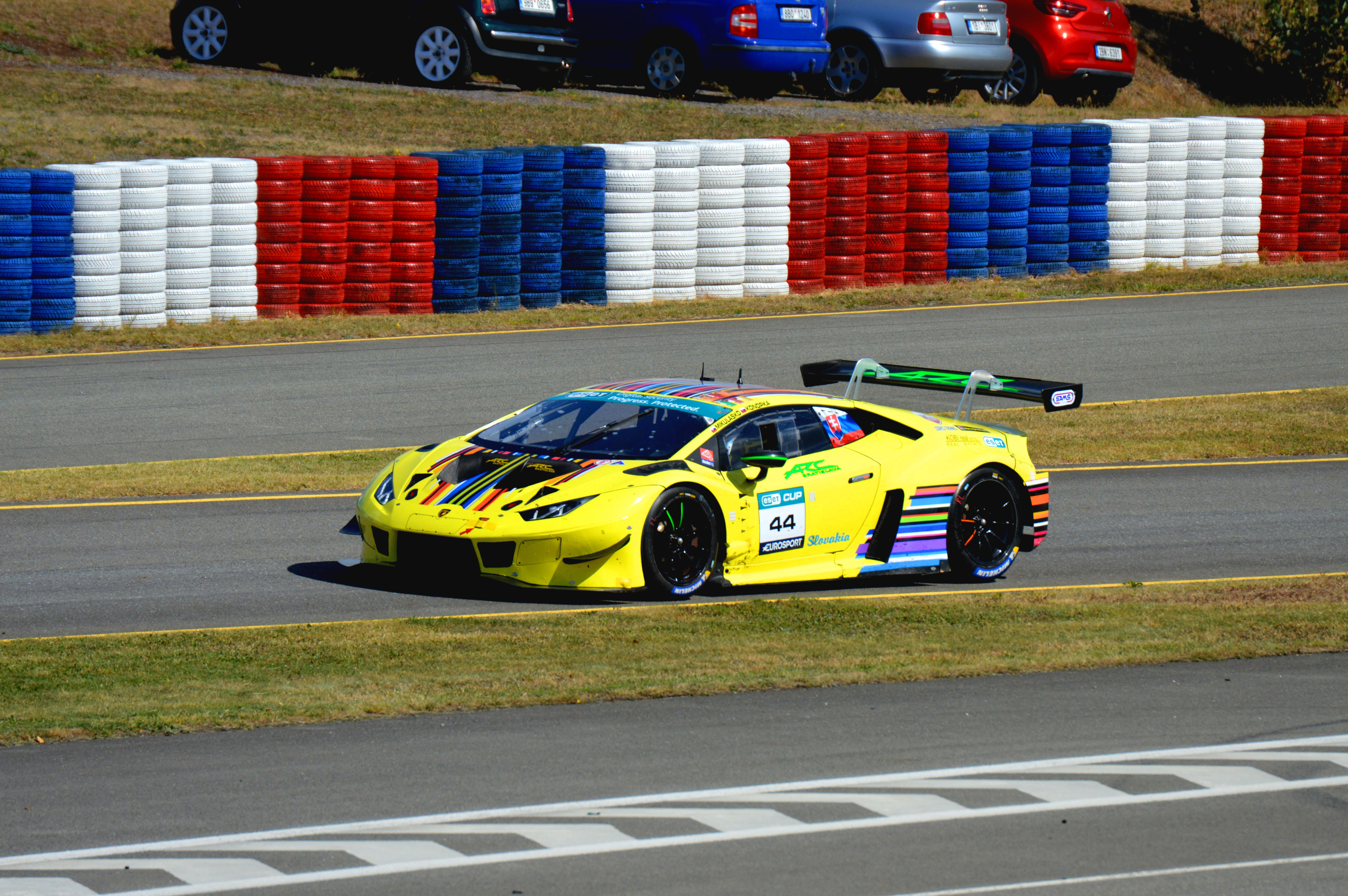
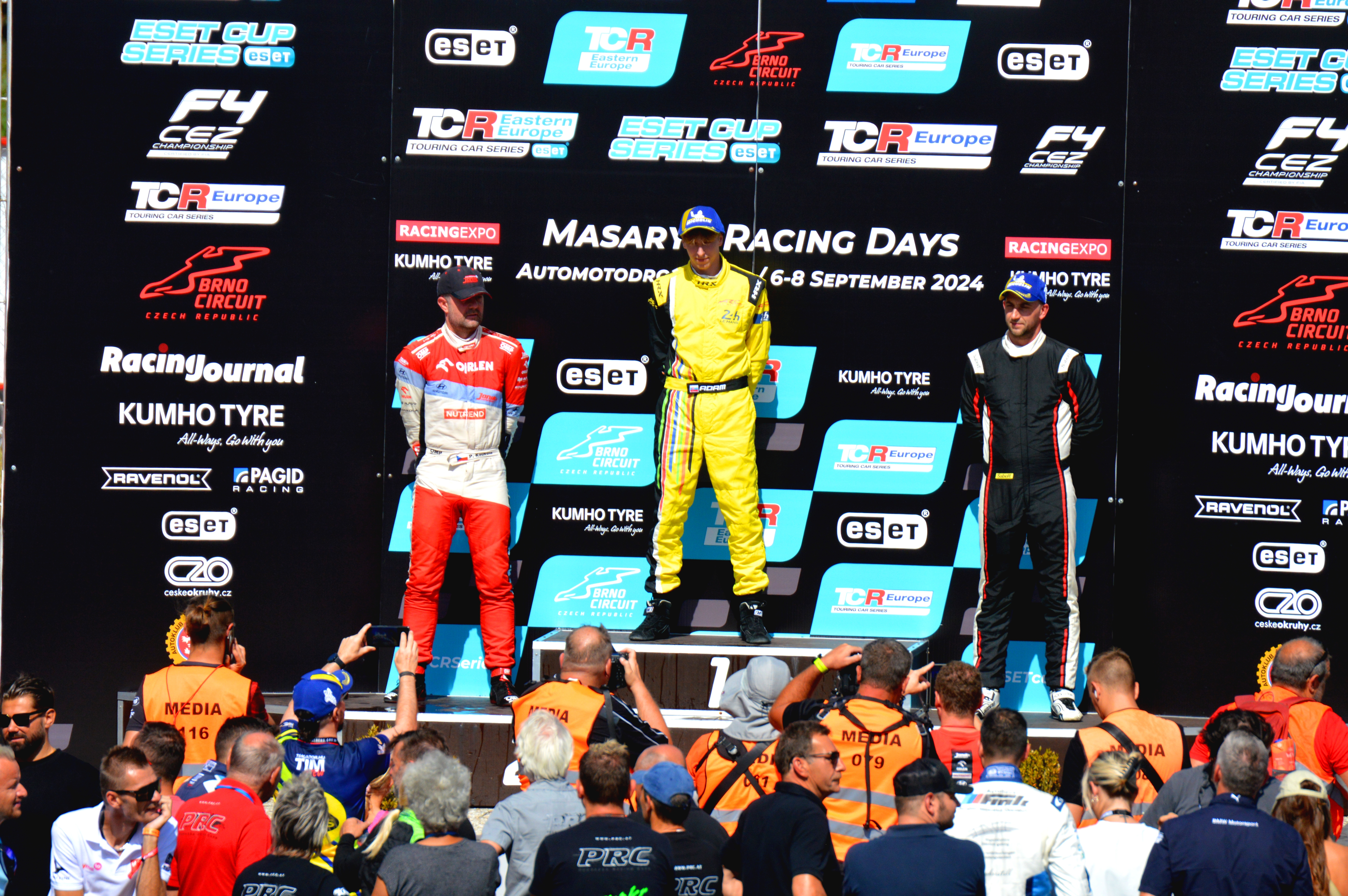
Adam Konôpka with a Lamborghini Huracán GT3 Evo at the 2024 Masaryk Racing Days which took place on the Brno Circuit. Konôpka won both sprint races as part of the GTX class.

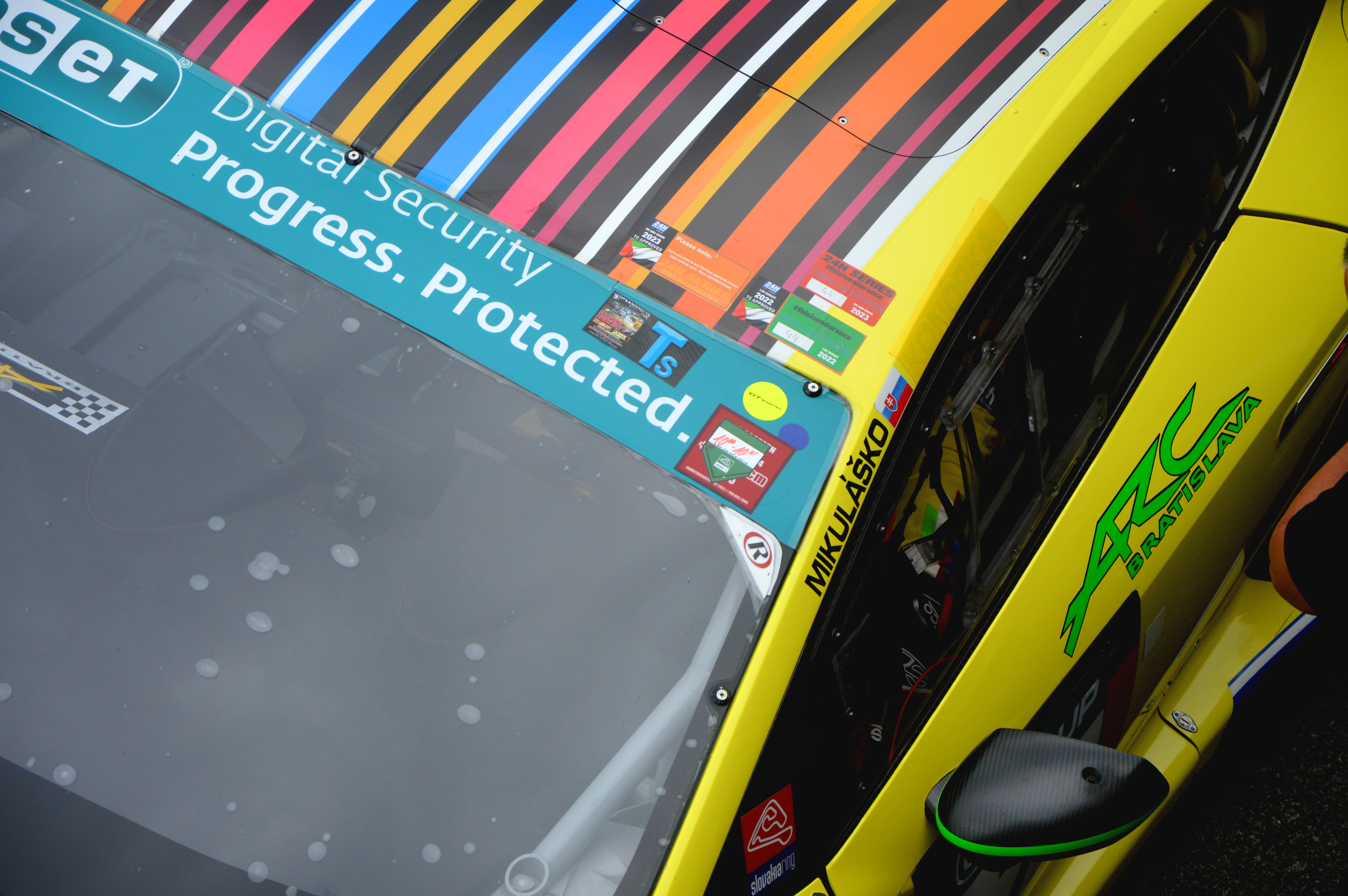
Several leftover approval stickers on Zdeno Mikuláško's Lamborghini Huracán GT3 Evo revealing some of the races the car took part in (pictured at the 2023 Grand Prix of Slovakia).

Current series
FIA CEZ Circuit Championship (Note: Starting with the 2013 season, most races have also been promoted under the ESET V4 Cup (2013–2021), ESET Cup Series (2022–2024) and GT Cup Series (2025–) names, respectively. Those represent a separate championship that usually consists of selected races from the FIA CEZ calendar that take part in or close to the V4 region.)	1998–
24H Series	2008, 2009, (Note: Dubai 24 Hour only.) 2010, 2012, (Note: Selected races only.) 2015, 2020, 2021, 2022–
Asian Le Mans Series	2015–2024, 2025–
Carbonia Cup	2024, 2026
Former series
Porsche Supercup (Note: The team was entered under the name Team Slovakia.)	2003
FIA GT Championship	2005–2009
American Le Mans Series (Note: 12 Hours of Sebring only.)	2007–2008
Le Mans Series	2009
Blancpain Endurance Series; Blancpain GT Series Endurance Cup	2012–2013; 2016, 2018
Lamborghini Super Trofeo Middle East	2017
Lamborghini Super Trofeo Europe	2017–2018
FIA World Endurance Championship	2017, (Note: 24 Hours of Le Mans only.) 2019, 2021–2022
International GT Open	2018, 2020
TCR Eastern Europe Trophy	2020–2021
Le Mans Virtual Series	2021–2023
Prototype Cup Germany	2022, 2025
Ultimate Cup Series	2024–2025
ADAC GT Masters	2025

By year
2003	Porsche Supercup
2005	FIA GT Championship
2006	Dubai 24 Hour, FIA GT Championship
2007	Dubai 24 Hour, 12 Hours of Sebring, Tokachi 24 Hours, FIA GT Championship
2008	24H Series, 12 Hours of Sebring, Merdeka Millennium Endurance Race, FIA GT Championship
2009	Dubai 24 Hour, Le Mans Series, Merdeka Millennium Endurance Race, FIA GT Championship
2010	24H Series
2011	Silverstone 24 Hours
2012	24H Series, Blancpain Endurance Series
2013	Blancpain Endurance Series, ESET V4 Cup, Merdeka Millennium Endurance Race
2014	ESET V4 Cup
2015	ESET V4 Cup, 24H Series, Asian Le Mans Series
2016	Blancpain GT Series Endurance Cup, ESET V4 Cup, Asian Le Mans Series
2017	Lamborghini Super Trofeo Middle East, Lamborghini Super Trofeo Europe, ESET V4 Cup, 24 Hours of Le Mans, Asian Le Mans Series
2018	International GT Open, Lamborghini Super Trofeo Europe, Blancpain GT Series Endurance Cup, ESET V4 Cup, Asian Le Mans Series
2019	ESET V4 Cup, 24 Hours of Le Mans, Asian Le Mans Series, Gulf 12 Hours
2020	Asian Le Mans Series, 24H Series, TCR Eastern Europe Trophy, ESET V4 Cup, International GT Open
2021	Dubai 24 Hour, Asian Le Mans Series, TCR Eastern Europe Trophy, ESET Cup Series, FIA World Endurance Championship, Le Mans Virtual Series
2022	24H Series, Asian Le Mans Series, FIA World Endurance Championship, ESET Cup Series, Prototype Cup Germany, Le Mans Virtual Series
2023	24H Series, Asian Le Mans Series, ESET Cup Series
2024	Asian Le Mans Series, 24H Series, ESET Cup Series, Carbonia Cup, Ultimate Cup Series, Gulf 12 Hours
2025	24H Series, Ultimate Cup Series, GT Cup Series, Prototype Cup Germany, ADAC GT Masters, Asian Le Mans Series
2026	24H Series Middle East, Asian Le Mans Series, 24H Series, GT Cup Series, Carbonia Cup
