= 2007 Dubai 24 Hour =

Motorsports endurance race

Seasons
- ← 2006 2008 →

The layout of the Dubai Autodrome.

The 2007 Dubai 24 Hour was an 24 hour automobile endurance race and the second running of the Dubai 24 Hour. The event was held on 11 to 13 January at the Dubai Autodrome, United Arab Emirates. The winning car was an A5 class BMW Z4 Coupe run by Duller Motorsport and shared between Jamie Campbell-Walter of the United Kingdom, Austrians Philipp Peter and Dieter Quester and Dirk Werner of Germany.

== Result ==
Pos	Class	No	Entrant	Drivers	Car	Laps
1	A5	40	(Austria) Duller Motorsport 1	(Austria) Dieter Quester (Austria) Philipp Peter (United Kingdom) Jamie Campbell-Walter (Germany) Dirk Werner	BMW Z4 Coupé	567
2	A6	20	(Austria) Konrad Lechner Motorsport	(Austria) Franz Konrad (Germany) Wolfgang Kaufmann (Slovakia) Štefan Rosina (Germany) Michael Schrey	Porsche GT3 RSR	564
3	A6	17	(Belgium) Pro Speed Competition 1	(Belgium) Rudi Penders (Belgium) Franz Lamot (Belgium) Alexandra van de Velde (Belgium) Stephan Schrauwen	Porsche GT3-RS	553
4	A6	5	(Lithuania) Oktanas	(Germany) Jürgen Alzen (Germany) Uwe Alzen (Lithuania) Nemunas Dagilis (Lithuania) Nerijus Dagilis (Lithuania) Egidijus Dapsas	Porsche 996 RSR	549
5	A6	3	(Slovakia) Autoracing Club Bratislava	(Slovakia) Miro Konôpka (United States) Jim Michaelian (Italy) Mauro Casadei (Slovakia) Jirko Malchárek	Porsche GT3	547
6	A6	15	(Belgium) G-Force Racing 1	(Belgium) Frank Hahn (Netherlands) David Hart (Belgium) Christian Lefort (Belgium) Yves Lambert	Porsche 997 GT3 Cup	541
7	A6	8	(Belgium) First Motorsport Team 2	(Netherlands) Gosse Stielstra (Netherlands) Edo de Vries (Netherlands) Menno Kuus (Netherlands) Olivier Tilemans	Porsche 996 Supercup	539
8	A6	4	(Germany) CM Creativ Marketing	(Germany) Martin Dechent (Germany) Jürgen Bender (Germany) Robert Wallenborn (Switzerland) Klaus Hackl	Porsche 996 GT3 Cup	539
9	A6	10	(Australia) VIP Petfoods	(Australia) Tony Quinn (Australia) Klark Quinn (New Zealand) Craig Baird (New Zealand) Kevin Bell	Porsche 996 GT3 Cup	536
10	A6	1	(Sweden) Hubert Bergh Motorsport 1	(Sweden) Hubert Bergh (Sweden) Manfred Gottschlich (Sweden) Lars Stugemo (Sweden) Markus Lonnroth	Porsche 996 GT3 Cup	527
11	A6	14	(France) Team Bermax-Massi	(France) Damien Kohler (France) Jean-Marc Merlin (United Kingdom) John Hugenholtz (France) Michel Mora	Porsche 996 Cup	524
12	SP1	102	(France) Solution F	(France) Eric Gasperini (France) Olivier Gomez (France) Giles Chatelain	Touring Cup Silhouette	521
13	A2	61	(Germany) Maeder-Motorsport GmbH	(Germany) Andreas Mäder (Switzerland) Harald Jacksties (Germany) Reinhold Renger (Germany) Reiner Schönauer (Germany) Jörg Viehbahn	Honda S2000	517
14	SP1	101	(Netherlands) Solution F - McGregor Team	(Netherlands) Raymond Coronel (Netherlands) Steven Gijsen (Netherlands) Jeroen Schothorst (Netherlands) Ben Kolff	Touring Cup Silhouette	516
15	A4	24	(Netherlands) Motors Television Team 1	(Netherlands) Peter van der Kolk (Netherlands) Nick de Bruijn (Netherlands) Nol Köhler (Netherlands) Hans Ambaum	BMW 325 Compact GTR	515
16	D1	87	(Austria) VW Motorsport Team 1	(Austria) Willi Rabl (Austria) Michael Kogler (Austria) Andreas Waldherr (Austria) Seppi Stigler (Hungary) Gergely Szabo	Volkswagen Golf V 2.0 TDI 16V	504
17	A5	35	(Sweden) Levin Racing	(Sweden) Anders Levin (Sweden) Martin Morin (Sweden) Daniel Haglöf	Porsche 996 GT3	503
18	A6	6	(Japan) Team Hayashi	(United Kingdom) Ian Ross Geekie (Sri Lanka) Dilantha Malagamuwa (Australia) Peter Boylan	Porsche GT3 Cup	499
19	A2	66	(Germany) Ebbing Motorsport 2	(United Arab Emirates) Karim Al Azhari (Netherlands) Henk Albronda (Australia) Martin Bailey (New Zealand) Cole Blair	Renault Clio 2.0 RS	498
20	D1	88	(Austria) VW Motorsport Team 2	(Austria) Willi Rabl (Austria) Erich Weber (Austria) Harald Reschinsky (Austria) Herbert Moritz (Austria) Michael Kogler	Volkswagen Golf V 2.0 TDI 16V	497
21	D1	57	(Netherlands) Marcos Racing Team 2	(Netherlands) Richard Verburg (United Kingdom) Michael Prophet (Netherlands) Fred van Putten (Netherlands) Harry van Zuylen (Netherlands) Cor Euser	BMW 120D	497
22	A6	22	(France) Dabo Competition	(France) Olivier Baharian (France) Jean-Marc Bussolini (France) Michel Ettouati (France) Joël Vicaire (France) Michel Didry	Porsche 996 Cup	496
23	D1	89	(Netherlands) Albers Racing Team	(Netherlands) Johan Albers (Netherlands) Marcel Nooren (Netherlands) Willy Welles (Netherlands) Kevin Veltman (Netherlands) David Broere	BMW 120D	496
24	A5	31	(Czech Republic) K&K Racing Team	(Czech Republic) Petr Kacirek (Czech Republic) Marcel Kusin (Czech Republic) Petr Valek (Czech Republic) Matěj Kotrba	BMW E36 M3 GTR	496
25	A3	53	(Germany) Team Black Falcon Team 3	(Germany) Alex Böhm (Germany) Daniel Zils (Germany) Matthias Unger (Republic of Ireland) Sean Paul Breslin (Germany) Roland Dietz	BMW 325i E90	493
26	A6	25	(Belgium) G-Force Racing 2	(Belgium) Philippe Greisch (Belgium) Christophe Kerkhove (Netherlands) Robert den Otter (Belgium) Christian Kelders	Porsche 997 GT3 Cup	490
27	A2	63	(Netherlands) Equipe Verschuur 1	(Netherlands) Frans Verschuur (Netherlands) Wilko Becker (Netherlands) Hoevert Vos (Netherlands) Frank Wilschut	Renault Clio RS	490
28	A6	19	(United Kingdom) Team RPM	(United Kingdom) Robert Simpson (United Kingdom) Nick Foster (United Kingdom) Peter Stanley (United Kingdom) Peter Bamford (United Kingdom) Alex Mortimer	Porsche 997 GT3 Cup	489
29	A2	64	(Netherlands) Equipe Verschuur 2	(Netherlands) Mike Verschuur (Netherlands) Bernard ten Brinke (Netherlands) Peter Bergervoet (Netherlands) Wim Beelen	Renault Clio RS	487
30	A5	58	(Austria) Duller Motorsport Team 2	(Austria) Klaus Engelhorn (Italy) Marco Frezza (United Kingdom) Oliver Morley (Austria) Vitus Eckert	BMW E46 M3 GTR	484
31	A2	60	(Belgium) ADS Racing Team	(Belgium) Thierry Brugma (Belgium) René Franchi (Belgium) Dominique Pestiaux (Belgium) Patrick Rosbach (Belgium) Fabrice Warroquiers	Renault Clio	484
32	A6	29	(Hungary) Bovi Motorsport Team 2	(Hungary) Kálmán Bódis (France) Marco Saviozzi (Hungary) István Rácz (Hungary) Ferenc Ratkai (Hungary) Zoltán Ács	Porsche 996 GT3 Cup	482
33	A5	42	(Spain) PROAUTO Team 2	(Spain) Juanjo Paz Blasco (Spain) Diego Puyo (Spain) Borja Veiga (Spain) Albert Roquet	Seat Leon Supercopa	482
34	A1	71	Mirage Australia 1	(Australia) Mal Rose (Australia) Peter Leemhuis (Australia) Tony Alford	Mitsubishi Mirage RS	482
35	A2	69	(Germany) Martin Tschornia	(Germany) Martin Tschornia (Denmark) Kurt Thiim (Croatia) Franjo Kovac (Germany) Andreas Kramer	Renault Clio	476
36	A6	16	(Belgium) VDS Racing Adventures	(Belgium) Raphaël van der Straten (Belgium) André Carlier (Belgium) Alain Fischer (Belgium) Christian Deridder	BMW M5 E34	474
37	A3	54	(Germany) BMS Racing/MSC Adenau	(Germany) Ulfried Baumert (Spain) Pedro Passyutu (Germany) Werner Cleef (Germany) Wolfgang Schmidt	BMW M3 E30	473
38	A3	52	(Germany) Team Black Falcon Team 2	(Norway) Stewart Stjernholm Lauersen (United Kingdom) Andrew Donaldsson (Germany) Frank Aust (Germany) Roland Dietz (Germany) Martin Zybon	BMW 325i E90	459
39	A5	41	(Spain) PROAUTO Team 1	(Spain) Toni Forné (Spain) Josep Rojas (Spain) Cristian Cano (Spain) Rafael Villanueva	Seat Leon Supercopa	458
40	D1	84	(Germany) Altenburger Destillerie	(Germany) Harald Schmitt (Germany) Hubert Nacken (Switzerland) Paul Hunsperger (Germany) Dietrich Hueck (Germany) Sebastian Tschornia	Alfa Romeo 147 JTD GTA Cup	457
41	A1	74	(Germany) Team Rhino's Leipert	(Germany) Marcel Leipert (Ukraine) Vitaliy Bilotserkivskyy (Germany) Stefanie Manns (Germany) Joe Schmidtler (Ukraine) Igor Skuz	Ford Fiesta	457
42	A1	73	Mirage Australia 3	(Australia) Ron Moller (Australia) Paul Stubber (Australia) Ray Stubber	Mitsubishi Mirage RS	456
43	SP1	28	(Hungary) Bovi Motorsport Team 1	(Hungary) Kálmán Bódis (Hungary) Attila Barta (Hungary) István Rácz (Hungary) Gábor Talmácsi	Brokernet Silver Sting	448
44	A2	65	(Netherlands) Traxon CLT	(Netherlands) Rob Duyn (Netherlands) Anton van de Watering (Netherlands) Leendert van Leeuwen	Renault Clio	445
45	D1	85	(Netherlands) Viscon Racing	(Netherlands) Cees Visser (Netherlands) Bert de Heus (Netherlands) Frank Nebig (Netherlands) Hendrik de Jong	Volkswagen Golf V 2.0 TDI 16V	440
46	A5	32	(Hungary) Zengő Motorsport	(Hungary) Zoltán Zengő (Hungary) László Csuti (Hungary) Tibor Nagy (Hungary) Balázs Sarrang	Seat Leon	430
47	A4	55	(Netherlands) Motors Television Team 2	(Netherlands) Peter van der Kolk (Netherlands) Nick de Bruijn (Netherlands) Co Visch (Netherlands) Bob Sijthoff (Netherlands) Jeroen van den Heuvel	BMW 325 Compact GTR	420
48	A4	38	(Germany) RACE BOX.COM	(Germany) Mirco Schultis (Germany) Martin Richter (Germany) Werner Habermehl (Germany) Marco Deutsch	Lotus Exige	419
49	D1	86	(Netherlands) Red Camel 2	(Netherlands) Ton Verkoelen (Netherlands) Henk Thijssen (Netherlands) Frank van Iersel (Netherlands) Jos Verkoelen	Seat Leon 1.9 TDI	409
50	A5	67	(United Arab Emirates) Motorsport Wheels LLC	(United Kingdom) Jonathan Simmonds (United Arab Emirates) Keith Wake (United Arab Emirates) Mohammad Alfalasi (United Kingdom) Phil Quaife	Volkswagen Golf GTI 2.0 Turbo	392
51	A6	9	(Lithuania) Toveros Sportas	(Lithuania) Darius Brazdžionis (Latvia) Alfredas Kudla (Russia) Emil Sildos (Latvia) Aivaras Pyragius (Russia) Ilya Burenko	Porsche 997 GT3	391
52	A1	72	Mirage Australia 2	(Australia) Kevin Burton (Australia) Richard Gartner (Australia) Adam Wallis	Mitsubishi Mirage RS	391
53	A4	56	(Germany) Matador Rennsport	(Netherlands) DMello Nieuwenhuis (Netherlands) Dennis Nieuwenhuis (Netherlands) Ronald Smulders (Netherlands) Niek Jansen (Germany) Jochen Krumbach	BMW M3 E36	381
54	D1	82	(Netherlands) Mad & Daring 2	(Netherlands) Laurens Meijer (Netherlands) Gerrit Meijer (Netherlands) Bob van der Sluis (Netherlands) Harmen van Putten	BMW 120D	343
55	A3	75	(United Kingdom) Barclays Mini Motorsport	(United Kingdom) Paul Harvey (United Kingdom) Paul Spooner (Saudi Arabia) Abdulaziz Al Faisal (Saudi Arabia) Khaled Bin Sultan Al Faisal	Mini Cooper S	337
56	A1	76	(Germany) Ebbing Motorsport 1	(Germany) Ernst Berg (Germany) Klaus Ebbing (Germany) Bernd Küpper	Ford Puma 1,6 RS	318
57	D1	81	(Netherlands) Mad & Daring 1	(Netherlands) Alex van't Hoff (Netherlands) Danny Werkman (Netherlands) Rick Abresch (Netherlands) Dolf Dekking (Netherlands) Francesco Pastorelli	BMW 120D	317
58	A6	7	(Belgium) First Motorsport Team 1	(Belgium) Dries Heyman (Belgium) Wim Jeuris (Belgium) Dirk van Rompuy (Belgium) Ronald Vetters	Porsche 996 Supercup	310
59	A4	51	(Germany) Team Black Falcon Team 1	(Denmark) Jan Kalmar (Australia) Jacob Smith (Denmark) Henrik Møller Sørensen (Denmark) Alex Christensen (Spain) Javier Escobar	BMW M3GT	304
60	D1	68	(Netherlands) Red Camel 1	(Netherlands) Ivo Breukers (Netherlands) Johan Jansen (Netherlands) Rinse Wassenaar (Netherlands) Harald Roelse	Seat Leon 2.0 TDI	264
61	A6	21	(Portugal) Sande E Castro Sport	(Portugal) Francisco Cruz Martins (Portugal) José Vaz Guedes (Portugal) José Dória de Freitas (Portugal) Antonio Gellweiler (Portugal) José João Magalhães	Porsche 911 GT3 Cup	238
62	A6	11	(Germany) SMS Seyffart Motorsport	(Germany) Gina Adenauer (Germany) Jan Seyffarth (Germany) Hannes Plesse (Germany) Christian Hohenadel (Germany) Philipp Wlazik	Porsche GT3	208
63	A5	33	(United Kingdom) EDM Motorsport	(United Kingdom) Peter Hardman (United Kingdom) Sam Hancock (United Kingdom) Jon Minshaw (United Kingdom) Philip Walker	BMW E46 M3 GT	187
64	A6	23	(Germany) KRS-Racing-Service	(Germany) André Krumbach (Germany) Florian Scholze (Germany) Uwe Rentel	Porsche 996 GT3 Cup	182
65	A6	30	(Austria) Renauer Motorsport	(Germany) Claus Schunk (Germany) Uwe Bleck (Switzerland) Maurizio Basso (Austria) Jörg Gerhard	Porsche GT3-RS	84
RET	A6	2	(Sweden) Hubert Bergh Motorsport 2	(Sweden) Magnus Öhman (Sweden) Djon Clausen (Sweden) Tomas Nyström (Sweden) Erik Floren (Sweden) Johan Stureson	Porsche 996 GT3 Cup	N/A
RET	A5	39	(Netherlands) Marcos Racing Team 1	(Italy) Ferdinando Geri (Netherlands) Frank Meijers (Italy) Giovanni Mezzasalma (Italy) Marco Cioci (Netherlands) Cor Euser	BMW M3 E46	N/A
RET	D1	90	(Netherlands) Jabe Racing	(Netherlands) Gert Huzink (Netherlands) Rob Filart (Netherlands) Rob Buursen (Netherlands) Ron van Eeuwen	Volkswagen Golf V 2.0 TDI 16V	N/A
RET	A2	62	(Netherlands) US Car World Racing	(Netherlands) Pieter Dubois (Netherlands) Rob Frijns (Netherlands) Jochen Habets (Netherlands) René Wijnen	Renault Clio Cup	N/A
DNS	A5	34	(Germany) Charlet Racing	(Germany) Alfred Wolfsgruber (Germany) Joachim Kiesch (Germany) Michael Tischner (Germany) Frank Kräling (Germany) Marco Schelp	BMW M3 CSL	0
