= Dubai 24 Hour =

Motorsports endurance race

(United Arab Emirates) Dubai 24 Hour

24H Series Middle East
- Venue: Dubai Autodrome
- First race: 2006
- First 24H Series race: 2015
- Last race: 2026
- Duration: 24 Hours
- Most wins (driver): (Netherlands) Jeroen Bleekemolen (3) (United Arab Emirates) Khaled Al Qubaisi (3) (Germany) Hubert Haupt (3)
- Most wins (team): (Germany) Black Falcon (5)
- Most wins (manufacturer): (Germany) Porsche (Germany) BMW (6)

The Dubai 24 Hour Race is both a sports car and touring car automobile endurance race held annually at the Dubai Autodrome in Dubai, UAE. It was inaugurated in 2006.

== Entrants and participants ==
Dubai Autodrome Track Map

As with all races in the 24H Series, promoted by Dutch promoter Creventic, they are open to both professional and semi-professional teams. There are both local competitors from the UAE and surrounding nations in the Persian Gulf as well as a host of international teams particularly from European nations.

Unlike the 24 Hours of Le Mans in France whereby teams are invited by the organizers to compete, the Dubai 24 Hour is solely made up of teams who have registered prior to the commencing of the actual race. Entrants must file in a registration application in order to have a chance at competing. Entry and registration fees also apply for competitors.

== Class structure ==
The race features both a variety of Grand tourer (GT), touring cars as well as specially built silhouette cars from a wide range of marques which are eligible to enter. These range from small-engined Super 2000 hatchbacks (such as the Renault Clio and Honda Civic) to racing-bred sport cars (such as the Porsche 911 GT3 & Marcos Mantis GT).

A method of performance-balancing by the organisers of the event is existent throughout many of the classes featured in the Endurance Race. An example of this can be witnessed in the A2 Class whereby Super 1600 cars race alongside Super 2000 and run on equal performance as the 1,600 cc cars are allowed to carry less weight. Other factors such as a larger fuel tank and also the tire manufacturer for specific classes or ensure even competition.

=== Classes ===
==== A1 ====
This is class restricted for subcompact cars. Cars with a maximum engine displacement of 1,300 cc can run on a minimum weight of 750 kg and an 80-litre fuel tank while cars with displacements up to 1,600 cc are run with a minimum weight of 820 kg and a 90-litre fuel tank. Cars that can feature in this class include the Honda Jazz, Toyota Echo, Nissan Tiida as well as other makes.

==== A2 ====
The A2 class features a host of Super 1600 and Super 2000 vehicles. These cars generally feature hatchback and small sedan vehicles. The engine displacement range in this class is between 1,600 cc and 2,000 cc and turbocharging for performance enhancement is not allowed. 1,600 cc to 1,800 cc vehicles can have a minimum weight of 900 kg while 1,800 cc to 2,000 cc cars are to have a minimum weight of 980 kg. Compact cars generally make up the field for the A2 Class with the most common makes being the Clio Renault Sport and the Honda Civic Type R.

==== A3T ====
This class is specifically for cars with engine displacement up to 2,500 cc their engine is enhanced by a turbocharger. In other words, only vehicles which are turbocharged are eligible to compete in the class. All cars in this class run on 100-litre fuel tanks regardless of engine displacement or car weight. In the 2009 version of the race, the class was mainly made up of Turbo-diesel or TDI compact cars such as the SEAT León Super Copa and the Volkswagen Golf R-Line.

==== A4 ====
The A4 Class is made-up entirely of mid-size cars with an engine displacement between 2,000 cc and 3,000 cc. Due to the wide nature of eligibility of this class, there are certain restrictions on larger engine vehicles. Cars between 2,000 cc and 2,500 cc can have a minimum weight of 1,000 kg while cars between 2,500 cc and 3,000 cc are to have a minimum weight of 1,100 kg. In the 2009, Dubai 24 Hour, the class featured three BMW 130i, a BMW Z4 Coupe and a Porsche 964 Carrera.

==== A5 ====
The A5 class pits genuine FIA-GT4 category cars against each. However, the cars in this class are to have a maximum displacement of 3,500 cc. Most of the vehicles in this class are sports car coupes with V8, 3.0L+ engines. All cars are required to weigh at least 1,200 kg and utilise a 120-litre fuel tank which are standard across the category. The 2009 24 Hour Race saw an entire field of a number of makes from the German manufacturer BMW ranging from Z4 Coupes to modified M3 GT-Rs.

==== A6 ====
This is the highest echelon of Petrol-driven vehicles in the race and is also the quickest category in the race. It features a host of FIA-approved GT3 Category cars from across the globe. The vehicles must have at least 3,500 cc of engine displacement and cannot exceed 4,000 cc. Due to the vehicles with 3,750 cc to 4,000 cc having an acceleration and top-speed edge than the makes below 3,750 cc, they must carry at least 1,300 kg of weight, thus being the heaviest of the entire race and can only have tanks capable of carrying 90 litres of fuel. Vehicles below this, can have a minimum weight limit of 1,150 kg and a 120-litre fuel tank.

==== 991 & 997 Class ====
Class 997 Porsche 997 Cup Cars* (models 2007..2013) Class 991 Porsche 991 Cup Cars* (models 2014..2017)

==== D1 ====
The first of the diesel powered-car classes, this class aims at drawing together an array of vehicles driven on diesel for the full duration of the race. D1 features vehicles with Engine displacements up to 2,000 cc, which is ideal for smaller-sized hatchback TDI vehicles. This is why the 2009 grid saw an array of European hatchbacks including the Volkswagen Scirocco R, SEAT León TDI and BMW 120d.

==== D2 ====
The D2 class caters for diesel-powered vehicles exceeding the limit of 2,000 cc in D1. Generally, mid-sized & full-sized cars occupy the grid. Turbocharging is permitted in this class but handicaps apply to higher displacement vehicles. For example, cars with 2,500 cc to 3,000 cc must meet the minimum limit of 1,200 kg while cars below that displacement have a minimum weight limit of 1,100 kg. A number of BMW 120d makes featured in the class in the 2009 race as well as a BMW 320d.

==== SP1 ====
The SP1 class is the first of the Special Cars class and houses silhouette petrol-driven racing cars which have a chassis modified from their production counterparts. SP1 sees a mix of uniquely designed vehicles built specifically for high-powered Touring car racing. The vehicles in this category often vary in great lengths in engine size, power and vehicle weight, therefore, vehicles who fit the Solution F category can have a minimum weight of just 950 kg and a 120-litre fuel tank. Other silhouette cars with engines up 3,200 cc of displacement can have a minimum weight of 975 kg and are restricted to a 100-litre fuel tank. Cars with 3,200 cc to 3,600 cc must have a weight of at least 1,050 kg and a fuel tank with a capacity of 100L.

==== SP2 GT3-A ====
This is a class reserved for FIA GT3 entrants whose vehicles surpass the 4,000 cc Engine displacement limit for the A6 cars and also for GT3 cars which have 6+ cylinders.

==== SP3 GT4-A ====
This is a class similar to the SP2 GT3-A category and it is reserved for SRO GT4-spec vehicles. There are performance balancing measures enforced by the racing organizers to balance out the field in the class. Depending on the Engine displacement of the vehicle an entrant will be assigned a minimum weight limit of either 750 kg or 1,200 kg and also a fuel tank capacity limit of either 120 litres or 100 litres.

==== SP4 ====
This is the newest class for the race and is solely for hybrid vehicle racing cars and electric-powered race cars. It will be running for the first time in 2010 edition of the Dubai 24 Hour. There are currently no performance balancing measures for the class.

== Race winners ==
Year	Drivers	Team	Car	Laps	Distance (Note: Distance is calculated by laps completed & measured in kilometres.)	Fastest lap	Remarks
2006	(Austria) Philipp Peter (Austria) Dieter Quester (Germany) Hans-Joachim Stuck (Austria) Toto Wolff	(Austria) Duller Motorsport	BMW M3 CSL	519	2797.41	2:10.057	
2007	(United Kingdom) Jamie Campbell-Walter (Austria) Philipp Peter (Austria) Dieter Quester (Germany) Dirk Werner	(Austria) Duller Motorsport	BMW Z4 Coupe	567	3056.13	2:04.435	Back-to-back wins in the first two editions.
2008	(New Zealand) Craig Baird (Australia) Klark Quinn (United Kingdom) Tony Quinn (Australia) Jonathon Webb	(Australia) VIP Pet Foods	Porsche 997 GT3-RSR	504	2716.56	2:03.334	
2009	(France) Gabriël Abergel (Lithuania) Andrzej Dzikevic (Germany) Niclas Kentenich (Germany) Carsten Tilke	(Germany) Land Motorsport	Porsche 997 GT3 Cup	573	3088.47	2:02.524	
2010	(Germany) Marco Holzer (France) Raymond Narac (France) Patrick Pilet	(France) IMSA Performance Matmut	Porsche 997 GT3-RSR	608	3277.12	2:03.348	
2011	(Brazil) Augusto Farfus (Germany) Claudia Hürtgen (United States) Tommy Milner (Sweden) Edward Sandström	(Germany) Need for Speed by Schubert Motorsport	BMW Z4 GT3	594	3201.66	2:04.858	
2012	(United Arab Emirates) Khaled Al Qubaisi (Netherlands) Jeroen Bleekemolen (United Kingdom) Sean Edwards (Germany) Thomas Jäger	(United Arab Emirates) Abu Dhabi by Black Falcon	Mercedes-Benz SLS AMG GT3	628	3384.92	2:01.921	New distance record.
2013	(United Arab Emirates) Khaled Al Qubaisi (Netherlands) Jeroen Bleekemolen (United Kingdom) Sean Edwards (Germany) Bernd Schneider	(United Arab Emirates) Abu Dhabi by Black Falcon	Mercedes-Benz SLS AMG GT3	600	3234.00	1:59.472	Second team to win back-to-back after Duller Motorsport.
2014	(Switzerland) Adrian Amstutz (Germany) Christian Engelhart (Switzerland) Mark Ineichen (Switzerland) Rolf Ineichen (Switzerland) Marcel Matter	(Switzerland) Stadler Motorsport	Porsche 997 GT3-R	603	3250.17	1:59.537	
2015	(Saudi Arabia) Abdulaziz Al Faisal (Netherlands) Yelmer Buurman (Germany) Hubert Haupt (United Kingdom) Oliver Webb	(Germany) Black Falcon 2	Mercedes-Benz SLS AMG GT3	604	3255.56	1:59.545	
2016	(France) Alain Ferté (United Kingdom) Stuart Leonard (United Kingdom) Michael Meadows (Belgium) Laurens Vanthoor	(Belgium) Belgian Audi Club Team WRT	Audi R8 LMS	588	3169.32	1:58.712	
2017	(Switzerland) Daniel Allemann (Germany) Ralf Bohn (New Zealand) Brendon Hartley (Germany) Alfred Renauer (Germany) Robert Renauer	(Germany) Herberth Motorsport	Porsche 991 GT3 R	578	3115.42	1:59.198	
2018	(Saudi Arabia) Abdulaziz Al Faisal (Netherlands) Yelmer Buurman (Germany) Hubert Haupt (Italy) Gabriele Piana	(Germany) Black Falcon	Mercedes-AMG GT3	606	3266.34	1:59.394	
2019	(Netherlands) Rik Breukers (Germany) Christopher Haase (Germany) Dimitri Parhofer (Belgium) Frédéric Vervisch	(Germany) Car Collection Motorsport	Audi R8 LMS Evo	607	3271.73	1:58.695	
2020	(United Arab Emirates) Khaled Al Qubaisi (United Kingdom) Ben Barker (Netherlands) Jeroen Bleekemolen (Germany) Hubert Haupt (Germany) Manuel Metzger	(Germany) Black Falcon	Mercedes-AMG GT3	168	905.52 (Note: Race stopped at 7:18 of the race, and called after 16 hours (including 8:48 of red flag time) because of heavy rain which flooded the track.)	1:59.430	Shortest distance record.
2021	(France) Julien Andlauer (United Arab Emirates) Frédéric Fatien (France) Alain Ferté (France) Mathieu Jaminet (Zimbabwe) Axcil Jefferies	(United Arab Emirates) GPX Racing	Porsche 911 GT3 R	600	3234.00	1:58.606	First ever win for a local team.
2022	(Saudi Arabia) Mohammed Bin Saud Al Saud (Zimbabwe) Axcil Jefferies (Germany) Christopher Mies (France) Thomas Neubauer (Belgium) Dries Vanthoor	(Saudi Arabia) MS7 by WRT	Audi R8 LMS Evo	596	3212.44	1:59.110	
2023	(Saudi Arabia) Mohammed Bin Saud Al Saud (Germany) Jens Klingmann (Mexico) Diego Menchaca (France) Jean-Baptiste Simmenauer (Belgium) Dries Vanthoor	(Saudi Arabia) MS7 by WRT	BMW M4 GT3	621	3347.19	1:59.444	Third team to win back-to-back. First team to win with two different manufactures.
2024	(Germany) Christopher Haase (Belgium) Gilles Magnus (Austria) Simon Reicher (Germany) Markus Winkelhock (China) Mike Zhou Bihuang	(Austria) Eastalent Racing Team	Audi R8 LMS Evo II	603	3250.17	1:59.666	First win for an Austrian team since Duller Motorsport in 2007.
2025	(Oman) Al Faisal Al Zubair (United Kingdom) Dan Harper (Germany) Max Hesse (United Kingdom) Darren Leung (United Kingdom) Ben Tuck	(Oman) AlManar Racing by Team WRT	BMW M4 GT3 Evo	589	3174.71	1:58.053	Fourth win for Team WRT. Debut win for the new Evo-spec BMW M4 GT3.
2026	(South Africa) Kelvin van der Linde (United States) Anthony McIntosh (South Africa) Jordan Pepper (Spain) Fran Rueda (United Kingdom) Ben Tuck	(Belgium) Team WRT	BMW M4 GT3 Evo	604	3255.56	1:58.130	Fifth win for Team WRT.

== Drivers' title wins ==
Wins	Driver	Years
3	(Netherlands) Jeroen Bleekemolen	2012, 2013, 2020
3	(United Arab Emirates) Khaled Al Qubaisi	2012, 2013, 2020
3	(Germany) Hubert Haupt	2015, 2018, 2020
2	(Austria) Philipp Peter	2006, 2007
2	(Austria) Dieter Quester	2006, 2007
2	(United Kingdom) Sean Edwards	2012, 2013
2	(Saudi Arabia) Abdulaziz Al Faisal	2015, 2018
2	(Netherlands) Yelmer Buurman	2015, 2018
2	(France) Alain Ferté	2016, 2021
2	(Germany) Christopher Haase	2019, 2024
2	(Zimbabwe) Axcil Jefferies	2021, 2022
2	(Saudi Arabia) Mohammed Bin Saud Al Saud	2022, 2023
2	(Belgium) Dries Vanthoor	2022, 2023
2	(United Kingdom) Ben Tuck	2025, 2026

== Manufacturer title wins ==
Wins	Manufacturer	Year(s)	Team	Year(s)
6	(Germany) Porsche	2008, 2009, 2010, 2014, 2017, 2021	(Australia) VIP Pet Foods	2008
6	(Germany) Porsche	2008, 2009, 2010, 2014, 2017, 2021	(Germany) Land Motorsport	2009
6	(Germany) Porsche	2008, 2009, 2010, 2014, 2017, 2021	(France) IMSA Performance Matmut	2010
6	(Germany) Porsche	2008, 2009, 2010, 2014, 2017, 2021	(Switzerland) Stadler Motorsport	2014
6	(Germany) Porsche	2008, 2009, 2010, 2014, 2017, 2021	(Germany) Herberth Motorsport	2017
6	(Germany) Porsche	2008, 2009, 2010, 2014, 2017, 2021	(United Arab Emirates) GPX Racing	2021
6	(Germany) BMW	2006, 2007, 2011, 2023, 2025, 2026	(Austria) Duller Motorsport	2006, 2007
6	(Germany) BMW	2006, 2007, 2011, 2023, 2025, 2026	(Germany) Need for Speed by Schubert Motorsport	2011
6	(Germany) BMW	2006, 2007, 2011, 2023, 2025, 2026	(Saudi Arabia) MS7 by WRT	2023
6	(Germany) BMW	2006, 2007, 2011, 2023, 2025, 2026	(Oman) AlManar Racing by Team WRT	2025
6	(Germany) BMW	2006, 2007, 2011, 2023, 2025, 2026	(Belgium) Team WRT	2026
5	(Germany) Mercedes-Benz	2012, 2013, 2015, 2018, 2020	(United Arab Emirates) Abu Dhabi by Black Falcon	2012, 2013
5	(Germany) Mercedes-Benz	2012, 2013, 2015, 2018, 2020	(Germany) Black Falcon	2015, 2018, 2020
4	(Germany) Audi	2016, 2019, 2022, 2024	(Belgium) Belgian Audi Club Team WRT	2016
4	(Germany) Audi	2016, 2019, 2022, 2024	(Germany) Car Collection Motorsport	2019
4	(Germany) Audi	2016, 2019, 2022, 2024	(Saudi Arabia) MS7 by WRT	2022
4	(Germany) Audi	2016, 2019, 2022, 2024	(Austria) Eastalent Racing Team	2024

== See also ==
- 24H Series
