= 2006 Dubai 24 Hour =

Motorsports endurance race

Seasons
- ← 2005 2007 →

The layout of the Dubai Autodrome.

The 2006 Dubai 24 Hours was the first running of the event and the first event of what would later become the 24H Series. It was held at the Dubai Autodrome from 11–13 January 2006. The winning car was an A5 class BMW 320i E46 run by Duller Motorsport and shared between Dieter Quester, Hans-Joachim Stuck, Philipp Peter and Toto Wolff.

== Result ==
Pos	Class	No	Entrant	Drivers	Car	Laps
1	A5	31	(Austria) Duller Motorsport 1	(Austria) Dieter Quester (Germany) Hans-Joachim Stuck (Austria) Philipp Peter (Austria) Toto Wolff	BMW M3 E46 GTR	519
2	A6	12	(Sweden) Hubert Bergh Motorsport	(Sweden) Hubert Bergh (Sweden) Sven Isaksson (Sweden) Manfred Gottschich (Sweden) Kenneth Hedberg (Sweden) Djon Clausen	Porsche 996 GT3	509
3	A6	1	(Slovakia) AC Bratislava	(Slovakia) Miro Konôpka (United States) Gene Sigal (United States) Matthew Alhadeff (Slovakia) Jirko Malchárek	Porsche GT3	506
4	A6	4	(Germany) CM Creativ Marketing	(Germany) Martin Dechent (Germany) Jürgen Bender (Denmark) Lars Erik Nielsen	Porsche 996 GT3 Cup	500
5	A2	53	(Germany) Maeder Motorsport GmbH	(Germany) Andreas Mäder (Switzerland) Harald Jacksties (Germany) Nils Bartels (Germany) Ralf Schmidt (Germany) Reinhold Renger	Honda S2000	487
6	A4	55	(Netherlands) Motors Television	(Netherlands) Cor Euser (Netherlands) Peter van der Kolk (Netherlands) Johannes Ambaum (Netherlands) Arnoldus Kohler (Netherlands) Nick de Bruijn	BMW Compact GTR	486
7	A2	60	(Germany) Schubert Motors 1	(Bahrain) Shaikh Jaber bin Ali Al Khalifa (Germany) Uwe Nittel (Germany) Horst von Saurma (Germany) Jochen Übler	BMW E46 320i S2000	483
8	A6	10	(Germany) Maddox Racing	(Germany) Rainer Hartmann (Germany) Jürgen Bode (Germany) Dietmar Haggenmüller (Germany) Dominik Neumeyer	Porsche 996 GT3 Cup	482
9	D1	97	(Germany) Schubert Motors 3	(Germany) Claudia Hürtgen (Austria) Johannes Stuck (Germany) Bernhard Laber (Germany) Roland Hertner (United Kingdom) Paul Spooner	BMW 120D	480
10	A4	45	(Germany) Team German Wheels.com	(Germany) Alex Böhm (United Kingdom) Dean Hawkey (Germany) Michael Luther (Germany) Nicki Wegeler	BMW M3	477
11	A6	26	(Netherlands) Lammertink	(Italy) Luca Moro (Germany) Wolfgang Kaufmann (Netherlands) Ardi van der Hoek	Porsche GT3	471
12	A6	2	(Germany) Eigner Oktanas	(Lithuania) Egidijus Dapsas (Lithuania) Nemunas Dagilis (Lithuania) Nerijus Dagilis (Lithuania) Titas Sereika (Lithuania) Alfredas Kudla	Porsche 996 GT3	469
13	D1	96	(Italy) Maxicars	(Italy) Giuseppe Arlotti (Italy) Simone Stanguellini (Italy) Bruno Barbaro (Italy) Pierre Enrico Tonetti	Seat Leon 1.9 TDI	469
14	A1	73	(Australia) Team Mirage Australian 1	(Australia) Mal Rose (Australia) Kevin Burton (Australia) Anthony Robson	Mitsubishi Mirage RS	463
15	A1	74	(Australia) Team Mirage Australian 2	(Australia) Mal Rose (Australia) Richard Gartner (Australia) Colin Osborne (Australia) Dane Rudolph	Mitsubishi Mirage RS	462
16	D1	87	(Netherlands) Match Racing Cupra	(Netherlands) John Langeveld (Netherlands) John Jansen (Netherlands) Ronald Morien	Seat Leon 1.9 TDI Cupra	458
17	A5	24	(Germany) Charlet Racing Monaco	(Germany) Alfred Wolfsgruber (Germany) Joachim Kiesch (Switzerland) Michael Müller (Germany) Gernot Maxx	BMW M3 E46	458
18	A2	59	H&R / VW Team Austria	(Austria) Andreas Waldher (Austria) Hannes Danzinger (Austria) Martin Jakubowics (Austria) Jochen Bauer	Volkswagen Golf IV	453
19	D1	86	(Netherlands) Auto Traa-Flexipool Racing	(Netherlands) Ivo Breukers (Netherlands) Phillipe Ribbens (Netherlands) Robert de Graaff (Netherlands) Ron Eeuwen	Seat Leon 1.9 TDI Cupra	452
20	A6	11	(Belgium) First Motorsport	(Belgium) Bert van Rossem (Belgium) Pascal Nelissen-Grade (Belgium) Kelly Jamers (Belgium) Dirk Van Rompuy	Porsche 996 Supercup	451
21	A6	8	(Belgium) Speed Lover	(Belgium) Jean-Pierre Verhoeven (Belgium) Robert Mathot (Netherlands) Arjan van der Zwaan	Porsche 996 GT3	448
22	A5	29	(Netherlands) Marcos Racing International	(Netherlands) Cor Euser (Netherlands) Peter van der Kolk (Netherlands) Frank Meijers (Spain) José Luis Bermúdez de Castro (Netherlands) Ron Tieman	BMW M3 E46	444
23	D1	94	(Germany) H&R Spezialfedern	(Germany) Kai Jordan (Germany) Thomas Schiemann (Germany) Ralph Bohnhorst	Volkswagen Touran 2.0 TDI	444
24	A2	65	(Netherlands) Orbit Autosport 2	(Netherlands) Wilko Becker (Netherlands) Frank Wilschut (Netherlands) Martin van den Brink (Netherlands) Hoevert Vos (Netherlands) Paul Vahstal	Renault Clio	442
25	D1	91	(Netherlands) Orbit Autosport 1	(Netherlands) Sheila Verschuur (Netherlands) Mike Verschuur (Netherlands) Tim Buijs (Netherlands) Yelmer Buurman	Seat Ibiza 1.9 TDI Cupra	439
26	A2	54	(Netherlands) Champs 24H 2004	(Netherlands) Co Visch (Netherlands) Theo de Prenter (Netherlands) Sjaco Griffioen (Netherlands) Hank Melse	BMW 318i	436
27	A5	25	(Netherlands) Musch-Motorsport	(Netherlands) Derek Musch (Netherlands) Jacques Groenewegen (Netherlands) Michel Schaap (Netherlands) Michael Boertien (Netherlands) Simon Zijlstra	BMW M3 E46	430
28	D1	93	(Germany) RSR Motorsport	(Germany) Eberhard Rattunde (New Zealand) Wayne Moore (Germany) Heiner Immig (New Zealand) Maurice O'Reilly	Volkswagen Golf V R-TDI	429
29	D1	90	(Netherlands) Bas Koeten Racing	(Netherlands) Laurens Meijer (Netherlands) Gerrit Meijer (Netherlands) Johan Kraan (Netherlands) Gaston van den Broek	Seat Ibiza 1.9 TDI	428
30	A5	23	(United Kingdom) Moore International Motorsport	(United Kingdom) Will Moore (United Kingdom) Dave Cox (Belgium) Tom Cloet (Republic of Ireland) Ally McKever	BMW M3 E46 GTR	421
31	A1	75	(Australia) Team Mirage Australian 3	(Australia) Peter Leemhuis (Australia) Tony Alford (Australia) Paul Freestone	Mitsubishi Mirage RS	420
32	A2	52	(Germany) Martin Tschornia Motorsport	(Germany) Martin Tschornia (Croatia) Franjo Kovac (Germany) Hubert Nacken (Germany) Andreas Kramer	Renault Clio Cup RS	416
33	A5	21	(Germany) Tischner Motorsport	(Germany) Michael Tischner (Austria) Georg Silbermayr (Sweden) Ulf Karlsson (Germany) Matthias Tischner	BMW M3 E46	410
34	A5	62	(Sweden) New Beetle Racing	(Sweden) Anders Frid (Sweden) Jonas Hagström (Sweden) Peter Wallenberg (Sweden) Hans Simonsson (Sweden) Peter Larsson (Sweden) Sven Johan Lind	Volkswagen New Beetle	410
35	D1	84	(Germany) Martin Tschornia Motorsport	(Germany) Ulf Giljohann (Germany) Frank Giljohann (Germany) Frank Lohmann (Germany) Clemens Fischer (Germany) Ralph-Peter Rink	Alfa Romeo 147 JTD Cup	406
36	D1	82	(Netherlands) Fia Racing	(Netherlands) Eddie den Dekker (Netherlands) Rolf de Jong (Netherlands) Ben Verwoerdt (Netherlands) Jacco Hortensius	Seat Ibiza 1.9 TDI	397
37	A2	57	(Netherlands) US Carworld	(Netherlands) Rob Frijns (Netherlands) René Wijnen (Netherlands) Xavier Maassen (Netherlands) Pieter Dubois	Renault Clio Cup RS	395
38	D1	92	(Germany) Schumann Motorsport	(Germany) Harald Schmitt (Germany) Wolf-Rainer Schmitt (Germany) Roland Mühlbauer (Germany) Stefan Neuberger	Alfa Romeo 147 JTD	388
39	A2	6	(Netherlands) TLC Marketing & Promotions	(Netherlands) Rob Duyn (Netherlands) Anton van Watering (Netherlands) Len van Leeuwen	Renault Clio Cup RS	383
40	D1	88	(Netherlands) Hartge Holland	(Netherlands) Jan Evers (Netherlands) Henny van Doorn (Netherlands) Ronald Akkerman	Seat Ibiza 1.9 TDI	378
41	A1	72	(Germany) Tschornia Motorsport	(Germany) Christian Tschornia (Germany) Sebastian Tschornia (Germany) Frank Kräling (Germany) Joachim Steidel	Suzuki Swift GTR	370
42	D1	89	(Netherlands) JABE Racing Team	(Netherlands) Ewald Huzink (Netherlands) Gert Huzink (Netherlands) Rob Filart (Netherlands) Rob Buursen (Netherlands) Hendrik Richard Huzink	Seat Ibiza 1.9 TDI	356
43	D1	83	(United Kingdom) Brunswick Automotive	(United Kingdom) Giles Groombridge (United Kingdom) Dave Ashford (United Kingdom) James William Geddie (Hungary) Gabor Grigalek	Alfa Romeo 147 JTD	355
44	A5	33	(Italy) MAX Team SRL	(Australia) Gioavin Mezzasalma (Italy) Diego Alessi (Italy) Emanuelle Smurra (Italy) Stanislao Smurra	BMW M3	352
45	D1	98	(Germany) Altenburger Destillerie 2	(Germany) Werner Habermehl (Germany) Heribert Steiner (Germany) Martin Richter (Germany) Wido Rössler (Germany) Herbert von Danwitz	Alfa Romeo GT	339
46	A2	56	(Germany) Ahlden Motorsport	(Germany) Manfred Ahlden (Germany) Hannes Plesse (Germany) Timm Sandmeyer (Germany) Volker Vehlow	Renault Clio 2.0 RS	336
47	A1	71	(Germany) Pro Racing GBR	(Germany) Klaus Ebbing (Germany) Ernst Berg (Germany) Karsten Dempert (Germany) Ulfried Baumert (Germany) Bernd Küpper	Ford Puma 1.6 RS	336
48	D2	81	(Germany) Altenburger Destillerie	(Germany) Werner Habermehl (Germany) Dietrich Hueck (Germany) Mirco Schultis (Germany) Frank Diefenbacher (Germany) Herbert Schürg	Alfa Romeo 147 JTD	315
49	D1	85	(Germany) Sagarage Motorsport	(Germany) Jürgen Schumann (Germany) Peter Schumann (Germany) Roland Mühlbauer (United States) Paul Jenkins (Germany) Erik Schwarz	Alfa Romeo 147 JTD	289
50	A4	46	(Germany) Matador Rennsport Team 2		BMW M3 E36	282
51	A2	63	(Netherlands) Match Racing Clio	(Netherlands) Ronald Morien (Netherlands) Eric Struylaart (Netherlands) Mark Kroes (Netherlands) Nicky Catsburg	Renault Clio RS	268
52	A6	7	(Germany) CC Car Collection	(Germany) Peter Schmidt (Germany) Matthias Weiland (Germany) Jan-Erik Slooten (Germany) Claus Schunk (Germany) Harald Weiland	Porsche 911 GT3	264
DNC	A5	36	(Czech Republic) K&K Racing	(Czech Republic) Marcel Kusin (Czech Republic) Petr Kacirek (Czech Republic) Matej Kotrba (Czech Republic) Petr Valek	BMW E36 M3 GTR	253
DNC	A6	15	(Belgium) GPR Racing	(Belgium) Nicolas de Gastines (Belgium) Maxime Dumarey (Belgium) Guido Dumarey (Belgium) Guillaume Dumarey	Porsche 996 GT3 RS	240
DNC	A5	30	(Germany) Drexler Motorsport	(Germany) Markus Gedlich (Germany) Tom Schwister (Germany) Harald Grohs (Germany) Andreas Bovensiepen (Germany) Frank Schmickler	BMW M3 E46	218
DNC	A5	32	(Austria) Duller Motorsport 2	(Austria) Alexander Quester (Austria) Helmut Fleischmann (Austria) Lukas Lichtner-Hoyer (Austria) Klaus Engelhorn (Austria) Karl Wendlinger	BMW M3 E46	218
DNC	A4	44	(Italy) Valerio Leone Racing & Classic	(Italy) Valerio Leone (Italy) Giorgio Piodi (Monaco) Marc Faggionato (Italy) Jacques Natali	BMW M3 E36	192
DNC	A2	58	(Netherlands) A en J Racing	(Netherlands) Jan Rijgersberg (Netherlands) Jaap van der Ende (Netherlands) Jacky van der Ende (Netherlands) Henk Albronda	Renault Clio Cup RS	142
DNC	A2	5	(United Arab Emirates) Motor Works	(Netherlands) Ricardo Brkovic (Netherlands) Roy van der Weijden (Netherlands) Martijn Koene (Netherlands) Marc Wams	Volkswagen Golf GTI Cup	100
DNC	A2	61	(Germany) Schubert Motors 2	(Germany) Claudia Hürtgen (Sweden) Richard Göransson (Germany) Marc Hennerici (Sweden) Thed Björk (Germany) Torsten Schubert	BMW E46 320i S2000	89
DNC	A5	35	(Netherlands) X Racing	(Netherlands) Frank Nebig (Netherlands) Stefan de Groot (Netherlands) Jacques Gelebart (Netherlands) Milko Tas (Netherlands) Niek Jansen	Subaru WRX Turbo	62
DNC	A1	76	(Germany) Leipert Motorsport	(Germany) Marcel Leipert (Switzerland) Daniel Hadorn (Austria) Christopher Zoechling (Germany) Steffen Faas (Switzerland) Fredy Barth	Ford Fiesta	43
DNC	A2	51	(Germany) Paragon AG	(Germany) Klaus Dieter Frers (Germany) Wolfgang Schuhbauer (Germany) Armin Zumtobel (Germany) Anja Wassertheurer (Germany) Marcus Schurig	Ford Fiesta	39
DNC	A4	43	(Germany) Matador Rennsport Team 1	(Germany) Uwe Rentel (Germany) Jochen Krumbach (Germany) André Krumbach	BMW M3 E36	36
DNC	A2	42	(Germany) Realizer Team	(Germany) Stephanie Halm (Germany) Nicole Lüttecke (Germany) Kati Droste (Germany) Catharina Felser	Mazda RX8	34
DNC	A2	64	(United Kingdom) Damax	(United Kingdom) Robin Ward (United Kingdom) Aaron Scott (United Kingdom) Chris Catt (United Kingdom) Mike Furness	Honda Integra	19
DNC	A4	41	(Netherlands) Braspenning Racing	(Netherlands) Hank Kruijt (Netherlands) Iwan van Schelven (Netherlands) Willy Angenent (Netherlands) Ron Braspenning	BMW E46	2
