= Toto Wolff =

Austrian investor and motorsport executive (born 1972)

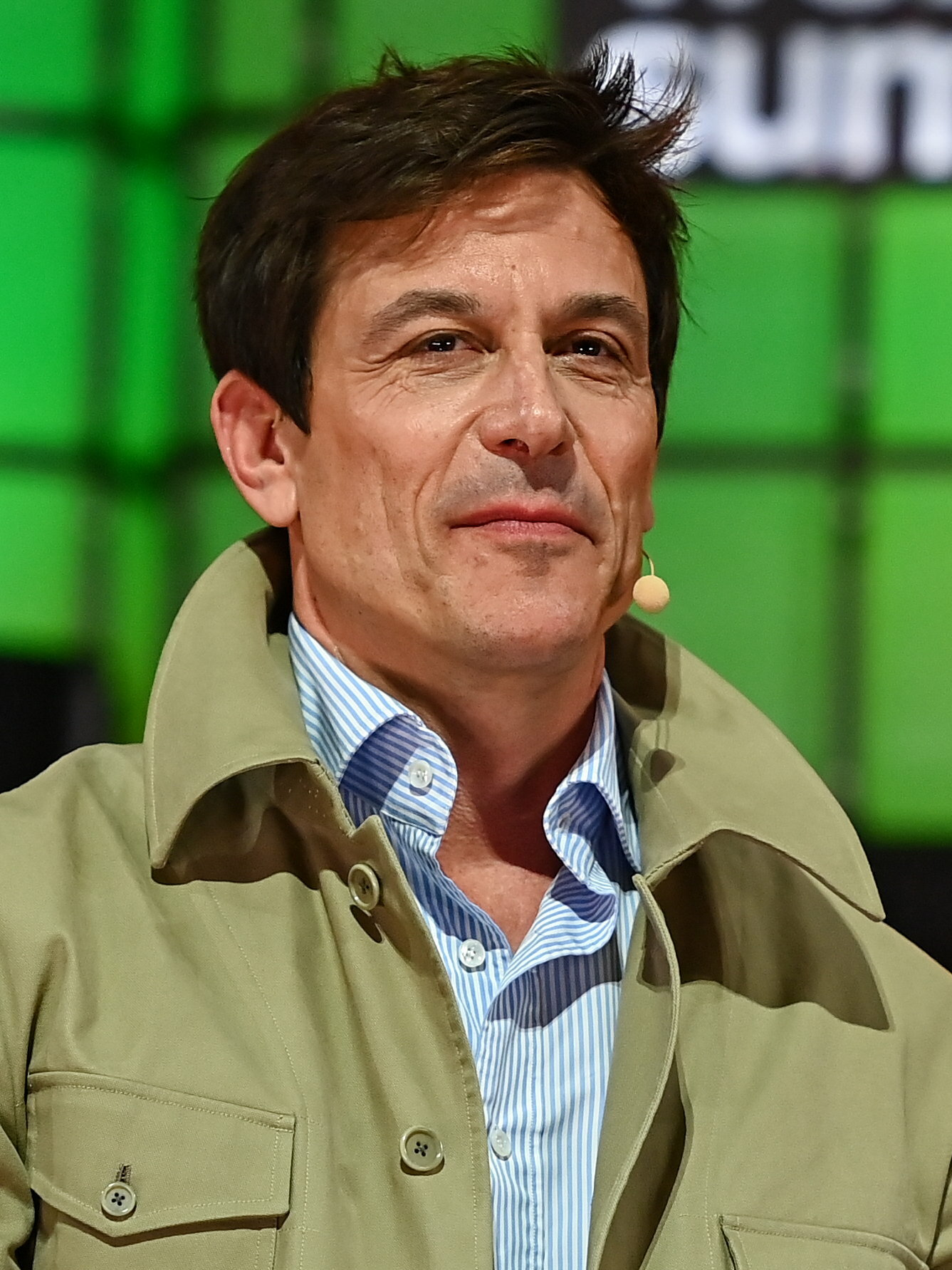
- Wolff in 2022
- Born: Torger Christian Wolff; 12 January 1972 (age 54); Vienna, Austria
- Education: Vienna University of Economics and Business (dropped out)
- Occupations: Investor; motorsport executive; racing driver
- Employers: Formula One; Williams (2009–2012); Mercedes (2013–present); Formula E; Mercedes-EQ (2019–2022)
- Title: Team Principal; Chief Executive Officer
- Spouse: Susie Wolff (m. 2011)
- Children: 3

Torger Christian "Toto" Wolff (German pronunciation: [volf], born 12 January 1972) is an Austrian motorsport executive, investor and former racing driver. Since 2013, Wolff has served as team principal, CEO and co-owner of Mercedes in Formula One, winning nine World Constructors' Championship titles between 2014 and 2026; he also served as director and CEO of Mercedes-EQ in Formula E, winning two Formula E World Teams' Championship titles.

Wolff began his motorsport career in the Austrian Formula Ford Championship and the German Formula Ford Series. He won his category in the 1994 24 Hours Nürburgring and later competed in the FIA GT Championship and Italian GT Championship. As an investor, Wolff founded Marchfifteen in 1998 and Marchsixteen Investments in 2004, initially focusing on Internet and technology companies. He specialises in strategic investments in medium-sized industrial and listed companies, which have included Williams F1 and German HWA AG.

== Early life ==
Torger Christian Wolff was born on 12 January 1972 in Vienna to a Polish mother and a Romanian father. His mother was a physician. He grew up in the city and was educated in the Lycée Français de Vienne, a prestigious French school. Wolff's father was diagnosed with brain cancer when he was eight years old. His parents separated following his father's diagnosis. His father died of the disease when Wolff was 15. Wolff has spoken about how his father's battle with brain cancer during his childhood shaped his outlook on life and leadership.

== Business career ==
Wolff founded investment companies Marchfifteen (1998) and Marchsixteen (2004), which initially focused on internet and technology company investments. Since 2003, Wolff has concentrated on strategic investments in medium-sized industrial and listed companies. Investments included the German HWA AG, in which Wolff bought a 49% stake in 2006, listing the company on the stock exchange in 2007. The company ran the Deutsche Tourenwagen Masters race program for Mercedes-Benz, developing F3 engines and the Gullwing Mercedes-Benz SLS AMG GT3 racing car.

Other investments included BRR Rallye Racing, one of the largest rally parts dealers in Europe. Wolff is also co-owner of a sports management company with former F1 driver Mika Häkkinen and was involved in the management of racing drivers such as Bruno Spengler, Alexandre Prémat and Valtteri Bottas. In April 2020, Wolff acquired a 4.95% stake in Aston Martin Lagonda Global Holdings plc as a financial investment, which subsequently was diluted to less than 1%. Wolff's partnership and operational role with Mercedes were unaffected by this transaction. In June 2020, Wolff held a 5% stake in Williams F1 which was sold in the purchase of Williams by Dorilton Capital. In August 2021, tabloid Le Journal de Montréal speculated that Wolff and Aston Martin F1 boss Lawrence Stroll were involved in insider trading with respect to Aston Martin shares, something Wolff refuted in comments to the same newspaper. This allegation was proven to be unfounded following confirmation from the BaFin in Germany and the FCA in the UK that they had found no evidence of wrongdoing.

Wolff was also Director and CEO of the Mercedes-EQ Formula E Team and occasionally attended Formula E races. In August 2021, Wolff was present in Berlin as Mercedes won both the drivers' and teams' championships in Formula E, at a race won by Venturi driver Norman Nato, where his wife, Susie Wolff, became the first female team principal to stand on the podium at a world championship motor race. With Venturi driver Edo Mortara finishing second in the drivers' championships, the Wolffs led their respective teams to first and second positions in the Formula E drivers' championship.

Wolff is vice-chairman of the Mary Bendet Foundation, founded in memory of a school friend who was a role model for a generation of friends. The Foundation aims to improve the quality of life for underprivileged children.

== Motorsport ==
Wolff started his motorsport career in 1992 in the Austrian Formula Ford Championship, driving in Austrian and German Formula Ford from 1992 to 1994. In 1994, he won the Nürburgring 24 Hours in his category. In 2002, Wolff finished in sixth place in the N-GT category in the FIA GT Championship and won one race. He switched to the Italian GT Championship in 2003, winning a race in 2004 with Lorenzo Case, while also teaming with Karl Wendlinger in the FIA GT Championship. Wolff was runner up in the Austrian Rally Championship in 2006, and winner of the 2006 Dubai 24 Hour. Wolff has also served as an instructor at the Walter Lechner Racing School and in 2009 became a lap-record holder on the Nürburgring Nordschleife in a Porsche RSR. Wolff also had overall responsibility for the Mercedes EQ Formula E Team before their entry and assets were purchased by McLaren following the conclusion of the 2021-2022 season.

== Formula One ==
In 2009, Wolff bought a share of the Williams Formula One Team and joined the board of directors. In 2012, he was named executive director of Williams F1 and the team took its last race win to date at that year's Spanish Grand Prix with Pastor Maldonado.

In January 2013, Wolff left Williams F1 to become an executive director of the Mercedes AMG Petronas Formula One Team with his business partner Rene Berger becoming non-executive director. In addition to joining the team as managing partner, he also acquired 30% of Mercedes-Benz Grand Prix Ltd, with a further 10% held by Niki Lauda and 60% by the parent company.

Wolff took over the coordination of all Mercedes-Benz motorsport activities, a responsibility previously held by Norbert Haug. In 2014, Wolff sold two-thirds of his Williams shares to American businessman Brad Hollinger. On 9 March 2016, Wolff sold his remaining shares in the Williams team.

As co-owner of both Williams F1 (where his wife Susie worked as a test driver until November 2015) and Mercedes Grand Prix, Wolff celebrated numerous podiums and successes for both teams, such as a 1–2–3–4 finish at the 2014 Austrian Grand Prix in Spielberg, Austria in his 'home race', as well as at Monza, Italy, in both Qualifying and Race classifications.

In 2020, Mercedes won its record seventh consecutive double world championship. The record was previously held by Ferrari when it won five consecutive double world championships between 2000 and 2004. Mercedes also holds the record of seven consecutive Driver's Championships from 2014 to 2020. In 2020, Mercedes' record of seven consecutive Constructor's Championships surpassed that of Ferrari's six consecutive Constructor's Championships set between 1999 and 2004. Wolff's achievements were recognised through the presentation of a John Bolster Award from Jean Todt at the 2018 Autosport Awards. Wolff subsequently received the President's Award from Todt, along with team non-executive chairman Niki Lauda, at the 2018 FIA Prize Giving Gala held in St Petersburg, Russia.

2018 proved the most successful motorsport year in the history of Mercedes-Benz. The company won both F1 titles, the Formula 2 title with George Russell, the Formula 3 European Championship with Mick Schumacher, all three titles in its final season of DTM competition with Gary Paffett securing the drivers' title, both F1 Esports titles with Brendon Leigh as the driver's champion, and numerous championships in customer racing.

For 2019, Mercedes continued its success by securing a sixth consecutive double world championship at the Japanese GP, when the team secured the Constructors' title and only one of Lewis Hamilton and Valtteri Bottas could still become Drivers' champion. This is an unprecedented achievement in the history of the sport. As of 2019, Wolff is the only Team Principal who has won more than five consecutive double world championships.

In 2020, Mercedes secured a seventh consecutive double world championship. The championship set an all-time record of consecutive constructors' championships, ahead of the six Ferrari achieved from 1999 to 2004. In the same season, Hamilton became the most successful driver in terms of race wins at the 2020 Portuguese GP and secured a seventh world drivers' championship at the Turkish GP to tie the record held by Michael Schumacher. The team followed up the achievement with an eighth consecutive constructors' world championship in 2021, but narrowly missed out on the drivers' crown after a controversial Abu Dhabi Grand Prix, in which Max Verstappen edged out Hamilton for the title.

Since the introduction of the turbo-hybrid regulations in 2014, Mercedes has won 130 of 273 races under Wolff's leadership. The team has taken 138 pole positions, and 302 from 546 possible podium finishes. Since Wolff joined Mercedes in 2013, the team has achieved a winning percentage of 46%.

After the 2020 F1 season, Wolff signed a new deal with Mercedes to continue as team principal and CEO for at least another three years, increasing his ownership stake to 33% upon investment from Ineos, becoming equal shareholders with Daimler AG.

After the 2023 F1 season, Wolff signed a new three-year deal to stay on as the team principal and chief executive of the Mercedes team.

As of 2023, Wolff's net worth is estimated at US$1.6 billion.

== Academic work ==
Wolff was awarded an Honorary Doctorate from Cranfield University for his services to Motorsport in May 2021.

In November 2021, Wolff was appointed to an Associate Fellowship of Oxford's Saïd Business School for two years to transfer his understanding of high-performance culture, team leadership, and personal effectiveness from the racetracks into the classroom.

In February 2022, Wolff's leadership of the Mercedes-AMG Petronas F1 Team was the subject of a Harvard Business School case study, authored by Anita Elberse. Wolff visited Harvard on 3 March 2022 to teach the case study to MBA students and lead a discussion on high-performance leadership and organisational culture.

In May 2022, Wolff was named as an executive fellow at Harvard Business School, a role in which he will serve as guest lecturer alongside Professor Anita Elberse.

"It's really difficult to find a team that has won what is effectively a world championship eight times in a row. Usually complacency sets in, or some other factor makes it impossible for the team to perform at the highest level. We tend to see very short life cycles for teams, but Wolff has kept his team at the top for eight years now. I find that really fascinating" said Elberse.

== Personal life ==
Wolff is married to Susie Wolff (née Stoddart), a Scottish former racecar driver and current managing director of F1 Academy. He proposed to her on a boat in Venice. They married in October 2011, and live in Monaco. On 10 April 2017, Susie gave birth to their only child together, a son. He has two other children, a son and a daughter, Benedict and Rosa, from a previous marriage to a woman named Stephanie. Wolff is fluent in German, English, French, Italian, Spanish, and Polish.

Wolff has spoken about his mental health struggles during his career in Formula 1. In a Sky Sports interview, he stated he would struggle "for months not being able to have a clear thought". Wolff described his mental well-being as his "super-power" whilst receiving professional help from a psychologist and acknowledging his wife, Susie Wolff, as a "strong rock" during these harder times. Red Bull's former team principal, Christian Horner, praises Wolff for "having the courage" to open up about his mental health after stating to The Sunday Times that he has seen a psychiatrist since 2004 and has had "over 500 hours" of therapy.
