= 2018 6 Hours of Buriram =

The Track map of the Buriram International Circuit

The 2018 6 Hours of Buriam was the third round of the 2017-18 Asian Le Mans Series season. It took place on January 13, 2018, at Buriram International Circuit in Buriram, Thailand.

== Qualifying ==
=== Qualifying results ===
Pole positions in each class are indicated in bold.

Pos.	Class	No.	Entry	Chassis	Time
1	**LMP2**	**8**	**(China) Jackie Chan DC Racing X Jota**	**Oreca 05-Nissan**	**1:25.597**
2	LMP2	37	(China) BBT	Ligier JS P2-Nissan	1:25.606
3	LMP2	7	(China) Jackie Chan DC Racing X Jota	Oreca 05-Nissan	1:25.713
4	LMP2	4	(Slovakia) ARC Bratislava	Ligier JS P2-Nissan	1:26.796
5	**LMP3**	**18**	**(Hong Kong) KCMG**	**Ligier JS P3**	**1:28.751**
6	LMP2	25	(Portugal) Algarve Pro Racing	Ligier JS P2-Nissan	1:29.093
7	LMP3	6	(China) Jackie Chan DC Racing X Jota	Ligier JS P3	1:29.613
8	LMP3	65	(Malaysia) Viper Niza Racing	Ligier JS P3	1:29.818
9	LMP3	1	(Hong Kong) WIN Motorsport	Ligier JS P3	1:29.958
10	LMP3	11	(Chinese Taipei) Taiwan Beer GH Motorsport	Ligier JS P3	1:30.045
11	**GT**	**90**	**(Chinese Taipei) FIST-Team AAI**	**Ferrari 488 GT3**	**1:32.685**
12	GT	66	(China) TianShi Racing Team	Audi R8 LMS	1:32.686
13	**GTC**	**77**	**(New Zealand) Team NZ**	**Porsche 997 GT3 Cup**	**1:46.877**
14	GT	91	(Chinese Taipei) FIST-Team AAI	BMW M6 GT3	—

== Race ==
=== Race results ===
Class winners are in bold.

Pos.	Class	No.	Entry	Drivers	Chassis	Laps
Pos.	Class	No.	Entry	Drivers	Engine	Laps
1	**LMP2**	**7**	**(China) Jackie Chan DC Racing X Jota**	**(Malaysia) Weiron Tan** **(Malaysia) Jazeman Jaafar** **(Malaysia) Afiq Yazid**	**Oreca 05**	**237**
1	**LMP2**	**7**	**(China) Jackie Chan DC Racing X Jota**	**(Malaysia) Weiron Tan** **(Malaysia) Jazeman Jaafar** **(Malaysia) Afiq Yazid**	**Nissan VK45DE 4.5 L V8**	**237**
2	LMP2	8	(China) Jackie Chan DC Racing X Jota	(France) Thomas Laurent (United Kingdom) Harrison Newey (Monaco) Stéphane Richelmi	Oreca 05	237
2	LMP2	8	(China) Jackie Chan DC Racing X Jota	(France) Thomas Laurent (United Kingdom) Harrison Newey (Monaco) Stéphane Richelmi	Nissan VK45DE 4.5 L V8	237
3	LMP2	37	(China) BBT	(Brazil) Pipo Derani (China) Anthony Liu (Italy) Davide Rizzo	Ligier JS P2	236
3	LMP2	37	(China) BBT	(Brazil) Pipo Derani (China) Anthony Liu (Italy) Davide Rizzo	Nissan VK45DE 4.5 L V8	236
4	LMP2	4	(Slovakia) ARC Bratislava	(Latvia) Konstantīns Calko (Slovakia) Miroslav Konôpka (Colombia) Gustavo Yacamán	Ligier JS P2	232
4	LMP2	4	(Slovakia) ARC Bratislava	(Latvia) Konstantīns Calko (Slovakia) Miroslav Konôpka (Colombia) Gustavo Yacamán	Nissan VK45DE 4.5 L V8	232
5	**LMP3**	**18**	**(Hong Kong) KCMG**	**(Australia) Josh Burdon** **(Italy) Louis Prette** **(China) Neric Wei**	**Ligier JS P3**	**227**
5	**LMP3**	**18**	**(Hong Kong) KCMG**	**(Australia) Josh Burdon** **(Italy) Louis Prette** **(China) Neric Wei**	**Nissan VK50 5.0 L V8**	**227**
6	LMP3	11	(Chinese Taipei) Taiwan Beer GH Motorsport	(Chinese Taipei) Hanss Lin (Australia) Scott Andrews (China) Ye Hongli	Ligier JS P3	225
6	LMP3	11	(Chinese Taipei) Taiwan Beer GH Motorsport	(Chinese Taipei) Hanss Lin (Australia) Scott Andrews (China) Ye Hongli	Nissan VK50 5.0 L V8	225
7	**GT**	**91**	**(Chinese Taipei) FIST-Team AAI**	**(Chinese Taipei) Jun-San Chen** **(Finland) Jesse Krohn** **(Australia) Chaz Mostert**	**BMW M6 GT3**	**220**
7	**GT**	**91**	**(Chinese Taipei) FIST-Team AAI**	**(Chinese Taipei) Jun-San Chen** **(Finland) Jesse Krohn** **(Australia) Chaz Mostert**	**BMW 4.4 L V8**	**220**
8	LMP3	1	(Hong Kong) WIN Motorsport	(United Kingdom) Richard Bradley (France) Philippe Descombes (Hong Kong) William Lok	Ligier JS P3	219
8	LMP3	1	(Hong Kong) WIN Motorsport	(United Kingdom) Richard Bradley (France) Philippe Descombes (Hong Kong) William Lok	Nissan VK50 5.0 L V8	219
9	GT	66	(China) TianShi Racing Team	(China) Weian Chen (Italy) Max Wiser (Hong Kong) Alex Au	Audi R8 LMS	218
9	GT	66	(China) TianShi Racing Team	(China) Weian Chen (Italy) Max Wiser (Hong Kong) Alex Au	Audi 5.2 L V10	218
10	LMP3	6	(China) Jackie Chan DC Racing X Jota	(United States) Patrick Byrne (United States) Guy Cosmo (France) Gabriel Aubry	Ligier JS P3	208
10	LMP3	6	(China) Jackie Chan DC Racing X Jota	(United States) Patrick Byrne (United States) Guy Cosmo (France) Gabriel Aubry	Nissan VK50 5.0 L V8	208
11	GT	90	(Chinese Taipei) FIST-Team AAI	(United Kingdom) Ollie Millroy (China) Lam Yu (Italy) Marco Cioci	Ferrari 488 GT3	189
11	GT	90	(Chinese Taipei) FIST-Team AAI	(United Kingdom) Ollie Millroy (China) Lam Yu (Italy) Marco Cioci	Ferrari F154CB 3.9 L Turbo V8	189
12	**GTC**	**77**	**(New Zealand) Team NZ**	**(New Zealand) Will Bamber** **(Republic of Ireland) John Curran** **(New Zealand) Graeme Dowsett**	**Porsche 997 GT3 Cup**	**188**
12	**GTC**	**77**	**(New Zealand) Team NZ**	**(New Zealand) Will Bamber** **(Republic of Ireland) John Curran** **(New Zealand) Graeme Dowsett**	**Porsche 4.0 L Flat-6**	**188**
13	LMP3	65	(Malaysia) Viper Niza Racing	(Malaysia) Dominic Ang (Malaysia) Douglas Khoo (United Kingdom) Nigel Moore	Ligier JS P3	170
13	LMP3	65	(Malaysia) Viper Niza Racing	(Malaysia) Dominic Ang (Malaysia) Douglas Khoo (United Kingdom) Nigel Moore	Nissan VK50 5.0 L V8	170
DNF	LMP2	25	(Portugal) Algarve Pro Racing	(Netherlands) Ate de Jong (Australia) Dean Koutsoumidis (Canada) John Graham	Ligier JS P2	162
DNF	LMP2	25	(Portugal) Algarve Pro Racing	(Netherlands) Ate de Jong (Australia) Dean Koutsoumidis (Canada) John Graham	Nissan VK45DE 4.5 L V8	162
