= 2018 4 Hours of Sepang =

Auto race in Malaysia

The layout of the Sepang International Circuit

The 2018 4 Hours of Sepang was an auto race held on February 4, 2018, at Sepang International Circuit in Sepang, Malaysia. It served as the last race of the 2017-18 Asian Le Mans Series season.

== Qualifying ==
=== Qualifying results ===
Pole positions in each class are indicated in bold.

Pos.	Class	No.	Entry	Chassis	Time
1	**LMP2**	**33**	**(Philippines) Eurasia Motorsport**	**Ligier JS P2-Nissan**	**1:55.424**
2	LMP2	37	(China) BBT	Ligier JS P2-Nissan	1:55.881
3	LMP2	8	(China) Jackie Chan DC Racing X Jota	Oreca 05-Nissan	1:56.138
4	LMP2	7	(China) Jackie Chan DC Racing X Jota	Oreca 05-Nissan	1:56.644
5	**LMP3**	**18**	**(Hong Kong) KCMG**	**Ligier JS P3**	**1:58.552**
6	LMP3	65	(Malaysia) Viper Niza Racing	Ligier JS P3	1:59.176
7	LMP3	6	(China) Jackie Chan DC Racing X Jota	Ligier JS P3	1:59.458
8	LMP3	11	(Chinese Taipei) Taiwan Beer GH Motorsport	Ligier JS P3	2:00.406
9	LMP3	1	(Hong Kong) WIN Motorsport	Ligier JS P3	2:00.544
10	**GT**	**91**	**(Chinese Taipei) FIST-Team AAI**	**BMW M6 GT3**	**2:02.601**
11	GT	66	(China) TianShi Racing Team	Audi R8 LMS	2:02.829
12	LMP2	25	(Portugal) Algarve Pro Racing	Ligier JS P2-Nissan	2:03.178
13	GT	90	(Chinese Taipei) FIST-Team AAI	Ferrari 488 GT3	2:03.466
14	**GTC**	**77**	**(New Zealand) Team NZ**	**Porsche 997 GT3 Cup**	**2:14.665**
15	LMP2	4	(Slovakia) ARC Bratislava	Ligier JS P2-Nissan	—

== Race ==
=== Race results ===
Class winners are in bold.

Pos.	Class	No.	Entry	Drivers	Chassis	Laps
Pos.	Class	No.	Entry	Drivers	Engine	Laps
1	**LMP2**	**8**	**(China) Jackie Chan DC Racing X Jota**	**(France) Thomas Laurent** **(United Kingdom) Harrison Newey** **(Monaco) Stéphane Richelmi**	**Oreca 05**	**117**
1	**LMP2**	**8**	**(China) Jackie Chan DC Racing X Jota**	**(France) Thomas Laurent** **(United Kingdom) Harrison Newey** **(Monaco) Stéphane Richelmi**	**Nissan VK45DE 4.5 L V8**	**117**
2	LMP2	37	(China) BBT	(Brazil) Pipo Derani (China) Anthony Liu (Italy) Davide Rizzo	Ligier JS P2	117
2	LMP2	37	(China) BBT	(Brazil) Pipo Derani (China) Anthony Liu (Italy) Davide Rizzo	Nissan VK45DE 4.5 L V8	117
3	LMP2	33	(Philippines) Eurasia Motorsport	(Estonia) Marko Asmer (Malaysia) Nabil Jeffri (Australia) Jake Parsons	Ligier JS P2	117
3	LMP2	33	(Philippines) Eurasia Motorsport	(Estonia) Marko Asmer (Malaysia) Nabil Jeffri (Australia) Jake Parsons	Nissan VK45DE 4.5 L V8	117
4	**LMP3**	**6**	**(China) Jackie Chan DC Racing X Jota**	**(United States) Patrick Byrne** **(United States) Guy Cosmo** **(France) Gabriel Aubry**	**Ligier JS P3**	**113**
4	**LMP3**	**6**	**(China) Jackie Chan DC Racing X Jota**	**(United States) Patrick Byrne** **(United States) Guy Cosmo** **(France) Gabriel Aubry**	**Nissan VK50 5.0 L V8**	**113**
5	LMP3	11	(Chinese Taipei) Taiwan Beer GH Motorsport	(Chinese Taipei) Hanss Lin (Hong Kong) Shaun Thong	Ligier JS P3	112
5	LMP3	11	(Chinese Taipei) Taiwan Beer GH Motorsport	(Chinese Taipei) Hanss Lin (Hong Kong) Shaun Thong	Nissan VK50 5.0 L V8	112
6	LMP2	4	(Slovakia) ARC Bratislava	(Latvia) Konstantīns Calko (Slovakia) Miroslav Konôpka	Ligier JS P2	112
6	LMP2	4	(Slovakia) ARC Bratislava	(Latvia) Konstantīns Calko (Slovakia) Miroslav Konôpka	Nissan VK45DE 4.5 L V8	112
7	LMP3	1	(Hong Kong) WIN Motorsport	(United Kingdom) Richard Bradley (France) Philippe Descombes (Hong Kong) William Lok	Ligier JS P3	111
7	LMP3	1	(Hong Kong) WIN Motorsport	(United Kingdom) Richard Bradley (France) Philippe Descombes (Hong Kong) William Lok	Nissan VK50 5.0 L V8	111
8	**GT**	**91**	**(Chinese Taipei) FIST-Team AAI**	**(Chinese Taipei) Jun-San Chen** **(Finland) Jesse Krohn** **(Finland) Markus Palttala**	**BMW M6 GT3**	**110**
8	**GT**	**91**	**(Chinese Taipei) FIST-Team AAI**	**(Chinese Taipei) Jun-San Chen** **(Finland) Jesse Krohn** **(Finland) Markus Palttala**	**BMW 4.4 L V8**	**110**
9	LMP2	7	(China) Jackie Chan DC Racing X Jota	(Malaysia) Weiron Tan (Malaysia) Jazeman Jaafar (Malaysia) Afiq Yazid	Oreca 05	109
9	LMP2	7	(China) Jackie Chan DC Racing X Jota	(Malaysia) Weiron Tan (Malaysia) Jazeman Jaafar (Malaysia) Afiq Yazid	Nissan VK45DE 4.5 L V8	109
10	LMP3	65	(Malaysia) Viper Niza Racing	(Malaysia) Dominic Ang (Malaysia) Douglas Khoo (United Kingdom) Nigel Moore	Ligier JS P3	105
10	LMP3	65	(Malaysia) Viper Niza Racing	(Malaysia) Dominic Ang (Malaysia) Douglas Khoo (United Kingdom) Nigel Moore	Nissan VK50 5.0 L V8	105
11	**GTC**	**77**	**(New Zealand) Team NZ**	**(New Zealand) Will Bamber** **(Malaysia) Alif Hamdan** **(New Zealand) Graeme Dowsett**	**Porsche 997 GT3 Cup**	**101**
11	**GTC**	**77**	**(New Zealand) Team NZ**	**(New Zealand) Will Bamber** **(Malaysia) Alif Hamdan** **(New Zealand) Graeme Dowsett**	**Porsche 4.0 L Flat-6**	**101**
12	GT	90	(Chinese Taipei) FIST-Team AAI	(United Kingdom) Ollie Millroy (Thailand) Bhurit Bhirombhakdi (Thailand) Sarun Sereethoranakul	Ferrari 488 GT3	92
12	GT	90	(Chinese Taipei) FIST-Team AAI	(United Kingdom) Ollie Millroy (Thailand) Bhurit Bhirombhakdi (Thailand) Sarun Sereethoranakul	Ferrari F154CB 3.9 L Turbo V8	92
DNF	LMP3	18	(Hong Kong) KCMG	(Australia) Josh Burdon (Italy) Louis Prette (China) Neric Wei	Ligier JS P3	112
DNF	LMP3	18	(Hong Kong) KCMG	(Australia) Josh Burdon (Italy) Louis Prette (China) Neric Wei	Nissan VK50 5.0 L V8	112
DNF	GT	66	(China) TianShi Racing Team	(China) Weian Chen (Italy) Max Wiser (Australia) Mitchell Gilbert	Audi R8 LMS	81
DNF	GT	66	(China) TianShi Racing Team	(China) Weian Chen (Italy) Max Wiser (Australia) Mitchell Gilbert	Audi 5.2 L V10	81
DNF	LMP2	25	(Portugal) Algarve Pro Racing	(Netherlands) Ate de Jong (Australia) Dean Koutsoumidis (Canada) John Graham	Ligier JS P2	14
DNF	LMP2	25	(Portugal) Algarve Pro Racing	(Netherlands) Ate de Jong (Australia) Dean Koutsoumidis (Canada) John Graham	Nissan VK45DE 4.5 L V8	14
