= 2017–18 Asian Le Mans Series =

Sports car racing season

The 2017–18 Asian Le Mans Series was the sixth season of the Automobile Club de l'Ouest's Asian Le Mans Series. It is the fourth 24 Hours of Le Mans-based series created by the ACO, following the American Le Mans Series (since merged with the Rolex Sports Car Series to form the United SportsCar Championship), the European Le Mans Series and the FIA World Endurance Championship. The season began at the Zhuhai International Circuit in October 2017 and ended at Sepang International Circuit in Selangor on 4 February 2018.

== Calendar ==
The 2017–2018 calendar was revealed in February 2017. It was then updated in June, removing the Zhejiang round.

Rnd	Race	Circuit	Date
1	4 Hours of Zhuhai	Zhuhai International Circuit, Zhuhai, China	29 October 2017
2	4 Hours of Fuji	Fuji Speedway, Oyama, Japan	3 December 2017
3	6 Hours of Buriram	Chang International Circuit, Buriram, Thailand	13 January 2018
4	4 Hours of Sepang	Sepang International Circuit, Selangor, Malaysia	4 February 2018

== Entry list ==
=== LMP2 ===
Entrant/Team	Car	Engine	Class	No.	Drivers	Rounds
(Slovakia) ARC Bratislava	Ligier JS P2	Nissan VK45DE 4.5 L V8	P2	4	(Latvia) Konstantīns Calko	All
(Slovakia) ARC Bratislava	Ligier JS P2	Nissan VK45DE 4.5 L V8	P2	4	(Slovakia) Miroslav Konôpka	All
(Slovakia) ARC Bratislava	Ligier JS P2	Nissan VK45DE 4.5 L V8	P2	4	(Netherlands) Rik Breukers	1–2
(Slovakia) ARC Bratislava	Ligier JS P2	Nissan VK45DE 4.5 L V8	P2	4	(Colombia) Gustavo Yacamán	3
(China) Jackie Chan DC Racing X Jota	Oreca 05	Nissan VK45DE 4.5 L V8	P2	7	(China) David Cheng	1–2
(China) Jackie Chan DC Racing X Jota	Oreca 05	Nissan VK45DE 4.5 L V8	P2	7	(China) Ho-Pin Tung	1
(China) Jackie Chan DC Racing X Jota	Oreca 05	Nissan VK45DE 4.5 L V8	P2	7	(Malaysia) Jazeman Jaafar	2–4
(China) Jackie Chan DC Racing X Jota	Oreca 05	Nissan VK45DE 4.5 L V8	P2	7	(Malaysia) Weiron Tan	3–4
(China) Jackie Chan DC Racing X Jota	Oreca 05	Nissan VK45DE 4.5 L V8	P2	7	(Malaysia) Afiq Yazid	3–4
(China) Jackie Chan DC Racing X Jota	Oreca 05	Nissan VK45DE 4.5 L V8	P2	8	(France) Thomas Laurent	All
(China) Jackie Chan DC Racing X Jota	Oreca 05	Nissan VK45DE 4.5 L V8	P2	8	(United Kingdom) Harrison Newey	All
(China) Jackie Chan DC Racing X Jota	Oreca 05	Nissan VK45DE 4.5 L V8	P2	8	(Monaco) Stéphane Richelmi	All
(Portugal) Algarve Pro Racing	Ligier JS P2	Nissan VK45DE 4.5 L V8	P2	25	(Netherlands) Ate de Jong	All
(Portugal) Algarve Pro Racing	Ligier JS P2	Nissan VK45DE 4.5 L V8	P2	25	(Australia) Dean Koutsoumidis	All
(Portugal) Algarve Pro Racing	Ligier JS P2	Nissan VK45DE 4.5 L V8	P2	25	(Canada) John Graham	1, 3–4
(Philippines) Eurasia Motorsport	Ligier JS P2	Nissan VK45DE 4.5 L V8	P2	33	(Hong Kong) Alex Au	1
(Philippines) Eurasia Motorsport	Ligier JS P2	Nissan VK45DE 4.5 L V8	P2	33	(Japan) Keiko Ihara	1
(Philippines) Eurasia Motorsport	Ligier JS P2	Nissan VK45DE 4.5 L V8	P2	33	(Australia) Scott Andrews	2
(Philippines) Eurasia Motorsport	Ligier JS P2	Nissan VK45DE 4.5 L V8	P2	33	(Estonia) Marko Asmer	2, 4
(Philippines) Eurasia Motorsport	Ligier JS P2	Nissan VK45DE 4.5 L V8	P2	33	(Japan) Yoshiharu Mori	2
(Philippines) Eurasia Motorsport	Ligier JS P2	Nissan VK45DE 4.5 L V8	P2	33	(Malaysia) Nabil Jeffri	4
(Philippines) Eurasia Motorsport	Ligier JS P2	Nissan VK45DE 4.5 L V8	P2	33	(Australia) Jake Parsons	4
(China) BBT	Ligier JS P2	Nissan VK45DE 4.5 L V8	P2	37	(Brazil) Pipo Derani	All
(China) BBT	Ligier JS P2	Nissan VK45DE 4.5 L V8	P2	37	(China) Anthony Liu	All
(China) BBT	Ligier JS P2	Nissan VK45DE 4.5 L V8	P2	37	(Italy) Davide Rizzo	All

Icon	Class
P2	LMP2

=== LMP3 ===
Entrant/Team	Car	Engine	Class	No.	Drivers	Rounds
(Hong Kong) WIN Motorsport	Ligier JS P3	Nissan VK50VE 5.0 L V8	P3	1	(United Kingdom) Richard Bradley	All
(Hong Kong) WIN Motorsport	Ligier JS P3	Nissan VK50VE 5.0 L V8	P3	1	(France) Philippe Descombes	All
(Hong Kong) WIN Motorsport	Ligier JS P3	Nissan VK50VE 5.0 L V8	P3	1	(Hong Kong) William Lok	All
(China) Jackie Chan DC Racing X Jota	Ligier JS P3	Nissan VK50VE 5.0 L V8	P3	6	(United States) Patrick Byrne	All
(China) Jackie Chan DC Racing X Jota	Ligier JS P3	Nissan VK50VE 5.0 L V8	P3	6	(United States) Guy Cosmo	All
(China) Jackie Chan DC Racing X Jota	Ligier JS P3	Nissan VK50VE 5.0 L V8	P3	6	(France) Gabriel Aubry	3–4
(Chinese Taipei) Taiwan Beer GH Motorsport	Ligier JS P3	Nissan VK50VE 5.0 L V8	P3	11	(Chinese Taipei) Hanss Lin	All
(Chinese Taipei) Taiwan Beer GH Motorsport	Ligier JS P3	Nissan VK50VE 5.0 L V8	P3	11	(Hong Kong) Shaun Thong	1–2, 4
(Chinese Taipei) Taiwan Beer GH Motorsport	Ligier JS P3	Nissan VK50VE 5.0 L V8	P3	11	(China) Leo Ye	2–3
(Chinese Taipei) Taiwan Beer GH Motorsport	Ligier JS P3	Nissan VK50VE 5.0 L V8	P3	11	(Australia) Scott Andrews	3
(Hong Kong) KCMG	Ligier JS P3	Nissan VK50VE 5.0 L V8	P3	18	(Australia) Josh Burdon	All
(Hong Kong) KCMG	Ligier JS P3	Nissan VK50VE 5.0 L V8	P3	18	(Italy) Louis Prette	All
(Hong Kong) KCMG	Ligier JS P3	Nissan VK50VE 5.0 L V8	P3	18	(China) Neric Wei	All
(Malaysia) Viper Niza Racing	Ligier JS P3	Nissan VK50VE 5.0 L V8	P3	65	(Malaysia) Dominic Ang	All
(Malaysia) Viper Niza Racing	Ligier JS P3	Nissan VK50VE 5.0 L V8	P3	65	(Malaysia) Douglas Khoo	All
(Malaysia) Viper Niza Racing	Ligier JS P3	Nissan VK50VE 5.0 L V8	P3	65	(United Kingdom) James Winslow	2
(Malaysia) Viper Niza Racing	Ligier JS P3	Nissan VK50VE 5.0 L V8	P3	65	(United Kingdom) Nigel Moore	3–4
(Japan) TKS	Ginetta-Juno LMP3	Nissan VK50VE 5.0 L V8	P3	99	(Japan) Yuta Kamimura	2
(Japan) TKS	Ginetta-Juno LMP3	Nissan VK50VE 5.0 L V8	P3	99	(Japan) Shinyo Sano	2
(Japan) TKS	Ginetta-Juno LMP3	Nissan VK50VE 5.0 L V8	P3	99	(Japan) Takuya Shirasaka	2

Icon	Class
P3	LMP3

=== GT and GT Cup ===
Entrant/Team	Car	Engine	Class	No.	Drivers	Rounds
(China) TianShi Racing Team	Audi R8 LMS	Audi DAR 5.2 L V10	GT Am	66	(China) Weian Chen	All
(China) TianShi Racing Team	Audi R8 LMS	Audi DAR 5.2 L V10	GT Am	66	(Italy) Max Wiser	All
(China) TianShi Racing Team	Audi R8 LMS	Audi DAR 5.2 L V10	GT Am	66	(China) Peng Liu	1–2
(China) TianShi Racing Team	Audi R8 LMS	Audi DAR 5.2 L V10	GT Am	66	(Hong Kong) Alex Au	3
(China) TianShi Racing Team	Audi R8 LMS	Audi DAR 5.2 L V10	GT Am	66	(Australia) Mitchell Gilbert	4
(New Zealand) Team NZ	Porsche 997 GT3 Cup	Porsche 4.0 L Flat-6	GTC	77	(New Zealand) Will Bamber	3–4
(New Zealand) Team NZ	Porsche 997 GT3 Cup	Porsche 4.0 L Flat-6	GTC	77	(New Zealand) Graeme Dowsett	3–4
(New Zealand) Team NZ	Porsche 997 GT3 Cup	Porsche 4.0 L Flat-6	GTC	77	(Republic of Ireland) John Curran	3
(New Zealand) Team NZ	Porsche 997 GT3 Cup	Porsche 4.0 L Flat-6	GTC	77	(Malaysia) Alif Hamdan	4
(Chinese Taipei) FIST-Team AAI	Mercedes-AMG GT3 1 Ferrari 488 GT3 2–4	Mercedes-AMG M159 6.2 L V8 1 Ferrari F154CB 3.9 L Turbo V8 2–4	GT	90	(United Kingdom) Ollie Millroy	All
(Chinese Taipei) FIST-Team AAI	Mercedes-AMG GT3 1 Ferrari 488 GT3 2–4	Mercedes-AMG M159 6.2 L V8 1 Ferrari F154CB 3.9 L Turbo V8 2–4	GT	90	(China) Lam Yu	1–3
(Chinese Taipei) FIST-Team AAI	Mercedes-AMG GT3 1 Ferrari 488 GT3 2–4	Mercedes-AMG M159 6.2 L V8 1 Ferrari F154CB 3.9 L Turbo V8 2–4	GT	90	(Italy) Raffaele Marciello	1
(Chinese Taipei) FIST-Team AAI	Mercedes-AMG GT3 1 Ferrari 488 GT3 2–4	Mercedes-AMG M159 6.2 L V8 1 Ferrari F154CB 3.9 L Turbo V8 2–4	GT	90	(Italy) Marco Cioci	2–3
(Chinese Taipei) FIST-Team AAI	Mercedes-AMG GT3 1 Ferrari 488 GT3 2–4	Mercedes-AMG M159 6.2 L V8 1 Ferrari F154CB 3.9 L Turbo V8 2–4	GT	90	(Thailand) Bhurit Bhirombhakdi	4
(Chinese Taipei) FIST-Team AAI	Mercedes-AMG GT3 1 Ferrari 488 GT3 2–4	Mercedes-AMG M159 6.2 L V8 1 Ferrari F154CB 3.9 L Turbo V8 2–4	GT	90	(Thailand) Sarun Sereethoranakul	4
(Chinese Taipei) FIST-Team AAI	BMW M6 GT3	BMW S63 4.4 L Turbo V8	GT	91	(Chinese Taipei) Jun-San Chen	All
(Chinese Taipei) FIST-Team AAI	BMW M6 GT3	BMW S63 4.4 L Turbo V8	GT	91	(Finland) Jesse Krohn	All
(Chinese Taipei) FIST-Team AAI	BMW M6 GT3	BMW S63 4.4 L Turbo V8	GT	91	(Australia) Chaz Mostert	1–3
(Chinese Taipei) FIST-Team AAI	BMW M6 GT3	BMW S63 4.4 L Turbo V8	GT	91	(Finland) Markus Palttala	4

Icon	Class
GT	GT3
GT Am	GT3 Am
GTC	GT Cup

== Results ==
Bold indicates overall winner.

Rnd.	Circuit	LMP2 Winning Team	LMP3 Winning Team	GT Winning Team	GT Cup Winning Team	Results
Rnd.	Circuit	LMP2 Winning Drivers	LMP3 Winning Drivers	GT Winning Drivers	GT Cup Winning Drivers	Results
1	Zhuhai	**(China) No. 8 Jackie Chan DC Racing X Jota**	(Hong Kong) No. 18 KCMG	(Chinese Taipei) No. 91 FIST-Team AAI	No entries	Report
1	Zhuhai	**(France) Thomas Laurent** **(United Kingdom) Harrison Newey** **(Monaco) Stéphane Richelmi**	(Australia) Josh Burdon (Italy) Louis Prette (China) Neric Wei	(Chinese Taipei) Jun-San Chen (Finland) Jesse Krohn (Australia) Chaz Mostert	No entries	Report
2	Fuji	**(China) No. 8 Jackie Chan DC Racing X Jota**	(China) No. 6 Jackie Chan DC Racing X Jota	(Chinese Taipei) No. 90 FIST-Team AAI	No entries	Report
2	Fuji	**(France) Thomas Laurent** **(United Kingdom) Harrison Newey** **(Monaco) Stéphane Richelmi**	(United States) Patrick Byrne (United States) Guy Cosmo	(Italy) Marco Cioci (United Kingdom) Ollie Millroy (China) Lam Yu	No entries	Report
3	Buriram	**(China) No. 7 Jackie Chan DC Racing X Jota**	(Hong Kong) No. 18 KCMG	(Chinese Taipei) No. 91 FIST-Team AAI	(New Zealand) No. 77 Team NZ	Report
3	Buriram	**(Malaysia) Jazeman Jaafar** **(Malaysia) Weiron Tan** **(Malaysia) Afiq Yazid**	(Australia) Josh Burdon (Italy) Louis Prette (China) Neric Wei	(Chinese Taipei) Jun-San Chen (Finland) Jesse Krohn (Australia) Chaz Mostert	(New Zealand) Will Bamber (Republic of Ireland) John Curran (New Zealand) Graeme Dowsett	Report
4	Sepang	**(China) No. 8 Jackie Chan DC Racing X Jota**	(China) No. 6 Jackie Chan DC Racing X Jota	(Chinese Taipei) No. 91 FIST-Team AAI	(New Zealand) No. 77 Team NZ	Report
4	Sepang	**(France) Thomas Laurent** **(United Kingdom) Harrison Newey** **(Monaco) Stéphane Richelmi**	(France) Gabriel Aubry (United States) Patrick Byrne (United States) Guy Cosmo	(Chinese Taipei) Jun-San Chen (Finland) Jesse Krohn (Finland) Markus Palttala	(New Zealand) Will Bamber (New Zealand) Graeme Dowsett (Malaysia) Alif Hamdan	Report

== Teams championships ==
Points are awarded according to the following structure:

Position	**1st**	**2nd**	**3rd**	**4th**	**5th**	**6th**	**7th**	**8th**	**9th**	**10th**	**Other**	**Pole**
Points	25	18	15	12	10	8	6	4	2	1	0.5	1

=== LMP2 Teams Championship ===
Pos.	Team	Car	ZHU (China)	FUJ (Japan)	BUR (Thailand)	SEP (Malaysia)	Points
1	(China) #8 Jackie Chan DC Racing X Jota	Oreca 05	**1**	1	**2**	1	95
2	(China) #37 BBT	Ligier JS P2	2	**2**	3	2	70
3	(Slovakia) #4 ARC Bratislava	Ligier JS P2	3	4	4	4	51
4	(China) #7 Jackie Chan DC Racing X Jota	Oreca 05	Ret	3	1	5	50
5	(Philippines) #33 Eurasia Motorsport	Ligier JS P2	4	Ret		**3**	28
6	(Portugal) #25 Algarve Pro Racing	Ligier JS P2	5	5	Ret	Ret	20

Key
Colour	Result
Gold	Race winner
Silver	2nd place
Bronze	3rd place
Green	Points finish
Blue	Non-points finish
Blue	Non-classified finish (NC)
Purple	Did not finish (Ret)
Black	Disqualified (DSQ)
Black	Excluded (EX)
White	Did not start (DNS)
White	Race cancelled (C)
White	Withdrew (WD)
Blank	Did not participate

**Bold** – Pole

=== LMP3 Teams Championship ===
Pos.	Team	Car	ZHU (China)	FUJ (Japan)	BUR (Thailand)	SEP (Malaysia)	Points
1	(China) #6 Jackie Chan DC Racing X Jota	Ligier JS P3	3	1	4	1	77
2	(Hong Kong) #18 KCMG	Ligier JS P3	**1**	**Ret**	**1**	**Ret**	54
2	(Chinese Taipei) #11 Taiwan Beer GH Motorsport	Ligier JS P3	2	Ret	2	2	54
3	(Malaysia) #65 Viper Niza Racing	Ligier JS P3	4	2	5	4	52
4	(Hong Kong) #1 WIN Motorsport	Ligier JS P3	5	Ret	3	3	40
5	(Japan) #99 TKS	Ginetta-Juno LMP3		3			15

Key
Colour	Result
Gold	Race winner
Silver	2nd place
Bronze	3rd place
Green	Points finish
Blue	Non-points finish
Blue	Non-classified finish (NC)
Purple	Did not finish (Ret)
Black	Disqualified (DSQ)
Black	Excluded (EX)
White	Did not start (DNS)
White	Race cancelled (C)
White	Withdrew (WD)
Blank	Did not participate

**Bold** – Pole

=== GT Teams Championship ===
Pos.	Team	Car	ZHU (China)	FUJ (Japan)	BUR (Thailand)	SEP (Malaysia)	Points
1	(Chinese Taipei) #91 FIST-Team AAI	BMW M6 GT3	1	**2**	1	**1**	95
2	(Chinese Taipei) #90 FIST-Team AAI	Mercedes-AMG GT3	**2**	1	**3**	2	78
3	(China) #66 TianShi Racing Team	Audi R8 LMS	3	3	2	Ret	48

Key
Colour	Result
Gold	Race winner
Silver	2nd place
Bronze	3rd place
Green	Points finish
Blue	Non-points finish
Blue	Non-classified finish (NC)
Purple	Did not finish (Ret)
Black	Disqualified (DSQ)
Black	Excluded (EX)
White	Did not start (DNS)
White	Race cancelled (C)
White	Withdrew (WD)
Blank	Did not participate

**Bold** – Pole

=== GT Am Teams Championship ===
Pos.	Team	Car	ZHU (China)	FUJ (Japan)	BUR (Thailand)	SEP (Malaysia)	Points
1	(China) #66 TianShi Racing Team	Audi R8 LMS	**1**	**1**	**1**		78

Key
Colour	Result
Gold	Race winner
Silver	2nd place
Bronze	3rd place
Green	Points finish
Blue	Non-points finish
Blue	Non-classified finish (NC)
Purple	Did not finish (Ret)
Black	Disqualified (DSQ)
Black	Excluded (EX)
White	Did not start (DNS)
White	Race cancelled (C)
White	Withdrew (WD)
Blank	Did not participate

**Bold** – Pole

=== GTC Teams Championship ===
Pos.	Team	Car	ZHU (China)	FUJ (Japan)	BUR (Thailand)	SEP (Malaysia)	Points
1	(New Zealand) #77 Team NZ	Porsche 997 GT3 Cup			**1**	**1**	52

Key
Colour	Result
Gold	Race winner
Silver	2nd place
Bronze	3rd place
Green	Points finish
Blue	Non-points finish
Blue	Non-classified finish (NC)
Purple	Did not finish (Ret)
Black	Disqualified (DSQ)
Black	Excluded (EX)
White	Did not start (DNS)
White	Race cancelled (C)
White	Withdrew (WD)
Blank	Did not participate

**Bold** – Pole

== Drivers championships ==
Points are awarded according to the following structure:

Position	**1st**	**2nd**	**3rd**	**4th**	**5th**	**6th**	**7th**	**8th**	**9th**	**10th**	**Other**	**Pole**
Points	25	18	15	12	10	8	6	4	2	1	0.5	1

=== LMP2 Drivers Championship ===
Pos.	Driver	ZHU (China)	FUJ (Japan)	BUR (Thailand)	SEP (Malaysia)	Points
1	(Monaco) Stéphane Richelmi	**1**	1	**2**	1	95
1	(United Kingdom) Harrison Newey	**1**	1	**2**	1	95
1	(France) Thomas Laurent	**1**	1	**2**	1	95
2	(China) Anthony Liu	2	**2**	3	2	70
2	(Italy) Davide Rizzo	2	**2**	3	2	70
2	(Brazil) Pipo Derani	2	**2**	3	2	70
3	(Slovakia) Miroslav Konôpka	3	4	4	4	51
3	(Latvia) Konstantīns Calko	3	4	4	4	51
4	(Malaysia) Jazeman Jaafar		3	1	5	50
5	(Malaysia) Weiron Tan			1	5	35
5	(Malaysia) Afiq Yazid			1	5	35
6	(Netherlands) Rik Breukers	3	4			27
7	(Netherlands) Ate de Jong	5	5			20
7	(Australia) Dean Koutsoumidis	5	5			20
8	(Estonia) Marko Asmer		Ret		**3**	16
8	(Australia) Jake Parsons				**3**	16
8	(Malaysia) Nabil Jeffri				**3**	16
9	(China) David Cheng	Ret	3			15
10	(Hong Kong) Alex Au	4				12
10	(Japan) Keiko Ihara	4				12
10	(Colombia) Gustavo Yacamán			4		12
11	(Japan) Yoshiharu Mori		Ret			0
11	(Australia) Scott Andrews		Ret			0
11	(China) Ho-Pin Tung	Ret				0
11	(Canada) John Graham			Ret	Ret	0

Key
Colour	Result
Gold	Race winner
Silver	2nd place
Bronze	3rd place
Green	Points finish
Blue	Non-points finish
Blue	Non-classified finish (NC)
Purple	Did not finish (Ret)
Black	Disqualified (DSQ)
Black	Excluded (EX)
White	Did not start (DNS)
White	Race cancelled (C)
White	Withdrew (WD)
Blank	Did not participate

**Bold** – Pole

=== LMP3 Drivers Championship ===
Pos.	Driver	ZHU (China)	FUJ (Japan)	BUR (Thailand)	SEP (Malaysia)	Points
1	(United States) Guy Cosmo	3	1	4	1	77
1	(United States) Patrick Byrne	3	1	4	1	77
2	(Australia) Josh Burdon	**1**	**Ret**	**1**	**Ret**	54
2	(Italy) Louis Prette	**1**	**Ret**	**1**	**Ret**	54
2	(China) Neric Wei	**1**	**Ret**	**1**	**Ret**	54
2	(Chinese Taipei) Hanss Lin	2	Ret	2	2	54
3	(Malaysia) Douglas Khoo	4	2	5	4	52
3	(Malaysia) Dominic Ang	4	2	5	4	52
4	(Hong Kong) William Lok	5	Ret	3	3	40
4	(France) Philippe Descombes	5	Ret	3	3	40
4	(United Kingdom) Richard Bradley	5	Ret	3	3	40
5	(France) Gabriel Aubry			4	1	37
6	(Hong Kong) Shaun Thong	2	Ret		2	36
7	(United Kingdom) Nigel Moore			5	4	22
8	(United Kingdom) James Winslow		2			18
8	(China) Ye Hongli		Ret	2		18
8	(Australia) Scott Andrews			2		18
9	(Japan) Shinyo Sano		3			15
9	(Japan) Yuta Kamimura		3			15
9	(Japan) Takuya Shirasaki		3			15

Key
Colour	Result
Gold	Race winner
Silver	2nd place
Bronze	3rd place
Green	Points finish
Blue	Non-points finish
Blue	Non-classified finish (NC)
Purple	Did not finish (Ret)
Black	Disqualified (DSQ)
Black	Excluded (EX)
White	Did not start (DNS)
White	Race cancelled (C)
White	Withdrew (WD)
Blank	Did not participate

**Bold** – Pole

=== GT Drivers Championship ===
Pos.	Driver	ZHU (China)	FUJ (Japan)	BUR (Thailand)	SEP (Malaysia)	Points
1	(Chinese Taipei) Jun-San Chen	1	**2**	1	**1**	95
1	(Finland) Jesse Krohn	1	**2**	1	**1**	95
2	(United Kingdom) Ollie Millroy	**2**	1	**3**	2	78
3	(Australia) Chaz Mostert	1	**2**	1		69
4	(China) Weian Chen	3	3	2	Ret	48
4	(Italy) Max Wiser	3	3	2	Ret	48
5	(China) Lam Yu	**2**	1	**DNS**		45
6	(Italy) Marco Cioci		1	**3**		41
7	(China) Peng Liu	3	3			30
8	(Finland) Markus Palttala				**1**	26
9	(Italy) Raffaele Marciello	**2**				19
10	(Thailand) Sarun Sereethoranakul				2	18
10	(Thailand) Bhurit Bhirombhakdi				2	18
10	(Hong Kong) Alex Au			2		18
11	(Australia) Mitchell Gilbert				Ret	0

Key
Colour	Result
Gold	Race winner
Silver	2nd place
Bronze	3rd place
Green	Points finish
Blue	Non-points finish
Blue	Non-classified finish (NC)
Purple	Did not finish (Ret)
Black	Disqualified (DSQ)
Black	Excluded (EX)
White	Did not start (DNS)
White	Race cancelled (C)
White	Withdrew (WD)
Blank	Did not participate

**Bold** – Pole

=== GT Am Drivers Championship ===
Pos.	Driver	ZHU (China)	FUJ (Japan)	BUR (Thailand)	SEP (Malaysia)	Points
1	(China) Weian Chen	**1**	**1**	**1**		78
1	(Italy) Max Wiser	**1**	**1**	**1**		78
2	(China) Peng Liu	**1**	**1**			52
3	(Hong Kong) Alex Au			**1**		26

Key
Colour	Result
Gold	Race winner
Silver	2nd place
Bronze	3rd place
Green	Points finish
Blue	Non-points finish
Blue	Non-classified finish (NC)
Purple	Did not finish (Ret)
Black	Disqualified (DSQ)
Black	Excluded (EX)
White	Did not start (DNS)
White	Race cancelled (C)
White	Withdrew (WD)
Blank	Did not participate

**Bold** – Pole

=== GTC Drivers Championship ===
Pos.	Driver	ZHU (China)	FUJ (Japan)	BUR (Thailand)	SEP (Malaysia)	Points
1	(New Zealand) Graeme Dowsett			**1**	**1**	52
1	(New Zealand) Will Bamber			**1**	**1**	52
2	(Republic of Ireland) John Curran			**1**		26
2	(Malaysia) Alif Hamdan				**1**	26

Key
Colour	Result
Gold	Race winner
Silver	2nd place
Bronze	3rd place
Green	Points finish
Blue	Non-points finish
Blue	Non-classified finish (NC)
Purple	Did not finish (Ret)
Black	Disqualified (DSQ)
Black	Excluded (EX)
White	Did not start (DNS)
White	Race cancelled (C)
White	Withdrew (WD)
Blank	Did not participate

**Bold** – Pole
