= 2017 4 Hours of Fuji =

The Track map of the Fuji Speedway

The 2017 4 Hours of Fuji was the second round of the 2017-18 Asian Le Mans Series season. It took place on December 3, 2017, at Fuji Speedway in Oyama, Shizuoka, Japan.

== Qualifying ==
=== Qualifying results ===
Pole positions in each class are indicated in bold.

Pos.	Class	No.	Entry	Chassis	Time
1	**LMP2**	**37**	**(China) BBT**	**Ligier JS P2-Nissan**	**1:32.102**
2	LMP2	8	(China) Jackie Chan DC Racing X Jota	Oreca 05-Nissan	1:32.259
3	LMP2	7	(China) Jackie Chan DC Racing X Jota	Oreca 05-Nissan	1:32.698
4	LMP2	33	(Philippines) Eurasia Motorsport	Ligier JS P2-Nissan	1:33.610
5	**LMP3**	**18**	**(Hong Kong) KCMG**	**Ligier JS P3**	**1:35.255**
6	LMP2	4	(Slovakia) ARC Bratislava	Ligier JS P2-Nissan	1:35.909
7	LMP3	1	(Hong Kong) WIN Motorsport	Ligier JS P3	1:36.470
8	LMP3	65	(Malaysia) Viper Niza Racing	Ligier JS P3	1:36.683
9	LMP3	6	(China) Jackie Chan DC Racing X Jota	Ligier JS P3	1:36.970
10	**GT**	**91**	**(Chinese Taipei) FIST-Team AAI**	**BMW M6 GT3**	**1:37.861**
11	GT	90	(Chinese Taipei) FIST-Team AAI	Ferrari 488 GT3	1:38.055
12	GT	66	(China) TianShi Racing Team	Audi R8 LMS	1:39.021
13	LMP3	99	(Japan) TKS	Ginetta-Juno LMP3	1:39.717
14	LMP2	25	(Portugal) Algarve Pro Racing	Ligier JS P2-Nissan	1:41.268
15	LMP3	11	(Chinese Taipei) Taiwan Beer GH Motorsport	Ligier JS P3	—

== Race ==
=== Race results ===
Class winners are in bold.

Pos.	Class	No.	Entry	Drivers	Chassis	Laps
Pos.	Class	No.	Entry	Drivers	Engine	Laps
1	**LMP2**	**8**	**(China) Jackie Chan DC Racing X Jota**	**(France) Thomas Laurent** **(United Kingdom) Harrison Newey** **(Monaco) Stéphane Richelmi**	**Oreca 05**	**149**
1	**LMP2**	**8**	**(China) Jackie Chan DC Racing X Jota**	**(France) Thomas Laurent** **(United Kingdom) Harrison Newey** **(Monaco) Stéphane Richelmi**	**Nissan VK45DE 4.5 L V8**	**149**
2	LMP2	37	(China) BBT	(Brazil) Pipo Derani (China) Anthony Liu (Italy) Davide Rizzo	Ligier JS P2	149
2	LMP2	37	(China) BBT	(Brazil) Pipo Derani (China) Anthony Liu (Italy) Davide Rizzo	Nissan VK45DE 4.5 L V8	149
3	LMP2	7	(China) Jackie Chan DC Racing X Jota	(China) David Cheng (Malaysia) Jazeman Jaafar	Oreca 05	147
3	LMP2	7	(China) Jackie Chan DC Racing X Jota	(China) David Cheng (Malaysia) Jazeman Jaafar	Nissan VK45DE 4.5 L V8	147
4	LMP2	4	(Slovakia) ARC Bratislava	(Latvia) Konstantīns Calko (Slovakia) Miroslav Konôpka (Netherlands) Rik Breukers	Ligier JS P2	145
4	LMP2	4	(Slovakia) ARC Bratislava	(Latvia) Konstantīns Calko (Slovakia) Miroslav Konôpka (Netherlands) Rik Breukers	Nissan VK45DE 4.5 L V8	145
5	**LMP3**	**6**	**(China) Jackie Chan DC Racing X Jota**	**(United States) Patrick Byrne** **(United States) Guy Cosmo**	**Ligier JS P3**	**141**
5	**LMP3**	**6**	**(China) Jackie Chan DC Racing X Jota**	**(United States) Patrick Byrne** **(United States) Guy Cosmo**	**Nissan VK50 5.0 L V8**	**141**
6	**GT**	**90**	**(Chinese Taipei) FIST-Team AAI**	**(United Kingdom) Ollie Millroy** **(China) Lam Yu** **(Italy) Marco Cioci**	**Ferrari 488 GT3**	**140**
6	**GT**	**90**	**(Chinese Taipei) FIST-Team AAI**	**(United Kingdom) Ollie Millroy** **(China) Lam Yu** **(Italy) Marco Cioci**	**Ferrari F154CB 3.9 L Turbo V8**	**140**
7	GT	91	(Chinese Taipei) FIST-Team AAI	(Chinese Taipei) Jun-San Chen (Finland) Jesse Krohn (Australia) Chaz Mostert	BMW M6 GT3	140
7	GT	91	(Chinese Taipei) FIST-Team AAI	(Chinese Taipei) Jun-San Chen (Finland) Jesse Krohn (Australia) Chaz Mostert	BMW 4.4 L V8	140
8	LMP2	25	(Portugal) Algarve Pro Racing	(Netherlands) Ate de Jong (Australia) Dean Koutsoumidis	Ligier JS P2	138
8	LMP2	25	(Portugal) Algarve Pro Racing	(Netherlands) Ate de Jong (Australia) Dean Koutsoumidis	Nissan VK45DE 4.5 L V8	138
9	GT	66	(China) TianShi Racing Team	(China) Weian Chen (Italy) Max Wiser (China) Peng Liu	Audi R8 LMS	137
9	GT	66	(China) TianShi Racing Team	(China) Weian Chen (Italy) Max Wiser (China) Peng Liu	Audi 5.2 L V10	137
10	LMP3	65	(Malaysia) Viper Niza Racing	(Malaysia) Dominic Ang (Malaysia) Douglas Khoo (United Kingdom) James Winslow	Ligier JS P3	136
10	LMP3	65	(Malaysia) Viper Niza Racing	(Malaysia) Dominic Ang (Malaysia) Douglas Khoo (United Kingdom) James Winslow	Nissan VK50 5.0 L V8	136
11	LMP3	99	(Japan) TKS	(Japan) Yuta Kamimura (Japan) Shinyo Sano (Japan) Takuya Shirasaka	Ginetta-Juno LMP3	124
11	LMP3	99	(Japan) TKS	(Japan) Yuta Kamimura (Japan) Shinyo Sano (Japan) Takuya Shirasaka	Nissan VK50 5.0 L V8	124
DNF	LMP2	33	(Philippines) Eurasia Motorsport	(Australia) Scott Andrews (Estonia) Marko Asmer (Japan) Yoshiharu Mori	Ligier JS P2	134
DNF	LMP2	33	(Philippines) Eurasia Motorsport	(Australia) Scott Andrews (Estonia) Marko Asmer (Japan) Yoshiharu Mori	Nissan VK45DE 4.5 L V8	134
DNF	LMP3	11	(Chinese Taipei) Taiwan Beer GH Motorsport	(Chinese Taipei) Hanss Lin (Hong Kong) Shaun Thong (China) Ye Hongli	Ligier JS P3	128
DNF	LMP3	11	(Chinese Taipei) Taiwan Beer GH Motorsport	(Chinese Taipei) Hanss Lin (Hong Kong) Shaun Thong (China) Ye Hongli	Nissan VK50 5.0 L V8	128
DNF	LMP3	18	(Hong Kong) KCMG	(Australia) Josh Burdon (Italy) Louis Prette (China) Neric Wei	Ligier JS P3	61
DNF	LMP3	18	(Hong Kong) KCMG	(Australia) Josh Burdon (Italy) Louis Prette (China) Neric Wei	Nissan VK50 5.0 L V8	61
DNF	LMP3	1	(Hong Kong) WIN Motorsport	(United Kingdom) Richard Bradley (France) Philippe Descombes (Hong Kong) William Lok	Ligier JS P3	29
DNF	LMP3	1	(Hong Kong) WIN Motorsport	(United Kingdom) Richard Bradley (France) Philippe Descombes (Hong Kong) William Lok	Nissan VK50 5.0 L V8	29
