= 2017 4 Hours of Zhuhai =

The Track map of Zhuhai International Circuit

The 2017 4 Hours of Zhuhai was an auto race held on October 29, 2017. At the Zhuhai International Circuit in Zhuhai, China and served as the opening round of the 2017-18 Asian Le Mans Series.

== Qualifying results ==
Pole positions in each class are indicated in bold.

Pos.	Class	No.	Entry	Chassis	Time
1	**LMP2**	**8**	**(China) Jackie Chan DC Racing X Jota**	**Oreca 05-Nissan**	**1:27.615**
2	LMP2	7	(China) Jackie Chan DC Racing X Jota	Oreca 05-Nissan	1:27.761
3	LMP2	37	(China) BBT	Ligier JS P2-Nissan	1:27.979
4	LMP2	4	(Slovakia) ARC Bratislava	Ligier JS P2-Nissan	1:28.833
5	**LMP3**	**18**	**(Hong Kong) KCMG**	**Ligier JS P3**	**1:30.048**
6	LMP2	33	(Philippines) Eurasia Motorsport	Ligier JS P2-Nissan	1:30.830
7	LMP3	1	(Hong Kong) WIN Motorsport	Ligier JS P3	1:31.574
8	LMP3	6	(China) Jackie Chan DC Racing X Jota	Ligier JS P3	1:31.741
9	LMP3	11	(Chinese Taipei) Taiwan Beer GH Motorsport	Ligier JS P3	1:31.767
10	LMP2	25	(Portugal) Algarve Pro Racing	Ligier JS P2-Nissan	1:32.040
11	LMP3	65	(Malaysia) Viper Niza Racing	Ligier JS P3	1:32.501
12	**GT**	**90**	**(Chinese Taipei) FIST-Team AAI**	**Mercedes-AMG GT3**	**1:33.194**
13	GT	91	(Chinese Taipei) FIST-Team AAI	BMW M6 GT3	1:33.516
DNC	GT	66	(China) TianShi Racing Team	Audi R8 LMS	—

== Race results ==
Class winners are in bold.

Pos.	Class	No.	Entry	Drivers	Chassis	Laps
Pos.	Class	No.	Entry	Drivers	Engine	Laps
1	**LMP2**	**8**	**(China) Jackie Chan DC Racing X Jota**	**(France) Thomas Laurent** **(United Kingdom) Harrison Newey** **(Monaco) Stéphane Richelmi**	**Oreca 05**	**154**
1	**LMP2**	**8**	**(China) Jackie Chan DC Racing X Jota**	**(France) Thomas Laurent** **(United Kingdom) Harrison Newey** **(Monaco) Stéphane Richelmi**	**Nissan VK45DE 4.5 L V8**	**154**
2	LMP2	37	(China) BBT	(Brazil) Pipo Derani (China) Anthony Liu (Italy) Davide Rizzo	Ligier JS P2	153
2	LMP2	37	(China) BBT	(Brazil) Pipo Derani (China) Anthony Liu (Italy) Davide Rizzo	Nissan VK45DE 4.5 L V8	153
3	LMP2	4	(Slovakia) ARC Bratislava	(Latvia) Konstantīns Calko (Slovakia) Miroslav Konôpka (Netherlands) Rik Breukers	Ligier JS P2	151
3	LMP2	4	(Slovakia) ARC Bratislava	(Latvia) Konstantīns Calko (Slovakia) Miroslav Konôpka (Netherlands) Rik Breukers	Nissan VK45DE 4.5 L V8	151
4	LMP2	33	(Philippines) Eurasia Motorsport	(Hong Kong) Alex Au (Japan) Keiko Ihara	Ligier JS P2	150
4	LMP2	33	(Philippines) Eurasia Motorsport	(Hong Kong) Alex Au (Japan) Keiko Ihara	Nissan VK45DE 4.5 L V8	150
5	LMP2	25	(Portugal) Algarve Pro Racing	(Netherlands) Ate de Jong (Australia) Dean Koutsoumidis (Canada) John Graham	Ligier JS P2	149
5	LMP2	25	(Portugal) Algarve Pro Racing	(Netherlands) Ate de Jong (Australia) Dean Koutsoumidis (Canada) John Graham	Nissan VK45DE 4.5 L V8	149
6	**LMP3**	**18**	**(Hong Kong) KCMG**	**(Australia) Josh Burdon** **(Italy) Louis Prette** **(China) Neric Wei**	**Ligier JS P3**	**148**
6	**LMP3**	**18**	**(Hong Kong) KCMG**	**(Australia) Josh Burdon** **(Italy) Louis Prette** **(China) Neric Wei**	**Nissan VK50 5.0 L V8**	**148**
7	LMP3	11	(Chinese Taipei) Taiwan Beer GH Motorsport	(Chinese Taipei) Hanss Lin (Hong Kong) Shaun Thong	Ligier JS P3	148
7	LMP3	11	(Chinese Taipei) Taiwan Beer GH Motorsport	(Chinese Taipei) Hanss Lin (Hong Kong) Shaun Thong	Nissan VK50 5.0 L V8	148
8	LMP3	6	(China) Jackie Chan DC Racing X Jota	(United States) Patrick Byrne (United States) Guy Cosmo	Ligier JS P3	146
8	LMP3	6	(China) Jackie Chan DC Racing X Jota	(United States) Patrick Byrne (United States) Guy Cosmo	Nissan VK50 5.0 L V8	146
9	**GT**	**91**	**(Chinese Taipei) FIST-Team AAI**	**(Chinese Taipei) Jun-San Chen** **(Finland) Jesse Krohn** **(Australia) Chaz Mostert**	**BMW M6 GT3**	**144**
9	**GT**	**91**	**(Chinese Taipei) FIST-Team AAI**	**(Chinese Taipei) Jun-San Chen** **(Finland) Jesse Krohn** **(Australia) Chaz Mostert**	**BMW 4.4 L V8**	**144**
10	GT	90	(Chinese Taipei) FIST-Team AAI	(United Kingdom) Ollie Millroy (China) Lam Yu (Italy) Raffaele Marciello	Mercedes-AMG GT3	144
10	GT	90	(Chinese Taipei) FIST-Team AAI	(United Kingdom) Ollie Millroy (China) Lam Yu (Italy) Raffaele Marciello	Mercedes-AMG 4.0 L M178 twin-turbo V8	144
11	GT	66	(China) TianShi Racing Team	(China) Weian Chen (Italy) Max Wiser (China) Peng Liu	Audi R8 LMS	143
11	GT	66	(China) TianShi Racing Team	(China) Weian Chen (Italy) Max Wiser (China) Peng Liu	Audi 5.2 L V10	143
12	LMP3	65	(Malaysia) Viper Niza Racing	(Malaysia) Dominic Ang (Malaysia) Douglas Khoo	Ligier JS P3	142
12	LMP3	65	(Malaysia) Viper Niza Racing	(Malaysia) Dominic Ang (Malaysia) Douglas Khoo	Nissan VK50 5.0 L V8	142
13	LMP3	1	(Hong Kong) WIN Motorsport	(United Kingdom) Richard Bradley (France) Philippe Descombes (Hong Kong) William Lok	Ligier JS P3	139
13	LMP3	1	(Hong Kong) WIN Motorsport	(United Kingdom) Richard Bradley (France) Philippe Descombes (Hong Kong) William Lok	Nissan VK50 5.0 L V8	139
DNF	LMP2	7	(China) Jackie Chan DC Racing X Jota	(China) David Cheng (China) Ho-Pin Tung	Oreca 05	41
DNF	LMP2	7	(China) Jackie Chan DC Racing X Jota	(China) David Cheng (China) Ho-Pin Tung	Nissan VK45DE 4.5 L V8	41
