= Rik Breukers =

Dutch racing driver (born 1998)

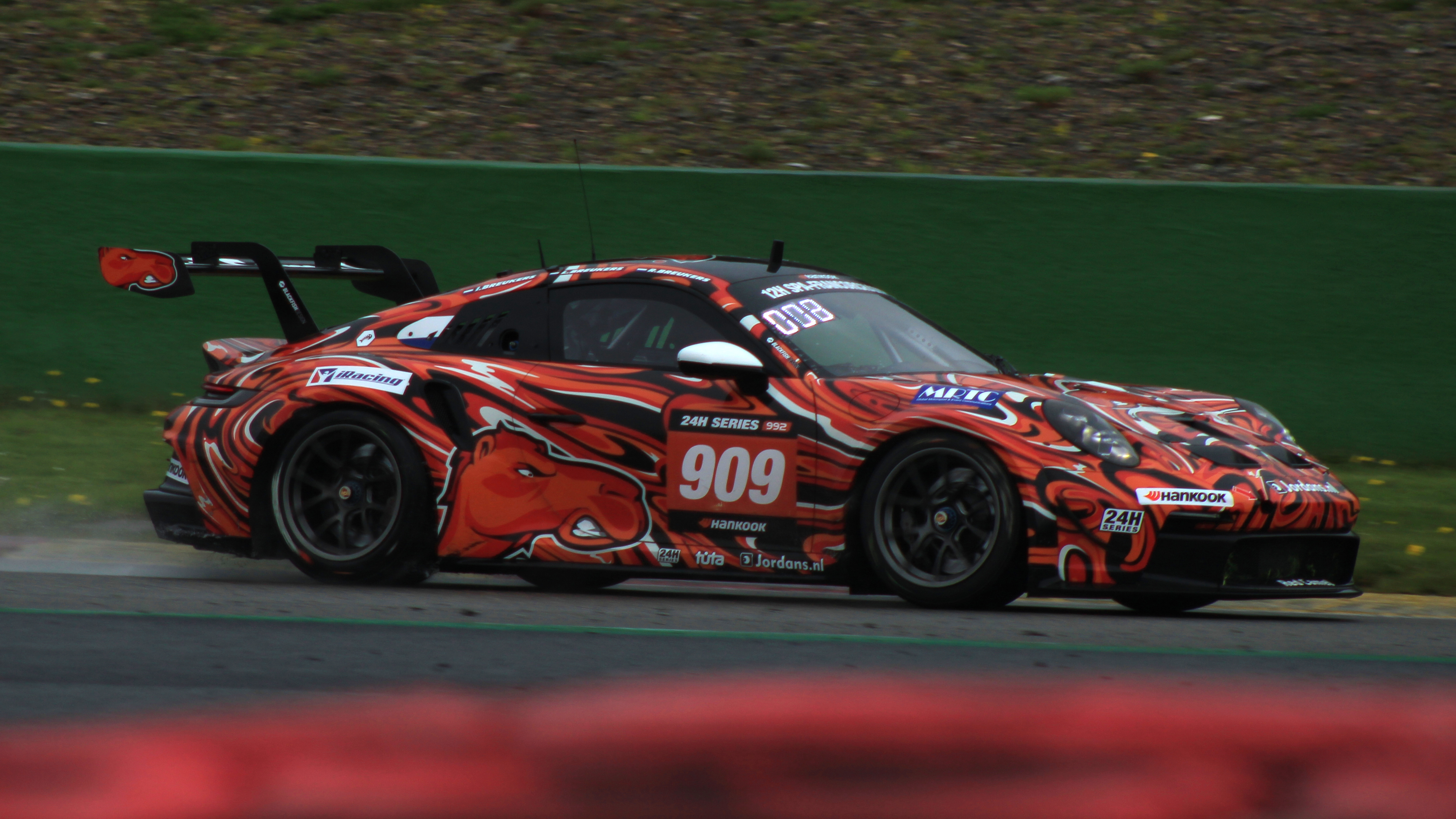
- Breukers in 2023
- Nationality: (Netherlands) Dutch
- Born: 14 May 1998 (age 28) Ven-Zelderheide, Netherlands
- Categorisation: FIA Silver

Championship titles
- 2023–24 2017 2017 2017 2016: Middle East Trophy – 992; Lamborghini Super Trofeo Asia – Pro-Am; Lamborghini Super Trofeo Middle East - Pro; 24H Proto Series – P2; Touring Car Endurance Series – TCR

Rik Breukers (born 14 May 1998) is a Dutch racing driver who last competed in the 24H Series driving a Porsche 992 GT3 Cup for Red Camel-Jordans.nl.

He is best known for his Lamborghini stint, winning the 24 Hours of Daytona (2018 and 2019) and 12 Hours of Sebring (2019) back-to-back in GTD for GRT Grasser Racing Team. He also won the Dubai 24 Hour overall in 2019 for Audi Sport Team Car Collection.

== Personal life ==
Breukers is the son of Ivo Breukers, an amateur racing driver.

== Career ==
Breukers made his car racing debut in 2015, racing in the 24H Series. During 2015, Breukers also won the Silverstone 24 Hours in Class 5, and finished second in the 24 Hours of Zolder's Class 1 CN class. Towards the end of the year, Breukers also made a one-off appearance in the 2015–16 MRF Challenge Formula 2000 Championship at Dubai, scoring a best result of fourth in race four.

The following year, Breukers joined GDL Racing to compete in Lamborghini Super Trofeo Europe, scoring a lone Pro-Am class win en route to runner-up honors in class at season's end. In parallel, Breukers raced for Red Camel-Jordans.nl in the Touring Car Endurance Series, finishing on the podium twice and taking the TCR class title. During 2016, Breukers also raced for Konrad Motorsport at the 24 Hours of Spa, and for EuroInternational in select rounds in the LMP3 class of the European Le Mans Series.

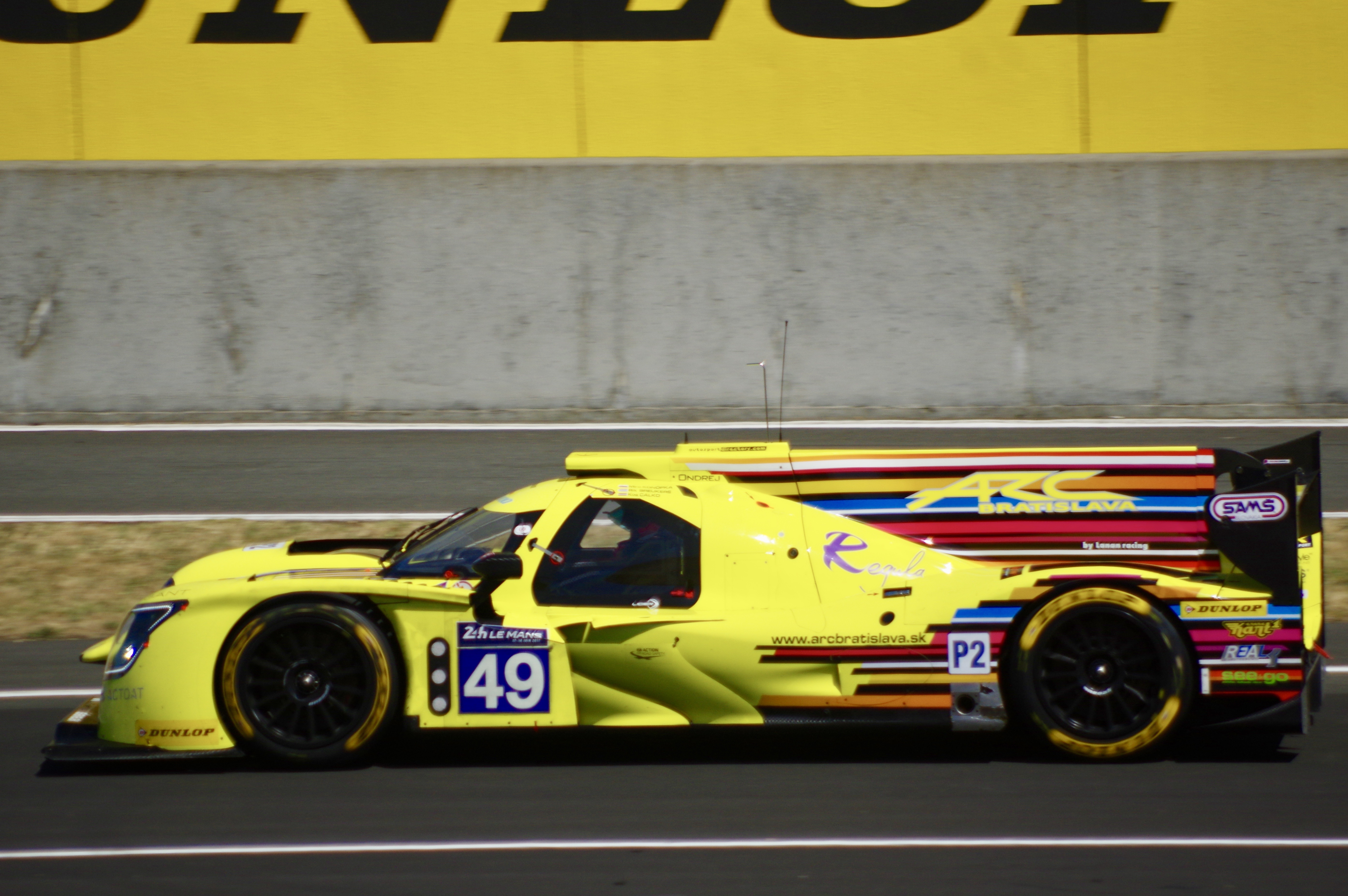
Breukers' ARC Bratislava LMP2 at the 2017 24 Hours of Le Mans.

Remaining with GDL Racing in Super Trofeo competition the following year, Breukers won the Middle East Pro title, as well as the Asia Pro-Am title and taking runner-up honors in the European series' Pro class. During 2017, Breukers also raced at the 24 Hours of Le Mans for ARC Bratislava in the LMP2 class, as well as racing for GRT Grasser Racing Team in select races of the 24H Series. At the end of the year, Breukers returned to ARC Bratislava for the first two rounds of the 2017–18 Asian Le Mans Series, taking a best result of third at Zhuhai.

In 2018, Breukers joined Imperiale Racing for his first season in International GT Open alongside Riccardo Agostini. In his first full season in GT3 machinery, Breukers won at Barcelona and four other podiums en route to a fifth-place points finish. During 2018, Breukers won the 24 Hours of Daytona in the GTD class for GRT Grasser Racing Team, as well as winning the 24 Hours of Silverstone in the TCR class for Red Camel-Jordans.nl. Breukers also raced at the 24 Hours of Spa for Barwell Motorsport, finishing second in the Silver Cup.

Joining Belgian Audi Club Team WRT for 2019, Breukers raced with them in both the Blancpain GT Series Endurance Cup and the Blancpain GT World Challenge Europe. Scoring a best result of 12th in the former, Breukers found more success in the latter, taking a Silver Cup win at the Nürburgring and four other class podiums to take fifth in the class' standings. During 2019, Breukers also won the 24 Hours of Daytona and the 12 Hours of Sebring in GTD for GRT Grasser Racing Team,, the Dubai 24 Hour for Car Collection Motorsport, and the only edition of the TCR Spa 500 for Red Camel-Jordans.nl.

After finishing 12th in the Silver Cup class of the GT World Challenge Europe Endurance Cup for Team WRT, Breukers returned to the series and the GT World Challenge Europe Sprint Cup the following year for Madpanda Motorsport. In the former, Breukers won the 24 Hours of Spa in class as he ended the season seventh in the Silver Cup, whereas in the latter, Breukers scored three class podiums to also finish seventh in the Silver Cup standings. During 2021, Breukers also won the 12 Hours of Mugello and the 24 Hours of Sebring in the TCR class for Red Camel-Jordans.nl and AC Motorsport, respectively.

Joining Red Camel-Jordans.nl on a full-time basis in the 24H GT Series the following year, Breukers won the 12 Hours of Mugello, the 12 Hours of Spa-Francorchamps and the 12 Hours of Hockenheimring in the 992 class to secure runner-up honors in class in the Europe series. Remaining with the team the following year, Breukers won the 24 Hours of Barcelona in the 992 class en route to a fourth-place points finish. At the end of the year, Breukers raced with the team in the 2023–24 Middle East Trophy, securing the 992 class title with wins at the 12 Hours of Kuwait and the Dubai 24 Hour.

After finishing third at the 2024 992 Endurance Cup for Red Camel-Jordans.nl, Breukers finished second at the same event the following year, as well as securing runner-up honors in the 992 class of both the Middle East Trophy and the 24H Series. At the end of the year, Breukers raced in the 2025–26 24H Series Middle East for the same team, winning the 12 Hours of Malaysia in the 992 class. For the rest of 2026, Breukers remained with the team to race in the 24H Series. Breukers won the 12 Hours of Paul Ricard and the Nürburgring to end runner-up in the 992 standings, as well as winning the third edition of the 992 Endurance Cup in September.

== Karting record ==
=== Karting career summary ===
Season	Series	Team	Position
2012	Dutch 4-Stroke Sprint Championship — RK1 Jr.		12th
2013	Winter Gold Cup — RK1 Jr.		2nd

== Racing record ==
=== Racing career summary ===
Season	Series	Team	Races	Wins	Poles	F/Laps	Podiums	Points	Position
2015	24H Series – SP2	Red Camel-Jordans.nl	3	0	0	0	0	0	NC
2015	24H Series – A6	GDL Racing	1	0	0	0	0	0	NC
2015	24H Series – A6	Car Collection Motorsport	1	0	0	0	0	0	NC
2015	24 Hours of Zolder – Class 1 CN 2000	Bas Koeten Racing	1	0	0	0	1	—N/a	**2nd**
2015	Silverstone 24 Hours – Class 5	Red Camel-Jordans.nl	1	1	0	0	1	—N/a	**1st**
2015–16	MRF Challenge Formula 2000 Championship	MRF Racing	4	0	0	0	0	11	15th
2016	24H Series – A6-Am	GDL Racing	2	0	0	0	0	12	NC
2016	Lamborghini Super Trofeo Europe – Pro-Am	GDL Racing	8	1	2	0	5	123	**2nd**
2016	Lamborghini Super Trofeo World Finals – Pro-Am	GDL Racing	2	1	0	0	1	20	**3rd**
2016	12 Hours of Sepang – GTC	GDL Racing Team Asia	1	0	0	0	1	—N/a	**2nd**
2016	Touring Car Endurance Series – TCR	Red Camel-Jordans.nl	3	0	0	0	2	63	**1st**
2016	24H Series – SPX	Red Camel-Jordans.nl	1	0	0	0	0	0	NC
2016	European Le Mans Series – LMP3	EuroInternational	2	0	0	0	0	10	20th
2016	Blancpain GT Series Endurance Cup – Pro-Am	Konrad Motorsport	1	0	0	0	0	4	41st
2016	Challenge Endurance PFV V de V	Century Motorsport	1	0	0	0	1	0	NC
2017	24H Series – A6	GRT Grasser Racing Team	2	0	0	0	0	25	31st
2017	Touring Car Endurance Series – TCR	Red Camel-Jordans.nl	4	0	1	0	0	8	12th
2017	24H Series – TCR	Red Camel-Jordans.nl	1	0	0	0	0	0	NC
2017	24H Series – TCR	Car Collection Motorsport	1	0	0	0	0	0	NC
2017	V de V Endurance Series – PFV	Century Motorsport	1	0	0	0	0	0	NC
2017	24H Series – SPX	GDL Racing Team Middle East	1	0	0	0	1	0	NC
2017	24H Proto Series – P2	Simpson Motorsport	2	??	??	??	??	68	**1st**
2017	24H Proto Series – P2	Atech - DXB	2	??	??	??	??	68	**1st**
2017	Lamborghini Super Trofeo Middle East - Pro	GDL Racing	6	5	3	0	5	81	**1st**
2017	Lamborghini Super Trofeo Europe – Pro	GDL Racing	12	2	1	1	9	127	**2nd**
2017	Lamborghini Super Trofeo Asia – Pro-Am	GDL Racing	12	6	4	7	11	151	**1st**
2017	Lamborghini Super Trofeo World Finals – Pro	GDL Racing	2	0	0	0	1	0	NC
2017	24 Hours of Le Mans – LMP2	ARC Bratislava	1	0	0	0	0	—N/a	19th
2017	ADAC TCR Germany Touring Car Championship	Bas Koeten Racing	2	0	0	0	1	0	NC
2017	TCR BeNeLux Touring Car Championship	Bas Koeten Racing	3	0	0	0	2	74	17th
2017–18	Asian Le Mans Series – LMP2	ARC Bratislava	2	0	0	0	1	27	6th
2018	IMSA SportsCar Championship – GTD	GRT Grasser Racing Team	1	1	0	0	1	35	45th
2018	24H GT Series – A6	GRT Grasser Racing Team	2	0	0	0	0	36	18th
2018	24H GT Series – A6	Ram Racing	1	0	0	0	0	36	18th
2018	Lamborghini Super Trofeo Middle East - Pro	GDL Racing	4	4	0	2	4	31	**3rd**
2018	Lamborghini Super Trofeo Europe – Pro-Am	GDL Racing	10	0	0	1	0		
2018	24H TCE Series – TCR	Red Camel-Jordans.nl	4	1	1	2	3	73	5th
2018	International GT Open	Imperiale Racing	14	1	0	1	5	89	5th
2018	Aston Martin Le Mans Festival – GT4	Academy Motorsport powered by Webheads	1	0	0	0	1	—N/a	**2nd**
2018	Blancpain GT Series Endurance Cup – Silver	Barwell Motorsport	1	0	0	0	1	39	10th
2018	Lamborghini Super Trofeo World Finals – Pro	FFF Racing Team	2	0	0	0	0	10	9th
2019	24H GT Series – A6 Pro	Car Collection Motorsport	2	1	0	0	1	14	9th
2019	24H GT Series – A6 Pro	Belgian Audi Club Team WRT	1	0	0	0	0	14	9th
2019	Blancpain GT Series Endurance Cup	Belgian Audi Club Team WRT	5	0	0	0	0	0	NC
2019	Blancpain GT Series Endurance Cup – Silver	Belgian Audi Club Team WRT	2	0	0	0	0	1	27th
2019	Blancpain GT World Challenge Europe – Silver	Belgian Audi Club Team WRT	10	1	1	0	5	75	5th
2019	IMSA SportsCar Championship – GTD	GRT Grasser Racing Team	2	2	0	1	2	70	35th
2019	24H GT Series – SPX	Mercedes-AMG Team Driving Academy	1	1	0	0	1	0	NC
2019	24H TCE Series – TCR	Red Camel-Jordans.nl	2	1	0	0	1	35	12th
2019	TCR Spa 500	Red Camel-Jordans.nl	1	1	0	0	1	—N/a	**1st**
2019	TCR Australia Touring Car Series	Melbourne Performance Centre	3	0	0	0	0	40	29th
2020	24H GT Series – GT3 Pro	MS7 by WRT	1	0	0	0	1	28	NC
2020	24H GT Series – GT3 Pro	Car Collection Motorsport	1	0	0	0	1	28	NC
2020	24H GT Series Europe – GT3 Pro	MP Motorsport	1	0	0	0	1	11	6th
2020	GT World Challenge Europe Endurance Cup – Silver	ROFGO Racing with Team WRT	5	0	1	1	0	31	12th
2020	Intercontinental GT Challenge	ROFGO Racing with Team WRT	1	0	0	0	0	0	NC
2020	GT World Challenge Europe Sprint Cup – Silver	Belgian Audi Club Team WRT	2	0	0	0	0	3.5	13th
2020	Dutch Winter Endurance Series	Red Camel-Jordans.nl	1	0	0	0	0	10	25th
2021	24H GT Series – GT3 Pro	GRT Grasser Racing Team	1	0	0	0	0	21	NC
2021	6 Hours of Abu Dhabi – TG	Red Camel-Jordans.nl	1	0	0	0	0	—N/a	6th
2021	24H GT Series – GTX	Red Camel-Jordans.nl	1	0	0	0	0	7	NC
2021	24H TCE Series – TCR	Red Camel-Jordans.nl	3	1	0	0	1	47	5th
2021	24H TCE Series – TCR	AC Motorsport	1	1	0	0	1	47	5th
2021	GT World Challenge Europe Endurance Cup – Silver	Madpanda Motorsport	5	1	0	0	1	57	7th
2021	GT World Challenge Europe Sprint Cup – Silver	Madpanda Motorsport	10	0	0	0	3	60	7th
2022	24H GT Series Continents – GT3 Pro	Barwell Motorsport	1	0	0	0	0	8	NC
2022	24H GT Series Europe – 992	Red Camel-Jordans.nl	5	3	0	0	4	74	**2nd**
2023	24H GT Series – 992	Red Camel-Jordans.nl	5	1	0	0	3	168	4th
2023–24	Middle East Trophy – 992	Red Camel-Jordans.nl	2	2	0	0	2	80	**1st**
2024	24H Series – 992	Red Camel-Jordans.nl	2	0	0	0	1	50	18th
2024	992 Endurance Cup	Red Camel-Jordans.nl	1	0	0	0	1	—N/a	**3rd**
2024	24H Series – GT3 Pro-Am	Red Camel by Juta Racing	1	0	0	0	0	40	19th
2025	Middle East Trophy – 992	Red Camel-Jordans.nl	2	1	0	0	1	45	**2nd**
2025	24H Series – 992	Red Camel-Jordans.nl	5	2	0	0	3	146	**2nd**
2025	992 Endurance Cup	Red Camel-Jordans.nl	1	0	0	0	1	—N/a	**2nd**
2025–26	24H Series Middle East – 992	Red Camel-Jordans.nl	3	1	0	0	1	42	7th
2026	24H Series – 992	Red Camel-Jordans.nl	5	2	0	0	3	140	**2nd**
2026	992 Endurance Cup	Red Camel-Jordans.nl	1	1	0	0	1	—N/a	**1st**

=== Complete GT World Challenge results ===
==== GT World Challenge Europe Endurance Cup ====
Year	Team	Car	Class	1	2	3	4	5	6	7	Pos.	Points
2016	Konrad Motorsport	Lamborghini Huracán GT3	Pro-Am	MNZ	SIL	LEC	SPA; 6H; 28	SPA; 12H; 29	SPA; 24H; 30	NÜR	41st	4
2018	Barwell Motorsport	Lamborghini Huracán GT3	Silver	MNZ	SIL	LEC	SPA; 6H; 26	SPA; 12H; 24	SPA; 24H; 19	CAT	10th	39
2019	Belgian Audi Club Team WRT	Audi R8 LMS Evo	Silver	MNZ; 27	SIL; Ret						25th	1
2019	Belgian Audi Club Team WRT	Audi R8 LMS Evo	Pro			LEC; 13	SPA; 6H; 30	SPA; 12H; 22	SPA; 24H; 12	CAT; Ret	NC	0
2020	ROFGO Racing with Team WRT	Audi R8 LMS Evo	Silver	IMO; 32	NÜR; Ret	SPA; 6H; 34	SPA; 12H; 35	SPA; 24H; 34†	LEC; 19		12th	31
2021	Madpanda Motorsport	Mercedes-AMG GT3 Evo	Silver	MNZ; Ret	LEC; 24	SPA; 6H; 9	SPA; 12H; 13	SPA; 24H; 11	NÜR; 21	CAT; 23	7th	57

==== GT World Challenge Europe Sprint Cup ====
Year	Team	Car	Class	1	2	3	4	5	6	7	8	9	10	Pos.	Points
2019	Belgian Audi Club Team WRT	Audi R8 LMS Evo	Silver	BRH; 1; 9	BRH; 2 Ret	MIS; 1; 25	MIS; 2; 9	ZAN; 1; 11	ZAN; 2; 25	NÜR; 1; 11	**NÜR**; **2**; 6	HUN; 1; 16	HUN; 2; 14	5th	75
2020	Belgian Audi Club Team WRT	Audi R8 LMS Evo	Silver	MIS; 1	MIS; 2	MIS; 3	MAG; 1	MAG; 2	ZAN; 1; 21	**ZAN**; **2**; 17	CAT; 1	CAT; 2	CAT; 3	13th	3.5
2021	Madpanda Motorsport	Mercedes-AMG GT3 Evo	Silver	MAG; 1; 4	MAG; 2; 13	ZAN; 1 Ret	ZAN; 2; 9	MIS; 1; 14	MIS; 2; 14	BRH; 1; 4	BRH; 2; 16	VAL; 1 Ret	VAL; 2; 7	7th	60

=== Complete European Le Mans Series results ===
(key) (Races in bold indicate pole position. Races in italics indicate fastest race lap in class. Results are overall/class)

Year	Team	Class	Car	Engine	1	2	3	4	5	6	DC	Points
2016	EuroInternational	LMP3	Ligier JS P3	Nissan VK50VE 5.0 L V8	SIL	IMO	RBR	LEC; 9	SPA	EST; 6	20th	10

=== 24 Hours of Le Mans results ===
Year	Team	Co-Drivers	Car	Class	Laps	Pos.	Class Pos.
2017	(Slovakia) ARC Bratislava	(Slovakia) Miroslav Konôpka (Latvia) Konstantīns Calko	Ligier JS P217-Gibson	LMP2	314	45th	19th

=== Complete Asian Le Mans Series results ===
(key) (Races in bold indicate pole position) (Races in italics indicate fastest lap)

Year	Team	Class	Car	Engine	1	2	3	4	Pos.	Points
2017–18	ARC Bratislava	LMP2	Ligier JS P2	Nissan VK45DE 4.5 L V8	ZHU; 3	FUJ; 4	BUR	SEP	6th	27

=== Complete IMSA SportsCar Championship results ===
(key) (Races in bold indicate pole position; races in italics indicate fastest lap)

Year	Entrant	Class	Make	Engine	1	2	3	4	5	6	7	8	9	10	11	Rank	Points
2018	GRT Grasser Racing Team	GTD	Lamborghini Huracán GT3	Lamborghini DGF 5.2 L V10	DAY; 1	SEB	MDO	BEL	WGL	MOS	LIM	ELK	VIR	LGA	PET	45th	35
2019	GRT Grasser Racing Team	GTD	Lamborghini Huracán GT3 Evo	Lamborghini DGF 5.2 L V10	DAY; 1	SEB; 1	MDO	DET	WGL	MOS	LIM	ELK	VIR	LGA	PET	35th	70

=== Complete International GT Open results ===
Year	Team	Car	Class	1	2	3	4	5	6	7	8	9	10	11	12	13	14	Pos.	Points
2018	Imperiale Racing	Lamborghini Huracán GT3	Pro	EST; 1 Ret	EST; 2; 3	LEC; 1; 12	LEC; 2; 16	SPA; 1; 3	SPA; 2; 9	HUN; 1; 4	HUN; 2; 2	SIL; 1; 9	SIL; 2; 5	MNZ; 1; 3	MNZ; 2; 5	CAT; 1; 4	CAT; 2; 1	5th	89
