= Buriram International Circuit =

Motorsport race track in Buriram, Thailand

Chang International Circuit
- Grand Prix Circuit (2014–present)
- Location: Buriram, Thailand
- Coordinates: 14°57′46.24″N 103°5′5.99″E
- Capacity: 50,000 (grandstand) + 50,000 (berm) = 100,000 total capacity
- FIA Grade: 1
- Broke ground: 2 March 2013; 13 years ago
- Opened: 4 October 2014; 12 years ago
- Construction cost: THB 2 billion
- Architect: Hermann Tilke
- Major events: Current: Grand Prix motorcycle racing Thailand motorcycle Grand Prix (2018–2019, 2022–present); Asia Road Racing Championship (2014–2019, 2022–present); Future: GT World Challenge Asia (2017–2019, 2023–2025, 2027); Former: Asian Le Mans Series; 4 Hours of Buriram (2016–2020); TCR Asia Series (2015–2016, 2024); Super GT (2014–2019); World SBK (2015–2019); WTCC Race of Thailand (2015)
- Website: http://www.bric.co.th/

Grand Prix Circuit (2014–present)
- Surface: Asphalt
- Length: 4.554 km (2.830 mi)
- Turns: 12
- Race lap record: 1:23.848 ( (New Zealand) Nick Cassidy, Ligier JS P217, 2020, LMP2)

'D' Circuit (2014–present)
- Surface: Asphalt
- Length: 3.126 km (1.942 mi)
- Turns: 8

The Buriram International Circuit (known as Chang International Circuit (ช้าง อินเตอร์เนชั่นแนล เซอร์กิต) for commercial purposes, but listed by its non-commercial name because of alcohol restrictions in some countries) is a motorsport race track in Buriram, Buriram Province, Thailand. The circuit was opened in October 2014. This is the first FIA Grade 1 and FIM Grade A circuit in Thailand.

== History ==
The Japanese Super GT has visited Buriram since 2014. Also, the TCR International Series, TCR Asia Series and GT Asia Series is scheduled to race at Buriram in October 2015, and the World Touring Car Championship in November 2015, and the Asian Le Mans Series in January 2016.

On 22 March 2015, the first ever Thailand round of the World Superbike Championship was held at the circuit. Both of the Superbike races were won by UK rider Jonathan Rea and the World Supersport race was won by Thai rider Ratthapark Wilairot, much to the delight of the Thai spectators.

On 23 June 2015, it was announced that the Porsche Carrera Cup Asia series would be visiting the circuit for the seventh and eighth rounds of the one-make series.

On 12 March 2016, the second Thailand round of the World Superbike Championship was held. UK rider Jonathan Rea again won race 1, UK rider Tom Sykes won race 2. The World Supersport race was won by the French rider Jules Cluzel.

On 11 March 2017, the third Thailand round of the World Superbike Championship took place. UK rider Jonathan Rea scored his hattrick of race 1 wins at the circuit and also won race 2. The World Supersport race was won by Italian rider Federico Caricasulo, local Thai rider Decha Kraisart came second.

In September 2017, Dorna Sports confirmed that MotoGP will be held at the Buriram International Circuit, with a three-year commitment running from 2018 to 2020 for a race called the PTT Thailand Grand Prix. In February 2021, the MotoGP contract was extended until at least 2026, and as of November 2025, was extended until at least 2031.

== Events ==
Current

- March: Grand Prix motorcycle racing Thailand motorcycle Grand Prix, Moto4 Asia Cup
- May: Asia Road Racing Championship, Thailand Super Series
- September: Asia Road Racing Championship
- November: Thailand Super Series

Future

- GT World Challenge Asia (2017–2019, 2023–2025, 2027)

Former

- Asian Formula Renault (2016)
- Asian Le Mans Series
  - 4 Hours of Buriram (2016–2020)
- Audi R8 LMS Cup (2016)
- Clio Cup China Series (2016)
- F3 Asian Championship (2019–2020)
- Formula 4 South East Asia Championship (2017–2019, 2025)
- Formula Masters China (2016)
- GT Asia Series (2015–2016, 2018)
- Lamborghini Super Trofeo Asia (2016–2018)
- Porsche Carrera Cup Asia (2015–2016, 2023–2024)
- Super GT (2014–2019)
- Superbike World Championship (2015–2019)
- Supersport World Championship (2015–2019)
- TCR Asia Series (2015–2016, 2024)
- TCR International Series (2015)
- World Touring Car Championship
  - FIA WTCC Race of Thailand (2015)

== Lap records ==
As of March 2026, the fastest official race lap records at the Buriram International Circuit are listed as:

Category	Time	Driver	Vehicle	Event
Grand Prix Circuit (2014–present): 4.554 km (2.830 mi)
LMP2	1:23.848	Nick Cassidy	Ligier JS P217	2020 4 Hours of Buriram
Super GT (GT500)	1:24.977	Yuhi Sekiguchi	Lexus LC 500 GT500	2018 Buriram United Super GT Race
LMP3	1:29.905	Josh Burdon	Ligier JS P3	2018 6 Hours of Buriram
MotoGP	1:30.487	Marco Bezzecchi	Aprilia RS-GP26	2026 Thailand motorcycle Grand Prix
Formula Regional	1:32.260	Mikhael Belov	Tatuus F3 T-318	2020 Buriram F3 Asia round
World SBK	1:32.724	Álvaro Bautista	Ducati Panigale V4 R	2019 Buriram World SBK round
GT3	1:33.055	Jesse Krohn	BMW M6 GT3	2018 6 Hours of Buriram
Super GT (GT300)	1:33.172	Katsuyuki Hiranaka	Nissan GT-R Nismo GT3 (2018)	2018 Buriram United Super GT Race
Audi R8 LMS Cup	1:33.356	Martin Rump	Audi R8 LMS	2016 Buriram Audi R8 LMS Cup round
Lamborghini Super Trofeo	1:33.698	Tim Slade	Lamborghini Huracán Super Trofeo	2018 Buriram Lamborghini Super Trofeo Asia round
Moto2	1:35.379	Manuel González	Kalex Moto2	2026 Thailand motorcycle Grand Prix
Porsche Carrera Cup	1:37.186	Luo Kailuo	Porsche 911 (992 I) GT3 Cup	2023 Buriram Porsche Carrera Cup Asia round
World SSP	1:37.620	Randy Krummenacher	Yamaha YZF-R6	2018 Buriram World SSP round
Formula Renault 2.0	1:38.515	Ye Hongli	Tatuus FR2.0/13	2016 Buriram Asian Formula Renault round
Formula 4	1:39.245	Alex Sawer	Tatuus F4-T421	2025 Buriram F4 SEA round
TC1	1:39.275	Gabriele Tarquini	Honda Civic WTCC	2015 FIA WTCC Race of Thailand
Formula Abarth	1:39.473	Philip Hamprecht	Tatuus FA010	2016 Buriram Formula Masters China round
Moto3	1:41.042	David Muñoz	KTM RC250GP	2025 Thailand motorcycle Grand Prix
TCR Touring Car	1:44.121	Gianni Morbidelli	Honda Civic Type R TCR (FK2)	2015 Buriram TCR International Series round
GT4	1:44.825	Reinhold Renger	Mercedes-AMG GT4	2018 Buriram Blancpain GT Series Asia round
Asia Productions 250	1:50.726	Veda Ega Pratama	Honda CBR250RR	2023 1st Buriram ARRC round
Clio Cup	1:58.608	Kenneth Lim	Renault Clio R.S. IV	2016 Buriram Clio Cup China round
Asia Underbone 150	2:00.392	Fahmi Basam	Yamaha MX King 150	2025 1st Buriram ARRC round

== Fatalities ==
Asia Road Racing Championship Underbone 150 class rider Amber Garcia Torres died after a crash with a Yamaha Jupiter MX King with UMA Racing Yamaha Philippines on the third lap while fighting for race leader on December 5, 2019.

== Gallery ==
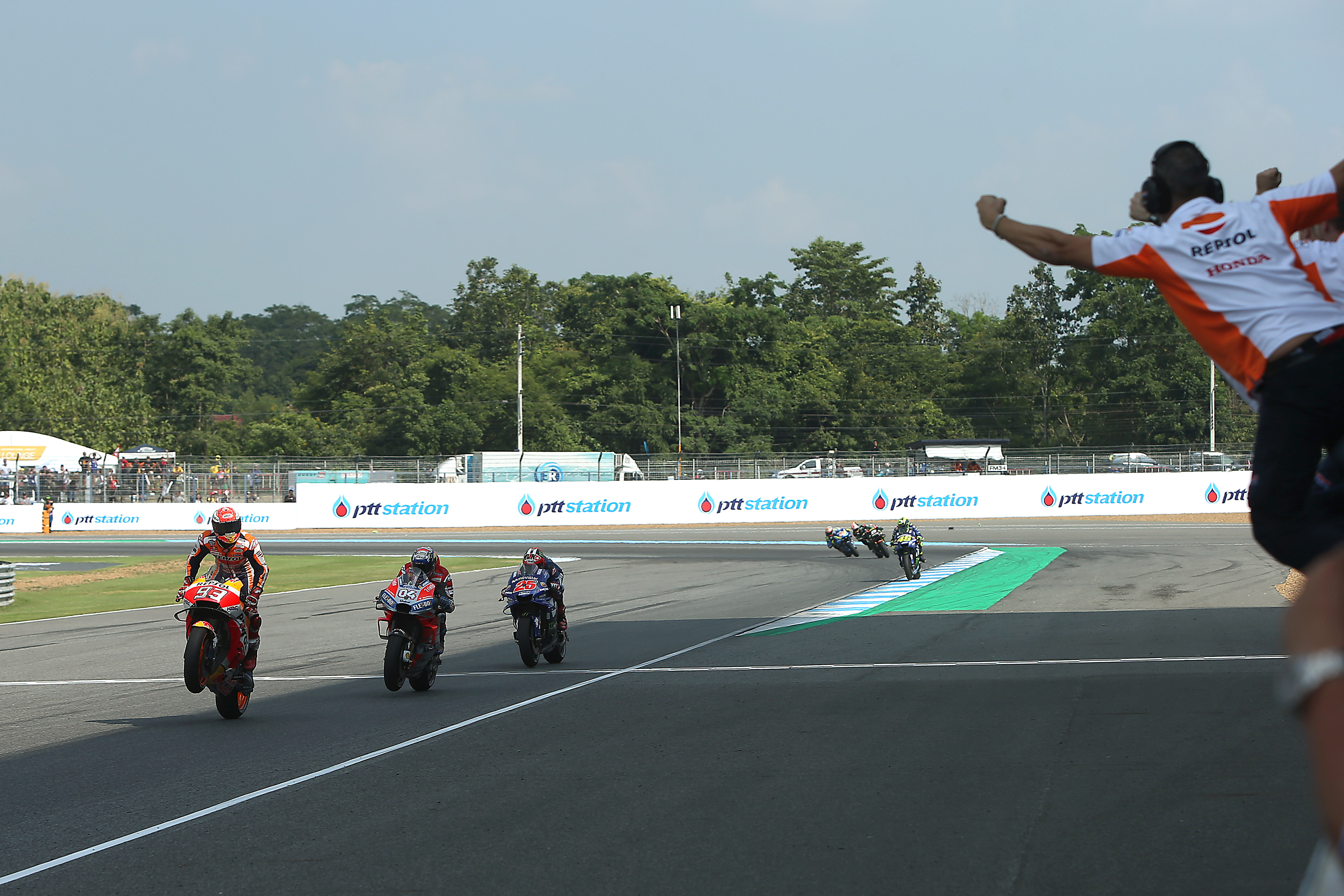
Finish line of the Circuit

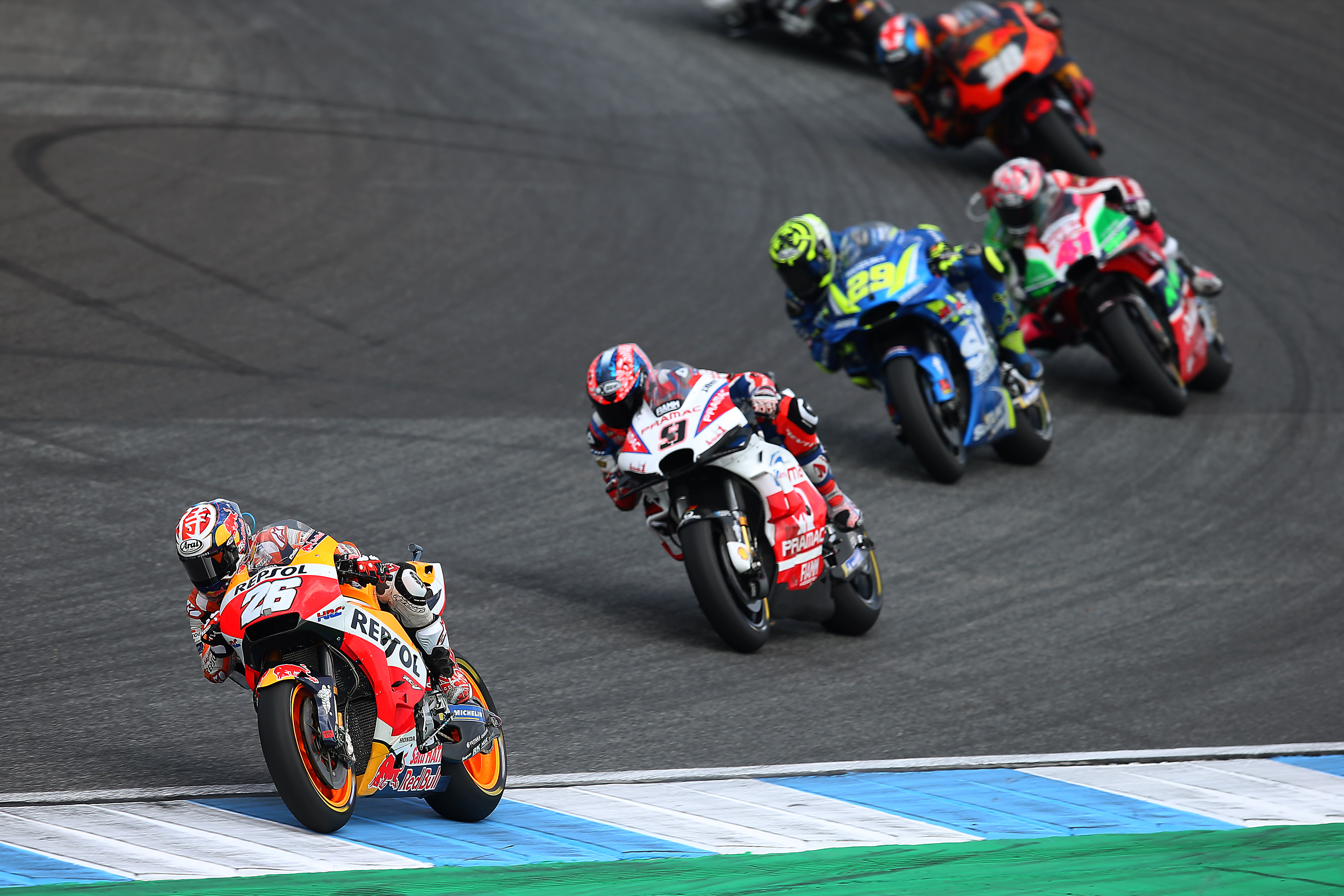
S-curve at the Circuit

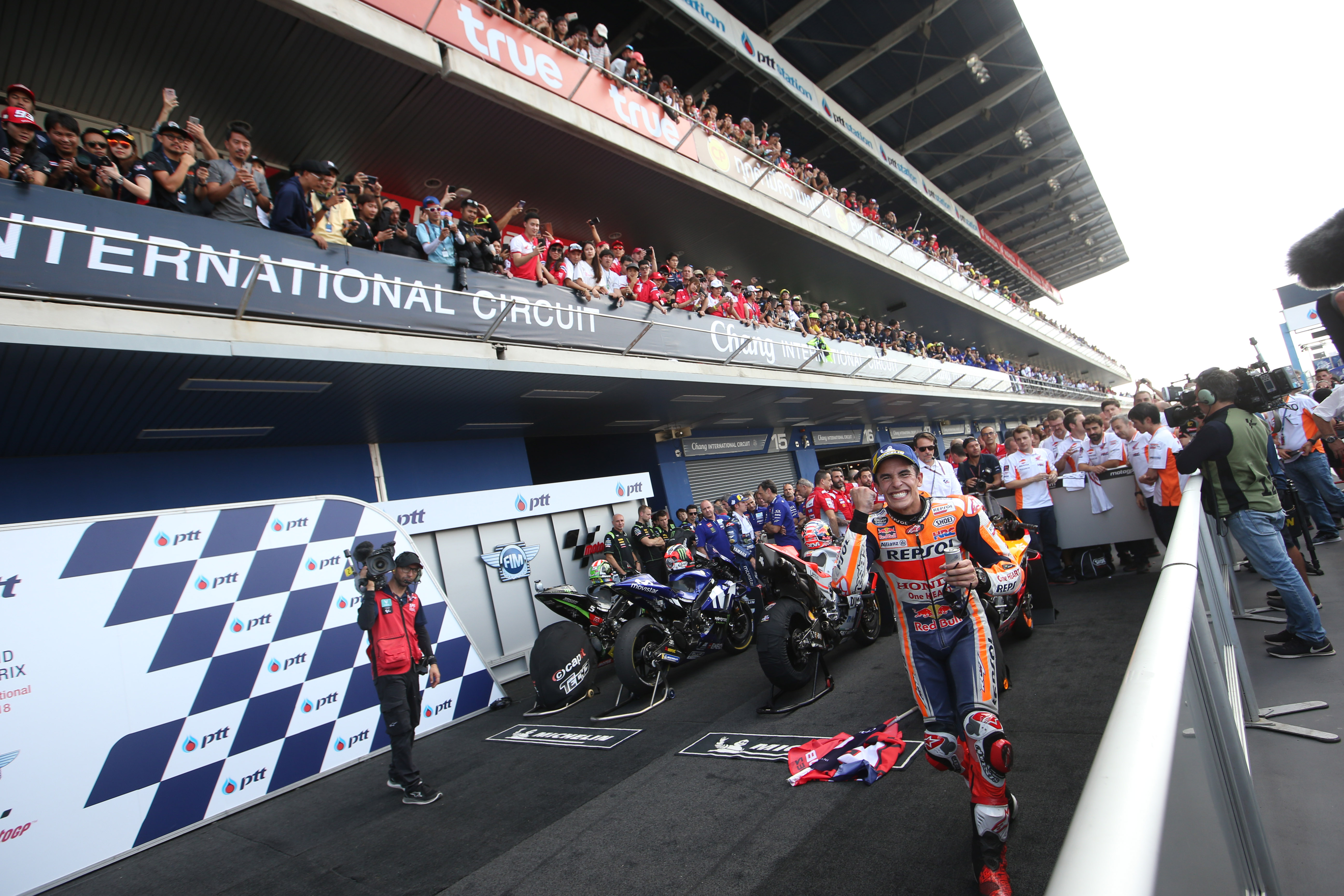
Marc Márquez after winning the 2018 Thailand motorcycle Grand Prix at Buriram International Circuit

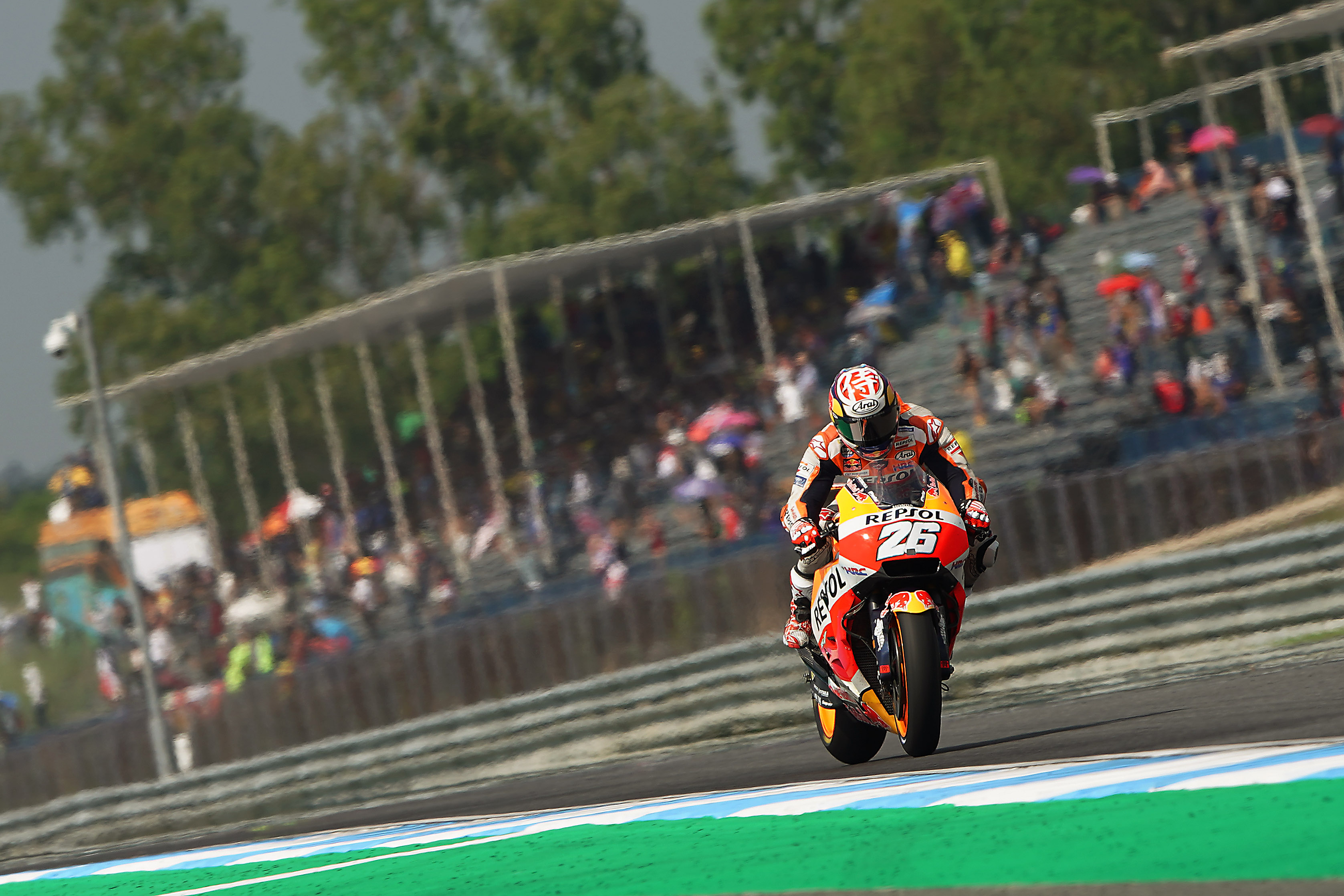
Dani Pedrosa riding his Repsol Honda in the 2018 Thailand motorcycle Grand Prix at Buriram International Circuit

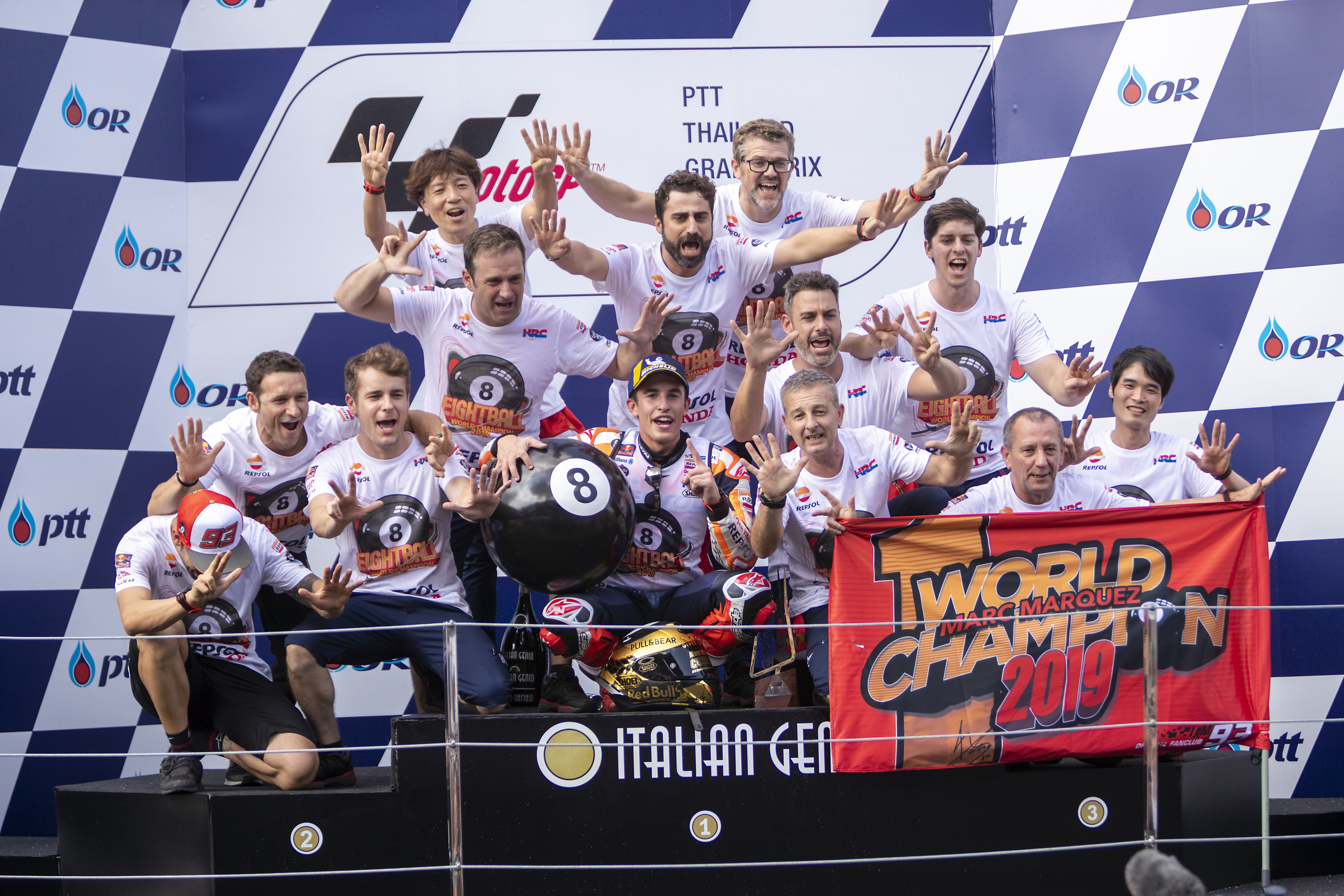
Marc Márquez, celebrating with his team on the podium after winning his sixth MotoGP world championship title and the 2019 Thailand motorcycle Grand Prix
