= Thomas Laurent =

French racing driver (born 1998)

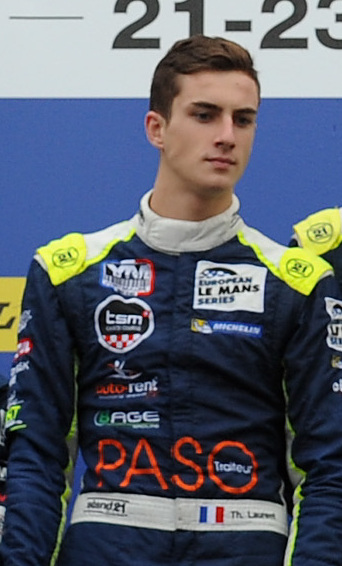
- Laurent in 2016
- Nationality: (France) French
- Born: Thomas Christophe Pierre-François Laurent; 5 April 1998 (age 28) La Roche-sur-Yon, France

European Le Mans Series career
- Debut season: 2016
- Current team: DKR Engineering
- Categorisation: FIA Bronze (2015–2016); FIA Silver (2017); FIA Gold (2018–)
- Car number: 3
- Former teams: M.Racing - YMR, Graff Racing, Mühlner Motorsport
- Starts: 22 (22 entries)
- Wins: 1
- Podiums: 4
- Poles: 0
- Fastest laps: 0
- Best finish: 6th in 2020 (LMP2)

Previous series
- 2015–18 2016 2016: Asian Le Mans Series; European Le Mans Series; Porsche Carrera Cup France

Championship titles
- 2017–18: Asian Le Mans Series

Thomas Christophe Pierre-François Laurent (born 5 April 1998) is a French racing driver who currently competes in the 2025 European Le Mans Series with DKR Engineering. He previously competed in the FIA World Endurance Championship for French team Signatech Alpine Matmut and in the European Le Mans Series with Graff Racing. He finished second in the 2017 24 Hours of Le Mans and third in the 2018 24 Hours of Le Mans.

== Career ==
=== Early life ===
Born in La Roche-sur-Yon to go-kart racing mechanic Jean-Pascal Laurent and his wife Nathalie Laurent, he began karting at age three in a small custom-built go kart on an adapted circuit constructed by his father and began competing competitively from the age of seven. He aimed to be in endurance racing from the age of either 11 or 12 and was an enthusiast of the 24 Hours of Le Mans. Laurent finished ninth at the 2012 World Karting Championship held in Portimão, Portugal. He won the French Karting Championship every year from 2012 to 2014 and the World Karting Championship in 2015.

=== 2015 ===
Laurent stepped out of karting aged 17 in late 2015 and had twice tested a Formula 4 car but he was unhappy with the amount of money he required to progress to the category. He competed in three of the four rounds 2015–16 Asian Le Mans Series with Jackie Chan DC Racing alongside Ho-Pin Tung and David Cheng. They won all three races, but Laurent was only ranked second in the championship as Tung and Cheng won the opening round without him, leaving Laurent with a 25-point deficit.

=== 2016 ===
Laurent raced in the 2016 European Le Mans Championship in LMP3 for YMR in a Ligier JS P3 alongside Alexandre Cougnaud and Yann Ehrlacher. He finished 8th in the championship despite three retirements, and took a dominant win in the final round at Estoril. He also entered the Road To Le Mans race that year for DC Racing, alongside Cougnaud. Laurent took over the car in the lead and pulled away to win the race.

Laurent returned to the Asian Le Mans Series for the 2016–17 season. He raced in LMP2, again for DC Racing alongside Tung and Gustavo Menezes. He missed the first round (which Tung and Menezes won in his absence) before they came second and first at Fuji and Buriram respectively. This left the No. 35 car with an 18-point lead coming into the final round. However they retired after a first corner accident, and lost the title. Laurent placed seventh in the drivers title.

=== 2017 ===
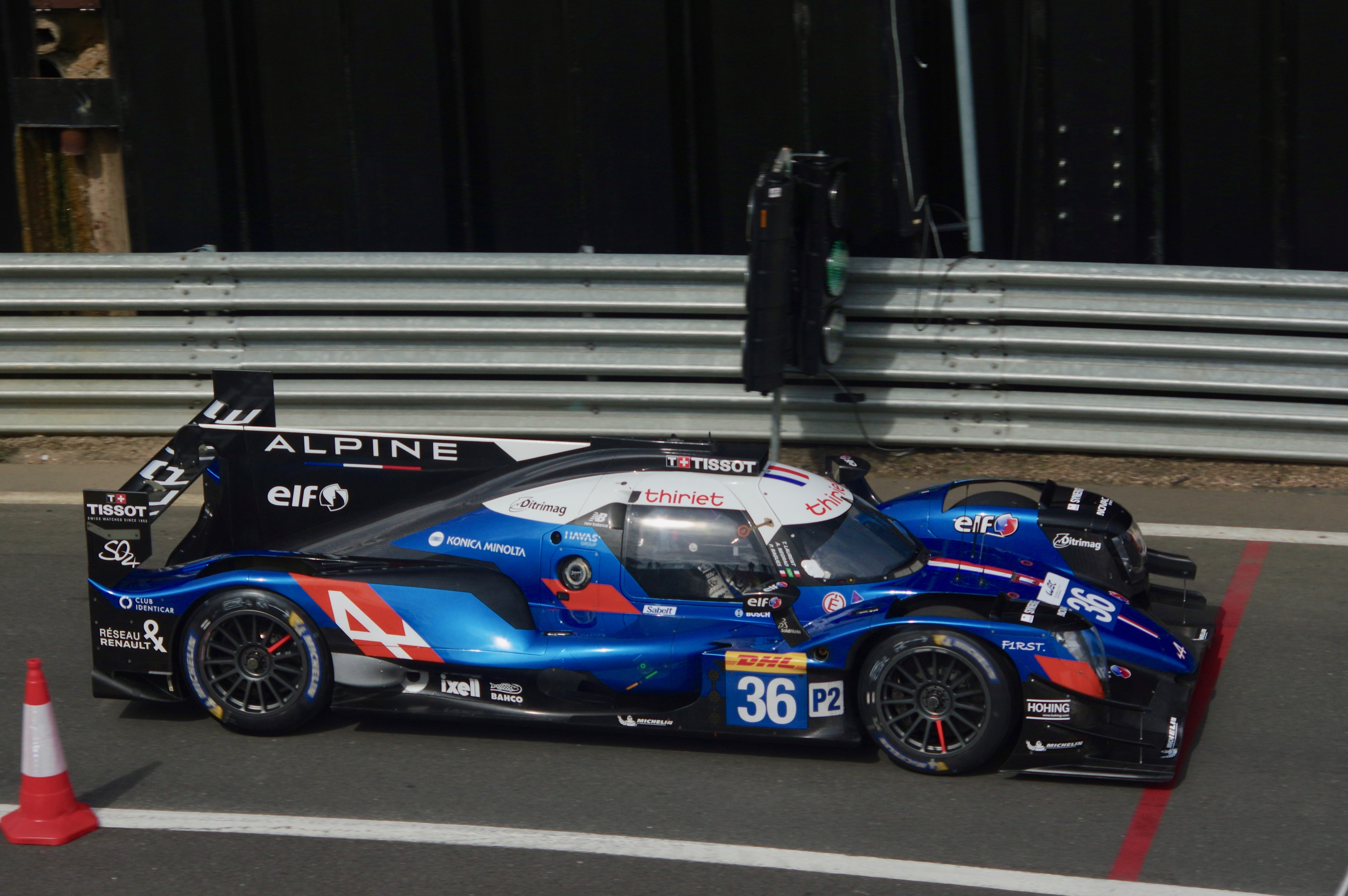
Laurent's Signatech Alpine Elf LMP2 car at the 2019 4 Hours of Silverstone

In 2017 it was announced that Laurent would race in the World Endurance Championship in the LMP2 class. He drove for Jackie Chan DC Racing in a Jota Sport run Oreca 07 alongside Tung and Oliver Jarvis.

After winning on his debut at Silverstone and finishing third at Spa, Laurent had an impressive run at Le Mans. After helping his team get into the LMP2 lead, Laurent inherited the overall lead due to problems with LMP1 cars. In the end, he won Le Mans in the LMP2 class, finishing second on the overall podium. He added to his win count with a dominant victory at the Nurburgring, but then finished ninth in class in Mexico due to a clutch issue. More successful races followed at the Circuit Of The Americas and Fuji with fourth and third-placed finishes respectively.

It was announced that Laurent was awarded an opportunity to drive a Toyota LMP1 car in the Bahrain post-season test.

=== 2018 ===
Laurent had a contract dispute with DC Racing, because he signed with Rebellion Racing. Despite this, he with Harrison Newey and Stéphane Richelmi took the 2017–18 Asian Le Mans Series title in the LMP2 category. He got a green light to race for Rebellion in 2018–19 FIA World Endurance Championship, competing behind the wheel of Rebellion R13 car with Mathias Beche and Gustavo Menezes. He finished his first LMP1 race on podium behind two hybrid Toyotas. He joined the Signatech Alpine team the following season, finishing eighth in the standings with two podiums. In November 2018, Laurent tested a Dallara F2 2018 car for Arden International at the FIA Formula 2 Championship post-season rookie test session at the Yas Marina Circuit.

== Racing record ==
=== Career summary ===
Season	Series	Team	Races	Wins	Poles	F/Laps	Podiums	Points	Position
2015–16	Asian Le Mans Series - LMP3	DC Racing	3	3	2	1	3	77	2nd
2016	Porsche Carrera Cup France	Martinet by Alméras	12	0	0	0	1	93	6th
2016	Porsche Supercup	Martinet by Alméras	1	0	0	0	0	7	19th
2016	European Le Mans Series - LMP3	M.Racing - YMR	6	1	0	0	1	36	8th
2016	Road to Le Mans - LMP3	DC Racing	1	1	0	0	1	N/A	1st
2016–17	Asian Le Mans Series - LMP2	Jackie Chan DC Racing	3	1	1	0	2	44	7th
2017	FIA World Endurance Championship - LMP2	Jackie Chan DC Racing	9	3	1	0	6	175	2nd
2017	24 Hours of Le Mans - LMP2	Jackie Chan DC Racing	1	1	0	0	1	N/A	1st
2017–18	Asian Le Mans Series - LMP2	Jackie Chan DC Racing X Jota	4	3	2	1	4	95	1st
2018	French GT4 Cup - Pro-Am	M.Racing - YMR	4	0	0	0	1	25	17th
2018	24 Hours of Le Mans	Rebellion Racing	1	0	0	0	1	N/A	3rd
2018–19	FIA World Endurance Championship	Rebellion Racing	8	1	0	0	4	114	3rd
2019	24 Hours of Le Mans	Rebellion Racing	1	0	0	0	0	N/A	5th
2019–20	FIA World Endurance Championship - LMP2	Signatech Alpine Elf	8	0	0	0	2	109	8th
2019–20	FIA World Endurance Championship - LMP1	Toyota Gazoo Racing	Reserve driver						
2020	European Le Mans Series - LMP2	Graff	5	0	0	0	2	43	6th
2020	Alpine Elf Europa Cup	Racing Technology	1	0	0	0	0	0	NC†
2020	24 Hours of Le Mans - LMP2	Signatech Alpine Elf	1	0	0	0	0	N/A	4th
2021	24 Hours of Le Mans - LMP2	IDEC Sport	0	0	0	0	0	N/A	WD
2022	European Le Mans Series - LMP2	Mühlner Motorsport	6	0	0	0	1	19	15th
2023	GT World Challenge Europe Endurance Cup	Boutsen VDS	1	0	0	0	0	0	NC
2023	Lamborghini Super Trofeo Europe - Pro	Boutsen VDS	4	0	0	0	0	10.5	11th
2023	24 Hours of Le Mans - Hypercar	Glickenhaus Racing	Reserve driver						
2024	French GT4 Cup - Pro-Am	AV Racing	12	2	0	0	6	153	3rd
2024	Ultimate Cup Series - Proto NP02	Cogemo Racing Team	1	0	0	0	0	8	33rd
2025	European Le Mans Series - LMP2 Pro-Am	DKR Engineering	4	0	0	0	0	32	11th
2025	Le Mans Cup - LMP3	DKR Engineering							
2026	Italian GT Championship Endurance Cup - GT3	Audi Sport Italia	1	0	0	0	0	0	NC†

^{†} As Laurent was a guest driver, he was ineligible to score points. ^{*} Season still in progress.

=== Complete European Le Mans Series results ===
Year	Team	Class	Car	Engine	1	2	3	4	5	6	Rank	Points
2016	M.Racing - YMR	LMP3	Ligier JS P3	Nissan VK50VE 5.0 L V8	SIL; Ret	IMO; 5	RBR; 10	LEC; Ret	SPA; Ret	EST; 1	8th	36
2020	Graff	LMP2	Oreca 07	Gibson GK428 4.2 L V8	LEC; 9	SPA; 2	LEC; 3	MNZ; 9	ALG; 7		6th	43
2022	Mühlner Motorsport	LMP2	Oreca 07	Gibson GK428 4.2 L V8	LEC; 9	IMO; 11	MNZ; 3	CAT; 9	SPA; Ret	ALG; Ret	15th	19
2025	DKR Engineering	LMP2 Pro-Am	Oreca 07	Gibson GK428 4.2 L V8	CAT; 6	LEC; 7	IMO; 7	SPA; 7	SIL	ALG	11th	32

=== Complete FIA World Endurance Championship results ===
Year	Entrant	Class	Chassis	Engine	1	2	3	4	5	6	7	8	9	Rank	Points
2017	Jackie Chan DC Racing	LMP2	Oreca 07	Gibson GK428 4.2 L V8	SIL; 1	SPA; 3	LMS; 1	NÜR; 1	MEX; 9	COA; 4	FUJ; 3	SHA; 4	BHR; 2	2nd	175
2018–19	Rebellion Racing	LMP1	Rebellion R13	Gibson GL458 4.5 L V8	SPA; 3	LMS; 3	SIL; 1	FUJ; Ret	SHA; 5	SEB; 7	SPA; 2	LMS; 5		3rd	114
2019–20	Signatech Alpine Elf	LMP2	Alpine A470	Gibson GK428 4.2 L V8	SIL; 2	FUJ; 6	SHA; 4	BHR; 4	COA; 6	SPA; Ret	LMS; 3	BHR; 5		8th	109

=== Complete 24 Hours of Le Mans results ===
Year	Team	Co-Drivers	Car	Class	Laps	Pos.	Class Pos.
2017	(China) Jackie Chan DC Racing	(China) Ho-Pin Tung (United Kingdom) Oliver Jarvis	Oreca 07-Gibson	LMP2	366	2nd	1st
2018	(Switzerland) Rebellion Racing	(Switzerland) Mathias Beche (United States) Gustavo Menezes	Rebellion R13-Gibson	LMP1	376	3rd	3rd
2019	(Switzerland) Rebellion Racing	(France) Nathanaël Berthon (United States) Gustavo Menezes	Rebellion R13-Gibson	LMP1	370	5th	5th
2020	(France) Signatech Alpine Elf	(Brazil) André Negrão (France) Pierre Ragues	Alpine A470-Gibson	LMP2	367	8th	4th
2021	(France) IDEC Sport	(United Kingdom) Ryan Dalziel (United States) Dwight Merriman	Oreca 07-Gibson	LMP2; Pro-Am	0	WD	WD

Sporting positions
Preceded by Andrea Roda	Asian Le Mans Series; LMP2 Champion; 2017–18; With: Harrison Newey & Stéphane Richelmi	Succeeded by Paul di Resta; Phil Hanson
