= Douglas Khoo =

Malaysian racing driver (born 1965)

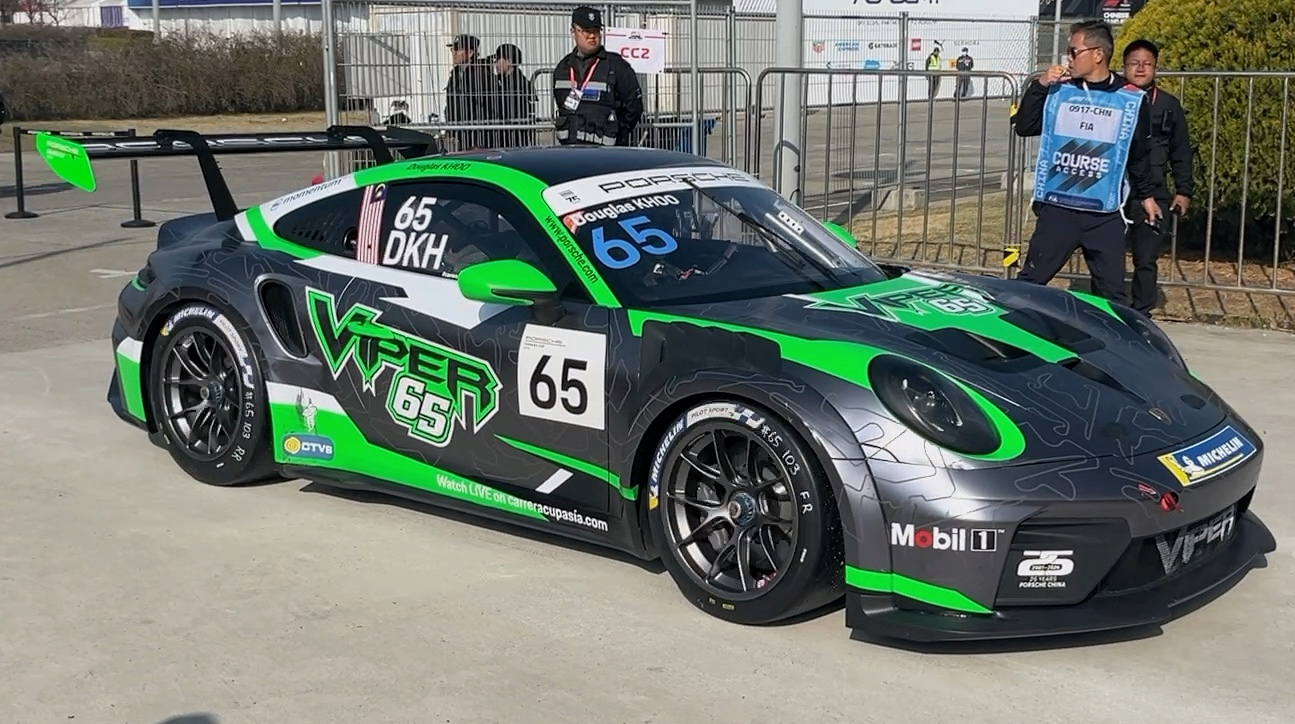
- Khoo in the 2026 Porsche Carrera Cup Asia
- Nationality: Malaysian
- Born: Douglas Khoo Kok Hui; 21 May 1965 (age 61) Kuala Lumpur, Malaysia

TCR Asia Series career
- Debut season: 2015
- Current team: Viper Niza Racing
- Categorisation: FIA Bronze
- Car number: 65
- Starts: 8

Previous series
- 2014: Asia Classic Car Challenge

Douglas Khoo Kok Hui (born 21 May 1965 in Kuala Lumpur) is a Malaysian entrepreneur, amateur racing driver and team owner who last competed in Porsche Carrera Cup Asia for his own team, Viper Niza Racing. He had previously competed in the Asia Classic Car Challenge.

== Racing career ==
Khoo began his career in 2014 in the Asia Classic Car Challenge, he finished second in the championship standings that year.

In October 2015, it was announced that Khoo would race in the TCR Asia Series & TCR International Series, driving a SEAT León Cup Racer for Viper Niza Racing.

2016 saw Khoo finish the year 1st Runner Up in the Amateur Driver's Championship and seventh in the Overall Driver's Championship.

Khoo participated in the 2016 Sepang 12 Hours race and was Champion in the Touring Car Category.

== Racing record ==
=== Complete TCR International Series results ===
(key) (Races in bold indicate pole position) (Races in italics indicate fastest lap)

Year	Team	Car	1	2	3	4	5	6	7	8	9	10	11	12	13	14	15	16	17	18	19	20	21	22	DC	Points
2015	Niza Racing	SEAT León Cup Racer	MYS; 1	MYS; 2	CHN; 1	CHN; 2	ESP; 1	ESP; 2	POR; 1	POR; 2	ITA; 1	ITA; 2	AUT; 1	AUT; 2	RUS; 1	RUS; 2	RBR; 1	RBR; 2	SIN; 1	SIN; 2	THA; 1; 19	THA; 2; 17	MAC; 1 DNQ	MAC; 2 DNQ	NC	0
2016	Viper Niza Racing	SEAT León TCR	BHR; 1	BHR; 2	POR; 1	POR; 2	BEL; 1	BEL; 2	ITA; 1	ITA; 2	AUT; 1	AUT; 2	GER; 1	GER; 2	RUS; 1	RUS; 2	THA; 1	THA; 2	SIN; 1 Ret	SIN; 2; 15	MYS; 1; 15	MYS; 2; 17	MAC; 1 DNQ	MAC; 2 DNQ	NC	0
2017	Viper Niza Racing	SEAT León TCR	GEO; 1	GEO; 2	BHR; 1	BHR; 2	BEL; 1	BEL; 2	ITA; 1	ITA; 2	AUT; 1	AUT; 2	HUN; 1	HUN; 2	GER; 1	GER; 2	THA; 1; 20	THA; 2; 21	CHN; 1	CHN; 2	ABU; 1	ABU; 2			NC*	0*

^{†} Driver did not finish the race, but was classified as he completed over 90% of the race distance.
^{*} Season still in progress.

=== TCR Spa 500 results ===
Year	Team	Co-Drivers	Car	Class	Laps	Pos.	Class Pos.
2019	(Malaysia) Viper Niza Racing	(Malaysia) Dominic Ang (Malaysia) Fariqe Hairuman (Malaysia) Melvin Moh	CUPRA León TCR	**PA**	441	4th	**1st**
