= Josh Burdon =

Australian racing driver (born 1992)

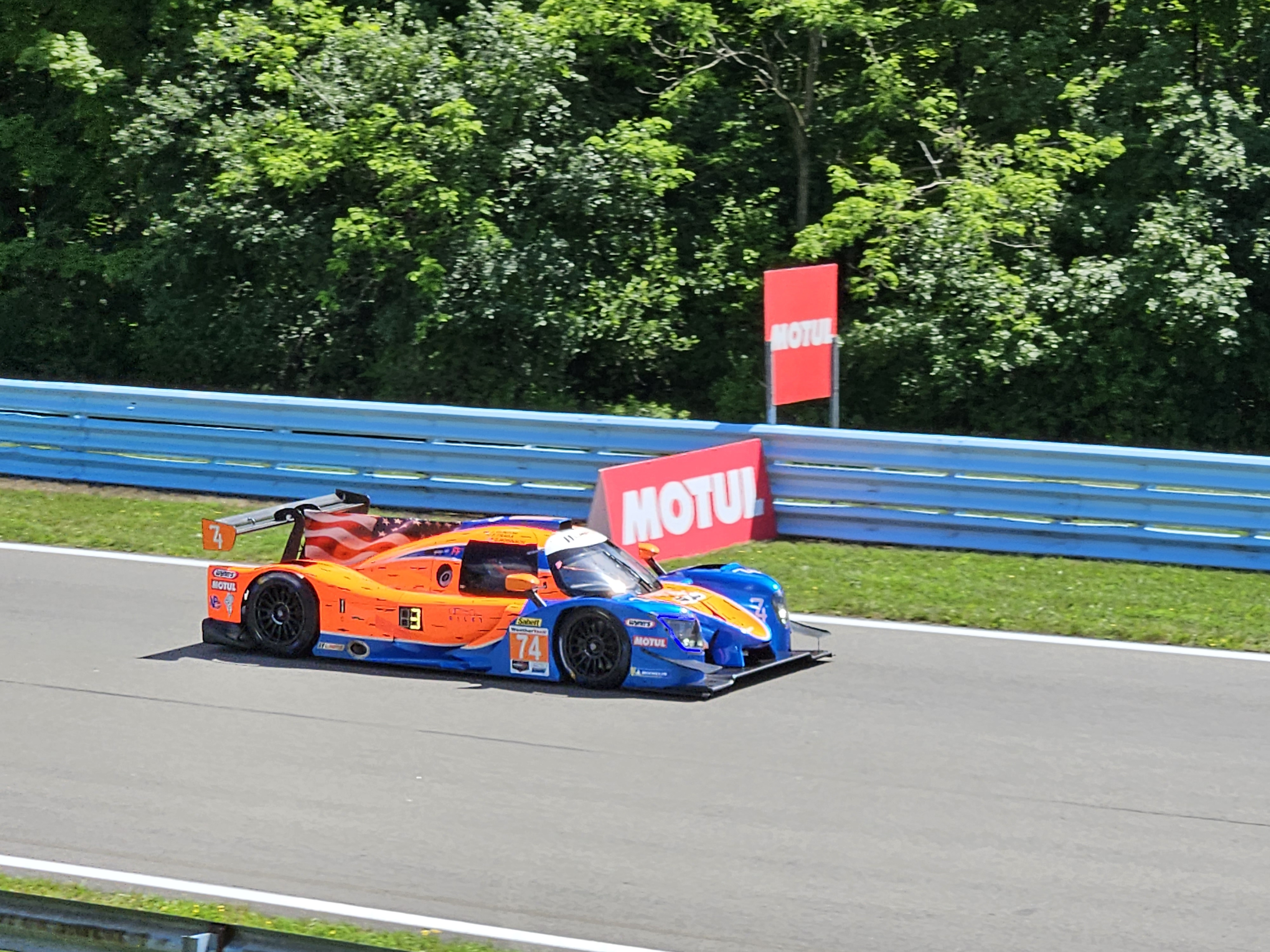
- Burdon in 2023
- Nationality: (Australia) Australian
- Born: 5 September 1992 (age 34) Hobart, Tasmania, Australia

IMSA SportsCar Championship career
- Debut season: 2021
- Current team: Riley Motorsports
- Car number: 74
- Former teams: Andretti Autosport
- Starts: 22
- Wins: 4
- Podiums: 11

Josh Burdon (born September 5, 1992) is an Australian racing driver. He currently drives the No. 74 Oreca LMP2 for Riley Motorsports in the IMSA WeatherTech SportsCar Championship. Previously, Burdon competed for Hong Kong–based KC Motorgroup in the Intercontinental GT Challenge, Nürburgring Langstrecken Serie and GT World Challenge Europe.

== Career ==
As a third generation racer, Burdon began his racing career kart racing at eight years old winning various titles. At the age of sixteen, he was awarded with a funded scholarship through the Confederation of Australian Motorsport to make the transition into racing cars. He further progressed to competing internationally in 2012, and has gone on to compete in numerous racing series throughout the world.

In 2013, Burdon relocated to France and signed with Scorpus Racing driving the Xbox sponsored car in the open Whelen Euro Series. He led the championship from beginning to end, winning sevem out of twelve races when he was controversially taken out during the final race in Le Mans. As a result, he finished second in the championship. During the season he joined the final two rounds of French Formula Premium, winning both rounds in Circuit du Val de Vienne and Le Mans. Funding ruled Burdon out of a full time seat for most of the 2014–15 seasons.

2016 saw Burdon relocated to China to spearhead BlackArts Racing Team season in the Asian Formula Renault Series. He won the championship with seven out of twelve race wins. Burdon competed in the 2017–18 Asian Le Mans Series in LMP3 with KC Motorgroup, joining him was Neric Wei and Louis Prette. Burdon swept qualifying after winning four pole positions from four attempts at Zhuhai International Circuit, Fuji Speedway, Chang International Circuit and Sepang International Circuit. Burdon, Wei and Prette won in Zhuhai, Thailand and were leading the final race in Sepang when an exhaust broke and took them out of contention for the win. They ended second in the championship.

In 2018, Burdon was signed by Taiwanese celebrity Jimmy Lin to compete for his team PTRS in the China LMP3 Series. Burdon won the championship after dominating the final round in Tianjin, despite a publicly difficult relationship with the team as the season progressed. He also competed in the first rounds of GT World Challenge Asia with Absolute Racing, partnering with Anthony Liu driving an Audi R8 LMS GT3 as a Pro Am lineup, Burdon picked up pole position on his GT3 debut in Sepang International Circuit, Malaysia.

During pre season in 2019, KC Motorgroup announced Burdon joining its expanding international GT3 program, where they fielded the official GT3 entries for Nissan with the Nissan GT-R GT3. He was placed into the No. 35 where he joined factory Japanese Nissan drivers Tsugio Matsuda and Katsumasa Chiyo. They competed in the Intercontinental GT Challenge and the Nürburgring Langstrecken Serie. The season kicked off with the 2019 Bathurst 12 Hour, where Burdon picked up fastest lap of the race after mechanical issue took them out of the fight for the win while battling inside the top-five at mid race distance. Burdon escaped serious injury in scary crash during the 2019 24 Hours of Nürburgring after slowing for a code 60 zone on the Dottinger Hohe a lower category car was not paying attention and hit Burdon from behind with a significant impact.

== Personal life ==
Burdon was born in Hobart, the capital city of Tasmania. He was educated at St Virgils College, a Catholic boys school that puts much importance on sport. Graduated high school and did not complete further studies after turning full focus towards being a racing driver.

== Racing Record ==
=== Complete WeatherTech SportsCar Championship results ===
(key) (Races in bold indicate pole position; races in italics indicate fastest lap)

Year	Entrant	No.	Class	Make	Engine	1	2	3	4	5	6	7	Rank	Points	Ref
2021	Andretti Autosport	36	LMP3	Ligier JS P320	Nissan VK56DE 5.6 L V8	DAY	SEB	MDO	WGL	WGL	ELK	PET; 10	33rd	240	
2022	Andretti Autosport	36	LMP3	Ligier JS P320	Nissan VK56DE 5.6 L V8	**DAY**; 4	SEB; 10	MDO	WGL; 11	CTM	ELK	PET; 1	18th	822	
2023	Riley Motorsports	74	LMP3	Ligier JS P320	Nissan VK56DE 5.6 L V8	DAY; 9	SEB; 1	**WGL**; 1	MOS	ELK; 1	IMS; 2	PET; 3	5th	1777	
2024	Riley Motorsports	74	LMP2	Oreca 07	Gibson GK428 4.2 L V8	DAY; 3	SEB; 5	WGL; 2	MOS	ELK	IMS; 5	ATL; 2	16th	1587	
2025	Riley Motorsports	74	LMP2	Oreca 07	Gibson GK428 4.2 L V8	DAY; 2	SEB; 4	**WGL**; 5	MOS	ELK	IMS; 3	ATL; 8	20th	1505	
2026	JDC–Miller MotorSports	79	LMP2	Oreca 07	Gibson GK428 4.2 L V8	DAY	SEB; DNS	WGL	MOS	ELK; 8	IMS	ATL	32th*	268*	
