= Konstantīns Calko =

Latvian racing driver

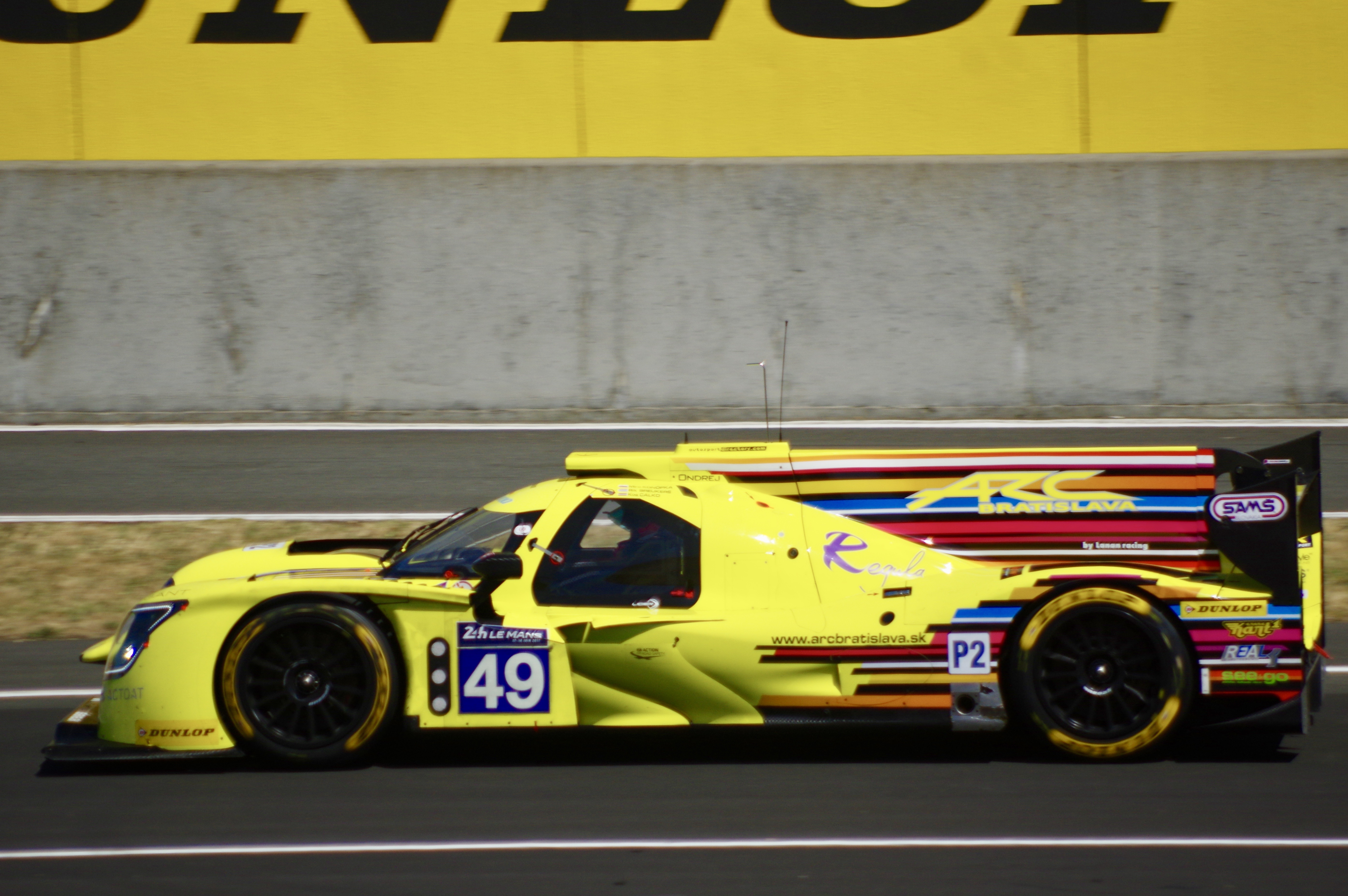
- Calko in 2017.
- Nationality: Latvian
- Born: 13 April 1994 (age 32) Daugavpils, Latvia

Asian Le Mans Series career
- Debut season: 2017
- Current team: ARC Bratislava
- Categorisation: FIA Silver
- Car number: 4
- Starts: 4
- Best finish: 3
- Finished last season: 3

Previous series
- 2013 2012–14 2011 2001–12: WEC WTCC; Radical European Masters; Baltic Touring Car Championship; Karting

Championship titles
- 2012 2010, 12: Radical European Masters; Karting

Konstantīns Calko (born 13 April 1994) is a Latvian auto racing driver. He is the first Latvian racing driver to compete in the 24 Hours of Le Mans.

== Racing career ==
Clako began his career in 2001 in karting. Since then he became numerous Latvian champion in various karting categories. In 2011 he switched to the Baltic Touring Car Championship. The next year, Calko raced in Radical European Masters and secured Champion title in Supersports category as well took World Vice-Champion title in DD2 category in Rotax Grand Finals held in Portimao In 2013, Calko made his World Touring Car Championship debut with Campos Racing driving a SEAT León WTCC in the last round in Macau.

In February 2015, it was announced that Calko would make his European Le Mans Series debut with SVK by Speed Factory driving a Ginetta LMP3. He finished season on third.

In 2017, Calko fulfilled his life dream and competed in 2017 24 Hours of Le Mans race with ARC Bratislava, although technical failures with the car prevented to reach high results. After few months later in Asian Le Mans Series 2017/2018 season, together with the same team, Calko finished third in championship.

In 2018, Calko, together with Red Camel Jordans team, won the Creventic 24H Silverstone both overall and in the TCE class.

== Racing record ==
=== Complete World Touring Car Championship results ===
(key) (Races in bold indicate pole position – 1 point awarded just in first race; races in italics indicate fastest lap – 1 point awarded all races; * signifies that driver led race for at least one lap – 1 point given all races)

Year	Team	Car	1	2	3	4	5	6	7	8	9	10	11	12	13	14	15	16	17	18	19	20	21	22	23	24	DC	Pts
2013	Campos Racing	SEAT León WTCC	ITA; 1	ITA; 2	MAR; 1	MAR; 2	SVK; 1	SVK; 2	HUN; 1	HUN; 2	AUT; 1	AUT; 2	RUS; 1	RUS; 2	POR; 1	POR; 2	ARG; 1	ARG; 2	USA; 1	USA; 2	JPN; 1	JPN; 2	CHN; 1	CHN; 2	MAC; 1; 29†	MAC; 2 Ret	NC	0

^{†} Driver did not finish the race, but was classified as he completed over 90% of the race distance.

=== 24 Hours of Le Mans results ===
Year	Team	Co-Drivers	Car	Class	Laps	Pos.	Class Pos.
2017	(Slovakia) ARC Bratislava	(Slovakia) Miro Konôpka (Netherlands) Rik Breukers	Ligier JS P217-Gibson	LMP2	314	45th	19th
