= Viper Niza Racing =

(Malaysia) Viper Niza Racing
- Founded: 2009
- Team principal(s): Douglas Khoo
- Current series: TCR Asia Series; Asian Le Mans Series; 24H Series
- Former series: TCR Thailand Series
- Noted drivers: TCR Asia; 1. (South Korea) Roelof Bruins; 65. (Malaysia) Douglas Khoo

Viper Niza Racing, formerly Niza Racing, is a Malaysian auto racing team based in Shah Alam, Selangor, Malaysia. The team currently competes in the TCR Asia Series and Asian Le Mans Series.

== TCR Asia Series ==
=== SEAT León Cup Racer (2015–) ===
The team will enter the 2015 TCR Asia Series season with Douglas Khoo driving a SEAT León Cup Racer.

== Asian Le Mans Series ==
Viper Niza Racing entered the LMP3 category of the Asian Le Mans Series with its Ligier JS P3 contender.

=== 4 Hours of Sepang (2020) ===
In the 4 Hours of Sepang 2020, Viper Niza Racing qualified in 15th place overall, 6th in its class out of 8 entrants. During the race, a mechanical problem with its prototype in the 2nd hour resulted in the vehicle being called back to the pits. As a result, it managed to finish in 19th place overall out of 23 entrants and last in its class.
