= Philippe Descombes =

French racing driver

- Nationality: French
- Born: 22 November 1974 (age 51) Paris, France

TCR Asia Series career
- Debut season: 2015
- Current team: Asia Racing Team
- Categorisation: FIA Bronze (until 2019, 2027–); FIA Silver (2020–2026)
- Car number: 14
- Starts: 3
- Wins: 2
- Poles: 1
- Fastest laps: 2

Previous series
- 2012 2002 2001 2000 1999-00 1996-97: Porsche Carrera Cup Asia; Formula 3 Asia; Macau Asian Formula 2000; Ericsson Formula Challenge; Formula 2000 Asia; Championnat de France Formule Renault

Championship titles
- 2001 2000: Macau Asian Formula 2000; Ericsson Formula Challenge

Philippe Descombes (born 22 November 1974) is a French racing driver currently competing in the TCR Asia Series. He has previously competed in the Porsche Carrera Cup Asia, Formula 3 Asia and Formula 2000 Asia amongst others.

== Racing career ==
Descombes began his career in 1996 in the Championnat de France Formule Renault, he finished 13th in the standings in 1997. In 1999, he switched to the Formula 2000 Asia series. He switched to the Ericsson Formula Challenge in 2000, winning the title that year. In 2001, he raced in the Macau Asian Formula 2000 Challenge also winning the title the same year. He raced in the Formula 3 Asia in 2002 and in the Porsche Carrera Cup Asia in 2012.

In September 2015, it was announced that Descombes would race in the first ever TCR Asia Series round in Sepang, driving a SEAT León Cup Racer for Asia Racing Team.
