= 2016 Blancpain GT Series =

2016 sports car racing series

The 2016 Blancpain GT Series was the third season of the Blancpain GT Series. The season started on 10 April in Misano and ended on 2 October in Barcelona. The season featured ten rounds, five Endurance Cup rounds and five Sprint Cup rounds.

== Calendar ==
On 18 September 2015, the Stéphane Ratel Organisation announced the 2016 calendar.

Event	Circuit	Date	Series	Report
1	Misano World Circuit Marco Simoncelli, Misano Adriatico, Italy	10 April	Sprint	Report
2	Autodromo Nazionale Monza, Monza, Italy	24 April	Endurance	Report
3	(United Kingdom) Brands Hatch, Kent, Great Britain	8 May	Sprint	Report
4	(United Kingdom) Silverstone Circuit, Silverstone, Great Britain	15 May	Endurance	Report
5	Circuit Paul Ricard, Le Castellet, France	25 June	Endurance	Report
6	Nürburgring, Nürburg, Germany	3 July	Sprint	Report
7	Circuit de Spa-Francorchamps, Spa, Belgium	30–31 July	Endurance	Report
8	Hungaroring, Mogyoród, Hungary	28 August	Sprint	Report
9	Nürburgring, Nürburg, Germany	18 September	Endurance	Report
10	Circuit de Barcelona-Catalunya, Montmeló, Spain	2 October	Sprint	Report

== Race results ==
Bold indicates overall winner.

Event		Circuit	Pole position	Pro Winners	Pro-Am Winners	Silver Winners (Note: The SRO Motorsports Group decided not to have a Silver Cup championship in the Blancpain GT Series, because Silver Cup entries are only allowed in the Blancpain GT Series Sprint Cup.)	Am Winners
1	QR	(Italy) Misano	(Belgium) No. 1 Belgian Audi Club Team WRT	**(United Kingdom) No. 8 Bentley Team M-Sport**	(Switzerland) No. 11 Kessel Racing	(Austria) No. 19 GRT Grasser Racing Team	(Germany) No. 66 Black Pearl Racing
1	QR	(Italy) Misano	(Belgium) Laurens Vanthoor (Belgium) Frédéric Vervisch	**(Spain) Andy Soucek** **(Belgium) Maxime Soulet**	(Poland) Michał Broniszewski (Italy) Giacomo Piccini	(Italy) Michele Beretta (Germany) Luca Stolz	(Germany) Christian Hook (Germany) Steve Parrow
1	MR	(Italy) Misano		**(Belgium) No. 1 Belgian Audi Club Team WRT**	(Switzerland) No. 11 Kessel Racing	(Germany) No. 5 Phoenix Racing	(Italy) No. 55 AF Corse
1	MR	(Italy) Misano		**(Belgium) Laurens Vanthoor** **(Belgium) Frédéric Vervisch**	(Poland) Michał Broniszewski (Italy) Giacomo Piccini	(Denmark) Nicolaj Møller Madsen (Germany) Markus Pommer	(Belgium) Stéphane Lémeret (Germany) Claudio Sdanewitsch
2		(Italy) Monza	(Germany) No. 84 HTP Motorsport	**(United Kingdom) No. 58 Garage 59**	(Switzerland) No. 11 Kessel Racing	Did not participate	(France) No. 87 AKKA ASP
2		(Italy) Monza	(Austria) Dominik Baumann (Germany) Maximilian Buhk (Malaysia) Jazeman Jaafar	**(United Kingdom) Rob Bell** **(New Zealand) Shane van Gisbergen** **(France) Côme Ledogar**	(Italy) Alessandro Bonacini (Poland) Michał Broniszewski (Italy) Andrea Rizzoli	Did not participate	(France) Jean-Luc Beaubelique (France) Maurice Ricci (France) Gilles Vannelet
3	QR	(United Kingdom) Brands Hatch	(Czech Republic) No. 74 ISR	**(Germany) No. 86 HTP Motorsport**	(France) No. 87 AKKA ASP	(Belgium) No. 2 Belgian Audi Club Team WRT	(Italy) No. 55 AF Corse
3	QR	(United Kingdom) Brands Hatch	(France) Franck Perera (Philippines) Marlon Stöckinger	**(Germany) Bernd Schneider** **(Netherlands) Jules Szymkowiak**	(France) Jean-Luc Beaubelique (France) Morgan Moullin-Traffort	(United Kingdom) Stuart Leonard (United Kingdom) Michael Meadows	(Belgium) Stéphane Lémeret (Germany) Claudio Sdanewitsch
3	MR	(United Kingdom) Brands Hatch		**(Belgium) No. 33 Belgian Audi Club Team WRT**	(Switzerland) No. 11 Kessel Racing	(Austria) No. 19 GRT Grasser Racing Team	(Italy) No. 55 AF Corse
3	MR	(United Kingdom) Brands Hatch		**(Belgium) Enzo Ide** **(Germany) Christopher Mies**	(Poland) Michał Broniszewski (Italy) Giacomo Piccini	(Italy) Michele Beretta (Germany) Luca Stolz	(Belgium) Stéphane Lémeret (Germany) Claudio Sdanewitsch
4		(United Kingdom) Silverstone	(Austria) No. 16 GRT Grasser Racing Team	**(Germany) No. 84 HTP Motorsport**	(Germany) No. 56 Black Falcon	Did not participate	(Germany) No. 488 Rinaldi Racing
4		(United Kingdom) Silverstone	(Netherlands) Jeroen Bleekemolen (Italy) Mirko Bortolotti (Switzerland) Rolf Ineichen	**(Austria) Dominik Baumann** **(Germany) Maximilian Buhk** **(Malaysia) Jazeman Jaafar**	(Germany) Maro Engel (United Kingdom) Oliver Morley (Spain) Miguel Toril	Did not participate	(Belgium) Stef Van Campenhout (Germany) Pierre Ehret
5		(France) Paul Ricard	(Italy) No. 50 AF Corse	**(United Kingdom) No. 58 Garage 59**	(Switzerland) No. 11 Kessel Racing	Did not participate	(Switzerland) No. 888 Kessel Racing
5		(France) Paul Ricard	(Thailand) Pasin Lathouras (Italy) Alessandro Pier Guidi (Italy) Michele Rugolo	**(United Kingdom) Rob Bell** **(New Zealand) Shane van Gisbergen** **(France) Côme Ledogar**	(Italy) Alessandro Bonacini (Poland) Michał Broniszewski (Italy) Andrea Rizzoli	Did not participate	(Russia) Vadim Gitlin (Australia) Liam Talbot (Italy) Marco Zanuttini
6	QR	(Germany) Nürburgring	(United Kingdom) No. 58 Garage 59	**(Belgium) No. 33 Belgian Audi Club Team WRT**	(Switzerland) No. 11 Kessel Racing	(Austria) No. 19 GRT Grasser Racing Team	(Italy) No. 55 AF Corse
6	QR	(Germany) Nürburgring	(United Kingdom) Rob Bell (Portugal) Álvaro Parente	**(Belgium) Enzo Ide** **(Germany) Christopher Mies**	(Poland) Michał Broniszewski (Italy) Giacomo Piccini	(Italy) Michele Beretta (Germany) Luca Stolz	(Belgium) Stéphane Lémeret (Germany) Claudio Sdanewitsch
6	MR	(Germany) Nürburgring		**(United Kingdom) No. 58 Garage 59**	(Switzerland) No. 11 Kessel Racing	(Austria) No. 19 GRT Grasser Racing Team	(Italy) No. 55 AF Corse
6	MR	(Germany) Nürburgring		**(United Kingdom) Rob Bell** **(Portugal) Álvaro Parente**	(Poland) Michał Broniszewski (Italy) Giacomo Piccini	(Italy) Michele Beretta (Germany) Luca Stolz	(Belgium) Stéphane Lémeret (Germany) Claudio Sdanewitsch
7		(Belgium) Spa-Francorchamps	(Belgium) No. 28 Audi Sport Team WRT	**(Germany) No. 99 Rowe Racing**	(France) No. 76 IMSA Performance	Did not participate	(Switzerland) No. 888 Kessel Racing
7		(Belgium) Spa-Francorchamps	(Switzerland) Nico Müller (Germany) René Rast (Belgium) Laurens Vanthoor	**(Austria) Philipp Eng** **(Belgium) Maxime Martin** **(United Kingdom) Alexander Sims**	(France) Thierry Cornac (France) Maxime Jousse (France) Raymond Narac (France) Patrick Pilet	Did not participate	(Italy) Nicola Cadei (Russia) Vadim Gitlin (Australia) Liam Talbot (Italy) Marco Zanuttini
8	QR	(Hungary) Hungaroring	(France) No. 88 AKKA ASP	**(Belgium) No. 33 Belgian Audi Club Team WRT**	(Switzerland) No. 11 Kessel Racing	(Germany) No. 5 Phoenix Racing	(Italy) No. 55 AF Corse
8	QR	(Hungary) Hungaroring	(Sweden) Felix Rosenqvist (France) Tristan Vautier	**(Belgium) Enzo Ide** **(Germany) Christopher Mies**	(Poland) Michał Broniszewski (Italy) Giacomo Piccini	(Denmark) Nicolaj Møller Madsen (Belgium) Alessio Picariello	(Italy) Rino Mastronardi (Germany) Claudio Sdanewitsch
8	MR	(Hungary) Hungaroring		**(Germany) No. 84 AMG - Team HTP Motorsport**	(France) No. 89 AKKA ASP	(Belgium) No. 2 Belgian Audi Club Team WRT	(Switzerland) No. 111 Kessel Racing
8	MR	(Hungary) Hungaroring		**(Austria) Dominik Baumann** **(Germany) Maximilian Buhk**	(France) Jean-Philippe Belloc (France) Christophe Bourret	(United Kingdom) Stuart Leonard (United Kingdom) Michael Meadows	(United States) Stephen Earle (South Africa) David Perel
9		(Germany) Nürburgring	(Austria) No. 19 GRT Grasser Racing Team	**(Austria) No. 16 GRT Grasser Racing Team**	(Germany) No. 66 Black Pearl Racing	Did not participate	(France) No. 87 AKKA ASP
9		(Germany) Nürburgring	(Italy) Michele Beretta (Italy) Andrea Piccini (Germany) Luca Stolz	**(Italy) Mirko Bortolotti** **(Germany) Christian Engelhart** **(Switzerland) Rolf Ineichen**	(Germany) Daniel Keilwitz (Germany) Alexander Mattschull (Germany) Steve Parrow	Did not participate	(France) Jean-Luc Beaubelique (France) Maurice Ricci (France) Gilles Vannelet
10	QR	(Spain) Barcelona-Catalunya	(Czech Republic) No. 74 ISR	**(Belgium) No. 33 Belgian Audi Club Team WRT**	(France) No. 87 AKKA ASP	(Germany) No. 5 Phoenix Racing	(Italy) No. 55 AF Corse
10	QR	(Spain) Barcelona-Catalunya	(France) Franck Perera (Philippines) Marlon Stöckinger	**(Netherlands) Robin Frijns** **(Belgium) Enzo Ide**	(France) Jean-Luc Beaubelique (France) Morgan Moullin-Traffort	(Denmark) Nicolaj Møller Madsen (Belgium) Alessio Picariello	(Belgium) Stéphane Lémeret (Germany) Claudio Sdanewitsch
10	MR	(Spain) Barcelona-Catalunya		**(France) No. 88 AKKA ASP**	(Germany) No. 333 Rinaldi Racing	(Germany) No. 5 Phoenix Racing	(Italy) No. 55 AF Corse
10	MR	(Spain) Barcelona-Catalunya		**(Sweden) Felix Rosenqvist** **(France) Tristan Vautier**	[[Rinat Salikhov| (Russia) ]] Rinat Salikhov (Austria) Norbert Siedler	(Denmark) Nicolaj Møller Madsen (Belgium) Alessio Picariello	(Belgium) Stéphane Lémeret (Germany) Claudio Sdanewitsch

== Championship standings ==
Scoring system

Championship points were awarded for the first six positions in each Qualifying Race and for the first ten positions in each Main Race. The pole-sitter in the Qualifying Race during Sprint Cup rounds and the pole-sitter during Endurance Cup rounds also received one point and entries were required to complete 75% of the winning car's race distance in order to be classified and earn points. Individual drivers were required to participate for a minimum of 25 minutes in order to earn championship points in any race.

Qualifying Race points

Position	**1st**	**2nd**	**3rd**	**4th**	**5th**	**6th**	**Pole**
Points	8	6	4	3	2	1	1

Main Race points

Position	**1st**	**2nd**	**3rd**	**4th**	**5th**	**6th**	**7th**	**8th**	**9th**	**10th**	**Pole**
Points	25	18	15	12	10	8	6	4	2	1	1

1000 km Paul Ricard points

Position	**1st**	**2nd**	**3rd**	**4th**	**5th**	**6th**	**7th**	**8th**	**9th**	**10th**	**Pole**
Points	33	24	19	15	12	9	6	4	2	1	1

24 Hours of Spa points

Points were awarded after six hours, after twelve hours and at the finish.

Position	**1st**	**2nd**	**3rd**	**4th**	**5th**	**6th**	**7th**	**8th**	**9th**	**10th**	**Pole**
Points after 6hrs/12hrs	12	9	7	6	5	4	3	2	1	0	1
Points at the finish	25	18	15	12	10	8	6	4	2	1	1

=== Drivers' championships ===
==== Overall ====
(key) Bold – Pole position Italics – Fastest lap

Pos.	Driver	Team	MIS (Italy)		MNZ (Italy)	BRH (United Kingdom)		SIL (United Kingdom)	LEC (France)	NÜR (Germany)		SPA (Belgium)			HUN (Hungary)		NÜR (Germany)	CAT (Spain)		Points
Pos.	Driver	Team	QR	MR	MNZ (Italy)	QR	MR	SIL (United Kingdom)	LEC (France)	QR	MR	6hrs	12hrs	24hrs	QR	MR	NÜR (Germany)	QR	MR	Points
1	(Austria) Dominik Baumann (Germany) Maximilian Buhk	(Germany) HTP Motorsport	5	2	**2**	18	7	1	Ret	10	6									134
1	(Austria) Dominik Baumann (Germany) Maximilian Buhk	(Germany) AMG - Team HTP Motorsport										13	7	6	4	1	4	6	8	134
2	(United Kingdom) Rob Bell	(United Kingdom) Garage 59	9	4	1	8	4	6	1	**2**	1	8	39	31	17	17	30	16	13	124
3	(Belgium) Laurens Vanthoor	(Belgium) Belgian Audi Club Team WRT	**3**	1	9	5	15	2	19	24	7				3	8	2	13	4	112
3	(Belgium) Laurens Vanthoor	(Belgium) Audi Sport Team WRT										**42**	20	3						112
4	(Spain) Andy Soucek (Belgium) Maxime Soulet	(United Kingdom) Bentley Team M-Sport	1	11	3	10	3	46	4	6	32	5	1	4	16	9	20	4	2	106
5	(Belgium) Frédéric Vervisch	(Belgium) Belgian Audi Club Team WRT	**3**	1	9	5	15	2	19	24	7	3	35	29	3	8	2	13	4	103
6	(Belgium) Enzo Ide	(Belgium) Belgian Audi Club Team WRT	13	8		3	1			1	4				1	2		1	3	102
7	(Germany) Christopher Mies	(Belgium) Belgian Audi Club Team WRT	13	8		3	1			1	4				1	2	Ret			97
7	(Germany) Christopher Mies	(Germany) Audi Sport Team Phoenix										2	2	50						97
8	(Austria) Philipp Eng (United Kingdom) Alexander Sims	(Germany) Rowe Racing	2	3	Ret	Ret	16	4	Ret	7	9	1	4	1	21	13	10	8	24	79
9	(Malaysia) Jazeman Jaafar	(Germany) HTP Motorsport	DNS	19	**2**	4	19	1	Ret	14	23				19	12		20	9	72
9	(Malaysia) Jazeman Jaafar	(Germany) AMG - Team HTP Motorsport										13	7	6			4			72
10	(France) Tristan Vautier	(France) AKKA ASP	7	32		9	9			27	10				**2**	4		3	1	69
10	(France) Tristan Vautier	(France) AMG - Team AKKA ASP							Ret			26	12	2						69
11	(Sweden) Felix Rosenqvist	(France) AKKA ASP	7	32		9	9			27	10				**2**	4		3	1	69
11	(Sweden) Felix Rosenqvist	(France) AMG - Team AKKA ASP										26	12	2						69
12	(France) Côme Ledogar	(United Kingdom) Garage 59			1	32	25	6	1	Ret	Ret	8	39	31	23	Ret	30			68
13	(New Zealand) Shane van Gisbergen	(United Kingdom) Garage 59			1			6	1			8	39	31						68
14	(Italy) Mirko Bortolotti	(Austria) GRT Grasser Racing Team	Ret	12	8	7	24	**3**	Ret	Ret	Ret	10	6	11	8	14	1	2	5	65
15	(Belgium) Maxime Martin	(Belgium) Boutsen Ginion	25	25																59
15	(Belgium) Maxime Martin	(Germany) Rowe Racing						4		9	8	1	4	1						59
16	(Germany) Bernd Schneider	(Germany) HTP Motorsport	Ret	7		1	2			8	3				5	5		10	31	59
16	(Germany) Bernd Schneider	(Germany) AMG - Team Black Falcon							35			45	27	20						59
17	(Netherlands) Jules Szymkowiak	(Germany) HTP Motorsport	Ret	7		1	2			8	3				5	5		10	31	59
17	(Netherlands) Jules Szymkowiak	(Germany) AMG - Team HTP Motorsport							Ret											59
18	(Belgium) Wolfgang Reip	(United Kingdom) Bentley Team M-Sport			3			46	4			5	1	4			20			59
19	(United Kingdom) Will Stevens	(Belgium) Belgian Audi Club Team WRT	14	Ret	6			9	9	3	2	3	35	29	10	3	Ret	5	18	58
20	(Belgium) Dries Vanthoor	(Belgium) Belgian Audi Club Team WRT	4	22	9	6	12	2	19	5	34	3	35	29	11	7	2	Ret	14	57
21	(Germany) René Rast	(Belgium) Belgian Audi Club Team WRT	14	Ret					9	3	2				10	3		5	18	57
21	(Germany) René Rast	(Belgium) Audi Sport Team WRT										**42**	20	3						57
22	(Portugal) Álvaro Parente	(United Kingdom) Garage 59	9	4		8	4			**2**	1				17	17		16	13	56
23	(Switzerland) Rolf Ineichen	(Austria) GRT Grasser Racing Team			8			**3**	Ret			10	6	11			1			49
24	(United Kingdom) Alex Buncombe	(United Kingdom) Nissan GT Academy Team RJN	17	14	4	21	18	Ret	5	16	14	38	33	44	20	18	3	9	11	39
25	(Japan) Mitsunori Takaboshi	(United Kingdom) Nissan GT Academy Team RJN	17	14	4	21	18	Ret	5	16	14	38	33	44			3	9	11	39
26	(Spain) Lucas Ordóñez	(United Kingdom) Nissan GT Academy Team RJN			4			Ret	5			38	33	44	20	18	3			39
27	(France) Mike Parisy	(France) Saintéloc Racing	11	Ret	12	11	6	7	6	31	17	11	13	7	6	6	12	Ret	DNS	38
28	(Germany) Christopher Haase	(France) Saintéloc Racing	11	Ret	12	11	6	7	6	31	17	11	13	7	6	6	12			38
29	(Netherlands) Robin Frijns	(Belgium) Belgian Audi Club Team WRT	4	22	33	6	12	13	Ret			19	11	Ret	11	7	8	1	3	37
30	(Switzerland) Nico Müller	(Belgium) Belgian Audi Club Team WRT			6			9		5	34							Ret	14	28
30	(Switzerland) Nico Müller	(Belgium) Audi Sport Team WRT										**42**	20	3						28
31	(Germany) Frank Stippler	(Czech Republic) ISR	8	5	31	17	20	15	11	Ret	20				7	21	11	21	12	28
31	(Germany) Frank Stippler	(Germany) Audi Sport Team Phoenix										2	2	50						28
32	(Philippines) Marlon Stöckinger	(Czech Republic) ISR	31	35	31	**2**	5	15	11	4	25	24	5	9	27	24	11	**26**	17	28
33	(Germany) Christian Engelhart	(Austria) GRT Grasser Racing Team															1			25
34	(Thailand) Pasin Lathouras (Italy) Alessandro Pier Guidi (Italy) Michele Rugolo	(Italy) AF Corse			Ret			16	**2**			32	10	16			32			25
35	(Austria) Norbert Siedler	(Germany) Rinaldi Racing	6	6	17	14	Ret	Ret		11	5							23	22	25
35	(Austria) Norbert Siedler	(Switzerland) Emil Frey Racing															7			25
36	(Netherlands) Jeroen Bleekemolen	(Austria) GRT Grasser Racing Team	Ret	Ret	8	16	17	**3**	Ret			10	6	11						24
37	(France) Franck Perera	(Czech Republic) ISR	31	35	15	**2**	5	19	15	4	25	27	9	13	27	24	16	**26**	17	22
38	(Italy) Michele Beretta (Germany) Luca Stolz	(Austria) GRT Grasser Racing Team	16	23	40	23	10	21	40	15	13	4	24	15	22	20	**6**	12	7	22
39	(France) Grégory Guilvert	(France) Saintéloc Racing			12			7	6			11	13	7			12			21
40	(France) (Monaco) Vincent Abril (Note: Vincent Abril raced under a French licence in races part of the Endurance Cup, but raced under a Monégasque licence in races part of the Sprint Cup.) (United Kingdom) Steven Kane	(United Kingdom) Bentley Team M-Sport	20	17	14	12	8	8	13	23	Ret	7	3	18	14	10	9	WD	WD	21
41	(Brazil) Rodrigo Baptista	(Belgium) Belgian Audi Club Team WRT	33	21	16	20	Ret	20	3	13	11	30	19	12	15	28	46	15	32	19
42	(Portugal) Filipe Albuquerque	(Belgium) Belgian Audi Club Team WRT	33	21	16			20	3			30	19	12						19
43	(Denmark) Jan Magnussen	(Belgium) Belgian Audi Club Team WRT							3											19
44	(Germany) Marco Seefried	(Germany) Rinaldi Racing	6	6	17	14	Ret	Ret		11	5	54	45	36						19
45	(Netherlands) Renger van der Zande	(France) AMG - Team AKKA ASP							Ret			26	12	2						18
46	(Germany) Markus Winkelhock	(Germany) Phoenix Racing	15	27		13	11			21	22				WD	WD		Ret	16	18
46	(Germany) Markus Winkelhock	(Germany) Audi Sport Team Phoenix										2	2	50						18
47	(Czech Republic) Filip Salaquarda	(Czech Republic) ISR	8	5	31	17	20	15	11	Ret	20	24	5	9	7	21	11	21	12	17
48	(Germany) Nicolas Pohler	(Austria) GRT Grasser Racing Team	Ret	12		7	24			Ret	Ret	60	54	42	8	14		2	5	16
49	(Poland) Michał Broniszewski	(Switzerland) Kessel Racing	23	13	5	30	21	29	7	18	26	23	18	22	26	29	14	30	25	16
50	(Italy) Alessandro Bonacini (Italy) Andrea Rizzoli	(Switzerland) Kessel Racing			5			29	7			23	18	22			14			16
51	(United Kingdom) Guy Smith	(United Kingdom) Bentley Team M-Sport			14			8	13			7	3	18			9			16
52	(Austria) Clemens Schmid	(Germany) HTP Motorsport	DNS	19	21	4	19	5	43	14	23	47	40	21	19	12	25	20	9	15
53	(Italy) Andrea Piccini	(Austria) GRT Grasser Racing Team			40			21	40			4	24	15			**6**			15
54	(Germany) Thomas Jäger	(Germany) AMG - Team HTP Motorsport							Ret			22	8	5						12
55	(Germany) Maximilian Götz (United Kingdom) Gary Paffett	(Germany) AMG - Team HTP Motorsport										22	8	5						12
56	(Spain) Antonio García	(Belgium) Belgian Audi Club Team WRT			6			9	9											12
57	(Germany) Alexander Mattschull	(Germany) Black Pearl Racing			11			36	38								5			10
57	(Germany) Alexander Mattschull	(Germany) Rinaldi Racing										54	45	36				25	27	10
58	(Germany) Steve Parrow	(Germany) Black Pearl Racing	28	34	11	33	26	36	38	32	33				30	27	5	29	30	10
59	(Germany) Daniel Keilwitz	(Germany) Black Pearl Racing			11	33	26	36									5			10
60	(United Kingdom) Luciano Bacheta (Netherlands) Indy Dontje	(Germany) HTP Motorsport			21			5	43			47	40	21			25			10
61	(Denmark) Nicolaj Møller Madsen	(Germany) Phoenix Racing	19	15		19	Ret			20	15				9	Ret		7	6	8
62	(Belgium) Alessio Picariello	(Germany) Phoenix Racing													9	Ret		7	6	8
63	(Germany) Pierre Kaffer (Belgium) Adrien de Leener	(Belgium) Belgian Audi Club Team WRT			26			23	Ret			6	15	8			29			8
64	(Belgium) Bertrand Baguette	(Belgium) Belgian Audi Club Team WRT										6	15	8						8
65	(Italy) Edoardo Mortara	(Czech Republic) ISR										24	5	9						7
66	(United Kingdom) Adam Christodoulou (Germany) Hubert Haupt (Sweden) Andreas Simonsen	(Germany) AMG - Team Black Falcon			7															6
66	(United Kingdom) Adam Christodoulou (Germany) Hubert Haupt (Sweden) Andreas Simonsen	(Germany) Black Falcon						11	34			12	14	33			18			6
67	(Switzerland) Jonathan Hirschi (Austria) Christian Klien	(Switzerland) Emil Frey Racing										55	57	49			7			6
68	(Netherlands) Stef Dusseldorp	(Germany) Rowe Racing	10	29	Ret	22	Ret	12	Ret	9	8	9	16	41	18	15	15	18	15	5
69	(United Kingdom) Stuart Leonard (United Kingdom) Michael Meadows	(Belgium) Belgian Audi Club Team WRT	Ret	18	33	15	Ret	13	Ret	28	18	19	11	Ret	12	11	8	14	20	4
70	(United Kingdom) Duncan Cameron (Republic of Ireland) Matt Griffin	(Italy) AF Corse			Ret				8			20	30	46			17			4
71	(Italy) Davide Rizzo	(Italy) AF Corse							8											4
71	(Italy) Davide Rizzo	(Italy) Kaspersky Motorsport										40	48	Ret			48			4
72	(Italy) Daniel Zampieri	(Germany) Attempto Racing	18	10	19	25	Ret	10	10	12	19	21	23	14	Ret	DNS	22	17	19	3
73	(Switzerland) Patric Niederhauser	(Germany) Attempto Racing	18	10	19	25	Ret	10	10	12	19	21	23	14	Ret	DNS	22			3
74	(Italy) Raffaele Giammaria (Argentina) Ezequiel Pérez Companc	(Italy) AF Corse	12	9	Ret	26	30	14	Ret	33	16	46	43	27						2
75	(Netherlands) Nick Catsburg	(Germany) Rowe Racing	10	29				12				9	16	41	18	15	10	18	15	2
76	(Italy) Fabio Babini	(Germany) Attempto Racing			19			10	10			21	23	14						2
77	(Switzerland) Philippe Giauque (France) Henry Hassid	(Czech Republic) ISR			15			19	15			27	9	13			16			1
78	(France) Nicolas Lapierre	(Czech Republic) ISR										27	9	13						1
79	(Germany) Dirk Werner	(Germany) Rowe Racing			Ret				Ret			9	16	41						1
80	(France) Romain Monti (Sweden) Edward Sandström	(France) Saintéloc Racing	26	16		27	14			19	12				Ret	16		11	10	1
81	(France) Thierry Cornac (France) Raymond Narac	(France) IMSA Performance			25			42	23			29	21	10			41			1
82	(France) Maxime Jousse	(France) IMSA Performance			25			42	23			29	21	10						1
83	(France) Patrick Pilet	(France) IMSA Performance										29	21	10						1
84	(Italy) Lorenzo Bontempelli (Japan) Motoaki Ishikawa	(Italy) AF Corse			10			34	25			65	65	Ret			37			1
85	(Italy) Giancarlo Fisichella	(Italy) AF Corse			10			34				65	65	Ret						1
	(Brazil) Sérgio Jimenez	(Belgium) Belgian Audi Club Team WRT			16	20	Ret	20		13	11	30	19	12	15	28	46	15	32	0
	(Austria) Nikolaus Mayr-Melnhof	(Germany) Phoenix Racing	15	27		13	11			21	22				WD	WD		Ret	16	0
	(Italy) Marco Mapelli	(United Kingdom) Barwell Motorsport			42			Ret	12			36	32	25			24			0
	(Italy) Marco Mapelli	(Germany) Attempto Racing				28	28													0
	(Italy) Marco Mapelli	(Austria) GRT Grasser Racing Team													13	Ret				0
	(United Kingdom) Phil Keen	(United Kingdom) Barwell Motorsport						Ret	12			25	28	17			24			0
	(Russia) Leo Machitski	(United Kingdom) Barwell Motorsport			42			Ret	12			36	32	25			24			0
	(Germany) Jens Klingmann	(Germany) Rowe Racing						12	Ret											0
	(United Kingdom) Jonathan Adam (Oman) Ahmad Al Harthy (United Kingdom) Devon Modell	(United Kingdom) Oman Racing Team			13			18	33			14	44	24			26			0
	(Netherlands) Max van Splunteren	(Germany) Attempto Racing	21	20	23	24	13	44	16	22	21	15	26	52	24	Ret	49	17	19	0
	(Netherlands) Jeroen Mul	(Germany) Attempto Racing	21	20	23	24	13	44	16	22	21	15	26	52	24	Ret	WD			0
	(Slovakia) Štefan Rosina	(Austria) GRT Grasser Racing Team	Ret	Ret		16	17			17	24				13	Ret				0
	(Italy) Giacomo Piccini	(Switzerland) Kessel Racing	23	13		30	21			18	26	23	18	22	26	29		30	25	0
	(Germany) Sebastian Asch	(Germany) Team a-workx	29	31		35	31			EX	31									0
	(Germany) Sebastian Asch	(Germany) Zakspeed															13			0
	(Germany) Luca Ludwig (Switzerland) Nikolaj Rogivue	(Germany) Zakspeed															13			0
	(United Kingdom) Andrew Watson	(United Kingdom) Garage 59			36			22	14			18	61	Ret			Ret	19	21	0
	(Switzerland) Alex Fontana (United Kingdom) Struan Moore	(United Kingdom) Garage 59			36			22	14			18	61	Ret			Ret			0
	(United Kingdom) Darren Turner	(United Kingdom) Oman Racing Team										14	44	24						0
	(Italy) Alessandro Balzan	(Italy) AF Corse			Ret			14	Ret			46	43	27						0
	(Germany) Markus Pommer	(Germany) Phoenix Racing	19	15		19	Ret			20	15									0
	(Belgium) Louis Machiels	(Germany) Attempto Racing			23			44				15	26	52			49			0
	(Italy) Giovanni Venturini	(Germany) Attempto Racing										15	26	52						0
	(Germany) Martin Tomczyk	(Italy) BMW Team Italia										62	63	Ret						0
	(Germany) Martin Tomczyk	(Germany) Rowe Racing															15			0
	(United Kingdom) Tom Blomqvist	(Germany) Rowe Racing															15			0
	(France) Laurent Cazenave (United Kingdom) Michael Lyons (Switzerland) Daniele Perfetti	(France) AKKA ASP			41			25	18			16	17	19			42			0
	(France) Morgan Moullin-Traffort	(France) AKKA ASP	27	24		29	23			26	27	16	17	19	32	23		22	26	0
	(France) Morgan Moullin-Traffort	(France) AMG - Team AKKA ASP							Ret											0
	(Netherlands) Paul van Splunteren	(Germany) Attempto Racing							16											0
	(Germany) Maro Engel	(Germany) Black Falcon			18			17	17								21			0
	(Germany) Maro Engel	(Germany) AMG - Team Black Falcon										45	27	20						0
	(United Kingdom) Oliver Morley (Spain) Miguel Toril	(Germany) Black Falcon			18			17	17			41	46	26			21			0
	(Spain) Albert Costa (Switzerland) Lorenz Frey (Monaco) Stéphane Ortelli	(Switzerland) Emil Frey Racing			20			43	42			17	22	53			Ret			0
	(Russia) Rinat Salikhov	(Germany) Rinaldi Racing			17			Ret	Ret			54	45	36			36	23	22	0
	(Italy) Davide Valsecchi	(Germany) Attempto Racing	22	DNS		28	28													0
	(Italy) Davide Valsecchi	(Austria) GRT Grasser Racing Team								17	24									0
	(United Kingdom) Joe Osborne	(United Kingdom) Barwell Motorsport			24			32				25	28	17						0
	(United Kingdom) Oliver Gavin (United Kingdom) Jon Minshaw	(United Kingdom) Barwell Motorsport										25	28	17						0
	(United Kingdom) Martin Plowman	(United Kingdom) Garage 59	Ret	26		32	25			Ret	Ret				23	Ret		19	21	0
	(United Kingdom) Sean Walkinshaw	(United Kingdom) Nissan GT Academy Team RJN	24	28	30	31	22	28	37	25	29	39	49	37	25	19	31	24	23	0
	(Mexico) Ricardo Sánchez	(United Kingdom) Nissan GT Academy Team RJN	24	28		31	22			25	29	39	49	37	25	19		24	23	0
	(France) Jean-Luc Beaubelique	(France) AKKA ASP	27	24	27	29	23	37	24	26	27				32	23	19	22	26	0
	(France) Gilles Vannelet	(France) AKKA ASP			27			37	24								19			0
	(France) Gilles Vannelet	(Italy) Antonelli Motorsport										33	41	28						0
	(France) Maurice Ricci	(France) AKKA ASP			27			37	24								19			0
	(Netherlands) Yelmer Buurman	(Germany) AMG - Team Black Falcon							35			45	27	20						0
	(Italy) Riccardo Ragazzi	(Italy) AF Corse			37							20	30	46						0
	(Italy) Riccardo Ragazzi	(Italy) Kaspersky Motorsport						41												0
	(United Kingdom) Andrew Scott	(Italy) AF Corse										20	30	46						0
	(France) Julien Darras (Luxembourg) Olivier Grotz (Saudi Arabia) Karim Ojjeh	(Belgium) Boutsen Ginion			39			35	20			59	58	Ret			35			0
	(Germany) Lance David Arnold (Germany) Alex Müller (Germany) Valentin Pierburg	(Germany) SPS Automotive Performance							21											0
	(Italy) Matteo Beretta (Italy) Giovanni Berton	(Italy) Ombra Racing			22			26	41			63	60	45			23			0
	(Italy) Stefano Costantini	(Italy) Ombra Racing			22			26	41			63	60	45						0
	(France) Jean-Philippe Belloc (France) Christophe Bourret	(France) AKKA ASP				34	27			30	30				28	22		27	28	0
	(Russia) Vadim Gitlin (Australia) Liam Talbot (Italy) Marco Zanuttini	(Switzerland) Kessel Racing			Ret			45	22			43	36	32			43			0
	(Finland) Jesse Krohn	(Germany) Rowe Racing				22	Ret													0
	(United Kingdom) Jack Falla	(Germany) Attempto Racing	22	DNS																0
	(Germany) Christian Mamerow	(Germany) Attempto Racing															22			0
	(Italy) Matteo Malucelli (Czech Republic) Jiří Písařík	(Czech Republic) Scuderia Praha			Ret			31	Ret			35	25	23						0
	(Italy) David Fumanelli (Czech Republic) Josef Král	(Czech Republic) Scuderia Praha										35	25	23						0
	(Netherlands) Peter Kox	(Belgium) Belgian Audi Club Team WRT			26			23	Ret											0
	(Italy) Alex Frassineti	(Italy) Ombra Racing															23			0
	(France) Jules Gounon (Austria) Christopher Zöchling	(Austria) Konrad Motorsport			Ret			24				28	29	30			27			0
	(United Kingdom) Richard Abra (United Kingdom) Mark Poole	(United Kingdom) Barwell Motorsport			24			32												0
	(United Kingdom) Daniel Cammish	(Austria) Konrad Motorsport						24												0
	(Finland) Matias Henkola	(Belgium) Boutsen Ginion	25	25																0
	(Germany) Christopher Brück	(Austria) Konrad Motorsport			Ret															0
	(Germany) Christopher Brück	(Germany) Rinaldi Racing																25	27	0
	(South Africa) David Perel	(Switzerland) Kessel Racing			Ret			Ret	28						31	25				0
	(South Africa) David Perel	(United Kingdom) Team Parker Racing										61	53	54						0
	(United States) Stephen Earle	(Switzerland) Kessel Racing			Ret			Ret	28						31	25				0
	(United Kingdom) Marco Attard	(United Kingdom) Barwell Motorsport			42							36	32	25						0
	(United Kingdom) Tom Kimber-Smith	(United Kingdom) Barwell Motorsport										36	32	25						0
	(Monaco) Olivier Beretta	(Italy) AF Corse							25			65	65	Ret			37			0
	(Germany) Claudio Sdanewitsch	(Italy) AF Corse	30	30		36	29			29	28				29	26	39	28	29	0
	(Italy) Rino Mastronardi	(Italy) AF Corse			Ret			Ret	29			44	37	34	29	26	38			0
	(Saudi Arabia) Abdulaziz Bin Turki Al Faisal	(Germany) AMG - Team Black Falcon							35											0
	(Saudi Arabia) Abdulaziz Bin Turki Al Faisal	(Germany) Black Falcon										41	46	26						0
	(Italy) Marco Bonanomi	(France) Saintéloc Racing			Ret			39	26			57	51	43			44	Ret	DNS	0
	(France) Marc Rostan	(France) Saintéloc Racing			Ret			39	26			57	51	43			44			0
	(Spain) Daniel Juncadella	(Germany) Black Falcon										41	46	26						0
	(Belgium) Christian Kelders	(France) Saintéloc Racing			Ret				26			57	51	43			44			0
	(United Kingdom) Craig Dolby	(United Kingdom) Garage 59	Ret	26																0
	(Germany) Christian Hook	(Germany) Black Pearl Racing	28	34						32	33				30	27		29	30	0
	(United Kingdom) Ian Loggie (United Kingdom) Callum MacLeod (United Kingdom) Tom Onslow-Cole	(United Kingdom) Team Parker Racing			35			27	Ret			37	62	Ret						0
	(France) Thomas Nicolle	(France) CMR by Sport Garage			38			47	27											0
	(France) Thomas Nicolle	(France) Classic & Modern Racing										52	59	Ret						0
	(France) Romain Brandela	(France) CMR by Sport Garage							27											0
	(France) Romain Brandela	(France) Classic & Modern Racing										51	50	Ret			Ret			0
	(France) Christophe Hamon	(France) CMR by Sport Garage							27											0
	(France) Christophe Hamon	(France) Classic & Modern Racing															Ret			0
	(Germany) Hendrik Still	(Austria) Konrad Motorsport															27			0
	(Belgium) Stéphane Lémeret	(Italy) AF Corse	30	30		36	29		Ret	29	28						39	28	29	0
	(Belgium) Stéphane Lémeret	(Italy) Kaspersky Motorsport										40	48	Ret						0
	(Netherlands) Rik Breukers (Austria) Luca Rettenbacher	(Austria) Konrad Motorsport										28	29	30						0
	(Italy) Stefano Colombo (Netherlands) Max Koebolt	(Italy) BMW Team Italia			Ret			30	30			62	63	Ret			28			0
	(France) Romain Sarazin (Australia) Matt Simmons	(United Kingdom) Nissan GT Academy Team RJN			30			28	37			39	49	37			31			0
	(Germany) Pierre Ehret	(Germany) Rinaldi Racing			28			33	Ret			54	45	36			36			0
	(Italy) Michela Cerruti	(Italy) Antonelli Motorsport							39			33	41	28						0
	(Monaco) Cédric Sbirrazzuoli (Italy) Loris Spinelli	(Italy) Antonelli Motorsport										33	41	28						0
	(Belgium) Stef Van Campenhout	(Germany) Rinaldi Racing			28			33												0
	(Belgium) Bernard Delhez	(Switzerland) Kessel Racing			Ret			Ret	28											0
	(Belgium) Bernard Delhez	(France) Classic & Modern Racing										51	50	Ret			Ret			0
	(Italy) Stefano Comandini	(Italy) BMW Team Italia															28			0
	(Germany) Didi Gonzales	(Germany) Team a-workx	29	31		35	31			EX	31									0
	(Portugal) Francisco Guedes (United States) Peter Mann	(Italy) AF Corse			Ret			Ret	29			44	37	34			38			0
	(France) Nicolas Armindo (Germany) Jürgen Häring (France) Clément Mateu	(Germany) Attempto Racing			29			DNS	Ret			64	64	Ret			47			0
	(United Kingdom) Ben Barnicoat	(Belgium) Belgian Audi Club Team WRT															29			0
	(Italy) Giorgio Roda	(Italy) BMW Team Italia			Ret			30	30			62	63	Ret						0
	(United Kingdom) Duncan Tappy	(United Kingdom) Garage 59										31	31	40			30			0
	(Brazil) Pipo Derani (Brazil) Bruno Senna	(United Kingdom) Garage 59										31	31	40						0
	(Slovakia) Miroslav Konôpka (Poland) Andrzej Lewandowski (Poland) Teodor Myszkowski	(Slovakia) ARC Bratislava			34			38	31			49	47	39			DNS			0
	(Switzerland) Laurent Jenny (Switzerland) Cédric Leimer	(Switzerland) X-Bionic Racing Team	32	33																0
	(United Kingdom) Chris Harris (United Kingdom) Derek Pierce	(United Kingdom) Team Parker Racing			Ret			40	32			61	53	54			34			0
	(Italy) Nicola Cadei	(Switzerland) Kessel Racing										43	36	32						0
	(United Kingdom) Chris Cooper	(United Kingdom) Team Parker Racing			Ret			40	32											0
	(Italy) Lorenzo Casè (Italy) Marco Magli (Italy) Cristian Passuti	(Italy) Antonelli Motorsport			32															0
	(United Kingdom) Bradley Ellis (United Kingdom) Euan Hankey (Turkey) Salih Yoluc	(Germany) Black Falcon															33			0
	(Italy) Matteo Cressoni	(Italy) AF Corse										44	37	34						0
	(Italy) Ferdinando Geri (Italy) Daniel Mancinelli (United States) Gregory Romanelli (Italy) Niccolò Schirò	(Italy) Easy Race										34	38	38						0
	(Italy) Francesco Castellacci (Italy) Marco Cioci (Switzerland) Thomas Flohr (Italy) Piergiuseppe Perazzini	(Austria) AT Racing										48	34	Ret						0
	(Australia) Roger Lago (Australia) Steve Owen (Australia) David Russell (Australia) Jonathon Webb	(Australia) Lago Racing										50	42	35						0
	(France) Romano Ricci	(France) CMR by Sport Garage						47	36											0
	(France) Theo Filler	(France) CMR by Sport Garage			Ret				36											0
	(France) Nicolas Melin	(France) CMR by Sport Garage							36											0
	(Russia) Alexander Moiseev	(Italy) AF Corse			37				Ret											0
	(Russia) Alexander Moiseev	(Italy) Kaspersky Motorsport						41				40	48	Ret			48			0
	(Russia) Garry Kondakov	(Italy) AF Corse			37															0
	(Russia) Garry Kondakov	(Italy) Kaspersky Motorsport						41												0
	(United Kingdom) Andy Meyrick	(United Kingdom) Team Parker Racing										37	62	Ret						0
	(France) Nyls Stievenart	(France) CMR by Sport Garage			38			47												0
	(Germany) Jörg Viebahn	(France) CMR by Sport Garage			38															0
	(Germany) Dominik Schwager	(Germany) Black Pearl Racing							38											0
	(Slovakia) Zdeno Mikuláško	(Slovakia) ARC Bratislava										49	47	39						0
	(France) Gilles Lallemant	(France) Saintéloc Racing						39				53	56	51						0
	(Italy) Alberto Di Folco (Italy) Raffaele Giannoni	(Italy) Antonelli Motorsport							39											0
	(Italy) Thomas Kemenater	(Italy) AF Corse															39			0
	(Portugal) Rui Águas	(Italy) Kaspersky Motorsport										40	48	Ret						0
	(Germany) Marc Basseng (Austria) Horst Felbermayr Jr. (Germany) Andreas Weishaupt	(Germany) Car Collection Motorsport															40			0
	(France) Mathieu Jaminet	(France) IMSA Performance															41			0
	(Italy) Diego Alessi (Denmark) Dennis Andersen (Denmark) Anders Fjordbach	(Austria) GRT Grasser Racing Team										60	54	42						0
	(Belgium) Frédéric Bouvy	(France) Saintéloc Racing										57	51	43						0
	(Italy) Stefano Gattuso	(Italy) Ombra Racing										63	60	45						0
	(Argentina) José Manuel Balbiani (Belgium) Angélique Detavernier (Belgium) Louis-Philippe Soenen	(Portugal) Sports & You															45			0
	(France) Adrien Tambay	(Belgium) Belgian Audi Club Team WRT															46			0
	(Finland) Markus Palttala	(Switzerland) Emil Frey Racing										55	57	49						0
	(France) Timothé Buret (France) Mickaël Petit	(France) Classic & Modern Racing										50	51	Ret						0
	(France) Michael Blanchemain (France) Jean-Paul Buffin (France) Valentin Hasse-Clot	(France) Saintéloc Racing										53	56	51						0
	(France) Sylvain Debs (France) David Loger (France) Eric Mouez	(France) Classic & Modern Racing										52	59	Ret						0
	(Sweden) Carl Rosenblad	(United Kingdom) Team Parker Racing										61	53	54						0
	(France) Arno Santamato	(Belgium) Boutsen Ginion										59	58	Ret						0
	(France) Kévin Estre	(Germany) Attempto Racing										64	64	Ret						0
	(Germany) Lucas Luhr	(Germany) Rowe Racing			Ret				Ret											
	(France) Benjamin Lariche (France) Dino Lunardi	(France) CMR by Sport Garage			Ret															
	(Germany) Klaus Graf	(Germany) Rowe Racing			Ret															
	(Canada) Jean-Frédéric Laberge (Canada) Alex Tagliani (Canada) Darryl O'Young	(Germany) Zakspeed			Ret															
	(Germany) Christian Hohenadel	(Germany) AMG - Team HTP Motorsport							Ret											
	(Netherlands) Stéphane Kox	(Czech Republic) Scuderia Praha							Ret											
	(United States) Connor De Phillippi	(Belgium) Belgian Audi Club Team WRT															Ret			
Drivers ineligible to score points
	(France) Jean-Marc Bachelier (United States) Howard Blank (France) Yannick Mallegol (Monaco) Fabrice Notari	(Switzerland) RMS										56	52	47						
	(Belgium) Wim Meulders (Belgium) Grégory Paisse (Belgium) Pierre-Yves Paque (France) Philippe Richard	(Belgium) SpeedLover										58	55	48						
Pos.	Driver	Team	QR	MR	MNZ (Italy)	QR	MR	SIL (United Kingdom)	LEC (France)	QR	MR	6hrs	12hrs	24hrs	QR	MR	NÜR (Germany)	QR	MR	Points
Pos.	Driver	Team	MIS (Italy)		MNZ (Italy)	BRH (United Kingdom)		SIL (United Kingdom)	LEC (France)	NÜR (Germany)		SPA (Belgium)			HUN (Hungary)		NÜR (Germany)	CAT (Spain)		Points

==== Pro-Am Cup ====
Pos.	Driver	Team	MIS (Italy)		MNZ (Italy)	BRH (United Kingdom)		SIL (United Kingdom)	LEC (France)	NÜR (Germany)		SPA (Belgium)			HUN (Hungary)		NÜR (Germany)	CAT (Spain)		Points
Pos.	Driver	Team	QR	MR	MNZ (Italy)	QR	MR	SIL (United Kingdom)	LEC (France)	QR	MR	6hrs	12hrs	24hrs	QR	MR	NÜR (Germany)	QR	MR	Points
1	(Poland) Michał Broniszewski	(Switzerland) Kessel Racing	**23**	13	5	30	23	29	7	**18**	26	23	18	22	24	29	14	**30**	25	245
2	(Italy) Giacomo Piccini	(Switzerland) Kessel Racing	**23**	13		30	23			**18**	26	23	18	22	24	29		**30**	25	165
3	(France) Morgan Moullin-Traffort	(France) AKKA ASP	27	24		**29**	23			26	27	16	17	19	**32**	23		22	26	147
4	(France) Jean-Luc Beaubelique	(France) AKKA ASP	27	24		**29**	23			26	27				**32**	23		22	26	119
5	(Italy) Alessandro Bonacini (Italy) Andrea Rizzoli	(Switzerland) Kessel Racing			5			29	7			23	18	22			14			102
6	(Switzerland) Philippe Giauque (France) Henry Hassid (France) Franck Perera	(Czech Republic) ISR			15			**19**	15			27	9	13			16			89
7	(France) Jean-Philippe Belloc (France) Christophe Bourret	(France) AKKA ASP				34	27			30	30				28	22		27	28	78
8	(Germany) Steve Parrow	(Germany) Black Pearl Racing			11	33	26	36	38								5			59
9	(Germany) Daniel Keilwitz	(Germany) Black Pearl Racing			11	33	26	36									5			59
10	(Germany) Alexander Mattschull	(Germany) Black Pearl Racing			11			36	38								5			56
10	(Germany) Alexander Mattschull	(Germany) Rinaldi Racing																25	27	56
11	(United Kingdom) Oliver Morley (Spain) Miguel Toril	(Germany) Black Falcon			18			17	17			41	46	26			21			54
12	(United Kingdom) Jonathan Adam (Oman) Ahmad Al Harthy (United Kingdom) Devon Modell	(United Kingdom) Oman Racing Team			13			18	33			14	44	24			**26**			53
13	(Germany) Maro Engel	(Germany) Black Falcon			18			17	17								21			52
14	(United Kingdom) Phil Keen	(United Kingdom) Barwell Motorsport						Ret	12			25	28	17			24			47
15	(France) Laurent Cazenave (United Kingdom) Michael Lyons (Switzerland) Daniele Perfetti	(France) AKKA ASP			41			25	18			16	17	19			42			46
16	(United Kingdom) Duncan Cameron (Republic of Ireland) Matt Griffin	(Italy) AF Corse			Ret				8			20	30	46			17			43
17	(Germany) Sebastian Asch (Germany) Didi Gonzales	(Germany) Team a-workx	29	31		35	31			EX	31									39
18	(France) Thierry Cornac (France) Raymond Narac	(France) IMSA Performance			25			42	23			29	21	10			41			35
19	(France) Maxime Jousse	(France) IMSA Performance			25			42	23			29	21	10						35
20	(France) Nicolas Lapierre	(Czech Republic) ISR										27	9	13						33
21	(France) Patrick Pilet	(France) IMSA Performance										29	21	10						32
22	(Russia) Rinat Salikhov (Austria) Norbert Siedler	(Germany) Rinaldi Racing																23	22	31
23	(Russia) Leo Machitski (Italy) Marco Mapelli	(United Kingdom) Barwell Motorsport			42			Ret	12			36	32	25			24			29
24	(Netherlands) Max van Splunteren	(Germany) Attempto Racing			23			44	16			15	26	52			49			29
25	(Netherlands) Jeroen Mul	(Germany) Attempto Racing			23			44	16			15	26	52			WD			29
26	(Italy) Davide Rizzo	(Italy) AF Corse							8											24
27	(United Kingdom) Joe Osborne	(United Kingdom) Barwell Motorsport			24			32				25	28	17						24
28	(Italy) Matteo Beretta (Italy) Giovanni Berton	(Italy) Ombra Racing			22			26	41			63	60	45			23			24
29	(United Kingdom) Oliver Gavin (United Kingdom) Jon Minshaw	(United Kingdom) Barwell Motorsport										25	28	17						22
30	(Italy) Lorenzo Bontempelli (Japan) Motoaki Ishikawa	(Italy) AF Corse			**10**			34	**25**			65	65	Ret			37			21
31	(Finland) Matias Henkola (Belgium) Maxime Martin	(Belgium) Boutsen Ginion	25	25																21
32	(Italy) Giancarlo Fisichella	(Italy) AF Corse			**10**			34				65	65	Ret						19
33	(United Kingdom) Darren Turner	(United Kingdom) Oman Racing Team										14	44	24						18
34	(Belgium) Louis Machiels	(Germany) Attempto Racing			23			44				15	26	52			49			17
35	(Germany) Christopher Brück	(Germany) Rinaldi Racing																25	27	16
36	(Italy) Stefano Costantini	(Italy) Ombra Racing			22			26	41			63	60	45						16
37	(Italy) Matteo Malucelli (Czech Republic) Jiří Písařík	(Czech Republic) Scuderia Praha			Ret			31	Ret			35	25	23						14
38	(Italy) Giovanni Venturini	(Germany) Attempto Racing										15	26	52						13
39	(Italy) David Fumanelli (Czech Republic) Josef Král	(Czech Republic) Scuderia Praha										35	25	23						13
40	(Netherlands) Paul van Splunteren	(Germany) Attempto Racing							16											12
41	(United Kingdom) Ian Loggie (United Kingdom) Callum MacLeod (United Kingdom) Tom Onslow-Cole	(United Kingdom) Team Parker Racing			35			27	Ret			**37**	62	Ret						9
42	(Italy) Alex Frassineti	(Italy) Ombra Racing															23			8
43	(Italy) Riccardo Ragazzi (United Kingdom) Andrew Scott	(Italy) AF Corse										20	30	46						7
44	(France) Romain Sarazin (Australia) Matt Simmons (United Kingdom) Sean Walkinshaw	(United Kingdom) Nissan GT Academy Team RJN			30			28	37			39	49	37			31			6
45	(France) Jules Gounon (Austria) Christopher Zöchling	(Austria) Konrad Motorsport										28	29	30			27			6
46	(France) Julien Darras (Luxembourg) Olivier Grotz (Saudi Arabia) Karim Ojjeh	(Belgium) Boutsen Ginion			39			35	20			59	58	Ret			35			4
47	(United Kingdom) Marco Attard	(United Kingdom) Barwell Motorsport			42							36	32	25						4
48	(United Kingdom) Tom Kimber-Smith	(United Kingdom) Barwell Motorsport										36	32	25						4
49	(Netherlands) Rik Breukers (Austria) Luca Rettenbacher	(Austria) Konrad Motorsport										28	29	30						4
50	(Italy) Stefano Colombo (Netherlands) Max Koebolt	(Italy) BMW Team Italia			Ret			30	30			62	63	Ret			28			3
51	(Italy) Giorgio Roda	(Italy) BMW Team Italia			Ret			30	30			62	63	Ret						2
52	(United Kingdom) Richard Abra (United Kingdom) Mark Poole	(United Kingdom) Barwell Motorsport			24			32												2
53	(Monaco) Olivier Beretta	(Italy) AF Corse							**25**			65	65	Ret			37			2
54	(Saudi Arabia) Abdulaziz Bin Turki Al Faisal (Spain) Daniel Juncadella	(Germany) Black Falcon										41	46	26						2
55	(Germany) Hendrik Still	(Austria) Konrad Motorsport															27			2
56	(Italy) Michela Cerruti	(Italy) Antonelli Motorsport							39			33	41	28						1
57	(Monaco) Cédric Sbirrazzuoli (Italy) Loris Spinelli (France) Gilles Vannelet	(Italy) Antonelli Motorsport										33	41	28						1
58	(Italy) Stefano Comandini	(Italy) BMW Team Italia															28			1
59	(United Kingdom) Andy Meyrick	(United Kingdom) Team Parker Racing										**37**	62	Ret						1
	(Italy) Marco Bonanomi (France) Marc Rostan	(France) Saintéloc Racing			Ret			39	26			57	51	43			44			0
	(Belgium) Christian Kelders	(France) Saintéloc Racing			Ret				26			57	51	43			44			0
	(France) Nicolas Armindo (Germany) Jürgen Häring (France) Clément Mateu	(Germany) Attempto Racing			29			DNS	Ret			64	64	Ret			47			0
	(Italy) Lorenzo Casè (Italy) Marco Magli (Italy) Cristian Passuti	(Italy) Antonelli Motorsport			32															0
	(United Kingdom) Bradley Ellis (United Kingdom) Euan Hankey (Turkey) Salih Yoluc	(Germany) Black Falcon															33			0
	(Italy) Ferdinando Geri (Italy) Daniel Mancinelli (United States) Gregory Romanelli (Italy) Niccolò Schirò	(Italy) Easy Race										34	38	38						0
	(Italy) Francesco Castellacci (Italy) Marco Cioci (Switzerland) Thomas Flohr (Italy) Piergiuseppe Perazzini	(Austria) AT Racing										48	34	Ret						0
	(Australia) Roger Lago (Australia) Steve Owen (Australia) David Russell (Australia) Jonathon Webb	(Australia) Lago Racing										50	42	35						0
	(Mexico) Ricardo Sánchez	(United Kingdom) Nissan GT Academy Team RJN										39	49	37						0
	(Germany) Dominik Schwager	(Germany) Black Pearl Racing							38											0
	(France) Gilles Lallemant	(France) Saintéloc Racing						39												0
	(Italy) Alberto Di Folco (Italy) Raffaele Giannoni	(Italy) Antonelli Motorsport							39											0
	(Germany) Marc Basseng (Austria) Horst Felbermayr Jr. (Germany) Andreas Weishaupt	(Germany) Car Collection Motorsport															40			0
	(France) Mathieu Jaminet	(France) IMSA Performance															41			0
	(Italy) Diego Alessi (Denmark) Dennis Andersen (Denmark) Anders Fjordbach (Germany) Nicolas Pohler	(Austria) GRT Grasser Racing Team										60	54	42						0
	(Belgium) Frédéric Bouvy	(France) Saintéloc Racing										57	51	43						0
	(Italy) Stefano Gattuso	(Italy) Ombra Racing										63	60	45						0
	(France) Arno Santamato	(Belgium) Boutsen Ginion										59	58	Ret						0
	(Germany) Martin Tomczyk	(Italy) BMW Team Italia										62	63	Ret						0
	(France) Kévin Estre	(Germany) Attempto Racing										64	64	Ret						0
	(France) Theo Filler (France) Benjamin Lariche (France) Dino Lunardi	(France) CMR by Sport Garage			Ret															
	(Netherlands) Stéphane Kox	(Czech Republic) Scuderia Praha							Ret											
Pos.	Driver	Team	QR	MR	MNZ (Italy)	QR	MR	SIL (United Kingdom)	LEC (France)	QR	MR	6hrs	12hrs	24hrs	QR	MR	NÜR (Germany)	QR	MR	Points
Pos.	Driver	Team	MIS (Italy)		MNZ (Italy)	BRH (United Kingdom)		SIL (United Kingdom)	LEC (France)	NÜR (Germany)		SPA (Belgium)			HUN (Hungary)		NÜR (Germany)	CAT (Spain)		Points

==== Am Cup ====
Pos.	Driver	Team	MIS (Italy)		MNZ (Italy)	BRH (United Kingdom)		SIL (United Kingdom)	LEC (France)	NÜR (Germany)		SPA (Belgium)			HUN (Hungary)		NÜR (Germany)	CAT (Spain)		Points
Pos.	Driver	Team	QR	MR	MNZ (Italy)	QR	MR	SIL (United Kingdom)	LEC (France)	QR	MR	6hrs	12hrs	24hrs	QR	MR	NÜR (Germany)	QR	MR	Points
1	(Germany) Claudio Sdanewitsch	(Italy) AF Corse	**30**	30		**36**	29			**29**	28				**29**	26	39	**28**	29	171
2	(Belgium) Stéphane Lémeret	(Italy) AF Corse	**30**	30		**36**	29		Ret	**29**	28						39	**28**	29	161
2	(Belgium) Stéphane Lémeret	(Italy) Kaspersky Motorsport										40	48	Ret						161
3	(Russia) Vadim Gitlin (Australia) Liam Talbot (Italy) Marco Zanuttini	(Switzerland) Kessel Racing			Ret			45	22			**43**	36	32			43			96
4	(France) Jean-Luc Beaubelique (France) Maurice Ricci (France) Gilles Vannelet	(France) AKKA ASP			27			37	24								19			92
5	(Germany) Christian Hook (Germany) Steve Parrow	(Germany) Black Pearl Racing	28	34						32	33				30	27		29	30	92
6	(Italy) Rino Mastronardi	(Italy) AF Corse			**Ret**			Ret	29			44	37	34	**29**	26	**38**			87
7	(Germany) Pierre Ehret	(Germany) Rinaldi Racing			28			33	Ret			54	45	36			36			82
8	(Slovakia) Miroslav Konôpka (Poland) Andrzej Lewandowski (Poland) Teodor Myszkowski	(Slovakia) ARC Bratislava			34			38	31			49	47	39			DNS			63
9	(Portugal) Francisco Guedes (United States) Peter Mann	(Italy) AF Corse			**Ret**			Ret	29			44	37	34			**38**			60
10	(South Africa) David Perel	(Switzerland) Kessel Racing			Ret			**Ret**	**28**						31	25				58
10	(South Africa) David Perel	(United Kingdom) Team Parker Racing										61	53	54						58
11	(United Kingdom) Chris Harris (United Kingdom) Derek Pierce	(United Kingdom) Team Parker Racing			Ret			40	32			61	53	54			34			48
12	(Italy) Nicola Cadei	(Switzerland) Kessel Racing										**43**	36	32						47
13	(United States) Stephen Earle	(Switzerland) Kessel Racing			Ret			**Ret**	**28**						31	25				46
14	(Belgium) Stef Van Campenhout	(Germany) Rinaldi Racing			28			33												43
15	(Russia) Alexander Moiseev	(Italy) AF Corse			37				Ret											43
15	(Russia) Alexander Moiseev	(Italy) Kaspersky Motorsport						41				40	48	Ret			48			43
16	(France) Thomas Nicolle	(France) CMR by Sport Garage			38			47	27											40
16	(France) Thomas Nicolle	(France) Classic & Modern Racing										52	59	Ret						40
17	(Russia) Rinat Salikhov	(Germany) Rinaldi Racing							Ret			54	45	36			36			39
18	(Italy) Matteo Cressoni	(Italy) AF Corse										44	37	34						34
19	(France) Romain Brandela	(France) CMR by Sport Garage							27											28
19	(France) Romain Brandela	(France) Classic & Modern Racing										51	50	Ret			Ret			28
20	(Belgium) Bernard Delhez	(Switzerland) Kessel Racing			Ret			**Ret**	**28**											26
20	(Belgium) Bernard Delhez	(France) Classic & Modern Racing										51	50	Ret			Ret			26
21	(Germany) Alexander Mattschull (Germany) Marco Seefried	(Germany) Rinaldi Racing							Ret			54	45	36						24
22	(Slovakia) Zdeno Mikuláško	(Slovakia) ARC Bratislava										49	47	39						24
23	(Switzerland) Laurent Jenny (Switzerland) Cédric Leimer	(Switzerland) X-Bionic Racing Team	32	33																22
24	(Russia) Garry Kondakov (Italy) Riccardo Ragazzi	(Italy) AF Corse			37															22
24	(Russia) Garry Kondakov (Italy) Riccardo Ragazzi	(Italy) Kaspersky Motorsport						41												22
25	(Italy) Davide Rizzo	(Italy) Kaspersky Motorsport										40	48	Ret			48			21
26	(France) Christophe Hamon	(France) CMR by Sport Garage							27											19
26	(France) Christophe Hamon	(France) Classic & Modern Racing															Ret			19
27	(United Kingdom) Chris Cooper	(United Kingdom) Team Parker Racing			Ret			40	32											18
28	(Portugal) Rui Águas	(Italy) Kaspersky Motorsport										40	48	Ret						17
29	(France) Nyls Stievenart	(France) CMR by Sport Garage			38			47												16
30	(France) Michael Blanchemain (France) Jean-Paul Buffin (France) Valentin Hasse-Clot (France) Gilles Lallemant	(France) Saintéloc Racing										53	56	51						15
31	(Sweden) Carl Rosenblad	(United Kingdom) Team Parker Racing										61	53	54						12
32	(Germany) Jörg Viebahn	(France) CMR by Sport Garage			38															10
33	(Italy) Thomas Kemenater	(Italy) AF Corse															39			10
34	(France) Romano Ricci	(France) CMR by Sport Garage						47	36											10
35	(France) Timothé Buret (France) Mickaël Petit	(France) Classic & Modern Racing										51	50	Ret						9
36	(Argentina) José Manuel Balbiani (Belgium) Angélique Detavernier (Belgium) Louis-Philippe Soenen	(Portugal) Sports & You															45			6
37	(France) Sylvain Debs (France) David Loger (France) Eric Mouez	(France) Classic & Modern Racing										52	59	Ret						5
38	(France) Theo Filler (France) Nicolas Melin	(France) CMR by Sport Garage							36											4
Pos.	Driver	Team	QR	MR	MNZ (Italy)	QR	MR	SIL (United Kingdom)	LEC (France)	QR	MR	6hrs	12hrs	24hrs	QR	MR	NÜR (Germany)	QR	MR	Points
Pos.	Driver	Team	MIS (Italy)		MNZ (Italy)	BRH (United Kingdom)		SIL (United Kingdom)	LEC (France)	NÜR (Germany)		SPA (Belgium)			HUN (Hungary)		NÜR (Germany)	CAT (Spain)		Points

=== Teams' championships ===
==== Overall ====
Pos.	Team	Manufacturer	MIS (Italy)		MNZ (Italy)	BRH (United Kingdom)		SIL (United Kingdom)	LEC (France)	NÜR (Germany)		SPA (Belgium)			HUN (Hungary)		NÜR (Germany)	CAT (Spain)		Points
Pos.	Team	Manufacturer	QR	MR	MNZ (Italy)	QR	MR	SIL (United Kingdom)	LEC (France)	QR	MR	6hrs	12hrs	24hrs	QR	MR	NÜR (Germany)	QR	MR	Points
1	(Germany) (AMG - Team) HTP Motorsport	Mercedes-Benz	5	2	**2**	1	2	1	43	8	3	13	7	5	4	1	4	6	8	167
2	(Belgium) Belgian Audi Club/Audi Sport Team WRT	Audi	**3**	1	6	5	12	2	9	3	2	**3**	11	3	3	3	2	5	4	160
3	(Belgium) Team WRT (Note: Only a limited number of cars per team were able to score points toward the Teams' championship. Therefore cars No. 2 (in Sprint Cup rounds), 3, 4 (in Endurance Cup rounds) and 33 entered as Belgian Audi Club Team WRT, but in the Teams' championship the drivers of cars No. 2, 3, 4 and 33 scored points for Team WRT.)	Audi	13	8	16	3	1	20	3	1	4	6	15	8	1	2	29	1	3	133
4	(United Kingdom) Garage 59	McLaren	9	4	1	8	4	6	1	**2**	1	8	31	31	17	17	30	16	13	130
5	(United Kingdom) Bentley Team M-Sport	Bentley	1	11	3	10	3	8	4	6	32	5	1	4	14	9	9	4	2	126
6	(Germany) Rowe Racing	BMW	2	3	Ret	22	16	4	Ret	7	8	1	4	1	18	13	10	8	15	96
7	(Austria) GRT Grasser Racing Team	Lamborghini	16	12	8	7	10	**3**	40	15	13	4	6	11	8	14	**1**	2	5	86
8	(France) (AMG - Team) AKKA ASP	Mercedes-Benz	7	24	27	9	9	25	18	26	10	16	12	2	**2**	4	19	3	1	80
9	(France) Saintéloc Racing	Audi	11	16	12	11	6	7	6	19	12	11	13	7	6	6	12	11	10	56
10	(Czech Republic) ISR	Audi	8	5	15	**2**	5	15	11	4	20	24	5	9	7	21	11	**21**	12	45
11	(United Kingdom) Nissan GT Academy Team RJN	Nissan	17	14	4	21	18	28	5	16	14	38	33	37	20	18	3	9	11	43
12	(Germany) Rinaldi Racing/Black Pearl Racing	Ferrari	6	6	11	14	26	33	38	11	5	54	45	36	30	27	5	23	22	31
13	(Switzerland) Spirit of Race (Note: Only a limited number of cars per team were able to score points toward the Teams' championship. Therefore cars No. 50, 51 and 90 entered as AF Corse, but in the Teams' championship the drivers of cars No. 50, 51 and 90 scored points for Spirit of Race under Swiss licence. At Round 7 also the drivers of car No. 49 scored points for Spirit of Race. This applies to the Endurance Cup rounds only.)	Ferrari			Ret			14	**2**			32	10	16			32			29
14	(Germany) Audi Sport Team Phoenix	Audi										2	2	50						18
15	(Switzerland) Kessel Racing	Ferrari	23	13	5	30	21	29	7	18	26	23	18	22	26	25	14	30	25	16
16	(Germany) Phoenix Racing	Audi	15	15		13	11			20	15				9	Ret		7	6	10
17	(Italy) AF Corse/Kaspersky Motorsport (Austria) AT Racing	Ferrari	12	9	10	26	29	16	8	29	16	20	30	46	29	26	17	28	29	10
18	(Switzerland) Emil Frey Racing	Jaguar			20			43	42			17	22	49			7			8
19	(Germany) Attempto Racing	Lamborghini/Porsche	18	10	19	24	13	10	10	12	19	15	23	14	24	Ret	22	17	19	7
20	(Germany) AMG - Team Black Falcon	Mercedes-Benz			7				35			45	27	20						6
21	(Germany) Black Falcon	Mercedes-Benz			18			11	17			12	14	26			18			3
22	(France) IMSA Performance	Porsche			25			42	23			29	21	10			41			2
	(United Kingdom) Barwell Motorsport	Lamborghini			24			32	12			25	28	17			24			0
	(United Kingdom) Oman Racing Team	Aston Martin			13			18	33			14	44	24			26			0
	(Germany) Zakspeed	Mercedes-Benz			Ret												13			0
	(Belgium) Boutsen Ginion	BMW	25	25	39			35	20			59	58	Ret			35			0
	(Germany) SPS Automotive Performance	Mercedes-Benz							21											0
	(Italy) Ombra Racing	Lamborghini			22			26	41			63	60	45			23			0
	(Czech Republic) Scuderia Praha	Ferrari			Ret			31	Ret			35	25	23						0
	(Austria) Konrad Motorsport	Lamborghini			Ret			24				28	29	30			27			0
	(United Kingdom) Team Parker Racing	Bentley			35			27	32			37	53	54			34			0
	(France) Classic & Modern Racing (Note: At Round 5 cars No. 41 and 42 entered as CMR by Sport Garage, but in the Teams' championship the drivers of cars No. 41 and 42 scored points for Classic & Modern Racing.)	Ferrari							27			51	50	Ret			Ret			0
	(Italy) BMW Team Italia	BMW			Ret			30	30			62	63	Ret			28			0
	(Italy) Antonelli Motorsport	Lamborghini			32				39			33	41	28						0
	(Germany) Team a-workx	Porsche	29	31		35	31			EX	31									0
	(Slovakia) ARC Bratislava	Lamborghini			34			38	31			49	47	39			DNS			0
	(Switzerland) X-Bionic Racing Team	Lamborghini	32	33																0
	(Italy) Easy Race	Ferrari										34	38	38						0
	(Australia) Lago Racing	Lamborghini										50	42	35						0
	(France) CMR by Sport Garage	Ferrari			38			47												0
	(Germany) Car Collection Motorsport	Audi															40			0
	(Portugal) Sports & You	Mercedes-Benz															45			0
Teams ineligible to score points
	(Switzerland) RMS	Porsche										56	52	47						
	(Belgium) SpeedLover	Porsche										58	55	48						
Pos.	Driver	Team	QR	MR	MNZ (Italy)	QR	MR	SIL (United Kingdom)	LEC (France)	QR	MR	6hrs	12hrs	24hrs	QR	MR	NÜR (Germany)	QR	MR	Points
Pos.	Driver	Team	MIS (Italy)		MNZ (Italy)	BRH (United Kingdom)		SIL (United Kingdom)	LEC (France)	NÜR (Germany)		SPA (Belgium)			HUN (Hungary)		NÜR (Germany)	CAT (Spain)		Points

==== Pro-Am Cup ====
Pos.	Team	Manufacturer	MIS (Italy)		MNZ (Italy)	BRH (United Kingdom)		SIL (United Kingdom)	LEC (France)	NÜR (Germany)		SPA (Belgium)			HUN (Hungary)		NÜR (Germany)	CAT (Spain)		Points
Pos.	Team	Manufacturer	QR	MR	MNZ (Italy)	QR	MR	SIL (United Kingdom)	LEC (France)	QR	MR	6hrs	12hrs	24hrs	QR	MR	NÜR (Germany)	QR	MR	Points
1	(Switzerland) Kessel Racing	Ferrari	**23**	13	5	30	23	29	7	**18**	26	23	18	22	24	29	14	**30**	25	250
2	(France) AKKA ASP	Mercedes-Benz	27	24	41	**29**	23	25	18	26	27	16	17	19	**28**	22	42	22	26	174
3	(Germany) Rinaldi Racing/Black Pearl Racing	Ferrari			11	33	26	36	38								5	23	22	90
4	(Czech Republic) ISR	Audi			15			**19**	15			27	9	13			16			89
5	(Italy) AF Corse (Austria) AT Racing	Ferrari			**10**			34	**8**			20	30	46			17			63
6	(Germany) Black Falcon	Mercedes-Benz			18			17	17			41	46	26			21			56
7	(United Kingdom) Oman Racing Team	Aston Martin			13			18	33			14	44	24			**26**			53
8	(United Kingdom) Barwell Motorsport	Lamborghini			24			32	12			25	28	17			24			49
9	(Germany) Team a-workx	Porsche	29	31		35	31			EX	31									45
10	(France) IMSA Performance	Porsche			25			42	23			29	21	10			41			35
11	(Germany) Attempto Racing	Lamborghini/Porsche			23			44	16			15	26	52			47			29
12	(Belgium) Boutsen Ginion	BMW	25	25	39			35	20			59	58	Ret			35			25
13	(Italy) Ombra Racing	Lamborghini			22			26	41			63	60	45			23			24
14	(Czech Republic) Scuderia Praha	Ferrari			Ret			31	Ret			35	25	23						14
15	(United Kingdom) Team Parker Racing	Bentley			35			27	Ret			**37**	62	Ret						9
16	(Austria) Konrad Motorsport	Lamborghini										28	29	30			27			7
17	(United Kingdom) Nissan GT Academy Team RJN	Nissan			30			28	37			39	49	37			31			6
18	(Italy) BMW Team Italia	BMW			Ret			30	30			62	63	Ret			28			3
19	(Italy) Antonelli Motorsport	Lamborghini			32				39			33	41	28						2
20	(France) Saintéloc Racing	Audi			Ret			39	26			57	51	43			44			1
	(Italy) Easy Race	Ferrari										34	38	38						0
	(Australia) Lago Racing	Lamborghini										50	42	35						0
	(Germany) Car Collection Motorsport	Audi															40			0
	(Austria) GRT Grasser Racing Team	Lamborghini										60	54	42						0
	(France) CMR by Sport Garage	Ferrari			Ret															
Pos.	Driver	Team	QR	MR	MNZ (Italy)	QR	MR	SIL (United Kingdom)	LEC (France)	QR	MR	6hrs	12hrs	24hrs	QR	MR	NÜR (Germany)	QR	MR	Points
Pos.	Driver	Team	MIS (Italy)		MNZ (Italy)	BRH (United Kingdom)		SIL (United Kingdom)	LEC (France)	NÜR (Germany)		SPA (Belgium)			HUN (Hungary)		NÜR (Germany)	CAT (Spain)		Points

==== Am Cup ====
Pos.	Team	Manufacturer	MIS (Italy)		MNZ (Italy)	BRH (United Kingdom)		SIL (United Kingdom)	LEC (France)	NÜR (Germany)		SPA (Belgium)			HUN (Hungary)		NÜR (Germany)	CAT (Spain)		Points
Pos.	Team	Manufacturer	QR	MR	MNZ (Italy)	QR	MR	SIL (United Kingdom)	LEC (France)	QR	MR	6hrs	12hrs	24hrs	QR	MR	NÜR (Germany)	QR	MR	Points
1	(Italy) AF Corse/Kaspersky Motorsport	Ferrari	**30**	30	37	**36**	29	41	Ret	**29**	28				**29**	26	**38**	**28**	29	196
2	(Germany) Rinaldi Racing/Black Pearl Racing	Ferrari	28	34	28			33	Ret	32	33	54	45	36	30	27	36	29	30	176
3	(Switzerland) Kessel Racing	Ferrari			Ret			**45**	**22**			**43**	36	32	31	25	43			127
4	(France) AKKA ASP	Mercedes-Benz			27			37	24								19			92
5	(Slovakia) ARC Bratislava	Lamborghini			34			38	31			49	47	39			DNS			67
6	(Switzerland) Spirit of Race	Ferrari			**Ret**			Ret	29			40	37	34			39			65
7	(United Kingdom) Team Parker Racing	Bentley			Ret			40	32			61	53	54			34			54
8	(France) Classic & Modern Racing	Ferrari							27			51	50	Ret			Ret			30
9	(Switzerland) X-Bionic Racing Team	Lamborghini	32	33																22
10	(France) Saintéloc Racing	Audi										53	56	51						18
11	(France) CMR by Sport Garage	Ferrari			38			47												16
12	(Portugal) Sports & You	Mercedes-Benz															45			6
Pos.	Driver	Team	QR	MR	MNZ (Italy)	QR	MR	SIL (United Kingdom)	LEC (France)	QR	MR	6hrs	12hrs	24hrs	QR	MR	NÜR (Germany)	QR	MR	Points
Pos.	Driver	Team	MIS (Italy)		MNZ (Italy)	BRH (United Kingdom)		SIL (United Kingdom)	LEC (France)	NÜR (Germany)		SPA (Belgium)			HUN (Hungary)		NÜR (Germany)	CAT (Spain)		Points

== See also ==
- 2016 Blancpain GT Series Endurance Cup
- 2016 Blancpain GT Series Sprint Cup
