= Matteo Malucelli =

Matteo Malucelli may refer to:

- Matteo Malucelli (racing driver) (born 1984), Italian racing driver
- Matteo Malucelli (cyclist) (born 1993), Italian cyclist
