= 2012 Porsche Carrera Cup Italia =

Motor racing competition

2012 Porsche Carrera Cup Italy

Seasons
- ← 2011 2013 →

The 2012 Porsche Carrera Cup Italia season was the sixth Porsche Carrera Cup Italy season. It began on 5 May in Vallelunga and finished on 21 October in Monza. Vito Postiglione won the championship driving for Ebimotors, which won the teams' championship.

== Teams and drivers ==
Team	No.	Drivers	Class	Rounds
(Italy) Ebimotors	4	(Italy) Vito Postiglione		All
(Italy) Ebimotors	55	(Italy) Giacomo Scanzi	M	All
(Italy) Ebimotors	63	(Italy) Fabrizio Bignotti	M	All
(Italy) Ebimotors	77	(Italy) Luigi Lucchini	M	All
(Italy) Petricorse Motorsport	7	(Italy) Luigi Ferrara		1-3
(Italy) Petricorse Motorsport	7	(Austria) Norbert Siedler		6
(Italy) Petricorse Motorsport	7	(Italy) Massimiliano Busnelli		7
(Italy) Petricorse Motorsport	16	(Italy) Edoardo Piscopo	S	1-5
(Italy) Petricorse Motorsport	30	(Colombia) Camilo Zurcher		1-2
(Italy) Petricorse Motorsport	70	(Italy) Ferdinando Geri	M	5
(Italy) Petricorse Motorsport	78	(Italy) Marco Cassarà	M	3-7
(Italy) Erre Esse Motorsport	11	(Italy) Alessandro Cicognani		5
(Italy) Erre Esse Motorsport	52	(Italy) Angelo Proietti	M	All
(Italy) Erre Esse Motorsport	76	(Italy) Pierluigi Alessandri	M	1-2
(Italy) Erre Esse Motorsport	76	(Italy) Omar Galbiati	M	3-4, 6-7
(San Marino) Tsunami Racing Team	13	(Ukraine) Oleksandr Gaidai		All
(Italy) Antonelli Motorsport	14	(Switzerland) Stefano Comini		7
(Italy) Antonelli Motorsport	15	(Italy) Gianluca Giraudi		All
(Italy) Antonelli Motorsport	27	(Italy) Matteo Malucelli		1-5
(Italy) Antonelli Motorsport	72	(Italy) Alberto Brambati	M	6-7
(Italy) Antonelli Motorsport	84	(Italy) Alberto de Amicis	M	All
(Italy) Cram Motorsport	16	(Italy) Edoardo Piscopo	S	6-7
(Italy) Heaven Motorsport	17	(Italy) Enrico Fulgenzi	S	All
(Italy) Heaven Motorsport	18	(Italy) Stefano Costantini		All
(Italy) Heaven Motorsport	19	(Italy) Walter Ben		All
(Italy) Heaven Motorsport	59	(Italy) Alberto Petrini	M	1-6
(Italy) Mik Corse	23	(Italy) Daniel Mancinelli	S	All
(Italy) Mik Corse	60	(Italy) Giorgio Piccioni	M	1, 3, 7
(Italy) Mik Corse	67	(Italy) Alex de Giacomi	M	All
(Germany) Pole Team	69	(Germany) Günther Blieninger	M	1-5, 7

Icon	Class
M	Michelin Cup
S	Scholarship Programme

== Race calendar and results ==
Round		Circuit	Date	Pole position	Fastest lap	Winning driver	Winning team
1	R1	(Italy) ACI Vallelunga Circuit, Campagnano	5 May	(Italy) Matteo Malucelli	(Italy) Vito Postiglione	(Italy) Vito Postiglione	(Italy) Ebimotors
1	R2	(Italy) ACI Vallelunga Circuit, Campagnano	6 May		(Italy) Daniel Mancinelli	(Italy) Daniel Mancinelli	(Italy) Mik Corse
2	R1	(Italy) Autodromo Internazionale del Mugello, Scarperia	9 June	(Italy) Matteo Malucelli	(Italy) Matteo Malucelli	(Italy) Matteo Malucelli	(Italy) Antonelli Motorsport
2	R2	(Italy) Autodromo Internazionale del Mugello, Scarperia	10 June		(Italy) Luigi Ferrara	(Italy) Edoardo Piscopo	(Italy) Petricorse Motorsport
3	R1	(Italy) Misano World Circuit Marco Simoncelli, Misano Adriatico	7 July	(Italy) Matteo Malucelli	(Italy) Vito Postiglione	(Italy) Vito Postiglione	(Italy) Ebimotors
3	R2	(Italy) Misano World Circuit Marco Simoncelli, Misano Adriatico	8 July		(Italy) Matteo Malucelli	(Italy) Matteo Malucelli	(Italy) Antonelli Motorsport
4	R1	(Austria) Red Bull Ring, Spielberg	4 August	(Italy) Vito Postiglione	(Italy) Vito Postiglione	(Italy) Vito Postiglione	(Italy) Ebimotors
4	R2	(Austria) Red Bull Ring, Spielberg	5 August		(Italy) Vito Postiglione	(Italy) Edoardo Piscopo	(Italy) Petricorse Motorsport
5	R1	(Italy) Autodromo Enzo e Dino Ferrari, Imola	1 September	(Italy) Vito Postiglione	(Italy) Vito Postiglione	(Italy) Vito Postiglione	(Italy) Ebimotors
5	R2	(Italy) Autodromo Enzo e Dino Ferrari, Imola	2 September		(Italy) Vito Postiglione	(Italy) Daniel Mancinelli	(Italy) Mik Corse
6	R1	(Italy) Autodromo Internazionale del Mugello, Scarperia	23 September	(Italy) Vito Postiglione	(Italy) Edoardo Piscopo	(Italy) Edoardo Piscopo	(Italy) Cram Motorsport
6	R2	(Italy) Autodromo Internazionale del Mugello, Scarperia	23 September		(Italy) Enrico Fulgenzi	(Italy) Enrico Fulgenzi	(Italy) Heaven Motorsport
7	R1	(Italy) Autodromo Nazionale Monza, Monza	20 October	(Italy) Daniel Mancinelli	(Italy) Vito Postiglione	(Italy) Enrico Fulgenzi	(Italy) Heaven Motorsport
7	R2	(Italy) Autodromo Nazionale Monza, Monza	21 October		(Italy) Edoardo Piscopo	(Italy) Massimiliano Busnelli	(Italy) Petricorse Motorsport

== Championship standings ==
Points system
	**1st**	**2nd**	**3rd**	**4th**	**5th**	**6th**	**7th**	**8th**	**9th**	**10th**	**Pole**	FL
Race 1	20	15	12	10	8	6	4	3	2	1	2	1
Race 2	15	10	8	6	4	3	2	1				1

=== Drivers' Championship ===
Pos	Driver	VAL (Italy)		MUG (Italy)		MIS (Italy)		RBR (Austria)		IMO (Italy)		MUG (Italy)		MNZ (Italy)		Pts
1	(Italy) Vito Postiglione	1	4	3	4	1	3	**1**	5	**1**	2	**Ret**	Ret	4	3	157
2	(Italy) Daniel Mancinelli	3	1	2	8	Ret	6	3	3	2	1	4	3	**2**	10	132
3	(Italy) Edoardo Piscopo	6	**7**	6	**1**	4	2	6	**1**	5	4	1	2	3	20†	128
4	(Italy) Enrico Fulgenzi	5	2	4	2	7	18	5	4	11	5	2	1	1	4	117
5	(Italy) Matteo Malucelli	**2**	3	**1**	5	**2**	1	2	Ret	3	Ret					112
6	(Italy) Gianluca Giraudi	Ret	12	7	6	6	**4**	4	2	4	3	3	4	7	5	83
7	(Italy) Stefano Costantini	4	5	8	13	5	14	18†	6	6	**Ret**	14†	5	Ret	13	39
8	(Italy) Luigi Ferrara	7	6	5	3	3	Ret									36
9	(Italy) Angelo Proietti	9	9	9	15	8	7	9	10	8	7	5	6	9	7	31
10	(Italy) Massimiliano Busnelli													5	1	23
11	(Switzerland) Stefano Comini													6	**2**	16
12	(Italy) Luigi Lucchini	12	18	17	16	9	8	7	14	7	16†	9	9	12	8	14
13	(Italy) Alberto de Amicis	20†	15	11	9	17	10	10	8	Ret	12	7	16	8	6	12
14	(Italy) Giacomo Scanzi	11	20†	13	12	15	19	8	9	12	8	6	**7**	12	11	12
15	(Ukraine) Oleksandr Gaidai	14	13	12	11	10	5	15	7	17	6	12†	8	19	11	11
16	(Colombia) Camilo Zurcher	8	8	10	7											7
17	(Italy) Alex de Giacomi	10	11	16	10	18†	11	12	11	10	Ret	8	10	14	9	5
18	(Italy) Fabrizio Bignotti	18	16	14	Ret	12	13	11	15	9	9	Ret	12	10	19†	3
19	(Italy) Alberto Brambati											10	11	15	14	1
	(Italy) Alberto Petrini	16	21†	Ret	14	14	9	Ret	Ret	Ret	Ret	Ret	Ret			0
	(Italy) Marco Cassarà					13	16	14	17†	13	10	Ret	13	16	18	0
	(Italy) Giorgio Piccioni	13	10			Ret	15							17	Ret	0
	(Italy) Omar Galbiati					11	Ret	16	13			11	Ret	18	16	0
	(Italy) Alessandro Cicognani									Ret	11					0
	(Germany) Günther Blieninger	15	14	15	18	19†	12	13	12	14	13			13	15	0
	(Italy) Walter Ben	19	19	18†	Ret	16	17	17	16	15	15	13	14	20	17	0
	(Italy) Ferdinando Geri									16	14					0
	(Austria) Norbert Siedler											Ret	15†			0
	(Italy) Pierluigi Alessandri	17	17	Ret	17											0
Pos	Driver	VAL (Italy)		MUG (Italy)		MIS (Italy)		RBR (Austria)		IMO (Italy)		MUG (Italy)		MNZ (Italy)		Pts

Colour	Result
Gold	Winner
Silver	Second place
Bronze	Third place
Green	Points classification
Blue	Non-points classification
Blue	Non-classified finish (NC)
Purple	Retired, not classified (Ret)
Red	Did not qualify (DNQ)
Red	Did not pre-qualify (DNPQ)
Black	Disqualified (DSQ)
White	Did not start (DNS)
White	Withdrew (WD)
White	Race cancelled (C)
Blank	Did not practice (DNP)
Blank	Did not arrive (DNA)
Blank	Excluded (EX)

**Bold** – Pole
Italics – Fastest Lap

† — Drivers did not finish the race, but were classified as they completed over 75% of the race distance.

=== Teams' Championship ===
Pos	Team	VAL (Italy)		MUG (Italy)		MIS (Italy)		RBR (Austria)		IMO (Italy)		MUG (Italy)		MNZ (Italy)		Pts
1	(Italy) Ebimotors	1	4	3	4	1	3	1	5	1	2	Ret	Ret	4	3	150
2	(Italy) Heaven Motorsport	5	2	4	2	7	18	5	4	11	5	2	1	1	4	143
3	(Italy) Antonelli Motorsport	2	3	1	5	2	1	2	Ret	3	Ret	3	4	7	5	140
4	(Italy) Mik Corse	3	1	2	8	Ret	6	3	3	2	1	4	3	2	10	140
5	(Italy) Petricorse Motorsport	7	6	5	3	4	2	6	1	5	4	Ret	15†	5	1	108
6	(Italy) Erre Esse Motorsport	9	9	9	15	8	7	9	10	8	7	5	6	9	7	69
7	(San Marino) Tsunami Racing Team	14	13	12	11	10	5	15	7	17	6	12†	8	19	11	54
8	(Italy) Cram Motorsport											1	2	3	20†	42
9	(Germany) Pole Team	15	14	15	18	19†	12	13	12	14	13			13	15	31
Pos	Team	VAL (Italy)		MUG (Italy)		MIS (Italy)		RBR (Austria)		IMO (Italy)		MUG (Italy)		MNZ (Italy)		Pts

Colour	Result
Gold	Winner
Silver	Second place
Bronze	Third place
Green	Points classification
Blue	Non-points classification
Blue	Non-classified finish (NC)
Purple	Retired, not classified (Ret)
Red	Did not qualify (DNQ)
Red	Did not pre-qualify (DNPQ)
Black	Disqualified (DSQ)
White	Did not start (DNS)
White	Withdrew (WD)
White	Race cancelled (C)
Blank	Did not practice (DNP)
Blank	Did not arrive (DNA)
Blank	Excluded (EX)

**Bold** – Pole
Italics – Fastest Lap

† — Drivers did not finish the race, but were classified as they completed over 75% of the race distance.

=== Michelin Cup ===
The Michelin Cup is the trophy reserved to the gentlemen drivers.

Pos	Driver	Team	Points
1	(Italy) Angelo Proietti	Erre Esse	108
2	(Italy) Alberto de Amicis	Antonelli	60
3	(Italy) Giacomo Scanzi	Ebimotors	49
4	(Italy) Luigi Lucchini	Ebimotors	48
5	(Italy) Alex de Giacomi	Mik Corse	35
6	(Italy) Fabrizio Bignotti	Ebimotors	22
7	(Germany) Günther Blieninger	Pole	11
8	(Italy) Giorgio Piccioni	Mik Corse	8
9	(Italy) Alberto Petrini	Heaven	8
10	(Italy) Marco Cassarà	Petricorse	6
11	(Italy) Omar Galbiati	Erre Esse	5
12	(Italy) Alberto Brambati	Antonelli	4
	(Italy) Ferdinando Geri	Petricorse	0
	(Italy) Pierluigi Alessandri	Erre Esse	0

=== Porsche Carrera Cup Italia Scholarship Programme ===
The Scholarship Programme Cup is the trophy reserved to the under-26 drivers elected by Porsche at the beginning of the season.

Pos	Driver	Team	Points
1	(Italy) Daniel Mancinelli	Mik Corse	132
2	(Italy) Edoardo Piscopo	Petricorse; Cram	128
3	(Italy) Enrico Fulgenzi	Heaven	117
