= Daniel Mancinelli =

Italian racing driver

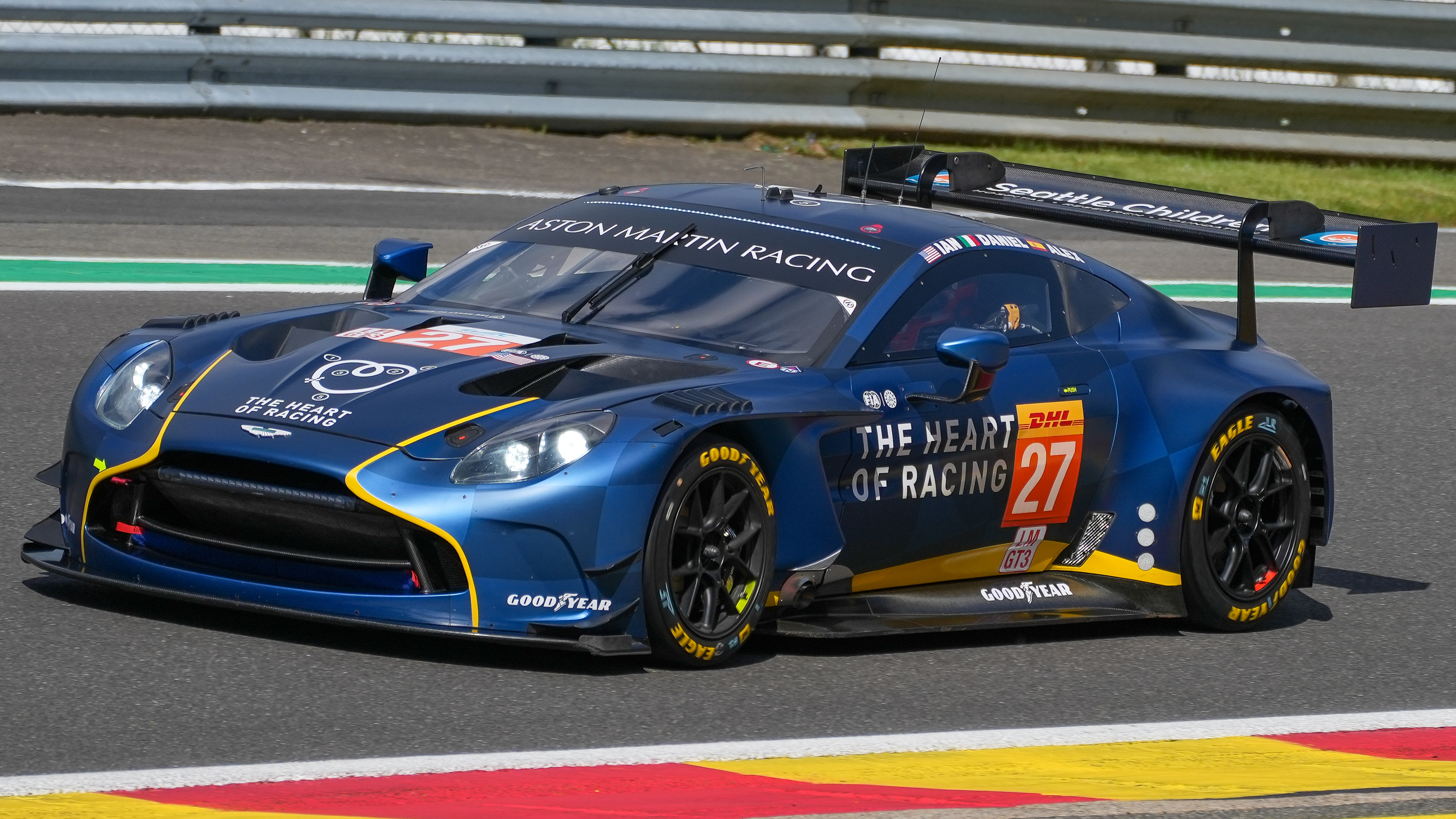
- Nationality: (Italy) Italian
- Born: 23 July 1988 (age 38) San Severino Marche (Italy)
- Relatives: Christian Mancinelli (brother)

Italian Formula Three career
- Debut season: 2008
- Current team: Team Ghinzani
- Categorisation: FIA Gold (until 2016, 2025–); FIA Silver (2017–2024)
- Car number: 8
- Former teams: BVM – Target Racing
- Starts: 12
- Wins: 2
- Poles: 1
- Fastest laps: 2
- Best finish: 13th in 2008

Previous series
- 2009–10 2008 2008 2008 2007–09 2006: Eurocup Formula Renault 2.0; International Formula Master; Porsche Carrera Cup Italy; Italian FR2.0 Winter Series; Italian Formula Renault 2.0; Formula Azzurra

Championship titles
- 2009 2008: Italian Formula Renault 2.0; Italian FR2.0 Winter Series

Daniel Mancinelli (born 23 July 1988, in San Severino Marche) is a professional racing driver from Italy.

== Career ==
=== Karting ===
Mancinelli enjoyed a long karting career prior to stepping up to single-seater racing. In 2003, he finished fourth in the Italian Open Masters ICA Junior class, behind Sébastien Buemi, Stefano Coletti and Miguel Molina. The following year, he finished fourth in the European Championship ICA class and fifth in the Italian Open Masters ICA. 2005 saw Mancinelli finish fourth in the same competition, one place behind Jaime Alguersuari.

In 2007, Mancinelli won the Copa Campeones Trophy ICA class, whilst also taking top three positions in the South Garda Winter Cup ICA and Italian Open Masters ICA.

=== Formula Azzurra ===
Mancinelli began his Formula Racing career in 2006, driving in the Italian Formula Azzurra series. He secured one podium position in his four races, although he was unclassified in the final standings.

=== Formula Renault ===
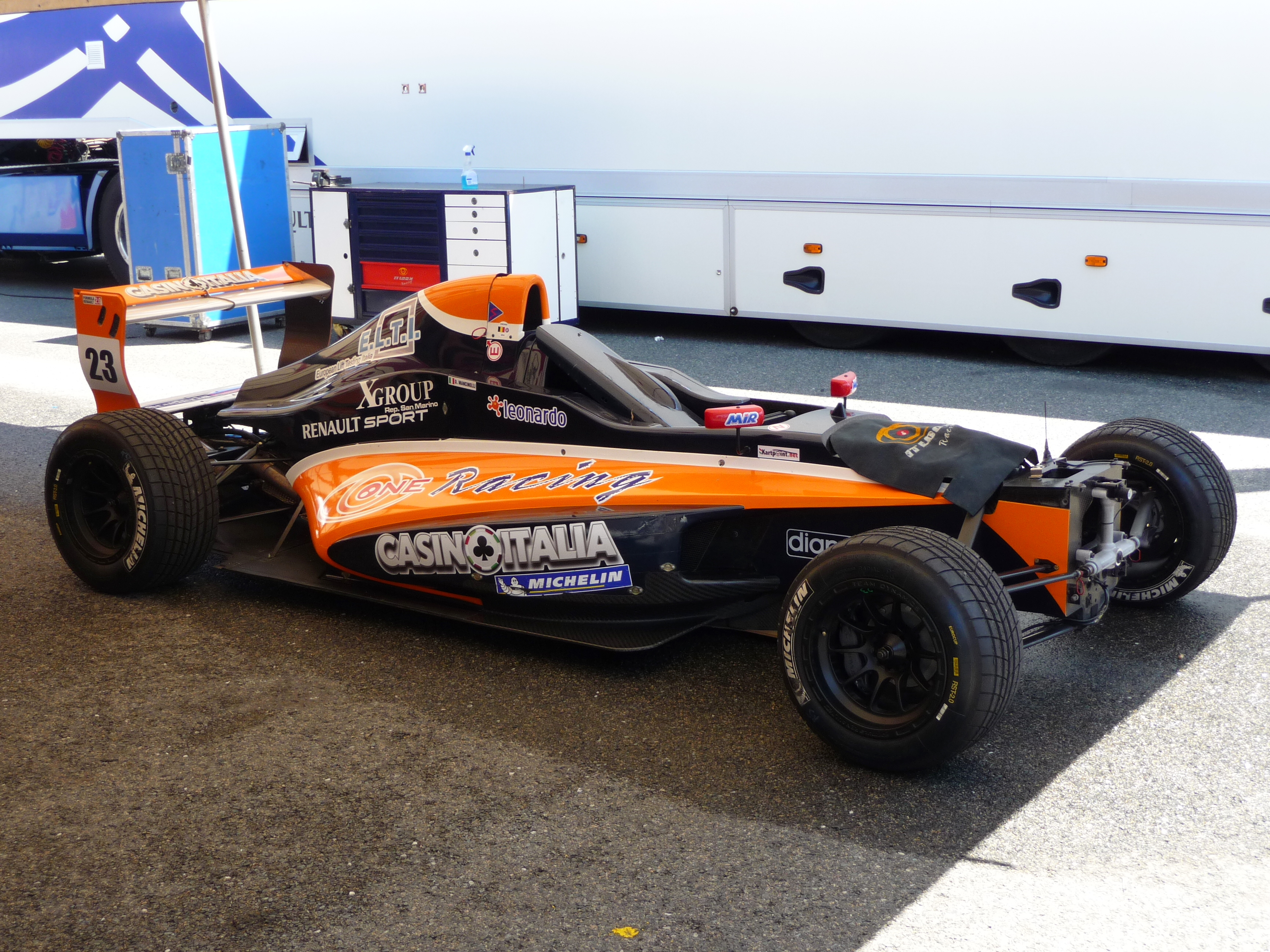
Daniel Mancinelli's car

In 2007, Mancinelli moved up to race in the Italian Formula Renault 2.0 Championship with CO2 Motorsport. In his first season in the category, he scored 78 points to finish in sixteenth place. Mancinelli remained in the series the following year, although he only took part in the final six races of the season. He finished fifteenth in the championship after taking two podium places, including his first win at Mugello.

In November 2008, Mancinelli took part in the Italian Formula Renault 2.0 Winter Series, which was contested over two races at the Imola circuit. He won the first race and finished fifth in the second event to take the title ahead of Kazim Vasiliauskas.

Mancinelli stayed in the main championship for a third season in 2009, joining the One Racing team. After securing six race wins, he comfortably won the title at Mugello with a round to spare.

Mancinelli also took part in eight races of the 2009 Eurocup Formula Renault 2.0 season, taking a best result of sixth at the opening round in Barcelona to be classified in nineteenth place in the final standings. He returned to the Eurocup at the 2010 season-opening round at Ciudad del Motor de Aragón, finishing the races in seventh and ninth places.

=== International Formula Master ===
For 2008, Mancinelli stepped up to the International Formula Master series. He began the season with Euronova Racing, but switched to the Scuderia Famà team after the fourth round of the season at Estoril. He took his maiden podium finish in the fifth round at Brands Hatch and eventually finished the year in thirteenth place.

=== Formula Three ===
In October 2008, Mancinelli made his Formula Three debut, racing for the BVM - Target Racing team in the final round of the Italian Formula Three season at Vallelunga. He finished the first race in sixth place before taking third in race two, behind Francesco Castellacci and series champion Mirko Bortolotti. He scored enough points in the two races to be classified thirteenth in the standings. He will return to the series in 2010, partnering Vittorio Ghirelli at Team Ghinzani.

=== Other Series ===
In 2008, Mancinelli also competed in two races of the Porsche Carrera Cup Italy, taking a podium position at Spa-Francorchamps.

In October 2009, Mancinelli tested a Formula Renault 3.5 Series car at Motorland Aragón for newly crowned team champions Draco Racing. He completed a total of 62 laps during the test, recording a best time of 1:44.027 on the second day of running.

== Racing record ==
=== Career summary ===
Season	Series	Team	Races	Wins	Poles	F/Laps	Podiums	Points	Position
2006	Formula Azzurra	CO2 Motorsport	4	0	0	0	1	?	NC
2007	Italian Formula Renault 2.0	CO2 Motorsport	14	0	0	0	0	78	16th
2008	International Formula Master	Euronova Racing	12	0	0	0	1	13	13th
2008	International Formula Master	Scuderia Famà	12	0	0	0	1	13	13th
2008	Italian Formula Renault 2.0	Paragon Motorsports	6	1	0	0	1	66	15th
2008	Italian Formula Three Championship	BVM – Target Racing	2	0	0	0	1	9	13th
2008	Porsche Carrera Cup Italy	GDL Racing	2	0	0	1	1	13	15th
2008	Italian Formula Renault 2.0 – Winter Series	IT Loox Racing Car	2	1	1	1	1	58	**1st**
2009	Italian Formula Renault 2.0	One Racing	14	6	6	7	10	353	**1st**
2009	Eurocup Formula Renault 2.0	One Racing	8	0	0	0	0	9	19th
2010	Italian Formula Three Championship	Team Ghinzani	16	2	1	2	7	138	4th
2010	Eurocup Formula Renault 2.0	One Racing	4	0	0	0	0	14	17th
2011	Italian Formula Three Championship	RP Motorsport	8	1	0	0	1	30	11th
2011	GP3 Series	RSC Mücke Motorsport	4	0	0	0	0	0	35th
2012	Porsche Carrera Cup Italia	Mik Corse	14	2	1	1	9	132	**2nd**
2013	Ferrari Challenge Europe - Trofeo Pirelli	Motor Piacenza	10	3	3	3	6	161	**2nd**
2015	Italian GT Championship - GT3	Racing Studios	6	0	1	1	0	5	42nd
2015	Italian GT Championship - GT Cup	?	2	0	0	0	0	12	28th
2015	Vallelunga 6 Hours	AS Sport Service	1	0	0	0	0	N/A	6th
2016	Italian GT Championship - SuperGT3	Easy Race	9	0	1	3	1	42	12th
2016	Italian GT Championship - GT3	Easy Race	2	0	0	1	0	13	13th
2016	Ferrari Challenge North America - Trofeo Pirelli	The Collection	4	3	3	3	3	74	6th
2016	24H Series - SPX	Vincenzo Sospiri Racing							
2017	Pirelli World Challenge - GT	TR3 Racing	19	3	3	3	5	291	4th
2018	Pirelli World Challenge - GT Sprint	TR3 Racing	7	1	1	0	4	124	6th
2018	Italian GT Championship - GT3	Easy Race	12	1	2	1	4	89	8th
2019	Italian GT Championship - GT3	Easy Race	2	0	0	1	1	20	10th
2019	Italian GT Championship - GT4	Ebimotors	1	0	0	0	0	0	NC
2019	Le Mans Cup - GT3	Ebimotors	1	0	0	0	0	10	13th
2020	Italian GT Sprint Championship - GT3	Audi Sport Italia	2	1	0	0	2	32	11th
2020	Italian GT Endurance Championship - GT3	Audi Sport Italia	4	1	1	0	2	39	**2nd**
2021	Italian GT Sprint Championship - GT3	Audi Sport Italia	8	1	0	0	3	54	4th
2021	Italian GT Endurance Championship - GT3	Easy Race	2	0	0	0	0	0	NC
2021	Lamborghini Super Trofeo North America - Pro	TR3 Racing	2	0	0	0	0	9	12th
2021	IMSA SportsCar Championship - GTD	Scuderia Corsa	1	0	0	0	0	224	60th
2022	Intercontinental GT Challenge	Conquest Racing	1	0	0	0	0	0	NC
2023	FIA World Endurance Championship - LMGTE Am	Northwest AMR	4	0	0	0	1	51	9th
2023	24 Hours of Le Mans - LMGTE Am	Northwest AMR	1	0	0	0	0	N/A	6th
2023-24	Middle East Trophy - GT3	Heart of Racing by SPS							
2024	FIA World Endurance Championship - LMGT3	Heart of Racing Team	8	1	1	0	3	83	5th
2026	Italian GT Championship Endurance Cup - GT3	Easy Race	3	0	0	0	0	0	NC

* Season still in progress

=== Complete Eurocup Formula Renault 2.0 results ===
(key) (Races in bold indicate pole position; races in italics indicate fastest lap)

Year	Entrant	1	2	3	4	5	6	7	8	9	10	11	12	13	14	15	16	DC	Points
2009	One Racing	CAT; 1; 7	CAT; 2; 6	SPA; 1; 13	SPA; 2; 20	HUN; 1 Ret	HUN; 2 Ret	SIL; 1	SIL; 2	LMS; 1; 15	LMS; 2 NC	NÜR; 1	NÜR; 2	ALC; 1	ALC; 2			19th	9
2010	One Racing	ALC; 1; 7	ALC; 2; 9	SPA; 1; 4	SPA; 2; 11	BRN; 1	BRN; 2	MAG; 1	MAG; 2	HUN; 1	HUN; 2	HOC; 1	HOC; 2	SIL; 1	SIL; 2	CAT; 1	CAT; 2	17th	14

=== Complete GP3 Series results ===
(key) (Races in bold indicate pole position) (Races in italics indicate fastest lap)

Year	Entrant	1	2	3	4	5	6	7	8	9	10	11	12	13	14	15	16	DC	Points
2011	RSC Mücke Motorsport	IST; FEA	IST; SPR	CAT; FEA	CAT; SPR	VAL; FEA	VAL; SPR	SIL; FEA	SIL; SPR	NÜR; FEA	NÜR; SPR	HUN; FEA	HUN; SPR	SPA; FEA; Ret	SPA; SPR; 17	MNZ; FEA; 15	MNZ; SPR; 15	35th	0

=== Complete Porsche Carrera Cup Italia results ===
(key) (Races in bold indicate pole position) (Races in italics indicate fastest lap)

Year	Team	1	2	3	4	5	6	7	8	9	10	11	12	13	14	Pos.	Points
2012	Mik Corse	VLL; 1; 3	VLL; 2; 1	MUG1; 1; 2	MUG1; 2; 8	MIS; 1 Ret	MIS; 2; 6	RBR; 1; 3	RBR; 2; 3	IMO; 1; 2	IMO; 2; 1	MUG2; 1; 4	MUG2; 2; 3	**MNZ2**; **1**; 2	MNZ2; 2; 10	2nd	132

=== Complete FIA World Endurance Championship results ===
Year	Entrant	Class	Car	Engine	1	2	3	4	5	6	7	8	Rank	Points
2023	Northwest AMR	GTE Am	Aston Martin Vantage AMR	Aston Martin M177 4.0 L Turbo V8	SEB	PRT	SPA; 7	LMS; 6	MNZ	FUJ; 7	BHR; 3		9th	51
2024	Heart of Racing Team	LMGT3	Aston Martin Vantage AMR GT3 Evo	Aston Martin 4.0 L Turbo V8	QAT; 2	IMO; 5	SPA; 11	LMS; Ret	SÃO; 2	**COA**; 1	FUJ; 9	BHR; 11	5th	83

* Season still in progress

=== 24 Hours of Le Mans results ===
Year	Team	Co-Drivers	Car	Class	Laps	Pos.	Class Pos.
2023	(Canada) Northwest AMR	(United Kingdom) Ian James (Spain) Alex Riberas	Aston Martin Vantage AMR	GTE; Am	310	33rd	6th
2024	(United States) Heart of Racing Team	(United Kingdom) Ian James (Spain) Alex Riberas	Aston Martin Vantage AMR GT3 Evo	LMGT3	196	DNF	DNF

Sporting positions
Preceded by César Ramos	Italian Formula Renault 2.0; Winter Series; Champion; 2008	Succeeded by Series Discontinued
Preceded by Pål Varhaug	Italian Formula Renault 2.0; Champion; 2009	Succeeded by Francesco Frisone
