= Stefano Costantini =

Italian racing driver (born 1983)

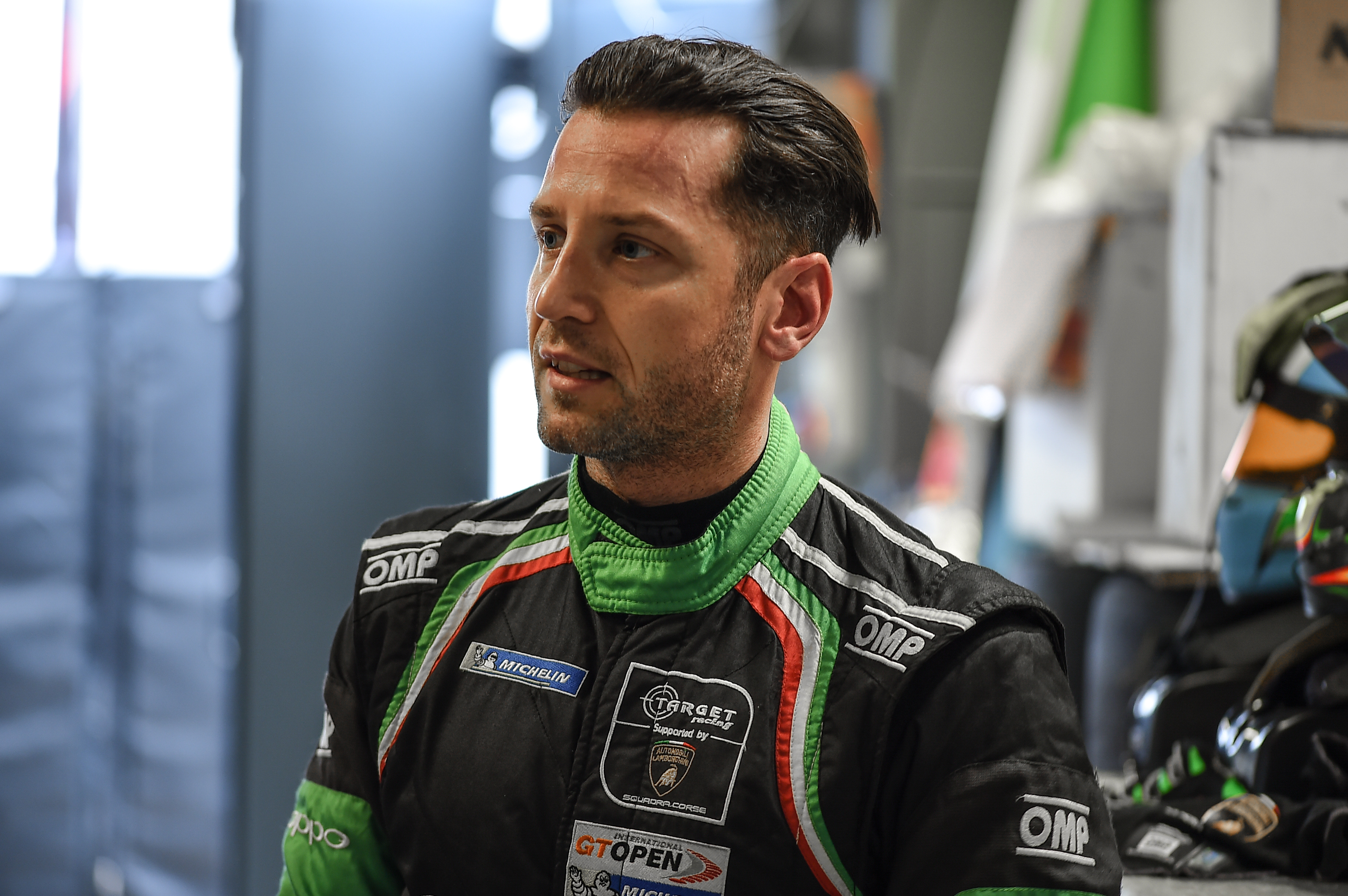
- Nationality: (Italy) Italian
- Born: 24 May 1983 (age 43) Rome, Italy

FIA World Endurance Championship career
- Debut season: 2023
- Current team: AF Corse
- Categorisation: FIA Bronze
- Car number: 21
- Starts: 0 (0 entries)
- Wins: 0
- Podiums: 0
- Poles: 0
- Fastest laps: 0
- Best finish: TBD (LMGTE Am) in 2023

Championship titles
- 2022: GTWCE Endurance Cup - Pro-Am

Stefano Costantini (born 24 May 1983) is an Italian amateur racing driver currently competing in the FIA World Endurance Championship with AF Corse. He is the reigning champion of the GT World Challenge Europe Endurance Cup in the Pro-Am class.

== Racing record ==
=== Racing career summary ===
Season	Series	Team	Races	Wins	Poles	F/Laps	Podiums	Points	Position
2009	Italian Touring Endurance Championship - Overall	Starteam	6	0	0	0	0	9	23rd
2011	Porsche Carrera Cup Italia	AB Racing Team	12	0	0	0	0	9	15th
2012	Porsche Carrera Cup Italia	Heaven Motorsport	14	0	0	0	0	38	7th
2013	International GT Open - GTS	Ombra	16	0	0	0	2	28	13th
2013	International GTSprint Series	Ombra	2	0	0	0	0	7	33rd
2014	International GT Open - GTS	Ombra Racing	10	1	0	0	4	33	9th
2014	Italian GT Championship - GT3	Ombra Racing	2	1	0	0	1	20	25th
2015	Renault Sport Trophy - Prestige	V8 Racing	3	0	0	0	0	40	7th
2015	Renault Sport Trophy - Endurance	V8 Racing	3	0	0	0	0	1	22nd
2015	Italian GT Championship - GT3	Solaris Motorsport	4	0	0	0	0	2	49th
2015	International GT Open - Pro-Am	Solaris Motorsport	2	0	0	0	0	0	20th
2016	Blancpain GT Series Endurance Cup	Ombra Racing	4	0	0	0	0	0	NC
2017	Blancpain GT Series Endurance Cup	Raton Racing	3	0	0	0	0	0	NC
2017	Blancpain GT Series Endurance Cup - Pro-Am	Raton Racing	3	0	0	0	0	12	31st
2018	International GT Open	Target Racing	12	0	0	0	0	4	38th
2018	International GT Open - Pro-Am	Target Racing	8	0	0	0	1	21	10th
2018	International GT Open - Am	Target Racing	4	2	1	1	3	18	10th
2018	Blancpain GT Series Endurance Cup	Target Racing	1	0	0	0	0	0	NC
2018	Blancpain GT Series Endurance Cup - Am	Target Racing	1	0	0	0	1	34	15th
2019	Blancpain GT Series Endurance Cup	Raton Racing by Target	5	0	0	0	0	0	NC
2019	Blancpain GT Series Endurance Cup - Am	Raton Racing by Target	5	1	0	0	3	92	**3rd**
2019	Lamborghini Super Trofeo Europe - Am	Imperiale Racing	1	0	0	0	0	0	NC
2019	24H GT Series - European Championship - A6	GRT Grasser Racing Team	2	0	0	0	1	0	NC†
2019	24H GT Series - Continents'	Target Racing	1	0	0	0	0	0	NC
2020	GT World Challenge Europe Endurance Cup	Raton Racing	1	0	0	0	0	0	NC
2020	GT World Challenge Europe Endurance Cup - Am	Raton Racing	1	0	0	0	0	22	10th
2021	GT World Challenge Europe Endurance Cup	Orange 1 FFF Racing Team	3	0	0	0	0	0	NC
2021	GT World Challenge Europe Endurance Cup - Pro-Am	Orange 1 FFF Racing Team	3	1	0	0	1	32	15th
2021	Intercontinental GT Challenge	Orange 1 FFF Racing Team	1	0	0	0	0	0	NC
2022	GT World Challenge Europe Endurance Cup	AF Corse	5	0	0	0	0	0	NC
2022	GT World Challenge Europe Endurance Cup - Pro-Am	AF Corse	5	2	0	0	5	118	**1st**
2022	GT World Challenge Europe Sprint Cup	AF Corse	2	0	0	0	0	0	NC
2022	GT World Challenge Europe Sprint Cup - Pro-Am	AF Corse	2	1	0	0	2	26	6th
2023	Asian Le Mans Series - GT	AF Corse	4	0	0	0	1	23	7th
2023	FIA World Endurance Championship - LMGTE Am	AF Corse	1	0	0	0	0	18*	9th*
2023	Italian GT Championship - GT Cup	Centro Porsche Ticino							
2023	Intercontinental GT Challenge	Car Collection Motorsport							
2024	GT2 European Series - Pro-Am	LP Racing	2	0	0	0	0	6	16th
2024	Italian GT Endurance Championship - Pro-Am	Vincenzo Sospiri Racing	1	0	0	1	1	22	NC
2026	GT Winter Series - GT3	Norik Racing							
2026	GT World Challenge Europe Endurance Cup	Ziggo Sport – Tempesta Racing	1	0	0	0	0	0	NC

^{†} As Costantini was a guest driver, he was ineligible to score points.^{*} Season still in progress.

=== Complete GT World Challenge Europe results ===
==== GT World Challenge Europe Endurance Cup ====
(key) (Races in bold indicate pole position) (Races in italics indicate fastest lap)

Year	Team	Car	Class	1	2	3	4	5	6	7	Pos.	Points
2016	Ombra Racing	Lamborghini Huracán GT3	Pro-Am	MNZ; 22	SIL; 26	LEC; 41	SPA; 6H; 63	SPA; 24H; 60	SPA; 12H; 45	CAT	28th	16
2017	Raton Racing	Lamborghini Huracán GT3	Pro-Am	MNZ; 20	SIL; 27	LEC; 37	SPA; 6H	SPA; 12H	SPA; 24H	CAT	33rd	12
2018	Target Racing	Lamborghini Huracán GT3	Am	MNZ	SIL	LEC	SPA; 6H; 38	SPA; 12H; 40	SPA; 24H; 30	CAT	15th	34
2019	Raton Racing by Target	Lamborghini Huracán GT3 Evo	Am	MNZ; 28	SIL; 34	LEC; 35	SPA; 6H; 46	SPA; 12H; 39	SPA; 24H; 36	CAT; 20	3rd	92
2020	Raton Racing	Lamborghini Huracán GT3 Evo	Am	IMO	NÜR	SPA; 6H; 43	SPA; 12H; 40	**SPA**; **24H**; Ret	LEC		10th	22
2021	Orange 1 FFF Racing Team	Lamborghini Huracán GT3 Evo	Pro-Am	MNZ	LEC	SPA; 6H; 35	SPA; 12H; Ret	SPA; 24H; Ret	NÜR; 20	CAT; 35	15th	32
2022	AF Corse	Ferrari 488 GT3 Evo 2020	Pro-Am	**IMO**; 33	LEC; 26	SPA; 6H; 35	SPA; 12H; 29	**SPA**; **24H**; 20	HOC; 30	CAT; 39	1st	118
2026	Ziggo Sport - Tempesta Racing	Porsche 911 GT3 R (992.2)	Bronze	LEC; 49†	MNZ	SPA; 6H	SPA; 12H	SPA; 24H	NÜR	ALG	NC	0

==== GT World Challenge Europe Sprint Cup ====
(key) (Races in bold indicate pole position) (Races in italics indicate fastest lap)

Year	Team	Car	Class	1	2	3	4	5	6	7	8	9	10	Pos.	Points
2022	AF Corse	Ferrari 488 GT3 Evo 2020	Pro-Am	BRH; 1	BRH; 2	MAG; 1	MAG; 2	ZAN; 1; 15	ZAN; 2; 21	MIS; 1	MIS; 2	VAL; 1	VAL; 2	6th	26

=== Complete Asian Le Mans Series results ===
(key) (Races in bold indicate pole position) (Races in italics indicate fastest lap)

Year	Team	Class	Car	Engine	1	2	3	4	Pos.	Points
2023	AF Corse	GT	Ferrari 488 GT3 Evo 2020	Ferrari F154CB 3.9 L Turbo V8	DUB; 1; 9	DUB; 2; 3	ABU; 1 Ret	ABU; 2; 7	7th	23

=== Complete FIA World Endurance Championship results ===
(key) (Races in bold indicate pole position) (Races in italics indicate fastest lap)

Year	Entrant	Class	Car	Engine	1	2	3	4	5	6	7	Rank	Points
2023	AF Corse	LMGTE Am	Ferrari 488 GTE Evo	Ferrari F154CB 3.9 L Turbo V8	SEB; 4	PRT	SPA	LMS	MNZ	FUJ	BHR	9th*	18*

== Endorsement Partnerships ==
In 2022, Costantini entered into an endorsement agreement with Bianchet and won both the GT World Challenge Europe Endurance Cup, and the 24-hours of SPA GT Pro-Am race. Costantini and Bianchet renewed their partnership in 2023 and collaborated during the Asian Le Mans Series, the WEC, and the 12h of Gulf.
