= Matteo Malucelli (racing driver) =

Italian racing driver (born 1984)

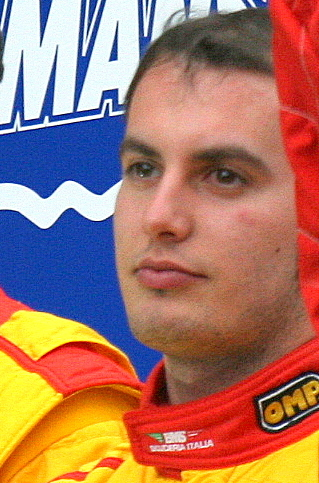
- Malucelli during the 2008 24 Hours of Le Mans
- Nationality: (Italy) Italian
- Born: 27 October 1984 (age 42) Forlì, Italy
- Categorisation: FIA Gold

Championship titles
- 2019 2005 2004: 24H GT Series – A6-Pro; Italian GT Championship – GT1; Ferrari Challenge Italy – Trofeo Pirelli

Matteo Malucelli (born 27 October 1984) is an Italian racing driver who last competed in 24H Series Middle East for Scuderia Praha.

== Personal life ==
Malucelli is the son of Sandro Malucelli, who founded Team Malucelli in 1994.

== Career ==
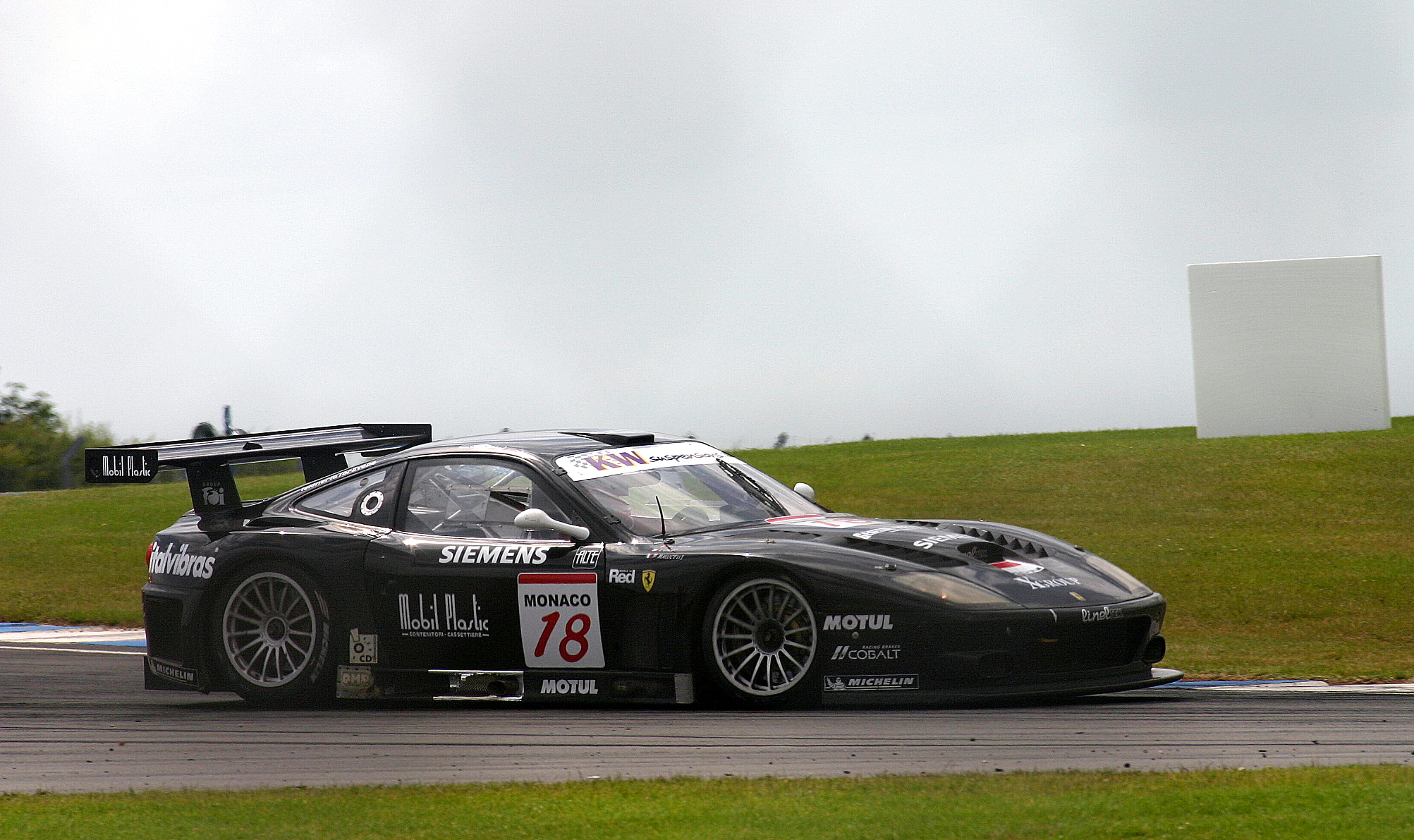
Malucelli racing a JMB Racing Ferrari at FIA GT's Donington round of 2004.

Malucelli began racing single-seaters in 2001, competing for Scuderia Veregra in Formula Renault 2000 Italia. After racing in the series in 2002, Malucelli transitioned to sportscars for the following year by racing in Ferrari Challenge Italy for his family team. Remaining in sportscars for 2004, Malucelli joined JMB Racing for a part-time campaign in both the Italian GT Championship and the FIA GT Championship, in which he most notably won both races at Misano in the former. That year, Malucelli also won the Ferrari Challenge Italy title in the Trofeo Pirelli class.

Switching to BMS Scuderia Italia for 2005, Malucelli primarily raced in Italian GT, winning five races and standing on the podium in all but one race to take the GT1 title, whilst also racing for the team at the 24 Hours of Le Mans and the 1000 km of Silverstone. After a part-time campaign with the team in the GT1 class of the 2006 FIA GT Championship, in which he scored a third-place finish at the Hungaroring, Malucelli returned to BMS Scuderia Italia to race in the GT2 class of the following year's FIA GT Championship. In his rookie year in GT2, Malucelli won the Spa 24 Hours and took four more podiums to end the year third in points. That year, Malucelli also returned to the 24 Hours of Le Mans with the same team, racing in the GT1 class alongside Fabio Babini and Jamie Davies.

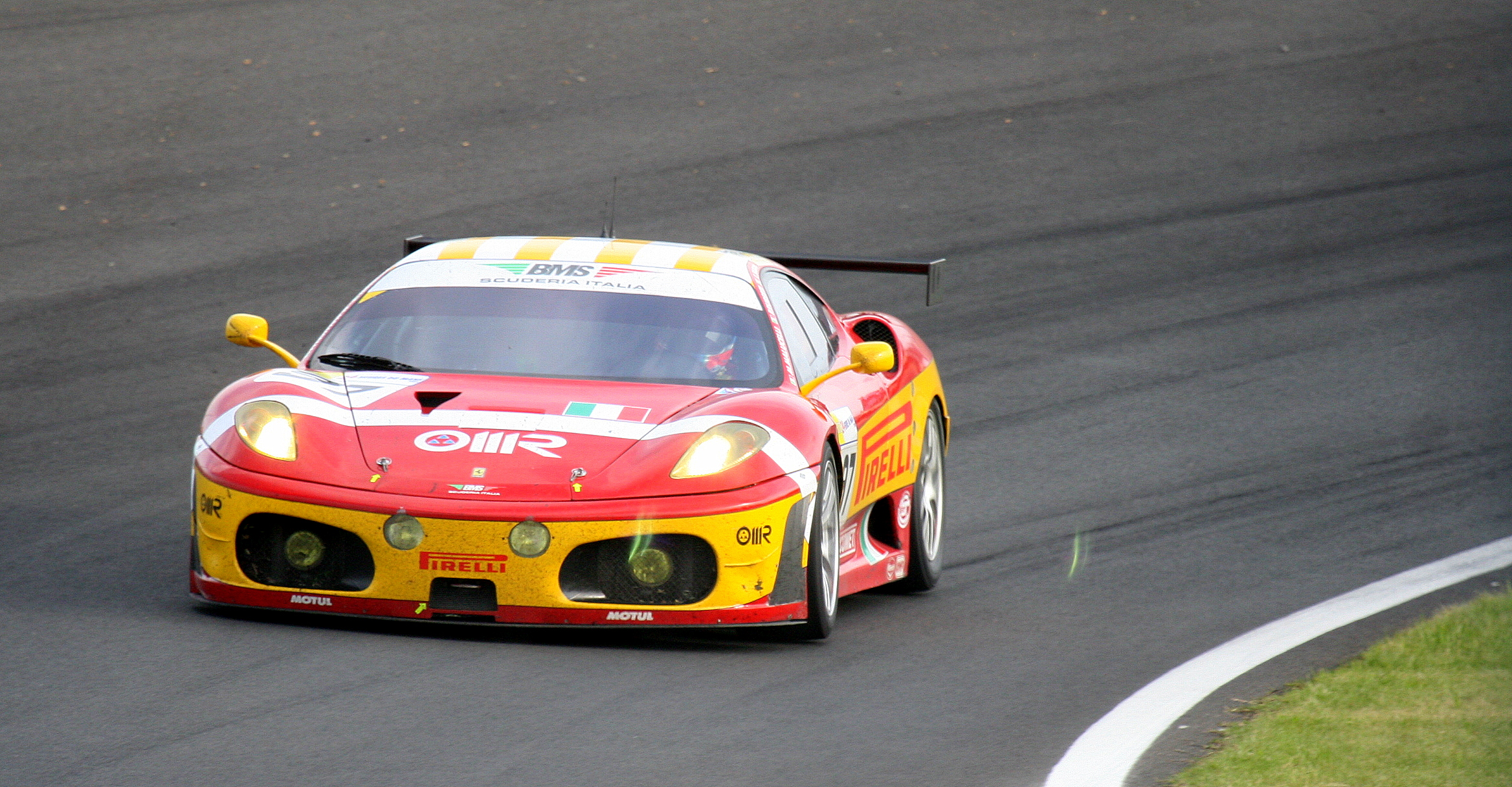
The BMS Scuderia Italia Ferrari that Malucelli drove at the 2009 24 Hours of Le Mans.

Returning to BMS Scuderia Italia for his sophomore season in the GT2 class of the FIA GT Championship in 2008, Malucelli won the 24 Hours of Spa and took four more podiums to end the year runner-up in the GT2 class. In 2008, Malucelli also raced at the 24 Hours of Le Mans with the same team, finishing second in the GT2 class. Staying with BMS Scuderia Italia for a similar program in 2009, Malucelli took three podiums to finish seventh in the GT2 points, and also secured a second-place finish at the 24 Hours of Le Mans in the GT2 class.

Following a part-time season in the Superstars Series in which he won at Vallelunga, Malucelli joined Scuderia Baldini to race in the GTC class of the Italian GT Championship. Racing in all but one rounds, Malucelli won at Magione and Mugello to take seventh in the class standings. During 2011, Malucelli also competed in Ferrari Challenge Italy for his family team, winning all six races he partook in, as well as participating in the Ferrari Challenge Finali Mondiali.

Moving to Villois Racing to race in International GT Open in 2012, Malucelli took five wins to end the year third in points alongside Álvaro Barba. During 2012, Malucelli also raced in all but two rounds of Porsche Carrera Cup Italy, in which he won at Mugello and Misano and took five more podiums to secure fifth in points. The following year, Malucelli joined Risi Competizione to race in the GT class of the American Le Mans Series, taking a lone win at VIR and standing on the podium twice more to end the season eighth in points. During 2013, Malucelli also raced part-time in the FIA World Endurance Championship for 8 Star Motorsports in LMGTE Am and AF Corse in LMGTE Pro, most notably taking a class win for the former at Spa on his series debut.

In 2014, Malucelli remained with Risi Competizione to drive in the United SportsCar Championship alongside Giancarlo Fisichella. At the 24 Hours of Daytona, Malucelli was involved in a serious crash with Memo Gidley, after which he spent a night in hospital—Gidley broke his back, left arm and left leg, underwent eight surgeries and did not race again until 2017. In the following race at Sebring, Malucelli was involved in another crash, which gave him a one-race suspension and put him on probation for the rest of the year. Malucelli then left the team and only competed in select rounds of the Italian GT Championship for Team Malucelli.

After racing part-time in the 24H Series and the Italian GT Championship in 2015, most notably winning the 12 Hours of Brno in the former, Malucelli joined Scuderia Praha to race in the Blancpain GT Series Endurance Cup, in which he finished 29th in the Pro-Am class in his only full-time season in the series. During 2016, Malucelli also raced in the 24 Hours of Le Mans for Risi Competizione, finishing second in the LMGTE Pro class in his sixth appearance at the event.

The following year, Malucelli returned to Scuderia Baldini to race in the Italian GT Championship in the Super GT3 Pro class, winning at Monza and Mugello to end the year fifth in the class points. In 2018, Malucelli returned to Scuderia Praha to race in the 24H GT Series, scoring overall wins at Navarra, Algarve and Spa to take third in the A6-Pro standings. Returning to Scuderia Praha and the 24H GT Series the following year, Malucelli won four races and stood on the podium in every race he started to secure the A6-Pro title with a race to spare.

After one-off appearances in the 24H GT Series and the Italian GT Championship in 2020 and not racing in 2021, Malucelli returned to his family's team to compete in the 2022 Porsche Carrera Cup Italy season. On his return to full-time racing, Malucelli scored wins at Misano and Mugello as well as taking two more podiums to end the year eighth in points despite missing one round. Returning to the team for 2023, Malucelli won at Mugello and took two more podiums to once again end the season eighth in points. In 2023, Malucelli also tested the Isotta Fraschini Tipo 6 LMH-C at MotorLand Aragón. Three years later, Malucelli made his brief return to racing, competing in the Dubai 24 Hour for Scuderia Praha.

== Karting record ==
=== Karting career summary ===
Season	Series	Team	Position
1998	Andrea Margutti Trophy – 100 Junior		10th
1998	Trofeo Delle Industrie – 100 Junior		10th

== Racing record ==
=== Racing career summary ===
Season	Series	Team	Races	Wins	Poles	F/Laps	Podiums	Points	Position
2001	Formula Renault 2000 Italia	Scuderia Veregra	8	0	0	0	0	2	30th
2002	Formula Renault 2000 Italia	BVM Minardi Jnr.	5	0	0	0	0	12	19th
2003	Ferrari Challenge Italy	Team Malucelli							**2nd**
2004	Italian GT Championship – GT	JMB Racing	4	2	1	3	3	55	13th
2004	FIA GT Championship – GT	JMB Racing	2	0	0	0	0	0	NC
2004	Ferrari Challenge Italy – Trofeo Pirelli								**1st**
2004	Ferrari Challenge Finali Mondiali – Trofeo Pirelli								**2nd**
2005	Italian GT Championship – GT1	BMS Scuderia Italia	14	5	4	7	13	223	**1st**
2005	Le Mans Endurance Series – LMGT1	BMS Scuderia Italia	1	0	0	0	0	4	19th
2005	24 Hours of Le Mans – GT1	BMS Scuderia Italia	1	0	0	0	0	—N/a	DNF
2005	Ferrari Challenge Italy – Trofeo Pirelli							25	21st
2006	FIA GT Championship – GT1	BMS Scuderia Italia	4	0	0	0	1	12.5	18th
2007	FIA GT Championship – GT2	BMS Scuderia Italia	10	1	0	0	5	64	**3rd**
2007	24 Hours of Le Mans – GT1	Aston Martin Racing BMS	1	0	0	0	0	—N/a	6th
2008	FIA GT Championship – GT2	BMS Scuderia Italia	11	1	0	0	5	60.5	**2nd**
2008	24 Hours of Le Mans – GT2	BMS Scuderia Italia	1	0	0	0	1	—N/a	**2nd**
2009	FIA GT Championship – GT2	BMS Scuderia Italia	8	0	0	0	3	27	7th
2009	24 Hours of Le Mans – GT2	BMS Scuderia Italia	1	0	0	0	1	—N/a	**2nd**
2010	Campionato Italiano Superstars	Motorzone Race Car	4	1	0	1	2	39	10th
2011	Italian GT Championship – GTC	Scuderia Baldini 27 Mode	12	3	0	3	7	142	7th
2011	International GT Open – Pro-Am	Villois Racing	2	0	0	0	1	8	21st
2012	International GT Open – Super GT	Villois Racing	15	5	4	2	6	76	**3rd**
2012	Porsche Carrera Cup Italia	Antonelli Motorsport	10	2	3	2	7	112	5th
2012	Italian GT Championship – GT3	Antonelli Motorsport	4	1	0	1	1	37	17th
2012	International GTSprint Series – Cup	Scuderia Baldini 27 Network	2	1	0	0	2	37	10th
2013	American Le Mans Series – GT	Risi Competizione	9	1	2	1	3	73	8th
2013	FIA World Endurance Championship – LMGTE Am	8 Star Motorsports	2	1	0	0	1	38	15th
2013	FIA World Endurance Championship – GT	AF Corse; 8 Star Motorsports	3	0	0	0	0	30	18th
2013	24 Hours of Le Mans – LMGTE Pro	AF Corse	1	0	0	0	0	—N/a	6th
2013	Blancpain Endurance Series – Pro-Am	Team Ukraine	1	0	0	0	0	0	NC
2014	United SportsCar Championship – GTLM	Risi Competizione	2	0	0	0	0	22	36th
2014	Italian GT Championship – GT3	Team Malucelli	4	0	0	0	1	19	26th
2015	24H Series – A6	Scuderia Praha	4	1	1	2	1	93	4th
2015	Italian GT Championship – GT3	Scuderia Baldini 27 Network	4	2	0	0	2	45	17th
2016	24H Series – A6 Pro	Scuderia Praha	3	0	0	0	0	21	10th
2016	Blancpain GT Series Endurance Cup – Pro-Am	Scuderia Praha	4	0	0	0	0	14	29th
2016	24 Hours of Le Mans – LMGTE Pro	Risi Competizione	1	0	0	0	1	—N/a	**2nd**
2017	24H Series – A6-Pro	Scuderia Praha	4	1	0	0	3	86	10th
2017	Blancpain GT Series Endurance Cup	Rinaldi Racing	2	0	0	0	0	0	NC
2017	Blancpain GT Series Endurance Cup – Pro-Am	Rinaldi Racing	2	0	0	0	0	12	31st
2017	Intercontinental GT Challenge	Rinaldi Racing	1	0	0	0	0	0	NC
2017	GT Series Sprint Cup	Rinaldi Racing	2	0	0	0	0	0	NC
2017	GT Series Sprint Cup – Pro-Am	Rinaldi Racing	2	0	0	0	1	16	8th
2017	Italian GT Championship – Super GT3 Pro	Scuderia Baldini 27	14	2	4	2	8	146	5th
2018	24H GT Series – A6 Pro	Bohemia Energy racing with Scuderia Praha	6	3	0	0	4	102	**3rd**
2018	Porsche Carrera Cup Italia	Dinamic Motorsport	2	0	1	0	1	18	14th
2019	24H GT Series – A6-Pro	Bohemia Energy racing with Scuderia Praha	6	4	1	4	6	84	**1st**
2019	Blancpain GT Series Endurance Cup	Bohemia Energy racing with Scuderia Praha	1	0	0	0	0	0	NC
2019	Blancpain GT Series Endurance Cup – Pro-Am	Bohemia Energy racing with Scuderia Praha	1	0	0	0	0	7	23rd
2020	24H GT Series – GT3 Pro	Dinamic Motorsport	1	0	0	0	1	15	5th
2020	24H GT Series – 991	Dinamic Motorsport	1	1	0	0	1	0	NC
2020	Italian GT Endurance Championship – GT3 Pro-Am	Ebimotors	1	0	0	0	1	8	9th
2022	Porsche Carrera Cup Italia	Team Malucelli	9	2	1	2	4	126	8th
2023	Porsche Carrera Cup Italia	Team Malucelli	12	1	2	3	3	110	8th
2025–26	24H Series Middle East – GT3 Pro-Am	Scuderia Praha	1	0	0	0	0	0	NC

=== Complete FIA GT Championship results ===
(key) (Races in bold indicate pole position) (Races in italics indicate fastest lap)

Year	Team	Car	Class	1	2	3	4	5	6	7	8	9	10	11	12	13	Pos.	Pts
2004	JMB Racing	Ferrari 575 GTC	GT	MNZ	VAL	MAG	HOC	BRN	DON; 10	SPA; 6H	SPA; 12H	SPA; 24H					NC	0
2004	JMB	Ferrari 575 GTC	GT										IMO; 11	OSC; WD	DUB	ZHU	NC	0
2006	Aston Martin Racing BMS	Aston Martin DBR9	GT1	SIL	BRN	OSC	SPA; 6H; 6	SPA; 12H; Ret	SPA; 24H; Ret	LEC; 9	DIJ	MUG	HUN; 3	ADR	DUB; 4		18th	12.5
2007	BMS Scuderia Italia	Porsche 911 GT3 RSR	GT2	ZHU; DSQ	SIL; 4	BUC; 2	MNZ; Ret	OSC; 2	SPA; 6H; 1	SPA; 12H; 1	SPA; 24H; 1	ADR; 3	BRN; 5	NOG; 2	ZOL; 4		3rd	64
2008	BMS Scuderia Italia	Ferrari F430 GTC	GT2	SIL; 3	MNZ; 5	ADR; 3	OSC; 8	SPA; 6H; 1	SPA; 12H; 1	SPA; 24H; 1	BUC; 1; 4	BUC; 2; 5	BRN; 3	NOG; 7	ZOL; 2	SAN; 6	2nd	60.5
2009	BMS Scuderia Italia	Ferrari F430 GTC	GT2	SIL; 4	ADR; 10	OSC; Ret	SPA; 6H ?	SPA; 12H ?	SPA; 24H; Ret	BUC; 3	ALG; 3	LEC; 7	ZOL; 2				7th	27

=== Complete 24 Hours of Le Mans results ===
Year	Team	Co-Drivers	Car	Class	Laps	Pos.	Class Pos.
2005	(Italy) BMS Scuderia Italia	(Italy) Michele Bartyan (Switzerland) Toni Seiler	Ferrari 550-GTS Maranello	GT1	60	DNF	DNF
2007	(Italy) Aston Martin Racing BMS	(United Kingdom) Jamie Davies (Italy) Fabio Babini	Aston Martin DBR9	GT1	336	11th	6th
2008	(Italy) BMS Scuderia Italia	(Italy) Fabio Babini (Italy) Paolo Ruberti	Ferrari F430 GT2	GT2	318	22nd	**2nd**
2009	(Italy) BMS Scuderia Italia	(Italy) Fabio Babini (Italy) Paolo Ruberti	Ferrari F430 GT2	GT2	327	19th	**2nd**
2013	(Italy) AF Corse	(Italy) Gianmaria Bruni (Italy) Giancarlo Fisichella	Ferrari 458 Italia GT2	GTE; Pro	311	21st	6th
2016	(United States) Risi Competizione	(Italy) Giancarlo Fisichella (Finland) Toni Vilander	Ferrari 488 GTE	GTE; Pro	340	20th	**2nd**

=== Complete Le Mans Endurance Series results ===
(key) (Races in bold indicate pole position; results in italics indicate fastest lap)

Year	Entrant	Class	Chassis	Engine	1	2	3	4	5	Rank	Points
2005	BMS Scuderia Italia	GT	Ferrari 550-GTS Maranello	Ferrari F133 5.9 L V12	SPA	MNZ	SIL; 5	NÜR; WD	IST; WD	19th	4

=== Complete Campionato Italiano Superstars results ===
(key) (Races in bold indicate pole position) (Races in italics indicate fastest lap)

Year	Team	Car	1	2	3	4	5	6	7	8	9	10	11	12	13	14	15	16	DC	Points
2010	Motorzone Race Car	Chevrolet Lumina CR8	MNZ; R1	MNZ; R2	IMO; R1	IMO; R2	VAL; R1; 2	VAL; R2; 1	ALG; R1	ALG; R2	MUG; R1; 13	MUG; R2; 8	VAR; R1	VAR; R2	CPR; R1	CPR; R2	VAL; R1	VAL; R2	10th	39

=== Complete American Le Mans Series results ===
(key) (Races in bold indicate pole position)

Year	Team	Class	Make	Engine	1	2	3	4	5	6	7	8	9	10	Rank	Points
2013	Risi Competizione	GT	Ferrari 458 Italia GT2	Ferrari 4.5 L V8	SEB; 2	LBH; 9	LGA; 9	LIM; 11	MOS	ELK; 10	BAL; Ret	COT; 6	VIR; 1	**PET**; 3	8th	73

=== Complete FIA World Endurance Championship results ===
(key) (Races in bold indicate pole position; races in italics indicate fastest lap)

Year	Entrant	Class	Chassis	Engine	1	2	3	4	5	6	7	8	Rank	Points
2013	8 Star Motorsports	LMGTE Am	Ferrari 458 Italia GT2	Ferrari F142 4.5L V8	SIL	SPA; 1		SÃO	**COA**; 4	FUJ	SHA	BHR	18th	30
2013	AF Corse	LMGTE Pro	Ferrari 458 Italia GT2	Ferrari F142 4.5L V8			LMS; 5						/	/

=== Complete GT World Challenge Europe results ===
==== GT World Challenge Europe Endurance Cup ====
(Races in bold indicate pole position) (Races in italics indicate fastest lap)

Year	Team	Car	Class	1	2	3	4	5	6	7	Pos.	Points
2013	Team Ukraine	Ferrari 458 Italia GT3	Pro-Am	MNZ	SIL	LEC	SPA; 6H ?	SPA; 12H ?	SPA; 24H; Ret	NÜR	NC	0
2016	Scuderia Praha	Ferrari 488 GT3	Pro-Am	MNZ; Ret	SIL; 31	LEC; Ret	SPA; 6H; 35	SPA; 12H; 25	SPA; 24H; 23	NÜR	29th	14
2017	Rinaldi Racing	Ferrari 488 GT3	Pro-Am	MON	SIL	LEC; 19	SPA; 6H; 54	SPA; 12H; 56	SPA; 24H; Ret	CAT	31st	12
2019	Bohemia Energy Racing with Scuderia Praha	Ferrari 488 GT3	Pro-Am	MON	SIL	LEC	SPA; 6H; 48	SPA; 12H; 51	SPA; 24H; Ret	CAT	23rd	7

==== GT World Challenge Europe Sprint Cup ====
(key) (Races in bold indicate pole position) (Races in italics indicate fastest lap)

Year	Team	Car	Class	1	2	3	4	5	6	7	8	9	10	Pos.	Points
2017	Rinaldi Racing	Ferrari 488 GT3	Pro-Am	MIS; QR	MIS; CR	BRH; QR	BRH; CR	ZOL; QR	ZOL; CR	HUN; QR	HUN; CR	NÜR; QR; 24	NÜR; CR; 28	8th	16

=== Complete IMSA SportsCar Championship results ===
(key) (Races in bold indicate pole position; results in italics indicate fastest lap)

Year	Team	Class	Make	Engine	1	2	3	4	5	6	7	8	9	10	11	Pos.	Points
2014	Risi Competizione	GTLM	Ferrari 458 Italia GT2	Ferrari 4.5L V8	DAY; 11	SEB; 11	LBH	LGA	WGL	MOS	IMS	ELK	VIR	COA	PET	36th	22

=== Complete Porsche Carrera Cup Italy results ===
(key) (Races in bold indicate pole position) (Races in italics indicate fastest lap)

Year	Entrant	1	2	3	4	5	6	7	8	9	10	11	12	Pos	Points
2022	Team Malucelli	IMO; 1; 12	IMO; 2 Ret	MIS; 1; 1	MIS; 2; 18	MUG1; 1; 2	MUG1; 2; 4	VLL; 1; 24	VLL; 2 WD	MNZ; 1	MNZ; 2	MUG2; 1; 3	MUG2; 2; 1	8th	126
2023	Team Malucelli	MIS1; 1; 7	MIS1; 2; 7	VLL; 1; 17	VLL; 2; 2	MUG; 1; 1	MUG; 2; 3	MNZ; 1; 15	MNZ; 2; 18	MIS2; 1; 7	MIS2; 2; 7	IMO; 1; 12	IMO; 2 Ret	8th	110
