= 2016 Touring Car Endurance Series =

2016 Touring Car Endurance Series
| Previous: | none | Next: | 2017 |

The 2016 Touring Car Endurance Series powered by Hankook was the first season of the Touring Car Endurance Series (TCES). Creventic was the organiser and promoter of the series. The races were contested with touring cars. The 24H Silverstone and the 24H Epilog Brno were part of both the TCES and the 24H Series.

== Calendar ==
| Round | Event | Circuit | Date |
|---|---|---|---|
| 1 | 24H Silverstone | Silverstone Circuit, Northamptonshire, United Kingdom | 1–3 April |
| 2 | 24H Slovakia | Automotodróm Slovakia Ring, Orechová Potôň, Slovakia | 14–16 June |
| 3 | 24H Epilog Brno (Note: Points for the Touring Car Endurance Series standings were awarded after 12 hours.) | Masaryk Circuit, Brno, Czech Republic | 14–16 October |

Race is part of both the 24H Series and the Touring Car Endurance Series

== Entry list ==
| Team | Car | No. | Drivers | Rounds |
SP3
| (Netherlands) JR Motorsport | BMW M3 E90 WTCC | 102 | (Italy) Francesco Castellacci | 3 |
| (Netherlands) JR Motorsport | BMW M3 E90 WTCC | 102 | (Netherlands) Bob Herber | 3 |
| (Netherlands) JR Motorsport | BMW M3 E90 WTCC | 102 | (Netherlands) Martin Lanting | 3 |
| (Netherlands) JR Motorsport | BMW M3 E90 WTCC | 102 | (Belgium) Ward Sluys | 3 |
| (Netherlands) JR Motorsport | BMW M3 E90 WTCC | 103 | (Netherlands) Mark van der Aa | 3 |
| (Netherlands) JR Motorsport | BMW M3 E90 WTCC | 103 | (Netherlands) Koen Bogaerts | 3 |
| (Netherlands) JR Motorsport | BMW M3 E90 WTCC | 103 | (Netherlands) Daan Meijer | 3 |
| (Netherlands) JR Motorsport | BMW M3 E90 WTCC | 103 | (Netherlands) Bas Schouten | 3 |
| (Czech Republic) RTR Projects | KTM X-Bow GT4 | 224 | (Czech Republic) Erik Janiš | 3 |
| (Czech Republic) RTR Projects | KTM X-Bow GT4 | 224 | (Czech Republic) Tomas Kwolek | 3 |
| (Czech Republic) RTR Projects | KTM X-Bow GT4 | 224 | (Czech Republic) Tomas Miniberger | 3 |
| (Czech Republic) RTR Projects | KTM X-Bow GT4 | 224 | (Czech Republic) Sergej Pavlovec | 3 |
| (Czech Republic) RTR Projects | KTM X-Bow GT4 | 224 | (Czech Republic) Daniel Skalický | 3 |
| (Germany) CCS Racing | KTM X-Bow GT4 | 226 | (Luxembourg) Charel Arendt | 3 |
| (Germany) CCS Racing | KTM X-Bow GT4 | 226 | (Luxembourg) Tom Kieffer | 3 |
| (Germany) CCS Racing | KTM X-Bow GT4 | 226 | (Luxembourg) Tommy Rollinger | 3 |
| (Germany) CCS Racing | KTM X-Bow GT4 | 226 | (Germany) Uwe Schmidt | 3 |
| (Germany) CCS Racing | KTM X-Bow GT4 | 226 | (Austria) Georg Silbermayr | 3 |
TCR
| (Lebanon) Memac Ogilvy Duel Racing | Seat León Cup Racer | 1 | (United Kingdom) Nabil Moutran | 1 |
| (Lebanon) Memac Ogilvy Duel Racing | Seat León Cup Racer | 1 | (United Kingdom) Ramzi Moutran | 1 |
| (Lebanon) Memac Ogilvy Duel Racing | Seat León Cup Racer | 1 | (United Kingdom) Sami Moutran | 1 |
| (Lebanon) Memac Ogilvy Duel Racing | Seat León Cup Racer | 1 | (United Kingdom) Phil Quaife | 1 |
| (United Kingdom) Saxon Motorsport | BMW 135d GTR (E87) | 117 | (United Kingdom) Nick Barrow | 2 |
| (United Kingdom) Saxon Motorsport | BMW 135d GTR (E87) | 117 | (United Kingdom) Tom Barrow | 2 |
| (United Kingdom) Saxon Motorsport | BMW 135d GTR (E87) | 117 | (United Kingdom) Richard Corbett | 2 |
| (Netherlands) NKPP Racing | Seat León Cup Racer | 125 | (Netherlands) Gijs Bessem | All |
| (Netherlands) NKPP Racing | Seat León Cup Racer | 125 | (Netherlands) Harry Hilders | All |
| (Netherlands) NKPP Racing | Seat León Cup Racer | 125 | (Netherlands) Martin van den Berge | 1 |
| (Netherlands) NKPP Racing | Seat León Cup Racer | 125 | (Netherlands) Simon Gras | 2 |
| (Netherlands) NKPP Racing | Seat León Cup Racer | 125 | (Netherlands) Rob Rappange | 3 |
| (Netherlands) Team Bleekemolen | Seat León Cup Racer | 127 | (Netherlands) Sebastiaan Bleekemolen | 1 |
| (Netherlands) Team Bleekemolen | Seat León Cup Racer | 127 | (Netherlands) Dennis de Borst | 1 |
| (Netherlands) Team Bleekemolen | Seat León Cup Racer | 127 | (Netherlands) Melvin de Groot | 1 |
| (Netherlands) Team Bleekemolen | Seat León Cup Racer | 127 | (Netherlands) Pim van Riet | 1 |
| (United Kingdom) Zest Racecar Engineering | Seat León Cup Racer | 130 | (United Kingdom) Andrew Hack | 1 |
| (United Kingdom) Zest Racecar Engineering | Seat León Cup Racer | 130 | (United Kingdom) Lucas Orrock | 1 |
| (United Kingdom) Zest Racecar Engineering | Seat León Cup Racer | 130 | (United Kingdom) Jon Cullom | 1 |
| (United Kingdom) Zest Racecar Engineering | Seat León Cup Racer | 130 | (United Kingdom) Rob Cullom | 1 |
| (Switzerland) TTC Racing | Seat León Cup Racer | 131 | (Austria) Klaus Kresnik | 3 |
| (Switzerland) TTC Racing | Seat León Cup Racer | 131 | (Switzerland) Daniel Schilliger | 3 |
| (Switzerland) TTC Racing | Seat León Cup Racer | 131 | (Switzerland) Fredy Suter | 3 |
| (Netherlands) ARC Bratislava by Ferry Monster Autosport | Seat León Cup Racer | 134 | (Slovakia) Miro Horňák | 2 |
| (Netherlands) ARC Bratislava by Ferry Monster Autosport | Seat León Cup Racer | 134 | (Slovakia) Matej Konopka | 2 |
| (Netherlands) ARC Bratislava by Ferry Monster Autosport | Seat León Cup Racer | 134 | (Slovakia) Miro Konôpka | 2 |
| (Netherlands) ARC Bratislava by Ferry Monster Autosport | Seat León Cup Racer | 134 | (Slovakia) Zdeno Mikuláško | 2 |
| (Netherlands) ARC Bratislava by Ferry Monster Autosport | Seat León Cup Racer | 134 | (Slovakia) Andřej Studenič | 2 |
| (United Kingdom) RS Connect | Seat León Cup Racer | 144 | (United Kingdom) Jacob Hodson | 1 |
| (United Kingdom) RS Connect | Seat León Cup Racer | 144 | (United Kingdom) Lea Hodson | 1 |
| (United Kingdom) RS Connect | Seat León Cup Racer | 144 | (United Kingdom) Adam Jones | 1 |
| (United Kingdom) RS Connect | Seat León Cup Racer | 144 | (United Kingdom) Gavin Jones | 1 |
| (Italy) Pit Lane Competizioni | Seat León Cup Racer | 156 | (United States) Zach Arnold | 1 |
| (Italy) Pit Lane Competizioni | Seat León Cup Racer | 156 | (Italy) Enrico Bettera | 1 |
| (Italy) Pit Lane Competizioni | Seat León Cup Racer | 156 | (Italy) Roberto Ferri | 1 |
| (Italy) Pit Lane Competizioni | Seat León Cup Racer | 156 | (Italy) Alberto Vescovi | 1 |
| (Netherlands) Red Camel-Jordans.nl | Seat León Cup Racer | 303 | (Netherlands) Ivo Breukers | All |
| (Netherlands) Red Camel-Jordans.nl | Seat León Cup Racer | 303 | (Netherlands) Rik Breukers | All |
| (Netherlands) Red Camel-Jordans.nl | Seat León Cup Racer | 303 | (Netherlands) Bert de Heus | 1 |
| (Netherlands) Red Camel-Jordans.nl | Seat León Cup Racer | 303 | (Belgium) Kris Cools | 2 |
| (Netherlands) Red Camel-Jordans.nl | Seat León Cup Racer | 303 | (Austria) Klaus Kresnik | 2 |
| (Netherlands) Red Camel-Jordans.nl | Seat León Cup Racer | 303 | (Russia) Maxim Aronov | 3 |
| (Netherlands) Red Camel-Jordans.nl | Seat León Cup Racer | 303 | (Netherlands) Monny Krant | 3 |
SP-Touring
| (Netherlands) JR Motorsport | BMW M3 E90 WTCC | 102 | (Netherlands) Bob Herber | 1 |
| (Netherlands) JR Motorsport | BMW M3 E90 WTCC | 102 | (Netherlands) Martin Lanting | 1 |
| (Netherlands) JR Motorsport | BMW M3 E90 WTCC | 102 | (United Kingdom) Steven Liquorish | 1 |
| (Netherlands) JR Motorsport | BMW M3 E90 WTCC | 102 | (Switzerland) Christoph Ulrich | 1 |
| (United Kingdom) Saxon Motorsport | BMW 135d GTR (E87) | 117 | (United Kingdom) Clint Bardwell | 1 |
| (United Kingdom) Saxon Motorsport | BMW 135d GTR (E87) | 117 | (United Kingdom) Nick Barrow | 1 |
| (United Kingdom) Saxon Motorsport | BMW 135d GTR (E87) | 117 | (United Kingdom) Neil Primrose | 1 |
| (United Kingdom) Saxon Motorsport | BMW 135d GTR (E87) | 117 | (United Kingdom) David Robinson | 1 |
| (France) Vortex V8 | GC Automobile GC10.2-V6 | 203 | (France) Lionel Amrouche | 1 |
| (France) Vortex V8 | GC Automobile GC10.2-V6 | 203 | (France) Cyril Calmon | 1 |
| (France) Vortex V8 | GC Automobile GC10.2-V6 | 203 | (France) Jérémy Reymond | 1 |
| (France) Vortex V8 | GC Automobile GC10.2-V6 | 203 | (Switzerland) Kurt Thiel | 1 |
| (United Kingdom) Team ABBA with Rollcentre Racing | BMW M3 V8 (E46) | 246 | (United Kingdom) Charles Lamb | 1 |
| (United Kingdom) Team ABBA with Rollcentre Racing | BMW M3 V8 (E46) | 246 | (United Kingdom) Richard Neary | 1 |
| (United Kingdom) Team ABBA with Rollcentre Racing | BMW M3 V8 (E46) | 246 | (United Kingdom) Richard Roberts | 1 |
| (United Kingdom) Team ABBA with Rollcentre Racing | BMW M3 V8 (E46) | 246 | (United Kingdom) Martin Short | 1 |
A3
| (Netherlands) Cor Euser Racing | BMW M3 (E46) | 71 | (United States) Dom Bastien | 1 |
| (Netherlands) Cor Euser Racing | BMW M3 (E46) | 71 | (United Kingdom) Derek Bennett | 1 |
| (Netherlands) Cor Euser Racing | BMW M3 (E46) | 71 | (Netherlands) Cor Euser | 1 |
| (Netherlands) Cor Euser Racing | BMW M3 (E46) | 71 | (United Kingdom) Tom Webb | 1 |
| (Netherlands) Cor Euser Racing | BMW M3 (E46) | 71 | (United Kingdom) Craig Wilkins | 1 |
| (United Kingdom) Synchro Motorsport | Honda Civic Type R (FK2) | 76 | (United Kingdom) Martin Byford | 1 |
| (United Kingdom) Synchro Motorsport | Honda Civic Type R (FK2) | 76 | (United Kingdom) Alyn James | 1 |
| (United Kingdom) Synchro Motorsport | Honda Civic Type R (FK2) | 76 | (United Kingdom) Daniel Wheeler | 1 |
| (United Kingdom) RKC/TGM | Honda Civic Type R (FD2) | 99 | (United Kingdom) Ricky Coomber | 3 |
| (United Kingdom) RKC/TGM | Honda Civic Type R (FD2) | 99 | (United Kingdom) David Drinkwater | 3 |
| (United Kingdom) RKC/TGM | Honda Civic Type R (FD2) | 99 | (United Kingdom) Tom Gannon | 3 |
| (United Kingdom) RKC/TGM | Honda Civic Type R (FD2) | 99 | (United Kingdom) William Gannon | 3 |
| (United Kingdom) RKC/TGM | Honda Civic Type R (FD2) | 99 | (United Kingdom) James Kaye | 3 |
| (United Kingdom) Brunswick | BMW 1 Series (E87) | 100 | (United Kingdom) Michael McInerney | 1 |
| (United Kingdom) Brunswick | BMW 1 Series (E87) | 100 | (United Kingdom) Sean McInerney | 1 |
| (United Kingdom) Brunswick | BMW 1 Series (E87) | 100 | (Finland) Rory Penttinen | 1 |
| (United Kingdom) Brunswick | BMW 1 Series (E87) | 100 | (United Kingdom) James Thorpe | 1 |
| (United Kingdom) R H Race Engineering | SEAT León Supercopa | 109 | (Australia) Clint Harvey | 2 |
| (United Kingdom) R H Race Engineering | SEAT León Supercopa | 109 | (Australia) Malcolm Niall | 2 |
| (United Kingdom) R H Race Engineering | SEAT León Supercopa | 109 | (United Kingdom) David Nye | 2 |
| (United Kingdom) R H Race Engineering | SEAT León Supercopa | 109 | (Australia) Mark Pilatti | 2 |
| (United Kingdom) track-club | SEAT León Supercopa | 111 | (United Kingdom) Adam Balon | 1 |
| (United Kingdom) track-club | SEAT León Supercopa | 111 | (United Kingdom) Adam Knight | 1 |
| (United Kingdom) track-club | SEAT León Supercopa | 111 | (United Kingdom) Adam Mackay | 1 |
| (United Kingdom) track-club | SEAT León Supercopa | 111 | (United Kingdom) Steven Train | 1 |
| (Czech Republic) Valek Autosport | BMW M3 GTR (E36) | 113 | (Czech Republic) Marek Fried | 3 |
| (Czech Republic) Valek Autosport | BMW M3 GTR (E36) | 113 | (Czech Republic) Petr Válek | 3 |
| (Czech Republic) Valek Autosport | BMW M3 GTR (E36) | 113 | (Czech Republic) Dan Zelinský | 3 |
| (United Kingdom) Intersport Racing | BMW M3 CSL (E46) | 114 | (United Kingdom) Simon Atkinson | 1 |
| (United Kingdom) Intersport Racing | BMW M3 CSL (E46) | 114 | (United Kingdom) Kevin Clarke | 1 |
| (United Kingdom) Intersport Racing | BMW M3 CSL (E46) | 114 | (United Kingdom) Fiona James | 1 |
| (United Kingdom) Intersport Racing | BMW M3 CSL (E46) | 114 | (United Kingdom) Ryan Lindsay | 1 |
| (United Kingdom) WEC Motorsport | BMW M3 (E46) | 120 | (United Kingdom) Dave Cox | 1 |
| (United Kingdom) WEC Motorsport | BMW M3 (E46) | 120 | (United Kingdom) Jason Cox | 1 |
| (United Kingdom) WEC Motorsport | BMW M3 (E46) | 120 | (United Kingdom) Michael Cox | 1 |
| (United Kingdom) WEC Motorsport | BMW M3 (E46) | 120 | (United Kingdom) George Haynes | 1 |
| (United Kingdom) Kinetic Racing | SEAT León Supercopa | 122 | (Qatar) Abdulaziz Abdulla | 1 |
| (United Kingdom) Kinetic Racing | SEAT León Supercopa | 122 | (Qatar) Hamad Saeed Al-Asam | 1 |
| (United Kingdom) Kinetic Racing | SEAT León Supercopa | 122 | (United Kingdom) Mike Nash | 1 |
| (United Kingdom) Kinetic Racing | SEAT León Supercopa | 122 | (United Kingdom) Graham Saul | 1 |
| (United Kingdom) Kinetic Racing | SEAT León Supercopa | 122 | (United Kingdom) Dave Ward | 1 |
| (United Kingdom) K&S Motorsport | BMW M3 CSL (E46) | 123 | (United Kingdom) Luke Bennett | 1–2 |
| (United Kingdom) K&S Motorsport | BMW M3 CSL (E46) | 123 | (United Kingdom) Nathan Dew | 1–2 |
| (United Kingdom) K&S Motorsport | BMW M3 CSL (E46) | 123 | (United Kingdom) Paul Mensley | 1–2 |
| (United Kingdom) K&S Motorsport | BMW M3 CSL (E46) | 123 | (United Kingdom) Kenny Coleman | 1 |
| (United Kingdom) K&S Motorsport | BMW M3 CSL (E46) | 123 | (United Kingdom) Mark Wright | 1 |
| (United Kingdom) K&S Motorsport | BMW M3 CSL (E46) | 123 | (United Kingdom) Malcolm Harding | 2 |
| (United Kingdom) K&S Motorsport | BMW M3 CSL (E46) | 123 | (United Kingdom) Ross Murray | 2 |
| (United Kingdom) Team BRIT | Volkswagen Golf GTI (Mk7) | 136 | (United Kingdom) Mark Allen | 1 |
| (United Kingdom) Team BRIT | Volkswagen Golf GTI (Mk7) | 136 | (United Kingdom) Martyn Compton | 1 |
| (United Kingdom) Team BRIT | Volkswagen Golf GTI (Mk7) | 136 | (United Kingdom) David Pittard | 1 |
| (United Kingdom) Team BRIT | Volkswagen Golf GTI (Mk7) | 136 | (United Kingdom) Julian Thomas | 1 |
| (United Kingdom) Sub Zero Wolf | SEAT León Supercopa | 139 | (United Kingdom) Craig Davies | 1 |
| (United Kingdom) Sub Zero Wolf | SEAT León Supercopa | 139 | (United Kingdom) Paul Smith | 1 |
| (United Kingdom) Sub Zero Wolf | SEAT León Supercopa | 139 | (United Kingdom) Robert Smith | 1 |
| (United Kingdom) Motoreasy Racing | SEAT León Supercopa | 155 | (United Kingdom) Joe Fulbrook | 1 |
| (United Kingdom) Motoreasy Racing | SEAT León Supercopa | 155 | (United Kingdom) Aaron Mason | 1 |
| (United Kingdom) Motoreasy Racing | SEAT León Supercopa | 155 | (United Kingdom) Simon Tomlinson | 1 |
| (United Kingdom) Motoreasy Racing | SEAT León Supercopa | 155 | (United Kingdom) Tom Wilson | 1 |
| (France) Team Altran Peugeot | Peugeot 208 GTI | 205 | (France) Gérard Bonjean | 1 |
| (France) Team Altran Peugeot | Peugeot 208 GTI | 205 | (France) Patrick Brochier | 1 |
| (France) Team Altran Peugeot | Peugeot 208 GTI | 205 | (France) Gilles Courtois | 1 |
| (France) Team Altran Peugeot | Peugeot 208 GTI | 205 | (France) Sébastien Dussolliet | 1 |
| (France) Team Altran Peugeot | Peugeot 208 GTI | 208 | (France) Thierry Blaise | 1 |
| (France) Team Altran Peugeot | Peugeot 208 GTI | 208 | (France) Guillaume Roman | 1 |
| (France) Team Altran Peugeot | Peugeot 208 GTI | 208 | (France) Stéphane Ventaja | 1 |
| (France) Team Altran Peugeot | Peugeot 208 GTI | 208 | (Belgium) Sarah Bovy | 1 |
| (France) Team Altran Peugeot | Peugeot 208 GTI | 208 | (United Kingdom) Bradley Philpot | 1 |
| (Denmark) Scangrip Racing | BMW 335i Coupé (E92) | 335 | (Denmark) Niels Borum | 1 |
| (Denmark) Scangrip Racing | BMW 335i Coupé (E92) | 335 | (New Zealand) Maurice O'Reilley | 1 |
| (Denmark) Scangrip Racing | BMW 335i Coupé (E92) | 335 | (Denmark) Morten Dons | 1 |
| (Denmark) Scangrip Racing | BMW 335i Coupé (E92) | 335 | (Denmark) Frederik Nymark | 1 |
CUP1
| (Germany) Bonk Motorsport | BMW M235i Racing | 146 | (Germany) Hermann Bock | 3 |
| (Germany) Bonk Motorsport | BMW M235i Racing | 146 | (Germany) Axel Burghardt | 3 |
| (Germany) Bonk Motorsport | BMW M235i Racing | 146 | (Germany) Max Partl | 3 |
| (Germany) Bonk Motorsport | BMW M235i Racing | 146 | (Germany) Rainer Partl | 3 |
| (Germany) Bonk Motorsport | BMW M235i Racing | 146 | (Germany) Volker Piepmeyer | 3 |
| (Germany) Sorg Rennsport | BMW M235i Racing | 151 | (Austria) Siegfried Kuzdas | 2 |
| (Germany) Sorg Rennsport | BMW M235i Racing | 151 | (Germany) Thomas Müller | 2 |
| (Germany) Sorg Rennsport | BMW M235i Racing | 151 | (United States) Ace Robey | 2 |
| (Belgium) Speedlover | BMW M235i Racing | 153 | (Spain) Jesús Díez | 2 |
| (Belgium) Speedlover | BMW M235i Racing | 153 | (Belgium) Jean-Michel Gerome | 2 |
| (Belgium) Speedlover | BMW M235i Racing | 153 | (Spain) José Manuel de los Milagros | 2 |
| (Belgium) Speedlover | BMW M235i Racing | 153 | (Belgium) Pierre-Yves Paque | 2 |
| (Belgium) JJ Motorsport | BMW M235i Racing | 154 | (United Kingdom) Richard Abra | 1 |
| (Belgium) JJ Motorsport | BMW M235i Racing | 154 | (United Kingdom) Mark Lemmer | 1 |
| (Belgium) JJ Motorsport | BMW M235i Racing | 154 | (United Kingdom) Mark Poole | 1 |
| (Belgium) JJ Motorsport | BMW M235i Racing | 154 | (Russia) Timur Sardarov | 1 |
| (Luxembourg) DUWO Racing | BMW M235i Racing | 235 | (Luxembourg) Jean-Marie Dumont | 1 |
| (Luxembourg) DUWO Racing | BMW M235i Racing | 235 | (United Kingdom) Philip Harris | 1 |
| (Luxembourg) DUWO Racing | BMW M235i Racing | 235 | (United Kingdom) Adrian Watt | 1 |
| (Luxembourg) DUWO Racing | BMW M235i Racing | 235 | (United States) Alexander W. Wetzlich | 1 |
| (Luxembourg) DUWO Racing | BMW M235i Racing | 235 | (United Kingdom) Chris Wilson | 1 |
A2
| (United Kingdom) RKC/TGM | Honda Civic Type R (FD2) | 99 | (United Kingdom) Ricky Coomber | 1 |
| (United Kingdom) RKC/TGM | Honda Civic Type R (FD2) | 99 | (United Kingdom) David Drinkwater | 1 |
| (United Kingdom) RKC/TGM | Honda Civic Type R (FD2) | 99 | (United Kingdom) Tom Gannon | 1 |
| (United Kingdom) RKC/TGM | Honda Civic Type R (FD2) | 99 | (United Kingdom) William Gannon | 1 |
| (United Kingdom) RKC/TGM | Honda Civic Type R (FD2) | 99 | (United Kingdom) Gavin Spencer | 1 |
| (Switzerland) presenza.eu Racing Team Clio (Note: Car No. 112 entered with a Renault Clio Cup (IV) at the 24H Silverstone (Rnd 1).) | Renault Clio Cup (III) | 112 | (Italy) Luigi Stanco | 1–2 |
| (Switzerland) presenza.eu Racing Team Clio | Renault Clio Cup (III) | 112 | (Switzerland) Stefan Tanner | 1–2 |
| (Switzerland) presenza.eu Racing Team Clio | Renault Clio Cup (III) | 112 | (Netherlands) Michel Schaap | 1–2 |
| (Switzerland) presenza.eu Racing Team Clio | Renault Clio Cup (III) | 112 | (Netherlands) Christian Dijkhof | 1 |
| (Switzerland) presenza.eu Racing Team Clio | Renault Clio Cup (III) | 112 | (Switzerland) Stephan Jäggi | 1 |
| (Switzerland) presenza.eu Racing Team Clio | Renault Clio Cup (III) | 112 | (Switzerland) Armando Stanco | 2 |
| (Switzerland) presenza.eu Racing Team Clio | Renault Clio Cup (III) | 112 | (Switzerland) Endy Stanco | 2 |
| (Switzerland) presenza.eu Racing Team Clio | Renault Clio Cup (IV) | 212 | (Denmark) Ole Klitgaard | 1 |
| (Switzerland) presenza.eu Racing Team Clio | Renault Clio Cup (IV) | 212 | (Denmark) Niels Nyboe | 1 |
| (Switzerland) presenza.eu Racing Team Clio | Renault Clio Cup (IV) | 212 | (Denmark) Mads Pedersen | 1 |
| (Switzerland) presenza.eu Racing Team Clio | Renault Clio Cup (IV) | 212 | (Denmark) Christian Rytter | 1 |
| (Switzerland) presenza.eu Racing Team Clio | Renault Clio Cup (IV) | 212 | (Denmark) Tim Söderhamn | 1 |
| (Switzerland) presenza.eu Racing Team Clio | Renault Clio Cup (IV) | 212 | (Switzerland) Patrik Meier | 2 |
| (Switzerland) presenza.eu Racing Team Clio | Renault Clio Cup (IV) | 212 | (Netherlands) Michel Schaap | 2 |
| (Switzerland) presenza.eu Racing Team Clio | Renault Clio Cup (IV) | 212 | (Italy) Luigi Stanco | 2 |
| (Switzerland) presenza.eu Racing Team Clio | Renault Clio Cup (IV) | 212 | (Switzerland) Stefan Tanner | 2 |
| (Switzerland) presenza.eu Racing Team Clio | Renault Clio Cup (IV) | 212 | (Portugal) António Teixeira | 2 |
| (United Kingdom) Rogue Motorsport | Toyota GT86 | 162 | (United Kingdom) Alric Kitson | 1 |
| (United Kingdom) Rogue Motorsport | Toyota GT86 | 162 | (United Kingdom) Patrick Mortell | 1 |
| (United Kingdom) Rogue Motorsport | Toyota GT86 | 162 | (United Kingdom) Merill Readett | 1 |
| (United Kingdom) Rogue Motorsport | Toyota GT86 | 162 | (United Kingdom) Chris Valentine | 1 |
| (United Kingdom) Rogue Motorsport | Toyota GT86 | 163 | (United Kingdom) Clive Bailye | 1 |
| (United Kingdom) Rogue Motorsport | Toyota GT86 | 163 | (United Kingdom) Malcolm Edeson | 1 |
| (United Kingdom) Rogue Motorsport | Toyota GT86 | 163 | (United Kingdom) J. M. Littman | 1 |
| (United Kingdom) Rogue Motorsport | Toyota GT86 | 163 | (United Kingdom) Patrick Mortell | 1 |
| (United Kingdom) AREA/Owens Endurance | Honda Civic (EP3) | 168 | (United Kingdom) Mark Harris | 1 |
| (United Kingdom) AREA/Owens Endurance | Honda Civic (EP3) | 168 | (United Kingdom) Rob Howard | 1 |
| (United Kingdom) AREA/Owens Endurance | Honda Civic (EP3) | 168 | (United Kingdom) Endaf Owens | 1 |
| (United Kingdom) AREA/Owens Endurance | Honda Civic (EP3) | 168 | (United Kingdom) Carl Swift | 1 |
| (Denmark) Team K-Rejser | Peugeot RCZ | 171 | (Denmark) Jan Engelbrecht | 1 |
| (Denmark) Team K-Rejser | Peugeot RCZ | 171 | (Denmark) Jacob Kristensen | 1 |
| (Denmark) Team K-Rejser | Peugeot RCZ | 171 | (Denmark) Jens Mølgaard | 1 |
| (Denmark) Team K-Rejser | Peugeot RCZ | 171 | (Denmark) Thomas Sørensen | 1 |
| (Denmark) Team Sally Racing | Renault Clio Cup (III) | 172 | (Denmark) Mads Christensen | 1 |
| (Denmark) Team Sally Racing | Renault Clio Cup (III) | 172 | (Denmark) Steffan Jusjong | 1 |
| (Denmark) Team Sally Racing | Renault Clio Cup (III) | 172 | (Denmark) Sune Marcussen | 1 |
| (Denmark) Team Sally Racing | Renault Clio Cup (III) | 172 | (Denmark) Peter Obel | 1 |
| (Denmark) Team Sally Racing | Renault Clio Cup (III) | 172 | (Denmark) Martin Sally Pedersen | 1 |
| (Belgium) VDS Racing Adventures | Honda Civic Type R (EP3) | 173 | (Belgium) José Close | 1 |
| (Belgium) VDS Racing Adventures | Honda Civic Type R (EP3) | 173 | (Belgium) Grégory Paisse | 1 |
| (Belgium) VDS Racing Adventures | Honda Civic Type R (EP3) | 173 | (Belgium) Raphaël van der Straten | 1 |
| (Belgium) VDS Racing Adventures | Honda Civic Type R (EP3) | 173 | (Belgium) Thierry de Latre du Bosqueau | 1 |
| (Germany) Scantech Racing by Sorg Rennsport | Renault Clio RS (III) | 175 | (Germany) Rickard Nilsson | 2 |
| (Germany) Scantech Racing by Sorg Rennsport | Renault Clio RS (III) | 175 | (Germany) Tanja Nilsson | 2 |
| (Hong Kong) Modena Motorsports | Renault Clio Cup (III) | 216 | (Canada) John Shen | 1 |
| (Hong Kong) Modena Motorsports | Renault Clio Cup (III) | 216 | (Canada) Wayne Shen | 1 |
| (Hong Kong) Modena Motorsports | Renault Clio Cup (III) | 216 | (Netherlands) Francis Tjia | 1 |
| (Hong Kong) Modena Motorsports | Renault Clio Cup (III) | 217 | (Canada) John Shen | 1 |
| (Hong Kong) Modena Motorsports | Renault Clio Cup (III) | 217 | (Canada) Wayne Shen | 1 |
| (Hong Kong) Modena Motorsports | Renault Clio Cup (III) | 217 | (Netherlands) Francis Tjia | 1 |
D1
| (Austria) Winkler Tuning | BMW 320d (E46) | 190 | (Austria) Markus Haider | 2 |
| (Austria) Winkler Tuning | BMW 320d (E46) | 190 | (Austria) Simon Kölbl | 2 |
| (Austria) Winkler Tuning | BMW 320d (E46) | 190 | (Austria) Markus Mair | 2 |
| (Austria) Winkler Tuning | BMW 320d (E46) | 190 | (Austria) Markus Reitbauer | 2 |
| (Austria) Winkler Tuning | BMW 320d (E46) | 190 | (Austria) Michael Winkler | 2 |
| (Belgium) RECY RACING TEAM | BMW 120d (E87) | 194 | (Belgium) Erik Crabbe | 1 |
| (Belgium) RECY RACING TEAM | BMW 120d (E87) | 194 | (Belgium) Johan van Loo | 1 |
| (Belgium) RECY RACING TEAM | BMW 120d (E87) | 194 | (Belgium) Wim Meulders | 1 |
| (Belgium) RECY RACING TEAM | BMW 120d (E87) | 194 | (Belgium) Thomas Piessens | 1 |
| (Belgium) RECY RACING TEAM | BMW 120d (E87) | 194 | (Belgium) Jan de Vocht | 1 |
| (Netherlands) Red Camel-Jordans.nl | SEAT León TDI (Mk2) | 195 | (Netherlands) Maarten Mus | 1–2 |
| (Netherlands) Red Camel-Jordans.nl | SEAT León TDI (Mk2) | 195 | (United Kingdom) Tim Stanbridge | 1–2 |
| (Netherlands) Red Camel-Jordans.nl | SEAT León TDI (Mk2) | 195 | (Netherlands) Sjaco Griffioen | 1 |
| (Netherlands) Red Camel-Jordans.nl | SEAT León TDI (Mk2) | 195 | (Netherlands) Henk Thijssen | 2 |
| (Switzerland) Dieselpower | Volkswagen Golf TDI Cup (Mk5) | 197 | (Netherlands) Berend van Berkel | 2 |
| (Switzerland) Dieselpower | Volkswagen Golf TDI Cup (Mk5) | 197 | (Switzerland) Andreas Kempf | 2 |
| (Switzerland) Dieselpower | Volkswagen Golf TDI Cup (Mk5) | 197 | (Netherlands) Maarten Mus | 2 |
| (Switzerland) Dieselpower | Volkswagen Golf TDI Cup (Mk5) | 197 | (United Kingdom) Tim Stanbridge | 2 |
| (Switzerland) Dieselpower | Volkswagen Golf TDI Cup (Mk5) | 197 | (Netherlands) Henk Thijssen | 2 |
| (Netherlands) Equipe Verschuur | BMW 123d (E87) | 198 | (Netherlands) Jarno Iprenburg | 1 |
| (Netherlands) Equipe Verschuur | BMW 123d (E87) | 198 | (Netherlands) Hans Kuipers | 1 |
| (Netherlands) Equipe Verschuur | BMW 123d (E87) | 198 | (Netherlands) Tom van de Mosselaar | 1 |
| (Netherlands) Equipe Verschuur | BMW 123d (E87) | 198 | (Netherlands) Dries Zwienenberg | 1 |

== Results and standings ==
=== Race results ===
Bold indicates overall winner.

| Classes | (United Kingdom) Silverstone (Round 1) | Slovakia (Round 2) | (Czech Republic) Brno (Round 3) |
|---|---|---|---|
| SP3 Winners | did not participate | | (Netherlands) No. 125 NKPP Racing |
| SP3 Winners | did not participate | | (Netherlands) **Gijs Bessem** **(Netherlands) Harry Hilders** **(Netherlands) Rob Rappange** |
| TCR Winners | (Netherlands) No. 303 Red Camel-Jordans.nl | (Netherlands) **No. 134 ARC Bratislava by Ferry Monster Autosport** | Merged with SP3 class |
| TCR Winners | (Netherlands) Ivo Breukers (Netherlands) Rik Breukers (Netherlands) Bert de Heus | (Slovakia) **Miro Horňák** **(Slovakia) Matej Konopka** **(Slovakia) Miro Konôpka** **(Slovakia) Zdeno Mikuláško** **(Slovakia) Andřej Studenič** | Merged with SP3 class |
| SP-Touring Winners | (United Kingdom) **No. 246 Team ABBA with Rollcentre Racing** | No entries | |
| SP-Touring Winners | (United Kingdom) **Charles Lamb** **(United Kingdom) Richard Neary** **(United Kingdom) Richard Roberts** **(United Kingdom) Martin Short** | No entries | |
| A3 Winners | (France) No. 208 Team Altran Peugeot | Merged with CUP1 class | (United Kingdom) No. 99 RKC/TGM |
| A3 Winners | (France) Thierry Blaise (Belgium) Sarah Bovy (United Kingdom) Bradley Philpot (France) Guillaume Roman (France) Stéphane Ventaja | Merged with CUP1 class | (United Kingdom) Ricky Coomber (United Kingdom) David Drinkwater (United Kingdom) Tom Gannon (United Kingdom) William Gannon (United Kingdom) James Kaye |
| CUP1 Winners | (Belgium) No. 154 JJ Motorsport | (Belgium) No. 153 Speedlover | Merged with A3 class |
| CUP1 Winners | (United Kingdom) Richard Abra (United Kingdom) Mark Lemmer (United Kingdom) Mark Poole (Russia) Timur Sardarov | (Spain) Jesús Díez (Belgium) Jean-Michel Gerome (Spain) José Manuel de los Milagros (Belgium) Pierre-Yves Paque | Merged with A3 class |
| A2 Winners | (Hong Kong) No. 216 Modena Motorsports | (Switzerland) No. 112 presenza.eu Racing Team Clio | No entries |
| A2 Winners | (Canada) John Shen (Canada) Wayne Shen (Netherlands) Francis Tjia | (Netherlands) Michel Schaap (Switzerland) Armando Stanco (Switzerland) Endy Stanco (Italy) Luigi Stanco (Switzerland) Stefan Tanner | No entries |
| D1 Winners | (Belgium) No. 194 RECY RACING TEAM | (Austria) No. 190 Winkler Tuning | No entries |
| D1 Winners | (Belgium) Erik Crabbe (Belgium) Johan van Loo (Belgium) Wim Meulders (Belgium) Thomas Piessens (Belgium) Jan de Vocht | (Austria) Markus Haider (Austria) Simon Kölbl (Austria) Markus Mair (Austria) Markus Reitbauer (Austria) Michael Winkler | No entries |

== See also ==
- Touring Car Endurance Series
- 2016 24H Series
