= 2017 Touring Car Endurance Series =

Second season of the Touring Car Endurance Series

The 2017 Touring Car Endurance Series powered by Hankook was the second season of the Touring Car Endurance Series (TCES). Creventic was the organiser and promoter of the series.

== Calendar ==
Round	Event	Circuit	Date
1	24H Silverstone	Silverstone Circuit, Northamptonshire, United Kingdom	31 March–1 April
2	12H Magny-Cours	Circuit de Nevers Magny-Cours, Magny-Cours, France	20–22 April
3	24H Misano	Misano World Circuit Marco Simoncelli, Misano Adriatico, Italy	6–8 July
4	24H Barcelona - Fermín Vélez Trophy	Circuit de Barcelona-Catalunya, Montmeló, Spain	1–3 September
5	12H Spa-Francorchamps	Circuit de Spa-Francorchamps, Spa, Belgium	6–8 October

== Entry list ==
Team	Car	No.	Drivers	Rounds
SP3-GT4
(Germany) Mercedes-AMG Testteam Black Falcon	Mercedes-AMG GT4	2	(Saudi Arabia) Saud Al Faisal	5
(Germany) Mercedes-AMG Testteam Black Falcon	Mercedes-AMG GT4	2	(United Kingdom) Adam Christodoulou	5
(Germany) Mercedes-AMG Testteam Black Falcon	Mercedes-AMG GT4	2	(Spain) Alexander Toril	5
(Germany) Mercedes-AMG Testteam Black Falcon	Mercedes-AMG GT4	2	(Spain) Miguel Toril	5
(Netherlands) Cor Euser Racing	Lotus Evora GT4	70	(Netherlands) Cor Euser	5
(Netherlands) Cor Euser Racing	Lotus Evora GT4	70	(Canada) Peter Klutt	5
(Netherlands) Cor Euser Racing	Lotus Evora GT4	70	(Canada) Anthony Polito	5
(Germany) Mercedes-AMG Testteam HTP Motorsport	Mercedes-AMG GT4	84	(Netherlands) Indy Dontje	5
(Germany) Mercedes-AMG Testteam HTP Motorsport	Mercedes-AMG GT4	84	(Germany) Bernd Schneider	5
(Germany) Mercedes-AMG Testteam HTP Motorsport	Mercedes-AMG GT4	84	(Germany) Jörg Viebahn	5
(Netherlands) JR Motorsport	BMW 3 Series (E46)	118	(Belgium) Nick Geelen	5
(Netherlands) JR Motorsport	BMW 3 Series (E46)	118	(Netherlands) Marco Poland	5
(Netherlands) JR Motorsport	BMW 3 Series (E46)	118	(Belgium) Ward Sluys	5
(United Kingdom) Moss Motorsport UK	BMW M3 (E46)	136	(United Kingdom) Scot Adam	1
(United Kingdom) Moss Motorsport UK	BMW M3 (E46)	136	(United Kingdom) Barry McMahon	1
(United Kingdom) Moss Motorsport UK	BMW M3 (E46)	136	(United Kingdom) Mike Moss	1
(United Kingdom) Moss Motorsport UK	BMW M3 (E46)	136	(United Kingdom) Chris Murphy	1
(United Kingdom) Moss Motorsport UK	BMW 1 Series M Coupé (E87)	137	(Republic of Ireland) Mark Armstrong	1
(United Kingdom) Moss Motorsport UK	BMW 1 Series M Coupé (E87)	137	(United Kingdom) Tony Morris	1
(United Kingdom) Moss Motorsport UK	BMW 1 Series M Coupé (E87)	137	(United Kingdom) Robert Nearn	1
(United Kingdom) Intersport Racing	BMW M3 CSL (E46)	140	(United Kingdom) Paul Black	1
(United Kingdom) Intersport Racing	BMW M3 CSL (E46)	140	(United Kingdom) Kevin Clarke	1
(United Kingdom) Intersport Racing	BMW M3 CSL (E46)	140	(United Kingdom) Adam Hayes	1
(United Kingdom) Intersport Racing	BMW M3 CSL (E46)	140	(United Kingdom) Ryan Lindsay	1
(Belgium) Red Ant Racing	BMW M3 (E92)	157	(Belgium) Tom Boonen	4
(Belgium) Red Ant Racing	BMW M3 (E92)	157	(Belgium) Bert Redant	4
(Belgium) Red Ant Racing	BMW M3 (E92)	157	(Belgium) Jens Verbesselt	4
(Belgium) Red Ant Racing	BMW M3 (E92)	157	(Belgium) Michiel Verhaeren	4
(United Kingdom) Endurance Autosport	Lotus Exige (S1)	174	(United Kingdom) Adam Bewsey	1
(United Kingdom) Endurance Autosport	Lotus Exige (S1)	174	(United Kingdom) Tom Bradshaw	1
(United Kingdom) Endurance Autosport	Lotus Exige (S1)	174	(United Kingdom) Andrew Dolan	1
(United Kingdom) Endurance Autosport	Lotus Exige (S1)	174	(United Kingdom) Daniel Plant	1
(United Kingdom) Endurance Autosport	Lotus Exige (S1)	174	(Japan) Yuji Shinohara	1
(United Kingdom) CWS	Ginetta G55 GT4	178	(Denmark) Patrik Matthiesen	All
(United Kingdom) CWS	Ginetta G55 GT4	178	(France) Philippe Salini	1–2
(United Kingdom) CWS	Ginetta G55 GT4	178	(United Kingdom) Colin White	1, 3–5
(United Kingdom) CWS	Ginetta G55 GT4	178	(United Kingdom) Martin Thomas	1
(United Kingdom) CWS	Ginetta G55 GT4	178	(United Kingdom) JM Littman	2
(United Kingdom) CWS	Ginetta G55 GT4	178	(United Kingdom) Nick Adcock	3
(United Kingdom) CWS	Ginetta G55 GT4	178	(United States) Jason Coupal	3
(United Kingdom) CWS	Ginetta G55 GT4	178	(Germany) Joachim Bölting	4
(United Kingdom) CWS	Ginetta G55 GT4	178	(United Kingdom) Tom Wrigley	4
(France) Vortex V6	GC Automobile GC10-V6	205	(Switzerland) Stephane Jaggi	2, 4
(France) Vortex V6	GC Automobile GC10-V6	205	(France) Matthieu Lecuyer	2, 4
(France) Vortex V6	GC Automobile GC10-V6	205	(Switzerland) Léonard Vernet	2, 4
(France) Vortex V6	GC Automobile GC10-V6	205	(France) Olivier Gomez	2
(France) Vortex V6	GC Automobile GC10-V6	205	(France) Jean Christophe Rey	4
(France) Vortex V6	GC Automobile GC10-V6	252	(France) Lionel Amrouche	4
(France) Vortex V6	GC Automobile GC10-V6	252	(France) Cyril Calmon	4
(France) Vortex V6	GC Automobile GC10-V6	252	(France) Stephane Cottrell	4
(France) Vortex V6	GC Automobile GC10-V6	252	(France) Philippe Gruau	4
(Germany) Mercedes-AMG Testteam Uwe Alzen Automotive	Mercedes-AMG GT4	211	(Germany) Fabian Hamprecht	5
(Germany) Mercedes-AMG Testteam Uwe Alzen Automotive	Mercedes-AMG GT4	211	(Germany) Christian Hohenadel	5
(Germany) Mercedes-AMG Testteam Uwe Alzen Automotive	Mercedes-AMG GT4	211	(United States) Chris Tiger	5
(Germany) Mercedes-AMG Testteam Uwe Alzen Automotive	Mercedes-AMG GT4	211	(Germany) Mike Stursberg	5
(Spain) NM Racing Team	Ginetta G55 GT4	215	(Russia) Nikolay Dmitriev	4
(Spain) NM Racing Team	Ginetta G55 GT4	215	(Spain) Marc de Fulgencio	4
(Spain) NM Racing Team	Ginetta G55 GT4	215	(France) Maxime Guillemat	4
(Spain) NM Racing Team	Ginetta G55 GT4	215	(Spain) Nil Montserrat	4
(Spain) NM Racing Team	Ginetta G55 GT4	215	(Spain) Ivan Pareras	4
(Czech Republic) RTR Projects	KTM X-Bow GT4	221	(Austria) Eike Angermayr	5
(Czech Republic) RTR Projects	KTM X-Bow GT4	221	(Czech Republic) Erik Janiš	5
(Czech Republic) RTR Projects	KTM X-Bow GT4	221	(Czech Republic) Sergej Pavlovec	5
(Czech Republic) RTR Projects	KTM X-Bow GT4	221	(Czech Republic) Daniel Skalický	5
(Czech Republic) RTR Projects	KTM X-Bow GT4	223	(Czech Republic) Karel Bednar	5
(Czech Republic) RTR Projects	KTM X-Bow GT4	223	(Czech Republic) Erik Janiš	5
(Czech Republic) RTR Projects	KTM X-Bow GT4	223	(Czech Republic) Tomas Miniberger	5
(Czech Republic) RTR Projects	KTM X-Bow GT4	223	(Czech Republic) Sergej Pavlovec	5
(Belgium) Semspeed	Peugeot 308 Racing Cup	226	(Belgium) Anthony Lambert	2–5
(Belgium) Semspeed	Peugeot 308 Racing Cup	226	(Belgium) Benoît Semoulin	2–5
(Belgium) Semspeed	Peugeot 308 Racing Cup	226	(Belgium) François Semoulin	2–5
(Belgium) Semspeed	Peugeot 308 Racing Cup	226	(Belgium) Pierre Dupont	3
(Belgium) Semspeed	Peugeot 308 Racing Cup	226	(Belgium) Geoffrey Heyninck	4
(United Kingdom) Team ABBA with Rollcentre Racing	BMW M3 V8 (E46)	234	(United Kingdom) Graham Coomes	1, 5
(United Kingdom) Team ABBA with Rollcentre Racing	BMW M3 V8 (E46)	234	(United Kingdom) Richard Neary	1, 5
(United Kingdom) Team ABBA with Rollcentre Racing	BMW M3 V8 (E46)	234	(United Kingdom) Ian Stinton	1, 5
(United Kingdom) Team ABBA with Rollcentre Racing	BMW M3 V8 (E46)	234	(United Kingdom) Martin Short	1
(United Kingdom) Stratton Motorsport	Aston Martin Vantage GT4	237	(United Kingdom) Tom Black	4
(United Kingdom) Stratton Motorsport	Aston Martin Vantage GT4	237	(United Kingdom) Stuart Hall	4
(United Kingdom) Stratton Motorsport	Aston Martin Vantage GT4	237	(United Kingdom) Robin Marriott	4
(United Kingdom) Stratton Motorsport	Aston Martin Vantage GT4	237	(United Kingdom) David Tinn	4
(Denmark) Perfection Racing Europe	Ginetta G55 GT4	239	(Denmark) Claus Klostermann	5
(Denmark) Perfection Racing Europe	Ginetta G55 GT4	239	(Denmark) Michael Klostermann	5
(United Kingdom) TDF/GEVA	Ginetta G50 GT4	248	(Netherlands) Melroy Heemskerk	1
(United Kingdom) TDF/GEVA	Ginetta G50 GT4	248	(Belgium) Sven van Laere	1
(United Kingdom) TDF/GEVA	Ginetta G50 GT4	248	(United Kingdom) Michael Lyons	1
(United Kingdom) TDF/GEVA	Ginetta G50 GT4	248	(Republic of Ireland) Niall Murray	1
(Belgium) Speed Lover	Porsche Cayman GT4 Clubsport	251	(United States) Dominique Bastien	4
(Belgium) Speed Lover	Porsche Cayman GT4 Clubsport	251	(Spain) Jaime Carbo	4
(Belgium) Speed Lover	Porsche Cayman GT4 Clubsport	251	(Spain) Jesús Diez Villaroel	4
(Belgium) Speed Lover	Porsche Cayman GT4 Clubsport	251	(Spain) José Manuel de los Milagros	4
(Belgium) Speed Lover	Porsche Cayman GT4 Clubsport	251	(Luxembourg) Carlos Rivas	4
(Italy) BRC Racing Team	Hyundai i30 N TCR	253	(Italy) Nicola Berutti	3
(Italy) BRC Racing Team	Hyundai i30 N TCR	253	(Finland) Antti Buri	3
(Italy) BRC Racing Team	Hyundai i30 N TCR	253	(Italy) Gabriele Tarquini	3
(Netherlands) Munckhof Racing	BMW M4 GT4	259	(Netherlands) Eric van den Munckhof	5
(Netherlands) Munckhof Racing	BMW M4 GT4	259	(Netherlands) Henry Zumbrink	5
(South Africa) Team Africa Le Mans	Ginetta G55 GT4	555	(Netherlands) Jan Lammers	3
(South Africa) Team Africa Le Mans	Ginetta G55 GT4	555	(South Africa) Sarel van der Merwe	3
(South Africa) Team Africa Le Mans	Ginetta G55 GT4	555	(South Africa) Greg Mills	3
(South Africa) Team Africa Le Mans	Ginetta G55 GT4	555	(Italy) Emanuele Pirro	3
(South Africa) Team Africa Le Mans	Ginetta G55 GT4	555	(South Africa) Graham Vos	3
(Hong Kong) GDL Racing Team Asia	Porsche Cayman GT4 Clubsport MR	267	(Hong Kong) Antares Au	4
(Hong Kong) GDL Racing Team Asia	Porsche Cayman GT4 Clubsport MR	267	(Hong Kong) Jonathan Hui	4
(Hong Kong) GDL Racing Team Asia	Porsche Cayman GT4 Clubsport MR	267	(Macau) Kevin Tse	4
(Hong Kong) GDL Racing Team Asia	Porsche Cayman GT4 Clubsport MR	267	(Hong Kong) Frank Yu	4
Endurance Team Romania	Ginetta G50 GT4	446	(Italy) Fabrizio Broggi	4
Endurance Team Romania	Ginetta G50 GT4	446	(Romania) Mihai Costin	4
Endurance Team Romania	Ginetta G50 GT4	446	(United States) Kenneth Mantovani	4
Endurance Team Romania	Ginetta G50 GT4	446	(Romania) Sergiu Nicolae	4
Endurance Team Romania	Ginetta G50 GT4	446	(Romania) Stefan Unchiasu	4
(Estonia) EST 1 Racing	Porsche Cayman GT4 Clubsport	981	(Finland) Jukka Honkavuori	4
(Estonia) EST 1 Racing	Porsche Cayman GT4 Clubsport	981	(Estonia) Keijo Kaasik	4
(Estonia) EST 1 Racing	Porsche Cayman GT4 Clubsport	981	(Estonia) Raimo Kulli	4
(Estonia) EST 1 Racing	Porsche Cayman GT4 Clubsport	981	(Estonia) Thomas Padovani	4
(Estonia) EST 1 Racing	Porsche Cayman GT4 Clubsport	981	(Estonia) Sten Pentus	4
TCR
(Spain) Baporo - KH7	SEAT León TCR	7	(Spain) Jaime Font Casas	4
(Spain) Baporo - KH7	SEAT León TCR	7	(Spain) Francesc Gutiérrez Agüi	4
(Spain) Baporo - KH7	SEAT León TCR	7	(Spain) Laia Sanz	4
(Spain) Baporo - KH7	SEAT León TCR	7	(Andorra) Joan Vinyes	4
(Netherlands) Team Bleekemolen	SEAT León TCR	100	(Netherlands) Sebastiaan Bleekemolen	1, 4
(Netherlands) Team Bleekemolen	SEAT León TCR	100	(Netherlands) Melvin de Groot	1, 4
(Netherlands) Team Bleekemolen	SEAT León TCR	100	(Netherlands) Rene Steenmetz	1, 4
(Netherlands) Team Bleekemolen	SEAT León TCR	100	(United Kingdom) Robert Smith	1
(Netherlands) Team Bleekemolen	SEAT León TCR	100	(Netherlands) Michael Bleekemolen	4
(Switzerland) Capricorn Racing	Honda Civic TCR	101	(Switzerland) Patrik Meier	2–3
(Switzerland) Capricorn Racing	Honda Civic TCR	101	(Switzerland) Hans Peter Stiffler	2–3
(Switzerland) Capricorn Racing	Honda Civic TCR	101	(Switzerland) Yanik Stiffler	2–3
(Switzerland) Capricorn Racing	Honda Civic TCR	101	(Switzerland) Claudio Truffer	2–3
(Denmark) Holmgaard Motorsport	SEAT León Cup Racer	102	(Norway) Roy Edland	1, 5
(Denmark) Holmgaard Motorsport	SEAT León Cup Racer	102	(Denmark) Jonas Holmgaard	1, 5
(Denmark) Holmgaard Motorsport	SEAT León Cup Racer	102	(Denmark) Magnus Holmgaard	1, 5
(Denmark) Holmgaard Motorsport	SEAT León Cup Racer	102	(Denmark) Per Poulsen	1
(Denmark) Holmgaard Motorsport	SEAT León Cup Racer	102	(Hong Kong) Ivan Szeto	1
(Denmark) Holmgaard Motorsport	SEAT León Cup Racer	102	(Germany) Wolfgang Haugg	5
(Switzerland) TTC Racing	SEAT León TCR	103	(Austria) Klaus Kresnik	2, 4
(Switzerland) TTC Racing	SEAT León TCR	103	(Switzerland) Daniel Schilliger	2, 4
(Switzerland) TTC Racing	SEAT León TCR	103	(Switzerland) Adrian Spescha	4
(Switzerland) TTC Racing	SEAT León TCR	103	(Switzerland) Fredy Suter	4
(United Kingdom) Zest Racecar Engineering	SEAT León TCR	105	(United States) Chris Allen	1
(United Kingdom) Zest Racecar Engineering	SEAT León TCR	105	(United States) Lance Bergstein	1
(United Kingdom) Zest Racecar Engineering	SEAT León TCR	105	(United States) Jon Miller	1
(United Kingdom) Zest Racecar Engineering	SEAT León TCR	105	(United Kingdom) Robert Taylor	1
(United Kingdom) Zest Racecar Engineering	SEAT León TCR	105	(North Macedonia) Viktor Davidovski	5
(United Kingdom) Zest Racecar Engineering	SEAT León TCR	105	(Bosnia and Herzegovina) Boris Miljevic	5
(United Kingdom) Zest Racecar Engineering	SEAT León TCR	105	(India) Prashanth Tharani	5
(Spain) MONLAU COMPETICION	SEAT León TCR	107	(Spain) Alba Cano Ramirez	All
(Spain) MONLAU COMPETICION	SEAT León TCR	107	(Spain) José Manuel Pérez-Aicart	All
(Spain) MONLAU COMPETICION	SEAT León TCR	107	(Spain) Jürgen Smet	All
(Spain) MONLAU COMPETICION	SEAT León TCR	107	(Spain) Alvaro Bajo	1–2, 4–5
(Spain) MONLAU COMPETICION	SEAT León TCR	107	(Spain) Jaime Font Casas	3
(United Kingdom) CadSpeed Racing	Audi RS3 LMS TCR	108	(United Kingdom) Peter Cate	5
(United Kingdom) CadSpeed Racing	Audi RS3 LMS TCR	108	(United Kingdom) James Cottingham	5
(United Kingdom) CadSpeed Racing	Audi RS3 LMS TCR	108	(United Kingdom) James Kaye	5
(United Kingdom) CadSpeed Racing	Audi RS3 LMS TCR	108	(United Kingdom) Mark Lemmer	5
(Spain) Speed Factory Racing	Audi RS3 LMS TCR	109	(Spain) Miguel Abello	4
(Spain) Speed Factory Racing	Audi RS3 LMS TCR	109	(Spain) Jaime Fuster	4
(Spain) Speed Factory Racing	Audi RS3 LMS TCR	109	(Spain) Jesús Fuster	4
(Spain) Speed Factory Racing	Audi RS3 LMS TCR	109	(Netherlands) Mirco van Oostrum	4
(Spain) Speed Factory Racing	Audi RS3 LMS TCR	109	(United Kingdom) Michael Vergers	4
(Sweden) Lestrup Racing Team	Volkswagen Golf GTI TCR	110	(Sweden) Peter Fahlström	1, 5
(Sweden) Lestrup Racing Team	Volkswagen Golf GTI TCR	110	(Sweden) Mats Olsson	1, 5
(Sweden) Lestrup Racing Team	Volkswagen Golf GTI TCR	110	(Sweden) Robin Fredriksson	1
(Sweden) Lestrup Racing Team	Volkswagen Golf GTI TCR	110	(Sweden) Stefan Nilsson	1
(Sweden) Lestrup Racing Team	Volkswagen Golf GTI TCR	110	(Sweden) Jesper Nilsson	5
(Sweden) Lestrup Racing Team	Volkswagen Golf GTI TCR	110	(Sweden) Carl Thunberg	5
(Germany) Bonk Motorsport	Audi RS3 LMS TCR	115	(Germany) Hermann Bock	4
(Germany) Bonk Motorsport	Audi RS3 LMS TCR	115	(United Kingdom) Philip Ellis	4
(Germany) Bonk Motorsport	Audi RS3 LMS TCR	115	(Germany) Max Partl	4
(Germany) Bonk Motorsport	Audi RS3 LMS TCR	127	(Germany) Michael Bonk	4
(Germany) Bonk Motorsport	Audi RS3 LMS TCR	127	(Germany) Axel Burghardt	4
(Germany) Bonk Motorsport	Audi RS3 LMS TCR	127	(Germany) Volker Piepmeyer	4
(Finland) LMS Racing powered by Bas Koeten (Note: Car No. 119 entered as LMS Racing Powered by Bas Koeten, car No. 125 entered as NKPP Racing by Bas Koeten Racing, car No. 155 entered as Bas Koeten Racing powered by Kawasaki and car No. 175 entered as Bas Koeten Racing.) (Netherlands) NKPP Racing by Bas Koeten Racing (Netherlands) Bas Koeten Racing powered by Kawasaki (Netherlands) Bas Koeten Racing	SEAT León TCR	119	(Finland) Antti Buri	5
(Finland) LMS Racing powered by Bas Koeten (Netherlands) NKPP Racing by Bas Koeten Racing (Netherlands) Bas Koeten Racing powered by Kawasaki (Netherlands) Bas Koeten Racing	SEAT León TCR	119	(Finland) Olli Kangas	5
(Finland) LMS Racing powered by Bas Koeten (Netherlands) NKPP Racing by Bas Koeten Racing (Netherlands) Bas Koeten Racing powered by Kawasaki (Netherlands) Bas Koeten Racing	SEAT León TCR	119	(Finland) Kari-Pekka Laaksonen	5
(Finland) LMS Racing powered by Bas Koeten (Netherlands) NKPP Racing by Bas Koeten Racing (Netherlands) Bas Koeten Racing powered by Kawasaki (Netherlands) Bas Koeten Racing	SEAT León TCR	125	(Netherlands) Gijs Bessem	2–5
(Finland) LMS Racing powered by Bas Koeten (Netherlands) NKPP Racing by Bas Koeten Racing (Netherlands) Bas Koeten Racing powered by Kawasaki (Netherlands) Bas Koeten Racing	SEAT León TCR	125	(Netherlands) Harry Hilders	2–5
(Finland) LMS Racing powered by Bas Koeten (Netherlands) NKPP Racing by Bas Koeten Racing (Netherlands) Bas Koeten Racing powered by Kawasaki (Netherlands) Bas Koeten Racing	SEAT León TCR	125	(Netherlands) Rob Rappange	3–4
(Finland) LMS Racing powered by Bas Koeten (Netherlands) NKPP Racing by Bas Koeten Racing (Netherlands) Bas Koeten Racing powered by Kawasaki (Netherlands) Bas Koeten Racing	SEAT León TCR	125	(Netherlands) Willem Meijer	3
(Finland) LMS Racing powered by Bas Koeten (Netherlands) NKPP Racing by Bas Koeten Racing (Netherlands) Bas Koeten Racing powered by Kawasaki (Netherlands) Bas Koeten Racing	SEAT León TCR	125	(United Kingdom) Ramzi Moutran	4
(Finland) LMS Racing powered by Bas Koeten (Netherlands) NKPP Racing by Bas Koeten Racing (Netherlands) Bas Koeten Racing powered by Kawasaki (Netherlands) Bas Koeten Racing	SEAT León TCR	155	(Denmark) Kristian Jepsen	2–5
(Finland) LMS Racing powered by Bas Koeten (Netherlands) NKPP Racing by Bas Koeten Racing (Netherlands) Bas Koeten Racing powered by Kawasaki (Netherlands) Bas Koeten Racing	SEAT León TCR	155	(Denmark) Jan Sørensen	2–5
(Finland) LMS Racing powered by Bas Koeten (Netherlands) NKPP Racing by Bas Koeten Racing (Netherlands) Bas Koeten Racing powered by Kawasaki (Netherlands) Bas Koeten Racing	SEAT León TCR	155	(Denmark) Morten Jepsen	2
(Finland) LMS Racing powered by Bas Koeten (Netherlands) NKPP Racing by Bas Koeten Racing (Netherlands) Bas Koeten Racing powered by Kawasaki (Netherlands) Bas Koeten Racing	SEAT León TCR	155	(Russia) Maxim Aronov	3
(Finland) LMS Racing powered by Bas Koeten (Netherlands) NKPP Racing by Bas Koeten Racing (Netherlands) Bas Koeten Racing powered by Kawasaki (Netherlands) Bas Koeten Racing	SEAT León TCR	155	(Russia) Lev Fridman	3
(Finland) LMS Racing powered by Bas Koeten (Netherlands) NKPP Racing by Bas Koeten Racing (Netherlands) Bas Koeten Racing powered by Kawasaki (Netherlands) Bas Koeten Racing	SEAT León TCR	155	(Netherlands) Martin van den Berge	4
(Finland) LMS Racing powered by Bas Koeten (Netherlands) NKPP Racing by Bas Koeten Racing (Netherlands) Bas Koeten Racing powered by Kawasaki (Netherlands) Bas Koeten Racing	SEAT León TCR	155	(Denmark) Anders Fjordbach	4
(Finland) LMS Racing powered by Bas Koeten (Netherlands) NKPP Racing by Bas Koeten Racing (Netherlands) Bas Koeten Racing powered by Kawasaki (Netherlands) Bas Koeten Racing	SEAT León TCR	175	(Russia) Maxim Aronov	4–5
(Finland) LMS Racing powered by Bas Koeten (Netherlands) NKPP Racing by Bas Koeten Racing (Netherlands) Bas Koeten Racing powered by Kawasaki (Netherlands) Bas Koeten Racing	SEAT León TCR	175	(Russia) Lev Fridman	4–5
(Finland) LMS Racing powered by Bas Koeten (Netherlands) NKPP Racing by Bas Koeten Racing (Netherlands) Bas Koeten Racing powered by Kawasaki (Netherlands) Bas Koeten Racing	SEAT León TCR	175	(Netherlands) Niels Bouwhuis	4
(Finland) LMS Racing powered by Bas Koeten (Netherlands) NKPP Racing by Bas Koeten Racing (Netherlands) Bas Koeten Racing powered by Kawasaki (Netherlands) Bas Koeten Racing	SEAT León TCR	175	(Netherlands) Danny Kroes	4
(Finland) LMS Racing powered by Bas Koeten (Netherlands) NKPP Racing by Bas Koeten Racing (Netherlands) Bas Koeten Racing powered by Kawasaki (Netherlands) Bas Koeten Racing	SEAT León TCR	175	(Netherlands) Paul Sieljes	4
(Finland) LMS Racing powered by Bas Koeten (Netherlands) NKPP Racing by Bas Koeten Racing (Netherlands) Bas Koeten Racing powered by Kawasaki (Netherlands) Bas Koeten Racing	SEAT León TCR	175	(Netherlands) Martin van den Berge	5
(Finland) LMS Racing powered by Bas Koeten (Netherlands) NKPP Racing by Bas Koeten Racing (Netherlands) Bas Koeten Racing powered by Kawasaki (Netherlands) Bas Koeten Racing	SEAT León TCR	175	(Belgium) Sven van Laere	5
(United Kingdom) SICL.com	SEAT León Cup Racer	120	(United Kingdom) Carey Lewis	4–5
(United Kingdom) SICL.com	SEAT León Cup Racer	120	(United Kingdom) Frank Pettitt	4–5
(United Kingdom) SICL.com	SEAT León Cup Racer	120	(United Kingdom) Ashley Woodman	4–5
(United Kingdom) SICL.com	SEAT León Cup Racer	120	(United Kingdom) Graham Davidson	4
(United Kingdom) track-club	SEAT León TCR	121	(United Kingdom) Simon Atkinson	1
(United Kingdom) track-club	SEAT León TCR	121	(United Kingdom) Andrew Gordon-Colebrooke	1
(United Kingdom) track-club	SEAT León TCR	121	(Australia) Cody Hill	1
(United Kingdom) track-club	SEAT León TCR	121	(United Kingdom) Marcus Jewell	1
(Italy) Pit Lane Competizioni	Audi RS3 LMS TCR	122	(United States) Zach Arnold	1–4
(Italy) Pit Lane Competizioni	Audi RS3 LMS TCR	122	(Italy) Roberto Ferri	1–4
(Italy) Pit Lane Competizioni	Audi RS3 LMS TCR	122	(France) John Filippi	1–4
(Italy) Pit Lane Competizioni	Audi RS3 LMS TCR	122	(Italy) Alberto Vescovi	1–4
(Italy) Pit Lane Competizioni	Audi RS3 LMS TCR	122	(Italy) Enrico Bettera	1
(Italy) Pit Lane Competizioni	Audi RS3 LMS TCR	122	(Italy) Ivan Benvenuti	3
Insightracing Denmark	Honda Civic TCR	124	(Sweden) Joakim Frid	4
Insightracing Denmark	Honda Civic TCR	124	(Denmark) Martin Jensen	4
Insightracing Denmark	Honda Civic TCR	124	(Denmark) Jacob Mathiassen	4
Insightracing Denmark	Honda Civic TCR	124	(Norway) Marcus Påverud	4
(United Kingdom) RS Connect	SEAT León Cup Racer	144	(United Kingdom) Lea Hodson	1
(United Kingdom) RS Connect	SEAT León Cup Racer	144	(United Kingdom) Adam Jones	1
(United Kingdom) RS Connect	SEAT León Cup Racer	144	(United Kingdom) Gavin Jones	1
(United Kingdom) RS Connect	SEAT León Cup Racer	144	(United Kingdom) Neil Stothert	1
(Belgium) Motorsport-International	Volkswagen Golf GTI TCR	163	(Belgium) Vincent Despriet	5
(Belgium) Motorsport-International	Volkswagen Golf GTI TCR	163	(Belgium) Paul Lejeune	5
(Belgium) Motorsport-International	Volkswagen Golf GTI TCR	163	(Belgium) Grégory Paisse	5
(Hong Kong) Modena Motorsports	SEAT León TCR	216	(Canada) John Shen	1, 4–5
(Hong Kong) Modena Motorsports	SEAT León TCR	216	(Canada) Wayne Shen	1, 4–5
(Hong Kong) Modena Motorsports	SEAT León TCR	216	(Denmark) Benny Simonsen	1, 4–5
(Hong Kong) Modena Motorsports	SEAT León TCR	216	(Netherlands) Francis Tjia	1, 4–5
(Hong Kong) Modena Motorsports	SEAT León TCR	216	(France) Philippe Descombes	1, 4
(Hong Kong) Modena Motorsports	SEAT León TCR	216	(Canada) Christian Chia	5
(Hong Kong) Modena Motorsports	SEAT León TCR	217	(France) Philippe Descombes	1, 4–5
(Hong Kong) Modena Motorsports	SEAT León TCR	217	(Canada) Christian Chia	1, 4–5
(Hong Kong) Modena Motorsports	SEAT León TCR	217	(Indonesia) Michael Soeryadjaya	1, 4–5
(Hong Kong) Modena Motorsports	SEAT León TCR	217	(Netherlands) Marcel Tjia	1, 4–5
(Hong Kong) Modena Motorsports	SEAT León TCR	217	(Denmark) Benny Simonsen	1, 4
(Hong Kong) Modena Motorsports	SEAT León TCR	217	(Netherlands) Francis Tjia	5
(Hong Kong) Modena Motorsports	SEAT León TCR	218	(Canada) John Shen	5
(Hong Kong) Modena Motorsports	SEAT León TCR	218	(Canada) Wayne Shen	5
(Hong Kong) Modena Motorsports	SEAT León TCR	218	(Denmark) Benny Simonsen	5
(Hong Kong) Modena Motorsports	SEAT León TCR	218	(Indonesia) Michael Soeryadjaya	5
(Hong Kong) Modena Motorsports	SEAT León TCR	218	(Netherlands) Marcel Tjia	5
(Austria) Wimmer Werk Motorsport	SEAT León TCR	266	(Liechtenstein) Matthias Kaiser	All
(Austria) Wimmer Werk Motorsport	SEAT León TCR	266	(Austria) Felix Wimmer	All
(Austria) Wimmer Werk Motorsport	SEAT León TCR	266	(Austria) Martin Gasser	1–3
(Austria) Wimmer Werk Motorsport	SEAT León TCR	266	(Austria) Günther Wiesmeier	1
(Austria) Wimmer Werk Motorsport	SEAT León TCR	266	(Austria) Christian Windischberger	1
(Austria) Wimmer Werk Motorsport	SEAT León TCR	266	(Austria) Martin Niedertscheider	2
(Austria) Wimmer Werk Motorsport	SEAT León TCR	266	(Austria) Peter Gross	3–5
(Austria) Wimmer Werk Motorsport	SEAT León TCR	266	(Switzerland) Fredy Barth	4
(Netherlands) Red Camel-Jordans.nl	SEAT León TCR	303	(Netherlands) Ivo Breukers	All
(Netherlands) Red Camel-Jordans.nl	SEAT León TCR	303	(Netherlands) Rik Breukers	1, 3–5
(Netherlands) Red Camel-Jordans.nl	SEAT León TCR	303	(Netherlands) Sjaco Griffioen	1
(Netherlands) Red Camel-Jordans.nl	SEAT León TCR	303	(Austria) Klaus Kresnik	1
(Netherlands) Red Camel-Jordans.nl	SEAT León TCR	303	(United Kingdom) Anthony Morris	2
(Netherlands) Red Camel-Jordans.nl	SEAT León TCR	303	(United Kingdom) Robert Nearn	2
(Netherlands) Red Camel-Jordans.nl	SEAT León TCR	303	(United Kingdom) JM Littman	3–4
(Netherlands) Red Camel-Jordans.nl	SEAT León TCR	303	(Germany) Dirk Vorländer	3
(Netherlands) Red Camel-Jordans.nl	SEAT León TCR	303	(Netherlands) Bert de Heus	4
(Switzerland) Stanco&Tanner Motorsport	SEAT León Cup Racer	312	(Russia) Maxim Aronov	1
(Switzerland) Stanco&Tanner Motorsport	SEAT León Cup Racer	312	(Netherlands) Christian Dijkhof	1
(Switzerland) Stanco&Tanner Motorsport	SEAT León Cup Racer	312	(Russia) Lev Fridman	1
(Switzerland) Stanco&Tanner Motorsport	SEAT León Cup Racer	312	(Netherlands) Michel Schaap	1
(Switzerland) Stanco&Tanner Motorsport	SEAT León Cup Racer	312	(Switzerland) Stefan Tanner	1
(Belgium) AC Motorsport	Audi RS3 LMS TCR	888	(France) Rafael Galiana	4
(Belgium) AC Motorsport	Audi RS3 LMS TCR	888	(France) Marc Guillot	4
(Belgium) AC Motorsport	Audi RS3 LMS TCR	888	(France) Stephane Perrin	4
(Belgium) AC Motorsport	Audi RS3 LMS TCR	888	(Belgium) Vincent Radermecker	4
(Belgium) AC Motorsport	Audi RS3 LMS TCR	888	(France) Jean-Marc Thevenot	4
A3
(Netherlands) Cor Euser Racing	BMW M3 (E46)	71	(United States) James Briody	1
(Netherlands) Cor Euser Racing	BMW M3 (E46)	71	(Netherlands) Cor Euser	1
(Netherlands) Cor Euser Racing	BMW M3 (E46)	71	(Canada) John Farano	1
(Netherlands) Cor Euser Racing	BMW M3 (E46)	71	(Canada) Peter Klutt	1
(Netherlands) Cor Euser Racing	BMW M3 (E46)	71	(Netherlands) Maarten Mus	1
(Belgium) PDM Motorsport	BMW Z3M Coupé	88	(Belgium) Dimitri Kluyskens	5
(Belgium) PDM Motorsport	BMW Z3M Coupé	88	(Belgium) Pierre de Landsheere	5
(Belgium) PDM Motorsport	BMW Z3M Coupé	88	(Belgium) Maxence Vandekerckhove	5
(United Kingdom) RKC/TGM	Honda Civic Type R (FD2)	99	(United Kingdom) Ricky Coomber	4–5
(United Kingdom) RKC/TGM	Honda Civic Type R (FD2)	99	(United Kingdom) David Drinkwater	4–5
(United Kingdom) RKC/TGM	Honda Civic Type R (FD2)	99	(United Kingdom) Thomas Gannon	4–5
(United Kingdom) RKC/TGM	Honda Civic Type R (FD2)	99	(United Kingdom) Andy Mollison	4
(United Kingdom) RKC/TGM	Honda Civic Type R (FD2)	99	(United Kingdom) Mark Symonds	4
(France) MALTI COMPETITION	SEAT León Supercopa (Mk2)	128	(France) Philippe Burel	4–5
(France) MALTI COMPETITION	SEAT León Supercopa (Mk2)	128	(France) Bob Arezina	4
(France) MALTI COMPETITION	SEAT León Supercopa (Mk2)	128	(Portugal) Victor Fernandes	4
(France) MALTI COMPETITION	SEAT León Supercopa (Mk2)	128	(France) Jean-Marc Rivet	4
(France) MALTI COMPETITION	SEAT León Supercopa (Mk2)	128	(France) Dominique Nury	5
(Germany) German Wheels	BMW M3 Coupé (E46)	132	(Germany) Jan C. Kortüm	5
(Germany) German Wheels	BMW M3 Coupé (E46)	132	(Germany) Bernd Küpper	5
(Germany) German Wheels	BMW M3 Coupé (E46)	132	(Germany) Michael Luther	5
(United Kingdom) Excelr8 Motorsport	Mini F56 JCW	134	(United Kingdom) Max Bladon	1
(United Kingdom) Excelr8 Motorsport	Mini F56 JCW	134	(United Kingdom) Stuart Hall	1
(United Kingdom) Excelr8 Motorsport	Mini F56 JCW	134	(United Kingdom) Matt Kelly	1
(United Kingdom) Excelr8 Motorsport	Mini F56 JCW	134	(United Kingdom) Mark Lemmer	1
(United Kingdom) Excelr8 Motorsport	Mini F56 JCW	134	(United Kingdom) Rob Smith	1
(United Kingdom) Vanquish Motorsport	SEAT León Supercopa	138	(Australia) Simon Cresswell	1
(United Kingdom) Vanquish Motorsport	SEAT León Supercopa	138	(United Kingdom) JM Littman	1
(United Kingdom) Vanquish Motorsport	SEAT León Supercopa	138	(United Kingdom) Paul Plant	1
(United Kingdom) Vanquish Motorsport	SEAT León Supercopa	138	(United Kingdom) Chris Yarwood	1
(United Kingdom) WEC Motorsport	BMW M3 Coupé (E46)	139	(United Kingdom) Dave Cox	5
(United Kingdom) WEC Motorsport	BMW M3 Coupé (E46)	139	(United Kingdom) Jason Cox	5
(United Kingdom) WEC Motorsport	BMW M3 Coupé (E46)	139	(United Kingdom) George Haynes	5
(United Kingdom) Kinetic Racing	SEAT León Supercopa (Mk2)	142	(Qatar) Hamad Al Asam	5
(United Kingdom) Kinetic Racing	SEAT León Supercopa (Mk2)	142	(Qatar) Ahmad Al Muhannadi	5
(United Kingdom) Kinetic Racing	SEAT León Supercopa (Mk2)	142	(United Kingdom) Mike Nash	5
(United Kingdom) Kinetic Racing	SEAT León Supercopa (Mk2)	142	(United Kingdom) Graham Saul	5
(United Kingdom) RH Race Engineering	SEAT León Supercopa	147	(New Zealand) Darryl Clarke	2
(United Kingdom) RH Race Engineering	SEAT León Supercopa	147	(Australia) Malcolm Niall	2
(United Kingdom) RH Race Engineering	SEAT León Supercopa	147	(Australia) Mark Pilatti	2
(United Kingdom) Synchro Motorsport	Honda Civic Type R (FK2)	176	(United Kingdom) Martin Byford	1, 4–5
(United Kingdom) Synchro Motorsport	Honda Civic Type R (FK2)	176	(United Kingdom) Alyn James	1, 4–5
(United Kingdom) Synchro Motorsport	Honda Civic Type R (FK2)	176	(United Kingdom) Daniel Wheeler	1, 4–5
(Netherlands) Team Autosport de Jong	BMW 330d (E46)	177	(Netherlands) Marco de Jong	4
(Netherlands) Team Autosport de Jong	BMW 330d (E46)	177	(Netherlands) Karel Neleman	4
(Netherlands) Team Autosport de Jong	BMW 330d (E46)	177	(Netherlands) Peter Terlouw	4
(Netherlands) Team Autosport de Jong	BMW 330d (E46)	177	(Netherlands) Patrick Tieman	4
(Netherlands) Team Autosport de Jong	BMW 330d (E46)	177	(Netherlands) Mark Verhaegh	4
(Denmark) United Project Motorsport	BMW M3 Coupé (E46)	187	(Denmark) Kenneth Londal Pedersen	5
(Denmark) United Project Motorsport	BMW M3 Coupé (E46)	187	(Denmark) Dennis Nymand	5
(Denmark) United Project Motorsport	BMW M3 Coupé (E46)	187	(Denmark) Michael Skipper	5
(Denmark) United Project Motorsport	BMW M3 Coupé (E46)	187	(Denmark) Michael Vesthave	5
CUP1
(Germany) Sorg Rennsport	BMW M235i Racing Cup	151	(United Kingdom) Paul Abercrombie	1
(Germany) Sorg Rennsport	BMW M235i Racing Cup	151	(United Kingdom) Rob Ellice	1
(Germany) Sorg Rennsport	BMW M235i Racing Cup	151	(United Kingdom) William Lucas	1
(Germany) Sorg Rennsport	BMW M235i Racing Cup	151	(United Kingdom) Sam Tordoff	1
(Germany) Sorg Rennsport	BMW M235i Racing Cup	151	(United Kingdom) Kye Wheatley	1
(Germany) Sorg Rennsport	BMW M235i Racing Cup	152	(United Kingdom) James Colborn	5
(Germany) Sorg Rennsport	BMW M235i Racing Cup	152	(United States) Dan Rogers	5
(Germany) Sorg Rennsport	BMW M235i Racing Cup	152	(United States) Seth Thomas	5
(Germany) Sorg Rennsport	BMW M235i Racing Cup	152	(United States) Chris Wadle	5
(Belgium) QSR Racingschool	BMW M235i Racing Cup	154	(Belgium) Jimmy De Breucker	All
(Belgium) QSR Racingschool	BMW M235i Racing Cup	154	(Belgium) Rodrigue Gillion	All
(Belgium) QSR Racingschool	BMW M235i Racing Cup	154	(Belgium) Mario Timmers	All
(Belgium) QSR Racingschool	BMW M235i Racing Cup	154	(Belgium) Jeffrey van Hooydonk	1
(Belgium) QSR Racingschool	BMW M235i Racing Cup	154	(Belgium) Bart van Haeren	3
(Belgium) QSR Racingschool	BMW M235i Racing Cup	154	(Sweden) Tommy Graberg	4
(Belgium) QSR Racingschool	BMW M235i Racing Cup	154	(Sweden) Emilie Liljeström	4
(Belgium) QSR Racingschool	BMW M235i Racing Cup	154	(Belgium) Guillaume Dumarey	5
(Belgium) QSR Racingschool	BMW M235i Racing Cup	161	(Belgium) Jimmy De Breucker	5
(Belgium) QSR Racingschool	BMW M235i Racing Cup	161	(Belgium) Tom Boonen	5
(Belgium) QSR Racingschool	BMW M235i Racing Cup	161	(Belgium) Rodrigue Gillion	5
(Belgium) QSR Racingschool	BMW M235i Racing Cup	161	(Belgium) Mario Timmers	5
(Belgium) QSR Racingschool	BMW M235i Racing Cup	161	(Belgium) Patrick Zeeuws	5
(Belgium) / RMA Track Days - JJ Motorsport (Note: Car No. 156 entered as RMA Track Days - JJ Motorsport and car No. 192 entered as JJ Motorsport.); (Belgium) / JJ Motorsport	BMW M235i Racing Cup	156	(United Kingdom) Jason Baker	1
(Belgium) / RMA Track Days - JJ Motorsport; (Belgium) / JJ Motorsport	BMW M235i Racing Cup	156	(United Kingdom) Leyton Clarke	1
(Belgium) / RMA Track Days - JJ Motorsport; (Belgium) / JJ Motorsport	BMW M235i Racing Cup	156	(United Kingdom) James Little	1
(Belgium) / RMA Track Days - JJ Motorsport; (Belgium) / JJ Motorsport	BMW M235i Racing Cup	156	(United Kingdom) Tony Rodriguez	1
(Belgium) / RMA Track Days - JJ Motorsport; (Belgium) / JJ Motorsport	BMW M235i Racing Cup	156	(United States) Paul Dubinsky	5
(Belgium) / RMA Track Days - JJ Motorsport; (Belgium) / JJ Motorsport	BMW M235i Racing Cup	156	(United States) John Landrum	5
(Belgium) / RMA Track Days - JJ Motorsport; (Belgium) / JJ Motorsport	BMW M235i Racing Cup	156	(United States) Lloyd Read	5
(Belgium) / RMA Track Days - JJ Motorsport; (Belgium) / JJ Motorsport	BMW M235i Racing Cup	192	(Qatar) Mansoor Hamad Al Haijri	5
(Belgium) / RMA Track Days - JJ Motorsport; (Belgium) / JJ Motorsport	BMW M235i Racing Cup	192	(Qatar) Mahmoud Mohd Al Khalef	5
(Belgium) / RMA Track Days - JJ Motorsport; (Belgium) / JJ Motorsport	BMW M235i Racing Cup	192	(Qatar) Abdulla Ali Al Khelaffi	5
(Belgium) Gamsiz motorsport	BMW M235i Racing Cup	162	(Belgium) Hakan Sari	5
(Belgium) Gamsiz motorsport	BMW M235i Racing Cup	162	(Belgium) Recep Sari	5
(Luxembourg) DUWO Racing	BMW M235i Racing Cup	235	(Luxembourg) Jean-Marie Dumont	1, 4–5
(Luxembourg) DUWO Racing	BMW M235i Racing Cup	235	(United States) Alexander W. Wetzlich	1, 4–5
(Luxembourg) DUWO Racing	BMW M235i Racing Cup	235	(United Kingdom) Philip Harris	1
(Luxembourg) DUWO Racing	BMW M235i Racing Cup	235	(United Kingdom) Adrian Watt	1
(Luxembourg) DUWO Racing	BMW M235i Racing Cup	235	(United Kingdom) Chris Wilson	1
(Luxembourg) DUWO Racing	BMW M235i Racing Cup	235	(France) Nicolas Schmit	4–5
(Luxembourg) DUWO Racing	BMW M235i Racing Cup	235	(Russia) Andrey Mukovoz	4
(Luxembourg) DUWO Racing	BMW M235i Racing Cup	235	(Russia) Stanislav Sidoruk	4
(Luxembourg) DUWO Racing	BMW M235i Racing Cup	235	(France) Frédéric Schmit	5
A2
(Denmark) Team Sally Racing	Renault Clio Cup (III)	52	(Denmark) Mads Christensen	1, 5
(Denmark) Team Sally Racing	Renault Clio Cup (III)	52	(Denmark) Steffan Jusjong	1, 5
(Denmark) Team Sally Racing	Renault Clio Cup (III)	52	(Denmark) Martin Sally Pedersen	1, 5
(Denmark) Team Sally Racing	Renault Clio Cup (III)	52	(Denmark) Peter Obel	1
(United Kingdom) Area MS / Owens Endurance	Honda Civic (EP3)	91	(United Kingdom) Jack Fabby	1
(United Kingdom) Area MS / Owens Endurance	Honda Civic (EP3)	91	(United Kingdom) Mark Harris	1
(United Kingdom) Area MS / Owens Endurance	Honda Civic (EP3)	91	(United Kingdom) Carl Swift	1
(United Kingdom) Area MS / Owens Endurance	Honda Civic (EP3)	91	(United Kingdom) David Vincent	1
(Germany) BASTUCK Motorsport	Kia Cee'd GT/R	164	(Germany) Marijan Griebel	5
(Germany) BASTUCK Motorsport	Kia Cee'd GT/R	164	(Germany) Guido Naumann	5
(Germany) BASTUCK Motorsport	Kia Cee'd GT/R	164	(Austria) Bernhard Wagner	5
(Netherlands) Spirit Racing	Renault Clio Cup (III)	168	(Netherlands) Frank Bedorf	4
(Netherlands) Spirit Racing	Renault Clio Cup (III)	168	(Netherlands) Eric van den Munckhof	4
(Netherlands) Spirit Racing	Renault Clio Cup (III)	168	(Netherlands) Rob Nieman	4
(Netherlands) Spirit Racing	Renault Clio Cup (III)	168	(Netherlands) Stan van Oord	4
(Netherlands) Spirit Racing	Renault Clio Cup (III)	168	(Netherlands) Joey van Splunteren	4
(Netherlands) Alders Motorsport	Renault Clio Cup (III)	180	(Netherlands) Lucas Alders	4
(Netherlands) Alders Motorsport	Renault Clio Cup (III)	180	(Spain) Eduard Lázaro	4
(Netherlands) Alders Motorsport	Renault Clio Cup (III)	180	(Netherlands) Rob Noy	4
(Netherlands) Alders Motorsport	Renault Clio Cup (III)	180	(Spain) Fortia Pares	4
(Netherlands) Alders Motorsport	Renault Clio Cup (III)	180	(Switzerland) Stefan Tanner	4
(Denmark) Dan Agro Racing	Renault Clio Cup (III)	185	(Denmark) Søren Jønsson	5
(Denmark) Dan Agro Racing	Renault Clio Cup (III)	185	(Denmark) Lars Mogensen	5
(Denmark) Dan Agro Racing	Renault Clio Cup (III)	185	(Denmark) Henrik Sørensen	5
D1
(Netherlands) Cor Euser Racing	BMW 120d (E87)	71	(United States) Jim Briody	4
(Netherlands) Cor Euser Racing	BMW 120d (E87)	71	(Netherlands) Cor Euser	4
(Netherlands) Cor Euser Racing	BMW 120d (E87)	71	(Netherlands) Carel Krieger	4
(Netherlands) Cor Euser Racing	BMW 120d (E87)	71	(Netherlands) Stan van Oord	4
(Austria) Winkler Tuning	BMW 320d (E46)	167	(Austria) Markus Mair	2, 4
(Austria) Winkler Tuning	BMW 320d (E46)	167	(Austria) Markus Reitbauer	2, 4
(Austria) Winkler Tuning	BMW 320d (E46)	167	(Austria) Michael Winkler	2, 4
(Austria) Winkler Tuning	BMW 320d (E46)	167	(Austria) Michael Rienhoff	4
(Belgium) Heli Racing	BMW 120d (E87)	191	(Belgium) Wim Bradt	5
(Belgium) Heli Racing	BMW 120d (E87)	191	(Belgium) Linus Christiaens	5
(Belgium) Heli Racing	BMW 120d (E87)	191	(Belgium) Gunther van den Hove	5
(Belgium) RECY RACING TEAM	BMW 120d (E87)	194	(Belgium) Wim Meulders	4
(Belgium) RECY RACING TEAM	BMW 120d (E87)	194	(Belgium) Johan van Loo	4
(Belgium) RECY RACING TEAM	BMW 120d (E87)	194	(Belgium) Thomas Piessens	4
(Belgium) RECY RACING TEAM	BMW 120d (E87)	194	(Belgium) Jan de Vocht	4
(Netherlands) HTM Racing	Volkswagen Golf TDI Cup (Mk5)	222	(Switzerland) Andreas Kempf	5
(Netherlands) HTM Racing	Volkswagen Golf TDI Cup (Mk5)	222	(Netherlands) Monny Krant	5
(Netherlands) HTM Racing	Volkswagen Golf TDI Cup (Mk5)	222	(Netherlands) Henk Thijssen	5

== Results and standings ==
=== Race results ===
Bold indicates overall winner.

Classes	(United Kingdom) Silverstone (Round 1)	(France) Magny-Cours (Round 2)	(Italy) Misano (Round 3)	(Spain) Barcelona (Round 4)	(Belgium) Spa-Francorchamps (Round 5)
SP3-GT4 Winners	(United Kingdom) No. 136 Moss Motorsport UK	(United Kingdom) No. 178 CWS	(Belgium) No. 226 Semspeed	(Spain) **No. 215 NM Racing Team**	(Germany) No. 211 Mercedes-AMG Testteam; Uwe Alzen Automotive
SP3-GT4 Winners	(United Kingdom) Scot Adams (United Kingdom) Barry McMahon (United Kingdom) Mike Moss (United Kingdom) Chris Murphy	(United Kingdom) JM Littman (Denmark) Patrik Matthiesen (France) Philippe Salini	(Belgium) Pierre Dupont (Belgium) Anthony Lambert (Belgium) Benoît Semoulin (Belgium) François Semoulin	(Russia) **Nikolay Dmitriev** **(Spain) Marc de Fulgencio** **(France) Maxime Guillemat** **(Spain) Nil Montserrat** **(Spain) Ivan Pareras**	(Germany) Fabian Hamprecht (Germany) Christian Hohenadel (United States) Chris Tiger (Germany) Mike Stursberg
TCR Winners	(Netherlands) **No. 100 Team Bleekemolen**	(Spain) **No. 107 MONLAU COMPETICION**	(Spain) **No. 107 MONLAU COMPETICION**	(Netherlands) No. 100 Team Bleekemolen	(Finland) **No. 119 LMS Racing** **powered by Bas Koeten**
TCR Winners	(Netherlands) **Sebastiaan Bleekemolen** **(Netherlands) Melvin de Groot** **(United Kingdom) Robert Smith** **(Netherlands) Rene Steenmetz**	(Spain) **Alvaro Bajo** **(Spain) Alba Cano Ramirez** **(Spain) José Manuel Pérez-Aicart**	(Spain) **Alba Cano Ramirez** **(Spain) Jaime Font Casas** **(Spain) José Manuel Pérez-Aicart** **(Belgium) Jürgen Smet**	(Netherlands) Sebastiaan Bleekemolen (Netherlands) Michael Bleekemolen (Netherlands) Melvin de Groot (Netherlands) Rene Steenmetz	(Finland) **Antti Buri** **(Finland) Olli Kangas** **(Finland) Kari-Pekka Laaksonen**
A3 Winners	(United Kingdom) No. 176 Synchro Motorsport	(Belgium) No. 154 QSR Racingschool	No entries	(United Kingdom) No. 176 Synchro Motorsport	(Germany) No. 132 German Wheels
A3 Winners	(United Kingdom) Martin Byford (United Kingdom) Alyn James (United Kingdom) Daniel Wheeler	(Belgium) Jimmy De Breucker (Belgium) Rodrigue Gillion (Belgium) Mario Timmers	No entries	(United Kingdom) Martin Byford (United Kingdom) Alyn James (United Kingdom) Daniel Wheeler	(Germany) Jan C. Kortüm (Germany) Bernd Küpper (Germany) Michael Luther
CUP1 Winners	(Belgium) No. 154 QSR Racingschool	Merged with A3 class	(Belgium) No. 154 QSR Racingschool	(Luxembourg) No. 235 DUWO Racing	(Belgium) No. 192 JJ Motorsport
CUP1 Winners	(Belgium) Jimmy De Breucker (Belgium) Rodrigue Gillion (Belgium) Jeffrey van Hooydonk (Belgium) Mario Timmers	Merged with A3 class	(Belgium) Jimmy De Breucker (Belgium) Rodrigue Gillion (Belgium) Bart van Haeren (Belgium) Mario Timmers	(Luxembourg) Jean-Marie Dumont (Russia) Andrey Mukovoz (France) Nicolas Schmit (Russia) Stanislav Sidoruk (United States) Alexander W. Wetzlich	(Qatar) Mansoor Hamad Al Haijri (Qatar) Mahmoud Mohd Al Khalef (Qatar) Mansoor Hamad Al Haijri
A2 Winners	(Denmark) No. 52 Team Sally Racing	No entries		(Netherlands) No. 71 Cor Euser Racing	(Denmark) No. 52 Team Sally Racing
A2 Winners	(Denmark) Mads Christensen (Denmark) Steffan Jusjong (Denmark) Peter Obel (Denmark) Martin Sally Pedersen	No entries		(United States) Jim Briody (Netherlands) Cor Euser (Netherlands) Carel Krieger (Netherlands) Stan van Oord	(Denmark) Mads Christensen (Denmark) Steffan Jusjong (Denmark) Martin Sally Pedersen
D1 Winners	No entries	(Austria) No. 167 Winkler Tuning	No entries	Merged with A2 class	
D1 Winners	No entries	(Austria) Markus Mair (Austria) Markus Reitbauer (Austria) Michael Winkler	No entries	Merged with A2 class	

== See also ==
- 24H Series
- 2017 24H Series
- 2017 24H Proto Series
