= Touring Car Endurance Series =

Car racing series

- Category: Touring cars Endurance racing
- Country: Europe
- Inaugural season: 2016
- Tyre suppliers: Hankook
- Official website: www.24hseries.com

The Touring Car Endurance Series (abbreviated as TCES) or 24H TCE Series (since 2018) is a touring car racing series developed by Creventic and with approval from the Fédération Internationale de l'Automobile (FIA). The calendar consists only of 24-hour and 12-hour races.

== Creventic ==
Dutch agency Creventic is the organiser and promoter of the series. Their goals are to organise races with "low costs, a convivial atmosphere with teams and drivers from all over the world and fair competition on the track." In co-operation with the Dutch National Racing Team (DNRT) – one of the biggest motorsport organisations of the Benelux – they organised the inaugural Dubai 24 Hour in 2006.
Creventic is also the organiser of the 24H Series. In 2016 the calendar features three races and one of those is the 24H Silverstone which is both part of the 24H Series and the TCES. Although GT-cars are eligible to enter every 24H Series race, the 24H Silverstone is an exception and is for touring cars only.

== Seasons ==
- 2016 Touring Car Endurance Series
- 2017 Touring Car Endurance Series
- 2018 24H TCE Series
- 2019 24H TCE Series
- 2020 24H TCE Series
- 2021 24H TCE Series
- 2022 24H TCE Series
- 2023 24H TCE Series

== See also ==
- 24H Series
