= Matthieu Lecuyer =

French racing driver

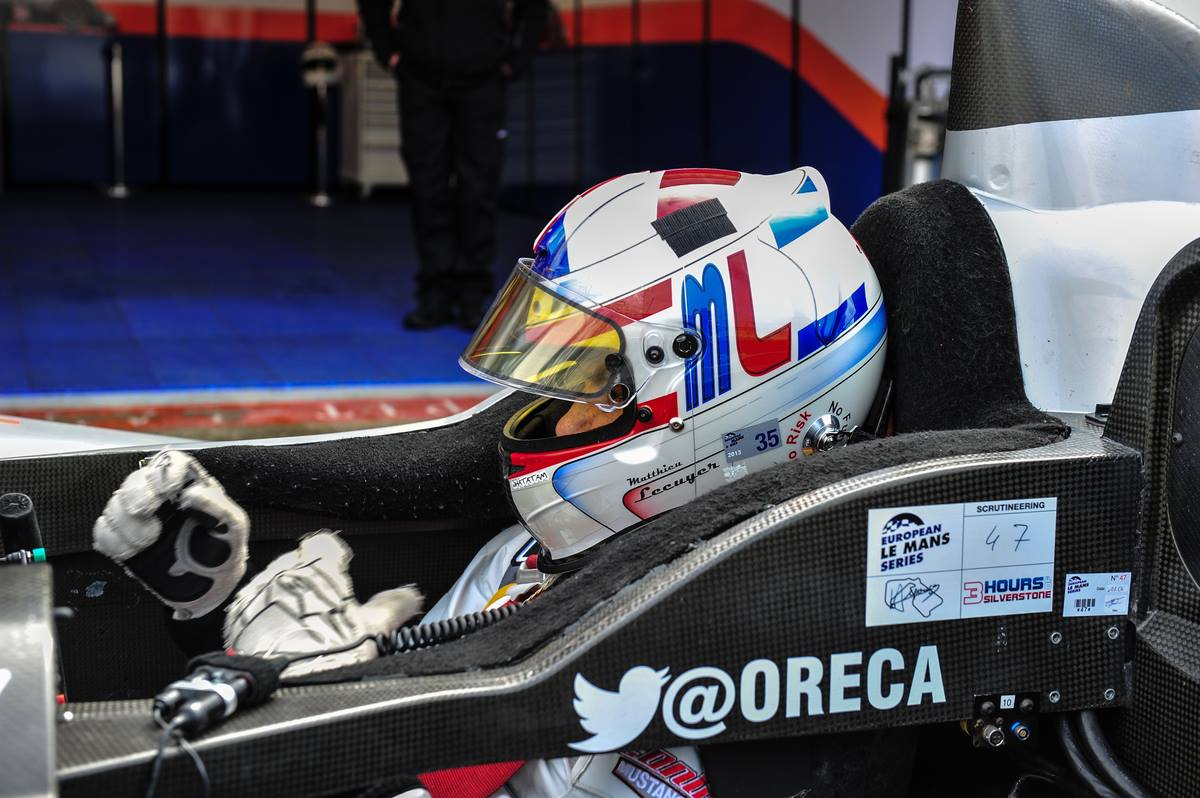
- Matthieu Lecuyer during the European Le Mans Series ORECA season 2013
- Nationality: French
- Born: 19 August 1980 (age 46)

GT Tour; NASA Pro Racing; FARA USA; career
- Current team: Speedcar; Iconic Parts; Backdraft Racing
- Car number: No. 47 (Oreca FLM09)
- Wins: 4
- Poles: 5

Previous series
- 2007-2008 Legends car cup 2009 Peugeot THP Spider Cup; 2009 SCCA GT1 USA; 2009-2010 Bioracing Series; 2011-2013 VDEV Endurance Series; 2011 Radical European Masters; 2012 Trophée Endurance

Matthieu Lecuyer (born 19 August 1980) is a French-American professional sports car racer from Bordeaux, France. He has raced as a member of Team Oreca, Peugeot Sport, CD Sport Performance Engineering, Team Speedcars, Team Iconic Parts, and Backdraft Racing. He has driven Peugeot spider THP, Nissan BRS 4.0 BIORACING, Radical SR8LM, Audi R8 LMS ULTRA GT3, Ferrari 458 GT3, Lamborghini LP 570 ST and Huracan GT3, BMW Z4 GTC, Porsche RSR, LMP2 and LMP3 prototype, ORECA FLM, Ginetta G55, Mustang GT3, WV Sirocco TCR, BMW MGT3, BDR GT3. He was part of the World Endurance Championship WEC with the famous and multiple winner team Oreca in the 24 hours of Le Mans. He has led multiple successful business ventures, including One of a Kind Investment Group (Founder), Mobile Art Auction, One of a Kind Medical Distribution, IKKS Paris Rodeo Drive, and the classic car restoration facility Driving Legend. Since 2025, he has also served as Porsche Cars North America Ambassador and Classic Specialist.

== Career ==
Lecuyer began his motor sports career by racing go kart in his early ages. First auto racing season was in the Legends Car Cup France from 2007-2008. His 2008 season included 2 pole positions and 3 victories. In 2009, Lecuyer participated in the Peugeot THP Spider Cup. He also participated in SCCA GT1 USA that year. Lecuyer raced in the Bioracing Series during the 2010 season and finished in third place in the championship.

Lecuyer participated in both the VDEV Endurance Series and Radical European Masters in 2011 driving Norma and Radical Prototype. Lecuyer also competed in the 2012 and 2013 seasons of the Michelin European VDEV Endurance Series still with Norma Prototype. He competed in the 2013 European Le Mans Series as a member of team ORECA. He drove the Oreca 09 and finished third at both Silverstone and Imola. He additionally raced in Pirelli World Challenge and NASA Pro Racing in 2013 for the Team Iconic in a Mustang GT3. Lecuyer competed in the 24 Hours of Le Mans in June 2013. He raced for BMW MOTORSPORT and Team DKR Engineering during the final race of the European Le Mans series with a Z4 GT3 and finished 5TH in GTC category.

Lecuyer has been the official driver of the American manufacturer Backdraft Racing since 2012 and under contract until 2019. In 2014, Lecuyer participated in the French Gt Championship with the Team Speecars and an AUDI R8 ULTRA LMS. Lecuyer also compete in NASA Pro Racing, and FARA Racing USA. He competed in FARA at Homestead-Miami Speedway in February 2014, but hit by a Corvette GT1 and knocked out of the race. A month later, Lecuyer finished in second place at the Continental Finance Challenge. He also recorded the fastest lap during the challenge head of former Formula One driver Olivier Panis and Franck Lagorce

In April 2014, Lecuyer finished in third place during his first race in the French GT Tour in Le Mans for Team Speed Car. He raced in an Audi R8 LMS Ultra. In October 2014, he raced a one shot for the English Manufacture Ginetta during the race of champions in Miami and finished fourth overall after being the leader for two hours. A brake failure stopped him for a long time in the pits.

For the 2015 season, Lecuyer was recruited by Ginetta USA to compete in the FARA USA championship . In this PRO-AM championship he will be team mate with the Bresilian gentleman driver Kreis Rulino. After four races and three podiums in the Spring challenge, Sunset 300 and Sebring 500 Lecuyer quit Ginetta at the end of season to sign with LAMBORGHINI MIAMI by Avid Motorsports in the NORTH AMERICA SUPER TROFEO. In his first race in Texas at the circuit of the Americas, he finished second for his first PRO CUP race with the Italian manufacture. One month later he would finish seventh in Road Atlanta during the PETIT le Mans race. In November 2015, he won the second race of the WORLD FINAL in Sebring, he also scored the best lap time during the race. In 2016, he extended his contract as a Lamborghini Miami driver with the LAMBORGHINI LP 570 ST-4 in its last years and the new LAMBORGHINI HURACAN ST 620-2

== Notable results ==
Notable results for 2013–2014:

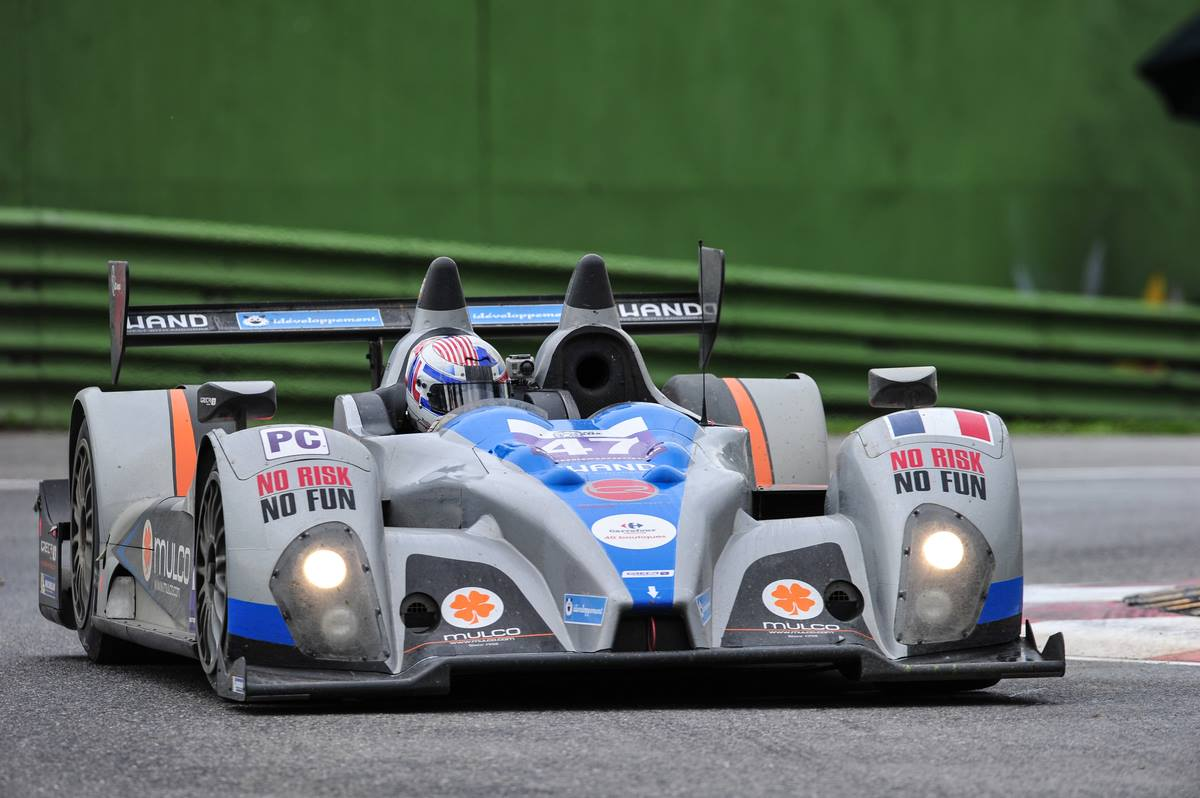
European Le Mans Series ORECA season 2013

| Series | Track | Result | Team | Car |
|---|---|---|---|---|
| Michelin European Endurance Series (2013) | Barcelona | 6th | CD Sport | Norma M20 FC |
| 2013 European Le Mans Series | Silverstone | 3rd | Oreca | Oreca LMP 09 |
| 2013 European Le Mans Series | Imola | 3rd | Oreca | Oreca LMP 09 |
| 2013 European Le Mans Series | Castellet | 5th | DKR Engineering | BMW Z4 GTC |
| GT Tour (2014) | Le Mans | 3rd | Speed Car | Audi R8 LMS Ultra GT3 |

| Serie | Track | Result | Team | Car |
|---|---|---|---|---|
| FARA USA (2014) | Miami Homestead Speedway | 4th | Ginetta USA | Ginetta G55 GT3 |
| FARA USA (2015) | Spring Challenge | 3rd | Ginetta USA | Ginetta G55 GT3 |
| FARA USA (2015) | SUNSET 300 | 3rd | Ginetta USA | Ginetta G55 GT3 |
| FARA USA (2015) | SEBRING 500 | 3rd (fastest lap) | Ginetta USA | Ginetta G55 GT3 |
| Lamborghini Super Trofeo North America | Circuit of the America's (Texas) | 2nd (PRO CUP) | Lamborghini Miami | LP 570 ST |
| Lamborghini Super Trofeo North America | Road Atlanta (Petit Le Mans) | 7th (PRO CUP) | Lamborghini Miami | LP 570 ST |
| Lamborghini Super Trofeo North America | Sebring | 1st and fastest lap (PRO CUP) | Lamborghini Miami | LP 570 ST |

== Personal life ==
Lecuyer is a former airline pilot and lives in Las Vegas, Nevada, USA. He is also known for his personal classic car collection.
