= Silverstone Britcar 24-Hour =

Sports car race in endurance racing

(United Kingdom) Silverstone 24 Hour

24H Series
- Venue: Silverstone Circuit
- First race: 2005
- Duration: 24 hours
- Most wins (driver): Jamie Campbell-Walter, Dieter Quester, Dirk Werner, Mark Poole, Martin Short, Richard Abra (2)
- Most wins (team): Duller Motorsport, Rollcentre Racing (2)
- Most wins (manufacturer): BMW (4)

The Silverstone 24 Hour was a sports car race in endurance racing, held annually at Silverstone Circuit in the United Kingdom until 2018.

The race was originally organised by Britcar. The 2009 race was shortened to 500 miles due to the recession. In 2011 the race used the new arena section for the first time. In 2010 the race continued to use the bridge section, that the race had used in previous years, despite other racing series already switching to the new layout. The 2013 edition was shortened to 1000 km. For 2015 the race was called the Dunlop 24hr at Silverstone for sponsorship reasons.

On October 2, 2015 Creventic, the promoter and organiser of the 24H Series and the Touring Car Endurance Series, announced they would organise the Silverstone 24-Hour race in 2016. It was the third round of the 2016 24H Series season and the first round of the 2016 Touring Car Endurance Series season. Every round of the 24H Series can be entered with a GT car, but this race is only open to non-GT cars.

== Winners ==
Year	Drivers	Team	Car	Laps / Distance
2005	(United Kingdom) Martin Short (United Kingdom) Shaun Balfe (United Kingdom) Jamie Derbyshire (United Kingdom) Nick Jacobs	(United Kingdom) Balfe Motorsport/Rollcentre Racing	Mosler MT900R	603 / 3,100.023 km (1,926.265 mi)
2006	(Austria) Dieter Quester (Germany) Dirk Werner (United Kingdom) Tim Mullen (United Kingdom) Jamie Campbell-Walter	(Austria) Duller Motorsport	BMW Z4 (E85)	595 / 3,058.895 km (1,900.709 mi)
2007	(Austria) Dieter Quester (Germany) Dirk Werner (Germany) Johannes Stuck (United Kingdom) Jamie Campbell-Walter	(Austria) Duller Motorsport	BMW Z4 (E85)	596 / 3,064.036 km (1,903.904 mi)
2008	(United Kingdom) Mark Sumpter (United Kingdom) Adrian Slater (United Kingdom) Andy Purdie	(United Kingdom) Paragon Porsche	Porsche 997 GT3-RSR	603 / 3,100.023 km (1,926.265 mi)
2009	(United Kingdom) Andrew Beaumont (United Kingdom) Pat Gormley (United Kingdom) Ben Clucas	(United Kingdom) Topcats Racing	Mosler MT900R	156 / 801.996 km (498.337 mi) (Note: 500 mile distance)
2010	(Poland) Witt Gamski (United Kingdom) Keith Robinson (United Kingdom) John Gaw (United Kingdom) Phil Dryburgh	(United Kingdom) MJC Ltd	Ferrari F430 GTC	565 / 3,334.065 km (2,071.692 mi)
2011	(United Kingdom) Michael McInerney (United Kingdom) Sean McInerney (United Kingdom) Phil Keen	(United Kingdom) Eclipse Motorsport	Ferrari F430 GTC	573 / 3,375.543 km (2,097.465 mi)
2012	(United Kingdom) Michael Symons (United Kingdom) Clint Bardwell (United Kingdom) Richard Abra (United Kingdom) Mark Poole	(United Kingdom) MP Motorsport/JCAM	BMW M3 E46 GTR	564 / 3,322.524 km (2,064.521 mi)
2013	(United Kingdom) Richard Abra (United Kingdom) Mark Poole	(United Kingdom) Barwell Motorsport	Aston Martin Vantage GT3	158 / 930.778 km (578.359 mi) (Note: 1000 km distance)
2015	(United Kingdom) Andrew Howard (United Kingdom) Jonathan Adam (United Kingdom) Jamie Chadwick (United Kingdom) Ross Gunn (United Kingdom) Harry Whale	(United Kingdom) Beechdean AMR	Aston Martin Vantage GT4	529 / 3,116.256 km (1,936.352 mi)
2016	(United Kingdom) Charles Lamb (United Kingdom) Richard Neary (United Kingdom) "Richard Roberts" (United Kingdom) Martin Short	(United Kingdom) Team ABBA with Rollcentre Racing	BMW M3 E46 GTR	512 / 3,016.192 km (1,874.175 mi)
2017	(Netherlands) Sebastiaan Bleekemolen (Netherlands) Melvin de Groot (Netherlands) Rene Steenmetz (United Kingdom) Robert Smith	(Netherlands) Team Bleekemolen	SEAT León TCR V2 SEQ	549 / 3,233.61 km (2,009.27 mi)
2018	(Netherlands) Ivo Breukers (Netherlands) Rik Breukers (Latvia) Konstantīns Calko	(Netherlands) Red Camel-Jordans.nl	SEAT LCR TCR V3 DSG	411 / 2,420.79 km (1,504.21 mi)

== Participants ==
Many big name teams have taken part in the race such as Rollcentre Racing, Jet Alliance Motorsport and Duller Motorsport. As of the end of the 2016 race, Duller Motorsport and Rollcentre Racing are the only teams that have won this event more than once.

Factory effort teams have also attempted it such as Ginetta, Mazda and Nissan.

In 2007, Top Gear took part in this race using a diesel BMW 3 series for a Top Gear Challenge. They chose a diesel BMW 3 Series because they needed to dispose of a supply of biodiesel they themselves had grown in a prior challenge, with the three presenters (all with very little, if any, experience with endurance racing) joined by "The Stig" (Ben Collins, who had previously won a 24 Hours of Le Mans). They finished the race, third in class, ahead of one of their rival teams who were also competing with a diesel BMW 3 Series, while also overcoming multiple issues including a collision between Richard Hammond and a car in a faster class.

In 2012, a team of ex-servicemen took part under the Mission Motorsport banner in a Nissan 370Z. They finished in 17th overall, scoring a top ten class result.

In 2015, the Ginetta Nissan LMP3 took its debut 24 hour race start with the factory Team LNT squad. Among the driver roster was six-time Olympic champion Sir Chris Hoy. 2015 also marked the first year for a female scoring outright victory; Jamie Chadwick aboard the #35 Beechdean Aston Martin.

Since 2016, the race is restricted to touring cars and 24H-Specials.

== See also ==
- Willhire 24 Hour
- 24H Series
- Touring Car Endurance Series
