= BMW 2 Series (F22) =

Series of subcompact executive cars manufactured by German automobile manufacturer BMW

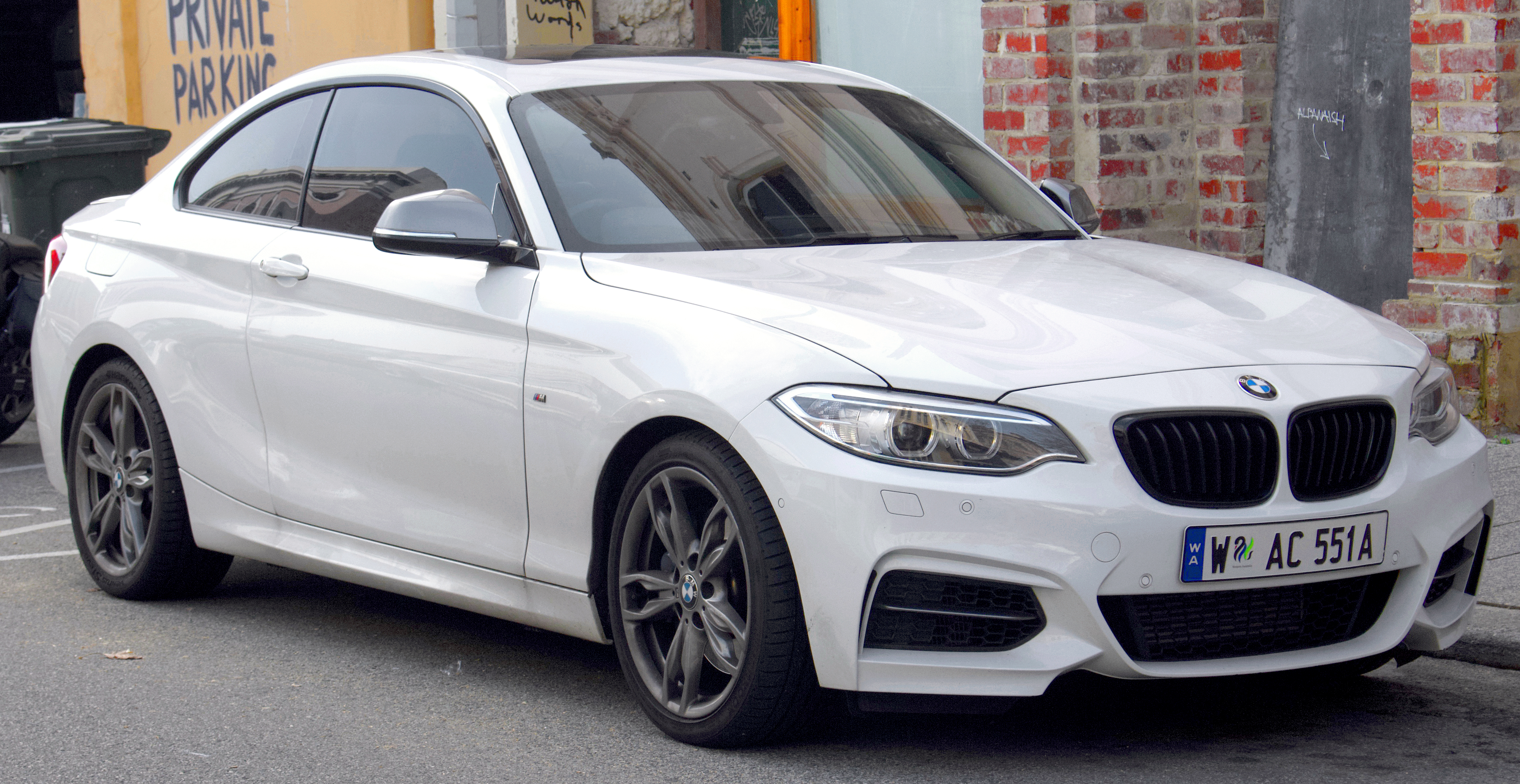

Overview
- Manufacturer: BMW
- Model code: F22 (Coupé); F23 (Convertible)
- Production: 2013-2021 (F22); 2014-2021 (F23).
- Assembly: Germany: Leipzig (BMW Leipzig Plant)
- Designer: Christopher Weil

Body and chassis
- Class: Subcompact executive car (C)
- Body style: 2-door coupé; 2-door convertible
- Layout: Front-engine, rear-wheel-drive; Front-engine, four-wheel-drive (xDrive)
- Related: BMW M2 (F87); BMW 1 Series (F20)

Powertrain
- Engine: Petrol: 1.5 L B38 I3 turbo; 2.0 L N20/B48 I4 turbo; 3.0 L N55/B58/S55 I6 turbo; Diesel: 2.0 L N47/B47 I4 turbo
- Transmission: 6-speed manual; 8-speed automatic; 7-speed dual-clutch

Dimensions
- Wheelbase: 2,690 mm (105.9 in)
- Length: 4,432 mm (174.5 in)
- Width: 1,774 mm (69.8 in)
- Height: 1,418 mm (55.8 in)
- Kerb weight: 1,340–1,685 kg (2,954–3,715 lb)

Chronology
- Predecessor: BMW 1 Series (E82/E88)
- Successor: BMW 2 Series (G42)

The first generation of the coupé and convertible range of the BMW 2 Series subcompact executive car consists of the BMW 2 Series (F22) for the coupé version and BMW 2 Series (F23) for the convertible version. The F22 was in production from November 2013 through 2021, F23 2014 through 2021, and is often collectively referred to as the F22.

The F22 was released as the successor to the E82 1 Series coupé and E88 1 Series convertible. It was produced in Leipzig, alongside the F20 1 Series hatchback.

The high-performance F87 M2 model was produced in the coupe body style. It is powered by the BMW N55 and BMW S55 turbocharged inline-six engines.

The United States was the most popular market for the 2 Series, accounting for one-third of all sales, followed by Germany and Great Britain.

== Development and launch ==
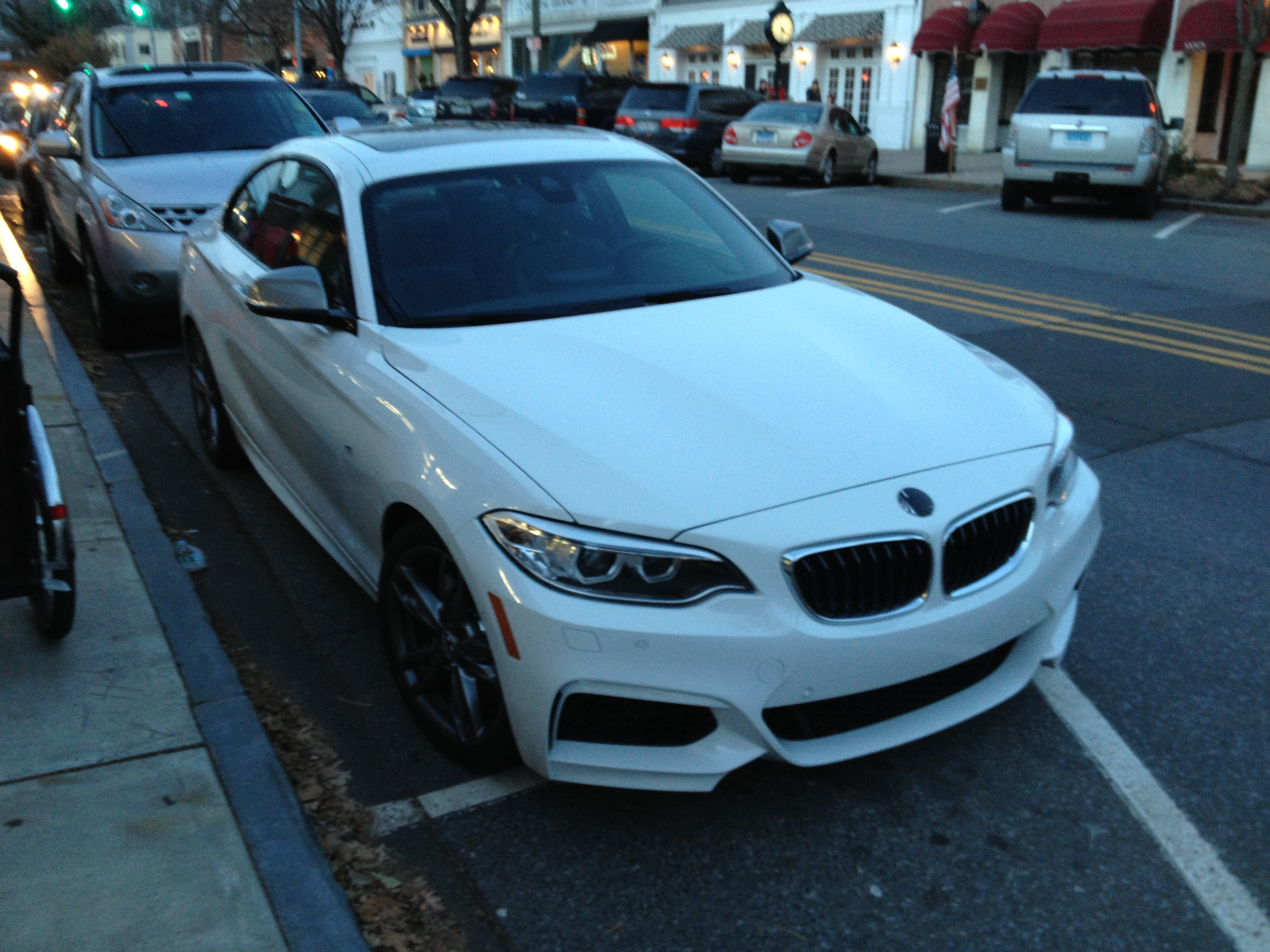
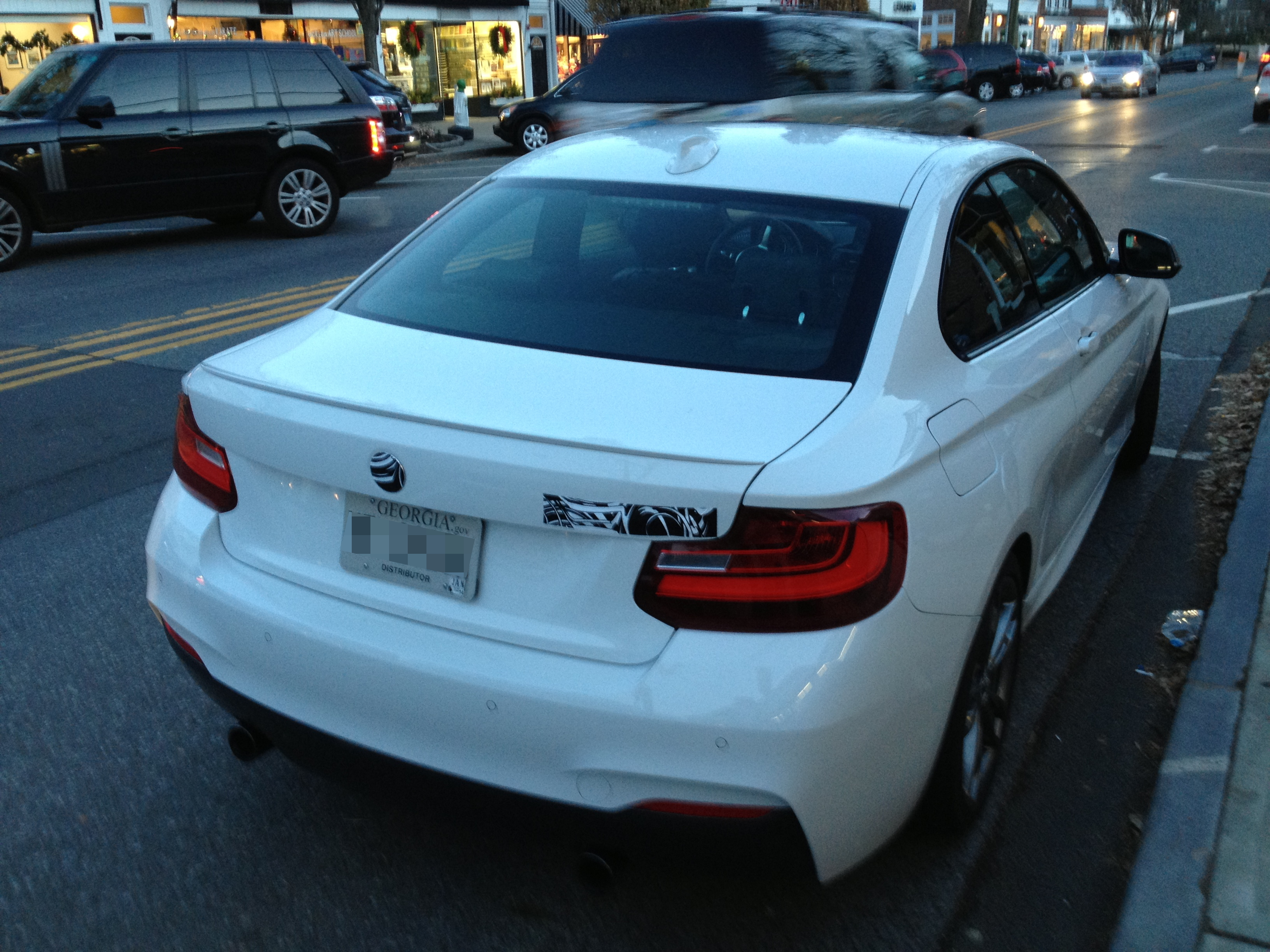
An F22 development mule

The coupé model premiered at the 2014 North American International Auto Show, with sales beginning in March 2014. The convertible model premiered later in October at the 2014 Paris Motor Show, and launched in February 2015. The exterior design was led by Christopher Weil.

The F22 2 Series has a 50:50 weight distribution and uses the F20 platform, with MacPherson strut front suspension and a five-link rear suspension. Compared to the E82 1 Series coupé, the F22 2 Series is 72 mm (2.8 in) longer, 26 mm (1.0 in) wider, and 5 mm (0.2 in) lower. The 2 Series also has 6 mm (0.2 in) more front headroom and 21 mm (0.8 in) more rear legroom, and has an additional 20 litres (0.71 cu ft) trunk space at 390 litres (14 cu ft). The 2 Series has a reduced drag coefficient of 0.29 Cd for the 220i Coupé.

Convertible models feature a 20% increase in rigidity compared to the E88 1 Series convertible and feature an electric convertible top that can be raised or lowered in 20 seconds at speeds up to 50 km/h (31 mph).

All models meet the Euro 6 exhaust emissions standard.

== Body styles ==
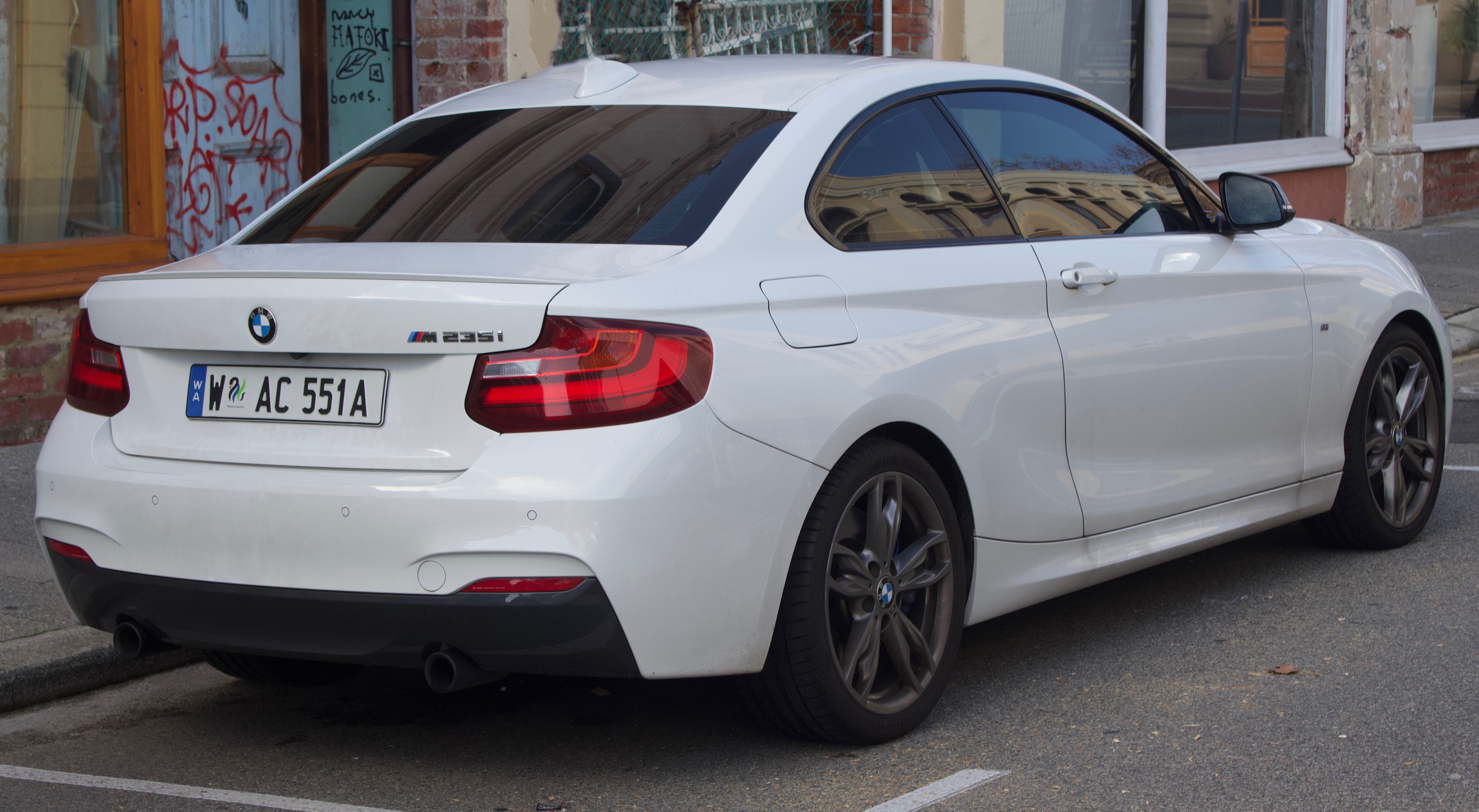
Coupé (F22)

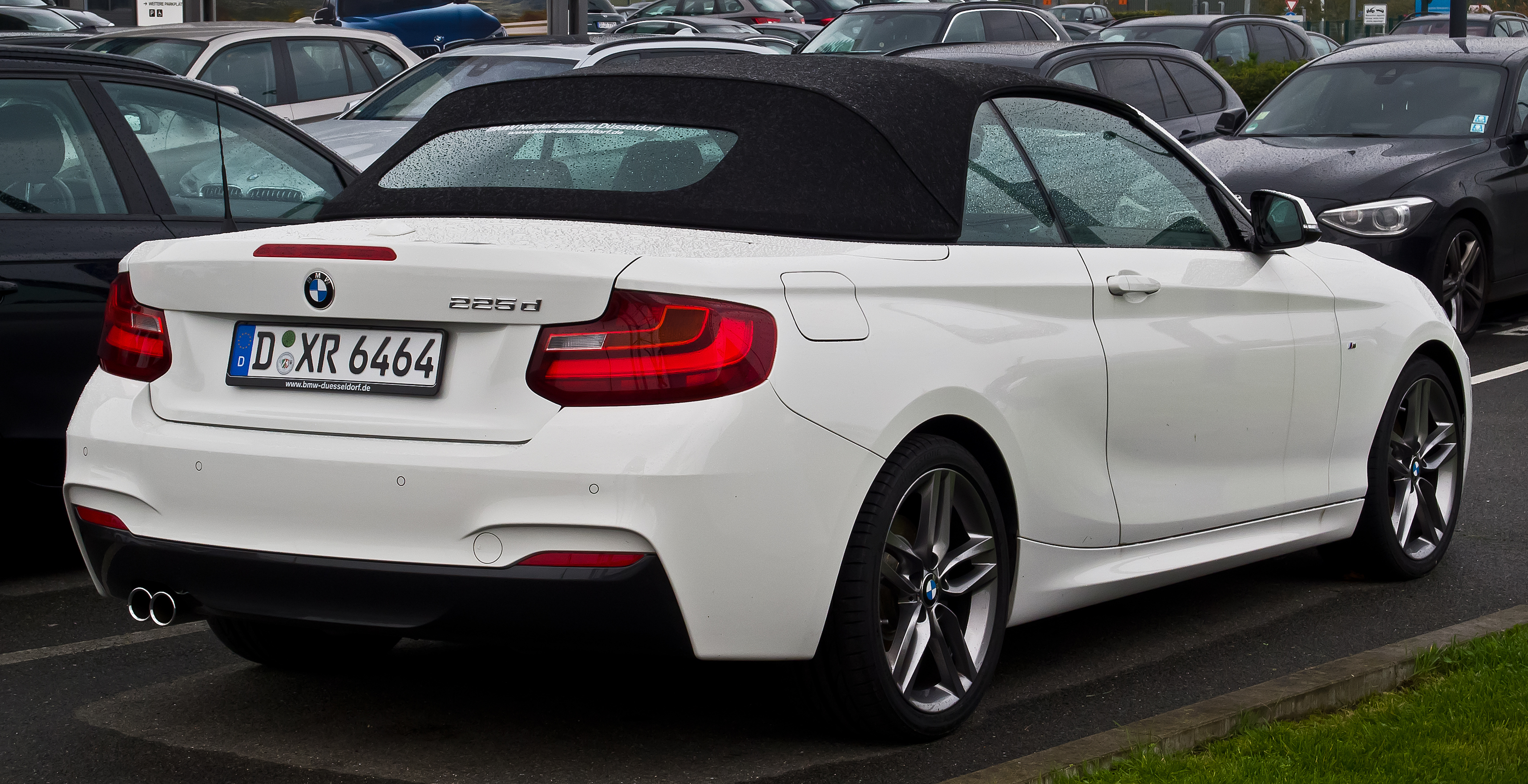
Convertible (F23)

== Equipment ==
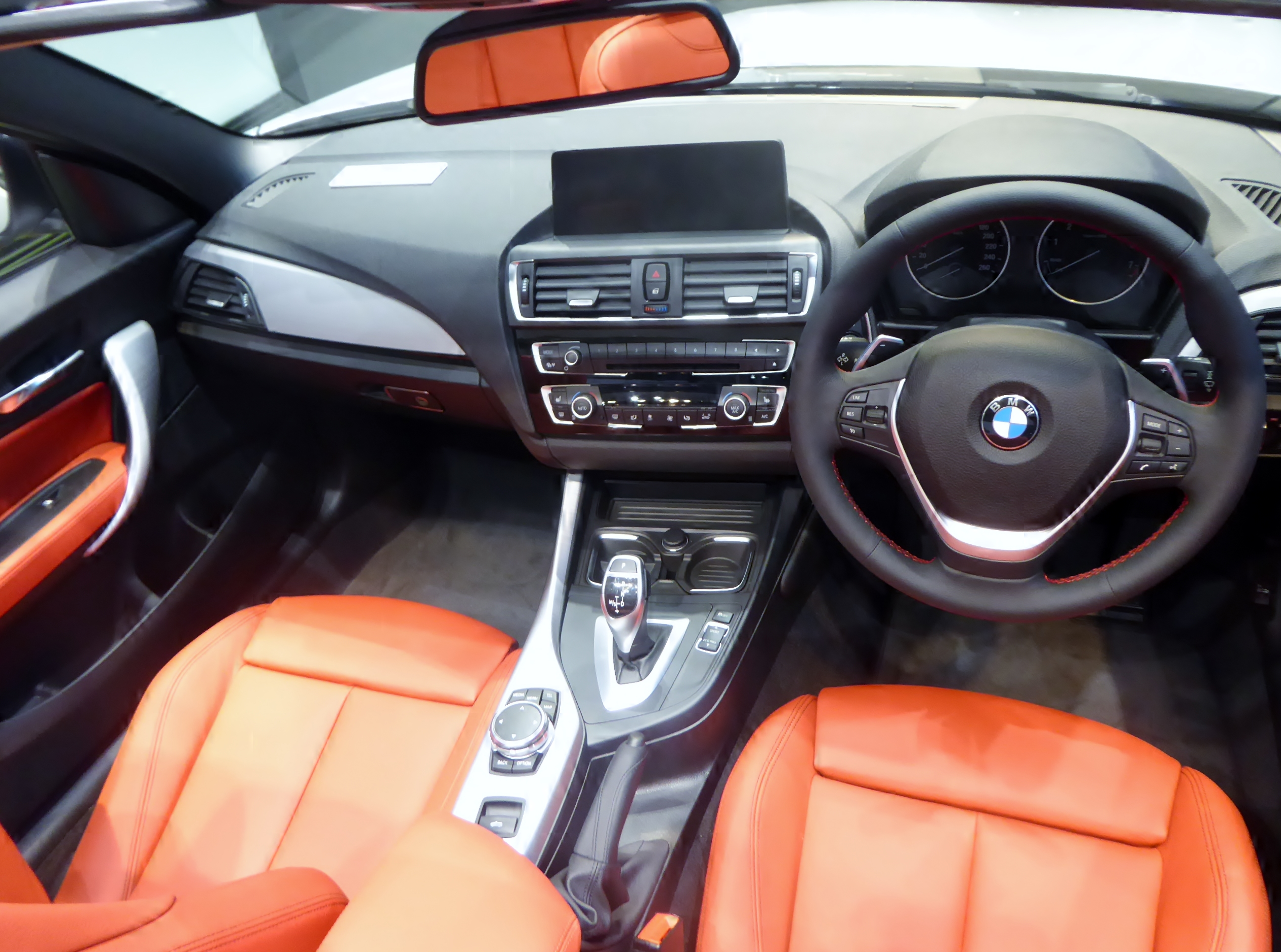
Interior

Standard equipment includes automatic climate control, iDrive with a 6.5-inch display, and 60:40 split folding rear seats. The 2 Series is available in Sport Line, Modern Line, and M Sport trim. Sport line models feature gloss black exterior trim, while Modern line models feature aluminium exterior trim. M Sport models feature a 10 mm (0.4 in) lower suspension, sport seats, and M exterior styling.

218-230 with the M Sport trim and M235-240 models can be fitted with M Performance Parts. These include a splitter, side skirts, lip spoiler and diffuser.

Optional equipment includes automatic parking, traffic sign recognition, a Harman Kardon HiFi system, and Apple CarPlay. Models are also available with iDrive Professional Navigation which features a larger 8.8-inch display with a built-in SIM card with LTE support, allowing for automatic over-the-air updates for live traffic information and on-street parking information.

== Engines ==
=== Petrol engines ===
Model	Years	Engine	Power	Torque	0–100 km/h (0-62 mph)
218i	2015– 2020	B38A15M0; 1.5 L I3 turbo	100 kW (134 hp) at 4,500–6,000 rpm	220 N⋅m (162 lb⋅ft) at 1,250 rpm	8.9 s
218i	2020-2021	B48B20; 2.0 L I4 turbo	100 kW (134 hp) at 4,500–6,000 rpm	220 N⋅m (162 lb⋅ft) at 1,250 rpm	8.9 s
220i	2014–2016	N20B20; 2.0 L I4 turbo	135 kW (181 hp) at 5,000–6,250 rpm	270 N⋅m (199 lb⋅ft) at 1,250–4,500 rpm	7.0 s
220i	2016–2021	B48B20; 2.0 L I4 turbo	135 kW (181 hp) at 5,000–6,250 rpm	290 N⋅m (214 lb⋅ft) at 1,250–4,500 rpm	7.2 s
228i	2014–2016	N20B20; 2.0 L I4 turbo	180 kW (241 hp) at 5,000–6,500 rpm	350 N⋅m (258 lb⋅ft) at 1,250–4,800 rpm	5.7 s
230i	2016–2021	B48B20; 2.0 L I4 turbo	185 kW (248 hp) at 5,200 rpm	350 N⋅m (258 lb⋅ft) at 1,450–4,800 rpm	5.6 s
M235i/M235i xDrive	2014–2016	N55B30O0; 3.0 L I6 turbo	240 kW (322 hp) at 5,800–6,000 rpm	450 N⋅m (332 lb⋅ft) at 1,300–4,500 rpm	4.7/4.5 s
M240i/M240i xDrive	2016–2021	B58B30O0; 3.0 L I6 turbo	250 kW (335 hp) at 5,500 rpm	500 N⋅m (369 lb⋅ft) at 1,520–4,500 rpm	4.6/4.4 s
M2	2016–2018	N55B30T0; 3.0 L I6 turbo	272 kW (365 hp) at 6,500 rpm	465 N⋅m (343 lb⋅ft) at 1,450–4,750 rpm	4.3 s
M2 Competition	2018–2021	S55; 3.0 L I6 twin turbo	302 kW (405 hp) at 5,370–7,200 rpm	550 N⋅m (406 lb⋅ft) at 2,350–5,230 rpm	4.2 s
M2 CS	2020	S55; 3.0 L I6 twin turbo	331 kW (444 hp) at 6250 rpm	550 N⋅m (406 lb⋅ft) at 2,350–5,500 rpm	4.0 s

=== Diesel engines ===
Model	Years	Engine	Power	Torque	0–100 km/h (0-62 mph)
218d	2014–2015	N47D20O1; 2.0 L I4 turbo	105 kW (141 hp) at 4,000 rpm	320 N⋅m (236 lb⋅ft) at 1,750–2,500 rpm	8.6 s
218d	2015–2021	B47D20; 2.0 L I4 turbo	110 kW (148 hp) at 4,000 rpm	320 N⋅m (236 lb⋅ft) at 1,500–3,000 rpm	8.2 s
220d	2014–2015	N47D20O1; 2.0 L I4 turbo	135 kW (181 hp) at 4,000 rpm	380 N⋅m (280 lb⋅ft) at 1,750–2,750 rpm	7.1 s
220d	2015–2021	B47D20; 2.0 L I4 turbo	140 kW (188 hp) at 4,000 rpm	400 N⋅m (295 lb⋅ft) at 1,750–2,500 rpm	7.1 s
225d	2014–2015	N47D20T1; 2.0 L I4 twin turbo	160 kW (215 hp) at 4,400 rpm	450 N⋅m (332 lb⋅ft) at 1,500–2,500 rpm	6.3 s
225d	2015–2019	B47D20; 2.0 L I4 twin turbo	165 kW (221 hp) at 4,400 rpm	450 N⋅m (332 lb⋅ft) at 1,500–3,000 rpm	6.2 s

== BMW M2 ==
=== M2 (F87) ===
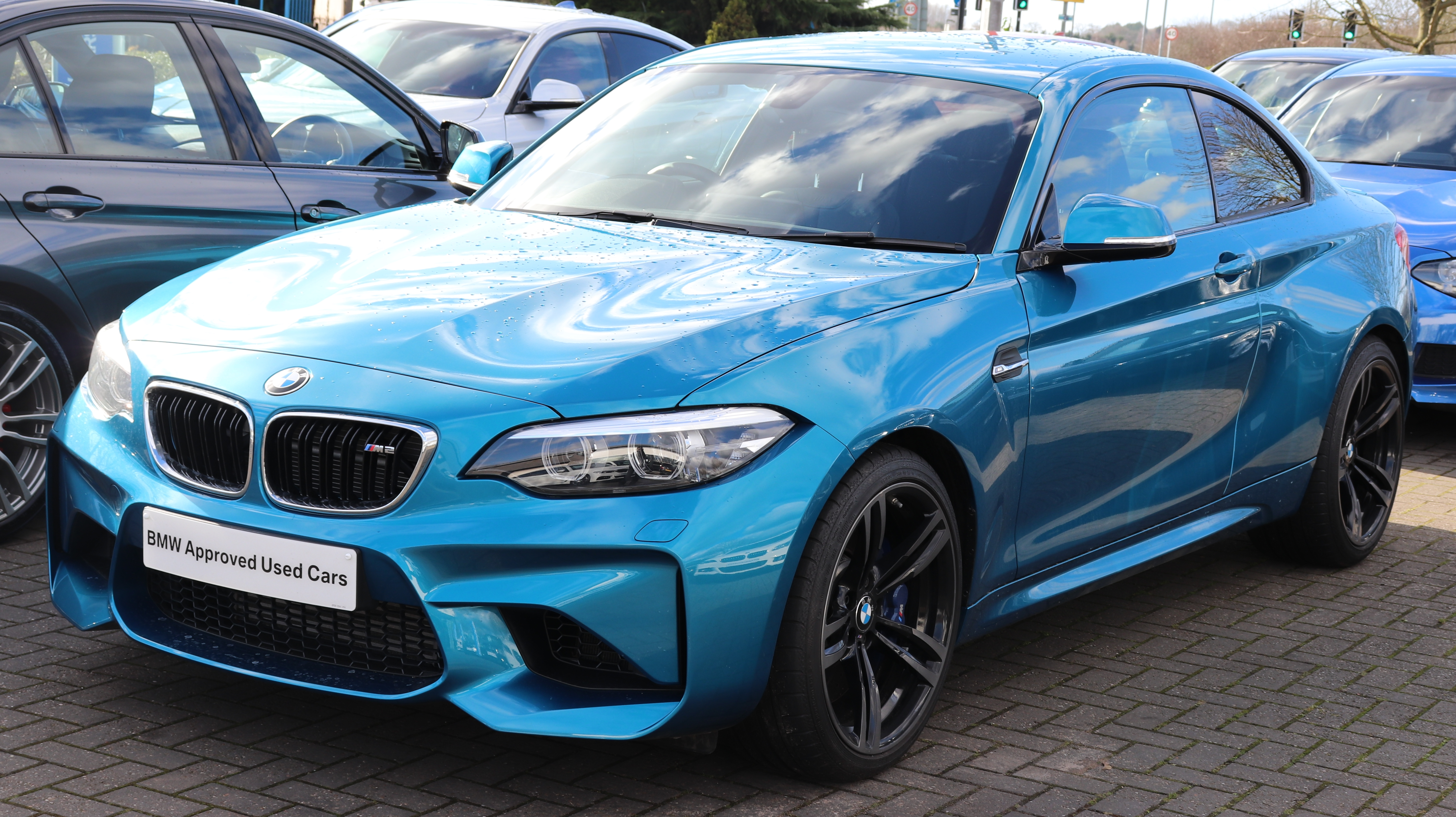
BMW M2 (F87)

In November 2015, BMW unveiled their high-performance version of the 2 Series, the M2, with sales beginning in 2016 and only being available as a 2-door coupe. The Competition replaced the standard car in 2018 with the CS being revealed in November 2019 and sales beginning in March 2020, with 2,200 units planned.

== Special variants ==
=== M235i Track Edition ===
For 2015 BMW sold the M235i Track Edition as a limited production model in certain markets. In Canada, it was limited to 50 units. It came with the same N55B30 engine as the standard M235i, but was equipped with a limited-slip differential, M Performance suspension, and M Performance exhaust, while power seat motors and the sunroof were eliminated to save weight. Other changes included special wheels, carbon mirror caps, a trunk lip spoiler, and a full M Performance aerodynamics package.

== Model year changes ==
2015

- 218i model introduced, powered by the 3-cylinder B38 engine.
- Diesel engines changed from 4-cylinder N47 to 4-cylinder BMW B47 (218d, 220d and 225d models).

2016

The following changes were available from summer 2016:

- Engine in 4-cylinder models upgraded to B48B20 2.0 L I4 turbo
- Engine in 6-cylinder models upgraded to B58B30O0 3.0 L I6 turbo
- iDrive 5.0 system introduced
- Wireless charging option available

=== 2017 facelift ===
The following changes apply to facelift models, which were launched in July 2017:

- Exterior designed changes including: updated front fascia, hexagonal LED headlights (Adaptive LED pack / option), updated LED taillights, and new alloy designs and exterior paint options
- Interior design changes including: a redesigned dashboard and additional leather and cloth options

=== 2019 ===
- All models now feature darkened rear lights from March 2019
- 225d model discontinued.

2020

- 218i model changed from 3-cylinder B38 engine to 4-cylinder B48.

== Production volumes ==
The following are production figures for the 2 Series:

Year	Total
2014	41,038
2015	157,144
2016	196,183
2017	181,113
2018	152,215
2019	115,184
2020	104,859

BMW does not break down sales between 2 series variants such as the F22, F23, F87, F45, and F46. The F45 and F46 make up the majority of 2 series sales globally.

== Awards ==
- 2014 Red Dot Good Design Award
- 2014 and 2015 Sport Auto "Best coupé up to €50,000"
- 2015 Auto Zeitung Design Award (compact class convertibles)
- 2015 and 2019 Car and Driver's 10Best
- 2016 Auto Bild Sportscars "Sports Car of the Year"
- 2016 Auto motor und sport "Autonis Best New Design" in the compact class
- 2016 and 2017 Car of the Year Japan "Emotional Car of the Year"
