= 2019 24H TCE Series =

Endurance touring car racing series

The 2019 24H Touring Car Endurance Series powered by Hankook was the fourth season of the Touring Car Endurance Series (TCES). Creventic was the organiser and promoter of the series. The races were contested with touring cars.

== Calendar ==
Round	Event	Circuit	Date	Report
1	24H Dubai	Dubai Autodrome, Dubai, United Arab Emirates	11–13 January	Report
2	12H Mugello	Mugello Circuit, Mugello, Italy	29–30 March	Report
3	12H Spa	Circuit de Spa-Francorchamps, Spa, Belgium	19–20 April	Report
4	12H Brno	Brno Circuit, Brno, Czech Republic	24–26 May	Report
5	24H Portimão	Algarve International Circuit, Portimão, Portugal	6–8 July	Report
6	24H Barcelona	Circuit de Barcelona-Catalunya, Montmeló, Spain	30 August–1 September	Report
7	24H COTA	Circuit of the Americas, Austin, United States	16–18 November	Report

Race is part of the Championship of the Continents
Race is part of the European Championship
Race is part of both the Championship of the Continents and the European Championship

== Entry list ==
TCR
Team	Car	No.	Drivers	Rounds
(Hong Kong) Teamwork Motorsport	Audi RS 3 LMS TCR	100	(Hong Kong) Alexander Fung	1
(Hong Kong) Teamwork Motorsport	Audi RS 3 LMS TCR	100	(Hong Kong) Alex Hui	1
(Hong Kong) Teamwork Motorsport	Audi RS 3 LMS TCR	100	(Hong Kong) Paul Poon	1
(Hong Kong) Teamwork Motorsport	Audi RS 3 LMS TCR	100	(Hong Kong) Sunny Wong	1
(Netherlands) Red Camel-Jordans.nl	CUPRA León TCR	101	(Netherlands) Ivo Breukers	1–4, 6-7
(Netherlands) Red Camel-Jordans.nl	CUPRA León TCR	101	(Germany) Henry Littig	1–2, 5
(Netherlands) Red Camel-Jordans.nl	CUPRA León TCR	101	(Australia) Cody Hill	1–2
(Netherlands) Red Camel-Jordans.nl	CUPRA León TCR	101	(Austria) Klaus Kresnik	1, 5
(Netherlands) Red Camel-Jordans.nl	CUPRA León TCR	101	(Netherlands) Rik Breukers	3–4
(Netherlands) Red Camel-Jordans.nl	CUPRA León TCR	101	(Netherlands) Francis Tjia	3
(Netherlands) Red Camel-Jordans.nl	CUPRA León TCR	101	(Netherlands) Luc Breukers	4–6
(Netherlands) Red Camel-Jordans.nl	CUPRA León TCR	101	(Portugal) Nuno Corvo	5
(Netherlands) Red Camel-Jordans.nl	CUPRA León TCR	101	(Netherlands) Gijs Bessem	6
(Netherlands) Red Camel-Jordans.nl	CUPRA León TCR	101	(Netherlands) Harry Hilders	6
(Netherlands) Red Camel-Jordans.nl	CUPRA León TCR	101	(United Kingdom) Steven Liquorish	7
(Netherlands) Red Camel-Jordans.nl	CUPRA León TCR	101	(Canada) Jerimy Daniel	7
(Netherlands) Red Camel-Jordans.nl	CUPRA León TCR	101	(Canada) Jean-Francois Hevey	7
(Denmark) Holmgaard Motorsport	Volkswagen Golf GTI TCR	102	(Norway) Roy Edland	2–3, 6
(Denmark) Holmgaard Motorsport	Volkswagen Golf GTI TCR	102	(Denmark) Jonas Holmgaard	2–3, 6
(Denmark) Holmgaard Motorsport	Volkswagen Golf GTI TCR	102	(Denmark) Magnus Holmgaard	2–3, 6
(Denmark) Holmgaard Motorsport	Volkswagen Golf GTI TCR	102	(Denmark) Benny Simonsen	2
(Denmark) Holmgaard Motorsport	Volkswagen Golf GTI TCR	102	(Denmark) Martin Gøtsche	3
(Denmark) Holmgaard Motorsport	Volkswagen Golf GTI TCR	102	(Denmark) Michael Carlsen	6
(Denmark) Holmgaard Motorsport	Volkswagen Golf GTI TCR	102	(New Zealand) Rowan Shepherd	6
(Switzerland) TTC Racing	SEAT León TCR	103	(Switzerland) Daniel Schilliger	2, 4, 6
(Switzerland) TTC Racing	SEAT León TCR	103	(Switzerland) Adrian Spescha	2, 6
(Switzerland) TTC Racing	SEAT León TCR	103	(Switzerland) Rolf Reding	4, 6
(Switzerland) TTC Racing	SEAT León TCR	103	(Switzerland) Fredy Suter	6
(Switzerland) Capricorn Racing	Honda Civic Type R TCR (FK2)	104	(Switzerland) Patrik Meier	2–3
(Switzerland) Capricorn Racing	Honda Civic Type R TCR (FK2)	104	(Switzerland) Claudio Truffer	2–3
(Lithuania) GSR Motorsport	Volkswagen Golf GTI TCR 1 Audi RS 3 LMS TCR 1	105	(Lithuania) Ernesta Globytė	3, 6
(Lithuania) GSR Motorsport	Volkswagen Golf GTI TCR 1 Audi RS 3 LMS TCR 1	105	(Lithuania) Vytenis Gulbinas	3, 6
(Lithuania) GSR Motorsport	Volkswagen Golf GTI TCR 1 Audi RS 3 LMS TCR 1	105	(Lithuania) Rokas Kvedaras	3, 6
(Lithuania) GSR Motorsport	Volkswagen Golf GTI TCR 1 Audi RS 3 LMS TCR 1	105	(Lithuania) Rolandas Salys	3
(Lithuania) GSR Motorsport	Volkswagen Golf GTI TCR 1 Audi RS 3 LMS TCR 1	105	(Lithuania) Rimvydas Savickas	3
(Lithuania) GSR Motorsport	Volkswagen Golf GTI TCR 1 Audi RS 3 LMS TCR 1	105	(Lithuania) Arūnas Gečiauskas	6
(Lithuania) GSR Motorsport	Volkswagen Golf GTI TCR 1 Audi RS 3 LMS TCR 1	105	(Lithuania) Rokas Steponavicius	6
(Spain) Monlau Competición	CUPRA León TCR	107	(United Kingdom) Tom Black	2, 4, 7
(Spain) Monlau Competición	CUPRA León TCR	107	(United Kingdom) Stuart Hall	2, 4, 7
(Spain) Monlau Competición	CUPRA León TCR	107	(United Kingdom) Christopher Kemp	2, 4, 7
(Spain) Monlau Competición	CUPRA León TCR	107	(United Kingdom) David Tinn	2, 4, 7
(Spain) Monlau Competición	CUPRA León TCR	109	(Thailand) Anusorn Asiralertsiri	2
(Spain) Monlau Competición	CUPRA León TCR	109	(Thailand) Kantadhee Kusiri	2
(Spain) Monlau Competición	CUPRA León TCR	109	(Thailand) Chariya Nuya	2
(Spain) Monlau Competición	CUPRA León TCR	109	(Thailand) Munkong Sathienthirakul	2
(Sweden) Lestrup Racing Team	Volkswagen Golf GTI TCR	110	(Sweden) Peter Fahlström	2, 4
(Sweden) Lestrup Racing Team	Volkswagen Golf GTI TCR	110	(Sweden) Stefan Nilsson	2, 4
(Sweden) Lestrup Racing Team	Volkswagen Golf GTI TCR	110	(Sweden) Mats Olsson	2
(Sweden) Lestrup Racing Team	Volkswagen Golf GTI TCR	110	(Sweden) Emil Sällberg	2, 4
(Sweden) Lestrup Racing Team	Volkswagen Golf GTI TCR	110	(Sweden) Marcus Fluch	4
(United Arab Emirates) Atech Racing	SEAT León TCR	111	(United Kingdom) Colin Boyle	1
(United Arab Emirates) Atech Racing	SEAT León TCR	111	(Australia) Peter England	1
(United Arab Emirates) Atech Racing	SEAT León TCR	111	(United Kingdom) Julian Griffin	1
(United Arab Emirates) Atech Racing	SEAT León TCR	111	(United Kingdom) Will Morrison	1
(United Arab Emirates) Atech Racing	SEAT León TCR	111	(United Kingdom) Jonathan Simmonds	1
(Switzerland) Autorama Motorsport by Wolf-Power Racing	Volkswagen Golf GTI TCR	112	(Switzerland) Fabian Danz	1–4
(Switzerland) Autorama Motorsport by Wolf-Power Racing	Volkswagen Golf GTI TCR	112	(Switzerland) Yannick Mettler	1, 5–7
(Switzerland) Autorama Motorsport by Wolf-Power Racing	Volkswagen Golf GTI TCR	112	(Switzerland) Jérôme Ogay	1, 5–7
(Switzerland) Autorama Motorsport by Wolf-Power Racing	Volkswagen Golf GTI TCR	112	(Germany) Marlon Menden	1, 5–6
(Switzerland) Autorama Motorsport by Wolf-Power Racing	Volkswagen Golf GTI TCR	112	(Switzerland) Stefan Tanner	1, 5
(Switzerland) Autorama Motorsport by Wolf-Power Racing	Volkswagen Golf GTI TCR	112	(Denmark) Kristian Jepsen	2–3
(Switzerland) Autorama Motorsport by Wolf-Power Racing	Volkswagen Golf GTI TCR	112	(Denmark) Jan Sørensen	2–3
(Switzerland) Autorama Motorsport by Wolf-Power Racing	Volkswagen Golf GTI TCR	112	(Finland) Antti Buri	4
(Switzerland) Autorama Motorsport by Wolf-Power Racing	Volkswagen Golf GTI TCR	112	(Finland) Kari-Pekka Laaksonen	4
(Switzerland) Autorama Motorsport by Wolf-Power Racing	Volkswagen Golf GTI TCR	112	(Switzerland) Ralf Henggeler	5–6
(Switzerland) Autorama Motorsport by Wolf-Power Racing	Volkswagen Golf GTI TCR	112	(Germany) Benjamin Leuchter	6
(Switzerland) Autorama Motorsport by Wolf-Power Racing	Volkswagen Golf GTI TCR	112	(Italy) Roberto Ferri	7
(Switzerland) Autorama Motorsport by Wolf-Power Racing	Volkswagen Golf GTI TCR	112	(Italy) Alberto Vescovi	7
(Switzerland) Autorama Motorsport by Wolf-Power Racing	Volkswagen Golf GTI TCR	112	(Austria) Constantin Kletzer	7
(Switzerland) Autorama Motorsport by Wolf-Power Racing	Volkswagen Golf GTI TCR	114	(Switzerland) Yannick Mettler	6-7
(Switzerland) Autorama Motorsport by Wolf-Power Racing	Volkswagen Golf GTI TCR	114	(Denmark) Kristian Jepsen	6
(Switzerland) Autorama Motorsport by Wolf-Power Racing	Volkswagen Golf GTI TCR	114	(Denmark) Jan Sorensen	6
(Switzerland) Autorama Motorsport by Wolf-Power Racing	Volkswagen Golf GTI TCR	114	(Switzerland) Lukas Desserich	7
(Switzerland) Autorama Motorsport by Wolf-Power Racing	Volkswagen Golf GTI TCR	114	(Switzerland) Stefan Tanner	7
(Switzerland) Autorama Motorsport by Wolf-Power Racing	Volkswagen Golf GTI TCR	114	(Switzerland) Christoph Ulrich	7
(Switzerland) Autorama Motorsport by Wolf-Power Racing	Volkswagen Golf GTI TCR	114	(Switzerland) Jérôme Ogay	7
(Germany) Bonk Motorsport	Audi RS 3 LMS TCR	115	(Germany) Hermann Bock	2
(Germany) Bonk Motorsport	Audi RS 3 LMS TCR	115	(Germany) Max Partl	2
(Germany) Bonk Motorsport	Audi RS 3 LMS TCR	169	(Austria) Constantin Kletzer	2
(Germany) Bonk Motorsport	Audi RS 3 LMS TCR	169	(Germany) Volker Piepmeyer	2
(Germany) Bonk Motorsport	Audi RS 3 LMS TCR	169	(Germany) Michael Bonk	2
(United Kingdom) J W BIRD Motorsport	Volkswagen Golf GTI TCR	121	(United Kingdom) Paul Dehadray	1
(United Kingdom) J W BIRD Motorsport	Volkswagen Golf GTI TCR	121	(United Kingdom) Kieran Griffin	1
(United Kingdom) J W BIRD Motorsport	Volkswagen Golf GTI TCR	121	(United Kingdom) Liam Griffin	1
(United Kingdom) J W BIRD Motorsport	Volkswagen Golf GTI TCR	121	(United Kingdom) Philip House	1
(Hong Kong) KCMG	Honda Civic Type R TCR (FK8)	122	(Hong Kong) Jim Ka To	1
(Hong Kong) KCMG	Honda Civic Type R TCR (FK8)	122	(Hong Kong) Paul Ip	1
(Hong Kong) KCMG	Honda Civic Type R TCR (FK8)	122	(Hong Kong) Kenneth Ma	1
(Hong Kong) KCMG	Honda Civic Type R TCR (FK8)	122	(Hong Kong) Henry Lee Jr.	1
(Hong Kong) KCMG	Honda Civic Type R TCR (FK8)	122	(Hong Kong) Andy Yan	1
(Spain) TICTAP TOTCAR SPORT	SEAT LCR TCR V3 DSG	123	(Spain) Jorge Belloc Diaz	2, 6
(Spain) TICTAP TOTCAR SPORT	SEAT LCR TCR V3 DSG	123	(Spain) Jorge Belloc Ruiz	2, 6
(Spain) TICTAP TOTCAR SPORT	SEAT LCR TCR V3 DSG	123	(Spain) Isidoro Diaz-Guerra Gonzalez	2, 6
(Spain) TICTAP TOTCAR SPORT	SEAT LCR TCR V3 DSG	123	(Spain) Álvaro Rodríguez Sastre	6
(Netherlands) (Finland) (Switzerland) (Netherlands) / Bas Koeten Racing (Note: Car No. 125 entered as Bas Koeten Racing, car No. 129 entered as LMS Racing by Bas Koeten Racing, car No. 131 entered as TOPCAR sport by Bas Koeten Racing and car No. 175 entered at NKPP Racing by Bas Koeten Racing.); (Netherlands) (Finland) (Switzerland) (Netherlands) / LMS Racing by Bas Koeten Racing; (Netherlands) (Finland) (Switzerland) (Netherlands) / TOPCAR sport by Bas Koeten Racing; (Netherlands) (Finland) (Switzerland) (Netherlands) / NKPP Racing by Bas Koeten Racing	CUPRA León TCR	125	(Switzerland) Julien Apotheloz	1
(Netherlands) (Finland) (Switzerland) (Netherlands) / Bas Koeten Racing; (Netherlands) (Finland) (Switzerland) (Netherlands) / LMS Racing by Bas Koeten Racing; (Netherlands) (Finland) (Switzerland) (Netherlands) / TOPCAR sport by Bas Koeten Racing; (Netherlands) (Finland) (Switzerland) (Netherlands) / NKPP Racing by Bas Koeten Racing	CUPRA León TCR	125	(Netherlands) Oscar Graeper	1
(Netherlands) (Finland) (Switzerland) (Netherlands) / Bas Koeten Racing; (Netherlands) (Finland) (Switzerland) (Netherlands) / LMS Racing by Bas Koeten Racing; (Netherlands) (Finland) (Switzerland) (Netherlands) / TOPCAR sport by Bas Koeten Racing; (Netherlands) (Finland) (Switzerland) (Netherlands) / NKPP Racing by Bas Koeten Racing	CUPRA León TCR	125	(Netherlands) Loek Hartog	1
(Netherlands) (Finland) (Switzerland) (Netherlands) / Bas Koeten Racing; (Netherlands) (Finland) (Switzerland) (Netherlands) / LMS Racing by Bas Koeten Racing; (Netherlands) (Finland) (Switzerland) (Netherlands) / TOPCAR sport by Bas Koeten Racing; (Netherlands) (Finland) (Switzerland) (Netherlands) / NKPP Racing by Bas Koeten Racing	CUPRA León TCR	125	(Switzerland) Ronny Jost	1
(Netherlands) (Finland) (Switzerland) (Netherlands) / Bas Koeten Racing; (Netherlands) (Finland) (Switzerland) (Netherlands) / LMS Racing by Bas Koeten Racing; (Netherlands) (Finland) (Switzerland) (Netherlands) / TOPCAR sport by Bas Koeten Racing; (Netherlands) (Finland) (Switzerland) (Netherlands) / NKPP Racing by Bas Koeten Racing	CUPRA León TCR	131	(Finland) Antti Buri	5–7
(Netherlands) (Finland) (Switzerland) (Netherlands) / Bas Koeten Racing; (Netherlands) (Finland) (Switzerland) (Netherlands) / LMS Racing by Bas Koeten Racing; (Netherlands) (Finland) (Switzerland) (Netherlands) / TOPCAR sport by Bas Koeten Racing; (Netherlands) (Finland) (Switzerland) (Netherlands) / NKPP Racing by Bas Koeten Racing	CUPRA León TCR	131	(Switzerland) Julien Apotheloz	5–6
(Netherlands) (Finland) (Switzerland) (Netherlands) / Bas Koeten Racing; (Netherlands) (Finland) (Switzerland) (Netherlands) / LMS Racing by Bas Koeten Racing; (Netherlands) (Finland) (Switzerland) (Netherlands) / TOPCAR sport by Bas Koeten Racing; (Netherlands) (Finland) (Switzerland) (Netherlands) / NKPP Racing by Bas Koeten Racing	CUPRA León TCR	131	(Switzerland) Ronny Jost	5, 7
(Netherlands) (Finland) (Switzerland) (Netherlands) / Bas Koeten Racing; (Netherlands) (Finland) (Switzerland) (Netherlands) / LMS Racing by Bas Koeten Racing; (Netherlands) (Finland) (Switzerland) (Netherlands) / TOPCAR sport by Bas Koeten Racing; (Netherlands) (Finland) (Switzerland) (Netherlands) / NKPP Racing by Bas Koeten Racing	CUPRA León TCR	131	(Finland) Kari-Pekka Laaksonen	5, 7
(Netherlands) (Finland) (Switzerland) (Netherlands) / Bas Koeten Racing; (Netherlands) (Finland) (Switzerland) (Netherlands) / LMS Racing by Bas Koeten Racing; (Netherlands) (Finland) (Switzerland) (Netherlands) / TOPCAR sport by Bas Koeten Racing; (Netherlands) (Finland) (Switzerland) (Netherlands) / NKPP Racing by Bas Koeten Racing	CUPRA León TCR	131	(Switzerland) Fabian Danz	6-7
(Netherlands) (Finland) (Switzerland) (Netherlands) / Bas Koeten Racing; (Netherlands) (Finland) (Switzerland) (Netherlands) / LMS Racing by Bas Koeten Racing; (Netherlands) (Finland) (Switzerland) (Netherlands) / TOPCAR sport by Bas Koeten Racing; (Netherlands) (Finland) (Switzerland) (Netherlands) / NKPP Racing by Bas Koeten Racing	CUPRA León TCR	131	(Germany) Loris Prattes	6
(Netherlands) (Finland) (Switzerland) (Netherlands) / Bas Koeten Racing; (Netherlands) (Finland) (Switzerland) (Netherlands) / LMS Racing by Bas Koeten Racing; (Netherlands) (Finland) (Switzerland) (Netherlands) / TOPCAR sport by Bas Koeten Racing; (Netherlands) (Finland) (Switzerland) (Netherlands) / NKPP Racing by Bas Koeten Racing	CUPRA León TCR	175	(Netherlands) Gijs Bessem	4
(Netherlands) (Finland) (Switzerland) (Netherlands) / Bas Koeten Racing; (Netherlands) (Finland) (Switzerland) (Netherlands) / LMS Racing by Bas Koeten Racing; (Netherlands) (Finland) (Switzerland) (Netherlands) / TOPCAR sport by Bas Koeten Racing; (Netherlands) (Finland) (Switzerland) (Netherlands) / NKPP Racing by Bas Koeten Racing	CUPRA León TCR	175	(Netherlands) Christiaan Frankenhout	4
(Netherlands) (Finland) (Switzerland) (Netherlands) / Bas Koeten Racing; (Netherlands) (Finland) (Switzerland) (Netherlands) / LMS Racing by Bas Koeten Racing; (Netherlands) (Finland) (Switzerland) (Netherlands) / TOPCAR sport by Bas Koeten Racing; (Netherlands) (Finland) (Switzerland) (Netherlands) / NKPP Racing by Bas Koeten Racing	CUPRA León TCR	175	(Netherlands) Harry Hilders	4
(Netherlands) (Finland) (Switzerland) (Netherlands) / Bas Koeten Racing; (Netherlands) (Finland) (Switzerland) (Netherlands) / LMS Racing by Bas Koeten Racing; (Netherlands) (Finland) (Switzerland) (Netherlands) / TOPCAR sport by Bas Koeten Racing; (Netherlands) (Finland) (Switzerland) (Netherlands) / NKPP Racing by Bas Koeten Racing	Audi RS 3 LMS TCR	129	(Finland) Antti Buri	1
(Netherlands) (Finland) (Switzerland) (Netherlands) / Bas Koeten Racing; (Netherlands) (Finland) (Switzerland) (Netherlands) / LMS Racing by Bas Koeten Racing; (Netherlands) (Finland) (Switzerland) (Netherlands) / TOPCAR sport by Bas Koeten Racing; (Netherlands) (Finland) (Switzerland) (Netherlands) / NKPP Racing by Bas Koeten Racing	Audi RS 3 LMS TCR	129	(Finland) Olli Parhankangas	1
(Netherlands) (Finland) (Switzerland) (Netherlands) / Bas Koeten Racing; (Netherlands) (Finland) (Switzerland) (Netherlands) / LMS Racing by Bas Koeten Racing; (Netherlands) (Finland) (Switzerland) (Netherlands) / TOPCAR sport by Bas Koeten Racing; (Netherlands) (Finland) (Switzerland) (Netherlands) / NKPP Racing by Bas Koeten Racing	Audi RS 3 LMS TCR	129	(Finland) Kari-Pekka Laaksonen	1
(United States) Atlanta Speedwerks	Honda Civic Type R TCR (FK7)	126	(United States) Brian Henderson	7
(United States) Atlanta Speedwerks	Honda Civic Type R TCR (FK7)	126	(United States) Taylor Hagler	7
(United States) Atlanta Speedwerks	Honda Civic Type R TCR (FK7)	126	(United States) Barry Boes	7
(United States) Atlanta Speedwerks	Honda Civic Type R TCR (FK7)	126	(United States) Todd Lamb	7
Team Hyundai Denmark	Hyundai i30 N TCR	130	(Denmark) Jan Engelbrecht	2, 4
Team Hyundai Denmark	Hyundai i30 N TCR	130	(Denmark) Søren Jönsson	2, 4
Team Hyundai Denmark	Hyundai i30 N TCR	130	(Denmark) Henrik Sørensen	2, 4
Team Hyundai Denmark	Hyundai i30 N TCR	130	(Denmark) Thomas Sørensen	2
(Lithuania) IGORIO LANKAI	CUPRA León TCR	132	(Lithuania) Sigitas Ambrazevicius	3
(Lithuania) IGORIO LANKAI	CUPRA León TCR	132	(Lithuania) Arūnas Gečiauskas	3
(Lithuania) IGORIO LANKAI	CUPRA León TCR	132	(Lithuania) Dainius Kablys	3
(Hungary) Zengő Motorsport	CUPRA León TCR	133	(Hungary) Tamas Horvath	1
(Hungary) Zengő Motorsport	CUPRA León TCR	133	(Hungary) Gabor Kismarty-Lechner	1
(Hungary) Zengő Motorsport	CUPRA León TCR	133	(Hungary) Gyorgy Kontra	1
(Hungary) Zengő Motorsport	CUPRA León TCR	133	(Hungary) Csaba Tóth	1
(Hungary) Zengő Motorsport	CUPRA León TCR	133	(Hungary) Zoltán Zengő	1
(Spain) Baporo Motorsport	CUPRA León TCR	135	(Kazakhstan) Alexandr Artemyev	6
(Spain) Baporo Motorsport	CUPRA León TCR	135	(Argentina) Marcelo Rafael Ciarrocchi	6
(Spain) Baporo Motorsport	CUPRA León TCR	135	(Argentina) José Manuel Sapag	6
(Spain) Baporo Motorsport	CUPRA León TCR	135	(Italy) Alberto Vescovi	6
(United Kingdom) Team Dynamics with WRC Developments	Audi RS 3 LMS TCR	138	(United Kingdom) Jake Giddings	1
(United Kingdom) Team Dynamics with WRC Developments	Audi RS 3 LMS TCR	138	(United Kingdom) James Kaye	1
(United Kingdom) Team Dynamics with WRC Developments	Audi RS 3 LMS TCR	138	(United Kingdom) Henry Neal	1
(United Kingdom) Team Dynamics with WRC Developments	Audi RS 3 LMS TCR	138	(United Kingdom) Will Neal	1
(United Kingdom) Team Dynamics with WRC Developments	Audi RS 3 LMS TCR	138	(Australia) Aaron Cameron	1
(Germany) Sorg Rennsport	Audi RS 3 LMS TCR	151	(Germany) Emin Akata	3
(Germany) Sorg Rennsport	Audi RS 3 LMS TCR	151	(United States) Zach Arnold	3
(Germany) Sorg Rennsport	Audi RS 3 LMS TCR	151	(Germany) Christoph Hewer	3
(Germany) Sorg Rennsport	Audi RS 3 LMS TCR	151	(Austria) Siegfried Kuzdas	3
(France) TFT Racing / COGEMO / TLRT	Audi RS 3 LMS TCR	154	(France) Bruno Bazaud	1
(France) TFT Racing / COGEMO / TLRT	Audi RS 3 LMS TCR	154	(France) Denis Caillon	1
(France) TFT Racing / COGEMO / TLRT	Audi RS 3 LMS TCR	154	(Belgium) Jean-Lou Rihon	1
(France) TFT Racing / COGEMO / TLRT	Audi RS 3 LMS TCR	154	(France) Sebastien Morales	1
(France) TFT Racing / COGEMO / TLRT	Audi RS 3 LMS TCR	154	(France) Philippe Thirion	1
(San Marino) GDL Racing	Audi RS 3 LMS TCR	157	(Greece) Dimitris Deverikos	3
(San Marino) GDL Racing	Audi RS 3 LMS TCR	157	(Argentina) Andres Josephsohn	3
(San Marino) GDL Racing	Audi RS 3 LMS TCR	157	(Finland) Rory Penttinen	3
(France) Nordschleife Racing	Peugeot 308 Racing Cup	172	(France) Thierry Boyer	5–6
(France) Nordschleife Racing	Peugeot 308 Racing Cup	172	(Canada) Michel Sallenbach	5–6
(France) Nordschleife Racing	Peugeot 308 Racing Cup	172	(France) Michel Derue	5
(France) Nordschleife Racing	Peugeot 308 Racing Cup	172	(France) Guillaume Roman	5
(France) Nordschleife Racing	Peugeot 308 Racing Cup	172	(Russia) Maxim Aronov	6
(France) Nordschleife Racing	Peugeot 308 Racing Cup	172	(Russia) Lev Fridman	6
(France) Nordschleife Racing	Peugeot 308 Racing Cup	172	(Belgium) Philippe Steveny	6
(Belgium) AC Motorsport	Audi RS 3 LMS TCR	188	(France) Stéphane Perrin	All
(Belgium) AC Motorsport	Audi RS 3 LMS TCR	188	(Belgium) Vincent Radermecker	1–4, 6-7
(Belgium) AC Motorsport	Audi RS 3 LMS TCR	188	(Belgium) Tom Boonen	1, 6
(Belgium) AC Motorsport	Audi RS 3 LMS TCR	188	(Belgium) Gilles Magnus	1
(Belgium) AC Motorsport	Audi RS 3 LMS TCR	188	(United Kingdom) James Kaye	2–6
(Belgium) AC Motorsport	Audi RS 3 LMS TCR	188	(Belgium) Mathieu Detry	5–6
(Belgium) AC Motorsport	Audi RS 3 LMS TCR	188	(Belgium) Sam Dejonghe	5
(Belgium) AC Motorsport	Audi RS 3 LMS TCR	188	(United Kingdom) Will Neal	7
(Belgium) AC Motorsport	Audi RS 3 LMS TCR	188	(Canada) Matthew Taskinen	7
SP3
Team	Car	No.	Drivers	Rounds
(Germany) PROsport Performance	Aston Martin Vantage AMR GT4	1	(Belgium) Rodrigue Gillion	3
(Germany) PROsport Performance	Aston Martin Vantage AMR GT4	1	(United Kingdom) Michael Munemann	3
(Germany) PROsport Performance	Aston Martin Vantage AMR GT4	1	(India) Akhil Rabindra	3
(Germany) PROsport Performance	Aston Martin Vantage AMR GT4	1	(Belgium) Nico Verdonck	3
(Czech Republic) RTR Projects	KTM X-Bow	224	(Czech Republic) Erik Janiš	6
(Czech Republic) RTR Projects	KTM X-Bow	224	(Czech Republic) Jan Krabec	6
(Czech Republic) RTR Projects	KTM X-Bow	224	(Czech Republic) Petr Lisa	6
(Czech Republic) RTR Projects	KTM X-Bow	224	(Czech Republic) Tomas Miniberger	6
(Czech Republic) RTR Projects	KTM X-Bow	224	(Czech Republic) Daniel Skalický	6
(France) Vortex V8	Vortex VW Scirocco GC 10	301	(France) Philippe Bonnel	1–2
(France) Vortex V8	Vortex VW Scirocco GC 10	301	(France) Franck Lefèvre	1–2
(France) Vortex V8	Vortex VW Scirocco GC 10	301	(Switzerland) Nicolas Nobs	1–2
(France) Vortex V8	Vortex VW Scirocco GC 10	301	(France) Thomas Cordelier	1
(France) PR&V	Porsche Cayman GT4 CS	302	(Germany) Christian Gloz	6
(France) PR&V	Porsche Cayman GT4 CS	302	(France) Hervé Houdre	6
(France) PR&V	Porsche Cayman GT4 CS	302	(France) Alain Remi	6
(France) PR&V	Porsche Cayman GT4 CS	302	(France) Flavien Remi	6
(Netherlands) Munckhof Racing	BMW M4 GT Silhouette	310	(Netherlands) Eric van den Munckhof	2, 6
(Netherlands) Munckhof Racing	BMW M4 GT Silhouette	310	(Netherlands) Marco Poland	2, 6
(Netherlands) Munckhof Racing	BMW M4 GT Silhouette	310	(Netherlands) Glenn van Berlo	6
(Netherlands) Munckhof Racing	BMW M4 GT Silhouette	310	(Netherlands) Marcel van Berlo	6
(Netherlands) Munckhof Racing	BMW M4 GT Silhouette	310	(Netherlands) Ted van Vilet	6
(Switzerland) Amag First Centri Porsche Ticino	Porsche Cayman GT4 Clubsport	312	(Switzerland) Ivan Jacoma	1–2
(Switzerland) Amag First Centri Porsche Ticino	Porsche Cayman GT4 Clubsport	312	(Switzerland) Valerio Presezzi	1–2
(Switzerland) Amag First Centri Porsche Ticino	Porsche Cayman GT4 Clubsport	312	(Italy) Alessandro Baccani	1
(Switzerland) Amag First Centri Porsche Ticino	Porsche Cayman GT4 Clubsport	312	(Switzerland) Michele Di Bona	1
(Switzerland) Amag First Centri Porsche Ticino	Porsche Cayman GT4 Clubsport	312	(Switzerland) Adriano Pan	1
(Switzerland) Amag First Centri Porsche Ticino	Porsche Cayman GT4 Clubsport	312	(Italy) Matteo Arrigosi	2
(Switzerland) Amag First Centri Porsche Ticino	Porsche Cayman GT4 Clubsport	312	(Switzerland) Ivan Reggiani	2
(United Kingdom) Team ABBA Racing	BMW M3 V8 GTR	334	(United Kingdom) Charles Lamb	4
(United Kingdom) Team ABBA Racing	BMW M3 V8 GTR	334	(United Kingdom) Richard Neary	4
(United Kingdom) Team ABBA Racing	BMW M3 V8 GTR	334	(United Kingdom) Sam Neary	4
(Denmark) Perfection Racing Europe	Ginetta G55 GT4	345	(Denmark) Claus Klostermann	6
(Denmark) Perfection Racing Europe	Ginetta G55 GT4	345	(Denmark) Michael Klostermann	6
(Denmark) Perfection Racing Europe	Ginetta G55 GT4	345	(Denmark) Tommy Laugesen	6
(Denmark) Perfection Racing Europe	Ginetta G55 GT4	345	(Denmark) René Rasmussen	6
(United Kingdom) CWS Engineering	Ginetta G55 GT4	378	(United Kingdom) Colin White	1, 3
(United Kingdom) CWS Engineering	Ginetta G55 GT4	378	(France) Olivier Baron	1
(United Kingdom) CWS Engineering	Ginetta G55 GT4	378	(United Kingdom) Angus Fender	1
(United Kingdom) CWS Engineering	Ginetta G55 GT4	378	(United Kingdom) Steven Wells	1
(United Kingdom) CWS Engineering	Ginetta G55 GT4	378	(United States) Jean-Francois Brunot	3
(United Kingdom) CWS Engineering	Ginetta G55 GT4	378	(United Kingdom) Ian Stinton	3
(United Kingdom) Intersport Racing	BMW M3	614	(United Kingdom) Kevin Clarke	3
(United Kingdom) Intersport Racing	BMW M3	614	(United Kingdom) Peter Hardman	3
(United Kingdom) Intersport Racing	BMW M3	614	(United Kingdom) Stuart Wright	3
A3
Team	Car	No.	Drivers	Rounds
(Netherlands) BMW Team van der Horst	BMW E90 330i	602	(Romania) Alex Cascatau	3
(Netherlands) BMW Team van der Horst	BMW E90 330i	602	(Belgium) Steven Dewulf	3
(Netherlands) BMW Team van der Horst	BMW E90 330i	602	(Italy) Mauro Mercuri	3
(Netherlands) BMW Team van der Horst	BMW E90 330i	602	(Belgium) Bjorn Vinken	3
(Belgium) G & R motorsport	BMW M3 (E46) GT	603	(Belgium) Geert Dierckx	1
(Belgium) G & R motorsport	BMW M3 (E46) GT	603	(Belgium) Jasper Dierckx	1
(Belgium) G & R motorsport	BMW M3 (E46) GT	603	(Belgium) Geert Houdhoofdt	1
(Belgium) G & R motorsport	BMW M3 (E46) GT	603	(Belgium) Danny Van Dosselaer	1
(Belgium) G & R motorsport	BMW M3 (E46) GT	603	(Belgium) Karlo Van Dosselaer	1
(Italy) Lotus PB Racing	Lotus Elise Cup PB-R	633	(Italy) Maurizio Fortina	1
(Italy) Lotus PB Racing	Lotus Elise Cup PB-R	633	(Italy) Marco Fumagalli	1
(Italy) Lotus PB Racing	Lotus Elise Cup PB-R	633	(Italy) Mauro Guastamacchia	1
(Italy) Lotus PB Racing	Lotus Elise Cup PB-R	633	(Italy) Mark Speakerwas	1
(Italy) Lotus PB Racing	Lotus Elise Cup PB-R	633	(Italy) Vito Utzieri	1
(Italy) Lotus PB Racing	Lotus Elise Cup PB-R	634	(Italy) Michael Cordini	1
(Italy) Lotus PB Racing	Lotus Elise Cup PB-R	634	(Italy) Matteo Deflorian	1
(Italy) Lotus PB Racing	Lotus Elise Cup PB-R	634	(Italy) Stefano D'Aste	1
(Italy) Lotus PB Racing	Lotus Elise Cup PB-R	634	(Italy) Nicolò Liana	1
(United Kingdom) WEC Motorsport	BMW M3 (E46) GT	639	(United Kingdom) Dave Cox	2
(United Kingdom) WEC Motorsport	BMW M3 (E46) GT	639	(United Kingdom) Jason Cox	2
(United Kingdom) WEC Motorsport	BMW M3 (E46) GT	639	(United Kingdom) George Haynes	2
(United Kingdom) WEC Motorsport	BMW M3 (E46) GT	639	(United Kingdom) Guy Povey	2
(Austria) Winkler Tuning	BMW E46 123D	666	(Austria) Michael Winkler	3–4
(Austria) Winkler Tuning	BMW E46 123D	666	(Austria) Markus Mair	3
(Austria) Winkler Tuning	BMW E46 123D	666	(Austria) Michael Rienhoff	4
(United Kingdom) Synchro Motorsport	Honda Civic Type R (FK8)	676	(United Kingdom) Alyn James	2–6
(United Kingdom) Synchro Motorsport	Honda Civic Type R (FK8)	676	(United Kingdom) Daniel Wheeler	2–6
(United Kingdom) Synchro Motorsport	Honda Civic Type R (FK8)	676	(United Kingdom) Matt Neal	3, 6
(United Kingdom) Synchro Motorsport	Honda Civic Type R (FK8)	676	(United Kingdom) Martin Byford	5
(Denmark) Dan Agro Racing	Peugeot RCZ A3 GT	685	(Denmark) Nicolaj Kandborg	2–3
(Denmark) Dan Agro Racing	Peugeot RCZ A3 GT	685	(Denmark) Steffan Jusjong	2–3
(Denmark) Dan Agro Racing	Peugeot RCZ A3 GT	685	(Denmark) René Rasmussen	2
(Denmark) Dan Agro Racing	Peugeot RCZ A3 GT	685	(Denmark) Mikkel Gregersen	3
(Denmark) Dan Agro Racing	Peugeot RCZ A3 GT	685	(Denmark) Lars Seistrup	3
(Denmark) Dan Agro Racing	Peugeot RCZ A3 GT	686	(Denmark) Anders Rasmussen	3
(Denmark) Dan Agro Racing	Peugeot RCZ A3 GT	686	(Denmark) Sune Marcussen	3
(Germany) fun-M Motorsport	BMW M240i Racing Cup	802	(Germany) Danny Brink	6
(Germany) fun-M Motorsport	BMW M240i Racing Cup	802	(Germany) Klaus Dieter Frommer	6
(Germany) fun-M Motorsport	BMW M240i Racing Cup	802	(Germany) Harald Rettich	6
(Germany) fun-M Motorsport	BMW M240i Racing Cup	802	(Netherlands) Paul Sieljes	6
(Switzerland) Hofor Racing by Bonk Motorsport	BMW M240i Racing Cup	869	(Germany) Axel Burghardt	2, 4–6
(Switzerland) Hofor Racing by Bonk Motorsport	BMW M240i Racing Cup	869	(Switzerland) Martin Kroll	2, 4–6
(Switzerland) Hofor Racing by Bonk Motorsport	BMW M240i Racing Cup	869	(Germany) Nicole Holzer	2, 4–5
(Switzerland) Hofor Racing by Bonk Motorsport	BMW M240i Racing Cup	869	(Germany) Jurgen Meyer	2, 4
(Switzerland) Hofor Racing by Bonk Motorsport	BMW M240i Racing Cup	869	(Germany) Michael Bonk	5–6
(Switzerland) Hofor Racing by Bonk Motorsport	BMW M240i Racing Cup	869	(Austria) Markus Fischer	5
(Switzerland) Hofor Racing by Bonk Motorsport	BMW M240i Racing Cup	869	(Germany) Volker Piepmeyer	6
(Switzerland) Hofor Racing by Bonk Motorsport	BMW M240i Racing Cup	869	(Austria) Michael Fischer	6
CUP 1
Team	Car	No.	Drivers	Rounds
(Germany) fun-M Motorsport	BMW M235i Racing Cup	802	(Germany) Simon Klemund	1
(Germany) fun-M Motorsport	BMW M235i Racing Cup	802	(Germany) Christopher Rink	1
(Germany) fun-M Motorsport	BMW M235i Racing Cup	802	(Germany) Harald Rettich	1
(Germany) fun-M Motorsport	BMW M235i Racing Cup	802	(Netherlands) Paul Sieljes	1
(Germany) fun-M Motorsport	BMW M235i Racing Cup	802	(Greece) Ioannis Smyrlis	1
(Luxembourg) DUWO Racing	BMW M235i Racing Cup	840	(France) Youssef Bassil	1
(Luxembourg) DUWO Racing	BMW M235i Racing Cup	840	(France) Thierry Chkondali	1
(Luxembourg) DUWO Racing	BMW M235i Racing Cup	840	(Luxembourg) Jean-Marie Dumont	1
(Luxembourg) DUWO Racing	BMW M235i Racing Cup	840	(France) Frédéric Schmit	1
(Luxembourg) DUWO Racing	BMW M235i Racing Cup	840	(France) Nicolas Schmit	1
(Germany) Sorg Rennsport	BMW M235i Racing Cup	851	(Denmark) Michael Nielsen	7
(Germany) Sorg Rennsport	BMW M235i Racing Cup	851	(Denmark) Johan Schwartz	7
(Germany) Sorg Rennsport	BMW M235i Racing Cup	851	(Mexico) Benito Tagle	7
(Germany) Sorg Rennsport	BMW M235i Racing Cup	851	(United States) Frank S. Woody III	7

== Race results ==
Bold indicates overall winner.

Classes	(United Arab Emirates) 24H Dubai Round 1	(Italy) 12H Mugello Round 2	(Belgium) 12H Spa Round 3	(Czech Republic) 12H Brno Round 4	(Portugal) 24H Portimão Round 5	(Spain) 24H Barcelona Round 6	(United States) 24H COTA Round 7
TCR Winners	**(Switzerland) No. 112 Autorama Motorsport** **by Wolf-Power Racing**	**(Switzerland) No. 112 Autorama Motorsport** **by Wolf-Power Racing**	**(Netherlands) No. 101 Red Camel-Jordans.nl**	**(Switzerland) No. 112 Autorama Motorsport** **by Wolf-Power Racing**	**(Switzerland) No. 112 Autorama Motorsport** **by Wolf-Power Racing**	**(Switzerland) No. 131 TOPCAR sport** **by Bas Koeten Racing**	**(Netherlands) No. 101 Red Camel-Jordans.nl**
TCR Winners	**(Switzerland) Fabian Danz** **(Germany) Marlon Menden** **(Switzerland) Yannick Mettler** **(Switzerland) Jérôme Ogay** **(Switzerland) Stefan Tanner**	**(Switzerland) Fabian Danz** **(Denmark) Kristian Jepsen** **(Denmark) Jan Sørensen**	**(Netherlands) Ivo Breukers** **(Netherlands) Rik Breukers**	**(Finland) Antti Buri** **(Switzerland) Fabian Danz** **(Finland) Kari-Pekka Laaksonen**	**(Switzerland) Ralf Henggeler** **(Germany) Marlon Menden** **(Switzerland) Yannick Mettler** **(Switzerland) Jérôme Ogay** **(Switzerland) Stefan Tanner**	**(Switzerland) Julien Apotheloz** **(Finland) Antti Buri** **(Switzerland) Ronny Jost** **(Switzerland) Fabian Danz**	**(Netherlands) Ivo Breukers** **(Canada) Jerimy Daniel** **(Canada) Jean-Francois Hevey** **(United Kingdom) Steven Liquorish**
SP3 Winners	(France) No. 301 Vortex V8	(Switzerland) No. 312 Amag First Centri Porsche Ticino	(Germany) No. 1 PROsport Performance	(United Kingdom) No. 334 Team ABBA Racing	No Entrants	(Czech Republic) No. 224 RTR Projects	No Entrants
SP3 Winners	(France) Philippe Bonnel (France) Thomas Cordelier (France) Franck Lefèvre (Switzerland) Nicolas Nobs	(Italy) Matteo Arrigosi (Switzerland) Ivan Jacoma (Switzerland) Ivan Reggiani (Switzerland) Valerio Presezzi	(Belgium) Rodrigue Gillion (United Kingdom) Michael Munemann (India) Akhil Rabindra (Belgium) Nico Verdonck	(United Kingdom) Charles Lamb (United Kingdom) Richard Neary (United Kingdom) Sam Neary	No Entrants	(Czech Republic) Erik Janiš (Czech Republic) Jan Krabec (Czech Republic) Petr Lisa (Czech Republic) Tomas Miniberger (Czech Republic) Daniel Skalický	No Entrants
A3 Winners	(Belgium) No. 603 G & R motorsport	(Denmark) No. 685 Dan Agro Racing	(Denmark) No. 685 Dan Agro Racing	(United Kingdom) No. 676 Synchro Motorsport	(United Kingdom) No. 676 Synchro Motorsport	(Switzerland) No. 869 Hofor Racing by Bonk Motorsport	No Entrants
A3 Winners	(Belgium) Geert Dierckx (Belgium) Jasper Dierckx (Belgium) Geert Houdhoofdt (Belgium) Danny Van Dosselaer (Belgium) Karlo Van Dosselaer	(Denmark) Steffan Jusjong (Denmark) Nicolaj Kandborg (Denmark) René Rasmussen	(Denmark) Mikkel Gregersen (Denmark) Steffan Jusjong (Denmark) Nicolaj Kandborg (Denmark) Lars Seistrup	(United Kingdom) Alyn James (United Kingdom) Daniel Wheeler	(United Kingdom) Martin Byford (United Kingdom) Alyn James (United Kingdom) Daniel Wheeler	(Germany) Michael Bonk (Germany) Axel Burghardt (Austria) Michael Fischer (Switzerland) Martin Kroll (Germany) Volker Piepmeyer	No Entrants
CUP1 Winners	(Germany) No. 802 fun-M Motorsport	Merged with A3 Class	No Entrants	Merged with A3 Class			(Germany) No. 851 Sorg Rennsport
CUP1 Winners	(Germany) Simon Klemund (Germany) Christopher Rink (Germany) Harald Rettich (Netherlands) Paul Sieljes (Greece) Ioannis Smyrlis	Merged with A3 Class	No Entrants	Merged with A3 Class			(Denmark) Michael Nielsen (Denmark) Johan Schwartz (Mexico) Benito Tagle (United States) Frank S. Woody III

== See also ==
- 24H Series
- 2019 24H GT Series
- 2019 Dubai 24 Hour
- 2019 24H Middle East Series
