= 2019 24H GT Series =

The 2019 24H GT Series powered by Hankook was the fifth season of the 24H Series with drivers battling for championship points and titles and the eleventh season since Creventic, the organiser and promoter of the series, organises multiple races a year. The races were contested with GT3-spec cars, GT4-spec cars, sports cars and 24H-Specials, like silhouette cars.

== Calendar ==
Round	Event	Circuit	Date	Report
1	24H Dubai	Dubai Autodrome, Dubai, United Arab Emirates	11–13 January	Report
2	12H Mugello	Mugello Circuit, Mugello, Italy	29–30 March	Report
3	12H Spa	Circuit de Spa-Francorchamps, Spa, Belgium	19–20 April	Report
4	12H Brno	Brno Circuit, Brno, Czech Republic	24–26 May	Report
5	24H Portimão	Algarve International Circuit, Portimão, Portugal	6–8 July	Report
6	24H Barcelona	Circuit de Barcelona-Catalunya, Montmeló, Spain	30 August–1 September	Report
7	24H COTA	Circuit of the Americas, Austin, United States	16–18 November	Report

Race is part of the Championship of the Continents
Race is part of the European Championship
Race is part of both the Championship of the Continents and the European Championship

== Entry list ==
A6
Team	Car	No.	Drivers	Class	Rounds
(Germany) (United Arab Emirates) / Black Falcon (Note: Cars No. 2 and No. 4 entered as Black Falcon and car No. 3 entered as Abu Dhabi Racing Black Falcon.); (Germany) (United Arab Emirates) / Abu Dhabi Racing Black Falcon	Mercedes-AMG GT3	2	(Saudi Arabia) Abdulaziz Al Faisal	A6	1
(Germany) (United Arab Emirates) / Black Falcon; (Germany) (United Arab Emirates) / Abu Dhabi Racing Black Falcon	Mercedes-AMG GT3	2	(Saudi Arabia) Saud Al Faisal	A6	1
(Germany) (United Arab Emirates) / Black Falcon; (Germany) (United Arab Emirates) / Abu Dhabi Racing Black Falcon	Mercedes-AMG GT3	2	(Netherlands) Yelmer Buurman	A6	1
(Germany) (United Arab Emirates) / Black Falcon; (Germany) (United Arab Emirates) / Abu Dhabi Racing Black Falcon	Mercedes-AMG GT3	2	(United Kingdom) Adam Christodoulou	A6	1
(Germany) (United Arab Emirates) / Black Falcon; (Germany) (United Arab Emirates) / Abu Dhabi Racing Black Falcon	Mercedes-AMG GT3	2	(Germany) Hubert Haupt	A6	1
(Germany) (United Arab Emirates) / Black Falcon; (Germany) (United Arab Emirates) / Abu Dhabi Racing Black Falcon	Mercedes-AMG GT3	3	(United Arab Emirates) Khaled Al Qubaisi	A6	1
(Germany) (United Arab Emirates) / Black Falcon; (Germany) (United Arab Emirates) / Abu Dhabi Racing Black Falcon	Mercedes-AMG GT3	3	(Netherlands) Jeroen Bleekemolen	A6	1
(Germany) (United Arab Emirates) / Black Falcon; (Germany) (United Arab Emirates) / Abu Dhabi Racing Black Falcon	Mercedes-AMG GT3	3	(United States) Ben Keating	A6	1
(Germany) (United Arab Emirates) / Black Falcon; (Germany) (United Arab Emirates) / Abu Dhabi Racing Black Falcon	Mercedes-AMG GT3	3	(Germany) Manuel Metzger	A6	1
(Germany) (United Arab Emirates) / Black Falcon; (Germany) (United Arab Emirates) / Abu Dhabi Racing Black Falcon	Mercedes-AMG GT3	3	(Germany) Luca Stolz	A6	1
(Germany) (United Arab Emirates) / Black Falcon; (Germany) (United Arab Emirates) / Abu Dhabi Racing Black Falcon	Mercedes-AMG GT3	4	(United States) Ben Keating	A6	7
(Germany) (United Arab Emirates) / Black Falcon; (Germany) (United Arab Emirates) / Abu Dhabi Racing Black Falcon	Mercedes-AMG GT3	4	(Netherlands) Jeroen Bleekemolen	A6	7
(Germany) (United Arab Emirates) / Black Falcon; (Germany) (United Arab Emirates) / Abu Dhabi Racing Black Falcon	Mercedes-AMG GT3	4	(Brazil) Felipe Fraga	A6	7
(Germany) (United Arab Emirates) / Black Falcon; (Germany) (United Arab Emirates) / Abu Dhabi Racing Black Falcon	Mercedes-AMG GT3	4	(United States) Cooper MacNeil	A6	7
(Germany) MDC-Sports	Mercedes-AMG GT3	4	(Switzerland) Adrian Zumstein	A6	2, 4
(Germany) MDC-Sports	Mercedes-AMG GT3	4	(Switzerland) Manuel Zumstein	A6	2, 4
(Germany) MDC-Sports	Mercedes-AMG GT3	4	(Switzerland) Philipp Zumstein	A6	2, 4
(Germany) Phoenix Racing	Audi R8 LMS Evo	5	(Germany) Vincent Kolb	A6	3
(Germany) Phoenix Racing	Audi R8 LMS Evo	5	(Spain) Ivan Pareras	A6	3
(Germany) Phoenix Racing	Audi R8 LMS Evo	5	(Germany) Kim-Luis Schramm	A6	3
(Germany) Phoenix Racing	Audi R8 LMS Evo	5	(Germany) Frank Stippler	A6	3
(Saudi Arabia) (Belgium) / MS7 by WRT (Note: Car No. 7 entered as WS7 by WRT and cars No. 27 entered as Belgian Audi Club Team WRT.); (Saudi Arabia) (Belgium) / Belgian Audi Club Team WRT	Audi R8 LMS Evo	7	(Saudi Arabia) Mohammed Bin Saud Al Saud	A6	1
(Saudi Arabia) (Belgium) / MS7 by WRT; (Saudi Arabia) (Belgium) / Belgian Audi Club Team WRT	Audi R8 LMS Evo	7	(Germany) Christopher Mies	A6	1
(Saudi Arabia) (Belgium) / MS7 by WRT; (Saudi Arabia) (Belgium) / Belgian Audi Club Team WRT	Audi R8 LMS Evo	7	(Belgium) Dries Vanthoor	A6	1
(Saudi Arabia) (Belgium) / MS7 by WRT; (Saudi Arabia) (Belgium) / Belgian Audi Club Team WRT	Audi R8 LMS Evo	7	(Netherlands) Michael Vergers	A6	1
(Saudi Arabia) (Belgium) / MS7 by WRT; (Saudi Arabia) (Belgium) / Belgian Audi Club Team WRT	Audi R8 LMS Evo	27	(Netherlands) Rik Breukers	A6	3
(Saudi Arabia) (Belgium) / MS7 by WRT; (Saudi Arabia) (Belgium) / Belgian Audi Club Team WRT	Audi R8 LMS Evo	27	(Russia) Stanislav Minsky	A6	3
(Saudi Arabia) (Belgium) / MS7 by WRT; (Saudi Arabia) (Belgium) / Belgian Audi Club Team WRT	Audi R8 LMS Evo	27	(Netherlands) Steijn Schothorst	A6	3
(Saudi Arabia) (Belgium) / MS7 by WRT; (Saudi Arabia) (Belgium) / Belgian Audi Club Team WRT	Audi R8 LMS Evo	27	(Germany) Marco Seefried	A6	3
(Poland) OLIMP Racing	Audi R8 LMS Evo	8	(Poland) Karol Basz	A6	4
(Poland) OLIMP Racing	Audi R8 LMS Evo	8	(Poland) Marcin Jedlinski	A6	4
(Poland) OLIMP Racing	Audi R8 LMS Evo	8	(Poland) Mateusz Lisowski	A6	4
(Germany) Team BWT Mücke Motorsport	Audi R8 LMS Evo	9	(Germany) Mike David Ortmann	A6	1
(Germany) Team BWT Mücke Motorsport	Audi R8 LMS Evo	9	(Switzerland) Ricardo Feller	A6	1
(Germany) Team BWT Mücke Motorsport	Audi R8 LMS Evo	9	(Germany) Stefan Mücke	A6	1
(Germany) Team BWT Mücke Motorsport	Audi R8 LMS Evo	9	(Germany) Marcus Winkelhock	A6	1
(Germany) Team BWT Mücke Motorsport	Audi R8 LMS Evo	9	(Germany) Andreas Weishaupt	A6	1
(Switzerland) Hofor-Racing	Mercedes-AMG GT3	10	(Netherlands) Christiaan Frankenhout	A6	1–3, 6
(Switzerland) Hofor-Racing	Mercedes-AMG GT3	10	(Germany) Kenneth Heyer	A6	1–3, 6
(Switzerland) Hofor-Racing	Mercedes-AMG GT3	10	(Switzerland) Michael Kroll	A6	1–3, 6
(Switzerland) Hofor-Racing	Mercedes-AMG GT3	10	(Germany) Alexander Prinz	A6	1–3, 6
(Switzerland) Hofor-Racing	Mercedes-AMG GT3	10	(Switzerland) Chantal Prinz	A6	1
(Switzerland) Hofor-Racing	Mercedes-AMG GT3	10	(Belgium) Wim Spinoy	A6	6
(Czech Republic) Bohemia Energy racing with Scuderia Praha	Ferrari 488 GT3	11	(Czech Republic) Josef Král	A6	1–6
(Czech Republic) Bohemia Energy racing with Scuderia Praha	Ferrari 488 GT3	11	(Italy) Matteo Malucelli	A6	1–6
(Czech Republic) Bohemia Energy racing with Scuderia Praha	Ferrari 488 GT3	11	(Czech Republic) Jiří Písařík	A6	1–6
(Italy) Target Racing	Lamborghini Huracán GT3	12	(Italy) Giacomo Altoè	A6	1
(Italy) Target Racing	Lamborghini Huracán GT3	12	(Germany) Alex Autumn	A6	1
(Italy) Target Racing	Lamborghini Huracán GT3	12	(Russia) Timur Boguslavskiy	A6	1
(Italy) Target Racing	Lamborghini Huracán GT3	12	(Italy) Stefano Costantini	A6	1
(Italy) Target Racing	Lamborghini Huracán GT3	12	(Denmark) Dennis Lind	A6	1
(Belgium) Speed Lover	Audi R8 LMS Ultra	14	(United States) Dominique Bastien	A6	2
(Belgium) Speed Lover	Audi R8 LMS Ultra	14	(Belgium) Jimmy de Breucker	A6	2
(Germany) Toksport WRT	Mercedes-AMG GT3	15	(Germany) Joachim Bölting	A63; A65	3, 5
(Germany) Toksport WRT	Mercedes-AMG GT3	15	(Germany) Hendrik Still	A63; A65	3, 5
(Germany) Toksport WRT	Mercedes-AMG GT3	15	(Germany) Luca Stolz	A63; A65	3
(Germany) Toksport WRT	Mercedes-AMG GT3	15	(Switzerland) Nikolaj Rogivue	A63; A65	5
(Germany) Toksport WRT	Mercedes-AMG GT3	15	(Germany) Peter Terting	A63; A65	5
(Germany) Toksport WRT	Mercedes-AMG GT3	15	(Germany) Wolfgang Triller	A63; A65	5
(Germany) Toksport WRT	Mercedes-AMG GT3	70	(Australia) Nick Foster	A6	7
(Germany) Toksport WRT	Mercedes-AMG GT3	70	(Australia) Martin Berry	A6	7
(Germany) Toksport WRT	Mercedes-AMG GT3	70	(China) Eric Zang	A6	7
(Germany) Toksport WRT	Mercedes-AMG GT3	70	(United States) George Kurtz	A6	7
(Germany) Toksport WRT	Mercedes-AMG GT3	90	(Germany) Luca Stolz	A6	7
(Germany) Toksport WRT	Mercedes-AMG GT3	90	(Germany) Hendrik Still	A6	7
(Germany) Toksport WRT	Mercedes-AMG GT3	90	(Austria) Martin Konrad	A6	7
(Germany) Toksport WRT	Mercedes-AMG GT3	90	(Zimbabwe) Axcil Jefferies	A6	7
(Germany) SPS automotive performance	Mercedes-AMG GT3	16	(Germany) Tim Müller	A6	2
(Germany) SPS automotive performance	Mercedes-AMG GT3	16	(United Kingdom) Tom Onslow-Cole	A6	2
(Germany) SPS automotive performance	Mercedes-AMG GT3	16	(Germany) Valentin Pierburg	A6	2
(France) IDEC SPORT RACING	Mercedes-AMG GT3	17	(France) Dimitri Enjalbert	A6	2–3, 5
(France) IDEC SPORT RACING	Mercedes-AMG GT3	17	(France) Patrice Lafargue	A6	2–3, 5
(France) IDEC SPORT RACING	Mercedes-AMG GT3	17	(France) Paul Lafargue	A6	2–3, 5
(France) IDEC SPORT RACING	Mercedes-AMG GT3	17	(France) Nicolas Minassian	A6	5
(Netherlands) V8 Racing	Chevrolet Corvette C6.R ZR1	18	(Netherlands) Rick Abresch	A6	1
(Netherlands) V8 Racing	Chevrolet Corvette C6.R ZR1	18	(Netherlands) Max Braams	A6	1
(Netherlands) V8 Racing	Chevrolet Corvette C6.R ZR1	18	(Netherlands) Duncan Huisman	A6	1
(Netherlands) V8 Racing	Chevrolet Corvette C6.R ZR1	18	(United Kingdom) Finlay Hutchison	A6	1
(Netherlands) V8 Racing	Chevrolet Corvette C6.R ZR1	18	(Netherlands) Wolf Nathan	A6	1
(Netherlands) MP Motorsport	Mercedes-AMG GT3	19	(Netherlands) Bert de Heus	A6	1
(Netherlands) MP Motorsport	Mercedes-AMG GT3	19	(Netherlands) Daniël de Jong	A6	1
(Netherlands) MP Motorsport	Mercedes-AMG GT3	19	(Netherlands) Henk de Jong	A6	1
(Netherlands) MP Motorsport	Mercedes-AMG GT3	19	(Netherlands) Jaap van Lagen	A6	1
(Germany) Wochenspiegel Team Monschau	Ferrari 488 GT3	21	(Germany) Oliver Kainz	A6	2
(Germany) Wochenspiegel Team Monschau	Ferrari 488 GT3	21	(Germany) Nico Menzel	A6	2
(Germany) Wochenspiegel Team Monschau	Ferrari 488 GT3	21	(South Africa) David Perel	A6	2
(Germany) Wochenspiegel Team Monschau	Ferrari 488 GT3	21	(Germany) Leonard Weiss	A6	2
(Germany) Wochenspiegel Team Monschau	Ferrari 488 GT3	22	(Germany) Jochen Krumbach	A6	2, 5–6
(Germany) Wochenspiegel Team Monschau	Ferrari 488 GT3	22	(Germany) Georg Weiss	A6	2, 5–6
(Germany) Wochenspiegel Team Monschau	Ferrari 488 GT3	22	(Germany) Hendrik Still	A6	2, 6
(Germany) Wochenspiegel Team Monschau	Ferrari 488 GT3	22	(Germany) Daniel Keilwitz	A6	2
(Germany) Wochenspiegel Team Monschau	Ferrari 488 GT3	22	(Germany) Leonard Weiss	A6	5–6
(Germany) Wochenspiegel Team Monschau	Ferrari 488 GT3	22	(South Africa) David Perel	A6	5
(Germany) Wochenspiegel Team Monschau	Ferrari 488 GT3	22	(Germany) Oliver Kainz	A6	3–4
(Germany) Wochenspiegel Team Monschau	Ferrari 488 GT3	22	(Germany) Jochen Krumbach	A6	3–4
(Germany) Wochenspiegel Team Monschau	Ferrari 488 GT3	22	(Germany) Georg Weiss	A6	3–4
(Germany) Wochenspiegel Team Monschau	Ferrari 488 GT3	22	(Germany) Leonard Weiss	A6	3–4
(Germany) Wochenspiegel Team Monschau	Ferrari 488 GT3	22	(South Africa) David Perel	A6	3
(Germany) Wochenspiegel Team Monschau	Ferrari 488 GT3	22	(Germany) Hendrik Still	A6	4
(Hong Kong) KCMG	Nissan GT-R Nismo GT3	23	(Australia) Josh Burdon	A6	1
(Hong Kong) KCMG	Nissan GT-R Nismo GT3	23	(Switzerland) Alexandre Imperatori	A6	1
(Hong Kong) KCMG	Nissan GT-R Nismo GT3	23	(United Kingdom) Oliver Jarvis	A6	1
(Hong Kong) KCMG	Nissan GT-R Nismo GT3	23	(Italy) Edoardo Liberati	A6	1
(Hong Kong) KCMG	Nissan GT-R Nismo GT3	23	(Germany) Philipp Wlazik	A6	1
(Hong Kong) KCMG	Nissan GT-R Nismo GT3	35	(Australia) Josh Burdon	A6	1
(Hong Kong) KCMG	Nissan GT-R Nismo GT3	35	(Japan) Katsumasa Chiyo	A6	1
(Hong Kong) KCMG	Nissan GT-R Nismo GT3	35	(Italy) Andrea Gagliardini	A6	1
(Hong Kong) KCMG	Nissan GT-R Nismo GT3	35	(Japan) Tsugio Matsuda	A6	1
(Hong Kong) KCMG	Nissan GT-R Nismo GT3	35	(Hong Kong) Shaun Thong	A6	1
(United Arab Emirates) / GP Extreme (Note: Round 1 entered as GP Extreme and cars Rounds 5-6 entered as GPX Racing.); (United Arab Emirates) / GPX Racing	Porsche 911 GT3 R	24	(South Africa) Jordan Grogor	A6	1, 5–6
(United Arab Emirates) / GP Extreme; (United Arab Emirates) / GPX Racing	Porsche 911 GT3 R	24	(Netherlands) Nicky Pastorelli	A6	1, 5–6
(United Arab Emirates) / GP Extreme; (United Arab Emirates) / GPX Racing	Porsche 911 GT3 R	24	(France) Jean-Pierre Valentini	A6	1, 5–6
(United Arab Emirates) / GP Extreme; (United Arab Emirates) / GPX Racing	Porsche 911 GT3 R	24	(United Kingdom) Stuart Hall	A6	1, 6
(United Arab Emirates) / GP Extreme; (United Arab Emirates) / GPX Racing	Porsche 911 GT3 R	24	(Ivory Coast) Frédéric Fatien	A6	1
(United Arab Emirates) / GP Extreme; (United Arab Emirates) / GPX Racing	Porsche 911 GT3 R	24	(France) Alexandre Cougnaud	A6	5
(United Arab Emirates) / GP Extreme; (United Arab Emirates) / GPX Racing	Porsche 911 GT3 R	24	(Germany) Benjamin Goethe	A6	6
(Germany) / Mann-Filter Team HTP Motorsport (Note: Car No. 25 entered as Mann-Filter Team HTP Motorsport at Round 1 and as Winward Racing/HTP Motorsport at Round 3.); (Germany) / Winward Racing/HTP Motorsport	Mercedes-AMG GT3	25	(Luxembourg) Brice Bosi	A6	1
(Germany) / Mann-Filter Team HTP Motorsport; (Germany) / Winward Racing/HTP Motorsport	Mercedes-AMG GT3	25	(Netherlands) Indy Dontje	A6	1
(Germany) / Mann-Filter Team HTP Motorsport; (Germany) / Winward Racing/HTP Motorsport	Mercedes-AMG GT3	25	(Austria) Alexander Hrachowina	A6	1
(Germany) / Mann-Filter Team HTP Motorsport; (Germany) / Winward Racing/HTP Motorsport	Mercedes-AMG GT3	25	(Austria) Martin Konrad	A6	1
(Germany) / Mann-Filter Team HTP Motorsport; (Germany) / Winward Racing/HTP Motorsport	Mercedes-AMG GT3	25	(Germany) Bernd Schneider	A6	1
(Germany) / Mann-Filter Team HTP Motorsport; (Germany) / Winward Racing/HTP Motorsport	Mercedes-AMG GT3	25	(United Kingdom) Philip Ellis	A6	3
(Germany) / Mann-Filter Team HTP Motorsport; (Germany) / Winward Racing/HTP Motorsport	Mercedes-AMG GT3	25	(United States) Bryce Ward	A6	3
(Germany) / Mann-Filter Team HTP Motorsport; (Germany) / Winward Racing/HTP Motorsport	Mercedes-AMG GT3	25	(United States) Russell Ward	A6	3
(France) Saintéloc Racing	Audi R8 LMS Evo	26	(France) Daniel Desbrueres	A6	1
(France) Saintéloc Racing	Audi R8 LMS Evo	26	(France) Simon Gachet	A6	1
(France) Saintéloc Racing	Audi R8 LMS Evo	26	(Luxembourg) Christian Kelders	A6	1
(France) Saintéloc Racing	Audi R8 LMS Evo	26	(France) Nyls Stievenart	A6	1
(France) Saintéloc Racing	Audi R8 LMS Evo	26	(Belgium) Pierre-Yves Paque	A6	1
(Netherlands) Equipe Verschuur	Renault R.S. 01 FGT3	29	(Netherlands) Jarno Goesten	A6	6
(Netherlands) Equipe Verschuur	Renault R.S. 01 FGT3	29	(Netherlands) Harrie Kolen	A6	6
(Netherlands) Equipe Verschuur	Renault R.S. 01 FGT3	29	(Netherlands) Erik van Loon	A6	6
(Netherlands) Equipe Verschuur	Renault R.S. 01 FGT3	29	(Netherlands) Hoevert Vos	A6	6
(Germany) Frikadelli Racing	Porsche 911 GT3 R	31	(Germany) Klaus Abbelen	A6	6
(Germany) Frikadelli Racing	Porsche 911 GT3 R	31	(Germany) Lance David Arnold	A6	6
(Germany) Frikadelli Racing	Porsche 911 GT3 R	31	(Germany) Felipe Fernández Laser	A6	6
(Germany) Frikadelli Racing	Porsche 911 GT3 R	31	(Germany) Alex Müller	A6	6
(Italy) Imperiale Racing	Lamborghini Huracán GT3	32	(Italy) Kikko Galbiati	A6	2
(Italy) Imperiale Racing	Lamborghini Huracán GT3	32	(Czech Republic) Jaromir Jirik	A6	2
(Italy) Imperiale Racing	Lamborghini Huracán GT3	32	(Italy) Vito Postiglione	A6	2
(Germany) Car Collection Motorsport	Audi R8 LMS Evo	33	(Austria) Simon Reicher	A6	1–2
(Germany) Car Collection Motorsport	Audi R8 LMS Evo	33	(Australia) Martin Berry	A6	1
(Germany) Car Collection Motorsport	Audi R8 LMS Evo	33	(Germany) Klaus Koch	A6	1
(Germany) Car Collection Motorsport	Audi R8 LMS Evo	33	(Austria) Philipp Sager	A6	1
(Germany) Car Collection Motorsport	Audi R8 LMS Evo	33	(Germany) Murad Sultanov	A6	1
(Germany) Car Collection Motorsport	Audi R8 LMS Evo	33	(Germany) Stefan Aust	A6	2
(Germany) Car Collection Motorsport	Audi R8 LMS Evo	33	(Germany) Christian Bollrath	A6	2
(Germany) Car Collection Motorsport	Audi R8 LMS Evo	33	(Germany) Peter Schmidt	A6	2
(Germany) Car Collection Motorsport	Audi R8 LMS Evo	34	(Germany) Johannes Kirchhoff	A6	All
(Germany) Car Collection Motorsport	Audi R8 LMS Evo	34	(Germany) Ingo Vogler	A6	1–2, 4–7
(Germany) Car Collection Motorsport	Audi R8 LMS Evo	34	(Germany) Elmar Grimm	A6	1–2, 5–7
(Germany) Car Collection Motorsport	Audi R8 LMS Evo	34	(Germany) Gustav Edelhoff	A6	1, 3, 5–7
(Germany) Car Collection Motorsport	Audi R8 LMS Evo	34	(Germany) Max Edelhoff	A6	2–7
(Germany) Car Collection Motorsport	Audi R8 LMS Evo	88	(Netherlands) Rik Breukers	A6	1–2
(Germany) Car Collection Motorsport	Audi R8 LMS Evo	88	(Germany) Dimitri Parhofer	A6	1–2
(Germany) Car Collection Motorsport	Audi R8 LMS Evo	88	(Germany) Christopher Haase	A6	1
(Germany) Car Collection Motorsport	Audi R8 LMS Evo	88	(Belgium) Frédéric Vervisch	A6	1
(Germany) Car Collection Motorsport	Audi R8 LMS Evo	88	(Germany) Markus Pommer	A6	2
(Germany) Car Collection Motorsport	Audi R8 LMS Evo	88	(Spain) Toni Forné	A6	2
(Germany) Car Collection Motorsport	Audi R8 LMS Evo	88	(Germany) Jürgen Häring	A6	4, 6
(Germany) Car Collection Motorsport	Audi R8 LMS Evo	88	(Greece) Taki Konstantinou	A6	4, 6
(Germany) Car Collection Motorsport	Audi R8 LMS Evo	88	(Germany) Tim Müller	A6	4, 6
(Germany) Car Collection Motorsport	Audi R8 LMS Evo	88	(Germany) Markus Winkelhock	A6	4
(Germany) Car Collection Motorsport	Audi R8 LMS Evo	88	(Germany) Pierre Kaffer	A6	6
(Germany) Car Collection Motorsport	Audi R8 LMS Evo	88	(Austria) Simon Reicher	A6	6
(Austria) HB Racing by Herberth Motorsport	Ferrari 488 GT3	41	(Germany) Jürgen Häring	A6	3
(Austria) HB Racing by Herberth Motorsport	Ferrari 488 GT3	41	(Greece) Taki Konstantinou	A6	3
(Austria) HB Racing by Herberth Motorsport	Ferrari 488 GT3	41	(Germany) Tim Müller	A6	3
(Austria) HB Racing by Herberth Motorsport	Ferrari 488 GT3	41	(Germany) Alfred Renauer	A6	3
(Austria) HB Racing by Herberth Motorsport	Ferrari 488 GT3	41	(United States) Nick Mancuso	A6	7
(Austria) HB Racing by Herberth Motorsport	Ferrari 488 GT3	41	(Italy) Angelo Negro	A6	7
(Austria) HB Racing by Herberth Motorsport	Ferrari 488 GT3	41	(Switzerland) Nikolaj Rogivue	A6	7
(Germany) Rinaldi Racing	Ferrari 488 GT3	47	(Germany) Klaus-Dieter Frers	A6	2–3
(Germany) Rinaldi Racing	Ferrari 488 GT3	47	(Italy) Andrea Montermini	A6	2–3
(Germany) Rinaldi Racing	Ferrari 488 GT3	47	(Italy) Andrea Fontana	A6	2
(Germany) Rinaldi Racing	Ferrari 488 GT3	47	(Germany) Wolfgang Triller	A6	2
(Germany) Rinaldi Racing	Ferrari 488 GT3	47	(Australia) Martin Berry	A6	3
(Germany) Rinaldi Racing	Ferrari 488 GT3	47	(Germany) Pierre Ehret	A6	3
(Germany) Rinaldi Racing	Ferrari 488 GT3	48	(Australia) Martin Berry	A6	2
(Germany) Rinaldi Racing	Ferrari 488 GT3	48	(Finland) Rory Penttinen	A6	2
(Germany) Rinaldi Racing	Ferrari 488 GT3	48	(Germany) Pierre Ehret	A6	2
(Germany) Rinaldi Racing	Ferrari 488 GT3	48	(Germany) Florian Scholze	A6	2
(Germany) Rinaldi Racing	Ferrari 488 GT3	69	(Germany) Christian Hook	A6	2
(Germany) Rinaldi Racing	Ferrari 488 GT3	69	(Germany) Manuel Lauck	A6	2
(Germany) Rinaldi Racing	Ferrari 488 GT3	69	(Germany) Steve Parrow	A6	2
(Austria) GRT Grasser Racing Team	Lamborghini Huracán GT3	63	(Italy) Mirko Bortolotti	A6	1, 3
(Austria) GRT Grasser Racing Team	Lamborghini Huracán GT3	63	(Germany) Christian Engelhart	A6	1, 3
(Austria) GRT Grasser Racing Team	Lamborghini Huracán GT3	63	(Switzerland) Rolf Ineichen	A6	1, 3
(Austria) GRT Grasser Racing Team	Lamborghini Huracán GT3	63	(Switzerland) Mark Ineichen	A6	1
(Austria) GRT Grasser Racing Team	Lamborghini Huracán GT3	63	(Italy) Stefano Costantini	A6	3
(Germany) Attempto Racing	Audi R8 LMS Evo	66	(Switzerland) Adrian Amstutz	A6	1
(Germany) Attempto Racing	Audi R8 LMS Evo	66	(Italy) Mattia Drudi	A6	1
(Germany) Attempto Racing	Audi R8 LMS Evo	66	(Finland) Patrick Kujala	A6	1
(Germany) Attempto Racing	Audi R8 LMS Evo	66	(South Africa) Kelvin van der Linde	A6	1
(Germany) Attempto Racing	Audi R8 LMS Evo	66	(Slovakia) Stanislav Minsky	A6	1
(Germany) Attempto Racing	Audi R8 LMS Evo	99	(Austria) Klaus Bachler	A6	1
(Germany) Attempto Racing	Audi R8 LMS Evo	99	(Germany) Marvin Dienst	A6	1
(Germany) Attempto Racing	Audi R8 LMS Evo	99	(Australia) Nick Foster	A6	1
(Germany) Attempto Racing	Audi R8 LMS Evo	99	(Slovakia) Stanislav Minsky	A6	1
(Germany) Attempto Racing	Audi R8 LMS Evo	99	(Netherlands) Steijn Schothorst	A6	1
(United States) VOLT Racing	Porsche 911 GT3 R	73	(United States) Alan Brynjolfsson	A6	7
(United States) VOLT Racing	Porsche 911 GT3 R	73	(United States) Trent Hindman	A6	7
(United States) VOLT Racing	Porsche 911 GT3 R	73	(Belgium) Jan Heylen	A6	7
(United States) VOLT Racing	Porsche 911 GT3 R	73	(United States) Richard Heistand	A6	7
(United Kingdom) Barwell Motorsport	Lamborghini Huracán GT3 Evo	77	(Switzerland) Adrian Amstutz	A6	2, 6
(United Kingdom) Barwell Motorsport	Lamborghini Huracán GT3 Evo	77	(United Kingdom) Phil Keen	A6	2
(United Kingdom) Barwell Motorsport	Lamborghini Huracán GT3 Evo	77	(Finland) Patrick Kujala	A6	2, 6
(United Kingdom) Barwell Motorsport	Lamborghini Huracán GT3 Evo	77	(Denmark) Dennis Lind	A6	6
(United Kingdom) Barwell Motorsport	Lamborghini Huracán GT3 Evo	77	(Russia) Leonid Machitski	A6	6
(United States) CP Racing	Mercedes-AMG GT3	85	(United States) Charles Espenlaub	A6	All
(United States) CP Racing	Mercedes-AMG GT3	85	(United States) Joe Foster	A6	All
(United States) CP Racing	Mercedes-AMG GT3	85	(United States) Charles Putman	A6	All
(United States) CP Racing	Mercedes-AMG GT3	85	(United States) Shane Lewis	A6	1, 5, 7
(United States) CP Racing	Mercedes-AMG GT3	85	(United States) Darren Law	A6	6
(Germany) Herberth Motorsport	Porsche 911 GT3 R 1 Porsche 911 GT3 R (19) 2	91	(Switzerland) Daniel Allemann	A6 1 A6 2	All
(Germany) Herberth Motorsport	Porsche 911 GT3 R 1 Porsche 911 GT3 R (19) 2	91	(Germany) Ralf Bohn	A6 1 A6 2	All
(Germany) Herberth Motorsport	Porsche 911 GT3 R 1 Porsche 911 GT3 R (19) 2	91	(Germany) Robert Renauer	A6 1 A6 2	All
(Germany) Herberth Motorsport	Porsche 911 GT3 R 1 Porsche 911 GT3 R (19) 2	91	(Germany) Alfred Renauer	A6 1 A6 2	1–2, 5, 7
(Germany) Herberth Motorsport	Porsche 911 GT3 R 1 Porsche 911 GT3 R (19) 2	91	(Germany) Sven Müller	A6 1 A6 2	6
(Germany) Herberth Motorsport	Porsche 911 GT3 R (19)	93	(Germany) Edward Lewis Brauner	A6	2–6
(Germany) Herberth Motorsport	Porsche 911 GT3 R (19)	93	(Greece) Taki Konstantinou	A6	2
(Germany) Herberth Motorsport	Porsche 911 GT3 R (19)	93	(Germany) Jürgen Häring	A6	2
(Germany) Herberth Motorsport	Porsche 911 GT3 R (19)	93	(Germany) Alfred Renauer	A6	2
(Germany) Herberth Motorsport	Porsche 911 GT3 R (19)	93	(Germany) Stefan Aust	A6	3–6
(Germany) Herberth Motorsport	Porsche 911 GT3 R (19)	93	(Austria) Helmut Rödig	A6	3
(Germany) Herberth Motorsport	Porsche 911 GT3 R (19)	93	(Austria) Zeljko Drmic	A6	4, 6
(Germany) Herberth Motorsport	Porsche 911 GT3 R (19)	93	(Austria) Klaus Bachler	A6	5–6
(Germany) Herberth Motorsport	Porsche 911 GT3 R (19)	93	(Germany) Klaus Rader	A6	5
(Germany) Herberth Motorsport	Porsche 911 GT3 R (19)	93	(Germany) Hans Wehrmann	A6	5
(Germany) Herberth Motorsport	Porsche 911 GT3 R (19)	93	(Germany) Vincent Kolb	A6	6
(Germany) Herberth Motorsport	Porsche 911 GT3 R (19)	94	(Germany) Jürgen Häring	A6	5
(Germany) Herberth Motorsport	Porsche 911 GT3 R (19)	94	(Greece) Taki Konstantinou	A6	5
(Germany) Herberth Motorsport	Porsche 911 GT3 R (19)	94	(Germany) Tim Müller	A6	5
(Germany) Herberth Motorsport	Porsche 911 GT3 R (19)	94	(Germany) Alfred Renauer	A6	5
(Germany) Herberth Motorsport	Porsche 911 GT3 R (19)	94	(Germany) Joachim Thyssen	A6	5
Team Porsche Centre Hong Kong	Porsche 911 GT3 R	92	(Hong Kong) Antares Au	A6	1
Team Porsche Centre Hong Kong	Porsche 911 GT3 R	92	(Hong Kong) Jonathan Hui	A6	1
Team Porsche Centre Hong Kong	Porsche 911 GT3 R	92	(Macau) Kevin Tse	A6	1
Team Porsche Centre Hong Kong	Porsche 911 GT3 R	92	(Hong Kong) Frank Yu	A6	1
SP4
Team	Car	No.	Drivers	Rounds	
(Germany) Mercedes-AMG Team Driving Academy	Mercedes-AMG GT R GT3	500	(Netherlands) Rik Breukers	5	
(Germany) Mercedes-AMG Team Driving Academy	Mercedes-AMG GT R GT3	500	(Germany) Maximilian Buhk	5	
(Germany) Mercedes-AMG Team Driving Academy	Mercedes-AMG GT R GT3	500	(Germany) Hubert Haupt	5	
(Germany) Mercedes-AMG Team Driving Academy	Mercedes-AMG GT R GT3	500	(Germany) Kenneth Heyer	5	
(Germany) Mercedes-AMG Team Driving Academy	Mercedes-AMG GT R GT3	500	(United States) Charles Putman	5	
(France) Nordschleife Racing	Ligier JS2 R	526	(France) Sebastien Dussolliet	6	
(France) Nordschleife Racing	Ligier JS2 R	526	(France) Sebastien Poisson	6	
(France) Nordschleife Racing	Ligier JS2 R	526	(France) Guillaume Roman	6	
(France) Nordschleife Racing	Ligier JS2 R	526	(France) Mathieu Sentis	6	
SPX
Team	Car	No.	Drivers	Rounds	
(Netherlands) JR Motorsport	BMW M3 F80	202	(Netherlands) Ted van Vliet	2–3	
(Netherlands) JR Motorsport	BMW M3 F80	202	(Netherlands) Ruud Olij	2	
(Netherlands) JR Motorsport	BMW M3 F80	202	(Belgium) Ward Sluys	3	
(Netherlands) JR Motorsport	BMW M3 F80	202	(Netherlands) Michael Verhagen	3	
(Austria) True-Racing	KTM GTX	216	(Austria) Laura Kraihamer	6	
(Austria) True-Racing	KTM GTX	216	(Austria) Sehdi Sarmini	6	
(Austria) True-Racing	KTM GTX	216	(Austria) Ferdinand Stuck	6	
(Austria) True-Racing	KTM GTX	216	(Austria) Johannes Stuck	6	
(Austria) True-Racing	KTM GTX	217	(Austria) Klaus Angerhofer	6	
(Austria) True-Racing	KTM GTX	217	(Austria) Gerald Kiska	6	
(Austria) True-Racing	KTM GTX	217	(Austria) Hubert Trunkenpolz	6	
(Austria) True-Racing	KTM GTX	217	(Poland) Artur Chwist	6	
(Austria) True-Racing	KTM GTX	217	(Austria) Sehdi Sarmini	6	
(Austria) True-Racing	KTM X-Bow	217	(Austria) Klaus Angerhofer	2	
(Austria) True-Racing	KTM X-Bow	217	(Austria) Gerald Kiska	2	
(Austria) True-Racing	KTM X-Bow	217	(Austria) Hubert Trunkenpolz	2	
(Austria) True-Racing	KTM X-Bow	217	(Greece) "Takis"	2	
(Germany) Reiter Engineering	KTM X-Bow GT4 (SP2)	246	(Poland) Adam Galas	1–2	
(Germany) Reiter Engineering	KTM X-Bow GT4 (SP2)	246	(Czech Republic) Jan Krabec	1–2	
(Germany) Reiter Engineering	KTM X-Bow GT4 (SP2)	246	(United States) Nicolai Elghanayan	1	
(Germany) Reiter Engineering	KTM X-Bow GT4 (SP2)	246	(Germany) Benjamin Mazatis	1	
(Germany) Reiter Engineering	KTM X-Bow GT4 (SP2)	246	(Austria) Sehdi Sarmini	2	
(Australia) Exedra Motorsport–Reiter	KTM X-Bow GT4 (SP2)	247	(Switzerland) Mathias Beche	1	
(Australia) Exedra Motorsport–Reiter	KTM X-Bow GT4 (SP2)	247	(Australia) Dean Koutsoumidis	1	
(Australia) Exedra Motorsport–Reiter	KTM X-Bow GT4 (SP2)	247	(Australia) James Winslow	1	
(Australia) Exedra Motorsport–Reiter	KTM X-Bow GT4 (SP2)	247	(Australia) Glen Wood	1	
(Belgium) QSR Racingschool	Mercedes-AMG GT4	454	(United States) Dominique Bastien	5	
(Belgium) QSR Racingschool	Mercedes-AMG GT4	454	(United States) Lance Bergstein	5	
(Belgium) QSR Racingschool	Mercedes-AMG GT4	454	(Belgium) Jimmy de Breucker	5	
(Belgium) QSR Racingschool	Mercedes-AMG GT4	454	(Belgium) Johnny de Breucker	5	
(Belgium) QSR Racingschool	Mercedes-AMG GT4	454	(Germany) Thomas Jäger	5	
(Germany) Black Falcon Team Textar	Mercedes-AMG GT4	464	(Germany) Alex Böhm	7	
(Germany) Black Falcon Team Textar	Mercedes-AMG GT4	464	(Germany) Axel König	7	
(Germany) Black Falcon Team Textar	Mercedes-AMG GT4	464	(Germany) Norbert Schneider	7	
(Germany) Black Falcon Team Textar	Mercedes-AMG GT4	464	(Germany) Axel Sartingen	7	
(Germany) Black Falcon Team Textar	Mercedes-AMG GT4	464	(Germany) Daniel Schwerfeld	7	
(France) Vortex V8	Vortex 1.0	701	(France) Arnaud Gomez	1	
(France) Vortex V8	Vortex 1.0	701	(France) Olivier Gomez	1	
(France) Vortex V8	Vortex 1.0	701	(France) Alban Varutti	1	
(France) Vortex V8	Vortex 1.0	701	(France) Stephane Cottrell	6	
(France) Vortex V8	Vortex 1.0	701	(France) Philippe Gruau	6	
(France) Vortex V8	Vortex 1.0	701	(Spain) Francesc Gutierrez Agüi	6	
(France) Vortex V8	Vortex 1.0	701	(Switzerland) Nicolas Nobs	6	
(Belgium) Vr Racing by Qvick Motors	MARC II V8	709	(Belgium) Erik Qvick	3	
(Belgium) Vr Racing by Qvick Motors	MARC II V8	709	(Belgium) John Rasse	3	
(Belgium) Vr Racing by Qvick Motors	MARC II V8	709	(Belgium) Tom van Rompuy	3	
(Germany) Leipert Motorsport	Lamborghini Huracán Super Trofeo EVO	710	(Kuwait) Khaled Al Mudhaf	1	
(Germany) Leipert Motorsport	Lamborghini Huracán Super Trofeo EVO	710	(Norway) Marcus Påverud	1	
(Germany) Leipert Motorsport	Lamborghini Huracán Super Trofeo EVO	710	(United Kingdom) Jake Rattenbury	1	
(Germany) Leipert Motorsport	Lamborghini Huracán Super Trofeo EVO	710	(Denmark) Frederik Schandorff	1	
(Germany) Leipert Motorsport	Lamborghini Huracán Super Trofeo EVO	710	(Germany) Harald Schlotter	1, 7	
(Germany) Leipert Motorsport	Lamborghini Huracán Super Trofeo EVO	710	(Norway) Aleksander Schjerpen	7	
(Germany) Leipert Motorsport	Lamborghini Huracán Super Trofeo EVO	710	(Russia) Alexey Karachev	7	
(Germany) Leipert Motorsport	Lamborghini Huracán Super Trofeo EVO	710	(Russia) Denis Soglaev	7	
(Germany) Leipert Motorsport	Lamborghini Huracán Super Trofeo EVO	710	(United States) Gregg Gorski	7	
(Germany) Leipert Motorsport	Mercedes-AMG GT4	710	(Austria) Dominik Baumann	5	
(Germany) Leipert Motorsport	Mercedes-AMG GT4	710	(Finland) Ilmari Korpivaara	5	
(Germany) Leipert Motorsport	Mercedes-AMG GT4	710	(Norway) Marcus Påverud	5	
(Germany) Leipert Motorsport	Mercedes-AMG GT4	710	(Germany) Harald Schlotter	5	
(Germany) Leipert Motorsport	Mercedes-AMG GT4	710	(Luxembourg) Yury Wagner	5	
(Netherlands) Cor Euser Racing	BMW M3 1 MARC II V8 2	717	(Netherlands) Cor Euser	1, 3, 5–7	
(Netherlands) Cor Euser Racing	BMW M3 1 MARC II V8 2	717	(Norway) Einar Thorsen	1, 3, 5–7	
(Netherlands) Cor Euser Racing	BMW M3 1 MARC II V8 2	717	(United Kingdom) Sam Allpass	1, 7	
(Netherlands) Cor Euser Racing	BMW M3 1 MARC II V8 2	717	(Netherlands) Dennis Houweling	1	
(Netherlands) Cor Euser Racing	BMW M3 1 MARC II V8 2	717	(Germany) Der Bommel	1	
(Netherlands) Cor Euser Racing	BMW M3 1 MARC II V8 2	717	(United States) Jim Briody	5–7	
(Netherlands) Cor Euser Racing	BMW M3 1 MARC II V8 2	717	(United Kingdom) Ricky Coomber	5–6	
(Netherlands) Cor Euser Racing	BMW M3 1 MARC II V8 2	717	(Australia) Ryan McLeod	6	
(Netherlands) Cor Euser Racing	BMW M3 1 MARC II V8 2	717	(Belgium) Ward Sluys	7	
(Belgium) VDS Racing Adventures	MARC II V8	758	(Belgium) José Close	1	
(Belgium) VDS Racing Adventures	MARC II V8	758	(Germany) Wolfgang Haugg	1	
(Belgium) VDS Racing Adventures	MARC II V8	758	(Luxembourg) Hary Putz	1	
(Belgium) VDS Racing Adventures	MARC II V8	758	(Belgium) Raphaël van der Straten	1	
(Belgium) VDS Racing Adventures	MARC II V8	758	(Belgium) Joel Vanloocke	1	
(Germany) Team Clickvers.de	Porsche 991 GT3 Cup MR	769	(Germany) Stefan Berger	6	
(Germany) Team Clickvers.de	Porsche 991 GT3 Cup MR	769	(Germany) Robin Chrzanowski	6	
(Germany) Team Clickvers.de	Porsche 991 GT3 Cup MR	769	(Germany) Kersten Jodexnis	6	
(Germany) Team Clickvers.de	Porsche 991 GT3 Cup MR	769	(Germany) Maximilian Koch	6	
(Belgium) Speed Lover	Porsche 991 GT3 Cup MR	778	(United States) Dominique Bastien	1	
(Belgium) Speed Lover	Porsche 991 GT3 Cup MR	778	(Hong Kong) Nigel Farmer	1	
(Belgium) Speed Lover	Porsche 991 GT3 Cup MR	778	(Belgium) Jean-Michel Gerome	1	
(Belgium) Speed Lover	Porsche 991 GT3 Cup MR	778	(France) Gilles Petit	1	
(Germany) MRS GT-Racing	Porsche 991 GT3 Cup MR	990	(Brazil) Dennis Dirani	1	
(Germany) MRS GT-Racing	Porsche 991 GT3 Cup MR	990	(Brazil) Ricardo Mauricio	1	
(Germany) MRS GT-Racing	Porsche 991 GT3 Cup MR	990	(Brazil) Werner Neugebauer	1	
(Germany) MRS GT-Racing	Porsche 991 GT3 Cup MR	990	(Brazil) Daniel Schneider	1	
991
Team	Car	No.	Drivers	Rounds	
(Germany) Team Webheads	Porsche 991 GT3 Cup	902	(Germany) Joachim Bölting	6	
(Germany) Team Webheads	Porsche 991 GT3 Cup	902	(France) Tom Dillmann	6	
(Germany) Team Webheads	Porsche 991 GT3 Cup	902	(United Kingdom) JM Littman	6	
(Germany) Team Webheads	Porsche 991 GT3 Cup	902	(Germany) Andreas Riedl	6	
(Germany) Teichmann Racing	Porsche 991 GT3 Cup	903	(Sweden) Tommy Gråberg	2–3	
(Germany) Teichmann Racing	Porsche 991 GT3 Cup	903	(Sweden) Hans Holmlund	2–3	
(Germany) Teichmann Racing	Porsche 991 GT3 Cup	903	(United Kingdom) Scott Marshall	2–3	
(United States) Kelly-Moss Road and Race	Porsche 991 GT3 Cup	906	(United States) Alan Metni	7	
(United States) Kelly-Moss Road and Race	Porsche 991 GT3 Cup	906	(United States) Wayne Ducote	7	
(United States) Kelly-Moss Road and Race	Porsche 991 GT3 Cup	906	(United States) David Ducote	7	
(United States) Kelly-Moss Road and Race	Porsche 991 GT3 Cup	906	(United States) Chapman Ducote	7	
(United States) Kelly-Moss Road and Race	Porsche 991 GT3 Cup	906	(United States) Andrew Davis	7	
(United States) Kelly-Moss Road and Race	Porsche 991 GT3 Cup	910	(United States) Alan Metni	7	
(United States) Kelly-Moss Road and Race	Porsche 991 GT3 Cup	910	(United States) Wayne Ducote	7	
(United States) Kelly-Moss Road and Race	Porsche 991 GT3 Cup	910	(United States) David Ducote	7	
(United States) Kelly-Moss Road and Race	Porsche 991 GT3 Cup	910	(United States) Chapman Ducote	7	
(United States) Kelly-Moss Road and Race	Porsche 991 GT3 Cup	910	(United States) Andrew Davis	7	
(Luxembourg) DUWO Racing	Porsche 991 GT3 Cup	909	(Russia) Andrey Mukovoz	2–5	
(Luxembourg) DUWO Racing	Porsche 991 GT3 Cup	909	(Russia) Sergey Peregudov	2–5	
(Luxembourg) DUWO Racing	Porsche 991 GT3 Cup	909	(Russia) Stanislav Sidoruk	2–5	
(France) Porsche Lorient Racing	Porsche 991 GT3 Cup	911	(France) Frédéric Ancel	All	
(France) Porsche Lorient Racing	Porsche 991 GT3 Cup	911	(France) Lionel Amrouche	1–2, 4–5	
(France) Porsche Lorient Racing	Porsche 991 GT3 Cup	911	(France) Pascal Gibon	1, 6	
(France) Porsche Lorient Racing	Porsche 991 GT3 Cup	911	(France) Gilles Blasco	2–5	
(France) Porsche Lorient Racing	Porsche 991 GT3 Cup	911	(France) Jean-François Demorge	2–7	
(France) Porsche Lorient Racing	Porsche 991 GT3 Cup	911	(France) Mathieu Pontais	3, 6	
(France) Porsche Lorient Racing	Porsche 991 GT3 Cup	911	(United Kingdom) Gavin Pickering	5	
(France) Porsche Lorient Racing	Porsche 991 GT3 Cup	911	(France) Eric Mouez	7	
(France) Porsche Lorient Racing	Porsche 991 GT3 Cup	911	(United States) Dominique Bastien	7	
(France) Porsche Lorient Racing	Porsche 991 GT3 Cup	912	(France) Cyril Calmon	1	
(France) Porsche Lorient Racing	Porsche 991 GT3 Cup	912	(France) Eric Mouez	1	
(France) Porsche Lorient Racing	Porsche 991 GT3 Cup	912	(France) Mathieu Pontais	1, 4	
(France) Porsche Lorient Racing	Porsche 991 GT3 Cup	912	(France) Remi Terrail	1	
(France) Porsche Lorient Racing	Porsche 991 GT3 Cup	912	(France) Frederic Lelievre	2–4	
(France) Porsche Lorient Racing	Porsche 991 GT3 Cup	912	(France) Philippe Polette	2–4	
(France) Porsche Lorient Racing	Porsche 991 GT3 Cup	912	(France) Pascal Gibon	2, 4	
(France) Porsche Lorient Racing	Porsche 991 GT3 Cup	912	(France) Jean-Philippe Belloc	2	
(France) Porsche Lorient Racing	Porsche 991 GT3 Cup	912	(France) Lionel Amrouche	3, 6	
(France) Porsche Lorient Racing	Porsche 991 GT3 Cup	912	(France) Antoine Ettienne	6	
(France) Porsche Lorient Racing	Porsche 991 GT3 Cup	912	(France) Ludovic Loeul	6	
(France) Porsche Lorient Racing	Porsche 991 GT3 Cup	912	(France) Hervé Tremblaye	6	
(Germany) race:pro motorsport (Note: Car No. 916 was entered as race:pro motorsport at Round 1 and as Modena Motorsports at Round 3) (Hong Kong) Modena Motorsports	Porsche 991 GT3 Cup	916	(France) Philippe Descombes	1, 3	
(Germany) race:pro motorsport (Hong Kong) Modena Motorsports	Porsche 991 GT3 Cup	916	(Canada) John Shen	1, 3	
(Germany) race:pro motorsport (Hong Kong) Modena Motorsports	Porsche 991 GT3 Cup	916	(Denmark) Benny Simonsen	1, 3	
(Germany) race:pro motorsport (Hong Kong) Modena Motorsports	Porsche 991 GT3 Cup	916	(Germany) Bertram Hornung	1	
(Germany) race:pro motorsport (Hong Kong) Modena Motorsports	Porsche 991 GT3 Cup	916	(Netherlands) Francis Tjia	3	
(Switzerland) Orchid Racing Team	Porsche 991 GT3 Cup	917	(Switzerland) Richard Feller	6	
(Switzerland) Orchid Racing Team	Porsche 991 GT3 Cup	917	(Switzerland) Manuel Nicolaidis	6	
(Switzerland) Orchid Racing Team	Porsche 991 GT3 Cup	917	(Switzerland) Leonard Rendulic	6	
(Switzerland) Orchid Racing Team	Porsche 991 GT3 Cup	917	(Switzerland) Fabio Spirgi	6	
(France) B2F compétition	Porsche 991 GT3 Cup	935	(France) Benoit Fretin	3	
(France) B2F compétition	Porsche 991 GT3 Cup	935	(France) Bruno Fretin	3	
(United Kingdom) Duel Racing	Porsche 991 GT3 Cup	950	(Republic of Ireland) Charlie Eastwood	1	
(United Kingdom) Duel Racing	Porsche 991 GT3 Cup	950	(Lebanon) Nabil Moutran	1	
(United Kingdom) Duel Racing	Porsche 991 GT3 Cup	950	(Lebanon) Ramzi Moutran	1	
(United Kingdom) Duel Racing	Porsche 991 GT3 Cup	950	(Lebanon) Sami Moutran	1	
(Russia) Vintic&Shpuntic by HRT	Porsche 991 GT3 Cup	968	(Russia) Stepan Krumilov	1	
(Russia) Vintic&Shpuntic by HRT	Porsche 991 GT3 Cup	968	(Russia) Andrey Mukovoz	1	
(Russia) Vintic&Shpuntic by HRT	Porsche 991 GT3 Cup	968	(Russia) Sergey Peregudov	1	
(Russia) Vintic&Shpuntic by HRT	Porsche 991 GT3 Cup	968	(Russia) Stanislav Sidoruk	1	
(Germany) MSG HRT Motorsport	Porsche 991 GT3 Cup	969	(Germany) Stefan Aust	1	
(Germany) MSG HRT Motorsport	Porsche 991 GT3 Cup	969	(Germany) Holger Harmsen	1	
(Germany) MSG HRT Motorsport	Porsche 991 GT3 Cup	969	(Russia) Anton Lyubchenkov	1	
(Germany) MSG HRT Motorsport	Porsche 991 GT3 Cup	969	(Switzerland) Lucas Mauron	1	
(Belgium) Speed Lover	Porsche 991 GT3 Cup	978	(United States) Dominique Bastien	3–4, 6	
(Belgium) Speed Lover	Porsche 991 GT3 Cup	978	(Belgium) Sven Van Laere	3	
(Belgium) Speed Lover	Porsche 991 GT3 Cup	978	(Belgium) Wim Meulders	4	
(Belgium) Speed Lover	Porsche 991 GT3 Cup	978	(Hong Kong) Nigel Farmer	6-7	
(Belgium) Speed Lover	Porsche 991 GT3 Cup	978	(Netherlands) Richard Verburg	6-7	
(Belgium) Speed Lover	Porsche 991 GT3 Cup	978	(Malaysia) Keong Liam Lim	6	
(Belgium) Speed Lover	Porsche 991 GT3 Cup	978	(Singapore) Gerald Tan	7	
(Belgium) Speed Lover	Porsche 991 GT3 Cup	978	(Belgium) Pierre-Yves Paque	7	
(Germany) MRS GT-Racing	Porsche 991 GT3 Cup	979	(France) Olivier Baharian	1	
(Germany) MRS GT-Racing	Porsche 991 GT3 Cup	979	(France) Thierry Blaise	1	
(Germany) MRS GT-Racing	Porsche 991 GT3 Cup	979	(Denmark) Michael Markussen	1	
(Germany) MRS GT-Racing	Porsche 991 GT3 Cup	979	(Switzerland) Manuel Nicolaidis	1	
(Germany) MRS GT-Racing	Porsche 991 GT3 Cup	980	(Austria) Helmut Rödig	1–2	
(Germany) MRS GT-Racing	Porsche 991 GT3 Cup	980	(Germany) Wolfgang Triller	1, 3	
(Germany) MRS GT-Racing	Porsche 991 GT3 Cup	980	(Japan) Yutaka Matsushima	1	
(Germany) MRS GT-Racing	Porsche 991 GT3 Cup	980	(Poland) Gosia Rdest	1	
(Germany) MRS GT-Racing	Porsche 991 GT3 Cup	980	(Austria) Christopher Zöchling	1	
(Germany) MRS GT-Racing	Porsche 991 GT3 Cup	980	(Germany) Peter Terting	2–3	
(Germany) MRS GT-Racing	Porsche 991 GT3 Cup	980	(Italy) Nicola Michelon	2, 5, 7	
(Germany) MRS GT-Racing	Porsche 991 GT3 Cup	980	(Argentina) Pablo Otero	3	
(Germany) MRS GT-Racing	Porsche 991 GT3 Cup	980	(Germany) Alex Autumn	5–6	
(Germany) MRS GT-Racing	Porsche 991 GT3 Cup	980	(Germany) Hendrik von Dannwitz	5–6	
(Germany) MRS GT-Racing	Porsche 991 GT3 Cup	980	(Argentina) Dorian Mansilla	5	
(Germany) MRS GT-Racing	Porsche 991 GT3 Cup	980	(Germany) Andreas Gülden	6	
(Germany) MRS GT-Racing	Porsche 991 GT3 Cup	980	(Finland) Jukka Honkavuori	6	
(Germany) MRS GT-Racing	Porsche 991 GT3 Cup	980	(Brazil) Raulino Kreis Jr	6	
(Germany) MRS GT-Racing	Porsche 991 GT3 Cup	980	(United States) Alexander Marmureanu	7	
(Germany) MRS GT-Racing	Porsche 991 GT3 Cup	980	(United States) David Roberts	7	
(Germany) MRS GT-Racing	Porsche 991 GT3 Cup	980	(United Kingdom) JM Littman	7	
(Germany) MRS GT-Racing	Porsche 991 GT3 Cup	980	(Austria) Constantin Schöll	7	
(Germany) MRS GT-Racing	Porsche 991 GT3 Cup	989	(Japan) Kenji Abe	1	
(Germany) MRS GT-Racing	Porsche 991 GT3 Cup	989	(Japan) Tamotsu Kondo	1	
(Germany) MRS GT-Racing	Porsche 991 GT3 Cup	989	(Japan) Motoharu Sato	1	
(Germany) MRS GT-Racing	Porsche 991 GT3 Cup	989	(China) Xu Wei	1	
(Germany) MRS GT-Racing	Porsche 991 GT3 Cup	989	(Japan) Naoki Yokomizo	1	
(Germany) Raceunion	Porsche 991 GT3 Cup	987	(Germany) Alex Autumn	2	
(Germany) Raceunion	Porsche 991 GT3 Cup	987	(Germany) Felipe Fernández Laser	2	
(Germany) Raceunion	Porsche 991 GT3 Cup	987	(Germany) Andreas Gülden	2	
(Netherlands) NKPP Racing by Bas Koeten Racing	Porsche 991 GT3 Cup	991	(Netherlands) Gijs Bessem	1–2	
(Netherlands) NKPP Racing by Bas Koeten Racing	Porsche 991 GT3 Cup	991	(Netherlands) Harry Hilders	1–2	
(Netherlands) NKPP Racing by Bas Koeten Racing	Porsche 991 GT3 Cup	991	(Netherlands) Bob Herber	1	
(Netherlands) NKPP Racing by Bas Koeten Racing	Porsche 991 GT3 Cup	991	(Netherlands) Roeland Voerman	1	
(Netherlands) PGmotorsport.nl	Porsche 991 GT3 Cup	992	(Netherlands) Thijs Heezen	3	
(Netherlands) PGmotorsport.nl	Porsche 991 GT3 Cup	992	(Netherlands) Jos Menten	3	
(United Kingdom) track-club	Porsche 991 GT3 Cup	999	(United Kingdom) Adam Balon	1	
(United Kingdom) track-club	Porsche 991 GT3 Cup	999	(United Kingdom) Marcus Jewell	1	
(United Kingdom) track-club	Porsche 991 GT3 Cup	999	(United Kingdom) Adam Knight	1	
(United Kingdom) track-club	Porsche 991 GT3 Cup	999	(United Kingdom) Ian Loggie	1	
SP2
Team	Car	No.	Drivers	Rounds	
(Netherlands) JR Motorsport	BMW M4 GT Silhouette	203	(Belgium) Ward Sluys	2	
(Netherlands) JR Motorsport	BMW M4 GT Silhouette	203	(Netherlands) Michael Verhagen	2	
(Netherlands) JR Motorsport	BMW M4 GT Silhouette	203	(Netherlands) Max Weering	2	
(Czech Republic) RTR Projects	KTM X-Bow GT4 (SP2)	224	(Czech Republic) Karel Bednar	2	
(Czech Republic) RTR Projects	KTM X-Bow GT4 (SP2)	224	(Czech Republic) Erik Janiš	2	
(Czech Republic) RTR Projects	KTM X-Bow GT4 (SP2)	224	(Czech Republic) Tomas Miniberger	2	
(Czech Republic) RTR Projects	KTM X-Bow GT4 (SP2)	224	(Czech Republic) Sergej Pavlovec	2	
GT4
Team	Car	No.	Drivers	Rounds	
(Germany) PROsport Performance AMR	Aston Martin Vantage AMR GT4	1	(Belgium) Rodrigue Gillion	2, 4–6	
(Germany) PROsport Performance AMR	Aston Martin Vantage AMR GT4	1	(Belgium) Nico Verdonck	2, 4–6	
(Germany) PROsport Performance AMR	Aston Martin Vantage AMR GT4	1	(India) Akhil Rabindra	2, 4–5	
(Germany) PROsport Performance AMR	Aston Martin Vantage AMR GT4	1	(Germany) Mike-David Ortmann	5	
(Germany) PROsport Performance AMR	Aston Martin Vantage AMR GT4	1	(Spain) Jon Aizpurua	6	
(Germany) PROsport Performance AMR	Aston Martin Vantage AMR GT4	1	(United States) Nicholas Silva	6	
(Switzerland) Hofor Racing powered by Bonk Motorsport	BMW M4 GT4	50	(Austria) Michael Fischer	1–2, 4–6	
(Switzerland) Hofor Racing powered by Bonk Motorsport	BMW M4 GT4	50	(Switzerland) Martin Kroll	1–2, 4–6	
(Switzerland) Hofor Racing powered by Bonk Motorsport	BMW M4 GT4	50	(Austria) Gustav Engljähringer	1–2, 4	
(Switzerland) Hofor Racing powered by Bonk Motorsport	BMW M4 GT4	50	(Germany) Michael Schrey	1–2, 5–6	
(Switzerland) Hofor Racing powered by Bonk Motorsport	BMW M4 GT4	50	(Netherlands) Liesette Braams	1	
(Switzerland) Hofor Racing powered by Bonk Motorsport	BMW M4 GT4	50	(Austria) Thomas Jäger	2, 4–6	
(Switzerland) Hofor Racing powered by Bonk Motorsport	BMW M4 GT4	50	(Germany) Michael Bonk	4, 6	
(Switzerland) Hofor Racing powered by Bonk Motorsport	BMW M4 GT4	50	(Germany) Alexander Prinz	5	
(Czech Republic) RTR Projects	KTM X-Bow GT4	224	(Austria) Eike Angermayr	4	
(Czech Republic) RTR Projects	KTM X-Bow GT4	224	(Czech Republic) Tomáš Enge	4	
(Czech Republic) RTR Projects	KTM X-Bow GT4	224	(Czech Republic) Jan Krabec	4	
(Czech Republic) RTR Projects	KTM X-Bow GT4	224	(Czech Republic) Sergej Pavlovec	4	
(Czech Republic) RTR Projects	KTM X-Bow GT4	226	(Czech Republic) Karel Bednar	4	
(Czech Republic) RTR Projects	KTM X-Bow GT4	226	(Czech Republic) Gabriela Jílková	4	
(Czech Republic) RTR Projects	KTM X-Bow GT4	226	(Czech Republic) Milan Kodidek	4	
(Czech Republic) RTR Projects	KTM X-Bow GT4	226	(Czech Republic) Tomas Kwolek	4	
(Czech Republic) RTR Projects	KTM X-Bow GT4	226	(Czech Republic) Tomas Miniberger	4	
(Canada) ST Racing	BMW M4 GT4	388	(Canada) Samantha Tan	7	
(Canada) ST Racing	BMW M4 GT4	388	(United States) John Boyd	7	
(Canada) ST Racing	BMW M4 GT4	388	(United States) Harry Gottsacker	7	
(Canada) ST Racing	BMW M4 GT4	388	(United States) Anthony Lazzaro	7	
(Canada) ST Racing	BMW M4 GT4	388	(United States) Jason Wolfe	7	
(United States) Racers Edge Motorsports	SIN R1	401	(United States) Ross Smith	7	
(United States) Racers Edge Motorsports	SIN R1	401	(United States) Jade Buford	7	
(United States) Racers Edge Motorsports	SIN R1	401	(Canada) Marco Di Leo	7	
(United States) Racers Edge Motorsports	SIN R1	401	(Canada) Dan Di Leo	7	
(United Kingdom) ERC SPORT	Mercedes-AMG GT4	405	(Slovakia) Katarina Kyvalova	1	
(United Kingdom) ERC SPORT	Mercedes-AMG GT4	405	(United Kingdom) Jon Minshaw	1	
(United Kingdom) ERC SPORT	Mercedes-AMG GT4	405	(Italy) Gabriele Piana	1	
(United Kingdom) ERC SPORT	Mercedes-AMG GT4	405	(United Kingdom) Ryan Ratcliffe	1	
(Italy) Scuderia Villorba Corse	Mercedes-AMG GT4	406	(Switzerland) Mauro Calamia	2	
(Italy) Scuderia Villorba Corse	Mercedes-AMG GT4	406	(Switzerland) Stefano Monaco	2	
(Italy) Scuderia Villorba Corse	Mercedes-AMG GT4	406	(Italy) Amedeo Pampanini	2	
(Italy) Scuderia Villorba Corse	Mercedes-AMG GT4	406	(Italy) Roberto Pampanini	2	
(Czech Republic) Senkyr Motorsport	BMW M4 GT4	409	(Slovakia) Tomas Erdelyi	4	
(Czech Republic) Senkyr Motorsport	BMW M4 GT4	409	(Czech Republic) Marek Fried	4	
(Czech Republic) Senkyr Motorsport	BMW M4 GT4	409	(Slovakia) Richard Gonda	4	
(Czech Republic) Senkyr Motorsport	BMW M4 GT4	409	(Czech Republic) Robert Senkyr	4	
(United States) RHC Jorgensen/Strom	BMW M4 GT4	411	(United States) Jon Miller	7	
(United States) RHC Jorgensen/Strom	BMW M4 GT4	411	(United States) Daren Jorgensen	7	
(United States) RHC Jorgensen/Strom	BMW M4 GT4	411	(United States) Brett Strom	7	
(United States) RHC Jorgensen/Strom	BMW M4 GT4	411	(Netherlands) Danny van Dongen	7	
(United States) RHC Jorgensen/Strom	BMW M4 GT4	450	(United States) Jon Miller	7	
(United States) RHC Jorgensen/Strom	BMW M4 GT4	450	(United States) Daren Jorgensen	7	
(United States) RHC Jorgensen/Strom	BMW M4 GT4	450	(United States) Brett Strom	7	
(United States) RHC Jorgensen/Strom	BMW M4 GT4	450	(Netherlands) Danny van Dongen	7	
(Portugal) Parkalgar Racing Team	Mercedes-AMG GT4	412	(Portugal) José Monroy	5	
(Portugal) Parkalgar Racing Team	Mercedes-AMG GT4	412	(Brazil) Joaquim Penteado	5	
(Portugal) Parkalgar Racing Team	Mercedes-AMG GT4	412	(Portugal) Paulo Pinheiro	5	
(Portugal) Parkalgar Racing Team	Mercedes-AMG GT4	412	(Australia) Malcolm Sandford	5	
(Switzerland) Orchid Racing Team	Porsche 718 Cayman GT4 CS MR	415	(Switzerland) Emmanuel Bello	6	
(Switzerland) Orchid Racing Team	Porsche 718 Cayman GT4 CS MR	415	(France) Laurent Misbach	6	
(Switzerland) Orchid Racing Team	Porsche 718 Cayman GT4 CS MR	415	(Switzerland) Alexandre Mottet	6	
(Switzerland) Orchid Racing Team	Porsche 718 Cayman GT4 CS MR	415	(Switzerland) Massimo Salamanca	6	
(Spain) Team Virage	Aston Martin Vantage AMR GT4	417	(United Kingdom) CO. Jones	5	
(Spain) Team Virage	Aston Martin Vantage AMR GT4	417	(Portugal) Pedro Lamy	5	
(Spain) Team Virage	Aston Martin Vantage AMR GT4	417	(Estonia) Thomas Padovani	5	
(Spain) Team Virage	Aston Martin Vantage AMR GT4	417	(Portugal) Peter Peters	5	
(Germany) MRS GT-Racing	BMW M4 GT4	426	(Croatia) Franjo Kovac	1–2	
(Germany) MRS GT-Racing	BMW M4 GT4	426	(Czech Republic) Tomas Pekar	1–2	
(Germany) MRS GT-Racing	BMW M4 GT4	426	(Germany) Thomas Tekaat	1–2	
(Germany) MRS GT-Racing	BMW M4 GT4	426	(Sweden) Fredrik Lestrup	1	
(United Kingdom) Century Motorsport	BMW M4 GT4	429	(United Kingdom) Thomas Canning	1	
(United Kingdom) Century Motorsport	BMW M4 GT4	429	(United Kingdom) Andrew Gordon-Colebrooke	1	
(United Kingdom) Century Motorsport	BMW M4 GT4	429	(United Kingdom) Nathan Freke	1	
(United Kingdom) Century Motorsport	BMW M4 GT4	429	(United Kingdom) JM Littman	1	
(United Kingdom) Century Motorsport	BMW M4 GT4	430	(United Kingdom) Mark Farmer	1	
(United Kingdom) Century Motorsport	BMW M4 GT4	430	(United Kingdom) Jack Mitchell	1	
(United Kingdom) Century Motorsport	BMW M4 GT4	430	(United Kingdom) Dominic Paul	1	
(United Kingdom) Century Motorsport	BMW M4 GT4	430	(United Kingdom) Adrian Willmott	1	
(United Kingdom) Optimum Motorsport	Ginetta G55 GT4	432	(United Kingdom) Jack Butel	1	
(United Kingdom) Optimum Motorsport	Ginetta G55 GT4	432	(United Kingdom) Brent Millage	1	
(United Kingdom) Optimum Motorsport	Ginetta G55 GT4	432	(United Kingdom) Russ Olivant	1	
(United Kingdom) Optimum Motorsport	Ginetta G55 GT4	432	(United Kingdom) Lewis Proctor	1	
(United States) Winward Racing	Mercedes-AMG GT4	433	(United States) Bryce Ward	7	
(United States) Winward Racing	Mercedes-AMG GT4	433	(United States) Russell Ward	7	
(United States) Winward Racing	Mercedes-AMG GT4	433	(United States) Kris Wilson	7	
(United States) Winward Racing	Mercedes-AMG GT4	433	(United Kingdom) Philip Ellis	7	
(United Kingdom) Fox Motorsport	Audi R8 LMS GT4	447	(United Kingdom) Ben Clucas	1	
(United Kingdom) Fox Motorsport	Audi R8 LMS GT4	447	(United Kingdom) Andrew Perry	1	
(United Kingdom) Fox Motorsport	Audi R8 LMS GT4	447	(United Kingdom) Glenn Sherwood	1	
(United Kingdom) Fox Motorsport	Audi R8 LMS GT4	447	(United Kingdom) Jamie Stanley	1	
(United States) RHC-Lawrence/Storm	BMW M4 GT4	450	(United States) Daren Jorgensen	1	
(United States) RHC-Lawrence/Storm	BMW M4 GT4	450	(Australia) Gerard McLeod	1	
(United States) RHC-Lawrence/Storm	BMW M4 GT4	450	(United States) Brett Strom	1	
(United States) RHC-Lawrence/Storm	BMW M4 GT4	450	(Netherlands) Danny van Dongen	1	
(Germany) Sorg Rennsport	BMW M4 GT4	451	(Germany) Olaf Meyer	1, 6-7	
(Germany) Sorg Rennsport	BMW M4 GT4	451	(Germany) Björn Simon	1, 6-7	
(Germany) Sorg Rennsport	BMW M4 GT4	451	(United States) Simon Tibbett	1, 6-7	
(Germany) Sorg Rennsport	BMW M4 GT4	451	(Germany) Stephan Epp	1, 6	
(Germany) Sorg Rennsport	BMW M4 GT4	451	(Germany) Fidel Leib	1	
(Germany) Sorg Rennsport	BMW M4 GT4	451	(Germany) Torsten Kratz	6	
(Germany) Sorg Rennsport	BMW M4 GT4	451	(United States) Jason Hart	7	
(Germany) Sorg Rennsport	BMW M4 GT4	451	(United States) Matt Travis	7	
(Belgium) QSR Racingschool	Mercedes-AMG GT4	454	(Belgium) Jimmy de Breucker	1, 4	
(Belgium) QSR Racingschool	Mercedes-AMG GT4	454	(Belgium) Rodrigue Gillion	1	
(Belgium) QSR Racingschool	Mercedes-AMG GT4	454	(Belgium) Nico Verdonck	1	
(Belgium) QSR Racingschool	Mercedes-AMG GT4	454	(Belgium) Michiel Verhaeren	1, 4	
(Belgium) QSR Racingschool	Mercedes-AMG GT4	454	(United Kingdom) Ricky Coomber	4	
(Belgium) QSR Racingschool	Mercedes-AMG GT4	454	(United Kingdom) Gavin Pickering	4	
(United Kingdom) Ciceley Motorsport	Mercedes-AMG GT4	462	(United Kingdom) Frank Bird	1	
(United Kingdom) Ciceley Motorsport	Mercedes-AMG GT4	462	(United States) Ben Paliwoda	1	
(United Kingdom) Ciceley Motorsport	Mercedes-AMG GT4	462	(United Kingdom) Derek Pierce	1	
(United Kingdom) Ciceley Motorsport	Mercedes-AMG GT4	462	(United Kingdom) Jordan Witt	1	
(France) 3Y Technology	BMW M4 GT4	469	(United Arab Emirates) Ahmed Al Melaihi	1	
(France) 3Y Technology	BMW M4 GT4	469	(France) Enzo Guibbert	1	
(France) 3Y Technology	BMW M4 GT4	469	(France) Gilles Vannelet	1	
(France) 3Y Technology	BMW M4 GT4	469	(United Kingdom) Lars Viljoen	1	
(France) 3Y Technology	BMW M4 GT4	469	(United Arab Emirates) Nadir Zuhour	1	
(United Arab Emirates) Dragon Racing	Mercedes-AMG GT4	488	(United Arab Emirates) Saeed Al Mehairi	1	
(United Arab Emirates) Dragon Racing	Mercedes-AMG GT4	488	(United Kingdom) Rob Barff	1	
(United Arab Emirates) Dragon Racing	Mercedes-AMG GT4	488	(United Kingdom) Greg Caton	1	
(United Arab Emirates) Dragon Racing	Mercedes-AMG GT4	488	(United Kingdom) Phil Quaife	1	
(United Arab Emirates) Dragon Racing	Mercedes-AMG GT4	488	(United Kingdom) Josh Webster	1	

Icon	Class
A6	A6-Pro
A6	A6-Am

== Race results ==
Bold indicates overall winner.

Classes	(United Arab Emirates) 24H Dubai Round 1	(Italy) 12H Mugello Round 2	(Belgium) 12H Spa Round 3	(Czech Republic) 12H Brno Round 4	(Portugal) 24H Portimão Round 5	(Spain) 24H Barcelona Round 6	(United States) 24H COTA Round 7
A6-Pro Winners	**(Germany) No. 88 Car Collection Motorsport**	**(Czech Republic) No. 11 Bohemia Energy Racing** **with Scuderia Praha**	**(Czech Republic) No. 11 Bohemia Energy Racing** **with Scuderia Praha**	**(Czech Republic) No. 11 Bohemia Energy Racing** **with Scuderia Praha**	**(Czech Republic) No. 11 Bohemia Energy Racing** **with Scuderia Praha**	**(United Kingdom) No. 77 Barwell Motorsport**	**(Germany) No. 4 Black Falcon**
A6-Pro Winners	**(Netherlands) Rik Breukers** **(Germany) Christopher Haase** **(Germany) Dimitri Parhofer** **(Belgium) Frédéric Vervisch**	**(Czech Republic) Josef Král** **(Italy) Matteo Malucelli** **(Czech Republic) Jiří Písařík**	**(Czech Republic) Josef Král** **(Italy) Matteo Malucelli** **(Czech Republic) Jiří Písařík**	**(Czech Republic) Josef Král** **(Italy) Matteo Malucelli** **(Czech Republic) Jiří Písařík**	**(Czech Republic) Josef Král** **(Italy) Matteo Malucelli** **(Czech Republic) Jiří Písařík**	**(Switzerland) Adrian Amstutz** **(Finland) Patrick Kujala** **(Denmark) Dennis Lind** **(Russia) Leo Machitski**	**(Netherlands) Jeroen Bleekemolen** **(Brazil) Felipe Fraga** **(United States) Ben Keating** **(United States) Cooper MacNeil**
A6-Am Winners	(Germany) No. 25 Mann-Filter Team HTP Motorsport	(Switzerland) No. 10 Hofor Racing	(Germany) No. 91 Herberth Motorsport	(Germany) No. 91 Herberth Motorsport	(Germany) No. 93 Herberth Motorsport	(Germany) No. 93 Herberth Motorsport	(Germany) No. 34 Car Collection Motorsport
A6-Am Winners	(Netherlands) Indy Dontje (Austria) Alexander Hrachowina (Austria) Martin Konrad (Germany) Bernd Schneider	(Netherlands) Christiaan Frankenhout (Germany) Kenneth Heyer (Switzerland) Michael Kroll (Germany) Alexander Prinz	(Switzerland) Daniel Allemann (Germany) Ralf Bohn (Germany) Robert Renauer	(Switzerland) Daniel Allemann (Germany) Ralf Bohn (Germany) Robert Renauer	(Germany) Stefan Aust (Austria) Klaus Bachler (Germany) Edward Lewis Brauner (Germany) Klaus Rader (Germany) Hans Wehrmann	(Germany) Stefan Aust (Austria) Klaus Bachler (Germany) Edward Lewis Brauner (Germany) Vincent Kolb	(Germany) Gustav Edelhoff (Germany) Max Edelhoff (Germany) Elmar Grimm (Germany) Johannes Dr. Kirchhoff (Germany) Ingo Vogler
SPX Winners	(Germany) No. 710 Leipert Motorsport	No Entrants	(Netherlands) No. 202 JR Motorsport	No Entrants	(Germany) No. 710 Leipert Motorsport	(Austria) No. 216 True-Racing	(Germany) No. 710 Leipert Motorsport
SPX Winners	(Kuwait) Khaled Al Mudhaf (Norway) Marcus Påverud (United Kingdom) Jake Rattenbury (Denmark) Frederik Schandorff (Germany) Harald Schlotter	No Entrants	(Belgium) Ward Sluys (Netherlands) Ted van Vliet (Netherlands) Michael Verhagen	No Entrants	(Austria) Dominik Baumann (Finland) Ilmari Korpivaara (Norway) Marcus Påverud (Germany) Harald Schlotter (Luxembourg) Yury Wagner	(Austria) Laura Kraihamer (Austria) Sehdi Sarmini (Austria) Ferdinand Stuck (Austria) Johannes Stuck	(United States) Gregg Gorski (Russia) Alexey Karachev (Norway) Aleksander Schjerpen (Germany) Harald Schlotter (Russia) Denis Soglaev
991 Winners	(United Kingdom) No. 950 Duel Racing	(France) No. 912 Porsche Lorient Racing	(Germany) No. 916 Modena Motorsports	(Belgium) No. 978 SpeedLover	(Luxembourg) No. 909 DUWO Racing	(Belgium) No. 978 Speed Lover	(France) No. 911 Porsche Lorient Racing
991 Winners	(Republic of Ireland) Charlie Eastwood (United Arab Emirates) Nabil Moutran (United Arab Emirates) Ramzi Moutran (United Arab Emirates) Sami Moutran	(France) Jean-Philippe Belloc (France) Pascal Gibon (France) Frederic Lelievre (France) Philippe Polette	(France) Philippe Descombes (Canada) John Shen (Denmark) Benny Simonsen (Netherlands) Francis Tjia	(United States) Dominique Bastien (Belgium) Wim Meulders	(Russia) Andrey Mukovoz (Russia) Sergey Peregudov (Russia) Stanislav Sidoruk	(United States) Dominique Bastien (Hong Kong) Nigel Farmer (Malaysia) Keong Liam Lim (Netherlands) Richard Verburg	(France) Frédéric Ancel (United States) Dominique Bastien (France) Jean-François Demorge (France) Eric Mouez
SP2 Winners	No Entrants	(Czech Republic) No. 224 RTR Projects	No Entrants				
SP2 Winners	No Entrants	(Czech Republic) Karel Bednar (Czech Republic) Erik Janiš (Czech Republic) Tomas Miniberger (Czech Republic) Sergej Pavlovec	No Entrants				
SP4 Winners	No Entrants				(Germany) No. 505 Mercedes-AMG; Team Driving Academy	(France) No. 526 Nordschleife Racing	No Entrants
SP4 Winners	No Entrants				(Netherlands) Rik Breukers (Germany) Maximilian Buhk (Germany) Hubert Haupt (Germany) Kenneth Heyer (United States) Charles Putman	(France) Sebastien Dussolliet (France) Sebastien Poisson (France) Guillaume Roman (France) Mathieu Sentis	No Entrants
GT4 Winners	(Germany) No. 426 MRS GT-Racing	(Switzerland) No. 50 Hofor Racing by Bonk Motorsport	Merged with SP3 Class	(Czech Republic) No. 224 RTR Projects	(Switzerland) No. 50 Hofor Racing by Bonk Motorsport	(Switzerland) No. 415 Orchid Racing Team	(United States) No. 450 RHC Jorgensen/Strom
GT4 Winners	(Croatia) Franjo Kovac (Sweden) Fredrik Lestrup (Czech Republic) Tomas Pekar (Germany) Thomas Tekaat	(Austria) Gustav Engljaehringer (Austria) Michael Fischer (Austria) Thomas Jäger (Switzerland) Martin Kroll (Germany) Michael Schrey	Merged with SP3 Class	(Austria) Eike Angermayr (Czech Republic) Tomáš Enge (Czech Republic) Jan Krabec (Czech Republic) Sergej Pavlovec	(Austria) Michael Fischer (Austria) Thomas Jäger (Switzerland) Martin Kroll (Germany) Alexander Prinz (Germany) Michael Schrey	(Switzerland) Emmanuel Bello (France) Laurent Misbach (Switzerland) Alexandre Mottet (Switzerland) Massimo Salamanca	(Netherlands) Danny van Dongen (United States) Daren Jorgensen (United States) Jon Miller (United States) Brett Strom

== See also ==
- 24H Series
- 2019 24H TCE Series
- 2019 Dubai 24 Hour
- 2019 24H Middle East Series
