= 2019 Dubai 24 Hour =

The layout of the Dubai Autodrome.

The 2019 Dubai 24 Hour was the 14th running of the Dubai 24 Hour. It was also the first round of both the 2019 24H GT Series and the 2019 24H TCE Series. The event was held on 11 to 13 January at the Dubai Autodrome, United Arab Emirates.

== Result ==
| Pos | Class | No | Entrant | Drivers | Car | Laps |
|---|---|---|---|---|---|---|
| 1 | A6-Pro | 88 | (Germany) Car Collection Motorsport | (Germany) Christopher Haase (Belgium) Frédéric Vervisch (Germany) Dimitri Parhofer (Netherlands) Rik Breukers | Audi R8 LMS Evo | 607 |
| 2 | A6-Pro | 7 | (Belgium) Audi Sport Team WRT | (Saudi Arabia) Mohammed Saud Fahad Al Saud (Netherlands) Michael Vergers (Germany) Christopher Mies (Belgium) Dries Vanthoor | Audi R8 LMS Evo | 606 |
| 3 | A6-Pro | 11 | (Czech Republic) Bohemia Energy Racing with Scuderia Praha | (Czech Republic) Jiří Písařík (Czech Republic) Josef Král (Italy) Matteo Malucelli | Ferrari 488 GT3 | 603 |
| 4 | A6-Pro | 63 | (Austria) GRT Grasser Racing Team | (Italy) Mirko Bortolotti (Germany) Christian Engelhart (Switzerland) Rolf Ineichen (Switzerland) Mark Ineichen | Lamborghini Huracán GT3 | 600 |
| 5 | A6-Pro | 99 | (Germany) Attempto Racing | (Slovakia) Stanislav Minsky (Austria) Klaus Bachler (Australia) Nick Foster (Germany) Marvin Dienst (Netherlands) Steijn Schothorst | Audi R8 LMS Evo | 597 |
| 6 | A6-Pro | 9 | (Germany) Mücke Motorsport | (Germany) Markus Winkelhock (Germany) Mike-David Ortmann (Germany) Andreas Weishaupt (Germany) Stefan Mücke (Switzerland) Ricardo Feller | Audi R8 LMS Evo | 597 |
| 7 | A6-Am | 25 | (Germany) HTP Motorsport | (Austria) Alexander Hrachowina (Austria) Martin Konrad (Germany) Bernd Schneider (Netherlands) Indy Dontje (Luxembourg) Brice Bosi | Mercedes-AMG GT3 | 595 |
| 8 | A6-Am | 91 | (Germany) Herberth Motorsport | (Switzerland) Daniel Allemann (Germany) Ralf Bohn (Germany) Alfred Renauer (Germany) Robert Renauer | Porsche 911 GT3 R | 594 |
| 9 | A6-Am | 34 | (Germany) Car Collection Motorsport | (Germany) Johannes Kirchhoff (Germany) Gustav Edelhoff (Germany) Elmar Grimm (Germany) Ingo Vogler | Audi R8 LMS Evo | 592 |
| 10 | A6-Am | 92 | Team Porsche Centre Hong Kong | (Hong Kong) Frank Yu (Hong Kong) Jonathan Hui (Hong Kong) Antares Au (Macau) Wing Kin Tse | Porsche 911 GT3 R | 592 |
| 11 | A6-Am | 12 | (Italy) Target Racing | (Denmark) Dennis Lind (Italy) Giacomo Altoè (Russia) Timur Boguslavskiy (Italy) Stefano Costantini (Germany) Alex Autumn | Lamborghini Huracán GT3 | 588 |
| 12 | A6-Am | 26 | (France) Saintéloc Racing | (Luxembourg) Christian Kelders (France) Daniel Desbrueres (France) Nyls Stievenart (France) Simon Gachet (Belgium) Pierre-Yves Paque | Audi R8 LMS Evo | 586 |
| 13 | A6-Am | 85 | (United States) CP Racing | (United States) Charles Putman (United States) Charles Espenlaub (United States) Joe Foster (United States) Shane Lewis | Mercedes-AMG GT3 | 585 |
| 14 | SPX | 710 | (Germany) Leipert Motorsport | (Kuwait) Khaled Al Mudhaf (Norway) Marcus Påverud (United Kingdom) Jake Rattenbury (Denmark) Frederik Schandorff (Germany) Harald Schlotter | Lamborghini Huracán Super Trofeo Evo | 581 |
| 15 | A6-Pro | 2 | (Germany) Black Falcon | (Saudi Arabia) Abdul-Aziz bin Turki Al Saud (Saudi Arabia) Saud Al Faisal (Netherlands) Yelmer Buurman (United Kingdom) Adam Christodoulou (Germany) Hubert Haupt | Mercedes-AMG GT3 | 579 |
| 16 | SPX | 990 | (Germany) MRS GT-Racing | (Brazil) Werner Neugebauer (Brazil) Daniel Schneider (Brazil) Ricardo Mauricio (Brazil) Dennis Dirani | Porsche 991 GT3 Cup | 576 |
| 17 | 991 | 950 | (United Kingdom) Duel Racing | (Republic of Ireland) Charlie Eastwood (Lebanon) Nabil Moutran (Lebanon) Ramzi Moutran (Lebanon) Sami Moutran | Porsche 991 GT3 Cup | 574 |
| 18 | 991 | 980 | (Germany) MRS GT-Racing | (Austria) Helmut Rödig (Austria) Christopher Zöchling (Poland) Gosia Rdest (Germany) Wolfgang Triller (Japan) Yutaka Matsushima | Porsche 991 GT3 Cup | 564 |
| 19 | 991 | 911 | (France) Porsche Lorient Racing | (France) Pascal Gibon (France) Lionel Amrouche (France) Frédéric Ancel | Porsche 991 GT3 Cup | 561 |
| 20 | 991 | 916 | (Germany) race:pro motorsport | (Germany) Bertram Hornung (Canada) John Shen (Denmark) Benny Simonsen (France) Philippe Descombes | Porsche 991 GT3 Cup | 557 |
| 21 | SPX | 778 | (Belgium) Speed Lover | (United States) Dominique Bastien (Hong Kong) Nigel Farmer (Belgium) Jean-Michel Gerome (France) Gilles Petit | Porsche 991 GT3 Cup | 555 |
| 22 | GT4 | 426 | (Germany) MRS GT-Racing | (Croatia) Franjo Kovac (Czech Republic) Tomas Pekar (Germany) Thomas Tekaat (Sweden) Fredrik Lestrup | BMW M4 GT4 | 552 |
| 23 | GT4 | 451 | (Germany) Sorg Rennsport | (Germany) Stephan Epp (Germany) Fidel Leib (Germany) Olaf Meyer (Germany) Björn Simon (United States) Simon Tibbett | BMW M4 GT4 | 547 |
| 24 | GT4 | 454 | (Belgium) QSR Racingschool | (Belgium) Jimmy de Breucker (Belgium) Rodrigue Gillion (Belgium) Nico Verdonck (Belgium) Michiel Verhaeren | Mercedes-AMG GT4 | 546 |
| 25 | GT4 | 430 | (United Kingdom) Century Motorsport | (United Kingdom) Mark Farmer (United Kingdom) Dominic Paul (United Kingdom) Jack Mitchell (United Kingdom) Adrian Willmott | BMW M4 GT4 | 546 |
| 26 | TCR | 112 | (Switzerland) Autorama Motorsport by Wolf-Power Racing | (Switzerland) Fabian Danz (Switzerland) Yannick Mettler (Germany) Marlon Menden (Switzerland) Stefan Tanner (Switzerland) Jérôme Ogay | Volkswagen Golf GTI TCR | 545 |
| 27 | SPX | 758 | (Belgium) VDS Racing Adventures | (Germany) Wolfgang Haugg (Belgium) Raphaël van der Straten (Belgium) José Close (Belgium) Joel van Loocke (Luxembourg) Hary Putz | MARC Mustang V8 | 544 |
| 28 | TCR | 125 | (Netherlands) Bas Koeten Racing | (Switzerland) Ronny Jost (Switzerland) Julien Apotheloz (Netherlands) Loek Hartog (Netherlands) Oscar Graeper | SEAT León TCR | 541 |
| 29 | A6-Pro | 35 | (Hong Kong) KCMG | (Japan) Katsumasa Chiyo (Japan) Tsugio Matsuda (Hong Kong) Shaun Thong (Italy) Andrea Gagliardini | Nissan GT-R Nismo GT3 | 540 |
| 30 | TCR | 101 | (Netherlands) Red Camel-Jordans.nl | (Netherlands) Ivo Breukers (Germany) Henry Littig (Australia) Cody Hill (Austria) Klaus Kresnik | SEAT Leon TCR | 538 |
| 31 | GT4 | 469 | (France) 3Y Technology | (France) Gilles Vannelet (France) Enzo Guibbert (United Kingdom) Lars Viljoen (United Arab Emirates) Nadir Zuhour (United Arab Emirates) Ahmed Al-Melaihi | BMW M4 GT4 | 537 |
| 32 | GT4 | 447 | (United Kingdom) Fox Motorsport | (United Kingdom) Jamie Stanley (United Kingdom) Glenn Sherwood (United Kingdom) Ben Clucas (United Kingdom) Andrew Perry | Audi R8 LMS GT4 | 534 |
| 33 | TCR | 154 | (France) TFT Racing | (France) Bruno Bazaud (France) Denis Caillon (Belgium) Jean-Lou Rihon (France) Sebastien Morales (France) Philippe Thirion | Audi RS3 LMS TCR | 532 |
| 34 | TCR | 188 | (Belgium) AC Motorsport | (France) Stephane Perrin (Belgium) Vincent Radermecker (Belgium) Tom Boonen (Belgium) Gilles Magnus | Audi RS3 LMS TCR | 529 |
| 35 | 991 | 969 | (Germany) MSG HRT Motorsport | (Germany) Holger Harmsen (Russia) Anton Lyubchenkov (Germany) Stefan Aust (Switzerland) Lucas Mauron | Porsche 991 Cup | 529 |
| 36 | GT4 | 429 | (United Kingdom) Century Motorsport | (United Kingdom) Thomas Canning (United Kingdom) Andrew Gordon-Colebrooke (United Kingdom) Nathan Freke (United Kingdom) JM Littman | BMW M4 GT4 | 525 |
| 37 | GT4 | 432 | (United Kingdom) Optimum Motorsport | (United Kingdom) Jack Butel (United Kingdom) Lewis Proctor (United Kingdom) Brent Millage (United Kingdom) Russ Olivant | Ginetta G55 GT4 | 517 |
| 38 | TCR | 100 | (Hong Kong) Team Work Motorsport | (Hong Kong) Yat Shing Wong (Hong Kong) Tak Chun Poon (Hong Kong) Kar Chue Fung (Hong Kong) Ka Tai Hui | Audi RS3 LMS TCR | 512 |
| 39 | GT4 | 405 | (United Kingdom) ERC SPORT | (Slovakia) Katarina Kyvalova (United Kingdom) Jon Minshaw (Italy) Gabriele Piana (United Kingdom) Ryan Ratcliffe | Mercedes-AMG GT4 | 510 |
| 40 | A6-Pro | 24 | (United Arab Emirates) GP Extreme | (Ivory Coast) Frédéric Fatien (South Africa) Jordan Grogor (United Kingdom) Stuart Hall (Netherlands) Nicky Pastorelli (France) Jean-Pierre Valentini | Porsche 911 GT3 R | 506 |
| 41 | Cup | 802 | (Germany) fun-M Motorsport | (Germany) Simon Klemund (Germany) Christopher Rink (Germany) Harald Rettich (Netherlands) Paul Sieljes (Greece) Ioannis Smyrlis | BMW M235i Cup | 502 |
| 42 | Cup | 840 | (Luxembourg) DUWO Racing | (France) Youssef Bassil (France) Thierry Chkondali (Luxembourg) Jean-Marie Dumont (France) Frédéric Schmit (France) Nicolas Schmit | BMW M235i Cup | 499 |
| 43 | 991 | 989 | (Germany) MRS GT-Racing | (Japan) Tamotsu Kondo (Japan) Kenji Abe (China) Xu Wei (Japan) Motoharu Sato (Japan) Naoki Yokomizo | Porsche 991 GT3 Cup | 493 |
| 44 | GT4 | 462 | (United Kingdom) Ciceley Motorsport | (United Kingdom) Frank Bird (United States) Ben Paliwoda (United Kingdom) Derek Pierce (United Kingdom) Jordan Witt | Mercedes-AMG GT4 | 480 |
| 45 | SPX | 717 | (Netherlands) Cor Euser Racing | (Netherlands) Cor Euser (Norway) Einar Thorsen (United Kingdom) Sam Allpass (Germany) Der Bommel (Netherlands) Dennis Houweling | BMW M3 | 479 |
| 46 | 991 | 991 | (Netherlands) NKPP Racing by Bas Koeten Racing | (Netherlands) Gijs Bessem (Netherlands) Bob Herber (Netherlands) Harry Hilders (Netherlands) Roeland Voerman | Porsche 991 GT3 Cup | 477 |
| 47 | SP3 | 301 | (France) Vortex V8 | (France) Philippe Bonnel (France) Thomas Cordelier (France) Franck Lefèvre (Switzerland) Nicolas Nobs | Vortex Scirocco GC 10 | 456 |
| 48 | SP3 | 378 | (United Kingdom) CWS Engineering | (France) Olivier Baron (United Kingdom) Angus Fender (United Kingdom) Steven Wells (United Kingdom) Colin White | Ginetta G55 GT4 Modified | 445 |
| 49 | A3 | 603 | (Belgium) G & R Motorsport | (Belgium) Geert Dierckx (Belgium) Jasper Dierckx (Belgium) Geert Houdhoofdt (Belgium) Danny van Dosselaer (Belgium) Karlo van Dosselaer | BMW M3 E46 | 435 |
| 50 | A6-Am | 33 | (Germany) Car Collection Motorsport | (Austria) Simon Reicher (Germany) Murod Sultanov (Australia) Martin Berry (Germany) Klaus Koch (Austria) Philipp Sager | Audi R8 LMS Evo | 426 |
| 51 | GT4 | 488 | (United Arab Emirates) Dragon Racing | (United Arab Emirates) Saeed Al Melaihi (United Kingdom) Robert Barff (United Kingdom) Gregory Caton (United Kingdom) Phil Quaife (United Kingdom) Josh Webster | Mercedes-AMG GT4 | 396 |
| 52 | TCR | 121 | (United Kingdom) J.W. Bird Motorsport | (United Kingdom) Paul Dehadray (United Kingdom) Kieran Griffin (United Kingdom) Liam Griffin (United Kingdom) Philip House | Volkswagen Golf GTI TCR | 387 |
| 53 | A3 | 634 | (Italy) Lotus PB Racing | (Italy) Michael Cordini (Italy) Matteo Deflorian (Italy) Stefano D'Aste (Italy) Nicolò Liana | Lotus Elise Cup | 383 |
| 54 | A6-Pro | 3 | (Germany) Black Falcon | (United Arab Emirates) Khaled Al Qubaisi (Netherlands) Jeroen Bleekemolen (United States) Ben Keating (Germany) Manuel Metzger (Germany) Luca Stolz | Mercedes-AMG GT3 | 380 |
| 55 | 991 | 979 | (Germany) MRS GT-Racing | (France) Olivier Baharian (France) Thierry Blaise (Denmark) Michael Markussen (Switzerland) Manuel Nicolaidis | Porsche 991 GT3 Cup | 377 |
| 56 | TCR | 133 | (Hungary) Zengő Motorsport | (Hungary) Tamas Horvath (Hungary) Gabor Kismarty-Lechner (Hungary) Gyorgy Kontra (Hungary) Csaba Tóth (Hungary) Zoltán Zengő | SEAT León TCR | 373 |
| 57 | A3 | 633 | (Italy) Lotus PB Racing | (Italy) Maurizio Fortina (Italy) Marco Fumagalli (Italy) Mauro Guastamacchia (Italy) Mark Speakerwas (Italy) Vito Utzieri | Lotus Elise Cup | 262 |
| DNF | A6-Pro | 23 | (Hong Kong) KCMG | (Switzerland) Alexandre Imperatori (United Kingdom) Oliver Jarvis (Italy) Edoardo Liberati (Germany) Philipp Wlazik (Australia) Josh Burdon | Nissan GT-R Nismo GT3 | 331 |
| DNF | SPX | 246 | (Germany) Reiter Engineering | (Poland) Adam Galas (Czech Republic) Jan Krabec (United States) Nicolai Elghanayan (Germany) Benjamin Mazatis | KTM X-Bow GT4 | 312 |
| DNF | TCR | 122 | (Hong Kong) KCMG | (Hong Kong) Paul Ip (Hong Kong) Hon Wah Ma (Hong Kong) Henry Lee, Jr. (Hong Kong) Cheuk Wai Yan (Hong Kong) Jim Ka To | Honda Civic Type R TCR (FK8) | 303 |
| DNF | GT4 | 450 | (United States) RHC Jorgensen/Strom | (United States) Darren Jorgensen (United States) Brett Strom (Australia) Gerard McLeod (Netherlands) Daniel van Dongen | BMW M4 GT4 | 291 |
| DNF | 991 | 999 | (United Kingdom) track-club | (United Kingdom) Adam Balon (United Kingdom) Adam Knight (United Kingdom) Marcus Jewell (United Kingdom) Ian Loggie | Porsche 991 GT3 Cup | 281 |
| DNF | GT4 | 50 | (Switzerland) Hofor Racing powered by Bonk Motorsport | (Switzerland) Martin Kroll (Germany) Michael Schrey (Austria) Gustav Engljähringer (Austria) Michael Fischer (Netherlands) Liesette Braams | BMW M4 GT4 | 277 |
| DNF | A6-Pro | 18 | (Netherlands) V8 Racing | (Netherlands) Rick Abresch (Netherlands) Max Braams (United Kingdom) Finlay Hutchison (Netherlands) Duncan Huisman (Netherlands) Nathan Wolf | Chevrolet Corvette C6 ZR1 | 273 |
| DNF | A6-Pro | 66 | (Germany) Attempto Racing | (Switzerland) Adrian Amstutz (Finland) Patrick Kujala (Italy) Mattia Drudi (South Africa) Kelvin van der Linde | Audi R8 LMS Evo | 265 |
| DNF | TCR | 111 | (United Arab Emirates) Atech Racing | (United Kingdom) Julian Griffin (United Kingdom) Will Morrison (United Kingdom) Colin Boyle (Australia) Peter England (United Kingdom) Jonathan Simmonds | SEAT Leon TCR | 253 |
| DNF | TCR | 129 | (Finland) LMS Racing by Bas Koeten Racing | (Finland) Antti Buri (Finland) Olli Kangas (Finland) Kari-Pekka Laaksonen | Audi RS3 LMS TCR | 251 |
| DNF | SPX | 701 | (France) Vortex V8 | (France) Arnaud Gomez (France) Olivier Gomez (France) Alban Varutti | Vortex V8 Prototype 1.0 | 201 |
| DNF | A6-Am | 10 | (Switzerland) Hofor-Racing | (Switzerland) Michael Kroll (Switzerland) Chantal Prinz (Netherlands) Christiaan Frankenhout (Germany) Alexander Prinz (Germany) Kenneth Heyer | Mercedes-AMG GT3 | 188 |
| DNF | TCR | 138 | (United Kingdom) Team Dynamics | (United Kingdom) James Kaye (United Kingdom) William Neal (United Kingdom) Henry Neal (United Kingdom) Jake Giddings (Australia) Aaron Cameron | Audi RS3 LMS TCR | 179 |
| DNF | SPX | 247 | (Australia) Exedra Motorsport – Reiter | (Switzerland) Mathias Beche (Australia) Dean Koutsoumidis (Australia) James Winslow (Australia) Glen Wood | KTM X-Bow GT4 | 173 |
| DNF | 991 | 912 | (France) Porsche Lorient Racing | (France) Mathieu Pontais (France) Cyril Calmon (France) Eric Mouez (France) Remi Terrail | Porsche 991 GT3 Cup | 129 |
| DNF | A6-Am | 19 | (Netherlands) MP Motorsport | (Netherlands) Daniël de Jong (Netherlands) Jaap van Lagen (Netherlands) Bert de Huis (Netherlands) Henk de Jong | Mercedes-AMG GT3 | 91 |
| DNF | 991 | 968 | (Russia) Vintic & Shpuntic by HRT | (Russia) Andrey Mukovoz (Russia) Stanislav Sidoruk (Russia) Stepan Krumilov (Russia) Sergey Peregudov | Porsche 991 GT3 Cup | 16 |
| DNS | SP3 | 312 | (Switzerland) Amag First Centri Porsche Ticino | (Switzerland) Michele Di Bona (Switzerland) Valerio Presezzi (Switzerland) Adriano Pan (Italy) Alessandro Baccani (Switzerland) Ivan Jacoma | Porsche Cayman GT4 CS | |
