= 12 Hours of Brno =

In October 1950 a 12-hour race combined for SportsCars and Saloon Cars was held at the Brno circuit.

The race organizers created an interesting and unique mathematical formula (the so-called power output indicator) to equalize the potential of all cars. The formula was based on a predetermined average speed that differed for cars with various engine capacity, and the corresponding distance expected to be covered by each car over the 12-hour period. The actual distance traveled by a car was then divided by this expected distance to arrive at a quotient, and the results were based on the values of this quotient. Consequently, even cars with the smallest engine size could win the race if they reached sufficient distance, while anybody failing to complete the expected distance was not classified at all. The calculation was further complicated by a provision that any lap completed below the projected average speed was not counted toward the total traveled distance.

Consequently, the overall winner was Treybal with saloon Bristol, who reached a quotient of 1.268 while travelling 1121.158 km (4th longest distance). The pair Pavelka/Zd. Sojka with Tatraplán Sport covered the longest distance of 1192.933 km but their quotient of 1.098 was good for only 14th place in final classification. The race was seen as a great success, yet initial plans to hold a 24-hour race in the following year and thus establish an endurance racing tradition in Brno were eventually abandoned.

== 24H Series ==
In 2015 the 24H Series returned to the Brno circuit for a 12-hour race, called the 12H Epilog Brno. It was the last race of the season.

== See also ==
- Brno 2 Hours 30 Minutes
