= 2021 12 Hours of Hockenheimring =

The layout of the Hockenheimring.

The 2021 Hankook 12 Hours of Hockenheimring was the inaugural running of the 12 Hours of Hockenheimring which took place on 22 and 23 May 2021. It was also the fourth round of the 2021 24H GT and TCE Series and the second 24H Series event at the circuit, having held a 16-hour race in 2020.

== Schedule ==
Date	Time (local: CEST)	Event	Distance
Friday, 21 May	17:40 - 19:00	Practice (Both classes)	80 Mins
Saturday, 22 May	09:00 - 09:30	Qualifying - TCE	30 Mins
Saturday, 22 May	09:35 - 10:35	Qualifying - GT	30 Mins
Saturday, 22 May	13:30 - 20:00	Race	6 Hours, 30 Mins
Sunday, 23 May	14:30 - 20:00	Race	5 Hours, 30 Mins

== Entry list ==
30 cars are entered into the event; 22 GT cars and 8 TCEs.

Team	Car	Engine	No.	Drivers
GT3 (9 entries)
(Germany) Leipert Motorsport	Lamborghini Huracán GT3 Evo	Lamborghini 5.2 L V10	10	(United States) Tyler Cooke (Germany) Fidel Leib (New Zealand) Brendon Leitch (United Kingdom) Seb Morris
(Czech Republic) MiddleCap racing with Scuderia Praha	Ferrari 488 GT3	Ferrari 3.9 L Twin-Turbo V8	11	(Czech Republic) Josef Král (Slovakia) Matúš Výboh (Czech Republic) Dennis Waszek
(Germany) Rutronik Racing by TECE	Audi R8 LMS Evo	Audi 5.2 L V10	18	(Austria) Michael Doppelmayr (Germany) Elia Erhart (Germany) Swen Herberger (Germany) Pierre Kaffer
(Germany) Car Collection Motorsport	Audi R8 LMS Evo	Audi 5.2 L V10	34	(Germany) Gustav Edelhoff (Germany) Max Edelhoff (Germany) Elmar Grimm
(Germany) Car Collection Motorsport	Audi R8 LMS Evo	Audi 5.2 L V10	88	(Germany) Christian Kranenberg (Germany) Martin Lechmann (Belgium) Pierre-Yves Paque (United States) Vincent Piemonte
(Italy) MP Racing	Mercedes-AMG GT3 Evo	Mercedes-AMG M159 6.2 L V8	58	(Italy) Corinna Gostner (Italy) Manuela Gostner (Italy) Thomas Gostner
(Switzerland) Haegeli by T2 Racing	Porsche 911 GT3 R	Porsche 4.0 L Flat-6	66	(Germany) Marc Basseng (Switzerland) Pieder Decurtins (Germany) Manuel Lauck
(United States) CP Racing	Mercedes-AMG GT3 Evo	Mercedes-AMG M159 6.2 L V8	85	(United States) Charles Espenlaub (United States) Joe Foster (United States) Shane Lewis (United States) Charles Putman
(Germany) Herberth Motorsport	Ferrari 488 GT3 Evo 2020	Ferrari 3.9 L Twin-Turbo V8	92	(Germany) "Bobby Gonzales" (Germany) Jürgen Häring (Germany) Tim Müller (Germany) Alfred Renauer
GTX (5 entries)
(France) Vortex V8	Vortex 1.0 GTX	Chevrolet 6.2 L V8	701	(France) Arnaud Gomez (France) Philippe Bonnel (France) Bastien Gouret (Switzerland) Nicolas Nobs
(Germany) 9und11 Racing	Porsche 991 GT3 Cup MR	Porsche 4.0 L Flat-6	719	(Germany) Georg Goder (Germany) Ralf Oehme (Germany) Tim Scheerbrarth (Germany) Martin Schlüter
(Germany) Reiter Engineering	KTM X-Bow GTX Concept	Audi 2.5 L I5	724	(Austria) Eike Angermayr (United States) Nicolai Elghanayan (Austria) Horst Felbermayr Jr. (Norway) Mads Siljehaug
(Germany) Reiter Engineering	KTM X-Bow GTX Concept	Audi 2.5 L I5	725	(Netherlands) Peter Kox (Netherlands) Nico Pronk (Netherlands) Dennis Retera
(Netherlands) Red Camel-Jordans.nl	Porsche 992 GT3 Cup	Porsche 4.0 L Flat-6	999	(Netherlands) Ivo Breukers (Netherlands) Luc Breukers (Netherlands) Rik Breukers
991 (6 entries)
(Luxembourg) DUWO Racing	Porsche 991 GT3 Cup II	Porsche 4.0 L Flat-6	909	(Russia) Andrey Mukovoz (Russia) Sergey Peregudov (Russia) Stanislav Sidoruk
(Switzerland) Stadler Motorsport	Porsche 991 GT3 Cup II	Porsche 4.0 L Flat-6	920	(Switzerland) Enzo Calderari (Switzerland) Paul Kasper (Switzerland) Philipe Menotti (Switzerland) Ramon Werner
(Netherlands) / Bas Koeten Racing (Note: Car No. 925 entered as Bas Koeten Racing and car No. 991 entered as NKPP Racing by Bas Koeten Racing.); (Netherlands) / NKPP Racing by Bas Koeten Racing	Porsche 991 GT3 Cup II	Porsche 4.0 L Flat-6	925	(Netherlands) Glenn van Berlo (Netherlands) Marcel van Berlo (Netherlands) Bart van Helden
(Netherlands) / Bas Koeten Racing; (Netherlands) / NKPP Racing by Bas Koeten Racing	Porsche 991 GT3 Cup II	Porsche 4.0 L Flat-6	991	(Netherlands) Bas Barenbrug (Netherlands) Gijs Bessem (Netherlands) Harry Hilders
(Italy) Willi Motorsport by Ebimotors	Porsche 991 GT3 Cup II	Porsche 4.0 L Flat-6	955	(Italy) Fabrizio Broggi (Italy) Sabino de Castro (Romania) Sergiu Nicolae
(Germany) MRS GT-Racing	Porsche 991 GT3 Cup II	Porsche 4.0 L Flat-6	989	(United Arab Emirates) Saif Alameri (Russia) Nikolai Gadetsky (Netherlands) Thierry Vermeulen
GT4 (2 entries)
(Germany) PROsport Performance AMR	Aston Martin Vantage AMR GT4	Aston Martin 4.0 L Turbo V8	401	(Belgium) Rodrigue Gillion (Belgium) Kurt Hensen (Belgium) Nico Verdonck
(Canada) ST Racing	BMW M4 GT4	BMW N55 3.0 L Twin-Turbo I6	438	(United States) Chandler Hull (United States) Jon Miller (Canada) Samantha Tan (Canada) Nick Wittmer
TCR (5 entries)
(Switzerland) Autorama Motorsport by Wolf-Power Racing	Volkswagen Golf GTI TCR	Volkswagen 2.0 L I4	1	(Norway) Emil Heyerdahl (Austria) Constantin Kletzer (Switzerland) Jasmin Preisig
(Switzerland) Autorama Motorsport by Wolf-Power Racing	Volkswagen Golf GTI TCR	Volkswagen 2.0 L I4	112	(Switzerland) Christophe Hurni (United Kingdom) Rhys Lloyd (Switzerland) Christoph Lenz (Switzerland) Yannick Mettler
(Lithuania) GSR Motorsport	Volkswagen Golf GTI TCR	Volkswagen 2.0 L I4	105	(Lithuania) Ernesta Globytė (Lithuania) Rokas Kvedaras (Lithuania) Rolandas Salys (Lithuania) Rimvydas Savickas
(Switzerland) TOPCAR Sport	CUPRA León TCR	Volkswagen 2.0 L I4	131	(Switzerland) Fabian Danz (Switzerland) Ronny Jost (Switzerland) Ruedi Jost
(Belgium) AC Motorsport	Audi RS 3 LMS TCR	Volkswagen 2.0 L I4	188	(Belgium) Mathieu Detry (France) Stéphane Perrin (Germany) Stefan Wieninger
TCX (3 entries)
(Netherlands) Munckhof Racing	BMW M4 GTR	BMW B58B30 3.0 L Twin-Turbo I6	210	(Netherlands) Marco Poland (Netherlands) Eric van den Munckhof
(Switzerland) Autorama Motorsport	SEAT León Cup Racer	Volkswagen 2.0 L I4	211	(Switzerland) Armando Stanco (Switzerland) Dario Stanco (Switzerland) Luigi Stanco
(United Kingdom) CWS Engineering	Ginetta G55 Supercup	Ford Cyclone 3.7 L V6	278	(United States) Jean-Francois Brunot (United Kingdom) Colin White

== Results ==
=== Qualifying ===
==== TCE ====
Fastest in class in bold.

Pos.	Class	No.	Team	Time
1	**TCX**	**278**	**(United Kingdom) CWS Engineering**	**1:49.819**
2	**TCR**	**112**	**(Switzerland) Autorama Motorsport by Wolf-Power Racing**	**1:49.965**
3	TCR	188	(Belgium) AC Motorsport	1:50.335
4	TCR	1	(Switzerland) Autorama Motorsport by Wolf-Power Racing	1:50.345
5	TCR	105	(Lithuania) GSR Motorsport	1:52.648
6	TCX	211	(Switzerland) Autorama Motorsport	1:52.879
7	TCX	210	(Netherlands) Munckhof Racing	1:53.008
8	TCR	131	(Switzerland) TOPCAR Sport	1:59.603

==== GT ====
Fastest in class in bold.

Pos.	Class	No.	Team	Time
1	**GT3**	**11**	**(Czech Republic) MiddleCap racing with Scuderia Praha**	**1:39.109**
2	GT3	34	(Germany) Car Collection Motorsport	1:39.484
3	GT3	10	(Germany) Leipert Motorsport	1:39.490
4	GT3	18	(Germany) Rutronik Racing by TECE	1:39.493
5	GT3	66	(Switzerland) Haegeli by T2 Racing	1:39.914
6	GT3	92	(Germany) Herberth Motorsport	1:40.112
7	GT3	85	(United States) CP Racing	1:40.154
8	GT3	88	(Germany) Car Collection Motorsport	1:42.006
9	**GTX**	**724**	**(Germany) Reiter Engineering**	**1:42.220**
10	GT3	58	(Italy) MP Racing	1:42.230
11	GTX	791	(Germany) 9und11 Racing	1:42.925
12	GTX	725	(Germany) Reiter Engineering	1:43.274
13	**991**	**925**	**(Netherlands) Bas Koeten Racing**	**1:43.532**
14	991	989	(Germany) MRS-GT Racing	1:43.602
15	991	955	(Romania) Willi Motorsport by Ebimotors	1:43.935
16	991	920	(Switzerland) Stadler Motorsport	1:45.255
17	991	909	(Luxembourg) DUWO Racing	1:45.883
18	991	991	(Netherlands) NKPP Racing by Bas Koeten Racing	1:47.105
19	GTX	701	(France) Vortex V8	1:47.670
20	**GT4**	**438**	**(Canada) ST Racing**	**1:48.210**
21	GT4	401	(Germany) PROsport Performance AMR	1:48.343
22	GTX	999	(Netherlands) Red Camel-Jordans.nl	No time

=== Race ===
==== Part 1 ====
Class winner in bold.

Pos	Class	No.	Team	Drivers	Chassis	Time/Reason	Laps
Pos	Class	No.	Team	Drivers	Engine	Time/Reason	Laps
1	**GT3**	**11**	**(Czech Republic) MiddleCap racing with Scuderia Praha**	**(Czech Republic) Josef Král (Slovakia) Matúš Výboh (Czech Republic) Dennis Waszek**	**Ferrari 488 GT3**	**6:31:34.249**	**207**
1	**GT3**	**11**	**(Czech Republic) MiddleCap racing with Scuderia Praha**	**(Czech Republic) Josef Král (Slovakia) Matúš Výboh (Czech Republic) Dennis Waszek**	**Ferrari 3.9 L Twin-Turbo V8**	**6:31:34.249**	**207**
2	GT3	66	(Switzerland) Haegeli by T2 Racing	(Germany) Marc Basseng (Switzerland) Pieder Decurtins (Germany) Manuel Lauck	Porsche 911 GT3 R (2019)	+40.949	207
2	GT3	66	(Switzerland) Haegeli by T2 Racing	(Germany) Marc Basseng (Switzerland) Pieder Decurtins (Germany) Manuel Lauck	Porsche 4.0 L Flat-6	+40.949	207
3	GT3	10	(Germany) Leipert Motorsport	(United States) Tyler Cooke (Germany) Fidel Leib (New Zealand) Brendon Leitch (United Kingdom) Seb Morris	Lamborghini Huracán GT3 Evo	+1:18.630	207
3	GT3	10	(Germany) Leipert Motorsport	(United States) Tyler Cooke (Germany) Fidel Leib (New Zealand) Brendon Leitch (United Kingdom) Seb Morris	Lamborghini 5.2 L V10	+1:18.630	207
4	GT3	85	(United States) CP Racing	(United States) Charles Espenlaub (United States) Joe Foster (United States) Shane Lewis (United States) Charles Putman	Mercedes-AMG GT3 Evo	+1 Lap	206
4	GT3	85	(United States) CP Racing	(United States) Charles Espenlaub (United States) Joe Foster (United States) Shane Lewis (United States) Charles Putman	Mercedes-AMG M159 6.2 L V8	+1 Lap	206
5	GT3	18	(Germany) Rutronik Racing by TECE	(Austria) Michael Doppelmayr (Germany) Elia Erhart (Germany) Swen Herberger (Germany) Pierre Kaffer	Audi R8 LMS Evo	+2 Laps	205
5	GT3	18	(Germany) Rutronik Racing by TECE	(Austria) Michael Doppelmayr (Germany) Elia Erhart (Germany) Swen Herberger (Germany) Pierre Kaffer	Audi 5.2 L V10	+2 Laps	205
6	GT3	34	(Germany) Car Collection Motorsport	(Germany) Gustav Edelhoff (Germany) Max Edelhoff (Germany) Elmar Grimm	Audi R8 LMS Evo	+3 Laps	204
6	GT3	34	(Germany) Car Collection Motorsport	(Germany) Gustav Edelhoff (Germany) Max Edelhoff (Germany) Elmar Grimm	Audi 5.2 L V10	+3 Laps	204
7	GT3	88	(Germany) Car Collection Motorsport	(Germany) Christian Kranenberg (Germany) Martin Lechmann (Belgium) Pierre-Yves Paque (United States) Vincent Piemonte	Audi R8 LMS Evo	+4 Laps	203
7	GT3	88	(Germany) Car Collection Motorsport	(Germany) Christian Kranenberg (Germany) Martin Lechmann (Belgium) Pierre-Yves Paque (United States) Vincent Piemonte	Audi 5.2 L V10	+4 Laps	203
8 DNF	**GTX**	**724**	**(Germany) Reiter Engineering**	**(Austria) Eike Angermayr (United States) Nicolai Elghanayan (Austria) Horst Felbermayr Jr. (Norway) Mads Siljehaug**	**KTM X-Bow GTX Concept**	**+8 Laps**	**199**
8 DNF	**GTX**	**724**	**(Germany) Reiter Engineering**	**(Austria) Eike Angermayr (United States) Nicolai Elghanayan (Austria) Horst Felbermayr Jr. (Norway) Mads Siljehaug**	**Audi 2.5 L I5**	**+8 Laps**	**199**
9	**991**	**925**	**(Netherlands) Bas Koeten Racing**	**(Netherlands) Glenn van Berlo (Netherlands) Marcel van Berlo (Netherlands) Bart van Helden**	**Porsche 991 GT3 II Cup**	**+8 Laps**	**199**
9	**991**	**925**	**(Netherlands) Bas Koeten Racing**	**(Netherlands) Glenn van Berlo (Netherlands) Marcel van Berlo (Netherlands) Bart van Helden**	**Porsche 4.0 L Flat-6**	**+8 Laps**	**199**
10	991	991	(Netherlands) NKPP Racing by Bas Koeten Racing	(Netherlands) Bas Barenbrug (Netherlands) Gijs Bessem (Netherlands) Harry Hilders	Porsche 991 GT3 II Cup	+10 Laps	197
10	991	991	(Netherlands) NKPP Racing by Bas Koeten Racing	(Netherlands) Bas Barenbrug (Netherlands) Gijs Bessem (Netherlands) Harry Hilders	Porsche 4.0 L Flat-6	+10 Laps	197
11	991	955	(Romania) Willi Motorsport by Ebimotors	(Italy) Fabrizio Broggi (Italy) Sabino de Castro (Romania) Sergiu Nicolae	Porsche 991 GT3 II Cup	+10 Laps	197
11	991	955	(Romania) Willi Motorsport by Ebimotors	(Italy) Fabrizio Broggi (Italy) Sabino de Castro (Romania) Sergiu Nicolae	Porsche 4.0 L Flat-6	+10 Laps	197
12	991	909	(Luxembourg) DUWO Racing	(Russia) Andrey Mukovoz (Russia) Sergey Peregudov (Russia) Stanislav Sidoruk	Porsche 991 GT3 II Cup	+10 Laps	197
12	991	909	(Luxembourg) DUWO Racing	(Russia) Andrey Mukovoz (Russia) Sergey Peregudov (Russia) Stanislav Sidoruk	Porsche 4.0 L Flat-6	+10 Laps	197
13	GTX	719	(Germany) 9und11 Racing	(Germany) Georg Goder (Germany) Ralf Oehme (Germany) Tim Scheerbrarth (Germany) Martin Schlüter	Porsche 991 GT3 Cup MR	+11 Laps	196
13	GTX	719	(Germany) 9und11 Racing	(Germany) Georg Goder (Germany) Ralf Oehme (Germany) Tim Scheerbrarth (Germany) Martin Schlüter	Porsche 4.0 L Flat-6	+11 Laps	196
14	991	920	(Switzerland) Stadler Motorsport	(Switzerland) Enzo Calderari (Switzerland) Paul Kasper (Switzerland) Philipe Menotti (Switzerland) Ramon Werner	Porsche 991 GT3 II Cup	+15 Laps	192
14	991	920	(Switzerland) Stadler Motorsport	(Switzerland) Enzo Calderari (Switzerland) Paul Kasper (Switzerland) Philipe Menotti (Switzerland) Ramon Werner	Porsche 4.0 L Flat-6	+15 Laps	192
15	**GT4**	**438**	**(Canada) ST Racing**	**(United States) Chandler Hull (United States) Jon Miller (Canada) Samantha Tan (Canada) Nick Wittmer**	**BMW M4 GT4**	**+16 Laps**	**191**
15	**GT4**	**438**	**(Canada) ST Racing**	**(United States) Chandler Hull (United States) Jon Miller (Canada) Samantha Tan (Canada) Nick Wittmer**	**BMW N55 3.0 L Twin-Turbo I6**	**+16 Laps**	**191**
16	**TCR**	**1**	**(Switzerland) Autorama Motorsport by Wolf-Power Racing**	**(Norway) Emil Heyerdahl (Austria) Constantin Kletzer (Switzerland) Jasmin Preisig**	**Volkswagen Golf GTI TCR**	**+18 Laps**	**189**
16	**TCR**	**1**	**(Switzerland) Autorama Motorsport by Wolf-Power Racing**	**(Norway) Emil Heyerdahl (Austria) Constantin Kletzer (Switzerland) Jasmin Preisig**	**Volkswagen 2.0 L I4**	**+18 Laps**	**189**
17	TCR	188	(Belgium) AC Motorsport	(Belgium) Mathieu Detr (France) Stéphane Perrin (Germany) Stefan Wieninger	Audi RS 3 LMS TCR	+18 Laps	189
17	TCR	188	(Belgium) AC Motorsport	(Belgium) Mathieu Detr (France) Stéphane Perrin (Germany) Stefan Wieninger	Volkswagen 2.0 L I4	+18 Laps	189
18	TCR	112	(Switzerland) Autorama Motorsport by Wolf-Power Racing	(Switzerland) Christophe Hurni (United Kingdom) Rhys Lloyd (Switzerland) Christoph Lenz (Switzerland) Yannick Mettler	Volkswagen Golf GTI TCR	+19 Laps	188
18	TCR	112	(Switzerland) Autorama Motorsport by Wolf-Power Racing	(Switzerland) Christophe Hurni (United Kingdom) Rhys Lloyd (Switzerland) Christoph Lenz (Switzerland) Yannick Mettler	Volkswagen 2.0 L I4	+19 Laps	188
19	**TCX**	**278**	**(United Kingdom) CWS Engineering**	**(United States) Jean-Francois Brunot (United Kingdom) Colin White**	**Ginetta G55 Supercup**	**+19 Laps**	**188**
19	**TCX**	**278**	**(United Kingdom) CWS Engineering**	**(United States) Jean-Francois Brunot (United Kingdom) Colin White**	**Ford Cyclone 3.7 L V6**	**+19 Laps**	**188**
20	TCX	210	(Netherlands) Munckhof Racing	(Netherlands) Marco Poland (Netherlands) Eric van den Munckhof	BMW M4 GTR	+21 Laps	186
20	TCX	210	(Netherlands) Munckhof Racing	(Netherlands) Marco Poland (Netherlands) Eric van den Munckhof	BMW B58B30 3.0 L Twin-Turbo I6	+21 Laps	186
21	GT4	401	(Germany) PROsport Performance AMR	(Belgium) Rodrigue Gillion (Belgium) Kurt Hensen (Belgium) Nico Verdonck	Aston Martin Vantage AMR GT4	+22 Laps	185
21	GT4	401	(Germany) PROsport Performance AMR	(Belgium) Rodrigue Gillion (Belgium) Kurt Hensen (Belgium) Nico Verdonck	Aston Martin 4.0 L Turbo V8	+22 Laps	185
22	TCR	105	(Lithuania) GSR Motorsport	(Lithuania) Ernesta Globytė (Lithuania) Rokas Kvedaras (Lithuania) Rolandas Salys (Lithuania) Rimvydas Savickas	Volkswagen Golf GTI TCR	+24 Laps	183
22	TCR	105	(Lithuania) GSR Motorsport	(Lithuania) Ernesta Globytė (Lithuania) Rokas Kvedaras (Lithuania) Rolandas Salys (Lithuania) Rimvydas Savickas	Volkswagen 2.0 L I4	+24 Laps	183
23 DNF	GT3	58	(Italy) MP Racing	(Italy) Corinna Gostner (Italy) Manuela Gostner (Italy) Thomas Gostner	Mercedes-AMG GT3 Evo	+25 Laps	182
23 DNF	GT3	58	(Italy) MP Racing	(Italy) Corinna Gostner (Italy) Manuela Gostner (Italy) Thomas Gostner	Mercedes-AMG M159 6.2 L V8	+25 Laps	182
24	TCX	211	(Switzerland) Autorama Motorsport	(Switzerland) Armando Stanco (Switzerland) Dario Stanco (Switzerland) Luigi Stanco	SEAT León Cup Racer	+26 Laps	181
24	TCX	211	(Switzerland) Autorama Motorsport	(Switzerland) Armando Stanco (Switzerland) Dario Stanco (Switzerland) Luigi Stanco	Volkswagen 2.0 L I4	+26 Laps	181
25	TCR	131	(Switzerland) TOPCAR Sport	(Switzerland) Fabian Danz (Switzerland) Ronny Jost (Switzerland) Ruedi Jost	CUPRA León TCR	+27 Laps	180
25	TCR	131	(Switzerland) TOPCAR Sport	(Switzerland) Fabian Danz (Switzerland) Ronny Jost (Switzerland) Ruedi Jost	Volkswagen 2.0 L I4	+27 Laps	180
26	GTX	701	(France) Vortex V8	(France) Arnaud Gomez (France) Philippe Bonnel (France) Bastien Gouret (Switzerland) Nicolas Nobs	Vortex 1.0 GTX	+36 Laps	171
26	GTX	701	(France) Vortex V8	(France) Arnaud Gomez (France) Philippe Bonnel (France) Bastien Gouret (Switzerland) Nicolas Nobs	Chevrolet 6.2 L V8	+36 Laps	171
27	GTX	999	(Netherlands) Red Camel-Jordans.nl	(Netherlands) Ivo Breukers (Netherlands) Luc Breukers (Netherlands) Rik Breukers	Porsche 992 GT3 Cup	+67 Laps	140
27	GTX	999	(Netherlands) Red Camel-Jordans.nl	(Netherlands) Ivo Breukers (Netherlands) Luc Breukers (Netherlands) Rik Breukers	Porsche 4.0 L Flat-6	+67 Laps	140
28 DNF	991	989	(Germany) MRS GT-Racing	(United Arab Emirates) Saif Alameri (Russia) Nikolai Gadetsky (Netherlands) Thierry Vermeulen	Porsche 991 GT3 Cup II	+68 Laps	139
28 DNF	991	989	(Germany) MRS GT-Racing	(United Arab Emirates) Saif Alameri (Russia) Nikolai Gadetsky (Netherlands) Thierry Vermeulen	Porsche 4.0 L Flat-6	+68 Laps	139
29	GT3	92	(Germany) Herberth Motorsport	(Germany) "Bobby Gonzales" (Germany) Jürgen Häring (Germany) Tim Müller (Germany) Alfred Renauer	Ferrari 488 GT3 Evo 2020	+74 Laps	133
29	GT3	92	(Germany) Herberth Motorsport	(Germany) "Bobby Gonzales" (Germany) Jürgen Häring (Germany) Tim Müller (Germany) Alfred Renauer	Ferrari 3.9 L Twin-Turbo V8	+74 Laps	133
30 DNF	GTX	725	(Germany) Reiter Engineering	(Netherlands) Peter Kox (Netherlands) Nico Pronk (Netherlands) Dennis Retera	KTM X-Bow GTX Concept	+129 Laps	78
30 DNF	GTX	725	(Germany) Reiter Engineering	(Netherlands) Peter Kox (Netherlands) Nico Pronk (Netherlands) Dennis Retera	Audi 2.5 L I5	+129 Laps	78

==== Part 2 ====
Class winner in bold.

Pos	Class	No.	Team	Drivers	Chassis	Time/Reason	Laps
Pos	Class	No.	Team	Drivers	Engine	Time/Reason	Laps
1	**GT3**	**66**	**(Switzerland) Haegeli by T2 Racing**	**(Germany) Marc Basseng (Switzerland) Pieder Decurtins (Germany) Manuel Lauck**	**Porsche 911 GT3 R (2019)**	**5:31:33.589**	**384**
1	**GT3**	**66**	**(Switzerland) Haegeli by T2 Racing**	**(Germany) Marc Basseng (Switzerland) Pieder Decurtins (Germany) Manuel Lauck**	**Porsche 4.0 L Flat-6**	**5:31:33.589**	**384**
2	GT3	11	(Czech Republic) MiddleCap racing with Scuderia Praha	(Czech Republic) Josef Král (Slovakia) Matúš Výboh (Czech Republic) Dennis Waszek	Ferrari 488 GT3	+53.359	384
2	GT3	11	(Czech Republic) MiddleCap racing with Scuderia Praha	(Czech Republic) Josef Král (Slovakia) Matúš Výboh (Czech Republic) Dennis Waszek	Ferrari 3.9 L Twin-Turbo V8	+53.359	384
3	GT3	10	(Germany) Leipert Motorsport	(United States) Tyler Cooke (Germany) Fidel Leib (New Zealand) Brendon Leitch (United Kingdom) Seb Morris	Lamborghini Huracán GT3 Evo	+2 Laps	382
3	GT3	10	(Germany) Leipert Motorsport	(United States) Tyler Cooke (Germany) Fidel Leib (New Zealand) Brendon Leitch (United Kingdom) Seb Morris	Lamborghini 5.2 L V10	+2 Laps	382
4	GT3	85	(United States) CP Racing	(United States) Charles Espenlaub (United States) Joe Foster (United States) Shane Lewis (United States) Charles Putman	Mercedes-AMG GT3 Evo	+2 Laps	382
4	GT3	85	(United States) CP Racing	(United States) Charles Espenlaub (United States) Joe Foster (United States) Shane Lewis (United States) Charles Putman	Mercedes-AMG M159 6.2 L V8	+2 Laps	382
5	GT3	18	(Germany) Rutronik Racing by TECE	(Austria) Michael Doppelmayr (Germany) Elia Erhart (Germany) Swen Herberger (Germany) Pierre Kaffer	Audi R8 LMS Evo	+3 Laps	381
5	GT3	18	(Germany) Rutronik Racing by TECE	(Austria) Michael Doppelmayr (Germany) Elia Erhart (Germany) Swen Herberger (Germany) Pierre Kaffer	Audi 5.2 L V10	+3 Laps	381
6	GT3	34	(Germany) Car Collection Motorsport	(Germany) Gustav Edelhoff (Germany) Max Edelhoff (Germany) Elmar Grimm	Audi R8 LMS Evo	+6 Laps	378
6	GT3	34	(Germany) Car Collection Motorsport	(Germany) Gustav Edelhoff (Germany) Max Edelhoff (Germany) Elmar Grimm	Audi 5.2 L V10	+6 Laps	378
7	GT3	88	(Germany) Car Collection Motorsport	(Germany) Christian Kranenberg (Germany) Martin Lechmann (Belgium) Pierre-Yves Paque (United States) Vincent Piemonte	Audi R8 LMS Evo	+10 Laps	374
7	GT3	88	(Germany) Car Collection Motorsport	(Germany) Christian Kranenberg (Germany) Martin Lechmann (Belgium) Pierre-Yves Paque (United States) Vincent Piemonte	Audi 5.2 L V10	+10 Laps	374
8	**991**	**925**	**(Netherlands) Bas Koeten Racing**	**(Netherlands) Glenn van Berlo (Netherlands) Marcel van Berlo (Netherlands) Bart van Helden**	**Porsche 991 GT3 II Cup**	**+14 Laps**	**370**
8	**991**	**925**	**(Netherlands) Bas Koeten Racing**	**(Netherlands) Glenn van Berlo (Netherlands) Marcel van Berlo (Netherlands) Bart van Helden**	**Porsche 4.0 L Flat-6**	**+14 Laps**	**370**
9	991	991	(Netherlands) NKPP Racing by Bas Koeten Racing	(Netherlands) Bas Barenbrug (Netherlands) Gijs Bessem (Netherlands) Harry Hilders	Porsche 991 GT3 II Cup	+17 Laps	367
9	991	991	(Netherlands) NKPP Racing by Bas Koeten Racing	(Netherlands) Bas Barenbrug (Netherlands) Gijs Bessem (Netherlands) Harry Hilders	Porsche 4.0 L Flat-6	+17 Laps	367
10	991	909	(Luxembourg) DUWO Racing	(Russia) Andrey Mukovoz (Russia) Sergey Peregudov (Russia) Stanislav Sidoruk	Porsche 991 GT3 II Cup	+17 Laps	367
10	991	909	(Luxembourg) DUWO Racing	(Russia) Andrey Mukovoz (Russia) Sergey Peregudov (Russia) Stanislav Sidoruk	Porsche 4.0 L Flat-6	+17 Laps	367
11	991	955	(Romania) Willi Motorsport by Ebimotors	(Italy) Fabrizio Broggi (Italy) Sabino de Castro (Romania) Sergiu Nicolae	Porsche 991 GT3 II Cup	+19 Laps	365
11	991	955	(Romania) Willi Motorsport by Ebimotors	(Italy) Fabrizio Broggi (Italy) Sabino de Castro (Romania) Sergiu Nicolae	Porsche 4.0 L Flat-6	+19 Laps	365
12	**GTX**	**719**	**(Germany) 9und11 Racing**	**(Germany) Georg Goder (Germany) Ralf Oehme (Germany) Tim Scheerbrarth (Germany) Martin Schlüter**	**Porsche 991 GT3 Cup MR**	**+23 Laps**	**361**
12	**GTX**	**719**	**(Germany) 9und11 Racing**	**(Germany) Georg Goder (Germany) Ralf Oehme (Germany) Tim Scheerbrarth (Germany) Martin Schlüter**	**Porsche 4.0 L Flat-6**	**+23 Laps**	**361**
13	**TCR**	**1**	**(Switzerland) Autorama Motorsport by Wolf-Power Racing**	**(Norway) Emil Heyerdahl (Austria) Constantin Kletzer (Switzerland) Jasmin Preisig**	**Volkswagen Golf GTI TCR**	**+34 Laps**	**350**
13	**TCR**	**1**	**(Switzerland) Autorama Motorsport by Wolf-Power Racing**	**(Norway) Emil Heyerdahl (Austria) Constantin Kletzer (Switzerland) Jasmin Preisig**	**Volkswagen 2.0 L I4**	**+34 Laps**	**350**
14	TCR	188	(Belgium) AC Motorsport	(Belgium) Mathieu Detr (France) Stéphane Perrin (Germany) Stefan Wieninger	Audi RS 3 LMS TCR	+34 Laps	350
14	TCR	188	(Belgium) AC Motorsport	(Belgium) Mathieu Detr (France) Stéphane Perrin (Germany) Stefan Wieninger	Volkswagen 2.0 L I4	+34 Laps	350
15	**TCX**	**278**	**(United Kingdom) CWS Engineering**	**(United States) Jean-Francois Brunot (United Kingdom) Colin White**	**Ginetta G55 Supercup**	**+38 Laps**	**346**
15	**TCX**	**278**	**(United Kingdom) CWS Engineering**	**(United States) Jean-Francois Brunot (United Kingdom) Colin White**	**Ford Cyclone 3.7 L V6**	**+38 Laps**	**346**
16	991	920	(Switzerland) Stadler Motorsport	(Switzerland) Enzo Calderari (Switzerland) Paul Kasper (Switzerland) Philipe Menotti (Switzerland) Ramon Werner	Porsche 991 GT3 II Cup	+39 Laps	345
16	991	920	(Switzerland) Stadler Motorsport	(Switzerland) Enzo Calderari (Switzerland) Paul Kasper (Switzerland) Philipe Menotti (Switzerland) Ramon Werner	Porsche 4.0 L Flat-6	+39 Laps	345
17	**GT4**	**401**	**(Germany) PROsport Performance AMR**	**(Belgium) Rodrigue Gillion (Belgium) Kurt Hensen (Belgium) Nico Verdonck**	**Aston Martin Vantage AMR GT4**	**+40 Laps**	**344**
17	**GT4**	**401**	**(Germany) PROsport Performance AMR**	**(Belgium) Rodrigue Gillion (Belgium) Kurt Hensen (Belgium) Nico Verdonck**	**Aston Martin 4.0 L Turbo V8**	**+40 Laps**	**344**
18	TCX	210	(Netherlands) Munckhof Racing	(Netherlands) Marco Poland (Netherlands) Eric van den Munckhof	BMW M4 GTR	+43 Laps	341
18	TCX	210	(Netherlands) Munckhof Racing	(Netherlands) Marco Poland (Netherlands) Eric van den Munckhof	BMW B58B30 3.0 L Twin-Turbo I6	+43 Laps	341
19	GTX	724	(Germany) Reiter Engineering	(Austria) Eike Angermayr (United States) Nicolai Elghanayan (Austria) Horst Felbermayr Jr. (Norway) Mads Siljehaug	KTM X-Bow GTX Concept	+46 Laps	338
19	GTX	724	(Germany) Reiter Engineering	(Austria) Eike Angermayr (United States) Nicolai Elghanayan (Austria) Horst Felbermayr Jr. (Norway) Mads Siljehaug	Audi 2.5 L I5	+46 Laps	338
20	TCX	211	(Switzerland) Autorama Motorsport	(Switzerland) Armando Stanco (Switzerland) Dario Stanco (Switzerland) Luigi Stanco	SEAT León Cup Racer	+52 Laps	332
20	TCX	211	(Switzerland) Autorama Motorsport	(Switzerland) Armando Stanco (Switzerland) Dario Stanco (Switzerland) Luigi Stanco	Volkswagen 2.0 L I4	+52 Laps	332
21	TCR	105	(Lithuania) GSR Motorsport	(Lithuania) Ernesta Globytė (Lithuania) Rokas Kvedaras (Lithuania) Rolandas Salys (Lithuania) Rimvydas Savickas	Volkswagen Golf GTI TCR	+52 Laps	332
21	TCR	105	(Lithuania) GSR Motorsport	(Lithuania) Ernesta Globytė (Lithuania) Rokas Kvedaras (Lithuania) Rolandas Salys (Lithuania) Rimvydas Savickas	Volkswagen 2.0 L I4	+52 Laps	332
22	GTX	701	(France) Vortex V8	(France) Arnaud Gomez (France) Philippe Bonnel (France) Bastien Gouret (Switzerland) Nicolas Nobs	Vortex 1.0 GTX	+53 Laps	331
22	GTX	701	(France) Vortex V8	(France) Arnaud Gomez (France) Philippe Bonnel (France) Bastien Gouret (Switzerland) Nicolas Nobs	Chevrolet 6.2 L V8	+53 Laps	331
23	GTX	999	(Netherlands) Red Camel-Jordans.nl	(Netherlands) Ivo Breukers (Netherlands) Luc Breukers (Netherlands) Rik Breukers	Porsche 992 GT3 Cup	+79 Laps	305
23	GTX	999	(Netherlands) Red Camel-Jordans.nl	(Netherlands) Ivo Breukers (Netherlands) Luc Breukers (Netherlands) Rik Breukers	Porsche 4.0 L Flat-6	+79 Laps	305
24 DNF	GT3	92	(Germany) Herberth Motorsport	(Germany) "Bobby Gonzales" (Germany) Jürgen Häring (Germany) Tim Müller (Germany) Alfred Renauer	Ferrari 488 GT3 Evo 2020	+86 Laps	298
24 DNF	GT3	92	(Germany) Herberth Motorsport	(Germany) "Bobby Gonzales" (Germany) Jürgen Häring (Germany) Tim Müller (Germany) Alfred Renauer	Ferrari 3.9 L Twin-Turbo V8	+86 Laps	298
25 DNF	GT4	438	(Canada) ST Racing	(United States) Chandler Hull (United States) Jon Miller (Canada) Samantha Tan (Canada) Nick Wittmer	BMW M4 GT4	+87 Laps	297
25 DNF	GT4	438	(Canada) ST Racing	(United States) Chandler Hull (United States) Jon Miller (Canada) Samantha Tan (Canada) Nick Wittmer	BMW N55 3.0 L Twin-Turbo I6	+87 Laps	297
26	991	989	(Germany) MRS GT-Racing	(United Arab Emirates) Saif Alameri (Russia) Nikolai Gadetsky (Netherlands) Thierry Vermeulen	Porsche 991 GT3 Cup II	+91 Laps	293
26	991	989	(Germany) MRS GT-Racing	(United Arab Emirates) Saif Alameri (Russia) Nikolai Gadetsky (Netherlands) Thierry Vermeulen	Porsche 4.0 L Flat-6	+91 Laps	293
27	TCR	112	(Switzerland) Autorama Motorsport by Wolf-Power Racing	(Switzerland) Christophe Hurni (United Kingdom) Rhys Lloyd (Switzerland) Christoph Lenz (Switzerland) Yannick Mettler	Volkswagen Golf GTI TCR	+133 Laps	251
27	TCR	112	(Switzerland) Autorama Motorsport by Wolf-Power Racing	(Switzerland) Christophe Hurni (United Kingdom) Rhys Lloyd (Switzerland) Christoph Lenz (Switzerland) Yannick Mettler	Volkswagen 2.0 L I4	+133 Laps	251
28	GT3	58	(Italy) MP Racing	(Italy) Corinna Gostner (Italy) Manuela Gostner (Italy) Thomas Gostner	Mercedes-AMG GT3 Evo	+148 Laps	236
28	GT3	58	(Italy) MP Racing	(Italy) Corinna Gostner (Italy) Manuela Gostner (Italy) Thomas Gostner	Mercedes-AMG M159 6.2 L V8	+148 Laps	236
DNF	TCR	131	(Switzerland) TOPCAR Sport	(Switzerland) Fabian Danz (Switzerland) Ronny Jost (Switzerland) Ruedi Jost	CUPRA León TCR	Retired	180
DNF	TCR	131	(Switzerland) TOPCAR Sport	(Switzerland) Fabian Danz (Switzerland) Ronny Jost (Switzerland) Ruedi Jost	Volkswagen 2.0 L I4	Retired	180
DNF	GTX	725	(Germany) Reiter Engineering	(Netherlands) Peter Kox (Netherlands) Nico Pronk (Netherlands) Dennis Retera	KTM X-Bow GTX Concept	Mechanical	78
DNF	GTX	725	(Germany) Reiter Engineering	(Netherlands) Peter Kox (Netherlands) Nico Pronk (Netherlands) Dennis Retera	Audi 2.5 L I5	Mechanical	78

== Footnotes ==
24H GT Series
Previous race: 12 Hours of Circuit Paul Ricard	2021 season	Next race: 24 Hours of Barcelona

24H TCE Series
Previous race: 12 Hours of Circuit Paul Ricard	2021 season	Next race: 24 Hours of Barcelona
