= 2021 12 Hours of Circuit Paul Ricard =

The layout of the Circuit Paul Ricard.

The 2021 Hankook 12 Hours of Circuit Paul Ricard was the inaugural running of the 12 Hours of Circuit Paul Ricard which took place on 24 April 2021. It was also the third round of the 2021 24H GT and TCE Series and the fourth 24H Series event at the circuit, having held three 24-hour races from 2015 to 2017.

== Schedule ==
Date	Time (local: CEST)	Event	Distance
Friday, 23 April	12:00 - 13:30	Practice (Both classes)	90 mins
Friday, 23 April	15:00 - 15:30	Qualifying - TCE	30 Mins
Friday, 23 April	16:00 - 16:30	Qualifying - GT	30 Mins
Friday, 23 April	20:00 - 22:00	Night practice	2 Hours
Saturday, 24 April	10:00 - 22:00	Race	12 Hours

== Entry list ==
25 cars were entered into the event; 17 GT cars and 8 TCEs. A new addition was SPS automotive performance with a Mercedes-AMG GT3 Evo. After switching to TCX in the previous round at Mugello, Speed Lover entered two Porsches, the newest Porsche Cup car, the Porsche 992 GT3 Cup in GTX and a Porsche 991 GT3 Cup II in the 991 class. Another new car for the 2021 season was the Ligier JS2 R of French team Nordschleife Racing, competing in the TCX class.

Team	Car	Engine	No.	Drivers
GT3 (8 entries)
(Switzerland) Kessel Racing	Ferrari 488 GT3 Evo (2020)	Ferrari 3.9 L Twin-Turbo V8	8	(Italy) Nicola Cadei (Italy) Alessandro Cutrera (Italy) Leonardo-Maria del Vecchio (Italy) Marco Frezza (Italy) Marco Talarico
(Czech Republic) MiddleCap racing with Scuderia Praha	Ferrari 488 GT3	Ferrari 3.9 L Twin-Turbo V8	11	(Czech Republic) Josef Král (Slovakia) Matúš Výboh (Slovakia) Miroslav Výboh
(Germany) Rutronik Racing by TECE	Audi R8 LMS Evo	Audi 5.2 L V10	18	(Austria) Michael Doppelmayr (Germany) Elia Erhart (Germany) Swen Herberger (Germany) Pierre Kaffer
(Germany) SPS automotive performance	Mercedes-AMG GT3 Evo	Mercedes-AMG M159 6.2 L V8	20	(Germany) Steffen Görig (Germany) Christian Hook (Germany) Valentin Pierburg
(Italy) MP Racing	Mercedes-AMG GT3 Evo	Mercedes-AMG M159 6.2 L V8	58	(Italy) Corinna Gostner (Italy) Manuela Gostner (Italy) Thomas Gostner
(Germany) Car Collection Motorsport	Audi R8 LMS Evo	Audi 5.2 L V10	88	(Netherlands) Milan Dontje (Germany) Tim Müller (Belgium) Pierre-Yves Paque (Poland) Robin Rogalski
(Germany) Herberth Motorsport	Porsche 911 GT3 R (2019)	Porsche 4.0 L Flat-6	91	(Switzerland) Daniel Allemann (Germany) Ralf Bohn (Germany) Alfred Renauer (Germany) Robert Renauer
(Germany) Herberth Motorsport	Porsche 911 GT3 R (2019)	Porsche 4.0 L Flat-6	92	(Germany) Stefan Aust (Germany) "Bobby Gonzales" (Germany) Jürgen Häring (Germany) Marco Seefried
GTX (4 entries)
(France) Vortex V8	Vortex 1.0 GTX	Chevrolet 6.2 L V8	701	(France) Olivier Gomez (France) Bastien Gouret (France) Philippe Gruau
(France) Vortex V8	Vortex 1.0 GTX	Chevrolet 6.2 L V8	712	(France) Philippe Bonnel (France) Pierre Fontaine (Switzerland) Nicolas Nobs
(Germany) Reiter Engineering	KTM X-Bow GTX Concept	Audi 2.5 L I5	724	(Austria) Eike Angermayr (United States) Nicolai Elghanayan (Austria) Horst Felbermayr Jr. (Norway) Mads Siljehaug
(Belgium) Speed Lover	Porsche 992 GT3 Cup	Porsche 4.0 L Flat-6	979	(Belgium) Gilles Smits (Belgium) Jaxon Verhoeven (Netherlands) Jean-Pierre Verhoeven
991 (3 entries)
(Luxembourg) DUWO Racing	Porsche 991 GT3 Cup II	Porsche 4.0 L Flat-6	909	(Russia) Andrey Mukovoz (Russia) Sergey Peregudov (Russia) Stanislav Sidoruk
(France) Porsche Lorient Racing	Porsche 991 GT3 Cup II	Porsche 4.0 L Flat-6	911	(France) Lionel Amrouche (France) Frédéric Ancel (France) Frederic Lelievre (France) Philippe Polette
(Belgium) Speed Lover	Porsche 991 GT3 Cup II	Porsche 4.0 L Flat-6	978	(United States) Dominique Bastien (Belgium) Olivier Dons (France) Eric Mouez
GT4 (2 entries)
(Germany) PROsport Performance AMR	Aston Martin Vantage AMR GT4	Aston Martin 4.0 L Turbo V8	401	(Belgium) Rodrigue Gillion (Belgium) Kurt Hensen (Belgium) Nico Verdonck
(Canada) ST Racing	BMW M4 GT4	BMW N55 3.0 L Twin-Turbo I6	438	(United States) Chandler Hull (United States) Jon Miller (Canada) Samantha Tan
TCR (6 entries)
(Switzerland) Autorama Motorsport by Wolf-Power Racing	Volkswagen Golf GTI TCR	Volkswagen 2.0 L I4	1	(Norway) Emil Heyerdahl (Austria) Constantin Kletzer (Switzerland) Yannick Mettler (Switzerland) Jérôme Ogay
(Switzerland) Autorama Motorsport by Wolf-Power Racing	Volkswagen Golf GTI TCR	Volkswagen 2.0 L I4	112	(Switzerland) Fabian Danz (United Kingdom) Rhys Lloyd (Germany) Marlon Menden (Switzerland) Yannick Mettler
(Netherlands) Red Camel-Jordans.nl	CUPRA León TCR	Volkswagen 2.0 L I4	101	(Netherlands) Ivo Breukers (Netherlands) Luc Breukers (Netherlands) Rik Breukers
(Spain) RC2 Junior Team by Cabra Racing	Cupra León Competición TCR	Volkswagen 2.0 L I4	108	(Spain) Felipe Fernández (Spain) Rubén Fernández (Spain) Victor Fernández
(Spain) Tictap Totcar Sport	CUPRA León TCR	Volkswagen 2.0 L I4	123	(Spain) Jorge Belloc Diaz (Spain) Jorge Belloc Ruiz (Spain) Álvaro Rodríguez Sastre
(Belgium) AC Motorsport	Audi RS 3 LMS TCR	Volkswagen 2.0 L I4	188	(Belgium) David Dermont (Belgium) Mathieu Detry (France) Stéphane Perrin
TCX (2 entries)
(France) Nordschleife Racing	Ligier JS2 R	Ford 3.7 L V6	226	(France) Thierry Chkondali (France) Guillaume Roman (France) Daniel Waszczinski
(United Kingdom) CWS Engineering	Ginetta G55 Supercup	Ford Cyclone 3.7 L V6	278	(United States) Jean-Francois Brunot (United Kingdom) JM Littman (United Kingdom) Colin White

== Qualifying ==
=== TCE ===
Series-regulars Autorama Motorsport by Wolf-Power Racing and AC Motorsport fought throughout the session for TCE pole position. The #112 car came out on top with Yannick Mettler setting the fastest time (2:15.801) with five and a half minutes to go, only six tenths ahead of the #188 Audi (2:15.868) followed by the sister Autorama car in third (2:16.079). Two Cupras run by Spanish teams Tictap Totcar Sport and RC2 Junior Team by Cabra Racing placed fourth (2:16.133) and fifth (2:16.212) respectively, with the TCR class being rounded out by the Red Camel-Jordans.nl Cupra (2:16.414). The winless CWS Engineering team scored pole position for a second time (2:16.646) almost half a second clear of the second-placed Nordschleife Racing Ligier (2:17.065).

==== Results ====
Fastest in class in bold.

Pos.	Class	No.	Team	Time
1	**TCR**	**112**	**(Switzerland) Autorama Motorsport by Wolf-Power Racing**	**2:15.801**
2	TCR	188	(Belgium) AC Motorsport	2:15.868
3	TCR	1	(Switzerland) Autorama Motorsport by Wolf-Power Racing	2:16.079
4	TCR	123	(Spain) Tictap Totcar Sport	2:16.133
5	TCR	108	(Spain) RC2 Junior Team by Cabra Racing	2:16.212
6	TCR	101	(Netherlands) Red Camel-Jordans.nl	2:16.414
7	**TCX**	**278**	**(United Kingdom) CWS Engineering**	**2:16.646**
8	TCX	226	(France) Nordschleife Racing	2:17.065

=== GT ===
All but one car took part in the qualifying session for GT cars. By the halfway point, the #11 MiddleCap racing with Scuderia Praha Ferrari had set multiple fast times in the 2:02s, with Herberth Motorsport challenging for the pole with both cars battling with the Ferrari. With eight minutes to go, the #701 Vortex V8 pulled off the track on the Mistral Straight, Olivier Gomez parking the car in a safe place, allowing the session to continue. Five minutes to go, Josef Král set the fastest lap time of the session (2:02.303), putting the car on pole position, ahead of the #91 (2:02.435) and #92 (2:02.451) Porsches, despite spinning on the next lap. Reiter Engineering's KTM X-Bow GTX Concept claimed the GTX pole (2:06.774) ahead of the #701 Vortex (2:07.187) and the #979 Porsche (2:08.280). Home team Porsche Lorient Racing (2:09.349) claimed the 991 class pole position, over a second clear of both DUWO Racing (2:10.763) and Speed Lover (2:13.595). The only GT4 car that participated in the session was the #438 ST Racing BMW M4 GT4 (2:15.875), the Aston Martin Vantage AMR GT4 of PROsport Performance AMR unable to even leave the garage; a crash in free practice spoiling their chances to qualify but having a spare car on hand meant they could contest the race on Saturday.

==== Results ====
Fastest in class in bold.

Pos.	Class	No.	Team	Time
1	**GT3**	**11**	**(Czech Republic) MiddleCap racing with Scuderia Praha**	**2:02.303**
2	GT3	91	(Germany) Herberth Motorsport	2:02.435
3	GT3	92	(Germany) Herberth Motorsport	2:02.451
4	GT3	8	(Switzerland) Kessel Racing	2:02.992
5	GT3	18	(Germany) Rutronik Racing by TECE	2:03.162
6	GT3	58	(Italy) MP Racing	2:04.242
7	GT3	88	(Germany) Car Collection Motorsport	2:04.383
8	GT3	20	(Germany) SPS automotive performance	2:04.856
9	**GTX**	**724**	**(Germany) Reiter Engineering**	**2:06.774**
10	GTX	701	(France) Vortex V8	2:07.187
11	GTX	979	(Belgium) Speed Lover	2:08.280
12	**991**	**911**	**(France) Porsche Lorient Racing**	**2:09.349**
13	GTX	712	(France) Vortex V8	2:10.312
14	991	909	(Luxembourg) DUWO Racing	2:10.763
15	991	978	(Belgium) Speed Lover	2:13.595
16	**GT4**	**438**	**(Canada) ST Racing**	**2:15.875**
17	GT4	401	(Germany) PROsport Performance AMR	No time (Note: The No. 401 PROsport Performance AMR was damaged in free practice and the team opted to use a spare car but could not get it ready to set a time in qualifying.)

== Race ==
=== Results ===
Class winner in bold.

Pos	Class	No.	Team	Drivers	Chassis	Time/Reason	Laps
Pos	Class	No.	Team	Drivers	Engine	Time/Reason	Laps
1	**GT3**	**91**	**(Germany) Herberth Motorsport**	**(Switzerland) Daniel Allemann (Germany) Ralf Bohn (Germany) Alfred Renauer (Germany) Robert Renauer**	**Porsche 911 GT3 R (2019)**	**12:00:15.447**	**315**
1	**GT3**	**91**	**(Germany) Herberth Motorsport**	**(Switzerland) Daniel Allemann (Germany) Ralf Bohn (Germany) Alfred Renauer (Germany) Robert Renauer**	**Porsche 4.0 L Flat-6**	**12:00:15.447**	**315**
2	GT3	11	(Czech Republic) MiddleCap racing with Scuderia Praha	(Czech Republic) Josef Král (Slovakia) Matúš Výboh (Slovakia) Miroslav Výboh	Ferrari 488 GT3	+1 Lap	314
2	GT3	11	(Czech Republic) MiddleCap racing with Scuderia Praha	(Czech Republic) Josef Král (Slovakia) Matúš Výboh (Slovakia) Miroslav Výboh	Ferrari 3.9 L Twin-Turbo V8	+1 Lap	314
3	GT3	18	(Germany) Rutronik Racing by TECE	(Austria) Michael Doppelmayr (Germany) Elia Erhart (Germany) Swen Herberger (Germany) Pierre Kaffer	Audi R8 LMS Evo	+4 Laps	311
3	GT3	18	(Germany) Rutronik Racing by TECE	(Austria) Michael Doppelmayr (Germany) Elia Erhart (Germany) Swen Herberger (Germany) Pierre Kaffer	Audi 5.2 L V10	+4 Laps	311
4	GT3	34	(Germany) Car Collection Motorsport	(Netherlands) Milan Dontje (Germany) Tim Müller (Belgium) Pierre-Yves Paque (Poland) Robin Rogalski	Audi R8 LMS Evo	+7 Laps	308
4	GT3	34	(Germany) Car Collection Motorsport	(Netherlands) Milan Dontje (Germany) Tim Müller (Belgium) Pierre-Yves Paque (Poland) Robin Rogalski	Audi 5.2 L V10	+7 Laps	308
5	**GTX**	**724**	**(Germany) Reiter Engineering**	**(Austria) Eike Angermayr (United States) Nicolai Elghanayan (Austria) Horst Felbermayr Jr. (Norway) Mads Siljehaug**	**KTM X-Bow GTX Concept**	**+9 Laps**	**306**
5	**GTX**	**724**	**(Germany) Reiter Engineering**	**(Austria) Eike Angermayr (United States) Nicolai Elghanayan (Austria) Horst Felbermayr Jr. (Norway) Mads Siljehaug**	**Audi 2.5 L I5**	**+9 Laps**	**306**
6	GT3	20	(Germany) SPS automotive performance	(Germany) Steffen Görig (Germany) Christian Hook (Germany) Valentin Pierburg	Mercedes-AMG GT3 Evo	+10 Laps	305
6	GT3	20	(Germany) SPS automotive performance	(Germany) Steffen Görig (Germany) Christian Hook (Germany) Valentin Pierburg	Mercedes-AMG M159 6.2 L V8	+10 Laps	305
7	**991**	**911**	**(France) Porsche Lorient Racing**	**(France) Lionel Amrouche (France) Frédéric Ancel (France) Frederic Lelievre (France) Philippe Polette**	**Porsche 991 GT3 II Cup**	**+21 Laps**	**294**
7	**991**	**911**	**(France) Porsche Lorient Racing**	**(France) Lionel Amrouche (France) Frédéric Ancel (France) Frederic Lelievre (France) Philippe Polette**	**Porsche 4.0 L Flat-6**	**+21 Laps**	**294**
8	GTX	979	(Belgium) Speed Lover	(Belgium) Gilles Smits (Belgium) Jaxon Verhoeven (Netherlands) Jean-Pierre Verhoeven	Porsche 992 GT3 Cup	+23 Laps	292
8	GTX	979	(Belgium) Speed Lover	(Belgium) Gilles Smits (Belgium) Jaxon Verhoeven (Netherlands) Jean-Pierre Verhoeven	Porsche 4.0 L Flat-6	+23 Laps	292
9	**TCR**	**1**	**(Switzerland) Autorama Motorsport by Wolf-Power Racing**	**(Norway) Emil Heyerdahl (Austria) Constantin Kletzer (Switzerland) Yannick Mettler (Switzerland) Jérôme Ogay**	**Volkswagen Golf GTI TCR**	**+28 Laps**	**287**
9	**TCR**	**1**	**(Switzerland) Autorama Motorsport by Wolf-Power Racing**	**(Norway) Emil Heyerdahl (Austria) Constantin Kletzer (Switzerland) Yannick Mettler (Switzerland) Jérôme Ogay**	**Volkswagen 2.0 L I4**	**+28 Laps**	**287**
10	TCR	112	(Switzerland) Autorama Motorsport by Wolf-Power Racing	(Switzerland) Fabian Danz (United Kingdom) Rhys Lloyd (Germany) Marlon Menden (Switzerland) Yannick Mettler	Volkswagen Golf GTI TCR	+29 Laps	286
10	TCR	112	(Switzerland) Autorama Motorsport by Wolf-Power Racing	(Switzerland) Fabian Danz (United Kingdom) Rhys Lloyd (Germany) Marlon Menden (Switzerland) Yannick Mettler	Volkswagen 2.0 L I4	+29 Laps	286
11	GT3	58	(Italy) MP Racing	(Italy) Corinna Gostner (Italy) Manuela Gostner (Italy) Thomas Gostner	Mercedes-AMG GT3 Evo	+30 Laps	285
11	GT3	58	(Italy) MP Racing	(Italy) Corinna Gostner (Italy) Manuela Gostner (Italy) Thomas Gostner	Mercedes-AMG M159 6.2 L V8	+30 Laps	285
12	TCR	188	(Belgium) AC Motorsport	(Belgium) David Dermont (Belgium) Mathieu Detry (France) Stéphane Perrin	Audi RS 3 LMS TCR	+32 Laps	283
12	TCR	188	(Belgium) AC Motorsport	(Belgium) David Dermont (Belgium) Mathieu Detry (France) Stéphane Perrin	Volkswagen 2.0 L I4	+32 Laps	283
13	TCR	123	(Spain) Tictap Totcar Sport	(Spain) Jorge Belloc Diaz (Spain) Jorge Belloc Ruiz (Spain) Álvaro Rodríguez Sastre	CUPRA León TCR	+35 Laps	280
13	TCR	123	(Spain) Tictap Totcar Sport	(Spain) Jorge Belloc Diaz (Spain) Jorge Belloc Ruiz (Spain) Álvaro Rodríguez Sastre	Volkswagen 2.0 L I4	+35 Laps	280
14	991	909	(Luxembourg) DUWO Racing	(Russia) Andrey Mukovoz (Russia) Sergey Peregudov (Russia) Stanislav Sidoruk	Porsche 991 GT3 II Cup	+47 Laps	268
14	991	909	(Luxembourg) DUWO Racing	(Russia) Andrey Mukovoz (Russia) Sergey Peregudov (Russia) Stanislav Sidoruk	Porsche 4.0 L Flat-6	+47 Laps	268
15	GTX	701	(France) Vortex V8	(France) Olivier Gomez (France) Bastien Gouret (France) Philippe Gruau	Vortex 1.0 GTX	+66 Laps	249
15	GTX	701	(France) Vortex V8	(France) Olivier Gomez (France) Bastien Gouret (France) Philippe Gruau	Chevrolet 6.2 L V8	+66 Laps	249
16	TCX	226	(France) Nordschleife Racing	(France) Thierry Chkondali (France) Guillaume Roman (France) Daniel Waszczinski	Ligier JS2 R	+78 Laps	237
16	TCX	226	(France) Nordschleife Racing	(France) Thierry Chkondali (France) Guillaume Roman (France) Daniel Waszczinski	Ford 3.7 L V6	+78 Laps	237
17	991	978	(Belgium) Speed Lover	(United States) Dominique Bastien (Belgium) Olivier Dons (France) Eric Mouez	Porsche 991 GT3 II Cup	+85 Laps	230
17	991	978	(Belgium) Speed Lover	(United States) Dominique Bastien (Belgium) Olivier Dons (France) Eric Mouez	Porsche 4.0 L Flat-6	+85 Laps	230
18	TCX	278	(United Kingdom) CWS Engineering	(United States) Jean-Francois Brunot (United Kingdom) JM Littman (United Kingdom) Colin White	Ginetta G55 Supercup	+88 Laps	227
18	TCX	278	(United Kingdom) CWS Engineering	(United States) Jean-Francois Brunot (United Kingdom) JM Littman (United Kingdom) Colin White	Ford Cyclone 3.7 L V6	+88 Laps	227
19	GTX	712	(France) Vortex V8	(France) Philippe Bonnel (France) Pierre Fontaine (Switzerland) Nicolas Nobs	Vortex 1.0 GTX	+96 Laps	219
19	GTX	712	(France) Vortex V8	(France) Philippe Bonnel (France) Pierre Fontaine (Switzerland) Nicolas Nobs	Chevrolet 6.2 L V8	+96 Laps	219
20	GT4	401	(Germany) PROsport Performance AMR	(Belgium) Rodrigue Gillion (Belgium) Kurt Hensen (Belgium) Nico Verdonck	Aston Martin Vantage AMR GT4	+111 Laps	204
20	GT4	401	(Germany) PROsport Performance AMR	(Belgium) Rodrigue Gillion (Belgium) Kurt Hensen (Belgium) Nico Verdonck	Aston Martin 4.0 L Turbo V8	+111 Laps	204
DNF	TCR	108	(Spain) RC2 Junior Team by Cabra Racing	(Spain) Felipe Fernández (Spain) Rubén Fernández (Spain) Victor Fernández	Cupra León Competición TCR	Contact	108
DNF	TCR	108	(Spain) RC2 Junior Team by Cabra Racing	(Spain) Felipe Fernández (Spain) Rubén Fernández (Spain) Victor Fernández	Volkswagen 2.0 L I4	Contact	108
DNF	TCR	101	(Netherlands) Red Camel-Jordans.nl	(Netherlands) Ivo Breukers (Netherlands) Luc Breukers (Netherlands) Rik Breukers	CUPRA León TCR	Engine	98
DNF	TCR	101	(Netherlands) Red Camel-Jordans.nl	(Netherlands) Ivo Breukers (Netherlands) Luc Breukers (Netherlands) Rik Breukers	Volkswagen 2.0 L I4	Engine	98
DNF	GT4	438	(Canada) ST Racing	(United States) Chandler Hull (United States) Jon Miller (Canada) Samantha Tan	BMW M4 GT4	Headgasket	59
DNF	GT4	438	(Canada) ST Racing	(United States) Chandler Hull (United States) Jon Miller (Canada) Samantha Tan	BMW N55 3.0 L Twin-Turbo I6	Headgasket	59
DNF	GT3	92	(Germany) Herberth Motorsport	(Germany) Stefan Aust (Germany) "Bobby Gonzales" (Germany) Jürgen Häring (Germany) Marco Seefried	Porsche 911 GT3 R (2019)	Damage	53
DNF	GT3	92	(Germany) Herberth Motorsport	(Germany) Stefan Aust (Germany) "Bobby Gonzales" (Germany) Jürgen Häring (Germany) Marco Seefried	Porsche 4.0 L Flat-6	Damage	53
DNF	GT3	8	(Switzerland) Kessel Racing	(Italy) Nicola Cadei (Italy) Alessandro Cutrera (Italy) Leonardo-Maria del Vecchio (Italy) Marco Frezza (Italy) Marco Talarico	Ferrari 488 GT3 Evo (2019)	Collision	0
DNF	GT3	8	(Switzerland) Kessel Racing	(Italy) Nicola Cadei (Italy) Alessandro Cutrera (Italy) Leonardo-Maria del Vecchio (Italy) Marco Frezza (Italy) Marco Talarico	Ferrari 3.9 L Twin-Turbo V8	Collision	0

== Footnotes ==
24H GT Series
Previous race: 12 Hours of Mugello	2021 season	Next race: 12 Hours of Hockenheimring

24H TCE Series
Previous race: 12 Hours of Mugello	2021 season	Next race: 12 Hours of Hockenheimring
