= 2021 24H TCE Series =

Car racing series

The 2021 24H Touring Car Endurance Series powered by Hankook was the sixth season of the Touring Car Endurance Series (TCES). Creventic was the organiser and promoter of the series. The races were contested with TCR Touring Cars, TCX cars and TC cars.

== Calendar ==
Round	Event	Circuit	Date
1	Dubai 24 Hour	Dubai Autodrome, Dubai, United Arab Emirates	14–16 January
2	12 Hours of Mugello	Mugello Circuit, Scarperia e San Piero, Italy	26–27 March
3	12 Hours of Circuit Paul Ricard	Circuit Paul Ricard, Le Castellet, France	23–24 April
4	12 Hours of Hockenheimring	Hockenheimring, Hockenheim, Germany	22–23 May
5	24 Hours of Barcelona	Circuit de Barcelona-Catalunya, Montmeló, Spain	3–5 September
6	12 Hours of Hungary	Hungaroring, Mogyoród, Hungary	2–3 October
7	24 Hours of Sebring	Sebring International Raceway, Sebring, Florida, United States	20–21 November
Cancelled
Event		Circuit	Original Date
24 Hours of Portimão		Algarve International Circuit, Portimão, Portugal	16–18 July
Coppa Florio 12 Hours of Sicily		Autodromo di Pergusa, Pergusa, Italy	2–3 October

== Entry list ==
Team	Car	Engine	No.	Drivers	Rounds
TCR
(Switzerland) Autorama Motorsport by Wolf-Power Racing	Volkswagen Golf GTI TCR	Volkswagen 2.0 L I4	1	(Austria) Constantin Kletzer	All
(Switzerland) Autorama Motorsport by Wolf-Power Racing	Volkswagen Golf GTI TCR	Volkswagen 2.0 L I4	1	(Norway) Emil Heyerdahl	All
(Switzerland) Autorama Motorsport by Wolf-Power Racing	Volkswagen Golf GTI TCR	Volkswagen 2.0 L I4	1	(Switzerland) Yannick Mettler	1, 3
(Switzerland) Autorama Motorsport by Wolf-Power Racing	Volkswagen Golf GTI TCR	Volkswagen 2.0 L I4	1	(Switzerland) Jérôme Ogay	1, 3
(Switzerland) Autorama Motorsport by Wolf-Power Racing	Volkswagen Golf GTI TCR	Volkswagen 2.0 L I4	1	(Germany) Marlon Menden	1
(Switzerland) Autorama Motorsport by Wolf-Power Racing	Volkswagen Golf GTI TCR	Volkswagen 2.0 L I4	1	(Germany) Marcus Menden	2
(Switzerland) Autorama Motorsport by Wolf-Power Racing	Volkswagen Golf GTI TCR	Volkswagen 2.0 L I4	1	(Switzerland) Walter Reho	2
(Switzerland) Autorama Motorsport by Wolf-Power Racing	Volkswagen Golf GTI TCR	Volkswagen 2.0 L I4	1	(Switzerland) Jasmin Preisig	4–5, 7
(Switzerland) Autorama Motorsport by Wolf-Power Racing	Volkswagen Golf GTI TCR	Volkswagen 2.0 L I4	1	(Italy) Roberto Ferri	5
(Switzerland) Autorama Motorsport by Wolf-Power Racing	Volkswagen Golf GTI TCR	Volkswagen 2.0 L I4	1	(Switzerland) Fabian Danz	6–7
(Switzerland) Autorama Motorsport by Wolf-Power Racing	Volkswagen Golf GTI TCR	Volkswagen 2.0 L I4	1	(Poland) Lukasz Stolarcyk	6
(Switzerland) Autorama Motorsport by Wolf-Power Racing	Volkswagen Golf GTI TCR	Volkswagen 2.0 L I4	1	(Switzerland) Miklas Born	7
(Switzerland) Autorama Motorsport by Wolf-Power Racing	Volkswagen Golf GTI TCR	Volkswagen 2.0 L I4	112	(Switzerland) Jasmin Preisig	1–2, 6
(Switzerland) Autorama Motorsport by Wolf-Power Racing	Volkswagen Golf GTI TCR	Volkswagen 2.0 L I4	112	(Switzerland) Yannick Mettler	1, 3–4
(Switzerland) Autorama Motorsport by Wolf-Power Racing	Volkswagen Golf GTI TCR	Volkswagen 2.0 L I4	112	(Switzerland) Miklas Born	1, 7
(Switzerland) Autorama Motorsport by Wolf-Power Racing	Volkswagen Golf GTI TCR	Volkswagen 2.0 L I4	112	(Finland) Kari-Pekka Laaksonen	1, 7
(Switzerland) Autorama Motorsport by Wolf-Power Racing	Volkswagen Golf GTI TCR	Volkswagen 2.0 L I4	112	(Switzerland) Gustavo Xavier	1
(Switzerland) Autorama Motorsport by Wolf-Power Racing	Volkswagen Golf GTI TCR	Volkswagen 2.0 L I4	112	(Italy) Roberto Ferri	2, 7
(Switzerland) Autorama Motorsport by Wolf-Power Racing	Volkswagen Golf GTI TCR	Volkswagen 2.0 L I4	112	(Austria) Constantin Kletzer	2
(Switzerland) Autorama Motorsport by Wolf-Power Racing	Volkswagen Golf GTI TCR	Volkswagen 2.0 L I4	112	(United Kingdom) Rhys Lloyd	3–4
(Switzerland) Autorama Motorsport by Wolf-Power Racing	Volkswagen Golf GTI TCR	Volkswagen 2.0 L I4	112	(Switzerland) Fabian Danz	3, 7
(Switzerland) Autorama Motorsport by Wolf-Power Racing	Volkswagen Golf GTI TCR	Volkswagen 2.0 L I4	112	(Germany) Marlon Menden	3
(Switzerland) Autorama Motorsport by Wolf-Power Racing	Volkswagen Golf GTI TCR	Volkswagen 2.0 L I4	112	(Switzerland) Christophe Hurni	4
(Switzerland) Autorama Motorsport by Wolf-Power Racing	Volkswagen Golf GTI TCR	Volkswagen 2.0 L I4	112	(Switzerland) Christoph Lenz	4, 6
(Switzerland) Autorama Motorsport by Wolf-Power Racing	Volkswagen Golf GTI TCR	Volkswagen 2.0 L I4	112	(Lithuania) Sigitas Ambrazevicius	5
(Switzerland) Autorama Motorsport by Wolf-Power Racing	Volkswagen Golf GTI TCR	Volkswagen 2.0 L I4	112	(Lithuania) Arunas Geciauskas	5
(Switzerland) Autorama Motorsport by Wolf-Power Racing	Volkswagen Golf GTI TCR	Volkswagen 2.0 L I4	112	(Lithuania) Vytenis Gulbinas	5
(Switzerland) Autorama Motorsport by Wolf-Power Racing	Volkswagen Golf GTI TCR	Volkswagen 2.0 L I4	112	(Netherlands) Paul Sieljes	5
(Switzerland) Autorama Motorsport by Wolf-Power Racing	Volkswagen Golf GTI TCR	Volkswagen 2.0 L I4	112	(Norway) Emil Heyerdahl	6
(Switzerland) Autorama Motorsport by Wolf-Power Racing	Volkswagen Golf GTI TCR	Volkswagen 2.0 L I4	112	(Serbia) Miloš Pavlović	6
(Switzerland) Autorama Motorsport by Wolf-Power Racing	Volkswagen Golf GTI TCR	Volkswagen 2.0 L I4	112	(Finland) Antti Buri	7
(Switzerland) Autorama Motorsport by Wolf-Power Racing	Volkswagen Golf GTI TCR	Volkswagen 2.0 L I4	114	(United States) Reto Baumann	1
(Switzerland) Autorama Motorsport by Wolf-Power Racing	Volkswagen Golf GTI TCR	Volkswagen 2.0 L I4	114	(Switzerland) Miklas Born	1
(Switzerland) Autorama Motorsport by Wolf-Power Racing	Volkswagen Golf GTI TCR	Volkswagen 2.0 L I4	114	(United Kingdom) Rhys Lloyd	1
(Switzerland) Autorama Motorsport by Wolf-Power Racing	Volkswagen Golf GTI TCR	Volkswagen 2.0 L I4	114	(Germany) Marcus Menden	1
(Switzerland) Autorama Motorsport by Wolf-Power Racing	Volkswagen Golf GTI TCR	Volkswagen 2.0 L I4	114	(Switzerland) Dario Stanco	1
(Netherlands) Red Camel-Jordans.nl	CUPRA León TCR	Volkswagen 2.0 L I4	101	(Netherlands) Ivo Breukers	1–3
(Netherlands) Red Camel-Jordans.nl	CUPRA León TCR	Volkswagen 2.0 L I4	101	(Germany) Henry Littig	1
(Netherlands) Red Camel-Jordans.nl	CUPRA León TCR	Volkswagen 2.0 L I4	101	(United Kingdom) Steven Liquorish	1
(Netherlands) Red Camel-Jordans.nl	CUPRA León TCR	Volkswagen 2.0 L I4	101	(Netherlands) Willem Meijer	1
(Netherlands) Red Camel-Jordans.nl	CUPRA León TCR	Volkswagen 2.0 L I4	101	(Netherlands) Rik Breukers	2–3
(Netherlands) Red Camel-Jordans.nl	CUPRA León TCR	Volkswagen 2.0 L I4	101	(Netherlands) Luc Breukers	3
(Netherlands) Red Camel-Jordans.nl	Audi RS 3 LMS TCR	Volkswagen 2.0 L I4	101	(Netherlands) Ivo Breukers	6–7
(Netherlands) Red Camel-Jordans.nl	Audi RS 3 LMS TCR	Volkswagen 2.0 L I4	101	(Netherlands) Luc Breukers	6–7
(Netherlands) Red Camel-Jordans.nl	Audi RS 3 LMS TCR	Volkswagen 2.0 L I4	101	(Netherlands) Rik Breukers	6
(Netherlands) Red Camel-Jordans.nl	Audi RS 3 LMS TCR	Volkswagen 2.0 L I4	101	(United States) Dominique Bastien	7
(Netherlands) Red Camel-Jordans.nl	Audi RS 3 LMS TCR	Volkswagen 2.0 L I4	101	(Denmark) Kim Holmgaard	7
(Lithuania) GSR Motorsport	Volkswagen Golf GTI TCR	Volkswagen 2.0 L I4	105	(Lithuania) Ernesta Globytė	4
(Lithuania) GSR Motorsport	Volkswagen Golf GTI TCR	Volkswagen 2.0 L I4	105	(Lithuania) Rokas Kvedaras	4
(Lithuania) GSR Motorsport	Volkswagen Golf GTI TCR	Volkswagen 2.0 L I4	105	(Lithuania) Rolandas Salys	4
(Lithuania) GSR Motorsport	Volkswagen Golf GTI TCR	Volkswagen 2.0 L I4	105	(Lithuania) Rimvydas Savickas	4
(Thailand) BBR - Billionaire Boys Racing	CUPRA León TCR	Volkswagen 2.0 L I4	107	(Thailand) Anusorn Asiralertsiri	1
(Thailand) BBR - Billionaire Boys Racing	CUPRA León TCR	Volkswagen 2.0 L I4	107	(Thailand) Kantadhee Kusiri	1
(Thailand) BBR - Billionaire Boys Racing	CUPRA León TCR	Volkswagen 2.0 L I4	107	(Thailand) Kantasak Kusiri	1
(Thailand) BBR - Billionaire Boys Racing	CUPRA León TCR	Volkswagen 2.0 L I4	107	(Thailand) Chariya Nuya	1
(Thailand) BBR - Billionaire Boys Racing	CUPRA León TCR	Volkswagen 2.0 L I4	107	(Thailand) Tanart Sathienthirakul	1
(Spain) RC2 Junior Team by Cabra Racing	Cupra León Competición TCR	Volkswagen 2.0 L I4	108	(Spain) Felipe Fernández	2–3
(Spain) RC2 Junior Team by Cabra Racing	Cupra León Competición TCR	Volkswagen 2.0 L I4	108	(Spain) Rubén Fernández	2–3
(Spain) RC2 Junior Team by Cabra Racing	Cupra León Competición TCR	Volkswagen 2.0 L I4	108	(Spain) Victor Fernández	2–3
(United Arab Emirates) RKC/ZRT	Audi RS 3 LMS TCR	Volkswagen 2.0 L I4	111	(United Kingdom) Ricky Coomber	1
(United Arab Emirates) RKC/ZRT	Audi RS 3 LMS TCR	Volkswagen 2.0 L I4	111	(Pakistan) Umair Khan	1
(United Arab Emirates) RKC/ZRT	Audi RS 3 LMS TCR	Volkswagen 2.0 L I4	111	(Republic of Ireland) Jonathan Mullan	1
(United Arab Emirates) RKC/ZRT	Audi RS 3 LMS TCR	Volkswagen 2.0 L I4	111	(United Kingdom) Jonathan Simmonds	1
(Lithuania) Juta Racing Junior	CUPRA León TCR	Volkswagen 2.0 L I4	121	(Lithuania) Nerijus Baliunas	2
(Lithuania) Juta Racing Junior	CUPRA León TCR	Volkswagen 2.0 L I4	121	(Lithuania) Algirdas Gelžinis	2
(Lithuania) Juta Racing Junior	CUPRA León TCR	Volkswagen 2.0 L I4	121	(Lithuania) Ignas Gelžinis	2
(Lithuania) Juta Racing Junior	CUPRA León TCR	Volkswagen 2.0 L I4	121	(Lithuania) Aurimas Jablonskis	2
(Lithuania) Juta Racing Junior	CUPRA León TCR	Volkswagen 2.0 L I4	121	(Lithuania) Audrius Navickas	2
(Spain) / Tictap Totcar Sport (Note: Car No. 123 entered as Tictap Totcar Sport for Round 3 and entered as Rail Equip by Totcar Sport for round 5.); (Spain) / Rail Equip by Totcar Sport	CUPRA León TCR	Volkswagen 2.0 L I4	123	(Spain) Jorge Belloc Diaz	3, 5
(Spain) / Tictap Totcar Sport; (Spain) / Rail Equip by Totcar Sport	CUPRA León TCR	Volkswagen 2.0 L I4	123	(Spain) Jorge Belloc Ruiz	3, 5
(Spain) / Tictap Totcar Sport; (Spain) / Rail Equip by Totcar Sport	CUPRA León TCR	Volkswagen 2.0 L I4	123	(Spain) Álvaro Rodríguez Sastre	3, 5
(Netherlands) / Bas Koeten Racing (Note: Car No. 125 entered as Bas Koeten Racing and car No. 175 entered as NKPP Racing by Bas Koeten Racing.); (Netherlands) / NKPP Racing by Bas Koeten Racing	CUPRA León TCR	Volkswagen 2.0 L I4	125	(Netherlands) Christiaan Frankenhout	5
(Netherlands) / Bas Koeten Racing; (Netherlands) / NKPP Racing by Bas Koeten Racing	CUPRA León TCR	Volkswagen 2.0 L I4	125	(Netherlands) Bert Mets	5
(Netherlands) / Bas Koeten Racing; (Netherlands) / NKPP Racing by Bas Koeten Racing	CUPRA León TCR	Volkswagen 2.0 L I4	125	(Netherlands) Bob Stevens	5
(Netherlands) / Bas Koeten Racing; (Netherlands) / NKPP Racing by Bas Koeten Racing	CUPRA León TCR	Volkswagen 2.0 L I4	125	(Netherlands) Jos Stevens	5
(Netherlands) / Bas Koeten Racing; (Netherlands) / NKPP Racing by Bas Koeten Racing	CUPRA León TCR	Volkswagen 2.0 L I4	125	(Netherlands) Martin van den Berge	5
(Netherlands) / Bas Koeten Racing; (Netherlands) / NKPP Racing by Bas Koeten Racing	CUPRA León TCR	Volkswagen 2.0 L I4	175	(Netherlands) Gijs Bessem	2
(Netherlands) / Bas Koeten Racing; (Netherlands) / NKPP Racing by Bas Koeten Racing	CUPRA León TCR	Volkswagen 2.0 L I4	175	(Netherlands) Harry Hilders	2
(Switzerland) TOPCAR sport	CUPRA León TCR	Volkswagen 2.0 L I4	131	(Switzerland) Fabian Danz	1, 4
(Switzerland) TOPCAR sport	CUPRA León TCR	Volkswagen 2.0 L I4	131	(Switzerland) Ronny Jost	1, 4
(Switzerland) TOPCAR sport	CUPRA León TCR	Volkswagen 2.0 L I4	131	(Germany) Benjamin Leuchter	1
(Switzerland) TOPCAR sport	CUPRA León TCR	Volkswagen 2.0 L I4	131	(Germany) Patrick Sing	1
(Switzerland) TOPCAR sport	CUPRA León TCR	Volkswagen 2.0 L I4	131	(Switzerland) Adrian Spescha	1
(Switzerland) TOPCAR sport	CUPRA León TCR	Volkswagen 2.0 L I4	131	(Switzerland) Ruedi Jost	4
(Hungary) Zengő Motorsport	CUPRA León TCR	Volkswagen 2.0 L I4	133	(Hungary) Tamás Horváth	1
(Hungary) Zengő Motorsport	CUPRA León TCR	Volkswagen 2.0 L I4	133	(Hungary) Gábor Kismarty-Lechner	1
(Hungary) Zengő Motorsport	CUPRA León TCR	Volkswagen 2.0 L I4	133	(Hungary) Ga'l Szabolcs	1
(Hungary) Zengő Motorsport	CUPRA León TCR	Volkswagen 2.0 L I4	133	(Hungary) Csaba Tóth	1
(Hungary) Zengő Motorsport	CUPRA León TCR	Volkswagen 2.0 L I4	133	(Hungary) Zoltán Zengő	1
(United Kingdom) Simpson Motorsport	Audi RS 3 LMS TCR	Volkswagen 2.0 L I4	138	(United States) Gunnar Jeannette	1
(United Kingdom) Simpson Motorsport	Audi RS 3 LMS TCR	Volkswagen 2.0 L I4	138	(United Kingdom) Sacha Kakad	1
(United Kingdom) Simpson Motorsport	Audi RS 3 LMS TCR	Volkswagen 2.0 L I4	138	(United States) Rodrigo Sales	1
(United Kingdom) Simpson Motorsport	Audi RS 3 LMS TCR	Volkswagen 2.0 L I4	138	(United Kingdom) Paul Smith	1
(United Kingdom) Simpson Motorsport	Audi RS 3 LMS TCR	Volkswagen 2.0 L I4	138	(Romania) Mahail Zamfir	1
(Italy) Élite Motorsport	Volkswagen Golf GTI TCR	Volkswagen 2.0 L I4	147	(Italy) Pierluigi Alessandri	2
(Italy) Élite Motorsport	Volkswagen Golf GTI TCR	Volkswagen 2.0 L I4	147	(Italy) Simone Patrinicola	2
(Italy) Élite Motorsport	Volkswagen Golf GTI TCR	Volkswagen 2.0 L I4	147	(Italy) Gianvito Rossi	2
(Spain) Baporo Motorsport	CUPRA León TCR	Volkswagen 2.0 L I4	151	(Spain) Lorenzo Fluxá	5
(Spain) Baporo Motorsport	CUPRA León TCR	Volkswagen 2.0 L I4	151	(Spain) Llorenç Fluxà Domene	5
(Spain) Baporo Motorsport	CUPRA León TCR	Volkswagen 2.0 L I4	151	(Spain) Manel Lao Cornago	5
(Spain) Baporo Motorsport	CUPRA León TCR	Volkswagen 2.0 L I4	151	(Spain) Manel Lao Gorina	5
(Belgium) QSR Racing	Audi RS 3 LMS TCR	Volkswagen 2.0 L I4	154	(Belgium) Jimmy de Breucker	1
(Belgium) QSR Racing	Audi RS 3 LMS TCR	Volkswagen 2.0 L I4	154	(Belgium) Kobe de Breucker	1
(Belgium) QSR Racing	Audi RS 3 LMS TCR	Volkswagen 2.0 L I4	154	(Belgium) David Drieghe	1
(Belgium) QSR Racing	Audi RS 3 LMS TCR	Volkswagen 2.0 L I4	154	(Germany) Yevgen Sokolovskiy	1
(Belgium) QSR Racing	Audi RS 3 LMS TCR	Volkswagen 2.0 L I4	154	(Netherlands) Martin Huisman	1
(Belgium) AC Motorsport	Audi RS 3 LMS TCR	Volkswagen 2.0 L I4	188	(Belgium) Mathieu Detry	All
(Belgium) AC Motorsport	Audi RS 3 LMS TCR	Volkswagen 2.0 L I4	188	(France) Stéphane Perrin	All
(Belgium) AC Motorsport	Audi RS 3 LMS TCR	Volkswagen 2.0 L I4	188	(France) Sebastien Morales	1
(Belgium) AC Motorsport	Audi RS 3 LMS TCR	Volkswagen 2.0 L I4	188	(France) Philippe Thirion	1
(Belgium) AC Motorsport	Audi RS 3 LMS TCR	Volkswagen 2.0 L I4	188	(Belgium) David Dermont	3
(Belgium) AC Motorsport	Audi RS 3 LMS TCR	Volkswagen 2.0 L I4	188	(Germany) Stefan Wieninger	4
(Belgium) AC Motorsport	Audi RS 3 LMS TCR	Volkswagen 2.0 L I4	188	(United Kingdom) James Kaye	5
(Belgium) AC Motorsport	Audi RS 3 LMS TCR	Volkswagen 2.0 L I4	188	(Belgium) Vincent Radermecker	5
(Belgium) AC Motorsport	Audi RS 3 LMS TCR	Volkswagen 2.0 L I4	188	(Netherlands) Rik Breukers	7
(Belgium) AC Motorsport	Audi RS 3 LMS TCR	Volkswagen 2.0 L I4	188	(Canada) Matthew Taskinen	7
(Belgium) AC Motorsport	Audi RS 3 LMS TCR	Volkswagen 2.0 L I4	199	(France) Thierry Chkondali	1
(Belgium) AC Motorsport	Audi RS 3 LMS TCR	Volkswagen 2.0 L I4	199	(United States) Maxwell Hanratty	1
(Belgium) AC Motorsport	Audi RS 3 LMS TCR	Volkswagen 2.0 L I4	199	(Germany) Thomas Kiefer	1
(Belgium) AC Motorsport	Audi RS 3 LMS TCR	Volkswagen 2.0 L I4	199	(France) Sebastien Lajoux	1
(Belgium) AC Motorsport	Audi RS 3 LMS TCR	Volkswagen 2.0 L I4	199	(Germany) Mark Wallenwein	1
TCX
(Netherlands) JR Motorsport	BMW M3 E46 GTR	BMW 4.0 L V8	202	(Netherlands) Bas Schouten	2
(Netherlands) JR Motorsport	BMW M3 E46 GTR	BMW 4.0 L V8	202	(Netherlands) Coos Schouten	2
(Netherlands) JR Motorsport	BMW M3 E46 GTR	BMW 4.0 L V8	202	(Netherlands) Dirk Schouten	2
(Netherlands) JR Motorsport	BMW M3 F80	BMW S55B30T0 3.0 L I6	203	(Belgium) Ward Sluys	2
(Netherlands) JR Motorsport	BMW M3 F80	BMW S55B30T0 3.0 L I6	203	(Netherlands) Sandra van der Sloot	2
(Netherlands) JR Motorsport	BMW M3 F80	BMW S55B30T0 3.0 L I6	203	(Netherlands) Ted van Vliet	2
(Italy) Lotus PB Racing	Lotus Elise Cup PB-R	Toyota 1.4 L I4	205	(Italy) Denis Bonvini	2
(Italy) Lotus PB Racing	Lotus Elise Cup PB-R	Toyota 1.4 L I4	205	(Switzerland) Luca Flaccadori	2
(Italy) Lotus PB Racing	Lotus Elise Cup PB-R	Toyota 1.4 L I4	205	(Switzerland) Maurizio Fortina	2
(Italy) Lotus PB Racing	Lotus Elise Cup PB-R	Toyota 1.4 L I4	205	(Italy) Alberto Grisi	2
(Italy) Lotus PB Racing	Lotus Elise Cup PB-R	Toyota 1.4 L I4	205	(Switzerland) Franco Nespoli	2
(Belgium) Speed Lover	Porsche 718 Cayman GT4 Clubsport	Porsche 3.8 L Flat-6	206	(Belgium) Kurt Hensen	2
(Belgium) Speed Lover	Porsche 718 Cayman GT4 Clubsport	Porsche 3.8 L Flat-6	206	(Belgium) Philippe Wils	2
(Belgium) PK Carsport	BMW M2 ClubSport Racing	BMW S55B30T0 3.0 L I6	208	(Belgium) Peter Guelinckx	1
(Belgium) PK Carsport	BMW M2 ClubSport Racing	BMW S55B30T0 3.0 L I6	208	(Belgium) Bert Longin	1
(Belgium) PK Carsport	BMW M2 ClubSport Racing	BMW S55B30T0 3.0 L I6	208	(Belgium) Stienes Longin	1
(Belgium) PK Carsport	BMW M2 ClubSport Racing	BMW S55B30T0 3.0 L I6	208	(Belgium) Stijn Lowette	1
(Netherlands) Munckhof Racing	BMW M4 GTR	BMW B58B30 3.0 L Twin-Turbo I6	210	(Netherlands) Marco Poland	4, 6
(Netherlands) Munckhof Racing	BMW M4 GTR	BMW B58B30 3.0 L Twin-Turbo I6	210	(Netherlands) Eric van den Munckhof	4, 6
(Switzerland) Autorama Motorsport	SEAT León Cup Racer	Volkswagen 2.0 L I4	211	(Switzerland) Armando Stanco	4
(Switzerland) Autorama Motorsport	SEAT León Cup Racer	Volkswagen 2.0 L I4	211	(Switzerland) Dario Stanco	4
(Switzerland) Autorama Motorsport	SEAT León Cup Racer	Volkswagen 2.0 L I4	211	(Switzerland) Luigi Stanco	4
(Denmark) Team Sally Racing	CUPRA León TCR	Volkswagen 2.0 L I4	218	(Denmark) Anders Lund	1
(Denmark) Team Sally Racing	CUPRA León TCR	Volkswagen 2.0 L I4	218	(Denmark) Niels Nyboe	1
(Denmark) Team Sally Racing	CUPRA León TCR	Volkswagen 2.0 L I4	218	(Denmark) Peter Obel	1
(Denmark) Team Sally Racing	CUPRA León TCR	Volkswagen 2.0 L I4	218	(Denmark) Henrik Thomsen	1
(United States) Team ACP - Tangerine Associates	BMW M2 ClubSport Racing	BMW S55B30T0 3.0 L I6	221	(United States) Catesby Jones	5
(United States) Team ACP - Tangerine Associates	BMW M2 ClubSport Racing	BMW S55B30T0 3.0 L I6	221	(United States) Jim Norman	5
(United States) Team ACP - Tangerine Associates	BMW M2 ClubSport Racing	BMW S55B30T0 3.0 L I6	221	(Belgium) Wim Spinoy	5
(France) Nordschleife Racing	Ligier JS2 R	Ford 3.7 L V6	226	(France) Guillaume Roman	3, 7
(France) Nordschleife Racing	Ligier JS2 R	Ford 3.7 L V6	226	(France) Thierry Chkondali	3
(France) Nordschleife Racing	Ligier JS2 R	Ford 3.7 L V6	226	(France) Daniel Waszczinski	3
(France) Nordschleife Racing	Ligier JS2 R	Ford 3.7 L V6	226	(France) Lucca Ayari	7
(France) Nordschleife Racing	Ligier JS2 R	Ford 3.7 L V6	226	(France) Cédric Houot	7
(France) Nordschleife Racing	Ligier JS2 R	Ford 3.7 L V6	226	(Canada) Michel Sallenbach	7
(United Kingdom) CWS Engineering	Ginetta G55 Supercup	Ford Cyclone 3.7 L V6	278	(United States) Jean-Francois Brunot	1–5, 7
(United Kingdom) CWS Engineering	Ginetta G55 Supercup	Ford Cyclone 3.7 L V6	278	(United Kingdom) Colin White	1–5, 7
(United Kingdom) CWS Engineering	Ginetta G55 Supercup	Ford Cyclone 3.7 L V6	278	(United Kingdom) Adam Hayes	1
(United Kingdom) CWS Engineering	Ginetta G55 Supercup	Ford Cyclone 3.7 L V6	278	(United Kingdom) Simon Orange	1
(United Kingdom) CWS Engineering	Ginetta G55 Supercup	Ford Cyclone 3.7 L V6	278	(Germany) Michael Tischner	1
(United Kingdom) CWS Engineering	Ginetta G55 Supercup	Ford Cyclone 3.7 L V6	278	(United Kingdom) James Kell	2
(United Kingdom) CWS Engineering	Ginetta G55 Supercup	Ford Cyclone 3.7 L V6	278	(United Kingdom) JM Littman	3
(United Kingdom) CWS Engineering	Ginetta G55 Supercup	Ford Cyclone 3.7 L V6	278	(United Kingdom) Angus Fender	5
(United Kingdom) CWS Engineering	Ginetta G55 Supercup	Ford Cyclone 3.7 L V6	278	(United Kingdom) Ian Stinton	5
(United Kingdom) CWS Engineering	Ginetta G55 Supercup	Ford Cyclone 3.7 L V6	278	(United States) Joe Burris	7
(United Kingdom) CWS Engineering	Ginetta G55 Supercup	Ford Cyclone 3.7 L V6	278	(United States) Warren Dexter	7
(United Kingdom) CWS Engineering	Ginetta G55 Supercup	Ford Cyclone 3.7 L V6	278	(United States) Matt Rivard	7
(United Kingdom) CWS Engineering	Ginetta G55 Supercup	Ford Cyclone 3.7 L V6	279	(South Africa) Paul Hill	1
(United Kingdom) CWS Engineering	Ginetta G55 Supercup	Ford Cyclone 3.7 L V6	279	(South Africa) Mikaeel Pitamber	1
(United Kingdom) CWS Engineering	Ginetta G55 Supercup	Ford Cyclone 3.7 L V6	279	(South Africa) Bradley Scorer	1
(United Kingdom) CWS Engineering	Ginetta G55 Supercup	Ford Cyclone 3.7 L V6	279	(South Africa) Michael Stephens	1
(United Kingdom) CWS Engineering	Ginetta G55 Supercup	Ford Cyclone 3.7 L V6	280	(South Africa) Paul Hill	1
(United Kingdom) CWS Engineering	Ginetta G55 Supercup	Ford Cyclone 3.7 L V6	280	(South Africa) Mikaeel Pitamber	1
(United Kingdom) CWS Engineering	Ginetta G55 Supercup	Ford Cyclone 3.7 L V6	280	(South Africa) Bradley Scorer	1
(United Kingdom) CWS Engineering	Ginetta G55 Supercup	Ford Cyclone 3.7 L V6	280	(South Africa) Michael Stephens	1
(Germany) fun-M Motorsport	BMW M240i Racing Cup	BMW N55B30T0 3.0 L I6	302	(Lithuania) Julius Adomavičius	1
(Germany) fun-M Motorsport	BMW M240i Racing Cup	BMW N55B30T0 3.0 L I6	302	(United Kingdom) John Corbett	1
(Germany) fun-M Motorsport	BMW M240i Racing Cup	BMW N55B30T0 3.0 L I6	302	(United Kingdom) George King	1
(Germany) fun-M Motorsport	BMW M240i Racing Cup	BMW N55B30T0 3.0 L I6	302	(Germany) Simon Klemund	1
(Germany) fun-M Motorsport	BMW M240i Racing Cup	BMW N55B30T0 3.0 L I6	302	(United Kingdom) James Winslow	1

== Race results ==
Bold indicates overall winner.

Event	Circuit	TCR Winners	TCX Winners	TC Winners	Report
1	(United Arab Emirates) Dubai Autodrome	**(Switzerland) No. 131 TOPCAR Sport**	(Belgium) No. 208 PK Carsport	(Germany) No. 302 fun-M Motorsport	Report
1	(United Arab Emirates) Dubai Autodrome	**(Switzerland) Fabian Danz** **(Switzerland) Ronny Jost** **(Germany) Benjamin Leuchter** **(Germany) Patrick Sing** **(Switzerland) Adrian Spescha**	(Belgium) Peter Guelinckx (Belgium) Bert Longin (Belgium) Stienes Longin (Belgium) Stijn Lowette	(Lithuania) Julius Adomavičius (United Kingdom) John Corbett (United Kingdom) George King (Germany) Simon Klemund (United Kingdom) James Winslow	Report
2	(Italy) Mugello	**(Netherlands) No. 101 Red Camel-Jordans.nl**	(Belgium) No. 206 Speed Lover	No entries	Report
2	(Italy) Mugello	**(Netherlands) Ivo Breukers** **(Netherlands) Rik Breukers**	(Belgium) Kurt Hensen (Belgium) Philippe Wils	No entries	Report
3	(France) Circuit Paul Ricard	(Switzerland) **No. 1 Autorama Motorsport by Wolf-Power Racing**	(France) No. 226 Nordschleife Racing	No entries	Report
3	(France) Circuit Paul Ricard	(Norway) **Emil Heyerdahl** (Austria) **Constantin Kletzer** (Switzerland) **Yannick Mettler** (Switzerland) **Jérôme Ogay**	(France) Thierry Chkondali (France) Guillaume Roman (France) Daniel Waszczinski	No entries	Report
4	(Germany) Hockenheimring	**(Switzerland) No. 1 Autorama Motorsport by Wolf-Power Racing**	(United Kingdom) No. 278 CWS Engineering	No entries	Report
4	(Germany) Hockenheimring	**(Norway) Emil Heyerdahl** **(Austria) Constantin Kletzer** **(Switzerland) Jasmin Preisig**	(United States) Jean-Francois Brunot (United Kingdom) Colin White	No entries	Report
5	(Spain) Barcelona	**(Switzerland) No. 112 Autorama Motorsport by Wolf-Power Racing**	(United Kingdom) No. 278 CWS Engineering	No entries	Report
5	(Spain) Barcelona	**(Lithuania) Sigitas Ambrazevicius** **(Lithuania) Arunas Geciauskas** **(Lithuania) Vytenis Gulbinas** **(Netherlands) Paul Sieljes**	(United States) Jean-Francois Brunot (United Kingdom) Angus Fender (United Kingdom) Ian Stinton (United Kingdom) Colin White	No entries	Report
6	(Hungary) Hungaroring	**(Switzerland) No. 112 Autorama Motorsport by Wolf-Power Racing**	(Netherlands) No. 210 Munckhof Racing	No entries	Report
6	(Hungary) Hungaroring	**(Norway) Emil Heyerdahl** **(Switzerland) Christoph Lenz** **(Serbia) Miloš Pavlović** **(Switzerland) Jasmin Preisig**	(Netherlands) Marco Poland (Netherlands) Eric van den Munckhof	No entries	Report
7	(United States) Sebring	**(Belgium) No. 188 AC Motorsport**	(France) No. 226 Nordschleife Racing	No entries	Report
7	(United States) Sebring	**(Netherlands) Rik Breukers** **(Belgium) Mathieu Detry** **(France) Stéphane Perrin** **(Canada) Matthew Taskinen**	(France) Lucca Ayarii (France) Cédric Houot (France) Guillaume Roman (Canada) Michel Sallenbach	No entries	Report

=== Championship standings ===
==== Drivers' Overall ====
Pos.	Drivers	Team	Class	(United Arab Emirates) DUB	(Italy) MUG	(France) LEC	(Germany) HOC	(Spain) BAR	(Hungary) HUN	(United States) SEB	Pts.
1	(Norway) Emil Heyerdahl (Austria) Constantin Kletzer	(Switzerland) No. 1 Autorama Motorsport by Wolf-Power Racing	TCR	22	22	9	13	14	9		112
2	(Belgium) Mathieu Detry (France) Stéphane Perrin	(Belgium) No. 188 AC Motorsport	TCR	23	17	12	14	23	8		104
3	(United States) Jean-Francois Brunot (United Kingdom) Colin White	(United Kingdom) No. 278 CWS Engineering	TCX	26	28	18	15	19			102
4	(Switzerland) Jasmin Preisig	(Switzerland) No. 112 Autorama Motorsport by Wolf-Power Racing	TCR	18					7		90
4	(Switzerland) Jasmin Preisig	(Switzerland) No. 1 Autorama Motorsport by Wolf-Power Racing	TCR				13	14			90
5	(Switzerland) Fabian Danz	(Switzerland) No. 131 TOPCAR Sport	TCR	17			Ret				58
5	(Switzerland) Fabian Danz	(Switzerland) No. 112 Autorama Motorsport by Wolf-Power Racing	TCR			10					58
5	(Switzerland) Fabian Danz	(Switzerland) No. 1 Autorama Motorsport by Wolf-Power Racing	TCR						9		58
6	(Switzerland) Jérôme Ogay	(Switzerland) No. 1 Autorama Motorsport by Wolf-Power Racing	TCR	22		9					45
7	(Germany) Marlon Menden	(Switzerland) No. 1 Autorama Motorsport by Wolf-Power Racing	TCR	22							43
7	(Germany) Marlon Menden	(Switzerland) No. 112 Autorama Motorsport by Wolf-Power Racing	TCR			10					43
8	(France) Thierry Chkondali	(Belgium) No. 199 AC Motorsport	TCR	24							40
8	(France) Thierry Chkondali	(France) No. 226 Nordschleife Racing	TCX			16					40
9	(Spain) Jorge Belloc Diaz (Spain) Jorge Belloc Ruiz (Spain) Álvaro Rodríguez Sastre	(Spain) No. 123 Tictap Totcar Sport (Spain) No. 123 Rail Equip by Totcar Sport	TCR			13		16			38
10	(Netherlands) Marco Poland (Netherlands) Eric van den Munckhof	(Netherlands) No. 210 Munckhof Racing	TCX				18		12		33
Pos.	Drivers	Team	Class	(United Arab Emirates) DUB	(Italy) MUG	(France) LEC	(Germany) HOC	(Spain) BAR	(Hungary) HUN	(United States) SEB	Pts.

Colour	Result
Gold	Winner
Silver	Second place
Bronze	Third place
Green	Points classification
Blue	Non-points classification
Blue	Non-classified finish (NC)
Purple	Retired, not classified (Ret)
Red	Did not qualify (DNQ)
Red	Did not pre-qualify (DNPQ)
Black	Disqualified (DSQ)
White	Did not start (DNS)
White	Withdrew (WD)
White	Race cancelled (C)
Blank	Did not practice (DNP)
Blank	Did not arrive (DNA)
Blank	Excluded (EX)

**Bold** – Pole
Italics – Fastest Lap

† – Drivers did not finish the race, but were classified as they completed over 60% of the class winner's race distance.

==== Teams' Overall ====
Pos.	Team	Class	(United Arab Emirates) DUB	(Italy) MUG	(France) LEC	(Germany) HOC	(Spain) BAR	(Hungary) HUN	(United States) SEB	Pts.
1	(Switzerland) No. 1 Autorama Motorsport by Wolf-Power Racing	TCR	22	22	9	13	14	9		112
2	(Belgium) No. 188 AC Motorsport	TCR	23	17	12	14	23	8		104
3	(United Kingdom) No. 278 CWS Engineering	TCX	26	28	18	15	19			102
4	(Switzerland) No. 112 Autorama Motorsport by Wolf-Power Racing	TCR	18	DNS	10	27	13	7		99
5	(Spain) No. 123 Tictap Totcar Sport (Spain) No. 123 Rail Equip by Totcar Sport	TCR			13		16			38
6	(Netherlands) No. 210 Munckhof Racing	TCX				18		12		33
7	(Netherlands) No. 101 Red Camel-Jordans.nl	TCR	37	15	Ret			Ret		33
8	(Switzerland) No. 131 TOPCAR Sport	TCR	17			Ret				30
9	(Belgium) No. 208 PK Carsport	TCX	25							29
10	(Germany) No. 302 fun-M Motorsport	TC	28							24
Pos.	Team	Class	(United Arab Emirates) DUB	(Italy) MUG	(France) LEC	(Germany) HOC	(Spain) BAR	(Hungary) HUN	(United States) SEB	Pts.

† – Drivers did not finish the race, but were classified as they completed over 60% of the class winner's race distance.

==== TCR Drivers' ====
Pos.	Drivers	Team	(United Arab Emirates) DUB	(Italy) MUG	(France) LEC	(Germany) HOC	(Spain) BAR	(Hungary) HUN	(United States) SEB	Pts.
1	(Norway) Emil Heyerdahl (Austria) Constantin Kletzer	(Switzerland) No. 1 Autorama Motorsport by Wolf-Power Racing	22	22	9	13	14	9		114
2	(Belgium) Mathieu Detry (France) Stéphane Perrin	(Belgium) No. 188 AC Motorsport	23	17	12	14	23	8		104
3	(Switzerland) Jasmin Preisig	(Switzerland) No. 112 Autorama Motorsport by Wolf-Power Racing	18							72
3	(Switzerland) Jasmin Preisig	(Switzerland) No. 1 Autorama Motorsport by Wolf-Power Racing				13	14	7		72
4	(Switzerland) Fabian Danz	(Switzerland) No. 131 TOPCAR Sport	17			Ret				58
4	(Switzerland) Fabian Danz	(Switzerland) No. 112 Autorama Motorsport by Wolf-Power Racing			10					58
4	(Switzerland) Fabian Danz	(Switzerland) No. 1 Autorama Motorsport by Wolf-Power Racing						9		58
5	(Switzerland) Jérôme Ogay	(Switzerland) No. 1 Autorama Motorsport by Wolf-Power Racing	22		9					45
6	(Germany) Marlon Menden	(Switzerland) No. 1 Autorama Motorsport by Wolf-Power Racing	22							43
6	(Germany) Marlon Menden	(Switzerland) No. 112 Autorama Motorsport by Wolf-Power Racing			10					43
7	(Spain) Jorge Belloc Diaz (Spain) Jorge Belloc Ruiz (Spain) Álvaro Rodríguez Sastre	(Spain) No. 123 Tictap Totcar Sport (Spain) No. 123 Rail Equip by Totcar Sport			13		16			38
8	(Netherlands) Ivo Breukers	(Netherlands) No. 101 Red Camel-Jordans.nl	37	15	Ret			Ret		33
9	(Switzerland) Ronny Jost	(Switzerland) No. 131 TOPCAR Sport	17			Ret				30
9	(Germany) Benjamin Leuchter (Switzerland) Adrian Spescha	(Switzerland) No. 131 TOPCAR Sport	17							30
10	(Lithuania) Sigitas Ambrazevicius (Lithuania) Arunas Geciauskas (Lithuania) Vytenis Gulbinas (Netherlands) Paul Sieljes	(Switzerland) No. 112 Autorama Motorsport by Wolf-Power Racing					13			29
Pos.	Drivers	Team	(United Arab Emirates) DUB	(Italy) MUG	(France) LEC	(Germany) HOC	(Spain) BAR	(Hungary) HUN	(United States) SEB	Pts.

† – Drivers did not finish the race, but were classified as they completed over 60% of the class winner's race distance.

==== TCR Teams' ====
Pos.	Team	(United Arab Emirates) DUB	(Italy) MUG	(France) LEC	(Germany) HOC	(Spain) BAR	(Hungary) HUN	(United States) SEB	Pts.
1	(Switzerland) No. 1 Autorama Motorsport by Wolf-Power Racing	22	22	9	13	14	9		112
2	(Belgium) No. 188 AC Motorsport	23	17	12	14	23	8		104
3	(Switzerland) No. 112 Autorama Motorsport by Wolf-Power Racing	18	DNS	10	27	13	7		99
4	(Spain) No. 123 Tictap Totcar Sport (Spain) No. 123 Rail Equip by Totcar Sport			13		16			38
5	(Netherlands) No. 101 Red Camel-Jordans.nl	37	15	Ret			Ret		33
6	(Switzerland) No. 131 TOPCAR Sport	17			Ret				30
7	(Belgium) No. 199 AC Motorsport	24							22
8	(Spain) No. 151 Baporo Motorsport					18			21
9	(Thailand) No. 107 BBR - Billionaire Boys Racing	27†							20
10	(Hungary) No. 133 Zengő Motorsport	29							18
Pos.	Team	(United Arab Emirates) DUB	(Italy) MUG	(France) LEC	(Germany) HOC	(Spain) BAR	(Hungary) HUN	(United States) SEB	Pts.

† – Drivers did not finish the race, but were classified as they completed over 60% of the class winner's race distance.

==== TCX Drivers' ====
Pos.	Drivers	Team	(United Arab Emirates) DUB	(Italy) MUG	(France) LEC	(Germany) HOC	(Spain) BAR	(Hungary) HUN	(United States) SEB	Pts.
1	(United States) Jean-Francois Brunot (United Kingdom) Colin White	(United Kingdom) No. 278 CWS Engineering	26	28	18	15	19			101
2	(Netherlands) Marco Poland (Netherlands) Eric van den Munckhof	(Netherlands) No. 210 Munckhof Racing				18		12		33
3	(Belgium) Peter Guelinckx (Belgium) Bert Longin (Belgium) Stienes Longin (Belgium) Stijn Lowette	(Belgium) No. 208 PK Carsport	25							29
4	(United Kingdom) Angus Fender (United Kingdom) Ian Stinton	(United Kingdom) No. 278 CWS Engineering					19			28
5	(United Kingdom) Adam Hayes (United Kingdom) Simon Orange (Germany) Michael Tischner	(United Kingdom) No. 278 CWS Engineering	26							26
6	(Belgium) Kurt Hensen (Belgium) Philippe Wils	(Belgium) No. 206 Speed Lover		24						18
6	(France) Thierry Chkondali (France) Guillaume Roman (France) Daniel Waszczinski	(France) No. 226 Nordschleife Racing			16					18
7	(Denmark) Anders Lund (Denmark) Niels Nyboe (Denmark) Peter Obel (Denmark) Henrik Thomsen	(Denmark) No. 218 Team Sally Racing	34							18
8	(United Kingdom) JM Littman	(United Kingdom) No. 278 CWS Engineering			18					15
8	(United Kingdom) James Kell	(United Kingdom) No. 278 CWS Engineering		28						15
9	(Netherlands) Bas Schouten (Netherlands) Coos Schouten (Netherlands) Dirk Schouten	(Netherlands) No. 202 JR Motorsport		31						11
9	(Switzerland) Armando Stanco (Switzerland) Dario Stanco (Switzerland) Luigi Stanco	(Switzerland) No. 211 Autorama Motorsport				20				11
10	(Switzerland) Luca Flaccador (Switzerland) Maurizio Fortina (Italy) Alberto Grisi (Switzerland) Franco Nespoli	(Italy) No. 205 Lotus PB Racing		35						7
11	(Netherlands) Sandra van der Sloot (Netherlands) Ted van Vliet	(Netherlands) No. 203 JR Motorsport		36†						3
	(United States) Catesby Jones (United States) Jim Norman (Belgium) Wim Spinoy	(United States) No. 221 Team ACP - Tangerine Associates					Ret			0
	(South Africa) Paul Hill (South Africa) Mikaeel Pitamber (South Africa) Bradley Scorer (South Africa) Michael Stephens	(United Kingdom) No. 279 CWS Engineering	DNS							0
Drivers ineligible to score points
	(South Africa) Paul Hill (South Africa) Mikaeel Pitamber (South Africa) Bradley Scorer (South Africa) Michael Stephens	(United Kingdom) No. 280 CWS Engineering	30							0
	(Italy) Denis Bonvini	(Italy) No. 205 Lotus PB Racing		35						0
	(Belgium) Ward Sluys	(Netherlands) No. 203 JR Motorsport		36†						0
Pos.	Drivers	Team	(United Arab Emirates) DUB	(Italy) MUG	(France) LEC	(Germany) HOC	(Spain) BAR	(Hungary) HUN	(United States) SEB	Pts.

† – Drivers did not finish the race, but were classified as they completed over 60% of the class winner's race distance.

==== TCX Teams' ====
Pos.	Team	(United Arab Emirates) DUB	(Italy) MUG	(France) LEC	(Germany) HOC	(Spain) BAR	(Hungary) HUN	(United States) SEB	Pts.
1	(United Kingdom) No. 278 CWS Engineering	26	28	18	15	19			101
2	(Netherlands) No. 210 Munckhof Racing				18		12		33
3	(Belgium) No. 208 PK Carsport	25							29
4	(United Kingdom) No. 280 CWS Engineering	30							21
5	(Belgium) No. 206 Speed Lover		24						18
5	(France) No. 226 Nordschleife Racing			16					18
6	(Denmark) No. 218 Team Sally Racing	34							18
7	(Netherlands) No. 202 JR Motorsport		31						11
7	(Switzerland) No. 211 Autorama Motorsport				20				11
8	(Italy) No. 205 Lotus PB Racing		35						7
9	(Netherlands) No. 203 JR Motorsport		36†						3
	(United States) No. 221 Team ACP - Tangerine Associates					Ret			0
	(United Kingdom) No. 279 CWS Engineering	DNS							0
Pos.	Team	(United Arab Emirates) DUB	(Italy) MUG	(France) LEC	(Germany) HOC	(Spain) BAR	(Hungary) HUN	(United States) SEB	Pts.

† – Drivers did not finish the race, but were classified as they completed over 60% of the class winner's race distance.

==== TC Drivers' ====
Pos.	Drivers	Team	(United Arab Emirates) DUB	(Italy) MUG	(France) LEC	(Germany) HOC	(Spain) BAR	(Hungary) HUN	(United States) SEB	Pts.
1	(Lithuania) Julius Adomavičius (United Kingdom) John Corbett (United Kingdom) George King (Germany) Simon Klemund (United Kingdom) James Winslow	(Germany) No. 302 fun-M Motorsport	28							24
Pos.	Drivers	Team	(United Arab Emirates) DUB	(Italy) MUG	(France) LEC	(Germany) HOC	(Spain) BAR	(Hungary) HUN	(United States) SEB	Pts.

† – Drivers did not finish the race, but were classified as they completed over 60% of the class winner's race distance.

==== TC Teams' ====
Pos.	Team	(United Arab Emirates) DUB	(Italy) MUG	(France) LEC	(Germany) HOC	(Spain) BAR	(Hungary) HUN	(United States) SEB	Pts.
1	(Germany) No. 302 fun-M Motorsport	28							24
Pos.	Team	(United Arab Emirates) DUB	(Italy) MUG	(France) LEC	(Germany) HOC	(Spain) BAR	(Hungary) HUN	(United States) SEB	Pts.

† – Drivers did not finish the race, but were classified as they completed over 60% of the class winner's race distance.

== See also ==
- 24H Series
