= 2021 12 Hours of Hungary =

Endurance Sportscar Race

Layout of the Hungaroring

The 2021 Hankook 12 Hours of Hungary was an endurance sports car race which took place on 2 and 3 October 2021. This was the 7th edition of the 12 Hours of Hungary. It was the sixth round of the 2021 24H GT and TCE Series. The event replaced the 2021 edition of the Coppa Florio on the 24H Series calendar.

== Schedule ==
Date	Time (local: CEST)	Event	Distance
Saturday, 2 October	13:25 - 14:25	Practice (Both classes)	60 mins
Saturday, 2 October	14:45 - 15:15	Qualifying - GT and TCE	30 Mins
Saturday, 2 October	16:30 - 18:30	Race	2 Hours
Sunday, 3 October	08:30 - 18:30	Race	10 Hours

== Entry list ==
16 cars were entered into the event; 11 GT cars and 5 TCEs.

Team	Car	Engine	No.	Drivers
GT3 (6 entries)
(Netherlands) JR Motorsport	BMW M6 GT3	BMW 4.4 L Turbo V8	2	(Netherlands) Ruud Olij (Netherlands) Bas Schouten (Netherlands) Ted van Vliet
(Germany) Rutronik Racing by TECE	Audi R8 LMS Evo	Audi 5.2 L V10	18	(Austria) Michael Doppelmayr (Germany) Swen Herberger (Germany) Pierre Kaffer
(Italy) MP Racing	Mercedes-AMG GT3 Evo	Mercedes-AMG M159 6.2 L V8	58	(Italy) Corinna Gostner (Italy) Manuela Gostner (Italy) Thomas Gostner
(United States) CP Racing	Mercedes-AMG GT3 Evo	Mercedes-AMG M159 6.2 L V8	85	(United States) Charles Espenlaub (United States) Joe Foster (United States) Shane Lewis (United States) Charles Putman
(Germany) Herberth Motorsport	Porsche 911 GT3 R (2019)	Porsche 4.0 L Flat-6	91	(Switzerland) Daniel Allemann (Germany) Ralf Bohn (Germany) Alfred Renauer
(Germany) Herberth Motorsport	Porsche 911 GT3 R (2019)	Porsche 4.0 L Flat-6	92	(Germany) "Bobby Gonzales" (Germany) Jürgen Häring (Germany) Tim Müller (Germany) Marco Seefried
GTX (2 entries)
(France) Vortex V8	Vortex 1.0 GTX	Chevrolet 6.2 L V8	701	(France) Philippe Bonnel (France) Gilles Courtois (Switzerland) Nicholas Nobs
(Lithuania) Siauliai - RD Signs racing team	Lamborghini Huracán Super Trofeo Evo	Lamborghini 5.2 L V10	720	(Lithuania) Audrius Butkevicius (Italy) Nicola Michelon (Lithuania) Paulius Paskevicius
991 (1 entry)
(Italy) Willi Motorsport by Ebimotors	Porsche 991 GT3 Cup II	Porsche 4.0 L Flat-6	955	(Italy) Fabrizio Broggi (Italy) Sabino de Castro (Romania) Sergiu Nicolae
GT4 (1 entry)
(Canada) ST Racing	BMW M4 GT4	BMW N55 3.0 L Twin-Turbo I6	438	(United States) Chandler Hull (United States) Jon Miller (Canada) Samantha Tan
P4 (1 entry)
(Germany) Car Collection Motorsport	Audi R8 LMS Evo II	Audi 5.2 L V10	500	(France) Nathanaël Berthon (Germany) Martin Lechmann (Estonia) Martin Rump
TCR (4 entries)
(Switzerland) Autorama Motorsport by Wolf-Power Racing	Volkswagen Golf GTI TCR	Volkswagen 2.0 L I4	1	(Switzerland) Fabian Danz (Norway) Emil Heyerdahl (Austria) Constantin Kletzer (Poland) Lukasz Stolarcyk
(Switzerland) Autorama Motorsport by Wolf-Power Racing	Volkswagen Golf GTI TCR	Volkswagen 2.0 L I4	112	(Norway) Emil Heyerdahl (Switzerland) Christoph Lenz (Serbia) Miloš Pavlović (Switzerland) Jasmin Preisig
(Netherlands) Red Camel-Jordans.nl	Audi RS 3 LMS TCR	Volkswagen 2.0 L I4	101	(Netherlands) Ivo Breukers (Netherlands) Luc Breukers (Netherlands) Rik Breukers
(Belgium) AC Motorsport	Audi RS 3 LMS TCR	Volkswagen 2.0 L I4	188	(Belgium) Mathieu Detry (France) Stéphane Perrin
TCX (1 entry)
(Netherlands) Munckhof Racing	BMW M4 GTR	BMW B58B30 3.0 L Twin-Turbo I6	210	(Netherlands) Marco Poland (Netherlands) Eric van den Munckhof

== Results ==
=== Qualifying ===
Fastest in class in bold.

Pos.	Class	No.	Team	Time
1	**GT3**	**92**	**(Germany) Herberth Motorsport**	**1:44.217**
2	GT3	91	(Germany) Herberth Motorsport	1:45.003
3	GT3	58	(Italy) MP Racing	1:45.117
4	GT3	85	(United States) CP Racing	1:45.915
5	**P4**	**500**	**(Germany) Car Collection Motorsport**	**1:46.022**
6	GT3	2	(Netherlands) JR Motorsport	1:46.077
7	**GTX**	**720**	**(Lithuania) Siauliai - RD Signs racing team**	**1:47.982**
8	**991**	**955**	**(Romania) Willi Motorsport by Ebimotors**	**1:51.457**
9	GT3	18	(Germany) Rutronik Racing by TECE	1:52.868
10	GTX	701	(France) Vortex V8	1:54.627
11	**TCR**	**1**	**(Switzerland) Autorama Motorsport by Wolf-Power Racing**	**1:54.995**
12	TCR	101	(Netherlands) Red Camel-Jordans.nl	1:55.347
13	TCR	188	(Belgium) AC Motorsport	1:55.828
14	TCR	112	(Switzerland) Autorama Motorsport by Wolf-Power Racing	1:56.227
15	**TCX**	**210**	**(Netherlands) Munckhof Racing**	**1:56.367**
16	**GT4**	**438**	**(Canada) ST Racing**	**1:56.392**

=== Race ===
==== Part 1 ====
Class winner in bold.

Pos	Class	No.	Team	Drivers	Chassis	Time/Reason	Laps
Pos	Class	No.	Team	Drivers	Engine	Time/Reason	Laps
1	**GT3**	**91**	**(Germany) Herberth Motorsport**	**(Switzerland) Daniel Allemann (Germany) Ralf Bohn (Germany) Alfred Renauer**	**Porsche 911 GT3 R (2019)**	**2:01:14.353**	**63**
1	**GT3**	**91**	**(Germany) Herberth Motorsport**	**(Switzerland) Daniel Allemann (Germany) Ralf Bohn (Germany) Alfred Renauer**	**Porsche 4.0 L Flat-6**	**2:01:14.353**	**63**
2	**P4**	**500**	**(Germany) Car Collection Motorsport**	**(France) Nathanaël Berthon (Germany) Martin Lechmann (Estonia) Martin Rump**	**Audi R8 LMS Evo II**	**+4.879**	**63**
2	**P4**	**500**	**(Germany) Car Collection Motorsport**	**(France) Nathanaël Berthon (Germany) Martin Lechmann (Estonia) Martin Rump**	**Audi 5.2 L V10**	**+4.879**	**63**
3	GT3	85	(United States) CP Racing	(United States) Charles Espenlaub (United States) Joe Foster (United States) Shane Lewis (United States) Charles Putman	Mercedes-AMG GT3 Evo	+1:45.695	63
3	GT3	85	(United States) CP Racing	(United States) Charles Espenlaub (United States) Joe Foster (United States) Shane Lewis (United States) Charles Putman	Mercedes-AMG M159 6.2 L V8	+1:45.695	63
4	GT3	92	(Germany) Herberth Motorsport	(Germany) "Bobby Gonzales" (Germany) Jürgen Häring (Germany) Tim Müller (Germany) Marco Seefried	Porsche 911 GT3 R (2019)	+1:51.121	63
4	GT3	92	(Germany) Herberth Motorsport	(Germany) "Bobby Gonzales" (Germany) Jürgen Häring (Germany) Tim Müller (Germany) Marco Seefried	Porsche 4.0 L Flat-6	+1:51.121	63
5	GT3	18	(Germany) Rutronik Racing by TECE	(Austria) Michael Doppelmayr (Germany) Swen Herberger (Germany) Pierre Kaffer	Audi R8 LMS Evo	+1 Lap	62
5	GT3	18	(Germany) Rutronik Racing by TECE	(Austria) Michael Doppelmayr (Germany) Swen Herberger (Germany) Pierre Kaffer	Audi 5.2 L V10	+1 Lap	62
6	GT3	2	(Netherlands) JR Motorsport	(Netherlands) Ruud Olij (Netherlands) Bas Schouten (Netherlands) Ted van Vliet	BMW M6 GT3	+2 Laps	61
6	GT3	2	(Netherlands) JR Motorsport	(Netherlands) Ruud Olij (Netherlands) Bas Schouten (Netherlands) Ted van Vliet	BMW 4.4 L Turbo V8	+2 Laps	61
7	GT3	58	(Italy) MP Racing	(Italy) Corinna Gostner (Italy) Manuela Gostner (Italy) Thomas Gostner	Mercedes-AMG GT3 Evo	+3 Laps	60
7	GT3	58	(Italy) MP Racing	(Italy) Corinna Gostner (Italy) Manuela Gostner (Italy) Thomas Gostner	Mercedes-AMG M159 6.2 L V8	+3 Laps	60
8	**991**	**955**	**(Romania) Willi Motorsport by Ebimotors**	**(Italy) Fabrizio Broggi (Italy) Sabino de Castro (Romania) Sergiu Nicolae**	**Porsche 991 GT3 II Cup**	**+3 Laps**	**60**
8	**991**	**955**	**(Romania) Willi Motorsport by Ebimotors**	**(Italy) Fabrizio Broggi (Italy) Sabino de Castro (Romania) Sergiu Nicolae**	**Porsche 4.0 L Flat-6**	**+3 Laps**	**60**
9	**GTX**	**720**	**(Lithuania) Siauliai - RD Signs racing team**	**(Lithuania) Audrius Butkevicius (Italy) Nicola Michelon (Lithuania) Paulius Paskevicius**	**Lamborghini Huracán Super Trofeo Evo**	**+4 Laps**	**59**
9	**GTX**	**720**	**(Lithuania) Siauliai - RD Signs racing team**	**(Lithuania) Audrius Butkevicius (Italy) Nicola Michelon (Lithuania) Paulius Paskevicius**	**Lamborghini 5.2 L V10**	**+4 Laps**	**59**
10	**GT4**	**438**	**(Canada) ST Racing**	**(United States) Chandler Hull (United States) Jon Miller (Canada) Samantha Tan**	**BMW M4 GT4**	**+5 Laps**	**58**
10	**GT4**	**438**	**(Canada) ST Racing**	**(United States) Chandler Hull (United States) Jon Miller (Canada) Samantha Tan**	**BMW N55 3.0 L Twin-Turbo I6**	**+5 Laps**	**58**
11	**TCR**	**1**	**(Switzerland) Autorama Motorsport by Wolf-Power Racing**	**(Switzerland) Fabian Danz (Norway) Emil Heyerdahl (Austria) Constantin Kletzer (Poland) Lukasz Stolarcyk**	**Volkswagen Golf GTI TCR**	**+6 Laps**	**57**
11	**TCR**	**1**	**(Switzerland) Autorama Motorsport by Wolf-Power Racing**	**(Switzerland) Fabian Danz (Norway) Emil Heyerdahl (Austria) Constantin Kletzer (Poland) Lukasz Stolarcyk**	**Volkswagen 2.0 L I4**	**+6 Laps**	**57**
12	TCR	112	(Switzerland) Autorama Motorsport by Wolf-Power Racing	(Norway) Emil Heyerdahl (Switzerland) Christoph Lenz (Serbia) Miloš Pavlović (Switzerland) Jasmin Preisig	Volkswagen Golf GTI TCR	+6 Laps	57
12	TCR	112	(Switzerland) Autorama Motorsport by Wolf-Power Racing	(Norway) Emil Heyerdahl (Switzerland) Christoph Lenz (Serbia) Miloš Pavlović (Switzerland) Jasmin Preisig	Volkswagen 2.0 L I4	+6 Laps	57
13	TCR	188	(Belgium) AC Motorsport	(Belgium) Mathieu Detry (France) Stéphane Perrin	Audi RS 3 LMS TCR	+6 Laps	57
13	TCR	188	(Belgium) AC Motorsport	(Belgium) Mathieu Detry (France) Stéphane Perrin	Volkswagen 2.0 L I4	+6 Laps	57
14	TCR	101	(Netherlands) Red Camel-Jordans.nl	(Netherlands) Ivo Breukers (Netherlands) Luc Breukers (Netherlands) Rik Breukers	Audi RS 3 LMS TCR	+6 Laps	57
14	TCR	101	(Netherlands) Red Camel-Jordans.nl	(Netherlands) Ivo Breukers (Netherlands) Luc Breukers (Netherlands) Rik Breukers	Volkswagen 2.0 L I4	+6 Laps	57
15	**TCX**	**210**	**(Netherlands) Munckhof Racing**	**(Netherlands) Marco Poland (Netherlands) Eric van den Munckhof**	**BMW M4 GTR**	**+7 Laps**	**56**
15	**TCX**	**210**	**(Netherlands) Munckhof Racing**	**(Netherlands) Marco Poland (Netherlands) Eric van den Munckhof**	**BMW B58B30 3.0 L Twin-Turbo I6**	**+7 Laps**	**56**
16	GTX	701	(France) Vortex V8	(France) Philippe Bonnel (France) Gilles Courtois (Switzerland) Nicholas Nobs	Vortex 1.0 GTX	+41 Laps	22
16	GTX	701	(France) Vortex V8	(France) Philippe Bonnel (France) Gilles Courtois (Switzerland) Nicholas Nobs	Chevrolet 6.2 L V8	+41 Laps	22

==== Part 2 ====
Class winner in bold.

Pos	Class	No.	Team	Drivers	Chassis	Time/Reason	Laps
Pos	Class	No.	Team	Drivers	Engine	Time/Reason	Laps
1	**GT3**	**91**	**(Germany) Herberth Motorsport**	**(Switzerland) Daniel Allemann (Germany) Ralf Bohn (Germany) Alfred Renauer**	**Porsche 911 GT3 R (2019)**	**10:00:04.321**	**367**
1	**GT3**	**91**	**(Germany) Herberth Motorsport**	**(Switzerland) Daniel Allemann (Germany) Ralf Bohn (Germany) Alfred Renauer**	**Porsche 4.0 L Flat-6**	**10:00:04.321**	**367**
2	GT3	85	(United States) CP Racing	(United States) Charles Espenlaub (United States) Joe Foster (United States) Shane Lewis (United States) Charles Putman	Mercedes-AMG GT3 Evo	+3 Laps	364
2	GT3	85	(United States) CP Racing	(United States) Charles Espenlaub (United States) Joe Foster (United States) Shane Lewis (United States) Charles Putman	Mercedes-AMG M159 6.2 L V8	+3 Laps	364
3	GT3	18	(Germany) Rutronik Racing by TECE	(Austria) Michael Doppelmayr (Germany) Swen Herberger (Germany) Pierre Kaffer	Audi R8 LMS Evo	+12 Laps	355
3	GT3	18	(Germany) Rutronik Racing by TECE	(Austria) Michael Doppelmayr (Germany) Swen Herberger (Germany) Pierre Kaffer	Audi 5.2 L V10	+12 Laps	355
4	**P4**	**500**	**(Germany) Car Collection Motorsport**	**(France) Nathanaël Berthon (Germany) Martin Lechmann (Estonia) Martin Rump**	**Audi R8 LMS Evo II**	**+12 Laps**	**355**
4	**P4**	**500**	**(Germany) Car Collection Motorsport**	**(France) Nathanaël Berthon (Germany) Martin Lechmann (Estonia) Martin Rump**	**Audi 5.2 L V10**	**+12 Laps**	**355**
5	**991**	**955**	**(Romania) Willi Motorsport by Ebimotors**	**(Italy) Fabrizio Broggi (Italy) Sabino de Castro (Romania) Sergiu Nicolae**	**Porsche 991 GT3 II Cup**	**+17 Laps**	**350**
5	**991**	**955**	**(Romania) Willi Motorsport by Ebimotors**	**(Italy) Fabrizio Broggi (Italy) Sabino de Castro (Romania) Sergiu Nicolae**	**Porsche 4.0 L Flat-6**	**+17 Laps**	**350**
6	GT3	2	(Netherlands) JR Motorsport	(Netherlands) Ruud Olij (Netherlands) Bas Schouten (Netherlands) Ted van Vliet	BMW M6 GT3	+18 Laps	349
6	GT3	2	(Netherlands) JR Motorsport	(Netherlands) Ruud Olij (Netherlands) Bas Schouten (Netherlands) Ted van Vliet	BMW 4.4 L Turbo V8	+18 Laps	349
7	**TCR**	**112**	**(Switzerland) Autorama Motorsport by Wolf-Power Racing**	**(Norway) Emil Heyerdahl (Switzerland) Christoph Lenz (Serbia) Miloš Pavlović (Switzerland) Jasmin Preisig**	**Volkswagen Golf GTI TCR**	**+32 Laps**	**335**
7	**TCR**	**112**	**(Switzerland) Autorama Motorsport by Wolf-Power Racing**	**(Norway) Emil Heyerdahl (Switzerland) Christoph Lenz (Serbia) Miloš Pavlović (Switzerland) Jasmin Preisig**	**Volkswagen 2.0 L I4**	**+32 Laps**	**335**
8	TCR	188	(Belgium) AC Motorsport	(Belgium) Mathieu Detry (France) Stéphane Perrin	Audi RS 3 LMS TCR	+33 Laps	334
8	TCR	188	(Belgium) AC Motorsport	(Belgium) Mathieu Detry (France) Stéphane Perrin	Volkswagen 2.0 L I4	+33 Laps	334
9	TCR	1	(Switzerland) Autorama Motorsport by Wolf-Power Racing	(Switzerland) Fabian Danz (Norway) Emil Heyerdahl (Austria) Constantin Kletzer (Poland) Lukasz Stolarcyk	Volkswagen Golf GTI TCR	+34 Laps	333
9	TCR	1	(Switzerland) Autorama Motorsport by Wolf-Power Racing	(Switzerland) Fabian Danz (Norway) Emil Heyerdahl (Austria) Constantin Kletzer (Poland) Lukasz Stolarcyk	Volkswagen 2.0 L I4	+34 Laps	333
10	**GTX**	**720**	**(Lithuania) Siauliai - RD Signs racing team**	**(Lithuania) Audrius Butkevicius (Italy) Nicola Michelon (Lithuania) Paulius Paskevicius**	**Lamborghini Huracán Super Trofeo Evo**	**+38 Laps**	**329**
10	**GTX**	**720**	**(Lithuania) Siauliai - RD Signs racing team**	**(Lithuania) Audrius Butkevicius (Italy) Nicola Michelon (Lithuania) Paulius Paskevicius**	**Lamborghini 5.2 L V10**	**+38 Laps**	**329**
11	**GT4**	**438**	**(Canada) ST Racing**	**(United States) Chandler Hull (United States) Jon Miller (Canada) Samantha Tan**	**BMW M4 GT4**	**+66 Laps**	**301**
11	**GT4**	**438**	**(Canada) ST Racing**	**(United States) Chandler Hull (United States) Jon Miller (Canada) Samantha Tan**	**BMW N55 3.0 L Twin-Turbo I6**	**+66 Laps**	**301**
12	**TCX**	**210**	**(Netherlands) Munckhof Racing**	**(Netherlands) Marco Poland (Netherlands) Eric van den Munckhof**	**BMW M4 GTR**	**+74 Laps**	**283**
12	**TCX**	**210**	**(Netherlands) Munckhof Racing**	**(Netherlands) Marco Poland (Netherlands) Eric van den Munckhof**	**BMW B58B30 3.0 L Twin-Turbo I6**	**+74 Laps**	**283**
13	GTX	701	(France) Vortex V8	(France) Philippe Bonnel (France) Gilles Courtois (Switzerland) Nicholas Nobs	Vortex 1.0 GTX	+74 Laps	283
13	GTX	701	(France) Vortex V8	(France) Philippe Bonnel (France) Gilles Courtois (Switzerland) Nicholas Nobs	Chevrolet 6.2 L V8	+74 Laps	283
14	GT3	58	(Italy) MP Racing	(Italy) Corinna Gostner (Italy) Manuela Gostner (Italy) Thomas Gostner	Mercedes-AMG GT3 Evo	+104 Laps	263
14	GT3	58	(Italy) MP Racing	(Italy) Corinna Gostner (Italy) Manuela Gostner (Italy) Thomas Gostner	Mercedes-AMG M159 6.2 L V8	+104 Laps	263
DNF	TCR	101	(Netherlands) Red Camel-Jordans.nl	(Netherlands) Ivo Breukers (Netherlands) Luc Breukers (Netherlands) Rik Breukers	Audi RS 3 LMS TCR	Mechanical	184
DNF	TCR	101	(Netherlands) Red Camel-Jordans.nl	(Netherlands) Ivo Breukers (Netherlands) Luc Breukers (Netherlands) Rik Breukers	Volkswagen 2.0 L I4	Mechanical	184
DNF	GT3	92	(Germany) Herberth Motorsport	(Germany) "Bobby Gonzales" (Germany) Jürgen Häring (Germany) Tim Müller (Germany) Marco Seefried	Porsche 911 GT3 R (2019)	Gearbox	159
DNF	GT3	92	(Germany) Herberth Motorsport	(Germany) "Bobby Gonzales" (Germany) Jürgen Häring (Germany) Tim Müller (Germany) Marco Seefried	Porsche 4.0 L Flat-6	Gearbox	159

24H GT Series
Previous race: 24 Hours of Barcelona	2021 season	Next race: 24 Hours of Sebring

24H TCE Series
Previous race: 24 Hours of Barcelona	2021 season	Next race: 24 Hours of Sebring
