= Nicolai Elghanayan =

American sports car driver

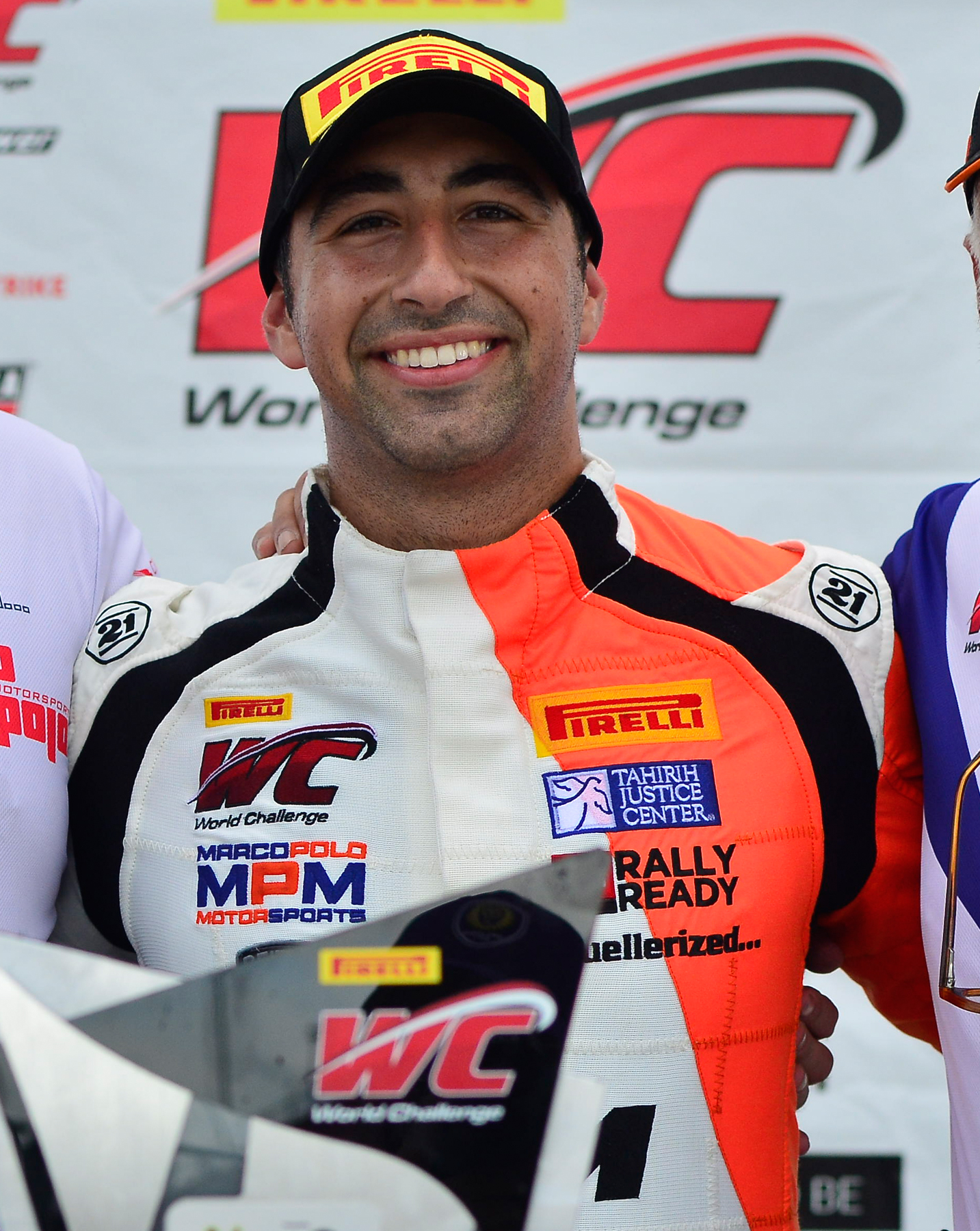
- Elghanayan in September 2018
- Nationality: (United States) American
- Born: Nicolai Nourollah Elghanayan; February 27, 1994 (age 32) Laguna Beach, California, U.S.

Blancpain GT World Challenge America career
- Current team: MarcoPolo Motorsports
- Car number: 71
- Starts: 15
- Wins: 1

Previous series
- 2016: Lotus Cup USA

Championship titles
- 2016 2017: Lotus Cup USA; Lotus Cup USA

Nicolai Nourollah Elghanayan (born February 27, 1994) is an American sports car driver and graduate of USC School of Architecture. Elghanayan currently races a KTM X-BOW in the Blancpain GT World Challenge America GT4 America class with MarcoPolo Motorsports.

== Early career ==
Elghanayan was born in Laguna Beach, California, and began racing with his father, Jeff, who previously raced in IMSA. The two started competing together in the Lotus Cup USA, where Nicolai earned the “Most Improved Driver” award in 2015, then his class championships in 2016 and 2017.

== Blancpain GT World Challenge America ==
After three years of competition in Lotus Cup USA, Elghanayan advanced to the Pirelli World Challenge, now the Blancpain GT World Challenge America, at the end of the 2017 season, competing in the TC class. He returned for a partial season in the GTS class, earning one win, three additional podium finishes, and two pole positions. His strongest result weekend of note was the Lime Rock Park double header, where he earned both pole positions, his first win, and an additional podium. It was announced in January 2019 that Elghanayan would run his first full Blancpain GT World Challenge America, running a KTM X-BOW in the GT4 America class with MarcoPolo Motorsports.

== Charity work ==
In 2018, Elghanayan and his father Jeff raised $39,000 for the Tahirih Justice Center, a non-profit national organization that provide legal services, policy advocacy, and training and education to protect immigrant women and girls fleeing gender-based violence. The father and son pair auctioned off VIP experiences at race events, raising enough funds to protect seven women from abuse. In January 2019, Elghanayan again auctioned off a VIP race weekend experience raising $21,000 for the Children's Hospital of Orange County, a facility Nicolai once attended as a patient.

== Personal life ==
Elghanayan graduated from USC School of Architecture in 2018 and is currently working full-time at an architecture firm when not racing.

== Motorsports career results ==
=== Lotus Cup USA ===
| Year | Team | Car | Class | 1 | 2 | 3 | 4 | 5 | 6 | 7 | 8 | 9 | 10 | 11 | 12 | 13 | 14 | 15 | 16 | Rank | Points |
|---|---|---|---|---|---|---|---|---|---|---|---|---|---|---|---|---|---|---|---|---|---|
| 2015 | | Lotus Exige | Trophy | CHW; 3 | CHW; 3 | SMM; 3 | SMM; 2 | AUS | AUS | LAG; 3 | LAG; 2 | THU; 1 | THU; 2 | BUT; 1 | BUT; 2 | ACS | ACS | THC | THC | 2nd | 183 |
| 2016 | Muellerized | Lotus Exige | Trophy | WILL; 5 | WILL; 1 | BUT; 1 | BUT; 1 | LAG; 1 | LAG; 1 | THU; 1 | THU; 1 | SMM; 1 | SMM; 3 | SON; 2 | SON; 1 | THC; 1 | THC | | | 1st | |
| 2017 | Marco Polo Motorsports | Lotus Exige | Trophy | AUS; 3 | AUS; 1 | CHW; 2 | CHW; DNS | ACS; 1 | ACS; 1 | SON; 1 | SON; 1 | BUT; 1 | BUT; 1 | BUT; 1 | BUT; 1 | | | | | 1st | |

=== Pirelli World Challenge (Blancpain GT America) ===
| Year | Team | Car | Class | Championship | 1 | 2 | 3 | 4 | 5 | 6 | 7 | 8 | 9 | 10 | 11 | 12 | 13 | 14 | 15 | 16 | 17 | 18 | Rank | Points |
|---|---|---|---|---|---|---|---|---|---|---|---|---|---|---|---|---|---|---|---|---|---|---|---|---|
| 2017 | Muellerized | Lotus Exige | TC | | VIR | VIR | MOS | MOS | LRP | LRP | UMC | UMC | AUS | AUS | LAG; NC | LAG; 13 | | | | | | | | |
| 2018 | Marco Polo Motorsports | KTM X-BOW | GTS | Sprint + SprintX | STP | STP | AUS; 10 | AUS; 6 | VIR | VIR | MOS | MOS | LRP; 1 | LRP; 3 | RAM; 9 | RAM; 13 | POR; NC | POR; 9 | UMC; 12 | UMC; 3 | WGI; 2 | WGI; 5 | 22nd | 80 |
| 2019 | Marco Polo Motorsports | KTM X-BOW | GTS | Sprint | STP; DNS | STP; 6 | LBGP; 8 | VIR; 4 | VIR; 5 | MOS; 1 | MOS; 6 | SON; 7 | SON; 7 | WGI | WGI | RAM | RAM | LAS | LAS | | | | | |

=== KTM X-BOW Battle ===
| Year | Race | Team | Car | Class | R1 Position | R2 Position |
|---|---|---|---|---|---|---|
| 2018 | GT4 Sprint, Misano, Italy | Razoon-More Than Racing | KTM X-BOW | SPX | RET | 2 |

=== 24H Series ===
| Year | Race | Team | Car | Class | Drivers | Overall Position | Position in Class |
|---|---|---|---|---|---|---|---|
| 2019 | Dubai 24 Hour | Reiter Engineering | KTM X-BOW | SPX | Adam Galas (AM); Jan Krabec (AM); Nicolai Elghanayan (SEMI PRO); Benjamin Mazatis (SEMI PRO) | Mech. | Mech. |

=== 2018 GT4 Central European Cup ===
| Year | Race | Team | Car | Class | Drivers | Overall Position | Class Position |
|---|---|---|---|---|---|---|---|
| 2018 | Circuit Zandvoort, Zandvoort, Netherlands | True Racing – Reiter Engineering | #23 KTM X-BOW GT4 | Pro/Am | (Czech Republic) Sergej Pavlovec (Czech Republic) David Klar (Austria) Laura Kraihamer (Norway) Mads Siljehaug (United States) Nicolai Elghanayan | RET | RET |
