= Spring Mountain Motorsports Ranch =

Race track in Nevada, United States

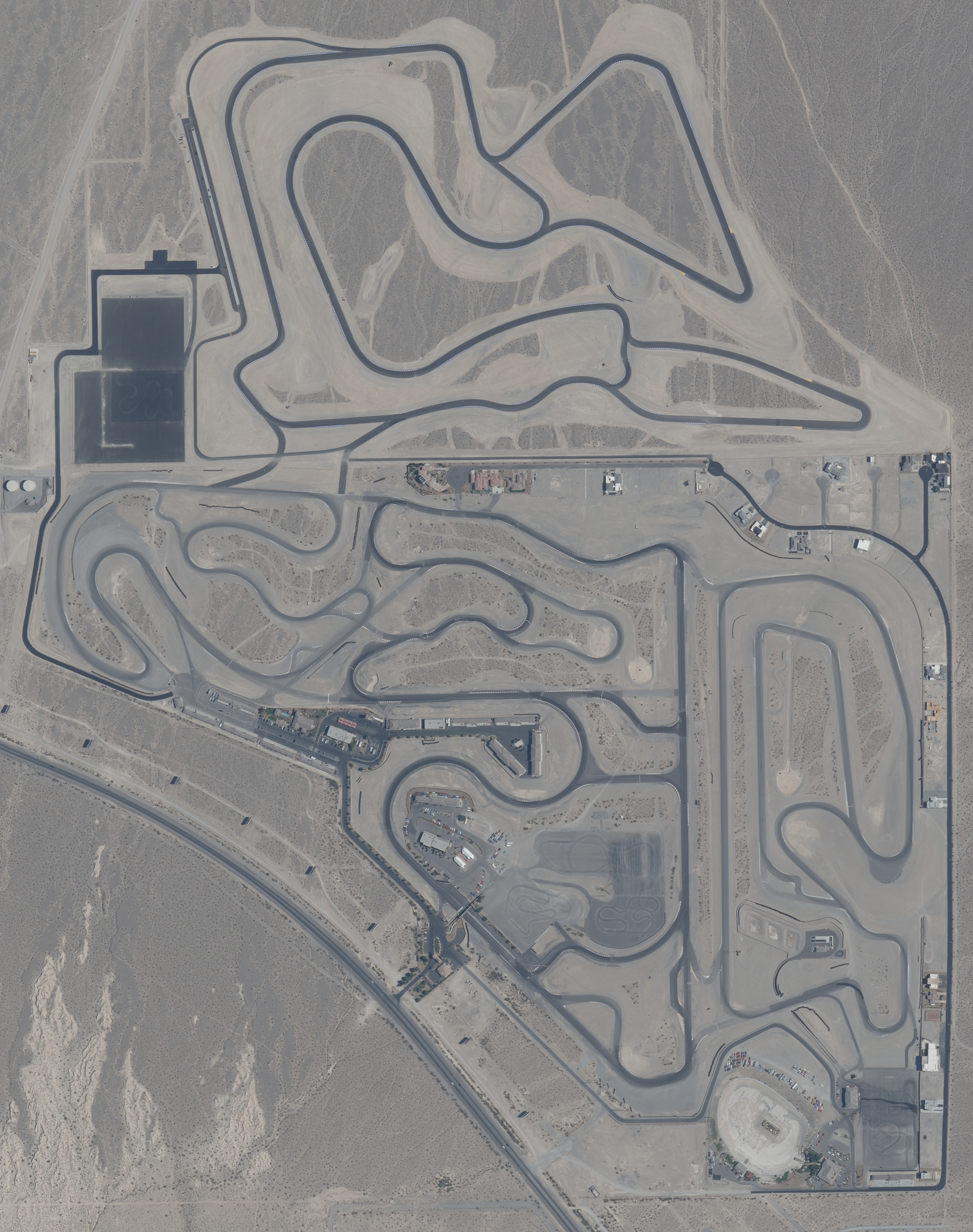
- 2022 aerial photo
- Location: Pahrump, Nevada, United States
- Coordinates: 36°10′17.76″N 115°54′43.20″W
- Owner: Brad Rambo (2004–present)
- Broke ground: 1998
- Opened: 2004
- Major events: Former: Porsche Sprint Challenge North America USA West (2023–2025); Former: Trans-Am West Coast Championship (2023–2024); Radical World Finals (2022)
- Website: http://www.springmountainmotorsports.com/

Long Course (2004–present)
- Length: 9.817 km (6.100 mi)
- Turns: 15

Spring Mountain Motor Resort and Country Club is a race track located in Pahrump, Nevada. Currently owned by John Morris and Brad Rambo, the track hosts various driving schools, track rentals, and is home to a private motorsports country club.

The track length consists of various configurations, the longest being 6.100 mi (9.817 km) as the longest road course in North America. The most common configurations range from 1.500 to 2.400 mi (2.414 to 3.862 km) for the driving schools, with other custom configurations for members and track rentals.

The Ron Fellows Performance Driving School is one of the main events hosted at the track. As "The Official High Performance Driving School of Corvette," the school has 2 and 3-day programs, as well as private instructions, available for drivers of all skill levels. The courses may be taken in a C7 Corvette Stingray, Grand Sport, or Z06. New model year Corvette owners are offered the course at a subsidized rate direct from General Motors.

New to Spring Mountain is the Cadillac V-Performance Academy. As "The Official High Performance Driving School of Cadillac," the school is a 2-day program subsidized for owners of new 2017 Cadillac V-Series models.

The track also hosts Spring Mountain Racing, a maintenance and repair shop for members to keep their Radical and Wolf race cars in top condition before Club racing.

Canadian racer Rupert Bragg-Smith built the first track there in 1998 and then sold it to Morris in 2004.
