= Vortex SAS =

French auto racing team

(France) Vortex SAS
- Founded: 2015
- Base: Pézenas, France
- Team principal(s): Arnaud Gomez; Olivier Gomez
- Current series: 24H Series; Ultimate Cup Series; Campeonato de España de GT
- Former series: Tourisme Trophee Endurance; V de V Endurance Series
- Current drivers: (France) Lionel Amrouche (France) Philippe Bonnel (France) Arnaud Gomez (France) Olivier Gomez (France) Enzo Richer (France) Solenn Amroiche (France) Cyril Calmon
- Teams' Championships: 2 (2021 24H Series GTX) 1 (2024 24H Series GTX)
- Drivers' Championships: 9 (2017 Spanish, 2017 Spanish GT - Class 1, 2017 Spanish GT - Class 3, 2019 Ultimate Cup Challenge GT UGT, 2021 Spanish GT, 2021 24H Series GTX, 2022 Ultimate Cup GT Endurance GT3B, 2022 Ultimate Cup GT Sprint GT3B, 2023 Ultimate Cup GT Endurance GT3B)
- Website: https://www.vortexsas.fr/

Vortex SAS is a French auto racing team founded by brothers Arnaud and Olivier Gomez in 2015. After competing in silhouette race cars for a number of years, the team was created by the Gomez brothers. Competing as Vortex V8, they build and run their own lightweight GT cars that compete in the 24H Series, Ultimate Cup Series and Campeonato de España de GT.

== Racing history ==
=== 2016 ===
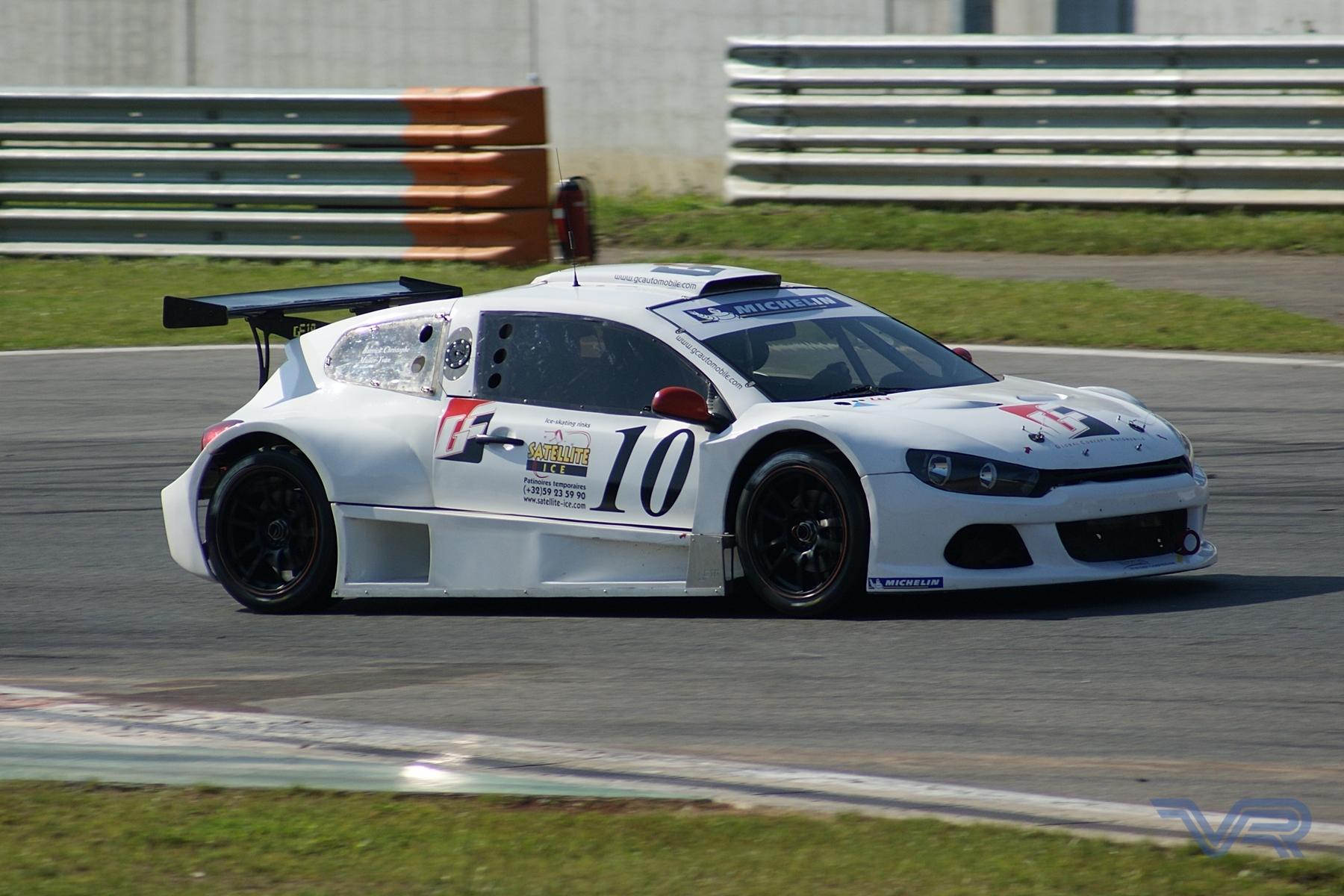
The Scirocco-shaped GC10-V8, with which Vortex SAS made their 24H Series debut in 2016.

The team made their 24H Series debut in 2016 at the season-opening Dubai 24 Hour with a GC10-V8 built by GC Automobile, qualifying on pole in the SP2 class, being the first non-GT3 car on the grid in 18th overall. The car ended the race in 2nd in class, 27th overall.

A podium-less streak followed for the rest of the 2016 season, the team ending their season 4th in class with 69 points, 10th in the overall GT standings.

=== 2017 ===
The team upgraded to a full-season entry for 2017 in both the SPX and SP2 classes. A heavily unsubscribed entry in the former resulted in a lack of competition for the team debuting their Vortex 1.0 car. The team competed in every round except the 12H Imola but struggled to score points throughout the season, only taking 2nd in class at Mugello and the Red Bull Ring in SPX and 3rd at the Italian venue in SP2, ending their season in 4th and 7th in their class standings.

=== 2018 ===
Vortex downsized their operation to just two events in 2018, failing to finish at the 12H Navarra and managing enough laps to be classified as fifth in class at the 24 Hours of Barcelona. The team would end the season fifth, and last, in class.

=== 2019 ===
2019 marked the return of the GC10 which took a maiden win for Vortex SAS in the season-opener at Dubai, whilst the 1.0 SPX entry retired shortly before halfway distance. The GC10 took second at the 12 Hours of Mugello in class in its final race. The 1.0 returned for the 24 Hours of Barcelona for the final round of the European segment of the season, qualifying on pole and finishing in third, one lap clear of the next car.

=== 2020 ===
The 1.0 was entered into the 2020 Dubai 24 Hour into the renamed GTX class. The car only managed 33 laps before the race was called off due to flooding.

=== 2021 ===
Vortex were one of four GTX teams to enter in the first round at Dubai, despite being 100 laps down on the class winner, they took the flag in second position. This result would be succeeded by multiple podium finishes in every subsequent race bar the 24 Hours of Barcelona. The team entered two cars, the No. 701 and No. 712, at 3 rounds throughout the season, Mugello, Paul Ricard and Barcelona.

One highlight of the season was a double podium finish in class at the 12 Hours of Mugello. The No. 701 finished 15th overall and 3rd in class at the 24 Hours of Sebring, thus allowing Philippe Bonnel to secure GTX drivers' and teams' championship for Vortex V8, with 96 points despite not winning a single race. They finished in the GT Teams' standings in 4th, tied with two GT3 teams on 109 points.

=== 2022 ===
At the 2022 edition of the Dubai 24 Hour, mechanical troubles delayed the 701 car almost to the point of non-classification, amassing enough laps to be classified as third in GTX. Three Vortex 1.0s were present for the following championship round at Mugello, the additional No. 703 car taking third place in class whilst the main two cars faltered, still finishing however. The Vortex 1.0s were ultimately out-paced by their GTX competitors, only taking three more podium finishes at Spa-Francorchamps, Barcelona and Kuwait.

=== 2023 ===
After the Middle East Trophy-opening round at Kuwait, the 1.0s were only challenged by Razoon – More than Racing's KTM X-BOW. The cars ran without troubles for most of the event until the No. 702 car caught fire with under four hours to go, being classified in third through its adequate race distance whilst the 701 finished second 59 laps down. At the Trophy-season-closing round at Yas Marina Circuit, the 701 finished in fourth, ending the season 2nd in the GTX standings of the Middle East Trophy, twelve points shy of Razoon – More than Racing.

Upon the season's first race in Europe at the 12 Hours of Mugello, the duo of 1.0 cars ran smoothly, taking the lead and holding it for many hours in both parts of the evenly-split race. Despite both cars having to deal with separate wheel issues, the team finished 1–2 in GTX, 24th and 25th overall respectively, marking the team's second win in the 24H Series.

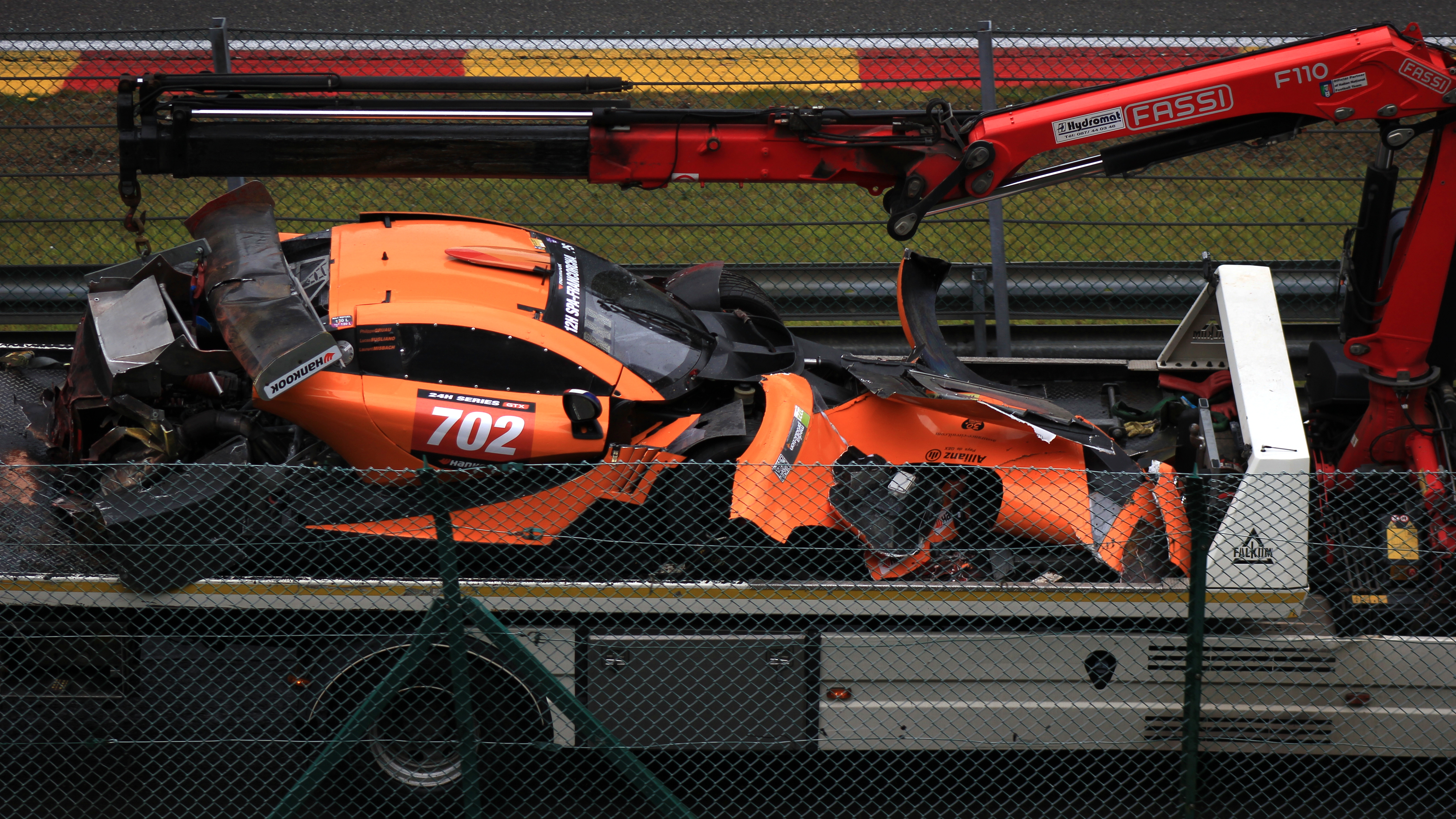
The #702 Vortex 1.0 on a recovery truck after crashing out at Spa-Francorchamps.

After Mugello, the second of the 1.0's crashed in wet conditions at the 12 Hours of Spa-Francorchamps. The #701 finished on the podium at every other race in the European season, making the podium in the 24 Hours of Barcelona after troubles for other class competitors, narrowly missing out on the GTX title by 2 points after dropped scores were applied.

In the Ultimate Cup Series' GT Endurance and Touring Challenge, the pair of 1.0 cars ran with opposition from a Ferrari 488 Challenge, though it was faulted by mechanical troubles and Miguel Moiola was able to seal the 3B title despite the team missing the Estoril round of the series.

=== 2024 ===
Vortex SAS competed in the 2024 edition of the Bathurst 12 Hour with the Vortex 1.0 in the Invitational class, which was the team's first race in Oceania. Lionel Amrouche, Julien Boilot and Philippe Bonnel drove the car in the event. The event took place on 16–18 February, after the Middle East Trophy's conclusion and before the 24H Series' European campaign starts.

Vortex's debut at Bathurst yielded a fourth-place finish in class and 23rd overall after causing a few cautions, mostly due to spins at various points on the track and a lengthy pit stop. Shipping delays prevented the team's first 2.0 chassis from making it to Europe for the opening Ultimate Cup Series and 24H Series rounds, the team resorting to a 1.0 chassis, which gave them a UGTX class win at Paul Ricard with an all-new driver line up and 2nd in the 12 Hours of Mugello in GTX.

The 2.0 model's first European Creventic race came at the 12 Hours of Spa-Francorchamps, in which both cars managed to finish in a 1-2 class formation, lead by the Nr. 701, ahead of their rivals in a soaked two-part event, before which the Nr. 702 took class pole in GTX. The team were the only GTX competitors in the 2024 edition of the 24 Hours of Portimão. Despite a two-hour stay in the pits, the team finished the race albeit 172 laps down, winning their class.

The 701 Vortex took class victory in the 24 Hours of Barcelona, winning the GTX title with very little opposition, giving the 2.0 its first championship crown. A trying Ultimate Cup campaign gave the 2.0 second place, less than two seconds off the leader at Mugello, following an overall win at Magny-Cours by Arnaud and Olivier Gomez. The team had Sébastien Loeb signed for the GT Endurance season finale, entering 3 additional cars in the UCS1 class.

== Cars ==
=== Vortex 1.0 ===
Vortex 1.0
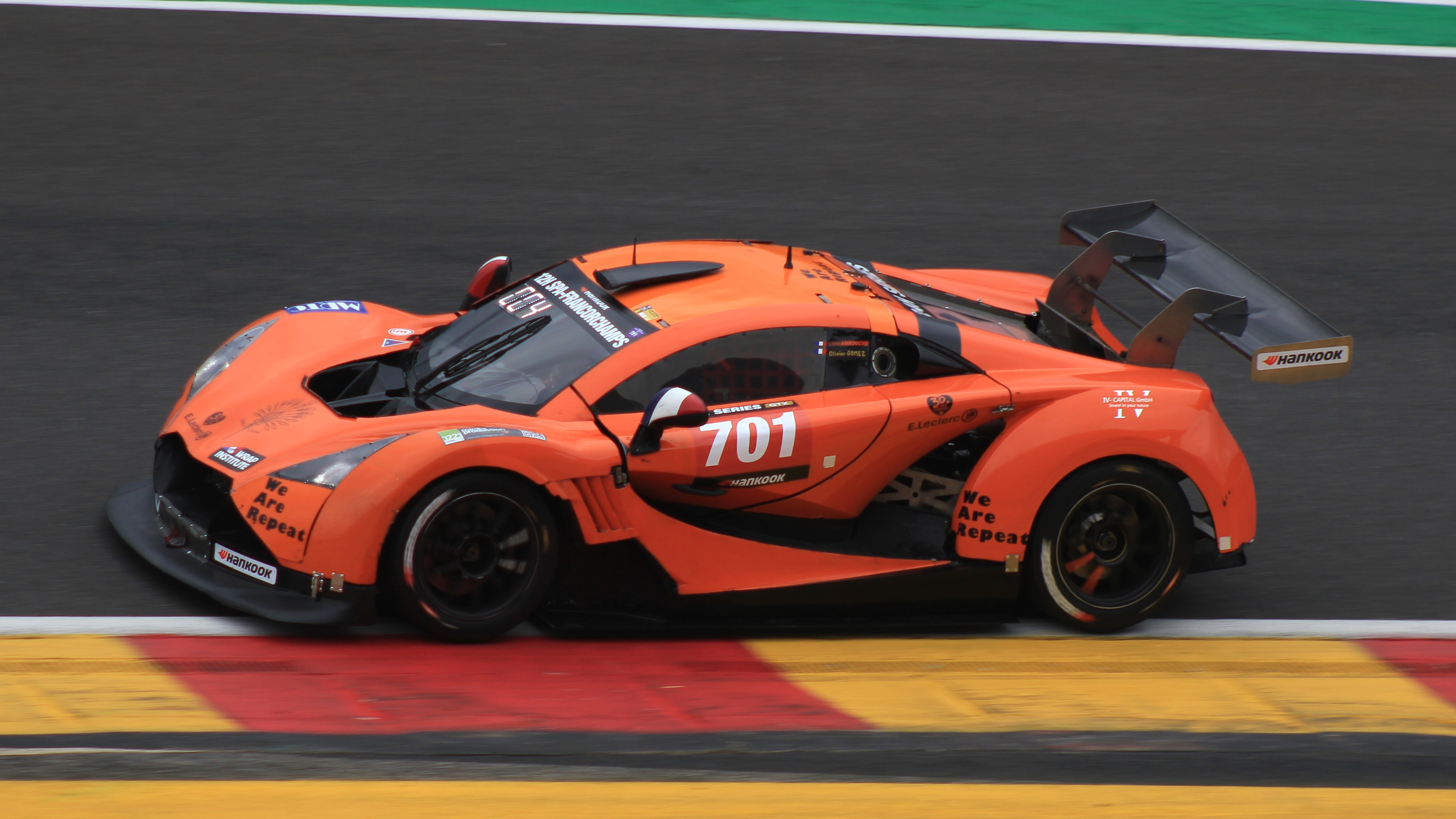
- Constructor: Vortex SAS
- Designers: Arnaud Gomez; Olivier Gomez

Technical specifications
- Chassis: Carbon Monocoque
- Suspension (front): Ohlins double wishbones, shock absorbers, adjustable anti-roll bar
- Suspension (rear): As front
- Engine: Chevrolet LS3 6,162 cc (376 cu in) V8 mid-engined, longitudinally mounted
- Transmission: 6-speed sequential semi-automatic paddle-shift gearbox
- Weight: 1,050 kg (2,310 lb)
- Tyres: Michelin; Hankook

Competition history
- Notable entrants: (France) Vortex V8 (France) GPC Motorsport
- Debut: 2016 4 Hours of Barcelona
- First win: 2017 CER-GT Aragon Race 1
- Last win: 2024 Ultimate Cup GT Endurance Mugello UCS3
- Last event: 2024 Ultimate Cup GT Endurance Paul Ricard UCS3
Races	Wins
153	43 (43 class wins in competition, including six outright wins)
- Teams' Championships: 1 (2021 24H Series GTX)
- Drivers' Championships: 9 (2017 Spanish GT, 2017 Spanish GT - Class 1, 2019 Ultimate Cup Challenge GT UGT, 2021 Spanish GT, 2021 24H Series GTX, 2022 Ultimate Cup GT Endurance GT3B, 2022 Ultimate Cup GT Sprint GT3B, 2023 Ultimate Cup GT Endurance GT3B, 2024 Ultimate Cup GT Endurance UCS3)

The 1.0 would make its competitive debut in the VdeV Endurance Series at Circuit de Barcelona-Catalunya, competing in the 4-hour-long season opener with GPC Motorsport, the #20 car being driven by Iradj Alexander and Alexandre Coigny. After qualifying 20th out of 23 cars, the car would go on to finish in 21st, six laps down on the next car. It would fail to finish the next three races in entered before being pulled from the final trio of events.

Despite not being built to any given class specifications, the car has found its way into many championships, either into classes that are generally open to all GT cars or Open GT-type classes, one example being 24H Series' GTX class which is open to similar cars like the Mustang-shaped MARC II V8.

The Vortex 1.0 has taken championship titles in three of the championships it has taken part in: three in the Ultimate Cup Series, two in the Spanish GT Championship in 2017 and 2021 and one in the 24H Series in 2021.

It is also notable for its unique, independently produced appearance among more popular, conventionally-bodied GT cars it competes against. It is one of the only remaining cars to be built and run in an international championship by the same team, other similar examples including the Brokernet Silver Sting, and the Solution-F-made cars, the Divitec SF11 and Foenix, which all have unique body shapes respectively.

The #701 Vortex 1.0 claimed its first GTX and 24H Series victory at the 2023 12 Hours of Mugello, ending an almost seven-year winless streak.

=== Vortex 2.0 ===
Vortex 2.0
- Constructor: Vortex SAS
- Designers: Arnaud Gomez; Olivier Gomez

Technical specifications
- Chassis: Carbon Monocoque
- Suspension (front): PKM double wishbones with pushrod, adjustable anti-roll bar
- Suspension (rear): As front
- Length: 4,500 mm
- Width: 1,996 mm
- Height: 1,165 mm
- Engine: Chevrolet LS3 6.2 L (6,200 cc; 378 cu in) V8 mid-engined, longitudinally mounted
- Transmission: 6-speed Sadev sequential semi-automatic paddle-shift SLR90 gearbox
- Weight: 1,000 kg (2,200 lb)
- Tyres: Michelin; Hankook

Competition history
- Notable entrants: (France) Vortex V8
- Debut: 2023 12 Hours of Kuwait
- First win: 2024 6 Hours of Abu Dhabi
- Last win: 2025 24 Hours of Barcelona
- Last event: 2025 Ultimate Cup GT Endurance Magny-Cours
Races	Wins	Poles	F/Laps
33	14 (14 class wins, 3 outright win)	14	6
- Teams' Championships: 2 (2024 24H Series GTX, 2025 24H Series GTX)
- Drivers' Championships: 2 (2024 24H Series GTX, 2025 24H Series GTX)

The team's latest innovation was announced as the Vortex 2.0, possessing a more streamlined but similar look to its predecessor. It made its debut in the 2023 24H Series season.

The 2.0 was revealed during the 2023 24 Hours of Barcelona event on 15 September, Friday. The car's improvements from its predecessor include a 120 kg kerb weight drop, PKM suspension and many changes to assist with cooling the brakes and amending many issues the 1.0 had. A full-width rear wing is another complete change, in an effort to improve downforce which is assisted by the bodywork that will help to direct air rearwards. The car is scheduled to debut at the 2023–24 Middle East Trophy-opening 12 Hours of Kuwait round on 8–9 December 2023.

On its event debut, the 2.0 took pole position at the 12 Hours of Kuwait, averaging a time, across all three session, 1.1 seconds quicker than the next GTX car. Following multiple mechanical failures, the car finished 13th overall and third in class on debut. The 2.0 took GTX pole by nearly 7 tenths for the 6 Hours of Abu Dhabi after 3 qualifying sessions ahead of its second race. The 2.0 took its first class win by half a second in the Abu Dhabi race and went on to take pole for the Dubai 24 Hour the next week.

The 2.0 claimed its first overall win at round 5 of the Ultimate Cup GT Endurance season at Magny-Cours.

== Racing record ==
=== Complete 24H Series results ===
(key) (results in bold indicate pole position)

Year	Car	Class	Drivers	No.	1	2	3	4	5	6	7	8	Team Pts.	Team Pos.
2016	GC Automobile GC10-V8	SP2			DUB	MUG	SIL	ZAN	LEC	BAR	BRN			
2016	GC Automobile GC10-V8	SP2	(France) Lionel Amrouche	203	**27**	41		37	17	Ret			69	4th
2016	GC Automobile GC10-V8	SP2	(France) Cyril Calmon	203	**27**	41		37		Ret			69	4th
2016	GC Automobile GC10-V8	SP2	(France) Mathieu Pontais	203	**27**				17				69	4th
2016	GC Automobile GC10-V8	SP2	(France) Alban Varutti	203	**27**								69	4th
2016	GC Automobile GC10-V8	SP2	(France) Franck Leone-Provost	203		41							69	4th
2016	GC Automobile GC10-V8	SP2	(Qatar) Amro Al-Hamad	203				37					69	4th
2016	GC Automobile GC10-V8	SP2	(Senegal) Nagy Kabaz (France) Jérémy Reymond	203					17				69	4th
2016	GC Automobile GC10-V8	SP2	(France) Philippe Burel (France) Philippe Gruau	203						Ret			69	4th
2016	GC Automobile GC10.2-V6	SP-Touring	(France) Lionel Amrouche (France) Cyril Calmon (France) Jérémy Reymond (Switzerland) Kurt Thiel	203			17						NC	0
2017	Vortex 1.0	SPX (Note: The SPX class was merged with the A6-Pro and A6-Am class from round 2 onwards due to lack of entries.)			DUB	MUG	RBR	LEC	IMO	ALG	COA			
2017	Vortex 1.0	SPX	(France) Lionel Amrouche (France) Cyril Calmon	204	Ret	Ret	27	Ret		Ret			15	4th
2017	Vortex 1.0	SPX	(France) Arnaud Gomez	204	Ret	Ret							15	4th
2017	Vortex 1.0	SPX	(France) Olivier Gomez	204	Ret								15	4th
2017	Vortex 1.0	SPX	(France) Philippe Gruau	204		Ret							15	4th
2017	Vortex 1.0	SPX	(Belgium) Amaury Bonduel	204			27	Ret					15	4th
2017	Vortex 1.0	SPX	(Monaco) Alain Costa	204				Ret					15	4th
2017	Vortex 1.0	SPX	(Denmark) Martin Hald Gøtsche (Denmark) Nanna Hald Gøtsche	204						Ret			15	4th
2017	GC Automobile GC10-V8	SP2	(Germany) Günther Deutsch (Germany) Marco Deutsch (France) Mathieu Pontais (Switzerland) Kurt Thiel	203	Ret								16	7th
2017	GC Automobile GC10-V8	SP2	(Denmark) Martin Hald Gøtsche (Denmark) Nanna Hald Gøtsche	203		17		Ret	DNS				16	7th
2017	GC Automobile GC10-V8	SP2	(Switzerland) Florian Revaz	203		17							16	7th
2017	GC Automobile GC10-V8	SP2	(Russia) Maxim Aronov (Russia) Lev Fridman (France) Jean Christophe Rey	203				Ret					16	7th
2017	GC Automobile GC10-V8	SP2	(France) Lionel Amrouche	203					DNS				16	7th
2018	Vortex 1.0	SPX			DUB	SIL	NAV	IMO	POR	BAR	SPA	COA		
2018	Vortex 1.0	SPX	(France) Lionel Amrouche (France) Philippe Gruau (France) Philippe Valenza	204			Ret						4	5th
2018	Vortex 1.0	SPX	(France) Julien Boillot (France) Philippe Burel (France) Stephane Cottrell (Portugal) Victor Fernandes	204						36			4	5th
2019 2019	Vortex 1.0	SPX			DUB	MUG	SPA	BRN	POR	BAR	COA			
2019 2019	Vortex 1.0	SPX	(France) Arnaud Gomez (France) Olivier Gomez (France) Alban Varutti	701	Ret								16	NC
2019 2019	Vortex 1.0	SPX	(France) Stephane Cottrell (France) Philippe Gruau (Spain) Francesc Gutierrez Agüi (Switzerland) Nicolas Nobs	701						25			16	NC
2019 2019	GC Automobile GC10.2-V6	SP3	(France) Philippe Bonnel (France) Franck Lefèvre (Switzerland) Nicolas Nobs	301	47	39							28 (Note: Vortex V8 scored 28 points in the Continents' Championship (Dubai) and 11 in the Europe championship (Mugello), however did not score a final championship as they only competed in one race in each season.) 11	NC NC
2019 2019	GC Automobile GC10.2-V6	SP3	(France) Thomas Cordelier	301	47								28 11	NC NC
2020	Vortex 1.0	GTX			DUB	POR	MNZ	HOC	PER	MUG				
2020	Vortex 1.0	GTX	(France) Julien Boillot (France) Philippe Bonnel (France) Arnaud Gomez (France) Olivier Gomez	701	Ret								0	NC
2021	Vortex 1.0	GTX			DUB	MUG	LEC	HOC	BAR	HUN	SEB			
2021	Vortex 1.0	GTX	(France) Lionel Amrouche (Switzerland) Karen Gaillard	701	35	30			21				109	1st
2021	Vortex 1.0	GTX	(France) Philippe Bonnel	701	35			22		13	15		109	1st
2021	Vortex 1.0	GTX	(France) Alban Varutti	701	35								109	1st
2021	Vortex 1.0	GTX	(France) Boris Gimond	701		30					15		109	1st
2021	Vortex 1.0	GTX	(France) Bastien Gouret	701			15	22					109	1st
2021	Vortex 1.0	GTX	(France) Philippe Gruau	701			15		21				109	1st
2021	Vortex 1.0	GTX	(France) Olivier Gomez	701			15						109	1st
2021	Vortex 1.0	GTX	(Switzerland) Nicolas Nobs	701				22		13			109	1st
2021	Vortex 1.0	GTX	(France) Arnaud Gomez	701				22					109	1st
2021	Vortex 1.0	GTX	(France) Franck Leone-Provost	701					21				109	1st
2021	Vortex 1.0	GTX	(France) Gilles Courtois	701						13			109	1st
2021	Vortex 1.0	GTX	(France) "Steve Brooks" (France) Sébastien Lajoux	701							15		109	1st
2021	Vortex 1.0	GTX	(France) Philippe Bonnel (Switzerland) Nicolas Nobs	712		23	19		22				39	4th
2021	Vortex 1.0	GTX	(France) Pierre Fontaine	712		23	19						39	4th
2021	Vortex 1.0	GTX	(France) Boris Gimond (France) Sébastien Lajoux	712					22				39	4th
2022	Vortex 1.0	GTX			DUB	MUG	SPA	HOC	POR	BAR	KUW			
2022	Vortex 1.0	GTX	(France) Lionel Amrouche (France) Philippe Bonnel	701	70	38	21	23	19	**34**	15		47 (Note: Vortex V8 #701 scored 47 points in the Continents' Championship (Dubai, best European race, Spa-Francorchamps, and Kuwait) and 44 in the Europe championship (Mugello, Spa-Francorchamps, Hockenheimring, Portimão and Barcelona).) 44	2nd 3rd
2022	Vortex 1.0	GTX	(France) Sébastien Lajoux	701	70	38	21	23					47 44	2nd 3rd
2022	Vortex 1.0	GTX	(France) Philippe Gruau	701	70								47 44	2nd 3rd
2022	Vortex 1.0	GTX	(France) Olivier Gomez	701					19	**34**			47 44	2nd 3rd
2022	Vortex 1.0	GTX	(France) Arnaud Gomez (France) Lucas Lasserre	701						**34**			47 44	2nd 3rd
2022	Vortex 1.0	GTX	(France) Nicolas Nobs	701							15		47 44	2nd 3rd
2022	Vortex 1.0	GTX	(France) Gilles Courtois	702		34	Ret						16 (Note: Vortex V8 #702 scored 16 points in the Continents' Championship (best European race, Mugello) but wasn't classified and 26 in the Europe championship (Mugello, Spa-Francorchamps, and Barcelona).) 26	NC 4th
2022	Vortex 1.0	GTX	(Switzerland) Nicolas Nobs	702		34				31			16 26	NC 4th
2022	Vortex 1.0	GTX	(France) Patrick Brochier	702		34							16 26	NC 4th
2022	Vortex 1.0	GTX	(France) Philippe Gruau	702			Ret			31			16 26	NC 4th
2022	Vortex 1.0	GTX	(France) Boris Gimonnd	702			Ret						16 26	NC 4th
2022	Vortex 1.0	GTX	(France) Lionel Amrouche (France) Philippe Bonnel (Spain) Francesc Gutierrez Agüi	702						31			16 26	NC 4th
2022	Vortex 1.0	GTX	(France) Christophe Decultot (France) Pierre Fontaine (France) Philippe Gruau	703		27							11 (Note: Vortex V8 #703 scored 11 points in the Europe championship but wasn't classified as it only contested one race.)	NC
2023	Vortex 1.0	GTX			MUG	SPA	MNZ	EST		BAR				
2023	Vortex 1.0	GTX	(France) Lionel Amrouche	701	24	40	22	18	15	24	20		172	2nd
2023	Vortex 1.0	GTX	(France) Philippe Bonnel	701	24		22	18	15	24	20		172	2nd
2023	Vortex 1.0	GTX	(France) Philippe Gruau	701	24								172	2nd
2023	Vortex 1.0	GTX	(France) Olivier Gomez	701		40							172	2nd
2023	Vortex 1.0	GTX	(France) Gilles Courtois	701			22	18	15				172	2nd
2023	Vortex 1.0	GTX	(France) Miguel Moiola (France) Lucas Sugliano	701						24	20		172	2nd
2023	Vortex 1.0	GTX	(France) Laurent Misbach (France) Lucas Sugliano	702	25	Ret							66	5th
2023	Vortex 1.0	GTX	(France) Pierre Fontaine	702	25								66	5th
2023	Vortex 1.0	GTX	(France) Philippe Gruau	702		Ret				30	31		66	5th
2023	Vortex 1.0	GTX	(France) Solenn Amrouche (France) Julien Boillot (France) Stéphane Cottrell	702						30	31		66	5th
2024	Vortex 1.0 1 Vortex 2.0 4	GTX			MUG	SPA	POR		MIS	BAR				
2024	Vortex 1.0 1 Vortex 2.0 4	GTX	(France) Lionel Amrouche (France) Philippe Bonnel (France) Gilles Courtois	701	31	33	**18**	**15**	**20**†	26	22		200	1st
2024	Vortex 1.0 1 Vortex 2.0 4	GTX	(France) Lucas Sugliano	701	31		**18**	**15**					200	1st
2024	Vortex 1.0 1 Vortex 2.0 4	GTX	(France) Solenn Amrouche	701						26	22		200	1st
2024	Vortex 2.0	GTX	(France) Lucas Sugliano	702		**36**				31	29†		84	2nd
2024	Vortex 2.0	GTX	(France) Arnaud Gomez (France) Olivier Gomez	702		**36**							84	2nd
2024	Vortex 2.0	GTX	(France) Cyril Calmon (France) Pierre Fontaine (France) Miguel Moiola	702						31	29†		84	2nd
2025	Vortex 2.0	GTX			MUG	SPA	MIS	LEC	BAR					
2025	Vortex 2.0	GTX	(France) Lionel Amrouche (France) Philippe Bonnel (France) Cyril Calmon	701	28	17†	**18**	27	20	18			176	1st
2025	Vortex 2.0	GTX	(France) Gilles Courtois	701					20	18			176	1st
2025	Vortex 2.0	GTX	(France) Olivier Gomez	701					20	18			176	1st
2025	Vortex 2.0	GTX	(France) Olivier Gomez	702	**11**								108	2nd
2025	Vortex 2.0	GTX	(France) Arnaud Gomez	702	**11**								108	2nd
2025	Vortex 2.0	GTX	(France) Lionel Amrouche (France) Julien Boillot (France) Alexandre De Bernardinis	702		23							108	2nd
2025	Vortex 2.0	GTX	(France) Solenn Amrouche (France) Philippe Burel (France) Franck Lefèvre	702				29					108	2nd
2025	Vortex 2.0	GTX	(France) Arnaud Gomez (France) Olivier Gomez (France) Tom Pieri	703				Ret					0	NC
2025	Vortex 2.0	GTX	(France) Lionel Amrouche (France) Solenn Amrouche (France) Olivier Gomez (France) Yoann Olivar (France) Arnaud Tsamere	974					**21**	**21**			0	NC

* Season still in progress.

=== Complete Middle East Trophy results ===
(key) (results in bold indicate pole position)

Year	Car	Class	Drivers	No.	1	2	3	Team Pts.	Team Pos.
2022–23	Vortex 1.0	GTX			KUW	DUB	ABU		
2022–23	Vortex 1.0	GTX	(France) Lionel Amrouche (France) Philippe Bonnel	701	15	34	20	100	2nd
2022–23	Vortex 1.0	GTX	(Switzerland) Nicholas Nobs	701	15			100	2nd
2022–23	Vortex 1.0	GTX	(France) Philippe Gruau (France) Tom Pieri	701		34		100	2nd
2022–23	Vortex 1.0	GTX	(France) Julien Boillot	701			20	100	2nd
2022–23	Vortex 1.0	GTX	(France) Philippe Fertoret (France) Miguel Moiola (Switzerland) Nicolas Nobs (France) Lucas Sugliano	702		38		0	NC
2023–24	Vortex 2.0	GTX			KUW	ABU	DUB		
2023–24	Vortex 2.0	GTX	(France) Lionel Amrouche (France) Philippe Bonnel (France) Arnaud Gomez (France) Olivier Gomez	701	**13**	**19**	**30**	76	2nd
2025	Vortex 2.0	GTX			DUB		ABU		
2025	Vortex 2.0	GTX	(France) Lionel Amrouche (France) Philippe Bonnel (France) Gilles Courtois	701	46	51†	43†	50	2nd
2025	Vortex 2.0	GTX	(France) Solenn Amrouche	701	46	51†		50	2nd
2025	Vortex 2.0	GTX	(France) Arnaud Gomez (France) Olivier Gomez	702			DNS	0	NC

* Season still in progress.

=== Complete Ultimate Cup Series results ===
==== Endurance ====
(key) (results in bold indicate pole position)

Year	Car	Class	Drivers	No.	1	2	3	4	5	6	7	Driver Pts.	Driver Pos.	Team Pts.	Team Pos.
2019	Vortex 1.0	UGT			EST	DIJ	SVK	MUG	VAL	MAG	LEC				
2019	Vortex 1.0	UGT	(France) Philippe Bonnel (France) Frank Lefevre	701	**5**	**5**		**6**	**4**	**7**	**12**	200	1st	N/A	
2019	Vortex 1.0	UGT	(France) Arnaud Gomez	701	**5**							50	3rd	N/A	
2019	Vortex 1.0	UGT	(Switzerland) Nicolas Nobs	701		**5**		**6**	**4**	**4**		100	2nd	N/A	
2019	Vortex 1.0	UGT	(France) Olivier Gomez	701							**12**	50	3rd	N/A	
2021	Vortex 1.0	UGT3B			LEC1	DIJ	LEC2	BUG	MAG	EST					
2021	Vortex 1.0	UGT3B	(Switzerland) Karen Gaillard	701		20	7					30	7th	42.5	14th
2021	Vortex 1.0	UGT3B	(France) Gilles Courtois	701		20		20	Ret			27	8th	42.5	14th
2021	Vortex 1.0	UGT3B	(Switzerland) Philippe Gaillard	701		20						15	10th	42.5	14th
2021	Vortex 1.0	UGT3B	(France) Lionel Amrouche (France) Boris Gimond	701			7					15	10th	42.5	14th
2021	Vortex 1.0	UGT3B	(France) Patrick Brochier	701				20	Ret			12	11th	42.5	14th
2021	Vortex 1.0	UGT3B	(France) Frank Lefevre	701				20				12	11th	42.5	14th
2021	Vortex 1.0	UGT3B	(France) Alex Di Bernardini	701					Ret			0	NC	42.5	14th
2021	Vortex 1.0	UGT3B	(France) Patrick Brochier (France) Gilles Courtois (France) Stephane Gervais	702		Ret						0	NC	42.5	14th
2021	Vortex 1.0	UGT3B	(France) Sébastien Lajoux	712		7	10	14	Ret			52	4th	42.5	14th
2021	Vortex 1.0	UGT3B	(France) Philippe Bonnel (Switzerland) Nicolas Nobs	712		7	10	14				52	4th	42.5	14th
2021	Vortex 1.0	UGT3B	(France) Laurène Godey (France) Sébastien Loeb	712					Ret			0	NC	42.5	14th
2022	Vortex 1.0	UGT3B			LEC1	NAV	MIS	HOC	MAG	LEC2					
2022	Vortex 1.0	UGT3B	(France) Lucas Sugliano	701	17	5	**8**	7	DSQ	**16**		154	1st	87.5	6th
2022	Vortex 1.0	UGT3B	(France) Miguel Moiola	701	17	5	**8**					93	4th	87.5	6th
2022	Vortex 1.0	UGT3B	(France) Philippe Bonnel	701	17	5		7	DSQ	**16**		129	2nd	87.5	6th
2022	Vortex 1.0	UGT3B	(France) Cyril Calmon	701			**8**		DSQ	**16**		93	3rd	87.5	6th
2022	Vortex 1.0	UGT3B	(France) Vincent Congnet	701				7				75	5th	87.5	6th
2022	Vortex 1.0	UGT3B	(France) Vincent Congnet	702					DSQ	9		75	5th	87.5	6th
2022	Vortex 1.0	UGT3B	(France) Christophe Decultot (France) Pierre Fontaine	702					DSQ	9		50	7th	87.5	6th
2022	Vortex 1.0	UGT3B	(France) Cyril Calmon	703	9	6						93	3rd	87.5	6th
2022	Vortex 1.0	UGT3B	(France) Sébastien Lajoux	703	9	6						61	6th	87.5	6th
2022	Vortex 1.0	UGT3B	(France) Lionel Amrouche	703	9					Ret		25	10th	87.5	6th
2022	Vortex 1.0	UGT3B	(France) Philippe Gruau	703		6						36	9th	87.5	6th
2022	Vortex 1.0	UGT3B	(France) Solenn Amrouche	703						Ret		0	NC	87.5	6th
2022	Vortex 1.0	UGT3B	(France) Miguel Moiola	703						Ret		93	4th	87.5	6th
2023	Vortex 1.0	3B			LEC1	NAV	HOC	EST	MAG	LEC2					
2023	Vortex 1.0	3B	(France) Miguel Moiola	701	8	6	**6**		**5**	**10**		137.5	1st	68.75	7th
2023	Vortex 1.0	3B	(France) Vincent Congnet	701	8		**6**		**5**			75	4th	68.75	7th
2023	Vortex 1.0	3B	(France) Cyril Calmon	701	8					**10**		50	7th	68.75	7th
2023	Vortex 1.0	3B	(France) Lorina Padovani	701		6						91.5	2nd	68.75	7th
2023	Vortex 1.0	3B	(France) Philippe Gruau	701		6						37.5	11th	68.75	7th
2023	Vortex 1.0	3B	(France) Philippe Bonnel	701			**6**		**5**	**10**		75	4th	68.75	7th
2023	Vortex 1.0	3B	(France) Solenn Amrouche	702	11		Ret		7	18		54	6th	68.75	7th
2023	Vortex 1.0	3B	(France) Lorina Padovani	702	11		WD		7	18		91.5	2nd	68.75	7th
2023	Vortex 1.0	3B	(France) Antoine Rizzo	702	11					18		36	12th	68.75	7th
2023	Vortex 1.0	3B	(France) Arnaud Gomez	702		**7**	Ret					27	13th	68.75	7th
2023	Vortex 1.0	3B	(France) Lionel Amrouche	702		**7**			7			45	9th	68.75	7th
2023	Vortex 1.0	3B	(France) Olivier Gomez	702		**7**						27	13th	68.75	7th
2024	Vortex 2.0	UCS1			LEC1	ALG	HOC	MUG	MAG	LEC2					
2024	Vortex 2.0	UCS1	(France) Olivier Gomez	20		**Ret**	**Ret**	**2**	**1**	9		58	3rd	62.5*	3rd*
2024	Vortex 2.0	UCS1	(France) Arnaud Gomez	20		**Ret**	**Ret**	**2**	**1**			43	6th	62.5*	3rd*
2024	Vortex 2.0	UCS1	(France) Sébastien Loeb	20						9		15	10th	62.5*	3rd*
2024	Vortex 2.0	UCS1	(France) Cyril Calmon	21	WD	4				Ret		18	8th	62.5*	3rd*
2024	Vortex 2.0	UCS1	(France) Philippe Bonnel	21	WD					Ret		0	NC	62.5*	3rd*
2024	Vortex 2.0	UCS1	(France) Miguel Moiola	21	WD							0	NC	62.5*	3rd*
2024	Vortex 2.0	UCS1	(France) Solenn Amrouche	21		4			11†			33	7th	62.5*	3rd*
2024	Vortex 2.0	UCS1	(France) Lionel Amrouche	21				DNS	11†			15	11th	62.5*	3rd*
2024	Vortex 2.0	UCS1	(France) Vincent Congnet	21				DNS				0	NC	62.5*	3rd*
2024	Vortex 2.0	UCS1	(France) Pierre Fontaine	21				DNS				0	NC	62.5*	3rd*
2024	Vortex 2.0	UCS1	(France) Laurene Godey	21						Ret		0	NC	62.5*	3rd*
2024	Vortex 2.0	UCS1	(France) Vincent Congnet	22					DNS	Ret		0	NC	62.5*	3rd*
2024	Vortex 2.0	UCS1	(France) Philippe Bonnel	22					DNS			0	NC	62.5*	3rd*
2024	Vortex 2.0	UCS1	(France) Pierre Fontaine	22				DNS		Ret		0	NC	62.5*	3rd*
2024	Vortex 2.0	UCS1	(France) Philippe Fertoret (France) Miguel Moiola	22						Ret		0	NC	62.5*	3rd*
2024	Vortex 1.0	UCS2	(France) Christophe Derouineau (France) Stéphane Gouverneur (France) Jimmy Luminier	701	6	**7**	**8**	**10**†	8	**Ret**		118	1st	62.5*	3rd*
2025	Vortex 2.0	UCS1			LEC1	MUG	ALG	ARA	MAG	LEC2					
2025	Vortex 2.0	UCS1	(France) Roland Marchix (France) Enzo Richer	20	11	Ret	Ret	5	9			45*	5th*	101*	1st*
2025	Vortex 2.0	UCS1	(France) Philippe Papin	20	11							15*	14th*	101*	1st*
2025	Vortex 2.0	UCS1	(France) Ethan Pharamond	20			Ret					0*	NC*	101*	1st*
2025	Vortex 2.0	UCS1	(France) Philippe Bonnel	21	8	14†	12†	Ret				43*	6th*	101*	1st*
2025	Vortex 2.0	UCS1	(France) Philippe Burel (France) Laurent Delesalle	21	8							18*	13th*	101*	1st*
2025	Vortex 2.0	UCS1	(France) Lionel Amrouche	21		14†	Ret	12†	Ret			25*	9th*	101*	1st*
2025	Vortex 2.0	UCS1	(France) Julien Boillot	21			Ret					0*	NC*	101*	1st*
2025	Vortex 2.0	UCS1	(France) Arnaud Gomez (France) Olivier Gomez	22	Ret		**1**	1	2			68	2nd*	101*	1st*

* Season still in progress.

==== Sprint ====
(key) (results in bold indicate pole position)

Year	Car	Class	Drivers	No.	1	2	3	4	5	6	7	8	9	10	11	12	13	14	15	16	17	18	19	20	21	22	23	24	Driver Pts.	Driver Pos.	Team Pts.	Team Pos.
2021	Vortex 1.0	UGT3B			LEC1				DIJ				LEC2				BUG				MAG				EST							
2021	Vortex 1.0	UGT3B	(Switzerland) Karen Gaillard	701					17	DNS	4	DNS	**9**		**10**	**9**													44	2nd	80	9th
2021	Vortex 1.0	UGT3B	(France) Lionel Amrouche	701										**Ret**	**10**	**9**													16	6th	80	9th
2021	Vortex 1.0	UGT3B	(France) Olivier Gomez	712					4	DNS	DNS	DNS																	8	10th	80	9th
2021	Vortex 1.0	UGT3B	(France) Sébastien Lajoux	712									11	DNS	13	DNS													12	8th	80	9th
2022	Vortex 1.0	UGT3B			LEC1			NAV			MIS			HOC			MAG			LEC2												
2022	Vortex 1.0	UGT3B	(France) Alex Di Bernardini	70	DSQ																								0	NC	236	3rd
2022	Vortex 1.0	UGT3B	(France) Solenn Amrouche	70		14	10																						0	NC	236	3rd
2022	Vortex 1.0	UGT3B	(France) Jeremy Faligand	70					Ret	6	10	9	8	**6**	7	7	14	11	8	14	14	14							204	1st	236	3rd
2022	Vortex 1.0	UGT3B	(France) Maxime Rizzo	70				5		6																			0	NC	236	3rd
2022	Vortex 1.0	UGT3B	(France) Lugas Sugliano	71				**2**		DNS							11		14										44	6th	236	3rd
2022	Vortex 1.0	UGT3B	(France) Miguel Moiola	71					**1**	DNS																			0	NC	236	3rd
2022	Vortex 1.0	UGT3B	(Switzerland) Nicolas Nobs	71														13	14										0	NC	236	3rd
2023	Vortex 1.0	UGT3B			LEC1			NAV			HOC			EST			MAG			LEC2												
2023	Vortex 1.0	UGT3B	(France) Lionel Amrouche	702				7		8																			48	9th	48	16th
2023	Vortex 1.0	UGT3B	(France) Olivier Gomez	702					Ret	8																			30	12th	48	16th
2024	Vortex 1.0	UCS3			LEC1				ALG				HOC				MUG				MAG				LEC2							
2024	Vortex 1.0	UCS3	(France) Solenn Amrouche	95	11	10	12	DNS	6	DNS	Ret	DNS	12	13	Ret	DNS													23*	9th*	40*	16th*

=== Complete Campeonato de España de GT results ===
(key) (results in bold indicate pole position)

Year	Car	Class	Drivers	No.	1	2	3	4	5	6	7	8	9	10	11	Driver Pts.	Driver Pos.
2016	GC Automobile GC10-V8	GT			BAR	NAV	ARA	VAL	JAR								
2016	GC Automobile GC10-V8	GT	(France) Philippe Gruau	104	44		5	Ret								57.6	3rd
2016	GC Automobile GC10-V8	GT	(France) Nicolas Nobs	104	44											10	15th
2016	GC Automobile GC10-V8	GT	(Spain) Antonio Castillo (France) Desire Torres	104		9										21.6	11th
2016	GC Automobile GC10-V8	GT	(France) Lionel Amrouche	104			5	Ret	2							50.4	4th
2016	GC Automobile GC10-V8	GT	(France) Olivier Gomez	104					2							25.2	8th
2016	GC Automobile GC10-V8	GT	(Spain) Antonio Castillo (France) Desire Torres	105	Ret		Ret									21.6	11th
2016	GC Automobile GC10-V8	GT	(France) Philippe Gruau	105					3							57.6	3rd
2016	GC Automobile GC10-V8	GT	(France) Arnaud Gomez	105					3							22.4	10th
2017	GC Automobile GC10-V8	C1			VAL	ARA		JAR	BAR	NAV							
2017	GC Automobile GC10-V8	C1	(France) Philippe Gruau	103	7											162	1st
2017	GC Automobile GC10-V8	C1	(France) Stephane Cottrel	103	7											56.4	4th
2017	Vortex 1.0	C1	(France) Philippe Gruau	103		**1**	**2**	Ret	42	2	3					162	1st
2017	Vortex 1.0	C1	(France) Arnaud Gomez	103		**1**	**2**									50.2	5th
2017	Vortex 1.0	C1	(France) Stephane Cottrel	103				Ret	42							56.4	4th
2017	Vortex 1.0	C1	(France) Lionel Amrouche	103						2	3					0	NC
2017	GC Automobile GC10.2-V6	C3	(Switzerland) Nicolas Nobs	104	24	**17**	Ret	13	23	**26**	**18**					175.2	1st
2017	GC Automobile GC10.2-V6	C3	(France) Arnaud Gomez	104	24											39.6	8th
2017	GC Automobile GC10.2-V6	C3	(France) Olivier Gomez	104		**17**	Ret									22.4	9th
2017	GC Automobile GC10.2-V6	C3	(France) Gilles Courtois	104					23	**26**	**18**					79.6	5th
2018	Vortex 1.0	C1			VAL	ARA		NAV		JAR		BAR					
2018	Vortex 1.0	C1	(France) Philippe Gruau	101	EX											91	4th
2018	Vortex 1.0	C1	(France) Stephane Cottrell	101	EX											0	NC
2018	Vortex 1.0	C1	(France) Lionel Amrouche	102	6	2	2	7	2			Ret				134.2	2nd
2018	Vortex 1.0	C1	(Spain) Philippe Valenza	102	6							Ret				43.2	5th
2018	Vortex 1.0	C1	(France) Philippe Gruau	102		2	2	7	2							91	4th
2018	GC Automobile GC10.2-V6	C3	(Switzerland) Nicolas Nobs	101						9	6					39.2	7th
2019	Vortex 1.0	C1			NAV		ARA		VAL		JAR		BAR				
2019	Vortex 1.0	C1	(France) Philippe Gruau	101	4	Ret	2	Ret	DNS	DNS	6	DNS				76.4	5th
2019	Vortex 1.0	C1	(France) Arnaud Gomez	101			2	Ret								76.4	5th
2019	Vortex Light	C2	(France) Arnaud Gomez (France) Olivier Gomez	100									6			0	NC
2020	Vortex 1.0	C1			NAV		VAL		JER		BAR		ARA				
2020	Vortex 1.0	C1	(France) Philippe Bonnel (Switzerland) Nicolas Nobs	135							6					30.8	5th
2020	Vortex 1.0	C1	(France) Arnaud Gomez (France) Philippe Gruau	136	11	3	3	4	5	**Ret**	3	9	3			203.6	2nd
2020	Vortex Light	C3	(Switzerland) Karen Gaillard	134	6	8										60	4th
2020	Vortex Light	C3	(France) Patrick Brochier (France) Gilles Courtois	134			9	9	9	8	7	8	9			166.4	2nd
2020	Vortex Light	C3	(France) Philippe Bonnel (Switzerland) Nicolas Nobs	135	10	6										50	7th
2020	Vortex Light	C3	(France) Lionel Amrouche	135			6	5								60	4th
2021	Vortex 1.0	C1			NAV		ARA		VAL		JER		BAR				
2021	Vortex 1.0	C1	(France) Lionel Amrouche	102	6	6	2	3	6	6	Ret	DNS	7			156	5th
2021	Vortex 1.0	C1	(France) Philippe Gruau	102	6	6	2	3	6	6	Ret	DNS				156	5th
2021	Vortex 1.0	C1	(France) Sebastien Lajoux	102									7			0	NC
2021	Vortex 1.0	C1	(France) Arnaud Gomez (France) Olivier Gomez	112	1	1			**2**	1	2	4	4			272	1st
2021	Vortex 1.0	C1	(France) Patrick Brochier (Switzerland) Nicolas Nobs	122									8			0	NC
2022	Vortex 1.0	C1			VAL		ALG		ARA		JER	NAV		BAR			
2022	Vortex 1.0	C1	(France) Philippe Gruau	112								6	6	DNS		22.4	4th
2022	Vortex 1.0	C1	(France) Solenn Amrouche	112								6	6			22.4	5th
2022	Vortex 1.0	C1	(France) Arnaud Gomez	112										DNS		0	NC
2023	Vortex 1.0	GPX			NAV		ALG		ARA		VAL		JER		BAR		
2023	Vortex 1.0	GPX	(France) Solenn Amrouche	101	3	C	11	11	**7**	7	1	7	Ret	8	**2**	126.4	2nd
2023	Vortex 1.0	GPX	(France) Lionel Amrouche	101	3	C			**7**	7	1	7	Ret	8		84	4th
2023	Vortex 1.0	GPX	(Switzerland) Nicolas Nobs	101			11	11								51.2	6th
2023	Vortex 1.0	GPX	(France) Arnaud Gomez	101											**2**	0	NC
2023	Vortex 1.0	GPX	(Switzerland) Nicolas Nobs	102	8	C			14	17						51.2	6th
2023	Vortex 1.0	GPX	(France) Philippe Gruau	102	8	C							Ret	17	Ret	76.8	5th
2023	Vortex 1.0	GPX	(France) Philippe Bonnel	102	WD	WD			**7**	7						16	12th
2023	Vortex 1.0	GPX	(France) Gilles Courtois	102									Ret	17		10	13th
2023	Vortex 1.0	GPX	(France) Stephane Gouverner	102											Ret	0	NC
2023	Vortex 1.0	GPX	(France) Philippe Gruau	103					2	18	6	5				76.8	5th
2024	Vortex 2.0	GPX			ALG		NAV		ARA		JER		VAL		BAR		
2024	Vortex 2.0	GPX	(Spain) Joanna Gruau (France) Philippe Gruau	101			15	Ret								10*	10th*
2024	Vortex 2.0	GPX	(France) Arnaud Gomez (France) Olivier Gomez	120	**4**	Ret										20*	4th*
2024	Vortex 2.0	GPX	(France) Solenn Amrouche	121 2; 101 2	DNS	DNS	Ret	7	8	Ret			Ret	DNS		36*	6th*
2024	Vortex 2.0	GPX	(France) Lionel Amrouche	121 1; 101 2	DNS	DNS			8	Ret			Ret	DNS		16*	9th*
2024	Vortex 2.0	GPX	(France) Philippe Bonnel	121			Ret	7								20*	8th*
2024	Vortex 1.0	GPX	(France) Patrick Bay	701	11	11										44.8* (Note: Additional points scored with another team.)	5th*
2024	Vortex 1.0	GPX	(Spain) Alex Gruau (Spain) Marc Gruau	701			7	8								36*	6th*
