= 2021 24 Hours of Sebring =

The layout of the Sebring International Raceway.

The 2021 Hankook 24 Hours of Sebring was the first running of the 24 Hours of Sebring, an endurance race taking place at the Sebring International Raceway on 20 and 21 November 2021. It was the final round of the 2021 24H GT and TCE Series. The race was won by Michael Doppelmayr, Swen Herberger, Elia Erhart and Markus Winkelhock in the #18 Rutronik Racing by TECE Audi R8 LMS Evo.

== Schedule ==
The initial schedule was shortened due to shipping delays and the start of the race moved from Friday to Saturday; the race is due to start at 5pm local time.

| Date | Time (local: EST) | Event | Distance |
|---|---|---|---|
| Saturday, 20 November | 09:00 - 11:30 | Free Practice | 150 Mins |
| Saturday, 20 November | 11:30 - 12:00 | Qualifying | 30 Mins |
| Saturday, 20 November | 17:00 | Race | 24 Hours |
| Sunday, 21 November | 17:00 | Race | 24 Hours |

== Entry list ==
24 cars were entered into the event; 18 GT cars and 6 TCEs.

| Team | Car | Engine | No. | Drivers |
GT3 (5 entries)
| (Germany) Leipert Motorsport | Lamborghini Huracán GT3 Evo | Lamborghini 5.2 L V10 | 10 | (Germany) Sebastian Balthasar (United States) Tyler Cooke (Germany) Dennis Fetzer (New Zealand) Brendon Leitch (United Kingdom) Seb Morris |
| (Germany) Rutronik Racing by TECE | Audi R8 LMS Evo | Audi 5.2 L V10 | 18 | (Austria) Michael Doppelmayr (Germany) Swen Herberger (Germany) Pierre Kaffer (Germany) Markus Winkelhock |
| (United States) CP Racing | Mercedes-AMG GT3 Evo | Mercedes-AMG M159 6.2 L V8 | 85 | (United States) Charles Espenlaub (United States) Joe Foster (United States) Shane Lewis (United States) Charles Putman |
| (Germany) Herberth Motorsport | Porsche 911 GT3 R (2019) | Porsche 4.0 L Flat-6 | 91 | (Switzerland) Daniel Allemann (Germany) Ralf Bohn (Germany) Alfred Renauer (Germany) Robert Renauer |
| (Germany) Herberth Motorsport | Porsche 911 GT3 R (2019) | Porsche 4.0 L Flat-6 | 92 | (Germany) "Bobby Gonzales" (Germany) Jürgen Häring (Germany) Felix Neuhofer (Germany) Wolfgang Triller (Germany) Marco Seefried |
GTX (4 entries)
| (France) Vortex V8 | Vortex 1.0 | Chevrolet 6.2 L V8 | 701 | (France) "Steve Brooks" (France) Philippe Bonnel (France) Boris Gimond (France) Sebastian Lajoux |
| (Germany) Leipert Motorsport | Lamborghini Huracán Super Trofeo Evo | Lamborghini 5.2 L V10 | 710 | (United States) Gregg Gorski (United States) Lance Bergstein (Germany) Matthias Hoffsümmer (United States) Kenton Koch (United States) Al Miller (United States) Gerhard Watzinger |
| (Germany) MRS GT-Racing | Porsche 992 GT3 Cup | Porsche 4.0 L Flat-6 | 987 | (United States) Omar Balkissoon (United States) Jeff Courtney (United States) Alexander Marmureanu (Colombia) Sebastian Moreno |
| (Germany) MRS GT-Racing | Porsche 992 GT3 Cup | Porsche 4.0 L Flat-6 | 989 | (Mexico) Jeronimo Guzman (Brazil) Raulino Kreis Jr (United States) Robert Lorndale (United States) Pedro Torres |
991 (2 entries)
| (Germany) RPM Racing | Porsche 991 GT3 Cup II | Porsche 4.0 L Flat-6 | 907 | (Sweden) Niclas Jonsson (Netherlands) Patrick Huisman (United States) Tracy Krohn (United States) Andy Lally |
| (Italy) Willi Motorsport by Ebimotors | Porsche 991 GT3 Cup II | Porsche 4.0 L Flat-6 | 955 | (Italy) Fabrizio Broggi (Italy) Sabino de Castro (Romania) Sergiu Nicolae |
GT4 (6 entries)
| (United States) Team ACP - Tanger Associates | BMW M4 GT4 | BMW N55 3.0 L Twin-Turbo I6 | 421 | (United States) Ken Goldberg (United States) Catesby Jones (United States) Jim Norman (United States) Josh Norman |
| (United States) Heart of Racing Team | Aston Martin Vantage AMR GT4 | Aston Martin 4.0 L Turbo V8 | 423 | (Canada) Roman De Angelis (United Kingdom) Ian James (United States) Gray Newell (Spain) Alex Riberas |
| (Canada) ST Racing | BMW M4 GT4 | BMW N55 3.0 L Twin-Turbo I6 | 438 | (United States) Chandler Hull (United States) Jon Miller (United States) Bryson Morris (Canada) Samantha Tan (Canada) Nick Wittmer |
| (United States) NOLASPORT | Porsche 718 Cayman GT4 Clubsport | Porsche 3.8 L Flat-6 | 470 | (United States) Zac Anderson (United States) Jason Hart (United States) Alex Mayer (United States) Scott Noble (United States) Matt Travis |
| (United States) RENNtech Motorsports | Mercedes-AMG GT4 | Mercedes-AMG M178 4.0 L V8 | 489 | (United States) Chapman Ducote (United States) David Ducote (United States) Wayne Ducote (Canada) Kyle Marcelli (United States) Alan Metni |
| (Germany) Lionspeed by Car Collection Motorsport | Audi R8 LMS GT4 Evo | Audi 5.2 L V10 | 499 | (United States) José Garcia (Germany) Patrick Kolb (Switzerland) Patric Niederhauser (Germany) Jörg Viebahn |
P4 (1 entry)
| (Germany) BMW M Motorsport | BMW M4 GT3 | BMW S58B30T0 3.0 L Twin Turbo I6 | 82 | (United States) Bill Auberlen (United States) James Clay (United States) Robby Foley (Germany) Max Hesse (United States) Neil Verhagen |
TCR (4 entries)
| (Switzerland) Autorama Motorsport by Wolf-Power Racing | Volkswagen Golf GTI TCR | Volkswagen 2.0 L I4 | 1 | (Switzerland) Mikas Born (Switzerland) Fabian Danz (Norway) Emil Heyerdahl (Austria) Constantin Kletzer (Switzerland) Jasmin Preisig |
| (Switzerland) Autorama Motorsport by Wolf-Power Racing | Volkswagen Golf GTI TCR | Volkswagen 2.0 L I4 | 112 | (Switzerland) Mikas Born (Finland) Antti Buri (Switzerland) Fabian Danz (Italy) Roberto Ferri (Finland) Kari-Pekka Laaksonen |
| (Netherlands) Red Camel-Jordans.nl | Audi RS 3 LMS TCR | Volkswagen 2.0 L I4 | 101 | (Netherlands) Ivo Breukers (Netherlands) Luc Breukers (United States) Dominique Bastien (Denmark) Kim Holmgaard |
| (Belgium) AC Motorsport | Audi RS 3 LMS TCR | Volkswagen 2.0 L I4 | 188 | (Netherlands) Rik Breukers (Belgium) Mathieu Detry (France) Stéphane Perrin (Canada) Matthew Taskinen |
TCX (2 entries)
| (France) Nordschleife Racing | Ligier JS2 R | Ford 3.7 L V6 | 226 | (France) Lucca Ayarii (France) Cédric Houot (France) Guillaume Roman (Canada) Michel Sallenbach |
| (United Kingdom) CWS Engineering | Ginetta G55 Supercup | Ford Cyclone 3.7 L V6 | 278 | (United States) Jean-Francois Brunot (United States) Joe Burris (United States) Warren Dexter (United States) Matt Rivard (United Kingdom) Colin White |

== Results ==
=== Qualifying ===
Fastest in class in bold.

| Pos. | Class | No. | Team | Time |
|---|---|---|---|---|
| 1 | **GT3** | **18** | **(Germany) Rutronik Racing by TECE** | **2:01.627** |
| 2 | GT3 | 85 | (United States) CP Racing | 2:02.766 |
| 3 | GT3 | 91 | (Germany) Herberth Motorsport | 2:03.195 |
| 4 | GT3 | 10 | (Germany) Leipert Motorsport | 2:03.234 |
| 5 | GT3 | 92 | (Germany) Herberth Motorsport | 2:03.235 |
| 6 | **GTX** | **710** | **(Germany) Leipert Motorsport** | **2:04.303** |
| 7 | **P4** | **82** | **(Germany) BMW M Motorsport** | **2:04.631** |
| 8 | GTX | 987 | (Germany) MRS GT-Racing | 2:06.773 |
| 9 | **991** | **995** | **(Romania) Willi Motorsport by Ebimotors** | **2:08.084** |
| 10 | GTX | 989 | (Germany) MRS GT-Racing | 2:08.368 |
| 11 | **GT4** | **438** | **(Canada) ST Racing** | **2:11.658** |
| 12 | GT4 | 499 | (Germany) Lionspeed by Car Collection Motorsport | 2:12.053 |
| 13 | 991 | 907 | (Germany) RPM Racing | 2:12.347 |
| 14 | GTX | 701 | (France) Vortex V8 | 2:12.853 |
| 15 | GT4 | 489 | (United States) RENNtech Motorsports | 2:14.332 |
| 16 | GT4 | 423 | (United States) Heart of Racing Team | 2:14.684 |
| 17 | **TCR** | **112** | **(Switzerland) Autorama Motorsport by Wolf-Power Racing** | **2:15.069** |
| 18 | TCR | 1 | (Switzerland) Autorama Motorsport by Wolf-Power Racing | 2:15.360 |
| 19 | TCR | 188 | (Belgium) AC Motorsport | 2:15.588 |
| 20 | **TCX** | **278** | **(United Kingdom) CWS Engineering** | **2:15.881** |
| 21 | TCX | 226 | (France) Nordschleife Racing | 2:16.461 |
| 22 | TCR | 101 | (Netherlands) Red Camel-Jordans.nl | 2:18.462 |
| 23 | GT4 | 470 | (United States) NOLASPORT | No time |
| 24 | GT4 | 421 | (United States) Team ACP - Tanger Associates | No time |

=== Race ===
Class winner in bold.

| Pos | Class | No. | Team | Drivers | Chassis | Time/Reason | Laps |
| Pos | Class | No. | Team | Drivers | Engine | Time/Reason | Laps |
|---|---|---|---|---|---|---|---|
| 1 | **GT3** | **18** | **(Germany) Rutronik Racing by TECE** | **(Austria) Michael Doppelmayr (Germany) Swen Herberger (Germany) Pierre Kaffer (Germany) Markus Winkelhock** | **Audi R8 LMS Evo** | **24:01:04.544** | **559** |
| 1 | **GT3** | **18** | **(Germany) Rutronik Racing by TECE** | **(Austria) Michael Doppelmayr (Germany) Swen Herberger (Germany) Pierre Kaffer (Germany) Markus Winkelhock** | Audi 5.2 L V10 | **24:01:04.544** | **559** |
| 2 | GT3 | 91 | (Germany) Herberth Motorsport | (Switzerland) Daniel Allemann (Germany) Ralf Bohn (Germany) Alfred Renauer (Germany) Robert Renauer | Porsche 911 GT3 R (2019) | +1:44.136 | 559 |
| 2 | GT3 | 91 | (Germany) Herberth Motorsport | (Switzerland) Daniel Allemann (Germany) Ralf Bohn (Germany) Alfred Renauer (Germany) Robert Renauer | Porsche 4.0 L Flat-6 | +1:44.136 | 559 |
| 3 | **991** | **955** | **(Romania) Willi Motorsport by Ebimotors** | **(Italy) Fabrizio Broggi (Italy) Sabino de Castro (Romania) Sergiu Nicolae** | **Porsche 991 GT3 II Cup** | **+24 Laps** | **535** |
| 3 | **991** | **955** | **(Romania) Willi Motorsport by Ebimotors** | **(Italy) Fabrizio Broggi (Italy) Sabino de Castro (Romania) Sergiu Nicolae** | **Porsche 4.0 L Flat-6** | **+24 Laps** | **535** |
| 4 | 991 | 907 | (Germany) RPM Racing | (Sweden) Niclas Jonsson (Netherlands) Patrick Huisman (United States) Tracy Krohn (United States) Andy Lally | Porsche 991 GT3 II Cup | +33 Laps | 526 |
| 4 | 991 | 907 | (Germany) RPM Racing | (Sweden) Niclas Jonsson (Netherlands) Patrick Huisman (United States) Tracy Krohn (United States) Andy Lally | Porsche 4.0 L Flat-6 | +33 Laps | 526 |
| 5 | **GTX** | **710** | **(Germany) Leipert Motorsport** | **(United States) Gregg Gorski (United States) Lance Bergstein (Germany) Matthias Hoffsümmer (United States) Kenton Koch (United States) Al Miller (United States) Gerhard Watzinger** | **Lamborghini Huracán Super Trofeo Evo** | **+38 Laps** | **521** |
| 5 | **GTX** | **710** | **(Germany) Leipert Motorsport** | **(United States) Gregg Gorski (United States) Lance Bergstein (Germany) Matthias Hoffsümmer (United States) Kenton Koch (United States) Al Miller (United States) Gerhard Watzinger** | **Lamborghini 5.2 L V10** | **+38 Laps** | **521** |
| 6 | **GT4** | **470** | **(United States) NOLASPORT** | **(United States) Zac Anderson (United States) Jason Hart (United States) Alex Mayer (United States) Scott Noble (United States) Matt Travis** | **Porsche 718 Cayman GT4 Clubsport** | **+41 Laps** | **518** |
| 6 | **GT4** | **470** | **(United States) NOLASPORT** | **(United States) Zac Anderson (United States) Jason Hart (United States) Alex Mayer (United States) Scott Noble (United States) Matt Travis** | **Porsche 3.8 L Flat-6** | **+41 Laps** | **518** |
| 7 | GT4 | 438 | (Canada) ST Racing | (United States) Chandler Hull (United States) Jon Miller (United States) Bryson Morris (Canada) Samantha Tan (Canada) Nick Wittmer | BMW M4 GT4 | +42 Laps | 517 |
| 7 | GT4 | 438 | (Canada) ST Racing | (United States) Chandler Hull (United States) Jon Miller (United States) Bryson Morris (Canada) Samantha Tan (Canada) Nick Wittmer | BMW N55 3.0 L Twin-Turbo I6 | +42 Laps | 517 |
| 8 | **TCR** | **188** | **(Belgium) AC Motorsport** | **(Netherlands) Rik Breukers (Belgium) Mathieu Detry (France) Stéphane Perrin (Canada) Matthew Taskinen** | **Audi RS 3 LMS TCR** | **+45 Laps** | **514** |
| 8 | **TCR** | **188** | **(Belgium) AC Motorsport** | **(Netherlands) Rik Breukers (Belgium) Mathieu Detry (France) Stéphane Perrin (Canada) Matthew Taskinen** | **Volkswagen 2.0 L I4** | **+45 Laps** | **514** |
| 9 | TCR | 1 | (Switzerland) Autorama Motorsport by Wolf-Power Racing | (Switzerland) Mikas Born (Switzerland) Fabian Danz (Norway) Emil Heyerdahl (Austria) Constantin Kletzer (Switzerland) Jasmin Preisig | Volkswagen Golf GTI TCR | +46 Laps | 513 |
| 9 | TCR | 1 | (Switzerland) Autorama Motorsport by Wolf-Power Racing | (Switzerland) Mikas Born (Switzerland) Fabian Danz (Norway) Emil Heyerdahl (Austria) Constantin Kletzer (Switzerland) Jasmin Preisig | Volkswagen 2.0 L I4 | +46 Laps | 513 |
| 10 | GT3 | 92 | (Germany) Herberth Motorsport | (Germany) "Bobby Gonzales" (Germany) Jürgen Häring (Germany) Felix Neuhofer (Germany) Wolfgang Triller (Germany) Marco Seefried | Porsche 911 GT3 R (2019) | +50 Laps | 509 |
| 10 | GT3 | 92 | (Germany) Herberth Motorsport | (Germany) "Bobby Gonzales" (Germany) Jürgen Häring (Germany) Felix Neuhofer (Germany) Wolfgang Triller (Germany) Marco Seefried | Porsche 4.0 L Flat-6 | +50 Laps | 509 |
| 11 | TCR | 112 | (Switzerland) Autorama Motorsport by Wolf-Power Racing | (Switzerland) Mikas Born (Finland) Antti Buri (Switzerland) Fabian Danz (Italy) Roberto Ferri (Finland) Kari-Pekka Laaksonen | Volkswagen Golf GTI TCR | +57 Laps | 502 |
| 11 | TCR | 112 | (Switzerland) Autorama Motorsport by Wolf-Power Racing | (Switzerland) Mikas Born (Finland) Antti Buri (Switzerland) Fabian Danz (Italy) Roberto Ferri (Finland) Kari-Pekka Laaksonen | Volkswagen 2.0 L I4 | +57 Laps | 502 |
| 12 | **TCX** | **226** | **(France) Nordschleife Racing** | **(France) Lucca Ayarii (France) Cédric Houot (France) Guillaume Roman (Canada) Michel Sallenbach** | **Ligier JS2 R** | **+68 Laps** | **491** |
| 12 | **TCX** | **226** | **(France) Nordschleife Racing** | **(France) Lucca Ayarii (France) Cédric Houot (France) Guillaume Roman (Canada) Michel Sallenbach** | **Ford 3.7 L V6** | **+68 Laps** | **491** |
| 13 | GTX | 987 | (Germany) MRS GT-Racing | (United States) Omar Balkissoon (United States) Jeff Courtney (United States) Alexander Marmureanu (Colombia) Sebastian Moreno | Porsche 992 GT3 Cup | +82 Laps | 477 |
| 13 | GTX | 987 | (Germany) MRS GT-Racing | (United States) Omar Balkissoon (United States) Jeff Courtney (United States) Alexander Marmureanu (Colombia) Sebastian Moreno | Porsche 4.0 L Flat-6 | +82 Laps | 477 |
| 14 | GT4 | 421 | (United States) Team ACP - Tanger Associates | (United States) Ken Goldberg (United States) Catesby Jones (United States) Jim Norman (United States) Josh Norman | BMW M4 GT4 | +91 Laps | 468 |
| 14 | GT4 | 421 | (United States) Team ACP - Tanger Associates | (United States) Ken Goldberg (United States) Catesby Jones (United States) Jim Norman (United States) Josh Norman | BMW N55 3.0 L Twin-Turbo I6 | +91 Laps | 468 |
| 15 | GTX | 701 | (France) Vortex V8 | (France) "Steve Brooks" (France) Philippe Bonnel (France) Boris Gimond (France) Sebastian Lajoux | Vortex 1.0 | +101 Laps | 458 |
| 15 | GTX | 701 | (France) Vortex V8 | (France) "Steve Brooks" (France) Philippe Bonnel (France) Boris Gimond (France) Sebastian Lajoux | Chevrolet 6.2 L V8 | +101 Laps | 458 |
| 16 | **P4** | **82** | **(Germany) BMW M Motorsport** | **(United States) Bill Auberlen (United States) James Clay (United States) Robby Foley (Germany) Max Hesse (United States) Neil Verhagen** | **BMW M4 GT3** | **+102 Laps** | **457** |
| 16 | **P4** | **82** | **(Germany) BMW M Motorsport** | **(United States) Bill Auberlen (United States) James Clay (United States) Robby Foley (Germany) Max Hesse (United States) Neil Verhagen** | **BMW S58B30T0 3.0 L Twin Turbo I6** | **+102 Laps** | **457** |
| 17 DNF | GT4 | 421 | (United States) Heart of Racing Team | (Canada) Roman De Angelis (United Kingdom) Ian James (United States) Gray Newell (Spain) Alex Riberas | Aston Martin Vantage AMR GT4 | +110 Laps | 447 |
| 17 DNF | GT4 | 421 | (United States) Heart of Racing Team | (Canada) Roman De Angelis (United Kingdom) Ian James (United States) Gray Newell (Spain) Alex Riberas | Aston Martin 4.0 V8 Biturbo | +110 Laps | 447 |
| 18 DNF | GT3 | 10 | (Germany) Leipert Motorsport | (Germany) Sebastian Balthasar (United States) Tyler Cooke (Germany) Dennis Fetzer (New Zealand) Brendon Leitch (United Kingdom) Seb Morris | Lamborghini Huracán GT3 Evo | +204 Laps | 355 |
| 18 DNF | GT3 | 10 | (Germany) Leipert Motorsport | (Germany) Sebastian Balthasar (United States) Tyler Cooke (Germany) Dennis Fetzer (New Zealand) Brendon Leitch (United Kingdom) Seb Morris | Lamborghini 5.2 L V10 | +204 Laps | 355 |
| DNF | GT3 | 85 | (United States) CP Racing | (United States) Charles Espenlaub (United States) Joe Foster (United States) Shane Lewis (United States) Charles Putman | Mercedes-AMG GT3 Evo | Crash | 309 |
| DNF | GT3 | 85 | (United States) CP Racing | (United States) Charles Espenlaub (United States) Joe Foster (United States) Shane Lewis (United States) Charles Putman | Mercedes-AMG M159 6.2 L V8 | Crash | 309 |
| DNF | GT4 | 489 | (United States) RENNtech Motorsports | (United States) Chapman Ducote (United States) David Ducote (United States) Wayne Ducote (Canada) Kyle Marcelli (United States) Alan Metni | Mercedes-AMG GT4 | Retired | 289 |
| DNF | GT4 | 489 | (United States) RENNtech Motorsports | (United States) Chapman Ducote (United States) David Ducote (United States) Wayne Ducote (Canada) Kyle Marcelli (United States) Alan Metni | Mercedes-AMG M178 4.0 L V8 | Retired | 289 |
| DNF | GT4 | 499 | (Germany) Lionspeed by Car Collection Motorsport | (United States) José Garcia (Germany) Patrick Kolb (Switzerland) Patric Niederhauser (Germany) Jörg Viebahn | Audi R8 LMS GT4 Evo | Crash | 269 |
| DNF | GT4 | 499 | (Germany) Lionspeed by Car Collection Motorsport | (United States) José Garcia (Germany) Patrick Kolb (Switzerland) Patric Niederhauser (Germany) Jörg Viebahn | Audi 5.2 L V10 | Crash | 269 |
| DNF | GTX | 989 | (Germany) MRS GT-Racing | (Mexico) Jeronimo Guzman (Brazil) Raulino Kreis Jr (United States) Robert Lorndale (United States) Pedro Torres | Porsche 992 GT3 Cup | Retired | 256 |
| DNF | GTX | 989 | (Germany) MRS GT-Racing | (Mexico) Jeronimo Guzman (Brazil) Raulino Kreis Jr (United States) Robert Lorndale (United States) Pedro Torres | Porsche 4.0 L Flat-6 | Retired | 256 |
| NC | TCX | 278 | (United Kingdom) CWS Engineering | (United States) Jean-Francois Brunot (United States) Joe Burris (United States) Warren Dexter (United States) Matt Rivard (United Kingdom) Colin White | Ginetta G55 Supercup | Not Classified | 253 |
| NC | TCX | 278 | (United Kingdom) CWS Engineering | (United States) Jean-Francois Brunot (United States) Joe Burris (United States) Warren Dexter (United States) Matt Rivard (United Kingdom) Colin White | Ford Cyclone 3.7 L V6 | Not Classified | 253 |
| DNS | TCR | 101 | (Netherlands) Red Camel-Jordans.nl | (Netherlands) Ivo Breukers (Netherlands) Luc Breukers (United States) Dominique Bastien (Denmark) Kim Holmgaard | Audi RS 3 LMS TCR | Did Not Start | 0 |
| DNS | TCR | 101 | (Netherlands) Red Camel-Jordans.nl | (Netherlands) Ivo Breukers (Netherlands) Luc Breukers (United States) Dominique Bastien (Denmark) Kim Holmgaard | Volkswagen 2.0 L I4 | Did Not Start | 0 |

24H GT Series
| Previous race: 12 Hours of Hungary | 2021 season | Next race: none |

24H TCE Series
| Previous race: 12 Hours of Hungary | 2021 season | Next race: none |
