= 2025 24 Hours of Barcelona =

Layout of Circuit de Barcelona-Catalunya, where the race was held

The 2025 24 Hours of Barcelona (known as the 2025 Michelin 24 Hours of Barcelona for sponsorship reasons) was an endurance sportscar race held between 26 and 28 September 2025, in Montmeló, Spain, as the fifth and final round of the 2025 24H Series. It was the 26th running of the event.

== Background ==
The event was announced on 24 September 2024, along with the rest of the 2025 24H Series calendar.

== Entry list ==
The entry list was announced on 22 September 2025, and features 33 entries over 5 classes – 14 in GT3, 2 in GTX, 9 in 992, 3 in GT4 and 5 in TCE.

No.	Entrant	Car	Class	Driver 1	Driver 2	Driver 3	Driver 4	Driver 5
GT3 (14 entries)
11	(Switzerland) Hofor Racing	Mercedes-AMG GT3 Evo	Am	(Germany) Torsten Kratz	(Switzerland) Michael Kroll	(Germany) Maximilian Partl	(Germany) Alexander Prinz	(Switzerland) Chantal Prinz
18	(France) Saintéloc Junior Team	Audi R8 LMS Evo II	PA	(Austria) Michael Doppelmayr	(Germany) Elia Erhart	(Switzerland) Ernst Inderbitzin	(Germany) Pierre Kaffer	(France) Stephane Tribaudini
21	(Antigua and Barbuda) HAAS RT	Audi R8 LMS Evo II	P	(Canada) Ramez Azzam	(Belgium) Nicolas Guelinckx	(Belgium) Peter Guelinckx	(Belgium) Matisse Lismont	
28	(France) TFT Racing	Mercedes-AMG GT3 Evo	PA	(France) Jordan Boisson	(France) Patrick Charlaix	(Germany) Maro Engel	(Belgium) Benjamin Paque	
56	(Czech Republic) Scuderia Praha	Ferrari 296 GT3	PA	(Czech Republic) Josef Král	(Slovakia) Matúš Výboh	(Czech Republic) Miroslav Výboh	(Czech Republic) Dennis Waszek	
65	(Malaysia) Viper Niza Racing	Mercedes-AMG GT3 Evo	Am	(Malaysia) Dominic Ang	(Malaysia) Mohammed Afiq Ikhwan	(Malaysia) Douglas Khoo	(Malaysia) Aaron Lim	(Malaysia) Melvin Moh
69	(United Kingdom) Continental Racing by Simpson Motorsport	Audi R8 LMS Evo II	Am	(Germany) Alex Arkin Aka	(United Kingdom) Sacha Kakad	Maksim Kizilov	(Kyrgyzstan) Andrey Solukovtsev	(Cyprus) Vasily Vladykin
71	(Lithuania) Juta Racing	Audi R8 LMS Evo II	Am	(Lithuania) Arunas Geciauskas	(Italy) Nicola Michelon	(United Kingdom) Gavin Pickering	(United Kingdom) Lars Viljoen	(China) Zhang Yaqi
73	(Germany) Proton Huber Competition	Porsche 911 GT3 R (992)	PA	(Austria) Klaus Bachler	(Germany) Jörg Dreisow	(Germany) Constantin Dressler	(Germany) Manuel Lauck	
81	(United States) Era Motorsport	Ferrari 296 GT3	PA	(United Kingdom) Oliver Bryant	(United States) Ryan Dalziel	(United Kingdom) Jake Hill	(United States) Dwight Merriman	(United States) Kyle Tilley
90	(Spain) E2P Racing	Aston Martin Vantage AMR GT3 Evo	Am	(Spain) Pablo Burguera	(Spain) Olievr Campos	(Spain) Javier Morcillo	(Spain) Antonio Sainero	
93	(Belgium) Red Ant Racing	Mercedes-AMG GT3 Evo	P	(Belgium) Kobe de Breucker	(Germany) Kenneth Heyer	(Belgium) Ayrton Redant	(Belgium) Yannick Redant	(Netherlands) Loek Hartog
98	(United Arab Emirates) Into Africa Racing by Dragon	Ferrari 296 GT3	P	(Zimbabwe) Axcil Jefferies	(South Africa) Xollie Letlaka	(South Africa) Arnold Neveling	(South Africa) Stuart White	
286	(Germany) GetSpeed Performance	Mercedes-AMG GT3 Evo	Am	(United States) Jon Hirshberg	(Australia) Andres Latorre	(United States) Patrick Liddy	(Germany) Adam Osieka	(Ukraine) Yaroslav Veselaho
GTX (2 entries)
701	(France) Vortex V8	Vortex 2.0		(France) Lionel Amrouche	(France) Philippe Bonnel	(France) Cyril Calmon	(France) Gilles Courtois	(France) Olivier Gomez
974	(France) Vortex V8	Vortex 2.0		(France) Lionel Amrouche	(France) Solenn Amrouche	(France) Olivier Gomez	(France) Yoann Olivar	(France) Arnaud Tsamere
992 (9 entries)
888	(France) SebLajoux Racing	Porsche 992 GT3 Cup	Am	(France) Sebastien Lajoux	(Netherlands) Paul Meijer	(France) Stephane Perrin	(Belgium) Mathieu Detry	(Belgium) Fabian Duffieux
901	(India) Ajith Kumar Racing by Red Ant	Porsche 992 GT3 Cup	Am	(Netherlands) Huub van Eijndhoven	(India) Ajith Kumar	(Australia) Cameron McLeod	(Netherlands) Ralph Poppelaars	(Belgium) Gregory Servais
902	(Denmark) Holmgaard Motorsport	Porsche 992 GT3 Cup	Am	(Denmark) Marco Gersager	(Denmark) Jonas Holmgaard	(Denmark) Magnus Holmgaard	(Denmark) Martin Vedel Mortensen	(Denmark) Patrick Steen Rasmussen
907	(Germany) RPM Racing	Porsche 992 GT3 Cup	Am	(Germany) Philip Hamprecht	(Netherlands) Patrick Huisman	(Sweden) Niclas Jönsson	(United States) Tracy Krohn	
909	(Netherlands) Red Camel-Jordans.nl	Porsche 992 GT3 Cup	P	(Netherlands) Ivo Breukers	(Netherlands) Luc Breukers	(Netherlands) Rik Breukers	(Switzerland) Fabian Denz	
921	(Belgium) Mühlner Motorsport	Porsche 992 GT3 Cup	P	(Germany) Julian Hanses	(Netherlands) Paul Meijer	(Estonia) Martin Rump	(Latvia) Valters Zviedris	
928	(Germany) HRT Performance	Porsche 992 GT3 Cup	Am	(United Kingdom) Steven Gambrell	(Republic of Ireland) Jonathan Kearney	(United Kingdom) James Kellett	(El Salvador) Rolando Saca	(United Arab Emirates) Igor Sorokin
938	(France) GP Racing Team	Porsche 992 GT3 Cup	Am	(France) Michael Blanchemain	(France) Jérôme Da Costa	(France) Cyril Saleilles	(France) Loïc Teire	
949	(Spain) Escuderia Faraon	Porsche 992 GT3 Cup	Am	(Spain) Francesc Gutierrez Agüi	(Spain) Pedro Miguel Lourinho Bras	(Spain) Agustin Sanabria Crespo	(Spain) Fernando Gonzalez Gonzalez	(Spain) Pablo Bras Silvero
GT4 (3 entries)
421	(United Kingdom) Venture Engineering	Mercedes-AMG GT4		(United Kingdom) Matthew George	(United Kingdom) Owen Hizzey	(United Kingdom) Christopher Jones	(United Kingdom) Neville Jones	
427	(Germany) SRS Team Sorg Rennsport	Porsche 718 Cayman GT4 RS Clubsport		(France) Thierry Chkondali	(France) Marc Girard	(France) Jordan Mougenot	(Canada) Michel Sallenbach	(Canada) Damon Surzyshyn
488	(Spain) NM Racing	Mercedes-AMG GT4		(Spain) Manel Lao Cornago	(United States) Keith Gatehouse	(United Kingdom) Branden Lee Oxley	(Spain) Jorge Belloc Ruiz	
TCE (5 entries)
102	(Germany) asBest Racing	Cupra TCR DSG		(Poland) Rafal Gieras	(Germany) Pia Ohlsson	(Germany) Sebastian Schemmann	(Japan) Junichi Umemoto	
111	(Germany) asBest Racing	Porsche 718 Cayman GT4 CS (982)		(United States) Seth Brown	(Denmark) Conrad Tox Leveau	(Germany) Desirée Müller	(Belgium) Steven Teirlinck	
123	(United States) THRW Honda Racing	Honda Civic Type R (FL5)		(United States) Derek Ferretti	(United States) Christian Hernandez	(United States) Corey Taguchi	(United States) Weston Walter	
124	(United States) THRW Honda Racing	Honda Civic Type R (FL5)		(Canada) Todd Chiappino	(Canada) Lawrence Hwang	(United States) Jeremy Lucas	(Canada) Scott Nicol	
133	(United Kingdom) J-Mec Engineering	BMW M3 E46		(United Kingdom) Steve Cheetham	(United Kingdom) Kevin Clarke	(United Kingdom) James Collins	(United Kingdom) Oliver Smith	

GT3 entries
Icon	Class
P	GT3-Pro
PA	GT3-Pro/Am
Am	GT3-Am
992 entries
Icon	Class
P	992-Pro
Am	992-Am

== Schedule ==
Date	Time (local: CET)	Event	Duration
Friday, 26 September	13:30 - 15:00	Free practice	90 minutes
Friday, 26 September	16:30 - 16:45	Qualifying Session 1 - Classes TCE, GT4, GTX & 992	15 minutes
Friday, 26 September	16:50 - 17:05	Qualifying Session 2 - Classes TCE, GT4, GTX & 992	15 minutes
Friday, 26 September	17:10 - 17:25	Qualifying Session 3 - Classes TCE, GT4, GTX & 992	15 minutes
Friday, 26 September	17:35 - 17:50	Qualifying Session 1 - Class GT3	15 minutes
Friday, 26 September	17:55 - 18:10	Qualifying Session 2 - Class GT3	15 minutes
Friday, 26 September	18:15 - 18:30	Qualifying Session 3 - Class GT3	15 minutes
Friday, 26 September	20:00 - 21:30	Night Practice	90 minutes
Saturday–Sunday, 27–28 September	12:00 - 12:00	Race	24 hours

== Free Practice ==
Class	No.	Entrant	Driver	Time
GT3	81	(United States) Era Motorsport	(United States) Ryan Dalziel	1:40.948
GTX	974	(France) Vortex V8	(France) Olivier Gomez	1:47.218
992	928	(Germany) HRT Performance	(United Kingdom) James Kellett	1:44.901
GT4	421	(United Kingdom) Venture Engineering	(United Kingdom) Matthew George	1:49.866
TCE	111	(Germany) asBest Racing	(United States) Seth Brown	1:53.755

- Note: Only the fastest car in each class is shown.

== Qualifying ==
Qualifying was split into three parts for both groups. The average of the best times per qualifying session determined the starting order. TFT Racing secured pole position with a combined average time of 1:41.101.

=== Qualifying results ===
Pole position winners in each class are marked in bold.

==== TCE, GT4, GTX & 992 ====
Pos.	Class	No.	Team	Avg
1	**992 Am**	**901**	**(India) Ajith Kumar Racing by Red Ant**	**1:45.441**
2	**992 Pro**	**909**	**(Netherlands) Red Camel-Jordans.nl**	**1:45.607**
3	992 Am	888	(France) SebLajoux Racing	1:45.676
4	992 Pro	921	(Belgium) Mühlner Motorsport	1:45.765
5	992 Am	928	(Germany) HRT Performance	1:45.813
6	**GTX**	**974**	**(France) Vortex V8**	**1:46.272**
7	992 Am	902	(Denmark) Holmgaard Motorsport	1:47.191
8	992 Am	907	(Germany) RPM Racing	1:47.245
9	992 Am	938	(France) GP Racing Team	1:47.470
10	992 Am	949	(Spain) Escuderia Faraon	1:48.897
11	GTX	701	(France) Vortex V8	1:49.322
12	**GT4**	**488**	**(Spain) NM Racing**	**1:51.092**
13	GT4	427	(Germany) SRS Team Sorg Rennsport	1:53.028
14	GT4	421	(United Kingdom) Venture Engineering	1:53.444
15	**TCE**	**133**	**(United Kingdom) J-Mec Engineering**	**1:54.953**
16	TCE	102	(Germany) asBest Racing	1:58.091
17	TCE	124	(United States) THRW Honda Racing	2:00.135
18	TCE	123	(United States) THRW Honda Racing	2:02.329
19	TCE	111	(Germany) asBest Racing	1:55.221

==== GT3 ====
Pos.	Class	No.	Team	Avg
1	**GT3 Pro/Am**	**28**	**(France) TFT Racing**	**1:41.101**
2	GT3 Pro/Am	18	(France) Saintéloc Junior Team	1:41.581
3	GT3 Pro/Am	73	(Germany) Proton Huber Competition	1:41.710
4	**GT3 Pro**	**93**	**(Belgium) Red Ant Racing**	**1:41.739**
5	GT3 Pro/Am	56	(Czech Republic) Scuderia Praha	1:41.877
6	**GT3 Am**	**11**	**(Switzerland) Hofor Racing**	**1:41.970**
7	GT3 Am	286	(Germany) GetSpeed Performance	1:42.251
8	GT3 Am	90	(Spain) E2P Racing	1:42.267
9	GT3 Pro	98	(United Arab Emirates) Into Africa Racing by Dragon	1:42.408
10	GT3 Pro	21	(Antigua and Barbuda) HAAS RT	1:42.526
11	GT3 Am	65	(Malaysia) Viper Niza Racing	1:42.795
12	GT3 Pro/Am	81	(United States) Era Motorsport	1:42.821
13	GT3 Am	69	(United Kingdom) Continental Racing by Simpson Motorsport	1:43.032
14	GT3 Am	71	(Lithuania) Juta Racing	1:43.144

== Night practice ==
Class	No.	Entrant	Driver	Time
GT3	28	(France) TFT Racing	(Germany) Maro Engel	1:42.284
GTX	701	(France) Vortex V8	(France) Olivier Gomez	1:52.212
992	888	(France) SebLajoux Racing	(Netherlands) Paul Meijer	1:46.188
GT4	421	(United Kingdom) Venture Engineering	(United Kingdom) Matthew George	1:50.324
TCE	111	(Germany) asBest Racing	(Denmark) Conrad Tox Leveau	1:53.518

- Note: Only the fastest car in each class is shown.

== Race ==
The race was won overall by the No. 11 Hofor Racing Mercedes-AMG followed by the No. 21 HAAS RT Audi in second and the No. 71 Juta Racing Audi in third.

=== Race results ===
Class winners are in bold.

Pos	Class	No.	Team	Drivers	Car	Laps	Time/Retired
Pos	Class	No.	Team	Drivers	Engine	Laps	Time/Retired
1	**GT3 Am**	**11**	**(Switzerland) Hofor Racing**	**(Switzerland) Michael Kroll** **(Germany) Torsten Kratz** **(Germany) Alexander Prinz** **(Switzerland) Chantal Prinz** **(Germany) Maximilian Partl**	**Mercedes-AMG GT3 Evo**	**733**	**24:00:48.830**
1	**GT3 Am**	**11**	**(Switzerland) Hofor Racing**	**(Switzerland) Michael Kroll** **(Germany) Torsten Kratz** **(Germany) Alexander Prinz** **(Switzerland) Chantal Prinz** **(Germany) Maximilian Partl**	**Mercedes-AMG M159 6.2 L V8**	**733**	**24:00:48.830**
2	**GT3 Pro**	**21**	**(Antigua and Barbuda) HAAS RT**	**(Canada) Ramez Azzam** **(Belgium) Nicolas Guelinckx** **(Belgium) Peter Guelinckx** **(Belgium) Matisse Lismont**	**Audi R8 LMS Evo II**	**731**	**+2 Laps**
2	**GT3 Pro**	**21**	**(Antigua and Barbuda) HAAS RT**	**(Canada) Ramez Azzam** **(Belgium) Nicolas Guelinckx** **(Belgium) Peter Guelinckx** **(Belgium) Matisse Lismont**	**Audi DAR 5.2 L V10**	**731**	**+2 Laps**
3	GT3 Am	71	(Lithuania) Juta Racing	(Lithuania) Arunas Geciauskas (Italy) Nicola Michelon (United Kingdom) Gavin Pickering (United Kingdom) Lars Viljoen (China) Zhang Yaqi	Audi R8 LMS Evo II	731	+2 Laps
3	GT3 Am	71	(Lithuania) Juta Racing	(Lithuania) Arunas Geciauskas (Italy) Nicola Michelon (United Kingdom) Gavin Pickering (United Kingdom) Lars Viljoen (China) Zhang Yaqi	Audi DAR 5.2 L V10	731	+2 Laps
4	**GT3 Pro/Am**	**73**	**(Germany) Proton Huber Competition**	**(Austria) Klaus Bachler** **(Germany) Jörg Dreisow** **(Germany) Manuel Lauck** **(Germany) Constantin Dressler**	**Porsche 911 GT3 R (992)**	**730**	**+3 Laps**
4	**GT3 Pro/Am**	**73**	**(Germany) Proton Huber Competition**	**(Austria) Klaus Bachler** **(Germany) Jörg Dreisow** **(Germany) Manuel Lauck** **(Germany) Constantin Dressler**	**Porsche M97/80 4.2 L Flat-6**	**730**	**+3 Laps**
5	GT3 Pro/Am	18	(France) Saintéloc Junior Team	(France) Stephane Tribaudini (Austria) Michael Doppelmayr (Germany) Elia Erhart (Switzerland) Ernst Inderbitzin (Germany) Pierre Kaffer	Audi R8 LMS Evo II	730	+3 Laps
5	GT3 Pro/Am	18	(France) Saintéloc Junior Team	(France) Stephane Tribaudini (Austria) Michael Doppelmayr (Germany) Elia Erhart (Switzerland) Ernst Inderbitzin (Germany) Pierre Kaffer	Audi DAR 5.2 L V10	730	+3 Laps
6	GT3 Pro/Am	28	(France) TFT Racing	(Germany) Maro Engel (France) Jordan Boisson (France) Patrick Charlaix (Belgium) Benjamin Paque	Mercedes-AMG GT3 Evo	730	+3 Laps
6	GT3 Pro/Am	28	(France) TFT Racing	(Germany) Maro Engel (France) Jordan Boisson (France) Patrick Charlaix (Belgium) Benjamin Paque	Mercedes-AMG M159 6.2 L V8	730	+3 Laps
7	GT3 Am	69	(United Kingdom) Continental Racing by Simpson Motorsport	(Germany) Alex Arkin Aka (United Kingdom) Sacha Kakad; Maksim Kizilov (Kyrgyzstan) Andrey Solukovtsev (Cyprus) Vasily Vladykin	Audi R8 LMS Evo II	729	+4 Laps
7	GT3 Am	69	(United Kingdom) Continental Racing by Simpson Motorsport	(Germany) Alex Arkin Aka (United Kingdom) Sacha Kakad; Maksim Kizilov (Kyrgyzstan) Andrey Solukovtsev (Cyprus) Vasily Vladykin	Audi DAR 5.2 L V10	729	+4 Laps
8	GT3 Pro/Am	81	(United States) Era Motorsport	(United States) Ryan Dalziel (United Kingdom) Jake Hill (United States) Dwight Merriman (United Kingdom) Oliver Bryant (United States) Kyle Tilley	Ferrari 296 GT3	728	+5 Laps
8	GT3 Pro/Am	81	(United States) Era Motorsport	(United States) Ryan Dalziel (United Kingdom) Jake Hill (United States) Dwight Merriman (United Kingdom) Oliver Bryant (United States) Kyle Tilley	Ferrari F163CE 3.0 L Turbo V6	728	+5 Laps
9	**992 Pro**	**921**	**(Belgium) Mühlner Motorsport**	**(Estonia) Martin Rump** **(Latvia) Valters Zviedris** **(Germany) Julian Hanses** **(Netherlands) Paul Meijer**	**Porsche 992 GT3 Cup**	**717**	**+16 Laps**
9	**992 Pro**	**921**	**(Belgium) Mühlner Motorsport**	**(Estonia) Martin Rump** **(Latvia) Valters Zviedris** **(Germany) Julian Hanses** **(Netherlands) Paul Meijer**	**Porsche 4.0 L Flat-6**	**717**	**+16 Laps**
10	**992 Am**	**928**	**(Germany) HRT Performance**	**(United Kingdom) Steven Gambrell** **(Republic of Ireland) Jonathan Kearney** **(United Kingdom) James Kellett** **(El Salvador) Rolando Saca** **(United Arab Emirates) Igor Sorokin**	**Porsche 992 GT3 Cup**	**712**	**+21 Laps**
10	**992 Am**	**928**	**(Germany) HRT Performance**	**(United Kingdom) Steven Gambrell** **(Republic of Ireland) Jonathan Kearney** **(United Kingdom) James Kellett** **(El Salvador) Rolando Saca** **(United Arab Emirates) Igor Sorokin**	**Porsche 4.0 L Flat-6**	**712**	**+21 Laps**
11	992 Am	907	(Germany) RPM Racing	(Germany) Philip Hamprecht (Sweden) Niclas Jönsson (United States) Tracy Krohn (Netherlands) Patrick Huisman	Porsche 992 GT3 Cup	708	+25 Laps
11	992 Am	907	(Germany) RPM Racing	(Germany) Philip Hamprecht (Sweden) Niclas Jönsson (United States) Tracy Krohn (Netherlands) Patrick Huisman	Porsche 4.0 L Flat-6	708	+25 Laps
12	GT3 Am	90	(Spain) E2P Racing	(Spain) Pablo Burguera (Spain) Oliver Campos (Spain) Antonio Sainero (Spain) Javier Morcillo	Aston Martin Vantage AMR GT3 Evo	706	+27 Laps
12	GT3 Am	90	(Spain) E2P Racing	(Spain) Pablo Burguera (Spain) Oliver Campos (Spain) Antonio Sainero (Spain) Javier Morcillo	Aston Martin M177 4.0 L Twin-Turbo V8	706	+27 Laps
13	GT3 Pro/Am	56	(Czech Republic) Scuderia Praha	(Czech Republic) Josef Král (Czech Republic) Matúš Výboh (Czech Republic) Miroslav Výboh (Czech Republic) Dennis Waszek	Ferrari 296 GT3	706	+27 Laps
13	GT3 Pro/Am	56	(Czech Republic) Scuderia Praha	(Czech Republic) Josef Král (Czech Republic) Matúš Výboh (Czech Republic) Miroslav Výboh (Czech Republic) Dennis Waszek	Ferrari F163CE 3.0 L Turbo V6	706	+27 Laps
14	992 Am	888	(France) SebLajoux Racing	(France) Sebastien Lajoux (Netherlands) Paul Meijer (France) Stephane Perrin (Belgium) Mathieu Detry (Belgium) Fabian Duffieux	Porsche 992 GT3 Cup	704	+29 Laps
14	992 Am	888	(France) SebLajoux Racing	(France) Sebastien Lajoux (Netherlands) Paul Meijer (France) Stephane Perrin (Belgium) Mathieu Detry (Belgium) Fabian Duffieux	Porsche 4.0 L Flat-6	704	+29 Laps
15	992 Am	901	(India) Ajith Kumar Racing by Red Ant	(Netherlands) Huub van Eijndhoven (India) Ajith Kumar (Australia) Cameron McLeod (Netherlands) Ralph Poppelaars (Belgium) Gregory Servais	Porsche 992 GT3 Cup	699	+34 Laps
15	992 Am	901	(India) Ajith Kumar Racing by Red Ant	(Netherlands) Huub van Eijndhoven (India) Ajith Kumar (Australia) Cameron McLeod (Netherlands) Ralph Poppelaars (Belgium) Gregory Servais	Porsche 4.0 L Flat-6	699	+34 Laps
16	992 Am	902	(Denmark) Holmgaard Motorsport	(Denmark) Marco Gersager (Denmark) Jonas Holmgaard (Denmark) Magnus Holmgaard (Denmark) Patrick Rasmussen (Denmark) Martin Vedel Mortensen	Porsche 992 GT3 Cup	698	+35 Laps
16	992 Am	902	(Denmark) Holmgaard Motorsport	(Denmark) Marco Gersager (Denmark) Jonas Holmgaard (Denmark) Magnus Holmgaard (Denmark) Patrick Rasmussen (Denmark) Martin Vedel Mortensen	Porsche 4.0 L Flat-6	698	+35 Laps
17	**GT4**	**421**	**(United Kingdom) Venture Engineering**	**(United Kingdom) Matthew George** **(United Kingdom) Christopher Jones** **(United Kingdom) Neville Jones** **(United Kingdom) Owen Hizzey**	**Mercedes-AMG GT4**	**676**	**+57 Laps**
17	**GT4**	**421**	**(United Kingdom) Venture Engineering**	**(United Kingdom) Matthew George** **(United Kingdom) Christopher Jones** **(United Kingdom) Neville Jones** **(United Kingdom) Owen Hizzey**	**Mercedes-AMG M178 4.0 L V8**	**676**	**+57 Laps**
18	**GTX**	**701**	**(France) Vortex V8**	**(France) Lionel Amrouche** **(France) Philippe Bonnel** **(France) Cyril Calmon** **(France) Gilles Courtois** **(France) Olivier Gomez**	**Vortex 2.0**	**661**	**+72 Laps**
18	**GTX**	**701**	**(France) Vortex V8**	**(France) Lionel Amrouche** **(France) Philippe Bonnel** **(France) Cyril Calmon** **(France) Gilles Courtois** **(France) Olivier Gomez**	**Chevrolet LS3 6.2 L V8**	**661**	**+72 Laps**
19	GT4	427	(Germany) SRS Team Sorg Rennsport	(France) Thierry Chkondali (France) Marc Girard (France) Jordan Mougenot (Canada) Michel Sallenbach (Canada) Damon Surzyshyn	Porsche 718 Cayman GT4 RS Clubsport	648	+85 Laps
19	GT4	427	(Germany) SRS Team Sorg Rennsport	(France) Thierry Chkondali (France) Marc Girard (France) Jordan Mougenot (Canada) Michel Sallenbach (Canada) Damon Surzyshyn	Porsche MDG 4.0 L Flat-6	648	+85 Laps
20	GT4	488	(Spain) NM Racing	(Spain) Manel Lao Cornago (United States) Keith Gatehouse (United Kingdom) Branden Lee Oxley (Spain) Jorge Belloc Ruiz	Mercedes-AMG GT4	645	+88 Laps
20	GT4	488	(Spain) NM Racing	(Spain) Manel Lao Cornago (United States) Keith Gatehouse (United Kingdom) Branden Lee Oxley (Spain) Jorge Belloc Ruiz	Mercedes-AMG M178 4.0 L V8	645	+88 Laps
21	GTX	974	(France) Vortex V8	(France) Lionel Amrouche (France) Solenn Amrouche (France) Olivier Gomez (France) Yoann Olivar (France) Arnaud Tsamere	Vortex 2.0	638	+95 Laps
21	GTX	974	(France) Vortex V8	(France) Lionel Amrouche (France) Solenn Amrouche (France) Olivier Gomez (France) Yoann Olivar (France) Arnaud Tsamere	Chevrolet LS3 6.2 L V8	638	+95 Laps
22	GT3 Am	65	(Malaysia) Viper Niza Racing	(Malaysia) Dominic Ang (Malaysia) Douglas Khoo (Malaysia) Melvin Moh (Malaysia) Mohammed Afiq Ikhwan (Malaysia) Aaron Lim	Mercedes-AMG GT3 Evo	633	+100 Laps
22	GT3 Am	65	(Malaysia) Viper Niza Racing	(Malaysia) Dominic Ang (Malaysia) Douglas Khoo (Malaysia) Melvin Moh (Malaysia) Mohammed Afiq Ikhwan (Malaysia) Aaron Lim	Mercedes-AMG M159 6.2 L V8	633	+100 Laps
23	992 Am	949	(Spain) Escuderia Faraon	(Spain) Pablo Bras Silvero (Spain) Pedro Miguel Lourinho Bras (Spain) Agustin Sanabria Crespo (Spain) Fernando Gonzalez Gonzalez (Spain) Francesc Gutierrez Agüi	Porsche 992 GT3 Cup	604	+129 Laps
23	992 Am	949	(Spain) Escuderia Faraon	(Spain) Pablo Bras Silvero (Spain) Pedro Miguel Lourinho Bras (Spain) Agustin Sanabria Crespo (Spain) Fernando Gonzalez Gonzalez (Spain) Francesc Gutierrez Agüi	Porsche 4.0 L Flat-6	604	+129 Laps
24	**TCE**	**102**	**(Germany) asBest Racing**	**(Poland) Rafal Gieras** **(Germany) Pia Ohlsson** **(Germany) Sebastian Schemmann** **(Japan) Junichi Umemoto**	**Cupra TCR DSG**	**591**	**+142 Laps**
24	**TCE**	**102**	**(Germany) asBest Racing**	**(Poland) Rafal Gieras** **(Germany) Pia Ohlsson** **(Germany) Sebastian Schemmann** **(Japan) Junichi Umemoto**	**Volkswagen EA888 2.0 L I4**	**591**	**+142 Laps**
25	TCE	124	(United States) THRW Honda Racing	(Canada) Todd Chiappino (Canada) Lawrence Hwang (United States) Jeremy Lucas (Canada) Scott Nicol	Honda Civic Type-R (FL5)	519	+214 Laps
25	TCE	124	(United States) THRW Honda Racing	(Canada) Todd Chiappino (Canada) Lawrence Hwang (United States) Jeremy Lucas (Canada) Scott Nicol	Honda K20C1 2.0 L Turbo I4	519	+214 Laps
26 DNF	992 Pro	909	(Netherlands) Red Camel-Jordans.nl	(Netherlands) Ivo Breukers (Netherlands) Luc Breukers (Netherlands) Rik Breukers (Switzerland) Fabian Denz	Porsche 992 GT3 Cup	517	Gearbox
26 DNF	992 Pro	909	(Netherlands) Red Camel-Jordans.nl	(Netherlands) Ivo Breukers (Netherlands) Luc Breukers (Netherlands) Rik Breukers (Switzerland) Fabian Denz	Porsche 4.0 L Flat-6	517	Gearbox
27 DNF	TCE	111	(Germany) asBest Racing	(United States) Seth Brown (Denmark) Conrad Tox Leveau (Germany) Desirée Müller (Belgium) Steven Teirlinck	Porsche 718 Cayman GT4 CS (982)	514	Engine
27 DNF	TCE	111	(Germany) asBest Racing	(United States) Seth Brown (Denmark) Conrad Tox Leveau (Germany) Desirée Müller (Belgium) Steven Teirlinck	Porsche 3.8 L Flat-6	514	Engine
28 DNF	GT3 Am	286	(Germany) GetSpeed Performance	(United States) Jon Hirshberg (Australia) Andres Latorre (United States) Patrick Liddy (Germany) Adam Osieka (Ukraine) Yaroslav Veselaho	Mercedes-AMG GT3 Evo	422	Did not finish
28 DNF	GT3 Am	286	(Germany) GetSpeed Performance	(United States) Jon Hirshberg (Australia) Andres Latorre (United States) Patrick Liddy (Germany) Adam Osieka (Ukraine) Yaroslav Veselaho	Mercedes-AMG M159 6.2 L V8	422	Did not finish
29 DNF	TCE	123	(United States) THRW Honda Racing	(United States) Derek Ferretti (United States) Christian Hernandez (United States) Corey Taguchi (United States) Weston Walter	Honda Civic Type-R (FL5)	337	Did not finish
29 DNF	TCE	123	(United States) THRW Honda Racing	(United States) Derek Ferretti (United States) Christian Hernandez (United States) Corey Taguchi (United States) Weston Walter	Honda K20C1 2.0 L Turbo I4	337	Did not finish
DNF	GT3 Pro/Am	98	(United Arab Emirates) Into Africa Racing by Dragon	(South Africa) Stuart White (South Africa) Arnold Neveling (Zimbabwe) Axcil Jefferies (South Africa) Xollie Letlaka	Ferrari 296 GT3	273	Did not finish
DNF	GT3 Pro/Am	98	(United Arab Emirates) Into Africa Racing by Dragon	(South Africa) Stuart White (South Africa) Arnold Neveling (Zimbabwe) Axcil Jefferies (South Africa) Xollie Letlaka	Ferrari F163CE 3.0 L Turbo V6	273	Did not finish
DNF	GT3 Pro	93	(Belgium) Red Ant Racing	(Belgium) Kobe de Breucker (Germany) Kenneth Heyer (Belgium) Ayrton Redant (Belgium) Yannick Redant (Netherlands) Loek Hartog	Mercedes-AMG GT3 Evo	92	Suspension
DNF	GT3 Pro	93	(Belgium) Red Ant Racing	(Belgium) Kobe de Breucker (Germany) Kenneth Heyer (Belgium) Ayrton Redant (Belgium) Yannick Redant (Netherlands) Loek Hartog	Mercedes-AMG M159 6.2 L V8	92	Suspension
DNF	992 Am	938	(France) GP Racing Team	(France) Michael Blanchemain (France) Jérôme Da Costa (France) Cyril Saleilles (France) Loïc Teire	Porsche 992 GT3 Cup	71	Did not finish
DNF	992 Am	938	(France) GP Racing Team	(France) Michael Blanchemain (France) Jérôme Da Costa (France) Cyril Saleilles (France) Loïc Teire	Porsche 4.0 L Flat-6	71	Did not finish
DNF	TCE	133	(United Kingdom) J-Mec Engineering	(United Kingdom) Kevin Clarke (United Kingdom) Steve Cheetham (United Kingdom) James Collins (United Kingdom) Oliver Smith	BMW M3 E46	226	Did not finish
DNF	TCE	133	(United Kingdom) J-Mec Engineering	(United Kingdom) Kevin Clarke (United Kingdom) Steve Cheetham (United Kingdom) James Collins (United Kingdom) Oliver Smith	BMW 3.0 L I4	226	Did not finish

==== Fastest lap ====
Class	No.	Entrant	Driver	Time
GT3	28	(France) TFT Racing	(Germany) Maro Engel	1:40.607
GTX	974	(France) Vortex V8	(France) Solenn Amrouche	1:47.514
992	921	(Belgium) Mühlner Motorsport	(Germany) Julian Hanses	1:44.212
GT4	421	(United Kingdom) Venture Engineering	(United Kingdom) Owen Hizzey	1:50.011
TCE	111	(Germany) asBest Racing	(Denmark) Conrad Tox Leveau	1:52.652

24H Series
Previous race: 12 Hours of Paul Ricard	2025 season	Next race: none
