= 2025 12 Hours of Paul Ricard =

Layout of Circuit Paul Ricard, where the race was held

The 2025 12 Hours of Paul Ricard (known as the 2025 Michelin 12 Hours of Paul Ricard for sponsorship reasons) was an endurance sportscar race held between 5 and 7 July 2025, in Le Castellet, France, as the fourth of five rounds of the 2025 24H Series. It was the fifth running of the event.

== Background ==
The event was announced on 24 September 2024 along with the rest of the 2025 24H Series calendar.

== Entry list ==
The entry list was announced on 4 July 2025, and features 33 entries over 4 classes – 16 in GT3, 4 in GTX, 10 in 992, 2 in GT4.

No.	Entrant	Car	Class	Driver 1	Driver 2	Driver 3	Driver 4	Driver 5
GT3 (16 entries)
11	(Switzerland) Hofor Racing	Mercedes-AMG GT3 Evo	Am	(Germany) Torsten Kratz	(Switzerland) Michael Kroll	(Germany) Maximilian Partl	(Germany) Alexander Prinz	(Switzerland) Chantal Prinz
18	(France) Saintéloc Junior Team	Audi R8 LMS Evo II	PA	(France) Philippe Chatelet	(Austria) Michael Doppelmayr	(Germany) Elia Erhart	(Switzerland) Ernst Inderbitzin	(Germany) Pierre Kaffer
21	(Antigua and Barbuda) HAAS RT	Audi R8 LMS Evo II	Am	(Belgium) Nicolas Guelinckx	(Belgium) Peter Guelinckx	(Belgium) Jef Machiels		
28	(France) TFT Racing	Mercedes-AMG GT3 Evo	PA	(Germany) Nico Bastian	(France) Jordan Boisson	(France) Patrick Charlaix	(Belgium) Benjamin Paque	
42	(New Zealand) Prime Speed Sport	Lamborghini Huracán GT3 Evo 2	PA	(Australia) Nick Foster	(New Zealand) Jono Lester	(New Zealand) Heremana Malmezac	(Finland) Miika Panu	
56	(Czech Republic) Scuderia Praha	Ferrari 296 GT3	PA	(Czech Republic) Josef Král	(Czech Republic) Miroslav Výboh	(Czech Republic) Dennis Waszek		
65	(Malaysia) Viper Niza Racing	Mercedes-AMG GT3 Evo	Am	(Malaysia) Dominic Ang	(Malaysia) Douglas Khoo	(Malaysia) Melvin Moh		
69	(United Kingdom) Continental Racing by Simpson Motorsport	Audi R8 LMS Evo II	Am	David Pogosyan	(Kyrgyzstan) Andrey Solukovtsev	(Cyprus) Vasily Vladykin		
71	(Lithuania) Juta Racing	Audi R8 LMS Evo II	Am	(Lithuania) Arunas Geciauskas	(Italy) Nicola Michelon	(Switzerland) Tim Müller		
72	(Lithuania) Juta Racing	Audi R8 LMS Evo II	Am	(New Zealand) Francois Beziac	(United Kingdom) Tom Jackson	(Zimbabwe) Ameerh Naran		
73	(Germany) Proton Huber Competition	Porsche 911 GT3 R (992)	PA	(Austria) Klaus Bachler	(Germany) Jörg Dreisow	(Germany) Manuel Lauck	(Germany) Mark Wallenwein	
81	(United States) Era Motorsport	Ferrari 296 GT3	PA	(United States) Ryan Dalziel	(United Kingdom) Jake Hill	(Greece) Andreas Laskaratos	(United States) Dwight Merriman	
90	(Spain) E2P Racing	Aston Martin Vantage AMR GT3 Evo	Am	(Spain) Pablo Burguera	(Spain) Olievr Campos	(Spain) Antonio Sainero		
93	(Belgium) Red Ant Racing	Mercedes-AMG GT3 Evo	P	(Belgium) Kobe de Breucker	(Germany) Kenneth Heyer	(Belgium) Ayrton Redant	(Belgium) Yannick Redant	
96	(Lithuania) RD Signs - Siauliai Racing Team	Lamborghini Huracán GT3 Evo	Am	(Lithuania) Audrius Butkevicius	(Lithuania) Vaidas Miciuda	(Lithuania) Paulius Paskevicius	(Lithuania) Paulius Ruskys	
98	(United Arab Emirates) Into Africa Racing by Dragon	Ferrari 296 GT3	PA	(Kuwait) Khaled Al Marzouq	(Canada) Ramez Azzam	(Zimbabwe) Axcil Jefferies	(South Africa) Xollie Letlaka	
GTX (4 entries)
701	(France) Vortex V8	Vortex 2.0		(France) Lionel Amrouche	(France) Philippe Bonnel	(France) Cyril Calmon		
702	(France) Vortex V8	Vortex 2.0		(France) Solenn Amrouche	(France) Philippe Burel	(France) Franck Lefèvre		
703	(France) Vortex V8	Vortex 2.0		(France) Arnoud Gomez	(France) Olivier Gomez	(France) Tom Pieri		
709	(Switzerland) Graff Racing	Nova NP02		(Switzerland) Sébastien Page	(Switzerland) Luis Sanjuan	(France) Eric Trouillet		
992 (10 entries)
888	(France) SebLajoux Racing	Porsche 992 GT3 Cup	Am	(France) Sebastien Lajoux	(Netherlands) Paul Meijer	(France) Stephane Perrin	(Luxembourg) Carlos Rivas	
901	(India) Ajith Kumar Racing by Red Ant	Porsche 992 GT3 Cup	Am	(Belgium) Mathieu Detry	(Belgium) Fabian Duffieux	(India) Ajith Kumar		
902	(Denmark) Holmgaard Motorsport	Porsche 992 GT3 Cup	Am	(Denmark) Jonas Holmgaard	(Denmark) Magnus Holmgaard	(Denmark) Marco Gersager	(Denmark) Patrick Steen Rasmussen	
907	(Germany) RPM Racing	Porsche 992 GT3 Cup	Am	(Germany) Philip Hamprecht	(Sweden) Niclas Jönsson	(United States) Tracy Krohn		
909	(Netherlands) Red Camel-Jordans.nl	Porsche 992 GT3 Cup	P	(Netherlands) Ivo Breukers	(Netherlands) Luc Breukers	(Netherlands) Rik Breukers	(Switzerland) Fabian Denz	
910	(France) SebLajoux Racing	Porsche 992 GT3 Cup	Am	(France) Jeremy Faligand	(France) Jean-Laurent Navarro	(France) Pierre Arnaud Navarro	(Belgium) Giovanni Scamardi	
911	(Germany) 9und11 Racing	Porsche 992 GT3 Cup	Am	(Germany) Georg Goder	(Germany) Ralf Oehme	(Germany) Martin Schlüter	(Germany) Tim Scheerbarth	
921	(Belgium) Mühlner Motorsport	Porsche 992 GT3 Cup	P	(Germany) Julian Hanses	(Estonia) Martin Rump	(Latvia) Valters Zviedris		
928	(Germany) HRT Performance	Porsche 992 GT3 Cup	Am	(Qatar) Jassim Al-Thani	(Germany) Kim André Hauschild	(Switzerland) Silvain Pastoris	(Germany) Axel Sartingen	
957	(Germany) Lionspeed GP	Porsche 992 GT3 Cup	P	(United States) José Garcia	(Germany) Patrick Kolb	(Switzerland) Patric Niederhauser		
GT4 (2 entries)
419	(Belgium) Hamofa Motorsport	BMW M4 GT4 Evo (G82)		(Belgium) Kris Verhoeven	(Belgium) Mark Verhoeven	(Belgium) Rob Verhoeven		
421	(United Kingdom) Venture Engineering	Mercedes-AMG GT4		(United Kingdom) Matthew George	(United Kingdom) Christopher Jones	(United Kingdom) Neville Jones		

GT3 entries
Icon	Class
P	GT3-Pro
PA	GT3-Pro/Am
Am	GT3-Am
992 entries
Icon	Class
P	992-Pro
Am	992-Am

== Schedule ==
Date	Time (local: CET)	Event	Duration
Friday, 4 July	12:00 - 13:30	Free practice	90 minutes
Friday, 4 July	15:30 - 15:45	Qualifying Session 1 - Classes TCE, GT4, GTX & 992	15 minutes
Friday, 4 July	15:50 - 16:05	Qualifying Session 2 - Classes TCE, GT4, GTX & 992	15 minutes
Friday, 4 July	16:10 - 16:25	Qualifying Session 3 - Classes TCE, GT4, GTX & 992	15 minutes
Friday, 4 July	16:40 - 16:55	Qualifying Session 1 - Class GT3	15 minutes
Friday, 4 July	17:00 - 17:15	Qualifying Session 2 - Class GT3	15 minutes
Friday, 4 July	17:20 - 17:35	Qualifying Session 3 - Class GT3	15 minutes
Saturday, 5 July	10:00 - 22:00	Race	12 hours

== Free Practice ==
Class	No.	Entrant	Driver	Time
GT3	73	(Germany) Proton Huber Competition	(Austria) Klaus Bachler	2:02.768
GTX	709	(Switzerland) Graff Racing	(Switzerland) Sébastien Page	2:05.965
992	901	(India) Ajith Kumar Racing by Red Ant	(Belgium) Fabian Duffieux	2:07.742
GT4	421	(United Kingdom) Venture Engineering	(United Kingdom) Matthew George	2:13.639

- Note: Only the fastest car in each class is shown.

== Qualifying ==
Qualifying was split into three parts for both groups. The average of the best times per qualifying session determined the starting order. Dragon Racing secured pole position with a combined average time of 2:03.292.

=== Qualifying results ===
Pole position winners in each class are marked in bold.

==== TCE, GT4, GTX & 992 ====
Pos.	Class	No.	Team	Avg
1	**GTX**	**709**	**(Switzerland) Graff Racing**	**2:06.201**
2	GTX	703	(France) Vortex V8	2:06.800
3	**992 Am**	**888**	**(France) SebLajoux Racing**	**2:08.442**
4	**992 Pro**	**921**	**(Belgium) Mühlner Motorsport**	**2:08.815**
5	GTX	701	(France) Vortex V8	2:08.921
6	992 Am	902	(Denmark) Holmgaard Motorsport	2:09.064
7	GTX	702	(France) Vortex V8	2:09.488
8	992 Am	901	(India) Ajith Kumar Racing by Red Ant	2:09.868
9	992 Am	910	(France) SebLajoux Racing	2:10.000
10	992 Am	928	(Germany) HRT Performance	2:10.888
11	992 Pro	957	(Germany) Lionspeed GP	2:11.736
12	992 Am	911	(Germany) 9und11 Racing	2:12.697
13	**GT4**	**421**	**(United Kingdom) Venture Engineering**	**2:16.964**
14	GT4	419	(Belgium) Hamofa Motorsport	2:18.693
15	992 Am	907	(Germany) RPM Racing	2:10.339
–	992 Pro	909	(Netherlands) Red Camel-Jordans.nl	No time

==== GT3 ====
Pos.	Class	No.	Team	Avg
1	**GT3 Pro/Am**	**98**	**(United Arab Emirates) Into Africa Racing by Dragon**	2:03.292
2	**GT3 Pro**	**93**	**(Belgium) Red Ant Racing**	2:03.789
3	GT3 Pro/Am	28	(France) TFT Racing	2:03.794
4	GT3 Pro/Am	18	(France) Saintéloc Junior Team	2:03.915
5	GT3 Pro/Am	73	(Germany) Proton Huber Competition	2:04.478
6	GT3 Pro/Am	56	(Czech Republic) Scuderia Praha	2:04.740
7	**GT3 Am**	**69**	**(United Kingdom) Continental Racing by Simpson Motorsport**	2:04.830
8	GT3 Pro/Am	42	(New Zealand) Prime Speed Sport	2:05.026
9	GT3 Pro/Am	81	(United States) Era Motorsport	2:05.142
10	GT3 Am	71	(Lithuania) Juta Racing	2:05.196
11	GT3 Am	90	(Spain) E2P Racing	2:05.441
12	GT3 Am	21	(Antigua and Barbuda) HAAS RT	2:05.622
13	GT3 Am	11	(Switzerland) Hofor Racing	2:06.403
14	GT3 Am	96	(Lithuania) RD Signs - Siauliai Racing Team	2:06.664
15	GT3 Am	72	(Lithuania) Juta Racing	2:07.245
16	GT3 Am	65	(Malaysia) Viper Niza Racing	2:04.281

== Race ==
The race was won overall by the No. 73 Proton Huber Competition Porsche followed by the No. 93 Red Ant Racing Mercedes-AMG in second and the No. 28 TFT Racing Mercedes-AMG in third.

=== Race results ===
Class winners are in bold.

Pos	Class	No.	Team	Drivers	Car	Laps	Time/Retired
Pos	Class	No.	Team	Drivers	Engine	Laps	Time/Retired
1	**GT3 Pro/Am**	**73**	**(Germany) Proton Huber Competition**	**(Austria) Klaus Bachler** **(Germany) Jörg Dreisow** **(Germany) Manuel Lauck** **(Germany) Mark Wallenwein**	**Porsche 911 GT3 R (992)**	**308**	**12:00:02.274**
1	**GT3 Pro/Am**	**73**	**(Germany) Proton Huber Competition**	**(Austria) Klaus Bachler** **(Germany) Jörg Dreisow** **(Germany) Manuel Lauck** **(Germany) Mark Wallenwein**	**Porsche M97/80 4.2 L Flat-6**	**308**	**12:00:02.274**
2	**GT3 Pro**	**93**	**(Belgium) Red Ant Racing**	**(Belgium) Kobe de Breucker** **(Germany) Kenneth Heyer** **(Belgium) Ayrton Redant** **(Belgium) Yannick Redant**	**Mercedes-AMG GT3 Evo**	**308**	**+3.473**
2	**GT3 Pro**	**93**	**(Belgium) Red Ant Racing**	**(Belgium) Kobe de Breucker** **(Germany) Kenneth Heyer** **(Belgium) Ayrton Redant** **(Belgium) Yannick Redant**	**Mercedes-AMG M159 6.2 L V8**	**308**	**+3.473**
3	GT3 Pro/Am	28	(France) TFT Racing	(Germany) Nico Bastian (France) Jordan Boisson (France) Patrick Charlaix (Belgium) Benjamin Paque	Mercedes-AMG GT3 Evo	307	+1 Lap
3	GT3 Pro/Am	28	(France) TFT Racing	(Germany) Nico Bastian (France) Jordan Boisson (France) Patrick Charlaix (Belgium) Benjamin Paque	Mercedes-AMG M159 6.2 L V8	307	+1 Lap
4	**GT3 Am**	**69**	**(United Kingdom) Continental Racing by Simpson Motorsport**	**David Pogosyan** **(Kyrgyzstan) Andrey Solukovtsev** **(Cyprus) Vasily Vladykin**	**Audi R8 LMS Evo II**	**306**	**+2 Laps**
4	**GT3 Am**	**69**	**(United Kingdom) Continental Racing by Simpson Motorsport**	**David Pogosyan** **(Kyrgyzstan) Andrey Solukovtsev** **(Cyprus) Vasily Vladykin**	**Audi DAR 5.2 L V10**	**306**	**+2 Laps**
5	GT3 Pro/Am	56	(Czech Republic) Scuderia Praha	(Czech Republic) Josef Král (Czech Republic) Miroslav Výboh (Czech Republic) Dennis Waszek	Ferrari 296 GT3	306	+2 Laps
5	GT3 Pro/Am	56	(Czech Republic) Scuderia Praha	(Czech Republic) Josef Král (Czech Republic) Miroslav Výboh (Czech Republic) Dennis Waszek	Ferrari F163CE 3.0 L Turbo V6	306	+2 Laps
6	GT3 Pro/Am	81	(United States) Era Motorsport	(United States) Ryan Dalziel (United Kingdom) Jake Hill (United States) Dwight Merriman (Greece) Andreas Laskaratos	Ferrari 296 GT3	304	+4 Laps
6	GT3 Pro/Am	81	(United States) Era Motorsport	(United States) Ryan Dalziel (United Kingdom) Jake Hill (United States) Dwight Merriman (Greece) Andreas Laskaratos	Ferrari F163CE 3.0 L Turbo V6	304	+4 Laps
7	GT3 Am	90	(Spain) E2P Racing	(Spain) Pablo Burguera (Spain) Oliver Campos (Spain) Antonio Sainero	Aston Martin Vantage AMR GT3 Evo	305	+3 Laps
7	GT3 Am	90	(Spain) E2P Racing	(Spain) Pablo Burguera (Spain) Oliver Campos (Spain) Antonio Sainero	Aston Martin M177 4.0 L Twin-Turbo V8	305	+3 Laps
8	GT3 Am	65	(Malaysia) Viper Niza Racing	(Malaysia) Dominic Ang (Malaysia) Douglas Khoo (Malaysia) Melvin Moh	Mercedes-AMG GT3 Evo	303	+5 Laps
8	GT3 Am	65	(Malaysia) Viper Niza Racing	(Malaysia) Dominic Ang (Malaysia) Douglas Khoo (Malaysia) Melvin Moh	Mercedes-AMG M159 6.2 L V8	303	+5 Laps
9	**992 Pro**	**921**	**(Belgium) Mühlner Motorsport**	**(Estonia) Martin Rump** **(Latvia) Valters Zviedris** **(Germany) Julian Hanses**	**Porsche 992 GT3 Cup**	**302**	**+6 Laps**
9	**992 Pro**	**921**	**(Belgium) Mühlner Motorsport**	**(Estonia) Martin Rump** **(Latvia) Valters Zviedris** **(Germany) Julian Hanses**	**Porsche 4.0 L Flat-6**	**302**	**+6 Laps**
10	**992 Am**	**902**	**(Denmark) Holmgaard Motorsport**	**(Denmark) Marco Gersager** **(Denmark) Jonas Holmgaard** **(Denmark) Magnus Holmgaard** **(Denmark) Patrick Rasmussen**	**Porsche 992 GT3 Cup**	**301**	**+7 Laps**
10	**992 Am**	**902**	**(Denmark) Holmgaard Motorsport**	**(Denmark) Marco Gersager** **(Denmark) Jonas Holmgaard** **(Denmark) Magnus Holmgaard** **(Denmark) Patrick Rasmussen**	**Porsche 4.0 L Flat-6**	**301**	**+7 Laps**
11	992 Pro	909	(Netherlands) Red Camel-Jordans.nl	(Netherlands) Ivo Breukers (Netherlands) Luc Breukers (Netherlands) Rik Breukers (Switzerland) Fabian Denz	Porsche 992 GT3 Cup	301	+7 Laps
11	992 Pro	909	(Netherlands) Red Camel-Jordans.nl	(Netherlands) Ivo Breukers (Netherlands) Luc Breukers (Netherlands) Rik Breukers (Switzerland) Fabian Denz	Porsche 4.0 L Flat-6	301	+7 Laps
12 DNF	GT3 Pro/Am	18	(France) Saintéloc Junior Team	(France) Philippe Chatelet (Austria) Michael Doppelmayr (Germany) Elia Erhart (Switzerland) Ernst Inderbitzin (Germany) Pierre Kaffer	Audi R8 LMS Evo II	300	Engine
12 DNF	GT3 Pro/Am	18	(France) Saintéloc Junior Team	(France) Philippe Chatelet (Austria) Michael Doppelmayr (Germany) Elia Erhart (Switzerland) Ernst Inderbitzin (Germany) Pierre Kaffer	Audi DAR 5.2 L V10	300	Engine
13	GT3 Am	71	(Lithuania) Juta Racing	(Lithuania) Arunas Geciauskas (Italy) Nicola Michelon (Switzerland) Tim Müller	Audi R8 LMS Evo II	299	+9 Laps
13	GT3 Am	71	(Lithuania) Juta Racing	(Lithuania) Arunas Geciauskas (Italy) Nicola Michelon (Switzerland) Tim Müller	Audi DAR 5.2 L V10	299	+9 Laps
14	GT3 Am	72	(Lithuania) Juta Racing	(New Zealand) Francois Beziac (United Kingdom) Tom Jackson (Zimbabwe) Ameerh Naran	Audi R8 LMS Evo II	298	+10 Laps
14	GT3 Am	72	(Lithuania) Juta Racing	(New Zealand) Francois Beziac (United Kingdom) Tom Jackson (Zimbabwe) Ameerh Naran	Audi DAR 5.2 L V10	298	+10 Laps
15	992 Am	888	(France) SebLajoux Racing	(France) Sebastien Lajoux (Netherlands) Paul Meijer (France) Stephane Perrin (Luxembourg) Carlos Rivas	Porsche 992 GT3 Cup	295	+13 Laps
15	992 Am	888	(France) SebLajoux Racing	(France) Sebastien Lajoux (Netherlands) Paul Meijer (France) Stephane Perrin (Luxembourg) Carlos Rivas	Porsche 4.0 L Flat-6	295	+13 Laps
16	992 Am	910	(France) SebLajoux Racing	(France) Jeremy Faligand (France) Jean-Laurent Navarro (France) Pierre Arnaud Navarro (Belgium) Giovanni Scamardi	Porsche 992 GT3 Cup	295	+13 Laps
16	992 Am	910	(France) SebLajoux Racing	(France) Jeremy Faligand (France) Jean-Laurent Navarro (France) Pierre Arnaud Navarro (Belgium) Giovanni Scamardi	Porsche 4.0 L Flat-6	295	+13 Laps
17	GT3 Pro/Am	98	(United Arab Emirates) Into Africa Racing by Dragon	(Kuwait) Khaled Al Marzouq (Canada) Ramez Azzam (Zimbabwe) Axcil Jefferies (South Africa) Xollie Letlaka	Ferrari 296 GT3	295	+13 Laps
17	GT3 Pro/Am	98	(United Arab Emirates) Into Africa Racing by Dragon	(Kuwait) Khaled Al Marzouq (Canada) Ramez Azzam (Zimbabwe) Axcil Jefferies (South Africa) Xollie Letlaka	Ferrari F163CE 3.0 L Turbo V6	295	+13 Laps
18	GT3 Am	21	(Antigua and Barbuda) HAAS RT	(Belgium) Nicolas Guelinckx (Belgium) Peter Guelinckx (Belgium) Jef Machiels	Audi R8 LMS Evo II	295	+13 Laps
18	GT3 Am	21	(Antigua and Barbuda) HAAS RT	(Belgium) Nicolas Guelinckx (Belgium) Peter Guelinckx (Belgium) Jef Machiels	Audi DAR 5.2 L V10	295	+13 Laps
19	GT3 Am	96	(Lithuania) RD Signs - Siauliai Racing Team	(Lithuania) Audrius Butkevicius (Lithuania) Vaidas Miciuda (Lithuania) Paulius Paskevicius (Lithuania) Paulius Ruskys	Lamborghini Huracán GT3 Evo	292	+16 Laps
19	GT3 Am	96	(Lithuania) RD Signs - Siauliai Racing Team	(Lithuania) Audrius Butkevicius (Lithuania) Vaidas Miciuda (Lithuania) Paulius Paskevicius (Lithuania) Paulius Ruskys	Lamborghini DGF 5.2 L V10	292	+16 Laps
20 DNF	992 Am	901	(India) Ajith Kumar Racing by Red Ant	(Belgium) Mathieu Detry (Belgium) Fabian Duffieux (India) Ajith Kumar	Porsche 992 GT3 Cup	287	+21 Laps
20 DNF	992 Am	901	(India) Ajith Kumar Racing by Red Ant	(Belgium) Mathieu Detry (Belgium) Fabian Duffieux (India) Ajith Kumar	Porsche 4.0 L Flat-6	287	+21 Laps
21 DNF	992 Pro	957	(Germany) Lionspeed GP	(United States) José Garcia (Germany) Patrick Kolb (Switzerland) Patric Niederhauser	Porsche 992 GT3 Cup	287	+21 Laps
21 DNF	992 Pro	957	(Germany) Lionspeed GP	(United States) José Garcia (Germany) Patrick Kolb (Switzerland) Patric Niederhauser	Porsche 4.0 L Flat-6	287	+21 Laps
22	992 Am	911	(Germany) 9und11 Racing	(Germany) Georg Goder (Germany) Ralf Oehme (Germany) Martin Schlüter (Germany) Tim Scheerbarth	Porsche 992 GT3 Cup	287	+21 Laps
22	992 Am	911	(Germany) 9und11 Racing	(Germany) Georg Goder (Germany) Ralf Oehme (Germany) Martin Schlüter (Germany) Tim Scheerbarth	Porsche 4.0 L Flat-6	287	+21 Laps
23	**GTX**	**709**	**(Switzerland) Graff Racing**	**(Switzerland) Sébastien Page** **(Switzerland) Luis Sanjuan** **(France) Eric Trouillet**	**Nova NP02**	**286**	**+22 Laps**
23	**GTX**	**709**	**(Switzerland) Graff Racing**	**(Switzerland) Sébastien Page** **(Switzerland) Luis Sanjuan** **(France) Eric Trouillet**	**Ford Coyote 5.0 L V8**	**286**	**+22 Laps**
24	**GT4**	**421**	**(United Kingdom) Venture Engineering**	**(United Kingdom) Matthew George** **(United Kingdom) Christopher Jones** **(United Kingdom) Neville Jones**	**Mercedes-AMG GT4**	**278**	**+30 Laps**
24	**GT4**	**421**	**(United Kingdom) Venture Engineering**	**(United Kingdom) Matthew George** **(United Kingdom) Christopher Jones** **(United Kingdom) Neville Jones**	**Mercedes-AMG M178 4.0 L V8**	**278**	**+30 Laps**
25	992 Am	907	(Germany) RPM Racing	(Germany) Philip Hamprecht (Sweden) Niclas Jönsson (United States) Tracy Krohn	Porsche 992 GT3 Cup	277	+31 Laps
25	992 Am	907	(Germany) RPM Racing	(Germany) Philip Hamprecht (Sweden) Niclas Jönsson (United States) Tracy Krohn	Porsche 4.0 L Flat-6	277	+31 Laps
26	992 Am	928	(Germany) HRT Performance	(Qatar) Jassim Al-Thani (Germany) Kim André Hauschild (Switzerland) Silvain Pastoris (Germany) Axel Sartingen	Porsche 992 GT3 Cup	275	+33 Laps
26	992 Am	928	(Germany) HRT Performance	(Qatar) Jassim Al-Thani (Germany) Kim André Hauschild (Switzerland) Silvain Pastoris (Germany) Axel Sartingen	Porsche 4.0 L Flat-6	275	+33 Laps
27	GTX	701	(France) Vortex V8	(France) Lionel Amrouche (France) Philippe Bonnel (France) Cyril Calmon	Vortex 2.0	263	+45 Laps
27	GTX	701	(France) Vortex V8	(France) Lionel Amrouche (France) Philippe Bonnel (France) Cyril Calmon	Chevrolet LS3 6.2 L V8	263	+45 Laps
28	GT4	419	(Belgium) Hamofa Motorsport	(Belgium) Kris Verhoeven (Belgium) Mark Verhoeven (Belgium) Rob Verhoeven	BMW M4 GT4 Evo (G82)	268	+40 Laps
28	GT4	419	(Belgium) Hamofa Motorsport	(Belgium) Kris Verhoeven (Belgium) Mark Verhoeven (Belgium) Rob Verhoeven	BMW S58B30T0 3.0 L Twin-Turbo I6	268	+40 Laps
29	GTX	702	(France) Vortex V8	(France) Lionel Amrouche (France) Julien Boillot (France) Alexandre De Bernardinis	Vortex 2.0	250	+58 Laps
29	GTX	702	(France) Vortex V8	(France) Lionel Amrouche (France) Julien Boillot (France) Alexandre De Bernardinis	Chevrolet LS3 6.2 L V8	250	+58 Laps
30 DNF	GT3 Pro/Am	42	(New Zealand) Prime Speed Sport	(Australia) Nick Foster (New Zealand) Jono Lester (New Zealand) Heremana Malmezac (Finland) Miika Panu	Lamborghini Huracán GT3 Evo 2	242	Contact damage
30 DNF	GT3 Pro/Am	42	(New Zealand) Prime Speed Sport	(Australia) Nick Foster (New Zealand) Jono Lester (New Zealand) Heremana Malmezac (Finland) Miika Panu	Lamborghini DGF 5.2 L V10	242	Contact damage
31 DNF	GT3 Am	11	(Switzerland) Hofor Racing	(Switzerland) Michael Kroll (Germany) Torsten Kratz (Germany) Alexander Prinz (Switzerland) Chantal Prinz	Mercedes-AMG GT3 Evo	194	Crash
31 DNF	GT3 Am	11	(Switzerland) Hofor Racing	(Switzerland) Michael Kroll (Germany) Torsten Kratz (Germany) Alexander Prinz (Switzerland) Chantal Prinz	Mercedes-AMG M159 6.2 L V8	194	Crash
DNF	GTX	703	(France) Vortex V8	(France) Arnoud Gomez (France) Olivier Gomez (France) Tom Pieri	Vortex 2.0	126	Gearbox
DNF	GTX	703	(France) Vortex V8	(France) Arnoud Gomez (France) Olivier Gomez (France) Tom Pieri	Chevrolet LS3 6.2 L V8	126	Gearbox

==== Fastest lap ====
Class	No.	Entrant	Driver	Time
GT3	98	(United Arab Emirates) Into Africa Racing by Dragon	(Canada) Ramez Azzam	2:02.801
GTX	709	(Switzerland) Graff Racing	(France) Eric Trouillet	2:04.807
992	957	(Germany) Lionspeed GP	(Switzerland) Patric Niederhauser	2:06.610
GT4	421	(United Kingdom) Venture Engineering	(United Kingdom) Matthew George	2:12.976

24H Series
Previous race: 12 Hours of Misano	2025 season	Next race: 12 Hours of Barcelona
