= Matisse Lismont =

Belgian racing driver (born 2005)

- Lismont in 2026
- Nationality: (Belgium) Belgian
- Born: 10 January 2005 (age 21) Leuven, Belgium
- Categorisation: FIA Silver

Championship titles
- 2026 2026 2026: GT World Challenge Europe – Silver; GT World Challenge Europe Endurance Cup – Silver; GT World Challenge Europe Sprint Cup – Silver

Matisse Lismont (born 10 January 2005) is a Belgian racing driver who last competed for Team WRT in GT World Challenge Europe.

Lismont is a former member of A14 Management, overseen by two-time Formula One world champion Fernando Alonso.

== Career ==
Born in Leuven, Lismont initially began his career in motocross events, but after a trackday experience at Spa in 2021, he took on car racing on a full-time basis. Competing in the VW Fun Cup in 2022, Lismont finished third in the Pure class standings, before returning the following year and scoring a handful of podiums. During 2023, Lismont also raced for PK Carsport in Belcar, most notably winning the 24 Hours of Zolder in the TA class.

Making his GT3 debut in 2024, Lismont joined Comtoyou Racing to compete in a dual campaign in both the GT World Challenge Europe Endurance and Sprint Cups, as a candidate for the Aston Martin Racing Driver Academy. In the Endurance Cup, Lismont mostly raced in the Silver Cup, in which he scored a lone podium at Jeddah, as well as taking a Gold Cup podium in a one-off class appearance at Monza. Competing in the Gold Cup throughout the entire Sprint Cup season, Lismont took a best overall result of 11th at Barcelona and finished fifth in the class standings at season's end. During 2024, Lismont also finished third in International GT Open's Spa 500 for Comtoyou and won on his NLS debut in the BMW M2 CS class with the same team.

At the beginning of 2025, Lismont remained with Comtoyou to compete in the Dubai 24 Hour and select rounds of the GT Winter Series. Lismont was then set to continue with the Belgian team for another dual campaign in the GT World Challenge Europe Endurance and Sprint Cups, before switching to Corvette-aligned Steller Motorsport on the eve of the season. Having taken a Silver Cup podium at Le Castellet in the Endurance Cup, Lismont split with Steller after the 24 Hours of Spa due to contractual issues and joined BMW-fielding Team WRT to complete the season. Following the team change, Lismont most notably scored a class win and podium at Valencia in the Sprint Cup to take 11th in the Silver's standings. During 2025, Lismont also won the 12 Hours of Misano overall, as well as finishing second at the 24 Hours of Barcelona with Audi-fielding HAAS RT. Towards the end of the year, Lismont joined EBM for the Sepang round of the 2025–26 Asian Le Mans Series in the GT class, before reuniting with HAAS RT to race at the 2026 Dubai 24 Hour.

For the rest of 2026, Lismont returned to Team WRT to compete in the GT World Challenge Europe Endurance and Sprint Cups, sharing a BMW M4 GT3 Evo with Amaury Cordeel and Ignacio Montenegro. In the former, Lismont took a lone class win at Algarve and three other class podiums to secure the Endurance and Europe Silver Cup titles. In the Sprint Cup, he and Montenegro sealed the Silver Cup title by taking five class wins, which included an overall podium at Magny-Cours.

== Racing record ==
=== Racing career summary ===
Season	Series	Team	Races	Wins	Poles	F/Laps	Podiums	Points	Position
2022	VW Fun Cup – Pure	Clubsport Racing							**3rd**
2023	VW Fun Cup – Pure	Clubsport Racing							
2023	Belcar	PK Carsport							
2023	24 Hours of Zolder – TA	PK Carsport	1	1	0	0	1	—N/a	**1st**
2024	GT World Challenge Europe Endurance Cup	Comtoyou Racing	5	0	0	0	0	2	29th
2024	GT World Challenge Europe Endurance Cup – Silver	Comtoyou Racing	4	0	0	0	1	56	8th
2024	GT World Challenge Europe Endurance Cup – Gold	Comtoyou Racing	1	0	0	0	1	16	15th
2024	GT World Challenge Europe Sprint Cup	Comtoyou Racing	9	0	0	0	0	0	NC
2024	GT World Challenge Europe Sprint Cup – Gold	Comtoyou Racing	9	0	0	0	0	52	5th
2024	International GT Open	Comtoyou Racing	1	0	0	0	1	20	21st
2024	Nürburgring Langstrecken-Serie – BMW M2 CS	Comtoyou Racing	1	1	0	0	1	0	NC
2025	Middle East Trophy – GT3	Comtoyou Racing	1	0	0	0	0	0	NC
2025	GT Winter Series – GT3	Comtoyou Racing	6	2	0	0	5	96	5th
2025	GT World Challenge Europe Endurance Cup	Steller Motorsport	3	0	0	0	0	0	NC
2025	GT World Challenge Europe Endurance Cup	Team WRT	2	0	0	0	0	0	NC
2025	GT World Challenge Europe Endurance Cup – Silver	Steller Motorsport	3	0	0	0	1	47	6th
2025	GT World Challenge Europe Endurance Cup – Silver	Team WRT	2	0	0	0	0	47	6th
2025	GT World Challenge Europe Sprint Cup	Steller Motorsport	4	0	0	0	0	8	18th
2025	GT World Challenge Europe Sprint Cup	Team WRT	2	0	0	0	0	8	18th
2025	GT World Challenge Europe Sprint Cup – Silver	Steller Motorsport	4	0	0	0	0	32	11th
2025	GT World Challenge Europe Sprint Cup – Silver	Team WRT	2	1	0	0	2	32	11th
2025	International GT Open	Saintéloc Racing	2	0	0	0	0	5	31st
2025	24H Series – GT3	HAAS RT	2	1	0	0	2	92	NC
2025	24 Hours of Zolder – GT Cup	HAAS RT	1	0	0	0	0	—N/a	9th
2025	Porsche Endurance Trophy Nürburgring Cup – CUP3	Lionspeed GP	1	0	0	0	0	0	NC
2025–26	Asian Le Mans Series – GT	EBM	2	0	0	0	0	6	23rd
2025–26	24H Series Middle East – GT3 Am	HAAS RT	1	0	0	0	0	0	NC
2026	GT World Challenge Europe Endurance Cup	Team WRT	5	0	0	0	0	10	24th
2026	GT World Challenge Europe Endurance Cup – Silver	Team WRT	5	1	2	0	4	113	**1st**
2026	GT World Challenge Europe Sprint Cup	Team WRT	10	0	0	0	1	17.5	18th
2026	GT World Challenge Europe Sprint Cup – Silver	Team WRT	10	5	4	2	8	123	**1st**
2026	Intercontinental GT Challenge	Team WRT	1	0	0	0	0	0	NC

* Season still in progress.

^{†} As Lismont was a guest driver, he was ineligible for points.

=== Complete GT World Challenge Europe results ===
==== GT World Challenge Europe Endurance Cup ====
(key) (Races in bold indicate pole position) (Races in italics indicate fastest lap)

Year	Team	Car	Class	1	2	3	4	5	6	7	Pos.	Points
2024	Comtoyou Racing	Aston Martin Vantage AMR GT3 Evo	Silver	LEC; 41	SPA; 6H; 8	SPA; 12H; 45	SPA; 24H; 32	NÜR; 45		JED; 23	8th	56
2024	Comtoyou Racing	Aston Martin Vantage AMR GT3 Evo	Gold						MNZ; 32		15th	16
2025	Steller Motorsport	Chevrolet Corvette Z06 GT3.R	Silver	LEC; 19	MNZ; 32	SPA; 6H; 19	SPA; 12H; 52	SPA; 24H; 40			6th	47
2025	Team WRT	BMW M4 GT3 Evo	Silver						NÜR; 24	CAT; 50	6th	47
2026	Team WRT	BMW M4 GT3 Evo	Silver	LEC; 18	MNZ; 17	SPA; 6H; 24	SPA; 12H; 20	SPA; 24H; 15	**NÜR**; 14	**ALG**; 5	1st	113

==== GT World Challenge Europe Sprint Cup ====
(key) (Races in bold indicate pole position) (Races in italics indicate fastest lap)

Year	Team	Car	Class	1	2	3	4	5	6	7	8	9	10	Pos.	Points
2024	Comtoyou Racing	Aston Martin Vantage AMR GT3 Evo	Gold	BRH; 1; 23†	BRH; 2; 24	MIS; 1; 28	MIS; 2; 31	HOC; 1; 21	HOC; 2; 30	MAG; 1; 27	MAG; 2 DNS	**CAT**; **1**; 11	CAT; 2; 20	5th	52
2025	Steller Motorsport	Chevrolet Corvette Z06 GT3.R	Silver	BRH; 1; 26	BRH; 2; 23	ZAN; 1 Ret	ZAN; 2; 23	MIS; 1	MIS; 2	MAG; 1	MAG; 2			11th	32
2025	Team WRT	BMW M4 GT3 Evo	Silver									VAL; 1; 5	VAL; 2; 8	11th	32
2026	Team WRT	BMW M4 GT3 Evo	Silver	**BRH**; **1**; 15	**BRH**; **2**; 8	MIS; 1; 10	MIS; 2; 17	MAG; 1; 13	**MAG**; **2**; 2	**ZAN**; **1**; 8	ZAN; 2; 16	CAT; 1; 33	CAT; 2 Ret	1st	123

=== Complete International GT Open results ===
Year	Team	Car	Class	1	2	3	4	5	6	7	8	9	10	11	12	13	14	Pos.	Points
2024	Comtoyou Racing	Aston Martin Vantage AMR GT3 Evo	Pro	ALG; 1	ALG; 2	HOC; 1	HOC; 2	SPA; 3	HUN; 1	HUN; 2	LEC; 1	LEC; 2	RBR; 1	RBR; 2	CAT; 1	CAT; 2	MNZ	21st	20
2025	Saintéloc Racing	Audi R8 LMS Evo II	Pro	ALG; 1	ALG; 2	SPA	HOC; 1; 9	HOC; 2; 8	HUN; 1	HUN; 2	LEC; 1	LEC; 2	RBR; 1	RBR; 2	CAT; 1	CAT; 2	MNZ	31st	5

=== Complete Asian Le Mans Series results ===
(key) (Races in bold indicate pole position) (Races in italics indicate fastest lap)

Year	Team	Class	Car	Engine	1	2	3	4	5	6	Pos.	Points
2025–26	Earl Bamber Motorsport	GT	Aston Martin Vantage AMR GT3	Aston Martin M177 4.0 L Turbo V8	SEP; 1; 7	SEP; 2; 14	DUB; 1	DUB; 2	ABU; 1	ABU; 2	23rd	6
