= 2025 24H Series =

Eleventh season of the Creventic 24H Series

The Michelin 2025 24H Series was the eleventh season of the 24H Series with drivers battling for championship points and titles, and the sixteenth season since Creventic, the organiser and promoter of the series, organised multiple races a year. The races were contested with GT3-spec cars, GT4-spec cars, sports cars and 24H-Specials, like silhouette cars, TCR Touring Cars, TCX cars and TC cars.

== Calendar ==
The calendar was released on September 24, 2024, and featured one change with the Circuit Paul Ricard replacing the round at Portimão.

Round	Event	Circuit	Date
1	12 Hours of Mugello	Mugello Circuit, Scarperia e San Piero, Italy	21–23 March
2	12 Hours of Spa-Francorchamps	Circuit de Spa-Francorchamps, Stavelot, Belgium	18–20 April
3	12 Hours of Misano	Misano World Circuit Marco Simoncelli, Misano Adriatico, Italy	23–24 May
4	12 Hours of Paul Ricard	Circuit Paul Ricard, Le Castellet, Var, France	5–7 July
5	24 Hours of Barcelona	Circuit de Barcelona-Catalunya, Montmeló, Spain	26–28 September

== Teams and drivers ==
Team	Car	Engine	No.	Drivers	Class	Rounds
GT3
(Antigua and Barbuda) HAAS RT	Audi R8 LMS Evo II	Audi DAR 5.2 L V10	2	(United Kingdom) Tom Jackson	Am	2
(Antigua and Barbuda) HAAS RT	Audi R8 LMS Evo II	Audi DAR 5.2 L V10	2	(Zimbabwe) Ameerh Naran	Am	2
(Antigua and Barbuda) HAAS RT	Audi R8 LMS Evo II	Audi DAR 5.2 L V10	21	(Belgium) Olivier Bertels	Am	2
(Antigua and Barbuda) HAAS RT	Audi R8 LMS Evo II	Audi DAR 5.2 L V10	21	(Belgium) Xavier Knauf	Am	2
(Antigua and Barbuda) HAAS RT	Audi R8 LMS Evo II	Audi DAR 5.2 L V10	21	(Belgium) Gregory Servais	Am	2
(Antigua and Barbuda) HAAS RT	Audi R8 LMS Evo II	Audi DAR 5.2 L V10	21	(Belgium) Peter Guelinckx	Am	3–4
(Antigua and Barbuda) HAAS RT	Audi R8 LMS Evo II	Audi DAR 5.2 L V10	21	(Belgium) Jef Machiels	Am	3–4
(Antigua and Barbuda) HAAS RT	Audi R8 LMS Evo II	Audi DAR 5.2 L V10	21	(Belgium) Matisse Lismont	Am	3
(Antigua and Barbuda) HAAS RT	Audi R8 LMS Evo II	Audi DAR 5.2 L V10	21	(Belgium) Nicolas Guelinckx	Am	4
(Antigua and Barbuda) HAAS RT	Audi R8 LMS Evo II	Audi DAR 5.2 L V10	21	(Canada) Ramez Azzam	P	5
(Antigua and Barbuda) HAAS RT	Audi R8 LMS Evo II	Audi DAR 5.2 L V10	21	(Belgium) Nicolas Guelinckx	P	5
(Antigua and Barbuda) HAAS RT	Audi R8 LMS Evo II	Audi DAR 5.2 L V10	21	(Belgium) Peter Guelinckx	P	5
(Antigua and Barbuda) HAAS RT	Audi R8 LMS Evo II	Audi DAR 5.2 L V10	21	(Belgium) Matisse Lismont	P	5
(Switzerland) Kessel Racing	Ferrari 296 GT3	Ferrari F163CE 3.0 L Turbo V6	8	(Italy) Alessandro Cutrera	PA	1
(Switzerland) Kessel Racing	Ferrari 296 GT3	Ferrari F163CE 3.0 L Turbo V6	8	(Italy) Leonardo-Maria del Vecchio	PA	1
(Switzerland) Kessel Racing	Ferrari 296 GT3	Ferrari F163CE 3.0 L Turbo V6	8	(Italy) Marco Frezza	PA	1
(Switzerland) Kessel Racing	Ferrari 296 GT3	Ferrari F163CE 3.0 L Turbo V6	8	(Italy) David Fumanelli	PA	1
(Switzerland) Kessel Racing	Ferrari 296 GT3	Ferrari F163CE 3.0 L Turbo V6	8	(United Kingdom) Matt Bell	PA	2
(Switzerland) Kessel Racing	Ferrari 296 GT3	Ferrari F163CE 3.0 L Turbo V6	8	(United States) Dustin Blattner	PA	2
(Switzerland) Kessel Racing	Ferrari 296 GT3	Ferrari F163CE 3.0 L Turbo V6	8	(Germany) Constantin Dressler	PA	2
(Switzerland) Kessel Racing	Ferrari 296 GT3	Ferrari F163CE 3.0 L Turbo V6	8	(United States) Blake McDonald	PA	2
(Switzerland) Hofor Racing	Mercedes-AMG GT3 Evo	Mercedes-AMG M159 6.2 L V8	11	(Switzerland) Michael Kroll	Am	All
(Switzerland) Hofor Racing	Mercedes-AMG GT3 Evo	Mercedes-AMG M159 6.2 L V8	11	(Germany) Alexander Prinz	Am	All
(Switzerland) Hofor Racing	Mercedes-AMG GT3 Evo	Mercedes-AMG M159 6.2 L V8	11	(Switzerland) Chantal Prinz	Am	All
(Switzerland) Hofor Racing	Mercedes-AMG GT3 Evo	Mercedes-AMG M159 6.2 L V8	11	(Germany) Maximilian Partl	Am	1, 3–5
(Switzerland) Hofor Racing	Mercedes-AMG GT3 Evo	Mercedes-AMG M159 6.2 L V8	11	(Germany) Torsten Kratz	Am	2, 4–5
(France) Saintéloc Junior Team	Audi R8 LMS Evo II	Audi DAR 5.2 L V10	18	(Austria) Michael Doppelmayr	PA	4–5
(France) Saintéloc Junior Team	Audi R8 LMS Evo II	Audi DAR 5.2 L V10	18	(Germany) Elia Erhart	PA	4–5
(France) Saintéloc Junior Team	Audi R8 LMS Evo II	Audi DAR 5.2 L V10	18	(Switzerland) Ernst Inderbitzin	PA	4–5
(France) Saintéloc Junior Team	Audi R8 LMS Evo II	Audi DAR 5.2 L V10	18	(Germany) Pierre Kaffer	PA	4–5
(France) Saintéloc Junior Team	Audi R8 LMS Evo II	Audi DAR 5.2 L V10	18	(France) Philippe Chatelet	PA	4
(France) Saintéloc Junior Team	Audi R8 LMS Evo II	Audi DAR 5.2 L V10	18	(France) Stephane Tribaudini	PA	5
(Italy) Pellin Racing	Ferrari 488 GT3 Evo 2020	Ferrari F154CB 3.9 L Turbo V8	23	(United States) Thor Haugen	P	1–2
(Italy) Pellin Racing	Ferrari 488 GT3 Evo 2020	Ferrari F154CB 3.9 L Turbo V8	23	(Italy) Paolo Ruberti	P	1–2
(Italy) Pellin Racing	Ferrari 296 GT3	Ferrari F163CE 3.0 L Turbo V6	29	(United States) Lisa Clark	P	1–2
(Italy) Pellin Racing	Ferrari 296 GT3	Ferrari F163CE 3.0 L Turbo V6	29	(Canada) Kyle Marcelli	P	1–2
(Italy) Pellin Racing	Ferrari 296 GT3	Ferrari F163CE 3.0 L Turbo V6	29	(Italy) Felice Jelmini	P	1–2
(United States) Heart of Racing by SPS	Mercedes-AMG GT3 Evo	Mercedes-AMG M159 6.2 L V8	27	(United States) Hannah Grisham	Am	1
(United States) Heart of Racing by SPS	Mercedes-AMG GT3 Evo	Mercedes-AMG M159 6.2 L V8	27	(United Kingdom) Ian James	Am	1
(United States) Heart of Racing by SPS	Mercedes-AMG GT3 Evo	Mercedes-AMG M159 6.2 L V8	27	(United States) Gray Newell	Am	1
(France) TFT Racing	Mercedes-AMG GT3 Evo	Mercedes-AMG M159 6.2 L V8	28	(France) Jordan Boisson	PA	4–5
(France) TFT Racing	Mercedes-AMG GT3 Evo	Mercedes-AMG M159 6.2 L V8	28	(France) Patrick Charlaix	PA	4–5
(France) TFT Racing	Mercedes-AMG GT3 Evo	Mercedes-AMG M159 6.2 L V8	28	(Belgium) Benjamin Paque	PA	4–5
(France) TFT Racing	Mercedes-AMG GT3 Evo	Mercedes-AMG M159 6.2 L V8	28	(Germany) Nico Bastian	PA	4
(France) TFT Racing	Mercedes-AMG GT3 Evo	Mercedes-AMG M159 6.2 L V8	28	(Germany) Maro Engel	PA	5
(New Zealand) Prime Speed Sport	Lamborghini Huracán GT3 Evo 2	Lamborghini DGF 5.2 L V10	42	(Australia) Nick Foster	PA	4
(New Zealand) Prime Speed Sport	Lamborghini Huracán GT3 Evo 2	Lamborghini DGF 5.2 L V10	42	(New Zealand) Jono Lester	PA	4
(New Zealand) Prime Speed Sport	Lamborghini Huracán GT3 Evo 2	Lamborghini DGF 5.2 L V10	42	(New Zealand) Heremana Malmezac	PA	4
(New Zealand) Prime Speed Sport	Lamborghini Huracán GT3 Evo 2	Lamborghini DGF 5.2 L V10	42	(Finland) Miika Panu	PA	4
(Slovakia) ARC Bratislava	Lamborghini Huracán GT3 Evo 1 Lamborghini Huracán GT3 Evo 2 2	Lamborghini DGF 5.2 L V10	44	(Slovakia) Miro Konôpka	Am	1–2
(Slovakia) ARC Bratislava	Lamborghini Huracán GT3 Evo 1 Lamborghini Huracán GT3 Evo 2 2	Lamborghini DGF 5.2 L V10	44	(China) Liang Jiatong	Am	1–2
(Slovakia) ARC Bratislava	Lamborghini Huracán GT3 Evo 1 Lamborghini Huracán GT3 Evo 2 2	Lamborghini DGF 5.2 L V10	44	(Slovakia) Zdeno Mikulasko	Am	1
(Slovakia) ARC Bratislava	Lamborghini Huracán GT3 Evo 1 Lamborghini Huracán GT3 Evo 2 2	Lamborghini DGF 5.2 L V10	44	(Austria) Gerhard Tweraser	Am	1
(Slovakia) ARC Bratislava	Lamborghini Huracán GT3 Evo 1 Lamborghini Huracán GT3 Evo 2 2	Lamborghini DGF 5.2 L V10	44	(Slovakia) Adam Konôpka	Am	2
(Slovakia) ARC Bratislava	Lamborghini Huracán GT3 Evo 1 Lamborghini Huracán GT3 Evo 2 2	Lamborghini DGF 5.2 L V10	44	(Poland) Andrzej Lewandowski	Am	2
(Czech Republic) Scuderia Praha	Ferrari 296 GT3	Ferrari F163CE 3.0 L Turbo V6	56	(Czech Republic) Josef Král	PA	All
(Czech Republic) Scuderia Praha	Ferrari 296 GT3	Ferrari F163CE 3.0 L Turbo V6	56	(Slovakia) Miroslav Výboh	PA	All
(Czech Republic) Scuderia Praha	Ferrari 296 GT3	Ferrari F163CE 3.0 L Turbo V6	56	(Slovakia) Matúš Výboh	PA	1–3, 5
(Czech Republic) Scuderia Praha	Ferrari 296 GT3	Ferrari F163CE 3.0 L Turbo V6	56	(Czech Republic) Dennis Waszek	PA	2–5
(Italy) MP Racing	Mercedes-AMG GT3 Evo	Mercedes-AMG M159 6.2 L V8	58	(Italy) Corinna Gostner	Am	1
(Italy) MP Racing	Mercedes-AMG GT3 Evo	Mercedes-AMG M159 6.2 L V8	58	(Italy) David Gostner	Am	1
(Italy) MP Racing	Mercedes-AMG GT3 Evo	Mercedes-AMG M159 6.2 L V8	58	(Italy) Manuela Gostner	Am	1
(Italy) MP Racing	Mercedes-AMG GT3 Evo	Mercedes-AMG M159 6.2 L V8	58	(Italy) Thomas Gostner	Am	1
(Malaysia) Viper Niza Racing	Mercedes-AMG GT3 Evo	Mercedes-AMG M159 6.2 L V8	65	(Malaysia) Dominic Ang	Am	2–5
(Malaysia) Viper Niza Racing	Mercedes-AMG GT3 Evo	Mercedes-AMG M159 6.2 L V8	65	(Malaysia) Douglas Khoo	Am	2–5
(Malaysia) Viper Niza Racing	Mercedes-AMG GT3 Evo	Mercedes-AMG M159 6.2 L V8	65	(Malaysia) Melvin Moh	Am	2–5
(Malaysia) Viper Niza Racing	Mercedes-AMG GT3 Evo	Mercedes-AMG M159 6.2 L V8	65	(Malaysia) Mohammed Afiq Ikhwan	Am	5
(Malaysia) Viper Niza Racing	Mercedes-AMG GT3 Evo	Mercedes-AMG M159 6.2 L V8	65	(Malaysia) Aaron Lim	Am	5
(United Kingdom) Continental Racing by Simpson Motorsport	Audi R8 LMS Evo II	Audi DAR 5.2 L V10	69	(Kyrgyzstan) Andrey Solukovtsev	Am	All
(United Kingdom) Continental Racing by Simpson Motorsport	Audi R8 LMS Evo II	Audi DAR 5.2 L V10	69	(Cyprus) Vasily Vladykin	Am	All
(United Kingdom) Continental Racing by Simpson Motorsport	Audi R8 LMS Evo II	Audi DAR 5.2 L V10	69	David Pogosyan (Note: Denisov, Kizilov, Pogosyan, Sergey Titarenko and Victor Titarenko are Russians, but compete as neutral competitors as Russian national emblems were banned by the FIA following the Russian invasion of Ukraine.)	Am	1–4
(United Kingdom) Continental Racing by Simpson Motorsport	Audi R8 LMS Evo II	Audi DAR 5.2 L V10	69	(Germany) Alex Arkin Aka	Am	5
(United Kingdom) Continental Racing by Simpson Motorsport	Audi R8 LMS Evo II	Audi DAR 5.2 L V10	69	(United Kingdom) Sacha Kakad	Am	5
(United Kingdom) Continental Racing by Simpson Motorsport	Audi R8 LMS Evo II	Audi DAR 5.2 L V10	69	Maksim Kizilov	Am	5
(Lithuania) Juta Racing	Audi R8 LMS Evo II	Audi DAR 5.2 L V10	71	(Lithuania) Arunas Geciauskas	Am	All
(Lithuania) Juta Racing	Audi R8 LMS Evo II	Audi DAR 5.2 L V10	71	(Italy) Nicola Michelon	Am	All
(Lithuania) Juta Racing	Audi R8 LMS Evo II	Audi DAR 5.2 L V10	71	(Switzerland) Tim Müller	Am	1–4
(Lithuania) Juta Racing	Audi R8 LMS Evo II	Audi DAR 5.2 L V10	71	(United Kingdom) Gavin Pickering	Am	5
(Lithuania) Juta Racing	Audi R8 LMS Evo II	Audi DAR 5.2 L V10	71	(United Kingdom) Lars Viljoen	Am	5
(Lithuania) Juta Racing	Audi R8 LMS Evo II	Audi DAR 5.2 L V10	71	(China) Zhang Yaqi	Am	5
(Lithuania) Juta Racing	Audi R8 LMS Evo II	Audi DAR 5.2 L V10	72	(New Zealand) Francois Beziac	Am	4
(Lithuania) Juta Racing	Audi R8 LMS Evo II	Audi DAR 5.2 L V10	72	(United Kingdom) Tom Jackson	Am	4
(Lithuania) Juta Racing	Audi R8 LMS Evo II	Audi DAR 5.2 L V10	72	(Zimbabwe) Ameerh Naran	Am	4
(Germany) Proton Huber Competition	Porsche 911 GT3 R (992)	Porsche M97/80 4.2 L Flat-6	73	(Austria) Klaus Bachler	PA	All
(Germany) Proton Huber Competition	Porsche 911 GT3 R (992)	Porsche M97/80 4.2 L Flat-6	73	(Germany) Jörg Dreisow	PA	All
(Germany) Proton Huber Competition	Porsche 911 GT3 R (992)	Porsche M97/80 4.2 L Flat-6	73	(Germany) Manuel Lauck	PA	All
(Germany) Proton Huber Competition	Porsche 911 GT3 R (992)	Porsche M97/80 4.2 L Flat-6	73	(Netherlands) Laura van den Hengel	PA	1
(Germany) Proton Huber Competition	Porsche 911 GT3 R (992)	Porsche M97/80 4.2 L Flat-6	73	(Germany) Constantin Dressler	PA	2–3, 5
(Germany) Proton Huber Competition	Porsche 911 GT3 R (992)	Porsche M97/80 4.2 L Flat-6	73	(Germany) Mark Wallenwein	PA	4
(United States) Era Motorsport	Ferrari 296 GT3	Ferrari F163CE 3.0 L Twin Turbo V6	81	(United States) Ryan Dalziel	PA	All
(United States) Era Motorsport	Ferrari 296 GT3	Ferrari F163CE 3.0 L Twin Turbo V6	81	(United States) Dwight Merriman	PA	All
(United States) Era Motorsport	Ferrari 296 GT3	Ferrari F163CE 3.0 L Twin Turbo V6	81	(United States) Kyle Tilley	PA	1–3, 5
(United States) Era Motorsport	Ferrari 296 GT3	Ferrari F163CE 3.0 L Twin Turbo V6	81	(United Kingdom) Jake Hill	PA	1–2, 4–5
(United States) Era Motorsport	Ferrari 296 GT3	Ferrari F163CE 3.0 L Twin Turbo V6	81	(Belgium) Nico Verdonck	PA	3
(United States) Era Motorsport	Ferrari 296 GT3	Ferrari F163CE 3.0 L Twin Turbo V6	81	(Greece) Andreas Laskaratos	PA	4
(United States) Era Motorsport	Ferrari 296 GT3	Ferrari F163CE 3.0 L Twin Turbo V6	81	(United Kingdom) Oliver Bryant	PA	5
(Spain) E2P Racing	Aston Martin Vantage AMR GT3 Evo	Aston Martin M177 4.0 L Twin-Turbo V8	90	(Spain) Pablo Burguera	Am	All
(Spain) E2P Racing	Aston Martin Vantage AMR GT3 Evo	Aston Martin M177 4.0 L Twin-Turbo V8	90	(Spain) Oliver Campos	Am	All
(Spain) E2P Racing	Aston Martin Vantage AMR GT3 Evo	Aston Martin M177 4.0 L Twin-Turbo V8	90	(Spain) Antonio Sainero	Am	All
(Spain) E2P Racing	Aston Martin Vantage AMR GT3 Evo	Aston Martin M177 4.0 L Twin-Turbo V8	90	(Spain) Javier Morcillo	Am	5
(Belgium) Red Ant Racing	Mercedes-AMG GT3 Evo	Mercedes-AMG M159 6.2 L V8	93	(Belgium) Kobe de Breucker	P	All
(Belgium) Red Ant Racing	Mercedes-AMG GT3 Evo	Mercedes-AMG M159 6.2 L V8	93	(Germany) Kenneth Hayer	P	All
(Belgium) Red Ant Racing	Mercedes-AMG GT3 Evo	Mercedes-AMG M159 6.2 L V8	93	(Belgium) Ayrton Redant	P	All
(Belgium) Red Ant Racing	Mercedes-AMG GT3 Evo	Mercedes-AMG M159 6.2 L V8	93	(Belgium) Yannick Redant	P	All
(Belgium) Red Ant Racing	Mercedes-AMG GT3 Evo	Mercedes-AMG M159 6.2 L V8	93	(Netherlands) Loek Hartog	P	5
(Italy) Manamauri Energy by Ebimotors	Porsche 911 GT3 R (992)	Porsche M97/80 4.2 L Flat-6	95	(Italy) Fabrizio Broggi	PA	1
(Italy) Manamauri Energy by Ebimotors	Porsche 911 GT3 R (992)	Porsche M97/80 4.2 L Flat-6	95	(Italy) Sabino de Castro	PA	1
(Italy) Manamauri Energy by Ebimotors	Porsche 911 GT3 R (992)	Porsche M97/80 4.2 L Flat-6	95	(Romania) Sergiu Nicolae	PA	1
(Lithuania) RD Signs - Siauliai Racing Team	Lamborghini Huracán GT3 Evo	Lamborghini DGF 5.2 L V10	96	(Lithuania) Audrius Butkevicius	Am	4
(Lithuania) RD Signs - Siauliai Racing Team	Lamborghini Huracán GT3 Evo	Lamborghini DGF 5.2 L V10	96	(Lithuania) Vaidas Miciuda	Am	4
(Lithuania) RD Signs - Siauliai Racing Team	Lamborghini Huracán GT3 Evo	Lamborghini DGF 5.2 L V10	96	(Lithuania) Paulius Paskevicius	Am	4
(Lithuania) RD Signs - Siauliai Racing Team	Lamborghini Huracán GT3 Evo	Lamborghini DGF 5.2 L V10	96	(Lithuania) Paulius Ruskys	Am	4
(United Arab Emirates) Into Africa Racing by Dragon	Ferrari 296 GT3	Ferrari F163CE 3.0 L Turbo V6	98	(Kuwait) Khaled Al Marzouq	PA	4
(United Arab Emirates) Into Africa Racing by Dragon	Ferrari 296 GT3	Ferrari F163CE 3.0 L Turbo V6	98	(Canada) Ramez Azzam	PA	4
(United Arab Emirates) Into Africa Racing by Dragon	Ferrari 296 GT3	Ferrari F163CE 3.0 L Turbo V6	98	(Zimbabwe) Axcil Jefferies	PA	4
(United Arab Emirates) Into Africa Racing by Dragon	Ferrari 296 GT3	Ferrari F163CE 3.0 L Turbo V6	98	(South Africa) Xollie Letlaka	PA	4
(United Arab Emirates) Into Africa Racing by Dragon	Ferrari 296 GT3	Ferrari F163CE 3.0 L Turbo V6	98	(Zimbabwe) Axcil Jefferies	P	5
(United Arab Emirates) Into Africa Racing by Dragon	Ferrari 296 GT3	Ferrari F163CE 3.0 L Turbo V6	98	(South Africa) Xollie Letlaka	P	5
(United Arab Emirates) Into Africa Racing by Dragon	Ferrari 296 GT3	Ferrari F163CE 3.0 L Turbo V6	98	(South Africa) Arnold Neveling	P	5
(United Arab Emirates) Into Africa Racing by Dragon	Ferrari 296 GT3	Ferrari F163CE 3.0 L Turbo V6	98	(South Africa) Stuart White	P	5
(Germany) Ziggo Sport - Tempesta Racing	Porsche 911 GT3 R (992)	Porsche M97/80 4.2 L Flat-6	193	(Hong Kong) Jonathan Hui	P	2
(Germany) Ziggo Sport - Tempesta Racing	Porsche 911 GT3 R (992)	Porsche M97/80 4.2 L Flat-6	193	(United Kingdom) Chris Froggatt	P	2
(Germany) Ziggo Sport - Tempesta Racing	Porsche 911 GT3 R (992)	Porsche M97/80 4.2 L Flat-6	193	(Netherlands) Loek Hartog	P	2
(Germany) GetSpeed Performance	Mercedes-AMG GT3 Evo	Mercedes-AMG M159 6.2 L V8	286	(United States) Jon Hirshberg	Am	5
(Germany) GetSpeed Performance	Mercedes-AMG GT3 Evo	Mercedes-AMG M159 6.2 L V8	286	(Australia) Andres Latorre	Am	5
(Germany) GetSpeed Performance	Mercedes-AMG GT3 Evo	Mercedes-AMG M159 6.2 L V8	286	(United States) Patrick Liddy	Am	5
(Germany) GetSpeed Performance	Mercedes-AMG GT3 Evo	Mercedes-AMG M159 6.2 L V8	286	(Germany) Adam Osieka	Am	5
(Germany) GetSpeed Performance	Mercedes-AMG GT3 Evo	Mercedes-AMG M159 6.2 L V8	286	(Ukraine) Yaroslav Veselaho	Am	5
SP4
(Slovakia) ARC Bratislava	Lamborghini Huracán GT3 Evo	Lamborghini DGF 5.2 L V10	4	(Slovakia) Miro Konôpka		2
(Slovakia) ARC Bratislava	Lamborghini Huracán GT3 Evo	Lamborghini DGF 5.2 L V10	4	(China) Liang Jiatong		2
(Slovakia) ARC Bratislava	Lamborghini Huracán GT3 Evo	Lamborghini DGF 5.2 L V10	4	(Slovakia) Adam Konôpka		2
(Slovakia) ARC Bratislava	Lamborghini Huracán GT3 Evo	Lamborghini DGF 5.2 L V10	4	(Poland) Andrzej Lewandowski		2
(Germany) Herberth Motorsport	Porsche 911 GT3 R (992.2)	Porsche M97/80 4.2 L Flat-6	91	(Germany) Ralf Bohn		2
(Germany) Herberth Motorsport	Porsche 911 GT3 R (992.2)	Porsche M97/80 4.2 L Flat-6	91	(Germany) Laurin Heinrich		2
(Germany) Herberth Motorsport	Porsche 911 GT3 R (992.2)	Porsche M97/80 4.2 L Flat-6	91	(Germany) Alfred Renauer		2
(Germany) Herberth Motorsport	Porsche 911 GT3 R (992.2)	Porsche M97/80 4.2 L Flat-6	91	(Germany) Robert Renauer		2
GTX
(Australia) 111 Racing	IRC GT	GM LS3 6.2 L V8	111	(Australia) Darren Currie		1–2
(Australia) 111 Racing	IRC GT	GM LS3 6.2 L V8	111	(Australia) Grant Donaldson		1
(Australia) 111 Racing	IRC GT	GM LS3 6.2 L V8	111	(Australia) Geoffrey Emery		2
(Australia) 111 Racing	IRC GT	GM LS3 6.2 L V8	111	(Australia) Daniel Studdard		2
(France) Vortex V8	Vortex 2.0	Chevrolet LS3 6.2 L V8	701	(France) Lionel Amrouche		All
(France) Vortex V8	Vortex 2.0	Chevrolet LS3 6.2 L V8	701	(France) Philippe Bonnel		All
(France) Vortex V8	Vortex 2.0	Chevrolet LS3 6.2 L V8	701	(France) Cyril Calmon		All
(France) Vortex V8	Vortex 2.0	Chevrolet LS3 6.2 L V8	701	(France) Gilles Courtois		5
(France) Vortex V8	Vortex 2.0	Chevrolet LS3 6.2 L V8	701	(France) Olivier Gomez		5
(France) Vortex V8	Vortex 2.0	Chevrolet LS3 6.2 L V8	702	(France) Arnoud Gomez		1
(France) Vortex V8	Vortex 2.0	Chevrolet LS3 6.2 L V8	702	(France) Olivier Gomez		1
(France) Vortex V8	Vortex 2.0	Chevrolet LS3 6.2 L V8	702	(France) Lionel Amrouche		2
(France) Vortex V8	Vortex 2.0	Chevrolet LS3 6.2 L V8	702	(France) Julien Boillot		2
(France) Vortex V8	Vortex 2.0	Chevrolet LS3 6.2 L V8	702	(France) Alexandre De Bernardinis		2
(France) Vortex V8	Vortex 2.0	Chevrolet LS3 6.2 L V8	702	(France) Solenn Amrouche		4
(France) Vortex V8	Vortex 2.0	Chevrolet LS3 6.2 L V8	702	(France) Philippe Burel		4
(France) Vortex V8	Vortex 2.0	Chevrolet LS3 6.2 L V8	702	(France) Franck Lefèvre		4
(France) Vortex V8	Vortex 2.0	Chevrolet LS3 6.2 L V8	703	(France) Arnoud Gomez		4
(France) Vortex V8	Vortex 2.0	Chevrolet LS3 6.2 L V8	703	(France) Olivier Gomez		4
(France) Vortex V8	Vortex 2.0	Chevrolet LS3 6.2 L V8	703	(France) Tom Pieri		4
(France) Vortex V8	Vortex 2.0	Chevrolet LS3 6.2 L V8	974	(France) Lionel Amrouche		5
(France) Vortex V8	Vortex 2.0	Chevrolet LS3 6.2 L V8	974	(France) Solenn Amrouche		5
(France) Vortex V8	Vortex 2.0	Chevrolet LS3 6.2 L V8	974	(France) Olivier Gomez		5
(France) Vortex V8	Vortex 2.0	Chevrolet LS3 6.2 L V8	974	(France) Yoann Olivar		5
(France) Vortex V8	Vortex 2.0	Chevrolet LS3 6.2 L V8	974	(France) Arnaud Tsamere		5
(Switzerland) Graff Racing	Nova NP02	Ford Coyote 5.0 L V8	709	(Switzerland) Sébastien Page		4
(Switzerland) Graff Racing	Nova NP02	Ford Coyote 5.0 L V8	709	(Switzerland) Luis Sanjuan		4
(Switzerland) Graff Racing	Nova NP02	Ford Coyote 5.0 L V8	709	(France) Eric Trouillet		4
992
(France) SebLajoux Racing	Porsche 992 GT3 Cup	Porsche 4.0 L Flat-6	888	(France) Sebastien Lajoux	Am	All
(France) SebLajoux Racing	Porsche 992 GT3 Cup	Porsche 4.0 L Flat-6	888	(Netherlands) Paul Meijer	Am	All
(France) SebLajoux Racing	Porsche 992 GT3 Cup	Porsche 4.0 L Flat-6	888	(France) Stéphane Perrin	Am	All
(France) SebLajoux Racing	Porsche 992 GT3 Cup	Porsche 4.0 L Flat-6	888	(Belgium) Nigel Bailly	Am	1
(France) SebLajoux Racing	Porsche 992 GT3 Cup	Porsche 4.0 L Flat-6	888	(Germany) Marlon Menden	Am	2
(France) SebLajoux Racing	Porsche 992 GT3 Cup	Porsche 4.0 L Flat-6	888	(France) Jeremy Faligand	Am	3
(France) SebLajoux Racing	Porsche 992 GT3 Cup	Porsche 4.0 L Flat-6	888	(Luxembourg) Carlos Rivas	Am	4
(France) SebLajoux Racing	Porsche 992 GT3 Cup	Porsche 4.0 L Flat-6	888	(Belgium) Mathieu Detry	Am	5
(France) SebLajoux Racing	Porsche 992 GT3 Cup	Porsche 4.0 L Flat-6	888	(Belgium) Fabian Duffieux	Am	5
(France) SebLajoux Racing	Porsche 992 GT3 Cup	Porsche 4.0 L Flat-6	910	(France) Jeremy Faligand	Am	4
(France) SebLajoux Racing	Porsche 992 GT3 Cup	Porsche 4.0 L Flat-6	910	(France) Jean-Laurent Navarro	Am	4
(France) SebLajoux Racing	Porsche 992 GT3 Cup	Porsche 4.0 L Flat-6	910	(France) Pierre Arnaud Navarro	Am	4
(France) SebLajoux Racing	Porsche 992 GT3 Cup	Porsche 4.0 L Flat-6	910	(Belgium) Giovanni Scamardi	Am	4
(India) Ajith Kumar Racing by BKR (Note: Car No. 901 entered as Ajith Kumar Racing by BKR in round 1 and entered as Ajith Kumar Racing by Red Ant in rounds 2–5.) (India) Ajith Kumar Racing by Red Ant	Porsche 992 GT3 Cup	Porsche 4.0 L Flat-6	901	(India) Ajith Kumar	Am	All
(India) Ajith Kumar Racing by BKR (India) Ajith Kumar Racing by Red Ant	Porsche 992 GT3 Cup	Porsche 4.0 L Flat-6	901	(Belgium) Mathieu Detry	Am	1–4
(India) Ajith Kumar Racing by BKR (India) Ajith Kumar Racing by Red Ant	Porsche 992 GT3 Cup	Porsche 4.0 L Flat-6	901	(Belgium) Fabian Duffieux	Am	1–4
(India) Ajith Kumar Racing by BKR (India) Ajith Kumar Racing by Red Ant	Porsche 992 GT3 Cup	Porsche 4.0 L Flat-6	901	(Netherlands) Huub van Eijndhoven	Am	5
(India) Ajith Kumar Racing by BKR (India) Ajith Kumar Racing by Red Ant	Porsche 992 GT3 Cup	Porsche 4.0 L Flat-6	901	(Australia) Cameron McLeod	Am	5
(India) Ajith Kumar Racing by BKR (India) Ajith Kumar Racing by Red Ant	Porsche 992 GT3 Cup	Porsche 4.0 L Flat-6	901	(Netherlands) Ralph Poppelaars	Am	5
(India) Ajith Kumar Racing by BKR (India) Ajith Kumar Racing by Red Ant	Porsche 992 GT3 Cup	Porsche 4.0 L Flat-6	901	(Belgium) Gregory Servais	Am	5
(Netherlands) Van Berlo Motorsport by Bas Koeten Racing	Porsche 992 GT3 Cup	Porsche 4.0 L Flat-6	925	(Netherlands) Glenn van Berlo	Am	2
(Netherlands) Van Berlo Motorsport by Bas Koeten Racing	Porsche 992 GT3 Cup	Porsche 4.0 L Flat-6	925	(Netherlands) Marcel van Berlo	Am	2
(Netherlands) Van Berlo Motorsport by Bas Koeten Racing	Porsche 992 GT3 Cup	Porsche 4.0 L Flat-6	925	(Netherlands) Bart van Helden	Am	2
(Netherlands) Van Berlo Motorsport by Bas Koeten Racing	Porsche 992 GT3 Cup	Porsche 4.0 L Flat-6	925	(Netherlands) Glenn van Berlo	P	3
(Netherlands) Van Berlo Motorsport by Bas Koeten Racing	Porsche 992 GT3 Cup	Porsche 4.0 L Flat-6	925	(Netherlands) Kay van Berlo	P	3
(Netherlands) Van Berlo Motorsport by Bas Koeten Racing	Porsche 992 GT3 Cup	Porsche 4.0 L Flat-6	925	(Netherlands) Marcel van Berlo	P	3
(Denmark) Holmgaard Motorsport	Porsche 992 GT3 Cup	Porsche 4.0 L Flat-6	902	(Denmark) Jonas Holmgaard	P	1–3
(Denmark) Holmgaard Motorsport	Porsche 992 GT3 Cup	Porsche 4.0 L Flat-6	902	(Denmark) Magnus Holmgaard	P	1–3
(Denmark) Holmgaard Motorsport	Porsche 992 GT3 Cup	Porsche 4.0 L Flat-6	902	(Denmark) Patrick Steen Rasmussen	P	1–3
(Denmark) Holmgaard Motorsport	Porsche 992 GT3 Cup	Porsche 4.0 L Flat-6	902	(Denmark) Martin Vedel Mortensen	P	1–3
(Denmark) Holmgaard Motorsport	Porsche 992 GT3 Cup	Porsche 4.0 L Flat-6	902	(Denmark) Marco Gersager	Am	4–5
(Denmark) Holmgaard Motorsport	Porsche 992 GT3 Cup	Porsche 4.0 L Flat-6	902	(Denmark) Jonas Holmgaard	Am	4–5
(Denmark) Holmgaard Motorsport	Porsche 992 GT3 Cup	Porsche 4.0 L Flat-6	902	(Denmark) Magnus Holmgaard	Am	4–5
(Denmark) Holmgaard Motorsport	Porsche 992 GT3 Cup	Porsche 4.0 L Flat-6	902	(Denmark) Patrick Steen Rasmussen	Am	4–5
(Denmark) Holmgaard Motorsport	Porsche 992 GT3 Cup	Porsche 4.0 L Flat-6	902	(Denmark) Martin Vedel Mortensen	Am	5
(Germany) RPM Racing	Porsche 992 GT3 Cup	Porsche 4.0 L Flat-6	907	(Germany) Philip Hamprecht	Am	All
(Germany) RPM Racing	Porsche 992 GT3 Cup	Porsche 4.0 L Flat-6	907	(Sweden) Niclas Jönsson	Am	All
(Germany) RPM Racing	Porsche 992 GT3 Cup	Porsche 4.0 L Flat-6	907	(United States) Tracy Krohn	Am	All
(Germany) RPM Racing	Porsche 992 GT3 Cup	Porsche 4.0 L Flat-6	907	(Netherlands) Patrick Huisman	Am	5
(Netherlands) Red Camel-Jordans.nl	Porsche 992 GT3 Cup	Porsche 4.0 L Flat-6	909	(Netherlands) Luc Breukers	P	All
(Netherlands) Red Camel-Jordans.nl	Porsche 992 GT3 Cup	Porsche 4.0 L Flat-6	909	(Netherlands) Rik Breukers	P	All
(Netherlands) Red Camel-Jordans.nl	Porsche 992 GT3 Cup	Porsche 4.0 L Flat-6	909	(Switzerland) Fabian Denz	P	All
(Netherlands) Red Camel-Jordans.nl	Porsche 992 GT3 Cup	Porsche 4.0 L Flat-6	909	(Netherlands) Ivo Breukers	P	2–5
(Germany) 9und11 Racing	Porsche 992 GT3 Cup	Porsche 4.0 L Flat-6	911	(Germany) Georg Goder	Am	2–4
(Germany) 9und11 Racing	Porsche 992 GT3 Cup	Porsche 4.0 L Flat-6	911	(Germany) Ralf Oehme	Am	2–4
(Germany) 9und11 Racing	Porsche 992 GT3 Cup	Porsche 4.0 L Flat-6	911	(Germany) Martin Schlüter	Am	2–4
(Germany) 9und11 Racing	Porsche 992 GT3 Cup	Porsche 4.0 L Flat-6	911	(Germany) Tim Scheerbarth	Am	2, 4
(Germany) 9und11 Racing	Porsche 992 GT3 Cup	Porsche 4.0 L Flat-6	911	(Germany) Moritz Oehme	Am	3
(Belgium) Mühlner Motorsport	Porsche 992 GT3 Cup	Porsche 4.0 L Flat-6	918	(Germany) Felipe Fernández Laser	P	2
(Belgium) Mühlner Motorsport	Porsche 992 GT3 Cup	Porsche 4.0 L Flat-6	918	(Germany) David Jahn	P	2
(Belgium) Mühlner Motorsport	Porsche 992 GT3 Cup	Porsche 4.0 L Flat-6	918	(Germany) Nick Salewsky	P	2
(Belgium) Mühlner Motorsport	Porsche 992 GT3 Cup	Porsche 4.0 L Flat-6	921	(Estonia) Martin Rump	P	All
(Belgium) Mühlner Motorsport	Porsche 992 GT3 Cup	Porsche 4.0 L Flat-6	921	(Latvia) Valters Zviedris	P	All
(Belgium) Mühlner Motorsport	Porsche 992 GT3 Cup	Porsche 4.0 L Flat-6	921	(Germany) Julian Hanses	P	1–2, 4–5
(Belgium) Mühlner Motorsport	Porsche 992 GT3 Cup	Porsche 4.0 L Flat-6	921	(El Salvador) Rolando Saca	P	3
(Belgium) Mühlner Motorsport	Porsche 992 GT3 Cup	Porsche 4.0 L Flat-6	921	(Netherlands) Paul Meijer	P	5
(Germany) HRT Performance	Porsche 992 GT3 Cup	Porsche 4.0 L Flat-6	928	Alexey Denisov	Am	1
(Germany) HRT Performance	Porsche 992 GT3 Cup	Porsche 4.0 L Flat-6	928	Sergey Titarenko	Am	1
(Germany) HRT Performance	Porsche 992 GT3 Cup	Porsche 4.0 L Flat-6	928	Victor Titarenko	Am	1
(Germany) HRT Performance	Porsche 992 GT3 Cup	Porsche 4.0 L Flat-6	928	(Qatar) Jassim Al-Thani	Am	4
(Germany) HRT Performance	Porsche 992 GT3 Cup	Porsche 4.0 L Flat-6	928	(Germany) Kim André Hauschild	Am	4
(Germany) HRT Performance	Porsche 992 GT3 Cup	Porsche 4.0 L Flat-6	928	(Switzerland) Silvain Pastoris	Am	4
(Germany) HRT Performance	Porsche 992 GT3 Cup	Porsche 4.0 L Flat-6	928	(Germany) Axel Sartingen	Am	4
(Germany) HRT Performance	Porsche 992 GT3 Cup	Porsche 4.0 L Flat-6	928	(United Kingdom) Steven Gambrell	Am	5
(Germany) HRT Performance	Porsche 992 GT3 Cup	Porsche 4.0 L Flat-6	928	(Republic of Ireland) Jonathan Kearney	Am	5
(Germany) HRT Performance	Porsche 992 GT3 Cup	Porsche 4.0 L Flat-6	928	(United Kingdom) James Kellett	Am	5
(Germany) HRT Performance	Porsche 992 GT3 Cup	Porsche 4.0 L Flat-6	928	(El Salvador) Rolando Saca	Am	5
(Germany) HRT Performance	Porsche 992 GT3 Cup	Porsche 4.0 L Flat-6	928	(United Arab Emirates) Igor Sorokin	Am	5
(France) GP Racing Team	Porsche 992 GT3 Cup	Porsche 4.0 L Flat-6	938	(France) Michael Blanchemain	Am	5
(France) GP Racing Team	Porsche 992 GT3 Cup	Porsche 4.0 L Flat-6	938	(France) Jérôme Da Costa	Am	5
(France) GP Racing Team	Porsche 992 GT3 Cup	Porsche 4.0 L Flat-6	938	(France) Cyril Saleilles	Am	5
(France) GP Racing Team	Porsche 992 GT3 Cup	Porsche 4.0 L Flat-6	938	(France) Loïc Teire	Am	5
(Spain) Escuderia Faraon	Porsche 992 GT3 Cup	Porsche 4.0 L Flat-6	949	(Spain) Pablo Bras Silvero	Am	1–3, 5
(Spain) Escuderia Faraon	Porsche 992 GT3 Cup	Porsche 4.0 L Flat-6	949	(Spain) Pedro Miguel Lourinho Bras	Am	1–3, 5
(Spain) Escuderia Faraon	Porsche 992 GT3 Cup	Porsche 4.0 L Flat-6	949	(Spain) Agustin Sanabria Crespo	Am	2, 5
(Spain) Escuderia Faraon	Porsche 992 GT3 Cup	Porsche 4.0 L Flat-6	949	(Spain) Fernando Gonzalez Gonzalez	Am	3, 5
(Spain) Escuderia Faraon	Porsche 992 GT3 Cup	Porsche 4.0 L Flat-6	949	(Spain) Francesc Gutierrez Agüi	Am	5
(Germany) Lionspeed GP	Porsche 992 GT3 Cup	Porsche 4.0 L Flat-6	957	(United States) José Garcia	P	4
(Germany) Lionspeed GP	Porsche 992 GT3 Cup	Porsche 4.0 L Flat-6	957	(Germany) Patrick Kolb	P	4
(Germany) Lionspeed GP	Porsche 992 GT3 Cup	Porsche 4.0 L Flat-6	957	(Switzerland) Patric Niederhauser	P	4
(Netherlands) MDM Motorsport	Porsche 992 GT3 Cup	Porsche 4.0 L Flat-6	965	(Netherlands) Tom Coronel	P	1
(Netherlands) MDM Motorsport	Porsche 992 GT3 Cup	Porsche 4.0 L Flat-6	965	(Netherlands) Hjelte Hoffner	P	1
(Netherlands) MDM Motorsport	Porsche 992 GT3 Cup	Porsche 4.0 L Flat-6	965	(Netherlands) Jan Jaap van Roon	P	1
(Italy) Ebimotors	Porsche 992 GT3 Cup	Porsche 4.0 L Flat-6	973	(Italy) Paolo Gnemmi	Am	1
(Italy) Ebimotors	Porsche 992 GT3 Cup	Porsche 4.0 L Flat-6	973	(Italy) Riccardo Pera	Am	1
(Italy) Ebimotors	Porsche 992 GT3 Cup	Porsche 4.0 L Flat-6	973	(Italy) Davide Roda	Am	1
(Italy) Ebimotors	Porsche 992 GT3 Cup	Porsche 4.0 L Flat-6	973	(Italy) Paolo Venerosi	Am	1
(Lithuania) Porsche Baltic	Porsche 992 GT3 Cup	Porsche 4.0 L Flat-6	992	(Lithuania) Robertas Kupcikas	Am	1
(Lithuania) Porsche Baltic	Porsche 992 GT3 Cup	Porsche 4.0 L Flat-6	992	(Lithuania) Audrius Piktys	Am	1
(Lithuania) Porsche Baltic	Porsche 992 GT3 Cup	Porsche 4.0 L Flat-6	992	(Lithuania) Tautvydas Rudokas	Am	1
GT4
(Germany) CCS Racing	Porsche 718 Cayman GT4 RS Clubsport	Porsche MDG 4.0 L Flat-6	410	(Germany) Jim Gebhardt		1
(Germany) CCS Racing	Porsche 718 Cayman GT4 RS Clubsport	Porsche MDG 4.0 L Flat-6	410	(Germany) Nikolas Gebhardt		1
(Belgium) Hamofa Motorsport	BMW M4 GT4 Evo (G82)	BMW S58B30T0 3.0 L Twin-Turbo I6	419	(Belgium) Kris Verhoeven		2, 4
(Belgium) Hamofa Motorsport	BMW M4 GT4 Evo (G82)	BMW S58B30T0 3.0 L Twin-Turbo I6	419	(Belgium) Mark Verhoeven		2, 4
(Belgium) Hamofa Motorsport	BMW M4 GT4 Evo (G82)	BMW S58B30T0 3.0 L Twin-Turbo I6	419	(Belgium) Rob Verhoeven		2, 4
(United Kingdom) Venture Engineering	Mercedes-AMG GT4	Mercedes-AMG M178 4.0 L V8	421	(United Kingdom) Matt George		All
(United Kingdom) Venture Engineering	Mercedes-AMG GT4	Mercedes-AMG M178 4.0 L V8	421	(United Kingdom) Christopher Jones		All
(United Kingdom) Venture Engineering	Mercedes-AMG GT4	Mercedes-AMG M178 4.0 L V8	421	(United Kingdom) Neville Jones		All
(United Kingdom) Venture Engineering	Mercedes-AMG GT4	Mercedes-AMG M178 4.0 L V8	421	(United Kingdom) Matthew Higgins		1–2
(United Kingdom) Venture Engineering	Mercedes-AMG GT4	Mercedes-AMG M178 4.0 L V8	421	(United Kingdom) Owen Hizzey		5
(Italy) Lotus PB Racing	Lotus Emira GT4	Lotus 2GR-FE 3.6 L V6	426	(Italy) Massimo Abbati		1
(Italy) Lotus PB Racing	Lotus Emira GT4	Lotus 2GR-FE 3.6 L V6	426	(Italy) Stefano d'Aste		1
(Italy) Lotus PB Racing	Lotus Emira GT4	Lotus 2GR-FE 3.6 L V6	426	(Italy) Alberto Naska		1
(Italy) Lotus PB Racing	Lotus Emira GT4	Lotus 2GR-FE 3.6 L V6	426	(Italy) Massimiliano Schiavone		1
(Germany) SRS Team Sorg Rennsport	Porsche 718 Cayman GT4 RS Clubsport	Porsche MDG 4.0 L Flat-6	427	(France) Thierry Chkondali		2, 5
(Germany) SRS Team Sorg Rennsport	Porsche 718 Cayman GT4 RS Clubsport	Porsche MDG 4.0 L Flat-6	427	(France) Marc Girard		2, 5
(Germany) SRS Team Sorg Rennsport	Porsche 718 Cayman GT4 RS Clubsport	Porsche MDG 4.0 L Flat-6	427	(Canada) Michel Sallenbach		2, 5
(Germany) SRS Team Sorg Rennsport	Porsche 718 Cayman GT4 RS Clubsport	Porsche MDG 4.0 L Flat-6	427	(France) Jordan Mougenot		5
(Germany) SRS Team Sorg Rennsport	Porsche 718 Cayman GT4 RS Clubsport	Porsche MDG 4.0 L Flat-6	427	(Canada) Damon Surzyshyn		5
(Germany) SRS Team Sorg Rennsport	Porsche 718 Cayman GT4 RS Clubsport	Porsche MDG 4.0 L Flat-6	452	(United Kingdom) Harley Haughton		2
(Germany) SRS Team Sorg Rennsport	Porsche 718 Cayman GT4 RS Clubsport	Porsche MDG 4.0 L Flat-6	452	(Germany) Maximilian Hill		2
(Germany) SRS Team Sorg Rennsport	Porsche 718 Cayman GT4 RS Clubsport	Porsche MDG 4.0 L Flat-6	452	(New Zealand) Guy Stewart		2
(Germany) SRS Team Sorg Rennsport	Porsche 718 Cayman GT4 RS Clubsport	Porsche MDG 4.0 L Flat-6	452	(Mexico) Benito Tagle		2
(Spain) NM Racing	Mercedes-AMG GT4	Mercedes-AMG M178 4.0 L V8	488	(Spain) Manel Lao Cornago		5
(Spain) NM Racing	Mercedes-AMG GT4	Mercedes-AMG M178 4.0 L V8	488	(United States) Keith Gatehouse		5
(Spain) NM Racing	Mercedes-AMG GT4	Mercedes-AMG M178 4.0 L V8	488	(United Kingdom) Branden Lee Oxley		5
(Spain) NM Racing	Mercedes-AMG GT4	Mercedes-AMG M178 4.0 L V8	488	(Spain) Jorge Belloc Ruiz		5
TCX
(Germany) asBest Racing	Cupra TCR DSG	Volkswagen EA888 2.0 L I4	102	(Germany) Pia Ohlsson		2, 5
(Germany) asBest Racing	Cupra TCR DSG	Volkswagen EA888 2.0 L I4	102	(Japan) Junichi Umemoto		2, 5
(Germany) asBest Racing	Cupra TCR DSG	Volkswagen EA888 2.0 L I4	102	(Germany) Christian Ladurner		2
(Germany) asBest Racing	Cupra TCR DSG	Volkswagen EA888 2.0 L I4	102	(Poland) Rafal Gieras		5
(Germany) asBest Racing	Cupra TCR DSG	Volkswagen EA888 2.0 L I4	102	(Germany) Sebastian Schemmann		5
(Germany) asBest Racing	Porsche 718 Cayman GT4 CS (982)	Porsche 3.8 L Flat-6	111	(United States) Seth Brown		5
(Germany) asBest Racing	Porsche 718 Cayman GT4 CS (982)	Porsche 3.8 L Flat-6	111	(Denmark) Conrad Tox Leveau		5
(Germany) asBest Racing	Porsche 718 Cayman GT4 CS (982)	Porsche 3.8 L Flat-6	111	(Germany) Desirée Müller		5
(Germany) asBest Racing	Porsche 718 Cayman GT4 CS (982)	Porsche 3.8 L Flat-6	111	(Belgium) Steven Teirlinck		5
(United States) THRW Honda Racing	Honda Civic Type-R (FL5)	Honda K20C1 2.0 L Turbo I4	123	(United States) Derek Ferretti		5
(United States) THRW Honda Racing	Honda Civic Type-R (FL5)	Honda K20C1 2.0 L Turbo I4	123	(United States) Christian Hernandez		5
(United States) THRW Honda Racing	Honda Civic Type-R (FL5)	Honda K20C1 2.0 L Turbo I4	123	(United States) Corey Taguchi		5
(United States) THRW Honda Racing	Honda Civic Type-R (FL5)	Honda K20C1 2.0 L Turbo I4	123	(United States) Weston Walter		5
(United States) THRW Honda Racing	Honda Civic Type-R (FL5)	Honda K20C1 2.0 L Turbo I4	124	(Canada) Todd Chiappino		5
(United States) THRW Honda Racing	Honda Civic Type-R (FL5)	Honda K20C1 2.0 L Turbo I4	124	(Canada) Lawrence Hwang		5
(United States) THRW Honda Racing	Honda Civic Type-R (FL5)	Honda K20C1 2.0 L Turbo I4	124	(United States) Jeremy Lucas		5
(United States) THRW Honda Racing	Honda Civic Type-R (FL5)	Honda K20C1 2.0 L Turbo I4	124	(Canada) Scott Nicol		5
(United Kingdom) J-Mec Engineering	BMW M3 E46	BMW 3.0 L I4	133	(United Kingdom) Kevin Clarke		2, 5
(United Kingdom) J-Mec Engineering	BMW M3 E46	BMW 3.0 L I4	133	(United Kingdom) James Collins		2, 5
(United Kingdom) J-Mec Engineering	BMW M3 E46	BMW 3.0 L I4	133	(United Kingdom) Oliver Smith		5
(United Kingdom) J-Mec Engineering	BMW M3 E46	BMW 3.0 L I4	133	(United Kingdom) Steve Cheetham		5

GT3 entries
Icon	Class
P	GT3-Pro
PA	GT3-Pro Am
Am	GT3-Am
992 entries
Icon	Class
P	992-Pro
Am	992-Am

== Race results ==
Bold indicates overall winner.

Event	Circuit	GT3-Pro Winners	GT3-Pro/Am Winners	GT3-Am Winners	GTX Winners	992-Pro Winners	992-Am Winners	GT4 Winners	TCX Winners	Report
1	(Italy) Mugello	(Belgium) No. 93 Red Ant Racing	**(Italy) No. 95 Manamauri Energy by Ebimotors**	(United States) No. 27 Heart of Racing by SPS	(France) No. 702 Vortex V8	(Netherlands) No. 909 Red Camel-Jordans.nl	(Germany) No. 907 RPM Racing	(United Kingdom) No. 421 Venture	No entries	Report
1	(Italy) Mugello	(Belgium) Kobe de Breucker (Germany) Kenneth Hayer (Belgium) Ayrton Redant (Belgium) Yannick Redant	**(Italy) Fabrizio Broggi** **(Italy) Sabino de Castro** **(Romania) Sergiu Nicolae**	(United States) Hannah Grisham (United Kingdom) Ian James (United States) Gray Newell	(France) Arnaud Gomez (France) Olivier Gomez	(Netherlands) Luc Breukers (Netherlands) Rik Breukers (Switzerland) Fabian Denz	(Germany) Philip Hamprecht (Sweden) Niclas Jönsson (United States) Tracy Krohn	(United Kingdom) Matthew George (United Kingdom) Matthew Higgins (United Kingdom) Christopher Jones (United Kingdom) Neville Jones	No entries	Report
2	(Belgium) Spa	**(Germany) No. 193 Ziggo Sport - Tempesta Racing**	(Czech Republic) No. 56 Scuderia Praha	(Switzerland) No. 11 Hofor Racing	(France) No. 701 Vortex V8	(Netherlands) No. 909 Red Camel-Jordans.nl	(Germany) No. 907 RPM Racing	(Germany) No. 427 SRS Team Sorg Rennsport	(United Kingdom) No. 133 J-Mec Engineering	Report
2	(Belgium) Spa	**(United Kingdom) Chris Froggatt** **(Netherlands) Loek Hartog** **(Hong Kong) Jonathan Hui**	(Czech Republic) Josef Král (Slovakia) Matúš Výboh (Slovakia) Miroslav Výboh (Czech Republic) Dennis Waszek	(Switzerland) Michael Kroll (Germany) Alexander Prinz (Switzerland) Chantal Prinz (Germany) Torsten Kratz	(France) Lionel Amrouche (France) Philippe Bonnel (France) Cyril Calmon	(Netherlands) Luc Breukers (Netherlands) Rik Breukers (Switzerland) Fabian Denz (Netherlands) Ivo Breukers	(Germany) Philip Hamprecht (Sweden) Niclas Jönsson (United States) Tracy Krohn	(France) Thierry Chkondali (France) Marc Girard (Canada) Michel Sallenbach	(United Kingdom) Kevin Clarke (United Kingdom) James Collins	Report
3	(Italy) Misano	(Belgium) No. 93 Red Ant Racing	(Germany) No. 73 Proton Huber Competition	**(Antigua and Barbuda) No. 21 HAAS RT**	(France) No. 701 Vortex V8	(Netherlands) No. 925 Van Berlo Motorsport by Bas Koeten Racing	(Germany) No. 907 RPM Racing	(United Kingdom) No. 421 Venture	No entries	Report
3	(Italy) Misano	(Belgium) Kobe de Breucker (Germany) Kenneth Hayer (Belgium) Ayrton Redant (Belgium) Yannick Redant	(Austria) Klaus Bachler (Germany) Jörg Dreisow (Germany) Manuel Lauck (Germany) Constantin Dressler	**(Belgium) Peter Guelinckx** **(Belgium) Jef Machiels** **(Belgium) Matisse Lismont**	(France) Lionel Amrouche (France) Philippe Bonnel (France) Cyril Calmon	(Netherlands) Glenn van Berlo (Netherlands) Marcel van Berlo (Netherlands) Kay van Berlo	(Germany) Philip Hamprecht (Sweden) Niclas Jönsson (United States) Tracy Krohn	(United Kingdom) Matthew George (United Kingdom) Christopher Jones (United Kingdom) Neville Jones	No entries	Report
4	(France) Paul Ricard	(Belgium) No. 93 Red Ant Racing	**(Germany) No. 73 Proton Huber Competition**	(United Kingdom) No. 69 Continental Racing by Simpson Motorsport	(Switzerland) No. 709 Graff Racing	(Belgium) No. 921 Mühlner Motorsport	(Denmark) No. 902 Holmgaard Motorsport	(United Kingdom) No. 421 Venture	No entries	Report
4	(France) Paul Ricard	(Belgium) Kobe de Breucker (Germany) Kenneth Hayer (Belgium) Ayrton Redant (Belgium) Yannick Redant	**(Austria) Klaus Bachler** **(Germany) Jörg Dreisow** **(Germany) Manuel Lauck** **(Germany) Mark Wallenwein**	David Pogosyan (Kyrgyzstan) Andrey Solukovtsev (Cyprus) Vasily Vladykin	(Switzerland) Sébastien Page (Switzerland) Luis Sanjuan (France) Eric Trouillet	(Germany) Julian Hanses (Estonia) Martin Rump (Latvia) Valters Zviedris	(Denmark) Marco Gersager (Denmark) Jonas Holmgaard (Denmark) Magnus Holmgaard (Denmark) Patrick Steen Rasmussen	(United Kingdom) Matthew George (United Kingdom) Christopher Jones (United Kingdom) Neville Jones	No entries	Report
5	(Spain) Barcelona	(Antigua and Barbuda) No. 21 HAAS RT	(Germany) No. 73 Proton Huber Competition	**(Switzerland) No. 11 Hofor Racing**	(France) No. 701 Vortex V8	(Belgium) No. 921 Mühlner Motorsport	(Germany) No. 928 HRT Performance	(United Kingdom) No. 421 Venture	(Germany) No. 102 asBest Racing	Report
5	(Spain) Barcelona	(Canada) Ramez Azzam (Belgium) Peter Guelinckx (Belgium) Matisse Lismont (Belgium) Jef Machiels	(Austria) Klaus Bachler (Germany) Jörg Dreisow (Germany) Constantin Dressler (Germany) Manuel Lauck	**(Germany) Torsten Kratz** **(Switzerland) Michael Kroll** **(Germany) Alexander Prinz** **(Switzerland) Chantal Prinz**	(France) Lionel Amrouche (France) Philippe Bonnel (France) Cyril Calmon (France) Gilles Courtois (France) Olivier Gomez	(Germany) Julian Hanses (Netherlands) Paul Meijer (Estonia) Martin Rump (Latvia) Valters Zviedris	(United Kingdom) Steven Gambrell (Republic of Ireland) Jonathan Kearney (United Kingdom) James Kellett (El Salvador) Rolando Saca (United Arab Emirates) Igor Sorokin	(United Kingdom) Matthew George (United Kingdom) Christopher Jones (United Kingdom) Neville Jones (United Kingdom) Owen Hizzey	(Poland) Rafal Gieras (Germany) Pia Ohlsson (Germany) Sebastian Schemmann (Japan) Junichi Umemoto	Report

== Championship standings ==
=== Points system ===
Championship points are awarded in each class at the finish of each event. Points are awarded based on finishing positions in qualifying and the race as shown in the chart below. Drivers and teams who compete in all races have the lowest finish dropped from the final points standings.

==== Point allocation for races of 24 hours ====
Position	Time	**1st**	**2nd**	**3rd**	**4th**	**5th**	**6th**	**7th**	**8th**	**9th**	**10th**	**11th**	**12th**	**13th**	**14th**	**15th**
Points	24 Hours	40	36	32	28	24	20	18	16	14	12	10	8	6	4	2
Points	12 Hours	20	18	16	14	12	10	9	8	7	6	5	4	3	2	1

==== Point allocation for races from 10 to 24 hours ====
Position	**1st**	**2nd**	**3rd**	**4th**	**5th**	**6th**	**7th**	**8th**	**9th**	**10th**	**11th**	**12th**	**13th**	**14th**	**15th**
Points	40	36	32	28	24	20	18	16	14	12	10	8	6	4	2

=== GT3 Drivers' Championship ===
Pos.	Drivers	Team	(Italy) MUG	(Belgium) SPA	(Italy) MIS	(France) LEC	(Spain) BAR		Pts.
Pos.	Drivers	Team	(Italy) MUG	(Belgium) SPA	(Italy) MIS	(France) LEC	12H	24H	Pts.
1	(Austria) Klaus Bachler (Germany) Jörg Dreisow (Germany) Manuel Lauck	(Germany) Proton Huber Competition	(13)	6	**2**	1	2	4	142
2	(Switzerland) Michael Kroll (Germany) Alexander Prinz (Switzerland) Chantal Prinz	(Switzerland) HOFOR Racing	11	**2**	6	16†	6	1	116
3	(Lithuania) Arunas Geciauskas (Italy) Nicola Michelon	(Lithuania) Juta Racing	8	5	4	(10)	4	3	114
4	(Germany) Constantin Dressler	(Germany) Proton Huber Competition		6	**2**		2	4	102
4	(Germany) Constantin Dressler	(Switzerland) Kessel Racing		9					102
5	(Kyrgyzstan) Andrey Solukovtsev (Cyprus) Vasily Vladykin	(United Kingdom) Continental Racing by Simpson Motorsport	7	(12†)	8	4	1	7	100
6	(Czech Republic) Josef Král (Czech Republic) Miroslav Výboh	(Czech Republic) Scuderia Praha	(9)	3	5	5	10	10	98
6	(Belgium) Peter Guelinckx	(Antigua and Barbuda) HAAS RT			1	13	3	2	98
6	(Czech Republic) Dennis Waszek	(Czech Republic) Scuderia Praha		3	5	5	10	10	98
7	(Belgium) Kobe de Breucker (Germany) Kenneth Hayer (Belgium) Ayrton Redant (Belgium) Yannick Redant	(Belgium) Red Ant Racing	5	14†	3	2	Ret	Ret	96
8	(United States) Dwight Merriman (United States) Ryan Dalziel	(United States) Era Motorsport	3	10	7	6	9	8	93
9	(Czech Republic) Matúš Výboh	(Czech Republic) Scuderia Praha	9	3	5		10	10	88
10	(United Kingdom) Jake Hill	(United States) Era Motorsport	3	10		6	9	8	87
11	(Germany) Torsten Kratz	(Switzerland) HOFOR Racing		**2**		16†	6	1	86
12	(United States) Kyle Tilley	(United States) Era Motorsport	3	10	7		9	8	85
13	(Germany) Maximilian Partl	(Switzerland) HOFOR Racing	11		6	16†	6	1	80
13	(Switzerland) Tim Müller	(Lithuania) Juta Racing	8	5	4	10			80
14	(Malaysia) Dominic Ang (Malaysia) Douglas Khoo (Malaysia) Melvin Moh	(Malaysia) Viper Niza Racing		4	9	8	13	11	71
15	David Pogosyan	(United Kingdom) Continental Racing by Simpson Motorsport	7	12†	8	4			70
16	(Spain) Pablo Burguera (Spain) Oliver Campos (Spain) Antonio Sainero	(Spain) E2P Racing	Ret	11†	Ret	7	11	9	47
drivers ineligible for final championship positions
	(Belgium) Matisse Lismont	(Antigua and Barbuda) HAAS RT			1		3	2	
	(Belgium) Jef Machiels	(Antigua and Barbuda) HAAS RT			1	13			
	(Netherlands) Loek Hartog	(Germany) Ziggo Sport - Tempesta Racing		1					
	(Netherlands) Loek Hartog	(Belgium) Red Ant Racing					Ret	Ret	
	(Italy) Fabrizio Broggi (Italy) Sabino de Castro (Romania) Sergiu Nicolae	(Italy) Manamauri Energy by Ebimotors	1						
	(United Kingdom) Chris Froggatt (Hong Kong) Jonathan Hui	(Germany) Ziggo Sport - Tempesta Racing		1					
	(Germany) Mark Wallenwein	(Germany) Proton Huber Competition				1			
	(Canada) Ramez Azzam	(United Arab Emirates) Into Africa Racing by Dragon				**12**			
	(Canada) Ramez Azzam	(Antigua and Barbuda) HAAS RT					3	2	
	(Belgium) Nicolas Guelinckx	(Antigua and Barbuda) HAAS RT				13	3	2	
	(United States) Hannah Grisham (United Kingdom) Ian James (United States) Gray Newell	(United States) Heart of Racing by SPS	2						
	(France) Jordan Boisson (France) Patrick Charlaix (Belgium) Benjamin Paque	(France) TFT Racing				3	5	**6**	
	(Germany) Nico Bastian	(France) TFT Racing				3			
	(United Kingdom) Gavin Pickering (United Kingdom) Lars Viljoen (China) Zhang Yaqi	(Lithuania) Juta Racing					4	3	
	(Italy) Alessandro Cutrera (Italy) Leonardo-Maria del Vecchio (Italy) Marco Frezza (Italy) David Fumanelli	(Switzerland) Kessel Racing	**4**						
	(Austria) Michael Doppelmayr (Germany) Elia Erhart (Switzerland) Ernst Inderbitzin (Germany) Pierre Kaffer	(France) Saintéloc Junior Team				9†	7	5	
	(France) Stephane Tribaudini	(France) Saintéloc Junior Team					7	5	
	(Slovakia) Miro Konôpka (China) Liang Jiatong	(Slovakia) ARC Bratislava	6	Ret					
	(Slovakia) Zdeno Mikulasko (Austria) Gerhard Tweraser	(Slovakia) ARC Bratislava	6						
	(Greece) Andreas Laskaratos	(United States) Era Motorsport				6			
	(Germany) Maro Engel	(France) TFT Racing					5	**6**	
	(United States) Lisa Clark (Canada) Kyle Marcelli (Italy) Felice Jelmini	(Italy) Pellin Racing	12	7					
	(Belgium) Nico Verdonck	(United States) Era Motorsport			7				
	(Germany) Alex Aka (United Kingdom) Sacha Kakad; Maksim Kizilov	(United Kingdom) Continental Racing by Simpson Motorsport					1	7	
	(United Kingdom) Tom Jackson (Zimbabwe) Ameerh Naran	(Antigua and Barbuda) HAAS RT		8					
	(United Kingdom) Tom Jackson (Zimbabwe) Ameerh Naran	(Lithuania) Juta Racing			11				
	(United Kingdom) Oliver Bryant	(United States) Era Motorsport					9	8	
	(United Kingdom) Matt Bell (United States) Dustin Blattner (United States) Blake McDonald	(Switzerland) Kessel Racing		9					
	(France) Philippe Chatelet	(France) Saintéloc Junior Team				9†			
	(Spain) Javier Morcillo	(Spain) E2P Racing					11	9	
	(Italy) Corinna Gostner (Italy) David Gostner (Italy) Manuela Gostner (Italy) Thomas Gostner	(Italy) MP Racing	10						
	(New Zealand) Francois Beziac	(Lithuania) Juta Racing				11			
	(Malaysia) Mohammed Afiq Ikhwan (Malaysia) Aaron Lim	(Malaysia) Viper Niza Racing					13	11	
	(Zimbabwe) Axcil Jefferies (South Africa) Xollie Letlaka	(United Arab Emirates) Into Africa Racing by Dragon				**12**	12	Ret	
	(Kuwait) Khaled Al Marzouq	(United Arab Emirates) Into Africa Racing by Dragon				**12**			
	(United States) Jon Hirshberg (Australia) Andres Latorre (United States) Patrick Liddy (Germany) Adam Osieka (Ukraine) Yaroslav Veselaho	(Germany) GetSpeed Performance					8	12†	
	(Netherlands) Laura van den Hengel	(Germany) Proton Huber Competition	13						
	(Belgium) Olivier Bertels (Belgium) Xavier Knauf (Belgium) Gregory Servais	(Antigua and Barbuda) HAAS RT		13					
	(Lithuania) Audrius Butkevicius (Lithuania) Vaidas Miciuda (Lithuania) Paulius Paskevicius (Lithuania) Paulius Ruskys	(Lithuania) RD Signs - Siauliai Racing Team				14			
	(Australia) Nick Foster (New Zealand) Jono Lester (New Zealand) Heremana Malmezac (Finland) Miika Panu	(New Zealand) Prime Speed Sport				15†			
	(United States) Thor Haugen (Italy) Paolo Ruberti	(Italy) Pellin Racing	DNS	Ret					
	(Slovakia) Adam Konôpka (Poland) Andrzej Lewandowski	(Slovakia) ARC Bratislava		Ret					
	(South Africa) Arnold Neveling (South Africa) Stuart White	(United Arab Emirates) Into Africa Racing by Dragon					12	Ret	
Pos.	Drivers	Team	(Italy) MUG	(Belgium) SPA	(Italy) MIS	(France) LEC	12H	24H	Pts.
Pos.	Drivers	Team	(Italy) MUG	(Belgium) SPA	(Italy) MIS	(France) LEC	(Spain) BAR		Pts.

Colour	Result
Gold	Winner
Silver	Second place
Bronze	Third place
Green	Points classification
Blue	Non-points classification
Blue	Non-classified finish (NC)
Purple	Retired, not classified (Ret)
Red	Did not qualify (DNQ)
Red	Did not pre-qualify (DNPQ)
Black	Disqualified (DSQ)
White	Did not start (DNS)
White	Withdrew (WD)
White	Race cancelled (C)
Blank	Did not practice (DNP)
Blank	Did not arrive (DNA)
Blank	Excluded (EX)

**Bold** – Pole
Italics – Fastest Lap

† – Drivers did not finish the race, but were classified as they completed over 60% of the class winner's race distance.

=== GT3 Teams' Championship ===
Pos.	Teams	(Italy) MUG	(Belgium) SPA	(Italy) MIS	(France) LEC	(Spain) BAR		Pts.
Pos.	Teams	(Italy) MUG	(Belgium) SPA	(Italy) MIS	(France) LEC	12H	24H	Pts.
1	(Germany) No. 73 Proton Huber Competition	(13)	6	**2**	1	2	4	142
2	(Switzerland) No. 11 Hofor Racing	11	**2**	6	(Ret)	6	1	116
3	(Lithuania) No. 71 Juta Racing	8	5	4	(10)	4	3	114
4	(Antigua and Barbuda) No. 21 HAAS RT		13	1	13	3	2	104
5	(United Kingdom) No. 69 Continental Racing by Simpson Motorsport	7	(12†)	8	4	1	7	100
6	(Czech Republic) No. 56 Scuderia Praha	(9)	3	5	5	10	10	98
7	(Belgium) No. 93 Red Ant Racing	5	14†	3	2	(Ret)	(Ret)	96
8	(United States) No. 81 Era Motorsport	3	(10)	7	6	9	8	93
9	(Malaysia) No. 65 Viper Niza Racing		4	9	8	13	6	71
10	(Spain) No. 90 E2P Racing	(Ret)	11†	Ret	7	11	4	47
Guest teams ineligible to score points
–	(Antigua and Barbuda) No. 2 HAAS RT		8					–
–	(Switzerland) No. 8 Kessel Racing	**4**	9					–
–	(France) No. 18 Saintéloc Junior Team				9	7	5	–
–	(Italy) No. 23 Pellin Racing	DNS	Ret					–
–	(United States) No. 27 Heart of Racing by SPS	2						–
–	(France) No. 28 TFT Racing				3	**5**	11	–
–	(Italy) No. 29 Pellin Racing	12	7					–
–	(New Zealand) No. 42 Prime Speed Sport				15			–
–	(Slovakia) No. 44 ARC Bratislava	6	Ret					–
–	(Italy) No. 58 MP Racing	10						–
–	(Lithuania) No. 72 Juta Racing				11			–
–	(Italy) No. 95 Manamauri Energy by Ebimotors	1						–
–	(Lithuania) No. 96 RD Signs - Siauliai Racing Team				14			–
–	(United Arab Emirates) No. 98 Into Africa Racing by Dragon				**12**	12	Ret	–
–	(Germany) No. 193 Ziggo Sport - Tempesta Racing		1					–
–	(Germany) No. 286 GetSpeed					8	12	–
Pos.	Team	(Italy) MUG	(Belgium) SPA	(Italy) MIS	(France) LEC	12H	24H	Pts.
Pos.	Team	(Italy) MUG	(Belgium) SPA	(Italy) MIS	(France) LEC	(Spain) BAR		Pts.

Colour	Result
Gold	Winner
Silver	Second place
Bronze	Third place
Green	Points classification
Blue	Non-points classification
Blue	Non-classified finish (NC)
Purple	Retired, not classified (Ret)
Red	Did not qualify (DNQ)
Red	Did not pre-qualify (DNPQ)
Black	Disqualified (DSQ)
White	Did not start (DNS)
White	Withdrew (WD)
White	Race cancelled (C)
Blank	Did not practice (DNP)
Blank	Did not arrive (DNA)
Blank	Excluded (EX)

**Bold** – Pole
Italics – Fastest Lap

† – Drivers did not finish the race, but were classified as they completed over 60% of the class winner's race distance.

=== GT3 Pro-Am Drivers' Championship ===
Pos.	Drivers	Team	(Italy) MUG	(Belgium) SPA	(Italy) MIS	(France) LEC	(Spain) BAR		Pts.
Pos.	Drivers	Team	(Italy) MUG	(Belgium) SPA	(Italy) MIS	(France) LEC	12H	24H	Pts.
1	(Austria) Klaus Bachler (Germany) Jörg Dreisow (Germany) Manuel Lauck	(Germany) Proton Huber Competition	5	2	**1**	1			140
2	(Czech Republic) Josef Král (Czech Republic) MiroslavVýboh	(Czech Republic) Scuderia Praha	4	**1**	2	3			136
3	(United States) Dwight Merriman (United States) Ryan Dalziel	(United States) Era Motorsport	2	4	3	4			124
4	(Czech Republic) Dennis Waszek	(Czech Republic) Scuderia Praha		**1**	2	3			108
5	(Czech Republic) Matúš Výboh	(Czech Republic) Scuderia Praha	4	**1**	2				104
6	(United States) Kyle Tilley	(United States) Era Motorsport	2	4	3				96
7	(United Kingdom) Jake Hill	(United States) Era Motorsport	2	4		4			92
8	(Germany) Constantin Dressler	(Germany) Proton Huber Competition		2	**1**				76
8	(Germany) Constantin Dressler	(Switzerland) Kessel Racing		3					76
9	(Italy) Fabrizio Broggi (Italy) Sabino de Castro (Romania) Sergiu Nicolae	(Italy) Manamauri Energy by Ebimotors	1						40
9	(Germany) Mark Wallenwein	(Germany) Proton Huber Competition				1			40
10	(Germany) Nico Bastian (France) Jordan Boisson (France) Patrick Charlaix (Belgium) Benjamin Paque	(France) TFT Racing				2			36
11	(Italy) Alessandro Cutrera (Italy) Leonardo-Maria del Vecchio (Italy) Marco Frezza (Italy) David Fumanelli	(Switzerland) Kessel Racing	**3**						32
11	(United Kingdom) Matt Bell (United States) Dustin Blattner (United States) Blake McDonald	(Switzerland) Kessel Racing		3					32
11	(Belgium) Nico Verdonck	(United States) Era Motorsport			3				32
12	(Greece) Andreas Laskaratos	(United States) Era Motorsport				4			28
13	(Netherlands) Laura van den Hengel	(Germany) Proton Huber Competition	5						24
13	(France) Philippe Chatelet (Austria) Michael Doppelmayr (Germany) Elia Erhart (Switzerland) Ernst Inderbitzin (Germany) Pierre Kaffer	(France) Saintéloc Junior Team				5†			24
14	(Kuwait) Khaled Al Marzouq (Canada) Ramez Azzam (Zimbabwe) Axcil Jefferies (South Africa) Xollie Letlaka	(United Arab Emirates) Into Africa Racing by Dragon				**6**			20
15	(Australia) Nick Foster (New Zealand) Jono Lester (New Zealand) Heremana Malmezac (Finland) Miika Panu	(New Zealand) Prime Speed Sport				7†			18
Pos.	Drivers	Team	(Italy) MUG	(Belgium) SPA	(Italy) MIS	(France) LEC	12H	24H	Pts.
Pos.	Drivers	Team	(Italy) MUG	(Belgium) SPA	(Italy) MIS	(France) LEC	(Spain) BAR		Pts.

Colour	Result
Gold	Winner
Silver	Second place
Bronze	Third place
Green	Points classification
Blue	Non-points classification
Blue	Non-classified finish (NC)
Purple	Retired, not classified (Ret)
Red	Did not qualify (DNQ)
Red	Did not pre-qualify (DNPQ)
Black	Disqualified (DSQ)
White	Did not start (DNS)
White	Withdrew (WD)
White	Race cancelled (C)
Blank	Did not practice (DNP)
Blank	Did not arrive (DNA)
Blank	Excluded (EX)

**Bold** – Pole
Italics – Fastest Lap

† – Drivers did not finish the race, but were classified as they completed over 60% of the class winner's race distance.

=== GT3 Pro-Am Teams' Championship ===
Pos.	Team	(Italy) MUG	(Belgium) SPA	(Italy) MIS	(France) LEC	(Spain) BAR		Pts.
Pos.	Team	(Italy) MUG	(Belgium) SPA	(Italy) MIS	(France) LEC	12H	24H	Pts.
1	(Germany) No. 73 Proton Huber Competition	5	2	**1**	1			140
2	(Czech Republic) No. 56 Scuderia Praha	4	**1**	2	3			136
3	(United States) No. 81 Era Motorsport	2	4	3	4			124
4	(Switzerland) No. 8 CCC Kessel Racing	**3**	3					64
5	(Italy) No. 95 Manamauri Energy by Ebimotors	1						40
6	(France) No. 28 TFT Racing				2			36
7	(France) No. 18 Saintéloc Junior Team				5			24
8	(United Arab Emirates) No. 98 Into Africa Racing by Dragon				**6**			20
9	(New Zealand) No. 42 Prime Speed Sport				7			18
Pos.	Team	(Italy) MUG	(Belgium) SPA	(Italy) MIS	(France) LEC	12H	24H	Pts.
Pos.	Team	(Italy) MUG	(Belgium) SPA	(Italy) MIS	(France) LEC	(Spain) BAR		Pts.

Colour	Result
Gold	Winner
Silver	Second place
Bronze	Third place
Green	Points classification
Blue	Non-points classification
Blue	Non-classified finish (NC)
Purple	Retired, not classified (Ret)
Red	Did not qualify (DNQ)
Red	Did not pre-qualify (DNPQ)
Black	Disqualified (DSQ)
White	Did not start (DNS)
White	Withdrew (WD)
White	Race cancelled (C)
Blank	Did not practice (DNP)
Blank	Did not arrive (DNA)
Blank	Excluded (EX)

**Bold** – Pole
Italics – Fastest Lap

† – Drivers did not finish the race, but were classified as they completed over 60% of the class winner's race distance.

=== GT3 Am Drivers' Championship ===
Pos.	Drivers	Team	(Italy) MUG	(Belgium) SPA	(Italy) MIS	(France) LEC	(Spain) BAR		Pts.
Pos.	Drivers	Team	(Italy) MUG	(Belgium) SPA	(Italy) MIS	(France) LEC	12H	24H	Pts.
1	(Lithuania) Arunas Geciauskas (Italy) Nicola Michelon (Switzerland) Tim Müller	(Lithuania) Juta Racing	4	3	1	4			128
2	David Pogosyan (Kyrgyzstan) Andrey Solukovtsev (Cyprus) Vasily Vladykin	(United Kingdom) Continental Racing by Simpson Motorsport	3	6†	**3**	**1**			124
3	(Switzerland) Michael Kroll (Germany) Alexander Prinz (Switzerland) Chantal Prinz	(Switzerland) HOFOR Racing	6	**1**	2	8†			112
4	(Malaysia) Dominic Ang (Malaysia) Douglas Khoo (Malaysia) Melvin Moh	(Malaysia) Viper Niza Racing		2	4	3			96
5	(Germany) Maximilian Partl	(Switzerland) HOFOR Racing	6		2	8†			72
6	(Spain) Pablo Burguera (Spain) Oliver Campos (Spain) Antonio Sainero	(Spain) E2P Racing	Ret	5†	Ret	2			60
7	(Germany) Torsten Kratz	(Switzerland) HOFOR Racing		**1**		8†			56
8	(United Kingdom) Tom Jackson (Zimbabwe) Ameerh Naran	(Antigua and Barbuda) HAAS RT		4					52
8	(United Kingdom) Tom Jackson (Zimbabwe) Ameerh Naran	(Lithuania) Juta Racing				5			52
9	(United States) Hannah Grisham (United Kingdom) Ian James (United States) Gray Newell	(United States) Heart of Racing by SPS	**1**						40
10	(Slovakia) Miro Konôpka (China) Liang Jiatong	(Slovakia) ARC Bratislava	2	Ret					36
10	(Slovakia) Zdeno Mikulasko (Austria) Gerhard Tweraser	(Slovakia) ARC Bratislava	2						36
11	(Italy) Corinna Gostner (Italy) David Gostner (Italy) Manuela Gostner (Italy) Thomas Gostner	(Italy) MP Racing	5						24
11	(New Zealand) Francois Beziac	(Lithuania) Juta Racing				5			24
12	(Belgium) Nico Guelinckx (Belgium) Peter Guelinckx (Belgium) Jef Machiels	(Antigua and Barbuda) HAAS RT				6			20
13	(Belgium) Olivier Bertels (Belgium) Xavier Knauf (Belgium) Gregory Servais	(Antigua and Barbuda) HAAS RT		7					18
13	(Lithuania) Audrius Butkevicius (Lithuania) Vaidas Miciuda (Lithuania) Paulius Paskevicius (Lithuania) Paulius Ruskys	(Lithuania) RD Signs - Siauliai Racing Team				7			18
14	(Slovakia) Adam Konôpka (Poland) Andrzej Lewandowski	(Slovakia) ARC Bratislava		Ret					0
Pos.	Drivers	Team	(Italy) MUG	(Belgium) SPA	(Italy) MIS	(France) LEC	12H	24H	Pts.
Pos.	Drivers	Team	(Italy) MUG	(Belgium) SPA	(Italy) MIS	(France) LEC	(Spain) BAR		Pts.

Colour	Result
Gold	Winner
Silver	Second place
Bronze	Third place
Green	Points classification
Blue	Non-points classification
Blue	Non-classified finish (NC)
Purple	Retired, not classified (Ret)
Red	Did not qualify (DNQ)
Red	Did not pre-qualify (DNPQ)
Black	Disqualified (DSQ)
White	Did not start (DNS)
White	Withdrew (WD)
White	Race cancelled (C)
Blank	Did not practice (DNP)
Blank	Did not arrive (DNA)
Blank	Excluded (EX)

**Bold** – Pole
Italics – Fastest Lap

† – Drivers did not finish the race, but were classified as they completed over 60% of the class winner's race distance.

=== GT3 Am Teams' Championship ===
Pos.	Team	(Italy) MUG	(Belgium) SPA	(Italy) MIS	(France) LEC	(Spain) BAR		Pts.
Pos.	Team	(Italy) MUG	(Belgium) SPA	(Italy) MIS	(France) LEC	12H	24H	Pts.
1	(Lithuania) No. 71 Juta Racing	4	3	1	4			128
2	(United Kingdom) No. 69 Continental Racing by Simpson Motorsport	3	6†	**3**	**1**			124
3	(Switzerland) No. 11 Hofor Racing	6	1	2	8†			112
4	(Malaysia) No. 65 Viper Niza Racing		2	4	3			96
5	(Spain) No. 90 E2P Racing	Ret	**5†**	Ret	2			60
6	(United States) No. 27 Heart of Racing by SPS	**1**						40
7	(Antigua and Barbuda) No. 21 HAAS RT		7		6			38
8	(Slovakia) No. 44 ARC Bratislava	2	Ret					36
9	(Antigua and Barbuda) No. 2 HAAS RT		4					28
10	(Italy) No. 58 MP Racing	5						24
10	(Lithuania) No. 72 Juta Racing				5			24
11	(Lithuania) No. 96 RD Signs - Siauliai Racing Team				7			18
Pos.	Team	(Italy) MUG	(Belgium) SPA	(Italy) MIS	(France) LEC	12H	24H	Pts.
Pos.	Team	(Italy) MUG	(Belgium) SPA	(Italy) MIS	(France) LEC	(Spain) BAR		Pts.

Colour	Result
Gold	Winner
Silver	Second place
Bronze	Third place
Green	Points classification
Blue	Non-points classification
Blue	Non-classified finish (NC)
Purple	Retired, not classified (Ret)
Red	Did not qualify (DNQ)
Red	Did not pre-qualify (DNPQ)
Black	Disqualified (DSQ)
White	Did not start (DNS)
White	Withdrew (WD)
White	Race cancelled (C)
Blank	Did not practice (DNP)
Blank	Did not arrive (DNA)
Blank	Excluded (EX)

**Bold** – Pole
Italics – Fastest Lap

† – Drivers did not finish the race, but were classified as they completed over 60% of the class winner's race distance.

=== GTX Drivers' Championship ===
Pos.	Drivers	Team	(Italy) MUG	(Belgium) SPA	(Italy) MIS	(France) LEC	(Spain) BAR		Pts.
Pos.	Drivers	Team	(Italy) MUG	(Belgium) SPA	(Italy) MIS	(France) LEC	12H	24H	Pts.
1	(France) Lionel Amrouche (France) Philippe Bonnel (France) Cyril Calmon	(France) Vortex V8	2	1†	**1**	2			152
2	(Australia) Darren Currie	(Australia) 111 Racing	3	**3**					64
3	(France) Arnoud Gomez (France) Olivier Gomez	(France) Vortex V8	**1**			Ret			40
3	(Switzerland) Sébastien Page (Switzerland) Luis Sanjuan (France) Eric Trouillet	(Switzerland) Graff Racing				**1**			40
4	(France) Julien Boillot (France) Alexandre De Bernardinis	(France) Vortex V8		2					36
5	(Australia) Grant Donaldson	(Australia) 111 Racing	3						32
5	(Australia) Geoffrey Emery (Australia) Daniel Studdard	(Australia) 111 Racing		**3**					32
5	(France) Solenn Amrouche (France) Franck Lefèvre (France) Philippe Burel	(France) Vortex V8				3			32
6	(France) Tom Pieri	(France) Vortex V8				Ret			0
Pos.	Drivers	Team	(Italy) MUG	(Belgium) SPA	(Italy) MIS	(France) LEC	12H	24H	Pts.
Pos.	Drivers	Team	(Italy) MUG	(Belgium) SPA	(Italy) MIS	(France) LEC	(Spain) BAR		Pts.

Colour	Result
Gold	Winner
Silver	Second place
Bronze	Third place
Green	Points classification
Blue	Non-points classification
Blue	Non-classified finish (NC)
Purple	Retired, not classified (Ret)
Red	Did not qualify (DNQ)
Red	Did not pre-qualify (DNPQ)
Black	Disqualified (DSQ)
White	Did not start (DNS)
White	Withdrew (WD)
White	Race cancelled (C)
Blank	Did not practice (DNP)
Blank	Did not arrive (DNA)
Blank	Excluded (EX)

**Bold** – Pole
Italics – Fastest Lap

† – Drivers did not finish the race, but were classified as they completed over 60% of the class winner's race distance.

=== GTX Teams' Championship ===
Pos.	Team	(Italy) MUG	(Belgium) SPA	(Italy) MIS	(France) LEC	(Spain) BAR		Pts.
Pos.	Team	(Italy) MUG	(Belgium) SPA	(Italy) MIS	(France) LEC	12H	24H	Pts.
1	(France) No. 701 Vortex V8	2	1†	**1**	2			152
2	(France) No. 702 Vortex V8	**1**	2		3			108
3	(Australia) No. 111 111 Racing	3	**3**					64
4	(Switzerland) No. 709 Graff Racing				**1**			40
5	(France) No. 703 Vortex V8				Ret			0
Pos.	Team	(Italy) MUG	(Belgium) SPA	(Italy) MIS	(France) LEC	12H	24H	Pts.
Pos.	Team	(Italy) MUG	(Belgium) SPA	(Italy) MIS	(France) LEC	(Spain) BAR		Pts.

Colour	Result
Gold	Winner
Silver	Second place
Bronze	Third place
Green	Points classification
Blue	Non-points classification
Blue	Non-classified finish (NC)
Purple	Retired, not classified (Ret)
Red	Did not qualify (DNQ)
Red	Did not pre-qualify (DNPQ)
Black	Disqualified (DSQ)
White	Did not start (DNS)
White	Withdrew (WD)
White	Race cancelled (C)
Blank	Did not practice (DNP)
Blank	Did not arrive (DNA)
Blank	Excluded (EX)

**Bold** – Pole
Italics – Fastest Lap

† – Drivers did not finish the race, but were classified as they completed over 60% of the class winner's race distance.

=== 992 Drivers' Championship ===
Pos.	Drivers	Team	(Italy) MUG	(Belgium) SPA	(Italy) MIS	(France) LEC	(Spain) BAR		Pts.
Pos.	Drivers	Team	(Italy) MUG	(Belgium) SPA	(Italy) MIS	(France) LEC	12H	24H	Pts.
1	(Netherlands) Luc Breukers (Netherlands) Rik Breukers (Switzerland) Fabian Denz	(Netherlands) Red Camel-Jordans.nl	1	1	8	3			128
2	(Germany) Philip Hamprecht (Sweden) Niclas Jönsson (United States) Tracy Krohn	(Germany) RPM Racing	2	2	2	9			122
3	(Denmark) Jonas Holmgaard (Denmark) Magnus Holmgaard (Denmark) Patrick Steen Rasmussen	(Denmark) Holmgaard Motorsport	6	3	5	2			112
4	(France) Sebastien Lajoux (Netherlands) Paul Meijer (France) Stéphane Perrin	(France) SebLajoux Racing	**3**	**9†**	**3**	**4**			106
5	(Estonia) Martin Rump (Latvia) Valters Zviedris	(Belgium) Mühlner Motorsport	10†	4	9†	1			94
6	(Belgium) Mathieu Detry (Belgium) Fabian Duffieux (India) Ajith Kumar	(India) Ajith Kumar Racing	4	5	6	6†			92
7	(Netherlands) Ivo Breukers	(Netherlands) Red Camel-Jordans.nl		1	8	3			88
8	(Germany) Julian Hanses	(Belgium) Mühlner Motorsport	10†	4		1			80
9	(Denmark) Martin Vedel Mortensen	(Denmark) Holmgaard Motorsport	6	3	5				76
10	(Germany) Georg Goder (Germany) Ralf Oehme (Germany) Martin Schlüter	(Germany) 9und11 Racing		8	4	8			60
11	(Netherlands) Glenn van Berlo (Netherlands) Marcel van Berlo	(Netherlands) Van Berlo Motorsport by Bas Koeten Racing		7	1				58
12	(France) Jeremy Faligand	(France) SebLajoux Racing			**3**	5			56
12	(Spain) Pablo Bras Silvero (Spain) Pedro Miguel Lourinho Bras	(Spain) Escuderia Faraon	7	6	7				56
13	(Netherlands) Kay van Berlo	(Netherlands) Van Berlo Motorsport by Bas Koeten Racing			1				40
14	(Spain) Agustin Sanabria Crespo	(Spain) Escuderia Faraon	7	6					38
15	(Denmark) Marco Gersager	(Denmark) Holmgaard Motorsport				2			36
16	(Germany) Tim Scheerbarth	(Germany) 9und11 Racing		8		8			32
17	(Germany) Moritz Oehme	(Germany) 9und11 Racing			4				28
17	(Luxembourg) Carlos Rivas	(France) SebLajoux Racing				**4**			28
18	(Italy) Paolo Gnemmi (Italy) Riccardo Pera (Italy) Davide Roda (Italy) Paolo Venerosi	(Italy) Ebimotors	5						24
18	(France) Jean-Laurent Navarro (France) Pierre Arnaud Navarro (Belgium) Giovanni Scamardi	(France) SebLajoux Racing				5			24
19	(Netherlands) Bart van Helden	(Netherlands) Van Berlo Motorsport by Bas Koeten Racing		7					18
19	(Spain) Fernando Gonzalez Gonzalez	(Spain) Escuderia Faraon			7				18
19	(United States) José Garcia (Germany) Patrick Kolb (Switzerland) Patric Niederhauser	(Germany) Lionspeed GP				7†			18
20	(Lithuania) Robertas Kupcikas (Lithuania) Audrius Piktys (Lithuania) Tautvydas Rudokas	(Lithuania) Porsche Baltic	8						16
21	(Netherlands) Tom Coronel (Netherlands) Hjelte Hoffner (Netherlands) Jan Jaap van Roon	(Netherlands) MDM Motorsport	9						14
21	(Germany) Marlon Menden	(France) SebLajoux Racing		**9†**					14
21	(El Salvador) Rolando Saca	(Belgium) Mühlner Motorsport			9†				14
22	(Qatar) Jassim Al-Thani (Germany) Kim André Hauschild (Switzerland) Silvain Pastoris (Germany) Axel Sartingen	(Germany) HRT Performance				10			12
23	Alexey Denisov; Sergey Titarenko; Victor Titarenko	(Germany) HRT Performance	11						10
24	(Germany) Felipe Fernández Laser (Germany) David Jahn (Germany) Nick Salewsky	(Belgium) Mühlner Motorsport		Ret					0
Pos.	Drivers	Team	(Italy) MUG	(Belgium) SPA	(Italy) MIS	(France) LEC	12H	24H	Pts.
Pos.	Drivers	Team	(Italy) MUG	(Belgium) SPA	(Italy) MIS	(France) LEC	(Spain) BAR		Pts.

Colour	Result
Gold	Winner
Silver	Second place
Bronze	Third place
Green	Points classification
Blue	Non-points classification
Blue	Non-classified finish (NC)
Purple	Retired, not classified (Ret)
Red	Did not qualify (DNQ)
Red	Did not pre-qualify (DNPQ)
Black	Disqualified (DSQ)
White	Did not start (DNS)
White	Withdrew (WD)
White	Race cancelled (C)
Blank	Did not practice (DNP)
Blank	Did not arrive (DNA)
Blank	Excluded (EX)

**Bold** – Pole
Italics – Fastest Lap

† – Drivers did not finish the race, but were classified as they completed over 60% of the class winner's race distance.

=== 992 Teams' Championship ===
Pos.	Team	(Italy) MUG	(Belgium) SPA	(Italy) MIS	(France) LEC	(Spain) BAR		Pts.
Pos.	Team	(Italy) MUG	(Belgium) SPA	(Italy) MIS	(France) LEC	12H	24H	Pts.
1	(Netherlands) No. 909 Red Camel-Jordans.nl	1	1	8	3			128
2	(Germany) No. 907 RPM Racing	2	2	2	9			122
3	(Denmark) No. 902 Holmgaard Motorsport	6	3	5	2			112
4	(France) No. 888 SebLajoux Racing	**3**	**9†**	**3**	**4**			106
5	(Belgium) No. 921 Mühlner Motorsport	10†	4	9†	1			94
6	(India) No. 901 Ajith Kumar Racing	4	5†	6	6†			92
7	(Germany) No. 911 9und11 Racing		8	4	8			60
8	(Netherlands) No. 925 Van Berlo Motorsport by Bas Koeten Racing		7†	1				58
9	(Spain) No. 949 Escuderia Faraon	7	6	7				56
10	(France) No. 910 SebLajoux Racing				5			24
10	(Italy) No. 973 Ebimotors	5						24
11	(Germany) No. 928 HRT Performance	11			10			22
12	(Germany) No. 957 Lionspeed GP				7†			18
13	(Lithuania) No. 992 Porsche Baltic	8						16
14	(Netherlands) No. 965 MDM Motorsport	9						14
15	(Belgium) No. 918 Mühlner Motorsport		Ret					0
Pos.	Team	(Italy) MUG	(Belgium) SPA	(Italy) MIS	(France) LEC	12H	24H	Pts.
Pos.	Team	(Italy) MUG	(Belgium) SPA	(Italy) MIS	(France) LEC	(Spain) BAR		Pts.

Colour	Result
Gold	Winner
Silver	Second place
Bronze	Third place
Green	Points classification
Blue	Non-points classification
Blue	Non-classified finish (NC)
Purple	Retired, not classified (Ret)
Red	Did not qualify (DNQ)
Red	Did not pre-qualify (DNPQ)
Black	Disqualified (DSQ)
White	Did not start (DNS)
White	Withdrew (WD)
White	Race cancelled (C)
Blank	Did not practice (DNP)
Blank	Did not arrive (DNA)
Blank	Excluded (EX)

**Bold** – Pole
Italics – Fastest Lap

† – Drivers did not finish the race, but were classified as they completed over 60% of the class winner's race distance.

=== 992 Am Drivers' Championship ===
Pos.	Drivers	Team	(Italy) MUG	(Belgium) SPA	(Italy) MIS	(France) LEC	(Spain) BAR		Pts.
Pos.	Drivers	Team	(Italy) MUG	(Belgium) SPA	(Italy) MIS	(France) LEC	12H	24H	Pts.
1	(Germany) Philip Hamprecht (Sweden) Niclas Jönsson (United States) Tracy Krohn	(Germany) RPM Racing	1	1	1	6			140
2	(France) Sebastien Lajoux (Netherlands) Paul Meijer (France) Stéphane Perrin	(France) SebLajoux Racing	**2**	**6†**	**2**	**2**			128
3	(Belgium) Mathieu Detry (Belgium) Fabian Duffieux (India) Ajith Kumar	(India) Ajith Kumar Racing	3	2†	4	4†			124
4	(Spain) Pablo Bras Silvero (Spain) Pedro Miguel Lourinho Bras	(Spain) Escuderia Faraon	5	3	5				80
4	(Germany) Georg Goder (Germany) Ralf Oehme (Germany) Martin Schlüter	(Germany) 9und11 Racing		5	3	5			80
5	(France) Jeremy Faligand	(France) SebLajoux Racing			**2**	3			68
6	(Spain) Agustin Sanabria Crespo	(Spain) Escuderia Faraon	5	3					56
7	(Germany) Tim Scheerbarth	(Germany) 9und11 Racing		5		5			48
8	(Denmark) Marco Gersager (Denmark) Jonas Holmgaard (Denmark) Magnus Holmgaard (Denmark) Patrick Steen Rasmussen	(Denmark) Holmgaard Motorsport				1			40
9	(Luxembourg) Carlos Rivas	(France) SebLajoux Racing				**2**			36
10	(Germany) Moritz Oehme	(Germany) 9und11 Racing			3				32
10	(France) Jean-Laurent Navarro (France) Pierre Arnaud Navarro (Belgium) Giovanni Scamardi	(France) SebLajoux Racing				3			32
11	(Netherlands) Bart van Helden (Netherlands) Glenn van Berlo (Netherlands) Marcel van Berlo	(Netherlands) Van Berlo Motorsport by Bas Koeten Racing		4†					28
11	(Italy) Paolo Gnemmi (Italy) Riccardo Pera (Italy) Davide Roda (Italy) Paolo Venerosi	(Italy) Ebimotors	4						28
12	(Spain) Fernando Gonzalez Gonzalez	(Spain) Escuderia Faraon			5				24
13	(Lithuania) Robertas Kupcikas (Lithuania) Audrius Piktys (Lithuania) Tautvydas Rudokas	(Lithuania) Porsche Baltic	6						20
13	(Germany) Marlon Menden	(France) SebLajoux Racing		**6†**					20
14	Alexey Denisov; Sergey Titarenko; Victor Titarenko	(France) SebLajoux Racing	7						18
14	(Qatar) Jassim Al-Thani (Germany) Kim André Hauschild (Switzerland) Silvain Pastoris (Germany) Axel Sartingen	(Germany) HRT Performance				7			18
Pos.	Drivers	Team	(Italy) MUG	(Belgium) SPA	(Italy) MIS	(France) LEC	12H	24H	Pts.
Pos.	Drivers	Team	(Italy) MUG	(Belgium) SPA	(Italy) MIS	(France) LEC	(Spain) BAR		Pts.

Colour	Result
Gold	Winner
Silver	Second place
Bronze	Third place
Green	Points classification
Blue	Non-points classification
Blue	Non-classified finish (NC)
Purple	Retired, not classified (Ret)
Red	Did not qualify (DNQ)
Red	Did not pre-qualify (DNPQ)
Black	Disqualified (DSQ)
White	Did not start (DNS)
White	Withdrew (WD)
White	Race cancelled (C)
Blank	Did not practice (DNP)
Blank	Did not arrive (DNA)
Blank	Excluded (EX)

**Bold** – Pole
Italics – Fastest Lap

† – Drivers did not finish the race, but were classified as they completed over 60% of the class winner's race distance.

=== 992 Am Teams' Championship ===
Pos.	Team	(Italy) MUG	(Belgium) SPA	(Italy) MIS	(France) LEC	(Spain) BAR		Pts.
Pos.	Team	(Italy) MUG	(Belgium) SPA	(Italy) MIS	(France) LEC	12H	24H	Pts.
1	(Germany) No. 907 RPM Racing	1	1	1	6			140
2	(France) No. 888 SebLajoux Racing	**2**	**6†**	**2**	**2**			128
3	(India) No. 901 Ajith Kumar Racing by Red Ant	3	2†	4	4†			124
4	(Germany) No. 911 9und11 Racing		5	3	5			80
4	(Spain) No. 949 Escuderia Faraon	5	3	5				80
5	(Denmark) No. 902 Holmgaard Motorsport				1			40
6	(Germany) No. 928 HRT Performance	7			7			36
7	(France) No. 910 SebLajoux Racing				3			32
8	(Netherlands) No. 925 Van Berlo Motorsport by Bas Koeten Racing		4†					28
8	(Italy) No. 973 Ebimotors	4						28
9	(Lithuania) No. 992 Porsche Baltic	6						20
Pos.	Team	(Italy) MUG	(Belgium) SPA	(Italy) MIS	(France) LEC	12H	24H	Pts.
Pos.	Team	(Italy) MUG	(Belgium) SPA	(Italy) MIS	(France) LEC	(Spain) BAR		Pts.

Colour	Result
Gold	Winner
Silver	Second place
Bronze	Third place
Green	Points classification
Blue	Non-points classification
Blue	Non-classified finish (NC)
Purple	Retired, not classified (Ret)
Red	Did not qualify (DNQ)
Red	Did not pre-qualify (DNPQ)
Black	Disqualified (DSQ)
White	Did not start (DNS)
White	Withdrew (WD)
White	Race cancelled (C)
Blank	Did not practice (DNP)
Blank	Did not arrive (DNA)
Blank	Excluded (EX)

**Bold** – Pole
Italics – Fastest Lap

† – Drivers did not finish the race, but were classified as they completed over 60% of the class winner's race distance.

=== GT4 Drivers' Championship ===
Pos.	Drivers	Team	(Italy) MUG	(Belgium) SPA	(Italy) MIS	(France) LEC	(Spain) BAR		Pts.
Pos.	Drivers	Team	(Italy) MUG	(Belgium) SPA	(Italy) MIS	(France) LEC	12H	24H	Pts.
1	(United Kingdom) Matthew George (United Kingdom) Christopher Jones (United Kingdom) Neville Jones	(United Kingdom) Venture Engineering	**1**	Ret	**1**	**1**			120
2	(Belgium) Kris Verhoeven (Belgium) Mark Verhoeven (Belgium) Rob Verhoeven	(Belgium) Hamofa Motorsport		**3**		2			68
3	(United Kingdom) Matthew Higgins	(United Kingdom) Venture Engineering	**1**	Ret					40
3	(France) Thierry Chkondali (France) Marc Girard (Canada) Michel Sallenbach	(Germany) SRS Team Sorg Rennsport		1					40
4	(Germany) Jim Gebhardt (Germany) Nikolas Gebhardt	(Germany) CCS Racing	**2**						36
4	(United Kingdom) Harley Haughton (Germany) Maximilian Hill (New Zealand) Guy Stewart (Mexico) Benito Tagle	(Germany) SRS Team Sorg Rennsport		2					36
5	(Italy) Stefano d'Aste (Italy) Massimo Abbati (Italy) Alberto Naska (Italy) Massimiliano Schiavone	(Italy) Lotus PB Racing	3						32
Pos.	Drivers	Team	(Italy) MUG	(Belgium) SPA	(Italy) MIS	(France) LEC	12H	24H	Pts.
Pos.	Drivers	Team	(Italy) MUG	(Belgium) SPA	(Italy) MIS	(France) LEC	(Spain) BAR		Pts.

Colour	Result
Gold	Winner
Silver	Second place
Bronze	Third place
Green	Points classification
Blue	Non-points classification
Blue	Non-classified finish (NC)
Purple	Retired, not classified (Ret)
Red	Did not qualify (DNQ)
Red	Did not pre-qualify (DNPQ)
Black	Disqualified (DSQ)
White	Did not start (DNS)
White	Withdrew (WD)
White	Race cancelled (C)
Blank	Did not practice (DNP)
Blank	Did not arrive (DNA)
Blank	Excluded (EX)

**Bold** – Pole
Italics – Fastest Lap

† – Drivers did not finish the race, but were classified as they completed over 60% of the class winner's race distance.

=== GT4 Teams' Championship ===
Pos.	Team	(Italy) MUG	(Belgium) SPA	(Italy) MIS	(France) LEC	(Spain) BAR		Pts.
Pos.	Team	(Italy) MUG	(Belgium) SPA	(Italy) MIS	(France) LEC	12H	24H	Pts.
1	(United Kingdom) No. 421 Venture Engineering	**1**	Ret	**1**	**1**			120
2	(Belgium) No. 419 Hamofa Motorsport		**3**		2			68
3	(Germany) No. 427 SRS Team Sorg Rennsport		1					40
4	(Germany) No. 410 CCS Racing	**2**						36
4	(Germany) No. 452 SRS Team Sorg Rennsport		2					36
5	(Italy) No. 426 Lotus PB Racing	3						32
Pos.	Team	(Italy) MUG	(Belgium) SPA	(Italy) MIS	(France) LEC	12H	24H	Pts.
Pos.	Team	(Italy) MUG	(Belgium) SPA	(Italy) MIS	(France) LEC	(Spain) BAR		Pts.

Colour	Result
Gold	Winner
Silver	Second place
Bronze	Third place
Green	Points classification
Blue	Non-points classification
Blue	Non-classified finish (NC)
Purple	Retired, not classified (Ret)
Red	Did not qualify (DNQ)
Red	Did not pre-qualify (DNPQ)
Black	Disqualified (DSQ)
White	Did not start (DNS)
White	Withdrew (WD)
White	Race cancelled (C)
Blank	Did not practice (DNP)
Blank	Did not arrive (DNA)
Blank	Excluded (EX)

**Bold** – Pole
Italics – Fastest Lap

† – Drivers did not finish the race, but were classified as they completed over 60% of the class winner's race distance.

=== TCE Drivers' Championship ===
Pos.	Drivers	Team	(Italy) MUG	(Belgium) SPA	(Italy) MIS	(France) LEC	(Spain) BAR		Pts.
Pos.	Drivers	Team	(Italy) MUG	(Belgium) SPA	(Italy) MIS	(France) LEC	12H	24H	Pts.
1	(United Kingdom) Kevin Clarke (United Kingdom) James Collins	(United Kingdom) J-Mec Engineering		**1**					40
2	(Germany) Christian Ladurner (Germany) Pia Ohlsson (Japan) Junichi Umemoto	(Germany) asBest Racing		2					36
Pos.	Drivers	Team	(Italy) MUG	(Belgium) SPA	(Italy) MIS	(France) LEC	12H	24H	Pts.
Pos.	Drivers	Team	(Italy) MUG	(Belgium) SPA	(Italy) MIS	(France) LEC	(Spain) BAR		Pts.

Colour	Result
Gold	Winner
Silver	Second place
Bronze	Third place
Green	Points classification
Blue	Non-points classification
Blue	Non-classified finish (NC)
Purple	Retired, not classified (Ret)
Red	Did not qualify (DNQ)
Red	Did not pre-qualify (DNPQ)
Black	Disqualified (DSQ)
White	Did not start (DNS)
White	Withdrew (WD)
White	Race cancelled (C)
Blank	Did not practice (DNP)
Blank	Did not arrive (DNA)
Blank	Excluded (EX)

**Bold** – Pole
Italics – Fastest Lap

† – Drivers did not finish the race, but were classified as they completed over 60% of the class winner's race distance.

=== TCE Teams' Championship ===
Pos.	Team	(Italy) MUG	(Belgium) SPA	(Italy) MIS	(France) LEC	(Spain) BAR		Pts.
Pos.	Team	(Italy) MUG	(Belgium) SPA	(Italy) MIS	(France) LEC	12H	24H	Pts.
-	(Germany) No. 102 asBest Racing		2			1	1	-
-	(Germany) No. 111 asBest Racing					3	3	-
-	(United States) No. 123 THRW Honda Racing					2	4	-
-	(United States) No. 124 THRW Honda Racing					4	2	-
-	(United Kingdom) No. 133 J-Mec Engineering		**1**			**5**	Ret	-
Pos.	Team	(Italy) MUG	(Belgium) SPA	(Italy) MIS	(France) LEC	12H	24H	Pts.
Pos.	Team	(Italy) MUG	(Belgium) SPA	(Italy) MIS	(France) LEC	(Spain) BAR		Pts.

Colour	Result
Gold	Winner
Silver	Second place
Bronze	Third place
Green	Points classification
Blue	Non-points classification
Blue	Non-classified finish (NC)
Purple	Retired, not classified (Ret)
Red	Did not qualify (DNQ)
Red	Did not pre-qualify (DNPQ)
Black	Disqualified (DSQ)
White	Did not start (DNS)
White	Withdrew (WD)
White	Race cancelled (C)
Blank	Did not practice (DNP)
Blank	Did not arrive (DNA)
Blank	Excluded (EX)

**Bold** – Pole
Italics – Fastest Lap

† – Drivers did not finish the race, but were classified as they completed over 60% of the class winner's race distance.

=== TCX Drivers' Championship ===
Pos.	Drivers	Team	(Italy) MUG	(Belgium) SPA	(Italy) MIS	(France) LEC	(Spain) BAR		Pts.
Pos.	Drivers	Team	(Italy) MUG	(Belgium) SPA	(Italy) MIS	(France) LEC	12H	24H	Pts.
1	(United Kingdom) Kevin Clarke (United Kingdom) James Collins	(United Kingdom) J-Mec Engineering		**1**					40
2	(Germany) Christian Ladurner (Germany) Pia Ohlsson (Japan) Junichi Umemoto	(Germany) asBest Racing		2					36
Pos.	Drivers	Team	(Italy) MUG	(Belgium) SPA	(Italy) MIS	(France) LEC	12H	24H	Pts.
Pos.	Drivers	Team	(Italy) MUG	(Belgium) SPA	(Italy) MIS	(France) LEC	(Spain) BAR		Pts.

Colour	Result
Gold	Winner
Silver	Second place
Bronze	Third place
Green	Points classification
Blue	Non-points classification
Blue	Non-classified finish (NC)
Purple	Retired, not classified (Ret)
Red	Did not qualify (DNQ)
Red	Did not pre-qualify (DNPQ)
Black	Disqualified (DSQ)
White	Did not start (DNS)
White	Withdrew (WD)
White	Race cancelled (C)
Blank	Did not practice (DNP)
Blank	Did not arrive (DNA)
Blank	Excluded (EX)

**Bold** – Pole
Italics – Fastest Lap

† – Drivers did not finish the race, but were classified as they completed over 60% of the class winner's race distance.

=== TCX Teams' Championship ===
Pos.	Team	(Italy) MUG	(Belgium) SPA	(Italy) MIS	(France) LEC	(Spain) BAR		Pts.
Pos.	Team	(Italy) MUG	(Belgium) SPA	(Italy) MIS	(France) LEC	12H	24H	Pts.
-	(Germany) No. 102 asBest Racing		2			1	1	-
-	(Germany) No. 111 asBest Racing					3	3	-
-	(United States) No. 123 THRW Honda Racing					2	4	-
-	(United States) No. 124 THRW Honda Racing					4	2	-
-	(United Kingdom) No. 133 J-Mec Engineering		**1**			**5**	Ret	-
Pos.	Team	(Italy) MUG	(Belgium) SPA	(Italy) MIS	(France) LEC	12H	24H	Pts.
Pos.	Team	(Italy) MUG	(Belgium) SPA	(Italy) MIS	(France) LEC	(Spain) BAR		Pts.

Colour	Result
Gold	Winner
Silver	Second place
Bronze	Third place
Green	Points classification
Blue	Non-points classification
Blue	Non-classified finish (NC)
Purple	Retired, not classified (Ret)
Red	Did not qualify (DNQ)
Red	Did not pre-qualify (DNPQ)
Black	Disqualified (DSQ)
White	Did not start (DNS)
White	Withdrew (WD)
White	Race cancelled (C)
Blank	Did not practice (DNP)
Blank	Did not arrive (DNA)
Blank	Excluded (EX)

**Bold** – Pole
Italics – Fastest Lap

† – Drivers did not finish the race, but were classified as they completed over 60% of the class winner's race distance.
