= 2025 12 Hours of Misano =

The layout of Misano World Circuit, where the race was held

The 2025 12 Hours of Misano (known as the 2025 Michelin 12 Hours of Misano for sponsorship reasons) was an endurance sportscar race held between 23 and 24 May 2025, in Misano Adriatico, Italy, as the third of five rounds of the 2025 24H Series. It was the second running of the event as part of the 24H Series.

== Background ==
The event was announced on 24 September 2024 along with the rest of the 2025 24H Series calendar.

== Entry list ==
The entry list was announced on 16 May 2025, and features 21 entries over 4 classes – 10 in GT3, 1 in GTX, 9 in 992, and 1 in GT4.

No.	Entrant	Car	Class	Driver 1	Driver 2	Driver 3	Driver 4
GT3 (10 entries)
11	(Switzerland) Hofor Racing	Mercedes-AMG GT3 Evo	Am	(Switzerland) Michael Kroll	(Germany) Maximilian Partl	(Germany) Alexander Prinz	(Switzerland) Chantal Prinz
21	(Antigua and Barbuda) HAAS RT	Audi R8 LMS Evo II	Am	(Belgium) Peter Guelinckx	(Belgium) Jef Machiels	(Belgium) Matisse Lismont	
56	(Czech Republic) Scuderia Praha	Ferrari 296 GT3	PA	(Czech Republic) Josef Král	(Czech Republic) Matúš Výboh	(Czech Republic) Miroslav Výboh	(Czech Republic) Dennis Waszek
65	(Malaysia) Viper Niza Racing	Mercedes-AMG GT3 Evo	Am	(Malaysia) Dominic Ang	(Malaysia) Douglas Khoo	(Malaysia) Melvin Moh	
69	(United Kingdom) Continental Racing by Simpson Motorsport	Audi R8 LMS Evo II	Am	David Pogosyan	(Kyrgyzstan) Andrey Solukovtsev	(Cyprus) Vasily Vladykin	
71	(Lithuania) Juta Racing	Audi R8 LMS Evo II	Am	(Lithuania) Arunas Geciauskas	(Italy) Nicola Michelon	(Switzerland) Tim Müller	
73	(Germany) Proton Huber Competition	Porsche 911 GT3 R (992)	PA	(Austria) Klaus Bachler	(Germany) Jörg Dreisow	(Germany) Manuel Lauck	(Germany) Constantin Dressler
81	(United States) Era Motorsport	Ferrari 296 GT3	PA	(Belgium) Nico Verdonck	(United States) Dwight Merriman	(United States) Kyle Tilley	(United States) Ryan Dalziel
90	(Spain) E2P Racing	Aston Martin Vantage AMR GT3 Evo	Am	(Spain) Pablo Burguera	(Spain) Oliver Campos	(Spain) Antonio Sainero	
93	(Belgium) Red Ant Racing	Mercedes-AMG GT3 Evo	P	(Belgium) Kobe de Breucker	(Germany) Kenneth Heyer	(Belgium) Ayrton Redant	(Belgium) Yannick Redant
GTX (1 entry)
701	(France) Vortex V8	Vortex 2.0		(France) Lionel Amrouche	(France) Philippe Bonnel	(France) Cyril Calmon	
992 (9 entries)
888	(France) SebLajoux Racing	Porsche 992 GT3 Cup	Am	(France) Jeremy Faligand	(France) Sebastien Lajoux	(Netherlands) Paul Meijer	(France) Stephane Perrin
901	(India) Ajith Kumar Racing by Red Ant	Porsche 992 GT3 Cup	Am	(Belgium) Mathieu Detry	(Belgium) Fabian Duffieux	(India) Ajith Kumar	
902	(Denmark) Holmgaard Motorsport	Porsche 992 GT3 Cup	P	(Denmark) Jonas Holmgaard	(Denmark) Magnus Holmgaard	(Denmark) Martin Mortensen	(Denmark) Patrick Rasmussen
907	(Germany) RPM Racing	Porsche 992 GT3 Cup	Am	(Germany) Philip Hamprecht	(Sweden) Niclas Jönsson	(United States) Tracy Krohn	
909	(Netherlands) Red Camel-Jordans.nl	Porsche 992 GT3 Cup	P	(Netherlands) Luc Breukers	(Netherlands) Rik Breukers	(Switzerland) Fabian Denz	(Netherlands) Ivo Breukers
911	(Germany) 9und11 Racing	Porsche 992 GT3 Cup	Am	(Germany) Georg Goder	(Germany) Ralf Oehme	(Germany) Martin Schlüter	(Germany) Moritz Oehme
921	(Belgium) Mühlner Motorsport	Porsche 992 GT3 Cup	P	(Estonia) Martin Rump	(Latvia) Valters Zviedris	(El Salvador) Rolando Saca	
925	(Netherlands) Van Berlo Motorsport by Bas Koeten Racing	Porsche 992 GT3 Cup	P	(Netherlands) Glenn van Berlo	(Netherlands) Marcel van Berlo	(Netherlands) Kay van Berlo	
949	(Spain) Escuderia Faraon	Porsche 992 GT3 Cup	Am	(Spain) Pablo Bras Silvero	(Spain) Pedro Miguel Lourinho Bras	(Spain) Fernando Gonzalez Gonzalez	
GT4 (1 entry)
421	(United Kingdom) Venture Engineering	Mercedes-AMG GT4		(United Kingdom) Matthew George	(United Kingdom) Christopher Jones	(United Kingdom) Neville Jones	

GT3 entries
Icon	Class
P	GT3-Pro
PA	GT3-Pro/Am
Am	GT3-Am
992 entries
Icon	Class
P	992-Pro
Am	992-Am

== Schedule ==
Date	Time (local: CET)	Event	Duration
Friday, 23 May	11:30 - 13:00	Free practice	90 minutes
Friday, 23 May	15:30 - 16:25	Qualifying - TCE, GT4, GTX & 992	3x15 minutes
Friday, 23 May	16:40 - 17:35	Qualifying - GT3	3x15 minutes
Saturday, 24 May	09:30 - 21:30	Race	12 hours

== Free Practice ==
Class	No.	Entrant	Driver	Time
GT3	93	(Belgium) Red Ant Racing	(Belgium) Kobe de Breucker	1:34.620
GTX	701	(France) Vortex V8	(France) Lionel Amrouche	1:54.332
992	925	(Netherlands) Van Berlo Motorsport by Bas Koeten Racing	(Netherlands) Glenn van Berlo	1:37.306
GT4	421	(United Kingdom) Venture Engineering	(United Kingdom) Matthew George	1:55.697

- Note: Only the fastest car in each class is shown.

== Qualifying ==
Qualifying was split into three parts with two groups. The average of the best times per qualifying session determined the starting order. Proton Huber Competition secured pole position with a combined average time of 1:33.586.

=== Qualifying results ===
Pole position winners in each class are marked in bold.

==== GT4, GTX & 992 ====
Pos.	Class	No.	Team	Avg
1	**992 Pro**	**909**	**(Netherlands) Red Camel-Jordans.nl**	**1:37.240**
2	992 Pro	925	(Netherlands) Van Berlo Motorsport by Bas Koeten Racing	1:37.572
3	992 Pro	902	(Denmark) Holmgaard Motorsport	1:37.586
4	992 Pro	921	(Belgium) Mühlner Motorsport	1:37.797
5	**992 Am**	**888**	**(France) SebLajoux Racing**	**1:38.107**
6	992 Am	907	(Germany) RPM Racing	1:38.232
7	992 Am	901	(India) Ajith Kumar Racing by Red Ant	1:39.092
8	992 Am	949	(Spain) Escuderia Faraon	1:39.556
9	**GTX**	**701**	**(France) Vortex V8**	**1:39.903**
10	992 Am	911	(Germany) 9und11 Racing	1:41.347
11	**GT4**	**421**	**(United Kingdom) Venture Engineering**	**1:45.596**

==== GT3 ====
Pos.	Class	No.	Team	Avg
1	**GT3 Pro/Am**	**73**	**(Germany) Proton Huber Competition**	**1:33.586**
2	**GT3 Pro**	**93**	**(Belgium) Red Ant Racing**	**1:33.600**
3	**GT3 Am**	**69**	**(United Arab Emirates) Continental Racing by Simpson Motorsport**	**1:34.187**
4	GT3 Am	21	(Antigua and Barbuda) HAAS RT	1:34.193
5	GT3 Pro/Am	56	(Czech Republic) Scuderia Praha	1:34.311
6	GT3 Am	90	(Spain) E2P Racing	1:34.811
7	GT3 Am	71	(Lithuania) Juta Racing	1:34.943
8	GT3 Pro/Am	81	(United States) Era Motorsport	1:35.023
9	GT3 Am	11	(Switzerland) Hofor Racing	1:35.067
10	GT3 Am	65	(Malaysia) Viper Niza Racing	1:35.562

== Race ==
The race was won overall by the No. 21 HAAS RT Audi R8 LMS Evo II followed by the No. 73 Proton Huber Competition Porsche 911 GT3 R (992) in second and the No. 93 Red Ant Racing Mercedes-AMG GT3 Evo in third.

=== Race results ===
Class winners are in bold.

Pos	Class	No.	Team	Drivers	Car	Laps	Time/Retired
Pos	Class	No.	Team	Drivers	Engine	Laps	Time/Retired
1	**GT3 Am**	**21**	**(Antigua and Barbuda) HAAS RT**	**(Belgium) Peter Guelinckx** **(Belgium) Jef Machiels** **(Belgium) Matisse Lismont**	**Audi R8 LMS Evo II**	**416**	**12:00:26.787**
1	**GT3 Am**	**21**	**(Antigua and Barbuda) HAAS RT**	**(Belgium) Peter Guelinckx** **(Belgium) Jef Machiels** **(Belgium) Matisse Lismont**	**Audi DAR 5.2 L V10**	**416**	**12:00:26.787**
2	**GT3 Pro/Am**	**73**	**(Germany) Proton Huber Competition**	**(Austria) Klaus Bachler** **(Germany) Jörg Dreisow** **(Germany) Manuel Lauck** **(Germany) Constantin Dressler**	**Porsche 911 GT3 R (992)**	**416**	**+59.324**
2	**GT3 Pro/Am**	**73**	**(Germany) Proton Huber Competition**	**(Austria) Klaus Bachler** **(Germany) Jörg Dreisow** **(Germany) Manuel Lauck** **(Germany) Constantin Dressler**	**Porsche M97/80 4.2 L Flat-6**	**416**	**+59.324**
3	**GT3 Pro**	**93**	**(Belgium) Red Ant Racing**	**(Belgium) Kobe de Breucker** **(Germany) Kenneth Heyer** **(Belgium) Ayrton Redant** **(Belgium) Yannick Redant**	**Mercedes-AMG GT3 Evo**	**414**	**+2 Laps**
3	**GT3 Pro**	**93**	**(Belgium) Red Ant Racing**	**(Belgium) Kobe de Breucker** **(Germany) Kenneth Heyer** **(Belgium) Ayrton Redant** **(Belgium) Yannick Redant**	**Mercedes-AMG M159 6.2 L V8**	**414**	**+2 Laps**
4	GT3 Am	71	(Lithuania) Juta Racing	(Lithuania) Arunas Geciauskas (Italy) Nicola Michelon (Switzerland) Tim Müller	Audi R8 LMS Evo II	411	+5 Laps
4	GT3 Am	71	(Lithuania) Juta Racing	(Lithuania) Arunas Geciauskas (Italy) Nicola Michelon (Switzerland) Tim Müller	Audi DAR 5.2 L V10	411	+5 Laps
5	GT3 Pro/Am	56	(Czech Republic) Scuderia Praha	(Czech Republic) Josef Král (Czech Republic) Matúš Výboh (Czech Republic) Miroslav Výboh (Czech Republic) Dennis Waszek	Ferrari 296 GT3	411	+5 Laps
5	GT3 Pro/Am	56	(Czech Republic) Scuderia Praha	(Czech Republic) Josef Král (Czech Republic) Matúš Výboh (Czech Republic) Miroslav Výboh (Czech Republic) Dennis Waszek	Ferrari F163CE 3.0 L Turbo V6	411	+5 Laps
6	GT3 Am	11	(Switzerland) Hofor Racing	(Switzerland) Michael Kroll (Germany) Maximilian Partl (Germany) Alexander Prinz (Switzerland) Chantal Prinz	Mercedes-AMG GT3 Evo	410	+6 Laps
6	GT3 Am	11	(Switzerland) Hofor Racing	(Switzerland) Michael Kroll (Germany) Maximilian Partl (Germany) Alexander Prinz (Switzerland) Chantal Prinz	Mercedes-AMG M159 6.2 L V8	410	+6 Laps
7	**992 Pro**	**925**	**(Netherlands) Van Berlo Motorsport by Bas Koeten Racing**	**(Netherlands) Glenn van Berlo** **(Netherlands) Marcel van Berlo** **(Netherlands) Kay van Berlo**	**Porsche 992 GT3 Cup**	**404**	**+12 Laps**
7	**992 Pro**	**925**	**(Netherlands) Van Berlo Motorsport by Bas Koeten Racing**	**(Netherlands) Glenn van Berlo** **(Netherlands) Marcel van Berlo** **(Netherlands) Kay van Berlo**	**Porsche 4.0 L Flat-6**	**404**	**+12 Laps**
8	GT3 Pro/Am	81	(United States) Era Motorsport	(Belgium) Nico Verdonck (United States) Dwight Merriman (United States) Kyle Tilley (United States) Ryan Dalziel	Ferrari 296 GT3	400	+16 Laps
8	GT3 Pro/Am	81	(United States) Era Motorsport	(Belgium) Nico Verdonck (United States) Dwight Merriman (United States) Kyle Tilley (United States) Ryan Dalziel	Ferrari F163CE 3.0 L Turbo V6	400	+16 Laps
9	**992 Am**	**907**	**(Germany) RPM Racing**	**(Germany) Philip Hamprecht** **(Sweden) Niclas Jönsson** **(United States) Tracy Krohn**	**Porsche 992 GT3 Cup**	**397**	**+19 Laps**
9	**992 Am**	**907**	**(Germany) RPM Racing**	**(Germany) Philip Hamprecht** **(Sweden) Niclas Jönsson** **(United States) Tracy Krohn**	**Porsche 4.0 L Flat-6**	**397**	**+19 Laps**
10	992 Am	888	(France) SebLajoux Racing	(France) Jeremy Faligand (France) Sebastien Lajoux (Netherlands) Paul Meijer (France) Stephane Perrin	Porsche 992 GT3 Cup	388	+28 Laps
10	992 Am	888	(France) SebLajoux Racing	(France) Jeremy Faligand (France) Sebastien Lajoux (Netherlands) Paul Meijer (France) Stephane Perrin	Porsche 4.0 L Flat-6	388	+28 Laps
11	992 Am	911	(Germany) 9und11 Racing	(Germany) Georg Goder (Germany) Ralf Oehme (Germany) Martin Schlüter (Germany) Tim Scheerbarth	Porsche 992 GT3 Cup	379	+37 Laps
11	992 Am	911	(Germany) 9und11 Racing	(Germany) Georg Goder (Germany) Ralf Oehme (Germany) Martin Schlüter (Germany) Tim Scheerbarth	Porsche 4.0 L Flat-6	379	+37 Laps
12	992 Pro	902	(Denmark) Holmgaard Motorsport	(Denmark) Jonas Holmgaard (Denmark) Magnus Holmgaard (Denmark) Martin Mortensen (Denmark) Patrick Rasmussen	Porsche 992 GT3 Cup	374	+42 Laps
12	992 Pro	902	(Denmark) Holmgaard Motorsport	(Denmark) Jonas Holmgaard (Denmark) Magnus Holmgaard (Denmark) Martin Mortensen (Denmark) Patrick Rasmussen	Porsche 4.0 L Flat-6	374	+42 Laps
13	**GT4**	**421**	**(United Kingdom) Venture Engineering**	**(United Kingdom) Matthew George** **(United Kingdom) Christopher Jones** **(United Kingdom) Neville Jones**	**Mercedes-AMG GT4**	**374**	**+42 Laps**
13	**GT4**	**421**	**(United Kingdom) Venture Engineering**	**(United Kingdom) Matthew George** **(United Kingdom) Christopher Jones** **(United Kingdom) Neville Jones**	**Mercedes-AMG M178 4.0 L V8**	**374**	**+42 Laps**
14	992 Am	901	(India) Ajith Kumar Racing by Red Ant	(Belgium) Mathieu Detry (Belgium) Fabian Duffieux (India) Ajith Kumar	Porsche 992 GT3 Cup	367	+49 Laps
14	992 Am	901	(India) Ajith Kumar Racing by Red Ant	(Belgium) Mathieu Detry (Belgium) Fabian Duffieux (India) Ajith Kumar	Porsche 4.0 L Flat-6	367	+49 Laps
15	992 Am	949	(Spain) Escuderia Faraon	(Spain) Pablo Bras Silvero (Spain) Pedro Miguel Lourinho Bras (Spain) Fernando Gonzalez Gonzalez	Porsche 992 GT3 Cup	365	+51 Laps
15	992 Am	949	(Spain) Escuderia Faraon	(Spain) Pablo Bras Silvero (Spain) Pedro Miguel Lourinho Bras (Spain) Fernando Gonzalez Gonzalez	Porsche 4.0 L Flat-6	365	+51 Laps
16	GT3 Am	69	(United Arab Emirates) Continental Racing by Simpson Motorsport	David Pogosyan (Kyrgyzstan) Andrey Solukovtsev (Cyprus) Vasily Vladykin	Audi R8 LMS Evo II	362	+54 Laps
16	GT3 Am	69	(United Arab Emirates) Continental Racing by Simpson Motorsport	David Pogosyan (Kyrgyzstan) Andrey Solukovtsev (Cyprus) Vasily Vladykin	Audi DAR 5.2 L V10	362	+54 Laps
17	992 Pro	909	(Netherlands) Red Camel-Jordans.nl	(Netherlands) Luc Breukers (Netherlands) Rik Breukers (Switzerland) Fabian Denz (Netherlands) Ivo Breukers	Porsche 992 GT3 Cup	348	+68 Laps
17	992 Pro	909	(Netherlands) Red Camel-Jordans.nl	(Netherlands) Luc Breukers (Netherlands) Rik Breukers (Switzerland) Fabian Denz (Netherlands) Ivo Breukers	Porsche 4.0 L Flat-6	348	+68 Laps
18	**GTX**	**701**	**(France) Vortex V8**	**(France) Lionel Amrouche** **(France) Philippe Bonnel** **(France) Cyril Calmon**	**Vortex 2.0**	**317**	**+98 Laps**
18	**GTX**	**701**	**(France) Vortex V8**	**(France) Lionel Amrouche** **(France) Philippe Bonnel** **(France) Cyril Calmon**	**Chevrolet LS3 6.2 L V8**	**317**	**+98 Laps**
19 DNF	992 Pro	921	(Belgium) Mühlner Motorsport	(Estonia) Martin Rump (Latvia) Valters Zviedris (El Salvador) Rolando Saca	Porsche 992 GT3 Cup	300	Contact damage
19 DNF	992 Pro	921	(Belgium) Mühlner Motorsport	(Estonia) Martin Rump (Latvia) Valters Zviedris (El Salvador) Rolando Saca	Porsche 4.0 L Flat-6	300	Contact damage
20	GT3 Am	65	(Malaysia) Viper Niza Racing	(Malaysia) Dominic Ang (Malaysia) Douglas Khoo (Malaysia) Melvin Moh	Mercedes-AMG GT3 Evo	258	Did not finish
20	GT3 Am	65	(Malaysia) Viper Niza Racing	(Malaysia) Dominic Ang (Malaysia) Douglas Khoo (Malaysia) Melvin Moh	Mercedes-AMG M159 6.2 L V8	258	Did not finish
21	GT3 Am	90	(Spain) E2P Racing	(Spain) Pablo Burguera (Spain) Oliver Campos (Spain) Antonio Sainero	Aston Martin Vantage AMR GT3 Evo	111	Did not finish
21	GT3 Am	90	(Spain) E2P Racing	(Spain) Pablo Burguera (Spain) Oliver Campos (Spain) Antonio Sainero	Aston Martin M177 4.0 L Twin-Turbo V8	111	Did not finish

==== Fastest lap ====
Class	No.	Entrant	Driver	Time
GT3	73	(Germany) Proton Huber Competition	(Austria) Klaus Bachler	1:32.493
GTX	701	(France) Vortex V8	(France) Lionel Amrouche	1:38.482
992	925	(Netherlands) Van Berlo Motorsport by Bas Koeten Racing	(Netherlands) Kay van Berlo	1:35.544
GT4	421	(United Kingdom) Venture Engineering	(United Kingdom) Matthew George	1:39.938

24H Series
Previous race: 12 Hours of Spa-Francorchamps	2025 season	Next race: 12 Hours of Paul Ricard
