= 2021 24 Hours of Barcelona =

The layout of the Circuit de Barcelona-Catalunya.

The 2021 Hankook 24 Hours of Barcelona or 2021 Hankook 24 Hours of Barcelona – Trofeo Fermí Vélez was the 22nd running of the 24 Hours of Barcelona which took place from 3 to 5 September 2021 at the Circuit de Barcelona-Catalunya. It was also the fifth round of the 2021 24H GT and TCE Series.

== Schedule ==
Date	Time (local: CEST)	Event	Distance
Friday, 3 September	12:00 – 13:30	Practice (Both classes)	90 mins
Friday, 3 September	17:10 – 17:40	Qualifying – TCE	30 Mins
Friday, 3 September	17:50 – 18:20	Qualifying – GT	30 Mins
Friday, 3 September	21:00 – 22:30	Night practice	90 Mins
Saturday, 4 September	12:00	Race	24 Hours
Sunday, 5 September	12:00	Race	24 Hours

== Entry list ==
32 cars were entered into the event; 24 GT cars and 8 TCEs.

Team	Car	Engine	No.	Drivers
GT3 (9 entries)
(Italy) Dinamic Motorsport	Porsche 911 GT3 R (2019)	Porsche 4.0 L Flat-6	7	(Switzerland) Stefano Monaco (Italy) Amedeo Pampanini (Italy) Roberto Pampanini (Switzerland) Nicolas Stürzinger
(Spain) PCR Sport	Ferrari 458 Italia GT3	Ferrari 4.5 L V8	16	(Spain) Marc Carol Ybarra (Spain) Francesc Gutierrez Agüi (Spain) Josep Mayola Coma
(France) IDEC Sport	Mercedes-AMG GT3 Evo	Mercedes-AMG M159 6.2 L V8	17	(France) Paul-Loup Chatin (France) Patrice Lafargue (France) Paul Lafargue (France) Nicolas Minassian
(Germany) Rutronik Racing by TECE	Audi R8 LMS Evo	Audi 5.2 L V10	18	(Austria) Michael Doppelmayr (Germany) Elia Erhart (Germany) Swen Herberger (Germany) Pierre Kaffer
(Germany) WTM Powered by Phoenix	Ferrari 488 GT3 Evo (2020)	Ferrari 3.9 L Twin-Turbo V8	22	(Germany) Daniel Keilwitz (Germany) Jochen Krumbach (Germany) Georg Weiss (Germany) Leonard Weiss
(Germany) Car Collection Motorsport	Audi R8 LMS Evo	Audi 5.2 L V10	34	(Germany) Stefan Aust (Germany) Gustav Edelhoff (Germany) Elmar Grimm (Germany) Johannes Kirchhoff (Germany) Max Edelhoff
(United States) CP Racing	Mercedes-AMG GT3 Evo	Mercedes-AMG M159 6.2 L V8	85	(United States) Charles Espenlaub (United States) Joe Foster (United States) Shane Lewis (United States) Charles Putman
(Germany) Herberth Motorsport	Porsche 911 GT3 R (2019)	Porsche 4.0 L Flat-6	91	(Switzerland) Daniel Allemann (Germany) Ralf Bohn (Germany) Alfred Renauer (Germany) Robert Renauer
(Germany) Herberth Motorsport	Porsche 911 GT3 R (2019)	Porsche 4.0 L Flat-6	92	(Germany) "Bobby Gonzales" (Germany) Jürgen Häring (Germany) Tim Müller (Germany) Wolfgang Triller (Germany) Marco Seefried
GTX (7 entries)
(France) Vortex V8	Vortex 1.0 GTX	Chevrolet 6.2 L V8	701	(France) Lionel Amrouche (Switzerland) Karen Gaillard (France) Philippe Gruau (France) Franck Leone-Provost
(France) Vortex V8	Vortex 1.0 GTX	Chevrolet 6.2 L V8	712	(France) Philippe Bonnel (France) Boris Gimond (France) Sebastian Lajoux (Switzerland) Nicolas Nobs
(Austria) True Racing	KTM X-Bow GTX Concept	Audi 2.5 L I5	716	(Austria) Reinhard Kofler (Netherlands) Peter Kox (Portugal) Miguel Oliveira (Austria) Ferdinand Stuck
(Austria) True Racing	KTM X-Bow GTX Concept	Audi 2.5 L I5	717	(Austria) Klaus Angerhofer (Netherlands) Peter Kox (Slovakia) Štefan Rosina (Austria) Sehdi Sarmini (Austria) Hubert Trunkenpolz
(Czech Republic) RTR Projects	KTM X-Bow GTX Concept	Audi 2.5 L I5	718	(Czech Republic) Erik Janiš (Czech Republic) Petr Lisa (United Kingdom) JM Littman (Czech Republic) Tomáš Miniberger (Czech Republic) Sergej Pavlovec
(Germany) Reiter Engineering	KTM X-Bow GTX Concept	Audi 2.5 L I5	724	(Austria) Eike Angermayr (Austria) Horst Felbermayr Jr. (Norway) Mads Siljehaug
(Netherlands) Red Camel-Jordans.nl	Porsche 992 GT3 Cup	Porsche 4.0 L Flat-6	999	(Netherlands) Ivo Breukers (Netherlands) Luc Breukers (United Arab Emirates) Bashar Mardini (Netherlands) Thierry Vermeulen
991 (4 entries)
(Luxembourg) DUWO Racing	Porsche 991 GT3 Cup II	Porsche 4.0 L Flat-6	909	(Russia) Andrey Mukovoz (Russia) Sergey Peregudov (Russia) Stanislav Sidoruk
(Italy) Willi Motorsport by Ebimotors	Porsche 991 GT3 Cup II	Porsche 4.0 L Flat-6	955	(Italy) Fabrizio Broggi (Italy) Sabino de Castro (Romania) Sergiu Nicolae
(Belgium) Speed Lover	Porsche 991 GT3 Cup II	Porsche 4.0 L Flat-6	978	(United Kingdom) Ricky Coomber (Belgium) Olivier Dons (United Kingdom) Gavin Pickering
(United Arab Emirates) RABDAN by MRS GT-Racing	Porsche 991 GT3 Cup II	Porsche 4.0 L Flat-6	989	(United Arab Emirates) Saif Alameri (Lithuania) Audrius Butkevicius (Russia) Nikolai Gadetsky (Italy) Nicola Michelon
GT4 (3 entries)
(Canada) ST Racing	BMW M4 GT4	BMW N55 3.0 L Twin-Turbo I6	438	(United States) Chandler Hull (United States) Jon Miller (Canada) Samantha Tan (Canada) Nick Wittmer
(United States) RHC Jorgensen-Strom by Century	BMW M4 GT4	BMW N55 3.0 L Twin-Turbo I6	450	(United Kingdom) Nathan Freke (United States) Daren Jorgensen (United States) Brett Strom (Netherlands) Danny van Dongen
(Germany) Car Collection Motorsport	Audi R8 LMS GT4 Evo	Audi 5.2 L V10	499	(United States) Lisa Clark (United States) Mark Issa (Germany) Martin Lechmann (United States) Jeffrey Westphal
P4 (1 entry)
(Germany) Audi Sport Team Car Collection Motorsport	Audi R8 LMS Evo II	Audi 5.2 L V10	500	(France) Nathanaël Berthon (Germany) Christer Jöns (Germany) Martin Lechmann (Switzerland) Patric Niederhauser
TCR (6 entries)
(Switzerland) Autorama Motorsport by Wolf-Power Racing	Volkswagen Golf GTI TCR	Volkswagen 2.0 L I4	1	(Italy) Roberto Ferri (Norway) Emil Heyerdahl (Austria) Constantin Kletzer (Switzerland) Jasmin Preisig
(Switzerland) Autorama Motorsport by Wolf-Power Racing	Volkswagen Golf GTI TCR	Volkswagen 2.0 L I4	112	(Lithuania) Sigitas Ambrazevicius (Lithuania) Arunas Geciauskas (Lithuania) Vytenis Gulbinas (Netherlands) Paul Sieljes
(Spain) Rail Equip by Totcar Sport	CUPRA León TCR	Volkswagen 2.0 L I4	123	(Spain) Jorge Belloc Diaz (Spain) Jorge Belloc Ruiz (Spain) Álvaro Rodríguez Sastre
(Netherlands) Bas Koeten Racing	CUPRA León TCR	Volkswagen 2.0 L I4	125	(Netherlands) Christiaan Frankenhout (Netherlands) Bert Mets (Netherlands) Bob Stevens (Netherlands) Jos Stevens (Netherlands) Martin van den Berge
(Spain) Baporo Motorsport	CUPRA León TCR	Volkswagen 2.0 L I4	151	(Spain) Llorenç Fluxà Cross (Spain) Llorenç Fluxà Domene (Spain) Manel Lao Cornago (Spain) Manel Lao Gorina
(Belgium) AC Motorsport	Audi RS 3 LMS TCR	Volkswagen 2.0 L I4	188	(Belgium) Mathieu Detry (United Kingdom) James Kaye (France) Stéphane Perrin (Belgium) Vincent Radermecker
TCX (2 entries)
(United States) Team ACP – Tangerine Associates	BMW M2 ClubSport Racing	BMW S55B30T0 3.0 L I6	221	(United States) Catesby Jones (United States) Jim Norman (Belgium) Wim Spinoy
(United Kingdom) CWS Engineering	Ginetta G55 Supercup	Ford Cyclone 3.7 L V6	278	(United States) Jean-Francois Brunot (United Kingdom) Angus Fender (United Kingdom) Ian Stinton (United Kingdom) Colin White

== Results ==
=== Qualifying ===
==== TCE ====
Fastest in class in bold.

Pos.	Class	No.	Team	Time
1	**TCX**	**278**	**(United Kingdom) CWS Engineering**	**1:55.962**
2	**TCR**	**188**	**(Belgium) AC Motorsport**	**1:56.867**
3	TCR	1	(Switzerland) Autorama Motorsport by Wolf-Power Racing	1:56.959
4	TCR	112	(Switzerland) Autorama Motorsport by Wolf-Power Racing	1:57.856
5	TCR	123	(Spain) Rail Equip by Totcar Sport	1:58.716
6	TCR	151	(Spain) Baporo Motorsport	1:58.864
7	TCR	125	(Netherlands) Bas Koeten Racing	2:00.166
8	TCX	221	(United States) Team ACP – Tangerine Associates	2:00.897

==== GT ====
Fastest in class in bold.

Pos.	Class	No.	Team	Time
1	**GT3**	**91**	**(Germany) Herberth Motorsport**	**1:46.587**
2	GT3	22	(Germany) WTM Powered by Phoenix	1:46.740
3	GT3	18	(Germany) Rutronik Racing by TECE	1:47.310
4	GT3	85	(United States) CP Racing	1:47.666
5	GT3	7	(Italy) Dinamic Motorsport	1:47.674
6	GT3	17	(France) IDEC Sport	1:47.730
7	GT3	91	(Germany) Herberth Motorsport	1:47.749
8	GT3	34	(Germany) Car Collection Motorsport	1:48.044
9	GT3	16	(Spain) PCR Sport	1:48.630
10	**GTX**	**718**	**(Czech Republic) RTR Projects**	**1:50.909**
11	GTX	716	(Austria) True Racing	1:50.912
12	**P4**	**500**	**(Germany) Car Collection Motorsport**	**1:51.228**
13	GTX	724	(Germany) Reiter Engineering	1:51.481
14	GTX	999	(Netherlands) Red Camel-Jordans.nl	1:51.908
15	**991**	**955**	**(Romania) Willi Motorsport by Ebimotors**	**1:51.985**
16	GTX	716	(Austria) True Racing	1:52.171
17	GTX	701	(France) Vortex V8	1:53.523
18	GTX	712	(France) Vortex V8	1:53.855
19	991	978	(Belgium) Speed Lover	1:54.002
20	991	989	(United Arab Emirates) RABDAN by MRS GT-Racing	1:55.341
21	**GT4**	**438**	**(Canada) ST Racing**	**1:55.963**
22	GT4	450	(United States) RHC Jorgensen-Strom by Century	1:56.676
23	991	909	(Luxembourg) DUWO Racing	1:57.398
24	GT4	499	(Germany) Car Collection Motorsport	No time

=== Race ===
Class winner in bold.

Pos	Class	No.	Team	Drivers	Chassis	Time/Reason	Laps
Pos	Class	No.	Team	Drivers	Engine	Time/Reason	Laps
1	**GT3**	**91**	**(Germany) Herberth Motorsport**	**(Switzerland) Daniel Allemann (Germany) Ralf Bohn (Germany) Alfred Renauer (Germany) Robert Renauer**	**Porsche 911 GT3 R (2019)**	**24:00 :4.522**	**695**
1	**GT3**	**91**	**(Germany) Herberth Motorsport**	**(Switzerland) Daniel Allemann (Germany) Ralf Bohn (Germany) Alfred Renauer (Germany) Robert Renauer**	**Porsche 4.0 L Flat-6**	**24:00 :4.522**	**695**
2	GT3	92	(Germany) Herberth Motorsport	(Germany) "Bobby Gonzales" (Germany) Jürgen Häring (Germany) Tim Müller (Germany) Wolfgang Triller (Germany) Marco Seefried	Porsche 911 GT3 R (2019)	+6 Laps	689
2	GT3	92	(Germany) Herberth Motorsport	(Germany) "Bobby Gonzales" (Germany) Jürgen Häring (Germany) Tim Müller (Germany) Wolfgang Triller (Germany) Marco Seefried	Porsche 4.0 L Flat-6	+6 Laps	689
3	GT3	18	(Germany) Rutronik Racing by TECE	(Austria) Michael Doppelmayr (Germany) Elia Erhart (Germany) Swen Herberger (Germany) Pierre Kaffer	Audi R8 LMS Evo	+7 Laps	688
3	GT3	18	(Germany) Rutronik Racing by TECE	(Austria) Michael Doppelmayr (Germany) Elia Erhart (Germany) Swen Herberger (Germany) Pierre Kaffer	Audi 5.2 L V10	+7 Laps	688
4	GT3	17	(France) IDEC Sport	(France) Paul-Loup Chatin (France) Patrice Lafargue (France) Paul Lafargue (France) Nicolas Minassian	Mercedes-AMG GT3 Evo	+11 Laps	684
4	GT3	17	(France) IDEC Sport	(France) Paul-Loup Chatin (France) Patrice Lafargue (France) Paul Lafargue (France) Nicolas Minassian	Mercedes-AMG M159 6.2 L V8	+11 Laps	684
5	**P4**	**500**	**(Germany) Car Collection Motorsport**	**(France) Nathanaël Berthon (Germany) Christer Joens (Germany) Martin Lechmann (Switzerland) Patric Niederhauser**	**Audi R8 LMS Evo II**	**+11 Laps**	**684**
5	**P4**	**500**	**(Germany) Car Collection Motorsport**	**(France) Nathanaël Berthon (Germany) Christer Joens (Germany) Martin Lechmann (Switzerland) Patric Niederhauser**	**Audi 5.2 L V10**	**+11 Laps**	**684**
6	GT3	34	(Germany) Car Collection Motorsport	(Germany) Stefan Aust (Germany) Gustav Edelhoff (Germany) Elmar Grimm (Germany) Johannes Kirchhoff (Germany) Max Edelhoff	Audi R8 LMS Evo	+22 Laps	673
6	GT3	34	(Germany) Car Collection Motorsport	(Germany) Stefan Aust (Germany) Gustav Edelhoff (Germany) Elmar Grimm (Germany) Johannes Kirchhoff (Germany) Max Edelhoff	Audi 5.2 L V10	+22 Laps	673
7	**GTX**	**724**	**(Germany) Reiter Engineering**	**(Austria) Eike Angermayr (Austria) Horst Felbermayr Jr. (Norway) Mads Siljehaug**	**KTM X-Bow GTX Concept**	**+29 Laps**	**666**
7	**GTX**	**724**	**(Germany) Reiter Engineering**	**(Austria) Eike Angermayr (Austria) Horst Felbermayr Jr. (Norway) Mads Siljehaug**	**Audi 2.5 L I5**	**+29 Laps**	**666**
8	**991**	**955**	**(Romania) Willi Motorsport by Ebimotors**	**(Italy) Fabrizio Broggi (Italy) Sabino de Castro (Romania) Sergiu Nicolae**	**Porsche 991 GT3 II Cup**	**+33 Laps**	**662**
8	**991**	**955**	**(Romania) Willi Motorsport by Ebimotors**	**(Italy) Fabrizio Broggi (Italy) Sabino de Castro (Romania) Sergiu Nicolae**	**Porsche 4.0 L Flat-6**	**+33 Laps**	**662**
9	GT3	85	(United States) CP Racing	(United States) Charles Espenlaub (United States) Joe Foster (United States) Shane Lewis (United States) Charles Putman	Mercedes-AMG GT3 Evo	+42 Laps	653
9	GT3	85	(United States) CP Racing	(United States) Charles Espenlaub (United States) Joe Foster (United States) Shane Lewis (United States) Charles Putman	Mercedes-AMG M159 6.2 L V8	+42 Laps	653
10	GTX	716	(Austria) True Racing	(Austria) Reinhard Kofler (Netherlands) Peter Kox (Portugal) Miguel Oliveira (Austria) Ferdinand Stuck	KTM X-Bow GTX Concept	+48 Laps	647
10	GTX	716	(Austria) True Racing	(Austria) Reinhard Kofler (Netherlands) Peter Kox (Portugal) Miguel Oliveira (Austria) Ferdinand Stuck	Audi 2.5 L I5	+48 Laps	647
11	991	909	(Luxembourg) DUWO Racing	(Russia) Andrey Mukovoz (Russia) Sergey Peregudov (Russia) Stanislav Sidoruk	Porsche 991 GT3 II Cup	+52 Laps	643
11	991	909	(Luxembourg) DUWO Racing	(Russia) Andrey Mukovoz (Russia) Sergey Peregudov (Russia) Stanislav Sidoruk	Porsche 4.0 L Flat-6	+52 Laps	643
12	**GT4**	**438**	**(Canada) ST Racing**	**(United States) Chandler Hull (United States) Jon Miller (Canada) Samantha Tan (Canada) Nick Wittmer**	**BMW M4 GT4**	**+57 Laps**	**638**
12	**GT4**	**438**	**(Canada) ST Racing**	**(United States) Chandler Hull (United States) Jon Miller (Canada) Samantha Tan (Canada) Nick Wittmer**	**BMW N55 3.0 L Twin-Turbo I6**	**+57 Laps**	**638**
13	**TCR**	**112**	**(Switzerland) Autorama Motorsport by Wolf-Power Racing**	**(Lithuania) Sigitas Ambrazevicius (Lithuania) Arunas Geciauskas (Lithuania) Vytenis Gulbinas (Netherlands) Paul Sieljes**	**Volkswagen Golf GTI TCR**	**+57 Laps**	**638**
13	**TCR**	**112**	**(Switzerland) Autorama Motorsport by Wolf-Power Racing**	**(Lithuania) Sigitas Ambrazevicius (Lithuania) Arunas Geciauskas (Lithuania) Vytenis Gulbinas (Netherlands) Paul Sieljes**	**Volkswagen 2.0 L I4**	**+57 Laps**	**638**
14	TCR	1	(Switzerland) Autorama Motorsport by Wolf-Power Racing	(Italy) Roberto Ferri (Norway) Emil Heyerdahl (Austria) Constantin Kletzer (Switzerland) Jasmin Preisig	Volkswagen Golf GTI TCR	+57 Laps	638
14	TCR	1	(Switzerland) Autorama Motorsport by Wolf-Power Racing	(Italy) Roberto Ferri (Norway) Emil Heyerdahl (Austria) Constantin Kletzer (Switzerland) Jasmin Preisig	Volkswagen 2.0 L I4	+57 Laps	638
15	GTX	999	(Netherlands) Red Camel-Jordans.nl	(Netherlands) Ivo Breukers (Netherlands) Luc Breukers (United Arab Emirates) Bashar Mardini (Netherlands) Thierry Vermeulen	Porsche 992 GT3 Cup	+66 Laps	629
15	GTX	999	(Netherlands) Red Camel-Jordans.nl	(Netherlands) Ivo Breukers (Netherlands) Luc Breukers (United Arab Emirates) Bashar Mardini (Netherlands) Thierry Vermeulen	Porsche 4.0 L Flat-6	+66 Laps	629
16	TCR	123	(Spain) Rail Equip by Totcar Sport	(Spain) Jorge Belloc Diaz (Spain) Jorge Belloc Ruiz (Spain) Álvaro Rodríguez Sastre	CUPRA León TCR	+71 Laps	624
16	TCR	123	(Spain) Rail Equip by Totcar Sport	(Spain) Jorge Belloc Diaz (Spain) Jorge Belloc Ruiz (Spain) Álvaro Rodríguez Sastre	Volkswagen 2.0 L I4	+71 Laps	624
17	GT4	450	(United States) RHC Jorgensen-Strom by Century	(United Kingdom) Nathan Freke (United States) Daren Jorgensen (United States) Brett Strom (Netherlands) Danny van Dongen	BMW M4 GT4	+71 Laps	624
17	GT4	450	(United States) RHC Jorgensen-Strom by Century	(United Kingdom) Nathan Freke (United States) Daren Jorgensen (United States) Brett Strom (Netherlands) Danny van Dongen	BMW N55 3.0 L Twin-Turbo I6	+71 Laps	624
18	TCR	151	(Spain) Baporo Motorsport	(Spain) Cross Llorenç Fluxa (Spain) Domene Llorenç Fluxa (Spain) Cornago Manel Lao (Spain) Gorina Manel Lao	CUPRA León TCR	+76 Laps	619
18	TCR	151	(Spain) Baporo Motorsport	(Spain) Cross Llorenç Fluxa (Spain) Domene Llorenç Fluxa (Spain) Cornago Manel Lao (Spain) Gorina Manel Lao	Volkswagen 2.0 L I4	+76 Laps	619
19	**TCX**	**278**	**(United Kingdom) CWS Engineering**	**(United States) Jean-Francois Brunot (United Kingdom) Angus Fender (United Kingdom) Ian Stinton (United Kingdom) Colin White**	**Ginetta G55 Supercup**	**+75 Laps**	**618**
19	**TCX**	**278**	**(United Kingdom) CWS Engineering**	**(United States) Jean-Francois Brunot (United Kingdom) Angus Fender (United Kingdom) Ian Stinton (United Kingdom) Colin White**	**Ford Cyclone 3.7 L V6**	**+75 Laps**	**618**
20	GTX	717	(Austria) True Racing	(Austria) Klaus Angerhofer (Netherlands) Peter Kox (Slovakia) Štefan Rosina (Austria) Sehdi Sarmini (Austria) Hubert Trunkenpolz	KTM X-Bow GTX Concept	+112 Laps	583
20	GTX	717	(Austria) True Racing	(Austria) Klaus Angerhofer (Netherlands) Peter Kox (Slovakia) Štefan Rosina (Austria) Sehdi Sarmini (Austria) Hubert Trunkenpolz	Audi 2.5 L I5	+112 Laps	583
21	GTX	701	(France) Vortex V8	(France) Lionel Amrouche (Switzerland) Karen Gaillard (France) Philippe Gruau (France) Franck Leone-Provost	Vortex 1.0 GTX	+135 Laps	560
21	GTX	701	(France) Vortex V8	(France) Lionel Amrouche (Switzerland) Karen Gaillard (France) Philippe Gruau (France) Franck Leone-Provost	Chevrolet 6.2 L V8	+135 Laps	560
22	GTX	712	(France) Vortex V8	(France) Philippe Bonnel (France) Boris Gimond (France) Sebastian Lajoux (Switzerland) Nicolas Nobs	Vortex 1.0 GTX	+141 Laps	554
22	GTX	712	(France) Vortex V8	(France) Philippe Bonnel (France) Boris Gimond (France) Sebastian Lajoux (Switzerland) Nicolas Nobs	Chevrolet 6.2 L V8	+141 Laps	554
23	TCR	188	(Belgium) AC Motorsport	(Belgium) Mathieu Detry (United Kingdom) James Kaye (France) Stéphane Perrin (Belgium) Vincent Radermecker	Audi RS 3 LMS TCR	+144 Laps	551
23	TCR	188	(Belgium) AC Motorsport	(Belgium) Mathieu Detry (United Kingdom) James Kaye (France) Stéphane Perrin (Belgium) Vincent Radermecker	Volkswagen 2.0 L I4	+144 Laps	551
24	GT4	499	(Germany) Car Collection Motorsport	(United States) Lisa Clark (United States) Mark Issa (Germany) Martin Lechmann (United States) Jeffrey Westphal	Audi R8 LMS GT4 Evo	+144 Laps	551
24	GT4	499	(Germany) Car Collection Motorsport	(United States) Lisa Clark (United States) Mark Issa (Germany) Martin Lechmann (United States) Jeffrey Westphal	Audi 5.2 L V10	+144 Laps	551
25	991	978	(Belgium) Speed Lover	(United Kingdom) Ricky Coomber (Belgium) Olivier Dons (United Kingdom) Gavin Pickering	Porsche 991 GT3 II Cup	+288 Laps	407
25	991	978	(Belgium) Speed Lover	(United Kingdom) Ricky Coomber (Belgium) Olivier Dons (United Kingdom) Gavin Pickering	Porsche 4.0 L Flat-6	+288 Laps	407
DNF	GT3	7	(Italy) Dinamic Motorsport	(Switzerland) Stefano Monaco (Italy) Amedeo Pampanini (Italy) Roberto Pampanini (Switzerland) Nicolas Stürzinger	Porsche 911 GT3 R	Radiator	377
DNF	GT3	7	(Italy) Dinamic Motorsport	(Switzerland) Stefano Monaco (Italy) Amedeo Pampanini (Italy) Roberto Pampanini (Switzerland) Nicolas Stürzinger	Porsche 4.0 L Flat-6	Radiator	377
DNF	GT3	22	(Germany) WTM Powered by Phoenix	(Germany) Daniel Keilwitz (Germany) Jochen Krumbach (Germany) Georg Weiss (Germany) Leonard Weiss	Ferrari 488 GT3	Gearbox	377
DNF	GT3	22	(Germany) WTM Powered by Phoenix	(Germany) Daniel Keilwitz (Germany) Jochen Krumbach (Germany) Georg Weiss (Germany) Leonard Weiss	Ferrari 3.9 L Twin-Turbo V8	Gearbox	377
DNF	GTX	718	(Czech Republic) RTR Projects	(Czech Republic) Erik Janiš (Czech Republic) Petr Lisa (United Kingdom) JM Littman (Czech Republic) Tomáš Miniberger (Czech Republic) Sergej Pavlovec	KTM X-Bow GTX Concept	Collision damage	342
DNF	GTX	718	(Czech Republic) RTR Projects	(Czech Republic) Erik Janiš (Czech Republic) Petr Lisa (United Kingdom) JM Littman (Czech Republic) Tomáš Miniberger (Czech Republic) Sergej Pavlovec	Audi 2.5 L I5	Collision damage	342
DNF	TCR	125	(Netherlands) Bas Koeten Racing	(Netherlands) Christiaan Frankenhout (Netherlands) Bert Mets (Netherlands) Bob Stevens (Netherlands) Jos Stevens (Netherlands) Martin van den Berge	CUPRA León TCR	Crash	289
DNF	TCR	125	(Netherlands) Bas Koeten Racing	(Netherlands) Christiaan Frankenhout (Netherlands) Bert Mets (Netherlands) Bob Stevens (Netherlands) Jos Stevens (Netherlands) Martin van den Berge	Volkswagen 2.0 L I4	Crash	289
DNF	991	989	(United Arab Emirates) RABDAN by MRS GT-Racing	(United Arab Emirates) Saif Alameri (Lithuania) Audrius Butkevicius (Russia) Nikolai Gadetsky (Italy) Nicola Michelon	Porsche 991 GT3 Cup II	Crash	263
DNF	991	989	(United Arab Emirates) RABDAN by MRS GT-Racing	(United Arab Emirates) Saif Alameri (Lithuania) Audrius Butkevicius (Russia) Nikolai Gadetsky (Italy) Nicola Michelon	Porsche 4.0 L Flat-6	Crash	263
DNF	TCX	221	(United States) Team ACP – Tangerine Associates	(United States) Catesby Jones (United States) Jim Norman (Belgium) Wim Spinoy	BMW M2 ClubSport Racing	Engine	180
DNF	TCX	221	(United States) Team ACP – Tangerine Associates	(United States) Catesby Jones (United States) Jim Norman (Belgium) Wim Spinoy	BMW S55B30T0 3.0 L I6	Engine	180
DNF	GT3	16	(Spain) PCR Sport	(Spain) Marc Carol Ybarra (Spain) Francesc Gutierrez Agüi (Spain) Josep Mayola Coma	Ferrari 488 GT3	Crash	16
DNF	GT3	16	(Spain) PCR Sport	(Spain) Marc Carol Ybarra (Spain) Francesc Gutierrez Agüi (Spain) Josep Mayola Coma	Ferrari 3.9 L Twin-Turbo V8	Crash	16

24H GT Series
Previous race: 12 Hours of Hockenheimring	2021 season	Next race: 12 Hours of Hungary

24H TCE Series
Previous race: 12 Hours of Hockenheimring	2021 season	Next race: 12 Hours of Hungary
