= 2021 24H GT Series =

Motorsport season

The 2021 24H GT Series powered by Hankook was the seventh season of the 24H Series with drivers battling for championship points and titles and the twelfth season since Creventic, the organiser and promoter of the series, organised multiple races a year. The races were contested with GT3-spec cars, GT4-spec cars, sports cars and 24H-Specials, like silhouette cars.

== Calendar ==
Round	Event	Circuit	Date
1	Dubai 24 Hour	Dubai Autodrome, Dubai, United Arab Emirates	15–16 January
NC	6 Hours of Abu Dhabi	Yas Marina Circuit, Abu Dhabi, United Arab Emirates	22-23 January
2	12 Hours of Mugello	Mugello Circuit, Scarperia e San Piero, Italy	26–27 March
3	12 Hours of Circuit Paul Ricard	Circuit Paul Ricard, Le Castellet, France	24 April
4	12 Hours of Hockenheimring	Hockenheimring, Hockenheim, Germany	22–23 May
5	24 Hours of Barcelona	Circuit de Barcelona-Catalunya, Montmeló, Spain	4–5 September
6	12 Hours of Hungary	Hungaroring, Mogyoród, Hungary	2–3 October
7	24 Hours of Sebring	Sebring International Raceway, Sebring, Florida, United States	20–21 November
Cancelled
Event		Circuit	Original Date
12 Hours of Spa-Francorchamps		Circuit de Spa-Francorchamps, Stavelot, Belgium	23–25 April
24 Hours of Portimão		Algarve International Circuit, Portimão, Portugal	16–18 July
Coppa Florio 12 Hours of Sicily		Autodromo di Pergusa, Pergusa, Italy	2–3 October

== Entry list ==
Team	Car	Engine	No.	Drivers	Class	Rounds
GT3
(Netherlands) JR Motorsport	BMW M6 GT3	BMW 4.4 L Turbo V8	2	(Netherlands) Ruud Olij	Am	6
(Netherlands) JR Motorsport	BMW M6 GT3	BMW 4.4 L Turbo V8	2	(Netherlands) Bas Schouten	Am	6
(Netherlands) JR Motorsport	BMW M6 GT3	BMW 4.4 L Turbo V8	2	(Netherlands) Ted van Vliet	Am	6
(Germany) (United Arab Emirates) / Mercedes-AMG Team HRT Bilstein (Note: Car No. 4 entered as Mercedes-AMG Team HRT Bilstein and car No. 5 entered as Mercedes-AMG Team HRT Abu Dhabi Racing.); (Germany) (United Arab Emirates) / Mercedes-AMG Team HRT Abu Dhabi Racing	Mercedes-AMG GT3 Evo	Mercedes-AMG M159 6.2 L V8	4	(Germany) Patrick Assenheimer	P	1
(Germany) (United Arab Emirates) / Mercedes-AMG Team HRT Bilstein; (Germany) (United Arab Emirates) / Mercedes-AMG Team HRT Abu Dhabi Racing	Mercedes-AMG GT3 Evo	Mercedes-AMG M159 6.2 L V8	4	(Germany) Maro Engel	P	1
(Germany) (United Arab Emirates) / Mercedes-AMG Team HRT Bilstein; (Germany) (United Arab Emirates) / Mercedes-AMG Team HRT Abu Dhabi Racing	Mercedes-AMG GT3 Evo	Mercedes-AMG M159 6.2 L V8	4	(Germany) Hubert Haupt	P	1
(Germany) (United Arab Emirates) / Mercedes-AMG Team HRT Bilstein; (Germany) (United Arab Emirates) / Mercedes-AMG Team HRT Abu Dhabi Racing	Mercedes-AMG GT3 Evo	Mercedes-AMG M159 6.2 L V8	4	(United Kingdom) Ryan Ratcliffe	P	1
(Germany) (United Arab Emirates) / Mercedes-AMG Team HRT Bilstein; (Germany) (United Arab Emirates) / Mercedes-AMG Team HRT Abu Dhabi Racing	Mercedes-AMG GT3 Evo	Mercedes-AMG M159 6.2 L V8	4	(United Arab Emirates) Khaled Al Qubaisi	P	1
(Germany) (United Arab Emirates) / Mercedes-AMG Team HRT Bilstein; (Germany) (United Arab Emirates) / Mercedes-AMG Team HRT Abu Dhabi Racing	Mercedes-AMG GT3 Evo	Mercedes-AMG M159 6.2 L V8	5	(United Arab Emirates) Khaled Al Qubaisi	Am	1
(Germany) (United Arab Emirates) / Mercedes-AMG Team HRT Bilstein; (Germany) (United Arab Emirates) / Mercedes-AMG Team HRT Abu Dhabi Racing	Mercedes-AMG GT3 Evo	Mercedes-AMG M159 6.2 L V8	5	(Germany) Patrick Assenheimer	Am	1
(Germany) (United Arab Emirates) / Mercedes-AMG Team HRT Bilstein; (Germany) (United Arab Emirates) / Mercedes-AMG Team HRT Abu Dhabi Racing	Mercedes-AMG GT3 Evo	Mercedes-AMG M159 6.2 L V8	5	(Germany) Nico Bastian	Am	1
(Germany) (United Arab Emirates) / Mercedes-AMG Team HRT Bilstein; (Germany) (United Arab Emirates) / Mercedes-AMG Team HRT Abu Dhabi Racing	Mercedes-AMG GT3 Evo	Mercedes-AMG M159 6.2 L V8	5	(Germany) Valentin Pierburg	Am	1
(Germany) (United Arab Emirates) / Mercedes-AMG Team HRT Bilstein; (Germany) (United Arab Emirates) / Mercedes-AMG Team HRT Abu Dhabi Racing	Mercedes-AMG GT3 Evo	Mercedes-AMG M159 6.2 L V8	5	(Germany) Florian Scholze	Am	1
(Italy) Dinamic Motorsport	Porsche 911 GT3 R	Porsche 4.0 L Flat-6	7	(Italy) Matteo Cairoli	P	1
(Italy) Dinamic Motorsport	Porsche 911 GT3 R	Porsche 4.0 L Flat-6	7	(Switzerland) Mauro Calamia	P	1
(Italy) Dinamic Motorsport	Porsche 911 GT3 R	Porsche 4.0 L Flat-6	7	(Switzerland) Stefano Monaco	P	1
(Italy) Dinamic Motorsport	Porsche 911 GT3 R	Porsche 4.0 L Flat-6	7	(Italy) Roberto Pampanini	P	1
(Italy) Dinamic Motorsport	Porsche 911 GT3 R	Porsche 4.0 L Flat-6	7	(Italy) Roberto Pampanini	Am	2, 5
(Italy) Dinamic Motorsport	Porsche 911 GT3 R	Porsche 4.0 L Flat-6	7	(Switzerland) Mauro Calamia	Am	2, 5
(Italy) Dinamic Motorsport	Porsche 911 GT3 R	Porsche 4.0 L Flat-6	7	(Switzerland) Ivan Jacoma	Am	2
(Italy) Dinamic Motorsport	Porsche 911 GT3 R	Porsche 4.0 L Flat-6	7	(Italy) Amedeo Pampanini	Am	5
(Italy) Dinamic Motorsport	Porsche 911 GT3 R	Porsche 4.0 L Flat-6	7	(Switzerland) Nicolas Stürzinger	Am	5
(Switzerland) Kessel Racing	Ferrari 488 GT3 Evo 2020	Ferrari 3.9 L Twin-Turbo V8	8	(Italy) Alessandro Cutrera	Am	2–3
(Switzerland) Kessel Racing	Ferrari 488 GT3 Evo 2020	Ferrari 3.9 L Twin-Turbo V8	8	(Italy) Leonardo-Maria del Vecchio	Am	2–3
(Switzerland) Kessel Racing	Ferrari 488 GT3 Evo 2020	Ferrari 3.9 L Twin-Turbo V8	8	(Italy) Marco Frezza	Am	2–3
(Switzerland) Kessel Racing	Ferrari 488 GT3 Evo 2020	Ferrari 3.9 L Twin-Turbo V8	8	(Italy) Marco Talarico	Am	2–3
(Switzerland) Kessel Racing	Ferrari 488 GT3 Evo 2020	Ferrari 3.9 L Twin-Turbo V8	8	(Italy) Nicola Cadei	Am	3
(Netherlands) Equipe Verschuur	Renault R.S. 01 F GT3	Nissan VR38DETT 3.0 L V6	9	(Netherlands) Harrie Kolen	Am	2
(Netherlands) Equipe Verschuur	Renault R.S. 01 F GT3	Nissan VR38DETT 3.0 L V6	9	(Netherlands) Erik van Loon	Am	2
(Netherlands) Equipe Verschuur	Renault R.S. 01 F GT3	Nissan VR38DETT 3.0 L V6	9	(Netherlands) Mike Verschuur	Am	2
(Germany) Leipert Motorsport	Lamborghini Huracán GT3 Evo	Lamborghini 5.2 L V10	10	(United States) Tyler Cooke	Am	4, 7
(Germany) Leipert Motorsport	Lamborghini Huracán GT3 Evo	Lamborghini 5.2 L V10	10	(New Zealand) Brendon Leitch	Am	4, 7
(Germany) Leipert Motorsport	Lamborghini Huracán GT3 Evo	Lamborghini 5.2 L V10	10	(United Kingdom) Seb Morris	Am	4, 7
(Germany) Leipert Motorsport	Lamborghini Huracán GT3 Evo	Lamborghini 5.2 L V10	10	(Germany) Fidel Leib	Am	4
(Germany) Leipert Motorsport	Lamborghini Huracán GT3 Evo	Lamborghini 5.2 L V10	10	(Germany) Sebastian Balthasar	Am	7
(Germany) Leipert Motorsport	Lamborghini Huracán GT3 Evo	Lamborghini 5.2 L V10	10	(Germany) Dennis Fetzer	Am	7
(Czech Republic) MiddleCap racing with Scuderia Praha	Ferrari 488 GT3	Ferrari 3.9 L Twin-Turbo V8	11	(Czech Republic) Josef Král	Am	2–4
(Czech Republic) MiddleCap racing with Scuderia Praha	Ferrari 488 GT3	Ferrari 3.9 L Twin-Turbo V8	11	(Slovakia) Matúš Výboh	Am	2–4
(Czech Republic) MiddleCap racing with Scuderia Praha	Ferrari 488 GT3	Ferrari 3.9 L Twin-Turbo V8	11	(Slovakia) Miroslav Výboh	Am	2–3
(Czech Republic) MiddleCap racing with Scuderia Praha	Ferrari 488 GT3	Ferrari 3.9 L Twin-Turbo V8	11	(Czech Republic) Dennis Waszek	Am	4
(Germany) Team Zakspeed	Dodge SRT Viper GT3-R	Viper 8.4 L V10	13	(Russia) Evgeny Kireev	Am	1
(Germany) Team Zakspeed	Dodge SRT Viper GT3-R	Viper 8.4 L V10	13	(Germany) Manuel Lauck	Am	1
(Germany) Team Zakspeed	Dodge SRT Viper GT3-R	Viper 8.4 L V10	13	(Germany) Hendrik Still	Am	1
(Germany) Team Zakspeed	Dodge SRT Viper GT3-R	Viper 8.4 L V10	13	(Russia) Victor Shaytar	Am	1
(Germany) Team Zakspeed	Dodge SRT Viper GT3-R	Viper 8.4 L V10	13	(Russia) Sergey Stolyarov	Am	1
(Germany) Team Zakspeed	Mercedes-AMG GT3 Evo	Mercedes-AMG M159 6.2 L V8	13	(Russia) Sergey Stolyarov	Am	2
(Germany) Team Zakspeed	Mercedes-AMG GT3 Evo	Mercedes-AMG M159 6.2 L V8	13	(Russia) Evgeny Kireev	Am	2
(Germany) Team Zakspeed	Mercedes-AMG GT3 Evo	Mercedes-AMG M159 6.2 L V8	13	(Russia) Victor Shaytar	Am	2
(Spain) PCR Sport	Ferrari 458 Italia GT3	Ferrari 4.5 L V8	16	(Spain) Marc Carol Ybarra	Am	5
(Spain) PCR Sport	Ferrari 458 Italia GT3	Ferrari 4.5 L V8	16	(Spain) Francesc Gutierrez Agüi	Am	5
(Spain) PCR Sport	Ferrari 458 Italia GT3	Ferrari 4.5 L V8	16	(Spain) Josep Mayola Comadira	Am	5
(France) IDEC Sport	Mercedes-AMG GT3 Evo	Mercedes-AMG M159 6.2 L V8	17	(France) Paul-Loup Chatin	Am	5
(France) IDEC Sport	Mercedes-AMG GT3 Evo	Mercedes-AMG M159 6.2 L V8	17	(France) Patrice Lafargue	Am	5
(France) IDEC Sport	Mercedes-AMG GT3 Evo	Mercedes-AMG M159 6.2 L V8	17	(France) Paul Lafargue	Am	5
(France) IDEC Sport	Mercedes-AMG GT3 Evo	Mercedes-AMG M159 6.2 L V8	17	(France) Nicolas Minassian	Am	5
(Germany) Rutronik Racing by TECE	Audi R8 LMS Evo	Audi 5.2 L V10	18	(Austria) Michael Doppelmayr	Am	2–7
(Germany) Rutronik Racing by TECE	Audi R8 LMS Evo	Audi 5.2 L V10	18	(Germany) Swen Herberger	Am	2–7
(Germany) Rutronik Racing by TECE	Audi R8 LMS Evo	Audi 5.2 L V10	18	(Germany) Pierre Kaffer	Am	2–6
(Germany) Rutronik Racing by TECE	Audi R8 LMS Evo	Audi 5.2 L V10	18	(Germany) Elia Erhart	Am	2–5, 7
(Germany) Rutronik Racing by TECE	Audi R8 LMS Evo	Audi 5.2 L V10	18	(Germany) Markus Winkelhock	Am	7
(Netherlands) MP Motorsport	Mercedes-AMG GT3	Mercedes-AMG M159 6.2 L V8	19	(Netherlands) Bert de Heus	Am	1
(Netherlands) MP Motorsport	Mercedes-AMG GT3	Mercedes-AMG M159 6.2 L V8	19	(Netherlands) Daniël de Jong	Am	1
(Netherlands) MP Motorsport	Mercedes-AMG GT3	Mercedes-AMG M159 6.2 L V8	19	(Netherlands) Henk de Jong	Am	1
(Netherlands) MP Motorsport	Mercedes-AMG GT3	Mercedes-AMG M159 6.2 L V8	19	(Netherlands) Jaap van Lagen	Am	1
(Germany) SPS automotive performance	Mercedes-AMG GT3 Evo	Mercedes-AMG M159 6.2 L V8	20	(Germany) Steffen Görig	Am	3
(Germany) SPS automotive performance	Mercedes-AMG GT3 Evo	Mercedes-AMG M159 6.2 L V8	20	(Germany) Christian Hook	Am	3
(Germany) SPS automotive performance	Mercedes-AMG GT3 Evo	Mercedes-AMG M159 6.2 L V8	20	(Germany) Valentin Pierburg	Am	3
(Germany) WTM Powered by Phoenix	Ferrari 488 GT3 Evo 2020	Ferrari 3.9 L Twin-Turbo V8	22	(Germany) Daniel Keilwitz	Am	5
(Germany) WTM Powered by Phoenix	Ferrari 488 GT3 Evo 2020	Ferrari 3.9 L Twin-Turbo V8	22	(Germany) Jochen Krumbach	Am	5
(Germany) WTM Powered by Phoenix	Ferrari 488 GT3 Evo 2020	Ferrari 3.9 L Twin-Turbo V8	22	(Germany) Georg Weiss	Am	5
(Germany) WTM Powered by Phoenix	Ferrari 488 GT3 Evo 2020	Ferrari 3.9 L Twin-Turbo V8	22	(Germany) Leonard Weiss	Am	5
(Germany) WTM Powered by Phoenix	Ferrari 488 GT3 Evo 2020	Ferrari 3.9 L Twin-Turbo V8	22	(Germany) Hendrik Still	Am	5
(Germany) Hella Pagid - racing one	Ferrari 488 GT3	Ferrari 3.9 L Twin-Turbo V8	30	(Italy) Daniele Di Amato	Am	2
(Germany) Hella Pagid - racing one	Ferrari 488 GT3	Ferrari 3.9 L Twin-Turbo V8	30	(Germany) Francesco Lopez	Am	2
(Germany) Hella Pagid - racing one	Ferrari 488 GT3	Ferrari 3.9 L Twin-Turbo V8	30	(Germany) Axel Sartingen	Am	2
(Germany) Hella Pagid - racing one	Ferrari 488 GT3	Ferrari 3.9 L Twin-Turbo V8	30	(Germany) Daniel Schwerfeld	Am	2
(Belgium) Team WRT	Audi R8 LMS Evo	Audi 5.2 L V10	31	(United Kingdom) Frank Bird	P	1
(Belgium) Team WRT	Audi R8 LMS Evo	Audi 5.2 L V10	31	(Germany) Benjamin Goethe	P	1
(Belgium) Team WRT	Audi R8 LMS Evo	Audi 5.2 L V10	31	(Belgium) Louis Machiels	P	1
(Belgium) Team WRT	Audi R8 LMS Evo	Audi 5.2 L V10	31	(South Africa) Kelvin van der Linde	P	1
(Belgium) Team WRT	Audi R8 LMS Evo	Audi 5.2 L V10	31	(Belgium) Dries Vanthoor	P	1
(Germany) Car Collection Motorsport	Audi R8 LMS Evo	Audi 5.2 L V10	34	(Germany) Gustav Edelhoff	Am	1–2, 4–5
(Germany) Car Collection Motorsport	Audi R8 LMS Evo	Audi 5.2 L V10	34	(Germany) Elmar Grimm	Am	1–2, 4–5
(Germany) Car Collection Motorsport	Audi R8 LMS Evo	Audi 5.2 L V10	34	(Germany) Johannes Dr. Kirchhoff	Am	1–2, 5
(Germany) Car Collection Motorsport	Audi R8 LMS Evo	Audi 5.2 L V10	34	(Germany) Max Edelhoff	Am	1, 4–5
(Germany) Car Collection Motorsport	Audi R8 LMS Evo	Audi 5.2 L V10	34	(Germany) Stefan Aust	Am	5
(Germany) Car Collection Motorsport	Audi R8 LMS Evo	Audi 5.2 L V10	88	(Netherlands) Milan Dontje	Am	1, 3
(Germany) Car Collection Motorsport	Audi R8 LMS Evo	Audi 5.2 L V10	88	(Germany) Tim Müller	Am	1, 3
(Germany) Car Collection Motorsport	Audi R8 LMS Evo	Audi 5.2 L V10	88	(Germany) Martin Lechmann	Am	1, 4
(Germany) Car Collection Motorsport	Audi R8 LMS Evo	Audi 5.2 L V10	88	(Denmark) Kim Holmgaard	Am	1
(Germany) Car Collection Motorsport	Audi R8 LMS Evo	Audi 5.2 L V10	88	(Germany) Johannes Stengel	Am	1
(Germany) Car Collection Motorsport	Audi R8 LMS Evo	Audi 5.2 L V10	88	(Belgium) Pierre-Yves Paque	Am	3–4
(Germany) Car Collection Motorsport	Audi R8 LMS Evo	Audi 5.2 L V10	88	(Poland) Robin Rogalski	Am	3
(Germany) Car Collection Motorsport	Audi R8 LMS Evo	Audi 5.2 L V10	88	(Germany) Christian Kranenberg	Am	4
(Germany) Car Collection Motorsport	Audi R8 LMS Evo	Audi 5.2 L V10	88	(United States) Vincent Piemonte	Am	4
(United Arab Emirates) GPX Racing	Porsche 911 GT3 R	Porsche 4.0 L Flat-6	36	(France) Julien Andlauer	P	1
(United Arab Emirates) GPX Racing	Porsche 911 GT3 R	Porsche 4.0 L Flat-6	36	(United Arab Emirates) Frédéric Fatien	P	1
(United Arab Emirates) GPX Racing	Porsche 911 GT3 R	Porsche 4.0 L Flat-6	36	(France) Alain Ferté	P	1
(United Arab Emirates) GPX Racing	Porsche 911 GT3 R	Porsche 4.0 L Flat-6	36	(France) Mathieu Jaminet	P	1
(United Arab Emirates) GPX Racing	Porsche 911 GT3 R	Porsche 4.0 L Flat-6	36	(Zimbabwe) Axcil Jefferies	P	1
(Italy) MP Racing	Mercedes-AMG GT3 Evo	Mercedes-AMG M159 6.2 L V8	58	(Italy) Corinna Gostner	Am	2–4, 6
(Italy) MP Racing	Mercedes-AMG GT3 Evo	Mercedes-AMG M159 6.2 L V8	58	(Italy) David Gostner	Am	2–4, 6
(Italy) MP Racing	Mercedes-AMG GT3 Evo	Mercedes-AMG M159 6.2 L V8	58	(Italy) Thomas Gostner	Am	2–4, 6
(Italy) MP Racing	Mercedes-AMG GT3 Evo	Mercedes-AMG M159 6.2 L V8	58	(Italy) Manuela Gostner	Am	2
(Italy) MP Racing	Mercedes-AMG GT3 Evo	Mercedes-AMG M159 6.2 L V8	58	(Italy) Giorgio Sernagiotto	Am	2
(Austria) GRT Grasser Racing Team	Lamborghini Huracán GT3 Evo	Lamborghini 5.2 L V10	63	(Switzerland) Adrian Amstutz	P	1
(Austria) GRT Grasser Racing Team	Lamborghini Huracán GT3 Evo	Lamborghini 5.2 L V10	63	(Italy) Mirko Bortolotti	P	1
(Austria) GRT Grasser Racing Team	Lamborghini Huracán GT3 Evo	Lamborghini 5.2 L V10	63	(Netherlands) Rik Breukers	P	1
(Austria) GRT Grasser Racing Team	Lamborghini Huracán GT3 Evo	Lamborghini 5.2 L V10	63	(Switzerland) Rolf Ineichen	P	1
(Switzerland) Haegeli by T2 Racing	Porsche 911 GT3 R	Porsche 4.0 L Flat-6	66	(Germany) Marc Basseng	Am	2, 4
(Switzerland) Haegeli by T2 Racing	Porsche 911 GT3 R	Porsche 4.0 L Flat-6	66	(Switzerland) Pieder Decurtins	Am	2, 4
(Switzerland) Haegeli by T2 Racing	Porsche 911 GT3 R	Porsche 4.0 L Flat-6	66	(Germany) Manuel Lauck	Am	2, 4
(United Kingdom) Inception Racing with Optimum Motorsport	McLaren 720S GT3	McLaren M840T 4.0 L Turbo V8	72	(United States) Brendan Iribe	Am	1
(United Kingdom) Inception Racing with Optimum Motorsport	McLaren 720S GT3	McLaren M840T 4.0 L Turbo V8	72	(United Kingdom) Ollie Millroy	Am	1
(United Kingdom) Inception Racing with Optimum Motorsport	McLaren 720S GT3	McLaren M840T 4.0 L Turbo V8	72	(United Kingdom) Nick Moss	Am	1
(United Kingdom) Inception Racing with Optimum Motorsport	McLaren 720S GT3	McLaren M840T 4.0 L Turbo V8	72	(United Kingdom) Joe Osborne	Am	1
(France) Racetivity	Mercedes-AMG GT3 Evo	Mercedes-AMG M159 6.2 L V8	83	(France) Emmanuel Collard	P	1
(France) Racetivity	Mercedes-AMG GT3 Evo	Mercedes-AMG M159 6.2 L V8	83	(France) François Perrodo	P	1
(France) Racetivity	Mercedes-AMG GT3 Evo	Mercedes-AMG M159 6.2 L V8	83	(France) Charles-Henri Samani	P	1
(France) Racetivity	Mercedes-AMG GT3 Evo	Mercedes-AMG M159 6.2 L V8	83	(France) Matthieu Vaxivière	P	1
(United States) CP Racing	Mercedes-AMG GT3 Evo	Mercedes-AMG M159 6.2 L V8	85	(United States) Charles Espenlaub	Am	1–2, 4–7
(United States) CP Racing	Mercedes-AMG GT3 Evo	Mercedes-AMG M159 6.2 L V8	85	(United States) Joe Foster	Am	1–2, 4–7
(United States) CP Racing	Mercedes-AMG GT3 Evo	Mercedes-AMG M159 6.2 L V8	85	(United States) Shane Lewis	Am	1–2, 4–7
(United States) CP Racing	Mercedes-AMG GT3 Evo	Mercedes-AMG M159 6.2 L V8	85	(United States) Charles Putman	Am	1–2, 4–7
(Germany) Herberth Motorsport	Porsche 911 GT3 R	Porsche 4.0 L Flat-6	91	(Switzerland) Daniel Allemann	Am	1–3, 5–7
(Germany) Herberth Motorsport	Porsche 911 GT3 R	Porsche 4.0 L Flat-6	91	(Germany) Ralf Bohn	Am	1–3, 5–7
(Germany) Herberth Motorsport	Porsche 911 GT3 R	Porsche 4.0 L Flat-6	91	(Germany) Alfred Renauer	Am	1–3, 5–7
(Germany) Herberth Motorsport	Porsche 911 GT3 R	Porsche 4.0 L Flat-6	91	(Germany) Robert Renauer	Am	1–3, 5, 7
(Germany) Herberth Motorsport	Porsche 911 GT3 R	Porsche 4.0 L Flat-6	92	(Germany) Jürgen Häring	P	1
(Germany) Herberth Motorsport	Porsche 911 GT3 R	Porsche 4.0 L Flat-6	92	(Austria) Klaus Bachler	P	1
(Germany) Herberth Motorsport	Porsche 911 GT3 R	Porsche 4.0 L Flat-6	92	(Germany) Vincent Kolb	P	1
(Germany) Herberth Motorsport	Porsche 911 GT3 R	Porsche 4.0 L Flat-6	92	(Germany) Sven Müller	P	1
(Germany) Herberth Motorsport	Porsche 911 GT3 R	Porsche 4.0 L Flat-6	92	(Germany) Wolfgang Triller	P	1
(Germany) Herberth Motorsport	Porsche 911 GT3 R	Porsche 4.0 L Flat-6	92	(Germany) "Bobby Gonzales"	Am	2–3, 5–7
(Germany) Herberth Motorsport	Porsche 911 GT3 R	Porsche 4.0 L Flat-6	92	(Germany) Jürgen Häring	Am	2–3, 5–7
(Germany) Herberth Motorsport	Porsche 911 GT3 R	Porsche 4.0 L Flat-6	92	(Germany) Marco Seefried	Am	2–3, 5–7
(Germany) Herberth Motorsport	Porsche 911 GT3 R	Porsche 4.0 L Flat-6	92	(Germany) Stefan Aust	Am	2–3
(Germany) Herberth Motorsport	Porsche 911 GT3 R	Porsche 4.0 L Flat-6	92	(Germany) Wolfgang Triller	Am	5, 7
(Germany) Herberth Motorsport	Porsche 911 GT3 R	Porsche 4.0 L Flat-6	92	(Germany) Tim Müller	Am	5
(Germany) Herberth Motorsport	Porsche 911 GT3 R	Porsche 4.0 L Flat-6	92	(Switzerland) Daniel Allemann	Am	6
(Germany) Herberth Motorsport	Porsche 911 GT3 R	Porsche 4.0 L Flat-6	92	(Germany) Felix Neuhofer	Am	7
(Germany) Herberth Motorsport	Porsche 911 GT3 R	Porsche 4.0 L Flat-6	93	(Hong Kong) Antares Au	Am	1
(Germany) Herberth Motorsport	Porsche 911 GT3 R	Porsche 4.0 L Flat-6	93	(Germany) Steffen Görig	Am	1
(Germany) Herberth Motorsport	Porsche 911 GT3 R	Porsche 4.0 L Flat-6	93	(United Kingdom) Daniel Lloyd	Am	1
(Germany) Herberth Motorsport	Porsche 911 GT3 R	Porsche 4.0 L Flat-6	93	(United Kingdom) Ian Loggie	Am	1
(Germany) Herberth Motorsport	Ferrari 488 GT3 Evo 2020	Ferrari 3.9 L Twin-Turbo V8	92	(Germany) "Bobby Gonzales"	Am	4
(Germany) Herberth Motorsport	Ferrari 488 GT3 Evo 2020	Ferrari 3.9 L Twin-Turbo V8	92	(Germany) Jürgen Häring	Am	4
(Germany) Herberth Motorsport	Ferrari 488 GT3 Evo 2020	Ferrari 3.9 L Twin-Turbo V8	92	(Germany) Tim Müller	Am	4
(Germany) Herberth Motorsport	Ferrari 488 GT3 Evo 2020	Ferrari 3.9 L Twin-Turbo V8	92	(Germany) Alfred Renauer	Am	4
(Germany) Attempto Racing	Audi R8 LMS Evo	Audi 5.2 L V10	99	(Germany) Alex Aka	P	1
(Germany) Attempto Racing	Audi R8 LMS Evo	Audi 5.2 L V10	99	(United Kingdom) Finlay Hutchison	P	1
(Germany) Attempto Racing	Audi R8 LMS Evo	Audi 5.2 L V10	99	(Germany) Christopher Mies	P	1
(Germany) Attempto Racing	Audi R8 LMS Evo	Audi 5.2 L V10	99	(Austria) Philipp Sager	P	1
(Germany) Attempto Racing	Audi R8 LMS Evo	Audi 5.2 L V10	99	(Germany) Markus Winkelhock	P	1
GTX
(France) Vortex V8	Vortex 1.0 GTX	Chevrolet 6.2 L V8	701	(France) Lionel Amrouche	1–2, 5	
(France) Vortex V8	Vortex 1.0 GTX	Chevrolet 6.2 L V8	701	(Switzerland) Karen Gaillard	1–2, 5	
(France) Vortex V8	Vortex 1.0 GTX	Chevrolet 6.2 L V8	701	(France) Philippe Bonnel	1, 4, 6–7	
(France) Vortex V8	Vortex 1.0 GTX	Chevrolet 6.2 L V8	701	(France) Alban Varutti	1	
(France) Vortex V8	Vortex 1.0 GTX	Chevrolet 6.2 L V8	701	(France) Boris Gimond	2, 7	
(France) Vortex V8	Vortex 1.0 GTX	Chevrolet 6.2 L V8	701	(France) Bastien Gouret	3–4	
(France) Vortex V8	Vortex 1.0 GTX	Chevrolet 6.2 L V8	701	(France) Philippe Gruau	3, 5	
(France) Vortex V8	Vortex 1.0 GTX	Chevrolet 6.2 L V8	701	(France) Olivier Gomez	3	
(France) Vortex V8	Vortex 1.0 GTX	Chevrolet 6.2 L V8	701	(Switzerland) Nicolas Nobs	4, 6	
(France) Vortex V8	Vortex 1.0 GTX	Chevrolet 6.2 L V8	701	(France) Arnaud Gomez	4	
(France) Vortex V8	Vortex 1.0 GTX	Chevrolet 6.2 L V8	701	(France) Franck Leone-Provost	5	
(France) Vortex V8	Vortex 1.0 GTX	Chevrolet 6.2 L V8	701	(France) Gilles Courtois	6	
(France) Vortex V8	Vortex 1.0 GTX	Chevrolet 6.2 L V8	701	(France) "Steve Brooks"	7	
(France) Vortex V8	Vortex 1.0 GTX	Chevrolet 6.2 L V8	701	(France) Sebastian Lajoux	7	
(France) Vortex V8	Vortex 1.0 GTX	Chevrolet 6.2 L V8	712	(France) Philippe Bonnel	2–3, 5	
(France) Vortex V8	Vortex 1.0 GTX	Chevrolet 6.2 L V8	712	(Switzerland) Nicolas Nobs	2–3, 5	
(France) Vortex V8	Vortex 1.0 GTX	Chevrolet 6.2 L V8	712	(France) Pierre Fontaine	2–3	
(France) Vortex V8	Vortex 1.0 GTX	Chevrolet 6.2 L V8	712	(France) Boris Gimond	5	
(France) Vortex V8	Vortex 1.0 GTX	Chevrolet 6.2 L V8	712	(France) Sebastian Lajoux	5	
(Slovakia) ARC Bratislava	Lamborghini Huracán Super Trofeo	Lamborghini 5.2 L V10	707	(Lithuania) Justas Jonušis	1	
(Slovakia) ARC Bratislava	Lamborghini Huracán Super Trofeo	Lamborghini 5.2 L V10	707	(Slovakia) Mat'o Konôpka	1	
(Slovakia) ARC Bratislava	Lamborghini Huracán Super Trofeo	Lamborghini 5.2 L V10	707	(Slovakia) Miro Konôpka	1	
(Slovakia) ARC Bratislava	Lamborghini Huracán Super Trofeo	Lamborghini 5.2 L V10	707	(Slovakia) Zdeno Mikulasko	1	
(Slovakia) ARC Bratislava	Lamborghini Huracán Super Trofeo	Lamborghini 5.2 L V10	707	(Estonia) Thomas Padovani	1	
GT3 Poland	Lamborghini Huracán Super Trofeo Evo	Lamborghini 5.2 L V10	708	(Poland) Pawel Kowalski	1	
GT3 Poland	Lamborghini Huracán Super Trofeo Evo	Lamborghini 5.2 L V10	708	(Poland) Andrzej Lewandowski	1	
GT3 Poland	Lamborghini Huracán Super Trofeo Evo	Lamborghini 5.2 L V10	708	(Poland) Rafal Mikrut	1	
GT3 Poland	Lamborghini Huracán Super Trofeo Evo	Lamborghini 5.2 L V10	708	(Poland) Grzegorz Moczulski	1	
GT3 Poland	Lamborghini Huracán Super Trofeo Evo	Lamborghini 5.2 L V10	708	(Poland) Bartosz Opiola	1	
(Germany) Leipert Motorsport	Lamborghini Huracán Super Trofeo Evo	Lamborghini 5.2 L V10	710	(United States) Gregg Gorski	1, 7	
(Germany) Leipert Motorsport	Lamborghini Huracán Super Trofeo Evo	Lamborghini 5.2 L V10	710	(United States) Gerhard Watzinger	1, 7	
(Germany) Leipert Motorsport	Lamborghini Huracán Super Trofeo Evo	Lamborghini 5.2 L V10	710	(United States) Oscar Lee	1	
(Germany) Leipert Motorsport	Lamborghini Huracán Super Trofeo Evo	Lamborghini 5.2 L V10	710	(Germany) Fidel Leib	1	
(Germany) Leipert Motorsport	Lamborghini Huracán Super Trofeo Evo	Lamborghini 5.2 L V10	710	(Switzerland) Kurt Thiel	1	
(Germany) Leipert Motorsport	Lamborghini Huracán Super Trofeo Evo	Lamborghini 5.2 L V10	710	(Canada) Ray Calvin	2	
(Germany) Leipert Motorsport	Lamborghini Huracán Super Trofeo Evo	Lamborghini 5.2 L V10	710	(Germany) Matthias Hoffsümmer	2	
(Germany) Leipert Motorsport	Lamborghini Huracán Super Trofeo Evo	Lamborghini 5.2 L V10	710	(Luxembourg) Gabriele Rindone	2	
(Germany) Leipert Motorsport	Lamborghini Huracán Super Trofeo Evo	Lamborghini 5.2 L V10	710	(United States) Lance Bergstein	7	
(Germany) Leipert Motorsport	Lamborghini Huracán Super Trofeo Evo	Lamborghini 5.2 L V10	710	(United States) Kenton Koch	7	
(Germany) Leipert Motorsport	Lamborghini Huracán Super Trofeo Evo	Lamborghini 5.2 L V10	710	(United States) Al Miller	7	
(Austria) True Racing	KTM X-Bow GTX Concept	Audi 2.5 L I5	716	(Austria) Reinhard Kofler	5	
(Austria) True Racing	KTM X-Bow GTX Concept	Audi 2.5 L I5	716	(Netherlands) Peter Kox	5	
(Austria) True Racing	KTM X-Bow GTX Concept	Audi 2.5 L I5	716	(Portugal) Miguel Oliveira	5	
(Austria) True Racing	KTM X-Bow GTX Concept	Audi 2.5 L I5	716	(Austria) Ferdinand Stuck	5	
(Austria) True Racing	KTM X-Bow GTX Concept	Audi 2.5 L I5	717	(Austria) Klaus Angerhofer	5	
(Austria) True Racing	KTM X-Bow GTX Concept	Audi 2.5 L I5	717	(Netherlands) Peter Kox	5	
(Austria) True Racing	KTM X-Bow GTX Concept	Audi 2.5 L I5	717	(Slovakia) Štefan Rosina	5	
(Austria) True Racing	KTM X-Bow GTX Concept	Audi 2.5 L I5	717	(Austria) Sehdi Sarmini	5	
(Austria) True Racing	KTM X-Bow GTX Concept	Audi 2.5 L I5	717	(Austria) Hubert Trunkenpolz	5	
(Czech Republic) RTR Projects	KTM X-Bow GTX Concept	Audi 2.5 L I5	718	(Czech Republic) Erik Janiš	5	
(Czech Republic) RTR Projects	KTM X-Bow GTX Concept	Audi 2.5 L I5	718	(Czech Republic) Petr Lisa	5	
(Czech Republic) RTR Projects	KTM X-Bow GTX Concept	Audi 2.5 L I5	718	(United Kingdom) JM Littman	5	
(Czech Republic) RTR Projects	KTM X-Bow GTX Concept	Audi 2.5 L I5	718	(Czech Republic) Tomáš Miniberger	5	
(Czech Republic) RTR Projects	KTM X-Bow GTX Concept	Audi 2.5 L I5	718	(Czech Republic) Sergej Pavlovec	5	
(Germany) 9und11 Racing	Porsche 991 GT3 Cup MR	Porsche 4.0 L Flat-6	719	(Germany) Georg Goder	4	
(Germany) 9und11 Racing	Porsche 991 GT3 Cup MR	Porsche 4.0 L Flat-6	719	(Germany) Ralf Oehme	4	
(Germany) 9und11 Racing	Porsche 991 GT3 Cup MR	Porsche 4.0 L Flat-6	719	(Germany) Tim Scheerbarth	4	
(Germany) 9und11 Racing	Porsche 991 GT3 Cup MR	Porsche 4.0 L Flat-6	719	(Germany) Martin Schlüter	4	
(Lithuania) Siauliai - RD Signs racing team	Lamborghini Huracán Super Trofeo	Lamborghini 5.2 L V10	720	(Lithuania) Audrius Butkevicius	2	
(Lithuania) Siauliai - RD Signs racing team	Lamborghini Huracán Super Trofeo	Lamborghini 5.2 L V10	720	(Lithuania) Ramunas Capkauskas	2	
(Lithuania) Siauliai - RD Signs racing team	Lamborghini Huracán Super Trofeo	Lamborghini 5.2 L V10	720	(Lithuania) Egidijus Gutaravicius	2	
(Lithuania) Siauliai - RD Signs racing team	Lamborghini Huracán Super Trofeo	Lamborghini 5.2 L V10	720	(Lithuania) Paulius Paskevicius	2	
(Lithuania) Siauliai - RD Signs racing team	Lamborghini Huracán Super Trofeo Evo	Lamborghini 5.2 L V10	720	(Lithuania) Audrius Butkevicius	6	
(Lithuania) Siauliai - RD Signs racing team	Lamborghini Huracán Super Trofeo Evo	Lamborghini 5.2 L V10	720	(Lithuania) Paulius Paskevicius	6	
(Lithuania) Siauliai - RD Signs racing team	Lamborghini Huracán Super Trofeo Evo	Lamborghini 5.2 L V10	720	(Italy) Nicola Michelon	6	
(Germany) Reiter Engineering	KTM X-Bow GTX Concept	Audi 2.5 L I5	724	(Austria) Eike Angermayr	2–5	
(Germany) Reiter Engineering	KTM X-Bow GTX Concept	Audi 2.5 L I5	724	(Norway) Mads Siljehaug	2–5	
(Germany) Reiter Engineering	KTM X-Bow GTX Concept	Audi 2.5 L I5	724	(Austria) Horst Felbermayr Jr.	2–5	
(Germany) Reiter Engineering	KTM X-Bow GTX Concept	Audi 2.5 L I5	724	(United States) Nicolai Elghanayan	2–4	
(Germany) Reiter Engineering	KTM X-Bow GTX Concept	Audi 2.5 L I5	725	(Netherlands) Peter Kox	4	
(Germany) Reiter Engineering	KTM X-Bow GTX Concept	Audi 2.5 L I5	725	(Netherlands) Nico Pronk	4	
(Germany) Reiter Engineering	KTM X-Bow GTX Concept	Audi 2.5 L I5	725	(Netherlands) Dennis Retera	4	
(Italy) Lotus PB Racing	Lotus Exige V6 Cup R	Toyota 3.5 L V6	726	(Italy) Massimo Abbati	2	
(Italy) Lotus PB Racing	Lotus Exige V6 Cup R	Toyota 3.5 L V6	726	(Italy) Stefano D'Aste	2	
(Italy) Lotus PB Racing	Lotus Exige V6 Cup R	Toyota 3.5 L V6	726	(Italy) Daniel Grimaldi	2	
(Italy) Lotus PB Racing	Lotus Exige V6 Cup R	Toyota 3.5 L V6	726	(Monaco) Vito Utzieri	2	
(Belgium) Speed Lover	Porsche 992 GT3 Cup	Porsche 4.0 L Flat-6	979	(Belgium) Gilles Smits	3	
(Belgium) Speed Lover	Porsche 992 GT3 Cup	Porsche 4.0 L Flat-6	979	(Netherlands) Jaxon Verhoeven	3	
(Belgium) Speed Lover	Porsche 992 GT3 Cup	Porsche 4.0 L Flat-6	979	(Netherlands) Jean-Pierre Verhoeven	3	
(Germany) MRS GT-Racing	Porsche 992 GT3 Cup	Porsche 4.0 L Flat-6	987	(United States) Omar Balkissoon	7	
(Germany) MRS GT-Racing	Porsche 992 GT3 Cup	Porsche 4.0 L Flat-6	987	(United States) Jeff Courtney	7	
(Germany) MRS GT-Racing	Porsche 992 GT3 Cup	Porsche 4.0 L Flat-6	987	(United States) Alexander Marmureanu	7	
(Germany) MRS GT-Racing	Porsche 992 GT3 Cup	Porsche 4.0 L Flat-6	987	(Colombia) Sebastian Moreno	7	
(Germany) MRS GT-Racing	Porsche 992 GT3 Cup	Porsche 4.0 L Flat-6	989	(Mexico) Jeronimo Guzman	7	
(Germany) MRS GT-Racing	Porsche 992 GT3 Cup	Porsche 4.0 L Flat-6	989	(Brazil) Raulino Kreis Jr	7	
(Germany) MRS GT-Racing	Porsche 992 GT3 Cup	Porsche 4.0 L Flat-6	989	(United States) Robert Lorndale	7	
(Germany) MRS GT-Racing	Porsche 992 GT3 Cup	Porsche 4.0 L Flat-6	989	(United States) Pedro Torres	7	
(Netherlands) Red Camel-Jordans.nl	Porsche 992 GT3 Cup	Porsche 4.0 L Flat-6	999	(Netherlands) Ivo Breukers	4–5	
(Netherlands) Red Camel-Jordans.nl	Porsche 992 GT3 Cup	Porsche 4.0 L Flat-6	999	(Netherlands) Luc Breukers	4–5	
(Netherlands) Red Camel-Jordans.nl	Porsche 992 GT3 Cup	Porsche 4.0 L Flat-6	999	(Netherlands) Rik Breukers	4	
(Netherlands) Red Camel-Jordans.nl	Porsche 992 GT3 Cup	Porsche 4.0 L Flat-6	999	(United Arab Emirates) Bashar Mardini	5	
(Netherlands) Red Camel-Jordans.nl	Porsche 992 GT3 Cup	Porsche 4.0 L Flat-6	999	(Netherlands) Thierry Vermeulen	5	
991
(United States) RPM with Krohn Racing	Porsche 991 GT3 II Cup	Porsche 4.0 L Flat-6	907	(Sweden) Niclas Jönsson	7	
(United States) RPM with Krohn Racing	Porsche 991 GT3 II Cup	Porsche 4.0 L Flat-6	907	(Netherlands) Patrick Huisman	7	
(United States) RPM with Krohn Racing	Porsche 991 GT3 II Cup	Porsche 4.0 L Flat-6	907	(United States) Tracy Krohn	7	
(United States) RPM with Krohn Racing	Porsche 991 GT3 II Cup	Porsche 4.0 L Flat-6	907	(United States) Andy Lally	7	
(Luxembourg) DUWO Racing	Porsche 991 GT3 II Cup	Porsche 4.0 L Flat-6	909	(Russia) Andrey Mukovoz	1–5	
(Luxembourg) DUWO Racing	Porsche 991 GT3 II Cup	Porsche 4.0 L Flat-6	909	(Russia) Sergey Peregudov	1–5	
(Luxembourg) DUWO Racing	Porsche 991 GT3 II Cup	Porsche 4.0 L Flat-6	909	(Russia) Stanislav Sidoruk	1–5	
(Luxembourg) DUWO Racing	Porsche 991 GT3 II Cup	Porsche 4.0 L Flat-6	909	(Luxembourg) Dylan Pereira	1	
(Lithuania) Juta Racing	Porsche 991 GT3 II Cup	Porsche 4.0 L Flat-6	910	(Lithuania) Julius Adomavičius	2	
(Lithuania) Juta Racing	Porsche 991 GT3 II Cup	Porsche 4.0 L Flat-6	910	(Lithuania) Andrius Gelžinis	2	
(Lithuania) Juta Racing	Porsche 991 GT3 II Cup	Porsche 4.0 L Flat-6	910	(Lithuania) Jonas Gelžinis	2	
(France) Porsche Lorient Racing	Porsche 991 GT3 II Cup	Porsche 4.0 L Flat-6	911	(France) Lionel Amrouche	3	
(France) Porsche Lorient Racing	Porsche 991 GT3 II Cup	Porsche 4.0 L Flat-6	911	(France) Frédéric Ancel	3	
(France) Porsche Lorient Racing	Porsche 991 GT3 II Cup	Porsche 4.0 L Flat-6	911	(France) Frederic Lelievre	3	
(France) Porsche Lorient Racing	Porsche 991 GT3 II Cup	Porsche 4.0 L Flat-6	911	(France) Philippe Polette	3	
(Switzerland) Stadler Motorsport	Porsche 991 GT3 II Cup	Porsche 4.0 L Flat-6	920	(Switzerland) Paul Kasper	2, 4	
(Switzerland) Stadler Motorsport	Porsche 991 GT3 II Cup	Porsche 4.0 L Flat-6	920	(Switzerland) Ramon Werner	2, 4	
(Switzerland) Stadler Motorsport	Porsche 991 GT3 II Cup	Porsche 4.0 L Flat-6	920	(Switzerland) Marc Arn	2	
(Switzerland) Stadler Motorsport	Porsche 991 GT3 II Cup	Porsche 4.0 L Flat-6	920	(Switzerland) Jan Klingelnberg	2	
(Switzerland) Stadler Motorsport	Porsche 991 GT3 II Cup	Porsche 4.0 L Flat-6	920	(Switzerland) Enzo Calderari	4	
(Switzerland) Stadler Motorsport	Porsche 991 GT3 II Cup	Porsche 4.0 L Flat-6	920	(Switzerland) Philipe Menotti	4	
(Germany) Nebulus Racing by Huber	Porsche 991 GT3 II Cup	Porsche 4.0 L Flat-6	924	(Russia) Merabi Mekvabishvili	1–2	
(Germany) Nebulus Racing by Huber	Porsche 991 GT3 II Cup	Porsche 4.0 L Flat-6	924	(Germany) Matthias Hoffsümmer	1	
(Germany) Nebulus Racing by Huber	Porsche 991 GT3 II Cup	Porsche 4.0 L Flat-6	924	(Russia) Ilya Melnikov	1	
(Germany) Nebulus Racing by Huber	Porsche 991 GT3 II Cup	Porsche 4.0 L Flat-6	924	(Netherlands) Larry ten Voorde	1	
(Germany) Nebulus Racing by Huber	Porsche 991 GT3 II Cup	Porsche 4.0 L Flat-6	924	(Luxembourg) Gabriele Rindone	1	
(Germany) Nebulus Racing by Huber	Porsche 991 GT3 II Cup	Porsche 4.0 L Flat-6	924	(Italy) Andreas Corradina	2	
(Germany) Nebulus Racing by Huber	Porsche 991 GT3 II Cup	Porsche 4.0 L Flat-6	924	(Russia) Nikolai Gadetsky	2	
(Netherlands) / Bas Koeten Racing (Note: Car No. 925 entered as Bas Koeten Racing and car No. 991 entered as NKPP Racing by Bas Koeten Racing.); (Netherlands) / NKPP Racing by Bas Koeten Racing	Porsche 991 GT3 II Cup	Porsche 4.0 L Flat-6	925	(Netherlands) Glenn van Berlo	4	
(Netherlands) / Bas Koeten Racing; (Netherlands) / NKPP Racing by Bas Koeten Racing	Porsche 991 GT3 II Cup	Porsche 4.0 L Flat-6	925	(Netherlands) Marcel van Berlo	4	
(Netherlands) / Bas Koeten Racing; (Netherlands) / NKPP Racing by Bas Koeten Racing	Porsche 991 GT3 II Cup	Porsche 4.0 L Flat-6	925	(Netherlands) Bart van Helden	4	
(Netherlands) / Bas Koeten Racing; (Netherlands) / NKPP Racing by Bas Koeten Racing	Porsche 991 GT3 II Cup	Porsche 4.0 L Flat-6	991	(Netherlands) Gijs Bessem	1, 4	
(Netherlands) / Bas Koeten Racing; (Netherlands) / NKPP Racing by Bas Koeten Racing	Porsche 991 GT3 II Cup	Porsche 4.0 L Flat-6	991	(Netherlands) Harry Hilders	1, 4	
(Netherlands) / Bas Koeten Racing; (Netherlands) / NKPP Racing by Bas Koeten Racing	Porsche 991 GT3 II Cup	Porsche 4.0 L Flat-6	991	(Netherlands) Bob Herber	1	
(Netherlands) / Bas Koeten Racing; (Netherlands) / NKPP Racing by Bas Koeten Racing	Porsche 991 GT3 II Cup	Porsche 4.0 L Flat-6	991	(Netherlands) Roeland Voerman	1	
(Netherlands) / Bas Koeten Racing; (Netherlands) / NKPP Racing by Bas Koeten Racing	Porsche 991 GT3 II Cup	Porsche 4.0 L Flat-6	991	(Netherlands) Bas Barenbrug	4	
(Germany) HRT Performance	Porsche 991 GT3 II Cup	Porsche 4.0 L Flat-6	928	(Sweden) Erik Behrens	1	
(Germany) HRT Performance	Porsche 991 GT3 II Cup	Porsche 4.0 L Flat-6	928	(Germany) Fabio Citignola	1	
(Germany) HRT Performance	Porsche 991 GT3 II Cup	Porsche 4.0 L Flat-6	928	(Germany) Sebastian Freymuth	1	
(Germany) HRT Performance	Porsche 991 GT3 II Cup	Porsche 4.0 L Flat-6	928	(Germany) Leon Köhler	1	
(Germany) HRT Performance	Porsche 991 GT3 II Cup	Porsche 4.0 L Flat-6	928	(United Kingdom) JM Littman	1	
(Germany) HRT Performance	Porsche 991 GT3 II Cup	Porsche 4.0 L Flat-6	929	(United Kingdom) JM Littman	1	
(Germany) HRT Performance	Porsche 991 GT3 II Cup	Porsche 4.0 L Flat-6	929	(Germany) Oliver Freymuth	1	
(Germany) HRT Performance	Porsche 991 GT3 II Cup	Porsche 4.0 L Flat-6	929	(Russia) Nikolai Gadetsky	1	
(Germany) HRT Performance	Porsche 991 GT3 II Cup	Porsche 4.0 L Flat-6	929	(Germany) Holger Harmsen	1	
(Germany) HRT Performance	Porsche 991 GT3 II Cup	Porsche 4.0 L Flat-6	929	(Germany) Kim André Hauschild	1	
(Italy) (Romania) / Ebimotors (Note: Car No. 955 entered as Willi Motorsport by Ebimotors and car No. 973 entered as Ebimotors.); (Italy) (Romania) / Willi Motorsport by Ebimotors	Porsche 991 GT3 II Cup	Porsche 4.0 L Flat-6	955	(Italy) Fabrizio Broggi	2, 4–7	
(Italy) (Romania) / Ebimotors; (Italy) (Romania) / Willi Motorsport by Ebimotors	Porsche 991 GT3 II Cup	Porsche 4.0 L Flat-6	955	(Italy) Sabino de Castro	2, 4–7	
(Italy) (Romania) / Ebimotors; (Italy) (Romania) / Willi Motorsport by Ebimotors	Porsche 991 GT3 II Cup	Porsche 4.0 L Flat-6	955	(Romania) Sergiu Nicolae	2, 4–7	
(Italy) (Romania) / Ebimotors; (Italy) (Romania) / Willi Motorsport by Ebimotors	Porsche 991 GT3 II Cup	Porsche 4.0 L Flat-6	973	(Italy) Massimiliano Donzelli	2	
(Italy) (Romania) / Ebimotors; (Italy) (Romania) / Willi Motorsport by Ebimotors	Porsche 991 GT3 II Cup	Porsche 4.0 L Flat-6	973	(Italy) Gianluca Giorgi	2	
(Italy) (Romania) / Ebimotors; (Italy) (Romania) / Willi Motorsport by Ebimotors	Porsche 991 GT3 II Cup	Porsche 4.0 L Flat-6	973	(Italy) Paolo Gnemmi	2	
(Italy) (Romania) / Ebimotors; (Italy) (Romania) / Willi Motorsport by Ebimotors	Porsche 991 GT3 II Cup	Porsche 4.0 L Flat-6	973	(Italy) Luigi Peroni	2	
(San Marino) GDL Racing	Porsche 991 GT3 II Cup	Porsche 4.0 L Flat-6	967	(Finland) Axel Blom	2	
(San Marino) GDL Racing	Porsche 991 GT3 II Cup	Porsche 4.0 L Flat-6	967	(Italy) Mario Cordoni	2	
(San Marino) GDL Racing	Porsche 991 GT3 II Cup	Porsche 4.0 L Flat-6	967	(Argentina) Andres Bruno Josephsohn	2	
(San Marino) GDL Racing	Porsche 991 GT3 II Cup	Porsche 4.0 L Flat-6	967	(Argentina) Andres Michel Josephsohn	2	
(San Marino) GDL Racing	Porsche 991 GT3 II Cup	Porsche 4.0 L Flat-6	969	(Italy) Gianluca de Lorenzi	2	
(San Marino) GDL Racing	Porsche 991 GT3 II Cup	Porsche 4.0 L Flat-6	969	(Italy) Maurizio Fratti	2	
(San Marino) GDL Racing	Porsche 991 GT3 II Cup	Porsche 4.0 L Flat-6	969	(Italy) Giacomo Giubergia	2	
(San Marino) GDL Racing	Porsche 991 GT3 II Cup	Porsche 4.0 L Flat-6	969	(Italy) Roberto Rayneri	2	
(Belgium) Speed Lover	Porsche 991 GT3 II Cup	Porsche 4.0 L Flat-6	978	(Belgium) Olivier Dons	1, 3, 5	
(Belgium) Speed Lover	Porsche 991 GT3 II Cup	Porsche 4.0 L Flat-6	978	(Belgium) Pieter Ooms	1	
(Belgium) Speed Lover	Porsche 991 GT3 II Cup	Porsche 4.0 L Flat-6	978	(France) Michael Blanchemain	1	
(Belgium) Speed Lover	Porsche 991 GT3 II Cup	Porsche 4.0 L Flat-6	978	(Belgium) Pierre-Yves Paque	1	
(Belgium) Speed Lover	Porsche 991 GT3 II Cup	Porsche 4.0 L Flat-6	978	(Belgium) Jürgen van Hover	1	
(Belgium) Speed Lover	Porsche 991 GT3 II Cup	Porsche 4.0 L Flat-6	978	(United States) Dominique Bastien	3	
(Belgium) Speed Lover	Porsche 991 GT3 II Cup	Porsche 4.0 L Flat-6	978	(France) Eric Mouez	3	
(Belgium) Speed Lover	Porsche 991 GT3 II Cup	Porsche 4.0 L Flat-6	978	(United Kingdom) Ricky Coomber	5	
(Belgium) Speed Lover	Porsche 991 GT3 II Cup	Porsche 4.0 L Flat-6	978	(United Kingdom) Gavin Pickering	5	
(Belgium) Speed Lover	Porsche 991 GT3 II Cup	Porsche 4.0 L Flat-6	979	(Belgium) Kurt Hensen	1	
(Belgium) Speed Lover	Porsche 991 GT3 II Cup	Porsche 4.0 L Flat-6	979	(Belgium) Rolf Lietart	1	
(Belgium) Speed Lover	Porsche 991 GT3 II Cup	Porsche 4.0 L Flat-6	979	(France) Eric Mouez	1	
(Belgium) Speed Lover	Porsche 991 GT3 II Cup	Porsche 4.0 L Flat-6	979	(Belgium) Jürgen van Hover	1	
(Belgium) Speed Lover	Porsche 991 GT3 II Cup	Porsche 4.0 L Flat-6	979	(Belgium) Philippe Wils	1	
(Germany) (United Arab Emirates) / MRS GT-Racing (Note: Car No. 989 entered as MRS GT-Racing for rounds 1 and 4, entered as RABDAN by MRS GT-Racing for round 5.); (Germany) (United Arab Emirates) / RABDAN by MRS GT-Racing	Porsche 991 GT3 II Cup	Porsche 4.0 L Flat-6	989	(United Arab Emirates) Saif Alameri	1, 4–5	
(Germany) (United Arab Emirates) / MRS GT-Racing; (Germany) (United Arab Emirates) / RABDAN by MRS GT-Racing	Porsche 991 GT3 II Cup	Porsche 4.0 L Flat-6	989	(Netherlands) Jeroen Bleekemolen	1	
(Germany) (United Arab Emirates) / MRS GT-Racing; (Germany) (United Arab Emirates) / RABDAN by MRS GT-Racing	Porsche 991 GT3 II Cup	Porsche 4.0 L Flat-6	989	(Finland) Jukka Honkavuori	1	
(Germany) (United Arab Emirates) / MRS GT-Racing; (Germany) (United Arab Emirates) / RABDAN by MRS GT-Racing	Porsche 991 GT3 II Cup	Porsche 4.0 L Flat-6	989	(United States) Tim Pappas	1	
(Germany) (United Arab Emirates) / MRS GT-Racing; (Germany) (United Arab Emirates) / RABDAN by MRS GT-Racing	Porsche 991 GT3 II Cup	Porsche 4.0 L Flat-6	989	(Russia) Nikolai Gadetsky	4–5	
(Germany) (United Arab Emirates) / MRS GT-Racing; (Germany) (United Arab Emirates) / RABDAN by MRS GT-Racing	Porsche 991 GT3 II Cup	Porsche 4.0 L Flat-6	989	(Netherlands) Thierry Vermeulen	4	
(Germany) (United Arab Emirates) / MRS GT-Racing; (Germany) (United Arab Emirates) / RABDAN by MRS GT-Racing	Porsche 991 GT3 II Cup	Porsche 4.0 L Flat-6	989	(Lithuania) Audrius Butkevicius	5	
(Germany) (United Arab Emirates) / MRS GT-Racing; (Germany) (United Arab Emirates) / RABDAN by MRS GT-Racing	Porsche 991 GT3 II Cup	Porsche 4.0 L Flat-6	989	(Italy) Nicola Michelon	5	
GT4
(Germany) PROsport Performance AMR	Aston Martin Vantage AMR GT4	Aston Martin 4.0 L Turbo V8	401	(Belgium) Rodrigue Gillion	1, 3–4	
(Germany) PROsport Performance AMR	Aston Martin Vantage AMR GT4	Aston Martin 4.0 L Turbo V8	401	(Belgium) Nico Verdonck	1, 3–4	
(Germany) PROsport Performance AMR	Aston Martin Vantage AMR GT4	Aston Martin 4.0 L Turbo V8	401	(Belgium) Stéphane Lémeret	1	
(Germany) PROsport Performance AMR	Aston Martin Vantage AMR GT4	Aston Martin 4.0 L Turbo V8	401	(Denmark) Patrik Matthiesen	1	
(Germany) PROsport Performance AMR	Aston Martin Vantage AMR GT4	Aston Martin 4.0 L Turbo V8	401	(Austria) Constantin Schöll	1	
(Germany) PROsport Performance AMR	Aston Martin Vantage AMR GT4	Aston Martin 4.0 L Turbo V8	401	(Belgium) Kurt Hensen	3–4	
(Switzerland) Centri Porsche Ticino	Porsche 718 Cayman GT4 Clubsport	Porsche 3.8 L Flat-6	412	(Netherlands) Christian de Kant	2	
(Switzerland) Centri Porsche Ticino	Porsche 718 Cayman GT4 Clubsport	Porsche 3.8 L Flat-6	412	(Italy) Alessandro Fogliani	2	
(Switzerland) Centri Porsche Ticino	Porsche 718 Cayman GT4 Clubsport	Porsche 3.8 L Flat-6	412	(Germany) Thomas Herbst	2	
(Switzerland) Centri Porsche Ticino	Porsche 718 Cayman GT4 Clubsport	Porsche 3.8 L Flat-6	412	(Switzerland) Valerio Presezzi	2	
(Switzerland) Centri Porsche Ticino	Porsche 718 Cayman GT4 Clubsport	Porsche 3.8 L Flat-6	412	(Italy) Antonio Spavone	2	
(United States) Team ACP - Tanger Associates	BMW M4 GT4	BMW N55 3.0 L Twin-Turbo I6	421	(United States) Ken Goldberg	7	
(United States) Team ACP - Tanger Associates	BMW M4 GT4	BMW N55 3.0 L Twin-Turbo I6	421	(United States) Catesby Jones	7	
(United States) Team ACP - Tanger Associates	BMW M4 GT4	BMW N55 3.0 L Twin-Turbo I6	421	(United States) Jim Norman	7	
(United States) Team ACP - Tanger Associates	BMW M4 GT4	BMW N55 3.0 L Twin-Turbo I6	421	(United States) Josh Norman	7	
(United States) Heart of Racing Team	Aston Martin Vantage AMR GT4	Aston Martin 4.0 L Turbo V8	423	(Canada) Roman De Angelis	7	
(United States) Heart of Racing Team	Aston Martin Vantage AMR GT4	Aston Martin 4.0 L Turbo V8	423	(United Kingdom) Ian James	7	
(United States) Heart of Racing Team	Aston Martin Vantage AMR GT4	Aston Martin 4.0 L Turbo V8	423	(United States) Gray Newell	7	
(United States) Heart of Racing Team	Aston Martin Vantage AMR GT4	Aston Martin 4.0 L Turbo V8	423	(Spain) Alex Riberas	7	
(Canada) ST Racing	BMW M4 GT4	BMW N55 3.0 L Twin-Turbo I6	438	(United States) Chandler Hull	All	
(Canada) ST Racing	BMW M4 GT4	BMW N55 3.0 L Twin-Turbo I6	438	(United States) Jon Miller	All	
(Canada) ST Racing	BMW M4 GT4	BMW N55 3.0 L Twin-Turbo I6	438	(Canada) Samantha Tan	All	
(Canada) ST Racing	BMW M4 GT4	BMW N55 3.0 L Twin-Turbo I6	438	(Canada) Nick Wittmer	1, 4–5, 7	
(Canada) ST Racing	BMW M4 GT4	BMW N55 3.0 L Twin-Turbo I6	438	(United States) Bryson Morris	7	
(United States) RHC Jorgensen-Strom by Century	BMW M4 GT4	BMW N55 3.0 L Twin-Turbo I6	450	(United Kingdom) Nathan Freke	5	
(United States) RHC Jorgensen-Strom by Century	BMW M4 GT4	BMW N55 3.0 L Twin-Turbo I6	450	(United States) Daren Jorgensen	5	
(United States) RHC Jorgensen-Strom by Century	BMW M4 GT4	BMW N55 3.0 L Twin-Turbo I6	450	(United States) Brett Strom	5	
(United States) RHC Jorgensen-Strom by Century	BMW M4 GT4	BMW N55 3.0 L Twin-Turbo I6	450	(Netherlands) Danny van Dongen	5	
(France) 3Y Technology	BMW M4 GT4	BMW N55 3.0 L Twin-Turbo I6	451	(Mozambique) Rodrigo Almeida	1	
(France) 3Y Technology	BMW M4 GT4	BMW N55 3.0 L Twin-Turbo I6	451	(France) Gilles Lallement	1	
(France) 3Y Technology	BMW M4 GT4	BMW N55 3.0 L Twin-Turbo I6	451	(United States) Vincent Piemonte	1	
(France) 3Y Technology	BMW M4 GT4	BMW N55 3.0 L Twin-Turbo I6	451	(Denmark) Thomas Sørensen	1	
(France) 3Y Technology	BMW M4 GT4	BMW N55 3.0 L Twin-Turbo I6	451	(France) Gilles Vannelet	1	
(Germany) Team Avia Sorg Rennsport	BMW M4 GT4	BMW N55 3.0 L Twin-Turbo I6	452	(United Kingdom) Matt Brookes	1	
(Germany) Team Avia Sorg Rennsport	BMW M4 GT4	BMW N55 3.0 L Twin-Turbo I6	452	(Portugal) Luis Calheiros	1	
(Germany) Team Avia Sorg Rennsport	BMW M4 GT4	BMW N55 3.0 L Twin-Turbo I6	452	(Portugal) Paulo Macedo	1	
(Germany) Team Avia Sorg Rennsport	BMW M4 GT4	BMW N55 3.0 L Twin-Turbo I6	452	(Portugal) JJ Magalhães	1	
(Germany) Team Avia Sorg Rennsport	BMW M4 GT4	BMW N55 3.0 L Twin-Turbo I6	452	(Portugal) José Pires	1	
(United States) NOLASPORT	Porsche 718 Cayman GT4 Clubsport	Porsche 3.8 L Flat-6	470	(United States) Zac Anderson	7	
(United States) NOLASPORT	Porsche 718 Cayman GT4 Clubsport	Porsche 3.8 L Flat-6	470	(United States) Jason Hart	7	
(United States) NOLASPORT	Porsche 718 Cayman GT4 Clubsport	Porsche 3.8 L Flat-6	470	(United States) Alex Mayer	7	
(United States) NOLASPORT	Porsche 718 Cayman GT4 Clubsport	Porsche 3.8 L Flat-6	470	(United States) Anthony Noble	7	
(United States) NOLASPORT	Porsche 718 Cayman GT4 Clubsport	Porsche 3.8 L Flat-6	470	(United States) Matt Travis	7	
(United Arab Emirates) Dragon Racing	Mercedes-AMG GT4	Mercedes-AMG M178 4.0 L V8	488	(United Kingdom) Adam Christodoulou	1	
(United Arab Emirates) Dragon Racing	Mercedes-AMG GT4	Mercedes-AMG M178 4.0 L V8	488	(United Kingdom) Ollie Hancock	1	
(United Arab Emirates) Dragon Racing	Mercedes-AMG GT4	Mercedes-AMG M178 4.0 L V8	488	(United Kingdom) John Hartshorne	1	
(United Arab Emirates) Dragon Racing	Mercedes-AMG GT4	Mercedes-AMG M178 4.0 L V8	488	(Russia) Denis Remenyako	1	
(United States) RENNtech Motorsports	Mercedes-AMG GT4	Mercedes-AMG M178 4.0 L V8	489	(United States) Chapman Ducote	7	
(United States) RENNtech Motorsports	Mercedes-AMG GT4	Mercedes-AMG M178 4.0 L V8	489	(United States) David Ducote	7	
(United States) RENNtech Motorsports	Mercedes-AMG GT4	Mercedes-AMG M178 4.0 L V8	489	(United States) Wayne Ducote	7	
(United States) RENNtech Motorsports	Mercedes-AMG GT4	Mercedes-AMG M178 4.0 L V8	489	(Canada) Kyle Marcelli	7	
(United States) RENNtech Motorsports	Mercedes-AMG GT4	Mercedes-AMG M178 4.0 L V8	489	(United States) Alan Metni	7	
(Germany) / Car Collection Motorsport (Note: Car No. 499 entered as Car Collection Motorsport for round 5 and Lionspeed by Car Collection Motorsport for round 7.); (Germany) / Lionspeed Car Collection Motorsport	Audi R8 LMS GT4 Evo	Audi 5.2 L V10	499	(United States) Lisa Clark	5	
(Germany) / Car Collection Motorsport; (Germany) / Lionspeed Car Collection Motorsport	Audi R8 LMS GT4 Evo	Audi 5.2 L V10	499	(United States) Mark Issa	5	
(Germany) / Car Collection Motorsport; (Germany) / Lionspeed Car Collection Motorsport	Audi R8 LMS GT4 Evo	Audi 5.2 L V10	499	(Germany) Martin Lechmann	5	
(Germany) / Car Collection Motorsport; (Germany) / Lionspeed Car Collection Motorsport	Audi R8 LMS GT4 Evo	Audi 5.2 L V10	499	(United States) Jeff Westphal	5	
(Germany) / Car Collection Motorsport; (Germany) / Lionspeed Car Collection Motorsport	Audi R8 LMS GT4 Evo	Audi 5.2 L V10	499	(United States) José Garcia	7	
(Germany) / Car Collection Motorsport; (Germany) / Lionspeed Car Collection Motorsport	Audi R8 LMS GT4 Evo	Audi 5.2 L V10	499	(Germany) Patrick Kolb	7	
(Germany) / Car Collection Motorsport; (Germany) / Lionspeed Car Collection Motorsport	Audi R8 LMS GT4 Evo	Audi 5.2 L V10	499	(Switzerland) Patric Niederhauser	7	
(Germany) / Car Collection Motorsport; (Germany) / Lionspeed Car Collection Motorsport	Audi R8 LMS GT4 Evo	Audi 5.2 L V10	499	(Germany) Jörg Viebahn	7	
P4
(Germany) BMW M Motorsport	BMW M4 GT3	BMW S58B30T0 3.0 L Twin Turbo I6	82	(United States) Bill Auberlen	7	
(Germany) BMW M Motorsport	BMW M4 GT3	BMW S58B30T0 3.0 L Twin Turbo I6	82	(United States) James Clay	7	
(Germany) BMW M Motorsport	BMW M4 GT3	BMW S58B30T0 3.0 L Twin Turbo I6	82	(United States) Robby Foley	7	
(Germany) BMW M Motorsport	BMW M4 GT3	BMW S58B30T0 3.0 L Twin Turbo I6	82	(Germany) Max Hesse	7	
(Germany) BMW M Motorsport	BMW M4 GT3	BMW S58B30T0 3.0 L Twin Turbo I6	82	(United States) Neil Verhagen	7	
(Germany) Car Collection Motorsport	Audi R8 LMS Evo II	Audi 5.2 L V10	500	(France) Nathanaël Berthon	5–6	
(Germany) Car Collection Motorsport	Audi R8 LMS Evo II	Audi 5.2 L V10	500	(Germany) Martin Lechmann	5–6	
(Germany) Car Collection Motorsport	Audi R8 LMS Evo II	Audi 5.2 L V10	500	(Germany) Christer Jöns	5	
(Germany) Car Collection Motorsport	Audi R8 LMS Evo II	Audi 5.2 L V10	500	(Switzerland) Patric Niederhauser	5	
(Germany) Car Collection Motorsport	Audi R8 LMS Evo II	Audi 5.2 L V10	500	(Estonia) Martin Rump	6	

Icon	Class
P	GT3-Pro
Am	GT3-Am

== Race results ==
Bold indicates overall winner.

Event	Circuit	GT3-Pro Winners	GT3-Am Winners	GTX Winners	991 Winners	GT4 Winners	Report
1	(United Arab Emirates) Dubai Autodrome	**(United Arab Emirates) No. 36 GPX Racing**	(United Arab Emirates) No. 5 Team HRT Abu Dhabi Racing	(Germany) No. 710 Leipert Motorsport	(Netherlands) No. 991 NKPP Racing by Bas Koeten Racing	(Canada) No. 438 ST Racing	Report
1	(United Arab Emirates) Dubai Autodrome	**(France) Julien Andlauer** **(United Arab Emirates) Frédéric Fatien** **(France) Alain Ferté** **(France) Mathieu Jaminet** **(Zimbabwe) Axcil Jefferies**	(United Arab Emirates) Khaled Al Qubaisi (Germany) Patrick Assenheimer (Germany) Nico Bastian (Germany) Valentin Pierburg (Germany) Florian Scholze	(United States) Gregg Gorski (United States) Oscar Lee (Germany) Fidel Leib (Switzerland) Kurt Thiel (United States) Gerhard Watzinger	(Netherlands) Gijs Bessem (Netherlands) Bob Herber (Netherlands) Harry Hilders (Netherlands) Roeland Voerman	(United States) Chandler Hull (United States) Jon Miller (Canada) Samantha Tan (Canada) Nick Wittmer	Report
2	(Italy) Mugello	None Entered #	**(Germany) No. 91 Herberth Motorsport**	(Germany) No. 724 Reiter Engineering	(Italy) No. 955 Willi Motorsport by Ebimotors	(Switzerland) No. 412 Centri Porsche Ticino	Report
2	(Italy) Mugello	None Entered #	**(Switzerland) Daniel Allemann** **(Germany) Ralf Bohn** **(Germany) Alfred Renauer** **(Germany) Robert Renauer**	(Austria) Eike Angermayr (United States) Nicolai Elghanayan (Austria) Horst Felbermayr Jr. (Norway) Mads Siljehaug	(Italy) Fabrizio Broggi (Italy) Sabino de Castro (Romania) Sergiu Nicolae	(Netherlands) Christian de Kant (Italy) Alessandro Fogliani (Germany) Thomas Herbst (Switzerland) Valerio Presezzi (Italy) Antonio Spavone	Report
3	(France) Circuit Paul Ricard	None Entered	**(Germany) No. 91 Herberth Motorsport**	(Germany) No. 724 Reiter Engineering	(France) No. 911 Porsche Lorient Racing	(Germany) No. 401 PROsport Performance AMR	Report
3	(France) Circuit Paul Ricard	None Entered	**(Switzerland) Daniel Allemann** **(Germany) Ralf Bohn** **(Germany) Alfred Renauer** **(Germany) Robert Renauer**	(Austria) Eike Angermayr (United States) Nicolai Elghanayan (Austria) Horst Felbermayr Jr. (Norway) Mads Siljehaug	(France) Lionel Amrouche (France) Frédéric Ancel (France) Frederic Lelievre (France) Philippe Polette	(Belgium) Rodrigue Gillion (Belgium) Kurt Hensen (Belgium) Nico Verdonck	Report
4	(Germany) Hockenheimring	Merged with GT3-Am	**(Switzerland) No. 66 Haegeli by T2 Racing**	(Germany) No. 719 9und11 Racing	(Netherlands) No. 925 Bas Koeten Racing	(Germany) No. 401 PROsport Performance AMR	Report
4	(Germany) Hockenheimring	Merged with GT3-Am	**(Germany) Marc Basseng** **(Switzerland) Pieder Decurtins** **(Germany) Manuel Lauck**	(Germany) Georg Goder (Germany) Ralf Oehme (Germany) Tim Scheerbarth (Germany) Martin Schlüter	(Netherlands) Glenn van Berlo (Netherlands) Marcel van Berlo (Netherlands) Bart van Helden	(Belgium) Rodrigue Gillion (Belgium) Kurt Hensen (Belgium) Nico Verdonck	Report
5	(Spain) Barcelona	Merged with GT3-Am	**(Germany) No. 91 Herberth Motorsport**	(Germany) No. 724 Reiter Engineering	(Italy) No. 955 Willi Motorsport by Ebimotors	(Canada) No. 438 ST Racing	Report
5	(Spain) Barcelona	Merged with GT3-Am	**(Switzerland) Daniel Allemann** **(Germany) Ralf Bohn** **(Germany) Alfred Renauer** **(Germany) Robert Renauer**	(Austria) Eike Angermayr (Austria) Horst Felbermayr Jr. (Norway) Mads Siljehaug	(Italy) Fabrizio Broggi (Italy) Sabino de Castro (Romania) Sergiu Nicolae	(United States) Chandler Hull (United States) Jon Miller (Canada) Samantha Tan (Canada) Nick Wittmer	Report
6	(Hungary) Hungaroring	None entered	**(Germany) No. 91 Herberth Motorsport**	(Lithuania) No. 720 Siauliai - RD Signs racing team	(Italy) No. 955 Willi Motorsport by Ebimotors	(Canada) No. 438 ST Racing	Report
6	(Hungary) Hungaroring	None entered	**(Switzerland) Daniel Allemann** **(Germany) Ralf Bohn** **(Germany) Alfred Renauer**	(Lithuania) Audrius Butkevicius (Italy) Nicola Michelon (Lithuania) Paulius Paskevicius	(Italy) Fabrizio Broggi (Italy) Sabino de Castro (Romania) Sergiu Nicolae	(United States) Chandler Hull (United States) Jon Miller (Canada) Samantha Tan	Report
7	(United States) Sebring	Merged with GT3-Am	**(Germany) No. 18 Rutronik Racing by TECE**	(Germany) No. 710 Leipert Motorsport	(Italy) No. 955 Willi Motorsport by Ebimotors	(United States) No. 470 NOLASPORT	Report
7	(United States) Sebring	Merged with GT3-Am	**(Austria) Michael Doppelmayr** **(Germany) Swen Herberger** **(Germany) Pierre Kaffer** **(Germany) Markus Winkelhock**	(United States) Gregg Gorski (United States) Lance Bergstein (Germany) Matthias Hoffsümmer (United States) Kenton Koch (United States) Al Miller (United States) Gerhard Watzinger	(Italy) Fabrizio Broggi (Italy) Sabino de Castro (Romania) Sergiu Nicolae	(United States) Zac Anderson (United States) Jason Hart (United States) Alex Mayer (United States) Scott Noble (United States) Matt Travis	Report

=== Championship standings ===
==== Drivers' Overall ====
Pos.	Drivers	Team	Class	(United Arab Emirates) DUB	(Italy) MUG	(France) LEC	(Germany) HOC	(Spain) BAR	(Hungary) HUN	(United States) SEB	Pts.
1	(United States) Chandler Hull (United States) Jon Miller (Canada) Samantha Tan	(Canada) No. 438 ST Racing	GT4	15	29	Ret	25†	12	11	7	130
2	(Germany) Alfred Renauer	(Germany) No. 91 Herberth Motorsport	GT3-Am	Ret	1	1		1	1	2	115
2	(Germany) Alfred Renauer	(Germany) No. 92 Herberth Motorsport	GT3-Am				24†				115
3	(Switzerland) Daniel Allemann (Germany) Ralf Bohn	(Germany) No. 91 Herberth Motorsport	GT3-Am	Ret	1	1		1	1	2	109
4	(Austria) Michael Doppelmayr (Germany) Swen Herberger	(Germany) No. 18 Rutronik Racing by TECE	GT3-Am		6	3	5	3	3	1	109
5	(Italy) Fabrizio Broggi (Italy) Sabino de Castro (Romania) Sergiu Nicolae	(Italy) No. 955 Willi Motorsport by Ebimotors	991		12		11	8	5	3	107
6	(Canada) Nick Wittmer	(Canada) No. 438 ST Racing	GT4	15			25†	12		7	97
7	(France) Philippe Bonnel	(France) No. 701 Vortex V8	GTX	35			22		13	15	96
7	(France) Philippe Bonnel	(France) No. 712 Vortex V8	GTX		23	19		22			96
8	(Germany) Elia Erhart	(Germany) No. 18 Rutronik Racing by TECE	GT3-Am		6	3	5	3		1	93
9	(Russia) Andrey Mukovoz (Russia) Sergey Peregudov (Russia) Stanislav Sidoruk	(Luxembourg) No. 909 DUWO Racing	991	14	21	14	10	11			91
10	(Germany) Robert Renauer	(Germany) No. 91 Herberth Motorsport	GT3-Am	Ret	1	1		1		2	90
Pos.	Drivers	Team	Class	(United Arab Emirates) DUB	(Italy) MUG	(France) LEC	(Germany) HOC	(Spain) BAR	(Hungary) HUN	(United States) SEB	Pts.

Colour	Result
Gold	Winner
Silver	Second place
Bronze	Third place
Green	Points classification
Blue	Non-points classification
Blue	Non-classified finish (NC)
Purple	Retired, not classified (Ret)
Red	Did not qualify (DNQ)
Red	Did not pre-qualify (DNPQ)
Black	Disqualified (DSQ)
White	Did not start (DNS)
White	Withdrew (WD)
White	Race cancelled (C)
Blank	Did not practice (DNP)
Blank	Did not arrive (DNA)
Blank	Excluded (EX)

**Bold** – Pole
Italics – Fastest Lap

† – Drivers did not finish the race, but were classified as they completed over 60% of the class winner's race distance.

==== Teams' Overall ====
Pos.	Team	Class	(United Arab Emirates) DUB	(Italy) MUG	(France) LEC	(Germany) HOC	(Spain) BAR	(Hungary) HUN	(United States) SEB	Pts.
1	(Canada) No. 438 ST Racing	GT4	15	29	Ret	25†	12	11	7	130
2	(Germany) No. 91 Herberth Motorsport	GT3-Am	Ret	1	1		1	1	2	109
3	(Germany) No. 18 Rutronik Racing by TECE	GT3-Am		6	3	5	3	3	1	109
4	(Italy) No. 955 Willi Motorsport by Ebimotors	991		12		11	8	5	3	107
5	(France) No. 701 Vortex V8	GTX	35	30	15	22	21	13	15	98
6	(Luxembourg) No. 909 DUWO Racing	991	14	21	14	10	11			91
7	(Germany) No. 724 Reiter Engineering	GTX		10	5	19	7			81
8	(United States) No. 85 CP Racing	GT3-Am	38†	7		4	9	2	Ret	70
9	(Germany) No. 92 Herberth Motorsport	GT3-Pro	Ret							64
9	(Germany) No. 92 Herberth Motorsport	GT3-Am		4	Ret	24†	2	Ret	10	64
10	(Germany) No. 401 PROsport Performance AMR	GT4	16		20	17				58
Pos.	Team	Class	(United Arab Emirates) DUB	(Italy) MUG	(France) LEC	(Germany) HOC	(Spain) BAR	(Hungary) HUN	(United States) SEB	Pts.

† – Drivers did not finish the race, but were classified as they completed over 60% of the class winner's race distance.

==== GT3-Pro Drivers' ====
Pos.	Drivers	Team	(United Arab Emirates) DUB	(Italy) MUG	(France) LEC	(Germany) HOC	(Spain) BAR	(Hungary) HUN	(United States) SEB	Pts.
1	(United States) Tyler Cooke (New Zealand) Brendon Leitch	(Germany) No. 10 Leipert Motorsport				3			18†	26
2	(United Kingdom) Seb Morris	(Germany) No. 10 Leipert Motorsport				3			18†	16
One-off entries ineligible for championship positions
	(France) Julien Andlauer (France) Mathieu Jaminet (Zimbabwe) Axcil Jefferies	(United Arab Emirates) No. 36 GPX Racing	1							29
	(United Kingdom) Frank Bird (Denmark) Benjamin Goethe (Belgium) Louis Machiels (South Africa) Kelvin van der Linde (Belgium) Dries Vanthoor	(Belgium) No. 31 Team WRT	2							26
	(United Arab Emirates) Khaled Al Qubaisi (Germany) Patrick Assenheimer (Germany) Maro Engel (Germany) Hubert Haupt (United Kingdom) Ryan Ratcliffe	(Germany) No. 4 Team HRT Bilstein	3							24
	(France) Paul-Loup Chatin (France) Patrice Lafargue (France) Paul Lafargue (France) Nicolas Minassian	(France) No. 17 IDEC Sport					4			21
	(Switzerland) Adrian Amstutz (Italy) Mirko Bortolotti (Netherlands) Rik Breukers (Switzerland) Rolf Ineichen	(Austria) No. 63 GRT Grasser Racing Team	4							21
	(France) Emmanuel Collard (France) François Perrodo (France) Charles-Henri Samani (France) Matthieu Vaxivière	(France) No. 83 Racetivity	7							18
	(Germany) Fidel Leib	(Germany) No. 10 Leipert Motorsport				3				16
	(Italy) Matteo Cairoli (Switzerland) Mauro Calamia (Switzerland) Stefano Monaco (Italy) Roberto Pampanini	(Italy) No. 7 Dinamic Motorsport	19†							15
	(Germany) Dennis Fetzer	(Germany) No. 10 Leipert Motorsport							18†	10
	(United Arab Emirates) Frédéric Fatien (France) Alain Ferté	(United Arab Emirates) No. 36 GPX Racing	1							0
	(Germany) Sebastian Balthasar	(Germany) No. 10 Leipert Motorsport							18†	0
	(Germany) Daniel Keilwitz (Germany) Jochen Krumbach (Germany) Georg Weiss (Germany) Leonard Weiss	(Germany) No. 22 WTM Powered by Phoenix					Ret			0
	(Austria) Klaus Bachler (Germany) Jürgen Häring (Germany) Vincent Kolb (Germany) Sven Müller (Germany) Wolfgang Triller	(Germany) No. 92 Herberth Motorsport	Ret							0
	(Germany) Alex Aka (United Kingdom) Finlay Hutchison (Germany) Christopher Mies (Austria) Philipp Sager (Germany) Markus Winkelhock	(Germany) No. 99 Attempto Racing	Ret							0
Pos.	Drivers	Team	(United Arab Emirates) DUB	(Italy) MUG	(France) LEC	(Germany) HOC	(Spain) BAR	(Hungary) HUN	(United States) SEB	Pts.

† – Drivers did not finish the race, but were classified as they completed over 60% of the class winner's race distance.

==== GT3-Pro Teams' ====
Pos.	Team	(United Arab Emirates) DUB	(Italy) MUG	(France) LEC	(Germany) HOC	(Spain) BAR	(Hungary) HUN	(United States) SEB	Pts.
1	(Germany) No. 10 Leipert Motorsport				3			18†	26
One-off entries ineligible for championship positions
	(United Arab Emirates) No. 36 GPX Racing	1							29
	(Belgium) No. 31 Team WRT	2							26
	(Germany) No. 4 Team HRT Bilstein	3							24
	(France) No. 17 IDEC Sport					4			21
	(Austria) No. 63 GRT Grasser Racing Team	4							21
	(France) No. 83 Racetivity	7							18
	(Italy) No. 7 Dinamic Motorsport	19†							15
	(Germany) No. 22 WTM Powered by Phoenix					Ret			0
	(Germany) No. 92 Herberth Motorsport	Ret							0
	(Germany) No. 99 Attempto Racing	Ret							0
Pos.	Team	(United Arab Emirates) DUB	(Italy) MUG	(France) LEC	(Germany) HOC	(Spain) BAR	(Hungary) HUN	(United States) SEB	Pts.

† – Drivers did not finish the race, but were classified as they completed over 60% of the class winner's race distance.

==== GT3-Am Drivers' ====
Pos.	Drivers	Team	(United Arab Emirates) DUB	(Italy) MUG	(France) LEC	(Germany) HOC	(Spain) BAR	(Hungary) HUN	(United States) SEB	Pts.
1	(Germany) Alfred Renauer	(Germany) No. 91 Herberth Motorsport	Ret	1	1		1	1	2	115
1	(Germany) Alfred Renauer	(Germany) No. 92 Herberth Motorsport				24†				115
2	(Switzerland) Daniel Allemann (Germany) Ralf Bohn	(Germany) No. 91 Herberth Motorsport	Ret	1	1		1	1	2	109
3	(Austria) Michael Doppelmayr (Germany) Swen Herberger	(Germany) No. 18 Rutronik Racing by TECE		6	3	5	3	3	1	109
4	(Germany) Elia Erhart	(Germany) No. 18 Rutronik Racing by TECE		6	3	5	3		1	93
5	(Germany) Robert Renauer	(Germany) No. 91 Herberth Motorsport	Ret	1	1		1	1	2	90
6	(Germany) Pierre Kaffer	(Germany) No. 18 Rutronik Racing by TECE		6	3	5	3	3		81
7	(Germany) Tim Müller	(Germany) No. 88 Car Collection Motorsport	8		4					70
7	(Germany) Tim Müller	(Germany) No. 92 Herberth Motorsport				24†	2			70
8	(United States) Charles Espenlaub (United States) Shane Lewis (United States) Charles Putman	(United States) No. 85 CP Racing	38†	7		4	9	2	Ret	70
9	(Germany) "Bobby Gonzales"	(Germany) No. 92 Herberth Motorsport		4	Ret	24†	2	Ret	10	64
10	(Germany) Marco Seefried	(Germany) No. 92 Herberth Motorsport		4	Ret		2	Ret	10	58
Pos.	Drivers	Team	(United Arab Emirates) DUB	(Italy) MUG	(France) LEC	(Germany) HOC	(Spain) BAR	(Hungary) HUN	(United States) SEB	Pts.

† – Drivers did not finish the race, but were classified as they completed over 60% of the class winner's race distance.

==== GT3-Am Teams' ====
Pos.	Team	(United Arab Emirates) DUB	(Italy) MUG	(France) LEC	(Germany) HOC	(Spain) BAR	(Hungary) HUN	(United States) SEB	Pts.
1	(Germany) No. 91 Herberth Motorsport	Ret	1	1		1	1	2	109
2	(Germany) No. 18 Rutronik Racing by TECE		6	3	5	3	3	1	109
3	(United States) No. 85 CP Racing	38†	7		4	9	2	Ret	79
4	(Germany) No. 92 Herberth Motorsport		4	Ret	24†	2	Ret	10	64
5	(Germany) No. 34 Car Collection Motorsport	6	Ret		6	6			54
6	(Czech Republic) No. 11 MiddleCap racing with Scuderia Praha		2	2	2				53
7	(Germany) No. 88 Car Collection Motorsport	8		4	7				46
8	(Switzerland) No. 66 Haegeli by T2 Racing		5		1				34
9	(Italy) No. 58 MP Racing		18	11	28		14		33
10	(United Arab Emirates) No. 5 Team HRT Abu Dhabi Racing	5							29
Pos.	Team	(United Arab Emirates) DUB	(Italy) MUG	(France) LEC	(Germany) HOC	(Spain) BAR	(Hungary) HUN	(United States) SEB	Pts.

† – Drivers did not finish the race, but were classified as they completed over 60% of the class winner's race distance.

==== GTX Drivers' ====
Pos.	Drivers	Team	(United Arab Emirates) DUB	(Italy) MUG	(France) LEC	(Germany) HOC	(Spain) BAR	(Hungary) HUN	(United States) SEB	Pts.
1	(France) Philippe Bonnel	(France) No. 701 Vortex V8	35			22		13		87
1	(France) Philippe Bonnel	(France) No. 712 Vortex V8		23	19		22			87
2	(Austria) Eike Angermayr (Austria) Horst Felbermayr Jr. (Norway) Mads Siljehaug	(Germany) No. 724 Reiter Engineering		10	5	19	7			81
3	(Switzerland) Nicolas Nobs	(France) No. 712 Vortex V8		23	19		22			65
3	(Switzerland) Nicolas Nobs	(France) No. 701 Vortex V8				22		13		65
4	(France) Lionel Amrouche (Switzerland) Karen Gaillard	(France) No. 701 Vortex V8	35	30			21			56
5	(United States) Nicolai Elghanayan	(Germany) No. 724 Reiter Engineering		10	5	19				52
6	(Lithuania) Audrius Butkevicius (Lithuania) Paulius Paskevicius	(Lithuania) No. 720 Siauliai - RD Signs racing team		32				10		32
7	(Netherlands) Ivo Breukers (Netherlands) Luc Breukers	(Netherlands) Red Camel-Jordans.nl				23	15			31
8	(France) Boris Gimond	(France) No. 701 Vortex V8		30						31
8	(France) Boris Gimond	(France) No. 712 Vortex V8					22			31
9	(France) Philippe Gruau	(France) No. 701 Vortex V8			15		21			29
10	(United States) Gregg Gorski (United States) Oscar Lee (Germany) Fidel Leib (Switzerland) Kurt Thiel (United States) Gerhard Watzinger	(Germany) No. 710 Leipert Motorsport	13							28
11	(Netherlands) Peter Kox	(Germany) No. 725 Reiter Engineering				Ret				26
11	(Netherlands) Peter Kox	(Austria) No. 716 True Racing					10			26
11	(Austria) Reinhard Kofler (Portugal) Miguel Oliveira (Austria) Ferdinand Stuck	(Austria) No. 716 True Racing					10			26
12	(France) Pierre Fontaine	(France) No. 712 Vortex V8		23	19					24
13	(United Arab Emirates) Bashar Mardini (Netherlands) Thierry Vermeulen	(Netherlands) Red Camel-Jordans.nl					15			24
14	(France) Alban Varutti	(France) No. 701 Vortex V8	35							22
15	(Austria) Klaus Angerhofer (Slovakia) Štefan Rosina (Austria) Sehdi Sarmini (Austria) Hubert Trunkenpolz	(Austria) No. 717 True Racing					20			21
16	(Germany) Georg Goder (Germany) Ralf Oehme (Germany) Tim Scheerbarth (Germany) Martin Schlüter	(Germany) No. 719 9und11 Racing				12				18
16	(Italy) Nicola Michelon	(Lithuania) No. 720 Siauliai - RD Signs racing team						10		18
17	(France) Franck Leone-Provost	(France) No. 701 Vortex V8					21			18
18	(Lithuania) Justas Jonušis (Slovakia) Miro Konôpka (Slovakia) Mat'o Konopka (Slovakia) Zdeno Mikulasko (Estonia) Thomas Padovani	(Slovakia) No. 707 ARC Bratislava	36†							16
19	(Switzerland) Gilles Curtious	(France) No. 701 Vortex V8						13		15
19	(Belgium) Gilles Smits (Belgium) Jaxon Verhoeven (Netherlands) Jean-Pierre Verhoeven	(Belgium) No. 979 Speed Lover			8					15
20	(France) Sebastian Lajoux	(France) No. 712 Vortex V8					22			15
21	(Lithuania) Ramunas Capkauskas (Lithuania) Egidijus Gutaravicius	(Lithuania) No. 720 Siauliai - RD Signs racing team		32						14
22	(France) Bastien Gouret	(France) No. 701 Vortex V8			15	22				11
23	(France) Olivier Gomez	(France) No. 701 Vortex V8			15					11
23	(France) Arnaud Gomez	(France) No. 701 Vortex V8				22				11
24	(Poland) Pawel Kowalski (Poland) Andrzej Lewandowski (Poland) Rafal Mikrut (Poland) Grzegorz Moczulski (Poland) Bartosz Opiola	No. 708 GT 3 Poland	39							10
25	(Netherlands) Rik Breukers	(Netherlands) Red Camel-Jordans.nl				23				7
	(Canada) Ray Calvin (Germany) Matthias Hoffsümmer (Luxembourg) Gabriele Rindone	(Germany) No. 710 Leipert Motorsport		Ret						0
	(Czech Republic) Erik Janiš (Czech Republic) Petr Lisa (United Kingdom) JM Littman (Czech Republic) Tomáš Miniberger (Czech Republic) Sergej Pavlovec	(Czech Republic) No. 718 RTR Projects					Ret			0
	(Italy) Massimo Abbati (Italy) Stefano D'Aste (Italy) Daniel Grimaldi (Monaco) Vito Utzieri	(Italy) No. 726 Lotus PB Racing		Ret						0
	(Netherlands) Peter Kox (Netherlands) Nico Pronk (Netherlands) Dennis Retera	(Germany) No. 725 Reiter Engineering				Ret				0
Pos.	Drivers	Team	(United Arab Emirates) DUB	(Italy) MUG	(France) LEC	(Germany) HOC	(Spain) BAR	(Hungary) HUN	(United States) SEB	Pts.

† – Drivers did not finish the race, but were classified as they completed over 60% of the class winner's race distance.

==== GTX Teams' ====
Pos.	Team	(United Arab Emirates) DUB	(Italy) MUG	(France) LEC	(Germany) HOC	(Spain) BAR	(Hungary) HUN	(United States) SEB	Pts.
1	(France) No. 701 Vortex V8	35	30	15	22	22	13		93
2	(Germany) No. 724 Reiter Engineering		10	5	19	7			81
3	(France) No. 712 Vortex V8		23	19		21			39
4	(Lithuania) No. 720 Siauliai - RD Signs racing team		32				10		32
5	(Netherlands) Red Camel-Jordans.nl				23	15			31
6	(Germany) No. 710 Leipert Motorsport	13	Ret						28
7	(Austria) No. 716 True Racing					10			26
8	(Austria) No. 717 True Racing					20			21
9	(Germany) No. 719 9und11 Racing				12				18
10	(Slovakia) No. 707 ARC Bratislava	36†							16
11	(Belgium) No. 979 Speed Lover			8					15
12	No. 708 GT 3 Poland	39							10
	(Czech Republic) No. 718 RTR Projects					Ret			0
	(Italy) No. 726 Lotus PB Racing		Ret						0
	(Germany) No. 725 Reiter Engineering				Ret				0
Pos.	Team	(United Arab Emirates) DUB	(Italy) MUG	(France) LEC	(Germany) HOC	(Spain) BAR	(Hungary) HUN	(United States) SEB	Pts.

† – Drivers did not finish the race, but were classified as they completed over 60% of the class winner's race distance.

==== 991 Drivers' ====
Pos.	Drivers	Team	(United Arab Emirates) DUB	(Italy) MUG	(France) LEC	(Germany) HOC	(Spain) BAR	(Hungary) HUN	(United States) SEB	Pts.
1	(Russia) Andrey Mukovoz (Russia) Sergey Peregudov (Russia) Stanislav Sidoruk	(Luxembourg) No. 909 DUWO Racing	14	21	14	10	11			91
2	(Italy) Fabrizio Broggi (Italy) Sabino de Castro (Romania) Sergiu Nicolae	(Italy) No. 955 Willi Motorsport by Ebimotors		12		11	8	5		79
3	(Netherlands) Gijs Bessem (Netherlands) Harry Hilders	(Netherlands) No. 991 NKPP Racing by Bas Koeten Racing	12			9				46
4	(Belgium) Olivier Dons	(Belgium) No. 978 Speed Lover	41†		17		25			45
5	(Russia) Merabi Mekvabishvili	(Germany) No. 924 Nebulus Racing by Huber (Germany) No. 924 PROFILDOORS by Huber Racing	40†	14						37
6	(United Arab Emirates) Saif Alameri	(Germany) No. 989 MRS GT-Racing (United Arab Emirates) No. 989 RABDAN by MRS GT-Racing	32			26	Ret			34
7	(Netherlands) Bob Herber (Netherlands) Roeland Voerman	(Netherlands) No. 991 NKPP Racing by Bas Koeten Racing	12							29
8	(Luxembourg) Dylan Pereira	(Luxembourg) No. 909 DUWO Racing	14							26
9	(Russia) Nikolai Gadetsky	(Germany) No. 929 HRT Performance	Ret							26
9	(Russia) Nikolai Gadetsky	(Germany) No. 924 PROFILDOORS by Huber Racing		14						26
9	(Russia) Nikolai Gadetsky	(Germany) No. 989 MRS GT-Racing (United Arab Emirates) No. 989 RABDAN by MRS GT-Racing				26	Ret			26
10	(Netherlands) Jeroen Bleekemolen (Finland) Jukka Honkavuori (United States) Tim Pappas	(Germany) No. 989 MRS GT-Racing	32							24
Pos.	Drivers	Team	(United Arab Emirates) DUB	(Italy) MUG	(France) LEC	(Germany) HOC	(Spain) BAR	(Hungary) HUN	(United States) SEB	Pts.

† – Drivers did not finish the race, but were classified as they completed over 60% of the class winner's race distance.

==== 991 Teams' ====
Pos.	Team	(United Arab Emirates) DUB	(Italy) MUG	(France) LEC	(Germany) HOC	(Spain) BAR	(Hungary) HUN	(United States) SEB	Pts.
1	(Luxembourg) No. 909 DUWO Racing	14	21	14	10	11			91
2	(Italy) No. 955 Willi Motorsport by Ebimotors		12		11	8	5		79
3	(Netherlands) No. 991 NKPP Racing by Bas Koeten Racing	12			9				46
4	(Belgium) No. 978 Speed Lover	41†		17		25			45
5	(Germany) No. 924 Nebulus Racing by Huber (Germany) No. 924 PROFILDOORS by Huber Racing	40†	14						37
6	(Germany) No. 989 MRS GT-Racing (United Arab Emirates) No. 989 RABDAN by MRS GT-Racing	32			26	Ret			34
7	(Netherlands) No. 925 Bas Koeten Racing				8				19
8	(France) No. 911 Porsche Lorient Racing			7					18
9	(Lithuania) No. 910 Juta Racing		13						17
10	(Italy) No. 973 Ebimotors		19						14
Pos.	Team	(United Arab Emirates) DUB	(Italy) MUG	(France) LEC	(Germany) HOC	(Spain) BAR	(Hungary) HUN	(United States) SEB	Pts.

† – Drivers did not finish the race, but were classified as they completed over 60% of the class winner's race distance.

==== GT4 Drivers' ====
Pos.	Drivers	Team	(United Arab Emirates) DUB	(Italy) MUG	(France) LEC	(Germany) HOC	(Spain) BAR	(Hungary) HUN	(United States) SEB	Pts.
1	(United States) Chandler Hull (United States) Jon Miller (Canada) Samantha Tan	(Canada) No. 438 ST Racing	15	29	Ret	25†	12	11		104
2	(Canada) Nick Wittmer	(Canada) No. 438 ST Racing	15			25†	12			71
3	(Belgium) Rodrigue Gillion (Belgium) Nico Verdonck	(Germany) No. 401 PROsport Performance AMR	16		20	17				58
4	(Belgium) Kurt Hensen	(Germany) No. 401 PROsport Performance AMR			20	17				36
5	(Belgium) Stéphane Lémeret (Denmark) Patrik Matthiesen (Austria) Constantin Schöll	(Germany) No. 401 PROsport Performance AMR	16							22
5	(United Kingdom) Nathan Freke (United States) Daren Jorgensen (United States) Brett Strom (Netherlands) Danny van Dongen	(United States) No. 450 RHC Jorgensen-Strom by Century					12			22
6	(Netherlands) Christian de Kant (Italy) Alessandro Fogliani (Germany) Thomas Herbst (Switzerland) Valerio Presezzi (Italy) Antonio Spavone	(Switzerland) No. 412 Centri Porsche Ticino		26						18
7	(United Kingdom) Adam Christodoulou (United Kingdom) Ollie Hancock (United Kingdom) John Hartshorne (Russia) Denis Remenyako	(United Arab Emirates) No. 488 Dragon Racing	20							16
7	(United States) Lisa Clark (United States) Mark Issa (United States) Jeff Westphal	(Germany) No. 499 Car Collection Motorsport					24			16
8	(United Kingdom) Matt Brookes (Portugal) Luis Calheiros (Portugal) Paulo Macedo (Portugal) JJ Magalhães (Portugal) José Pires	(Germany) No. 452 Team Avia Sorg Rennsport	21							10
9	(Mozambique) Rodrigo Almeida (France) Gilles Lallement (United States) Vincent Piemonte (Denmark) Thomas Sørensen (France) Gilles Vannelet	(France) No. 451 3Y Technology	33							4
Pos.	Drivers	Team	(United Arab Emirates) DUB	(Italy) MUG	(France) LEC	(Germany) HOC	(Spain) BAR	(Hungary) HUN	(United States) SEB	Pts.

† – Drivers did not finish the race, but were classified as they completed over 60% of the class winner's race distance.

==== GT4 Teams' ====
Pos.	Team	(United Arab Emirates) DUB	(Italy) MUG	(France) LEC	(Germany) HOC	(Spain) BAR	(Hungary) HUN	(United States) SEB	Pts.
1	(Canada) No. 438 ST Racing	15	29	Ret	25†	12	11		104
2	(Germany) No. 401 PROsport Performance AMR	16		20	17				58
3	(United States) No. 450 RHC Jorgensen-Strom by Century					17			22
4	(Switzerland) No. 412 Centri Porsche Ticino		26						18
5	(United Arab Emirates) No. 488 Dragon Racing	20							16
5	(Germany) No. 499 Car Collection Motorsport					24			16
6	(Germany) No. 452 Team Avia Sorg Rennsport	21							10
6	(France) No. 451 3Y Technology	33							7
Pos.	Team	(United Arab Emirates) DUB	(Italy) MUG	(France) LEC	(Germany) HOC	(Spain) BAR	(Hungary) HUN	(United States) SEB	Pts.

† – Drivers did not finish the race, but were classified as they completed over 60% of the class winner's race distance.

== See also ==
- 24H Series
