= 2020 24H GT Series =

The 2020 24H GT Series powered by Hankook was the sixth season of the 24H Series with drivers battling for championship points and titles and the eleventh season since Creventic, the organiser and promoter of the series, organised multiple races a year. The races were contested with GT3-spec cars, GT4-spec cars, sports cars and 24H-Specials, like silhouette cars.

== Calendar ==
Round	Event	Circuit	Date	Report
1	Dubai 24 Hour	Dubai Autodrome, Dubai, United Arab Emirates	9–11 January	Report
2	24 Hours of Portimão	Algarve International Circuit, Portimão, Portugal	12–14 June	Report
3	12 Hours of Monza	Autodromo Nazionale di Monza, Monza, Italy	10–11 July	Report
4	16 Hours of Hockenheimring	Hockenheimring, Hockenheim, Germany	4–6 September	Report
5	Coppa Florio 12 Hours of Sicily	Autodromo di Pergusa, Pergusa, Italy	9–11 October	Report
6	12 Hours of Mugello	Mugello Circuit, Scarperia e San Piero, Italy	13–15 November	Report
Cancelled due to the COVID-19 pandemic
Event		Circuit		Original Date
12 Hours of Spa-Francorchamps		Circuit de Spa-Francorchamps, Spa, Belgium		1-2 May
9 Hours of Castellet		Circuit Paul Ricard, Le Castellet, France		9-10 July
24 Hours of Barcelona		Circuit de Barcelona-Catalunya, Montmeló, Spain		4-6 September
12 Hours of Imola		Autodromo Enzo e Dino Ferrari, Imola, Italy		9-10 October
24 Hours of the Circuit of the Americas		Circuit of the Americas, Austin, United States		13-15 November
12 Hours of Zandvoort		Circuit Zandvoort, Zandvoort, Netherlands		13-15 November

Race is part of the Championship of the Continents
Race is part of the European Championship
Race is part of both the Championship of the Continents and the European Championship

NOTE: The Austin round date was originally scheduled for 13-15 November, but after COVID-19 forced the postponement of the MotoGP round in Austin, that race was rescheduled to the date originally planned for 24H . Creventic and the circuit will announce a rescheduled date.

== Entry list ==
GT3
Team	Car	No.	Drivers	Class	Rounds
(Germany) Black Falcon	Mercedes-AMG GT3	4	(United Arab Emirates) Khaled Al Qubaisi	P	1
(Germany) Black Falcon	Mercedes-AMG GT3	4	(United Kingdom) Ben Barker	P	1
(Germany) Black Falcon	Mercedes-AMG GT3	4	(Netherlands) Jeroen Bleekemolen	P	1
(Germany) Black Falcon	Mercedes-AMG GT3	4	(Germany) Hubert Haupt	P	1
(Germany) Black Falcon	Mercedes-AMG GT3	4	(Germany) Manuel Metzger	P	1
(Saudi Arabia) (Belgium) / MS7 by WRT (Note: Car No. 7 entered as WS7 by WRT and cars No. 31 entered as Belgian Audi Club Team WRT.); (Saudi Arabia) (Belgium) / Belgian Audi Club Team WRT	Audi R8 LMS Evo	7	(Saudi Arabia) Mohammed Saud Fahad Al Saud	P	1
(Saudi Arabia) (Belgium) / MS7 by WRT; (Saudi Arabia) (Belgium) / Belgian Audi Club Team WRT	Audi R8 LMS Evo	7	(Germany) Christopher Mies	P	1
(Saudi Arabia) (Belgium) / MS7 by WRT; (Saudi Arabia) (Belgium) / Belgian Audi Club Team WRT	Audi R8 LMS Evo	7	(Belgium) Dries Vanthoor	P	1
(Saudi Arabia) (Belgium) / MS7 by WRT; (Saudi Arabia) (Belgium) / Belgian Audi Club Team WRT	Audi R8 LMS Evo	7	(Netherlands) Michael Vergers	P	1
(Saudi Arabia) (Belgium) / MS7 by WRT; (Saudi Arabia) (Belgium) / Belgian Audi Club Team WRT	Audi R8 LMS Evo	7	(Netherlands) Rik Breukers	P	1
(Saudi Arabia) (Belgium) / MS7 by WRT; (Saudi Arabia) (Belgium) / Belgian Audi Club Team WRT	Audi R8 LMS Evo	31	(Italy) Mirko Bortolotti	P	1
(Saudi Arabia) (Belgium) / MS7 by WRT; (Saudi Arabia) (Belgium) / Belgian Audi Club Team WRT	Audi R8 LMS Evo	31	(Switzerland) Mark Ineichen	P	1
(Saudi Arabia) (Belgium) / MS7 by WRT; (Saudi Arabia) (Belgium) / Belgian Audi Club Team WRT	Audi R8 LMS Evo	31	(Switzerland) Rolf Ineichen	P	1
(Saudi Arabia) (Belgium) / MS7 by WRT; (Saudi Arabia) (Belgium) / Belgian Audi Club Team WRT	Audi R8 LMS Evo	31	(South Africa) Kelvin van der Linde	P	1
(Saudi Arabia) (Belgium) / MS7 by WRT; (Saudi Arabia) (Belgium) / Belgian Audi Club Team WRT	Audi R8 LMS Evo	31	(Netherlands) Michael Vergers	P	1
(Italy) Dinamic Motorsport	Porsche 911 GT3 R	7	(Switzerland) Mauro Calamia	P	5
(Italy) Dinamic Motorsport	Porsche 911 GT3 R	7	(Italy) Matteo Malucelli	P	5
(Italy) Dinamic Motorsport	Porsche 911 GT3 R	7	(Switzerland) Stefano Monaco	P	5
(Italy) Dinamic Motorsport	Porsche 911 GT3 R	7	(Italy) Roberto Pampanini	P	5
(Italy) Dinamic Motorsport	Porsche 911 GT3 R	28	(Switzerland) Mauro Calamia	Am	1
(Italy) Dinamic Motorsport	Porsche 911 GT3 R	28	(Denmark) Mikkel O. Pedersen	Am	1
(Italy) Dinamic Motorsport	Porsche 911 GT3 R	28	(Switzerland) Ivan Jacoma	Am	1
(Italy) Dinamic Motorsport	Porsche 911 GT3 R	28	(Switzerland) Stefano Monaco	Am	1
(Italy) Dinamic Motorsport	Porsche 911 GT3 R	28	(Italy) Roberto Pampanini	Am	1
(Italy) Dinamic Motorsport	Porsche 911 GT3 R	29	(United Arab Emirates) Bashar Mardini	Am	1
(Italy) Dinamic Motorsport	Porsche 911 GT3 R	29	(Austria) Helmut Rödig	Am	1
(Italy) Dinamic Motorsport	Porsche 911 GT3 R	29	(Austria) Philipp Sager	Am	1
(Italy) Dinamic Motorsport	Porsche 911 GT3 R	29	(Austria) Christopher Zöchling	Am	1
(Italy) Dinamic Motorsport	Lamborghini Huracán Super Trofeo Evo	793	(Switzerland) Stefano Monaco	P	5
(Italy) Dinamic Motorsport	Lamborghini Huracán Super Trofeo Evo	793	(Italy) Amedeo Pampanini	P	5
(Italy) Dinamic Motorsport	Lamborghini Huracán Super Trofeo Evo	793	(Switzerland) Nicolas Sturzinger	P	5
(Italy) Dinamic Motorsport	Lamborghini Huracán Super Trofeo Evo	794	(Switzerland) Mauro Calamia	P	5
(Italy) Dinamic Motorsport	Lamborghini Huracán Super Trofeo Evo	794	(Italy) Roberto Pampanini	P	5
(Italy) Dinamic Motorsport	Lamborghini Huracán Super Trofeo Evo	794	(Switzerland) Nicolas Sturzinger	P	5
(Netherlands) Equipe Verschuur	Renault R.S. 01 F GT3	9	(Netherlands) Harrie Kolen	Am	3–4
(Netherlands) Equipe Verschuur	Renault R.S. 01 F GT3	9	(Netherlands) Erik van Loon	Am	3–4
(Netherlands) Equipe Verschuur	Renault R.S. 01 F GT3	9	(Netherlands) Mike Verschuur	Am	3–4
(Germany) SPS Automotive Performance	Mercedes-AMG GT3 Evo	10	(Germany) Lance-David Arnold	P	1
(Germany) SPS Automotive Performance	Mercedes-AMG GT3 Evo	10	(Austria) Dominik Baumann	P	1
(Germany) SPS Automotive Performance	Mercedes-AMG GT3 Evo	10	(United Kingdom) Tom Onslow-Cole	P	1
(Germany) SPS Automotive Performance	Mercedes-AMG GT3 Evo	10	(Germany) Valentin Pierburg	P	1
(Netherlands) MP Motorsport	Mercedes-AMG GT3	19	(Netherlands) Henk de Jong	Am	1, 5
(Netherlands) MP Motorsport	Mercedes-AMG GT3	19	(Netherlands) Jaap van Lagen	Am	1, 5
(Netherlands) MP Motorsport	Mercedes-AMG GT3	19	(Netherlands) Bert de Heus	Am	1
(Netherlands) MP Motorsport	Mercedes-AMG GT3	19	(Netherlands) Daniël de Jong	Am	1
(Netherlands) MP Motorsport	Mercedes-AMG GT3	19	(Netherlands) Rik Breukers	Am	5
(Germany) Wochenspiegel Team Monschau	Ferrari 488 GT3	22	(Germany) Jochen Krumbach	Am	3
(Germany) Wochenspiegel Team Monschau	Ferrari 488 GT3	22	(Germany) Hendrik Still	Am	3
(Germany) Wochenspiegel Team Monschau	Ferrari 488 GT3	22	(Germany) Georg Weiss	Am	3
(Germany) Wochenspiegel Team Monschau	Ferrari 488 GT3	22	(Germany) Leonard Weiss	Am	3
(United Arab Emirates) GPX Racing	Porsche 911 GT3 R	24	(France) Julien Andlauer	P	1
(United Arab Emirates) GPX Racing	Porsche 911 GT3 R	24	(United Arab Emirates) Frédéric Fatien	P	1
(United Arab Emirates) GPX Racing	Porsche 911 GT3 R	24	(South Africa) Jordan Grogor	P	1
(United Arab Emirates) GPX Racing	Porsche 911 GT3 R	24	(United Kingdom) Stuart Hall	P	1
(United Arab Emirates) GPX Racing	Porsche 911 GT3 R	24	(Germany) Dirk Werner	P	1
(United Arab Emirates) GPX Racing	Porsche 911 GT3 R	36	(United Arab Emirates) Frédéric Fatien	P	5
(United Arab Emirates) GPX Racing	Porsche 911 GT3 R	36	(South Africa) Jordan Grogor	P	5
(United Arab Emirates) GPX Racing	Porsche 911 GT3 R	36	(France) Mathieu Jaminet	P	5
(United Arab Emirates) GPX Racing	Porsche 911 GT3 R	36	(Germany) Robert Renauer	P	5
(France) Saintéloc Racing	Audi R8 LMS Evo	26	(France) Michael Blanchemain	Am	1
(France) Saintéloc Racing	Audi R8 LMS Evo	26	(France) Daniel Desbrueres	Am	1
(France) Saintéloc Racing	Audi R8 LMS Evo	26	(Luxembourg) Christian Kelders	Am	1
(France) Saintéloc Racing	Audi R8 LMS Evo	26	(France) Steven Palette	Am	1
(France) Saintéloc Racing	Audi R8 LMS Evo	26	(Belgium) Pierre-Yves Paque	Am	1
(Germany) Car Collection Motorsport	Audi R8 LMS Evo	34	(Germany) Johannes Dr. Kirchhoff	Am	1, 3
(Germany) Car Collection Motorsport	Audi R8 LMS Evo	34	(Germany) Elmar Grimm	Am	1, 3
(Germany) Car Collection Motorsport	Audi R8 LMS Evo	34	(Germany) Gustav Edelhoff	Am	1
(Germany) Car Collection Motorsport	Audi R8 LMS Evo	34	(Germany) Ingo Vogler	Am	1
(Germany) Car Collection Motorsport	Audi R8 LMS Evo	34	(Germany) Max Edelhoff	Am	3
(Germany) Car Collection Motorsport	Audi R8 LMS Evo	88	(Netherlands) Rik Breukers	P	1
(Germany) Car Collection Motorsport	Audi R8 LMS Evo	88	(Germany) Christopher Haase	P	1
(Germany) Car Collection Motorsport	Audi R8 LMS Evo	88	(Germany) Dimitri Parhofer	P	1
(Germany) Car Collection Motorsport	Audi R8 LMS Evo	88	(Germany) Mike-David Ortmann	P	1
(Germany) Car Collection Motorsport	Audi R8 LMS Evo	88	(Germany) Markus Winkelhock	P	1
(Germany) Car Collection Motorsport	Audi R8 LMS Evo	88	(Austria) Michael Doppelmayr	P	5
(Germany) Car Collection Motorsport	Audi R8 LMS Evo	88	(Germany) Elia Erhart	P	5
(Germany) Car Collection Motorsport	Audi R8 LMS Evo	88	(Germany) Pierre Kaffer	P	5
(Germany) Car Collection Motorsport	Audi R8 LMS Evo	88	(Germany) Hendrik Still	P	5
(Italy) MP Racing	Mercedes-AMG GT3 Evo	58	(Italy) Corinna Gostner	Am	3, 5–6
(Italy) MP Racing	Mercedes-AMG GT3 Evo	58	(Italy) David Gostner	Am	3, 5–6
(Italy) MP Racing	Mercedes-AMG GT3 Evo	58	(Italy) Thomas Gostner	Am	3, 5–6
(Italy) MP Racing	Mercedes-AMG GT3 Evo	58	(Italy) Manuela Gostner	Am	3, 6
(Italy) MP Racing	Mercedes-AMG GT3 Evo	58	(Italy) Giorgio Sernagiotto	Am	3
Team Hong Kong Craft-Bamboo Racing	Mercedes-AMG GT3	69	(Hong Kong) Antares Au	Am	1
Team Hong Kong Craft-Bamboo Racing	Mercedes-AMG GT3	69	(Hong Kong) Jonathan Hui	Am	1
Team Hong Kong Craft-Bamboo Racing	Mercedes-AMG GT3	69	(Macau) Kevin Tse	Am	1
Team Hong Kong Craft-Bamboo Racing	Mercedes-AMG GT3	69	(Hong Kong) Frank Yu	Am	1
(Germany) Toksport WRT	Mercedes-AMG GT3	70	(Austria) Alexander Hrachowina	Am	1
(Germany) Toksport WRT	Mercedes-AMG GT3	70	(United States) George Kurtz	Am	1
(Germany) Toksport WRT	Mercedes-AMG GT3	70	(Zimbabwe) Axcil Jefferies	Am	1
(Germany) Toksport WRT	Mercedes-AMG GT3	70	(United Kingdom) Finlay Hutchison	Am	1
(Germany) Toksport WRT	Mercedes-AMG GT3	70	(Austria) Martin Konrad	Am	1
(Germany) Toksport WRT	Mercedes-AMG GT3	777	(Austria) Martin Konrad	P	1
(Germany) Toksport WRT	Mercedes-AMG GT3	777	(Germany) Patrick Assenheimer	P	1
(Germany) Toksport WRT	Mercedes-AMG GT3	777	(United Kingdom) Philip Ellis	P	1
(Germany) Toksport WRT	Mercedes-AMG GT3	777	(Germany) Maro Engel	P	1
(Germany) Toksport WRT	Mercedes-AMG GT3	777	(Germany) Luca Stolz	P	1
(United Kingdom) Barwell Motorsport	Lamborghini Huracán GT3 Evo	77	(Switzerland) Adrian Amstutz	P	1
(United Kingdom) Barwell Motorsport	Lamborghini Huracán GT3 Evo	77	(Finland) Patrick Kujala	P	1
(United Kingdom) Barwell Motorsport	Lamborghini Huracán GT3 Evo	77	(Denmark) Dennis Lind	P	1
(United Kingdom) Barwell Motorsport	Lamborghini Huracán GT3 Evo	77	(United Kingdom) Jordan Witt	P	1
(Germany) HTP Winward Motorsport	Mercedes-AMG GT3	84	(Netherlands) Indy Dontje	Am	1
(Germany) HTP Winward Motorsport	Mercedes-AMG GT3	84	(Oman) Al Faisal Al Zubair	Am	1
(Germany) HTP Winward Motorsport	Mercedes-AMG GT3	84	(Germany) Maximilian Buhk	Am	1
(Germany) HTP Winward Motorsport	Mercedes-AMG GT3	84	(Germany) Christopher Bruck	Am	1
(Germany) HTP Winward Motorsport	Mercedes-AMG GT3	84	(Germany) Maximilian Götz	Am	1
(Germany) HTP Winward Motorsport	Mercedes-AMG GT3	84	(Netherlands) Indy Dontje	P	2
(Germany) HTP Winward Motorsport	Mercedes-AMG GT3	84	(United Kingdom) Philip Ellis	P	2
(Germany) HTP Winward Motorsport	Mercedes-AMG GT3	84	(United States) Bryce Ward	P	2
(Germany) HTP Winward Motorsport	Mercedes-AMG GT3	84	(United States) Russell Ward	P	2
(United States) CP Racing	Mercedes-AMG GT3 Evo	85	(United States) Charles Espenlaub	Am	1, 4–6
(United States) CP Racing	Mercedes-AMG GT3 Evo	85	(United States) Shane Lewis	Am	1, 4–6
(United States) CP Racing	Mercedes-AMG GT3 Evo	85	(United States) Charles Putman	Am	1, 4–6
(United States) CP Racing	Mercedes-AMG GT3 Evo	85	(United States) Mike Hedlund	Am	1
(United States) CP Racing	Mercedes-AMG GT3 Evo	85	(United States) Joe Foster	Am	4–5
(Germany) Herberth Motorsport	Porsche 911 GT3 R	91	(Germany) Ralf Bohn	P	1–3, 6
(Germany) Herberth Motorsport	Porsche 911 GT3 R	91	(Germany) Robert Renauer	P	1–3, 6
(Germany) Herberth Motorsport	Porsche 911 GT3 R	91	(Germany) Alfred Renauer	P	1–3
(Germany) Herberth Motorsport	Porsche 911 GT3 R	91	(Germany) Sven Müller	P	1
(Germany) Herberth Motorsport	Porsche 911 GT3 R	91	(Switzerland) Daniel Allemann	P	2–3, 6
(Germany) Herberth Motorsport	Porsche 911 GT3 R	92	(Germany) Jürgen Häring	Am	2–3, 5
(Germany) Herberth Motorsport	Porsche 911 GT3 R	92	(Greece) Taki Konstantinou	Am	2–3, 5
(Germany) Herberth Motorsport	Porsche 911 GT3 R	92	(Germany) Tim Müller	Am	2, 5
(Germany) Herberth Motorsport	Porsche 911 GT3 R	92	(Germany) Marco Seefried	Am	2
(Germany) Herberth Motorsport	Porsche 911 GT3 R	92	(Germany) Michael Joos	Am	2
(Germany) Herberth Motorsport	Porsche 911 GT3 R	92	(Germany) Alfred Renauer	Am	3, 5–6
(Germany) Herberth Motorsport	Porsche 911 GT3 R	92	(Germany) Max Edelhoff	Am	6
(Germany) Herberth Motorsport	Porsche 911 GT3 R	92	(Germany) Vincent Kolb	Am	6
(Germany) Herberth Motorsport	Porsche 911 GT3 R	92	(Germany) Robert Renauer	Am	6
(Germany) Herberth Motorsport	Porsche 911 GT3 R	93	(Germany) Stefan Aust	Am	3
(Germany) Herberth Motorsport	Porsche 911 GT3 R	93	(Austria) Klaus Bachler	Am	3
(Germany) Herberth Motorsport	Porsche 911 GT3 R	93	(Germany) Steffen Görig	Am	3
(New Zealand) Earl Bamber Motorsport	Porsche 911 GT3 R	95	(New Zealand) Will Bamber	Am	1
(New Zealand) Earl Bamber Motorsport	Porsche 911 GT3 R	95	(Germany) Jürgen Häring	Am	1
(New Zealand) Earl Bamber Motorsport	Porsche 911 GT3 R	95	(Spain) Gérard López	Am	1
(New Zealand) Earl Bamber Motorsport	Porsche 911 GT3 R	95	(Luxembourg) Eric Lux	Am	1
(New Zealand) Earl Bamber Motorsport	Porsche 911 GT3 R	95	(Germany) Tim Müller	Am	1
(Germany) Attempto Racing	Audi R8 LMS Evo	99	(Netherlands) Luc Braams	P	1
(Germany) Attempto Racing	Audi R8 LMS Evo	99	(Netherlands) Max Braams	P	1
(Germany) Attempto Racing	Audi R8 LMS Evo	99	(Netherlands) Duncan Huisman	P	1
(Germany) Attempto Racing	Audi R8 LMS Evo	99	(Austria) Nicolas Schöll	P	1
(Germany) Attempto Racing	Audi R8 LMS Evo	99	(Italy) Mattia Drudi	P	1
(Lithuania) RD Signs Racing Team	Lamborghini Huracán Super Trofeo	720	(Latvia) Arturs Batraks	Am	6
(Lithuania) RD Signs Racing Team	Lamborghini Huracán Super Trofeo	720	(Lithuania) Audrius Butkevicius	Am	6
(Lithuania) RD Signs Racing Team	Lamborghini Huracán Super Trofeo	720	(Lithuania) Martynas Griska	Am	6
(Lithuania) RD Signs Racing Team	Lamborghini Huracán Super Trofeo	720	(Lithuania) Egidijus Gutaravicius	Am	6
GTX
Team	Car	No.	Drivers	Rounds	
(France) Vortex V8	Vortex 1.0 GTX	201	(France) Julien Boillot	1	
(France) Vortex V8	Vortex 1.0 GTX	201	(France) Philippe Bonnel	1	
(France) Vortex V8	Vortex 1.0 GTX	201	(France) Arnaud Gomez	1	
(France) Vortex V8	Vortex 1.0 GTX	201	(France) Olivier Gomez	1	
(Netherlands) JR Motorsport	BMW M3 F80	703	(Netherlands) Ruud Olij	3	
(Netherlands) JR Motorsport	BMW M3 F80	703	(Netherlands) Ted van Vliet	3	
(Italy) Lotus PB Racing	Lotus Exige V6 Cup R	705	(Italy) Stefano D'Aste	1	
(Italy) Lotus PB Racing	Lotus Exige V6 Cup R	705	(Italy) Enrico Riccardi	1	
(Italy) Lotus PB Racing	Lotus Exige V6 Cup R	705	(Italy) Luciano Tarabini	1	
(Italy) Lotus PB Racing	Lotus Exige V6 Cup R	705	(Monaco) Vito Utzieri	1	
(Slovakia) ARC Bratislava	Lamborghini Huracán Super Trofeo	707	(Slovakia) Maťo Homola	3	
(Slovakia) ARC Bratislava	Lamborghini Huracán Super Trofeo	707	(Slovakia) Miro Konôpka	3	
(Slovakia) ARC Bratislava	Lamborghini Huracán Super Trofeo	707	(Slovakia) Mat'o Konôpka	3	
(Germany) Leipert Motorsport	Lamborghini Huracán Super Trofeo Evo	710	(United States) Gregg Gorski	1	
(Germany) Leipert Motorsport	Lamborghini Huracán Super Trofeo Evo	710	(United Kingdom) JM Littman	1	
(Germany) Leipert Motorsport	Lamborghini Huracán Super Trofeo Evo	710	(Luxembourg) Yury Wagner	1	
(Germany) Leipert Motorsport	Lamborghini Huracán Super Trofeo Evo	710	(United States) Gerhard Watzinger	1	
(Germany) Leipert Motorsport	Lamborghini Huracán Super Trofeo Evo	710	(France) Tom Dillmann	1	
(Germany) Proton Competition	Porsche 911 RSR	711	(United States) Dominique Bastien	4	
(Germany) Proton Competition	Porsche 911 RSR	711	(Thailand) Vutthikorn Inthraphuvasak	4	
(Germany) Proton Competition	Porsche 911 RSR	711	(Germany) Christian Ried	4	
(Netherlands) Cor Euser Racing	MARC II V8	717	(Netherlands) Cor Euser	1	
(Netherlands) Cor Euser Racing	MARC II V8	717	(Hong Kong) Nigel Farmer	1	
(Netherlands) Cor Euser Racing	MARC II V8	717	(Malaysia) Keong Liam Lim	1	
(Netherlands) Cor Euser Racing	MARC II V8	717	(Netherlands) Richard Verburg	1	
(Netherlands) Cor Euser Racing	MARC II V8	717	(Norway) Einar Thorsen	1	
(Lithuania) RD Signs Racing Team	Lamborghini Huracán Super Trofeo Evo	720	(Latvia) Artūrs Batraks	6	
(Lithuania) RD Signs Racing Team	Lamborghini Huracán Super Trofeo Evo	720	(Lithuania) Audrius Butkevičius	6	
(Lithuania) RD Signs Racing Team	Lamborghini Huracán Super Trofeo Evo	720	(Lithuania) Martynas Griska	6	
(Lithuania) RD Signs Racing Team	Lamborghini Huracán Super Trofeo Evo	720	(Lithuania) Egidijus Gutaravičius	6	
(Austria) Reiter Engineering	KTM GTX Concept	746	(Austria) Eike Angermayr	3	
(Austria) Reiter Engineering	KTM GTX Concept	746	(Austria) Laura Kraihamer	3	
(Austria) Reiter Engineering	KTM GTX Concept	746	(Slovakia) Stefan Rosina	3	
(Belgium) QSR Racingschool	Mercedes-AMG GT4	754	(Belgium) Olivier Bertels	1	
(Belgium) QSR Racingschool	Mercedes-AMG GT4	754	(Belgium) Jimmy de Breucker	1	
(Belgium) QSR Racingschool	Mercedes-AMG GT4	754	(Belgium) Michiel Verhaeren	1	
(Belgium) QSR Racingschool	Mercedes-AMG GT4	754	(Belgium) Johnny de Breucker	1	
(Belgium) QSR Racingschool	Mercedes-AMG GT4	754	(Russia) Dmitry Gvazava	1	
(Belgium) VDS Racing Adventures	MARC II V8	758	(Belgium) Patrick Asnong	1	
(Belgium) VDS Racing Adventures	MARC II V8	758	(Australia) Jake Camilleri	1	
(Belgium) VDS Racing Adventures	MARC II V8	758	(Belgium) Nick Geelen	1	
(Belgium) VDS Racing Adventures	MARC II V8	758	(Luxembourg) Hary Putz	1	
(Belgium) VDS Racing Adventures	MARC II V8	758	(Belgium) Raphaël van der Straten	1	
(United Arab Emirates) Dragon Racing	Lamborghini Huracán Super Trofeo Evo	788	(United Kingdom) Adam Balon	1	
(United Arab Emirates) Dragon Racing	Lamborghini Huracán Super Trofeo Evo	788	(United Kingdom) Glynn Geddie	1	
(United Arab Emirates) Dragon Racing	Lamborghini Huracán Super Trofeo Evo	788	(United Kingdom) Jim Geddie	1	
(United Arab Emirates) Dragon Racing	Lamborghini Huracán Super Trofeo Evo	788	(United Kingdom) Phil Keen	1	
PX
Team	Car	No.	Drivers	Rounds	
(Italy) Avelon Formula	Wolf GB08 Tornado	45	(Italy) Ivan Bellarosa	5	
(Italy) Avelon Formula	Wolf GB08 Tornado	45	(Italy) Guglielmo Belotti	5	
991
Team	Car	No.	Drivers	Rounds	
(Germany) TM - Racing.org	Porsche 991 GT3 I Cup	902	(Germany) Harald Geisselhart	1	
(Germany) TM - Racing.org	Porsche 991 GT3 I Cup	902	(Germany) Der Bommel	1	
(Germany) TM - Racing.org	Porsche 991 GT3 I Cup	902	(Germany) Andreas Riedl	1	
(Germany) TM - Racing.org	Porsche 991 GT3 I Cup	902	(Austria) Constantin Scholl	1	
(New Zealand) JFC / LB Living Racing	Porsche 991 GT3 II Cup	904	(New Zealand) Sam Fillmore	1	
(New Zealand) JFC / LB Living Racing	Porsche 991 GT3 II Cup	904	(Australia) Richard Muscat	1	
(New Zealand) JFC / LB Living Racing	Porsche 991 GT3 II Cup	904	(Australia) Daniel Stutterd	1	
(New Zealand) JFC / LB Living Racing	Porsche 991 GT3 II Cup	904	(New Zealand) Andrew Fawcet	1	
(Italy) Dinamic Motorsport	Porsche 991 GT3 II Cup	907	(Italy) Simone Iaquinta	5	
(Italy) Dinamic Motorsport	Porsche 991 GT3 II Cup	907	(Italy) Matteo Malucelli	5	
(Italy) Dinamic Motorsport	Porsche 991 GT3 II Cup	907	(Switzerland) Stefano Monaco	5	
(Italy) Dinamic Motorsport	Porsche 991 GT3 II Cup	907	(Italy) Roberto Pampanini	5	
(Luxembourg) DUWO Racing	Porsche 991 GT3 II Cup	909	(Russia) Andrey Mukovoz	1, 4	
(Luxembourg) DUWO Racing	Porsche 991 GT3 II Cup	909	(Russia) Sergey Peregudov	1, 4	
(Luxembourg) DUWO Racing	Porsche 991 GT3 II Cup	909	(Russia) Stanislav Sidoruk	1, 4	
(Luxembourg) DUWO Racing	Porsche 991 GT3 II Cup	909	(Luxembourg) Dylan Pereira	1	
(France) Porsche Lorient Racing	Porsche 991 GT3 II Cup	911	(France) Lionel Amrouche	1	
(France) Porsche Lorient Racing	Porsche 991 GT3 II Cup	911	(France) Frédéric Ancel	1	
(France) Porsche Lorient Racing	Porsche 991 GT3 II Cup	911	(United States) Dominique Bastien	1	
(France) Porsche Lorient Racing	Porsche 991 GT3 II Cup	911	(France) Jean-François Demorge	1	
(France) Porsche Lorient Racing	Porsche 991 GT3 II Cup	911	(France) Eric Mouez	1	
(Italy) Tempo .S.R.L.	Porsche 991 GT3 II Cup	916	(Italy) Davide di Benedetto	5	
(Italy) Tempo .S.R.L.	Porsche 991 GT3 II Cup	916	(Italy) Michele Merendino	5	
(Italy) Tempo .S.R.L.	Porsche 991 GT3 II Cup	916	(Italy) Giuseppe Nicolosi	5	
(Italy) Tempo .S.R.L.	Porsche 991 GT3 II Cup	916	(Italy) Simone Patrinicola	5	
(Italy) Fulgenzi Racing	Porsche 991 GT3 II Cup	917	(Japan) Shintaro Akatsu	5	
(Italy) Fulgenzi Racing	Porsche 991 GT3 II Cup	917	(Italy) Gianfranco Bronzini	5	
(Italy) Fulgenzi Racing	Porsche 991 GT3 II Cup	917	(Italy) Enrico Fulgenzi	5	
(Italy) Fulgenzi Racing	Porsche 991 GT3 II Cup	917	(Italy) Gianluca Spata	5	
(Italy) Fulgenzi Racing	Porsche 991 GT3 II Cup	917	(Netherlands) Sandra van der Sloot	5	
(Italy) Fulgenzi Racing	Porsche 991 GT3 II Cup	923	(Netherlands) Jeroen Bleekemolen	5	
(Italy) Fulgenzi Racing	Porsche 991 GT3 II Cup	923	(Argentina) Pablo Otero	5	
(Italy) Fulgenzi Racing	Porsche 991 GT3 II Cup	923	(Italy) Walter Palazzo	5	
(Italy) Fulgenzi Racing	Porsche 991 GT3 II Cup	923	(Italy) Giosué Rizzuto	5	
(Italy) Duell Race	Porsche 991 GT3 II Cup	918	(Italy) Gianluca Carboni	5	
(Italy) Duell Race	Porsche 991 GT3 II Cup	918	(United Kingdom) Steven Liquorish	5	
(Italy) Duell Race	Porsche 991 GT3 II Cup	918	(France) Eric Mouez	5	
(Belgium) Mühlner Motorsport	Porsche 991 GT3 II Cup	921	(Netherlands) Jeroen Bleekemolen	2	
(Belgium) Mühlner Motorsport	Porsche 991 GT3 II Cup	921	(Belgium) Tom Cloet	2	
(Belgium) Mühlner Motorsport	Porsche 991 GT3 II Cup	921	(Germany) Moritz Kranz	2	
(Belgium) Mühlner Motorsport	Porsche 991 GT3 II Cup	921	(Portugal) José Carlos Gomes Castro Vieira	2	
(Germany) HRT Motorsport	Porsche 991 GT3 II Cup	969	(Sweden) Erik Behrens	1	
(Germany) HRT Motorsport	Porsche 991 GT3 II Cup	969	(Sweden) Tommy Gråberg	1	
(Germany) HRT Motorsport	Porsche 991 GT3 II Cup	969	(Germany) Holger Harmsen	1	
(Germany) HRT Motorsport	Porsche 991 GT3 II Cup	969	(Sweden) Hans Holmlund	1	
(Germany) HRT Motorsport	Porsche 991 GT3 II Cup	969	(Germany) Leon Köhler	1	
(Belgium) Speed Lover	Porsche 991 GT3 II Cup	978	(United States) Dominique Bastien	2–4	
(Belgium) Speed Lover	Porsche 991 GT3 II Cup	978	(United Kingdom) Gavin Pickering	2–3	
(Belgium) Speed Lover	Porsche 991 GT3 II Cup	978	(France) Eric Mouez	2, 4, 6	
(Belgium) Speed Lover	Porsche 991 GT3 II Cup	978	(Belgium) Olivier Dons	2, 6	
(Belgium) Speed Lover	Porsche 991 GT3 II Cup	978	(Netherlands) Jeroen Kreeft	4	
(Belgium) Speed Lover	Porsche 991 GT3 II Cup	978	(Belgium) Rolf Lietart	4	
(Belgium) Speed Lover	Porsche 991 GT3 II Cup	978	(Belgium) Jürgen van Hover	6	
(Belgium) Speed Lover	Porsche 991 GT3 II Cup	979	(Netherlands) Kevin Veltman	1	
(Belgium) Speed Lover	Porsche 991 GT3 II Cup	979	(Netherlands) Marcel Schoonhoven	1	
(Belgium) Speed Lover	Porsche 991 GT3 II Cup	979	(Netherlands) Remon Leonard Vos	1	
(Belgium) Speed Lover	Porsche 991 GT3 II Cup	979	(Belgium) Olivier Dons	3	
(Belgium) Speed Lover	Porsche 991 GT3 II Cup	979	(Belgium) Rolf Lietart	3	
(Belgium) Speed Lover	Porsche 991 GT3 II Cup	979	(France) Eric Mouez	3	
(Germany) MRS GT-Racing	Porsche 991 GT3 II Cup	980	(Germany) Alex Autumn	1	
(Germany) MRS GT-Racing	Porsche 991 GT3 II Cup	980	(Germany) Andreas Gülden	1	
(Germany) MRS GT-Racing	Porsche 991 GT3 II Cup	980	(Germany) Wolfgang Triller	1	
(Germany) MRS GT-Racing	Porsche 991 GT3 II Cup	980	(Hong Kong) Shaun Thong	1	
(Germany) MRS GT-Racing	Porsche 991 GT3 II Cup	980	(Croatia) Franjo Kovac	1	
(Germany) MRS GT-Racing	Porsche 991 GT3 II Cup	989	(United Kingdom) Ollie Hancock	1	
(Germany) MRS GT-Racing	Porsche 991 GT3 II Cup	989	(United Kingdom) John Hartshorne	1	
(Germany) MRS GT-Racing	Porsche 991 GT3 II Cup	989	(Finland) Jukka Honkavuori	1	
(Germany) MRS GT-Racing	Porsche 991 GT3 II Cup	989	(Poland) Gosia Rdest	1	
(Netherlands) NKPP Racing by Bas Koeten Racing	Porsche 991 GT3 II Cup	991	(Netherlands) Gijs Bessem	4	
(Netherlands) NKPP Racing by Bas Koeten Racing	Porsche 991 GT3 II Cup	991	(Netherlands) Harry Hilders	4	
(Netherlands) NKPP Racing by Bas Koeten Racing	Porsche 991 GT3 II Cup	991	(Netherlands) Marcel van Berlo	4	
(Germany) race:pro motorsport	Porsche 991 GT3 II Cup	996	(Germany) Bertram Hornung	1	
(Germany) race:pro motorsport	Porsche 991 GT3 II Cup	996	(Germany) Matthias Jeserich	1	
(Germany) race:pro motorsport	Porsche 991 GT3 II Cup	996	(Netherlands) Larry ten Voorde	1	
(Germany) race:pro motorsport	Porsche 991 GT3 II Cup	996	(Germany) Christian Voigtländer	1	
(Germany) race:pro motorsport	Porsche 991 GT3 II Cup	996	(Netherlands) Max Weering	1	
(Germany) race:pro motorsport	Porsche 991 GT3 II Cup	997	(Luxembourg) Gabriele Rindone	1	
(Germany) race:pro motorsport	Porsche 991 GT3 II Cup	997	(Germany) Matthias Hoffsümmer	1	
(Germany) race:pro motorsport	Porsche 991 GT3 II Cup	997	(United Kingdom) Oliver Webb	1	
(Germany) race:pro motorsport	Porsche 991 GT3 II Cup	997	(United Arab Emirates) Nadir Zuhour	1	
(Germany) race:pro motorsport	Porsche 991 GT3 II Cup	997	(Germany) Mark Wallenwein	1	
GT4
Team	Car	No.	Drivers	Class	Rounds
(Germany) PROsport Performance AMR	Aston Martin Vantage AMR GT4	401	(Belgium) Rodrigue Gillion	GT4	2, 4–6
(Germany) PROsport Performance AMR	Aston Martin Vantage AMR GT4	401	(Belgium) Nico Verdonck	GT4	2, 4–6
(Germany) PROsport Performance AMR	Aston Martin Vantage AMR GT4	401	(Belgium) Tom Heeren	GT4	2, 4–5
(Germany) PROsport Performance AMR	Aston Martin Vantage AMR GT4	401	(Austria) Constantin Schöll	GT4	2
(Germany) PROsport Performance AMR	Aston Martin Vantage AMR GT4	401	(Germany) Carrie Schreiner	GT4	6
(Germany) Heide-Motorsport	Audi R8 LMS GT4 Evo	402	(Switzerland) Rahel Frey	GT4	1
(Germany) Heide-Motorsport	Audi R8 LMS GT4 Evo	402	(Germany) Heinz Schmersal	GT4	1
(Germany) Heide-Motorsport	Audi R8 LMS GT4 Evo	402	(United States) Alex Welch	GT4	1
(Germany) Heide-Motorsport	Audi R8 LMS GT4 Evo	402	(Germany) Mike Beckhusem	GT4	1
(South Korea) Atlas BX Motorsports	Mercedes-AMG GT4	403	(Canada) Steven Cho	GT4	1
(South Korea) Atlas BX Motorsports	Mercedes-AMG GT4	403	(South Korea) Jongkyum Kim	GT4	1
(South Korea) Atlas BX Motorsports	Mercedes-AMG GT4	403	(South Korea) Jaesung Park	GT4	1
(South Korea) Atlas BX Motorsports	Mercedes-AMG GT4	403	(Japan) Masataka Yanagida	GT4	1
(Portugal) Veloso Motorsport	Porsche Cayman GT4 Clubsport MR	408	(Portugal) José Costa	CAY	2
(Portugal) Veloso Motorsport	Porsche Cayman GT4 Clubsport MR	408	(Portugal) Pedro Marreiros	CAY	2
(Portugal) Veloso Motorsport	Porsche Cayman GT4 Clubsport MR	408	(France) Jean-Roch Piat	CAY	2
(Portugal) Veloso Motorsport	Porsche Cayman GT4 Clubsport MR	408	(Portugal) Paulo Pinheiro	CAY	2
(Portugal) Veloso Motorsport	Porsche Cayman GT4 Clubsport MR	408	(Portugal) Mariano Pires	CAY	2
(Netherlands) Las Moras by Equipe Verschuur	McLaren 570S GT4	409	(Netherlands) Liesette Braams	GT4	5
(Netherlands) Las Moras by Equipe Verschuur	McLaren 570S GT4	409	(Netherlands) Luc Braams	GT4	5
(Netherlands) Las Moras by Equipe Verschuur	McLaren 570S GT4	409	(Netherlands) Max Braams	GT4	5
(Germany) Leipert Motorsport	Mercedes-AMG GT4	410	(Germany) Kenneth Heyer	GT4	1
(Germany) Leipert Motorsport	Mercedes-AMG GT4	410	(Germany) Fidel Leib	GT4	1
(Germany) Leipert Motorsport	Mercedes-AMG GT4	410	(Germany) Ronny Lethmate	GT4	1
(Germany) Leipert Motorsport	Mercedes-AMG GT4	410	(Malaysia) Melvin Moh	GT4	1
(Portugal) Parkalgar Racing Team	Mercedes-AMG GT4	412	(Portugal) André Antunes	GT4	2
(Portugal) Parkalgar Racing Team	Mercedes-AMG GT4	412	(Netherlands) Fred Blok	GT4	2
(Portugal) Parkalgar Racing Team	Mercedes-AMG GT4	412	(Portugal) José Monroy	GT4	2
(Portugal) Parkalgar Racing Team	Mercedes-AMG GT4	412	(Brazil) Joaquim Penteado	GT4	2
(Portugal) Parkalgar Racing Team	Mercedes-AMG GT4	412	(Portugal) Alvaro Ramos	GT4	2
(Netherlands) MDM Motorsport	BMW M4 GT4	416	(Netherlands) Tim Coronel	GT4	3
(Netherlands) MDM Motorsport	BMW M4 GT4	416	(Netherlands) Tom Coronel	GT4	3
(Netherlands) MDM Motorsport	BMW M4 GT4	416	(Netherlands) Jan Jaap van Roon	GT4	3
(Belgium) Mühlner Motorsport	Porsche 718 Cayman GT4 Clubsport	421	(Luxembourg) Daniel Bohr	CAY	2
(Belgium) Mühlner Motorsport	Porsche 718 Cayman GT4 Clubsport	421	(Germany) Thorsten Jung	CAY	2
(Belgium) Mühlner Motorsport	Porsche 718 Cayman GT4 Clubsport	421	(Germany) Moritz Kranz	CAY	2
(Belgium) Mühlner Motorsport	Porsche 718 Cayman GT4 Clubsport	421	(Germany) Axel Sartingen	CAY	2
(Belgium) Mühlner Motorsport	Porsche 718 Cayman GT4 Clubsport	421	(Germany) Daniel Schwerfeld	CAY	2
(United Kingdom) Century Motorsport	BMW M4 GT4	429	(United Kingdom) Nathan Freke	GT4	1
(United Kingdom) Century Motorsport	BMW M4 GT4	429	(United Kingdom) Andrew Gordon-Colebrooke	GT4	1
(United Kingdom) Century Motorsport	BMW M4 GT4	429	(United States) Daren Jorgensen	GT4	1
(United Kingdom) Century Motorsport	BMW M4 GT4	429	(Canada) Ben Hurst	GT4	1
(United Kingdom) Century Motorsport	BMW M4 GT4	429	(United Kingdom) Angus Fender	GT4	1
(United Kingdom) Century Motorsport	BMW M4 GT4	430	(United Kingdom) Nathan Freke	GT4	1
(United Kingdom) Century Motorsport	BMW M4 GT4	430	(Canada) Ben Hurst	GT4	1
(United Kingdom) Century Motorsport	BMW M4 GT4	430	(United Kingdom) Angus Fender	GT4	1
(United Kingdom) Century Motorsport	BMW M4 GT4	430	(United States) Daren Jorgensen	GT4	1
(United Kingdom) Century Motorsport	BMW M4 GT4	430	(United States) Brett Strom	GT4	1
(Switzerland) Hofor Racing powered by Bonk Motorsport	BMW M4 GT4	431	(Germany) Hermann Bock	GT4	1
(Switzerland) Hofor Racing powered by Bonk Motorsport	BMW M4 GT4	431	(Switzerland) Martin Kroll	GT4	1
(Switzerland) Hofor Racing powered by Bonk Motorsport	BMW M4 GT4	431	(Switzerland) Michael Kroll	GT4	1
(Switzerland) Hofor Racing powered by Bonk Motorsport	BMW M4 GT4	431	(Germany) Max Partl	GT4	1
(Switzerland) Hofor Racing powered by Bonk Motorsport	BMW M4 GT4	431	(Germany) Alexander Prinz	GT4	1
(Switzerland) Hofor Racing powered by Bonk Motorsport	BMW M4 GT4	469	(Germany) Marc Ehret	GT4	1
(Switzerland) Hofor Racing powered by Bonk Motorsport	BMW M4 GT4	469	(Austria) Michael Fischer	GT4	1
(Switzerland) Hofor Racing powered by Bonk Motorsport	BMW M4 GT4	469	(Italy) Gabriele Piana	GT4	1
(Switzerland) Hofor Racing powered by Bonk Motorsport	BMW M4 GT4	469	(Germany) Michael Schrey	GT4	1
(Switzerland) Hofor Racing powered by Bonk Motorsport	BMW M4 GT4	469	(Germany) Tobias Müller	GT4	1
(Canada) ST Racing	BMW M4 GT4	438	(United States) John Boyd	GT4	1
(Canada) ST Racing	BMW M4 GT4	438	(United States) Jon Miller	GT4	1
(Canada) ST Racing	BMW M4 GT4	438	(Canada) Samantha Tan	GT4	1
(Canada) ST Racing	BMW M4 GT4	438	(Canada) Nickolas Wittmer	GT4	1
(Germany) Team Avia Sorg Rennsport	BMW M4 GT4	451	(Spain) José Manuel de los Milagros	GT4	1, 4–6
(Germany) Team Avia Sorg Rennsport	BMW M4 GT4	451	(Germany) Björn Simon	GT4	1, 4, 6
(Germany) Team Avia Sorg Rennsport	BMW M4 GT4	451	(Germany) Stephan Epp	GT4	1
(Germany) Team Avia Sorg Rennsport	BMW M4 GT4	451	(Netherlands) Paul Sieljes	GT4	1
(Germany) Team Avia Sorg Rennsport	BMW M4 GT4	451	(United Arab Emirates) Ahmed Al Melaihi	GT4	1
(Germany) Team Avia Sorg Rennsport	BMW M4 GT4	451	(Germany) Heiko Eichenberg	GT4	4
(Germany) Team Avia Sorg Rennsport	BMW M4 GT4	451	(Germany) Olaf Meyer	GT4	4
(Germany) Team Avia Sorg Rennsport	BMW M4 GT4	451	(Spain) Sergio Paulet	GT4	5–6
(Germany) Team Avia Sorg Rennsport	BMW M4 GT4	451	(Spain) Alvaro Fontes	GT4	5
(Germany) Team Avia Sorg Rennsport	BMW M4 GT4	451	(Spain) Yannick Guerra Dorribo	GT4	5
(Germany) Team Avia Sorg Rennsport	BMW M4 GT4	451	(Spain) Philippe Valenza	GT4	6
(United Kingdom) Ciceley Motorsport	Mercedes-AMG GT4	462	(United Kingdom) Adam Morgan	GT4	1
(United Kingdom) Ciceley Motorsport	Mercedes-AMG GT4	462	(United Kingdom) Jake Giddings	GT4	1
(United Kingdom) Ciceley Motorsport	Mercedes-AMG GT4	462	(Slovakia) Katarina Kyvalova	GT4	1
(United Kingdom) Ciceley Motorsport	Mercedes-AMG GT4	462	(United Kingdom) Jon Minshaw	GT4	1
(United Kingdom) Ciceley Motorsport	Mercedes-AMG GT4	462	(United Kingdom) Jack Butel	GT4	1
(France) 3Y Technology	BMW M4 GT4	468	(France) Gilles Vannelet	GT4	1
(France) 3Y Technology	BMW M4 GT4	468	(Switzerland) Nidal Baumgartner	GT4	1
(France) 3Y Technology	BMW M4 GT4	468	(Czech Republic) Petr Lisa	GT4	1
(France) 3Y Technology	BMW M4 GT4	468	(Netherlands) Beitske Visser	GT4	1
(United Kingdom) Newbridge Motorsport AMR	Aston Martin Vantage AMR GT4	471	(United Kingdom) Ricky Coomber	GT4	1
(United Kingdom) Newbridge Motorsport AMR	Aston Martin Vantage AMR GT4	471	(Belgium) Rodrigue Gillion	GT4	1
(United Kingdom) Newbridge Motorsport AMR	Aston Martin Vantage AMR GT4	471	(South Africa) Paul Hill	GT4	1
(United Kingdom) Newbridge Motorsport AMR	Aston Martin Vantage AMR GT4	471	(South Africa) Michael Stephen	GT4	1
(United Kingdom) Newbridge Motorsport AMR	Aston Martin Vantage AMR GT4	471	(Belgium) Nico Verdonck	GT4	1
(Italy) Ebimotors	Porsche 718 Cayman GT4 Clubsport	473	(Italy) Alessandro Cutrera	GT4	6
(Italy) Ebimotors	Porsche 718 Cayman GT4 Clubsport	473	(Italy) Leonardo-Maria del Vecchio	GT4	6
(Italy) Ebimotors	Porsche 718 Cayman GT4 Clubsport	473	(Italy) Marco Frezza	GT4	6
(Italy) Ebimotors	Porsche 718 Cayman GT4 Clubsport	473	(Italy) Marco Talarico	GT4	6

Icon	Class
P	GT3-Pro
Am	GT3-Am
GT4	GT4
CAY	Cayman

== Race results ==
Bold indicates overall winner.

Classes	(United Arab Emirates) 24H Dubai Round 1	(Portugal) 24H Portimão Round 2	(Italy) 12H Monza Round 3	(Germany) 16H Hockenheimring Round 4	(Italy) 12H Pergusa Round 5	(Italy) 12H Mugello Round 6
GT3-Pro Winners	**(Germany) No. 4 Black Falcon**			Merged with GT3-Am	**(United Arab Emirates) No. 36 GPX Racing**	**(Germany) No. 91 Herberth Motorsport**
GT3-Pro Winners	**(United Arab Emirates) Khaled Al Qubaisi** **(United Kingdom) Ben Barker** **(Netherlands) Jeroen Bleekemolen** **(Germany) Hubert Haupt** **(Germany) Manuel Metzger**	Merged with GT3-Am	Merged with GT3-Am	Merged with GT3-Am	**(United Arab Emirates) Frédéric Fatien** **(South Africa) Jordan Grogor** **(France) Mathieu Jaminet**	**(Germany) Ralf Bohn** **(Germany) Robert Renauer** **(Switzerland) Daniel Allemann**
GT3-Am Winners	(Netherlands) No. 19 MP Motorsport	**(Germany) No. 92 Herberth Motorsport**	**(Germany) No. 92 Herberth Motorsport**	(United States) No. 85 CP Racing		
GT3-Am Winners	(Netherlands) Bert de Heus (Netherlands) Daniël de Jong (Netherlands) Henk de Jong (Netherlands) Jaap van Lagen	**(Germany) Jürgen Häring** **(Germany) Michael Joos** **(Greece) Taki Konstantinou** **(Germany) Tim Müller** **(Germany) Marco Seefried**	**(Germany) Jürgen Häring** **(Greece) Taki Konstantinou** **(Germany) Alfred Renauer**	(United States) Charles Espenlaub (United States) Joe Foster (United States) Shane Lewis (United States) Charles Putman	Merged with GT3-Pro	Merged with GT3-Pro
GTX Winners	(United Arab Emirates) No. 788 Dragon Racing	No entrants	(Slovakia) No. 707 ARC Bratislava	No Finishers	No entrants	No entrants
GTX Winners	(United Kingdom) Adam Balon (United Kingdom) Glynn Geddie (United Kingdom) James Geddie (United Kingdom) Phil Keen	No entrants	(Slovakia) Maťo Homola (Slovakia) Miro Konôpka (Slovakia) Mat'o Konopka	No Finishers	No entrants	No entrants
991 Winners	(Germany) No. 989 MRS GT-Racing	(Belgium) No. 921 Mühlner Motorsport	(Belgium) No. 978 Speed Lover	**(Netherlands) No. 991 NKPP Racing by Bas Koeten Racing**	(Italy) No. 907 Dinamic Motorsport	(Belgium) No. 978 Speed Lover
991 Winners	(United Kingdom) Ollie Hancock (United Kingdom) John Hartshorne (Finland) Jukka Honkavuori (Poland) Gosia Rdest	(Netherlands) Jeroen Bleekemolen (Belgium) Tom Cloet (Germany) Moritz Kranz (Portugal) José Carlos Gomes Castro Vieira	(United States) Dominique Bastien (United Kingdom) Gavin Pickering	**(Netherlands) Gijs Bessem** **(Netherlands) Harry Hilders** **(Netherlands) Marcel van Berlo**	(Italy) Simone Iaquinta (Italy) Matteo Malucelli (Switzerland) Stefano Monaco (Italy) Roberto Pampanini	(Belgium) Olivier Dons (France) Eric Mouez (Belgium) Jürgen van Hover
GT4 Winners	(South Korea) No. 403 Atlas BX Motorsports	(Germany) No. 401 PROsport Performance AMR	(Netherlands) No. 450 MDM Motorsport	(Germany) No. 451 Team Avia Sorg Rennsport	(Germany) No. 401 PROsport Performance AMR	(Germany) No. 451 Team Avia Sorg Rennsport
GT4 Winners	(Canada) Steven Cho (South Korea) Jongkyum Kim (South Korea) Jaesung Park (Japan) Masataka Yanagida	(Belgium) Rodrigue Gillion (Belgium) Tom Heeren (Austria) Constantin Schöll (Belgium) Nico Verdonck	(Netherlands) Tim Coronel (Netherlands) Tom Coronel (Netherlands) Jan Jaap van Roon	(Germany) Björn Simon (Spain) José Manuel de los Milagros (Germany) Heiko Eichenberg (Germany) Olaf Meyer	(Belgium) Rodrigue Gillion (Belgium) Tom Heeren (Belgium) Nico Verdonck	(Germany) Björn Simon (Spain) José Manuel de los Milagros (Spain) Sergio Paulet (Spain) Philippe Valenza
Cayman Winners	Did not participate	(Belgium) No. 421 Mühlner Motorsport	Did not participate	Did not participate	Did not participate	No entrants
Cayman Winners	Did not participate	(Luxembourg) Daniel Bohr (Germany) Moritz Kranz (Germany) Thorsten Jung (Germany) Axel Sartingen (Germany) Daniel Schwerfeld	Did not participate	Did not participate	Did not participate	No entrants
PX Winners	No entrants	No entrants	No entrants	No entrants	(Italy) No. 45 Avelon Formula	No entrants
PX Winners	No entrants	No entrants	No entrants	No entrants	(Italy) Ivan Bellarosa (Italy) Guglielmo Belotti	No entrants

=== Championship standings ===
==== Drivers' Overall Continents Series ====
Pos.	Drivers	Team	Class	(United Arab Emirates) DUB	(Portugal) POR	(Germany) HOC	(Italy) MUG	Pts.
1	(Netherlands) Jeroen Bleekemolen	(Germany) No. 4 Black Falcon	GT3-Pro	**1**				58
1	(Netherlands) Jeroen Bleekemolen	(Belgium) No. 921 Mühlner Motorsport	991		**3**			58
2	(Germany) Ralf Bohn (Germany) Robert Renauer (Germany) Alfred Renauer	(Germany) No. 91 Herberth Motorsport	GT3-Pro	4	2			46
3	(United States) Dominique Bastien (France) Eric Mouez	(France) No. 991 Porsche Lorient Racing	991	25				45
3	(United States) Dominique Bastien (France) Eric Mouez	(Belgium) No. 978 Speedlover	991		9	12		45
4	(Germany) Jürgen Häring (Germany) Tim Müller	(Australia) No. 95 Earl Bamber Motorsport	GT3-AM	14				43
4	(Germany) Jürgen Häring (Germany) Tim Müller	(Germany) No. 92 Herberth Motorsport	GT3-AM		1			43
4	(Belgium) Rodrigue Gillion (Belgium) Nico Verdonck	(United Kingdom) No. 471 Newbridge Motorsport	GT4	DNS				43
4	(Belgium) Rodrigue Gillion (Belgium) Nico Verdonck	(Germany) No. 401 PROsport Performance AMR	GT4		**13**	10		43
4	(Belgium) Tom Heeren	(Germany) No. 401 PROsport Performance AMR	GT4		**13**	10		43
5	(Spain) Jose Manuel de los Milagros (Germany) Björn Simon	(Germany) No. 451 Team Avia Sorg Rennsport	GT4	34		6		42
6	(Russia) Andrey Mukovoz (Russia) Sergey Peregudov (Russia) Stanislav Sidoruk	(Luxembourg) No. 909 DUWO Racing	991	21		2		39
7	(United Arab Emirates) Khaled Al Qubaisi (United Kingdom) Ben Barker (Germany) Hubert Haupt (Germany) Manuel Metzger	(Germany) No. 4 Black Falcon	GT3-Pro	**1**				30
7	(Canada) Steven Cho (South Korea) Jong-Kyum Kim (South Korea) Jae-Sung Park (Japan) Masataka Yanagida	(South Korea) No. 403 Atlas BX Motorsports	GT4	**30**				30
8	(Netherlands) Bert de Heus (Netherlands) Daniël de Jong (Netherlands) Henk de Jong (Netherlands) Jaap van Lagen	(Netherlands) No. 19 MP Motorsport	GT3-AM	8				29
8	(United Kingdom) Adam Balon (United Kingdom) Glynn Geddie (United Kingdom) James Geddie (United Kingdom) Phil Keen	(United Arab Emirates) No. 788 Dragon Racing	GTX	17				29
8	(United Kingdom) Ollie Hancock (United Kingdom) John Hartshorne (Finland) Jukka Honkavuori (Poland) Gosia Rdest	(Germany) No. 989 MRS GT-Racing	991	18				29
9	(Germany) Michael Joos (Greece) Taki Konstantinou (Germany) Marco Seefried	(Germany) No. 92 Herberth Motorsport	GT3-AM		1			28
9	(Austria) Constantin Schöll	(Germany) No. 401 PROsport Performance AMR	GT4		**13**			28
9	(Luxembourg) Daniel Bohr (Germany) Thorsten Jung (Germany) Axel Sartingen (Germany) Daniel Schwerfeld	(Belgium) No. 421 Mühlner Motorsport	Cayman		**7**			28
9	(Belgium) Tom Cloet (Germany) Moritz Kranz (Portugal) José Carlos Gomes Castro Vieira	(Belgium) No. 921 Mühlner Motorsport	991		**3**			28
9	(Netherlands) Rik Breukers (Germany) Christopher Haase (Germany) Mike David Ortmann (Germany) Dimitri Parhofer (Germany) Markus Winkelhock	(Germany) No. 88 Car Collection Motorsport	GT3-Pro	2				28
9	(United Kingdom) Angus Fender (United Kingdom) Nathan Freke (Canada) Ben Hurst (United States) Daren Jorgensen (United States) Brett Strom	(United Kingdom) No. 430 Century Motorsport	GT4	32				28
10	(Netherlands) Rik Breukers (Saudi Arabia) Mohammed Saud Fahad Al Saud (Netherlands) Michael Vergers (Belgium) Dries Vanthoor (Germany) Christopher Mies	(Saudi Arabia) No. 7 MS7 by WRT	GT3-Pro	3				26
10	(Austria) Alexander Hrachowina (United Kingdom) Finlay Hutchison (Zimbabwe) Axcil Jefferies (Austria) Martin Konrad (United States) George Kurtz	(Germany) No. 70 Toksport WRT	GT3-AM	10				26
10	(United Kingdom) Angus Fender (United Kingdom) Nathan Freke (United Kingdom) Andrew Gordon-Colebrooke (Canada) Ben Hurst (United States) Daren Jorgensen	(United Kingdom) No. 429 Century Motorsport	GT4	33				26
10	(Belgium) Olivier Bertels (Belgium) Jimmy de Breuker (Belgium) Johnny de Breuker (Russia) Dmitry Gvazava (Belgium) Michiel Verhaeren	(Belgium) No. 754 QSR Racing	GTX	28				26
10	(Germany) Bertram Hornung (Germany) Matthias Jeserich (Germany) Christian Voigtländer (Netherlands) Larry Ten Voorde (Netherlands) Max Weering	(Germany) No. 996 race:pro motorsport	991	20				26
Pos.	Drivers	Team	Class	(United Arab Emirates) DUB	(Portugal) POR	(Germany) HOC	(Italy) MUG	Pts.

Colour	Result
Gold	Winner
Silver	Second place
Bronze	Third place
Green	Points classification
Blue	Non-points classification
Blue	Non-classified finish (NC)
Purple	Retired, not classified (Ret)
Red	Did not qualify (DNQ)
Red	Did not pre-qualify (DNPQ)
Black	Disqualified (DSQ)
White	Did not start (DNS)
White	Withdrew (WD)
White	Race cancelled (C)
Blank	Did not practice (DNP)
Blank	Did not arrive (DNA)
Blank	Excluded (EX)

**Bold** – Pole
Italics – Fastest Lap

==== Teams' Overall Continents Series ====
Pos.	Team	Class	(United Arab Emirates) DUB	(Portugal) POR	(Germany) HOC	(Italy) MUG	Pts.
1	(Germany) No. 91 Herberth Motorsport	GT3-Pro	4	2			46
2	(Germany) No. 401 PROSport Performance AMR	GT4		**13**	10		43
3	(Germany) No. 451 Team Avia Sorg Rennsport	GT4	34		6		42
4	(Luxembourg) No. 909 DUWO Racing	991	21		2		39
5	(Belgium) No. 978 Speed Lover	991		9	12		33
6	(Germany) No. 4 Black Falcon	GT3-Pro	**1**				30
6	(United States) No. 85 CP Racing	GT3-AM	15		7		30
6	(South Korea) No. 403 Atlas BX Motorsports	GT4	**30**				30
7	(Netherlands) No. 19 MP Motorsport	GT3-AM	8				29
7	(United Arab Emirates) No. 788 Dragon Racing	GTX	17				29
7	(Germany) No. 989 MRS GT-Racing	991	18				29
8	(Germany) No. 88 Car Collection Motorsport	GT3-Pro	2				28
8	(Germany) No. 92 Herberth Motorsport	GT3-AM		1			28
8	(Belgium) No. 421 Mühlner Motorsport	Cayman		**7**			28
8	(United Kingdom) No. 430 Century Motorsport	GT4	32				28
8	(Belgium) No. 921 Mühlner Motorsport	991		**3**			28
9	(Saudi Arabia) No. 7 MS7 by WRT	GT3-Pro	3				26
9	(Germany) No. 70 Toksport WRT	GT3-AM	10				26
9	(United Kingdom) No. 429 Century Motorsport	GT4	33				26
9	(Belgium) No. 754 QSR Racing	GTX	28				26
9	(Germany) No. 996 race:pro motorsport	991	20				26
10	(Italy) No. 28 Dinamic Motorsport	GT3-AM	11				24
10	(Belgium) No. 758 VDS Racing Adventures	GTX	48				24
Pos.	Team	Class	(United Arab Emirates) DUB	(Portugal) POR	(Germany) HOC	(Italy) MUG	Pts.

Colour	Result
Gold	Winner
Silver	Second place
Bronze	Third place
Green	Points classification
Blue	Non-points classification
Blue	Non-classified finish (NC)
Purple	Retired, not classified (Ret)
Red	Did not qualify (DNQ)
Red	Did not pre-qualify (DNPQ)
Black	Disqualified (DSQ)
White	Did not start (DNS)
White	Withdrew (WD)
White	Race cancelled (C)
Blank	Did not practice (DNP)
Blank	Did not arrive (DNA)
Blank	Excluded (EX)

**Bold** – Pole
Italics – Fastest Lap

==== GT3-Pro Drivers' Continents Series ====
Pos.	Drivers	Team	(United Arab Emirates) DUB	(Portugal) POR	(Germany) HOC	(Italy) MUG	Pts.
1	(Germany) Ralf Bohn (Germany) Robert Renauer (Germany) Alfred Renauer	(Germany) No. 91 Herberth Motorsport	4	2			46
2	(United Arab Emirates) Khaled Al Qubaisi (United Kingdom) Ben Barker (Netherlands) Jeroen Bleekemolen (Germany) Hubert Haupt (Germany) Manuel Metzger	(Germany) No. 4 Black Falcon	**1**				30
3	(Netherlands) Rik Breukers (Germany) Christopher Haase (Germany) Mike David Ortmann (Germany) Dimitri Parhofer (Germany) Markus Winkelhock	(Germany) No. 88 Car Collection Motorsport	2				28
4	(Netherlands) Rik Breukers (Saudi Arabia) Mohammed Saud Fahad Al Saud (Netherlands) Michael Vergers (Belgium) Dries Vanthoor (Germany) Christopher Mies	(Saudi Arabia) No. 7 MS7 by WRT	3				26
5	(Germany) Sven Müller	(Germany) No. 91 Herberth Motorsport	4				24
6	(Switzerland) Rolf Ineichen (Switzerland) Mark Ineichen (Italy) Mirko Bortolotti (South Africa) Kelvin van der Linde (Netherlands) Michael Vergers	(Belgium) No. 31 Team WRT	5				22
6	(Switzerland) Daniel Allemann	(Germany) No. 91 Herberth Motorsport		2			22
7	(Switzerland) Adrian Amstutz (United Kingdom) Adam Balon (Finland) Patrick Kujala (Denmark) Dennis Lind (United Kingdom) Jordan Witt	(United Kingdom) No. 97 Barwell Motorsport	6				20
8	(Austria) Dominik Baumann (Germany) Lance David Arnold (United Kingdom) Tom Onslow-Cole (Germany) Valentin Pierburg	(Germany) No. 10 SPS automotive performance	7				18
9	(Netherlands) Luc Braams (Italy) Mattia Drudi (Netherlands) Duncan Huisman (Austria) Nicolas Schöll	(Germany) No. 99 Attempto Racing	9				16
10	(Oman) Al Faisal Al Zubair (Germany) Maximilian Buhk (Germany) Christopher Brück (Netherlands) Indy Dontje (Germany) Maximilian Götz	(Germany) No. 84 HTP Winward Motorsport	16				14
Pos.	Drivers	Team	(United Arab Emirates) DUB	(Portugal) POR	(Germany) HOC	(Italy) MUG	Pts.

==== GT3-Pro Teams' Continents Series ====
Pos.	Team	(United Arab Emirates) DUB	(Portugal) POR	(Germany) HOC	(Italy) MUG	Pts.
1	(Germany) No. 91 Herberth Motorsport	4	2			46
2	(Germany) No. 4 Black Falcon	**1**				30
3	(Germany) No. 88 Car Collection Motorsport	2				28
4	(Saudi Arabia) No. 7 MS7 by WRT	3				26
5	(Belgium) No. 31 Team WRT	5				22
6	(United Kingdom) No. 97 Barwell Motorsport	6				20
7	(Germany) No. 10 SPS automotive performance	7				18
8	(Germany) No. 99 Attempto Racing	9				16
9	(Germany) No. 84 HTP Winward Motorsport	16				14
10	(Germany) No. 777 Toksport WRT	19				12
Pos.	Team	(United Arab Emirates) DUB	(Portugal) POR	(Germany) HOC	(Italy) MUG	Pts.

==== GT3-AM Drivers' Continents Series ====
Pos.	Drivers	Team	(United Arab Emirates) DUB	(Portugal) POR	(Germany) HOC	(Italy) MUG	Pts.
1	(Germany) Jürgen Häring (Germany) Tim Müller	(Australia) No. 95 Earl Bamber Motorsport	14				43
1	(Germany) Jürgen Häring (Germany) Tim Müller	(Germany) No. 92 Herberth Motorsport		1			43
2	(United States) Charles Espenlaub (United States) Shane Lewis (United States) Charles Putman	(United States) No. 85 CP Racing	15		7		30
3	(Netherlands) Bert de Heus (Netherlands) Daniël de Jong (Netherlands) Henk de Jong (Netherlands) Jaap van Lagen	(Netherlands) No. 19 MP Motorsport	8				29
4	(Germany) Michael Joos (Greece) Taki Konstantinou (Germany) Marco Seefried	(Germany) No. 92 Herberth Motorsport		1			28
5	(Austria) Alexander Hrachowina (United Kingdom) Finlay Hutchison (Zimbabwe) Axcil Jefferies (Austria) Martin Konrad (United States) George Kurtz	(Germany) No. 70 Toksport WRT	10				26
6	(Denmark) Mikkel O. Pedersen (Italy) Roberto Pampanini (Switzerland) Ivan Jacoma (Switzerland) Mauro Calamia (Switzerland) Stefano Monaco	(Italy) No. 28 Dinamic Motorsport	11				24
7	(Germany) Johannes Kirchhoff (Germany) Gustav Edelhoff (Germany) Elmar Grimm (Germany) Ingo Vogler	(Germany) No. 34 Car Collection Motorsport	12				21
8	(United States) Joe Foster	(United States) No. 85 CP Racing			7		18
8	(Hong Kong) Antares Au (Hong Kong) Jonathan Hui (Macau) Kevin Tse (Hong Kong) Frank Yu	No. 69 Team Hong Kong Craft-Bamboo Racing	13				18
9	(New Zealand) Will Bamber (Germany) Jürgen Häring (Germany) Tim Müller (Spain) Gérard López (Luxembourg) Eric Lux	(Australia) No. 95 Earl Bamber Motorsport	14				16
10	(United States) Mike Hedlund	(United States) No. 85 CP Racing	15				12
Pos.	Drivers	Team	(United Arab Emirates) DUB	(Portugal) POR	(Germany) HOC	(Italy) MUG	Pts.

==== GT3-AM Drivers' Continents Series ====
Pos.	Team	(United Arab Emirates) DUB	(Portugal) POR	(Germany) HOC	(Italy) MUG	Pts.
1	(United States) No. 85 CP Racing	15		7		30
2	(Netherlands) No. 19 MP Motorsport	8				29
3	(Germany) No. 92 Herberth Motorsport		1			28
4	(Germany) No. 70 Toksport WRT	10				26
5	(Italy) No. 28 Dinamic Motorsport	11				24
6	(Germany) No. 34 Car Collection Motorsport	12				21
7	No. 69 Team Hong Kong Craft-Bamboo Racing	13				18
8	(Australia) No. 95 Earl Bamber Motorsport	14				16
9	(Italy) No. 29 Dinamic Motorsport	29				9
10	(France) No. 26 Saintéloc Racing	Ret				6
Pos.	Team	(United Arab Emirates) DUB	(Portugal) POR	(Germany) HOC	(Italy) MUG	Pts.

==== GTX Drivers' Continents Series ====
Pos.	Drivers	Team	(United Arab Emirates) DUB	(Portugal) POR	(Germany) HOC	(Italy) MUG	Pts.
1	(United Kingdom) Adam Balon (United Kingdom) Glynn Geddie (United Kingdom) James Geddie (United Kingdom) Phil Keen	(United Arab Emirates) No. 788 Dragon Racing	17				29
2	(Belgium) Olivier Bertels (Belgium) Jimmy de Breuker (Belgium) Johnny de Breuker (Russia) Dmitry Gvazava (Belgium) Michiel Verhaeren	(Belgium) No. 754 QSR Racing	28				26
3	(Belgium) Raphaël van der Straten (Luxembourg) Hary Putz (Belgium) Nick Geelen (Belgium) Patrick Asnong (Australia) Jake Camilleri	(Belgium) No. 758 VDS Racing Adventures	48				24
4	(Netherlands) Cor Euser (Hong Kong) Nigel Farmer (Malaysia) Keong Liam Lim (Norway) Einar Thorsen (Netherlands) Richard Verburg	(Netherlands) No. 717 Cor Euser Racing	49				21
5	(France) Tom Dillmann (United States) Gregg Gorski (United Kingdom) J.M. Littman (Luxembourg) Yury Wagner (United States) Gerhard Watzinger	(Germany) No. 710 Leipert Motorsport	54				18
6	(Italy) Stefano D'Aste (Italy) Enrico Ricciardi (Italy) Luciano Tarabini (Monaco) Vito Utzieri	(Italy) No. 705 Lotus PB Racing	61				15
7	(France) Julien Boillot (France) Philippe Bonnel (France) Arnaud Gomez (France) Olivier Gomez	(France) No. 201 Vortex V8	Ret				0
7	(United States) Dominique Bastien (Thailand) Vutthikorn Inthraphuvasak (Germany) Christian Ried	(Germany) No. 711 Proton Competition			DNS		0
Pos.	Drivers	Team	(United Arab Emirates) DUB	(Portugal) POR	(Germany) HOC	(Italy) MUG	Pts.

==== GTX Teams' Continents Series ====
Pos.	Team	(United Arab Emirates) DUB	(Portugal) POR	(Germany) HOC	(Italy) MUG	Pts.
1	(United Arab Emirates) No. 788 Dragon Racing	17				29
2	(Belgium) No. 754 QSR Racing	28				26
3	(Belgium) No. 758 VDS Racing Adventures	48				24
4	(Netherlands) No. 717 Cor Euser Racing	49				21
5	(Germany) No. 710 Leipert Motorsport	54				18
6	(Italy) No. 705 Lotus PB Racing	61				15
7	(France) No. 201 Vortex V8	Ret				0
7	(Germany) No. 711 Proton Competition			DNS		0
Pos.	Team	(United Arab Emirates) DUB	(Portugal) POR	(Germany) HOC	(Italy) MUG	Pts.

==== 991 Drivers' Continents Series ====
Pos.	Drivers	Team	(United Arab Emirates) DUB	(Portugal) POR	(Germany) HOC	(Italy) MUG	Pts.
1	(United States) Dominique Bastien (France) Eric Mouez	(France) No. 991 Porsche Lorient Racing	25				45
1	(United States) Dominique Bastien (France) Eric Mouez	(Belgium) No. 978 Speedlover		9	12		45
2	(Russia) Andrey Mukovoz (Russia) Sergey Peregudov (Russia) Stanislav Sidoruk	(Luxembourg) No. 909 DUWO Racing	21		2		39
3	(United Kingdom) Ollie Hancock (United Kingdom) John Hartshorne (Finland) Jukka Honkavuori (Poland) Gosia Rdest	(Germany) No. 989 MRS GT-Racing	18				29
4	(Netherlands) Jeroen Bleekemolen (Belgium) Tom Cloet (Germany) Moritz Kranz (Portugal) José Carlos Gomes Castro Vieira	(Belgium) No. 921 Mühlner Motorsport		3			28
5	(Germany) Bertram Hornung (Germany) Matthias Jeserich (Germany) Christian Voigtländer (Netherlands) Larry Ten Voorde (Netherlands) Max Weering	(Germany) No. 996 race:pro motorsport	20				26
6	(Luxembourg) Dylan Pereira	(Luxembourg) No. 909 DUWO Racing	21				24
7	(Belgium) Olivier Dons (United Kingdom) Gavin Pickering	(Belgium) No. 978 Speedlover		9			22
8	(Sweden) Hans Holmlund (Sweden) Tommy Gråberg (Sweden) Erik Behrens (Germany) Holger Harmsen (Germany) Leon Köhler	(Germany) No. 969 HRT Motorsport	22				21
9	(Netherlands) Gijs Bessem (Netherlands) Harry Hilders (Netherlands) Marcel van Berlo	(Netherlands) No. 991 NKPP Racing by Bas Koeten Racing			1		18
9	(Germany) Matthias Hoffsümmer (Luxembourg) Gabriele Rindone (United Kingdom) Oliver Webb (Germany) Mark Wallenwein (United Arab Emirates) Nadir Zuhour	(Germany) No. 997 race:pro motorsport	23				18
10	(Germany) Alex Autumn (Germany) Andreas Gülden (Croatia) Franjo Kovac (Hong Kong) Shaun Thong (Germany) Wolfgang Triller	(Germany) No. 980 MRS GT-Racing	24				15
Pos.	Drivers	Team	(United Arab Emirates) DUB	(Portugal) POR	(Germany) HOC	(Italy) MUG	Pts.

==== 991 Teams' Continents Series ====
Pos.	Team	(United Arab Emirates) DUB	(Portugal) POR	(Germany) HOC	(Italy) MUG	Pts.
1	(Luxembourg) No. 909 DUWO Racing	21		2		39
2	(Belgium) No. 978 Speedlover		9	12		33
3	(Germany) No. 989 MRS GT-Racing	18				29
4	(Belgium) No. 921 Mühlner Motorsport		3			28
5	(Germany) No. 996 race:pro motorsport	20				26
6	(Germany) No. 969 HRT Motorsport	22				21
7	(Netherlands) No. 991 NKPP Racing by Bas Koeten Racing			1		18
7	(Germany) No. 997 race:pro motorsport	23				18
8	(Germany) No. 980 MRS GT-Racing	24				15
9	(France) No. 911 Porsche Lorient Racing	25				12
10	(New Zealand) No. 904 JFC / LB Living Racing	27				9
Pos.	Team	(United Arab Emirates) DUB	(Portugal) POR	(Germany) HOC	(Italy) MUG	Pts.

==== GT4 Drivers' Continents Series ====
Pos.	Drivers	Team	(United Arab Emirates) DUB	(Portugal) POR	(Germany) HOC	(Italy) MUG	Pts.
1	(Belgium) Rodrigue Gillion (Belgium) Nico Verdonck	(United Kingdom) No. 471 Newbridge Motorsport	DNS				43
1	(Belgium) Rodrigue Gillion (Belgium) Nico Verdonck	(Germany) No. 401 PROsport Performance AMR		**13**	10		43
1	(Belgium) Tom Heeren	(Germany) No. 401 PROsport Performance AMR		**13**	10		43
2	(Spain) Jose Manuel de los Milagros (Germany) Björn Simon	(Germany) No. 451 Team Avia Sorg Rennsport	34		6		42
3	(Canada) Steven Cho (South Korea) Jong-Kyum Kim (South Korea) Jae-Sung Park (Japan) Masataka Yanagida	(South Korea) No. 403 Atlas BX Motorsports	**30**				30
4	(United Kingdom) Angus Fender (Canada) Ben Hurst (United States) Daren Jorgensen (United States) Brett Strom	(United Kingdom) No. 430 Century Motorsport	32				28
5	(United Kingdom) Nathan Freke (United Kingdom) Andrew Gordon-Colebrooke (Canada) Ben Hurst (United States) Daren Jorgensen	(United Kingdom) No. 429 Century Motorsport	33				26
6	(Germany) Stephan Epp (Germany) Björn Simon (Netherlands) Paul Seiljes (Spain) Jose Manuel de los Milagros (United Arab Emirates) Ahmed Al Melaihi	(Germany) No. 451 Team Avia Sorg Rennsport	34				24
7	(Germany) Fidel Lieb (Germany) Ronny Lethmate (Germany) Kenneth Heyer (Malaysia) Melvin Moh	(Germany) No. 410 Leipert Motorsport	36				22
8	(United Kingdom) Jack Butel (Slovakia) Katarina Kyvalova (United Kingdom) Jake Giddings (United Kingdom) Jon Minshaw (United Kingdom) Adam Morgan	(United Kingdom) No. 462 Ciceley Motorsport	37				20
9	(United States) John Boyd (United States) Jon Miller (Canada) Samantha Tan (Canada) Nickolas Wittmer	(Canada) No. 438 ST Racing	38				18
10	(Germany) Mike Beckhusen (Switzerland) Rahel Frey (Germany) Heinz Schmersal (United States) Alex Welch	(Germany) No. 402 Heide-Motorsport	41				16
9	(Germany) Marc Ehret (Austria) Michael Fischer (Germany) Tobias Müller (Italy) Gabriele Piana (Germany) Michael Schrey	(Switzerland) No. 469 Hofor Racing by Bonk Motorsport	42				14
10	(Germany) Hermann Bock (Switzerland) Martin Kroll (Switzerland) Michael Kroll (Germany) Max Partl (Switzerland) Alexander Prinz	(Switzerland) No. 431 Hofor Racing by Bonk Motorsport	47				12
Pos.	Drivers	Team	(United Arab Emirates) DUB	(Portugal) POR	(Germany) HOC	(Italy) MUG	Pts.

==== GT4 Teams' Continents Series ====
Pos.	Team	(United Arab Emirates) DUB	(Portugal) POR	(Germany) HOC	(Italy) MUG	Pts.
1	(Germany) No. 401 PROsport Performance AMR		**13**	10		43
2	(Germany) No. 451 Team Avia Sorg Rennsport	34		6		42
3	(South Korea) No. 403 Atlas BX Motorsports	**30**				30
4	(United Kingdom) No. 430 Century Motorsport	32				28
5	(United Kingdom) No. 429 Century Motorsport	33				26
6	(Germany) No. 410 Leipert Motorsport	36				22
6	(Portugal) No. 412 Parkalgar Racing Team		14			22
7	(United Kingdom) No. 462 Ciceley Motorsport	37				20
8	(Canada) No. 438 ST Racing	38				18
9	(Germany) No. 402 Heide-Motorsport	41				16
10	(Switzerland) No. 469 Hofor Racing by Bonk Motorsport	42				14
Pos.	Team	(United Arab Emirates) DUB	(Portugal) POR	(Germany) HOC	(Italy) MUG	Pts.

==== Cayman Drivers' Continents Series ====
Pos.	Drivers	Team	(United Arab Emirates) DUB	(Portugal) POR	(Germany) HOC	(Italy) MUG	Pts.
1	(Luxembourg) Daniel Bohr (Germany) Thorsten Jung (Germany) Axel Sartingen (Germany) Daniel Schwerfeld	(Belgium) No. 421 Mühlner Motorsport		7			28
2	(Portugal) José Costa (Portugal) Pedro Marreiros (France) Jean-Roch Piat (Portugal) Paulo Pinheiro (Portugal) Mariano Pires	(Portugal) No. 408 Veloso Motorsport		11			22
Pos.	Drivers	Team	(United Arab Emirates) DUB	(Portugal) POR	(Germany) HOC	(Italy) MUG	Pts.

==== Cayman Teams' Continents Series ====
Pos.	Team	(United Arab Emirates) DUB	(Portugal) POR	(Germany) HOC	(Italy) MUG	Pts.
1	(Belgium) No. 421 Mühlner Motorsport		7			28
2	(Portugal) No. 408 Veloso Motorsport		11			22
Pos.	Team	(United Arab Emirates) DUB	(Portugal) POR	(Germany) HOC	(Italy) MUG	Pts.

==== Drivers' Overall Europe Series ====
Pos.	Drivers	Team	Class	(Portugal) POR	(Italy) MON	(Germany) HOC	(Italy) COP	(Italy) MUG	Pts.
1	(Belgium) Rodrigue Gillion (Belgium) Tom Heeren (Belgium) Nico Verdonck	(Germany) No. 401 PROsport Performance AMR	GT4	**13**		10	10		68
2	(United States) Dominique Bastien	(Belgium) No. 978 Speedlover	991	9	7	12			56
3	(Germany) Robert Renauer	(Germany) No. 91 Herberth Motorsport	GT3-Pro	2	3				56
3	(Germany) Robert Renauer	(United Arab Emirates) No. 36 GPX Racing	GT3-Pro				1		56
4	(Germany) Jürgen Häring (Greece) Taki Konstantinou	(Germany) No. 92 Herberth Motorsport	GT3-AM	1	1		17		54
5	(France) Eric Mouez	(Belgium) No. 978 Speedlover	991	9		12			53
5	(France) Eric Mouez	(Belgium) No. 979 Speedlover	991		17				53
5	(France) Eric Mouez	(Italy) No. 918 Duell Race	991				Ret		53
6	(United States) Charles Espenlaub (United States) Joe Foster (United States) Shane Lewis (United States) Charles Putman	(United States) No. 85 CP Racing	GT3-AM			7	2		46
7	(Spain) José Manuel de los Milagros	(Germany) No. 451 Team Avia Sorg Rennsport	GT4			6	12		43
7	(Netherlands) Jeroen Bleekemolen	(Belgium) No. 921 Mühlner Motorsport	991	**3**			9		43
8	(United Kingdom) Gavin Pickering	(Belgium) No. 978 Speedlover	991	9	7				40
9	(Switzerland) Daniel Allemann (Germany) Ralf Bohn (Germany) Alfred Renauer	(Germany) No. 91 Herberth Motorsport	GT3-Pro	2	3				38
10	(Belgium) Olivier Dons	(Belgium) No. 978 Speedlover	991	9					37
10	(Belgium) Olivier Dons	(Belgium) No. 979 Speedlover	991		17				37
Pos.	Drivers	Team	Class	(Portugal) POR	(Italy) MON	(Germany) HOC	(Italy) COP	(Italy) MUG	Pts.

==== Teams' Overall Europe Series ====
Pos.	Team	Class	(Portugal) POR	(Italy) MON	(Germany) HOC	(Italy) COP	(Italy) MUG	Pts.
1	(Germany) No. 401 PROsport Performance AMR	GT4	**13**		10	10		68
2	(Belgium) No. 978 Speedlover	991	9	7	12			56
3	(Germany) No. 92 Herberth Motorsport	GT3-AM	1	1		17		54
4	(United States) No. 85 CP Racing	GT3-AM			7	2		48
5	(Germany) No. 451 Team Avia Sorg Rennsport	GT4			6	12		43
6	(Germany) No. 91 Herberth Motorsport	GT3-Pro	2	3				38
7	(Belgium) No. 421 Mühlner Motorsport	Cayman	**7**					28
7	(Belgium) No. 921 Mühlner Motorsport	991	**3**					28
7	(Netherlands) No. 991 NKPP Racing by Bas Koeten Racing	991			1			28
8	(Portugal) No. 408 Veloso Motorsport	Cayman	11					22
8	(Portugal) No. 412 Parkalgar Racing Team	GT4	14					22
8	(Luxembourg) No. 909 DUWO Racing	991			2			22
9	(United Arab Emirates) No. 36 GPX Racing	GT3-Pro				1		18
9	(Slovakia) No. 707 ARC Bratislava	GTX		6				18
9	(Italy) No. 907 Dinamic Motorsport	991				7		18
9	(Netherlands) No. 416 MDM Motorsport	GT4		14				18
9	(Italy) No. 45 Avelon Formula	PX				20		18
10	(Germany) No. 93 Herberth Motorsport	GT3-AM		2				17
Pos.	Team	Class	(Portugal) POR	(Italy) MON	(Germany) HOC	(Italy) COP	(Italy) MUG	Pts.

==== GT3-Pro Drivers' Europe Series ====
Pos.	Drivers	Team	(Portugal) POR	(Italy) MON	(Germany) HOC	(Italy) COP	(Italy) MUG	Pts.
1	(Germany) Robert Renauer	(Germany) No. 91 Herberth Motorsport	2	3				56
1	(Germany) Robert Renauer	(United Arab Emirates) No. 36 GPX Racing				1		56
2	(Switzerland) Daniel Allemann (Germany) Ralf Bohn (Germany) Alfred Renauer (Germany) Robert Renauer	(Germany) No. 91 Herberth Motorsport	2	3				38
3	(United Arab Emirates) Frédéric Fatien (South Africa) Jordan Grogor (France) Mathieu Jaminet	(United Arab Emirates) No. 36 GPX Racing				1		18
4	(Switzerland) Mauro Calamia (Italy) Matteo Malucelli (Italy) Roberto Pampanini	(Italy) No. 7 Dinamic Motorsport				4		15
5	(Netherlands) Rik Breukers (Netherlands) Henk de Jong (Netherlands) Jaap van Lagen	(Netherlands) No. 19 MP Motorsport				5		11
6	(Switzerland) Mauro Calamia (Italy) Amedeo Pampanini (Switzerland) Nicolas Sturzinger	(Italy) No. 793 Dinamic Motorsport				6		7
	(Switzerland) Stefano Monaco (Italy) Amedeo Pampanini (Switzerland) Nicolas Sturzinger	(Italy) No. 794 Dinamic Motorsport				Ret		0
Pos.	Drivers	Team	(Portugal) POR	(Italy) MON	(Germany) HOC	(Italy) COP	(Italy) MUG	Pts.

==== GT3-Pro Teams' Europe Series ====
Pos.	Team	(Portugal) POR	(Italy) MON	(Germany) HOC	(Italy) COP	(Italy) MUG	Pts.
1	(Germany) No. 91 Herberth Motorsport	2	3				38
2	(United Arab Emirates) No. 36 GPX Racing				1		18
3	(Italy) No. 7 Dinamic Motorsport				4		15
4	(Netherlands) No. 19 MP Motorsport				5		11
5	(Italy) No. 793 Dinamic Motorsport				6		7
	(Italy) No. 794 Dinamic Motorsport				Ret		0
Pos.	Team	(Portugal) POR	(Italy) MON	(Germany) HOC	(Italy) COP	(Italy) MUG	Pts.

==== GT3-AM Drivers' Europe Series ====
Pos.	Drivers	Team	(Portugal) POR	(Italy) MON	(Germany) HOC	(Italy) COP	(Italy) MUG	Pts.
1	(Germany) Jürgen Häring (Greece) Taki Konstantinou	(Germany) No. 92 Herberth Motorsport	1	1		17		54
2	(United States) Charles Espenlaub (United States) Joe Foster (United States) Shane Lewis (United States) Charles Putman	(United States) No. 85 CP Racing			7	2		46
3	(Germany) Tim Müller	(Germany) No. 92 Herberth Motorsport	1			17		35
4	(Germany) Michael Joos (Germany) Marco Seefried	(Germany) No. 92 Herberth Motorsport	1					28
5	(Italy) Corinna Gostner (Italy) David Gostner (Italy) Thomas Gostner	(Italy) No. 58 MP Racing		4		13		25
6	(Germany) Stefan Aust (Austria) Klaus Bachler (Germany) Steffen Görig	(Germany) No. 93 Herberth Motorsport		2				17
7	(Austria) Michael Doppelmayr (Germany) Elia Erhart (Germany) Pierre Kaffer (Germany) Hendrik Still	(Germany) No. 34 Car Collection Motorsport				3		15
8	(Italy) Manuela Gostner (Italy) Giorgio Sernagiotto	(Italy) No. 58 MP Racing		4				14
9	(Germany) Gustav Edelhoff (Germany) Elmar Grimm (Germany) Johannes Dr. Kirchhoff	(Germany) No. 34 Car Collection Motorsport		5				12
10	(Germany) Alfred Renauer	(Germany) No. 92 Herberth Motorsport				17		7
Pos.	Drivers	Team	(Portugal) POR	(Italy) MON	(Germany) HOC	(Italy) COP	(Italy) MUG	Pts.

==== GT3-AM Teams' Europe Series ====
Pos.	Team	(Portugal) POR	(Italy) MON	(Germany) HOC	(Italy) COP	(Italy) MUG	Pts.
1	(Germany) No. 92 Herberth Motorsport	1	1		17		47
2	(United States) No. 85 CP Racing			7	2		46
3	(Italy) No. 58 MP Racing		4		13		14
4	(Germany) No. 93 Herberth Motorsport		2				17
5	(Germany) No. 88 Car Collection Motorsport				3		15
6	(Germany) No. 34 Car Collection Motorsport		5				12
	(Germany) No. 84 HTP Winward Motorsport	Ret					0
	(Germany) No. 22 Wochenspiegel Team Monschau		Ret				0
	(Netherlands) No. 9 Equipe Verschuur		Ret	Ret			0
Pos.	Team	(Portugal) POR	(Italy) MON	(Germany) HOC	(Italy) COP	(Italy) MUG	Pts.

==== GTX Drivers' Europe Series ====
Pos.	Drivers	Team	(Portugal) POR	(Italy) MON	(Germany) HOC	(Italy) COP	(Italy) MUG	Pts.
1	(Slovakia) Mat'o Homola (Slovakia) Miro Konôpka (Slovakia) Mat'o Konopka	(Slovakia) No. 707 ARC Bratislava		6				18
2	(Netherlands) Ruud Olij (Netherlands) Ted van Vliet	(Netherlands) No. 703 JR Motorsport		15				15
3	(Austria) Eike Angermayr (Austria) Laura Kraihamer (Slovakia) Stefan Rosina	(Austria) No. 746 Reiter Engineering		16				11
4	(United States) Dominique Bastien (Thailand) Vutthikorn Inthraphuvasak (Germany) Christian Ried	(Germany) No. 711 Proton Competition			DNS			0
Pos.	Drivers	Team	(Portugal) POR	(Italy) MON	(Germany) HOC	(Italy) COP	(Italy) MUG	Pts.

==== GTX Teams' Europe Series ====
Pos.	Team	(Portugal) POR	(Italy) MON	(Germany) HOC	(Italy) COP	(Italy) MUG	Pts.
1	(Slovakia) No. 707 ARC Bratislava		6				18
2	(Netherlands) No. 703 JR Motorsport		15				15
3	(Austria) No. 746 Reiter Engineering		16				11
4	(Germany) No. 711 Proton Competition			DNS			0
Pos.	Team	(Portugal) POR	(Italy) MON	(Germany) HOC	(Italy) COP	(Italy) MUG	Pts.

==== 991 Drivers' Europe Series ====
Pos.	Drivers	Team	(Portugal) POR	(Italy) MON	(Germany) HOC	(Italy) COP	(Italy) MUG	Pts.
1	(United States) Dominique Bastien	(Belgium) No. 978 Speedlover	9	7	12			56
2	(France) Eric Mouez	(Belgium) No. 978 Speedlover	9		12			53
2	(France) Eric Mouez	(Belgium) No. 979 Speedlover		17				53
3	(United Kingdom) Gavin Pickering	(Belgium) No. 978 Speedlover	9	7				40
4	(Belgium) Olivier Dons	(Belgium) No. 978 Speedlover	9					37
4	(Belgium) Olivier Dons	(Belgium) No. 979 Speedlover		17				37
5	(Belgium) Rolf Lietart	(Belgium) No. 979 Speedlover		17				31
5	(Belgium) Rolf Lietart	(Belgium) No. 978 Speedlover			12			31
6	(Netherlands) Jeroen Bleekemolen (Belgium) Tom Cloet (Germany) Moritz Kranz (Portugal) José Carlos Gomes Castro Vieira	(Belgium) No. 921 Mühlner Motorsport	**3**					28
6	(Netherlands) Gijs Bessem (Netherlands) Harry Hilders (Netherlands) Marcel van Berlo	(Netherlands) No. 991 NKPP Racing by Bas Koeten Racing			1			28
7	(Russia) Andrey Mukovoz (Russia) Sergey Peregudov (Russia) Stanislav Sidoruk	(Luxembourg) No. 909 DUWO Racing			2			22
8	(Netherlands) Jeroen Kreeft	(Belgium) No. 978 Speedlover			12			16
Pos.	Drivers	Team	(Portugal) POR	(Italy) MON	(Germany) HOC	(Italy) COP	(Italy) MUG	Pts.

==== 991 Teams' Europe Series ====
Pos.	Team	(Portugal) POR	(Italy) MON	(Germany) HOC	(Italy) COP	(Italy) MUG	Pts.
1	(Belgium) No. 978 Speedlover	9	7	12			56
2	(Belgium) No. 921 Mühlner Motorsport	**3**					28
2	(Netherlands) No. 991 NKPP Racing by Bas Koeten Racing			1			28
3	(Luxembourg) No. 909 DUWO Racing			2			22
4	(Belgium) No. 979 Speedlover		17				15
Pos.	Team	(Portugal) POR	(Italy) MON	(Germany) HOC	(Italy) COP	(Italy) MUG	Pts.

==== GT4 Drivers' Europe Series ====
Pos.	Drivers	Team	(Portugal) POR	(Italy) MON	(Germany) HOC	(Italy) COP	(Italy) MUG	Pts.
1	(Belgium) Rodrigue Gillion (Belgium) Tom Heeren (Belgium) Nico Verdonck	(Germany) No. 401 PROsport Performance AMR	**13**		10			50
2	(Austria) Constantin Schöll	(Germany) No. 401 PROsport Performance AMR	**13**					28
2	(Germany) Björn Simon (Spain) José Manuel de los Milagros (Germany) Heiko Eichenberg (Germany) Olaf Meyer	(Germany) No. 451 Team Avia Sorg Rennsport			6			28
3	(Netherlands) Tim Coronel (Netherlands) Tom Coronel (Netherlands) Jan Jaap van Roon	(Netherlands) No. 416 MDM Motorsport		14				18
	(Portugal) André Antunes (Netherlands) Fred Blok (Portugal) José Monroy (Brazil) Joaquim Penteado (Portugal) Alvaro Ramos	(Portugal) No. 412 Parkalgar Racing Team	Ret					0
Pos.	Drivers	Team	(Portugal) POR	(Italy) MON	(Germany) HOC	(Italy) COP	(Italy) MUG	Pts.

==== GT4 Teams' Europe Series ====
Pos.	Team	(Portugal) POR	(Italy) MON	(Germany) HOC	(Italy) COP	(Italy) MUG	Pts.
1	(Germany) No. 401 PROsport Performance AMR	**13**					50
2	(Germany) No. 451 Team Avia Sorg Rennsport			6			28
3	(Portugal) No. 412 Parkalgar Racing Team	14					22
4	(Netherlands) No. 416 MDM Motorsport		14				18
Pos.	Team	(Portugal) POR	(Italy) MON	(Germany) HOC	(Italy) COP	(Italy) MUG	Pts.

==== Cayman Drivers' Europe Series ====
Pos.	Drivers	Team	(Portugal) POR	(Italy) MON	(Germany) HOC	(Italy) COP	(Italy) MUG	Pts.
1	(Luxembourg) Daniel Bohr (Germany) Thorsten Jung (Germany) Axel Sartingen (Germany) Daniel Schwerfeld	(Belgium) No. 421 Mühlner Motorsport	7					28
2	(Portugal) José Costa (Portugal) Pedro Marreiros (France) Jean-Roch Piat (Portugal) Paulo Pinheiro (Portugal) Mariano Pires	(Portugal) No. 408 Veloso Motorsport	11					22
Pos.	Drivers	Team	(Portugal) POR	(Italy) MON	(Germany) HOC	(Italy) COP	(Italy) MUG	Pts.

==== Cayman Teams' Europe Series ====
Pos.	Team	(Portugal) POR	(Italy) MON	(Germany) HOC	(Italy) COP	(Italy) MUG	Pts.
1	(Belgium) No. 421 Mühlner Motorsport	7					28
2	(Portugal) No. 408 Veloso Motorsport	11					22
Pos.	Team	(Portugal) POR	(Italy) MON	(Germany) HOC	(Italy) COP	(Italy) MUG	Pts.

== See also ==
- 24H Series
- 2020 Dubai 24 Hour
