= 2020 Coppa Florio =

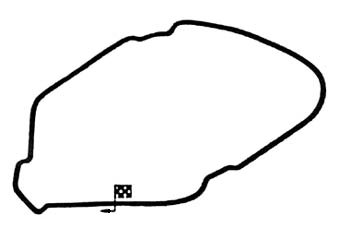
The layout of the Autodromo di Pergusa

The 2020 Coppa Florio or 2020 Coppa Florio Hankook 12 Hours of Sicily was the first running of the Coppa Florio since 1981. It was the fifth round of both the 2020 24H GT Series and the 2020 24H TCE Series, the fourth round of the Europe Series and was held from 9 to 11 October at the Autodromo di Pergusa. It was the first international racing series to take place at the Autodromo di Pergusa since 2012. The race was won by Frédéric Fatien, Jordan Grogor, Mathieu Jaminet and Robert Renauer. Miklas Born and Autorama Motorsport by Wolf-Power Racing secured the TCE Europe Drivers' and Teams' Championship after they won.

== Schedule ==
The race was split into two parts, the first being 6 hours and the second being the same distance.

Date	Time (local: CEST)	Event	Distance
Friday, 9 October	10:00 - 11:30	Practice (GT and TCE)	90 Mins
Friday, 9 October	14:00 - 14:45	Qualifying - TCE	45 Mins
Friday, 9 October	15:00 - 15:45	Qualifying - GT	45 Mins
Saturday, 10 October	11:00	Race (Part 1)	6 Hours
Sunday, 11 October	11:00	Race (Part 2)	6 Hours

== Entry list ==
A total of twenty-three cars were entered for the event; 17 GT, 5 TCE and 1 Proto car.

Team	Car	No.	Drivers
GT3-Pro (5 entries)
(Italy) Dinamic Motorsport	Porsche 911 GT3 R	7	(Switzerland) Mauro Calamia (Italy) Matteo Malucelli (Italy) Roberto Pampanini
(Italy) Dinamic Motorsport	Lamborghini Huracán Super Trofeo Evo	793	(Switzerland) Stefano Monaco (Italy) Amedeo Pampanini (Switzerland) Nicolas Sturzinger
(Italy) Dinamic Motorsport	Lamborghini Huracán Super Trofeo Evo	794	(Switzerland) Mauro Calamia (Italy) Amedeo Pampanini (Switzerland) Nicolas Sturzinger
(Netherlands) MP Motorsport	Mercedes-AMG GT3	19	(Netherlands) Rik Breukers (Netherlands) Henk de Jong (Netherlands) Jaap van Lagen
(United Arab Emirates) GPX Racing	Porsche 911 GT3 R	36	(United Arab Emirates) Frédéric Fatien (South Africa) Jordan Grogor (France) Mathieu Jaminet (Germany) Robert Renauer
GT3-Am (4 entries)
(Italy) MP Racing	Mercedes-AMG GT3 Evo	58	(Italy) Corinna Gostner (Italy) David Gostner (Italy) Thomas Gostner
(United States) CP Racing	Mercedes-AMG GT3 Evo	85	(United States) Charles Espenlaub (United States) Joe Foster (United States) Shane Lewis (United States) Charles Putman
(Germany) Car Collection Motorsport	Audi R8 LMS Evo	88	(Austria) Michael Doppelmayr (Germany) Elia Erhart (Germany) Pierre Kaffer (Germany) Hendrik Still
(Germany) Herberth Motorsport	Porsche 911 GT3 R	92	(Germany) Jürgen Häring (Greece) Taki Konstantinou (Germany) Tim Müller (Germany) Alfred Renauer
991 (5 entries)
(Italy) Dinamic Motorsport	Porsche 991 GT3 Cup II	907	(Italy) Simone Iaquinta (Italy) Matteo Malucelli (Switzerland) Stefano Monaco (Italy) Roberto Pampanini
(Italy) Tempo .S.R.L.	Porsche 991 GT3 Cup II	916	(Italy) Davide di Benedetto (Italy) Michele Merendino (Italy) Giuseppe Nicolosi (Italy) Simone Patrinicola
(Italy) Fulgenzi Racing	Porsche 991 GT3 Cup II	917	(Japan) Shintaro Akatsu (Italy) Gianfranco Bronzini (Italy) Enrico Fulgenzi (Italy) Gianluca Spata (Netherlands) Sandra van der Sloot
(Italy) Fulgenzi Racing	Porsche 991 GT3 Cup II	923	(Netherlands) Jeroen Bleekemolen (Argentina) Pablo Otero (Italy) Walter Palazzo (Italy) Giosué Rizzuto
(Italy) Duell Race	Porsche 991 GT3 Cup II	918	(Italy) Gianluca Carboni (United Kingdom) Steven Liquorish (France) Eric Mouez
GT4 (3 entries)
(Germany) PROsport Performance AMR	Aston Martin Vantage AMR GT4	401	(Belgium) Rodrigue Gillion (Belgium) Tom Heeren (Belgium) Nico Verdonck
(Netherlands) Las Moras by Equipe Verschuur	McLaren 570S GT4	409	(Netherlands) Liesette Braams (Netherlands) Luc Braams (Netherlands) Max Braams
(Germany) Team Avia Sorg Rennsport	BMW M4 GT4	451	(Spain) Alvaro Fontes (Spain) Yannick Guerra Dorribo (Spain) José Manuel de los Milagros (Spain) Sergio Paulet
TCR (4 entries)
(Netherlands) Red Camel-Jordans.nl	CUPRA León TCR	101	(Netherlands) Ivo Breukers (Netherlands) Luc Breukers
(Germany) Vmax Engineering	Opel Astra TCR	105	(United States) Charles Espenlaub (United States) Shane Lewis
(Switzerland) Autorama Motorsport by Wolf-Power Racing	Volkswagen Golf GTI TCR	112	(Switzerland) Miklas Born (Switzerland) Fabian Danz (Austria) Constantin Kletzer
(Belgium) AC Motorsport	Audi RS 3 LMS TCR	188	(United Kingdom) Ricky Coomber (United Kingdom) James Kaye (Germany) Marcus Menden
TCX (1 entry)
(Netherlands) JR Motorsport	BMW M3 E92	703	(Netherlands) Willem Meijer (Netherlands) Ted van Vliet
PX (1 entry)
(Italy) Avelon Formula	Wolf GB08 Tornado	45	(Italy) Ivan Bellarosa (Italy) Guglielmo Belotti

== Results ==
=== Practice ===
Fastest in class in bold.

Pos	Class	No.	Team	Drivers	Car	Time	Laps
1	**PX**	**45**	**(Italy) Avelon Formula**	**(Italy) Ivan Bellarosa** **(Italy) Guglielmo Belotti**	**Wolf GB08 Tornado**	**1:34.460**	**18**
2	**GT3-Pro**	**36**	**(United Arab Emirates) GPX Racing**	**(United Arab Emirates) Frédéric Fatien** **(South Africa) Jordan Grogor** **(France) Mathieu Jaminet** **(Germany) Robert Renauer**	**Porsche 911 GT3 R**	**1:36.360**	**39**
3	GT3-Pro	19	(Netherlands) MP Motorsport	(Netherlands) Rik Breukers (Netherlands) Henk de Jong (Netherlands) Jaap van Lagen	Mercedes-AMG GT3	1:37.160	38
4	**991**	**907**	**(Italy) Dinamic Motorsport**	**(Italy) Simone Iaquinta** **(Italy) Matteo Malucelli** **(Switzerland) Stefano Monaco** **(Italy) Roberto Pampanini**	**Porsche 991 GT3 Cup II**	**1:37.472**	**39**
5	**GT3-Am**	**85**	**(United States) CP Racing**	**(United States) Charles Espenlaub** **(United States) Joe Foster** **(United States) Shane Lewis** **(United States) Charles Putman**	**Mercedes-AMG GT3 Evo**	**1:37.512**	**33**
6	GT3-Pro	7	(Italy) Dinamic Motorsport	(Switzerland) Mauro Calamia (Italy) Matteo Malucelli (Italy) Roberto Pampanini	Porsche 911 GT3 R	1:37.567	12
7	GT3-Am	88	(Germany) Car Collection Motorsport	(Austria) Michael Doppelmayr (Germany) Elia Erhart (Germany) Pierre Kaffer (Germany) Hendrik Still	Audi R8 LMS Evo	1:38.441	39
8	GT3-Am	92	(Germany) Herberth Motorsport	(Germany) Jürgen Häring (Greece) Taki Konstantinou (Germany) Tim Müller (Germany) Alfred Renauer	Porsche 911 GT3 R	1:39.653	36
9	GT3-Pro	794	(Italy) Dinamic Motorsport	(Switzerland) Mauro Calamia (Italy) Amedeo Pampanini (Switzerland) Nicolas Sturzinger	Lamborghini Huracán Super Trofeo Evo	1:39.918	18
10	GT3-Am	58	(Italy) MP Racing	(Italy) Corinna Gostner (Italy) David Gostner (Italy) Thomas Gostner	Mercedes-AMG GT3 Evo	1:39.996	38
11	991	923	(Italy) Fulgenzi Racing	(Netherlands) Jeroen Bleekemolen (Argentina) Pablo Otero (Italy) Walter Palazzo (Italy) Giosué Rizzuto	Porsche 991 GT3 Cup II	1:40.420	36
12	991	916	(Italy) Tempo .S.R.L.	(Italy) Davide di Benedetto (Italy) Michele Merendino (Italy) Giuseppe Nicolosi (Italy) Simone Patrinicola	Porsche 991 GT3 Cup II	1:40.784	33
13	GT3-Pro	793	(Italy) Dinamic Motorsport	(Switzerland) Stefano Monaco (Italy) Amedeo Pampanini (Switzerland) Nicolas Sturzinger	Lamborghini Huracán Super Trofeo Evo	1:40.956	34
14	991	918	(Italy) Duell Race	(Italy) Gianluca Carboni (United Kingdom) Steven Liquorish (France) Eric Mouez	Porsche 991 GT3 Cup II	1:42.786	34
15	991	917	(Italy) Fulgenzi Racing	(Japan) Shintaro Akatsu (Italy) Gianfranco Bronzini (Italy) Enrico Fulgenzi (Italy) Gianluca Spata (Netherlands) Sandra van der Sloot	Porsche 991 GT3 Cup II	1:45.684	35
16	**GT4**	**409**	**(Netherlands) Las Moras by Equipe Verschuur**	**(Netherlands) Liesette Braams** **(Netherlands) Luc Braams** **(Netherlands) Max Braams**	**McLaren 570S GT4**	**1:46.403**	**23**
17	GT4	401	(Germany) PROsport Performance AMR	(Belgium) Rodrigue Gillion (Belgium) Tom Heeren (Belgium) Nico Verdonck	Aston Martin Vantage AMR GT4	1:47.198	28
18	**TCR**	**101**	**(Netherlands) Red Camel-Jordans.nl**	**(Netherlands) Ivo Breukers** **(Netherlands) Luc Breukers**	**CUPRA León TCR**	**1:47.464**	**23**
19	TCR	105	(Germany) Vmax Engineering	(United States) Charles Espenlaub (United States) Shane Lewis	Opel Astra TCR	1:48.275	10
20	TCR	112	(Switzerland) Autorama Motorsport by Wolf-Power Racing	(Switzerland) Miklas Born (Switzerland) Fabian Danz (Austria) Constantin Kletzer	Volkswagen Golf GTI TCR	1:48.977	27
21	GT4	451	(Germany) Team Avia Sorg Rennsport	(Spain) Alvaro Fontes (Spain) Yannick Guerra Dorribo (Spain) José Manuel de los Milagros (Spain) Sergio Paulet	BMW M4 GT4	1:49.874	36
22	TCR	188	(Belgium) AC Motorsport	(United Kingdom) Ricky Coomber (United Kingdom) James Kaye (Germany) Marcus Menden	Audi RS 3 LMS TCR	1:52.452	32
23	**TCX**	**703**	**(Netherlands) JR Motorsport**	**(Netherlands) Willem Meijer** **(Netherlands) Ted van Vliet**	**BMW M3 E92**		

=== Qualifying ===
==== GT ====
Fastest in class in bold.

Pos	Class	No.	Team	Drivers	Car	Time	Laps
1	**GT3-Pro**	**19**	**(Netherlands) MP Motorsport**	**(Netherlands) Rik Breukers** **(Netherlands) Henk de Jong** **(Netherlands) Jaap van Lagen**	**Mercedes-AMG GT3**	**1:34.815**	**18**
2	**PX**	**45**	**(Italy) Avelon Formula**	**(Italy) Ivan Bellarosa** **(Italy) Guglielmo Belotti**	**Wolf GB08 Tornado**	**1:34.850**	**18**
3	GT3-Pro	36	(United Arab Emirates) GPX Racing	(United Arab Emirates) Frédéric Fatien (South Africa) Jordan Grogor (France) Mathieu Jaminet (Germany) Robert Renauer	Porsche 911 GT3 R	1:35.258	11
4	**GT3-Am**	**88**	**(Germany) Car Collection Motorsport**	**(Austria) Michael Doppelmayr** **(Germany) Elia Erhart** **(Germany) Pierre Kaffer** **(Germany) Hendrik Still**	**Audi R8 LMS Evo**	**1:35.973**	**16**
5	GT3-Pro	7	(Italy) Dinamic Motorsport	(Switzerland) Mauro Calamia (Italy) Matteo Malucelli (Italy) Roberto Pampanini	Porsche 911 GT3 R	1:36.016	22
6	GT3-Am	92	(Germany) Herberth Motorsport	(Germany) Jürgen Häring (Greece) Taki Konstantinou (Germany) Tim Müller (Germany) Alfred Renauer	Porsche 911 GT3 R	1:36.369	21
7	GT3-Am	85	(United States) CP Racing	(United States) Charles Espenlaub (United States) Joe Foster (United States) Shane Lewis (United States) Charles Putman	Mercedes-AMG GT3 Evo	1:37.366	12
8	GT3-Pro	793	(Italy) Dinamic Motorsport	(Switzerland) Stefano Monaco (Italy) Amedeo Pampanini (Switzerland) Nicolas Sturzinger	Lamborghini Huracán Super Trofeo Evo	1:37.380	21
9	**991**	**917**	**(Italy) Fulgenzi Racing**	**(Japan) Shintaro Akatsu** **(Italy) Gianfranco Bronzini** **(Italy) Enrico Fulgenzi** **(Italy) Gianluca Spata** **(Netherlands) Sandra van der Sloot**	**Porsche 991 GT3 Cup II**	**1:37.384**	**21**
10	991	907	(Italy) Dinamic Motorsport	(Italy) Simone Iaquinta (Italy) Matteo Malucelli (Switzerland) Stefano Monaco (Italy) Roberto Pampanini	Porsche 991 GT3 Cup II	1:37.570	13
11	GT3-Am	58	(Italy) MP Racing	(Italy) Corinna Gostner (Italy) David Gostner (Italy) Thomas Gostner	Mercedes-AMG GT3 Evo	1:38.252	18
12	991	923	(Italy) Fulgenzi Racing	(Netherlands) Jeroen Bleekemolen (Argentina) Pablo Otero (Italy) Walter Palazzo (Italy) Giosué Rizzuto	Porsche 991 GT3 Cup II	1:39.147	11
13	991	916	(Italy) Tempo .S.R.L.	(Italy) Davide di Benedetto (Italy) Michele Merendino (Italy) Giuseppe Nicolosi (Italy) Simone Patrinicola	Porsche 991 GT3 Cup II	1:39.311	15
14	GT3-Pro	794	(Italy) Dinamic Motorsport	(Switzerland) Mauro Calamia (Italy) Amedeo Pampanini (Switzerland) Nicolas Sturzinger	Lamborghini Huracán Super Trofeo Evo	1:40.806	15
15	991	918	(Italy) Duell Race	(Italy) Gianluca Carboni (United Kingdom) Steven Liquorish (France) Eric Mouez	Porsche 991 GT3 Cup II	1:42.462	20
16	**GT4**	**409**	**(Netherlands) Las Moras by Equipe Verschuur**	**(Netherlands) Liesette Braams** **(Netherlands) Luc Braams** **(Netherlands) Max Braams**	**McLaren 570S GT4**	**1:44.085**	**19**
17	GT4	401	(Germany) PROsport Performance AMR	(Belgium) Rodrigue Gillion (Belgium) Tom Heeren (Belgium) Nico Verdonck	Aston Martin Vantage AMR GT4	1:45.196	9
18	GT4	451	(Germany) Team Avia Sorg Rennsport	(Spain) Alvaro Fontes (Spain) Yannick Guerra Dorribo (Spain) José Manuel de los Milagros (Spain) Sergio Paulet	BMW M4 GT4	1:47.469	20

==== TCE ====
Fastest in class in bold.

Pos	Class	No.	Team	Drivers	Car	Time	Laps
1	**TCX**	**703**	**(Netherlands) JR Motorsport**	**(Netherlands) Willem Meijer** **(Netherlands) Ted van Vliet**	**BMW M3 E92**	**1:43.751**	**15**
2	**TCR**	**112**	**(Switzerland) Autorama Motorsport by Wolf-Power Racing**	**(Switzerland) Miklas Born** **(Switzerland) Fabian Danz** **(Austria) Constantin Kletzer**	**Volkswagen Golf GTI TCR**	**1:45.940**	**12**
3	TCR	101	(Netherlands) Red Camel-Jordans.nl	(Netherlands) Ivo Breukers (Netherlands) Luc Breukers	CUPRA León TCR	1:47.464	23
4	TCR	105	(Germany) Vmax Engineering	(United States) Charles Espenlaub (United States) Shane Lewis	Opel Astra TCR	1:46.955	12
5	TCR	188	(Belgium) AC Motorsport	(United Kingdom) Ricky Coomber (United Kingdom) James Kaye (Germany) Marcus Menden	Audi RS 3 LMS TCR	1:48.012	16

=== Race ===
==== Part 1 ====
Class winner in bold.

Pos	Class	No.	Team	Drivers	Car	Time	Laps
1	**GT3-Pro**	**36**	**(United Arab Emirates) GPX Racing**	**(United Arab Emirates) Frédéric Fatien** **(South Africa) Jordan Grogor** **(France) Mathieu Jaminet** **(Germany) Robert Renauer**	**Porsche 911 GT3 R**	**6:00:41.457**	**189**
2	GT3-Pro	19	(Netherlands) MP Motorsport	(Netherlands) Rik Breukers (Netherlands) Henk de Jong (Netherlands) Jaap van Lagen	Mercedes-AMG GT3	+1 Lap	188
3	**GT3-Am**	**85**	**(United States) CP Racing**	**(United States) Charles Espenlaub** **(United States) Joe Foster** **(United States) Shane Lewis** **(United States) Charles Putman**	**Mercedes-AMG GT3 Evo**	**+2 Laps**	**187**
4	GT3-Pro	7	(Italy) Dinamic Motorsport	(Switzerland) Mauro Calamia (Italy) Matteo Malucelli (Italy) Roberto Pampanini	Porsche 911 GT3 R	+4 Laps	185
5	GT3-Am	88	(Germany) Car Collection Motorsport	(Austria) Michael Doppelmayr (Germany) Elia Erhart (Germany) Pierre Kaffer (Germany) Hendrik Still	Audi R8 LMS Evo	+4 Laps	185
6	GT3-Am	92	(Germany) Herberth Motorsport	(Germany) Jürgen Häring (Greece) Taki Konstantinou (Germany) Tim Müller (Germany) Alfred Renauer	Porsche 911 GT3 R	+8 Laps	181
7	**991**	**907**	**(Italy) Dinamic Motorsport**	**(Italy) Simone Iaquinta** **(Italy) Matteo Malucelli** **(Switzerland) Stefano Monaco** **(Italy) Roberto Pampanini**	**Porsche 991 GT3 Cup II**	**+10 Laps**	**179**
8	991	916	(Italy) Tempo .S.R.L.	(Italy) Davide di Benedetto (Italy) Michele Merendino (Italy) Giuseppe Nicolosi (Italy) Simone Patrinicola	Porsche 991 GT3 Cup II	+15 Laps	174
9	GT3-Pro	793	(Italy) Dinamic Motorsport	(Switzerland) Stefano Monaco (Italy) Amedeo Pampanini (Switzerland) Nicolas Sturzinger	Lamborghini Huracán Super Trofeo Evo	+15 Laps	174
10	**TCR**	**112**	**(Switzerland) Autorama Motorsport by Wolf-Power Racing**	**(Switzerland) Miklas Born** **(Switzerland) Fabian Danz** **(Austria) Constantin Kletzer**	**Volkswagen Golf GTI TCR**	**+17 Laps**	**172**
11	991	923	(Italy) Fulgenzi Racing	(Netherlands) Jeroen Bleekemolen (Argentina) Pablo Otero (Italy) Walter Palazzo (Italy) Giosué Rizzuto	Porsche 991 GT3 Cup II	+17 Laps	172
12	**GT4**	**401**	**(Germany) PROsport Performance AMR**	**(Belgium) Rodrigue Gillion** **(Belgium) Tom Heeren** **(Belgium) Nico Verdonck**	**Aston Martin Vantage AMR GT4**	**+19 Laps**	**170**
13	GT4	451	(Germany) Team Avia Sorg Rennsport	(Spain) Alvaro Fontes (Spain) Yannick Guerra Dorribo (Spain) José Manuel de los Milagros (Spain) Sergio Paulet	BMW M4 GT4	+20 Laps	169
14 DNF	TCR	101	(Netherlands) Red Camel-Jordans.nl	(Netherlands) Ivo Breukers (Netherlands) Luc Breukers	CUPRA León TCR	+26 Laps	163
15	TCR	188	(Belgium) AC Motorsport	(United Kingdom) Ricky Coomber (United Kingdom) James Kaye (Germany) Marcus Menden	Audi RS 3 LMS TCR	+29 Laps	160
16 DNF	GT3-Am	58	(Italy) MP Racing	(Italy) Corinna Gostner (Italy) David Gostner (Italy) Thomas Gostner	Mercedes-AMG GT3 Evo	+31 Laps	158
17	GT4	409	(Netherlands) Las Moras by Equipe Verschuur	(Netherlands) Liesette Braams (Netherlands) Luc Braams (Netherlands) Max Braams	McLaren 570S GT4	+61 Laps	128
18 DNF	991	917	(Italy) Fulgenzi Racing	(Japan) Shintaro Akatsu (Italy) Gianfranco Bronzini (Italy) Enrico Fulgenzi (Italy) Gianluca Spata (Netherlands) Sandra van der Sloot	Porsche 991 GT3 Cup II	+68 Laps	121
19 DNF	991	918	(Italy) Duell Race	(Italy) Gianluca Carboni (United Kingdom) Steven Liquorish (France) Eric Mouez	Porsche 991 GT3 Cup II	+92 Laps	97
20	**PX**	**45**	**(Italy) Avelon Formula**	**(Italy) Ivan Bellarosa** **(Italy) Guglielmo Belotti**	**Wolf GB08 Tornado**	**+130 Laps**	**59**
DNF	TCX	703	(Netherlands) JR Motorsport	(Netherlands) Willem Meijer (Netherlands) Ted van Vliet	BMW M3 E92	Retired	49
DNF	GT3-Pro	794	(Italy) Dinamic Motorsport	(Switzerland) Mauro Calamia (Italy) Amedeo Pampanini (Switzerland) Nicolas Sturzinger	Lamborghini Huracán Super Trofeo Evo	Engine	5
DNF	TCR	105	(Germany) Vmax Engineering	(United States) Charles Espenlaub (United States) Shane Lewis	Opel Astra TCR	Engine	4

==== Part 2 ====
Class winner in bold.

Pos	Class	No.	Team	Drivers	Car	Time	Laps
1	**GT3-Pro**	**36**	**(United Arab Emirates) GPX Racing**	**(United Arab Emirates) Frédéric Fatien** **(South Africa) Jordan Grogor** **(France) Mathieu Jaminet** **(Germany) Robert Renauer**	**Porsche 911 GT3 R**	**6:00:32.495**	**374**
2	**GT3-Am**	**85**	**(United States) CP Racing**	**(United States) Charles Espenlaub** **(United States) Joe Foster** **(United States) Shane Lewis** **(United States) Charles Putman**	**Mercedes-AMG GT3 Evo**	**+5 Laps**	**369**
3	GT3-Am	88	(Germany) Car Collection Motorsport	(Austria) Michael Doppelmayr (Germany) Elia Erhart (Germany) Pierre Kaffer (Germany) Hendrik Still	Audi R8 LMS Evo	+6 Laps	368
4	GT3-Pro	7	(Italy) Dinamic Motorsport	(Switzerland) Mauro Calamia (Italy) Matteo Malucelli (Italy) Roberto Pampanini	Porsche 911 GT3 R	+8 Laps	366
5	GT3-Pro	19	(Netherlands) MP Motorsport	(Netherlands) Rik Breukers (Netherlands) Henk de Jong (Netherlands) Jaap van Lagen	Mercedes-AMG GT3	+15 Laps	359
6 DNF	GT3-Pro	793	(Italy) Dinamic Motorsport	(Switzerland) Stefano Monaco (Italy) Amedeo Pampanini (Switzerland) Nicolas Sturzinger	Lamborghini Huracán Super Trofeo Evo	+25 Laps	349
7	**991**	**907**	**(Italy) Dinamic Motorsport**	**(Italy) Simone Iaquinta** **(Italy) Matteo Malucelli** **(Switzerland) Stefano Monaco** **(Italy) Roberto Pampanini**	**Porsche 991 GT3 Cup II**	**+31 Laps**	**343**
8	**TCR**	**112**	**(Switzerland) Autorama Motorsport by Wolf-Power Racing**	**(Switzerland) Miklas Born** **(Switzerland) Fabian Danz** **(Austria) Constantin Kletzer**	**Volkswagen Golf GTI TCR**	**+33 Laps**	**341**
9	991	923	(Italy) Fulgenzi Racing	(Netherlands) Jeroen Bleekemolen (Argentina) Pablo Otero (Italy) Walter Palazzo (Italy) Giosué Rizzuto	Porsche 991 GT3 Cup II	+38 Laps	336
10	**GT4**	**401**	**(Germany) PROsport Performance AMR**	**(Belgium) Rodrigue Gillion** **(Belgium) Tom Heeren** **(Belgium) Nico Verdonck**	**Aston Martin Vantage AMR GT4**	**+41 Laps**	**333**
11	991	916	(Italy) Tempo .S.R.L.	(Italy) Davide di Benedetto (Italy) Michele Merendino (Italy) Giuseppe Nicolosi (Italy) Simone Patrinicola	Porsche 991 GT3 Cup II	+44 Laps	330
12	GT4	451	(Germany) Team Avia Sorg Rennsport	(Spain) Alvaro Fontes (Spain) Yannick Guerra Dorribo (Spain) José Manuel de los Milagros (Spain) Sergio Paulet	BMW M4 GT4	+46 Laps	328
13	GT3-Am	58	(Italy) MP Racing	(Italy) Corinna Gostner (Italy) David Gostner (Italy) Thomas Gostner	Mercedes-AMG GT3 Evo	+48 Laps	326
14	TCR	188	(Belgium) AC Motorsport	(United Kingdom) Ricky Coomber (United Kingdom) James Kaye (Germany) Marcus Menden	Audi RS 3 LMS TCR	+50 Laps	324
15	TCR	101	(Netherlands) Red Camel-Jordans.nl	(Netherlands) Ivo Breukers (Netherlands) Luc Breukers	CUPRA León TCR	+77 Laps	297
16 DNF	GT4	409	(Netherlands) Las Moras by Equipe Verschuur	(Netherlands) Liesette Braams (Netherlands) Luc Braams (Netherlands) Max Braams	McLaren 570S GT4	+135 Laps	239
17 DNF	GT3-Am	92	(Germany) Herberth Motorsport	(Germany) Jürgen Häring (Greece) Taki Konstantinou (Germany) Tim Müller (Germany) Alfred Renauer	Porsche 911 GT3 R	+139 Laps	235
18	991	917	(Italy) Fulgenzi Racing	(Japan) Shintaro Akatsu (Italy) Gianfranco Bronzini (Italy) Enrico Fulgenzi (Italy) Gianluca Spata (Netherlands) Sandra van der Sloot	Porsche 991 GT3 Cup II	+147 Laps	227
DNF	991	918	(Italy) Duell Race	(Italy) Gianluca Carboni (United Kingdom) Steven Liquorish (France) Eric Mouez	Porsche 991 GT3 Cup II	Retired	100
20	**PX**	**45**	**(Italy) Avelon Formula**	**(Italy) Ivan Bellarosa** **(Italy) Guglielmo Belotti**	**Wolf GB08 Tornado**	**+346 Laps**	**28**
DNF	TCX	703	(Netherlands) JR Motorsport	(Netherlands) Willem Meijer (Netherlands) Ted van Vliet	BMW M3 E92	Retired	49
DNF	GT3-Pro	794	(Italy) Dinamic Motorsport	(Switzerland) Mauro Calamia (Italy) Amedeo Pampanini (Switzerland) Nicolas Sturzinger	Lamborghini Huracán Super Trofeo Evo	Engine	5
DNF	TCR	105	(Germany) Vmax Engineering	(United States) Charles Espenlaub (United States) Shane Lewis	Opel Astra TCR	Engine	4

24H Series
Previous race: 16 Hours of Hockenheimring	2020 season	Next race: 12 Hours of Mugello
