= 2020 24 Hours of Portimão =

Portuguese automobile racing event

Layout of the Algarve International Circuit

The 2020 Hankook 24 Hours of Portimão was the fourth running of the 24 Hours of Portimão automobile race. It was also the second round of both the 2020 24H GT Series and the 2020 24H TCE Series, the second round of the Championship of the Continents Series and first of the Europe Series, being held from 13 to 14 June at the Algarve International Circuit. The race was won by Jürgen Häring, Michael Joos, Taki Konstantinou, Tim Müller, and Marco Seefried, driving for Herberth Motorsport.

== Schedule ==
Date	Time (local: WEST)	Event	Distance
Friday, 12 June	13:00 - 15:00	Practice (GT and TCE)	2 Hours
Friday, 12 June	17:15 - 18:00	Qualifying - TCE	45 Mins
Friday, 12 June	18:15 - 19:00	Qualifying - GT	45 Mins
Friday, 12 June	21:00 - 22:30	Night Practice	90 Mins
Saturday, 13 June	11:00	Start Grid	1 Hour
Saturday, 13 June	12:00	Race	24 Hours
Sunday, 14 June	12:00	Race	24 Hours

== Entry list ==
A total of fifteen cars were entered for the event; 9 GT and 6 TCE cars.

Team	Car	No.	Drivers
GT3-Pro (1 entry)
(Germany) Herberth Motorsport	Porsche 911 GT3 R (2019)	91	(Switzerland) Daniel Allemann (Germany) Ralf Bohn (Germany) Alfred Renauer (Germany) Robert Renauer
GT3-Am (2 entries)
(Germany) HTP Winward Motorsport	Mercedes-AMG GT3 (2019)	84	(Netherlands) Indy Dontje (United Kingdom) Philip Ellis (United States) Bryce Ward (United States) Russell Ward
(Germany) Herberth Motorsport	Porsche 911 GT3 R (2019)	92	(Germany) Jürgen Häring (Germany) Michael Joos (Greece) Taki Konstantinou (Germany) Tim Müller (Germany) Marco Seefried
991 (2 entries)
(Belgium) Mühlner Motorsport	Porsche 991 GT3 II Cup	921	(Netherlands) Jeroen Bleekemolen (Belgium) Tom Cloet (Germany) Moritz Kranz (Portugal) José Carlos Gomes Castro Vieira
(Belgium) Speed Lover	Porsche 991 GT3 II Cup	978	(United States) Dominique Bastien (Belgium) Olivier Dons (France) Eric Mouez (United Kingdom) Gavin Pickering
GT4 (2 entries)
(Germany) PROsport Performance AMR	Aston Martin Vantage AMR GT4	401	(Belgium) Rodrigue Gillion (Belgium) Tom Heeren (Austria) Constantin Schöll (Belgium) Nico Verdonck
(Portugal) Parkalgar Racing Team	Mercedes-AMG GT4	412	(Portugal) André Antunes (Netherlands) Fred Blok (Portugal) Jose Monroy (Brazil) Joaquim Penteado (Portugal) Alvaro Ramos
Cayman (2 entries)
(Portugal) Veloso Motorsport	Porsche Cayman GT4 Clubsport (981)	408	(Portugal) José Costa (Portugal) Pedro Marreiros (France) Jean-Roch Piat (Portugal) Paulo Pinheiro (Portugal) Mariano Pires
(Belgium) Mühlner Motorsport	Porsche 718 Cayman GT4 Clubsport (982)	421	(Luxembourg) Daniel Bohr (Germany) Moritz Kranz (Germany) Thorsten Jung (Germany) Axel Sartingen (Germany) Daniel Schwerfeld
TCR (6 entries)
(Switzerland) Autorama Motorsport by Wolf-Power Racing	Volkswagen Golf GTI TCR	1	(Switzerland) Christopher Lenz (Switzerland) Yannick Mettler (Switzerland) Jérome Ogay (Switzerland) Jasmin Preisig (Switzerland) Stefan Tanner
(Switzerland) Autorama Motorsport by Wolf-Power Racing	Volkswagen Golf GTI TCR	112	(Switzerland) Miklas Born (Finland) Antti Buri (Italy) Roberto Ferri (Finland) Kari-Pekka Laaksonen (Switzerland) Yannick Mettler
(Netherlands) Red Camel-Jordans.nl	CUPRA León TCR	101	(Netherlands) Ivo Breukers (Netherlands) Luc Breukers (Netherlands) Ric Breukers
(Belgium) Comtoyou Team Audi Sport	Audi RS 3 LMS TCR	117	(France) Nathanaël Berthon (Belgium) Nicolas Baert (Netherlands) Tom Coronel
(France) Code Racing Development	Volkswagen Golf GTI TCR	124	(France) Philippe Baffoun (France) Thierry Boyer (France) Thierry Chkondali (France) Bruno Derossi (France) Quentin Giordano
(Belgium) AC Motorsport	Audi RS 3 LMS TCR	188	(France) Michael Blanchemain (France) Christophe Hamon (Sweden) Hannes Morin (France) Stéphane Perrin

== Results ==
=== Practice ===
Fastest in class in bold.

Pos	Class	No.	Team	Drivers	Car	Time	Laps
1	**GT3-Am**	**84**	(Germany) **HTP Winward Motorsport**	**(Netherlands) Indy Dontje** **(United Kingdom) Philip Ellis** **(United States) Bryce Ward** **(United States) Russell Ward**	**Mercedes-AMG GT3 (2019)**	**1:45.137**	**49**
2	**GT3-Am**	**92**	**(Germany) Herberth Motorsport**	**(Germany) Jürgen Häring** **(Germany) Michael Joos** **(Greece) Taki Konstantinou** **(Germany) Tim Müller** **(Germany) Marco Seefried**	**Porsche 911 GT3 R (2019)**	**1:45.192**	**50**
3	GT3-Pro	91	(Germany) Herberth Motorsport	(Germany) Ralf Bohn (Germany) Alfred Renauer (Germany) Robert Renauer (Switzerland) Daniel Allemann	Porsche 911 GT3 R (2019)	1:45.546	48
4	**991**	**921**	(Belgium) **Mühlner Motorsport**	**(Netherlands) Jeroen Bleekemolen** **(Belgium) Tom Cloet** **(Germany) Moritz Kranz** **(Portugal) José Carlos Gomes Castro Vieira**	**Porsche 991 GT3 II Cup**	**1:50.589**	**43**
5	**GT4**	**412**	(Portugal) **Parkalgar Racing Team**	**(Portugal) André Antunes** **(Netherlands) Fred Blok** **(Portugal) Jose Monroy** **(Brazil) Joaquim Penteado** **(Portugal) Alvaro Ramos**	**Mercedes-AMG GT4**	**1:54.455**	**40**
6	GT4	401	(Germany) PROsport Performance AMR	(Belgium) Rodrigue Gillion (Belgium) Tom Heeren (Austria) Constantin Schöll (Belgium) Nico Verdonck	Aston Martin Vantage AMR GT4	1:55.298	32
7	**Cayman**	**421**	(Belgium) **Mühlner Motorsport**	(Luxembourg) **Daniel Bohr** (Germany) **Moritz Kranz** (Germany) **Thorsten Jung** (Germany) **Axel Sartingen** (Germany) **Daniel Schwerfeld**	**Porsche 718 Cayman GT4 Clubsport (982)**	**1:55.714**	**41**
8	991	978	(Belgium) Speed Lover	(United States) Dominique Bastien (Belgium) Olivier Dons (France) Eric Mouez (United Kingdom) Gavin Pickering	Porsche 991 GT3 II Cup	1:56.023	32
9	**TCR**	**112**	(Switzerland) **Autorama Motorsport by Wolf-Power Racing**	(Switzerland) **Miklas Born** (Finland) **Antti Buri** (Italy) **Roberto Ferri** (Finland) **Kari-Pekka Laaksonen** (Switzerland) **Yannick Mettler**	**Volkswagen Golf GTI TCR**	**1:56.317**	**41**
10	TCR	1	(Switzerland) Autorama Motorsport by Wolf-Power Racing	(Switzerland) Christopher Lenz (Switzerland) Yannick Mettler (Switzerland) Jérome Ogay (Switzerland) Jasmin Preisig (Switzerland) Stefan Tanner	Volkswagen Golf GTI TCR	1:57.437	43
11	TCR	117	(Belgium) Comtoyou Team Audi Sport	(France) Nathanaël Berthon (Belgium) Nicolas Baert (Netherlands) Tom Coronel	Audi RS 3 LMS TCR	1:57.761	44
12	TCR	101	(Netherlands) Red Camel-Jordans.nl	(Netherlands) Ivo Breukers (Netherlands) Luc Breukers (Netherlands) Ric Breukers	CUPRA León TCR	1:57.889	30
13	TCR	188	(Belgium) AC Motorsport	(France) Michael Blanchemain (France) Christophe Hamon (Sweden) Hannes Morin (France) Stéphane Perrin	Audi RS 3 LMS TCR	1:58.273	48
14	Cayman	408	(Portugal) Veloso Motorsport	(Portugal) José Costa (Portugal) Pedro Marreiros (France) Jean-Roch Piat (Portugal) Paulo Pinheiro (Portugal) Mariano Pires	Porsche Cayman GT4 Clubsport (981)	1:59.564	6
15	TCR	124	(France) Code Racing Development	(France) Philippe Baffoun (France) Thierry Boyer (France) Thierry Chkondali (France) Bruno Derossi (France) Quentin Giordano	Volkswagen Golf GTI TCR	1:59.608	41

=== Qualifying ===
==== GT ====
Class pole position in bold.

Pos	Class	No.	Team	Drivers	Car	Time	Laps
1	**GT3-Am**	**84**	(Germany) **HTP Winward Motorsport**	(Netherlands) **Indy Dontje** (United Kingdom) **Philip Ellis** (United States) **Bryce Ward** (United States) **Russell Ward**	**Mercedes-AMG GT3 (2019)**	**1:43.848**	**13**
2	GT3-Am	92	(Germany) Herberth Motorsport	(Germany) Jürgen Häring (Germany) Michael Joos (Greece) Taki Konstantinou (Germany) Tim Müller (Germany) Marco Seefried	Porsche 911 GT3 R (2019)	1:44.130	20'
3	**GT3-Pro**	**91**	**(Germany) Herberth Motorsport**	**(Germany) Ralf Bohn** **(Germany) Alfred Renauer** **(Germany) Robert Renauer** **(Switzerland) Daniel Allemann**	**Porsche 911 GT3 R (2019)**	**1:44.650**	**17**
4	**991**	**921**	(Belgium) **Mühlner Motorsport**	(Netherlands) **Jeroen Bleekemolen** (Belgium) **Tom Cloet** (Germany) **Moritz Kranz** (Portugal) **José Carlos Gomes Castro Vieira**	**Porsche 991 GT3 II Cup**	**1:49.312**	**9**
5	991	978	(Belgium) Speed Lover	(United States) Dominique Bastien (Belgium) Olivier Dons (France) Eric Mouez (United Kingdom) Gavin Pickering	Porsche 991 GT3 II Cup	1:50.739	13
6	**GT4**	**401**	(Germany) **PROsport Performance AMR**	**(Belgium) Rodrigue Gillion** **(Belgium) Tom Heeren** **(Austria) Constantin Schöll** **(Belgium) Nico Verdonck**	**Aston Martin Vantage AMR GT4**	**1:53.737**	**9**
7	GT4	412	(Portugal) Parkalgar Racing Team	(Portugal) André Antunes (Netherlands) Fred Blok (Portugal) Jose Monroy (Brazil) Joaquim Penteado (Portugal) Alvaro Ramos	Mercedes-AMG GT4	1:54.076	9
8	**Cayman**	**421**	(Belgium) **Mühlner Motorsport**	**(Luxembourg) Daniel Bohr** **(Germany) Moritz Kranz** **(Germany) Thorsten Jung** **(Germany) Axel Sartingen** **(Germany) Daniel Schwerfeld**	**Porsche 718 Cayman GT4 Clubsport (982)**	**1:54.857**	**9**
9	Cayman	408	(Portugal) Veloso Motorsport	(Portugal) José Costa (Portugal) Pedro Marreiros (France) Jean-Roch Piat (Portugal) Paulo Pinheiro (Portugal) Mariano Pires	Porsche Cayman GT4 Clubsport (981)	1:59.270	17

==== TCE ====
Class pole position in bold.

Pos	Class	No.	Team	Drivers	Car	Time	Laps
1	**TCR**	**101**	(Netherlands) **Red Camel-Jordans.nl**	**(Netherlands) Ivo Breukers** **(Netherlands) Luc Breukers** **(Netherlands) Ric Breukers**	**CUPRA León TCR**	**1:55.069**	**12**
2	TCR	117	(Belgium) Comtoyou Team Audi Sport	(France) Nathanaël Berthon (Belgium) Nicolas Baert (Netherlands) Tom Coronel	Audi RS 3 LMS TCR	1:55.209	16
3	TCR	1	(Switzerland) Autorama Motorsport by Wolf-Power Racing	(Switzerland) Christopher Lenz (Switzerland) Yannick Mettler (Switzerland) Jérome Ogay (Switzerland) Jasmin Preisig (Switzerland) Stefan Tanner	Volkswagen Golf GTI TCR	1:55.323	13
4	TCR	112	(Switzerland) Autorama Motorsport by Wolf-Power Racing	(Switzerland) Miklas Born (Finland) Antti Buri (Italy) Roberto Ferri (Finland) Kari-Pekka Laaksonen (Switzerland) Yannick Mettler	Volkswagen Golf GTI TCR	1:55.837	19
5	TCR	124	(France) Code Racing Development	(France) Philippe Baffoun (France) Thierry Boyer (France) Thierry Chkondali (France) Bruno Derossi (France) Quentin Giordano	Volkswagen Golf GTI TCR	1:55.979	15
6	TCR	188	(Belgium) AC Motorsport	(France) Michael Blanchemain (France) Christophe Hamon (Sweden) Hannes Morin (France) Stéphane Perrin	Audi RS 3 LMS TCR	1:56.518	19

=== Night Practice ===
Class pole position in bold.

Pos	Class	No.	Team	Drivers	Car	Time	Laps
1	**GT3-Am**	**92**	(Germany) **Herberth Motorsport**	**(Germany) Jürgen Häring** **(Germany) Michael Joos** **(Greece) Taki Konstantinou** **(Germany) Tim Müller** **(Germany) Marco Seefried**	**Porsche 911 GT3 R (2019)**	**1:44.742**	**32**
2	**GT3-Pro**	**91**	**(Germany) Herberth Motorsport**	**(Germany) Ralf Bohn** **(Germany) Alfred Renauer** **(Germany) Robert Renauer** **(Switzerland) Daniel Allemann**	**Porsche 911 GT3 R (2019)**	**1:44.852**	**27**
3	GT3-Am	84	(Germany) HTP Winward Motorsport	(Netherlands) Indy Dontje (United Kingdom) Philip Ellis (United States) Bryce Ward (United States) Russell Ward	Mercedes-AMG GT3 (2019)	1:46.390	34
4	**991**	**921**	(Belgium) **Mühlner Motorsport**	**(Netherlands) Jeroen Bleekemolen** **(Belgium) Tom Cloet** **(Germany) Moritz Kranz** **(Portugal) José Carlos Gomes Castro Vieira**	**Porsche 991 GT3 II Cup**	**1:51.968**	**23**
5	991	978	(Belgium) Speed Lover	(United States) Dominique Bastien (Belgium) Olivier Dons (France) Eric Mouez (United Kingdom) Gavin Pickering	Porsche 991 GT3 II Cup	1:55.308	21
6	**GT4**	**401**	(Germany) **PROsport Performance AMR**	**(Belgium) Rodrigue Gillion** **(Belgium) Tom Heeren** **(Austria) Constantin Schöll** **(Belgium) Nico Verdonck**	**Aston Martin Vantage AMR GT4**	**1:56.044**	**25**
7	**TCR**	**101**	(Netherlands) **Red Camel-Jordans.nl**	(Netherlands) **Ivo Breukers** (Netherlands) **Luc Breukers** (Netherlands) **Ric Breukers**	**CUPRA León TCR**	**1:56.447**	**22**
8	TCR	117	(Belgium) Comtoyou Team Audi Sport	(France) Nathanaël Berthon (Belgium) Nicolas Baert (Netherlands) Tom Coronel	Audi RS 3 LMS TCR	1:57.645	25
9	TCR	1	(Switzerland) Autorama Motorsport by Wolf-Power Racing	(Switzerland) Christopher Lenz (Switzerland) Yannick Mettler (Switzerland) Jérome Ogay (Switzerland) Jasmin Preisig (Switzerland) Stefan Tanner	Volkswagen Golf GTI TCR	1:57.842	33
10	**Cayman**	**421**	(Belgium) **Mühlner Motorsport**	**(Luxembourg) Daniel Bohr** **(Germany) Moritz Kranz** **(Germany) Thorsten Jung** **(Germany) Axel Sartingen** **(Germany) Daniel Schwerfeld**	**Porsche 718 Cayman GT4 Clubsport (982)**	**1:58.072**	**24**
11	TCR	188	(Belgium) AC Motorsport	(France) Michael Blanchemain (France) Christophe Hamon (Sweden) Hannes Morin (France) Stéphane Perrin	Audi RS 3 LMS TCR	1:58.234	31
12	TCR	124	(France) Code Racing Development	(France) Philippe Baffoun (France) Thierry Boyer (France) Thierry Chkondali (France) Bruno Derossi (France) Quentin Giordano	Volkswagen Golf GTI TCR	1:58.443	28
13	TCR	112	(Switzerland) Autorama Motorsport by Wolf-Power Racing	(Switzerland) Miklas Born (Finland) Antti Buri (Italy) Roberto Ferri (Finland) Kari-Pekka Laaksonen (Switzerland) Yannick Mettler	Volkswagen Golf GTI TCR	1:58.642	29
14	Cayman	408	(Portugal) Veloso Motorsport	(Portugal) José Costa (Portugal) Pedro Marreiros (France) Jean-Roch Piat (Portugal) Paulo Pinheiro (Portugal) Mariano Pires	Porsche Cayman GT4 Clubsport (981)	1:58.785	26
15	GT4	412	(Portugal) Parkalgar Racing Team	(Portugal) André Antunes (Netherlands) Fred Blok (Portugal) Jose Monroy (Brazil) Joaquim Penteado (Portugal) Alvaro Ramos	Mercedes-AMG GT4	2:01.097	24

=== Race ===
Class winner in bold.

Pos	Class	No.	Team	Drivers	Car	Time/Reason	Laps
1	**GT3-Am**	**92**	**(Germany) Herberth Motorsport**	**(Germany) Jürgen Häring** **(Germany) Michael Joos** **(Greece) Taki Konstantinou** **(Germany) Tim Müller** **(Germany) Marco Seefried**	**Porsche 911 GT3 R (2019)**	**24:01:23.179**	**731**
2	**GT3-Pro**	**91**	**(Germany) Herberth Motorsport**	**(Germany) Ralf Bohn** **(Germany) Alfred Renauer** **(Germany) Robert Renauer** **(Switzerland) Daniel Allemann**	**Porsche 911 GT3 R (2019)**	**+26 laps**	**705**
3	**991**	**921**	(Belgium) **Mühlner Motorsport**	**(Netherlands) Jeroen Bleekemolen** **(Belgium) Tom Cloet** **(Germany) Moritz Kranz** **(Portugal) José Carlos Gomes Castro Vieira**	**Porsche 991 GT3 II Cup**	**+42 Laps**	**689**
4	**TCR**	**112**	(Switzerland) **Autorama Motorsport by Wolf-Power Racing**	**(Switzerland) Miklas Born** **(Finland) Antti Buri** **(Italy) Roberto Ferri** **(Finland) Kari-Pekka Laaksonen** **(Switzerland) Yannick Mettler**	**Volkswagen Golf GTI TCR**	**+68 Laps**	**663**
5	TCR	117	(Belgium) Comtoyou Team Audi Sport	(France) Nathanaël Berthon (Belgium) Nicolas Baert (Netherlands) Tom Coronel	Audi RS 3 LMS TCR	+69 Laps	662
6	TCR	188	(Belgium) AC Motorsport	(France) Michael Blanchemain (France) Christophe Hamon (Sweden) Hannes Morin (France) Stéphane Perrin	Audi RS 3 LMS TCR	+88 Laps	643
7	**Cayman**	**421**	(Belgium) **Mühlner Motorsport**	**(Luxembourg) Daniel Bohr** **(Germany) Moritz Kranz** **(Germany) Thorsten Jung** **(Germany) Axel Sartingen** **(Germany) Daniel Schwerfeld**	**Porsche 718 Cayman GT4 Clubsport (982)**	**+91 Laps**	**640**
8	TCR	124	(France) Code Racing Development	(France) Philippe Baffoun (France) Thierry Boyer (France) Thierry Chkondali (France) Bruno Derossi (France) Quentin Giordano	Volkswagen Golf GTI TCR	+115 Laps	616
9 DNF	991	978	(Belgium) Speed Lover	(United States) Dominique Bastien (Belgium) Olivier Dons (France) Eric Mouez (United Kingdom) Gavin Pickering	Porsche 991 GT3 II Cup	Retired	554
10 DNF	TCR	1	(Switzerland) Autorama Motorsport by Wolf-Power Racing	(Switzerland) Christopher Lenz (Switzerland) Yannick Mettler (Switzerland) Jérome Ogay (Switzerland) Jasmin Preisig (Switzerland) Stefan Tanner	Volkswagen Golf GTI TCR	Electrics	536
11	Cayman	408	(Portugal) Veloso Motorsport	(Portugal) José Costa (Portugal) Pedro Marreiros (France) Jean-Roch Piat (Portugal) Paulo Pinheiro (Portugal) Mariano Pires	Porsche Cayman GT4 Clubsport (981)	+216 Laps	515
12 DNF	TCR	101	(Netherlands) Red Camel-Jordans.nl	(Netherlands) Ivo Breukers (Netherlands) Luc Breukers (Netherlands) Ric Breukers	CUPRA León TCR	Engine	497
13 DNF	**GT4**	**401**	(Germany) **PROsport Performance AMR**	**(Belgium) Rodrigue Gillion** **(Belgium) Tom Heeren** **(Austria) Constantin Schöll** **(Belgium) Nico Verdonck**	**Aston Martin Vantage AMR GT4**	**Brakes/Suspension**	**222**
DNF	GT4	412	(Portugal) Parkalgar Racing Team	(Portugal) André Antunes (Netherlands) Fred Blok (Portugal) Jose Monroy (Brazil) Joaquim Penteado (Portugal) Alvaro Ramos	Mercedes-AMG GT4	Overheating	133
DNF	GT3-Am	84	(Germany) HTP Winward Motorsport	(Netherlands) Indy Dontje (United Kingdom) Philip Ellis (United States) Bryce Ward (United States) Russell Ward	Mercedes-AMG GT3 (2019)	Crash	77

24H Series
Previous race: Dubai 24 Hour	2020 season	Next race: 12 Hours of Monza
