= Wolf Racing Cars =

Italian racing car constructor

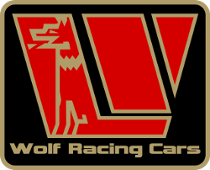
- Industry: Automotive
- Predecessor: Walter Wolf Racing
- Founded: 2009
- Headquarters: Gardone Val Trompia, Italy
- Key people: Giovanni Bellarosa; Ivan Bellarosa
- Products: Racing cars

Wolf Racing Cars is an Italian racing car builder and brand based in the Province of Brescia, founded in 2009 after Avelon Formula purchased the rights of Walter Wolf Racing.

== History ==
After purchasing the Walter Wolf Racing trademarks, in 2010, Wolf Racing Cars made their debut in the Italian Prototype Championship with the driver Ivan Bellarosa. In 2011, Wolf raced in Europe at the Speed Euro Series and in the V de V Proto Endurance Series. The Wolf GB08 using a Honda K20A engine unit won the Speed Euro Series Championship, with Ivan Bellarosa taking 6 wins. Ivan Bellarosa also won the Speed Euro Series again in 2012, as Wolf Racing Cars started to take part in endurance races at the 24 Hours of Zolder and in the 12 Hours of Abu Dhabi.

In 2013, Wolf Racing Cars won the Portuguese CISP and the Austro-German SCC, Division 2. As a result, the Wolf GB08 F1 was created and obtained the FIA Formula 1 2005 homologation. At the end of the year, Wolf Racing Cars announced a sporting program in the United Sports Car Racing Series for season 2014. The car was powered by a BMW engine. In 2015, the company won the Belgian Belcar, Endurance Champions Cup, and the 6 Hours of Rome at the Autodromo di Vallelunga.

On May 29, 2016, at Autodromo Enzo e Dino Ferrari in Imola, Wolf GB08 won a competition. During the year, the Wolf's two-seater repeated its victory in the Endurance Champions Cup, while in the United States, John Morris and Ron Eckardt obtained several successes in the series of Spring Mountain Racing (SMMR). In 2017, the two-seater sports car Wolf GB08 Tornado debuted in Australia in March. The Tornado was in several endurance competitions, including the 3 Hours of Imola. At the 6 hours of Rome, the Wolf GB08 Tornado got Wolf Racing Cars their 100th pole position.

== Cars ==
Year	Car	Class
2010	Wolf GB08	Group CN
2011	Wolf GB08S	Group E2 B
2012	Wolf GB08 Spring	Group CN
2013	Wolf GB08 F1	E2 SS
2013	Wolf GB08 MJ	E2 SS
2013	Wolf GB08 SM Turbo	E2 SS
2015	Wolf GB08 SM	E2 SS
2017	Wolf GB08 Tornado	CN E2 SC
2018	Wolf GB08 Thunder	ES22
