= 2020 Nürburgring Langstrecken-Serie =

Motorsport season

The 2020 Nürburgring Langstrecken-Serie was the 43rd season of the German endurance series (formerly VLN) run at the Nürburgring Nordschleife, and first run as the Nürburgring Langstrecken-Serie (NLS). The season began on 27 June and ended prematurely on 29 August.

The drivers championship was won by Philipp Leisen, Christopher Rink and Danny Brink, driving a BMW 325i for Adrenalin Motorsport.

== Calendar ==
Rnd.	Race	Length	Circuit	Date
1	51. Adenauer ADAC Rundstrecken-Trophy	4 hours	(Germany) Nürburgring Nordschleife	June 27
2	60. ADAC Reinoldus-Langstreckenrennen	4 hours	(Germany) Nürburgring Nordschleife	July 11
3	52. ADAC Barbarossapreis	4 hours	(Germany) Nürburgring Nordschleife	July 12
4	43. RCM DMV Grenzlandrennen	4 hours	(Germany) Nürburgring Nordschleife	August 1
5	ROWE 6 Stunden ADAC Ruhr-Pokal-Rennen	6 hours	(Germany) Nürburgring Nordschleife	August 29
Cancelled Races
6	45. DMV Münsterlandpokal	4 hours	(Germany) Nürburgring Nordschleife	October 24
7	45. DMV 4-Stunden-Rennen	4 hours	(Germany) Nürburgring Nordschleife	November 7
8	62. ADAC ACAS Cup	4 hours	(Germany) Nürburgring Nordschleife	November 21

== Classes ==
Entries are split into multiple different classes. Current classes are:

Icon	Class
NLS specials
SP2T	Purpose-built racecars with a turbocharged-engine capacity between 1400 and 1749 cc and a turbocharger.
SP3	Purpose-built racecars with an engine capacity between 1750 and 1999 cc.
SP3T	Purpose-built racecars with a turbocharged-engine capacity between 1750 and 1999 cc and a turbocharger.
SP4	Purpose-built racecars with an engine capacity between 2000 and 2499 cc.
SP4T	Purpose-built racecars with a turbocharged-engine capacity between 2000 and 2599 cc and a turbocharger.
SP6	Purpose-built racecars with an engine capacity between 3000 and 3499 cc.
SP7	Purpose-built racecars with an engine capacity between 3500 and 3999 cc.
SP8	Purpose-built racecars with an engine capacity over 4000 cc.
SP8T	Purpose-built racecars with a turbocharged-engine capacity between 2600 and 4000 cc.
SP9	For FIA-homologated Group GT3 cars. GT3 sub-classes based on driver ranking system maintained by the FIA.
SP9 Pro, SP9 Pro-Am & SP9 Am	For FIA-homologated Group GT3 cars. GT3 sub-classes based on driver ranking system maintained by the FIA.
SP10	For FIA and SRO-homologated Group GT4 cars.
SP-Pro	Prototype racecars with an engine capacity over 3000 cc.
SPX	'Special vehicles' which do not fit into any other class.
AT(-G)	Vehicles using alternative fuel sources (e.g. electric, LPG, hydrogen, etc.)
TCR touring cars
TCR	FIA-homologated TCR Touring Cars. TCR sub-classes based on driver ranking system.
TCR Pro & TCR Am	FIA-homologated TCR Touring Cars. TCR sub-classes based on driver ranking system.
NLS production cars
V2	Production cars with an engine capacity between 1600 and 1799 cc.
V4	Production cars with an engine capacity between 2000 and 2499 cc.
V5	Production cars with an engine capacity between 2500 and 2999 cc.
V6	Production cars with an engine capacity over 3500 cc.
VT2	Production cars with an engine capacity between 2000 and 2999 cc and a turbocharger.
VT3	Production cars with an engine capacity over 3000cc and a turbocharger.
Cup Class cars Cup classes are for single make identical or near identical specification cars
Cup 2	Porsche 911 GT3 Cup cars.
Cup 3	Porsche Cayman GT4 Trophy cars.
Cup 5	BMW M240i Racing Cup cars.
Cup X	KTM X-Bow Cup cars.
M2 CS	BMW M2 CS cars.
OPC	Opel Astra OPC cars.
Gruppe H historic cars
H2	Pre-2008 production cars and purpose-built racecars with an engine capacity up to 1999 cc.
H4	Pre-2008 production cars and purpose-built racecars with an engine capacity between 2000 and 6250 cc.

== Entry Lists ==
=== SP9 / SPX ===
Team	Car	No.	Drivers	Class	Events
(Germany) Mercedes-AMG Team GetSpeed	Mercedes-AMG GT3 Evo	2	(Germany) Maximilian Buhk	P	1–2, 5
(Germany) Mercedes-AMG Team GetSpeed	Mercedes-AMG GT3 Evo	2	(Germany) Fabian Schiller	P	1–2, 5
(Germany) Mercedes-AMG Team GetSpeed	Mercedes-AMG GT3 Evo	2	(Italy) Raffaele Marciello	P	1, 3, 5
(Germany) Mercedes-AMG Team GetSpeed	Mercedes-AMG GT3 Evo	2	(Germany) Maximilian Götz	P	3, 5
(Germany) Mercedes-AMG Team GetSpeed	Mercedes-AMG GT3 Evo	8	(France) Emmanuel Collard	PA	1, 3
(Germany) Mercedes-AMG Team GetSpeed	Mercedes-AMG GT3 Evo	8	(France) François Perrodo	PA	1, 3
(Germany) Mercedes-AMG Team GetSpeed	Mercedes-AMG GT3 Evo	8	(France) Matthieu Vaxivière	PA	1
(Germany) Mercedes-AMG Team GetSpeed	Mercedes-AMG GT3 Evo	8	(Germany) Christer Jöns	P	2, 5
(Germany) Mercedes-AMG Team GetSpeed	Mercedes-AMG GT3 Evo	8	(France) Matthieu Vaxivière	P	2, 5
(Germany) Mercedes-AMG Team GetSpeed	Mercedes-AMG GT3 Evo	8	(France) Emmanuel Collard	P	5
(Germany) Mercedes-AMG Team GetSpeed	Mercedes-AMG GT3 Evo	8	(France) François Perrodo	P	5
(Germany) Mercedes-AMG Team GetSpeed	Mercedes-AMG GT3 Evo	23	(United States) Janine Hill	Am	1–2, 4–5
(Germany) Mercedes-AMG Team GetSpeed	Mercedes-AMG GT3 Evo	23	(United States) John Shoffner	Am	1–2, 4
(Germany) Mercedes-AMG Team GetSpeed	Mercedes-AMG GT3 Evo	23	(Germany) Adam Osieka	Am	1–2
(Germany) Mercedes-AMG Team GetSpeed	Mercedes-AMG GT3 Evo	23	(Germany) Fabian Schiller	Am	4
(Germany) Mercedes-AMG Team GetSpeed	Mercedes-AMG GT3 Evo	23	(Netherlands) Jules Szymkowiak	Am	5
(Germany) Falken Motorsports	Porsche 911 GT3 R	3	(Germany) Christian Engelhart	P	1, 3, 5
(Germany) Falken Motorsports	Porsche 911 GT3 R	3	(Norway) Dennis Olsen	P	1
(Germany) Falken Motorsports	Porsche 911 GT3 R	3	(Austria) Thomas Preining	P	2–3, 5
(Germany) Falken Motorsports	Porsche 911 GT3 R	3	(Germany) Dirk Werner	P	2, 5
(Germany) Falken Motorsports	Porsche 911 GT3 R	3	(Germany) Sven Müller	P	5
(Germany) Falken Motorsports	Porsche 911 GT3 R	4	(United Kingdom) Peter Dumbreck	P	2–3, 5
(Germany) Falken Motorsports	Porsche 911 GT3 R	4	(Austria) Martin Ragginger	P	2, 5
(Germany) Falken Motorsports	Porsche 911 GT3 R	4	(Italy) Matteo Cairoli	P	3, 5
(Germany) Falken Motorsports	Porsche 911 GT3 R	4	(Austria) Klaus Bachler	P	5
(Germany) Phoenix Racing	Audi R8 LMS Evo	5	(Germany) Vincent Kolb	P	All
(Germany) Phoenix Racing	Audi R8 LMS Evo	5	(Germany) Frank Stippler	P	1–3, 5
(Germany) Phoenix Racing	Audi R8 LMS Evo	5	(United Kingdom) Richard Westbrook	P	2–5
(Germany) Phoenix Racing	Audi R8 LMS Evo	5	(Germany) Mike Rockenfeller	P	5
(Germany) Phoenix Racing	Audi R8 LMS Evo	15	(Germany) Kim-Luis Schramm	P	1–3, 5
(Germany) Phoenix Racing	Audi R8 LMS Evo	15	(Italy) Michele Beretta	P	1–3
(Germany) Phoenix Racing	Audi R8 LMS Evo	15	(Germany) Mike Rockenfeller	P	2–3
(Germany) Phoenix Racing	Audi R8 LMS Evo	15	(France) Jules Gounon	P	5
(Germany) Phoenix Racing	Audi R8 LMS Evo	15	(United Kingdom) Jamie Green	P	5
(Germany) Mercedes-AMG Team HRT	Mercedes-AMG GT3 Evo	6	(Germany) Patrick Assenheimer	P	All
(Germany) Mercedes-AMG Team HRT	Mercedes-AMG GT3 Evo	6	(Germany) Maro Engel	P	1, 5
(Germany) Mercedes-AMG Team HRT	Mercedes-AMG GT3 Evo	6	(Austria) Dominik Baumann	P	2–5
(Germany) Mercedes-AMG Team HRT	Mercedes-AMG GT3 Evo	6	(Germany) Dirk Müller	P	2–5
(Germany) Mercedes-AMG Team HRT	Mercedes-AMG GT3 Evo	16	(United Kingdom) Adam Christodoulou	P	2–3, 5
(Germany) Mercedes-AMG Team HRT	Mercedes-AMG GT3 Evo	16	(Germany) Maro Engel	P	2–3, 5
(Germany) Mercedes-AMG Team HRT	Mercedes-AMG GT3 Evo	16	(Germany) Manuel Metzger	P	2–3, 5
(Germany) Mercedes-AMG Team HRT	Mercedes-AMG GT3 Evo	16	(Germany) Luca Stolz	P	2–3, 5
(Germany) Mercedes-AMG Team HRT	Mercedes-AMG GT3 Evo	17	(Germany) Hubert Haupt	P	2–3, 5
(Germany) Mercedes-AMG Team HRT	Mercedes-AMG GT3 Evo	17	(Netherlands) Yelmer Buurman	P	2–3
(Germany) Mercedes-AMG Team HRT	Mercedes-AMG GT3 Evo	17	(Italy) Gabriele Piana	P	2, 5
(Germany) Mercedes-AMG Team HRT	Mercedes-AMG GT3 Evo	17	(Germany) Nico Bastian	P	3, 5
(Germany) Mercedes-AMG Team HRT	Mercedes-AMG GT3 Evo	17	(United Kingdom) Philip Ellis	P	5
(Austria) Konrad Motorsport	Lamborghini Huracán GT3 Evo	7	(Zimbabwe) Axcil Jefferies	P	2–5
(Austria) Konrad Motorsport	Lamborghini Huracán GT3 Evo	7	(Germany) Michele Di Martino	P	2–5
(Austria) Konrad Motorsport	Lamborghini Huracán GT3 Evo	7	(Italy) Marco Mapelli	P	2–3
(Germany) EFP Car Collection by TECE	Audi R8 LMS Evo	11	(Germany) Elia Erhart	P	1, 5
(Germany) EFP Car Collection by TECE	Audi R8 LMS Evo	11	(Germany) Pierre Kaffer	P	1, 5
(Germany) EFP Car Collection by TECE	Audi R8 LMS Evo	11	(Austria) Simon Reicher	P	1, 5
(Germany) EFP Car Collection by TECE	Audi R8 LMS Evo	11	(Germany) Jan-Erik Slooten	P	1, 5
(Germany) EFP Car Collection by TECE	Audi R8 LMS Evo	11	(Germany) Elia Erhart	Am	2
(Germany) EFP Car Collection by TECE	Audi R8 LMS Evo	11	(Austria) Simon Reicher	Am	2
(Germany) EFP Car Collection by TECE	Audi R8 LMS Evo	11	(Germany) Klaus Koch	Am	2
(Germany) Car Collection Motorsport	Audi R8 LMS Evo	32	(Netherlands) Robin Frijns	P	1
(Germany) Car Collection Motorsport	Audi R8 LMS Evo	32	(Germany) René Rast	P	1
(Germany) Car Collection Motorsport	Audi R8 LMS Evo	32	(Switzerland) Nico Müller	P	1
(Germany) Car Collection Motorsport	Audi R8 LMS Evo	44	(Netherlands) Milan Dontje	P	1, 4–5
(Germany) Car Collection Motorsport	Audi R8 LMS Evo	44	(Germany) Mike David Ortmann	P	1, 4–5
(Germany) Car Collection Motorsport	Audi R8 LMS Evo	44	(Switzerland) Patric Niederhauser	P	1, 5
(Germany) Car Collection Motorsport	Audi R8 LMS Evo	44	(Germany) Markus Winkelhock	P	4
(Germany) RaceIng - powered by HFG	Audi R8 LMS Evo	14	(Germany) Christian Bollrath	Am	2–3, 5
(Germany) RaceIng - powered by HFG	Audi R8 LMS Evo	14	(Germany) Bernhard Henzel	Am	2–3, 5
(Germany) RaceIng - powered by HFG	Audi R8 LMS Evo	14	(Switzerland) Rahel Frey	Am	2–3
(Germany) RaceIng - powered by HFG	Audi R8 LMS Evo	14	(Germany) Stefan Aust	Am	5
(Hong Kong) KCMG	Porsche 911 GT3 R	18	(France) Romain Dumas	P	2–5
(Hong Kong) KCMG	Porsche 911 GT3 R	18	(Norway) Dennis Olsen	P	2–5
(Hong Kong) KCMG	Porsche 911 GT3 R	18	(France) Patrick Pilet	P	2–3, 5
(Hong Kong) KCMG	Porsche 911 GT3 R	18	(Austria) Richard Lietz	P	3, 5
(Hong Kong) KCMG	Porsche 911 GT3 R	18	(Switzerland) Alexandre Imperatori	P	4
(Hong Kong) KCMG	Porsche 911 GT3 R	19	(Australia) Josh Burdon	P	2–5
(Hong Kong) KCMG	Porsche 911 GT3 R	19	(Italy) Edoardo Liberati	P	2–5
(Hong Kong) KCMG	Porsche 911 GT3 R	19	(Switzerland) Alexandre Imperatori	P	2–3, 5
(Hong Kong) KCMG	Porsche 911 GT3 R	19	(Norway) Dennis Olsen	P	4
(Germany) Audi Sport Team	Audi R8 LMS Evo	20	(Belgium) Frédéric Vervisch	P	4–5
(Germany) Audi Sport Team	Audi R8 LMS Evo	20	(Italy) Mattia Drudi	P	4
(Germany) Audi Sport Team	Audi R8 LMS Evo	20	(Germany) Markus Winkelhock	P	4
(Germany) Audi Sport Team	Audi R8 LMS Evo	20	(Belgium) Dries Vanthoor	P	5
(Germany) Audi Sport Team	Audi R8 LMS Evo	20	(Switzerland) Nico Müller	P	5
(Germany) Audi Sport Team	Audi R8 LMS Evo	20	(Germany) Frank Stippler	P	5
(Germany) Audi Sport Team	Audi R8 LMS Evo	29	(Italy) Mattia Drudi	P	2–3, 5
(Germany) Audi Sport Team	Audi R8 LMS Evo	29	(Belgium) Dries Vanthoor	P	2
(Germany) Audi Sport Team	Audi R8 LMS Evo	29	(South Africa) Kelvin van der Linde	P	3, 5
(Germany) Audi Sport Team	Audi R8 LMS Evo	29	(Germany) Christopher Mies	P	3, 5
(Germany) Audi Sport Team	Audi R8 LMS Evo	32	(Italy) Mirko Bortolotti	P	2–3, 5
(Germany) Audi Sport Team	Audi R8 LMS Evo	32	(Germany) Christopher Haase	P	2–3, 5
(Germany) Audi Sport Team	Audi R8 LMS Evo	32	(Germany) Markus Winkelhock	P	3, 5
(Germany) Audi Sport Team	Audi R8 LMS Evo	32	(Netherlands) Robin Frijns	P	5
(Germany) Huber Motorsport	Porsche 911 GT3 R	25	(Germany) Marco Holzer	PA	All
(Germany) Huber Motorsport	Porsche 911 GT3 R	25	(Germany) Patrick Kolb	PA	All
(Germany) Huber Motorsport	Porsche 911 GT3 R	25	(Italy) Lorenzo Rocco di Torrepadula	PA	All
(Switzerland) Octane126	Ferrari 488 GT3	26	(Germany) Björn Grossmann	P	1–3, 5
(Switzerland) Octane126	Ferrari 488 GT3	26	(Germany) Luca Ludwig	P	1–3, 5
(Switzerland) Octane126	Ferrari 488 GT3	26	(Switzerland) Jonathan Hirschi	P	1–3
(Switzerland) Octane126	Ferrari 488 GT3	26	(Switzerland) Simon Trummer	P	1–3
(Germany) Frikadelli Racing Team	Porsche 911 GT3 R	30	(Germany) Klaus Abbelen	PA	1–3, 5
(Germany) Frikadelli Racing Team	Porsche 911 GT3 R	30	(Germany) Lance David Arnold	PA	1–3, 5
(Germany) Frikadelli Racing Team	Porsche 911 GT3 R	30	(Switzerland) Alex Müller	PA	1–2, 5
(Germany) Frikadelli Racing Team	Porsche 911 GT3 R	30	(Germany) Felipe Fernández Laser	PA	3
(Germany) Frikadelli Racing Team	Porsche 911 GT3 R	30	(Netherlands) Jeroen Bleekemolen	PA	4
(Germany) Frikadelli Racing Team	Porsche 911 GT3 R	30	(Belgium) Maxime Martin	PA	4
(Germany) Frikadelli Racing Team	Porsche 911 GT3 R	31	(Denmark) Michael Christensen	P	1–3, 5
(Germany) Frikadelli Racing Team	Porsche 911 GT3 R	31	(France) Kévin Estre	P	1–2, 5
(Germany) Frikadelli Racing Team	Porsche 911 GT3 R	31	(Germany) Felipe Fernández Laser	P	2
(Germany) Frikadelli Racing Team	Porsche 911 GT3 R	31	(Switzerland) Alex Müller	P	3
(Germany) Frikadelli Racing Team	Porsche 911 GT3 R	31	(Netherlands) Jeroen Bleekemolen	P	5
(Germany) Frikadelli Racing Team	Porsche 911 GT3 R	31	(Belgium) Maxime Martin	P	5
(Germany) Walkenhorst Motorsport	BMW M6 GT3	34	(United Kingdom) David Pittard	P	All
(Germany) Walkenhorst Motorsport	BMW M6 GT3	34	(Denmark) Mikkel Jensen	P	1–2, 4
(Germany) Walkenhorst Motorsport	BMW M6 GT3	34	(Norway) Christian Krognes	P	2–4
(Germany) Walkenhorst Motorsport	BMW M6 GT3	34	(South Africa) Jordan Pepper	P	5
(Germany) Walkenhorst Motorsport	BMW M6 GT3	36	(Germany) Henry Walkenhorst	P	All
(Germany) Walkenhorst Motorsport	BMW M6 GT3	36	(Germany) Andreas Ziegler	P	All
(Germany) Walkenhorst Motorsport	BMW M6 GT3	36	(Germany) Friedrich von Bohlen und Hallbach	P	1–3, 5
(Germany) Walkenhorst Motorsport	BMW M6 GT3	36	(Germany) Ralf Oeverhaus	P	4
(Germany) Walkenhorst Motorsport	BMW M6 GT3	36	(Germany) Mario von Bohlen und Hallbach	P	5
(China) Orange1 FFF Racing Team	Lamborghini Huracán GT3 Evo	37	(Italy) Giacomo Altoè	P	5
(China) Orange1 FFF Racing Team	Lamborghini Huracán GT3 Evo	37	(Italy) Andrea Caldarelli	P	5
(China) Orange1 FFF Racing Team	Lamborghini Huracán GT3 Evo	37	(Italy) Marco Mapelli	P	5
(Germany) Racing One	Ferrari 488 GT3	39	(Germany) Christian Kohlhaas	Am	All
(Germany) Racing One	Ferrari 488 GT3	39	(Switzerland) Nikolaj Rogivue	Am	1–3, 5
(Germany) Racing One	Ferrari 488 GT3	39	(Germany) Stephan Köhler	Am	1–2
(Germany) Racing One	Ferrari 488 GT3	39	(Germany) Jan-Erik Slooten	Am	3
(Germany) Racing One	Ferrari 488 GT3	39	(Germany) Stefan Aust	Am	4
(Germany) Racing One	Ferrari 488 GT3	39	(Netherlands) Jules Szymkowiak	Am	4
(Germany) Racing One	Ferrari 488 GT3	39	(Germany) Mike Jäger	Am	5
(Germany) 10Q Racing Team	Mercedes-AMG GT3	40	(Germany) Sebastian Asch	P	5
(Germany) 10Q Racing Team	Mercedes-AMG GT3	40	(Germany) Kenneth Heyer	P	5
(Germany) 10Q Racing Team	Mercedes-AMG GT3	40	(Germany) Thomas Jäger	P	5
(Germany) 10Q Racing Team	Mercedes-AMG GT3	40	(Spain) Daniel Juncadella	P	5
(Germany) BMW Team Schnitzer	BMW M6 GT3	42	(Germany) Martin Tomczyk	P	2–3, 5
(Germany) BMW Team Schnitzer	BMW M6 GT3	42	(South Africa) Sheldon van der Linde	P	2–3, 5
(Germany) BMW Team Schnitzer	BMW M6 GT3	42	(Brazil) Augusto Farfus	P	2, 5
(Germany) BMW Team Schnitzer	BMW M6 GT3	42	(Germany) Jens Klingmann	P	5
(Netherlands) Team Équipe-Vitesse	Audi R8 LMS Evo	50	(Germany) Rudi Adams	Am	All
(Netherlands) Team Équipe-Vitesse	Audi R8 LMS Evo	50	(Germany) Michael Heimrich	Am	All
(Netherlands) Team Équipe-Vitesse	Audi R8 LMS Evo	50	(Germany) Arno Klasen	Am	All
(United States) Scuderia Cameron Glickenhaus	Scuderia Cameron Glickenhaus SCG 004c	54	(Germany) Felipe Fernández Laser	SPX	5
(United States) Scuderia Cameron Glickenhaus	Scuderia Cameron Glickenhaus SCG 004c	54	(France) Franck Mailleux	SPX	5
(United States) Scuderia Cameron Glickenhaus	Scuderia Cameron Glickenhaus SCG 004c	54	(Germany) Thomas Mutsch	SPX	5
(Germany) ROWE Racing	BMW M6 GT3	98	(United Kingdom) Nick Yelloly	P	2–3
(Germany) ROWE Racing	BMW M6 GT3	98	(United Kingdom) Alexander Sims	P	2
(Germany) ROWE Racing	BMW M6 GT3	98	(Austria) Lucas Auer	P	3, 5
(Germany) ROWE Racing	BMW M6 GT3	98	(Germany) Marco Wittmann	P	5
(Germany) ROWE Racing	BMW M6 GT3	98	(Netherlands) Stef Dusseldorp	P	5
(Germany) ROWE Racing	BMW M6 GT3	99	(Netherlands) Nick Catsburg	P	1, 4–5
(Germany) ROWE Racing	BMW M6 GT3	99	(Austria) Philipp Eng	P	1, 5
(Germany) ROWE Racing	BMW M6 GT3	99	(Netherlands) Stef Dusseldorp	P	4
(Germany) ROWE Racing	BMW M6 GT3	99	(United Kingdom) Alexander Sims	P	5
(Germany) ROWE Racing	BMW M6 GT3	99	(United Kingdom) Nick Yelloly	P	5
(Germany) Manthey Racing	Porsche 911 GT3 R	911	(Germany) Lars Kern	P	1–3, 5
(Germany) Manthey Racing	Porsche 911 GT3 R	911	(France) Julien Andlauer	P	1–3
(Germany) Manthey Racing	Porsche 911 GT3 R	911	(Australia) Matt Campbell	P	1, 3, 5
(Germany) Manthey Racing	Porsche 911 GT3 R	911	(France) Mathieu Jaminet	P	2, 5

Icon	Class
P	Pro Cup
PA	Pro-Am Cup
Am	Am Cup
SPX	SPX

=== SP7 ===
Team	Car	No.	Drivers	Events
	Porsche 991 GT3 Cup	58	(United States) Bill Cameron	2–5
	Porsche 991 GT3 Cup	58	(United States) Jim Cameron	2–3, 5
	Porsche 991 GT3 Cup	58	(Germany) Peter Bonk	4
(Belgium) Mühlner Motorsport	Porsche 991 GT3 Cup	62	(Germany) Marcel Hoppe	All
(Belgium) Mühlner Motorsport	Porsche 991 GT3 Cup	62	(Germany) Moritz Kranz	1–4
(Belgium) Mühlner Motorsport	Porsche 991 GT3 Cup	62	(Germany) Peter Terting	1–3, 5
(Belgium) Mühlner Motorsport	Porsche 991 GT3 Cup	62	(Germany) Jochen Krumbach	4
(Belgium) Mühlner Motorsport	Porsche 991 GT3 Cup	62	(Germany) Michael Rebhan	5
(Belgium) Mühlner Motorsport	Porsche 991 GT3 Cup	62	(Germany) Jörn Schmidt-Staade	5
(Germany) rent2drive-FAMILIA-racing	Porsche 991 GT3 Cup	66	(Germany) Karl Pflanz	All
(Germany) rent2drive-FAMILIA-racing	Porsche 991 GT3 Cup	66	(Germany) Richard Gresek	1–3, 5
(Germany) rent2drive-FAMILIA-racing	Porsche 991 GT3 Cup	66	(Netherlands) Kay van Berlo	1
(Germany) rent2drive-FAMILIA-racing	Porsche 991 GT3 Cup	66	(Germany) Ronja Assmann	2–5
(Germany) rent2drive-FAMILIA-racing	Porsche 991 GT3 Cup	66	(Germany) Philipp Gresek	4
(Germany) rent2drive-FAMILIA-racing	Porsche 991 GT3 Cup	66	(Germany) Bernd Kleeschulte	5
(Germany) clickversicherung.de Team	Porsche 991 GT3 Cup MR	69	(Germany) Robin Chrzanowski	1–3
(Germany) clickversicherung.de Team	Porsche 991 GT3 Cup MR	69	(Germany) Kersten Jodexnis	1–3
(Germany) clickversicherung.de Team	Porsche 991 GT3 Cup MR	69	(Germany) Guido Heinrich	2–3
	Porsche 991 GT3 Cup	79	(Czech Republic) Milan Kodidek	All
	Porsche 991 GT3 Cup	79	(Germany) Bob Wilwert	1, 3–4
	Porsche 991 GT3 Cup	79	(Germany) Marcus Löhnert	2, 5
	Porsche 991 GT3 Cup	79	(Belgium) Kris Cools	3
	Porsche 991 GT3 Cup	79	(Netherlands) Marco van Ramshorst	4
	Porsche 991 GT3 Cup	79	(Germany) Tim Breidenbach	5
(Germany) Huber Motorsport	Porsche 911	80	(Germany) Nico Menzel	All
(Germany) Huber Motorsport	Porsche 911	80	(Germany) Philipp Neuffer	All
(Germany) Huber Motorsport	Porsche 911	80	(Germany) Johannes Stengel	1–4
(Germany) Huber Motorsport	Porsche 911	80	(Germany) Florian Spengler	5
(United States) CP Racing	Porsche 991 GT3 Cup	85	(United States) Charles Espenlaub	4–5
(United States) CP Racing	Porsche 991 GT3 Cup	85	(United States) Shane Lewis	4–5
(United States) CP Racing	Porsche 991 GT3 Cup	85	(United States) Joe Foster	5
(United States) CP Racing	Porsche 991 GT3 Cup	85	(United States) Charles Putman	5
(Belgium) Pit Lane - AMC Sankt Vith	Porsche Cayman	100	(Switzerland) Jacques Castelein	1, 3, 5
(Belgium) Pit Lane - AMC Sankt Vith	Porsche Cayman	100	(Belgium) Kurt Dujardyn	1, 3, 5
(Belgium) Pit Lane - AMC Sankt Vith	Porsche Cayman	100	(Belgium) Olivier Muytjens	1, 3, 5

=== SP8 ===
Team	Car	No.	Drivers	Events
(Germany) Giti Tire Motorsport By WS Racing	Audi R8 LMS GT4 Evo	128	(Denmark) Henrik Bollerslev	All
(Germany) Giti Tire Motorsport By WS Racing	Audi R8 LMS GT4 Evo	128	(Germany) Niklas Kry	All
(Germany) Giti Tire Motorsport By WS Racing	Audi R8 LMS GT4 Evo	128	(Germany) Carrie Schreiner	1–3, 5
(Germany) Giti Tire Motorsport By WS Racing	Audi R8 LMS GT4 Evo	128	(Germany) Guido Wirtz	5
(Germany) Novel Racing with Toyo Tire by Ring Racing	Lexus RC-F	135	(Germany) Alexander Mohr	1–3
(Germany) Novel Racing with Toyo Tire by Ring Racing	Lexus RC-F	135	(Germany) Uwe Kleen	1, 3
(Germany) Novel Racing with Toyo Tire by Ring Racing	Lexus RC-F	135	(Germany) Michael Tischner	1
(Germany) Novel Racing with Toyo Tire by Ring Racing	Lexus RC-F	135	(Germany) Klaus Völker	2–3
(Germany) Novel Racing with Toyo Tire by Ring Racing	Lexus RC-F	135	(Germany) Dominik Farnbacher	2
	Ford Mustang	141	(Germany) Jürgen Gagstatter	2
	Ford Mustang	141	(Germany) Jens Ludmann	2
	Ford Mustang	141	(Germany) Stephan Wölflick	2

=== SP8T ===
Team	Car	No.	Drivers	Events
(Germany) FK Performance Motorsport	BMW M240i Racing	145	(United Kingdom) Dan Harper	1
(Germany) FK Performance Motorsport	BMW M240i Racing	145	(Germany) Max Hesse	1
(Germany) FK Performance Motorsport	BMW M240i Racing	145	(Germany) Neil Verhagen	1
(Germany) Hanger Zero by J.v.O. Autosport	Mercedes-AMG GT4	148	(Germany) Phil Hill	4–5
(Germany) Hanger Zero by J.v.O. Autosport	Mercedes-AMG GT4	148	(Denmark) Kaj Schubert	4–5
(Germany) Hanger Zero by J.v.O. Autosport	Mercedes-AMG GT4	148	(France) Célia Martin	5
(Belgium) Hakan Sari	BMW M4	149	(Belgium) Hakan Sari	2–3. 5
(Belgium) Hakan Sari	BMW M4	149	(Belgium) Recep Sari	2–3, 5
(Belgium) Hakan Sari	BMW M4	149	(Turkey) Ersin Yücesan	2–3
(Germany) Walkenhorst Motorsport	BMW M2 ClubSport Racing	151	(Finland) Sami-Matti Trogen	1
(Germany) Walkenhorst Motorsport	BMW M2 ClubSport Racing	151	(Germany) Mario von Bohlen und Halbach	1
(Germany) Black Falcon Team TEXTAR	Mercedes-AMG GT4	155	(Germany) Stephan Rösler	1–3, 5
(Germany) Black Falcon Team TEXTAR	Mercedes-AMG GT4	155	(Estonia) Tristan Viidas	1–3, 5
(Germany) Black Falcon Team TEXTAR	Mercedes-AMG GT4	155	(Germany) Maik Rosenberg	2
(Germany) Black Falcon Team TEXTAR	Mercedes-AMG GT4	155	(Germany) Marco Müller	3, 5
(Germany) Black Falcon Team TEXTAR	Mercedes-AMG GT4	155	(Turkey) Mustafa-Mehmet Kaya	4
(Germany) Black Falcon Team TEXTAR	Mercedes-AMG GT4	155	(Germany) Mike Stursberg	4
(Germany) Black Falcon Team TEXTAR	Mercedes-AMG GT4	155	(Italy) Gabriele Piana	4
(Germany) Black Falcon Team TEXTAR	Mercedes-AMG GT4	155	(Germany) 'Max'	5
(Italy) Mauro Simoncini	Alfa Romeo Giulia Quadrifoglio	157	(Italy) Bruno Barbaro	5
(Italy) Mauro Simoncini	Alfa Romeo Giulia Quadrifoglio	157	(Italy) Alberto Carobbio	5
(Italy) Mauro Simoncini	Alfa Romeo Giulia Quadrifoglio	157	(Italy) Mauro Simoncini	5
(Italy) Mauro Simoncini	Alfa Romeo Giulia Quadrifoglio	157	(Italy) Ugo Vicenzi	5
(United Kingdom) Garage 59	Aston Martin Vantage AMR GT4	160	(United Kingdom) Chris Goodwin	4–5
(United Kingdom) Garage 59	Aston Martin Vantage AMR GT4	160	(Sweden) Alexander West	4–5
(United Kingdom) Garage 59	Aston Martin Vantage AMR GT4	160	(United Kingdom) Darren Turner	5
(Germany) Walkenhorst Motorsport	BMW M4 GT4	181	(United Kingdom) Dan Harper	4–5
(Germany) Walkenhorst Motorsport	BMW M4 GT4	181	(Germany) Max Hesse	4–5
(Germany) Walkenhorst Motorsport	BMW M4 GT4	181	(Germany) Neil Verhagen	4–5
(Germany) Walkenhorst Motorsport	BMW M4 GT4	191	(Germany) Jörg Breuer	5
(Germany) Walkenhorst Motorsport	BMW M4 GT4	191	(United Kingdom) Ben Tuck	5
(Germany) Walkenhorst Motorsport	BMW M4 GT4	191	(Germany) Dirk-Tobias Wahl	5
(Germany) Walkenhorst Motorsport	BMW M4 GT4	191	(Germany) Florian Weber	5

=== SP10 ===
Team	Car	No.	Drivers	Events
(Germany) Pixum CFN Team Adrenalin Motorsport	BMW M4 GT4	1	(Germany) Yannick Fübrich	All
(Germany) Pixum CFN Team Adrenalin Motorsport	BMW M4 GT4	1	(Austria) David Griessner	All
(Germany) Pixum CFN Team Adrenalin Motorsport	BMW M4 GT4	1	(Germany) Florian Naumann	All
(Germany) W&S Motorsport	Porsche 718 Cayman GT4 Clubsport (982)	166	(Germany) Daniel Blickle	All
(Germany) W&S Motorsport	Porsche 718 Cayman GT4 Clubsport (982)	166	(Germany) Der Bommel	All
(Germany) W&S Motorsport	Porsche 718 Cayman GT4 Clubsport (982)	166	(Germany) Niklas Steinhaus	All
(Germany) FK Performance Motorsport	BMW M4 GT4	169	(Germany) Christian Konnerth	All
(Germany) FK Performance Motorsport	BMW M4 GT4	169	(Bulgaria) Pavel Lefterov	All
(Germany) FK Performance Motorsport	BMW M4 GT4	169	(Germany) Nico Otto	All
(Germany) Novel Racing with Toyo Tire by Ring Racing	Toyota GR Supra GT4	170	(Germany) Andreas Gülden	1–4
(Germany) Novel Racing with Toyo Tire by Ring Racing	Toyota GR Supra GT4	170	(Germany) Uwe Kleen	1–4
(Germany) Novel Racing with Toyo Tire by Ring Racing	Toyota GR Supra GT4	170	(Germany) Michael Tischner	1–4
(Germany) PROsport Racing	Aston Martin Vantage AMR GT4	176	(Belgium) Guido Dumarey	All
(Germany) PROsport Racing	Aston Martin Vantage AMR GT4	176	(Switzerland) Alexander Walker	1–4
(Germany) PROsport Racing	Aston Martin Vantage AMR GT4	176	(Belgium) Nico Verdonck	1, 5
(Germany) PROsport Racing	Aston Martin Vantage AMR GT4	176	(Germany) Michael Hess	5
(Germany) Allied Racing	Porsche 718 Cayman GT4 Clubsport (982)	177	(Denmark) Nicolaj Møller Madsen	1–3, 5
(Germany) Allied Racing	Porsche 718 Cayman GT4 Clubsport (982)	177	(Germany) Jan Kasperlik	1–2, 5
(Germany) Allied Racing	Porsche 718 Cayman GT4 Clubsport (982)	177	(Germany) Jörg Viebahn	3
(Germany) Allied Racing	Porsche 718 Cayman GT4 Clubsport (982)	177	(Germany) Dennis Fetzer	5
(Germany) KKrämer Racing	Ginetta G55 GT4	188	(United States) Jean-Francois Brunot	5
(Germany) KKrämer Racing	Ginetta G55 GT4	188	(United States) Andreas Gabler	5
(Germany) KKrämer Racing	Ginetta G55 GT4	188	(United Kingdom) Colin White	5
(Germany) KKrämer Racing	Ginetta G55 GT4	188	(Germany) Danny Lehner	5
(Germany) Walkenhorst Motorsport	BMW M4 GT4	191	(United Kingdom) Ben Tuck	1–3
(Germany) Walkenhorst Motorsport	BMW M4 GT4	191	(Germany) Florian Weber	1–3
(Germany) Walkenhorst Motorsport	BMW M4 GT4	191	(Germany) Jörg Breuer	1
(Germany) Walkenhorst Motorsport	BMW M4 GT4	191	(Germany) Dirk-Tobias Wahl	2–3
(Germany) Hofor Racing by Bonk Motorsport	BMW M4 GT4	190	(Austria) Michael Fischer	4
(Germany) Hofor Racing by Bonk Motorsport	BMW M4 GT4	190	(Italy) Gabriele Piana	4
(Germany) Hofor Racing by Bonk Motorsport	BMW M4 GT4	190	(Germany) Michael Schrey	4
(Germany) Hofor Racing by Bonk Motorsport	BMW M4 GT4	192	(Germany) Michael Schrey	All
(Germany) Hofor Racing by Bonk Motorsport	BMW M4 GT4	192	(Austria) Michael Fischer	1–3, 5
(Germany) Hofor Racing by Bonk Motorsport	BMW M4 GT4	192	(Italy) Gabriele Piana	1–3, 5
(Germany) Hofor Racing by Bonk Motorsport	BMW M4 GT4	192	(Germany) Claudia Hürtgen	4
(Germany) Hofor Racing by Bonk Motorsport	BMW M4 GT4	192	(Germany) Alexander Prinz	4
(Germany) Hofor Racing by Bonk Motorsport	BMW M4 GT4	192	(Germany) Sebastian von Gartzen	4

=== TCR ===
Team	Car	No.	Drivers	Class	Events
(Germany) mathilda racing	CUPRA León Competición TCR	12	(Germany) Heiko Hammel	P	4
(Germany) mathilda racing	CUPRA León Competición TCR	12	(Switzerland) Mathias Schläppi	P	4
(Germany) mathilda racing	CUPRA León TCR	806	(Germany) Heiko Hammel	P	1–2
(Germany) mathilda racing	CUPRA León TCR	806	(Germany) Matthias Wasel	P	1–2
(Germany) Profi-Car Team Halder	Honda Civic Type-R TCR (FK8)	821	(Germany) Dominik Fugel	Am	1–2
(Germany) Profi-Car Team Halder	Honda Civic Type-R TCR (FK8)	821	(Germany) Mike Halder	Am	1–2
(Germany) Profi-Car Team Halder	Honda Civic Type-R TCR (FK8)	821	(Portugal) Tiago Monteiro	Am	1
(Germany) Lubner Motorsport	Opel Astra TCR	822	(Germany) Michael Brüggenkamp	Am	1
(Germany) Lubner Motorsport	Opel Astra TCR	822	(Switzerland) Roland Schmid	Am	1
(Germany) Lubner Motorsport	Opel Astra TCR	822	(Switzerland) Roger Vögeli	Am	1
(Germany) Lubner Motorsport	Opel Astra TCR	822	(Finland) Ilkka Kariste	Am	4
(Germany) Lubner Motorsport	Opel Astra TCR	822	(Finland) Hannu Luostarinen	Am	4
(Germany) Lubner Motorsport	Opel Astra TCR	822	(Germany) Lucas Waltermann	Am	4
(Germany) Hyundai Team Engstler	Hyundai i30 N TCR	823	(Germany) Luca Engstler	P	4
(Germany) Hyundai Team Engstler	Hyundai i30 N TCR	823	(Germany) Robin Jahr	P	4
(South Korea) Hyundai Motorsport	Hyundai Veloster N TCR	830	(Germany) Marc Basseng	P	5
(South Korea) Hyundai Motorsport	Hyundai Veloster N TCR	830	(Germany) Luca Engstler	P	5
(South Korea) Hyundai Motorsport	Hyundai Veloster N TCR	830	(Germany) Manuel Lauck	P	5

Icon	Class
P	Pro Cup
Am	Am Cup

=== Other classes ===
Cup 2
Team	Car	No.	Drivers	Events
(Germany) Teichmann Racing	Porsche 991 GT3 Cup	112	(Germany) Alex Autumn	2, 4
(Germany) Teichmann Racing	Porsche 991 GT3 Cup	112	(Germany) Marc Hennerici	2, 4
(Germany) 9und11 Racing Team	Porsche 991 GT3 Cup	120	(Germany) Georg Goder	2–5
(Germany) 9und11 Racing Team	Porsche 991 GT3 Cup	120	(Germany) Martin Schlüter	2–5
(Germany) 9und11 Racing Team	Porsche 991 GT3 Cup	120	(Germany) Ralf Oehme	2, 4
(Germany) 9und11 Racing Team	Porsche 991 GT3 Cup	120	(Germany) Tim Scheerbarth	3, 5
(Germany) 9und11 Racing Team	Porsche 991 GT3 Cup	120	(Germany) Dirk Leßmeister	5
SP6
Team	Car	No.	Drivers	Events
(Germany) rent2drive-FAMILIA-racing	Porsche 991 GT3 Cup	202	(Germany) David Ackermann	1–2, 4
(Germany) rent2drive-FAMILIA-racing	Porsche 991 GT3 Cup	202	(Germany) Jörg Wiskirchen	1–2
(Germany) rent2drive-FAMILIA-racing	Porsche 991 GT3 Cup	202	(Germany) Stefan Müller	1
(Germany) rent2drive-FAMILIA-racing	Porsche 991 GT3 Cup	202	(Germany) Carsten Welschar	2
(Germany) rent2drive-FAMILIA-racing	Porsche 991 GT3 Cup	202	(Germany) Winfried Assmann	4
(Germany) rent2drive-FAMILIA-racing	Porsche 991 GT3 Cup	202	(Hungary) Csaba Walter	4
	Porsche Cayman GT4 Clubsport MR	212	(Germany) Volker Wawer	2, 5
	Porsche Cayman GT4 Clubsport MR	212	(Germany) Stefan Schmickler	2
	Porsche Cayman GT4 Clubsport MR	212	(Germany) Marcus Schmickler	4–5
	Porsche Cayman GT4 Clubsport MR	212	(Germany) Achim Wawer	4–5
SP5
Team	Car	No.	Drivers	Events
	Subaru BRZ Cup	222	(Germany) Lucian Gavris	4–5
	Subaru BRZ Cup	222	(Germany) Tim Schrick	4–5
SP4
Team	Car	No.	Drivers	Events
(Germany) JS Competition	BMW 325i	249	(Germany) Jonas Spölgen	1, 5
(Germany) JS Competition	BMW 325i	249	(Belgium) Steven Maris	1
(Germany) JS Competition	BMW 325i	249	(Germany) Olaf Hoppelshäuser	4
(Germany) JS Competition	BMW 325i	249	(Germany) Uwe Stein	4–5
(Germany) JS Competition	BMW 325i	249	(Germany) Axel Wiegner	5
	BMW 325i	250	(Germany) Herrmann Kahrs	4
	BMW 325i	250	(Germany) Uwe Stockhausen	4
	BMW 325i	252	(Germany) Uwe Stockhausen	5
	BMW 325i	252	(Germany) NexD e.K.	5
	BMW 325i	252	(Germany) Stephan-Wilhelm Schroers	5
	BMW 325i	252	(Germany) Wilfried Selbach	5
(Germany) ePS-Rennsport	BMW 325i	251	(Germany) Thomas Ardelt	2
(Germany) ePS-Rennsport	BMW 325i	251	(Germany) Christian Dannesberger	2
(Germany) ePS-Rennsport	BMW 325i	251	(Germany) Henning Deuster	2
	BMW 325i	258	(Germany) Daniel Odenthal	2–3
	BMW 325i	258	(Germany) Julian Odenthal	2–3
	BMW 325i	258	(Germany) David Von Der Mark	2–3
SP4T
Team	Car	No.	Drivers	Events
	Porsche 718 Cayman GT4 Clubsport	263	(Germany) Ralf Zensen	4–5
	Porsche 718 Cayman GT4 Clubsport	263	(Germany) Alexander Köppen	4
	Porsche 718 Cayman GT4 Clubsport	263	(Netherlands) Yann Munhowen	4
	Porsche 718 Cayman GT4 Clubsport	263	(Luxembourg) Alain Pier	4
	Porsche 718 Cayman GT4 Clubsport	263	(Germany) Oliver Louisoder	5
	Porsche 718 Cayman GT4 Clubsport	263	(Germany) Klaus Müller	5
	Porsche 718 Cayman GT4 Clubsport	263	(Germany) Fabian Peitzmeier	5
(Germany) MSC Münster e.V. DMV	Porsche Cayman S	266	(Germany) Peter Bonk	1, 5
(Germany) MSC Münster e.V. DMV	Porsche Cayman S	266	(Netherlands) Marco van Ramshorst	1, 5
SP3
Team	Car	No.	Drivers	Events
(Belgium) Pit Lane - AMC Sankt Vith	Toyota GT86 Cup	269	(Germany) Alexander Müller	All
(Belgium) Pit Lane - AMC Sankt Vith	Toyota GT86 Cup	269	(Belgium) Olivier Muytjens	1
(Belgium) Pit Lane - AMC Sankt Vith	Toyota GT86 Cup	269	(Belgium) 'Brody'	2
(Belgium) Pit Lane - AMC Sankt Vith	Toyota GT86 Cup	269	(Belgium) Jacques Derenne	3
(Belgium) Pit Lane - AMC Sankt Vith	Toyota GT86 Cup	269	(Switzerland) Manuel Amweg	5
(Belgium) Pit Lane - AMC Sankt Vith	Toyota GT86 Cup	269	(Germany) Oliver Sprungmann	5
(Belgium) Pit Lane - AMC Sankt Vith	Toyota GT86 Cup	270	(Belgium) Tom Cloet	1–4
(Belgium) Pit Lane - AMC Sankt Vith	Toyota GT86 Cup	270	(Belgium) Jacques Derenne	1–2, 4–5
(Belgium) Pit Lane - AMC Sankt Vith	Toyota GT86 Cup	270	(Belgium) 'Brody'	1, 3–5
(Belgium) Pit Lane - AMC Sankt Vith	Toyota GT86 Cup	270	(Belgium) Olivier Muytjens	2–5
	Subaru BRZ Cup	272	(Germany) Lucian Gavris	1–3
	Subaru BRZ Cup	272	(Germany) Tim Schrick	1–3
(Germany) Team 9 und 11	Toyota GT86 Cup	273	(Germany) 'Calimero'	2, 4
(Germany) Team 9 und 11	Toyota GT86 Cup	273	(Germany) Dirk Leßmeister	5
(Germany) Team 9 und 11	Toyota GT86 Cup	273	(Germany) Robert Keil	5
	Dacia Logan	280	(Germany) Oliver Kriese	3
	Dacia Logan	280	(Germany) 'Doom'	3
(Switzerland) Autorama AG	Toyota GT86 Cup	281	(Switzerland) Armando Stanco	4
(Switzerland) Autorama AG	Toyota GT86 Cup	281	(Switzerland) Dario Stanco	4
SP3T
Team	Car	No.	Drivers	Events
(Germany) Max Kruse Racing	Volkswagen Golf GTI TCR	10	(Germany) Andreas Gülden	4–5
(Germany) Max Kruse Racing	Volkswagen Golf GTI TCR	10	(Germany) Benjamin Leuchter	4–5
(Germany) Max Kruse Racing	Volkswagen Golf GTI TCR	10	(Switzerland) Jasmin Preisig	4–5
(Germany) Max Kruse Racing	Volkswagen Golf GTI TCR	333	(Netherlands) Tom Coronel	4–5
(Germany) Max Kruse Racing	Volkswagen Golf GTI TCR	333	(Germany) Benjamin Leuchter	4–5
(Germany) Giti Tire Motorsport By WS Racing	Volkswagen Golf GTI TCR	300	(Germany) Carrie Schreiner	1–3, 5
(Germany) Giti Tire Motorsport By WS Racing	Volkswagen Golf GTI TCR	300	(France) Célia Martin	1–3, 5
(Germany) Giti Tire Motorsport By WS Racing	Volkswagen Golf GTI TCR	300	(Austria) Laura Kraihamer	1, 3, 5
(Germany) Giti Tire Motorsport By WS Racing	Volkswagen Golf	335	(Germany) Christian Bock	4
(Germany) Giti Tire Motorsport By WS Racing	Volkswagen Golf	335	(Germany) Ulrich Schmidt	4
	Volkswagen Golf	303	(Germany) Thomas Mennecke	1–2, 4–5
	Volkswagen Golf	303	(Germany) Alexander Schmidt	1–2, 4–5
	Volkswagen Golf	303	(Germany) Jens Wulf	1–2
	Volkswagen Golf	303	(Germany) Christian Meurer	5
(Germany) Profi Car Team Halder	CUPRA León TCR	307	(Germany) Michelle Halder	1–2
(Germany) Profi Car Team Halder	CUPRA León TCR	307	(Germany) Mike Halder	1–2
(Germany) Bonk Motorsport	Audi RS3 LMS TCR	310	(Germany) Hermann Bock	2–5
(Germany) Bonk Motorsport	Audi RS3 LMS TCR	310	(Germany) Michael Bonk	2–4
(Germany) Bonk Motorsport	Audi RS3 LMS TCR	310	(Germany) Max Partl	5
(Germany) Bonk Motorsport	Audi RS3 LMS TCR	310	(Germany) Alexander Prinz	5
(Germany) Team Mathol Racing e.V.	SEAT León Cup Racer	311	(Germany) Jörg Kittelmann	All
(Germany) Team Mathol Racing e.V.	SEAT León Cup Racer	311	(Germany) Wolfgang Weber	All
(Germany) Team Mathol Racing e.V.	SEAT León Cup Racer	311	(Austria) Harald Proczyk	5
(Germany) MSC Sinzig e.V. im ADAC	Audi RS3 LMS TCR	321	(Denmark) Kristian Jepsen	2–3
(Germany) MSC Sinzig e.V. im ADAC	Audi RS3 LMS TCR	321	(Denmark) Jan Sorensen	2–3
(Germany) MSC Sinzig e.V. im ADAC	Volkswagen Golf GTI TCR	322	(Germany) Volker Garrn	1, 4
(Germany) MSC Sinzig e.V. im ADAC	Volkswagen Golf GTI TCR	322	(Liechtenstein) Johann Wanger	1
(Germany) MSC Sinzig e.V. im ADAC	Volkswagen Golf GTI TCR	322	(Germany) Jens Wulf	4
(Germany) MSC Sinzig e.V. im ADAC	Volkswagen Golf GTI TCR	322	(Denmark) Kristian Jepsen	5
(Germany) MSC Sinzig e.V. im ADAC	Volkswagen Golf GTI TCR	322	(Denmark) Jan Sorensen	5
(Germany) MSC Sinzig e.V. im ADAC	Volkswagen Golf GTI TCR	323	(Liechtenstein) Stefan Tribelhorn	4–5
(Germany) MSC Sinzig e.V. im ADAC	Volkswagen Golf GTI TCR	323	(Liechtenstein) Johann Wanger	4
(Germany) MSC Sinzig e.V. im ADAC	Volkswagen Golf GTI TCR	323	(Germany) Uwe Bitschnau	5
(Germany) MSC Sinzig e.V. im ADAC	Volkswagen Golf GTI TCR	323	(Germany) Jens Wulf	5
(Germany) MSC Münster e.V. DMV	Honda Civic Type-R	334	(Germany) Insa Jaeschke	1
(Germany) MSC Münster e.V. DMV	Honda Civic Type-R	334	(Germany) Florian Raß	1
(Germany) mathilda racing	CUPRA León TCR	806	(Germany) Matthias Wasel	3–5
(Germany) mathilda racing	CUPRA León TCR	806	(Germany) Heiko Hammel	3, 5
(Germany) mathilda racing	CUPRA León TCR	806	(Germany) Kai Jordan	4–5
(Germany) mathilda racing	CUPRA León TCR	806	(Switzerland) Mathias Schläppi	4
SP-PRO
Team	Car	No.	Drivers	Events
(Germany) Black Falcon	Porsche 911 GT3 Cup MR	350	(Germany) Marek Böckmann	All
(Germany) Black Falcon	Porsche 911 GT3 Cup MR	350	(Germany) Tobias Müller	All
(Germany) Black Falcon	Porsche 911 GT3 Cup MR	350	(Luxembourg) Carlos Rivas	All
(Germany) Black Falcon	Porsche 911 GT3 Cup MR	350	(Germany) Maik Rosenberg	5
SP2T
Team	Car	No.	Drivers	Events
(Switzerland) Team Rallye Top	Peugeot RCZ Cup	385	(Switzerland) Bernhard Badertscher	1, 4–5
(Switzerland) Team Rallye Top	Peugeot RCZ Cup	385	(Switzerland) Max Langenegger	1, 4–5
V6
Team	Car	No.	Drivers	Events
(Germany) Black Falcon Team TEXTAR	Porsche 911 Carrera	395	(Switzerland) Andreas Renk	1
(Germany) Black Falcon Team TEXTAR	Porsche 911 Carrera	395	(Germany) Martin Meenen	1
(Germany) Pixum CFN Team Adrenalin Motorsport	Porsche Cayman S	396	(Spain) Carlos Arimón Solivellas	All
(Germany) Pixum CFN Team Adrenalin Motorsport	Porsche Cayman S	396	(Germany) Christian Büllesbach	All
(Germany) Pixum CFN Team Adrenalin Motorsport	Porsche Cayman S	396	(Germany) Ulrich Korn	All
(Germany) Pixum CFN Team Adrenalin Motorsport	Porsche Cayman S	396	(Germany) Andreas Schettler	All
	Porsche 911	415	(Germany) Anna Lena Binkowska	5
	Porsche 911	415	(Germany) David Binkowska	5
	Porsche 911	415	(Germany) Dietmar Binkowska	5
(Germany) Team Mathol Racing e.V.	Porsche Cayman S	435	(Germany) Mike Beckhusen	2
(Germany) Team Mathol Racing e.V.	Porsche Cayman S	435	(France) Jules Gounon	2
(Germany) Team Mathol Racing e.V.	Porsche Cayman S	436	(Germany) "Montana"	2
(Germany) Team Mathol Racing e.V.	Porsche Cayman S	436	(Germany) Timo Mölig	2
V5
Team	Car	No.	Drivers	Events
(Germany) PROsport Racing	Porsche Cayman	437	(Netherlands) Paul Harkema	1
(Germany) PROsport Racing	Porsche Cayman	437	(Netherlands) Niels Langeveld	1
(Germany) PROsport Racing	Porsche Cayman	437	(Germany) Dennis Fetzer	2–3
(Germany) PROsport Racing	Porsche Cayman	437	(Germany) Maximilian Koch	2–3
(Germany) 9und11 Racing Team	Porsche Cayman	440	(Germany) Leonard Oehme	All
(Germany) 9und11 Racing Team	Porsche Cayman	440	(Germany) Niklas Oehme	1, 3, 5
(Germany) 9und11 Racing Team	Porsche Cayman	440	(Germany) Ralf Oehme	1, 3, 5
(Germany) 9und11 Racing Team	Porsche Cayman	440	(Germany) Tim Scheerbarth	2, 4
(Germany) Pixum CFN Team Adrenalin Motorsport	Porsche Cayman	444	(Germany) Norbert Fischer	All
(Germany) Pixum CFN Team Adrenalin Motorsport	Porsche Cayman	444	(Norway) Oskar Sandberg	All
(Germany) Pixum CFN Team Adrenalin Motorsport	Porsche Cayman	444	(Germany) Daniel Zils	All
(Germany) Pixum CFN Team Adrenalin Motorsport	Porsche Cayman	444	(Germany) Nikolaus Schelle	5
(Germany) Pixum CFN Team Adrenalin Motorsport	Porsche Cayman	445	(Germany) Daniel Attallah	5
(Germany) Pixum CFN Team Adrenalin Motorsport	Porsche Cayman	445	(Mexico) Juan Carlos Carmona	5
(Germany) Pixum CFN Team Adrenalin Motorsport	Porsche Cayman	445	(Germany) Laura Luft	5
	Porsche Cayman	456	(Germany) Phil Hill	1–3
	Porsche Cayman	456	(Denmark) Kaj Schubert	1–3
	Porsche Cayman	456	(Germany) André Krumbach	1–2
(Germany) FK Performance Motorsport	Porsche Cayman	458	(Switzerland) Mauro Calamia	5
(Germany) FK Performance Motorsport	Porsche Cayman	458	(Switzerland) Ivan Jacoma	5
(Germany) FK Performance Motorsport	Porsche Cayman	458	(Italy) Roberto Pampanini	5
(Germany) W&S Motorsport	Porsche Cayman	460	(Switzerland) Mauro Calamia	2–3
(Germany) W&S Motorsport	Porsche Cayman	460	(Italy) Roberto Pampanini	2–3
(Germany) W&S Motorsport	Porsche Cayman	460	(Switzerland) Benedikt Frei	5
(Germany) W&S Motorsport	Porsche Cayman	460	(Switzerland) Viktor Schyrba	5
(Germany) W&S Motorsport	Porsche Cayman	460	(Switzerland) Markus Zünd	5
(Germany) W&S Motorsport	Porsche Cayman	460	(Switzerland) Urs Zünd	5
(Germany) W&S Motorsport	Porsche Cayman	461	(Germany) Charles Bruchmann	2, 5
(Germany) W&S Motorsport	Porsche Cayman	461	(France) Sébastien Carcone	2, 5
(Germany) W&S Motorsport	Porsche Cayman	461	(Germany) Andreas Schaflitzl	5
	BMW M3 E36	466	(Germany) Holger Gachot	1–2, 4
	BMW M3 E36	466	(Germany) Sophia Gachot	1, 4
	BMW M3 E36	466	(Germany) Jérôme Larbi	2, 4
VT3
Team	Car	No.	Drivers	Events
	Porsche 718 Cayman GT4 Clubsport	472	(Germany) Kim Berwanger	2
	Porsche 718 Cayman GT4 Clubsport	472	(Germany) Alexander Köppen	2
	Porsche 718 Cayman GT4 Clubsport	472	(Germany) Erich Zanders	2
	Porsche 718 Cayman GT4 Clubsport	473	(Germany) Steven Fürsch	1–2
	Porsche 718 Cayman GT4 Clubsport	473	(Germany) Fabian Peitzmeier	1–2
	Porsche 718 Cayman GT4 Clubsport	473	(Germany) Ralf Zensen	1–2
	Porsche 718 Cayman GT4 Clubsport	473	(Germany) Jürgen Bretschneider	1
	Porsche 718 Cayman GT4 Clubsport	473	(Netherlands) Patrick Huisman	2
(Germany) Team Mathol Racing e.V.	Porsche 718 Cayman GT4 Clubsport	474	(Germany) Alex Fielenbach	All
(Germany) Team Mathol Racing e.V.	Porsche 718 Cayman GT4 Clubsport	474	(Germany) Wolfgang Weber	All
(Germany) Team Mathol Racing e.V.	Porsche 718 Cayman GT4 Clubsport	474	(Germany) Mike Beckhusen	2–3
(Germany) Team Mathol Racing e.V.	Porsche 718 Cayman GT4 Clubsport	474	(France) Jules Gounon	2–3
(Germany) Team Mathol Racing e.V.	Porsche 718 Cayman GT4 Clubsport	474	(Germany) Kim Berwanger	5
(Germany) Team Mathol Racing e.V.	Porsche 718 Cayman GT4 Clubsport	474	(Germany) Reinhold Renger	5
VT2
Team	Car	No.	Drivers	Events
(Germany) Pixum CFN Team Adrenalin Motorsport	BMW 330i Racing (2020)	480	(Germany) Christopher Rink	All
(Germany) Pixum CFN Team Adrenalin Motorsport	BMW 330i Racing (2020)	480	(Germany) Philipp Stahlschmidt	All
(Germany) Pixum CFN Team Adrenalin Motorsport	BMW 330i Racing (2020)	481	(Switzerland) Robert van Husen	All
(Germany) Pixum CFN Team Adrenalin Motorsport	BMW 330i Racing (2020)	481	(Italy) Edoardo Bugane	1–3, 5
(Germany) Pixum CFN Team Adrenalin Motorsport	BMW 330i Racing (2020)	481	(Italy) Francesco Bugane	1–3
(Germany) Pixum CFN Team Adrenalin Motorsport	BMW 330i Racing (2020)	481	(Italy) Giacomo Altoè	4
(Germany) Pixum CFN Team Adrenalin Motorsport	BMW 330i Racing (2020)	481	(Italy) Andrea Caldarelli	4
(Germany) Pixum CFN Team Adrenalin Motorsport	BMW 330i Racing (2020)	481	(Germany) Joachim Nett	5
(Germany) Pixum CFN Team Adrenalin Motorsport	BMW 330i Racing (2020)	481	(Germany) Jürgen Nett	5
(Germany) ROJA Motorsport	Hyundai i30 Fastback N	482	(Germany) Robin Jahr	All
(Germany) ROJA Motorsport	Hyundai i30 Fastback N	482	(Germany) Luca Engstler	1–3, 5
(Germany) ROJA Motorsport	Hyundai i30 Fastback N	482	(Germany) Olaf Jahr	1, 4–5
(Germany) ROJA Motorsport	Hyundai i30 Fastback N	482	(Germany) Felix Schumann	2–4
(Germany) ROJA Motorsport	Hyundai i30 Fastback N	482	(Germany) Peter Schumann	5
(Germany) ROJA Motorsport	Hyundai i30 Fastback N	496	(Germany) Daniel Mertens	1
(Germany) ROJA Motorsport	Hyundai i30 Fastback N	496	(Germany) Stephan-Wilhelm Schroers	1
(Germany) ROJA Motorsport	Hyundai i30 Fastback N	496	(Germany) Christian-Alexander Dannesberger	1
(Germany) JS Competition	BMW F12 125i	483	(Germany) Matthias Möller	All
(Germany) JS Competition	BMW F12 125i	483	(Germany) Fabian Pirrone	All
	Mercedes Benz C300	484	(Germany) Alexander Meixner	1, 3–5
	Mercedes Benz C300	484	(Germany) Bernhard Weber	1, 3–5
	Mercedes Benz C300	484	(Germany) Nick Hancke	1, 5
	Mercedes Benz C300	484	(Germany) Christoph Breuer	4
	Mercedes Benz C300	484	(Germany) Sascha Hancke	5
(Germany) FK Performance Motorsport	BMW 330i Racing (2020)	485	(Norway) Inge Hansesaetre	1–3
(Germany) FK Performance Motorsport	BMW 330i Racing (2020)	485	(Germany) Patrick Hinte	1–3
(Germany) FK Performance Motorsport	BMW 330i Racing (2020)	485	(Germany) Lars Peucker	1
(Germany) FK Performance Motorsport	BMW 330i Racing (2020)	485	(Switzerland) Ranko Mijatovic	2–3
(Germany) Team AVIA Sorg Rennsport	BMW 330i Racing (2020)	488	(Germany) Carl-Friedrich Kolb	1, 4
(Germany) Team AVIA Sorg Rennsport	BMW 330i Racing (2020)	488	(Germany) Rasmus Helmich	1, 5
(Germany) Team AVIA Sorg Rennsport	BMW 330i Racing (2020)	488	(Germany) Philip Schauerte	1
(Germany) Team AVIA Sorg Rennsport	BMW 330i Racing (2020)	488	(Germany) Reinhard Schmiedel	4–5
(Germany) Team AVIA Sorg Rennsport	BMW 330i Racing (2020)	488	(Italy) Ugo Vicenzi	4
(Germany) Team AVIA Sorg Rennsport	BMW 330i Racing (2020)	488	(Panama) Luis Ramirez	5
(Germany) Team AVIA Sorg Rennsport	BMW 330i Racing (2020)	488	(Netherlands) Jan Jaap van Roon	5
(Germany) Team AVIA Sorg Rennsport	BMW 330i Racing (2020)	504	(Turkey) Emir Asari	All
(Germany) Team AVIA Sorg Rennsport	BMW 330i Racing (2020)	504	(Germany) Nicolas Griebner	1–4
(Germany) Team AVIA Sorg Rennsport	BMW 330i Racing (2020)	504	(Germany) Björn Simon	1–4
(Germany) Team AVIA Sorg Rennsport	BMW 330i Racing (2020)	504	(Germany) Thomas Ardelt	5
(Germany) Team AVIA Sorg Rennsport	BMW 330i Racing (2020)	504	(Germany) Carl-Friedrich Kolb	5
(Germany) Team AVIA Sorg Rennsport	BMW 330i Racing (2020)	504	(Germany) Philip Schauerte	5
(Germany) Giti Tire Motorsport By WS Racing	Volkswagen Golf VII GTI	490	(Germany) Axel Jahn	All
(Germany) Giti Tire Motorsport By WS Racing	Volkswagen Golf VII GTI	490	(Germany) Ulrich Schmidt	All
(Germany) Giti Tire Motorsport By WS Racing	Volkswagen Golf VII GTI	490	(Germany) Andrei Sidorenko	1
(Germany) Giti Tire Motorsport By WS Racing	Volkswagen Golf VII GTI	490	(Switzerland) Sven Friesecke	2–5
(Germany) Giti Tire Motorsport By WS Racing	Volkswagen Golf VII GTI	490	(Germany) Lutz Wolzenburg	5
	Renault Mégane RS	493	(Germany) Ralf Wiesner	1–3
	Renault Mégane RS	493	(Germany) Carsten Erpenbach	1–3
(Germany) MSC Adenau	BMW 328i	494	(Germany) Simon Eibl	2–5
(Germany) MSC Adenau	BMW 328i	494	(Germany) Eric Petrich	2–5
(Germany) MSC Adenau	BMW 328i	494	(Germany) Bernhard Wagner	2–5
(Germany) Manheller Racing	BMW 3 Series F30	495	(United Kingdom) Martin Owen	All
(Germany) Manheller Racing	BMW 3 Series F30	495	(Germany) Kurt Strube	All
(Germany) Manheller Racing	BMW 3 Series F30	495	(Germany) Harald Barth	1–3, 5
(Germany) Manheller Racing	BMW 3 Series F30	495	(Germany) Uwe Krumscheid	4
(Germany) Manheller Racing	BMW 3 Series F30	495	(Austria) Markus Fischer	5
(Germany) Manheller Racing	BMW 3 Series F30	510	(Germany) Carsten Knechtges	All
(Germany) Manheller Racing	BMW 3 Series F30	510	(Germany) Marcel Manheller	All
(Germany) Manheller Racing	BMW 3 Series F30	510	(Germany) Janis Waldow	All
(Germany) Hyundai Team Engstler	Hyundai i30 Fastback N	498	(Germany) Luca Engstler	1
(Germany) Hyundai Team Engstler	Hyundai i30 Fastback N	498	(Germany) Kai Jordan	1
(Germany) Hyundai Team Engstler	Hyundai i30 Fastback N	498	(Germany) Markus Lungstrass	1
(Germany) Keeevin Sports & Racing	Renault Mégane RS	499	(Germany) Klaus Faßbender	All
(Germany) Keeevin Sports & Racing	Renault Mégane RS	499	(Germany) Dirk Stegmann	1–3
(Germany) Keeevin Sports & Racing	Renault Mégane RS	499	(Germany) Christian Albinger	1, 3, 5
(Germany) Keeevin Sports & Racing	Renault Mégane RS	499	(Germany) Andreas Tasche	2
(Germany) Keeevin Sports & Racing	Renault Mégane RS	499	(Germany) Kevin Wolters	4–5
(Germany) Keeevin Sports & Racing	Renault Mégane RS	499	(Germany) Georg Kiefer	4
(Germany) Keeevin Sports & Racing	Renault Mégane RS	499	(Germany) Benjamin Decius	5
(Germany) mathilda racing	Volkswagen Scirocco R N24	500	(Germany) Timo Hochwind	All
(Germany) mathilda racing	Volkswagen Scirocco R N24	500	(Germany) Michael Paatz	All
(Germany) mathilda racing	Volkswagen Scirocco R N24	500	(Spain) Mikel Azcona	4
(Germany) MSC Adenau	Opel Astra OPC	501	(Germany) Tobias Jung	1–2, 4–5
(Germany) MSC Adenau	Opel Astra OPC	501	(Germany) Michael Eichhorn	1, 5
(Germany) MSC Adenau	Opel Astra OPC	501	(Germany) Daniel Jenichen	1, 5
(Germany) MSC Adenau	Opel Astra OPC	501	(Germany) Thomas Kiefer	2
(Germany) MSC Adenau	Opel Astra OPC	501	(Germany) Markus Weinstock	2, 4
(Germany) MSC Adenau	Opel Astra OPC	501	(Germany) Volker Strycek	4
(Germany) MSC Adenau	Opel Astra OPC	501	(France) Jean-Philippe Imparato	5
(Germany) MSC Adenau	Opel Astra OPC	508	(Germany) Tobias Jung	3
(Germany) MSC Adenau	Opel Astra OPC	508	(France) Jean-Philippe Imparato	3
(Germany) MSC Adenau	Opel Astra OPC	508	(Germany) Olivier Leibel-Perrois	3
	Renault Mégane	502	(Finland) Mika Kitola	1–2, 4
	Renault Mégane RS	506	(Luxembourg) Max Lamesch	2, 5
	Renault Mégane RS	506	(Germany) Andreas Patzelt	2, 5
	Renault Mégane RS	506	(Germany) Carsten Erpenbach	5
	Renault Mégane RS	512	(Luxembourg) Max Lamesch	3
	Renault Mégane RS	512	(Germany) Andreas Patzelt	3
(Germany) FUNmotorsport	BMW 330i Racing (2020)	509	(Switzerland) Mark Benz	5
(Germany) FUNmotorsport	BMW 330i Racing (2020)	509	(Germany) Christian Andreas Franz	5
(Germany) FUNmotorsport	BMW 330i Racing (2020)	509	(Germany) Carsten Welschar	5
	BMW 328i	511	(Germany) Carsten Ohlinger	2–4
	BMW 328i	511	(Germany) Guido Wirtz	2–4
	Volkswagen Scirocco N24	515	(Germany) Kevin Olaf Rost	1, 4
	Volkswagen Scirocco N24	515	(Germany) Olaf Rost	1, 4
V2
Team	Car	No.	Drivers	Events
	BMW 318i	549	(Germany) Manfred Schmitz	2–4
	BMW 318i	549	(Germany) Reiner Thomas	2–4
M2 CS
Team	Car	No.	Drivers	Events
(Germany) Walkenhorst Motorsport	BMW M2 ClubSport Racing	151	(Finland) Sami-Matti Trogen	2–3
(Germany) Walkenhorst Motorsport	BMW M2 ClubSport Racing	151	(Germany) Mario von Bohlen und Halbach	2–3
H4
Team	Car	No.	Drivers	Events
(Germany) Pixum CFN Team Adrenalin Motorsport	BMW M3 GTR	590	(Germany) Bernd Kleeschulte	1
(Germany) Pixum CFN Team Adrenalin Motorsport	BMW M3 GTR	595	(Germany) Bernd Kleeschulte	2–4
(Germany) Pixum CFN Team Adrenalin Motorsport	BMW M3 GTR	595	(Germany) Carsten Welschar	3
(Germany) clickversicherung.de Team	Porsche 911 GT3	600	(Germany) Robin Chrzanowski	4
(Germany) clickversicherung.de Team	Porsche 911 GT3	600	(Germany) Kersten Jodexnis	4
H2
Team	Car	No.	Drivers	Events
(Germany) Automobilclub von Deutschland	Opel Manta (Flying Fox) GT	601	(Germany) Olaf Beckmann	1–4
(Germany) Automobilclub von Deutschland	Opel Manta (Flying Fox) GT	601	(Germany) Peter Hass	1–4
(Germany) Automobilclub von Deutschland	Opel Manta (Flying Fox) GT	601	(Germany) Volker Strycek	1–4
(Germany) Scuderia Colonia e.V. im ADAC	Renault Clio	603	(Germany) Timo Beuth	1–4
(Germany) Scuderia Colonia e.V. im ADAC	Renault Clio	603	(Germany) Stephan Ernst	1–4
	Renault Clio	608	(Germany) Holger Goedicke	4
	Renault Clio	608	(Germany) Jens Schmitt	4
	Honda Civic Type-R	611	(Germany) Timo Drössiger	All
	Honda Civic Type-R	611	(Germany) Mark Giesbrecht	All
	Honda Civic Type-R	611	(Germany) Frank Kuhlmann	All
(Germany) Teichmann Racing	Renault Clio	613	(Germany) Tom Leswal	3
(Germany) Teichmann Racing	Renault Clio	613	(Germany) Jens Schmitt	3
	Renault Clio	614	(Germany) Daniel Overbeck	1–2, 4–5
	Renault Clio	614	(Germany) Tobias Overbeck	1–2, 4–5
(Germany) MSC Sinzig e.V. im ADAC	Renault Clio	615	(France) Tommy Fortchantre	2
(Germany) MSC Sinzig e.V. im ADAC	Renault Clio	615	(Germany) Noel Dohr	2
(Germany) MSC Sinzig e.V. im ADAC	Renault Clio	615	(Germany) Stefan Endres	2
(Germany) MSC Sinzig e.V. im ADAC	Volkswagen Golf	616	(Germany) Achim Ewenz	5
(Germany) MSC Sinzig e.V. im ADAC	Volkswagen Golf	616	(Germany) Ralph Liesenfeld	5
(Germany) MSC Sinzig e.V. im ADAC	Volkswagen Golf	616	(Germany) Stefan Endres	5
(Germany) AVIA Racing	Renault Clio	620	(Germany) Michael Bohrer	All
(Germany) AVIA Racing	Renault Clio	620	(Germany) Stephan Epp	All
(Germany) AVIA Racing	Renault Clio	620	(Germany) Gerrit Holthaus	All
	BMW 318i	622	(Germany) Anna Loewe	1–2, 5
	BMW 318i	622	(Germany) Romeo Loewe	1–2, 5
	Renault Clio	630	(Germany) Michael Uelwer	All
	Renault Clio	630	(Germany) Andreas Winterwerber	All
	Renault Clio	630	(Germany) Marc Wylach	All
AT(-G)
Team	Car	No.	Drivers	Events
	Ford Mustang	109	(Germany) Ralph Caba	1–4
	Ford Mustang	109	(Germany) Oliver Sprungmann	1–4
(Germany) Four Motors Bioconcept-Car	Porsche 911 GT3 Cup	320	(Germany) 'SMUDO'	5
(Germany) Four Motors Bioconcept-Car	Porsche 911 GT3 Cup	320	(Luxembourg) Charles Kauffman	5
(Germany) Four Motors Bioconcept-Car	Porsche 911 GT3 Cup	320	(Germany) Thomas Kiefer	5
(Germany) Four Motors Bioconcept-Car	Porsche 911 GT3 Cup	320	(Germany) 'Tom'	5
(Germany) Four Motors Bioconcept-Car	Porsche Cayman GT4 Clubsport MR	420	(Germany) Matthias Beckwermert	1, 4–5
(Germany) Four Motors Bioconcept-Car	Porsche Cayman GT4 Clubsport MR	420	(Switzerland) Marco Timbal	1, 4–5
(Germany) Four Motors Bioconcept-Car	Porsche Cayman GT4 Clubsport MR	420	(Germany) 'SMUDO'	1
(Germany) Four Motors Bioconcept-Car	Porsche Cayman GT4 Clubsport MR	420	(Germany) Thomas Kiefer	4
(Germany) Four Motors Bioconcept-Car	Porsche Cayman GT4 Clubsport MR	420	(Germany) 'Tom'	4
(Germany) Four Motors Bioconcept-Car	Porsche Cayman GT4 Clubsport MR	420	(Denmark) Henrik Bollerslev	5
Cup 5
Team	Car	No.	Drivers	Events
(Germany) Pixum CFN Team Adrenalin Motorsport	BMW M240i Racing	650	(Germany) Yannick Fübrich	All
(Germany) Pixum CFN Team Adrenalin Motorsport	BMW M240i Racing	650	(Austria) David Griessner	All
(Germany) Pixum CFN Team Adrenalin Motorsport	BMW M240i Racing	650	(Italy) Francesco Merlini	All
(Germany) Pixum CFN Team Adrenalin Motorsport	BMW M240i Racing	650	(Norway) Sindre Setsaas	All
(Germany) Pixum CFN Team Adrenalin Motorsport	BMW M240i Racing	651	(Germany) Roland Froese	All
(Germany) Pixum CFN Team Adrenalin Motorsport	BMW M240i Racing	651	(Germany) Marcel Fugel	1–3
(Germany) Pixum CFN Team Adrenalin Motorsport	BMW M240i Racing	651	(Germany) Philipp Kowalski	1
(Germany) Pixum CFN Team Adrenalin Motorsport	BMW M240i Racing	651	(Germany) Lars Harbeck	4–5
(Germany) Pixum CFN Team Adrenalin Motorsport	BMW M240i Racing	651	(Germany) Sven Markert	4–5
(Germany) Pixum CFN Team Adrenalin Motorsport	BMW M240i Racing	651	(Germany) Andreas Winkler	5
(Germany) Pixum CFN Team Adrenalin Motorsport	BMW M240i Racing	652	(Italy) Davide Bertello	All
(Germany) Pixum CFN Team Adrenalin Motorsport	BMW M240i Racing	652	(United Kingdom) Charlie Martin	All
(Germany) Pixum CFN Team Adrenalin Motorsport	BMW M240i Racing	652	(Germany) Lutz Marc Rühl	All
(Germany) Pixum CFN Team Adrenalin Motorsport	BMW M240i Racing	653	(Germany) Stefan Kruse	All
(Germany) Pixum CFN Team Adrenalin Motorsport	BMW M240i Racing	653	(Germany) Philipp Leisen	All
(Germany) Pixum CFN Team Adrenalin Motorsport	BMW M240i Racing	653	(Luxembourg) Charles Oakes	All
(Germany) Pixum CFN Team Adrenalin Motorsport	BMW M240i Racing	653	(Norway) Einar Thorsen	All
(Belgium) Hakan Sari	BMW M240i Racing	658	(Belgium) Hakan Sari	1
(Belgium) Hakan Sari	BMW M240i Racing	658	(Belgium) Recep Sari	1
(Germany) Schnitzelalm Racing	BMW M240i Racing	666	(Germany) Marcel Marchewicz	3–5
(Germany) Schnitzelalm Racing	BMW M240i Racing	666	(Germany) Tim Neuser	3–5
(Germany) Schnitzelalm Racing	BMW M240i Racing	666	(Argentina) Esteban Guerrieri	5
(Germany) Schnitzelalm Racing	BMW M240i Racing	666	(Germany) Luca-Sandro Trefz	5
(Germany) Schnitzelalm Racing	BMW M240i Racing	673	(Germany) Marcel Marchewicz	1–2
(Germany) Schnitzelalm Racing	BMW M240i Racing	673	(Germany) Tim Neuser	1–2
(Germany) Schnitzelalm Racing	BMW M240i Racing	673	(Germany) Luca-Sandro Trefz	4–5
(Germany) Schnitzelalm Racing	BMW M240i Racing	673	(Germany) Joe Bohnes	4
(Germany) Schnitzelalm Racing	BMW M240i Racing	673	(Germany) Anton Hahnenkamm	4
(Germany) Schnitzelalm Racing	BMW M240i Racing	673	(Germany) Jens Bombosch	5
(Germany) Schnitzelalm Racing	BMW M240i Racing	673	(Germany) Vincent Noel Dohr	5
(Germany) Schnitzelalm Racing	BMW M240i Racing	673	(Germany) Kevin Wambach	5
(Germany) Schnitzelalm Racing	BMW M240i Racing	693	(Germany) Yves Volte	1–3
(Germany) Schnitzelalm Racing	BMW M240i Racing	693	(Netherlands) Jordy Van Rossenberg	1
(Germany) Schnitzelalm Racing	BMW M240i Racing	693	(Germany) Luca-Sandro Trefz	2–3
(Germany) ADAC Berlin-Brandenburg	BMW M240i Racing	674	(Germany) Lars Harbeck	1–2
(Germany) ADAC Berlin-Brandenburg	BMW M240i Racing	674	(Germany) Sven Markert	1–2
(Germany) ADAC Berlin-Brandenburg	BMW M240i Racing	674	(Netherlands) Donald Molenaar	1–2
(Germany) FK Performance Motorsport	BMW M240i Racing	677	(Germany) Ben Bünnagel	All
(Germany) FK Performance Motorsport	BMW M240i Racing	677	(Germany) Nick Wüstenhagen	All
(Germany) FK Performance Motorsport	BMW M240i Racing	677	(Switzerland) Gustavo Xavier	All
(Germany) FK Performance Motorsport	BMW M240i Racing	677	(Germany) Marc Ehret	5
(Germany) FK Performance Motorsport	BMW M240i Racing	679	(United Kingdom) Dan Harper	2–3
(Germany) FK Performance Motorsport	BMW M240i Racing	679	(Germany) Max Hesse	2
(Germany) FK Performance Motorsport	BMW M240i Racing	679	(Germany) Neil Verhagen	3
(Germany) FK Performance Motorsport	BMW M240i Racing	679	(Norway) Inge Hansesaetre	4
(Germany) FK Performance Motorsport	BMW M240i Racing	679	(Germany) Patrick Hinte	4
(Germany) FK Performance Motorsport	BMW M240i Racing	679	(Germany) Nico Otto	4
(Germany) Walkenhorst Motorsport	BMW M240i Racing	681	(United Kingdom) Josh Hislop	All
(Germany) Walkenhorst Motorsport	BMW M240i Racing	681	(United Kingdom) Tom Wood	1–3
(Germany) Walkenhorst Motorsport	BMW M240i Racing	681	(Netherlands) Job van Uitert	1
(Germany) Walkenhorst Motorsport	BMW M240i Racing	681	(United Kingdom) Will Tregurtha	2–4
(Germany) Walkenhorst Motorsport	BMW M240i Racing	681	(France) Thomas Neubauer	5
(Germany) Walkenhorst Motorsport	BMW M240i Racing	681	(Germany) Thomas Leyherr	5
(Germany) Walkenhorst Motorsport	BMW M240i Racing	681	(Germany) Davide Dehren	5
(Germany) Walkenhorst Motorsport	BMW M240i Racing	682	(Germany) Neil Verhagen	2–3
(Germany) Walkenhorst Motorsport	BMW M240i Racing	682	(United Kingdom) Dan Harper	2
(Germany) Walkenhorst Motorsport	BMW M240i Racing	682	(Germany) Max Hesse	3
(Germany) Walkenhorst Motorsport	BMW M240i Racing	682	(Netherlands) Job van Uitert	4
(Germany) Walkenhorst Motorsport	BMW M240i Racing	682	(United Kingdom) Tom Wood	4–5
(Germany) Walkenhorst Motorsport	BMW M240i Racing	682	(Australia) Aidan Read	5
(Germany) Walkenhorst Motorsport	BMW M240i Racing	682	(United Kingdom) Will Tregurtha	5
(Germany) Team AVIA Sorg Rennsport	BMW M240i Racing	694	(Russia) Ivan Berets	All
(Germany) Team AVIA Sorg Rennsport	BMW M240i Racing	694	(United Kingdom) Brett Lidsey	All
(Germany) Team AVIA Sorg Rennsport	BMW M240i Racing	694	(Germany) Kevin Wolters	1–3
(Germany) Team AVIA Sorg Rennsport	BMW M240i Racing	694	(United Kingdom) Moran Gott	5
(Germany) Team AVIA Sorg Rennsport	BMW M240i Racing	695	(Germany) Heiko Eichenberg	All
(Germany) Team AVIA Sorg Rennsport	BMW M240i Racing	695	(Germany) Moritz Oberheim	All
(Germany) Hofor Racing by Bonk Motorsport	BMW M240i Racing	700	(Germany) Michael Bonk	5
(Germany) Hofor Racing by Bonk Motorsport	BMW M240i Racing	700	(Germany) Axel Burghardt	5
(Germany) Hofor Racing by Bonk Motorsport	BMW M240i Racing	700	(Germany) Jürgen Meyer	5
(Germany) Hofor Racing by Bonk Motorsport	BMW M240i Racing	700	(Germany) Rainer Partl	5
V4
Team	Car	No.	Drivers	Events
(Germany) MSC Adenau	BMW 390L GSLA	477	(United Kingdom) Beat Schmitz	4–5
(Germany) MSC Adenau	BMW 390L GSLA	477	(Germany) Andre Sommerberg	4–5
(Germany) Pixum CFN Team Adrenalin Motorsport	BMW M3 E90	701	(Germany) Danny Brink	All
(Germany) Pixum CFN Team Adrenalin Motorsport	BMW M3 E90	701	(Germany) Philipp Leisen	All
(Germany) Pixum CFN Team Adrenalin Motorsport	BMW M3 E90	701	(Germany) Christopher Rink	All
(Germany) Pixum CFN Team Adrenalin Motorsport	BMW M3 E90	702	(Italy) Giacomo Altoè	2–3
(Germany) Pixum CFN Team Adrenalin Motorsport	BMW M3 E90	702	(Italy) Andrea Caldarelli	2–3
(Germany) Team AVIA Sorg Rennsport	BMW 325i	705	(United Kingdom) Moran Gott	1
(Germany) Team AVIA Sorg Rennsport	BMW 325i	705	(Germany) Torsten Kratz	1
(Germany) Team AVIA Sorg Rennsport	BMW 325i	705	(Germany) Moritz Oberheim	1
	BMW 325i	707	(Germany) Oliver Frisse	1–2, 4–5
	BMW 325i	707	(Germany) Florian Quante	1–2, 4–5
	BMW 325i	707	(Germany) Stephan Köpple	1–2
	BMW 325i	707	(Germany) Maximilian Hackländer	5
	BMW 325i	708	(Italy) Daniel Fink	5
	BMW 325i	708	(Italy) Florian Haller	5
	BMW 325i	708	(Austria) David Lanthaler	5
	BMW 325i	708	(Switzerland) Johannes Weger	5
	BMW 325i	710	(Italy) Florian Haller	4
	BMW 325i	710	(Germany) Marc Riebel	4
	BMW 325i	710	(Germany) Sarah Ganser	4
	BMW 325i	712	(Germany) Alexander Kroker	1–2, 4
	BMW 325i	712	(Germany) Jörg Schönfelder	1, 5
	BMW 325i	712	(Germany) Christian Schotte	2, 4–5
	BMW 325i	712	(Germany) Serge Van Vooren	5
	BMW 325i	713	(Germany) Christian Schotte	1
	BMW 325i	713	(Germany) Jörg Schönfelder	4
	BMW 325i	713	(Germany) Serge Van Vooren	4
	BMW 325i	713	(Germany) Hans Winkler	4
(Germany) Stein Tveten Motorsport	BMW 325i	716	(Germany) Stein Tveten	All
(Germany) Stein Tveten Motorsport	BMW 325i	716	(Germany) Tobias Dauenhauer	5
(Belgium) Pieter Denys	BMW 325i	721	(Belgium) Pieter Denys	2–3, 5
(Belgium) Pieter Denys	BMW 325i	721	(Belgium) Gregory Eyckmans	2–3, 5
(Germany) ePS-Rennsport	BMW 325i	722	(Germany) Klaus-Dieter Frommer	4
(Germany) ePS-Rennsport	BMW 325i	722	(Germany) Thomas Ardelt	4
(Germany) ePS-Rennsport	BMW 325i	722	(Germany) Carsten Welschar	4
(Germany) Keeevin Sports & Racing	BMW M3 E90	730	(Sweden) Dan Berghult	All
(Germany) Keeevin Sports & Racing	BMW M3 E90	730	(Switzerland) Juha Miettinen	All
(Germany) Keeevin Sports & Racing	BMW M3 E90	730	(Estonia) Roul Liidemann	2
(Germany) Keeevin Sports & Racing	BMW M3 E90	730	(Germany) Andrew Engelmann	4–5
	BMW 325i	733	(Germany) Jan Buchwald	All
	BMW 325i	733	(Germany) Tobias Vazquez-Garcia	All
	BMW 325i	733	(Germany) Marco-Andre Roloff	All
(Germany) rent2drive-FAMILIA-racing	BMW 325i	737	(Italy) Maurizio Ceresoli	1
(Germany) rent2drive-FAMILIA-racing	BMW 325i	737	(Netherlands) Jos Menten	1
(Germany) rent2drive-FAMILIA-racing	BMW 325i	737	(Germany) Georg Arbinger	3, 5
(Germany) rent2drive-FAMILIA-racing	BMW 325i	737	(Germany) Oliver Greven	3
(Germany) rent2drive-FAMILIA-racing	BMW 325i	737	(Germany) David Ackermann	3
(Germany) rent2drive-FAMILIA-racing	BMW 325i	737	(Germany) Michael Küchenmeister	5
(Germany) rent2drive-FAMILIA-racing	BMW 325i	737	(Austria) Constantin Schöll	5
(Germany) rent2drive-FAMILIA-racing	BMW 325i	747	(Germany) Richard Gresek	1–3
(Germany) rent2drive-FAMILIA-racing	BMW 325i	747	(Germany) Moritz Gusenbauer	1–3
(Germany) rent2drive-FAMILIA-racing	BMW 325i	747	(Germany) Werner Gusenbauer	1–3
(Germany) SFG Schönau e.V. im ADAC	BMW 325i	740	(Germany) Dominik Schöning	All
(Germany) SFG Schönau e.V. im ADAC	BMW 325i	740	(Germany) Roman Schiemenz	All
	BMW 325i	743	(Italy) Lorenzo Medori	5
	BMW 325i	743	(Germany) Nico Möller	5
	BMW 325i	743	(Germany) Andrea Maselli	5
(Germany) MSC Adenau e. V. im ADAC	BMW 325i	744	(Germany) Jacob Erlbacher	All
(Germany) MSC Adenau e. V. im ADAC	BMW 325i	744	(Germany) Marc Roitzheim	All
(Germany) MSC Adenau e. V. im ADAC	BMW 325i	744	(Germany) John Lee Schambony	All
(Germany) Hofor Racing	BMW 325i	745	(Germany) Rolf Derscheid	2, 4–5
(Germany) Hofor Racing	BMW 325i	745	(Germany) Michael Flehmer	2, 5
(Germany) Hofor Racing	BMW 325i	745	(Germany) Zoran Radulovicz	4–5
	BMW 325i	746	(Germany) Manuel Dormagen	1
	BMW 325i	746	(Germany) Hans Klemens Eßmann	1
	BMW 325i	746	(Germany) Sven Oepen	1
	BMW 325i	748	(Germany) Christian-Alexander Dannesberger	1
	BMW 325i	748	(Germany) Uwe Stockhausen	1
	BMW 325i	749	(Germany) Christian Scherer	All
	BMW 325i	749	(Germany) Andreas Schmidt	All
	BMW 325i	750	(Germany) Jürgen Huber	All
	BMW 325i	750	(Germany) Simon Sagmeister	All
	BMW 325i	750	(Germany) Jacek Pydys	5
(Germany) Manheller Racing	BMW M3 E90	751	(Germany) Markus Fischer	1
(Germany) Manheller Racing	BMW M3 E90	751	(Argentina) Néstor Girolami	1
(Germany) Manheller Racing	BMW M3 E90	751	(Argentina) Esteban Guerrieri	1
	BMW L390	752	(United Kingdom) Will Tregurtha	2–4
	BMW L390	752	(United Kingdom) Graham Wilson	2–4
	BMW L390	752	(United Kingdom) Andrew Wolfe	2–4
(Germany) KKrämer Racing	BMW M3 E90	757	(Germany) Danny Lehner	1, 5
(Germany) KKrämer Racing	BMW M3 E90	757	(Germany) Jan-Boris Schmäing	1
(Germany) KKrämer Racing	BMW M3 E90	757	(Germany) Christian Schier	1
(Germany) KKrämer Racing	BMW M3 E90	757	(United Kingdom) Oliver Allwood	5
(Germany) KKrämer Racing	BMW M3 E90	757	(Germany) Yevgen Sokolovskiy	5
(Germany) MC Roetgen e.V	BMW 325i	777	(Germany) Daniel Jolk	4–5
(Germany) MC Roetgen e.V	BMW 325i	777	(Netherlands) Chris Rothoff	4–5
(Germany) MC Roetgen e.V	BMW 325i	777	(Germany) Sascha Korte	4
(Germany) MC Roetgen e.V	BMW 325i	777	(Germany) Nikolaus Schelle	5
	BMW M3 E90	780	(Germany) Thorsten Köppert	1, 5
	BMW M3 E90	780	(Germany) Ingo Oepen	1, 5
OPC
Team	Car	No.	Drivers	Events
(Germany) MSC Adenau e. V. im ADAC	Opel Astra OPC Cup	850	(Switzerland) Herbert Schmidt	1, 4–5
(Germany) MSC Adenau e. V. im ADAC	Opel Astra OPC Cup	850	(France) Jean-Philippe Imparato	1, 5
(Germany) MSC Adenau e. V. im ADAC	Opel Astra OPC Cup	850	(Portugal) Carlos Antunes Tavares Dias	1
(Germany) MSC Adenau e. V. im ADAC	Opel Astra OPC Cup	850	(France) Francois Wales	4
(Germany) MSC Adenau e. V. im ADAC	Opel Astra OPC Cup	850	(Germany) Tobias Jung	5
(Germany) Buttler-Pal Motorsport	Opel Astra OPC Cup	851	(Germany) René Buttler	5
(Germany) Buttler-Pal Motorsport	Opel Astra OPC Cup	851	(Germany) Marc Riebel	5
(Germany) Lubner Motorsport	Opel Astra OPC Cup	855	(Germany) Maximilian Günther	4
(Germany) Lubner Motorsport	Opel Astra OPC Cup	855	(Italy) Andrea Sabbatini	4
(Germany) Lubner Motorsport	Opel Astra OPC Cup	855	(Germany) Philipp Walsdorf	4
(Germany) Automobilclub von Deutschland	Opel Astra OPC Cup	856	(Germany) Lena Strycek	2, 5
(Germany) Automobilclub von Deutschland	Opel Astra OPC Cup	856	(Germany) Robin Strycek	2, 5
(Germany) Automobilclub von Deutschland	Opel Astra OPC Cup	856	(Germany) Volker Strycek	2, 5
Cup X
Team	Car	No.	Drivers	Events
(Germany) Teichmann Racing	KTM X-Bow GT4	927	(Germany) Stephan Brodmerkel	1–3, 5
(Germany) Teichmann Racing	KTM X-Bow GT4	927	(Germany) Michael Mönch	1–3, 5
(Germany) Teichmann Racing	KTM X-Bow GT4	927	(Germany) Hendrik Still	1
(Germany) Teichmann Racing	KTM X-Bow GT4	927	(Greece) Ercan Kara Osman	2, 4
(Germany) Teichmann Racing	KTM X-Bow GT4	927	(Austria) Karl Heinz Teichmann	3, 5
(Germany) Teichmann Racing	KTM X-Bow GT4	927	(Austria) Laura Kraihamer	4
(Germany) Teichmann Racing	KTM X-Bow GT4	927	(Germany) Maik Rönnefarth	4
(Germany) Teichmann Racing	KTM X-Bow GT4	927	(Germany) Tom Leswal	5
(Germany) Teichmann Racing	KTM X-Bow GT4	928	(Germany) Stephan Brodmerkel	4
(Germany) Teichmann Racing	KTM X-Bow GT4	928	(Germany) Tom Leswal	4
(Germany) Teichmann Racing	KTM X-Bow GT4	929	(Germany) Maik Rönnefarth	1–3, 5
(Germany) Teichmann Racing	KTM X-Bow GT4	929	(Germany) 'Jens'	1–2
(Germany) Teichmann Racing	KTM X-Bow GT4	929	(Germany) 'Max'	1–2
(Germany) Teichmann Racing	KTM X-Bow GT4	929	(Greece) Ercan Kara Osman	3, 5
(Germany) Teichmann Racing	KTM X-Bow GT4	929	(Germany) Hendrik Still	5
(Germany) Teichmann Racing	KTM X-Bow GT4	930	(Germany) Georg Griesemann	All
(Germany) Teichmann Racing	KTM X-Bow GT4	930	(Austria) Reinhard Kofler	All
(Germany) Teichmann Racing	KTM X-Bow GT4	930	(Greece) Ercan Kara Osman	1
(Germany) Teichmann Racing	KTM X-Bow GT4	930	(Germany) Yves Volte	5
Cup 3
Team	Car	No.	Drivers	Events
(Germany) Schmickler Performance	Porsche 718 Cayman GT4 Clubsport	917	(Germany) Kai Riemer	2, 4–5
(Germany) Schmickler Performance	Porsche 718 Cayman GT4 Clubsport	917	(Germany) Horst Baumann	2, 5
(Germany) Schmickler Performance	Porsche 718 Cayman GT4 Clubsport	917	(Switzerland) Ivan Jacoma	4–5
(Germany) JS Competition	Porsche Cayman GT4 Clubsport MR	940	(Germany) Heinz Dolfen	1, 3
(Germany) JS Competition	Porsche Cayman GT4 Clubsport MR	940	(Germany) Jonas Spölgen	1
(Germany) JS Competition	Porsche Cayman GT4 Clubsport MR	940	(Germany) Philipp Weber	3
(Germany) Team AVIA Sorg Rennsport	Porsche 718 Cayman GT4 Clubsport	949	(Germany) Stefan Beyer	1–2, 4–5
(Germany) Team AVIA Sorg Rennsport	Porsche 718 Cayman GT4 Clubsport	949	(Germany) Torsten Kratz	1–2, 4–5
(Germany) Team AVIA Sorg Rennsport	Porsche 718 Cayman GT4 Clubsport	949	(Germany) Friedhelm Mihm	1–2, 4–5
(Germany) Black Falcon Team TEXTAR	Porsche Cayman GT4 Clubsport MR	950	(Germany) Alexander Böhm	4
(Germany) Black Falcon Team TEXTAR	Porsche Cayman GT4 Clubsport MR	950	(Germany) Christian Reiter	4
(Germany) Black Falcon Team TEXTAR	Porsche Cayman GT4 Clubsport MR	950	(Germany) 'Iceman'	4
(Germany) Black Falcon Team TEXTAR	Porsche Cayman GT4 Clubsport MR	950	(Turkey) Ersin Yücesan	4
(Germany) EPS- RENNSPORT	Porsche 718 Cayman GT4 Clubsport	951	(Germany) Patrick Steuer	2–3
(Germany) EPS- RENNSPORT	Porsche 718 Cayman GT4 Clubsport	951	(Germany) Mark Wallenwein	2–3
(Germany) Team Mathol Racing e.V.	Porsche 718 Cayman GT4 Clubsport	955	(Switzerland) Rüdiger Schicht	1–2, 4–5
(Germany) Team Mathol Racing e.V.	Porsche 718 Cayman GT4 Clubsport	955	(Germany) 'Montana'	1–2, 4–5
(Germany) Team Mathol Racing e.V.	Porsche 718 Cayman GT4 Clubsport	955	(Luxembourg) Daniel Bohr	1
(Germany) Team Mathol Racing e.V.	Porsche 718 Cayman GT4 Clubsport	955	(Germany) Timo Mölig	4
(Germany) Team Mathol Racing e.V.	Porsche 718 Cayman GT4 Clubsport	955	(Germany) Arne Hoffmeister	5
(Germany) Team Mathol Racing e.V.	Porsche 718 Cayman GT4 Clubsport	966	(Luxembourg) Daniel Bohr	2–5
(Germany) Team Mathol Racing e.V.	Porsche 718 Cayman GT4 Clubsport	966	(Germany) Timo Mölig	2–5
(Germany) Hella Pagid - racing one	Porsche Cayman GT4 Clubsport MR	957	(United Kingdom) Bradley Ellis	5
(Germany) Hella Pagid - racing one	Porsche Cayman GT4 Clubsport MR	957	(Germany) Klaus Halsig	5
(Germany) W&S Motorsport	Porsche Cayman GT4 Clubsport MR	959	(Germany) Jürgen Vöhringer	1, 4–5
(Germany) W&S Motorsport	Porsche Cayman GT4 Clubsport MR	959	(Germany) Michael Joos	1, 5
(Germany) W&S Motorsport	Porsche Cayman GT4 Clubsport MR	959	(Germany) Walter Schweikart	4
(Germany) W&S Motorsport	Porsche Cayman GT4 Clubsport MR	959	(France) Sébastien Perrot	5
(Germany) Frikadelli Racing Team	Porsche 718 Cayman GT4 Clubsport	962	(Germany) Hendrik von Danwitz	1–3, 5
(Germany) Frikadelli Racing Team	Porsche 718 Cayman GT4 Clubsport	962	(Germany) 'Jules'	1–3, 5
(Germany) FK Performance Motorsport	Porsche Cayman GT4 Clubsport MR	975	(Switzerland) Patrick Grütter	4–5
(Germany) FK Performance Motorsport	Porsche Cayman GT4 Clubsport MR	975	(Germany) Alexander Rappold	4
(Germany) FK Performance Motorsport	Porsche Cayman GT4 Clubsport MR	975	(Germany) Fabio Grosse	5
(Germany) FK Performance Motorsport	Porsche 718 Cayman GT4 Clubsport	976	(Germany) Fabio Grosse	All
(Germany) FK Performance Motorsport	Porsche 718 Cayman GT4 Clubsport	976	(Germany) Jens Moetefindt	All
(Germany) FK Performance Motorsport	Porsche 718 Cayman GT4 Clubsport	976	(Germany) Thorsten Wolter	All
(Germany) FK Performance Motorsport	Porsche 718 Cayman GT4 Clubsport	976	(Germany) Patrick Hinte	5
(Germany) KKrämer Racing	Porsche 718 Cayman GT4 Clubsport	977	(Germany) Karsten Krämer	All
(Germany) KKrämer Racing	Porsche 718 Cayman GT4 Clubsport	977	(Germany) Heiko Tönges	All
(Germany) KKrämer Racing	Porsche 718 Cayman GT4 Clubsport	977	(Germany) Henning Cramer	1
(Germany) KKrämer Racing	Porsche 718 Cayman GT4 Clubsport	977	(Germany) Steffen Höber	2–3
(Germany) KKrämer Racing	Porsche 718 Cayman GT4 Clubsport	977	(Germany) Sascha Kloft	4–5
(Germany) KKrämer Racing	Porsche 718 Cayman GT4 Clubsport	977	(Russia) Alexey Veremenko	5
(Germany) KKrämer Racing	Porsche Cayman GT4 Clubsport MR	978	(Germany) Henning Cramer	1, 5
(Germany) KKrämer Racing	Porsche Cayman GT4 Clubsport MR	978	(Germany) Sascha Kloft	1
(Germany) KKrämer Racing	Porsche Cayman GT4 Clubsport MR	978	(Germany) Yevgen Sokolovskiy	2–4
(Germany) KKrämer Racing	Porsche Cayman GT4 Clubsport MR	978	(Germany) Jan-Boris Schmäing	2
(Germany) KKrämer Racing	Porsche Cayman GT4 Clubsport MR	978	(Germany) Paul Fatyuschin	2
(Germany) KKrämer Racing	Porsche Cayman GT4 Clubsport MR	978	(Germany) Danny Hirschauer	3–4
(Germany) KKrämer Racing	Porsche Cayman GT4 Clubsport MR	978	(Germany) Armin Baumann	5
(Germany) KKrämer Racing	Porsche Cayman GT4 Clubsport MR	978	(Germany) Karsten Krämer	5
(Germany) KKrämer Racing	Porsche Cayman GT4 Clubsport MR	978	(United States) Andreas Gabler	5
(Belgium) Mühlner Motorsport	Porsche 718 Cayman GT4 Clubsport	979	(Germany) Thorsten Jung	All
(Belgium) Mühlner Motorsport	Porsche 718 Cayman GT4 Clubsport	979	(Germany) Moritz Kranz	1–4
(Belgium) Mühlner Motorsport	Porsche 718 Cayman GT4 Clubsport	979	(Germany) Peter Terting	1–3, 5
(Belgium) Mühlner Motorsport	Porsche 718 Cayman GT4 Clubsport	979	(Germany) 'Max'	4
(Belgium) Mühlner Motorsport	Porsche 718 Cayman GT4 Clubsport	979	(Norway) Oskar Sandberg	5

== Results ==
Results indicates overall winner only in the whole race.

Rnd	Circuit	Pole position	Winners
1	(Germany) Nürburgring Nordschleife	(Germany) No. 6 Mercedes-AMG Team HRT	(Germany) No. 34 Walkenhorst Motorsport
1	(Germany) Nürburgring Nordschleife	(Germany) Patrick Assenheimer (Germany) Maro Engel	(Denmark) Mikkel Jensen (Norway) Christian Krognes (United Kingdom) David Pittard
2	(Germany) Nürburgring Nordschleife	(Germany) No. 42 BMW Team Schnitzer	(Germany) No. 16 Mercedes-AMG Team HRT
2	(Germany) Nürburgring Nordschleife	(Brazil) Augusto Farfus (Germany) Martin Tomczyk (South Africa) Sheldon van der Linde	(United Kingdom) Adam Christodoulou (Germany) Maro Engel (Germany) Manuel Metzger (Germany) Luca Stolz
3	(Germany) Nürburgring Nordschleife	(Germany) No. 16 Mercedes-AMG Team HRT	(Germany) No. 16 Mercedes-AMG Team HRT
3	(Germany) Nürburgring Nordschleife	(United Kingdom) Adam Christodoulou (Germany) Maro Engel (Germany) Manuel Metzger (Germany) Luca Stolz	(United Kingdom) Adam Christodoulou (Germany) Maro Engel (Germany) Manuel Metzger (Germany) Luca Stolz
4	(Germany) Nürburgring Nordschleife	(Germany) No. 23 Mercedes-AMG Team GetSpeed	(Germany) No. 99 ROWE Racing
4	(Germany) Nürburgring Nordschleife	(United States) Janine Hill (Germany) Fabian Schiller (United States) John Shoffner	(Netherlands) Nick Catsburg (Netherlands) Stef Dusseldorp
5	(Germany) Nürburgring Nordschleife	(Germany) No. 29 Audi Sport Team	(Germany) No. 29 Audi Sport Team
5	(Germany) Nürburgring Nordschleife	(Italy) Mattia Drudi (Germany) Christopher Mies (South Africa) Kelvin van der Linde	(Italy) Mattia Drudi (Germany) Christopher Mies (South Africa) Kelvin van der Linde

=== Championship standings ===
Pos.	Drivers	Team	NÜR1	NÜR2	NÜR3	NÜR4	NÜR5	Pts
SP9 Pro
1	(United Kingdom) David Pittard	(Germany) Walkenhorst Motorsport	1	2	3	2	8	42.69
2	(Norway) Dennis Olsen	(Germany) Falken Motorsports	8					30.94
2	(Norway) Dennis Olsen	(Hong Kong) KCMG		10	8	4	9	30.94
3	(Germany) Maro Engel	(Germany) Mercedes-AMG Team HRT	2	1	1		Ret	28.13
4	(Denmark) Mikkel Jensen	(Germany) Walkenhorst Motorsport	1	2		2		27.13
5	(Germany) Markus Winkelhock	(Germany) Audi Sport Team			2	5	2	26.37
6	(Norway) Christian Krognes	(Germany) Walkenhorst Motorsport		2	3	2		26.26
7	(Italy) Mattia Drudi	(Germany) Audi Sport Team		14	5	5	1	25.67
8	(Germany) Maximilian Buhk (Germany) Fabian Schiller	(Germany) Mercedes-AMG Team GetSpeed	3	3			4	25.02
10	(Italy) Raffaele Marciello	(Germany) Mercedes-AMG Team GetSpeed	3		4		4	24.43
SP9 Pro-Am
1	(Germany) Marco Holzer (Germany) Patrick Kolb (Italy) Lorenzo Rocco di Torrepadula	(Germany) Huber Motorsport	3	1	1	1	3	26.25
4	(Germany) Klaus Abbelen (Germany) Lance David Arnold (Switzerland) Alex Müller	(Germany) Frikadelli Racing Team	1	2	Ret		1	19.58
7	(France) Emmanuel Collard (France) François Perrodo	(Germany) Mercedes-AMG Team GetSpeed	2		2			11.25
9	(Germany) Elia Erhart (Germany) Pierre Kaffer (Austria) Simon Reicher	(Germany) EFP Car Collection by TECE	4				2	6.25
9	(France) Matthieu Vaxivière	(Germany) Mercedes-AMG Team GetSpeed	2					6.25
	(Germany) Felipe Fernández Laser	(Germany) Frikadelli Racing Team			Ret			0
SP9 Am
1	(Germany) Christian Kohlhaas	(Germany) Racing One	1	1	DNS	2	1	33
2	(Switzerland) Nikolaj Rogivue	(Germany) Racing One	1	1	DNS		1	26.75
3	(Germany) Rudi Adams (Germany) Michael Heimrich (Germany) Arno Klasen	(Netherlands) Team Équipe-Vitesse	2	Ret	1	3	2	25.33
6	(Germany) Stephan Köhler	(Germany) Racing One	1	1				17.75
7	(United States) Janine Hill	(Germany) Mercedes-AMG Team GetSpeed	3	DNS		1	4	15.5
8	(Germany) Christian Bollrath (Germany) Bernhard Henzel	(Germany) RaceIng - powered by HFG		4	2		3	13
10	(United States) John Shoffner	(Germany) Mercedes-AMG Team GetSpeed	3	DNS		1		12.5
SPX
1	(Germany) Rudi Adams (Germany) Michael Heimrich (Germany) Arno Klasen	(United States) Scuderia Cameron Glickenhaus					1	5
SP7
1	(Germany) Marcel Hoppe	(Belgium) Mühlner Motorsport	1	2	1	1	5	38.7
2	(Germany) Moritz Kranz	(Belgium) Mühlner Motorsport	1	2	1	1		35.13
3	(Czech Republic) Milan Kodidek		3	3	3	2	2	33.45
4	(Germany) Peter Terting	(Belgium) Mühlner Motorsport	1	2	1		5	29.53
5	(Germany) Nico Menzel (Germany) Philipp Neuffer (Germany) Johannes Stengel	(Belgium) Huber Motorsport	2	1	2	Ret	Ret	24.53
8	(United States) Bill Cameron			4	5	4	1	21.2
9	(Germany) Bob Wilwert		3		3	2		19.76
10	(United States) Jim Cameron			4	5		1	17.3
SP8
1	(Denmark) Henrik Bollerslev (Germany) Niklas Kry	(Germany) Giti Tire Motorsport by WS Racing	1	1	1	1	1	30.83
3	(Germany) Carrie Schreiner	(Germany) Giti Tire Motorsport by WS Racing	1	1	1		1	25.83
4	(Germany) Guido Wirtz	(Germany) Giti Tire Motorsport by WS Racing					1	5
4	(Denmark) Alexander Mohr (Germany) Klaus Völker	(Germany) Novel Racing with Toyo Tire by Ring Racing		2	Ret			5
4	(Germany) Dominik Farnbacher	(Germany) Novel Racing with Toyo Tire by Ring Racing		2				5
	(Germany) Jürgen Gagstatter (Germany) Jens Ludmann (Germany) Stephan Wölflick			Ret				0
	(Germany) Uwe Kleen	(Germany) Novel Racing with Toyo Tire by Ring Racing			Ret			0
SP8T
1	(Germany) Stephan Rösler (Estonia) Tristan Viidas	(Germany) Black Falcon Team TEXTAR	1	1	1		1	30.83
3	(Germany) Marco Müller	(Germany) Black Falcon Team TEXTAR			1		1	16.79
4	(United Kingdom) Dan Harper (Germany) Max Hesse (Germany) Neil Verhagen	(Germany) FK Performance Motorsport	Ret					11.25
4	(United Kingdom) Dan Harper (Germany) Max Hesse (Germany) Neil Verhagen	(Germany) Walkenhorst Motorsport				2	4	11.25
7	(Germany) Phil Hill (Denmark) Kaj Schubert	(Germany) Hanger Zero by J.v.O. Autosport				3	3	10.18
9	(Germany) 'Max'	(Germany) Black Falcon Team TEXTAR					1	9.29
10	(United Kingdom) Chris Goodwin (Sweden) Alexander West	(United Kingdom) Garage 59				4	2	9.11
SP10
1	(Germany) Yannick Fübrich (Austria) David Griessner (Germany) Florian Naumann	(Germany) Pixum CFN Team Adrenalin Motorsport	2	1	2	1	1	44.22
4	(Austria) Michael Fischer (Italy) Gabriele Piana (Germany) Michael Schrey	(Germany) Hofor Racing by Bonk Motorsport	1	3	1	3	Ret	32.07
7	(Germany) Daniel Blickle (Germany) Der Bommel (Germany) Niklas Steinhaus	(Germany) W&S Motorsport	4	4	3	5	2	29.57
10	(Germany) Christian Konnerth (Bulgaria) Pavel Lefterov (Germany) Nico Otto	(Germany) FK Performance Motorsport	3	2	Ret	2	Ret	22.87
Cup 2
1	(Germany) Georg Goder (Germany) Martin Schlüter	(Germany) 9und11 Racing Team		2	1	DNS	1	12.5
3	(Germany) Tim Scheerbarth	(Germany) 9und11 Racing Team			1		1	10
4	(Germany) Alex Autumn (Germany) Marc Hennerici			1		DNS		7.5
5	(Germany) Dirk Leßmeister	(Germany) 9und11 Racing Team					1	5
7	(Germany) Ralf Oehme	(Germany) 9und11 Racing Team		2		DNS		2.5
SP6
1	(Germany) Marcus Schmickler (Germany) Achim Wawer					1	1	12.5
1	(Germany) Volker Wawer			1		1		12.5
4	(Germany) David Ackermann	(Germany) rent2drive-FAMILIA-racing	1	Ret		2		7.5
4	(Germany) Stefan Schmickler			1				7.5
6	(Germany) Jörg Wiskirchen	(Germany) rent2drive-FAMILIA-racing	1	Ret				5
6	(Germany) Stefan Müller	(Germany) rent2drive-FAMILIA-racing	1					5
8	(Germany) Winfried Assmann (Hungary) Csaba Walter	(Germany) rent2drive-FAMILIA-racing				2		2.5
	(Germany) Carsten Welschar	(Germany) rent2drive-FAMILIA-racing		Ret				0
SP5
1	(Germany) Lucian Gavris (Germany) Tim Schrick					1	1	10
SP4
1	(Germany) Uwe Stockhausen					1	1	15
2	(Germany) Thomas Ardelt (Germany) Christian Dannesberger (Germany) Henning Deuster	(Germany) ePS-Rennsport		1				7.5
2	(Germany) Herrmann Kahrs					1		7.5
2	(Germany) NexD e.K. (Germany) Stephan-Wilhelm Schroers (Germany) Wilfried Selbach						1	7.5
2	(Germany) Jonas Spölgen	(Germany) JS Competition	1				2	7.5
10	(Belgium) Steven Maris	(Germany) JS Competition	1					5
10	(Germany) Daniel Odenthal (Germany) Julian Odenthal (Germany) David Von Der Mark			Ret	1			5
14	(Germany) Uwe Stein	(Germany) JS Competition				Ret	2	2.5
14	(Germany) Axel Wiegner	(Germany) JS Competition					2	2.5
	(Germany) Olaf Hoppelshäuser	(Germany) JS Competition				Ret		0
SP4T
1	(Germany) Ralf Zensen					1	1	15
2	(Germany) Olivier Louisoder (Germany) Klaus Müller (Germany) Fabian Peitzmeier						1	7.5
5	(Germany) Alexander Köppen (Netherlands) Klaus Müller (Luxembourg) Alain Pier					1		5
	(Germany) Peter Bonk (Netherlands) Marco van Ramshorst		Ret				Ret	0
SP3
1	(Belgium) Olivier Muytjens	(Belgium) Pit Lane - AMC Sankt Vith	3	1	1	1	1	35.83
1	(Belgium) Jacques Derenne	(Belgium) Pit Lane - AMC Sankt Vith	2	1	2	1	1	35.83
3	(Belgium) 'Brody'	(Belgium) Pit Lane - AMC Sankt Vith	2	3	1	1	1	34.16
4	(Belgium) Tom Cloet	(Belgium) Pit Lane - AMC Sankt Vith	2	1	1			30.83
5	(Germany) Alexander Müller	(Belgium) Pit Lane - AMC Sankt Vith	3	3	2	2	2	30.83
6	(Germany) Lucian Gavris (Germany) Tim Schrick		1	Ret	DNS			8.33
8	(Germany) 'Calimero'	(Germany) Team 9 und 11		2		Ret	3	30.83
9	(Switzerland) Manuel Amweg (Germany) Oliver Sprungmann	(Belgium) Pit Lane - AMC Sankt Vith					2	5
SP3T
1	(Germany) Hermann Bock	(Germany) Bonk Motorsport		1	2	3	3	30.27
2	(Germany) Jörg Kittelmann (Germany) Wolfgang Weber	(Germany) Team Mathol Racing e.V.	1	3	Ret	5	4	25.21
4	(Germany) Michael Bonk	(Germany) Bonk Motorsport		1	2	3		23.39
5	(Germany) Andreas Gülden (Germany) Benjamin Leuchter (Switzerland) Jasmin Preisig	(Germany) Max Kruse Racing				1	1	18.82
8	(Denmark) Kristian Jepsen (Denmark) Jan Sorensen	(Germany) MSC Sinzig e.V. im ADAC		2	3		5	16.88
10	(Netherlands) Tom Coronel	(Germany) Max Kruse Racing				2	2	16.46
SP-PRO
1	(Germany) Marek Böckmann (Germany) Tobias Müller (Luxembourg) Carlos Rivas	(Germany) Black Falcon	1	1	1	1	1	20
4	(Germany) Maik Rosenberg	(Germany) Black Falcon					1	5
SP2T
1	(Switzerland) Bernhard Badertscher (Switzerland) Max Langenegger	(Switzerland) Team Rallye Top	Ret			Ret	1	10
V6
1	(Spain) Carlos Arimón Solivellas (Germany) Christian Büllesbach (Germany) Ulrich Korn (Germany) Carlos Rivas	(Germany) Pixum CFN Team Adrenalin Motorsport	1	2	1	1	1	30
5	(Germany) Mike Beckhusen (France) Jules Gounon	(Germany) Team Mathol Racing e.V.		1				8.33
7	(Switzerland) Andreas Renk (Germany) Martin Meenen	(Germany) Black Falcon Team TEXTAR	2					2.5
	(Germany) Anna Lena Binkowska (Germany) David Binkowska (Germany) Dietmar Binkowska						DSQ	0
V5
1	(Germany) Norbert Fischer (Norway) Oskar Sandberg (Germany) Ulrich Korn	(Germany) Pixum CFN Team Adrenalin Motorsport	1	1	4	1	1	38.79
4	(Switzerland) Mauro Calamia (Italy) Roberto Pampanini	(Germany) W&S Motorsport		4	2			19.5
4	(Switzerland) Mauro Calamia (Italy) Roberto Pampanini	(Germany) FK Performance Motorsport					2	19.5
6	(Germany) Leonard Oehme	(Germany) 9und11 Racing Team	3	2	3	Ret	3	17.86
7	(Germany) Dennis Fetzer (Germany) Maximilian Koch	(Germany) PROsport Racing		5	1			12.57
9	(Denmark) Kaj Schubert		4	3	5			10.43
10	(Germany) Niklas Oehme (Germany) Ralf Oehme	(Germany) 9und11 Racing Team	3		3		3	10
VT3
1	(Germany) Alex Fielenbach (Germany) Wolfgang Weber	(Germany) Team Mathol Racing e.V.	1	1	1	1	1	28.33
3	(Germany) Mike Beckhusen	(Germany) Team Mathol Racing e.V.		1	1			13.33
4	(Germany) Kim Berwanger			2				13.33
4	(Germany) Kim Berwanger	(Germany) Team Mathol Racing e.V.					1	13.33
5	(France) Jules Gounon	(Germany) Team Mathol Racing e.V.		1	1			8.33
6	(Germany) Reinhold Renger	(Germany) Team Mathol Racing e.V.					1	5
6	(Germany) Alexander Köppen (Germany) Erich Zanders			2				5
	(Germany) Steven Fürsch (Germany) Fabian Peitzmeier (Germany) Ralf Zensen		DNS	Ret				0
	(Netherlands) Patrick Huisman			Ret				0
	(Germany) Jürgen Bretschneider		DNS					0
VT2
1	(Switzerland) Robert van Husen	(Germany) Pixum CFN Team Adrenalin Motorsport	9	3	5	4	2	38.06
2	(Germany) Carsten Knechtges (Germany) Marcel Manheller (Germany) Janis Waldow	(Germany) Manheller Racing	1	Ret	2	2	1	37.53
5	(Germany) Christopher Rink (Germany) Philipp Stahlschmidt	(Germany) Pixum CFN Team Adrenalin Motorsport	4	1	1	1	Ret	37.25
7	(Italy) Eduardo Bugane	(Germany) Pixum CFN Team Adrenalin Motorsport	9	3	5		2	30.25
8	(Germany) Martin Owen (Germany) Kurt Strube	(Germany) Manheller Racing	8	6	8	7	8	29.06
10	(Germany) Timo Hochwind (Germany) Michael Paatz	(Germany) Manheller Racing	2	2	3	Ret	Ret	26.77
V2
1	(Germany) Manfred Schmitz (Germany) Reiner Thomas			1	1	1		10
M2 CS
1	(Finland) Sami-Matti Trogen (Germany) Mario von Bohlen und Halbach	(Germany) Walkenhorst Motorsport		1	1			10
H4
1	(Germany) Bernd Kleeschulte	(Germany) Pixum CFN Team Adrenalin Motorsport	1	1	1	1		22.5
2	(Germany) Carsten Welschar	(Germany) Pixum CFN Team Adrenalin Motorsport				1		5
	(Germany) Robin Chrzanowski (Germany) Kersten Jodexnis	(Germany) clickversicherung.de Team				Ret		0
H2
1	(Germany) Michael Bohrer (Germany) Stephan Epp (Germany) Gerrit Holthaus	(Germany) AVIA Racing	2	2	1	1	2	41.95
4	(Germany) Timo Beuth (Germany) Stephan Ernst	(Germany) Scuderia Colonia e.V. im ADAC	3	4	4	2		24.09
6	(Germany) Michael Uelwer (Germany) Andreas Winterwerber (Germany) Marc Wylach		Ret	3	2	5	3	23.78
9	(Germany) Olaf Beckmann (Germany) Peter Hassr (Germany) Volker Strycek	(Germany) Automobilclub von Deutschland	1	1	Ret	Ret		18.67
AT(-G)
1	(Germany) Ralph Caba (Germany) Oliver Sprungmann		DSQ	1	1	1		17.5
3	(Germany) Michael Bernd Schmidt	(Germany) Four Motors Bioconcept-Car	1				1	15
4	(Germany) Matthias Beckwermert (Switzerland) Marco Timbal	(Germany) Four Motors Bioconcept-Car	1			Ret	2	10
6	(Germany) Thomas Kiefer (Germany) 'Tom'	(Germany) Four Motors Bioconcept-Car				Ret	1	7.5
6	(Luxembourg) Charles Kauffman	(Germany) Four Motors Bioconcept-Car					1	7.5
9	(Denmark) Henrik Bollerslev	(Germany) Four Motors Bioconcept-Car					2	2.5
Cup 5
1	(Germany) Marcel Marchewicz (Germany) Tim Neuser	(Germany) Schnitzelalm Racing	2	4	3	3	3	39.4
3	(Germany) Yannick Fübrich (Austria) David Griessner (Italy) Francesco Merlini (Norway) Sindre Setsaas	(Germany) Pixum CFN Team Adrenalin Motorsport	1	2	2	2	8	39.01
7	(Germany) Heiko Eichenberg (Germany) Moritz Oberheim	(Germany) Team AVIA Sorg Rennsport	3	1	Ret	1	1	36.63
9	(Germany) Roland Froese	(Germany) Pixum CFN Team Adrenalin Motorsport	5	3	9	8	5	36.63
10	(Germany) Stefan Kruse (Germany) Philipp Leisen (Norway) Einar Thorsen	(Germany) Pixum CFN Team Adrenalin Motorsport	4	10	7	7	4	25.14
V4
1	(Germany) Danny Brink (Germany) Philipp Leisen (Germany) Christopher Rink	(Germany) Pixum CFN Team Adrenalin Motorsport	1	1	1	1	1	48.39
4	(Germany) Jacob Erlbacher (Germany) Marc Roitzheim (Germany) John Lee Schambony	(Germany) MSC Adenau e. V. im ADAC	2	2	2	Ret	4	34.97
7	(Germany) Jürgen Huber (Germany) Simon Sagmeister		2	2	2	Ret	4	28.37
9	(Germany) Rolf Derscheid	(Germany) Hofor Racing		4		3	3	24.88
10	(Germany) Christian Scherer (Germany) Andreas Schmidt		Ret	3	4	Ret	2	24.36
OPC
1	(Germany) Lena Strycek (Germany) Robin Strycek (Germany) Volker Strycek	(Germany) Automobilclub von Deutschland		1			1	13.33
4	(Germany) Herbert Schmidt	(Germany) MSC Adenau e. V. im ADAC	1			2	2	12.5
5	(France) Jean-Philippe Imparato	(Germany) MSC Adenau e. V. im ADAC	1				2	10
6	(Germany) Maximilian Günther (Italy) Andrea Sabbatini (Germany) Philipp Walsdorf	(Germany) Lubner Motorsport				1		7.5
9	(Portugal) Carlos Antunes Tavares Dias	(Germany) MSC Adenau e. V. im ADAC	1					5
9	(Germany) Tobias Jung	(Germany) MSC Adenau e. V. im ADAC					2	5
11	(France) Francois Wales	(Germany) MSC Adenau e. V. im ADAC				2		2.5
12	(Germany) René Buttler (Germany) Marc Riebel	(Germany) Buttler-Pal Motorsport					3	1.67
Pos.	Drivers	Team	NÜR1	NÜR2	NÜR3	NÜR4	NÜR5	Pts

== See also ==
- 2020 24 Hours of Nürburgring

== Bibliography ==
- KS Media (Patrik Koziolek & Thorsten Schlottmann) (21 December 2020). Nürburgring Langstrecken-Serie 2020. Gruppe C Motorsport Verlag. ISBN 978-3-948501-08-2.
