= 2017 TCR Series seasons =

TCR touring car series seasons

This article describes some of the 2017 seasons of TCR Series across the world.

== VLN TCR Class ==
The 2017 Veranstaltergemeinschaft Langstreckenpokal Nürburgring TCR Class was the first season for the TCR Class in the championship.

=== Teams and drivers ===
Team	Car	No.	Drivers	Rounds
(Germany) Bonk Motorsport	Peugeot 308 Racing Cup TCR	308	(Germany) Jürgen Nett	1–9
(Germany) Bonk Motorsport	Peugeot 308 Racing Cup TCR	308	(Germany) Joachim Nett	1–9
(Germany) Bonk Motorsport	Peugeot 308 Racing Cup TCR	308	(United Kingdom) Bradley Philpot	1–9
(Germany) Bonk Motorsport	Audi RS3 LMS TCR	810	(Germany) Hermann Bock	2–3, 5, 7-9
(Germany) Bonk Motorsport	Audi RS3 LMS TCR	810	(Germany) Max Partl	2*
(Germany) Bonk Motorsport	Audi RS3 LMS TCR	810	(Germany) Rainer Partl	*
(Germany) Bonk Motorsport	Audi RS3 LMS TCR	810	(Germany) Jürgen Bretschneider	3, 7
(Germany) Bonk Motorsport	Audi RS3 LMS TCR	810	(Germany) Michael Bonk	8
(Germany) Bonk Motorsport	Audi RS3 LMS TCR	811	(Germany) Michael Bonk	2–4*
(Germany) Bonk Motorsport	Audi RS3 LMS TCR	811	(Germany) Volker Piepmeyer	2–4*
(Germany) Bonk Motorsport	Audi RS3 LMS TCR	811	(Germany) Axel Burghardt	*
(Germany) Bonk Motorsport	Audi RS3 LMS TCR	811	(Germany) Andreas Möntmann	*
(Norway) Møller Bil Motorsport	Audi RS3 LMS TCR	801	(Norway) Håkon Schjærin	1, 5–7, 9
(Norway) Møller Bil Motorsport	Audi RS3 LMS TCR	801	(Norway) Atle Gulbrandsen	1, 5–7, 9
(Norway) Møller Bil Motorsport	Audi RS3 LMS TCR	801	(Norway) Kenneth Østvold	1, 5–7, 9
(Norway) Møller Bil Motorsport	Audi RS3 LMS TCR	801	(Norway) Anders Lindstad	5
(Germany) Mathilda Racing	Volkswagen Golf GTi TCR	802	(Germany) Andreas Gülden	1–9*
(Germany) Mathilda Racing	Volkswagen Golf GTi TCR	802	(Germany) Benjamin Leuchter	1–9*
(Germany) Mathilda Racing	Volkswagen Golf GTi TCR	802	(Austria) Constantin Kletzer	3, 5*
(Germany) Mathilda Racing	Volkswagen Golf GTi TCR	802	(Germany) Dennis Wüsthoff	*
(Germany) Mathilda Racing	Volkswagen Golf GTi TCR	802	(Germany) Michael Schrey	9
(Germany) Mathilda Racing	Volkswagen Golf GTi TCR	804	(Germany) Michael Paatz	1–5, 7-9
(Germany) Mathilda Racing	Volkswagen Golf GTi TCR	804	(Germany) Lutz Marc Rühl	1–3
(Germany) Mathilda Racing	Volkswagen Golf GTi TCR	804	(Germany) Josef Kocsis	1–2*
(Germany) Mathilda Racing	Volkswagen Golf GTi TCR	804	(South Korea) "Charlie" Byunghui Kang	*
(Germany) Mathilda Racing	Volkswagen Golf GTi TCR	804	(Germany) Knut Kluge	*
(Germany) Mathilda Racing	Volkswagen Golf GTi TCR	804	(Austria) Constantin Kletzer	4, 7, 8
(Germany) Mathilda Racing	Volkswagen Golf GTi TCR	804	(Germany) Benjamin Leuchter	4, 9
(Germany) Mathilda Racing	Volkswagen Golf GTi TCR	804	(Germany) Dennis Wüsthoff	3
(Germany) Mathilda Racing	Volkswagen Golf GTi TCR	804	(Germany) Detlef Langels	5
(Germany) Mathilda Racing	Volkswagen Golf GTi TCR	804	(Germany) Guido Heinrich	5, 7
(Germany) Mathilda Racing	Volkswagen Golf GTi TCR	804	(Germany) Andreas Gülden	9
(Germany) Mathilda Racing	SEAT León TCR	806	(Austria) Constantin Kletzer	1–2, 6
(Germany) Mathilda Racing	SEAT León TCR	806	(Germany) Dennis Wüsthoff	1–2, 6
(Germany) Mathilda Racing	SEAT León TCR	806	(Germany) Michael Paatz	6*
(Germany) Mathilda Racing	SEAT León TCR	806	(Germany) Lutz Marc Rühl	*
(Germany) LMS Engineering	Audi RS3 LMS TCR	803	(Germany) Matthias Wasel	1–8
(Germany) LMS Engineering	Audi RS3 LMS TCR	803	(Germany) Marcus Löhnert	1–8
(Germany) LMS Engineering	Audi RS3 LMS TCR	803	(Russia) Artur Goroyan	1–2
(Germany) LMS Engineering	Audi RS3 LMS TCR	803	(Germany) Christian Schmitz	3–5
(Germany) LMS Engineering	Audi RS3 LMS TCR	803	(Germany) Mike Jäger	*
(Germany) LMS Engineering	Audi RS3 LMS TCR	803	(Germany) Pierre Humbert	*
(Germany) LMS Engineering	Audi RS3 LMS TCR	803	(Germany) Ulrich Andree	5*
(Germany) LMS Engineering	Audi RS3 LMS TCR	803	(Germany) Stefan Wieningen	7, 8
(Germany) BCS Motorsport	Opel Astra TCR	816	(Germany) Raphael Hundeborn	5
(Germany) BCS Motorsport	Opel Astra TCR	816	(Germany) Marc Legel	5
(Germany) BCS Motorsport	Opel Astra TCR	816	(Germany) Roman Löhnert	5
(Switzerland) Honda Racing-Team Schmid	Honda Civic Type-R TCR	818	(Switzerland) Roland Schmid	2–3, 5
(Switzerland) Honda Racing-Team Schmid	Honda Civic Type-R TCR	818	(Switzerland) Roger Vögeli	2–3, 5, 8
(Switzerland) Honda Racing-Team Schmid	Honda Civic Type-R TCR	818	(Germany) Markus Oestreich	2, 5, 8
(Switzerland) Honda Racing-Team Schmid	Honda Civic Type-R TCR	818	(Switzerland) Rudolf Rhyn	3
(Switzerland) Honda Racing-Team Schmid	Honda Civic Type-R TCR	818	(Germany) Moritz Oestreich	8
(Germany) FEV Racing	SEAT León TCR	820	(Germany) Benedikt Gentgen	3–5, 7-9
(Germany) FEV Racing	SEAT León TCR	820	(Germany) Jens Ludmann	1–2
(Germany) FEV Racing	SEAT León TCR	820	(Germany) Arnt Hallmanns	1–2, 5, 9
(Germany) FEV Racing	SEAT León TCR	820	(Germany) Marcel Willert	1, 3
(Germany) FEV Racing	SEAT León TCR	820	(Germany) Markus Horn	4
(Germany) FEV Racing	SEAT León TCR	820	(Germany) Rudi Speich	5
(Germany) FEV Racing	SEAT León TCR	820	(Germany) Bernd Hömberg	7, 8
(Germany) Kissling Motorsport	Opel Astra TCR	823	(Finland) Hannu Luostarinen	3, 6, 8
(Germany) Kissling Motorsport	Opel Astra TCR	823	(Germany) Volker Strycek	3, 6, 8

Drivers with an asterisk on their "Rounds" column took part in the non-championship 2017 24 Hours Nürburgring round.

=== Calendar and results ===
Rnd.	Circuit	Date	Pole position	Fastest lap	Winning drivers	Winning team
1	Nürburgring Nordschleife	25 March	(Germany) Andreas Gülden (Germany) Benjamin Leuchter	(Germany) Andreas Gülden (Germany) Benjamin Leuchter	(Germany) Andreas Gülden (Germany) Benjamin Leuchter	(Germany) Mathilda Racing
2	Nürburgring Nordschleife	8 April	(Germany) Andreas Gülden (Germany) Benjamin Leuchter	(Germany) Andreas Gülden (Germany) Benjamin Leuchter	(Germany) Andreas Gülden (Germany) Benjamin Leuchter	(Germany) Mathilda Racing
NC	Nürburgring Nordschleife	27–28 May	(Germany) Andreas Gülden (Germany) Benjamin Leuchter (Austria) Constantin Kletzer (Germany) Dennis Wüsthoff	(Germany) Andreas Gülden (Germany) Benjamin Leuchter (Austria) Constantin Kletzer (Germany) Dennis Wüsthoff	(Germany) Andreas Gülden (Germany) Benjamin Leuchter (Austria) Constantin Kletzer (Germany) Dennis Wüsthoff	(Germany) Mathilda Racing
3	Nürburgring Nordschleife	24 June	(Germany) Andreas Gülden (Germany) Benjamin Leuchter (Austria) Constantin Kletzer	(Finland) Hannu Luostarinen (Germany) Volker Strycek	(Germany) Benedikt Gentgen (Germany) Marcel Willert	(Germany) FEV Racing
4	Nürburgring Nordschleife	8 July	(Germany) Andreas Gülden (Germany) Benjamin Leuchter	(Germany) Andreas Gülden (Germany) Benjamin Leuchter	(Germany) Andreas Gülden (Germany) Benjamin Leuchter	(Germany) Mathilda Racing
5	Nürburgring Nordschleife	19 August	(Norway) Håkon Schjærin (Norway) Atle Gulbrandsen (Norway) Kenneth Østvold (Norway) Anders Lindstad	(Germany) Andreas Gülden (Germany) Benjamin Leuchter (Austria) Constantin Kletzer	(Norway) Håkon Schjærin (Norway) Atle Gulbrandsen (Norway) Kenneth Østvold (Norway) Anders Lindstad	(Norway) Møller Bil Motorsport
6	Nürburgring Nordschleife	2 September	(Germany) Andreas Gülden (Germany) Benjamin Leuchter	(Germany) Andreas Gülden (Germany) Benjamin Leuchter	(Finland) Hannu Luostarinen (Germany) Volker Strycek	(Germany) Kissling Motorsport
7	Nürburgring Nordschleife	23 September	(Finland) Hannu Luostarinen (Germany) Volker Strycek	(Finland) Hannu Luostarinen (Germany) Volker Strycek	(Germany) Andreas Gülden (Germany) Benjamin Leuchter	(Germany) Mathilda Racing
8	Nürburgring Nordschleife	7 October	(Germany) Andreas Gülden (Germany) Benjamin Leuchter	(Germany) Andreas Gülden (Germany) Benjamin Leuchter	(Finland) Hannu Luostarinen (Germany) Volker Strycek	(Germany) Kissling Motorsport
9	Nürburgring Nordschleife	21 October	(Germany) Andreas Gülden (Germany) Benjamin Leuchter (Germany) Michael Schrey	(Germany) Andreas Gülden (Germany) Benjamin Leuchter (Germany) Michael Schrey	(Germany) Andreas Gülden (Germany) Benjamin Leuchter (Germany) Michael Schrey	(Germany) Mathilda Racing

== TCR Baltic Trophy ==
The 2017 TCR Baltic Trophy is the first season of the TCR Baltic Trophy. TCR Baltic Trophy will run within the Baltic Touring Car Championship events.

=== Teams and drivers ===
Team	Car	No.	Drivers	Rounds
(Lithuania) Nero-GSR Racing Team	Volkswagen Golf GTI TCR	5	(Lithuania) Ernesta Globyte	All

=== Calendar and results ===
The 2017 schedule was announced on 13 December 2016. The calendar includes two rounds in Latvia and one in Estonia.

Round		Circuit	Date	Pole position	Fastest lap	Winning driver	Winning team	Supporting
1	R1	(Latvia) Biķernieku Kompleksā Sporta Bāze, Riga	29 April-1 May	(Lithuania) Ernesta Globyte	(Lithuania) Ernesta Globyte	(Lithuania) Ernesta Globyte	(Lithuania) Nero-GSR Racing Team	Baltic Touring Car Championship
1	R2	(Latvia) Biķernieku Kompleksā Sporta Bāze, Riga	29 April-1 May		(Lithuania) Ernesta Globyte	(Lithuania) Ernesta Globyte	(Lithuania) Nero-GSR Racing Team	Baltic Touring Car Championship
2	R1	(Estonia) Auto24ring, Pärnu	27–28 May	(Lithuania) Ernesta Globyte	(Lithuania) Ernesta Globyte	(Lithuania) Ernesta Globyte	(Lithuania) Nero-GSR Racing Team	Baltic Touring Car Championship
2	R2	(Estonia) Auto24ring, Pärnu	27–28 May		(Lithuania) Ernesta Globyte	(Lithuania) Ernesta Globyte	(Lithuania) Nero-GSR Racing Team	Baltic Touring Car Championship
3	R1	(Latvia) Biķernieku Kompleksā Sporta Bāze, Riga	18–20 August	(Lithuania) Ernesta Globyte	(Lithuania) Ernesta Globyte	(Lithuania) Ernesta Globyte	(Lithuania) Nero-GSR Racing Team	Baltic Touring Car Championship
3	R2	(Latvia) Biķernieku Kompleksā Sporta Bāze, Riga	18–20 August		(Lithuania) Ernesta Globyte	(Lithuania) Ernesta Globyte	(Lithuania) Nero-GSR Racing Team	Baltic Touring Car Championship
