= Benjamin Leuchter =

German racing driver

- Nationality: German
- Born: 22 November 1987 (age 38) Duisburg, Germany

TCR International Series career
- Debut season: 2017
- Current team: Max Kruse Racing
- Categorisation: FIA Silver
- Car number: 10
- Starts: 2

Previous series
- 2017 2017 2016 2009 2008, 15-17 2006 2004-05 2002-03: VLN; TCR International Series; Champions; ADAC Procar Series; VLN German Formula Three Championship; Formula BMW; Karting

Championship titles
- 2017 2017 2018: VLN – TCR Class; 24h Nurburgring - TCR Class; 24H Dubai - TCR Class

Benjamin Leuchter (born 22 November 1987) is a German racing driver currently competing in the World Touring Car Cup. Having previously competed in the Champions, German Formula Three Championship and Formula BMW amongst others.

== Racing career ==
Leuchter began his career in 2002 in Karting, he continued in karting until 2003. In 2004, he switched to the Formula BMW series, he finished the season nineteenth in the championship standings that year. The following year he only took part in the first eight races of the season, but still finished fifteenth in the Formula BMW standings in 2005. For 2006, he switched to the German Formula Three Championship, driving the last round of the championship that year. For 2008, he took part in the 24 Hours of Nürburgring, finishing fourth in the SP1/2 class. In 2009, he switched to the ADAC Procar Series, finishing tenth in the Division II standings. For 2015, he raced in the VLN series, racing in the BMW M235i Racing Cup, he finished the season sixth in the standings that year. Continuing in the series for 2016, again racing in the BMW M235i Racing Cup class, this time finishing tenth in the standings. The same year, he also raced in the inaugural 2016 ADAC TCR Germany Touring Car Championship season, taking a couple of podiums and fastest laps on his way to finishing fifth in the championship standings. For 2017, he returned to the VLN series, this time racing in the TCR class. Taking several victories, pole positions and podiums, on his way to winning the class.

In November 2017, it was announced that Leuchter would race in the TCR International Series, driving a Volkswagen Golf GTI TCR for WestCoast Racing.

Whilst competing for the Porsche 911 GT3 Cup class of the 2023 Nürburgring Langstrecken-Serie for Max Kruse Racing alongside Nicholas Otto, Leuchter became involved in an incident during the penultimate race, as he caused a collision with Michele di Martino. After a stewards investigation, Leuchter was found to have crashed into di Martino on purpose and was disqualified from this race, in addition to being excluded from the season finale. His teammate Otto would end up winning the Cup2 class on his own two weeks later.

== Racing record ==
=== Complete TCR International Series results ===
(key) (Races in bold indicate pole position) (Races in italics indicate fastest lap)

Year	Team	Car	1	2	3	4	5	6	7	8	9	10	11	12	13	14	15	16	17	18	19	20	DC	Points
2017	WestCoast Racing	Volkswagen Golf GTI TCR	RIM; 1	RIM; 2	BHR; 1	BHR; 2	SPA; 1	SPA; 2	MNZ; 1	MNZ; 2	SAL; 1	SAL; 2	HUN; 1	HUN; 2	OSC; 1	OSC; 2	CHA; 1	CHA; 2	ZHE; 1	ZHE; 2	DUB; 1; 13	DUB; 2; 6	26th	13

=== Complete World Touring Car Cup results ===
(key) (Races in bold indicate pole position) (Races in italics indicate fastest lap)

Year	Team	Car	1	2	3	4	5	6	7	8	9	10	11	12	13	14	15	16	17	18	19	20	21	22	23	24	25	26	27	28	29	30	DC	Pts
2019	SLR Volkswagen	Volkswagen Golf GTI TCR	MAR; 1; 16	MAR; 2; 23	MAR; 3; 20	HUN; 1; 20	HUN; 2; 12	HUN; 3; 17	SVK; 1; 14	SVK; 2 Ret	SVK; 3; 16	NED; 1; 8	NED; 2; 2	NED; 3 Ret	GER; 1; 7	GER; 2; 5	**GER**; **3**; 1	POR; 1; 15	POR; 2; 17	POR; 3; 17	CHN; 1; 18	CHN; 2 Ret	CHN; 3 DNS	JPN; 1 Ret	JPN; 2; 12	JPN; 3; 10	MAC; 1; 22	MAC; 2; 21	MAC; 3; 21	MAL; 1; 16	MAL; 2; 10	MAL; 3; 8	19th	111

=== Complete 24 Hours of Nürburgring results ===
Year	Team	Co-Drivers	Car	Class	Laps	Pos.	Class Pos.
2008		(Germany) Harald Hennes (Germany) Swen Landgraf (Germany) Steffen Ramer	Ford Fiesta	SP1-SP2	117	79th	4th
2016	(Germany) racing one GmbH	(Germany) Fabian Danz (Germany) Dennis Wüsthoff (Germany) Tim Zimmermann	Volkswagen Golf GTI TCR	TCR	91	93rd	**2nd**
2017	(Germany) mathilda racing	(Germany) Andreas Gülden (Austria) Constantin Kletzer (Germany) Dennis Wüsthoff	Volkswagen Golf GTI TCR	TCR	142	29th	**1st**
2021	(Germany) Max Kruse Racing	(Germany) Christian Gebhardt (Germany) Andreas Gülden (Germany) Nick Hancke	Volkswagen Golf GTI TCR	SP3T	54	36th	**1st**
2022	(Germany) Max Kruse Racing	(Denmark) Peter Hansen (Denmark) Lars Nielsen	Audi RS3 LMS TCR (2017)	TCR	118	DNF	DNF
2023	(Germany) ADAC Sachsen e.V.	(Germany) Dominik Fugel (Germany) Fidel Leib (Germany) Moritz Oestreich	Porsche 992 GT3 Cup	Cup2 Am	122	DNF	DNF
2024	(Germany) Max Kruse Racing	(Germany) Heiko Hammel (Sweden) Johan Kristoffersson (Germany) Nicholas Otto	Volkswagen Golf GTI TCR Clubsport 24h	AT3	44	43rd	**1st**
2025	(Germany) Max Kruse Racing	(Germany) Heiko Hammel (Sweden) Johan Kristoffersson (Germany) Nicholas Otto	Volkswagen Golf GTI TCR Clubsport 24h	AT3	128	24th	**1st**
