= 2020 12 Hours of Monza =

The layout of the Autodromo Nazionale di Monza

The 2020 Hankook 12 Hours of Monza was the 1st running of the 12 Hours of Monza. It is the third round of both the 2020 24H GT Series and the 2020 24H TCE Series, the second round of the Europe Series, being held on from 10 to 11 July at the Autodromo Nazionale di Monza. The race was won by Jürgen Häring, Taki Konstantinou and Alfred Renauer driving for Herberth Motorsport.

== Schedule ==
The race was split into two parts, the first being 4 hours and the second being 8 hours long due to noise restrictions.

Date	Time (local: CEST)	Event	Distance
Friday, 10 July	09:30 - 10:40	Practice (GT and TCE)	70 Mins
Friday, 10 July	11:30 - 12:00	Qualifying - TCE	30 Mins
Friday, 10 July	12:05 - 12:35	Qualifying - GT	30 Mins
Friday, 10 July	14:15	Start Grid	
Friday, 10 July	15:00	Race (Part 1)	4 Hours
Saturday, 11 July	10:30	Start Grid	
Saturday, 11 July	11:00	Race (Part 2)	8 Hours

== Entry list ==
A total of twenty-three cars were entered for the event; 13 GT and 10 TCE cars.

Team	Car	No.	Drivers
GT3-Pro (1 entry)
(Germany) Herberth Motorsport	Porsche 911 GT3 R (2019)	91	(Switzerland) Daniel Allemann (Germany) Ralf Bohn (Germany) Alfred Renauer (Germany) Robert Renauer
GT3-Am (6 entries)
(Netherlands) Equipe Verschuur	Renault R.S. 01 FGT3	9	(Netherlands) Harrie Kolen (Netherlands) Erik van Loon (Netherlands) Mike Verschuur
(Germany) Wochenspiegel Team Monschau	Ferrari 488 GT3	22	(Germany) Jochen Krumbach (Germany) Hendrik Still (Germany) Georg Weiss (Germany) Leonard Weiss
(Germany) Car Collection Motorsport	Audi R8 LMS Evo	32	(Germany) Gustav Edelhoff (Germany) Elmar Grimm (Germany) Johannes Dr. Kirchhoff
(Italy) MP Racing	Mercedes-AMG GT3 Evo	58	(Italy) Corinna Gostner (Italy) David Gostner (Italy) Manuela Gostner (Italy) Thomas Gostner (Italy) Giorgio Sernagiotto
(Germany) Herberth Motorsport	Porsche 911 GT3 R (2019)	92	(Germany) Jürgen Häring (Greece) Taki Konstantinou (Germany) Alfred Renauer
(Germany) Herberth Motorsport	Porsche 911 GT3 R (2019)	93	(Germany) Stefan Aust (Austria) Klaus Bachler (Germany) Steffen Görig
GTX (3 entries)
(Netherlands) JR Motorsport	BMW M3 F80	703	(Netherlands) Ruud Olij (Netherlands) Ted van Vliet
(Slovakia) ARC Bratislava	Lamborghini Huracán Super Trofeo (2017)	707	(Slovakia) Mat'o Homola (Slovakia) Miro Konôpka (Slovakia) Mat'o Konopka
(Austria) Reiter Engineering	KTM GTX Concept	746	(Austria) Eike Angermayr (Austria) Laura Kraihamer (Slovakia) Stefan Rosina
991 (2 entries)
(Belgium) Speed Lover	Porsche 991 GT3 Cup II	978	(United States) Dominique Bastien (United Kingdom) Gavin Pickering
(Belgium) Speed Lover	Porsche 991 GT3 Cup II	979	(Belgium) Olivier Dons (Belgium) Rolf Lietart (France) Eric Mouez
GT4 (1 entry)
(Netherlands) MDM Motorsport	BMW M4 GT4	450	(Netherlands) Tim Coronel (Netherlands) Tom Coronel (Netherlands) Jan Jaap van Roon
TCR (7 entries)
(Switzerland) Autorama Motorsport by Wolf-Power Racing	Volkswagen Golf GTI TCR	1	(Italy) Roberto Ferri (Switzerland) Yannick Mettler (Italy) Sandro Pelatti (Italy) Alberto Vescovi
(Switzerland) Autorama Motorsport by Wolf-Power Racing	Volkswagen Golf GTI TCR	112	(Switzerland) Miklas Born (Austria) Constantin Kletzer (Switzerland) Yannick Mettler
(Netherlands) Red Camel-Jordans.nl	CUPRA León TCR	101	(Netherlands) Ivo Breukers (Netherlands) Luc Breukers
(Slovakia) Brutal Fish Racing Team by KCMG	Honda Civic Type R TCR (FK8)	122	(United Kingdom) Daniel Lloyd (Spain) Pepe Oriola (Slovakia) Martin Ryba
(Switzerland) TOPCAR Sport	CUPRA León TCR	131	(Switzerland) Fabian Danz (Switzerland) Karen Gaillard (Germany) Loris Prattes
(Netherlands) NKPP Racing by Bas Koeten Racing	CUPRA León TCR	175	(Netherlands) Gijs Bessem (Netherlands) Harry Hilders
(Belgium) AC Motorsport	Audi RS 3 LMS TCR	188	(Belgium) Mathieu Detry (France) Stéphane Perrin (Belgium) Vincent Radermecker
TCX (3 entries)
(Switzerland) Autorama Motorsport	SEAT León Cup Racer	211	(Switzerland) Armando Stanco (Switzerland) Dario Stanco (Switzerland) Luigi Stanco
(France) Nordschleife Racing	Ligier JS2 R	226	(France) Johan Boris Scheier (France) Régis Rego de Sebes (France) Daniel Waszczinski
(United Kingdom) WEC Motorsport	BMW M3 E46	339	(United Kingdom) Dave Cox (United Kingdom) Jason Cox (United Kingdom) George Haynes

== Results ==
=== Practice ===
Fastest in class in bold.

Pos	Class	No.	Team	Drivers	Car	Time	Laps
1	**GT3-Am**	**93**	**(Germany) Herberth Motorsport**	**(Germany) Stefan Aust** **(Austria) Klaus Bachler** **(Germany) Steffen Görig**	**Porsche 911 GT3 R (2019)**	**1:49.813**	**28**
2	GT3-Am	9	(Netherlands) Equipe Verschuur	(Netherlands) Harrie Kolen (Netherlands) Erik van Loon (Netherlands) Mike Verschuur	Renault R.S. 01 FGT3	1:50.225	28
3	GT3-Am	92	(Germany) Herberth Motorsport	(Germany) Jürgen Häring (Greece) Taki Konstantinou (Germany) Alfred Renauer	Porsche 911 GT3 R (2019)	1:51.037	28
4	GT3-Am	34	(Germany) Car Collection Motorsport	(Germany) Gustav Edelhoff (Germany) Elmar Grimm (Germany) Johannes Dr. Kirchhoff	Audi R8 LMS Evo	1:51.804	26
5	GT3-Am	22	(Germany) Wochenspiegel Team Monschau	(Germany) Jochen Krumbach (Germany) Hendrik Still (Germany) Georg Weiss (Germany) Leonard Weiss	Ferrari 488 GT3	1:52.133	26
6	**GT3-Pro**	**91**	**(Germany) Herberth Motorsport**	**(Switzerland) Daniel Allemann** **(Germany) Ralf Bohn** **(Germany) Alfred Renauer** **(Germany) Robert Renauer**	**Porsche 911 GT3 R (2019)**	**1:52.274**	**22**
7	**GTX**	**746**	**(Austria) Reiter Engineering**	**(Austria) Eike Angermayr** **(Austria) Laura Kraihamer** **(Slovakia) Stefan Rosina**	**KTM GTX Concept**	**1:52.492**	**27**
8	GT3-Am	58	(Italy) MP Racing	(Italy) Corinna Gostner (Italy) David Gostner (Italy) Manuela Gostner (Italy) Thomas Gostner (Italy) Giorgio Sernagiotto	Mercedes-AMG GT3 Evo	1:53.702	23
9	GTX	707	(Slovakia) ARC Bratislava	(Slovakia) Mat'o Homola (Slovakia) Miro Konôpka (Slovakia) Mat'o Konopka	Lamborghini Huracán Super Trofeo Evo (2017)	1:55.756	12
10	**991**	**978**	**(Belgium) Speed Lover**	**(United States) Dominique Bastien** **(United Kingdom) Gavin Pickering**	**Porsche 991 GT3 Cup II**	**1:55.921**	**20**
11	991	979	(Belgium) Speed Lover	(Belgium) Olivier Dons (Belgium) Rolf Lietart (France) Eric Mouez	Porsche 991 GT3 Cup II	2:01.190	19
12	**GT4**	**450**	**(Netherlands) MDM Motorsport**	**(Netherlands) Tim Coronel** **(Netherlands) Tom Coronel** **(Netherlands) Jan Jaap van Roon**	**BMW M4 GT4**	**2:01.908**	**21**
13	**TCR**	**122**	**(Slovakia) Brutal Fish Racing Team by KCMG**	**(United Kingdom) Daniel Lloyd** **(Spain) Pepe Oriola** **(Slovakia) Martin Ryba**	**Honda Civic Type R TCR (FK8)**	**2:02.048**	**11**
14	GTX	703	(Netherlands) JR Motorsport	(Netherlands) Ruud Olij (Netherlands) Ted van Vliet	BMW M3 F80	2:03.039	14
15	TCR	188	(Belgium) AC Motorsport	(Belgium) Mathieu Detry (France) Stéphane Perrin (Belgium) Vincent Radermecker	Audi RS 3 LMS TCR	2:03.107	26
16	TCR	112	(Switzerland) Autorama Motorsport by Wolf-Power Racing	(Switzerland) Miklas Born (Austria) Constantin Kletzer (Switzerland) Yannick Mettler	Volkswagen Golf GTI TCR	2:03.839	17
17	**TCX**	**211**	**(Switzerland) Autorama Motorsport**	**(Switzerland) Armando Stanco** **(Switzerland) Dario Stanco** **(Switzerland) Luigi Stanco**	**SEAT León Cup Racer**	**2:03.985**	**24**
18	TCR	175	(Netherlands) NKPP Racing by Bas Koeten Racing	(Netherlands) Gijs Bessem (Netherlands) Harry Hilders	CUPRA León TCR	2:04.421	22
19	TCR	131	(Switzerland) TOPCAR Sport	(Switzerland) Fabian Danz (Switzerland) Karen Gaillard (Germany) Loris Prattes	CUPRA León TCR	2:04.451	24
20	TCR	1	(Switzerland) Autorama Motorsport by Wolf-Power Racing	(Italy) Roberto Ferri (Switzerland) Yannick Mettler (Italy) Sandro Pelatti (Italy) Alberto Vescovi	Volkswagen Golf GTI TCR	2:07.078	20
21	TCX	226	(France) Nordschleife Racing	(France) Johan Boris Scheier (France) Régis Rego de Sebes (France) Daniel Waszczinski	Ligier JS2 R	2:08.032	24
22	TCX	339	(United Kingdom) WEC Motorsport	(United Kingdom) Dave Cox (United Kingdom) Jason Cox (United Kingdom) George Haynes	BMW M3 E46	2:11.254	9
23	TCR	101	(Netherlands) Red Camel-Jordans.nl	(Netherlands) Ivo Breukers (Netherlands) Luc Breukers	CUPRA León TCR		11

=== Qualifying ===
==== GT ====
Fastest in class in bold.

Pos	Class	No.	Team	Drivers	Car	Time	Laps
1	**GT3-Am**	**9**	**(Netherlands) Equipe Verschuur**	**(Netherlands) Harrie Kolen** **(Netherlands) Erik van Loon** **(Netherlands) Mike Verschuur**	**Renault R.S. 01 FGT3**	**1:48.821**	**12**
2	GT3-Am	93	(Germany) Herberth Motorsport	(Germany) Stefan Aust (Austria) Klaus Bachler (Germany) Steffen Görig	Porsche 911 GT3 R (2019)	1:48.940	5
3	**GT3-Pro**	**91**	**(Germany) Herberth Motorsport**	**(Switzerland) Daniel Allemann** **(Germany) Ralf Bohn** **(Germany) Alfred Renauer** **(Germany) Robert Renauer**	**Porsche 911 GT3 R (2019)**	**1:49.535**	**8**
4	GT3-Am	34	(Germany) Car Collection Motorsport	(Germany) Gustav Edelhoff (Germany) Elmar Grimm (Germany) Johannes Dr. Kirchhoff	Audi R8 LMS Evo	1:49.957	12
5	GT3-Am	58	(Italy) MP Racing	(Italy) Corinna Gostner (Italy) David Gostner (Italy) Manuela Gostner (Italy) Thomas Gostner (Italy) Giorgio Sernagiotto	Mercedes-AMG GT3 Evo	1:50.120	12
6	GT3-Am	92	(Germany) Herberth Motorsport	(Germany) Jürgen Häring (Greece) Taki Konstantinou (Germany) Alfred Renauer	Porsche 911 GT3 R (2019)	1:50.543	13
7	GT3-Am	22	(Germany) Wochenspiegel Team Monschau	(Germany) Jochen Krumbach (Germany) Hendrik Still (Germany) Georg Weiss (Germany) Leonard Weiss	Ferrari 488 GT3	1:50.626	12
8	**GTX**	**746**	**(Austria) Reiter Engineering**	**(Austria) Eike Angermayr** **(Austria) Laura Kraihamer** **(Slovakia) Stefan Rosina**	**KTM GTX Concept**	**1:52.881**	**12**
9	**991**	**978**	**(Belgium) Speed Lover**	**(United States) Dominique Bastien** **(United Kingdom) Gavin Pickering**	**Porsche 991 GT3 Cup II**	**1:55.290**	**11**
10	991	979	(Belgium) Speed Lover	(Belgium) Olivier Dons (Belgium) Rolf Lietart (France) Eric Mouez	Porsche 991 GT3 Cup II	1:58.379	12
11	GTX	703	(Netherlands) JR Motorsport	(Netherlands) Ruud Olij (Netherlands) Ted van Vliet	BMW M3 F80	1:58.692	9
12	**GT4**	**450**	**(Netherlands) MDM Motorsport**	**(Netherlands) Tim Coronel** **(Netherlands) Tom Coronel** **(Netherlands) Jan Jaap van Roon**	**BMW M4 GT4**	**2:00.104**	**11**
13	GTX	707	(Slovakia) ARC Bratislava	(Slovakia) Mat'o Homola (Slovakia) Miro Konôpka (Slovakia) Mat'o Konopka	Lamborghini Huracán Super Trofeo Evo (2017)		4

==== TCE ====
Fastest in class in bold.

Pos	Class	No.	Team	Drivers	Car	Time	Laps
1	**TCR**	**122**	**(Slovakia) Brutal Fish Racing Team by KCMG**	**(United Kingdom) Daniel Lloyd** **(Spain) Pepe Oriola** **(Slovakia) Martin Ryba**	**Honda Civic Type R TCR (FK8)**	**2:01.171**	**7**
2	TCR	188	(Belgium) AC Motorsport	(Belgium) Mathieu Detry (France) Stéphane Perrin (Belgium) Vincent Radermecker	Audi RS 3 LMS TCR	2:01.603	13
3	TCR	112	(Switzerland) Autorama Motorsport by Wolf-Power Racing	(Switzerland) Miklas Born (Austria) Constantin Kletzer (Switzerland) Yannick Mettler	Volkswagen Golf GTI TCR	2:01.747	12
4	TCR	101	(Netherlands) Red Camel-Jordans.nl	(Netherlands) Ivo Breukers (Netherlands) Luc Breukers	CUPRA León TCR	2:01.915	8
5	**TCX**	**226**	**(France) Nordschleife Racing**	**(France) Johan Boris Scheier** **(France) Régis Rego de Sebes** **(France) Daniel Waszczinski**	**Ligier JS2 R**	**2:02.612**	**11**
6	TCR	131	(Switzerland) TOPCAR Sport	(Switzerland) Fabian Danz (Switzerland) Karen Gaillard (Germany) Loris Prattes	CUPRA León TCR	2:02.782	10
7	TCR	175	(Netherlands) NKPP Racing by Bas Koeten Racing	(Netherlands) Gijs Bessem (Netherlands) Harry Hilders	CUPRA León TCR	2:03.400	12
8	TCR	1	(Switzerland) Autorama Motorsport by Wolf-Power Racing	(Italy) Roberto Ferri (Switzerland) Yannick Mettler (Italy) Sandro Pelatti (Italy) Alberto Vescovi	Volkswagen Golf GTI TCR	2:05.163	12
9	TCX	339	(United Kingdom) WEC Motorsport	(United Kingdom) Dave Cox (United Kingdom) Jason Cox (United Kingdom) George Haynes	BMW M3 E46	2:10.045	6
10	TCX	211	(Switzerland) Autorama Motorsport	(Switzerland) Armando Stanco (Switzerland) Dario Stanco (Switzerland) Luigi Stanco	SEAT León Cup Racer		

=== Race ===
==== Part 1 ====
Class winner in bold.

Pos	Class	No.	Team	Drivers	Car	Time/Reason	Laps
1	**GTX**	**746**	**(Austria) Reiter Engineering**	**(Austria) Eike Angermayr** **(Austria) Laura Kraihamer** **(Slovakia) Stefan Rosina**	**KTM GTX Concept**	**4:00:18.675**	**116**
2	**GT3-Am**	**93**	**(Germany) Herberth Motorsport**	**(Germany) Stefan Aust** **(Austria) Klaus Bachler** **(Germany) Steffen Görig**	**Porsche 911 GT3 R (2019)**	**+1:43.751**	**116**
3	**GT3-Pro**	**91**	**(Germany) Herberth Motorsport**	**(Switzerland) Daniel Allemann** **(Germany) Ralf Bohn** **(Germany) Alfred Renauer** **(Germany) Robert Renauer**	**Porsche 911 GT3 R (2019)**	**+1 Lap**	**115**
4	GT3-Am	92	(Germany) Herberth Motorsport	(Germany) Jürgen Häring (Greece) Taki Konstantinou (Germany) Alfred Renauer	Porsche 911 GT3 R (2019)	+1 Lap	115
5	GT3-Am	34	(Germany) Car Collection Motorsport	(Germany) Gustav Edelhoff (Germany) Elmar Grimm (Germany) Johannes Dr. Kirchhoff	Audi R8 LMS Evo	+6 Laps	110
6	**991**	**978**	**(Belgium) Speed Lover**	**(United States) Dominique Bastien** **(United Kingdom) Gavin Pickering**	**Porsche 991 GT3 Cup II**	**+7 Laps**	**109**
7	GT3-Am	58	(Italy) MP Racing	(Italy) Corinna Gostner (Italy) David Gostner (Italy) Manuela Gostner (Italy) Thomas Gostner (Italy) Giorgio Sernagiotto	Mercedes-AMG GT3 Evo	+7 Laps	109
8	GT3-Am	22	(Germany) Wochenspiegel Team Monschau	(Germany) Jochen Krumbach (Germany) Hendrik Still (Germany) Georg Weiss (Germany) Leonard Weiss	Ferrari 488 GT3	+7 Laps	109
9	GTX	707	(Slovakia) ARC Bratislava	(Slovakia) Mat'o Homola (Slovakia) Miro Konôpka (Slovakia) Mat'o Konopka	Lamborghini Huracán Super Trofeo Evo (2017)	+8 Laps	108
10	**TCR**	**175**	**(Netherlands) NKPP Racing by Bas Koeten Racing**	**(Netherlands) Gijs Bessem** **(Netherlands) Harry Hilders**	**CUPRA León TCR**	**+9 Laps**	**107**
11	**GT4**	**450**	**(Netherlands) MDM Motorsport**	**(Netherlands) Tim Coronel** **(Netherlands) Tom Coronel** **(Netherlands) Jan Jaap van Roon**	**BMW M4 GT4**	**+9 Laps**	**107**
12	TCR	112	(Switzerland) Autorama Motorsport by Wolf-Power Racing	(Switzerland) Miklas Born (Austria) Constantin Kletzer (Switzerland) Yannick Mettler	Volkswagen Golf GTI TCR	+10 Laps	106
13	TCR	131	(Switzerland) TOPCAR Sport	(Switzerland) Fabian Danz (Switzerland) Karen Gaillard (Germany) Loris Prattes	CUPRA León TCR	+10 Laps	106
14	991	979	(Belgium) Speed Lover	(Belgium) Olivier Dons (Belgium) Rolf Lietart (France) Eric Mouez	Porsche 991 GT3 Cup II	+11 Laps	105
15	TCR	122	(Slovakia) Brutal Fish Racing Team by KCMG	(United Kingdom) Daniel Lloyd (Spain) Pepe Oriola (Slovakia) Martin Ryba	Honda Civic Type R TCR (FK8)	+11 Laps	105
16	GTX	703	(Netherlands) JR Motorsport	(Netherlands) Ruud Olij (Netherlands) Ted van Vliet	BMW M3 F80	+11 Laps	105
17	**TCX**	**211**	**(Switzerland) Autorama Motorsport**	**(Switzerland) Armando Stanco** **(Switzerland) Dario Stanco** **(Switzerland) Luigi Stanco**	**SEAT León Cup Racer**	**+13 Laps**	**103**
18	TCR	1	(Switzerland) Autorama Motorsport by Wolf-Power Racing	(Italy) Roberto Ferri (Switzerland) Yannick Mettler (Italy) Sandro Pelatti (Italy) Alberto Vescovi	Volkswagen Golf GTI TCR	+14 Laps	102
19	TCR	101	(Netherlands) Red Camel-Jordans.nl	(Netherlands) Ivo Breukers (Netherlands) Luc Breukers	CUPRA León TCR	+14 Laps	102
20	TCR	188	(Belgium) AC Motorsport	(Belgium) Mathieu Detry (France) Stéphane Perrin (Belgium) Vincent Radermecker	Audi RS 3 LMS TCR	+14 Laps	102
21	TCX	339	(United Kingdom) WEC Motorsport	(United Kingdom) Dave Cox (United Kingdom) Jason Cox (United Kingdom) George Haynes	BMW M3 E46	+17 Laps	99
22 DNF	TCX	226	(France) Nordschleife Racing	(France) Johan Boris Scheier (France) Régis Rego de Sebes (France) Daniel Waszczinski	Ligier JS2 R	Retired	93
DNF	GT3-Am	9	(Netherlands) Equipe Verschuur	(Netherlands) Harrie Kolen (Netherlands) Erik van Loon (Netherlands) Mike Verschuur	Renault R.S. 01 FGT3	Retired	16

==== Part 2 ====
Class winner in bold.

Pos	Class	No.	Team	Drivers	Car	Time/Reason	Laps
1	**GT3-Am**	**92**	**(Germany) Herberth Motorsport**	**(Germany) Jürgen Häring** **(Greece) Taki Konstantinou** **(Germany) Alfred Renauer**	**Porsche 911 GT3 R (2019)**	**8:00:51.394**	**285**
2	GT3-Am	93	(Germany) Herberth Motorsport	(Germany) Stefan Aust (Austria) Klaus Bachler (Germany) Steffen Görig	Porsche 911 GT3 R (2019)	+28.741	285
3	**GT3-Pro**	**91**	**(Germany) Herberth Motorsport**	**(Switzerland) Daniel Allemann** **(Germany) Ralf Bohn** **(Germany) Alfred Renauer** **(Germany) Robert Renauer**	**Porsche 911 GT3 R (2019)**	**+5 Laps**	**280**
4	GT3-Am	58	(Italy) MP Racing	(Italy) Corinna Gostner (Italy) David Gostner (Italy) Manuela Gostner (Italy) Thomas Gostner (Italy) Giorgio Sernagiotto	Mercedes-AMG GT3 Evo	+13 Laps	272
5	GT3-Am	34	(Germany) Car Collection Motorsport	(Germany) Gustav Edelhoff (Germany) Elmar Grimm (Germany) Johannes Dr. Kirchhoff	Audi R8 LMS Evo	+15 Laps	270
6	**GTX**	**707**	**(Slovakia) ARC Bratislava**	**(Slovakia) Mat'o Homola** **(Slovakia) Miro Konôpka** **(Slovakia) Mat'o Konopka**	**Lamborghini Huracán Super Trofeo Evo (2017)**	**+17 Laps**	**268**
7	**991**	**978**	**(Belgium) Speed Lover**	**(United States) Dominique Bastien** **(United Kingdom) Gavin Pickering**	**Porsche 991 GT3 Cup II**	**+20 Laps**	**265**
8	**TCR**	**101**	**(Netherlands) Red Camel-Jordans.nl**	**(Netherlands) Ivo Breukers** **(Netherlands) Luc Breukers**	**CUPRA León TCR**	**+24 Laps**	**261**
9	TCR	112	(Switzerland) Autorama Motorsport by Wolf-Power Racing	(Switzerland) Miklas Born (Austria) Constantin Kletzer (Switzerland) Yannick Mettler	Volkswagen Golf GTI TCR	+25 Laps	260
10	TCR	122	(Slovakia) Brutal Fish Racing Team by KCMG	(United Kingdom) Daniel Lloyd (Spain) Pepe Oriola (Slovakia) Martin Ryba	Honda Civic Type R TCR (FK8)	+26 Laps	259
11	TCR	175	(Netherlands) NKPP Racing by Bas Koeten Racing	(Netherlands) Gijs Bessem (Netherlands) Harry Hilders	CUPRA León TCR	+28 Laps	257
12	TCR	131	(Switzerland) TOPCAR Sport	(Switzerland) Fabian Danz (Switzerland) Karen Gaillard (Germany) Loris Prattes	CUPRA León TCR	+29 Laps	256
13	TCR	1	(Switzerland) Autorama Motorsport by Wolf-Power Racing	(Italy) Roberto Ferri (Switzerland) Yannick Mettler (Italy) Sandro Pelatti (Italy) Alberto Vescovi	Volkswagen Golf GTI TCR	+29 Laps	256
14	**GT4**	**450**	**(Netherlands) MDM Motorsport**	**(Netherlands) Tim Coronel** **(Netherlands) Tom Coronel** **(Netherlands) Jan Jaap van Roon**	**BMW M4 GT4**	**+31 Laps**	**254**
15	GTX	703	(Netherlands) JR Motorsport	(Netherlands) Ruud Olij (Netherlands) Ted van Vliet	BMW M3 F80	+37 Laps	248
16	GTX	746	(Austria) Reiter Engineering	(Austria) Eike Angermayr (Austria) Laura Kraihamer (Slovakia) Stefan Rosina	KTM GTX Concept	+40 Laps	245
17 DNF	991	979	(Belgium) Speed Lover	(Belgium) Olivier Dons (Belgium) Rolf Lietart (France) Eric Mouez	Porsche 991 GT3 Cup II	+43 Laps	242
18	**TCX**	**211**	**(Switzerland) Autorama Motorsport**	**(Switzerland) Armando Stanco** **(Switzerland) Dario Stanco** **(Switzerland) Luigi Stanco**	**SEAT León Cup Racer**	**+48 Laps**	**237**
19	TCX	339	(United Kingdom) WEC Motorsport	(United Kingdom) Dave Cox (United Kingdom) Jason Cox (United Kingdom) George Haynes	BMW M3 E46	+54 Laps	231
20	TCX	226	(France) Nordschleife Racing	(France) Johan Boris Scheier (France) Régis Rego de Sebes (France) Daniel Waszczinski	Ligier JS2 R	+56 Laps	229
DNF	GT3-Am	22	(Germany) Wochenspiegel Team Monschau	(Germany) Jochen Krumbach (Germany) Hendrik Still (Germany) Georg Weiss (Germany) Leonard Weiss	Ferrari 488 GT3	Retired	167
DNF	TCR	188	(Belgium) AC Motorsport	(Belgium) Mathieu Detry (France) Stéphane Perrin (Belgium) Vincent Radermecker	Audi RS 3 LMS TCR	Retired	155
DNF	GT3-Am	9	(Netherlands) Equipe Verschuur	(Netherlands) Harrie Kolen (Netherlands) Erik van Loon (Netherlands) Mike Verschuur	Renault R.S. 01 FGT3	Did Not Start	16

24H Series
Previous race: 24 Hours of Portimão	2020 season	Next race: 16 Hours of Hockenheimring
