= 2020 16 Hours of Hockenheimring =

The layout of the Hockenheimring

The 2020 Hankook 16 Hours of Hockenheimring was the 1st running of the 16 Hours of Hockenheimring. It is the fourth round of both the 2020 24H GT Series and the 2020 24H TCE Series, the third round of the Europe and Continent Series, and will be held from 5 to 6 September at the Hockenheimring. It was the first 24H Series event to take place in Germany. The race was won by Gijs Bessem, Harry Hilders and Marcel van Berlo.

== Schedule ==
The race was split into two parts, the first being 8 hours and the second being 8 hours long due to noise restrictions.

Date	Time (local: CEST)	Event	Distance
Friday, 4 September	15:45 - 17:15	Practice (GT and TCE)	90 Mins
Friday, 4 September	18:50 - 19:20	Qualifying - TCE	30 Mins
Friday, 4 September	19:30 - 20:00	Qualifying - GT	30 Mins
Saturday, 5 September	11:00	Start Grid	
Saturday, 5 September	12:00	Race (Part 1)	8 Hours
Sunday, 6 September	11:00	Start Grid	
Sunday, 6 September	12:00	Race (Part 2)	8 Hours

== Entry list ==
A total of fifteen cars were entered for the event; 8 GT and 7 TCE cars.

Team	Car	No.	Drivers
GT3-Am (2 entries)
(Netherlands) Equipe Verschuur	Renault R.S. 01 FGT3	9	(Netherlands) Harrie Kolen (Netherlands) Erik van Loon (Netherlands) Mike Verschuur
(United States) CP Racing	Mercedes-AMG GT3 Evo	85	(United States) Charles Espenlaub (United States) Joe Foster (United States) Shane Lewis (United States) Charles Putman
GTX (1 entry)
(Germany) Proton Competition	Porsche 911 RSR	711	(United States) Dominique Bastien (Thailand) Vutthikorn Inthraphuvasak (Germany) Christian Ried
991 (3 entries)
(Luxembourg) DUWO Racing	Porsche 991 GT3 Cup II	909	(Russia) Andrey Mukovoz (Russia) Sergey Peregudov (Russia) Stanislav Sidoruk
(Belgium) Speed Lover	Porsche 991 GT3 Cup II	978	(United States) Dominique Bastien (France) Eric Mouez (Netherlands) Jeroen Kreeft (Belgium) Rolf Lietart
(Netherlands) NKPP Racing by Bas Koeten Racing	Porsche 991 GT3 Cup II	991	(Netherlands) Gijs Bessem (Netherlands) Harry Hilders (Netherlands) Marcel van Berlo
GT4 (2 entries)
(Germany) PROsport Performance AMR	Aston Martin Vantage AMR GT4	401	(Belgium) Rodrigue Gillion (Belgium) Tom Heeren (Belgium) Nico Verdonck
(Germany) Team Avia Sorg Rennsport	BMW M4 GT4	451	(Germany) Björn Simon (Spain) José Manuel de los Milagros (Germany) Heiko Eichenberg (Germany) Olaf Meyer
TCR (5 entries)
(Switzerland) Autorama Motorsport by Wolf-Power Racing	Volkswagen Golf GTI TCR	1	(Austria) Constantin Kletzer (Switzerland) Christopher Lenz (United Kingdom) Rhys Lloyd (Switzerland) Yannick Mettler (Switzerland) Jasmin Preisig
(Switzerland) Autorama Motorsport by Wolf-Power Racing	Volkswagen Golf GTI TCR	112	(Switzerland) Miklas Born (Italy) Roberto Ferri (Germany) Benjamin Leuchter (Germany) Marek Schaller (Italy) Alberto Vescovi
(Netherlands) Red Camel-Jordans.nl	CUPRA León TCR	101	(Netherlands) Ivo Breukers (Netherlands) Luc Breukers (United Kingdom) Stephen Liquorish
(Switzerland) TOPCAR Sport	CUPRA León TCR	131	(Switzerland) Fabian Danz (Switzerland) Karen Gaillard (Germany) Kai Jordan
(Belgium) AC Motorsport	Audi RS 3 LMS TCR	188	(Belgium) Mathieu Detry (France) Stéphane Perrin (Belgium) Vincent Radermecker
TCX (6 entries)
(France) Nordschleife Racing	Ligier JS2 R	226	(France) Guillaume Roman (Canada) Michel Sallenbach (France) Daniel Waszczinski
(Netherlands) DayVTec Engineering	BMW M240i Cup	240	(Netherlands) Tim Coronel (Netherlands) Jan Jaap van Roon (Netherlands) Gaby Uljee

== Results ==
=== Practice ===
Fastest in class in bold.

Pos	Class	No.	Team	Drivers	Car	Time	Laps
1	**GT3-Am**	**9**	**(Netherlands) Equipe Verschuur**	**(Netherlands) Harrie Kolen** **(Netherlands) Erik van Loon** **(Netherlands) Mike Verschuur**	**Renault R.S. 01 FGT3**	**1:41.437**	**23**
2	GT3-Am	85	(United States) CP Racing	(United States) Charles Espenlaub (United States) Joe Foster (United States) Shane Lewis (United States) Charles Putman	Mercedes-AMG GT3 Evo	1:42.096	32
3	**GTX**	**711**	**(Germany) Proton Competition**	**(United States) Dominique Bastien** **(Thailand) Vutthikorn Inthraphuvasak** **(Germany) Christian Ried**	**Porsche 911 RSR**	**1:44.522**	**28**
4	**991**	**909**	**(Luxembourg) DUWO Racing**	**(Russia) Andrey Mukovoz** **(Russia) Sergey Peregudov** **(Russia) Stanislav Sidoruk**	**Porsche 991 GT3 Cup II**	**1:48.633**	**21**
5	991	991	(Netherlands) NKPP Racing by Bas Koeten Racing	(Netherlands) Gijs Bessem (Netherlands) Harry Hilders (Netherlands) Marcel van Berlo	Porsche 991 GT3 Cup II	1:48.781	36
6	**TCR**	**1**	**(Switzerland) Autorama Motorsport by Wolf-Power Racing**	**(Austria) Constantin Kletzer** **(Switzerland) Christopher Lenz** **(United Kingdom) Rhys Lloyd** **(Switzerland) Yannick Mettler** **(Switzerland) Jasmin Preisig**	**Volkswagen Golf GTI TCR**	**1:51.665**	**21**
7	TCR	112	(Switzerland) Autorama Motorsport by Wolf-Power Racing	(Switzerland) Miklas Born (Italy) Roberto Ferri (Germany) Benjamin Leuchter (Germany) Marek Schaller (Italy) Alberto Vescovi	Volkswagen Golf GTI TCR	1:52.162	25
8	**TCX**	**226**	**(France) Nordschleife Racing**	**(France) Guillaume Roman** **(Canada) Michel Sallenbach** **(France) Daniel Waszczinski**	**Ligier JS2 R**	**1:52.445**	**12**
9	TCR	131	(Switzerland) TOPCAR Sport	(Switzerland) Fabian Danz (Switzerland) Karen Gaillard (Germany) Kai Jordan	CUPRA León TCR	1:52.456	26
10	**GT4**	**451**	**(Germany) Team Avia Sorg Rennsport**	**(Germany) Björn Simon** **(Spain) José Manuel de los Milagros** **(Germany) Heiko Eichenberg** **(Germany) Olaf Meyer**	**BMW M4 GT4**	**1:53.043**	**33**
11	GT4	401	(Germany) PROsport Performance AMR	(Belgium) Rodrigue Gillion (Belgium) Tom Heeren (Belgium) Nico Verdonck	Aston Martin Vantage AMR GT4	1:54.166	24
12	TCR	101	(Netherlands) Red Camel-Jordans.nl	(Netherlands) Ivo Breukers (Netherlands) Luc Breukers	CUPRA León TCR	1:54.225	30
13	991	978	(Belgium) Speed Lover	(United States) Dominique Bastien (France) Eric Mouez (Netherlands) Jeroen Kreeft (Belgium) Rolf Lietart	Porsche 991 GT3 Cup II	1:54.320	17
14	TCX	240	(Netherlands) DayVTec Engineering	(Netherlands) Tim Coronel (Netherlands) Jan Jaap van Roon (Netherlands) Gaby Uljee	BMW M240i Cup	1:56.689	38
15	TCR	188	(Belgium) AC Motorsport	(Belgium) Mathieu Detry (France) Stéphane Perrin (Belgium) Vincent Radermecker	Audi RS 3 LMS TCR		

=== Qualifying ===
==== GT ====
Fastest in class in bold.

Pos	Class	No.	Team	Drivers	Car	Time	Laps
1	**GT3-Am**	**9**	**(Netherlands) Equipe Verschuur**	**(Netherlands) Harrie Kolen** **(Netherlands) Erik van Loon** **(Netherlands) Mike Verschuur**	**Renault R.S. 01 FGT3**	**1:39.288**	**11**
2	GT3-Am	85	(United States) CP Racing	(United States) Charles Espenlaub (United States) Joe Foster (United States) Shane Lewis (United States) Charles Putman	Mercedes-AMG GT3 Evo	1:40.277	7
3	**991**	**909**	**(Luxembourg) DUWO Racing**	**(Russia) Andrey Mukovoz** **(Russia) Sergey Peregudov** **(Russia) Stanislav Sidoruk**	**Porsche 991 GT3 Cup II**	**1:46.116**	**6**
4	991	991	(Netherlands) NKPP Racing by Bas Koeten Racing	(Netherlands) Gijs Bessem (Netherlands) Harry Hilders (Netherlands) Marcel van Berlo	Porsche 991 GT3 Cup II	1:47.372	15
5	991	978	(Belgium) Speed Lover	(United States) Dominique Bastien (France) Eric Mouez (Netherlands) Jeroen Kreeft (Belgium) Rolf Lietart	Porsche 991 GT3 Cup II	1:48.922	12
6	**GT4**	**401**	**(Germany) PROsport Performance AMR**	**(Belgium) Rodrigue Gillion** **(Belgium) Tom Heeren** **(Belgium) Nico Verdonck**	**Aston Martin Vantage AMR GT4**	**1:49.885**	**5**
7	GT4	451	(Germany) Team Avia Sorg Rennsport	(Germany) Björn Simon (Spain) José Manuel de los Milagros (Germany) Heiko Eichenberg (Germany) Olaf Meyer	BMW M4 GT4	1:50.672	11
8	**GTX**	**711**	**(Germany) Proton Competition**	**(United States) Dominique Bastien** **(Thailand) Vutthikorn Inthraphuvasak** **(Germany) Christian Ried**	**Porsche 911 RSR**		

==== TCE ====
Fastest in class in bold.

Pos	Class	No.	Team	Drivers	Car	Time	Laps
1	**TCR**	**112**	**(Switzerland) Autorama Motorsport by Wolf-Power Racing**	**(Switzerland) Miklas Born** **(Italy) Roberto Ferri** **(Germany) Benjamin Leuchter** **(Germany) Marek Schaller** **(Italy) Alberto Vescovi**	**Volkswagen Golf GTI TCR**	**1:49.666**	**10**
2	TCR	131	(Switzerland) TOPCAR Sport	(Switzerland) Fabian Danz (Switzerland) Karen Gaillard (Germany) Kai Jordan	CUPRA León TCR	1:50.595	15
3	TCR	101	(Netherlands) Red Camel-Jordans.nl	(Netherlands) Ivo Breukers (Netherlands) Luc Breukers	CUPRA León TCR	1:51.042	11
4	TCR	1	(Switzerland) Autorama Motorsport by Wolf-Power Racing	(Austria) Constantin Kletzer (Switzerland) Christopher Lenz (United Kingdom) Rhys Lloyd (Switzerland) Yannick Mettler (Switzerland) Jasmin Preisig	Volkswagen Golf GTI TCR	1:51.179	11
5	TCR	188	(Belgium) AC Motorsport	(Belgium) Mathieu Detry (France) Stéphane Perrin (Belgium) Vincent Radermecker	Audi RS 3 LMS TCR	1:52.037	14
6	**TCX**	**240**	**(Netherlands) DayVTec Engineering**	**(Netherlands) Tim Coronel** **(Netherlands) Jan Jaap van Roon** **(Netherlands) Gaby Uljee**	**BMW M240i Cup**	**1:54.057**	**12**
7	TCX	226	(France) Nordschleife Racing	(France) Guillaume Roman (Canada) Michel Sallenbach (France) Daniel Waszczinski	Ligier JS2 R		

=== Race ===
==== Part 1 ====
Class winner in bold.

Pos	Class	No.	Team	Drivers	Car	Time/Reason	Laps
1	**GT3-Am**	**85**	**(United States) CP Racing**	**(United States) Charles Espenlaub** **(United States) Joe Foster** **(United States) Shane Lewis** **(United States) Charles Putman**	**Mercedes-AMG GT3 Evo**	**8:00:06.915**	**236**
2	**991**	**909**	**(Luxembourg) DUWO Racing**	**(Russia) Andrey Mukovoz** **(Russia) Sergey Peregudov** **(Russia) Stanislav Sidoruk**	**Porsche 991 GT3 Cup II**	**+6 Laps**	**230**
3	991	991	(Netherlands) NKPP Racing by Bas Koeten Racing	(Netherlands) Gijs Bessem (Netherlands) Harry Hilders (Netherlands) Marcel van Berlo	Porsche 991 GT3 Cup II	+6 Laps	230
4	**TCR**	**131**	**(Switzerland) TOPCAR Sport**	**(Switzerland) Fabian Danz** **(Switzerland) Karen Gaillard** **(Germany) Kai Jordan**	**CUPRA León TCR**	**+15 Laps**	**221**
5	TCR	1	(Switzerland) Autorama Motorsport by Wolf-Power Racing	(Austria) Constantin Kletzer (Switzerland) Christopher Lenz (United Kingdom) Rhys Lloyd (Switzerland) Yannick Mettler (Switzerland) Jasmin Preisig	Volkswagen Golf GTI TCR	+16 Laps	220
6	TCR	112	(Switzerland) Autorama Motorsport by Wolf-Power Racing	(Switzerland) Miklas Born (Italy) Roberto Ferri (Germany) Benjamin Leuchter (Germany) Marek Schaller (Italy) Alberto Vescovi	Volkswagen Golf GTI TCR	+17 Laps	219
7	TCR	188	(Belgium) AC Motorsport	(Belgium) Mathieu Detry (France) Stéphane Perrin (Belgium) Vincent Radermecker	Audi RS 3 LMS TCR	+20 Laps	216
8	**GT4**	**451**	**(Germany) Team Avia Sorg Rennsport**	**(Germany) Björn Simon** **(Spain) José Manuel de los Milagros** **(Germany) Heiko Eichenberg** **(Germany) Olaf Meyer**	**BMW M4 GT4**	**+20 Laps**	**216**
9	**TCX**	**240**	**(Netherlands) DayVTec Engineering**	**(Netherlands) Tim Coronel** **(Netherlands) Jan Jaap van Roon** **(Netherlands) Gaby Uljee**	**BMW M240i Cup**	**+24 Laps**	**212**
10	GT4	401	(Germany) PROsport Performance AMR	(Belgium) Rodrigue Gillion (Belgium) Tom Heeren (Belgium) Nico Verdonck	Aston Martin Vantage AMR GT4	+24 Laps	212
11	TCX	226	(France) Nordschleife Racing	(France) Guillaume Roman (Canada) Michel Sallenbach (France) Daniel Waszczinski	Ligier JS2 R	+25 Laps	211
12 DNF	GT3-Am	9	(Netherlands) Equipe Verschuur	(Netherlands) Harrie Kolen (Netherlands) Erik van Loon (Netherlands) Mike Verschuur	Renault R.S. 01 FGT3	Driveshaft	193
13	TCR	101	(Netherlands) Red Camel-Jordans.nl	(Netherlands) Ivo Breukers (Netherlands) Luc Breukers	CUPRA León TCR	+53 Laps	183
14	991	978	(Belgium) Speed Lover	(United States) Dominique Bastien (France) Eric Mouez (Netherlands) Jeroen Kreeft (Belgium) Rolf Lietart	Porsche 991 GT3 Cup II	+61 Laps	175
DNS	GTX	711	(Germany) Proton Competition	(United States) Dominique Bastien (Thailand) Vutthikorn Inthraphuvasak (Germany) Christian Ried	Porsche 911 RSR	Practice only	

==== Part 2 ====
Class winner in bold.

Pos	Class	No.	Team	Drivers	Car	Time/Reason	Laps
1	**991**	**991**	**(Netherlands) NKPP Racing by Bas Koeten Racing**	**(Netherlands) Gijs Bessem** **(Netherlands) Harry Hilders** **(Netherlands) Marcel van Berlo**	**Porsche 991 GT3 Cup II**	**8:01:40.408**	**470**
2	991	909	(Luxembourg) DUWO Racing	(Russia) Andrey Mukovoz (Russia) Sergey Peregudov (Russia) Stanislav Sidoruk	Porsche 991 GT3 Cup II	+1:46.659	470
3	**TCR**	**1**	**(Switzerland) Autorama Motorsport by Wolf-Power Racing**	**(Austria) Constantin Kletzer** **(Switzerland) Christopher Lenz** **(United Kingdom) Rhys Lloyd** **(Switzerland) Yannick Mettler** **(Switzerland) Jasmin Preisig**	**Volkswagen Golf GTI TCR**	**+20 Laps**	**450**
4	TCR	112	(Switzerland) Autorama Motorsport by Wolf-Power Racing	(Switzerland) Miklas Born (Italy) Roberto Ferri (Germany) Benjamin Leuchter (Germany) Marek Schaller (Italy) Alberto Vescovi	Volkswagen Golf GTI TCR	+21 Laps	449
5	TCR	131	(Switzerland) TOPCAR Sport	(Switzerland) Fabian Danz (Switzerland) Karen Gaillard (Germany) Kai Jordan	CUPRA León TCR	+21 Laps	449
6	**GT4**	**451**	**(Germany) Team Avia Sorg Rennsport**	**(Germany) Björn Simon** **(Spain) José Manuel de los Milagros** **(Germany) Heiko Eichenberg** **(Germany) Olaf Meyer**	**BMW M4 GT4**	**+28 Laps**	**442**
7	**GT3-Am**	**85**	**(United States) CP Racing**	**(United States) Charles Espenlaub** **(United States) Joe Foster** **(United States) Shane Lewis** **(United States) Charles Putman**	**Mercedes-AMG GT3 Evo**	**+28 Laps**	**442**
8	**TCX**	**240**	**(Netherlands) DayVTec Engineering**	**(Netherlands) Tim Coronel** **(Netherlands) Jan Jaap van Roon** **(Netherlands) Gaby Uljee**	**BMW M240i Cup**	**+36 Laps**	**434**
9	TCX	226	(France) Nordschleife Racing	(France) Guillaume Roman (Canada) Michel Sallenbach (France) Daniel Waszczinski	Ligier JS2 R	+38 Laps	432
10	GT4	401	(Germany) PROsport Performance AMR	(Belgium) Rodrigue Gillion (Belgium) Tom Heeren (Belgium) Nico Verdonck	Aston Martin Vantage AMR GT4	+54 Laps	416
11	TCR	101	(Netherlands) Red Camel-Jordans.nl	(Netherlands) Ivo Breukers (Netherlands) Luc Breukers	CUPRA León TCR	+64 Laps	406
12	991	978	(Belgium) Speed Lover	(United States) Dominique Bastien (France) Eric Mouez (Netherlands) Jeroen Kreeft (Belgium) Rolf Lietart	Porsche 991 GT3 Cup II	+77 Laps	393
13 DNF	TCR	188	(Belgium) AC Motorsport	(Belgium) Mathieu Detry (France) Stéphane Perrin (Belgium) Vincent Radermecker	Audi RS 3 LMS TCR	+166 Laps	304
DNF	GT3-Am	9	(Netherlands) Equipe Verschuur	(Netherlands) Harrie Kolen (Netherlands) Erik van Loon (Netherlands) Mike Verschuur	Renault R.S. 01 FGT3	Driveshaft	259
DNS	GTX	711	(Germany) Proton Competition	(United States) Dominique Bastien (Thailand) Vutthikorn Inthraphuvasak (Germany) Christian Ried	Porsche 911 RSR	Practice only	

24H Series
Previous race: 12 Hours of Monza	2020 season	Next race: Coppa Florio
