= 2020 24H TCE Series =

Car endurance racing series

The 2020 24H Touring Car Endurance Series powered by Hankook was the fifth season of the Touring Car Endurance Series (TCES). Creventic was the organiser and promoter of the series. The races were contested with touring cars.

== Calendar ==
Round	Event	Circuit	Date	Report
1	Dubai 24 Hour	Dubai Autodrome, Dubai, United Arab Emirates	9–11 January	Report
2	24 Hours of Portimão	Algarve International Circuit, Portimão, Portugal	12–14 June	Report
3	12 Hours of Monza	Autodromo Nazionale di Monza, Monza, Italy	10–11 July	Report
4	16 Hours of Hockenheimring	Hockenheimring, Hockenheim, Germany	4–6 September	Report
5	Coppa Florio 12 Hours of Sicily	Autodromo di Pergusa, Pergusa, Italy	9–11 October	Report
6	12 Hours of Mugello	Mugello Circuit, Scarperia e San Piero, Italy	13–15 November	Report
Cancelled due to the 2019-20 coronavirus pandemic
Event		Circuit		Original Date
12 Hours of Spa-Francorchamps		Circuit de Spa-Francorchamps, Spa, Belgium		1-2 May
9 Hours of Castellet		Circuit Paul Ricard, Le Castellet, France		9-10 July
24 Hours of Barcelona		Circuit de Barcelona-Catalunya, Montmeló, Spain		4-6 September
12 Hours of Imola		Autodromo Enzo e Dino Ferrari, Imola, Italy		9-10 October
24 Hours of the Circuit of the Americas		Circuit of the Americas, Austin, United States		13-15 November
12 Hours of Zandvoort		Circuit Zandvoort, Zandvoort, Netherlands		13-15 November

Race is part of the Championship of the Continents
Race is part of the European Championship
Race is part of both the Championship of the Continents and the European Championship

== Entry list ==
TCR
Team	Car	No.	Drivers	Rounds
(Switzerland) Autorama Motorsport by Wolf-Power Racing	Volkswagen Golf GTI TCR	1	(Switzerland) Yannick Mettler	1–4, 6
(Switzerland) Autorama Motorsport by Wolf-Power Racing	Volkswagen Golf GTI TCR	1	(Belgium) Mathieu Detry	1
(Switzerland) Autorama Motorsport by Wolf-Power Racing	Volkswagen Golf GTI TCR	1	(Denmark) Kim Holmgaard	1
(Switzerland) Autorama Motorsport by Wolf-Power Racing	Volkswagen Golf GTI TCR	1	(Italy) Felice Jelmini	1
(Switzerland) Autorama Motorsport by Wolf-Power Racing	Volkswagen Golf GTI TCR	1	(Denmark) Martin Vedel	1
(Switzerland) Autorama Motorsport by Wolf-Power Racing	Volkswagen Golf GTI TCR	1	(Switzerland) Jasmin Preisig	2, 4, 6
(Switzerland) Autorama Motorsport by Wolf-Power Racing	Volkswagen Golf GTI TCR	1	(Switzerland) Christopher Lenz	2, 4
(Switzerland) Autorama Motorsport by Wolf-Power Racing	Volkswagen Golf GTI TCR	1	(Switzerland) Stefan Tanner	2, 6
(Switzerland) Autorama Motorsport by Wolf-Power Racing	Volkswagen Golf GTI TCR	1	(Switzerland) Jérome Ogay	2
(Switzerland) Autorama Motorsport by Wolf-Power Racing	Volkswagen Golf GTI TCR	1	(Italy) Roberto Ferri	3
(Switzerland) Autorama Motorsport by Wolf-Power Racing	Volkswagen Golf GTI TCR	1	(Italy) Sandro Pelatti	3
(Switzerland) Autorama Motorsport by Wolf-Power Racing	Volkswagen Golf GTI TCR	1	(Italy) Alberto Vescovi	3
(Switzerland) Autorama Motorsport by Wolf-Power Racing	Volkswagen Golf GTI TCR	1	(Austria) Constantin Kletzer	4, 6
(Switzerland) Autorama Motorsport by Wolf-Power Racing	Volkswagen Golf GTI TCR	1	(United Kingdom) Rhys Lloyd	4
(Switzerland) Autorama Motorsport by Wolf-Power Racing	Volkswagen Golf GTI TCR	1	(Switzerland) Philipp Hagnauer	6
(Switzerland) Autorama Motorsport by Wolf-Power Racing	Volkswagen Golf GTI TCR	112	(Switzerland) Miklas Born	All
(Switzerland) Autorama Motorsport by Wolf-Power Racing	Volkswagen Golf GTI TCR	112	(Switzerland) Yannick Mettler	1–3, 6
(Switzerland) Autorama Motorsport by Wolf-Power Racing	Volkswagen Golf GTI TCR	112	(Italy) Roberto Ferri	1–2, 4, 6
(Switzerland) Autorama Motorsport by Wolf-Power Racing	Volkswagen Golf GTI TCR	112	(Austria) Constantin Kletzer	1, 3, 5
(Switzerland) Autorama Motorsport by Wolf-Power Racing	Volkswagen Golf GTI TCR	112	(Italy) Alberto Vescovi	1, 4, 6
(Switzerland) Autorama Motorsport by Wolf-Power Racing	Volkswagen Golf GTI TCR	112	(Finland) Antti Buri	2
(Switzerland) Autorama Motorsport by Wolf-Power Racing	Volkswagen Golf GTI TCR	112	(Finland) Kari-Pekka Laaksonen	2
(Switzerland) Autorama Motorsport by Wolf-Power Racing	Volkswagen Golf GTI TCR	112	(Germany) Benjamin Leuchter	4
(Switzerland) Autorama Motorsport by Wolf-Power Racing	Volkswagen Golf GTI TCR	112	(Germany) Marek Schaller	4
(Switzerland) Autorama Motorsport by Wolf-Power Racing	Volkswagen Golf GTI TCR	112	(Switzerland) Fabian Danz	5
(Netherlands) Red Camel-Jordans.nl	CUPRA León TCR	101	(Netherlands) Ivo Breukers	All
(Netherlands) Red Camel-Jordans.nl	CUPRA León TCR	101	(Canada) Jerimy Daniel	1
(Netherlands) Red Camel-Jordans.nl	CUPRA León TCR	101	(Canada) Jean-Francois Hevey	1
(Netherlands) Red Camel-Jordans.nl	CUPRA León TCR	101	(Germany) Henry Littig	1
(Netherlands) Red Camel-Jordans.nl	CUPRA León TCR	101	(Netherlands) Luc Breukers	2–6
(Netherlands) Red Camel-Jordans.nl	CUPRA León TCR	101	(Netherlands) Ric Breukers	2
(Netherlands) Red Camel-Jordans.nl	CUPRA León TCR	101	(United Kingdom) Steven Liquorish	4
(Germany) Vmax Engineering	Opel Astra TCR	105	(United States) Charles Espenlaub	5
(Germany) Vmax Engineering	Opel Astra TCR	105	(United States) Shane Lewis	5
(Thailand) BBR - Billionaire Boys Racing	CUPRA León TCR	107	(Thailand) Anusorn Asiralertsiri	1
(Thailand) BBR - Billionaire Boys Racing	CUPRA León TCR	107	(Thailand) Kantadhee Kusiri	1
(Thailand) BBR - Billionaire Boys Racing	CUPRA León TCR	107	(Thailand) Kantasak Kusiri	1
(Thailand) BBR - Billionaire Boys Racing	CUPRA León TCR	107	(Thailand) Chariya Nuya	1
(Thailand) BBR - Billionaire Boys Racing	CUPRA León TCR	107	(Thailand) Munkong Sathienthirakul	1
(Sweden) Lestrup Racing Team	Volkswagen Golf GTI TCR	110	(Sweden) Christian Axelsson	1
(Sweden) Lestrup Racing Team	Volkswagen Golf GTI TCR	110	(Sweden) Peter Fahlström	1
(Sweden) Lestrup Racing Team	Volkswagen Golf GTI TCR	110	(Sweden) Mats Olsson	1
(Sweden) Lestrup Racing Team	Volkswagen Golf GTI TCR	110	(Sweden) Stefan Nilsson	1
(Sweden) Lestrup Racing Team	Volkswagen Golf GTI TCR	111	(Sweden) Marcus Fluch	1
(Sweden) Lestrup Racing Team	Volkswagen Golf GTI TCR	111	(Sweden) Hannes Morin	1
(Sweden) Lestrup Racing Team	Volkswagen Golf GTI TCR	111	(Sweden) Martin Öhlin	1
(Sweden) Lestrup Racing Team	Volkswagen Golf GTI TCR	111	(Sweden) Oliver Söderström	1
(United Arab Emirates) Atech Racing	SEAT León TCR	116	(United Kingdom) Colin Boyle	1
(United Arab Emirates) Atech Racing	SEAT León TCR	116	(Australia) Peter England	1
(United Arab Emirates) Atech Racing	SEAT León TCR	116	(United Kingdom) Julian Griffin	1
(United Arab Emirates) Atech Racing	SEAT León TCR	116	(United Kingdom) Will Morrison	1
(Belgium) Audi Sport Team Comtoyou	Audi RS 3 LMS TCR	117	(France) Nathanaël Berthon	2
(Belgium) Audi Sport Team Comtoyou	Audi RS 3 LMS TCR	117	(Belgium) Nicolas Baert	2
(Belgium) Audi Sport Team Comtoyou	Audi RS 3 LMS TCR	117	(Netherlands) Tom Coronel	2
(Hong Kong) KCMG	Honda Civic Type R TCR (FK8)	122	(Hong Kong) Jim Ka To	1
(Hong Kong) KCMG	Honda Civic Type R TCR (FK8)	122	(Hong Kong) Paul Ip	1
(Hong Kong) KCMG	Honda Civic Type R TCR (FK8)	122	(Hong Kong) Kenneth Ma	1
(Hong Kong) KCMG	Honda Civic Type R TCR (FK8)	122	(Hong Kong) Henry Lee Jr.	1
(Hong Kong) KCMG	Honda Civic Type R TCR (FK8)	122	(Hong Kong) Andy Yan	1
(Slovakia) Brutal Fish Racing Team by KCMG	Honda Civic Type R TCR (FK8)	122	(United Kingdom) Daniel Lloyd	3
(Slovakia) Brutal Fish Racing Team by KCMG	Honda Civic Type R TCR (FK8)	122	(Spain) Pepe Oriola	3
(Slovakia) Brutal Fish Racing Team by KCMG	Honda Civic Type R TCR (FK8)	122	(Slovakia) Martin Ryba	3
(France) Code Racing Development	Volkswagen Golf GTI TCR	124	(France) Philippe Baffoun	2
(France) Code Racing Development	Volkswagen Golf GTI TCR	124	(France) Thierry Boyer	2
(France) Code Racing Development	Volkswagen Golf GTI TCR	124	(France) Thierry Chkondali	2
(France) Code Racing Development	Volkswagen Golf GTI TCR	124	(France) Bruno Derossi	2
(France) Code Racing Development	Volkswagen Golf GTI TCR	124	(France) Quentin Giordano	2
(Switzerland) TOPCAR sport by Bas Koeten Racing	CUPRA León TCR	131	(Switzerland) Fabian Danz	1, 3–4, 6
(Switzerland) TOPCAR sport by Bas Koeten Racing	CUPRA León TCR	131	(Switzerland) Ronny Jost	1
(Switzerland) TOPCAR sport by Bas Koeten Racing	CUPRA León TCR	131	(Finland) Antti Buri	1
(Switzerland) TOPCAR sport by Bas Koeten Racing	CUPRA León TCR	131	(Finland) Kari-Pekka Laaksonen	1, 6
(Switzerland) TOPCAR sport by Bas Koeten Racing	CUPRA León TCR	131	(Switzerland) Karen Gaillard	3–4
(Switzerland) TOPCAR sport by Bas Koeten Racing	CUPRA León TCR	131	(Germany) Loris Prattes	3
(Switzerland) TOPCAR sport by Bas Koeten Racing	CUPRA León TCR	131	(Germany) Kai Jordan	4
(Switzerland) TOPCAR sport by Bas Koeten Racing	CUPRA León TCR	131	(Switzerland) Adrian Spescha	6
(Netherlands) NKPP Racing by Bas Koeten Racing	CUPRA León TCR	175	(Netherlands) Gijs Bessem	1, 3, 6
(Netherlands) NKPP Racing by Bas Koeten Racing	CUPRA León TCR	175	(Netherlands) Harry Hilders	1, 3, 6
(Netherlands) NKPP Racing by Bas Koeten Racing	CUPRA León TCR	175	(Netherlands) Bob Herber	1
(Netherlands) NKPP Racing by Bas Koeten Racing	CUPRA León TCR	175	(Netherlands) Willem Meijer	1
(Hungary) Zengő Motorsport	CUPRA León TCR	133	(Hungary) Tamas Horvath	1
(Hungary) Zengő Motorsport	CUPRA León TCR	133	(Hungary) Gabor Kismarty-Lechner	1
(Hungary) Zengő Motorsport	CUPRA León TCR	133	(Hungary) Csaba Tóth	1
(Hungary) Zengő Motorsport	CUPRA León TCR	133	(Hungary) Zoltán Zengő	1
(Hungary) Zengő Motorsport	CUPRA León TCR	133	(Hungary) Ga'l Szabolcs	1
(Germany) Bonk Motorsport	Audi RS 3 LMS TCR	169	(Germany) Michael Bonk	1
(Germany) Bonk Motorsport	Audi RS 3 LMS TCR	169	(Germany) Michael Mayer	1
(Germany) Bonk Motorsport	Audi RS 3 LMS TCR	169	(Germany) Andreas Möntmann	1
(Germany) Bonk Motorsport	Audi RS 3 LMS TCR	169	(Germany) Hermann Bock	1
(Belgium) AC Motorsport	Audi RS 3 LMS TCR	188	(France) Stéphane Perrin	1–4, 6
(Belgium) AC Motorsport	Audi RS 3 LMS TCR	188	(Belgium) Vincent Radermecker	1, 3–4
(Belgium) AC Motorsport	Audi RS 3 LMS TCR	188	(Belgium) Tom Boonen	1
(Belgium) AC Motorsport	Audi RS 3 LMS TCR	188	(Belgium) Gilles Magnus	1
(Belgium) AC Motorsport	Audi RS 3 LMS TCR	188	(Canada) Matthew Taskinen	1
(Belgium) AC Motorsport	Audi RS 3 LMS TCR	188	(France) Michael Blanchemain	2
(Belgium) AC Motorsport	Audi RS 3 LMS TCR	188	(France) Christophe Hamon	2
(Belgium) AC Motorsport	Audi RS 3 LMS TCR	188	(Sweden) Hannes Morin	2
(Belgium) AC Motorsport	Audi RS 3 LMS TCR	188	(Belgium) Mathieu Detry	3–4, 6
(Belgium) AC Motorsport	Audi RS 3 LMS TCR	188	(United Kingdom) James Kaye	5–6
(Belgium) AC Motorsport	Audi RS 3 LMS TCR	188	(United Kingdom) Ricky Coomber	5
(Belgium) AC Motorsport	Audi RS 3 LMS TCR	188	(Germany) Marcus Menden	5
TCX
Team	Car	No.	Drivers	Rounds
(Switzerland) Autorama Motorsport	SEAT León Cup Racer	211	(Switzerland) Armando Stanco	3
(Switzerland) Autorama Motorsport	SEAT León Cup Racer	211	(Switzerland) Dario Stanco	3
(Switzerland) Autorama Motorsport	SEAT León Cup Racer	211	(Switzerland) Luigi Stanco	3
(France) Nordschleife Racing	Ligier JS2 R	226	(France) Guillaume Roman	1, 4, 6
(France) Nordschleife Racing	Ligier JS2 R	226	(Canada) Michel Sallenbach	1, 4
(France) Nordschleife Racing	Ligier JS2 R	226	(France) Thierry Blaise	1
(France) Nordschleife Racing	Ligier JS2 R	226	(France) François Riaux	1
(France) Nordschleife Racing	Ligier JS2 R	226	(France) Daniel Waszczinski	3–4, 6
(France) Nordschleife Racing	Ligier JS2 R	226	(France) Johan Boris Scheier	3
(France) Nordschleife Racing	Ligier JS2 R	226	(France) Régis Rego de Sebes	3
(France) Nordschleife Racing	Ligier JS2 R	226	(France) Mathieu Sentis	6
(Netherlands) DayVTec Engineering	BMW M240i Cup	240	(Netherlands) Tim Coronel	4
(Netherlands) DayVTec Engineering	BMW M240i Cup	240	(Netherlands) Jan Jaap van Roon	4
(Netherlands) DayVTec Engineering	BMW M240i Cup	240	(Netherlands) Gaby Uljee	4
(United Kingdom) CWS Engineering	Ginetta G55 Supercup	278	(South Africa) Bradley Scorer	1
(United Kingdom) CWS Engineering	Ginetta G55 Supercup	278	(United Kingdom) Colin White	1
(United Kingdom) CWS Engineering	Ginetta G55 Supercup	278	(United Kingdom) Fraser Robertson	1
(United Kingdom) CWS Engineering	Ginetta G55 Supercup	278	(United States) Jean-Francois Brunot	1
(United Kingdom) CWS Engineering	Ginetta G55 Supercup	278	(United Kingdom) Adam Hatfield	1
(United States) Team ACP - Tangerine Associates	BMW M240i Racing Cup	321	(United States) Damon Danieli	1
(United States) Team ACP - Tangerine Associates	BMW M240i Racing Cup	321	(United States) Ken Goldberg	1
(United States) Team ACP - Tangerine Associates	BMW M240i Racing Cup	321	(United States) Catesby Jones	1
(United States) Team ACP - Tangerine Associates	BMW M240i Racing Cup	321	(United States) Jim Norman	1
(United Kingdom) WEC Motorsport	BMW M3 E46	339	(United Kingdom) Dave Cox	3
(United Kingdom) WEC Motorsport	BMW M3 E46	339	(United Kingdom) Jason Cox	3
(United Kingdom) WEC Motorsport	BMW M3 E46	339	(United Kingdom) George Haynes	3
(Netherlands) JR Motorsport	BMW M3 E92	703	(Netherlands) Ted van Vliet	5–6
(Netherlands) JR Motorsport	BMW M3 E92	703	(Netherlands) Willem Meijer	5
(Netherlands) JR Motorsport	BMW M3 E92	703	(Netherlands) Oscar Graper	6
TC
Team	Car	No.	Drivers	Rounds
(France) Nordschleife Racing	Peugeot 308 Racing Cup	172	(France) Philippe Baffoun	1
(France) Nordschleife Racing	Peugeot 308 Racing Cup	172	(France) Thierry Boyer	1
(France) Nordschleife Racing	Peugeot 308 Racing Cup	172	(France) Thierry Chkondali	1
(France) Nordschleife Racing	Peugeot 308 Racing Cup	172	(France) Bruno Derossi	1
(France) Nordschleife Racing	Peugeot 308 Racing Cup	172	(United Kingdom) Rhys Lloyd	1
(Germany) fun-M Motorsport	BMW M240i Racing Cup	302	(United States) Oscar Jackson	1
(Germany) fun-M Motorsport	BMW M240i Racing Cup	302	(United States) Vincent Piemonte	1
(Germany) fun-M Motorsport	BMW M240i Racing Cup	302	(Belgium) Recep Sari	1
(Germany) fun-M Motorsport	BMW M240i Racing Cup	302	(Switzerland) Gustavo Xavier	1
(Germany) fun-M Motorsport	BMW M240i Racing Cup	302	(Germany) Eric Zimmermann	1
(Germany) Team Avia Sorg Rennsport	BMW M240i Racing Cup	351	(Denmark) Johan Schwartz	1
(Germany) Team Avia Sorg Rennsport	BMW M240i Racing Cup	351	(Mexico) Benito Tagle	1
(Germany) Team Avia Sorg Rennsport	BMW M240i Racing Cup	351	(United States) Skip Woody	1
(Germany) Team Avia Sorg Rennsport	BMW M240i Racing Cup	351	(United States) Mark Brummond	1

== Race results ==
Bold indicates overall winner.

Classes	(United Arab Emirates) 24H Dubai Round 1	(Portugal) 24H Portimão Round 2	(Italy) 12H Monza Round 3	(Germany) 16H Hockenheimring Round 4	(Italy) 12H Pergusa Round 5	(Italy) 12H Mugello Round 6
TCR Winners	**(Belgium) No. 188 AC Motorsport**	**(Switzerland) No. 112 Autorama Motorsport by Wolf-Power Racing**	**(Netherlands) No. 101 Red Camel-Jordans.nl**	**(Switzerland) No. 1 Autorama Motorsport by Wolf-Power Racing**	**(Switzerland) No. 112 Autorama Motorsport by Wolf-Power Racing**	**(Switzerland) No. 112 Autorama Motorsport by Wolf-Power Racing**
TCR Winners	**(Belgium) Tom Boonen** **(Belgium) Gilles Magnus** **(France) Stéphane Perrin** **(Belgium) Vincent Radermecker** **(Canada) Matthew Taskinen**	**(Switzerland) Miklas Born** **(Finland) Antti Buri** **(Italy) Roberto Ferri** **(Finland) Kari-Pekka Laaksonen** **(Switzerland) Yannick Mettler**	**(Netherlands) Ivo Breukers** **(Netherlands) Luc Breukers**	**(Austria) Constantin Kletzer** **(Switzerland) Christopher Lenz** **(United Kingdom) Rhys Lloyd** **(Switzerland) Yannick Mettler** **(Switzerland) Jasmin Preisig**	**(Switzerland) Miklas Born** **(Switzerland) Fabian Danz** **(Austria) Constantin Kletzer**	**(Switzerland) Miklas Born** **(Italy) Roberto Ferri** **(Switzerland) Yannick Mettler** **(Italy) Alberto Vescovi**
TCX Winners	(United States) No. 321 Team ACP - Tangerine Associates	No Entrants	(Switzerland) No. 211 Autorama Motorsport	(Netherlands) No. 240 DayVTec Engineering	No Finishers	(France) No. 226 Nordschleife Racing
TCX Winners	(United States) Damon Danieli (United States) Ken Goldberg (United States) Catesby Jones (United States) Jim Norman	No Entrants	(Switzerland) Armando Stanco (Switzerland) Dario Stanco (Switzerland) Luigi Stanco	(Netherlands) Tim Coronel (Netherlands) Jan Jaap van Roon (Netherlands) Gaby Uljee	No Finishers	(France) Guillaume Roman (France) Mathieu Sentis (France) Daniel Waszczinski
TC Winners	(Germany) No. 351 Team Avia Sorg Rennsport	No Entrants	No Entrants	No Entrants	No Entrants	No Entrants
TC Winners	(Denmark) Johan Schwartz (Mexico) Benito Tagle (United States) Skip Woody (United States) Mark Brummond	No Entrants	No Entrants	No Entrants	No Entrants	No Entrants

=== Championship standings ===
==== Drivers' Overall Continents Series ====
Pos.	Drivers	Team	Class	(United Arab Emirates) DUB	(Portugal) POR	(Germany) HOC	(Italy) MUG	Pts.
1	(Switzerland) Miklas Born (Italy) Roberto Ferri	(Switzerland) No. 112 Autorama Motorsport by Wolf-Power Racing	TCR	31	4	4		77
2	(Switzerland) Yannick Mettler	(Switzerland) No. 1 Autorama Motorsport by Wolf-Power Racing	TCR	43		3		64
2	(Switzerland) Yannick Mettler	(Switzerland) No. 112 Autorama Motorsport by Wolf-Power Racing	TCR		4			64
3	(France) Stephane Perrin	(Belgium) No. 188 AC Motorsport	TCR	26	6	13		58
4	(Austria) Constantin Kletzer	(Switzerland) No. 112 Autorama Motorsport by Wolf-Power Racing	TCR	31				54
4	(Austria) Constantin Kletzer	(Switzerland) No. 1 Autorama Motorsport by Wolf-Power Racing	TCR			3		54
5	(Sweden) Hannes Morin	(Sweden) No. 111 Lestrup Racing Team	TCR	29				52
5	(Sweden) Hannes Morin	(Belgium) No. 188 AC Motorsport	TCR		6			52
6	(Finland) Antti Buri (Finland) Kari-Pekka Laaksonen	(Switzerland) No. 131 TOPCAR sport by Bas Koeten Racing	TCR	40				49
6	(Finland) Antti Buri (Finland) Kari-Pekka Laaksonen	(Switzerland) No. 112 Autorama Motorsport by Wolf-Power Racing	TCR		4			49
6	(Netherlands) Ivo Breukers	(Netherlands) No. 101 Red Camel-Jordans.nl	TCR	35	**12**	11		49
7	(Italy) Alberto Vescovi	(Switzerland) No. 112 Autorama Motorsport by Wolf-Power Racing	TCR	31		4		48
8	(Switzerland) Christopher Lenz (Switzerland) Jasmin Preisig	(Switzerland) No. 1 Autorama Motorsport by Wolf-Power Racing	TCR		10	3		46
9	(France) Guillaume Roman (Canada) Michel Sallenbach	(France) No. 226 Nordschleife Racing	TCX	60		9		38
10	(Switzerland) Fabian Danz	(Switzerland) No. 131 TOPCAR Sport	TCR	40		5		36
Pos.	Drivers	Team	Class	(United Arab Emirates) DUB	(Portugal) POR	(Germany) HOC	(Italy) MUG	Pts.

Colour	Result
Gold	Winner
Silver	Second place
Bronze	Third place
Green	Points classification
Blue	Non-points classification
Blue	Non-classified finish (NC)
Purple	Retired, not classified (Ret)
Red	Did not qualify (DNQ)
Red	Did not pre-qualify (DNPQ)
Black	Disqualified (DSQ)
White	Did not start (DNS)
White	Withdrew (WD)
White	Race cancelled (C)
Blank	Did not practice (DNP)
Blank	Did not arrive (DNA)
Blank	Excluded (EX)

**Bold** – Pole
Italics – Fastest Lap

==== Teams' Overall Continents Series ====
Pos.	Team	Class	(United Arab Emirates) DUB	(Portugal) POR	(Germany) HOC	(Italy) MUG	Pts.
1	(Switzerland) No. 112 Autorama Motorsport by Wolf-Power Racing	TCR	31	4	4		77
2	(Switzerland) No. 1 Autorama Motorsport by Wolf-Power Racing	TCR	43	10	3		64
3	(Belgium) No. 188 AC Motorsport	TCR	26	6	13		54
4	(Netherlands) No. 101 Red Camel-Jordans.nl	TCR	35	**12**	11		39
5	(France) No. 226 Nordschleife Racing	TCX	60		9		38
6	(Switzerland) No. 131 TOPCAR sport by Bas Koeten Racing	TCR	40		5		36
7	(Sweden) No. 111 Lestrup Racing Team	TCR	29				28
7	(Netherlands) No. 240 DayVTec Engineering	TCX			8		28
7	(United States) No. 111 Team ACP - Tangerine Associates	TCX	50				28
7	(Germany) No. 351 Team Avia Sorg Rennsport	TC	56				28
8	(Belgium) No. 117 Comtoyou Team Audi Sport	TCR		5			26
9	(Thailand) No. 107 BBR - Billionaire Boys Racing	TCR	39				22
9	(United Kingdom) No. 278 CWS Engineering	TCX	52				22
10	(France) No. 124 Code Racing Development	TCR		8			21
Pos.	Team	Class	(United Arab Emirates) DUB	(Portugal) POR	(Germany) HOC	(Italy) MUG	Pts.

==== TCR Drivers' Continents Series ====
Pos.	Drivers	Team	(United Arab Emirates) DUB	(Portugal) POR	(Germany) HOC	(Italy) MUG	Pts.
1	(Switzerland) Miklas Born (Italy) Roberto Ferri	(Switzerland) No. 112 Autorama Motorsport by Wolf-Power Racing	31	4	4		77
2	(Switzerland) Yannick Mettler	(Switzerland) No. 1 Autorama Motorsport by Wolf-Power Racing	43		3		64
2	(Switzerland) Yannick Mettler	(Switzerland) No. 112 Autorama Motorsport by Wolf-Power Racing		4			64
3	(France) Stephane Perrin	(Belgium) No. 188 AC Motorsport	26	6	13		54
4	(Austria) Constantin Kletzer	(Switzerland) No. 112 Autorama Motorsport by Wolf-Power Racing	31				54
4	(Austria) Constantin Kletzer	(Switzerland) No. 1 Autorama Motorsport by Wolf-Power Racing			3		54
5	(Sweden) Hannes Morin	(Sweden) No. 111 Lestrup Racing Team	29				52
5	(Sweden) Hannes Morin	(Belgium) No. 188 AC Motorsport		6			52
6	(Finland) Antti Buri (Finland) Kari-Pekka Laaksonen	(Switzerland) No. 131 TOPCAR sport by Bas Koeten Racing	40				49
6	(Finland) Antti Buri (Finland) Kari-Pekka Laaksonen	(Switzerland) No. 112 Autorama Motorsport by Wolf-Power Racing		4			49
6	(Netherlands) Ivo Breukers	(Netherlands) No. 101 Red Camel-Jordans.nl	35	**12**			49
7	(Italy) Alberto Vescovi	(Switzerland) No. 112 Autorama Motorsport by Wolf-Power Racing	31		4		48
8	(Switzerland) Christopher Lenz (Switzerland) Jasmin Preisig	(Switzerland) No. 1 Autorama Motorsport by Wolf-Power Racing		10	3		46
9	(Switzerland) Fabian Danz	(Switzerland) No. 131 TOPCAR Sport	40		5		36
10	(Belgium) Vincent Radermecker	(Belgium) No. 188 AC Motorsport	26		13		34
Pos.	Drivers	Team	(United Arab Emirates) DUB	(Portugal) POR	(Germany) HOC	(Italy) MUG	Pts.

==== TCR Teams' Continents Series ====
Pos.	Team	(United Arab Emirates) DUB	(Portugal) POR	(Germany) HOC	(Italy) MUG	Pts.
1	(Switzerland) No. 112 Autorama Motorsport by Wolf-Power Racing	31	4	4		77
2	(Switzerland) No. 1 Autorama Motorsport by Wolf-Power Racing	43	10	3		36
3	(Belgium) No. 188 AC Motorsport	26	6	13		58
4	(Netherlands) No. 101 Red Camel-Jordans.nl	35	**12**	11		49
5	(Switzerland) No. 131 TOPCAR sport by Bas Koeten Racing	40		5		36
6	(Sweden) No. 111 Lestrup Racing Team	29				28
7	(Belgium) No. 117 Comtoyou Team Audi Sport		5			26
8	(Thailand) No. 107 BBR - Billionaire Boys Racing	39				22
9	(France) No. 124 CODE Racing Development		8			21
10	(Sweden) No. 110 Lestrup Racing Team	44				16
Pos.	Team	(United Arab Emirates) DUB	(Portugal) POR	(Germany) HOC	(Italy) MUG	Pts.

==== TCX Drivers' Continents Series ====
Pos.	Drivers	Team	(United Arab Emirates) DUB	(Portugal) POR	(Germany) HOC	(Italy) MUG	Pts.
1	(France) Guillaume Roman (Canada) Michel Sallenbach	(France) No. 226 Nordschleife Racing	60		9		38
2	(France) Guillaume Roman (Canada) Michel Sallenbach	(Netherlands) No. 240 DayVTec Engineering			8		28
2	(United States) Damon Danieli (United States) Ken Goldberg (United States) Catesby Jones (United States) Jim Norman	(United States) No. 321 Team ACP - Tangerine Associates	50				28
3	(United States) Jean-François Brunot (United Kingdom) Adam Hatfield (United Kingdom) Fraser Robertson (South Africa) Bradley Scorer (United Kingdom) Colin White	(United Kingdom) No. 278 CWS Engineering	52				22
4	(France) Thierry Blaise (France) François Riaux	(France) No. 226 Nordschleife Racing	60				16
Pos.	Drivers	Team	(United Arab Emirates) DUB	(Portugal) POR	(Germany) HOC	(Italy) MUG	Pts.

==== TCX Teams' Continents Series ====
Pos.	Team	(United Arab Emirates) DUB	(Portugal) POR	(Germany) HOC	(Italy) MUG	Pts.
1	(France) No. 226 Nordschleife Racing	60		9		38
2	(Netherlands) No. 240 DayVTec Engineering			8		28
2	(United States) No. 321 Team ACP - Tangerine Associates	50				28
3	(United Kingdom) No. 278 CWS Engineering	52				22
Pos.	Team	(United Arab Emirates) DUB	(Portugal) POR	(Germany) HOC	(Italy) MUG	Pts.

==== TC Drivers' Continents Series ====
Pos.	Drivers	Team	(United Arab Emirates) DUB	(Portugal) POR	(Germany) HOC	(Italy) MUG	Pts.
1	(United States) Mark Brummond (Denmark) Johan Schwartz (Mexico) Benito Tagle (United States) Skip Woody	(Germany) No. 351 Team Avia Sorg Rennsport	56				28
2	(United States) Oscar Jackson (United States) Vincent Piemonte (Belgium) Recep Sari (Switzerland) Gustavo Xavier (Germany) Eric Zimmermann	(Germany) No. 302 fun-M Motorsport	Ret				0
2	(France) Philippe Baffoun (France) Thierry Boyer (France) Thierry Chkondali (France) Bruno Derossi (United Kingdom) Rhys Lloyd	(France) No. 172 Nordschleife Racing	DNS				0
Pos.	Drivers	Team	(United Arab Emirates) DUB	(Portugal) POR	(Germany) HOC	(Italy) MUG	Pts.

==== TC Teams' Continents Series ====
Pos.	Team	(United Arab Emirates) DUB	(Portugal) POR	(Germany) HOC	(Italy) MUG	Pts.
1	(Germany) No. 351 Team Avia Sorg Rennsport	56				28
2	(Germany) No. 302 fun-M Motorsport	Ret				0
2	(France) No. 172 Nordschleife Racing	DNS				0
Pos.	Team	(United Arab Emirates) DUB	(Portugal) POR	(Germany) HOC	(Italy) MUG	Pts.

==== Drivers' Overall Europe Series ====
Pos.	Drivers	Team	Class	(Portugal) POR	(Italy) MON	(Germany) HOC	(Italy) COP	(Italy) MUG	Pts.
1	(Switzerland) Miklas Born	(Switzerland) No. 112 Autorama Motorsport by Wolf-Power Racing	TCR	4	9	4			68
2	(Switzerland) Yannick Mettler	(Switzerland) No. 1 Autorama Motorsport by Wolf-Power Racing	TCR	10		3			63
2	(Switzerland) Yannick Mettler	(Switzerland) No. 112 Autorama Motorsport by Wolf-Power Racing	TCR		9				63
3	(Italy) Roberto Ferri	(Switzerland) No. 112 Autorama Motorsport by Wolf-Power Racing	TCR	4		4			61
3	(Italy) Roberto Ferri	(Switzerland) No. 1 Autorama Motorsport by Wolf-Power Racing	TCR		13				61
4	(Switzerland) Christopher Lenz (Switzerland) Jasmin Preisig	(Switzerland) No. 1 Autorama Motorsport by Wolf-Power Racing	TCR	10		3			46
5	(Austria) Constantin Kletzer	(Switzerland) No. 112 Autorama Motorsport by Wolf-Power Racing	TCR		9				45
5	(Austria) Constantin Kletzer	(Switzerland) No. 1 Autorama Motorsport by Wolf-Power Racing	TCR			3			45
6	(Netherlands) Ivo Breukers (Netherlands) Luc Breukers	(Netherlands) No. 101 Red Camel-Jordans.nl	TCR	**12**	8	10			44
7	(France) Daniel Waszczinski	(France) No. 226 Nordschleife Racing	TCX		20	9			33
8	(Italy) Alberto Vescovi	(Switzerland) No. 1 Autorama Motorsport by Wolf-Power Racing	TCR		18				32
8	(Italy) Alberto Vescovi	(Switzerland) No. 112 Autorama Motorsport by Wolf-Power Racing	TCR			4			32
9	(Finland) Antti Buri (Finland) Kari-Pekka Laaksonen	(Switzerland) No. 112 Autorama Motorsport by Wolf-Power Racing	TCR	4					29
10	(United Kingdom) Rhys Lloyd	(Switzerland) No. 1 Autorama Motorsport by Wolf-Power Racing	TCR			3			28
10	(Netherlands) Tim Coronel (Netherlands) Jan Jaap van Roon (Netherlands) Gaby Uljee	(Netherlands) No. 240 DayVTec Engineering	TCX			8			28
10	(Switzerland) Fabian Danz (Switzerland) Karen Gaillard	(Switzerland) No. 131 TOPCAR Sport	TCR		12	5			28
10	(France) Stéphane Perrin	(Belgium) No. 188 AC Motorsport	TCR	6	Ret	13			28
Pos.	Drivers	Team	Class	(Portugal) POR	(Italy) MON	(Germany) HOC	(Italy) COP	(Italy) MUG	Pts.

==== Teams' Overall Europe Series ====
Pos.	Team	Class	(Portugal) POR	(Italy) MON	(Germany) HOC	(Italy) COP	(Italy) MUG	Pts.
1	(Switzerland) No. 112 Autorama Motorsport by Wolf-Power Racing	TCR	4	9	4			68
2	(Switzerland) No. 1 Autorama Motorsport by Wolf-Power Racing	TCR	10	13	3			56
3	(Netherlands) No. 101 Red Camel-Jordans.nl	TCR	**12**	8	11			34
4	(France) No. 226 Nordschleife Racing	TCX		20	9			33
5	(Netherlands) No. 240 DayVTec Engineering	TCX			8			28
5	(Switzerland) No. 131 TOPCAR Sport	TCR		12	5			28
5	(Belgium) No. 188 AC Motorsport	TCR	6	Ret	13			28
6	(Belgium) No. 117 Comtoyou Team Audi Sport	TCR	5					26
7	(France) No. 124 Code Racing Development	TCR	8					21
8	(Switzerland) No. 211 Autorama Motorsport	TCX		18				18
9	(Slovakia) No. 123 Brutal Fish Racing Team	TCR		**10**				16
10	(United Kingdom) No. 339 WEC Motorsport	TCX		19				15
Pos.	Team	Class	(Portugal) POR	(Italy) MON	(Germany) HOC	(Italy) COP	(Italy) MUG	Pts.

==== TCR Drivers' Europe Series ====
Pos.	Drivers	Team	(Portugal) POR	(Italy) MON	(Germany) HOC	(Italy) COP	(Italy) MUG	Pts.
1	(Switzerland) Miklas Born	(Switzerland) No. 112 Autorama Motorsport by Wolf-Power Racing	4	9	4			68
2	(Switzerland) Yannick Mettler	(Switzerland) No. 1 Autorama Motorsport by Wolf-Power Racing	10		3			35
2	(Switzerland) Yannick Mettler	(Switzerland) No. 112 Autorama Motorsport by Wolf-Power Racing		9				35
3	(Italy) Roberto Ferri	(Switzerland) No. 112 Autorama Motorsport by Wolf-Power Racing	4		4			39
3	(Italy) Roberto Ferri	(Switzerland) No. 1 Autorama Motorsport by Wolf-Power Racing		13				39
4	(Switzerland) Christopher Lenz (Switzerland) Jasmin Preisig	(Switzerland) No. 1 Autorama Motorsport by Wolf-Power Racing	10		3			46
5	(Austria) Constantin Kletzer	(Switzerland) No. 112 Autorama Motorsport by Wolf-Power Racing		9				45
5	(Austria) Constantin Kletzer	(Switzerland) No. 1 Autorama Motorsport by Wolf-Power Racing			3			45
6	(Netherlands) Ivo Breukers (Netherlands) Luc Breukers	(Netherlands) No. 101 Red Camel-Jordans.nl	**12**	8	11			44
7	(Italy) Alberto Vescovi	(Switzerland) No. 1 Autorama Motorsport by Wolf-Power Racing		18				32
7	(Italy) Alberto Vescovi	(Switzerland) No. 112 Autorama Motorsport by Wolf-Power Racing			4			32
8	(Finland) Antti Buri (Finland) Kari-Pekka Laaksonen	(Switzerland) No. 112 Autorama Motorsport by Wolf-Power Racing	4					29
9	(United Kingdom) Rhys Lloyd	(Switzerland) No. 1 Autorama Motorsport by Wolf-Power Racing			3			28
9	(Switzerland) Fabian Danz (Switzerland) Karen Gaillard	(Switzerland) No. 131 TOPCAR Sport		12	5			28
9	(France) Stéphane Perrin	(Belgium) No. 188 AC Motorsport	6	Ret	13			28
10	(France) Nathanaël Berthon (Belgium) Nicolas Baert (Netherlands) Tom Coronel	(Belgium) No. 117 Comtoyou Team Audi Sport	5					26
Pos.	Drivers	Team	(Portugal) POR	(Italy) MON	(Germany) HOC	(Italy) COP	(Italy) MUG	Pts.

==== TCR Teams' Europe Series ====
Pos.	Team	(Portugal) POR	(Italy) MON	(Germany) HOC	(Italy) COP	(Italy) MUG	Pts.
1	(Switzerland) No. 112 Autorama Motorsport by Wolf-Power Racing	4	9	4			68
2	(Switzerland) No. 1 Autorama Motorsport by Wolf-Power Racing	10	13	3			56
3	(Netherlands) No. 101 Red Camel-Jordans.nl	**12**	8	11			34
4	(Switzerland) No. 131 TOPCAR Sport		12	5			28
4	(Belgium) No. 188 AC Motorsport	6	Ret	13			28
5	(Belgium) No. 117 Comtoyou Team Audi Sport	5					26
6	(France) No. 124 Code Racing Development	8					21
7	(Slovakia) No. 123 Brutal Fish Racing Team		**10**				16
8	(Netherlands) No. 175 NKPP Racing by Bas Koeten Racing		11				14
Pos.	Team	(Portugal) POR	(Italy) MON	(Germany) HOC	(Italy) COP	(Italy) MUG	Pts.

==== TCX Drivers' Europe Series ====
Pos.	Drivers	Team	(Portugal) POR	(Italy) MON	(Germany) HOC	(Italy) COP	(Italy) MUG	Pts.
1	(France) Daniel Waszczinski	(France) No. 226 Nordschleife Racing		20	9			33
2	(Netherlands) Tim Coronel (Netherlands) Jan Jaap van Roon (Netherlands) Gaby Uljee	(Netherlands) No. 240 DayVTec Engineering			8			28
3	(France) Guillaume Roman (Canada) Michel Sallenbach	(France) No. 226 Nordschleife Racing			9			22
4	(Switzerland) Armando Stanco (Switzerland) Dario Stanco (Switzerland) Luigi Stanco	(Switzerland) No. 211 Autorama Motorsport		18				18
5	(United Kingdom) David Cox (United Kingdom) Jason Cox (United Kingdom) George Haynes	(United Kingdom) No. 339 WEC Motorsport		19				15
6	(France) Johan Boris Scheier (France) Régis Rego de Sebes	(France) No. 226 Nordschleife Racing		20				11
Pos.	Drivers	Team	(Portugal) POR	(Italy) MON	(Germany) HOC	(Italy) COP	(Italy) MUG	Pts.

==== TCX Drivers' Europe Series ====
Pos.	Team	(Portugal) POR	(Italy) MON	(Germany) HOC	(Italy) COP	(Italy) MUG	Pts.
1	(France) No. 226 Nordschleife Racing		20	9			33
2	(Netherlands) No. 240 DayVTec Engineering			8			28
3	(Switzerland) No. 211 Autorama Motorsport		18				18
4	(United Kingdom) No. 339 WEC Motorsport		19				15
Pos.	Team	(Portugal) POR	(Italy) MON	(Germany) HOC	(Italy) COP	(Italy) MUG	Pts.

== See also ==
- 24H Series
- 2020 Dubai 24 Hour
