= 2020 Dubai 24 Hour =

The layout of the Dubai Autodrome.

The 2020 Dubai 24 Hour was the 15th running of the Dubai 24 Hour. It was also the first round of both the 2020 24H GT Series and the 2020 24H TCE Series. The event was held on 9 to 10 January at the Dubai Autodrome, United Arab Emirates. The race ran for 7 hours, 8 minutes & 49 seconds of race time and 16 hours overall before the race was red flagged due to excess rain. The track had insufficient draining for the amount of rain and after 16 hours officials declared the race official.

== Result ==
Pos	Class	No	Entrant	Drivers	Car	Laps
1	GT3-Pro	4	(Germany) Black Falcon	(United Arab Emirates) Khaled Al Qubaisi (Germany) Hubert Haupt (United Kingdom) Ben Barker (Germany) Manuel Metzger (Netherlands) Jeroen Bleekemolen	Mercedes-AMG GT3	168
2	GT3-Pro	88	(Germany) Car Collection Motorsport	(Netherlands) Rik Breukers (Germany) Christopher Haase (Germany) Mike David Ortmann (Germany) Dimitri Parhofer (Germany) Markus Winkelhock	Audi R8 LMS Evo	168
3	GT3-Pro	7	(Saudi Arabia) MS7 by WRT	(Netherlands) Rik Breukers (Saudi Arabia) Mohammed Saud Fahad Al Saud (Netherlands) Michael Vergers (Belgium) Dries Vanthoor (Germany) Christopher Mies	Audi R8 LMS Evo	168
4	GT3-Pro	91	(Germany) Herberth Motorsport	(Germany) Ralf Bohn (Germany) Robert Renauer (Germany) Alfred Renauer (Germany) Sven Müller	Porsche 911 GT3 R (991 II)	167
5	GT3-Pro	31	(Belgium) Team WRT	(Switzerland) Rolf Ineichen (Switzerland) Mark Ineichen (Italy) Mirko Bortolotti (South Africa) Kelvin van der Linde (Netherlands) Michael Vergers	Audi R8 LMS Evo	167
6	GT3-Pro	77	(United Kingdom) Barwell Motorsport	(Switzerland) Adrian Amstutz (Finland) Patrick Kujala (United Kingdom) Jordan Witt (Denmark) Dennis Lind (United Kingdom) Adam Balon	Lamborghini Huracan GT3 Evo	166
7	GT3-Pro	10	(Germany) SPS automotive performance	(Germany) Valentin Pierburg (United Kingdom) Tom Onslow-Cole (Austria) Dominic Baumann (Germany) Lance David Arnold	Mercedes-AMG GT3	166
8	GT3-AM	19	(Netherlands) MP Motorsport	(Netherlands) Daniël de Jong (Netherlands) Henk de Jong (Netherlands) Bert de Heus (Netherlands) Jaap van Lagen	Mercedes-AMG GT3	165
9	GT3-Pro	99	(Germany) Attempto Racing	(Netherlands) Duncan Huisman (Austria) Nicolas Schöll (Netherlands) Luc Braams (Italy) Mattia Drudi	Audi R8 LMS Evo	165
10	GT3-AM	70	(Germany) Toksport WRT	(Austria) Martin Konrad (Zimbabwe) Axcil Jefferies (Austria) Alexander Hrachowina (United States) George Kurtz (United Kingdom) Finlay Hutchinson	Mercedes-AMG GT3	163
11	GT3-AM	28	(Italy) DINAMIC MOTORSPORT	(Denmark) Mikkel O. Pedersen (Italy) Roberto Pampanini (Switzerland) Ivan Jacoma (Switzerland) Mauro Calamia (Switzerland) Stefano Monaco	PORSCHE 911 GT3 R (991 II)	162
12	GT3-AM	34	(Germany) Car Collection Motorsport	(Germany) Johannes Kirchhoff (Germany) Gustav Edelhoff (Germany) Elmar Grimm (Germany) Ingo Vogler	Audi R8 LMS Evo	162
13	GT3-AM	69	Team Hong Kong Craft-Bamboo Racing	(Hong Kong) Jonathan Hui (Hong Kong) Antares Au (Hong Kong) Frank Yu (Macau) Kevin Tse	Mercedes-AMG GT3	162
14	GT3-AM	95	(New Zealand) Earl Bamber Motorsport	(Luxembourg) Eric Lux (Spain) Gérard López (Germany) Tim Müller (Germany) Jürgen Häring (New Zealand) Will Bamber	Porsche 911 GT3 R (991 II)	160
15	GT3-AM	85	(United States) CP Racing	(United States) Charles Putman (United States) Charles Espenlaub (United States) Shane Lewis (United States) Mike Hedlund	Mercedes-AMG GT3	160
16	GT3-Pro	84	(Germany) HTP Winward Motorsport	(Oman) Al Faisal Al Zubair (Germany) Maximilian Götz (Germany) Maximilian Buhk (Germany) Christopher Bruck (Netherlands) Indy Dontje	Mercedes-AMG GT3	160
17	GTX	788	(United Arab Emirates) Dragon Racing	(United Kingdom) Jim Geddie (United Kingdom) Glynn Geddie (United Kingdom) Adam Balon (United Kingdom) Phil Keen	Lamborghini Huracan Super Trofeo	160
18	991	989	(Germany) MRS GT-Racing	(Poland) Gosia Rdest (Finland) Jukka Honkavuori (United Kingdom) John Hartshorne (United Kingdom) Ollie Hancock	Porsche 991-II Cup	160
19	GT3-Pro	777	(Germany) Toksport WRT	(Germany) Luca Stolz (Germany) Maro Engel (Austria) Martin Konrad (United Kingdom) Philip Ellis (Germany) Patrick Assenheimer	Mercedes-AMG GT3	159
20	991	996	(Germany) race:pro motorsport	(Germany) Bertram Hornung (Germany) Matthias Jeserich (Germany) Christian Voigtländer (Netherlands) Larry Ten Voorde (Netherlands) Max Weering	Porsche 991 -II Cup	159
21	911	909	(Luxembourg) DUWO Racing	(Russia) Andrey Mukovoz (Russia) Sergey Peregudov (Russia) Stanislav Sidoruk (Luxembourg) Dylan Pereira	Porsche 991 -II Cup	158
22	911	969	(Germany) HRT Performance	(Sweden) Hans Holmlund (Sweden) Tommy Gråberg (Sweden) Erik Behrens (Germany) Holger Harmsen (Germany) Leon Köhler	Porsche 991 -II Cup	157
23	911	997	(Germany) race:pro motorsport	(Luxembourg) Gabriele Rindone (Germany) Matthias Hoffsümmer (United Kingdom) Oliver Webb (United Arab Emirates) Nadir Zuhour (Germany) Mark Wallenwein	Porsche 991 -II Cup	157
24	911	980	(Germany) MRS GT-Racing	(Germany) Alex Autumn (Germany) Andreas Gülden (Germany) Wolfgang Triller (Hong Kong) Shaun Thong (Croatia) Franjo Kovac	Porsche 991 -II Cup	156
25	911	911	(France) Porsche Lorient Racing	(France) Jean-François Demorge (France) Lionel Amrouche (United States) Dominique Bastien (France) Eric Mouez (France) Frédéric Ancel	Porsche 991 -II Cup	155
26	TCR	188	(Belgium) AC Motorsport	(France) Stephane Perrin (Belgium) Vincent Radermecker (Belgium) Tom Boonen (Belgium) Gilles Magnus (Canada) Matthew Taskinen	Audi RS3 LMS DSG	155
27	991	904	(New Zealand) JFC/LB Living racing	(Australia) Daniel Sutterd (Australia) Richard Muscat (New Zealand) Sam Fillmore (New Zealand) Andrew Fawcet	Porsche 991 -II Cup	154
28	GTX	754	(Belgium) QSR Racing	(Belgium) Jimmy de Breuker (Belgium) Michiel Verhaeren (Belgium) Olivier Bertels (Belgium) Johnny de Breuker (Russia) Dmitry Gvazava	Mercedes-AMG GTX	153
29	TCR	111	(Sweden) Lestrup Racing Team	(Sweden) Marcus Fluch (Sweden) Hannes Morin (Sweden) Martin Öhlin (Sweden) Oliver Söderström	Volkswagen Golf GTI TCR DSG	153
30	GT4	403	(South Korea) Atlas BX Motorsports	(Canada) Steven Cho (South Korea) Jong-Kyum Kim (Japan) Masataka Yanagida (South Korea) Jae-Sung Park	Mercedes-AMG GT4	153
31	TCR	112	(Switzerland) Autorama Motorsport by Wolf-Power Racing	(Italy) Alberto Vescovi (Italy) Roberto Ferri (Switzerland) Miklas Born (Austria) Constantin Kletzer (Switzerland) Yannick Mettler	Volkswagen Golf GTi TCR DSG	153
32	GT4	430	(United Kingdom) Century Motorsport	(United Kingdom) Nathan Freke (United States) Daren Jorgensen (United States) Brett Strom (Canada) Ben Hurst (United Kingdom) Angus Fender	BMW M4 GT4	153
33	GT4	429	(United Kingdom) Century Motorsport	(United Kingdom) Nathan Freke (United Kingdom) Andrew Gordon-Colebrooke (United States) Daren Jorgensen (Canada) Ben Hurst (United Kingdom) Angus Fender	BMW M4 GT4	153
34	GT4	451	(Germany) Team Avia Sorg Rennsport	(Germany) Björn Simon (Germany) Stephan Epp (Netherlands) Paul Seiljes (Spain) Jose Manuel de los Milagros (United Arab Emirates) Ahmed Al Melaihi	BMW M4 GT4	152
35	TCR	101	(Netherlands) Red Camel-Jordans.nl	(Netherlands) Ivo Breukers (Germany) Henry Littig (Canada) Jerimy Daniel (France) Jean-François Hevey	SEAT Cupra TCR DSG	152
36	GT4	410	(Germany) Leipert Motorsport	(Germany) Fidel Lieb (Germany) Ronny Lethmate (Germany) Kenneth Heyer (Malaysia) Melvin Moh	Mercedes-AMG GT4	151
37	GT4	462	(United Kingdom) Ciceley Motorsport	(United Kingdom) Jack Butel (United Kingdom) Jon Minshaw (Slovakia) Katarina Kyvalova (United Kingdom) Jake Giddings (United Kingdom) Adam Morgan	Mercedes-AMG GT4	151
38	GT4	438	(Canada) ST Racing	(Canada) Samantha Tan (United States) John Boyd (Canada) Nickolas Wittmer (United States) Jon Miller	BMW M4 GT4	151
39	TCR	107	(Thailand) BBR	(Thailand) Kantadhee Kusiri (Thailand) Kantasak Kusiri (Thailand) Anusorn Asiralertsiri (Thailand) Munkong Sathienthirakul (Thailand) Chariya Nuya	SEAT Cupra TCR DSG	151
40	TCR	131	(Switzerland) TOPCAR Sport with Bas Koeten Racing	(Finland) Kari-Pekka Laaksonen (Finland) Antti Buri (Switzerland) Fabian Danz (Switzerland) Ronny Jost	SEAT Cupra TCR DSG	151
41	GT4	402	(Germany) Heide-Motorsport	(Switzerland) Rahel Frey (Germany) Heinz Schmersal (United States) Alex Welch (Germany) Mike Beckhusen	Audi R8 LMS Evo	150
42	GT4	469	(Switzerland) Hofor Racing by Bonk Motorsport	(Germany) Michael Schrey (Austria) Michael Fischer (Germany) Marc Ehret (Italy) Gabriele Piana (Germany) Tobias Muller	BMW M4 GT4	150
43	TCR	1	(Switzerland) Autorama Motorsport by Wolf-Power Racing	(Switzerland) Yannick Mettler (Denmark) Kim Holmgaard (Denmark) Martin Vedel (Italy) Felice Jelmini (Belgium) Mathieu Detry	Volkswagen Golf GTI TCR DSG	150
44	TCR	110	(Sweden) Lestrup Racing Team	(Sweden) Mats Olsson (Sweden) Stefan Nilsson (Sweden) Peter Fahlström (Sweden) Christian Axelsson	Volkswagen Golf GTI TCR DSG	149
45	TCR	169	(Germany) Bonk Motorsport	(Germany) Hermann Bock (Germany) Andreas Möntmann (Germany) Michael Bonk (Germany) Michael Mayer	Audi RS3 LMS DSG	149
46	TCR	122	(Hong Kong) KCMG	(Hong Kong) Paul Ip (Hong Kong) Jim Ka To (Hong Kong) Andy Yan (Hong Kong) Kenneth Ma (Hong Kong) Henry Lee Junior	Honda Civic FK7 TCR	148
47	GT4	431	(Switzerland) Hofor Racing by Bonk Motorsport	(Switzerland) Martin Kroll (Switzerland) Michael Kroll (Switzerland) Alexander Prinz (Germany) Hermann Bock (Germany) Max Partl	BMW M4 GT4	148
48	GTX	758	(Belgium) VDS Racing Adventures	(Belgium) Raphaël van der Straten (Luxembourg) Hary Putz (Belgium) Nick Geelen (Belgium) Patrick Asnong (Australia) Jake Camilleri	MARC II V8	147
49	GTX	717	(Netherlands) Cor Euser Racing	(Netherlands) Cor Euser (Norway) Einar Thorsen (Netherlands) Richard Verburg (Hong Kong) Nigel Farmer (Malaysia) Keong Liam Lim	MARC II V8	147
50	TCX	321	(United States) Team ACP - Tangerine Associates	(United States) Damon Danieli (United States) Ken Goldberg (United States) Catesby Jones (United States) Jim Norman	BMW M240i Racing Cup	145
51	TCR	133	(Hungary) Zengő Motorsport	(Hungary) Zoltán Zengő (Hungary) Csaba Tóth (Hungary) Tamás Horváth (Hungary) Gábor Kismarty-Lechner (Hungary) Ga'l Szabolcs	SEAT Cupra TCR DSG	144
DNF	TCX	278	(United Kingdom) CWS Engineering	(United Kingdom) Colin White (South Africa) Bradley Scorer (United Kingdom) Fraser Robertson (United States) Jean-François Brunot (United Kingdom) Adam Hatfield	Ginetta G55	143
53	TCR	116	(United Arab Emirates) Atech Racing	(Australia) Peter England (United Kingdom) Will Morrison (United Kingdom) Colin Boyle (United Kingdom) Julian Griffin	SEAT LCR TCR V3 DSG	143
DNF	GTX	710	(Germany) Leipert Motorsport	(United States) Gregg Gorski (United States) Gerhard Watzinger (United Kingdom) J.M. Littman (Luxembourg) Yury Wagner (France) Tom Dillmann	Lamborghini Huracan Super Trofeo	140
55	991	902	(Germany) TM - Racing.org	(Germany) Harald Geisselhart (Germany) Andreas Riedl (Germany) Der Bommel (Austria) Constantin Schöll	Porsche 991-II Cup	138
56	TC	351	(Germany) Team Avia Sorg Rennsport	(United States) Skip Woody (Denmark) Johan Schwartz (Mexico) Benito Tagle (United States) Mark Brummond	BMW M240i Racing Cup	138
57	GT4	468	(France) 3Y Technology	(France) Gilles Vannelet (Switzerland) Nidal Baumgartner (Czech Republic) Petr Lisa (Netherlands) Beitske Visser	BMW M4 GT4	137
58	TCR	175	(Netherlands) NKPP Racing by Bas Koeten Racing	(Netherlands) Gijs Bessem (Netherlands) Harry Hilders (Netherlands) Bob Herber (Netherlands) Willem Meijer	SEAT Cupra TCR DSG	137
59	GT3-AM	29	(Italy) DINAMIC MOTORSPORT	(Austria) Philipp Sager (Austria) Helmut Roedig (United Arab Emirates) Bashar Mardini (Austria) Christopher Zöchling	Porsche 911 GT3 R (991 II)	134
60	TCX	226	(France) Nordschleife Racing	(France) Guillaume Roman (France) Thierry Blaise (France) François Riaux (Canada) Michel Sallenbach	Ligier JS2 R	124
61	GTX	705	(Italy) Lotus PB Racing	(Italy) Stefano D'Aste (Italy) Luciano Tarabini (Monaco) Vito Utzieri (Italy) Enrico Ricciardi	Lotus Exige V6 Cup R	110
DNF	GT3-AM	26	(France) SAINTELOC RACING	(Belgium) Pierre-Yves Paque (Luxembourg) Christian Kelders (France) Daniel Desbrueres (France) Michael Blanchemain (France) Steven Palette	Audi R8 LMS Evo	102
DNF	TC	302	(Germany) fun-M Motorsport	(United States) Vincent Piemonte (United States) Oscar Jackson (Belgium) Recep Sari (Switzerland) Gustavo Xavier (Germany) Eric Zimmermann	BMW M240i Racing Cup	48
DNC	GTX	201	(France) Vortex V8	(France) Julien Boillot (France) Philippe Bonnel (France) Arnaud Gomez (France) Olivier Gomez	Vortex Light V8	33
DNF	GT3-Pro	24	(United Arab Emirates) GPX Racing	(France) Julien Andlauer (United Kingdom) Stuart Hall (South Africa) Jordan Grogor (United Arab Emirates) Frédéric Fatien (Germany) Dirk Werner	Porsche 911 GT3 R (991 II)	3
DNS	991	979	(Belgium) Speed Lover	(Netherlands) Kevin Veltman (Netherlands) Marcel Schoonhoven (Netherlands) Remon Vos	Porsche 991-II Cup	0
DNS	GT4	471	(United Kingdom) Newbridge Motorsport	(Belgium) Nico Verdonck (Belgium) Rodrigue Gillion (United Kingdom) Riley Coomber (South Africa) Paul Hill (South Africa) Michael Stephen	Aston Martin Vantage AMR GT4	0
DNS	TC	172	(France) Nordschleife Racing	(France) Thierry Boyer (France) Philippe Baffoun (France) Thierry Chkondali (United Kingdom) Rhys Lloyd (France) Bruno Derossi	Peugeot 308 Racing Cup	0

24H Series
Previous race: none	2020 season	Next race: 24 Hours of Portimão
