= Karen Gaillard =

Swiss racing driver (born 2001)

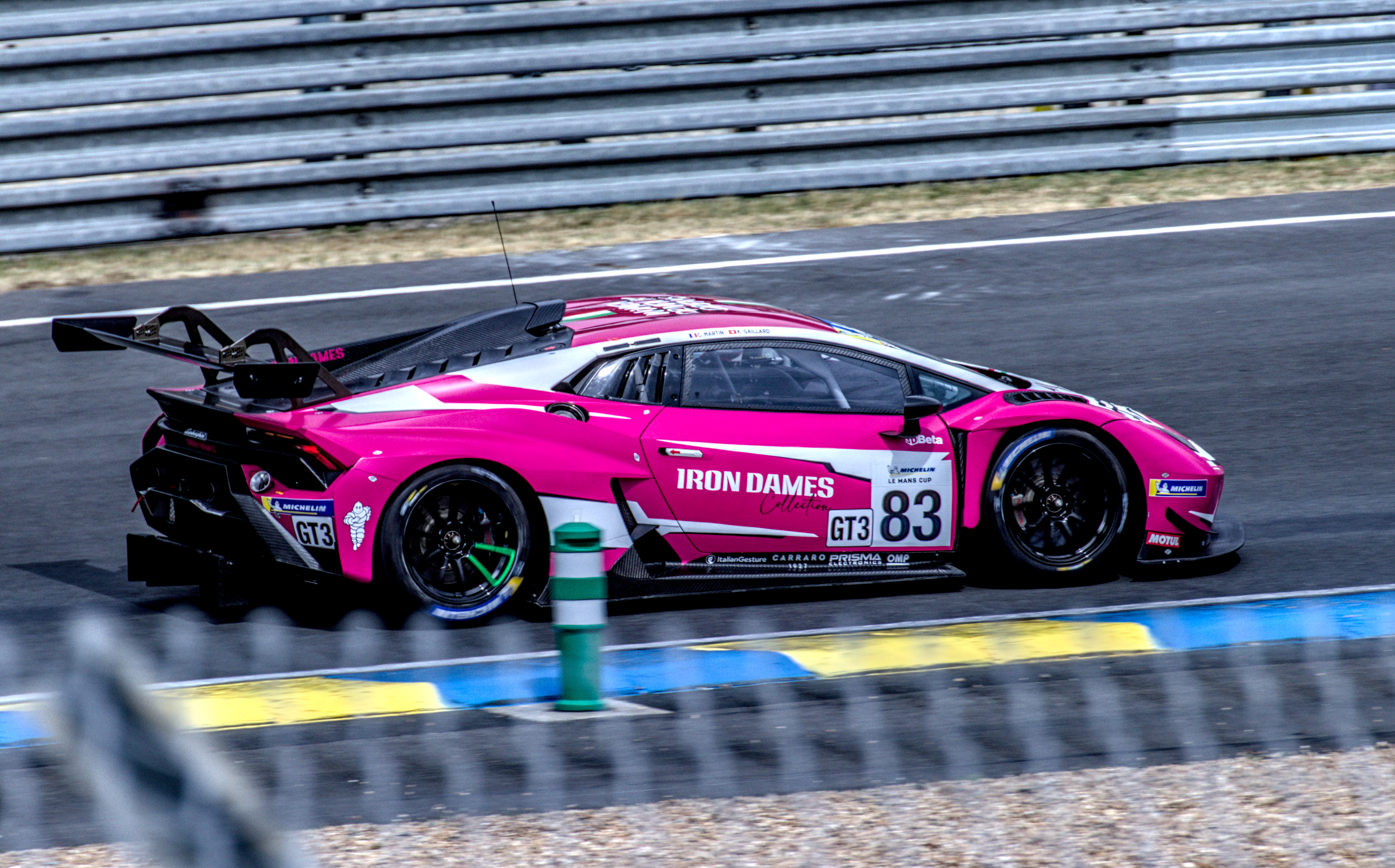
- Gaillard in 2024
- Nationality: (Switzerland) Swiss
- Born: 29 June 2001 (age 25) Fribourg, Switzerland
- Categorisation: FIA Silver

Karen Gaillard (born 29 June 2001 in Fribourg) is a Swiss racing driver who last competed for Ombra Racing in Porsche Carrera Cup Italy.

== Career ==
=== Beginnings (2019–2023) ===
After being a finalist in the AutoScout24 and CUPRA Young Driver Challenge 2019, Gaillard made her touring car racing debut in the 2019 ADAC TCR Germany Touring Car Championship, racing at the Nürburgring round as a guest driver. In her maiden TCR outing, Gaillard scored her first top-ten finish in race two by finishing ninth. At the end of the year, Gaillard won the AutoScout24 and CUPRA scouting programs, earning her a drive in the 2020 24H TCE Series. In the pandemic-affected season, Gaillard made her debut in the third round of the season at Monza Circuit, and scored a class podium in the following round at Hockenheim.

Returning to the 24H Series for 2021, Gaillard switched to the GTX class alongside Lionel Amrouche, her first incursion into sportscar racing. In the three races contested by Gaillard, she scored her first podiums in GTX with a runner-up finish at Dubai and a third at Mugello. In 2022, Gaillard switched to the Mitjet Series, joining Racing Spirit of Léman for her first full-time season in motorsports. She scored a best result of sixth at Barcelona and finished 18th in the standings.

In 2023, Gaillard competed in the NP02 class of the European Endurance Prototype Cup, joining DIMAB Motorsport by ANS alongside Grégory de Sybourg. Despite not taking a win throughout the season, Gaillard scored three pole positions and four podiums to finish runner-up in her maiden season in the championship.

=== Iron Dames (2024–present) ===
2024 was a landmark season for Gaillard, as she joined the Iron Dames for her GT3 debut in the Le Mans Cup, sharing a Lamborghini Huracán GT3 Evo 2 alongside Célia Martin. Racing on an equal footing against several Gold-rated drivers, Gaillard showcased pace, scored regular points and achieved a maiden podium at Paul Ricard, on her way to sixth in the standings. Alongside her Le Mans Cup campaign, Gaillard returned to the NP02 class of the European Endurance Prototype Cup, scoring a best finish of fourth at the season-ending Paul Ricard round.

In late 2024, Gaillard won the Porsche Carrera Cup France shootout, becoming the first woman to win the selection and earning her a drive in the 2025 Porsche Carrera Cup France season with Schumacher CLRT. In preparation for her rookie season, Gaillard competed in select rounds of the Porsche Sprint Challenge Southern Europe. In her maiden season in Carrera Cup France, Gaillard scored points in all but one race and took a best result of seventh in race two at Valencia to end the year 17th in points.

During 2025, Gaillard also made her debut with the main Iron Dames quartet in the IMSA SportsCar Championship, racing a 992-spec Porsche 911 GT3 R in that year's 24 Hours of Daytona. Despite falling three laps down due to a long pit stop under green, Gaillard played a role in the team's charge to an eighth place finish in GTD. In July that year, she drove a custom-designed Porsche 911 GT3 RS by singer Dua Lipa during the Goodwood Festival of Speed.

The following year, Gaillard joined Ombra Racing to race in the Porsche Carrera Cup Italy. In her first season in the series, Gaillard scored a best result of 14th at Monza and ended the year 29th in the overall standings.

== Racing record ==
=== Racing career summary ===
Season	Series	Team	Races	Wins	Poles	F/Laps	Podiums	Points	Position
2019	ADAC TCR Germany Touring Car Championship	Young Driver Challenge	2	0	0	0	0	0	NC
2020	24H TCE Series – TCR	TOPCAR sport by Bas Koeten Racing	2	0	0	0	1	28	14th
2020	Campeonato de España de Resistencia - GT	Vortex V8	2	0	0	0	0	26	18th
2021	24H GT Series – GTX	Vortex V8	3	0	0	0	2	56	5th
2022	Trophée MitJet 2L France	Racing Spirit of Léman	20	0	0	0	0	86.5	18th
2022	Trophee Mitjet 2L Benelux Central		8	0	0	0	0	??	??
2023	European Endurance Prototype Cup – NP02	DIMAB Motorsport by ANS	6	0	3	0	4	99	**2nd**
2024	Le Mans Cup – GT3	Iron Dames	7	0	0	0	1	43	6th
2024	European Endurance Prototype Cup – NP02	ANS Motorsport	6	0	0	0	0	45.5	11th
2025	IMSA SportsCar Championship – GTD	Iron Dames	1	0	0	0	0	251	69th
2025	Porsche Sprint Challenge Southern Europe	Schumacher CLRT	4	0	0	0	0	2	32nd
2025	Porsche Carrera Cup France	Schumacher CLRT	12	0	0	0	0	37	17th
2025	Porsche Sports Cup Suisse – GT3 Cup	Proton Huber Competition	2	0	1	0	0	?	?
2026	Porsche Carrera Cup Italy	Ombra Racing	11	0	0	0	0	3	29th

=== Complete Ultimate Cup Series results ===
(key) (Races in bold indicate pole position; results in italics indicate fastest lap)

Year	Entrant	Class	Chassis	1	2	3	4	5	6	Rank	Points
2023	DIMAB Motorsport by ANS	NP02	Nova Proto NP02	**LEC1**; 7	**NAV**; 13	HOC; 6	**EST**; 4	MAG; 7	LEC2; 5	2nd	99
2024	ANS Motorsport	NP02	Nova Proto NP02	LEC1; 8	ALG; 15	HOC; 6	MUG; 7	MAG; 24†	LEC2; 5	11th	45.5

^{*} Season still in progress.

=== Complete Le Mans Cup results ===
(key) (Races in bold indicate pole position; results in italics indicate fastest lap)

Year	Entrant	Class	Car	1	2	3	4	5	6	7	Rank	Points
2024	Iron Dames	GT3	Lamborghini Huracán GT3 Evo 2	BAR; 7	**LEC**; 2	LMS; 1; 7	LMS; 2; 16	SPA; 11	MUG; 5	ALG; 7	6th	43

=== Complete IMSA SportsCar Championship results ===
(key) (Races in bold indicate pole position; races in italics indicate fastest lap)

Year	Entrant	Class	Make	Engine	1	2	3	4	5	6	7	8	9	10	Rank	Points
2025	Iron Dames	GTD	Porsche 911 GT3 R (992)	Porsche M97/80 4.2 L Flat-6	DAY; 8	SEB	LBH	LGA	WGL	MOS	ELK	VIR	IMS	PET	69th	251

=== Complete 24 Hours of Daytona results ===
Year	Team	Co-Drivers	Car	Class	Laps	Ovr. Pos.	Cla. Pos.
2025	(Italy) Iron Dames	(Belgium) Sarah Bovy (Switzerland) Rahel Frey (Denmark) Michelle Gatting	Porsche 911 GT3 R (992)	GTD	719	33rd	8th

=== Complete Porsche Carrera Cup France results ===
(key) (Races in bold indicate pole position) (Races in italics indicate fastest lap)

Year	Team	1	2	3	4	5	6	7	8	9	10	11	12	Pos	Points
2025	Schumacher CLRT	CAT; 1; 14	CAT; 2; 17	DIJ; 1; 12	DIJ; 2; 13	SPA; 1; 12	SPA; 2; 14	MIS; 1; 15	MIS; 2; 12	VAL; 1; 14	VAL; 2; 7	LEC; 1; 16	LEC; 2; 12	17th	37

=== Complete Porsche Carrera Cup Italy results ===
(key) (Races in bold indicate pole position; races in italics indicate fastest lap)

Year	Team	1	2	3	4	5	6	7	8	9	10	11	12	Pos.	Points
2026	Ombra Racing	IMO; 1 Ret	IMO; 2 DNS	MIS1; 1; 20	MIS1; 2; 21	MNZ; 1; 14	MNZ; 2; 19	VAL; 1; 17	VAL; 2; 15	MIS2; 1; 25	MIS2; 2; 16	MUG; 1; 22	MUG; 2; 20	29th	3
