= Ligier JS2 R =

French racing car

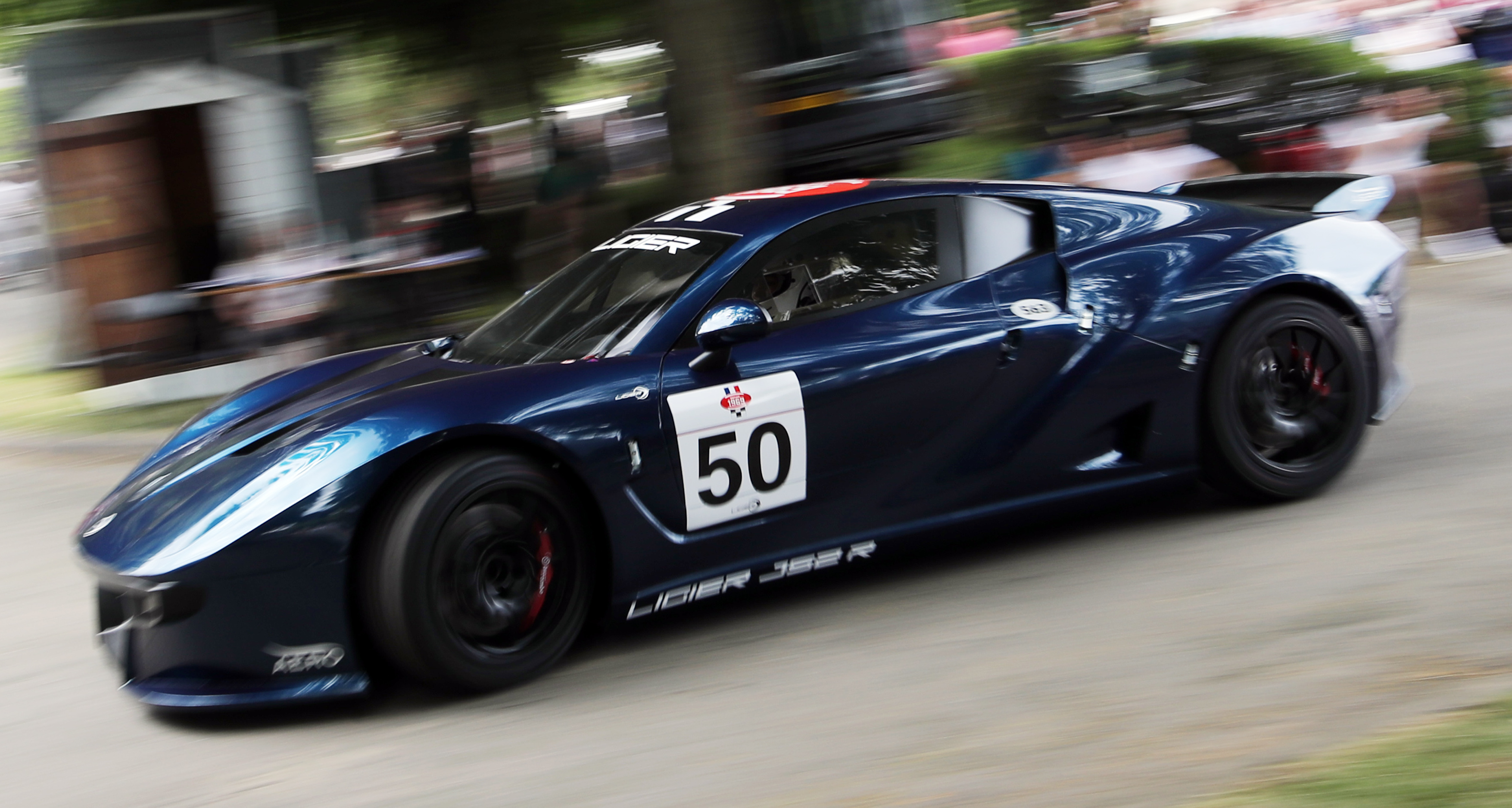
- A JS2 R at the 2019 Goodwood Festival of Speed

Overview
- Manufacturer: Ligier
- Production: 2018 –
- Assembly: Abrest, France

Body and chassis
- Class: Racing car
- Body style: 2-door coupé
- Layout: rear mid-engine, rear-wheel-drive

Powertrain
- Engine: 3.7 L Ford Duratec 37 V6
- Transmission: 6-speed sequential manual

Dimensions
- Wheelbase: 2,680 mm (105.5 in)
- Length: 4,415 mm (173.8 in)
- Width: 1,900 mm (74.8 in)
- Height: 1,180 mm (46.5 in)
- Kerb weight: 1,055 kg (2,326 lb)

The Ligier JS2 R is a GT racing car manufactured by French automaker Ligier. Designed solely for track use, the car is an homage to the original Ligier JS2 introduced in 1972.

== Model information ==
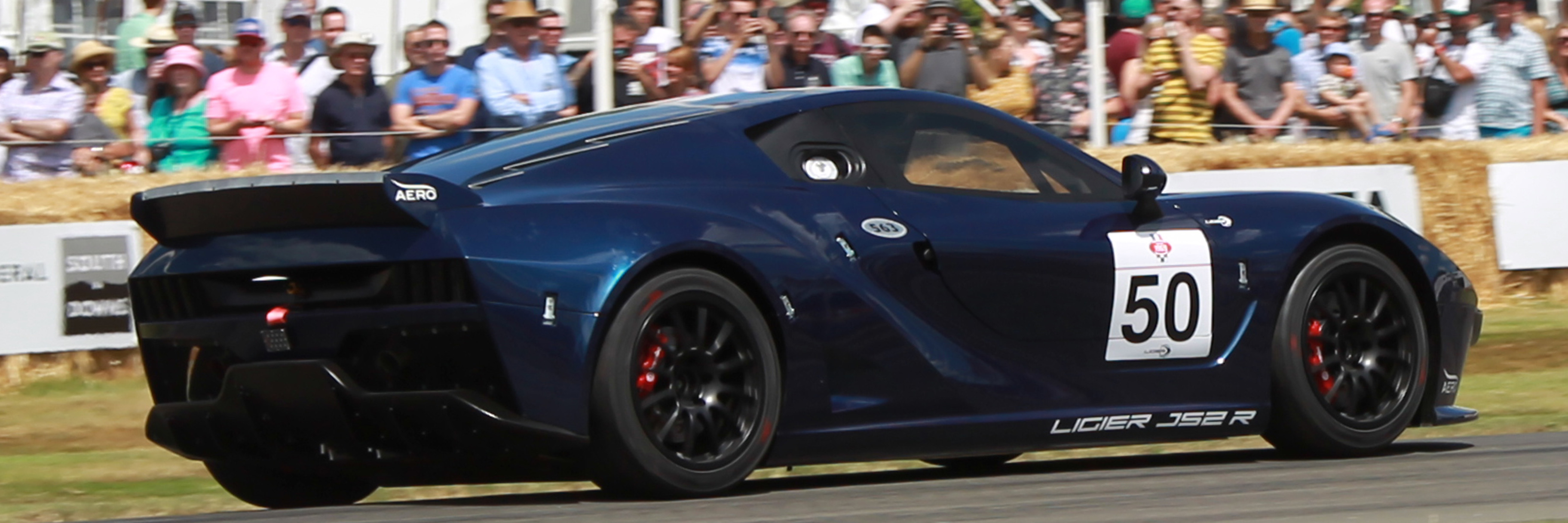
Rear view

The JS2 R debuted at the Paris Motor Show in 2018, the Ligier company's 50th anniversary year. It was inspired by the Ligier JS2 introduced in 1972, a car described as having superior driving dynamics and the best power-to-weight ratio of the time. The original JS2 finished second in its class at the 1975 24 Hours of Le Mans. The JS2 R borrows many design cues from the JS2. The "R" in the car's name is said to stand for either "Revival", or "Race". While it is designed to be an easy car to drive, no road-legal variant of the JS2 R is planned.

== Features ==
The car is powered by the same 3.7 L Ford Duratec 37 V6 engine used in the JS P4, coupled to a 6-speed sequential manual transmission with pneumatic shift mechanism and paddle shifters. Early engines generated a maximum power output of 335 PS (246 kW; 330 hp), but in 2020 power rose to 355 PS (261 kW; 350 hp). The braking system is from Brembo, with 6-piston calipers and 343 mm (13.5 in) rotors in front, and 4-piston calipers over 304 mm (12.0 in) rotors in back. The suspension is a double wishbone system with actuated push-rods at the rear, with adjustable anti-roll bars and dampers. The interior is driver focused, and designed to accommodate tall drivers. A heated windscreen is standard equipment.

The JS2 R is designed to deliver low running costs and ease of maintenance. The car can be homologated for FIA Group E category. Test days were scheduled for November 2018 for prospective buyers.

== Motorsports ==
Since 2020 the car competes in its own category in the "Ligier European Series" of racing.

== Technical data ==
	Ligier JS2 R
Engine:	3.7 L Ford Cyclone V6
Bore × Stroke:	95.5 mm × 86.7 mm (3.76 in × 3.41 in)
Displacement:	3,726 cc (227.4 cu in)
Maximum power:	355 PS (261 kW; 350 hp) at 7000 rpm
Valvetrain:	DOHC, 4 valves per cylinder
Induction:	Naturally aspirated, Multi-point fuel injection
Cooling:	Water-cooled
Transmission:	3MO transverse 6-speed sequential gearbox
Clutch:	ZF centrifugal twin disc
Steering:	Electric power steering
Brakes f/r:	Brembo braking system. 6-piston calipers with 343 mm (13.5 in) rotors front 4-piston calipers with 328 mm (12.9 in) rotors rear
Suspension front:	Upper and lower wishbones, adjustable anti-roll bar, adjustable dampers
Suspension rear:	Upper and lower wishbones, rear actuated pushrods, adjustable anti-roll bar, adjustable dampers
Body/Chassis:	FIA homologated tubular steel chassis with fibreglass body
Layout:	Mid/rear
Wheelbase:	2,680 mm (105.5 in)
Wheels:	18 in (457 mm) aluminium alloy wheels
Length; Width; Height:	4,415 mm (173.8 in); 1,900 mm (74.8 in); 1,180 mm (46.5 in)
Fuel tank:	100 L (26.4 US gal; 22.0 imp gal) FIA homologated
Weight:	1,055 kg (2,326 lb)
Maximum speed:	274 km/h (170 mph) (est.)

== Ligier JS2 RH2 ==
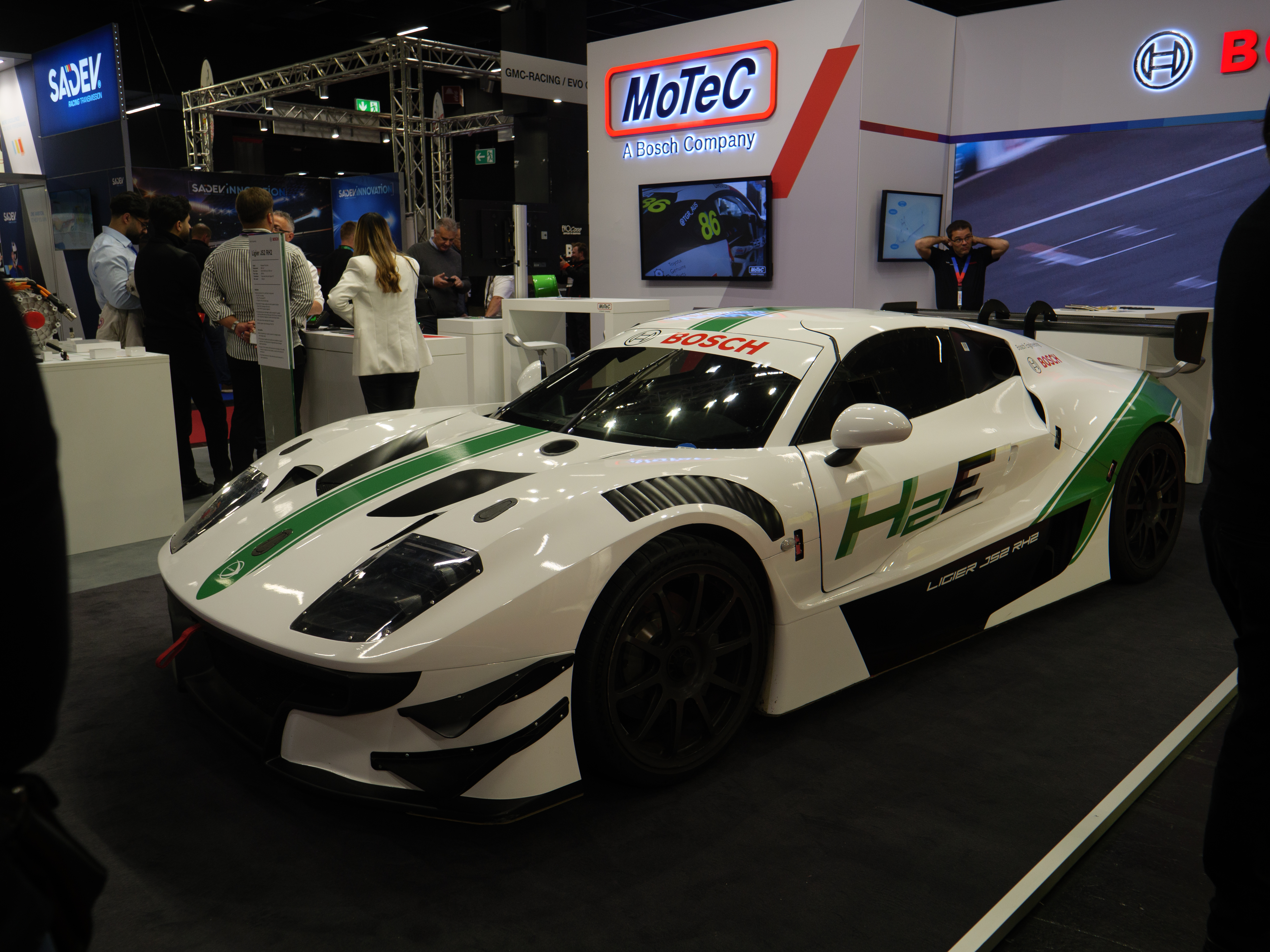
JS2 RH2 at the Professional MotorSport World Expo in 2024

The JS2 R provided the basis for development of a demonstration hydrogen powered vehicle to be unveiled at the 24 Hours of Le Mans in early June 2023. The car, called the JS2 RH2, is a joint project of Bosch, who has oversight of the overall vehicle concept including engine, hydrogen storage, and development of a safety concept, and Ligier, who is responsible for vehicle architecture, H2 system integration and cooling.

== Ligier JS2 RS ==
In 2025, Ligier introduced the Ligier JS2 RS, an evolution of the JS2 R designed for endurance racing and extreme track work. It features a 3.5-litre Ford V6 Ecoboost engine that delivers up to 650 horse power, paired alongside a SADEV SL 90-20 EVO gearbox. It also received an aerodynamic upgrade compared to the JS2 R, with a carbon splitter, underfloor, and rear diffuser. This car was later also homologated for SRO GT2.
