= Bas Koeten Racing =

Auto Racing team of Dutch origin

(Netherlands) Bas Koeten Racing
- Founded: 2003
- Team principal(s): Bas Koeten
- Current series: Supercar Challenge; Porsche Carrera Cup Benelux
- Former series: Acceleration 2014; TCR International Series
- Noted drivers: Porsche Carrera Cup Benelux; 55. (Germany) Colin Bönighausen
- Website: http://www.baskoetenracing.nl/

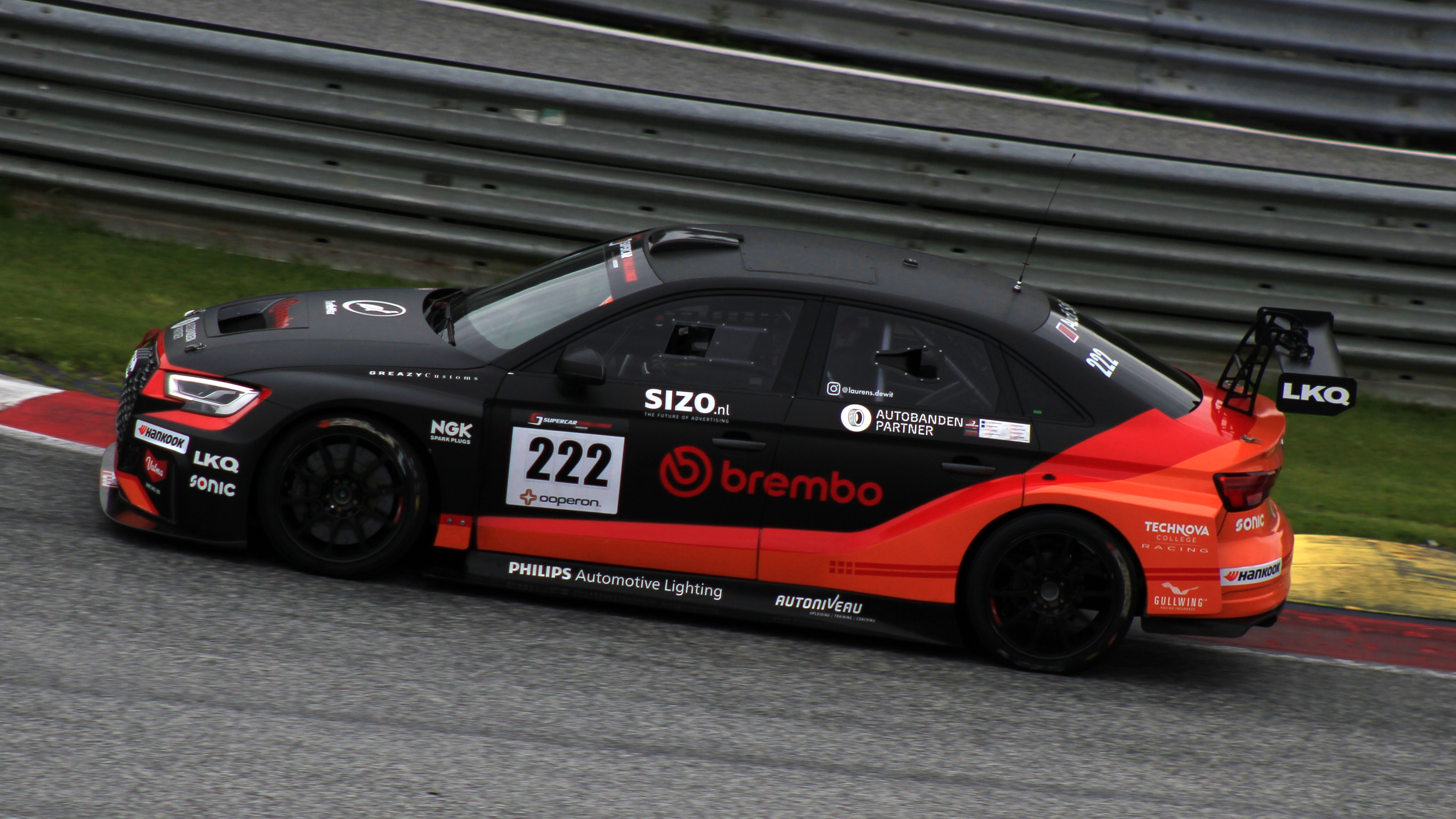
Audi RS 3 LMS TCR of Bas Koeten Racing

Bas Koeten Racing is a Dutch auto racing team based in Westwoud, Netherlands. The team currently races in the Supercar Challenge and the Porsche Carrera Cup Benelux. Having previously raced in the Acceleration 2014 & TCR International Series amongst others.

== TCR International Series ==
=== SEAT León Cup Racer (2015–) ===
After having raced in the Acceleration 2014 in 2014, the team will enter the 2015 TCR International Series season with Bas Schouten driving an SEAT León Cup Racer.
