= 2021 12 Hours of Mugello =

The layout of the Mugello Circuit.

The 2021 Hankook 12 Hours of Mugello was the 7th running of the 12 Hours of Mugello. It was also the second round of the 2021 24H GT and TCE Series. The race was won by Daniel Allemann, Ralf Bohn, Alfred Renauer and Robert Renauer in the #91 Herberth Motorsport Porsche 911 GT3 R.

== Schedule ==
Date	Time (local: CEST)	Event	Distance
Friday, 26 March	09:00 - 10:30	Practice (Both classes)	90 mins
Friday, 26 March	10:45 - 11:15	Qualifying - TCE	30 Mins
Friday, 26 March	11:30 - 12:00	Qualifying - GT	30 Mins
Friday, 26 March	14:00 - 18:00	Race (Part 1)	4 Hours
Saturday, 27 March	10:00 - 18:00	Race (Part 2)	8 Hours

== Entry list ==
42 cars were entered into the event; 29 GT cars and 13 TCEs.

Team	Car	Engine	No.	Drivers
GT3-Am (13 entries)
(Italy) Dinamic Motorsport	Porsche 911 GT3 R (2019)	Porsche 4.0 L Flat-6	7	(Switzerland) Mauro Calamia (Switzerland) Ivan Jacoma (Italy) Roberto Pampanini
(Switzerland) Kessel Racing	Ferrari 488 GT3 Evo (2020)	Ferrari 3.9 L Twin-Turbo V8	8	(Italy) Alessandro Cutrera (Italy) Leonardo-Maria del Vecchio (Italy) Marco Frezza (Italy) Marco Talarico
(Netherlands) Equipe Verschuur	Renault R.S. 01 F GT3	Nissan VR38DETT 3.0 L V6	9	(Netherlands) Harrie Kolen (Netherlands) Erik van Loon (Netherlands) Mike Verschuur
(Czech Republic) MiddleCap racing with Scuderia Praha	Ferrari 488 GT3	Ferrari 3.9 L Twin-Turbo V8	11	(Czech Republic) Josef Král (Slovakia) Matúš Výboh (Slovakia) Miroslav Výboh
(Germany) Team Zakspeed	Mercedes-AMG GT3 Evo	Mercedes-AMG M159 6.2 L V8	13	(Russia) Evgeny Kireev (Russia) Victor Shaytar (Russia) Sergey Stolyarov
(Germany) Rutronik Racing by TECE	Audi R8 LMS Evo	Audi 5.2 L V10	18	(Austria) Michael Doppelmayr (Germany) Elia Erhart (Germany) Swen Herberger (Germany) Pierre Kaffer
(Germany) Hella Pagid - racing one	Ferrari 488 GT3	Ferrari 3.9 L Twin-Turbo V8	30	(Italy) Daniele Di Amato (Germany) Francesco Lopez (Germany) Axel Sartingen (Germany) Daniel Schwerfeld
(Germany) Car Collection Motorsport	Audi R8 LMS Evo	Audi 5.2 L V10	34	(Germany) Gustav Edelhoff (Germany) Elmar Grimm (Germany) Johannes Kirchhoff
(Italy) MP Racing	Mercedes-AMG GT3 Evo	Mercedes-AMG M159 6.2 L V8	58	(Italy) Corinna Gostner (Italy) David Gostner (Italy) Manuela Gostner (Italy) Thomas Gostner (Italy) Giorgio Sernagiotto
(Switzerland) Haegeli by T2 Racing	Porsche 911 GT3 R	Porsche 4.0 L Flat-6	66	(Germany) Marc Basseng (Switzerland) Pieder Decurtins (Germany) Manuel Lauck
(United States) CP Racing	Mercedes-AMG GT3 Evo	Mercedes-AMG M159 6.2 L V8	85	(United States) Charles Espenlaub (United States) Joe Foster (United States) Shane Lewis (United States) Charles Putman
(Germany) Herberth Motorsport	Porsche 911 GT3 R (2019)	Porsche 4.0 L Flat-6	91	(Switzerland) Daniel Allemann (Germany) Ralf Bohn (Germany) Alfred Renauer (Germany) Robert Renauer
(Germany) Herberth Motorsport	Porsche 911 GT3 R (2019)	Porsche 4.0 L Flat-6	92	(Germany) Stefan Aust (Germany) "Bobby Gonzales" (Germany) Jürgen Häring (Germany) Marco Seefried
GTX (6 entries)
(France) Vortex V8	Vortex 1.0 GTX	Chevrolet 6.2 L V8	701	(France) Lionel Amrouche (France) Philippe Bonnel (Switzerland) Karen Gaillard (France) Boris Gimond
(France) Vortex V8	Vortex 1.0 GTX	Chevrolet 6.2 L V8	712	(France) Philippe Bonnel (France) Pierre Fontaine (Switzerland) Nicolas Nobs
(Germany) Leipert Motorsport	Lamborghini Huracán Super Trofeo Evo	Lamborghini 5.2 L V10	710	(Canada) Ray Calvin (Germany) Matthias Hoffsümmer (Luxembourg) Gabriele Rindone
(Lithuania) Siauliai - RD Signs racing team	Lamborghini Huracán Super Trofeo	Lamborghini 5.2 L V10	720	(Lithuania) Audrius Butkevicius (Lithuania) Ramunas Capkauskas (Lithuania) Egidijus Gutaravicius (Lithuania) Paulius Paskevicius
(Germany) Reiter Engineering	KTM X-Bow GTX Concept	Audi 2.5 L I5	724	(Austria) Eike Angermayr (United States) Nicolai Elghanayan (Austria) Horst Felbermayr Jr. (Norway) Mads Siljehaug
(Italy) Lotus PB Racing	Lotus Exige V6 Cup R	Toyota 3.5 L V6	726	(Italy) Massimo Abbati (Italy) Stefano D'Aste (Italy) Daniel Grimaldi (Monaco) Vito Utzieri
991 (8 entries)
(Luxembourg) DUWO Racing	Porsche 991 GT3 Cup II	Porsche 4.0 L Flat-6	909	(Russia) Andrey Mukovoz (Russia) Sergey Peregudov (Russia) Stanislav Sidoruk
(Lithuania) Juta Racing	Porsche 991 GT3 Cup II	Porsche 4.0 L Flat-6	910	(Lithuania) Julius Adomavičius (Lithuania) Andrius Gelžinis (Lithuania) Jonas Gelžinis
(Switzerland) Stadler Motorsport	Porsche 991 GT3 Cup II	Porsche 4.0 L Flat-6	920	(Switzerland) Marc Arn (Switzerland) Paul Kasper (Switzerland) Jan Klingelnberg (Switzerland) Ramon Werner
(Germany) PROFILDOORS by Huber Racing	Porsche 991 GT3 Cup II	Porsche 4.0 L Flat-6	924	(Italy) Andreas Corradina (Russia) Merabi Mekvabishvili (Russia) Nikolay Gadetsky
(Romania) Willi Motorsport by Ebimotors	Porsche 991 GT3 Cup II	Porsche 4.0 L Flat-6	955	(Italy) Fabrizio Broggi (Italy) Sabino de Castro (Romania) Sergiu Nicolae
(San Marino) GDL Racing	Porsche 991 GT3 Cup II	Porsche 4.0 L Flat-6	967	(Finland) Axel Blom (Switzerland) Mario Cordoni (Argentina) Andres Bruno Josephsohn (Argentina) Andres Michel Josephsohn
(San Marino) GDL Racing	Porsche 991 GT3 Cup II	Porsche 4.0 L Flat-6	969	(Italy) Gianluca de Lorenzi (Italy) Maurizio Fratti (Italy) Giacomo Giubergia (Italy) Roberto Rayneri
(Italy) Ebimotors	Porsche 991 GT3 Cup II	Porsche 4.0 L Flat-6	973	(Italy) Massimiliano Donzelli (Italy) Gianluca Giorgi (Italy) Paolo Gnemmi (Italy) Orlando Mattia Di Giusto (Italy) Luigi Peroni
GT4 (2 entries)
(Switzerland) Centri Porsche Ticino	Porsche 718 Cayman GT4 Clubsport	Porsche 3.8 L Flat-6	412	(Netherlands) Christian de Kant (Italy) Alessandro Fogliani (Germany) Thomas Herbst (Switzerland) Valerio Presezzi (Italy) Antonio Spavone
(Canada) ST Racing	BMW M4 GT4	BMW N55 3.0 L Twin-Turbo I6	438	(United States) Chandler Hull (United States) Jon Miller (Canada) Samantha Tan
TCR (8 entries)
(Switzerland) Autorama Motorsport by Wolf-Power Racing	Volkswagen Golf GTI TCR	Volkswagen 2.0 L I4	1	(Norway) Emil Heyerdahl (Austria) Constantin Kletzer (Germany) Marcus Menden (Switzerland) Walter Reho
(Switzerland) Autorama Motorsport by Wolf-Power Racing	Volkswagen Golf GTI TCR	Volkswagen 2.0 L I4	112	(Switzerland) Jasmin Preisig (Austria) Constantin Kletzer (Italy) Roberto Ferri
(Netherlands) Red Camel-Jordans.nl	CUPRA León TCR	Volkswagen 2.0 L I4	101	(Netherlands) Ivo Breukers (Netherlands) Rik Breukers
(Spain) RC2 Junior Team by Cabra Racing	Cupra León Competición TCR	Volkswagen 2.0 L I4	108	(Spain) Felipe Fernández (Spain) Rubén Fernández (Spain) Victor Fernández
(Lithuania) Juta Racing Junior	CUPRA León TCR	Volkswagen 2.0 L I4	121	(Lithuania) Nerijus Baliunas (Lithuania) Algirdas Gelžinis (Lithuania) Ignas Gelžinis (Lithuania) Aurimas Jablonskis (Lithuania) Audrius Navickas
(Italy) Élite Motorsport	Volkswagen Golf GTI TCR	Volkswagen 2.0 L I4	147	(Italy) Pierluigi Alessandri (Italy) Simone Patrinicola (Italy) Gianvito Rossi
(Netherlands) NKPP Racing by Bas Koeten Racing	CUPRA León TCR	Volkswagen 2.0 L I4	175	(Netherlands) Gijs Bessem (Netherlands) Harry Hilders
(Belgium) AC Motorsport	Audi RS 3 LMS TCR	Volkswagen 2.0 L I4	188	(Belgium) Mathieu Detry (France) Stéphane Perrin
TCX (5 entries)
(Netherlands) JR Motorsport	BMW M3 E46 GTR	BMW 4.0 L V8	202	(Netherlands) Bas Schouten (Netherlands) Coos Schouten (Netherlands) Dirk Schouten
(Netherlands) JR Motorsport	BMW M3 F80	BMW S55B30T0 3.0 L I6	203	(Belgium) Ward Sluys (Netherlands) Sandra van der Sloot (Netherlands) Ted van Vliet
(Italy) Lotus PB Racing	Lotus Elise Cup PB-R	Toyota 1.4 L I4	205	(Italy) Denis Bonvini (Switzerland) Luca Flaccador (Switzerland) Maurizio Fortina (Italy) Alberto Grisi (Switzerland) Franco Nespoli
(Belgium) Speed Lover	Porsche 718 Cayman GT4 Clubsport	Porsche 3.8 L Flat-6	206	(Belgium) Kurt Hensen (Belgium) Philippe Wils
(United Kingdom) CWS Engineering	Ginetta G55 Supercup	Ford Cyclone 3.7 L V6	278	(United States) Jean-Francois Brunot (United Kingdom) James Kell (United Kingdom) Colin White

== Results ==
=== Qualifying ===
==== TCE ====
Fastest in class in bold.

Pos.	Class	No.	Team	Time
1	**TCX**	**203**	**(Netherlands) JR Motorsport**	**1:58.897**
2	**TCR**	**101**	**(Netherlands) Red Camel-Jordans.nl**	**1:58.901**
3	TCR	188	(Belgium) AC Motorsport	1:59.268
4	TCR	108	(Spain) RC2 Junior Team by Cabra Racing	1:59.356
5	TCX	202	(Netherlands) JR Motorsport	1:59.593
6	TCR	1	(Switzerland) Autorama Motorsport by Wolf-Power Racing	1:59.825
7	TCR	175	(Netherlands) NKPP Racing by Bas Koeten Racing	1:59.862
8	TCR	121	(Lithuania) Juta Racing Junior	2:00.169
9	TCR	147	(Italy) Élite Motorsport	2:01.005
10	TCX	206	(Belgium) Speed Lover	2:03.580
11	TCX	205	(Italy) Lotus PB Racing	2:08.006
12	TCX	278	(United Kingdom) CWS Engineering	No time
13	TCR	112	(Switzerland) Autorama Motorsport by Wolf-Power Racing	No time (Note: The No. 112 Autorama Motorsport by Wolf-Power Racing car was heavily damaged in an unofficial test session on 24 March and could not be repaired in time.)

==== GT ====
Fastest in class in bold.

Pos.	Class	No.	Team	Time
1	**GT3-Am**	**9**	**(Netherlands) Equipe Verschuur**	**1:46.551**
2	GT3-Am	18	(Germany) Rutronik Racing by TECE	1:46.680
3	GT3-Am	92	(Germany) Herberth Motorsport	1:46.865
4	GT3-Am	11	(Czech Republic) MiddleCap racing with Scuderia Praha	1:47.342
5	GT3-Am	30	(Germany) Hella Pagid - racing one	1:47.378
6	GT3-Am	91	(Germany) Herberth Motorsport	1:47.533
7	GT3-Am	66	(Switzerland) Haegeli by T2 Racing	1:47.655
8	GT3-Am	8	(Switzerland) Kessel Racing	1:47.711
9	GT3-Am	7	(Italy) Dinamic Motorsport	1:47.740
10	GT3-Am	85	(United States) CP Racing	1:48.523
11	GT3-Am	58	(Italy) MP Racing	1:48.659
12	GT3-Am	34	(Germany) Car Collection Motorsport	1:51.121
13	**GTX**	**710**	**(Germany) Leipert Motorsport**	**1:51.417**
14	**991**	**969**	**(San Marino) GDL Racing**	**1:53.242**
15	GTX	724	(Germany) Reiter Engineering	1:53.275
16	991	955	(Romania) Willi Motorsport by Ebimotors	1:53.533
17	GTX	720	(Lithuania) Siauliai - RD Signs racing team	1:53.848
18	991	967	(San Marino) GDL Racing	1:53.866
19	991	924	(Germany) PROFILDOORS by Huber Racing	1:55.001
20	991	910	(Lithuania) Juta Racing	1:55.002
21	991	909	(Luxembourg) DUWO Racing	1:55.645
22	991	973	(Italy) Ebimotors	1:56.812
23	991	920	(Switzerland) Stadler Motorsport	1:57.119
24	GTX	712	(France) Vortex V8	1:57.751
25	GTX	726	(Italy) Lotus PB Racing	1:58.203
26	**GT4**	**438**	**(Canada) ST Racing**	**1:59.361**
27	GTX	701	(France) Vortex V8	2:00.074
28	GT4	412	(Switzerland) Centri Porsche Ticino	2:01.439
29	GT3-Am	13	(Germany) Team Zakspeed	No time

=== Race ===
==== Part 1 ====
Class winner in bold.

Pos	Class	No.	Team	Drivers	Chassis	Time/Reason	Laps
Pos	Class	No.	Team	Drivers	Engine	Time/Reason	Laps
1	**GT3-Am**	**91**	**(Germany) Herberth Motorsport**	**(Switzerland) Daniel Allemann (Germany) Ralf Bohn (Germany) Alfred Renauer (Germany) Robert Renauer**	**Porsche 911 GT3 R (2019)**	**4:01:23.258**	**109**
1	**GT3-Am**	**91**	**(Germany) Herberth Motorsport**	**(Switzerland) Daniel Allemann (Germany) Ralf Bohn (Germany) Alfred Renauer (Germany) Robert Renauer**	**Porsche 4.0 L Flat-6**	**4:01:23.258**	**109**
2	GT3-Am	7	(Italy) Dinamic Motorsport	(Italy) Matteo Cairoli (Switzerland) Mauro Calamia (Switzerland) Stefano Monaco (Italy) Roberto Pampanini	Porsche 911 GT3 R	+1:33.810	109
2	GT3-Am	7	(Italy) Dinamic Motorsport	(Italy) Matteo Cairoli (Switzerland) Mauro Calamia (Switzerland) Stefano Monaco (Italy) Roberto Pampanini	Porsche 4.0 L Flat-6	+1:33.810	109
3	GT3-Am	11	(Czech Republic) MiddleCap racing with Scuderia Praha	(Czech Republic) Josef Král (Slovakia) Matúš Výboh (Slovakia) Miroslav Výboh	Ferrari 488 GT3	+1:39.668	109
3	GT3-Am	11	(Czech Republic) MiddleCap racing with Scuderia Praha	(Czech Republic) Josef Král (Slovakia) Matúš Výboh (Slovakia) Miroslav Výboh	Ferrari 3.9 L Twin-Turbo V8	+1:39.668	109
4	GT3-Am	92	(Germany) Herberth Motorsport	(Germany) Stefan Aust (Germany) "Bobby Gonzales" (Germany) Jürgen Häring (Germany) Marco Seefried	Porsche 911 GT3 R (2019)	+2:34.132	109
4	GT3-Am	92	(Germany) Herberth Motorsport	(Germany) Stefan Aust (Germany) "Bobby Gonzales" (Germany) Jürgen Häring (Germany) Marco Seefried	Porsche 4.0 L Flat-6	+2:34.132	109
5	GT3-Am	66	(Switzerland) Haegeli by T2 Racing	(Germany) Marc Basseng (Switzerland) Pieder Decurtins (Germany) Manuel Lauck	Porsche 911 GT3 R (2019)	+1 Lap	108
5	GT3-Am	66	(Switzerland) Haegeli by T2 Racing	(Germany) Marc Basseng (Switzerland) Pieder Decurtins (Germany) Manuel Lauck	Porsche 4.0 L Flat-6	+1 Lap	108
6	GT3-Am	9	(Netherlands) Equipe Verschuur	(Netherlands) Harrie Kolen (Netherlands) Erik van Loon (Netherlands) Mike Verschuur	Renault R.S. 01 F GT3	+1 Lap	108
6	GT3-Am	9	(Netherlands) Equipe Verschuur	(Netherlands) Harrie Kolen (Netherlands) Erik van Loon (Netherlands) Mike Verschuur	Nissan VR38DETT 3.0 L V6	+1 Lap	108
7	GT3-Am	11	(Germany) Hella Pagid - racing one	(Italy) Daniele Di Amato (Germany) Francesco Lopez (Germany) Axel Sartingen (Germany) Daniel Schwerfeld	Ferrari 488 GT3	+1 Lap	108
7	GT3-Am	11	(Germany) Hella Pagid - racing one	(Italy) Daniele Di Amato (Germany) Francesco Lopez (Germany) Axel Sartingen (Germany) Daniel Schwerfeld	Ferrari 3.9 L Twin-Turbo V8	+1 Lap	108
8	GT3-Am	18	(Germany) Rutronik Racing by TECE	(Austria) Michael Doppelmayr (Germany) Elia Erhart (Germany) Swen Herberger (Germany) Pierre Kaffer	Audi R8 LMS Evo	+1 Lap	108
8	GT3-Am	18	(Germany) Rutronik Racing by TECE	(Austria) Michael Doppelmayr (Germany) Elia Erhart (Germany) Swen Herberger (Germany) Pierre Kaffer	Audi 5.2 L V10	+1 Lap	108
9	GT3-Am	85	(United States) CP Racing	(United States) Charles Espenlaub (United States) Joe Foster (United States) Shane Lewis (United States) Charles Putman	Mercedes-AMG GT3 Evo	+1 Lap	108
9	GT3-Am	85	(United States) CP Racing	(United States) Charles Espenlaub (United States) Joe Foster (United States) Shane Lewis (United States) Charles Putman	Mercedes-AMG M159 6.2 L V8	+1 Lap	108
10	**GTX**	**724**	**(Germany) Reiter Engineering**	**(Austria) Eike Angermayr (United States) Nicolai Elghanayan (Austria) Horst Felbermayr Jr. (Norway) Mads Siljehaug**	**KTM X-Bow GTX Concept**	**+2 Laps**	**107**
10	**GTX**	**724**	**(Germany) Reiter Engineering**	**(Austria) Eike Angermayr (United States) Nicolai Elghanayan (Austria) Horst Felbermayr Jr. (Norway) Mads Siljehaug**	**Audi 2.5 L I5**	**+2 Laps**	**107**
11	**991**	**955**	**(Romania) Willi Motorsport by Ebimotors**	**(Italy) Fabrizio Broggi (Italy) Sabino de Castro (Romania) Sergiu Nicolae**	**Porsche 991 GT3 II Cup**	**+4 Laps**	**105**
11	**991**	**955**	**(Romania) Willi Motorsport by Ebimotors**	**(Italy) Fabrizio Broggi (Italy) Sabino de Castro (Romania) Sergiu Nicolae**	**Porsche 4.0 L Flat-6**	**+4 Laps**	**105**
12	GT3-Am	58	(Italy) MP Racing	(Italy) Corinna Gostner (Italy) David Gostner (Italy) Manuela Gostner (Italy) Thomas Gostner (Italy) Giorgio Sernagiotto	Mercedes-AMG GT3 Evo	+4 Laps	105
12	GT3-Am	58	(Italy) MP Racing	(Italy) Corinna Gostner (Italy) David Gostner (Italy) Manuela Gostner (Italy) Thomas Gostner (Italy) Giorgio Sernagiotto	Mercedes-AMG M159 6.2 L V8	+4 Laps	105
13	991	910	(Lithuania) Juta Racing	(Lithuania) Julius Adomavičius (Lithuania) Andrius Gelžinis (Lithuania) Jonas Gelžinis	Porsche 991 GT3 II Cup	+4 Laps	105
13	991	910	(Lithuania) Juta Racing	(Lithuania) Julius Adomavičius (Lithuania) Andrius Gelžinis (Lithuania) Jonas Gelžinis	Porsche 4.0 L Flat-6	+4 Laps	105
14	GT3-Am	8	(Switzerland) Kessel Racing	(Italy) Alessandro Cutrera (Italy) Leonardo-Maria del Vecchio (Italy) Marco Frezza (Italy) Marco Talarico	Ferrari 488 GT3 Evo (2019)	+5 Laps	104
14	GT3-Am	8	(Switzerland) Kessel Racing	(Italy) Alessandro Cutrera (Italy) Leonardo-Maria del Vecchio (Italy) Marco Frezza (Italy) Marco Talarico	Ferrari 3.9 L Twin-Turbo V8	+5 Laps	104
15	991	967	(San Marino) GDL Racing	(Finland) Axel Blom (Switzerland) Mario Cordoni (Argentina) Andres Bruno Josephsohn (Argentina) Andres Michel Josephsohn	Porsche 991 GT3 II Cup	+5 Laps	104
15	991	967	(San Marino) GDL Racing	(Finland) Axel Blom (Switzerland) Mario Cordoni (Argentina) Andres Bruno Josephsohn (Argentina) Andres Michel Josephsohn	Porsche 4.0 L Flat-6	+5 Laps	104
16	991	920	(Switzerland) Stadler Motorsport	(Switzerland) Marc Arn (Switzerland) Paul Kasper (Switzerland) Jan Klingelnberg (Switzerland) Ramon Werner	Porsche 991 GT3 II Cup	+6 Laps	103
16	991	920	(Switzerland) Stadler Motorsport	(Switzerland) Marc Arn (Switzerland) Paul Kasper (Switzerland) Jan Klingelnberg (Switzerland) Ramon Werner	Porsche 4.0 L Flat-6	+6 Laps	103
17	**TCR**	**175**	**(Netherlands) NKPP Racing by Bas Koeten Racing**	**(Netherlands) Gijs Bessem (Netherlands) Harry Hilders**	**CUPRA León TCR**	**+7 Laps**	**102**
17	**TCR**	**175**	**(Netherlands) NKPP Racing by Bas Koeten Racing**	**(Netherlands) Gijs Bessem (Netherlands) Harry Hilders**	**Volkswagen 2.0 L I4**	**+7 Laps**	**102**
18	TCR	188	(Belgium) AC Motorsport	(Belgium) Mathieu Detr (France) Stéphane Perrin	Audi RS 3 LMS TCR	+7 Laps	102
18	TCR	188	(Belgium) AC Motorsport	(Belgium) Mathieu Detr (France) Stéphane Perrin	Volkswagen 2.0 L I4	+7 Laps	102
19	TCR	101	(Netherlands) Red Camel-Jordans.nl	(Netherlands) Ivo Breukers (Netherlands) Rik Breukers	CUPRA León TCR	+8 Laps	101
19	TCR	101	(Netherlands) Red Camel-Jordans.nl	(Netherlands) Ivo Breukers (Netherlands) Rik Breukers	Volkswagen 2.0 L I4	+8 Laps	101
20	991	924	(Germany) PROFILDOORS by Huber Racing	(Italy) Andreas Corradina (Russia) Merabi Mekvabishvili (Russia) Nikolay Gadetsky	Porsche 991 GT3 II Cup	+8 Laps	101
20	991	924	(Germany) PROFILDOORS by Huber Racing	(Italy) Andreas Corradina (Russia) Merabi Mekvabishvili (Russia) Nikolay Gadetsky	Porsche 4.0 L Flat-6	+8 Laps	101
21	991	973	(Italy) Ebimotors	(Italy) Massimiliano Donzelli (Italy) Gianluca Giorgi (Italy) Paolo Gnemmi (Italy) Orlando Mattia Di Giusto (Italy) Luigi Peroni	Porsche 991 GT3 II Cup	+8 Laps	101
21	991	973	(Italy) Ebimotors	(Italy) Massimiliano Donzelli (Italy) Gianluca Giorgi (Italy) Paolo Gnemmi (Italy) Orlando Mattia Di Giusto (Italy) Luigi Peroni	Porsche 4.0 L Flat-6	+8 Laps	101
22	TCR	108	(Spain) RC2 Junior Team by Cabra Racing	(Spain) Felipe Fernández (Spain) Rubén Fernández (Spain) Victor Fernández	Cupra León Competición TCR	+9 Laps	100
22	TCR	108	(Spain) RC2 Junior Team by Cabra Racing	(Spain) Felipe Fernández (Spain) Rubén Fernández (Spain) Victor Fernández	Volkswagen 2.0 L I4	+9 Laps	100
23	GTX	720	(Lithuania) Siauliai - RD Signs racing team	(Lithuania) Audrius Butkevicius (Lithuania) Ramunas Capkauskas (Lithuania) Egidijus Gutaravicius (Lithuania) Paulius Paskevicius	Lamborghini Huracán Super Trofeo	+9 Laps	100
23	GTX	720	(Lithuania) Siauliai - RD Signs racing team	(Lithuania) Audrius Butkevicius (Lithuania) Ramunas Capkauskas (Lithuania) Egidijus Gutaravicius (Lithuania) Paulius Paskevicius	Lamborghini 5.2 L V10	+9 Laps	100
24	GTX	701	(France) Vortex V8	(France) Lionel Amrouche (France) Philippe Bonnel (Switzerland) Karen Gaillard (France) Boris Gimond	Vortex 1.0 GTX	+9 Laps	100
24	GTX	701	(France) Vortex V8	(France) Lionel Amrouche (France) Philippe Bonnel (Switzerland) Karen Gaillard (France) Boris Gimond	Chevrolet 6.2 L V8	+9 Laps	100
25	**TCX**	**206**	**(Belgium) Speed Lover**	**(Belgium) Kurt Hensen (Belgium) Philippe Wils**	**Porsche 718 Cayman GT4 Clubsport**	**+10 Laps**	**99**
25	**TCX**	**206**	**(Belgium) Speed Lover**	**(Belgium) Kurt Hensen (Belgium) Philippe Wils**	**Porsche 3.8 L Flat-6**	**+10 Laps**	**99**
26	TCR	1	(Switzerland) Autorama Motorsport by Wolf-Power Racing	(Norway) Emil Heyerdahl (Austria) Constantin Kletzer (Germany) Marcus Menden (Switzerland) Walter Reho	Volkswagen Golf GTI TCR	+11 Laps	98
26	TCR	1	(Switzerland) Autorama Motorsport by Wolf-Power Racing	(Norway) Emil Heyerdahl (Austria) Constantin Kletzer (Germany) Marcus Menden (Switzerland) Walter Reho	Volkswagen 2.0 L I4	+11 Laps	98
27	**GT4**	**412**	**(Switzerland) Centri Porsche Ticino**	**(Netherlands) Christian de Kant (Italy) Alessandro Fogliani (Germany) Thomas Herbst (Switzerland) Valerio Presezzi (Italy) Antonio Spavone**	**Porsche 718 Cayman GT4 Clubsport**	**+11 Laps**	**98**
27	**GT4**	**412**	**(Switzerland) Centri Porsche Ticino**	**(Netherlands) Christian de Kant (Italy) Alessandro Fogliani (Germany) Thomas Herbst (Switzerland) Valerio Presezzi (Italy) Antonio Spavone**	**Porsche 3.8 L Flat-6**	**+11 Laps**	**98**
28	GTX	712	(France) Vortex V8	(France) Philippe Bonnel (France) Pierre Fontaine (Switzerland) Nicolas Nobs	Vortex 1.0 GTX	+12 Laps	97
28	GTX	712	(France) Vortex V8	(France) Philippe Bonnel (France) Pierre Fontaine (Switzerland) Nicolas Nobs	Chevrolet 6.2 L V8	+12 Laps	97
29	991	969	(San Marino) GDL Racing	(Italy) Gianluca de Lorenzi (Italy) Maurizio Fratti (Italy) Giacomo Giubergia (Italy) Roberto Rayneri	Porsche 991 GT3 II Cup	+12 Laps	97
29	991	969	(San Marino) GDL Racing	(Italy) Gianluca de Lorenzi (Italy) Maurizio Fratti (Italy) Giacomo Giubergia (Italy) Roberto Rayneri	Porsche 4.0 L Flat-6	+12 Laps	97
30	TCX	278	(United Kingdom) CWS Engineering	(United States) Jean-Francois Brunot (United Kingdom) James Kell (United Kingdom) Colin White	Ginetta G55 Supercup	+13 Laps	96
30	TCX	278	(United Kingdom) CWS Engineering	(United States) Jean-Francois Brunot (United Kingdom) James Kell (United Kingdom) Colin White	Ford Cyclone 3.7 L V6	+13 Laps	96
31	TCR	121	(Lithuania) Juta Racing Junior	(Lithuania) Nerijus Baliunas (Lithuania) Algirdas Gelžinis (Lithuania) Ignas Gelžinis (Lithuania) Aurimas Jablonskis (Lithuania) Audrius Navickas	CUPRA León TCR	+14 Laps	95
31	TCR	121	(Lithuania) Juta Racing Junior	(Lithuania) Nerijus Baliunas (Lithuania) Algirdas Gelžinis (Lithuania) Ignas Gelžinis (Lithuania) Aurimas Jablonskis (Lithuania) Audrius Navickas	Volkswagen 2.0 L I4	+14 Laps	95
32	GTX	726	(Italy) Lotus PB Racing	(Italy) Massimo Abbati (Italy) Stefano D'Aste (Italy) Daniel Grimaldi (Monaco) Vito Utzieri	Lotus Exige V6 Cup R	+15 Laps	94
32	GTX	726	(Italy) Lotus PB Racing	(Italy) Massimo Abbati (Italy) Stefano D'Aste (Italy) Daniel Grimaldi (Monaco) Vito Utzieri	Toyota 3.5 L V6	+15 Laps	94
33	991	909	(Luxembourg) DUWO Racing	(Russia) Andrey Mukovoz (Russia) Sergey Peregudov (Russia) Stanislav Sidoruk	Porsche 991 GT3 II Cup	+17 Laps	92
33	991	909	(Luxembourg) DUWO Racing	(Russia) Andrey Mukovoz (Russia) Sergey Peregudov (Russia) Stanislav Sidoruk	Porsche 4.0 L Flat-6	+17 Laps	92
34	TCR	147	(Italy) Élite Motorsport	(Italy) Pierluigi Alessandri (Italy) Simone Patrinicola (Italy) Gianvito Rossi	Volkswagen Golf GTI TCR	+18 Laps	91
34	TCR	147	(Italy) Élite Motorsport	(Italy) Pierluigi Alessandri (Italy) Simone Patrinicola (Italy) Gianvito Rossi	Volkswagen 2.0 L I4	+18 Laps	91
35	TCX	205	(Italy) Lotus PB Racing	(Italy) Denis Bonvini (Switzerland) Luca Flaccador (Switzerland) Maurizio Fortina (Italy) Alberto Grisi (Switzerland) Franco Nespoli	Lotus Elise Cup PB-R	+23 Laps	86
35	TCX	205	(Italy) Lotus PB Racing	(Italy) Denis Bonvini (Switzerland) Luca Flaccador (Switzerland) Maurizio Fortina (Italy) Alberto Grisi (Switzerland) Franco Nespoli	Toyota 1.4 L I4	+23 Laps	86
36 DNF	GT4	438	(Canada) ST Racing	(United States) Chandler Hull (United States) Jon Miller (Canada) Samantha Tan	BMW M4 GT4	+26 Laps	83
36 DNF	GT4	438	(Canada) ST Racing	(United States) Chandler Hull (United States) Jon Miller (Canada) Samantha Tan	BMW N55 3.0 L Twin-Turbo I6	+26 Laps	83
37 DNF	TCX	202	(Netherlands) JR Motorsport	(Netherlands) Bas Schouten (Netherlands) Coos Schouten (Netherlands) Dirk Schouten	BMW M3 E46 GTR	+35 Laps	74
37 DNF	TCX	202	(Netherlands) JR Motorsport	(Netherlands) Bas Schouten (Netherlands) Coos Schouten (Netherlands) Dirk Schouten	BMW 4.0 L V8	+35 Laps	74
38 DNF	GT3-Am	34	(Germany) Car Collection Motorsport	(Germany) Gustav Edelhoff (Germany) Elmar Grimm (Germany) Johannes Kirchhoff	Audi R8 LMS Evo	+36 Laps	73
38 DNF	GT3-Am	34	(Germany) Car Collection Motorsport	(Germany) Gustav Edelhoff (Germany) Elmar Grimm (Germany) Johannes Kirchhoff	Audi 5.2 L V10	+36 Laps	73
39	TCX	203	(Netherlands) JR Motorsport	(Belgium) Ward Sluys (Netherlands) Sandra van der Sloot (Netherlands) Ted van Vliet	BMW M3 F80	+41 Laps	68
39	TCX	203	(Netherlands) JR Motorsport	(Belgium) Ward Sluys (Netherlands) Sandra van der Sloot (Netherlands) Ted van Vliet	BMW S55B30T0 3.0 L I6	+41 Laps	68
40 DNF	GTX	710	(Germany) Leipert Motorsport	(Canada) Ray Calvin (Germany) Matthias Hoffsümmer (Luxembourg) Gabriele Rindone	Lamborghini Huracán Super Trofeo Evo	+60 Laps	49
40 DNF	GTX	710	(Germany) Leipert Motorsport	(Canada) Ray Calvin (Germany) Matthias Hoffsümmer (Luxembourg) Gabriele Rindone	Lamborghini 5.2 L V10	+60 Laps	49
41	GT3-Am	13	(Germany) Team Zakspeed	(Russia) Evgeny Kireev (Russia) Victor Shaytar (Russia) Sergey Stolyarov	Mercedes-AMG GT3 Evo	+68 Laps	41
41	GT3-Am	13	(Germany) Team Zakspeed	(Russia) Evgeny Kireev (Russia) Victor Shaytar (Russia) Sergey Stolyarov	Mercedes-AMG M159 6.2 L V8	+68 Laps	41
DNS	TCR	112	(Switzerland) Autorama Motorsport by Wolf-Power Racing	(Switzerland) Jasmin Preisig (Austria) Constantin Kletzer (Italy) Roberto Ferri	Volkswagen Golf GTI TCR	Did Not Start	
DNS	TCR	112	(Switzerland) Autorama Motorsport by Wolf-Power Racing	(Switzerland) Jasmin Preisig (Austria) Constantin Kletzer (Italy) Roberto Ferri	Volkswagen 2.0 L I4	Did Not Start	

==== Part 2 ====
Class winner in bold.

Pos	Class	No.	Team	Drivers	Chassis	Time/Reason	Laps
Pos	Class	No.	Team	Drivers	Engine	Time/Reason	Laps
1	**GT3-Am**	**91**	**(Germany) Herberth Motorsport**	**(Switzerland) Daniel Allemann (Germany) Ralf Bohn (Germany) Alfred Renauer (Germany) Robert Renauer**	**Porsche 911 GT3 R (2019)**	**8:01:15.528**	**335**
1	**GT3-Am**	**91**	**(Germany) Herberth Motorsport**	**(Switzerland) Daniel Allemann (Germany) Ralf Bohn (Germany) Alfred Renauer (Germany) Robert Renauer**	**Porsche 4.0 L Flat-6**	**8:01:15.528**	**335**
2	GT3-Am	11	(Czech Republic) MiddleCap racing with Scuderia Praha	(Czech Republic) Josef Král (Slovakia) Matúš Výboh (Slovakia) Miroslav Výboh	Ferrari 488 GT3	+3 Laps	332
2	GT3-Am	11	(Czech Republic) MiddleCap racing with Scuderia Praha	(Czech Republic) Josef Král (Slovakia) Matúš Výboh (Slovakia) Miroslav Výboh	Ferrari 3.9 L Twin-Turbo V8	+3 Laps	332
3	GT3-Am	7	(Italy) Dinamic Motorsport	(Italy) Matteo Cairoli (Switzerland) Mauro Calamia (Switzerland) Stefano Monaco (Italy) Roberto Pampanini	Porsche 911 GT3 R	+3 Laps	332
3	GT3-Am	7	(Italy) Dinamic Motorsport	(Italy) Matteo Cairoli (Switzerland) Mauro Calamia (Switzerland) Stefano Monaco (Italy) Roberto Pampanini	Porsche 4.0 L Flat-6	+3 Laps	332
4	GT3-Am	92	(Germany) Herberth Motorsport	(Germany) Stefan Aust (Germany) "Bobby Gonzales" (Germany) Jürgen Häring (Germany) Marco Seefried	Porsche 911 GT3 R (2019)	+5 Laps	330
4	GT3-Am	92	(Germany) Herberth Motorsport	(Germany) Stefan Aust (Germany) "Bobby Gonzales" (Germany) Jürgen Häring (Germany) Marco Seefried	Porsche 4.0 L Flat-6	+5 Laps	330
5	GT3-Am	66	(Switzerland) Haegeli by T2 Racing	(Germany) Marc Basseng (Switzerland) Pieder Decurtins (Germany) Manuel Lauck	Porsche 911 GT3 R (2019)	+6 Laps	329
5	GT3-Am	66	(Switzerland) Haegeli by T2 Racing	(Germany) Marc Basseng (Switzerland) Pieder Decurtins (Germany) Manuel Lauck	Porsche 4.0 L Flat-6	+6 Laps	329
6	GT3-Am	18	(Germany) Rutronik Racing by TECE	(Austria) Michael Doppelmayr (Germany) Elia Erhart (Germany) Swen Herberger (Germany) Pierre Kaffer	Audi R8 LMS Evo	+6 Laps	329
6	GT3-Am	18	(Germany) Rutronik Racing by TECE	(Austria) Michael Doppelmayr (Germany) Elia Erhart (Germany) Swen Herberger (Germany) Pierre Kaffer	Audi 5.2 L V10	+6 Laps	329
7	GT3-Am	85	(United States) CP Racing	(United States) Charles Espenlaub (United States) Joe Foster (United States) Shane Lewis (United States) Charles Putman	Mercedes-AMG GT3 Evo	+7 Laps	328
7	GT3-Am	85	(United States) CP Racing	(United States) Charles Espenlaub (United States) Joe Foster (United States) Shane Lewis (United States) Charles Putman	Mercedes-AMG M159 6.2 L V8	+7 Laps	328
8	GT3-Am	11	(Germany) Hella Pagid - racing one	(Italy) Daniele Di Amato (Germany) Francesco Lopez (Germany) Axel Sartingen (Germany) Daniel Schwerfeld	Ferrari 488 GT3	+8 Laps	327
8	GT3-Am	11	(Germany) Hella Pagid - racing one	(Italy) Daniele Di Amato (Germany) Francesco Lopez (Germany) Axel Sartingen (Germany) Daniel Schwerfeld	Ferrari 3.9 L Twin-Turbo V8	+8 Laps	327
9	GT3-Am	9	(Netherlands) Equipe Verschuur	(Netherlands) Harrie Kolen (Netherlands) Erik van Loon (Netherlands) Mike Verschuur	Renault R.S. 01 F GT3	+13 Laps	322
9	GT3-Am	9	(Netherlands) Equipe Verschuur	(Netherlands) Harrie Kolen (Netherlands) Erik van Loon (Netherlands) Mike Verschuur	Nissan VR38DETT 3.0 L V6	+13 Laps	322
10	**GTX**	**724**	**(Germany) Reiter Engineering**	**(Austria) Eike Angermayr (United States) Nicolai Elghanayan (Austria) Horst Felbermayr Jr. (Norway) Mads Siljehaug**	**KTM X-Bow GTX Concept**	**+14 Laps**	**321**
10	**GTX**	**724**	**(Germany) Reiter Engineering**	**(Austria) Eike Angermayr (United States) Nicolai Elghanayan (Austria) Horst Felbermayr Jr. (Norway) Mads Siljehaug**	**Audi 2.5 L I5**	**+14 Laps**	**321**
11	GT3-Am	8	(Switzerland) Kessel Racing	(Italy) Alessandro Cutrera (Italy) Leonardo-Maria del Vecchio (Italy) Marco Frezza (Italy) Marco Talarico	Ferrari 488 GT3 Evo (2019)	+19 Laps	316
11	GT3-Am	8	(Switzerland) Kessel Racing	(Italy) Alessandro Cutrera (Italy) Leonardo-Maria del Vecchio (Italy) Marco Frezza (Italy) Marco Talarico	Ferrari 3.9 L Twin-Turbo V8	+19 Laps	316
12	**991**	**955**	**(Romania) Willi Motorsport by Ebimotors**	**(Italy) Fabrizio Broggi (Italy) Sabino de Castro (Romania) Sergiu Nicolae**	**Porsche 991 GT3 II Cup**	**+20 Laps**	**315**
12	**991**	**955**	**(Romania) Willi Motorsport by Ebimotors**	**(Italy) Fabrizio Broggi (Italy) Sabino de Castro (Romania) Sergiu Nicolae**	**Porsche 4.0 L Flat-6**	**+20 Laps**	**315**
13	991	910	(Lithuania) Juta Racing	(Lithuania) Julius Adomavičius (Lithuania) Andrius Gelžinis (Lithuania) Jonas Gelžinis	Porsche 991 GT3 II Cup	+23 Laps	312
13	991	910	(Lithuania) Juta Racing	(Lithuania) Julius Adomavičius (Lithuania) Andrius Gelžinis (Lithuania) Jonas Gelžinis	Porsche 4.0 L Flat-6	+23 Laps	312
14	991	924	(Germany) PROFILDOORS by Huber Racing	(Italy) Andreas Corradina (Russia) Merabi Mekvabishvili (Russia) Nikolay Gadetsky	Porsche 991 GT3 II Cup	+25 Laps	310
14	991	924	(Germany) PROFILDOORS by Huber Racing	(Italy) Andreas Corradina (Russia) Merabi Mekvabishvili (Russia) Nikolay Gadetsky	Porsche 4.0 L Flat-6	+25 Laps	310
15	**TCR**	**101**	**(Netherlands) Red Camel-Jordans.nl**	**(Netherlands) Ivo Breukers (Netherlands) Rik Breukers**	**CUPRA León TCR**	**+25 Laps**	**310**
15	**TCR**	**101**	**(Netherlands) Red Camel-Jordans.nl**	**(Netherlands) Ivo Breukers (Netherlands) Rik Breukers**	**Volkswagen 2.0 L I4**	**+25 Laps**	**310**
16	TCR	175	(Netherlands) NKPP Racing by Bas Koeten Racing	(Netherlands) Gijs Bessem (Netherlands) Harry Hilders	CUPRA León TCR	+27 Laps	308
16	TCR	175	(Netherlands) NKPP Racing by Bas Koeten Racing	(Netherlands) Gijs Bessem (Netherlands) Harry Hilders	Volkswagen 2.0 L I4	+27 Laps	308
17	TCR	188	(Belgium) AC Motorsport	(Belgium) Mathieu Detry (France) Stéphane Perrin	Audi RS 3 LMS TCR	+27 Laps	308
17	TCR	188	(Belgium) AC Motorsport	(Belgium) Mathieu Detry (France) Stéphane Perrin	Volkswagen 2.0 L I4	+27 Laps	308
18	GT3-Am	58	(Italy) MP Racing	(Italy) Corinna Gostner (Italy) David Gostner (Italy) Manuela Gostner (Italy) Thomas Gostner (Italy) Giorgio Sernagiotto	Mercedes-AMG GT3 Evo	+29 Laps	306
18	GT3-Am	58	(Italy) MP Racing	(Italy) Corinna Gostner (Italy) David Gostner (Italy) Manuela Gostner (Italy) Thomas Gostner (Italy) Giorgio Sernagiotto	Mercedes-AMG M159 6.2 L V8	+29 Laps	306
19	991	973	(Italy) Ebimotors	(Italy) Massimiliano Donzelli (Italy) Gianluca Giorgi (Italy) Paolo Gnemmi (Italy) Orlando Mattia Di Giusto (Italy) Luigi Peroni	Porsche 991 GT3 II Cup	+30 Laps	305
19	991	973	(Italy) Ebimotors	(Italy) Massimiliano Donzelli (Italy) Gianluca Giorgi (Italy) Paolo Gnemmi (Italy) Orlando Mattia Di Giusto (Italy) Luigi Peroni	Porsche 4.0 L Flat-6	+30 Laps	305
20	TCR	108	(Spain) RC2 Junior Team by Cabra Racing	(Spain) Felipe Fernández (Spain) Rubén Fernández (Spain) Victor Fernández	Cupra León Competición TCR	+30 Laps	305
20	TCR	108	(Spain) RC2 Junior Team by Cabra Racing	(Spain) Felipe Fernández (Spain) Rubén Fernández (Spain) Victor Fernández	Volkswagen 2.0 L I4	+30 Laps	305
21	991	909	(Luxembourg) DUWO Racing	(Russia) Andrey Mukovoz (Russia) Sergey Peregudov (Russia) Stanislav Sidoruk	Porsche 991 GT3 II Cup	+30 Laps	305
21	991	909	(Luxembourg) DUWO Racing	(Russia) Andrey Mukovoz (Russia) Sergey Peregudov (Russia) Stanislav Sidoruk	Porsche 4.0 L Flat-6	+30 Laps	305
22	TCR	1	(Switzerland) Autorama Motorsport by Wolf-Power Racing	(Norway) Emil Heyerdahl (Austria) Constantin Kletzer (Germany) Marcus Menden (Switzerland) Walter Reho	Volkswagen Golf GTI TCR	+32 Laps	303
22	TCR	1	(Switzerland) Autorama Motorsport by Wolf-Power Racing	(Norway) Emil Heyerdahl (Austria) Constantin Kletzer (Germany) Marcus Menden (Switzerland) Walter Reho	Volkswagen 2.0 L I4	+32 Laps	303
23	GTX	712	(France) Vortex V8	(France) Philippe Bonnel (France) Pierre Fontaine (Switzerland) Nicolas Nobs	Vortex 1.0 GTX	+38 Laps	297
23	GTX	712	(France) Vortex V8	(France) Philippe Bonnel (France) Pierre Fontaine (Switzerland) Nicolas Nobs	Chevrolet 6.2 L V8	+38 Laps	297
24	**TCX**	**206**	**(Belgium) Speed Lover**	**(Belgium) Kurt Hensen (Belgium) Philippe Wils**	**Porsche 718 Cayman GT4 Clubsport**	**+41 Laps**	**294**
24	**TCX**	**206**	**(Belgium) Speed Lover**	**(Belgium) Kurt Hensen (Belgium) Philippe Wils**	**Porsche 3.8 L Flat-6**	**+41 Laps**	**294**
25	TCR	121	(Lithuania) Juta Racing Junior	(Lithuania) Nerijus Baliunas (Lithuania) Algirdas Gelžinis (Lithuania) Ignas Gelžinis (Lithuania) Aurimas Jablonskis (Lithuania) Audrius Navickas	CUPRA León TCR	+43 Laps	292
25	TCR	121	(Lithuania) Juta Racing Junior	(Lithuania) Nerijus Baliunas (Lithuania) Algirdas Gelžinis (Lithuania) Ignas Gelžinis (Lithuania) Aurimas Jablonskis (Lithuania) Audrius Navickas	Volkswagen 2.0 L I4	+43 Laps	292
26	**GT4**	**412**	**(Switzerland) Centri Porsche Ticino**	**(Netherlands) Christian de Kant (Italy) Alessandro Fogliani (Germany) Thomas Herbst (Switzerland) Valerio Presezzi (Italy) Antonio Spavone**	**Porsche 718 Cayman GT4 Clubsport**	**+46 Laps**	**289**
26	**GT4**	**412**	**(Switzerland) Centri Porsche Ticino**	**(Netherlands) Christian de Kant (Italy) Alessandro Fogliani (Germany) Thomas Herbst (Switzerland) Valerio Presezzi (Italy) Antonio Spavone**	**Porsche 3.8 L Flat-6**	**+46 Laps**	**289**
27	991	967	(San Marino) GDL Racing	(Finland) Axel Blom (Switzerland) Mario Cordoni (Argentina) Andres Bruno Josephsohn (Argentina) Andres Michel Josephsohn	Porsche 991 GT3 II Cup	+52 Laps	283
27	991	967	(San Marino) GDL Racing	(Finland) Axel Blom (Switzerland) Mario Cordoni (Argentina) Andres Bruno Josephsohn (Argentina) Andres Michel Josephsohn	Porsche 4.0 L Flat-6	+52 Laps	283
28	TCX	278	(United Kingdom) CWS Engineering	(United States) Jean-Francois Brunot (United Kingdom) James Kell (United Kingdom) Colin White	Ginetta G55 Supercup	+54 Laps	281
28	TCX	278	(United Kingdom) CWS Engineering	(United States) Jean-Francois Brunot (United Kingdom) James Kell (United Kingdom) Colin White	Ford Cyclone 3.7 L V6	+54 Laps	281
29	GT4	438	(Canada) ST Racing	(United States) Chandler Hull (United States) Jon Miller (Canada) Samantha Tan	BMW M4 GT4	+63 Laps	272
29	GT4	438	(Canada) ST Racing	(United States) Chandler Hull (United States) Jon Miller (Canada) Samantha Tan	BMW N55 3.0 L Twin-Turbo I6	+63 Laps	272
30	GTX	701	(France) Vortex V8	(France) Lionel Amrouche (France) Philippe Bonnel (Switzerland) Karen Gaillard (France) Boris Gimond	Vortex 1.0 GTX	+67 Laps	268
30	GTX	701	(France) Vortex V8	(France) Lionel Amrouche (France) Philippe Bonnel (Switzerland) Karen Gaillard (France) Boris Gimond	Chevrolet 6.2 L V8	+67 Laps	268
31	TCX	202	(Netherlands) JR Motorsport	(Netherlands) Bas Schouten (Netherlands) Coos Schouten (Netherlands) Dirk Schouten	BMW M3 E46 GTR	+68 Laps	267
31	TCX	202	(Netherlands) JR Motorsport	(Netherlands) Bas Schouten (Netherlands) Coos Schouten (Netherlands) Dirk Schouten	BMW 4.0 L V8	+68 Laps	267
32	GTX	720	(Lithuania) Siauliai - RD Signs racing team	(Lithuania) Audrius Butkevicius (Lithuania) Ramunas Capkauskas (Lithuania) Egidijus Gutaravicius (Lithuania) Paulius Paskevicius	Lamborghini Huracán Super Trofeo	+70 Laps	265
32	GTX	720	(Lithuania) Siauliai - RD Signs racing team	(Lithuania) Audrius Butkevicius (Lithuania) Ramunas Capkauskas (Lithuania) Egidijus Gutaravicius (Lithuania) Paulius Paskevicius	Lamborghini 5.2 L V10	+70 Laps	265
33	TCR	147	(Italy) Élite Motorsport	(Italy) Pierluigi Alessandri (Italy) Simone Patrinicola (Italy) Gianvito Rossi	Volkswagen Golf GTI TCR	+80 Laps	255
33	TCR	147	(Italy) Élite Motorsport	(Italy) Pierluigi Alessandri (Italy) Simone Patrinicola (Italy) Gianvito Rossi	Volkswagen 2.0 L I4	+80 Laps	255
34 DNF	991	969	(San Marino) GDL Racing	(Italy) Gianluca de Lorenzi (Italy) Maurizio Fratti (Italy) Giacomo Giubergia (Italy) Roberto Rayneri	Porsche 991 GT3 II Cup	+107 Laps	228
34 DNF	991	969	(San Marino) GDL Racing	(Italy) Gianluca de Lorenzi (Italy) Maurizio Fratti (Italy) Giacomo Giubergia (Italy) Roberto Rayneri	Porsche 4.0 L Flat-6	+107 Laps	228
35	TCX	205	(Italy) Lotus PB Racing	(Italy) Denis Bonvini (Switzerland) Luca Flaccador (Switzerland) Maurizio Fortina (Italy) Alberto Grisi (Switzerland) Franco Nespoli	Lotus Elise Cup PB-R	+109 Laps	226
35	TCX	205	(Italy) Lotus PB Racing	(Italy) Denis Bonvini (Switzerland) Luca Flaccador (Switzerland) Maurizio Fortina (Italy) Alberto Grisi (Switzerland) Franco Nespoli	Toyota 1.4 L I4	+109 Laps	226
36 DNF	TCX	203	(Netherlands) JR Motorsport	(Belgium) Ward Sluys (Netherlands) Sandra van der Sloot (Netherlands) Ted van Vliet	BMW M3 F80	+218 Laps	117
36 DNF	TCX	203	(Netherlands) JR Motorsport	(Belgium) Ward Sluys (Netherlands) Sandra van der Sloot (Netherlands) Ted van Vliet	BMW S55B30T0 3.0 L I6	+218 Laps	117
DNF	991	920	(Germany) Stadler Motorsport	(Switzerland) Marc Arn (Switzerland) Paul Kasper (Switzerland) Jan Klingelnberg (Switzerland) Ramon Werner	Porsche 991 GT3 II Cup	Accident	138
DNF	991	920	(Germany) Stadler Motorsport	(Switzerland) Marc Arn (Switzerland) Paul Kasper (Switzerland) Jan Klingelnberg (Switzerland) Ramon Werner	Porsche 4.0 L Flat-6	Accident	138
DNF	GTX	726	(Italy) Lotus PB Racing	(Italy) Massimo Abbati (Italy) Stefano D'Aste (Italy) Daniel Grimaldi (Monaco) Vito Utzieri	Lotus Exige V6 Cup R	Engine	102
DNF	GTX	726	(Italy) Lotus PB Racing	(Italy) Massimo Abbati (Italy) Stefano D'Aste (Italy) Daniel Grimaldi (Monaco) Vito Utzieri	Toyota 3.5 L V6	Engine	102
DNF	GT3-Am	34	(Germany) Car Collection Motorsport	(Germany) Gustav Edelhoff (Germany) Elmar Grimm (Germany) Johannes Kirchhoff	Audi R8 LMS Evo	Damage	73
DNF	GT3-Am	34	(Germany) Car Collection Motorsport	(Germany) Gustav Edelhoff (Germany) Elmar Grimm (Germany) Johannes Kirchhoff	Audi 5.2 L V10	Damage	73
DNF	GT3-Am	13	(Germany) Team Zakspeed	(Russia) Evgeny Kireev (Russia) Victor Shaytar (Russia) Sergey Stolyarov	Mercedes-AMG GT3 Evo	Suspension	49
DNF	GT3-Am	13	(Germany) Team Zakspeed	(Russia) Evgeny Kireev (Russia) Victor Shaytar (Russia) Sergey Stolyarov	Mercedes-AMG M159 6.2 L V8	Suspension	49
DNF	GTX	710	(Germany) Leipert Motorsport	(Canada) Ray Calvin (Germany) Matthias Hoffsümmer (Luxembourg) Gabriele Rindone	Lamborghini Huracán Super Trofeo Evo	Crash	49
DNF	GTX	710	(Germany) Leipert Motorsport	(Canada) Ray Calvin (Germany) Matthias Hoffsümmer (Luxembourg) Gabriele Rindone	Lamborghini 5.2 L V10	Crash	49
DNS	TCR	112	(Switzerland) Autorama Motorsport by Wolf-Power Racing	(Switzerland) Jasmin Preisig (Austria) Constantin Kletzer (Italy) Roberto Ferri	Volkswagen Golf GTI TCR	Did Not Start	
DNS	TCR	112	(Switzerland) Autorama Motorsport by Wolf-Power Racing	(Switzerland) Jasmin Preisig (Austria) Constantin Kletzer (Italy) Roberto Ferri	Volkswagen 2.0 L I4	Did Not Start	

== Footnotes ==
24H GT Series
Previous race: Dubai 24 Hour	2021 season	Next race: 12 Hours of Circuit Paul Ricard

24H TCE Series
Previous race: Dubai 24 Hour	2021 season	Next race: 12 Hours of Circuit Paul Ricard
