= 2021 Dubai 24 Hour =

Motorsport endurance race

The layout of the Dubai Autodrome.

The 2021 Hankook Dubai 24 Hour was the 16th running of the Dubai 24 Hour. It was also the first round of the 2021 24H GT Series and TCE Series. The race was won by Julien Andlauer, Frédéric Fatien, Alain Ferté, Mathieu Jaminet and Axcil Jefferies in the #36 GPX Racing Porsche 911 GT3 R.

== Schedule ==
Date	Time (local: GST)	Event	Distance
Thursday, 14 January	09:45 - 10:45	Practice (TCE)	60 mins
Thursday, 14 January	11:50 - 12:50	Practice (GT)	60 mins
Thursday, 14 January	12:55 - 13:25	Practice (Both classes)	30 mins
Thursday, 14 January	14:30 - 15:00	Qualifying - TCE	30 Mins
Thursday, 14 January	15:30 - 16:00	Qualifying - GT	30 Mins
Thursday, 14 January	18:00 - 19:30	Night Practice	90 mins
Friday, 15 January	11:00 - 1:30	Warm up	30 mins
Friday, 15 January	15:00	Race	24 Hours
Saturday, 16 January	15:00	Race	24 Hours

== Entry list ==
52 cars were entered into the event; 34 GT cars and 18 TCEs.

Team	Car	Engine	No.	Drivers
GT3-Pro (8 entries)
(Germany) Mercedes-AMG Team HRT Bilstein	Mercedes-AMG GT3 Evo	Mercedes-AMG M159 6.2 L V8	4	(United Arab Emirates) Khaled Al Qubaisi (Germany) Patrick Assenheimer (Germany) Maro Engel (Germany) Hubert Haupt (United Kingdom) Ryan Ratcliffe
(Italy) Dinamic Motorsport	Porsche 911 GT3 R (2019)	Porsche 4.0 L Flat-6	7	(Italy) Matteo Cairoli (Switzerland) Mauro Calamia (Switzerland) Stefano Monaco (Italy) Roberto Pampanini
(Belgium) Team WRT	Audi R8 LMS Evo	Audi 5.2 L V10	31	(United Kingdom) Frank Bird (Denmark) Benjamin Goethe (Belgium) Louis Machiels (South Africa) Kelvin van der Linde (Belgium) Dries Vanthoor
(United Arab Emirates) GPX Racing	Porsche 911 GT3 R (2019)	Porsche 4.0 L Flat-6	36	(France) Julien Andlauer (United Arab Emirates) Frédéric Fatien (France) Alain Ferté (France) Mathieu Jaminet (Zimbabwe) Axcil Jefferies
(Austria) GRT Grasser Racing Team	Lamborghini Huracán GT3 Evo	Lamborghini 5.2 L V10	63	(Switzerland) Adrian Amstutz (Italy) Mirko Bortolotti (Netherlands) Rik Breukers (Switzerland) Rolf Ineichen
(France) Racetivity	Mercedes-AMG GT3 Evo	Mercedes-AMG M159 6.2 L V8	83	(France) Emmanuel Collard (France) François Perrodo (France) Charles-Henri Samani (France) Matthieu Vaxivière
(Germany) Herberth Motorsport	Porsche 911 GT3 R (2019)	Porsche 4.0 L Flat-6	92	(Austria) Klaus Bachler (Germany) Jürgen Häring (Germany) Vincent Kolb (Germany) Sven Müller (Germany) Wolfgang Triller
(Germany) Attempto Racing	Audi R8 LMS Evo	Audi 5.2 L V10	99	(Germany) Alex Aka (United Kingdom) Finlay Hutchison (Germany) Christopher Mies (Austria) Philipp Sager (Germany) Markus Winkelhock
GT3-Am (9 entries)
(United Arab Emirates) Mercedes-AMG Team HRT Abu Dhabi Racing	Mercedes-AMG GT3 Evo	Mercedes-AMG M159 6.2 L V8	5	(United Arab Emirates) Khaled Al Qubaisi (Germany) Patrick Assenheimer (Germany) Nico Bastian (Germany) Valentin Pierburg (Germany) Florian Scholze
(Germany) Team Zakspeed	Dodge SRT Viper GT3-R	Viper 8.4 L V10	13	(Russia) Evgeny Kireev (Germany) Manuel Lauck (Germany) Hendrik Still (Russia) Victor Shaytar (Russia) Sergey Stolyarov
(Netherlands) MP Motorsport	Mercedes-AMG GT3	Mercedes-AMG M159 6.2 L V8	19	(Netherlands) Bert de Heus (Netherlands) Daniël de Jong (Netherlands) Henk de Jong (Netherlands) Jaap van Lagen
(Germany) Car Collection Motorsport	Audi R8 LMS Evo	Audi 5.2 L V10	34	(Germany) Gustav Edelhoff (Germany) Max Edelhoff (Germany) Elmar Grimm (Germany) Johannes Kirchhoff
(Germany) Car Collection Motorsport	Audi R8 LMS Evo	Audi 5.2 L V10	88	(Netherlands) Milan Dontje (Denmark) Kim Holmgaard (Germany) Martin Lechmann (Germany) Tim Müller (Germany) Johannes Stengel
(United Kingdom) Inception Racing with Optimum Motorsport	McLaren 720S GT3	McLaren M840T 4.0 L Turbo V8	72	(United States) Brendan Iribe (United Kingdom) Ollie Millroy (United Kingdom) Nick Moss (United Kingdom) Joe Osborne
(United States) CP Racing	Mercedes-AMG GT3 Evo	Mercedes-AMG M159 6.2 L V8	85	(United States) Charles Espenlaub (United States) Joe Foster (United States) Shane Lewis (United States) Charles Putman
(Germany) Herberth Motorsport	Porsche 911 GT3 R (2019)	Porsche 4.0 L Flat-6	91	(Switzerland) Daniel Allemann (Germany) Ralf Bohn (Germany) Alfred Renauer (Germany) Robert Renauer
(Germany) Herberth Motorsport	Porsche 911 GT3 R (2019)	Porsche 4.0 L Flat-6	93	(Hong Kong) Antares Au (Germany) Steffen Görig (United Kingdom) Daniel Lloyd (United Kingdom) John Loggie
GTX (4 entries)
(France) Vortex V8	Vortex 1.0 GTX	Chevrolet 6.2 L V8	701	(France) Lionel Amrouche (France) Philippe Bonnel (Switzerland) Karen Gaillard (France) Alban Varutti
(Slovakia) ARC Bratislava	Lamborghini Huracán Super Trofeo (2017)	Lamborghini 5.2 L V10	707	(Lithuania) Justas Jonušis (Slovakia) Miro Konôpka (Slovakia) Mat'o Konopka (Slovakia) Zdeno Mikulasko (Estonia) Thomas Padovani
GT3 Poland	Lamborghini Huracán Super Trofeo Evo	Lamborghini 5.2 L V10	708	(Poland) Pawel Kowalski (Poland) Andrzej Lewandowski (Poland) Rafal Mikrut (Poland) Grzegorz Moczulski (Poland) Bartosz Opiola
(Germany) Leipert Motorsport	Lamborghini Huracán Super Trofeo Evo	Lamborghini 5.2 L V10	710	(United States) Gregg Gorski (United States) Oscar Lee (Germany) Fidel Leib (Switzerland) Kurt Thiel (United States) Gerhard Watzinger
991 (8 entries)
(Luxembourg) DUWO Racing	Porsche 991 GT3 Cup II	Porsche 4.0 L Flat-6	909	(Russia) Andrey Mukovoz (Russia) Sergey Peregudov (Russia) Stanislav Sidoruk (Luxembourg) Dylan Pereira
(Germany) Nebulus Racing by Huber	Porsche 991 GT3 Cup II	Porsche 4.0 L Flat-6	924	(Germany) Matthias Hoffsümmer (Russia) Merabi Mekvabishvili (Russia) Ilya Melnikov (Netherlands) Larry ten Voorde (Luxembourg) Gabriele Rindone
(Germany) HRT Performance	Porsche 991 GT3 Cup II	Porsche 4.0 L Flat-6	928	(Sweden) Erik Behrens (Germany) Fabio Citignola (Germany) Sebastian Freymuth (Germany) Leon Köhler (United Kingdom) JM Littman
(Germany) HRT Performance	Porsche 991 GT3 Cup II	Porsche 4.0 L Flat-6	929	(Germany) Oliver Freymuth (Russia) Nikolay Gadetsky (Germany) Holger Harmsen (Germany) Kim André Hauschild (United Kingdom) JM Littman
(Belgium) Speed Lover	Porsche 991 GT3 Cup II	Porsche 4.0 L Flat-6	978	(France) Michael Blanchemain (Belgium) Olivier Dons (Belgium) Pieter Ooms (Belgium) Pierre-Yves Paque (Belgium) Jürgen van Hover
(Belgium) Speed Lover	Porsche 991 GT3 Cup II	Porsche 4.0 L Flat-6	979	(Belgium) Kurt Hensen (Belgium) Rolf Lietart (France) Eric Mouez (Belgium) Jürgen van Hover (Belgium) Philippe Wils
(Germany) MRS GT-Racing	Porsche 991 GT3 Cup II	Porsche 4.0 L Flat-6	989	(United Arab Emirates) Saif Alameri (Netherlands) Jeroen Bleekemolen (Finland) Jukka Honkavuori (United States) Tim Pappas
(Netherlands) NKPP Racing by Bas Koeten Racing	Porsche 4.0 L Flat-6	Porsche 991 GT3 Cup II	991	(Netherlands) Gijs Bessem (Netherlands) Bob Herber (Netherlands) Harry Hilders (Netherlands) Roeland Voerman
GT4 (5 entries)
(Germany) PROsport Performance AMR	Aston Martin Vantage AMR GT4	Aston Martin 4.0 L Turbo V8	401	(Belgium) Rodrigue Gillion (Belgium) Stephane Lemeret (Denmark) Patrik Matthiesen (Austria) Constantin Schöll (Belgium) Nico Verdonck
(Canada) ST Racing	BMW M4 GT4	BMW N55 3.0 L Twin-Turbo I6	438	(United States) Chandler Hull (United States) Jon Miller (Canada) Samantha Tan (Canada) Nick Wittmer
(France) 3Y Technology	BMW M4 GT4	BMW N55 3.0 L Twin-Turbo I6	451	(Mozambique) Rodrigo Almeida (France) Gilles Lallement (United States) Vincent Piemonte (Denmark) Thomas Sørensen (France) Gilles Vannelet
(Germany) Team Avia Sorg Rennsport	BMW M4 GT4	BMW N55 3.0 L Twin-Turbo I6	452	(United Kingdom) Matt Brookes (Portugal) Luis Calheiros (Portugal) Paulo Macedo (Portugal) JJ Magalhães (Portugal) José Pires
(United Arab Emirates) Dragon Racing	Mercedes-AMG GT4	Mercedes-AMG M178 4.0 L V8	488	(United Kingdom) Adam Christodoulou (United Kingdom) Ollie Hancock (United Kingdom) John Hartshorne (Russia) Denis Remenyako
TCR (12 entries)
(Switzerland) Autorama Motorsport by Wolf-Power Racing	Volkswagen Golf GTI TCR	Volkswagen 2.0 L I4	1	(Norway) Emil Heyerdahl (Austria) Constantin Kletzer (Germany) Marlon Menden (Switzerland) Yannick Mettler (Switzerland) Jérôme Ogay
(Switzerland) Autorama Motorsport by Wolf-Power Racing	Volkswagen Golf GTI TCR	Volkswagen 2.0 L I4	112	(Switzerland) Miklas Born (Finland) Kari-Pekka Laaksonen (Switzerland) Yannick Mettler (Switzerland) Jasmin Preisig (Switzerland) Gustavo Xavier
(Switzerland) Autorama Motorsport by Wolf-Power Racing	Volkswagen Golf GTI TCR	Volkswagen 2.0 L I4	114	(United States) Reto Baumann (Switzerland) Miklas Born (United Kingdom) Rhys Lloyd (Germany) Marcus Menden (Switzerland) Dario Stanco
(Netherlands) Red Camel-Jordans.nl	CUPRA León TCR	Volkswagen 2.0 L I4	101	(Netherlands) Ivo Breukers (United Kingdom) Steven Liquorish (Germany) Henry Littig (Netherlands) Willem Meijer
(Thailand) BBR - Billionaire Boys Racing	CUPRA León TCR	Volkswagen 2.0 L I4	107	(Thailand) Anusorn Asiralertsiri (Thailand) Kantadhee Kusiri (Thailand) Kantasak Kusiri (Thailand) Chariya Nuya (Thailand) Tanart Sathienthirakul
(United Arab Emirates) RKC/ZRT	Audi RS 3 LMS TCR	Volkswagen 2.0 L I4	111	(United Kingdom) Ricky Coomber (Pakistan) Umair Khan (Republic of Ireland) Jonathan Mullan (United Kingdom) Jonathan Simmonds
(Switzerland) TOPCAR Sport	CUPRA León TCR	Volkswagen 2.0 L I4	131	(Switzerland) Fabian Danz (Switzerland) Ronny Jost (Germany) Benjamin Leuchter (Germany) Patrick Sing (Switzerland) Adrian Spescha
(Hungary) Zengő Motorsport	CUPRA León TCR	Volkswagen 2.0 L I4	133	(Hungary) Tamás Horváth (Hungary) Gábor Kismarty-Lechner (Hungary) Ga'l Szabolcs (Hungary) Csaba Tóth (Hungary) Zoltán Zengő
(United Kingdom) Simpson Motorsport	Audi RS 3 LMS TCR	Volkswagen 2.0 L I4	138	(United States) Gunnar Jeannette (United Kingdom) Sacha Kakad (United States) Rodrigo Sales (United Kingdom) Paul Smith (Romania) Mahail Zamfir
(Belgium) QSR Racing	Audi RS 3 LMS TCR	Volkswagen 2.0 L I4	154	(Belgium) Jimmy de Breucker (Belgium) Kobe de Breucker (Belgium) David Drieghe (Netherlands) Martin Huisman (Germany) Yevgen Sokolovskiy
(Belgium) AC Motorsport	Audi RS 3 LMS TCR	Volkswagen 2.0 L I4	188	(Belgium) Mathieu Detry (France) Sebastien Morales (France) Stéphane Perrin (France) Philippe Thirion
(Belgium) AC Motorsport	Audi RS 3 LMS TCR	Volkswagen 2.0 L I4	199	(France) Thierry Chkondali (United States) Maxwell Hanratty (Germany) Thomas Kiefer (France) Sebastien Lajoux (France) Mark Wallenwein
TCX (6 entries)
(Belgium) PK Carsport	BMW M2 ClubSport Racing	BMW S55B30T0 3.0 L I6	208	(Belgium) Peter Guelinckx (Belgium) Bert Longin (Belgium) Stienes Longin (Belgium) Stijn Lowette
(Denmark) Team Sally Racing	CUPRA León TCR	Volkswagen 2.0 L I4	218	(Denmark) Anders Lund (Denmark) Niels Nyboe (Denmark) Peter Obel (Denmark) Henrik Thomsen
(United Kingdom) CWS Engineering	Ginetta G55 Supercup	Ford Cyclone 3.7 L V6	278	(United States) Jean-Francois Brunot (United Kingdom) Adam Hayes (United Kingdom) Simon Orange (Germany) Michael Tischner (United Kingdom) Colin White
(United Kingdom) CWS Engineering	Ginetta G55 Supercup	Ford Cyclone 3.7 L V6	279	(South Africa) Paul Hill (South Africa) Mikaeel Pitamber (South Africa) Bradley Scorer (South Africa) Michael Stephens
(United Kingdom) CWS Engineering	Ginetta G55 Supercup	Ford Cyclone 3.7 L V6	280	(South Africa) Paul Hill (South Africa) Mikaeel Pitamber (South Africa) Bradley Scorer (South Africa) Michael Stephens
(Germany) fun-M Motorsport	BMW M240i Racing Cup	BMW 3.0 L I6	302	(Lithuania) Julius Adomavičius (United Kingdom) John Corbett (United Kingdom) George King (Germany) Simon Klemund (United Kingdom) James Winslow

== Results ==
=== Qualifying ===
==== GT ====
Fastest in class in **bold**.

Pos.	Class	No.	Team	Time
1	**GT3-Pro**	**92**	**(Germany) Herberth Motorsport**	**1:56.553**
2	GT3-Pro	63	(Austria) GRT Grasser Racing Team	1:57.126
3	GT3-Pro	36	(United Arab Emirates) GPX Racing	1:57.202
4	**GT3-Am**	**91**	**(Germany) Herberth Motorsport**	**1:57.264**
5	GT3-Pro	7	(Italy) Dinamic Motorsport	1:56.693 (Note: The No. 7 Dinamic Motorsport car was given a 3-place grid penalty for passing under Code 60 conditions.)
6	GT3-Am	5	(United Arab Emirates) Mercedes-AMG Team HRT Abu Dhabi Racing	1:57.290
7	GT3-Pro	4	(Germany) Mercedes-AMG Team HRT Bilstein	1:57.573
8	GT3-Pro	99	(Germany) Attempto Racing	1:57.749
9	GT3-Am	72	(United Kingdom) Inception Racing with Optimum Motorsport	1:57.815
10	GT3-Pro	31	(Belgium) Team WRT	1:57.980
11	GT3-Am	93	(Germany) Herberth Motorsport	1:58.033
12	GT3-Pro	83	(France) Raceivity	1:58.323
13	GT3-Am	19	(Netherlands) MP Motorsport	1:58.323
14	GT3-Am	34	(Germany) Car Collection Motorsport	1:58.735
15	GT3-Am	13	(Germany) Team Zakspeed	1:59.502
16	GT3-Am	85	(United States) CP Racing	1:59.809
17	**991**	**909**	**(Luxembourg) DUWO Racing**	**2:01.608**
18	**GTX**	**708**	**GT3 Poland**	**2:01.659**
19	991	928	(Germany) HRT Performance	2:01.692
20	GTX	710	(Germany) Leipert Motorsport	2:02.061
21	991	924	(Germany) Nebulus Racing by Huber	2:02.417
22	991	989	(Germany) MRS-GT Racing	2:02.456
23	GTX	701	(France) Vortex V8	2:03.259
24	991	929	(Germany) HRT Performance	2:04.001
25	GTX	707	(Slovakia) ARC Bratislava	2:05.202
26	991	991	(Netherlands) NKPP Racing by Bas Koeten Racing	2:06.021
27	991	979	(Belgium) Speed Lover	2:06.244
28	991	978	(Belgium) Speed Lover	2:07.395
29	**GT4**	**438**	**(Canada) ST Racing**	**2:08.824**
30	GT4	488	(United Arab Emirates) Dragon Racing	2:08.897
31	GT4	401	(Germany) PROsport Performance AMR	2:09.337
32	GT4	452	(Germany) Team Avia Sorg Rennsport	2:13.034
33	GT3-Am	88	(Germany) Car Collection Motorsport	No time
34	GT4	451	(France) 3Y Technology	No time

==== TCE ====
Fastest in class in **bold**.

Pos.	Class	No.	Team	Time
1	**TCR**	**112**	**(Switzerland) Autorama Motorsport by Wolf-Power Racing**	**2:09.405**
2	**TCX**	**279**	**(United Kingdom) CWS Engineering**	**2:09.681**
3	TCR	188	(Belgium) AC Motorsport	2:10.534
4	TCR	101	(Netherlands) Red Camel-Jordans.nl	2:10.676
5	TCR	138	(United Kingdom) Simpson Motorsport	2:10.959
6	TCR	107	(Thailand) BBR - Billionaire Boys Racing	2:10.994
7	TCR	131	(Switzerland) TOPCAR sport	2:11.013
8	TCR	1	(Switzerland) Autorama Motorsport by Wolf-Power Racing	2:11.062
9	TCR	133	(Hungary) Zengő Motorsport	2:11.138
10	TCR	199	(Belgium) AC Motorsport	2:12.588
11	TCX	208	(Belgium) PK Carsport	2:13.267
12	TCR	154	(Belgium) QSR Racing	2:13.382
13	TCR	114	(Switzerland) Autorama Motorsport by Wolf-Power Racing	2:13.798
14	TCR	111	(United Arab Emirates) RKC/ZRT	2:16.453
15	TCX	218	(Denmark) Team Sally Racing	2:16.661
16	TCX	302	(Germany) fun-M Motorsport	2:21.580
17	TCX	278	(United Kingdom) CWS Engineering	No time (Note: The No. CWS 278 and 280 Engineering cars hadn't been transported to Dubai in time for TCE qualifying, so the 279 was run as a test.)
18	TCX	280	(United Kingdom) CWS Engineering	No time

=== Race ===
Class winner in bold.

Pos	Class	No.	Team	Drivers	Chassis	Time/Reason	Laps
Pos	Class	No.	Team	Drivers	Engine	Time/Reason	Laps
1	**GT3-Pro**	**36**	**(United Arab Emirates) GPX Racing**	**(France) Julien Andlauer (United Arab Emirates) Frédéric Fatien (France) Alain Ferté (France) Mathieu Jaminet (Zimbabwe) Axcil Jefferies**	**Porsche 911 GT3 R**	**24:02:45.311**	**600**
1	**GT3-Pro**	**36**	**(United Arab Emirates) GPX Racing**	**(France) Julien Andlauer (United Arab Emirates) Frédéric Fatien (France) Alain Ferté (France) Mathieu Jaminet (Zimbabwe) Axcil Jefferies**	**Porsche 4.0 L Flat-6**	**24:02:45.311**	**600**
2	GT3-Pro	31	(Belgium) Team WRT	(United Kingdom) Frank Bird (Denmark) Benjamin Goethe (Belgium) Louis Machiels (South Africa) Kelvin van der Linde (Belgium) Dries Vanthoor	Audi R8 LMS Evo	+1 Lap	599
2	GT3-Pro	31	(Belgium) Team WRT	(United Kingdom) Frank Bird (Denmark) Benjamin Goethe (Belgium) Louis Machiels (South Africa) Kelvin van der Linde (Belgium) Dries Vanthoor	Audi 5.2 L V10	+1 Lap	599
3	GT3-Pro	4	(Germany) Mercedes-AMG Team HRT Bilstein	(United Arab Emirates) Khaled Al Qubaisi (Germany) Patrick Assenheimer (Germany) Maro Engel (Germany) Hubert Haupt (United Kingdom) Ryan Ratcliffe	Mercedes-AMG GT3 Evo	+1 Lap	599
3	GT3-Pro	4	(Germany) Mercedes-AMG Team HRT Bilstein	(United Arab Emirates) Khaled Al Qubaisi (Germany) Patrick Assenheimer (Germany) Maro Engel (Germany) Hubert Haupt (United Kingdom) Ryan Ratcliffe	Mercedes-AMG M159 6.2 L V8	+1 Lap	599
4	GT3-Pro	63	(Austria) GRT Grasser Racing Team	(Switzerland) Adrian Amstutz (Italy) Mirko Bortolotti (Netherlands) Rik Breukers (Switzerland) Rolf Ineichen	Lamborghini Huracán GT3 Evo	+2 Laps	598
4	GT3-Pro	63	(Austria) GRT Grasser Racing Team	(Switzerland) Adrian Amstutz (Italy) Mirko Bortolotti (Netherlands) Rik Breukers (Switzerland) Rolf Ineichen	Lamborghini 5.2 L V10	+2 Laps	598
5	**GT3-Am**	**5**	**(United Arab Emirates) Mercedes-AMG Team HRT Abu Dhabi Racing**	**(United Arab Emirates) Khaled Al Qubaisi (Germany) Patrick Assenheimer (Germany) Nico Bastian (Germany) Valentin Pierburg (Germany) Florian Scholze**	**Mercedes-AMG GT3 Evo**	**+8 Laps**	**592**
5	**GT3-Am**	**5**	**(United Arab Emirates) Mercedes-AMG Team HRT Abu Dhabi Racing**	**(United Arab Emirates) Khaled Al Qubaisi (Germany) Patrick Assenheimer (Germany) Nico Bastian (Germany) Valentin Pierburg (Germany) Florian Scholze**	**Mercedes-AMG M159 6.2 L V8**	**+8 Laps**	**592**
6	GT3-Am	34	(Germany) Car Collection Motorsport	(Germany) Gustav Edelhoff (Germany) Max Edelhoff (Germany) Elmar Grimm (Germany) Johannes Dr. Kirchhoff	Audi R8 LMS Evo	+12 Laps	588
6	GT3-Am	34	(Germany) Car Collection Motorsport	(Germany) Gustav Edelhoff (Germany) Max Edelhoff (Germany) Elmar Grimm (Germany) Johannes Dr. Kirchhoff	Audi 5.2 L V10	+12 Laps	588
7	GT3-Pro	83	(France) Racetivity	(France) Emmanuel Collard (France) François Perrodo (France) Charles-Henri Samani (France) Matthieu Vaxivière	Audi R8 LMS Evo	+15 Laps	585
7	GT3-Pro	83	(France) Racetivity	(France) Emmanuel Collard (France) François Perrodo (France) Charles-Henri Samani (France) Matthieu Vaxivière	Mercedes-AMG M159 6.2 L V8	+15 Laps	585
8	GT3-Am	88	(Germany) Car Collection Motorsport	(Netherlands) Milan Dontje (Denmark) Kim Holmgaard (Germany) Martin Lechmann (Germany) Tim Müller (Germany) Johannes Stengel	Audi R8 LMS Evo	+17 Laps	583
8	GT3-Am	88	(Germany) Car Collection Motorsport	(Netherlands) Milan Dontje (Denmark) Kim Holmgaard (Germany) Martin Lechmann (Germany) Tim Müller (Germany) Johannes Stengel	Audi 5.2 L V10	+17 Laps	583
9	GT3-Am	19	(Netherlands) MP Motorsport	(Netherlands) Bert de Heus (Netherlands) Daniël de Jong (Netherlands) Henk de Jong (Netherlands) Jaap van Lagen	Mercedes-AMG GT3	+23 Laps	577
9	GT3-Am	19	(Netherlands) MP Motorsport	(Netherlands) Bert de Heus (Netherlands) Daniël de Jong (Netherlands) Henk de Jong (Netherlands) Jaap van Lagen	Mercedes-AMG M159 6.2 L V8	+23 Laps	577
10	GT3-Am	72	(United Kingdom) Inception Racing with Optimum Motorsport	(United States) Brendan Iribe (United Kingdom) Ollie Millroy (United Kingdom) Nick Moss (United Kingdom) Joe Osborne	McLaren 720S GT3	+24 Laps	576
10	GT3-Am	72	(United Kingdom) Inception Racing with Optimum Motorsport	(United States) Brendan Iribe (United Kingdom) Ollie Millroy (United Kingdom) Nick Moss (United Kingdom) Joe Osborne	McLaren M840T 4.0 L Turbo V8	+24 Laps	576
11	GT3-Am	93	(Germany) Herberth Motorsport	(Hong Kong) Antares Au (Germany) Steffen Görig (United Kingdom) Daniel Lloyd (United Kingdom) John Loggie	Porsche 911 GT3 R (2019)	+30 Laps	570
11	GT3-Am	93	(Germany) Herberth Motorsport	(Hong Kong) Antares Au (Germany) Steffen Görig (United Kingdom) Daniel Lloyd (United Kingdom) John Loggie	Porsche 4.0 L Flat-6	+30 Laps	570
12	**991**	**991**	**(Netherlands) NKPP Racing by Bas Koeten Racing**	**(Netherlands) Gijs Bessem (Netherlands) Bob Herber (Netherlands) Harry Hilders (Netherlands) Roeland Voerman**	**Porsche 991 GT3 Cup II**	**+33 Laps**	**567**
12	**991**	**991**	**(Netherlands) NKPP Racing by Bas Koeten Racing**	**(Netherlands) Gijs Bessem (Netherlands) Bob Herber (Netherlands) Harry Hilders (Netherlands) Roeland Voerman**	**Porsche 4.0 L Flat-6**	**+33 Laps**	**567**
13	**GTX**	**710**	**(Germany) Leipert Motorsport**	**(United States) Gregg Gorski (United States) Oscar Lee (Germany) Fidel Leib (Switzerland) Kurt Thiel (United States) Gerhard Watzinger**	**Lamborghini Huracán Super Trofeo Evo**	**+42 Laps**	**558**
13	**GTX**	**710**	**(Germany) Leipert Motorsport**	**(United States) Gregg Gorski (United States) Oscar Lee (Germany) Fidel Leib (Switzerland) Kurt Thiel (United States) Gerhard Watzinger**	**Lamborghini 5.2 L V10**	**+42 Laps**	**558**
14	991	909	(Luxembourg) DUWO Racing	(Russia) Andrey Mukovoz (Russia) Sergey Peregudov (Russia) Stanislav Sidoruk (Luxembourg) Dylan Pereira	Porsche 991 GT3 Cup II	+53 Laps	547
14	991	909	(Luxembourg) DUWO Racing	(Russia) Andrey Mukovoz (Russia) Sergey Peregudov (Russia) Stanislav Sidoruk (Luxembourg) Dylan Pereira	Porsche 4.0 L Flat-6	+53 Laps	547
15	**GT4**	**438**	**(Canada) ST Racing**	**(United States) Chandler Hull (United States) Jon Miller (Canada) Samantha Tan (Canada) Nick Wittmer**	**BMW M4 GT4**	**+54 Laps**	**546**
15	**GT4**	**438**	**(Canada) ST Racing**	**(United States) Chandler Hull (United States) Jon Miller (Canada) Samantha Tan (Canada) Nick Wittmer**	**BMW N55 3.0 L Twin-Turbo I6**	**+54 Laps**	**546**
16	GT4	401	(Germany) PROsport Performance AMR	(Belgium) Rodrigue Gillion (Belgium) Stephane Lemeret (Denmark) Patrik Matthiesen (Austria) Constantin Schöll (Belgium) Nico Verdonck	Aston Martin Vantage AMR GT4	+57 Laps	543
16	GT4	401	(Germany) PROsport Performance AMR	(Belgium) Rodrigue Gillion (Belgium) Stephane Lemeret (Denmark) Patrik Matthiesen (Austria) Constantin Schöll (Belgium) Nico Verdonck	Aston Martin 4.0 L Turbo V8	+57 Laps	543
17	**TCR**	**131**	**(Switzerland) TOPCAR Sport**	**(Switzerland) Fabian Danz (Switzerland) Ronny Jost (Germany) Benjamin Leuchter (Germany) Patrick Sing (Switzerland) Adrian Spescha**	**CUPRA León TCR**	**+57 Laps**	**543**
17	**TCR**	**131**	**(Switzerland) TOPCAR Sport**	**(Switzerland) Fabian Danz (Switzerland) Ronny Jost (Germany) Benjamin Leuchter (Germany) Patrick Sing (Switzerland) Adrian Spescha**	**Volkswagen 2.0 L I4**	**+57 Laps**	**543**
18	TCR	112	(Switzerland) Autorama Motorsport by Wolf-Power Racing	(Switzerland) Miklas Born (Finland) Kari-Pekka Laaksonen (Switzerland) Yannick Mettler (Switzerland) Jasmin Preisig (Switzerland) Gustavo Xavier	Volkswagen Golf GTI TCR	+58 Laps	542
18	TCR	112	(Switzerland) Autorama Motorsport by Wolf-Power Racing	(Switzerland) Miklas Born (Finland) Kari-Pekka Laaksonen (Switzerland) Yannick Mettler (Switzerland) Jasmin Preisig (Switzerland) Gustavo Xavier	Volkswagen 2.0 L I4	+58 Laps	542
19 DNF	GT3-Pro	7	(Italy) Dinamic Motorsport	(Italy) Matteo Cairoli (Switzerland) Mauro Calamia (Switzerland) Stefano Monaco (Italy) Roberto Pampanini	Porsche 911 GT3 R	+59 Laps	541
19 DNF	GT3-Pro	7	(Italy) Dinamic Motorsport	(Italy) Matteo Cairoli (Switzerland) Mauro Calamia (Switzerland) Stefano Monaco (Italy) Roberto Pampanini	Porsche 4.0 L Flat-6	+59 Laps	541
20	GT4	488	(United Arab Emirates) Dragon Racing	(United Kingdom) Adam Christodoulou (United Kingdom) Ollie Hancock (United Kingdom) John Hartshorne (Russia) Denis Remenyako	Mercedes-AMG GT4	+60 Laps	540
20	GT4	488	(United Arab Emirates) Dragon Racing	(United Kingdom) Adam Christodoulou (United Kingdom) Ollie Hancock (United Kingdom) John Hartshorne (Russia) Denis Remenyako	Mercedes-AMG M178 4.0 L V8	+60 Laps	540
21	GT4	452	(Germany) Team Avia Sorg Rennsport	(United Kingdom) Matt Brookes (Portugal) Luis Calheiros (Portugal) Paulo Macedo (Portugal) JJ Magalhães (Portugal) José Pires	BMW M4 GT4	+65 Laps	535
21	GT4	452	(Germany) Team Avia Sorg Rennsport	(United Kingdom) Matt Brookes (Portugal) Luis Calheiros (Portugal) Paulo Macedo (Portugal) JJ Magalhães (Portugal) José Pires	BMW N55 3.0 L Twin-Turbo I6	+65 Laps	535
22	TCR	1	(Switzerland) Autorama Motorsport by Wolf-Power Racing	(Norway) Emil Heyerdahl (Austria) Constantin Kletzer (Germany) Marlon Menden (Switzerland) Yannick Mettler (Switzerland) Jérôme Ogay	Volkswagen Golf GTI TCR	+65 Laps	535
22	TCR	1	(Switzerland) Autorama Motorsport by Wolf-Power Racing	(Norway) Emil Heyerdahl (Austria) Constantin Kletzer (Germany) Marlon Menden (Switzerland) Yannick Mettler (Switzerland) Jérôme Ogay	Volkswagen 2.0 L I4	+65 Laps	535
23	TCR	188	(Belgium) AC Motorsport	(Belgium) Mathieu Detry (France) Sebastien Morales (France) Stéphane Perrin (France) Philippe Thirion	Audi RS 3 LMS TCR	+66 Laps	534
23	TCR	188	(Belgium) AC Motorsport	(Belgium) Mathieu Detry (France) Sebastien Morales (France) Stéphane Perrin (France) Philippe Thirion	Volkswagen 2.0 L I4	+66 Laps	534
24	TCR	199	(Belgium) AC Motorsport	(France) Thierry Chkondali (United States) Maxwell Hanratty (Germany) Thomas Kiefer (France) Sebastien Lajoux (France) Mark Wallenwein	Audi RS 3 LMS TCR	+73 Laps	527
24	TCR	199	(Belgium) AC Motorsport	(France) Thierry Chkondali (United States) Maxwell Hanratty (Germany) Thomas Kiefer (France) Sebastien Lajoux (France) Mark Wallenwein	Volkswagen 2.0 L I4	+73 Laps	527
25	**TCX**	**208**	**(Belgium) PK Carsport**	**(Belgium) Peter Guelinckx (Belgium) Bert Longin (Belgium) Stienes Longin (Belgium) Stijn Lowette**	**BMW M2 ClubSport Racing**	**+89 Laps**	**511**
25	**TCX**	**208**	**(Belgium) PK Carsport**	**(Belgium) Peter Guelinckx (Belgium) Bert Longin (Belgium) Stienes Longin (Belgium) Stijn Lowette**	**BMW S55B30T0 3.0 L I6**	**+89 Laps**	**511**
26	TCX	278	(United Kingdom) CWS Engineering	(United States) Jean-Francois Brunot (United Kingdom) Adam Hayes (United Kingdom) Simon Orange (Germany) Michael Tischner (United Kingdom) Colin White	Ginetta G55 Supercup	+96 Laps	504
26	TCX	278	(United Kingdom) CWS Engineering	(United States) Jean-Francois Brunot (United Kingdom) Adam Hayes (United Kingdom) Simon Orange (Germany) Michael Tischner (United Kingdom) Colin White	Ford Cyclone 3.7 L V6	+96 Laps	504
27 DNF	TCR	107	(Thailand) BBR - Billionaire Boys Racing	(Thailand) Anusorn Asiralertsiri (Thailand) Kantadhee Kusiri (Thailand) Kantasak Kusiri (Thailand) Chariya Nuya (Thailand) Tanart Sathienthirakul	CUPRA León TCR	+107 Laps	493
27 DNF	TCR	107	(Thailand) BBR - Billionaire Boys Racing	(Thailand) Anusorn Asiralertsiri (Thailand) Kantadhee Kusiri (Thailand) Kantasak Kusiri (Thailand) Chariya Nuya (Thailand) Tanart Sathienthirakul	Volkswagen 2.0 L I4	+107 Laps	493
28	TCX	302	(Germany) fun-M Motorsport	(Lithuania) Julius Adomavičius (United Kingdom) John Corbett (United Kingdom) George King (Germany) Simon Klemund (United Kingdom) James Winslow	BMW M240i Racing Cup	+114 Laps	486
28	TCX	302	(Germany) fun-M Motorsport	(Lithuania) Julius Adomavičius (United Kingdom) John Corbett (United Kingdom) George King (Germany) Simon Klemund (United Kingdom) James Winslow	BMW 3.0 L I6	+114 Laps	486
29	TCR	133	(Hungary) Zengő Motorsport	(Hungary) Tamás Horváth (Hungary) Gábor Kismarty-Lechner (Hungary) Ga'l Szabolcs (Hungary) Csaba Tóth (Hungary) Zoltán Zengő	CUPRA León TCR	+121 Laps	479
29	TCR	133	(Hungary) Zengő Motorsport	(Hungary) Tamás Horváth (Hungary) Gábor Kismarty-Lechner (Hungary) Ga'l Szabolcs (Hungary) Csaba Tóth (Hungary) Zoltán Zengő	Volkswagen 2.0 L I4	+121 Laps	479
30	TCX	280	(United Kingdom) CWS Engineering	(South Africa) Paul Hill (South Africa) Mikaeel Pitamber (South Africa) Bradley Scorer (South Africa) Michael Stephens	Ginetta G55 Supercup	+125 Laps	475
30	TCX	280	(United Kingdom) CWS Engineering	(South Africa) Paul Hill (South Africa) Mikaeel Pitamber (South Africa) Bradley Scorer (South Africa) Michael Stephens	Ford Cyclone 3.7 L V6	+125 Laps	475
31	TCR	138	(United Kingdom) Simpson Motorsport	(United States) Gunnar Jeannette (United Kingdom) Sacha Kakad (United States) Rodrigo Sales (United Kingdom) Paul Smith (Romania) Mahail Zamfir	Audi RS 3 LMS TCR	+125 Laps	475
31	TCR	138	(United Kingdom) Simpson Motorsport	(United States) Gunnar Jeannette (United Kingdom) Sacha Kakad (United States) Rodrigo Sales (United Kingdom) Paul Smith (Romania) Mahail Zamfir	Volkswagen 2.0 L I4	+125 Laps	475
32	991	989	(Germany) MRS GT-Racing	(United Arab Emirates) Saif Alameri (Netherlands) Jeroen Bleekemolen (Finland) Jukka Honkavuori (United States) Tim Pappas	Porsche 991 GT3 Cup II	+133 Laps	467
32	991	989	(Germany) MRS GT-Racing	(United Arab Emirates) Saif Alameri (Netherlands) Jeroen Bleekemolen (Finland) Jukka Honkavuori (United States) Tim Pappas	Porsche 4.0 L Flat-6	+133 Laps	467
33	GT4	451	(France) 3Y Technology	(Mozambique) Rodrigo Almeida (France) Gilles Lallement (United States) Vincent Piemonte (Denmark) Thomas Sørensen (France) Gilles Vannelet	BMW M4 GT4	+140 Laps	460
33	GT4	451	(France) 3Y Technology	(Mozambique) Rodrigo Almeida (France) Gilles Lallement (United States) Vincent Piemonte (Denmark) Thomas Sørensen (France) Gilles Vannelet	BMW N55 3.0 L Twin-Turbo I6	+140 Laps	460
34	TCX	218	(Denmark) Team Sally Racing	(Denmark) Anders Lund (Denmark) Niels Nyboe (Denmark) Peter Obel (Denmark) Henrik Thomsen	CUPRA León TCR	+145 Laps	455
34	TCX	218	(Denmark) Team Sally Racing	(Denmark) Anders Lund (Denmark) Niels Nyboe (Denmark) Peter Obel (Denmark) Henrik Thomsen	Volkswagen 2.0 L I4	+145 Laps	455
35	GTX	701	(France) Vortex V8	(France) Lionel Amrouche (France) Philippe Bonnel (Switzerland) Karen Gaillard (France) Alban Varutti	Vortex 1.0 GTX	+151 Laps	449
35	GTX	701	(France) Vortex V8	(France) Lionel Amrouche (France) Philippe Bonnel (Switzerland) Karen Gaillard (France) Alban Varutti	Chevrolet 6.2 L V8	+151 Laps	449
36 DNF	GTX	707	(Slovakia) ARC Bratislava	(Lithuania) Justas Jonušis (Slovakia) Miro Konôpka (Slovakia) Mat'o Konopka (Slovakia) Zdeno Mikulasko (Estonia) Thomas Padovani	Lamborghini Huracán Super Trofeo (2017)	+159 Laps	441
36 DNF	GTX	707	(Slovakia) ARC Bratislava	(Lithuania) Justas Jonušis (Slovakia) Miro Konôpka (Slovakia) Mat'o Konopka (Slovakia) Zdeno Mikulasko (Estonia) Thomas Padovani	Lamborghini 5.2 L V10	+159 Laps	441
37	TCR	101	(Netherlands) Red Camel-Jordans.nl	(Netherlands) Ivo Breukers (United Kingdom) Steven Liquorish (Germany) Henry Littig (Netherlands) Willem Meijer	CUPRA León TCR	+162 Laps	438
37	TCR	101	(Netherlands) Red Camel-Jordans.nl	(Netherlands) Ivo Breukers (United Kingdom) Steven Liquorish (Germany) Henry Littig (Netherlands) Willem Meijer	Volkswagen 2.0 L I4	+162 Laps	438
38 DNF	GT3-Am	85	(United States) CP Racing	(United States) Charles Espenlaub (United States) Joe Foster (United States) Shane Lewis (United States) Charles Putman	Mercedes-AMG GT3 Evo	+165 Laps	435
38 DNF	GT3-Am	85	(United States) CP Racing	(United States) Charles Espenlaub (United States) Joe Foster (United States) Shane Lewis (United States) Charles Putman	Mercedes-AMG M159 6.2 L V8	+165 Laps	435
39	GTX	708	GT 3 Poland	(Poland) Pawel Kowalski (Poland) Andrzej Lewandowski (Poland) Rafal Mikrut (Poland) Grzegorz Moczulski (Poland) Bartosz Opiola	Lamborghini Huracán Super Trofeo Evo	+169 Laps	431
39	GTX	708	GT 3 Poland	(Poland) Pawel Kowalski (Poland) Andrzej Lewandowski (Poland) Rafal Mikrut (Poland) Grzegorz Moczulski (Poland) Bartosz Opiola	Lamborghini 5.2 L V10	+169 Laps	431
40 DNF	991	924	(Germany) Nebulus Racing by Huber	(Germany) Matthias Hoffsümmer (Russia) Merabi Mekvabishvili (Russia) Ilya Melnikov (Netherlands) Larry ten Voorde (Luxembourg) Gabriele Rindone	Porsche 991 GT3 Cup II	+203 Laps	397
40 DNF	991	924	(Germany) Nebulus Racing by Huber	(Germany) Matthias Hoffsümmer (Russia) Merabi Mekvabishvili (Russia) Ilya Melnikov (Netherlands) Larry ten Voorde (Luxembourg) Gabriele Rindone	Porsche 4.0 L Flat-6	+203 Laps	397
41 DNF	991	978	(Belgium) Speed Lover	(France) Michael Blanchemain (Belgium) Olivier Dons (Belgium) Pieter Ooms (Belgium) Pierre-Yves Paque (Belgium) Jürgen van Hover	Porsche 991 GT3 Cup II	+255 Laps	345
41 DNF	991	978	(Belgium) Speed Lover	(France) Michael Blanchemain (Belgium) Olivier Dons (Belgium) Pieter Ooms (Belgium) Pierre-Yves Paque (Belgium) Jürgen van Hover	Porsche 4.0 L Flat-6	+255 Laps	345
42 DNF	TCR	154	(Belgium) QSR Racing	(Belgium) Jimmy de Breucker (Belgium) Kobe de Breucker (Belgium) David Drieghe (Netherlands) Martin Huisman (Germany) Yevgen Sokolovskiy	Audi RS 3 LMS TCR	+265 Laps	335
42 DNF	TCR	154	(Belgium) QSR Racing	(Belgium) Jimmy de Breucker (Belgium) Kobe de Breucker (Belgium) David Drieghe (Netherlands) Martin Huisman (Germany) Yevgen Sokolovskiy	Volkswagen 2.0 L I4	+265 Laps	335
DNF	GT3-Pro	92	(Germany) Herberth Motorsport	(Austria) Klaus Bachler (Germany) Jürgen Häring (Germany) Vincent Kolb (Germany) Sven Müller (Germany) Wolfgang Triller	Porsche 911 GT3 R (2019)	Mechanical	350
DNF	GT3-Pro	92	(Germany) Herberth Motorsport	(Austria) Klaus Bachler (Germany) Jürgen Häring (Germany) Vincent Kolb (Germany) Sven Müller (Germany) Wolfgang Triller	Porsche 4.0 L Flat-6	Mechanical	350
DNF	TCR	111	(United Arab Emirates) RKC/ZRT	(United Kingdom) Ricky Coomber (Pakistan) Umair Khan (Republic of Ireland) Jonathan Mullan (United Kingdom) Jonathan Simmonds	Audi RS 3 LMS TCR	Gearbox	315
DNF	TCR	111	(United Arab Emirates) RKC/ZRT	(United Kingdom) Ricky Coomber (Pakistan) Umair Khan (Republic of Ireland) Jonathan Mullan (United Kingdom) Jonathan Simmonds	Volkswagen 2.0 L I4	Gearbox	315
DNF	GT3-Pro	99	(Germany) Attempto Racing	(Germany) Alex Aka (United Kingdom) Finlay Hutchison (Germany) Christopher Mies (Austria) Philipp Sager (Germany) Markus Winkelhock	Audi R8 LMS Evo	Driveshaft	262
DNF	GT3-Pro	99	(Germany) Attempto Racing	(Germany) Alex Aka (United Kingdom) Finlay Hutchison (Germany) Christopher Mies (Austria) Philipp Sager (Germany) Markus Winkelhock	Audi 5.2 L V10	Driveshaft	262
DNF	991	979	(Belgium) Speed Lover	(Belgium) Kurt Hensen (Belgium) Rolf Lietart (France) Eric Mouez (Belgium) Jürgen van Hover (Belgium) Philippe Wils	Porsche 991 GT3 Cup II	Damage	261
DNF	991	979	(Belgium) Speed Lover	(Belgium) Kurt Hensen (Belgium) Rolf Lietart (France) Eric Mouez (Belgium) Jürgen van Hover (Belgium) Philippe Wils	Porsche 4.0 L Flat-6	Damage	261
DNF	TCR	114	(Switzerland) Autorama Motorsport by Wolf-Power Racing	(United States) Reto Baumann (Switzerland) Miklas Born (United Kingdom) Rhys Lloyd (Germany) Marcus Menden (Switzerland) Dario Stanco	Volkswagen Golf GTI TCR	Collision	207
DNF	TCR	114	(Switzerland) Autorama Motorsport by Wolf-Power Racing	(United States) Reto Baumann (Switzerland) Miklas Born (United Kingdom) Rhys Lloyd (Germany) Marcus Menden (Switzerland) Dario Stanco	Volkswagen 2.0 L I4	Collision	207
DNF	991	929	(Germany) HRT Performance	(Germany) Oliver Freymuth (Russia) Nikolay Gadetsky (Germany) Holger Harmsen (Germany) Kim André Hauschild (United Kingdom) JM Littman	Porsche 991 GT3 Cup II	Crash	114
DNF	991	929	(Germany) HRT Performance	(Germany) Oliver Freymuth (Russia) Nikolay Gadetsky (Germany) Holger Harmsen (Germany) Kim André Hauschild (United Kingdom) JM Littman	Porsche 4.0 L Flat-6	Crash	114
DNF	GT3-Am	91	(Germany) Herberth Motorsport	(Switzerland) Daniel Allemann (Germany) Ralf Bohn (Germany) Alfred Renauer (Germany) Robert Renauer	Porsche 911 GT3 R (2019)	Damage	60
DNF	GT3-Am	91	(Germany) Herberth Motorsport	(Switzerland) Daniel Allemann (Germany) Ralf Bohn (Germany) Alfred Renauer (Germany) Robert Renauer	Porsche 4.0 L Flat-6	Damage	60
DNF	GT3-Am	13	(Germany) Team Zakspeed	(Russia) Evgeny Kireev (Germany) Manuel Lauck (Germany) Hendrik Still (Russia) Victor Shaytar (Russia) Sergey Stolyarov	Dodge SRT Viper GT3-R	Gearbox	56
DNF	GT3-Am	13	(Germany) Team Zakspeed	(Russia) Evgeny Kireev (Germany) Manuel Lauck (Germany) Hendrik Still (Russia) Victor Shaytar (Russia) Sergey Stolyarov	Viper 8.4 L V10	Gearbox	56
DNF	991	928	(Germany) HRT Performance	(Sweden) Erik Behrens (Germany) Fabio Citignola (Germany) Sebastian Freymuth (Germany) Leon Köhler (United Kingdom) JM Littman	Porsche 991 GT3 Cup II	Crash	5
DNF	991	928	(Germany) HRT Performance	(Sweden) Erik Behrens (Germany) Fabio Citignola (Germany) Sebastian Freymuth (Germany) Leon Köhler (United Kingdom) JM Littman	Porsche 4.0 L Flat-6	Crash	5
DNS	TCX	279	(United Kingdom) CWS Engineering	(South Africa) Paul Hill (South Africa) Mikaeel Pitamber (South Africa) Bradley Scorer (South Africa) Michael Stephens	Ginetta G55 Supercup	Did Not Start (Note: The No. 279 CWS Ginetta ran in practice and TCE qualifying as the No. 278 and 280 cars hadn't been transported in time. No. 279's engine failed in night practice and the 278 and 280 cars arrived at 4am on race day and the decision was made for 279 to not start the race.)	0
DNS	TCX	279	(United Kingdom) CWS Engineering	(South Africa) Paul Hill (South Africa) Mikaeel Pitamber (South Africa) Bradley Scorer (South Africa) Michael Stephens	Ford Cyclone 3.7 L V6	Did Not Start	0

== Footnotes ==
24H GT Series
Previous race: none	2021 season	Next race: 12 Hours of Mugello

24H TCE Series
Previous race: none	2021 season	Next race: 12 Hours of Mugello
