= GT5 =

GT5 may refer to:

- Ginetta GT5 Challenge, an auto racing series
- Gran Turismo 5, a 2010 PlayStation 3 racing video game
- Gran Turismo 5 Prologue, a 2007 PlayStation 3 racing video game
