= Ginetta GT Academy =

British automobile racing series

- Logo of the Ginetta GT Academy as of the 2026 season
- Category: One-make racing by Ginetta
- Country: United Kingdom
- Inaugural season: 2021
- Constructors: Ginetta
- Engine suppliers: Ford
- Drivers' champion: GTA (United Kingdom) James Nicholas Rookie (United Kingdom) Sam Shrimpton
- Official website: Ginetta GT Academy Website

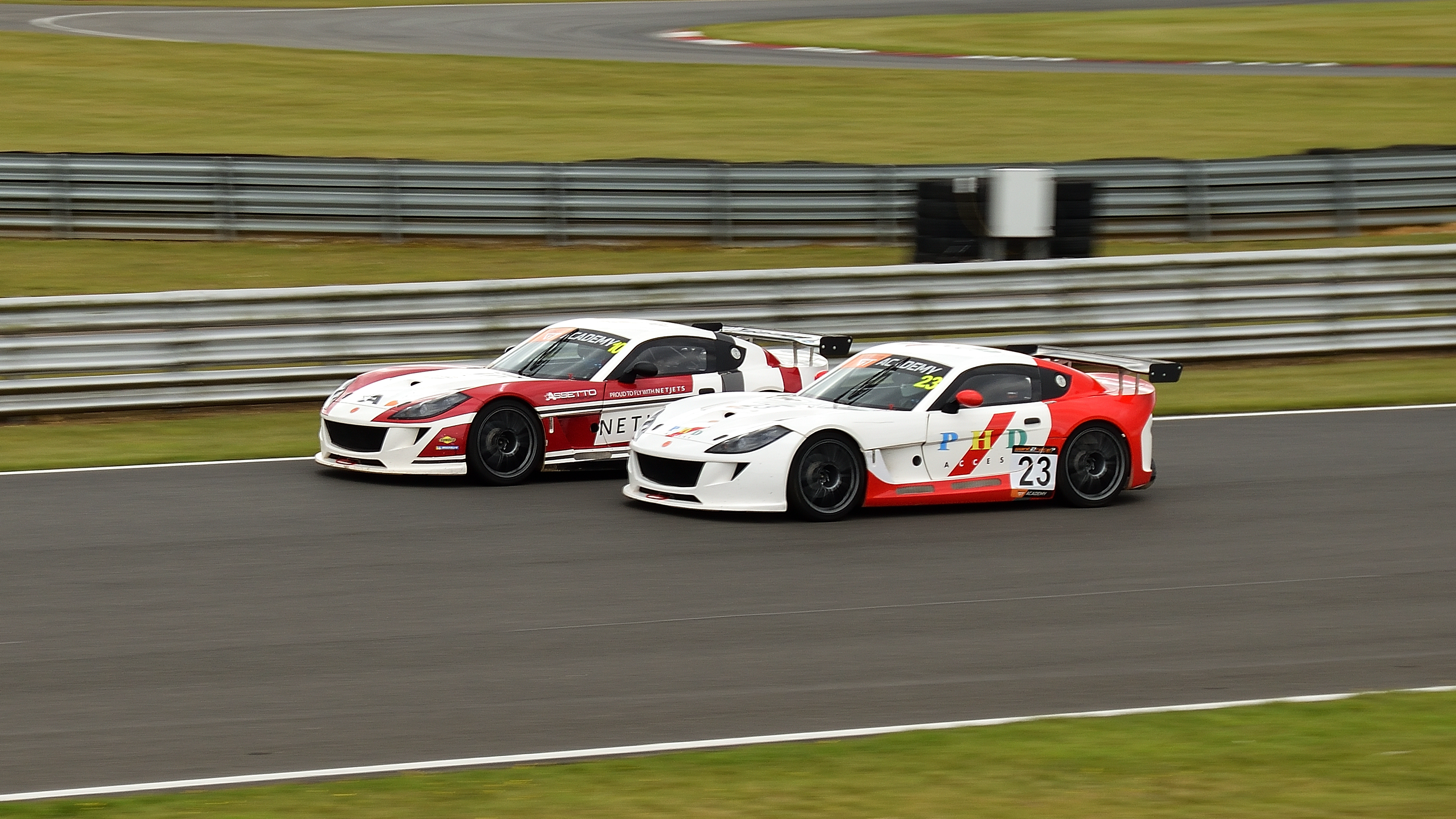
Ginetta G56 GTA at Snetterton Circuit in 2021.

The Ginetta GT Academy is a one-make racing series based in the United Kingdom. Launched as a series for drivers of any age and experience level, the series is split into an experienced class and a rookie class.

The series uses Ginetta G56 GTA class cars, outfitted with Ford 3.7 litre V6 engines and ran on Michelin tyres.

In 2025 Ginetta underwent a cost-reduction on their championships, and introduced the Quaife QBE69G gearbox to the G56 GTA, as well as introducing fixed set-ups, with both GTA and Rookie class cars running identical settings for dampers, roll bars, camber, rear wing and ride height. All changes to the cars were implemented free of charge along with the championship entry fee.

== Format ==
Practice sessions are typically run on Thursday and Friday before a race weekend. Race weekends typically include a qualifying session and three 20-minute races. Qualifying sets the grid for race one, with the second fastest times from this session setting the grid for race two, and the fastest times in race two setting the grid for race three.

Rounds have been run as support for the British GT Championship and BTCC, as well as being part of car show G-Fest, ran by Ginetta.

== Champions ==
Season	GTA Champion	Rookie Champion
2021	(United Kingdom) Toby Trice	(United Kingdom) Angus Whiteside
2022	(United Kingdom) Marc Warren	(India) Ravi Ramyead
2023	(United Kingdom) Nick White	(United Kingdom) Matt Shaw
2024	(United Kingdom) Julian Wantling	(United Kingdom) Mike Taylor
2025	(United Kingdom) James Nicholas	(United Kingdom) Sam Shrimpton

== See also ==
Ginetta Junior Championship
Ginetta GT4 Supercup
Ginetta GT Championship
