= 2023 24H GT Series =

International motorsport

The 2023 24H GT Series powered by Hankook is the ninth season of the 24H Series which mainly features drivers battling for championship points and titles. The fourteenth season since Creventic, the organiser and promoter of the series, organises multiple races a year. The races are contested with GT3-spec cars, GT4-spec cars, sports cars and 24H-Specials, like silhouette cars.

== Calendar ==
Round	Event	Circuit	Date
1	12 Hours of Mugello	Mugello Circuit, Scarperia e San Piero, Italy	25–26 March
2	12 Hours of Spa-Francorchamps	Circuit de Spa-Francorchamps, Stavelot, Belgium	6–7 May
3	12 Hours of Monza	Autodromo Nazionale di Monza, Monza, Italy	10–11 June
4	6 Hours Qualifying of Estoril	Circuito do Estoril, Estoril, Portugal	7–8 July
4	12 Hours of Estoril	Circuito do Estoril, Estoril, Portugal	7–8 July
5	24 Hours of Barcelona	Circuit de Barcelona-Catalunya, Montmeló, Spain	15–17 September
Cancelled
Round	Event	Circuit	Original Date
NC	6 Hours of Vila Real	Circuito Internacional de Vila Real, Vila Real, Portugal	14–16 July

== Teams and drivers ==
Team	Car	Engine	No.	Drivers	Class	Rounds
GT3
(Germany) Scherer Sport PHX	Audi R8 LMS Evo II	Audi 5.2 L V10	1	(Austria) Michael Doppelmayr	PA	2–5
(Germany) Scherer Sport PHX	Audi R8 LMS Evo II	Audi 5.2 L V10	1	(Germany) Elia Erhart	PA	2–5
(Germany) Scherer Sport PHX	Audi R8 LMS Evo II	Audi 5.2 L V10	1	(Germany) Pierre Kaffer	PA	2–5
(Germany) Scherer Sport PHX	Audi R8 LMS Evo II	Audi 5.2 L V10	1	(Germany) Swen Herberger	PA	2, 5
(Germany) Scherer Sport PHX	Audi R8 LMS Evo II	Audi 5.2 L V10	1	(Germany) Christer Jöns	PA	4–5
(Switzerland) Kessel Racing	Ferrari 488 GT3 Evo 2020 1 Ferrari 296 GT3 2	Ferrari 3.9 L Twin-Turbo V8 1 Ferrari 3.0 L Turbo V6 2	8	(Italy) Alessandro Cutrera	P	1, 3–4
(Switzerland) Kessel Racing	Ferrari 488 GT3 Evo 2020 1 Ferrari 296 GT3 2	Ferrari 3.9 L Twin-Turbo V8 1 Ferrari 3.0 L Turbo V6 2	8	(Italy) Leonardo-Maria del Vecchio	P	1, 3–4
(Switzerland) Kessel Racing	Ferrari 488 GT3 Evo 2020 1 Ferrari 296 GT3 2	Ferrari 3.9 L Twin-Turbo V8 1 Ferrari 3.0 L Turbo V6 2	8	(Italy) Marco Frezza	P	1, 3–4
(Switzerland) Kessel Racing	Ferrari 488 GT3 Evo 2020 1 Ferrari 296 GT3 2	Ferrari 3.9 L Twin-Turbo V8 1 Ferrari 3.0 L Turbo V6 2	8	(Italy) David Fumanelli	P	1, 3–4
(Switzerland) Kessel Racing	Ferrari 488 GT3 Evo 2020 1 Ferrari 296 GT3 2	Ferrari 3.9 L Twin-Turbo V8 1 Ferrari 3.0 L Turbo V6 2	8	(Italy) Marco Talarico	P	1, 3–4
(Germany) Leipert Motorsport	Lamborghini Huracán GT3 Evo	Lamborghini 5.2 L V10	10	(United States) Jean-Francois Brunot	Am	2
(Germany) Leipert Motorsport	Lamborghini Huracán GT3 Evo	Lamborghini 5.2 L V10	10	(New Zealand) Brendon Leitch	Am	2
(Germany) Leipert Motorsport	Lamborghini Huracán GT3 Evo	Lamborghini 5.2 L V10	10	(China) Kerong Li	Am	2
(Switzerland) Hofor Racing	Mercedes-AMG GT3	Mercedes-AMG M159 6.2 L V8	11	(Switzerland) Michael Kroll	Am	1–2, 5
(Switzerland) Hofor Racing	Mercedes-AMG GT3	Mercedes-AMG M159 6.2 L V8	11	(Switzerland) Chantal Prinz	Am	1–2, 5
(Switzerland) Hofor Racing	Mercedes-AMG GT3	Mercedes-AMG M159 6.2 L V8	11	(Germany) Alexander Prinz	Am	1–2, 5
(Switzerland) Hofor Racing	Mercedes-AMG GT3	Mercedes-AMG M159 6.2 L V8	11	(Germany) Carsten Tilke	Am	1, 5
(Switzerland) Hofor Racing	Mercedes-AMG GT3	Mercedes-AMG M159 6.2 L V8	11	(Germany) Max Partl	Am	2
(Switzerland) Hofor Racing	Mercedes-AMG GT3	Mercedes-AMG M159 6.2 L V8	11	(Germany) Manuel Rubow	Am	5
(Italy) BMW Italia Ceccato Racing	BMW M4 GT3	BMW S58B30T0 3.0 L Turbo I6	15	(Brazil) Átila Abreu	Am	3
(Italy) BMW Italia Ceccato Racing	BMW M4 GT3	BMW S58B30T0 3.0 L Turbo I6	15	(Brazil) Leonardo Sanchez	Am	3
(Italy) BMW Italia Ceccato Racing	BMW M4 GT3	BMW S58B30T0 3.0 L Turbo I6	15	(Brazil) William Freire	Am	3
(Hong Kong) Modena Motorsports	Porsche 911 GT3 R (992)	Porsche 4.2 L Flat-6	16	(Switzerland) Mathias Beche	PA	2
(Hong Kong) Modena Motorsports	Porsche 911 GT3 R (992)	Porsche 4.2 L Flat-6	16	(Canada) John Shen	PA	2
(Hong Kong) Modena Motorsports	Porsche 911 GT3 R (992)	Porsche 4.2 L Flat-6	16	(Denmark) Benny Simonsen	PA	2
(Hong Kong) Modena Motorsports	Porsche 911 GT3 R (992)	Porsche 4.2 L Flat-6	16	(Netherlands) Francis Tjia	PA	2
(Antigua and Barbuda) HAAS RT	Audi R8 LMS Evo II	Audi 5.2 L V10	21	(Belgium) Mathieu Detry	P 4 PA 1	All
(Antigua and Barbuda) HAAS RT	Audi R8 LMS Evo II	Audi 5.2 L V10	21	(Belgium) Frédéric Vervisch	P 4 PA 1	1,2, 4
(Antigua and Barbuda) HAAS RT	Audi R8 LMS Evo II	Audi 5.2 L V10	21	(France) Stéphane Perrin	P 4 PA 1	1–2
(Antigua and Barbuda) HAAS RT	Audi R8 LMS Evo II	Audi 5.2 L V10	21	(Belgium) Olivier Bertels	P 4 PA 1	2
(Antigua and Barbuda) HAAS RT	Audi R8 LMS Evo II	Audi 5.2 L V10	21	(Austria) Max Hofer	P 4 PA 1	3, 5
(Antigua and Barbuda) HAAS RT	Audi R8 LMS Evo II	Audi 5.2 L V10	21	(Finland) Miika Panu	P 4 PA 1	3, 5
(Antigua and Barbuda) HAAS RT	Audi R8 LMS Evo II	Audi 5.2 L V10	21	(Belgium) Gregory Servais	P 4 PA 1	4
(Antigua and Barbuda) HAAS RT	Audi R8 LMS Evo II	Audi 5.2 L V10	21	(Belgium) Kris Cools	P 4 PA 1	5
(Antigua and Barbuda) HAAS RT	Audi R8 LMS Evo II	Audi 5.2 L V10	21	(United Kingdom) Gavin Pickering	P 4 PA 1	5
(Germany) WTM by Rinaldi Racing	Ferrari 296 GT3	Ferrari 3.0 L Turbo V6	22	(Germany) Daniel Keilwitz	Am	4–5
(Germany) WTM by Rinaldi Racing	Ferrari 296 GT3	Ferrari 3.0 L Turbo V6	22	(Germany) Torsten Kratz	Am	4–5
(Germany) WTM by Rinaldi Racing	Ferrari 296 GT3	Ferrari 3.0 L Turbo V6	22	(Germany) Jochen Krumbach	Am	4–5
(Germany) WTM by Rinaldi Racing	Ferrari 296 GT3	Ferrari 3.0 L Turbo V6	22	(Germany) Georg Weiss	Am	4–5
(Germany) WTM by Rinaldi Racing	Ferrari 296 GT3	Ferrari 3.0 L Turbo V6	22	(Germany) Leonard Weiss	Am	4–5
(Germany) WTM by Rinaldi Racing	Ferrari 296 GT3	Ferrari 3.0 L Turbo V6	22	(Spain) Isaac Tutumlu	Am	5
(Germany) Car Collection Motorsport	Porsche 911 GT3 R (992)	Porsche 4.2 L Flat-6	23	(Switzerland) Alex Fontana	PA	5
(Germany) Car Collection Motorsport	Porsche 911 GT3 R (992)	Porsche 4.2 L Flat-6	23	(Switzerland) Ivan Jacoma	PA	5
(Germany) Car Collection Motorsport	Porsche 911 GT3 R (992)	Porsche 4.2 L Flat-6	23	(Switzerland) Yannick Mettler	PA	5
(Germany) Car Collection Motorsport	Porsche 911 GT3 R (992)	Porsche 4.2 L Flat-6	23	(United States) Hash Patel	PA	5
(France) Saintéloc Junior Team	Audi R8 LMS Evo II	Audi 5.2 L V10	26	(France) Erwan Bastard	P	1–2
(France) Saintéloc Junior Team	Audi R8 LMS Evo II	Audi 5.2 L V10	26	(France) Paul Evrard	P	1–2
(France) Saintéloc Junior Team	Audi R8 LMS Evo II	Audi 5.2 L V10	26	(France) Antoine Doquin	P	2
(United States) Heart of Racing by SPS	Mercedes-AMG GT3 Evo	Mercedes-AMG M159 6.2 L V8	27	(Canada) Roman De Angelis	Am	1–2
(United States) Heart of Racing by SPS	Mercedes-AMG GT3 Evo	Mercedes-AMG M159 6.2 L V8	27	(United Kingdom) Ian James	Am	1–2
(United States) Heart of Racing by SPS	Mercedes-AMG GT3 Evo	Mercedes-AMG M159 6.2 L V8	27	(United States) Gray Newell	Am	1–2
(Germany) Land Motorsport	Audi R8 LMS Evo II	Audi 5.2 L V10	34	(Germany) Johannes Dr. Kirchhoff	Am	1–3, 5
(Germany) Land Motorsport	Audi R8 LMS Evo II	Audi 5.2 L V10	34	(Germany) Tim Vogler	Am	1–2, 5
(Germany) Land Motorsport	Audi R8 LMS Evo II	Audi 5.2 L V10	34	(Germany) Ingo Vogler	Am	1, 5
(Germany) Land Motorsport	Audi R8 LMS Evo II	Audi 5.2 L V10	34	(Germany) Max Edelhoff	Am	2–3, 5
(Germany) Land Motorsport	Audi R8 LMS Evo II	Audi 5.2 L V10	34	(Germany) Elmar Grimm	Am	3
(Germany) Land Motorsport	Audi R8 LMS Evo II	Audi 5.2 L V10	34	(Norway) Wiggo Dalmo	Am	5
(Germany) Land Motorsport	Audi R8 LMS Evo II	Audi 5.2 L V10	55	(Germany) Christopher Mies	PA	1–2
(Germany) Land Motorsport	Audi R8 LMS Evo II	Audi 5.2 L V10	55	(Germany) Tim Müller	PA	1–2
(Germany) Land Motorsport	Audi R8 LMS Evo II	Audi 5.2 L V10	55	(Germany) Stefan Wieninger	PA	1–2
(Italy) MP Racing	Mercedes-AMG GT3 Evo	Mercedes-AMG M159 6.2 L V8	58	(Italy) Corinna Gostner	Am	2, 4
(Italy) MP Racing	Mercedes-AMG GT3 Evo	Mercedes-AMG M159 6.2 L V8	58	(Italy) Manuela Gostner	Am	2, 4
(Italy) MP Racing	Mercedes-AMG GT3 Evo	Mercedes-AMG M159 6.2 L V8	58	(Italy) Thomas Gostner	Am	2, 4
(Italy) MP Racing	Mercedes-AMG GT3 Evo	Mercedes-AMG M159 6.2 L V8	58	(Italy) David Gostner	Am	2
(Italy) MP Racing	Mercedes-AMG GT3 Evo	Mercedes-AMG M159 6.2 L V8	58	(Italy) Fabrizio Crestani	Am	4
(Luxembourg) JP Motorsport	McLaren 720S GT3 Evo	McLaren M840T 4.0 L Turbo V8	69	(Austria) Christian Klien	P	2
(Luxembourg) JP Motorsport	McLaren 720S GT3 Evo	McLaren M840T 4.0 L Turbo V8	69	(Poland) Patryk Krupiński	P	2
(Luxembourg) JP Motorsport	McLaren 720S GT3 Evo	McLaren M840T 4.0 L Turbo V8	69	(Austria) Norbert Siedler	P	2
(Lithuania) Juta Racing	Audi R8 LMS Evo II	Audi 5.2 L V10	71	(Lithuania) Arunas Geciauskas	Am 2 PA1	1–2, 5
(Lithuania) Juta Racing	Audi R8 LMS Evo II	Audi 5.2 L V10	71	(Lithuania) Jonas Gelžinis	Am 2 PA1	1–2, 5
(Lithuania) Juta Racing	Audi R8 LMS Evo II	Audi 5.2 L V10	71	(Ukraine) Evgeny Sokolovsky	Am 2 PA1	1–2, 5
(Lithuania) Juta Racing	Audi R8 LMS Evo II	Audi 5.2 L V10	71	(Lithuania) Vytenis Gulbinas	Am 2 PA1	1–2
(Lithuania) Juta Racing	Audi R8 LMS Evo II	Audi 5.2 L V10	71	(Lithuania) Jonas Karklys	Am 2 PA1	5
(Lithuania) Juta Racing	Audi R8 LMS Evo II	Audi 5.2 L V10	71	(Netherlands) Bas Schouten	Am 2 PA1	5
(Lithuania) Juta Racing	Audi R8 LMS Evo 2 Audi R8 LMS Evo II 1	Audi 5.2 L V10	72	(Lithuania) Aurimas Jablonskis	Am	1–2, 5
(Lithuania) Juta Racing	Audi R8 LMS Evo 2 Audi R8 LMS Evo II 1	Audi 5.2 L V10	72	(Lithuania) Egidijus Gelūnas	Am	1–2
(Lithuania) Juta Racing	Audi R8 LMS Evo 2 Audi R8 LMS Evo II 1	Audi 5.2 L V10	72	(Lithuania) Audrius Navickas	Am	1, 5
(Lithuania) Juta Racing	Audi R8 LMS Evo 2 Audi R8 LMS Evo II 1	Audi 5.2 L V10	72	(Lithuania) Oskaras Brazaitis	Am	1
(Lithuania) Juta Racing	Audi R8 LMS Evo 2 Audi R8 LMS Evo II 1	Audi 5.2 L V10	72	(Lithuania) Jonas Karklys	Am	2
(Lithuania) Juta Racing	Audi R8 LMS Evo 2 Audi R8 LMS Evo II 1	Audi 5.2 L V10	72	(Lithuania) Joana Survilaité	Am	2
(Lithuania) Juta Racing	Audi R8 LMS Evo 2 Audi R8 LMS Evo II 1	Audi 5.2 L V10	72	(Lithuania) Leonardas Dirzys	Am	5
(Lithuania) Juta Racing	Audi R8 LMS Evo 2 Audi R8 LMS Evo II 1	Audi 5.2 L V10	72	(Lithuania) Algirdas Gelžinis	Am	5
(Lithuania) Juta Racing	Audi R8 LMS Evo 2 Audi R8 LMS Evo II 1	Audi 5.2 L V10	72	(Lithuania) Vytenis Gulbinas	Am	5
(France) IMSA LS Group Performance	Porsche 911 GT3 R (992)	Porsche 4.2 L Flat-6	76	(France) Julien Andlauer	P	5
(France) IMSA LS Group Performance	Porsche 911 GT3 R (992)	Porsche 4.2 L Flat-6	76	(France) Grégory Guilvert	P	5
(France) IMSA LS Group Performance	Porsche 911 GT3 R (992)	Porsche 4.2 L Flat-6	76	(France) Laurent Hurgon	P	5
(France) IMSA LS Group Performance	Porsche 911 GT3 R (992)	Porsche 4.2 L Flat-6	76	(France) Simon Tirman	P	5
(United States) CP Racing	Mercedes-AMG GT3 Evo	Mercedes-AMG M159 6.2 L V8	85	(United States) Charles Espenlaub	Am	All
(United States) CP Racing	Mercedes-AMG GT3 Evo	Mercedes-AMG M159 6.2 L V8	85	(United States) Shane Lewis	Am	All
(United States) CP Racing	Mercedes-AMG GT3 Evo	Mercedes-AMG M159 6.2 L V8	85	(United States) Charles Putman	Am	All
(United States) CP Racing	Mercedes-AMG GT3 Evo	Mercedes-AMG M159 6.2 L V8	85	(United States) Joe Foster	Am	3–5
(United States) CP Racing	Mercedes-AMG GT3 Evo	Mercedes-AMG M159 6.2 L V8	85	(United Kingdom) Phil Quaife	Am	5
(France) AKKodis ASP Team	Mercedes-AMG GT3 Evo	Mercedes-AMG M159 6.2 L V8	88	(France) Jean-Luc Beaubelique	Am	1
(France) AKKodis ASP Team	Mercedes-AMG GT3 Evo	Mercedes-AMG M159 6.2 L V8	88	(France) Jérôme Policand	Am	1
(France) AKKodis ASP Team	Mercedes-AMG GT3 Evo	Mercedes-AMG M159 6.2 L V8	88	(France) Benjamin Ricci	Am	1
(France) AKKodis ASP Team	Mercedes-AMG GT3 Evo	Mercedes-AMG M159 6.2 L V8	88	(France) Mauro Ricci	Am	1
(Spain) E2P Racing	Porsche 911 GT3 R (991.2)	Porsche 4.0 L Flat-6	90	(Spain) Pablo Burguera	Am	All
(Spain) E2P Racing	Porsche 911 GT3 R (991.2)	Porsche 4.0 L Flat-6	90	(Spain) Javier Morcillo	Am	All
(Spain) E2P Racing	Porsche 911 GT3 R (991.2)	Porsche 4.0 L Flat-6	90	(Spain) Antonio Sainero	Am	All
(Germany) Herberth Motorsport	Porsche 911 GT3 R (991.2) 2 Porsche 911 GT3 R (992) 2	Porsche 4.0 L Flat-6 2 Porsche 4.2 L Flat-6 2	91	(Switzerland) Daniel Allemann	PA 3 P 1	1–3, 5
(Germany) Herberth Motorsport	Porsche 911 GT3 R (991.2) 2 Porsche 911 GT3 R (992) 2	Porsche 4.0 L Flat-6 2 Porsche 4.2 L Flat-6 2	91	(Germany) Ralf Bohn	PA 3 P 1	1–3, 5
(Germany) Herberth Motorsport	Porsche 911 GT3 R (991.2) 2 Porsche 911 GT3 R (992) 2	Porsche 4.0 L Flat-6 2 Porsche 4.2 L Flat-6 2	91	(Germany) Alfred Renauer	PA 3 P 1	1–3, 5
(Germany) Herberth Motorsport	Porsche 911 GT3 R (991.2) 2 Porsche 911 GT3 R (992) 2	Porsche 4.0 L Flat-6 2 Porsche 4.2 L Flat-6 2	91	(Germany) Robert Renauer	PA 3 P 1	1–3, 5
(Germany) Herberth Motorsport	Porsche 911 GT3 R (991.2) 2 Porsche 911 GT3 R (992) 2	Porsche 4.0 L Flat-6 2 Porsche 4.2 L Flat-6 2	91	(Germany) Laurin Heinrich	PA 3 P 1	2
(Germany) Herberth Motorsport	Porsche 911 GT3 R (991.2) 2 Porsche 911 GT3 R (992) 2	Porsche 4.0 L Flat-6 2 Porsche 4.2 L Flat-6 2	91	(Germany) Patrick Kolb	PA 3 P 1	5
GTX
(France) Vortex V8	Vortex 1.0	Chevrolet 6.2 L V8	701	(France) Lionel Amrouche	All	
(France) Vortex V8	Vortex 1.0	Chevrolet 6.2 L V8	701	(France) Philippe Bonnel	1, 3–5	
(France) Vortex V8	Vortex 1.0	Chevrolet 6.2 L V8	701	(France) Philippe Gruau	1	
(France) Vortex V8	Vortex 1.0	Chevrolet 6.2 L V8	701	(France) Olivier Gomez	2	
(France) Vortex V8	Vortex 1.0	Chevrolet 6.2 L V8	701	(France) Gilles Courtois	3–4	
(France) Vortex V8	Vortex 1.0	Chevrolet 6.2 L V8	701	(France) Miguel Moiola	5	
(France) Vortex V8	Vortex 1.0	Chevrolet 6.2 L V8	701	(France) Lucas Sugliano	5	
(France) Vortex V8	Vortex 1.0	Chevrolet 6.2 L V8	702	(France) Lucas Sugliano	1–2	
(France) Vortex V8	Vortex 1.0	Chevrolet 6.2 L V8	702	(Switzerland) Laurent Misbach	1–2	
(France) Vortex V8	Vortex 1.0	Chevrolet 6.2 L V8	702	(France) Pierre Fontaine	1	
(France) Vortex V8	Vortex 1.0	Chevrolet 6.2 L V8	702	(France) Philippe Gruau	2, 5	
(France) Vortex V8	Vortex 1.0	Chevrolet 6.2 L V8	702	(France) Solenn Amrouche	5	
(France) Vortex V8	Vortex 1.0	Chevrolet 6.2 L V8	702	(France) Julien Boillot	5	
(France) Vortex V8	Vortex 1.0	Chevrolet 6.2 L V8	702	(France) Stéphane Cottrell	5	
(Spain) Escuderia Faraon	Porsche 991 GT3 Cup I	Porsche 4.0 L Flat-6	709	(Spain) Pablo Bras Silvero	5	
(Spain) Escuderia Faraon	Porsche 991 GT3 Cup I	Porsche 4.0 L Flat-6	709	(Spain) Fernando Gonzalez	5	
(Spain) Escuderia Faraon	Porsche 991 GT3 Cup I	Porsche 4.0 L Flat-6	709	(Spain) Francesc Gutierrez Agüi	5	
(Spain) Escuderia Faraon	Porsche 991 GT3 Cup I	Porsche 4.0 L Flat-6	709	(Spain) Pedro Miguel Lourinho Bras	5	
(Spain) Escuderia Faraon	Porsche 991 GT3 Cup I	Porsche 4.0 L Flat-6	709	(Spain) Agustin Sanabria Crespo	5	
(Austria) Razoon - More than Racing	KTM X-Bow GT2	Audi 2.5 L I5	714	(Poland) Arthur Chwist	5	
(Austria) Razoon - More than Racing	KTM X-Bow GT2	Audi 2.5 L I5	714	(Austria) Daniel Drexel	5	
(Austria) Razoon - More than Racing	KTM X-Bow GT2	Audi 2.5 L I5	714	(Austria) Christian Loimayr	5	
(Austria) Razoon - More than Racing	KTM X-Bow GT2	Audi 2.5 L I5	714	(Austria) Dominik Olbert	5	
(Spain) NM Racing Team	Mercedes-AMG GT2	Mercedes-AMG 4.0 L V8	715	(Spain) Manel Lao Cornago	5	
(Spain) NM Racing Team	Mercedes-AMG GT2	Mercedes-AMG 4.0 L V8	715	Vyacheslav Gutak (Note: Gutak is Russian, but he competes as a neutral competitor as Russian national emblems were banned by the FIA due to the Russian invasion of Ukraine.)	5	
(Spain) NM Racing Team	Mercedes-AMG GT2	Mercedes-AMG 4.0 L V8	715	(Spain) Lluc Ibáñez	5	
(Spain) NM Racing Team	Mercedes-AMG GT2	Mercedes-AMG 4.0 L V8	715	(France) Stéphane Perrin	5	
(Spain) NM Racing Team	Mercedes-AMG GT2	Mercedes-AMG 4.0 L V8	715	(Germany) Jörg Viebahn	5	
(Germany) 9und11 Racing	Porsche 991 GT3 Cup II MR	Porsche 4.0 L Flat-6	719	(Germany) Georg Goder	1–3	
(Germany) 9und11 Racing	Porsche 991 GT3 Cup II MR	Porsche 4.0 L Flat-6	719	(Germany) Ralf Oehme	1–3	
(Germany) 9und11 Racing	Porsche 991 GT3 Cup II MR	Porsche 4.0 L Flat-6	719	(Germany) Martin Schlüter	1–3	
(Germany) 9und11 Racing	Porsche 991 GT3 Cup II MR	Porsche 4.0 L Flat-6	719	(Germany) Leonard Oehme	1, 3	
(Germany) 9und11 Racing	Porsche 991 GT3 Cup II MR	Porsche 4.0 L Flat-6	719	(Germany) Tim Scheerbarth	2	
(Lithuania) RD Signs – Siauliai Racing Team	Lamborghini Huracán Super Trofeo Evo 2	Lamborghini 5.2 L V10	720	(Lithuania) Audrius Butkevicius	All	
(Lithuania) RD Signs – Siauliai Racing Team	Lamborghini Huracán Super Trofeo Evo 2	Lamborghini 5.2 L V10	720	(Italy) Nicola Michelon	All	
(Lithuania) RD Signs – Siauliai Racing Team	Lamborghini Huracán Super Trofeo Evo 2	Lamborghini 5.2 L V10	720	(Lithuania) Paulius Paskevicius	All	
(Lithuania) RD Signs – Siauliai Racing Team	Lamborghini Huracán Super Trofeo Evo 2	Lamborghini 5.2 L V10	720	(Lithuania) Jocius Deividas	5	
(Italy) Lotus PB Racing	Lotus Exige V6 Cup R	Toyota 3.5 L V6	726	(Italy) Stefano D'Aste	1–2	
(Italy) Lotus PB Racing	Lotus Exige V6 Cup R	Toyota 3.5 L V6	726	(Monaco) Vito Utzieri	1–2	
(Italy) Lotus PB Racing	Lotus Exige V6 Cup R	Toyota 3.5 L V6	726	(Monaco) Luca Littardi	1	
(Italy) Lotus PB Racing	Lotus Exige V6 Cup R	Toyota 3.5 L V6	726	(Italy) Costantino Peroni	1	
(Italy) Lotus PB Racing	Lotus Exige V6 Cup R	Toyota 3.5 L V6	726	(Italy) Pietro Vergnano	1	
(Italy) Lotus PB Racing	Lotus Exige V6 Cup R	Toyota 3.5 L V6	726	(Italy) Maurizio Copetti	2	
(Italy) Lotus PB Racing	Lotus Exige V6 Cup R	Toyota 3.5 L V6	726	(Italy) Federico Leo	2	
(Germany) Land Motorsport	Audi TT RS	Audi 2.5 L I5	755	(Germany) Ben Koslowski	2	
(Germany) Land Motorsport	Audi TT RS	Audi 2.5 L I5	755	(Germany) Christopher Tiger	2	
(Belgium) VDS Racing Adventures	MARC II V8	Ford Modular 5.2 L V8	758	(Belgium) Raphaël van der Straten	2, 5	
(Belgium) VDS Racing Adventures	MARC II V8	Ford Modular 5.2 L V8	758	(Belgium) Nathan Vanspringel	2, 5	
(Belgium) VDS Racing Adventures	MARC II V8	Ford Modular 5.2 L V8	758	(Belgium) Nick Geelen	2	
(Belgium) VDS Racing Adventures	MARC II V8	Ford Modular 5.2 L V8	758	(Belgium) José Close	5	
(Belgium) VDS Racing Adventures	MARC II V8	Ford Modular 5.2 L V8	758	(Belgium) Olivier Hermans	5	
GT3 Poland	Lamborghini Huracán Super Trofeo Evo 2	Lamborghini 5.2 L V10	763	(Poland) Adrian Lewandowski	2	
GT3 Poland	Lamborghini Huracán Super Trofeo Evo 2	Lamborghini 5.2 L V10	763	(Poland) Andrzej Lewandowski	2	
GT3 Poland	Lamborghini Huracán Super Trofeo Evo 2	Lamborghini 5.2 L V10	763	(Poland) Mariusz Miękoś	2	
992
(Belgium) Red Ant Racing	Porsche 992 GT3 Cup	Porsche 4.0 L Flat-6	903	(Belgium) Yannick Redant	P	All
(Belgium) Red Ant Racing	Porsche 992 GT3 Cup	Porsche 4.0 L Flat-6	903	(Belgium) Kobe de Breucker	P	1–2, 4–5
(Belgium) Red Ant Racing	Porsche 992 GT3 Cup	Porsche 4.0 L Flat-6	903	(Belgium) Ayrton Redant	P	1–2, 4–5
(Belgium) Red Ant Racing	Porsche 992 GT3 Cup	Porsche 4.0 L Flat-6	903	(South Africa) Arnold Neveling	P	3
(Belgium) Red Ant Racing	Porsche 992 GT3 Cup	Porsche 4.0 L Flat-6	903	(Belgium) Kai Rillaerts	P	3
(Belgium) Red Ant Racing	Porsche 992 GT3 Cup	Porsche 4.0 L Flat-6	903	(Netherlands) Huub van Eijndhoven	P	5
(Belgium) Red Ant Racing	Porsche 992 GT3 Cup	Porsche 4.0 L Flat-6	904	(Belgium) Dirk van Rompuy	Am 2 P 2	1
(Belgium) Red Ant Racing	Porsche 992 GT3 Cup	Porsche 4.0 L Flat-6	904	(Belgium) Tom van Rompuy	Am 2 P 2	1
(Belgium) Red Ant Racing	Porsche 992 GT3 Cup	Porsche 4.0 L Flat-6	904	(Belgium) Steve van Bellingen	Am 2 P 2	1
(Belgium) Red Ant Racing	Porsche 992 GT3 Cup	Porsche 4.0 L Flat-6	904	(Belgium) Bert Redant	Am 2 P 2	1
(Belgium) Red Ant Racing	Porsche 992 GT3 Cup	Porsche 4.0 L Flat-6	904	(Belgium) John de Wilde	Am 2 P 2	2
(Belgium) Red Ant Racing	Porsche 992 GT3 Cup	Porsche 4.0 L Flat-6	904	(Belgium) Sam Dejonghe	Am 2 P 2	2
(Belgium) Red Ant Racing	Porsche 992 GT3 Cup	Porsche 4.0 L Flat-6	904	(Belgium) Philippe Wils	Am 2 P 2	2
(Belgium) Red Ant Racing	Porsche 992 GT3 Cup	Porsche 4.0 L Flat-6	904	(Belgium) Jimmy de Breucker	Am 2 P 2	4–5
(Belgium) Red Ant Racing	Porsche 992 GT3 Cup	Porsche 4.0 L Flat-6	904	(Belgium) Brent Verheyen	Am 2 P 2	4–5
(Belgium) Red Ant Racing	Porsche 992 GT3 Cup	Porsche 4.0 L Flat-6	904	(Belgium) Michiel Haverans	Am 2 P 2	4
(Belgium) Red Ant Racing	Porsche 992 GT3 Cup	Porsche 4.0 L Flat-6	904	(United Kingdom) Charles Dawson	Am 2 P 2	5
(Belgium) Red Ant Racing	Porsche 992 GT3 Cup	Porsche 4.0 L Flat-6	904	(Belgium) Marc Goossens	Am 2 P 2	5
(United Kingdom) Richardson Racing	Porsche 992 GT3 Cup	Porsche 4.0 L Flat-6	906	(Bahrain) Ali Al-Khalifa	P	5
(United Kingdom) Richardson Racing	Porsche 992 GT3 Cup	Porsche 4.0 L Flat-6	906	(United Kingdom) Charlie Hollings	P	5
(United Kingdom) Richardson Racing	Porsche 992 GT3 Cup	Porsche 4.0 L Flat-6	906	(United Kingdom) James Littlejohn	P	5
(United Kingdom) Richardson Racing	Porsche 992 GT3 Cup	Porsche 4.0 L Flat-6	906	(United Kingdom) David Waddington	P	5
(Germany) RPM Racing	Porsche 992 GT3 Cup	Porsche 4.0 L Flat-6	907	(United States) Tracy Krohn	Am	1, 3–5
(Germany) RPM Racing	Porsche 992 GT3 Cup	Porsche 4.0 L Flat-6	907	(Sweden) Niclas Jönsson	Am	1, 3–5
(Germany) RPM Racing	Porsche 992 GT3 Cup	Porsche 4.0 L Flat-6	907	(Germany) Philip Hamprecht	Am	1, 3–5
(Germany) RPM Racing	Porsche 992 GT3 Cup	Porsche 4.0 L Flat-6	907	(Netherlands) Patrick Huisman	Am	5
(France) SebLajoux Racing by DUWO Racing	Porsche 992 GT3 Cup	Porsche 4.0 L Flat-6	910	(France) Laurent Cochard	Am	5
(France) SebLajoux Racing by DUWO Racing	Porsche 992 GT3 Cup	Porsche 4.0 L Flat-6	910	(France) Vicent Isavard	Am	5
(France) SebLajoux Racing by DUWO Racing	Porsche 992 GT3 Cup	Porsche 4.0 L Flat-6	910	(France) Mathys Jaubert	Am	5
(France) SebLajoux Racing by DUWO Racing	Porsche 992 GT3 Cup	Porsche 4.0 L Flat-6	910	(France) Sébastien Lajoux	Am	5
(France) SebLajoux Racing by DUWO Racing	Porsche 992 GT3 Cup	Porsche 4.0 L Flat-6	910	(France) David Sarny	Am	5
(Netherlands) Red Camel-Jordans.nl	Porsche 992 GT3 Cup	Porsche 4.0 L Flat-6	909	(Netherlands) Ivo Breukers	P	All
(Netherlands) Red Camel-Jordans.nl	Porsche 992 GT3 Cup	Porsche 4.0 L Flat-6	909	(Netherlands) Luc Breukers	P	Al
(Netherlands) Red Camel-Jordans.nl	Porsche 992 GT3 Cup	Porsche 4.0 L Flat-6	909	(Netherlands) Rik Breukers	P	All
(Netherlands) Red Camel-Jordans.nl	Porsche 992 GT3 Cup	Porsche 4.0 L Flat-6	909	(Switzerland) Fabian Danz	P	1, 4–5
(Switzerland) Centri Porsche Ticino	Porsche 992 GT3 Cup	Porsche 4.0 L Flat-6	912	(Italy) Max Busnelli	Am	1
(Switzerland) Centri Porsche Ticino	Porsche 992 GT3 Cup	Porsche 4.0 L Flat-6	912	(Italy) Francesco Fenici	Am	1
(Switzerland) Centri Porsche Ticino	Porsche 992 GT3 Cup	Porsche 4.0 L Flat-6	912	(Switzerland) Ivan Jacoma	Am	1
(Switzerland) Centri Porsche Ticino	Porsche 992 GT3 Cup	Porsche 4.0 L Flat-6	912	(Switzerland) Valerio Presezzi	Am	1
(Switzerland) Orchid Racing Team	Porsche 992 GT3 Cup	Porsche 4.0 L Flat-6	917	(Switzerland) Antonio Garzon	Am	5
(Switzerland) Orchid Racing Team	Porsche 992 GT3 Cup	Porsche 4.0 L Flat-6	917	(Switzerland) Laurent Misbach	Am	5
(Switzerland) Orchid Racing Team	Porsche 992 GT3 Cup	Porsche 4.0 L Flat-6	917	(Switzerland) Alexandre Mottet	Am	5
(Switzerland) Orchid Racing Team	Porsche 992 GT3 Cup	Porsche 4.0 L Flat-6	917	(Switzerland) Fabio Spirgi	Am	5
(Germany) Black Falcon Team TEXTAR	Porsche 992 GT3 Cup	Porsche 4.0 L Flat-6	919	(United States) Matt Kehoe	Am	2
(Germany) Black Falcon Team TEXTAR	Porsche 992 GT3 Cup	Porsche 4.0 L Flat-6	919	(Luxembourg) Carlos Rivas	Am	2
(Germany) Black Falcon Team TEXTAR	Porsche 992 GT3 Cup	Porsche 4.0 L Flat-6	919	(United States) Tom Roberts	Am	2
(Germany) Black Falcon Team TEXTAR	Porsche 992 GT3 Cup	Porsche 4.0 L Flat-6	920	(Germany) Alexander Böhm	Am	2
(Germany) Black Falcon Team TEXTAR	Porsche 992 GT3 Cup	Porsche 4.0 L Flat-6	920	(Germany) Axel König	Am	2
(Germany) Black Falcon Team TEXTAR	Porsche 992 GT3 Cup	Porsche 4.0 L Flat-6	920	(Germany) Axel Sartingen	Am	2
(Germany) Black Falcon Team TEXTAR	Porsche 992 GT3 Cup	Porsche 4.0 L Flat-6	920	(Germany) Norbert Schneider	Am	2
(Italy) Enrico Fulgenzi Racing	Porsche 992 GT3 Cup	Porsche 4.0 L Flat-6	923	(Japan) Shintaro Akatsu	P	1
(Italy) Enrico Fulgenzi Racing	Porsche 992 GT3 Cup	Porsche 4.0 L Flat-6	923	(Italy) Enrico Fulgenzi	P	1
(Italy) Enrico Fulgenzi Racing	Porsche 992 GT3 Cup	Porsche 4.0 L Flat-6	923	(Italy) Kikko Galbiat	P	1
(Belgium) PK Carsport	Porsche 992 GT3 Cup	Porsche 4.0 L Flat-6	924	(Belgium) Peter Guelinckx	Am	2
(Belgium) PK Carsport	Porsche 992 GT3 Cup	Porsche 4.0 L Flat-6	924	(Belgium) Bert Longin	Am	2
(Belgium) PK Carsport	Porsche 992 GT3 Cup	Porsche 4.0 L Flat-6	924	(Belgium) Stienes Longin	Am	2
(Germany) NKPP by HRT Performance	Porsche 992 GT3 Cup	Porsche 4.0 L Flat-6	928	(Netherlands) Gjis Bessem	Am	1, 5
(Germany) NKPP by HRT Performance	Porsche 992 GT3 Cup	Porsche 4.0 L Flat-6	928	(Netherlands) Harry Hilders	Am	1, 5
(Germany) NKPP by HRT Performance	Porsche 992 GT3 Cup	Porsche 4.0 L Flat-6	928	(Netherlands) Bob Herber	Am	5
(Germany) NKPP by HRT Performance	Porsche 992 GT3 Cup	Porsche 4.0 L Flat-6	928	(Netherlands) Mark van der Aa	Am	5
(Germany) HRT Performance	Porsche 992 GT3 Cup	Porsche 4.0 L Flat-6	929	(United States) Gregg Gorski	Am 1 P 1	2
(Germany) HRT Performance	Porsche 992 GT3 Cup	Porsche 4.0 L Flat-6	929	(Finland) Kari-Pekka Laaksonen	Am 1 P 1	2
(Germany) HRT Performance	Porsche 992 GT3 Cup	Porsche 4.0 L Flat-6	929	(Finland) Miika Panu	Am 1 P 1	2
(Germany) HRT Performance	Porsche 992 GT3 Cup	Porsche 4.0 L Flat-6	929	(Germany) Julian Hanses	Am 1 P 1	5
(Germany) HRT Performance	Porsche 992 GT3 Cup	Porsche 4.0 L Flat-6	929	(United Kingdom) Harley Haughton	Am 1 P 1	5
(Germany) HRT Performance	Porsche 992 GT3 Cup	Porsche 4.0 L Flat-6	929	(New Zealand) Anthony Leighs	Am 1 P 1	5
(Germany) HRT Performance	Porsche 992 GT3 Cup	Porsche 4.0 L Flat-6	929	(South Africa) Mikaeel Pitamber	Am 1 P 1	5
(Germany) HRT Performance	Porsche 992 GT3 Cup	Porsche 4.0 L Flat-6	930	(Netherlands) Bob Herber	Am 1 P 4	1
(Germany) HRT Performance	Porsche 992 GT3 Cup	Porsche 4.0 L Flat-6	930	(Netherlands) Marcel van Berlo	Am 1 P 4	1
(Germany) HRT Performance	Porsche 992 GT3 Cup	Porsche 4.0 L Flat-6	930	(United Kingdom) Adam Christodoulou	Am 1 P 4	2–3
(Germany) HRT Performance	Porsche 992 GT3 Cup	Porsche 4.0 L Flat-6	930	(China) Xinzhe Xie	Am 1 P 4	2–3
(Germany) HRT Performance	Porsche 992 GT3 Cup	Porsche 4.0 L Flat-6	930	(China) Eric Zang	Am 1 P 4	2–3
(Germany) HRT Performance	Porsche 992 GT3 Cup	Porsche 4.0 L Flat-6	930	(China) Luo Kai Luo	Am 1 P 4	3
(Germany) HRT Performance	Porsche 992 GT3 Cup	Porsche 4.0 L Flat-6	930	(Finland) Antti Buri	Am 1 P 4	4
(Germany) HRT Performance	Porsche 992 GT3 Cup	Porsche 4.0 L Flat-6	930	(Italy) Daniele di Amato	Am 1 P 4	4
(Germany) HRT Performance	Porsche 992 GT3 Cup	Porsche 4.0 L Flat-6	930	(Finland) Kari-Pekka Laaksonen	Am 1 P 4	4
(Germany) HRT Performance	Porsche 992 GT3 Cup	Porsche 4.0 L Flat-6	930	(Germany) Axel Sartingen	Am 1 P 4	4
(Germany) HRT Performance	Porsche 992 GT3 Cup	Porsche 4.0 L Flat-6	930	(Sweden) Gustaf Bergström	Am 1 P 4	5
(Germany) HRT Performance	Porsche 992 GT3 Cup	Porsche 4.0 L Flat-6	930	(Sweden) Hampus Ericsson	Am 1 P 4	5
(Germany) HRT Performance	Porsche 992 GT3 Cup	Porsche 4.0 L Flat-6	930	(Sweden) Lukas Sundahl	Am 1 P 4	5
(Germany) HRT Performance	Porsche 992 GT3 Cup	Porsche 4.0 L Flat-6	930	(Sweden) Edward Sandström	Am 1 P 4	5
(Germany) HRT Performance	Porsche 992 GT3 Cup	Porsche 4.0 L Flat-6	967	(Switzerland) Stefano Monaco	P 1 Am 4	All
(Germany) HRT Performance	Porsche 992 GT3 Cup	Porsche 4.0 L Flat-6	967	(Italy) Amedeo Pampanini	P 1 Am 4	All
(Germany) HRT Performance	Porsche 992 GT3 Cup	Porsche 4.0 L Flat-6	967	(Switzerland) Nicolas Stürzinger	P 1 Am 4	All
(Germany) HRT Performance	Porsche 992 GT3 Cup	Porsche 4.0 L Flat-6	967	(Italy) Roberto Pampanini	P 1 Am 4	1–2, 4–5
(United Arab Emirates) Rabdan Motorsport by HRT Performance	Porsche 992 GT3 Cup	Porsche 4.0 L Flat-6	977	(United Arab Emirates) Saif Alameri	P	3
(United Arab Emirates) Rabdan Motorsport by HRT Performance	Porsche 992 GT3 Cup	Porsche 4.0 L Flat-6	977	(New Zealand) Anthony Leighs	P	3
(United Arab Emirates) Rabdan Motorsport by HRT Performance	Porsche 992 GT3 Cup	Porsche 4.0 L Flat-6	977	(Austria) Christopher Zöchling	P	3
(Belgium) Q1 Trackracing	Porsche 992 GT3 Cup	Porsche 4.0 L Flat-6	950	(Brazil) Rubens Barrichello	P	3
(Belgium) Q1 Trackracing	Porsche 992 GT3 Cup	Porsche 4.0 L Flat-6	950	(Brazil) Eduardo Menossi	P	3
(Belgium) Q1 Trackracing	Porsche 992 GT3 Cup	Porsche 4.0 L Flat-6	950	(Brazil) Vina Neves	P	3
(Romania) Willi Motorsport by Ebimotors	Porsche 992 GT3 Cup	Porsche 4.0 L Flat-6	955	(Italy) Sabino de Castro	P	All
(Romania) Willi Motorsport by Ebimotors	Porsche 992 GT3 Cup	Porsche 4.0 L Flat-6	955	(Romania) Sergiu Nicolae	P	All
(Romania) Willi Motorsport by Ebimotors	Porsche 992 GT3 Cup	Porsche 4.0 L Flat-6	955	(Italy) Fabrizio Broggi	P	1–3
(Romania) Willi Motorsport by Ebimotors	Porsche 992 GT3 Cup	Porsche 4.0 L Flat-6	955	(Italy) Papi Cosimo	P	4–5
(Italy) Ebimotors	Porsche 992 GT3 Cup	Porsche 4.0 L Flat-6	973	(Italy) Gianluca Giorgi	Am	1
(Italy) Ebimotors	Porsche 992 GT3 Cup	Porsche 4.0 L Flat-6	973	(Italy) Paolo Gnemmi	Am	1
(Italy) Ebimotors	Porsche 992 GT3 Cup	Porsche 4.0 L Flat-6	973	(Italy) Gianluigi Piccioli	Am	1
(Italy) Ebimotors	Porsche 992 GT3 Cup	Porsche 4.0 L Flat-6	973	(Italy) Paolo Venerosi	Am	1
(Belgium) Speed Lover	Porsche 992 GT3 Cup	Porsche 4.0 L Flat-6	979	(Belgium) Olivier Dons	Am	2
(Belgium) Speed Lover	Porsche 992 GT3 Cup	Porsche 4.0 L Flat-6	979	(Belgium) Rodrigue Gillion	Am	2
(Belgium) Speed Lover	Porsche 992 GT3 Cup	Porsche 4.0 L Flat-6	979	(Belgium) Kurt Hansen	Am	2
(Belgium) Speed Lover	Porsche 992 GT3 Cup	Porsche 4.0 L Flat-6	979	(Belgium) Nico Verdonck	Am	2
(Estonia) EST1 Racing	Porsche 992 GT3 Cup	Porsche 4.0 L Flat-6	981	(Finland) Jori Ala-Jyrä	P	3
(Estonia) EST1 Racing	Porsche 992 GT3 Cup	Porsche 4.0 L Flat-6	981	(Estonia) Alex Reimann	P	3
(Austria) Neuhofer Rennsport	Porsche 992 GT3 Cup	Porsche 4.0 L Flat-6	985	(Austria) Felix Neuhofer	P	1, 3
(Austria) Neuhofer Rennsport	Porsche 992 GT3 Cup	Porsche 4.0 L Flat-6	985	(Austria) Markus Neuhofer	P	1, 3
(Austria) Neuhofer Rennsport	Porsche 992 GT3 Cup	Porsche 4.0 L Flat-6	985	(Austria) Martin Ragginger	P	1, 3
(Austria) Neuhofer Rennsport	Porsche 992 GT3 Cup	Porsche 4.0 L Flat-6	985	(Germany) Michael Birkner	P	1
(Austria) Neuhofer Rennsport	Porsche 992 GT3 Cup	Porsche 4.0 L Flat-6	985	(Switzerland) Paul Kasper	P	3
(Germany) MRS-GT Racing	Porsche 992 GT3 Cup	Porsche 4.0 L Flat-6	988	(Germany) Alex Herbst	Am	5
(Germany) MRS-GT Racing	Porsche 992 GT3 Cup	Porsche 4.0 L Flat-6	988	(Spain) Patrick Luciano Bay	Am	5
(Germany) MRS-GT Racing	Porsche 992 GT3 Cup	Porsche 4.0 L Flat-6	988	(Estonia) Antti Rammo	Am	5
(Germany) MRS-GT Racing	Porsche 992 GT3 Cup	Porsche 4.0 L Flat-6	988	(El Salvador) Rolando Saca	Am	5
(Lithuania) Porsche Baltic	Porsche 992 GT3 Cup	Porsche 4.0 L Flat-6	992	(Lithuania) Robertas Kupcikas	Am	1–2
(Lithuania) Porsche Baltic	Porsche 992 GT3 Cup	Porsche 4.0 L Flat-6	992	(Lithuania) Tautvydas Rudokas	Am	1–2
(Lithuania) Porsche Baltic	Porsche 992 GT3 Cup	Porsche 4.0 L Flat-6	992	(Lithuania) Andrius Šlimas	Am	1
(Lithuania) Porsche Baltic	Porsche 992 GT3 Cup	Porsche 4.0 L Flat-6	992	(Lithuania) Paulius Žadeika	Am	1
(Lithuania) Porsche Baltic	Porsche 992 GT3 Cup	Porsche 4.0 L Flat-6	992	(Lithuania) Nerijus Dagilis	Am	2
(Lithuania) Porsche Baltic	Porsche 992 GT3 Cup	Porsche 4.0 L Flat-6	992	(Lithuania) Mantas Mikuckas	Am	2
GT4
(South Korea) Atlas BX Motorsports	Mercedes-AMG GT4	Mercedes-AMG M178 4.0 L V8	403	(Canada) Steven Cho	All	
(South Korea) Atlas BX Motorsports	Mercedes-AMG GT4	Mercedes-AMG M178 4.0 L V8	403	(Netherlands) Roelof Bruins	All	
(South Korea) Atlas BX Motorsports	Mercedes-AMG GT4	Mercedes-AMG M178 4.0 L V8	403	(South Korea) Jongkyum Kim	All	
(South Korea) Atlas BX Motorsports	Mercedes-AMG GT4	Mercedes-AMG M178 4.0 L V8	403	(South Korea) Taekeun Yang	2–5	
(South Korea) Atlas BX Motorsports	Mercedes-AMG GT4	Mercedes-AMG M178 4.0 L V8	403	(South Korea) Donggi Noh	3–5	
(Lithuania) GSR Motorsport	Ginetta G56 GT4	GM LS3 6.2 L V8	405	(Lithuania) Ernesta Globytė	5	
(Lithuania) GSR Motorsport	Ginetta G56 GT4	GM LS3 6.2 L V8	405	(Lithuania) Mindaugas Liatukas	5	
(Lithuania) GSR Motorsport	Ginetta G56 GT4	GM LS3 6.2 L V8	405	(Lithuania) Aras Kvedaras	5	
(Lithuania) GSR Motorsport	Ginetta G56 GT4	GM LS3 6.2 L V8	405	(Lithuania) Rokas Kvedaras	5	
(Lithuania) GSR Motorsport	Ginetta G56 GT4	GM LS3 6.2 L V8	405	(Lithuania) Rolandas Salys	5	
(Belgium) Xwift Racing Events	Toyota GR Supra GT4	BMW B58B30 3.0 L Twin-Turbo I6	408	(Belgium) Tim de Borle	2	
(Belgium) Xwift Racing Events	Toyota GR Supra GT4	BMW B58B30 3.0 L Twin-Turbo I6	408	(Belgium) Pieter Denys	2	
(Belgium) Xwift Racing Events	Toyota GR Supra GT4	BMW B58B30 3.0 L Twin-Turbo I6	408	(Belgium) Steven Dewulf	2	
(Belgium) Xwift Racing Events	Toyota GR Supra GT4	BMW B58B30 3.0 L Twin-Turbo I6	408	(United Kingdom) Gavin Pickering	2	
(United Arab Emirates) Buggyra ZM Racing	Mercedes-AMG GT4	Mercedes-AMG M178 4.0 L V8	416	(Seychelles) Aliyyah Koloc	All	
(United Arab Emirates) Buggyra ZM Racing	Mercedes-AMG GT4	Mercedes-AMG M178 4.0 L V8	416	(Czech Republic) Adam Lacko	All	
(United Arab Emirates) Buggyra ZM Racing	Mercedes-AMG GT4	Mercedes-AMG M178 4.0 L V8	416	(Czech Republic) David Vrsecky	All	
(United Arab Emirates) Buggyra ZM Racing	Mercedes-AMG GT4	Mercedes-AMG M178 4.0 L V8	416	(Czech Republic) Jaroslav Janiš	5	
(United Arab Emirates) Buggyra ZM Racing	Mercedes-AMG GT4	Mercedes-AMG M178 4.0 L V8	416	(Czech Republic) Jaromir Jirik	5	
(Spain) PCR Sport	Mercedes-AMG GT4	Mercedes-AMG M178 4.0 L V8	418	(Spain) Vicente Dasi	2, 4	
(Spain) PCR Sport	Mercedes-AMG GT4	Mercedes-AMG M178 4.0 L V8	418	(Spain) Josep Parera	2, 4	
(Spain) PCR Sport	Mercedes-AMG GT4	Mercedes-AMG M178 4.0 L V8	418	(Spain) Jase Gleichberg	2	
(Spain) PCR Sport	Mercedes-AMG GT4	Mercedes-AMG M178 4.0 L V8	418	(Portugal) José Nuñez	4	
(United States) Team ACP - Tangerine Associates	BMW M4 GT4	BMW N55 3.0 L Twin-Turbo I6	421	(United States) Ken Goldburg	3	
(United States) Team ACP - Tangerine Associates	BMW M4 GT4	BMW N55 3.0 L Twin-Turbo I6	421	(United States) Catesby Jones	3	
(United States) Team ACP - Tangerine Associates	BMW M4 GT4	BMW N55 3.0 L Twin-Turbo I6	421	(United States) Steve Weber	3	
(Germany) Lionspeed GP by SRS Team Sorg Rennsport	Porsche 718 Cayman GT4 RS Clubsport	Porsche 4.0 L Flat-6	427	(United States) José Garcia	2	
(Germany) Lionspeed GP by SRS Team Sorg Rennsport	Porsche 718 Cayman GT4 RS Clubsport	Porsche 4.0 L Flat-6	427	(Germany) Patrick Kolb	2	
(Germany) Lionspeed GP by SRS Team Sorg Rennsport	Porsche 718 Cayman GT4 RS Clubsport	Porsche 4.0 L Flat-6	427	(United States) Daniel Miller	2	
(Switzerland) Hofor Racing by Bonk Motorsport	BMW M4 GT4 Gen II	BMW N55 3.0 L Twin-Turbo I6	431	(Germany) Michael Bonk	5	
(Switzerland) Hofor Racing by Bonk Motorsport	BMW M4 GT4 Gen II	BMW N55 3.0 L Twin-Turbo I6	431	(Switzerland) Martin Kroll	5	
(Switzerland) Hofor Racing by Bonk Motorsport	BMW M4 GT4 Gen II	BMW N55 3.0 L Twin-Turbo I6	431	(Germany) Michael Mayer	5	
(Switzerland) Hofor Racing by Bonk Motorsport	BMW M4 GT4 Gen II	BMW N55 3.0 L Twin-Turbo I6	431	(Germany) Felix Partl	5	
(Switzerland) Hofor Racing by Bonk Motorsport	BMW M4 GT4 Gen II	BMW N55 3.0 L Twin-Turbo I6	431	(Germany) Maximilian Partl	5	
(United Kingdom) Simpson Motorsport	BMW M4 GT4 Gen II	BMW N55 3.0 L Twin-Turbo I6	438	(United Kingdom) Carl Cavers	1	
(United Kingdom) Simpson Motorsport	BMW M4 GT4 Gen II	BMW N55 3.0 L Twin-Turbo I6	438	(New Zealand) David Holloway	1	
(United Kingdom) Simpson Motorsport	BMW M4 GT4 Gen II	BMW N55 3.0 L Twin-Turbo I6	438	(Cyprus) Vasily Vladykin	1	
(Czech Republic) Senkyr Motorsport	BMW M4 GT4 Gen II	BMW N55 3.0 L Twin-Turbo I6	444	(Slovakia) Tomas Erdelyi	2	
(Czech Republic) Senkyr Motorsport	BMW M4 GT4 Gen II	BMW N55 3.0 L Twin-Turbo I6	444	(Slovakia) Richard Gonda	2	
(Czech Republic) Senkyr Motorsport	BMW M4 GT4 Gen II	BMW N55 3.0 L Twin-Turbo I6	444	(Czech Republic) Robert Šenkýř	2	
(Czech Republic) Senkyr Motorsport	BMW M4 GT4 Gen II	BMW N55 3.0 L Twin-Turbo I6	444	(Czech Republic) Petr Svantner	2	
(Italy) Autorlando Sport	Porsche 718 Cayman GT4 RS Clubsport	Porsche 4.0 L Flat-6	475	(China) Chien Shang Chang	3	
(Italy) Autorlando Sport	Porsche 718 Cayman GT4 RS Clubsport	Porsche 4.0 L Flat-6	475	(Hong Kong) Kwan Kit Lo	3	
(Italy) Autorlando Sport	Porsche 718 Cayman GT4 RS Clubsport	Porsche 4.0 L Flat-6	475	(China) Qi Mi	3	
(Italy) Autorlando Sport	Porsche 718 Cayman GT4 RS Clubsport	Porsche 4.0 L Flat-6	475	(China) Yidong Zhang	3	
(Belgium) TCL Motorsport by AR Performance	BMW M4 GT4 Gen II	BMW N55 3.0 L Twin-Turbo I6	488	(Belgium) Gary Terclavers	2	
(Belgium) TCL Motorsport by AR Performance	BMW M4 GT4 Gen II	BMW N55 3.0 L Twin-Turbo I6	488	(Belgium) Kenny Terclavers	2	
(Belgium) TCL Motorsport by AR Performance	BMW M4 GT4 Gen II	BMW N55 3.0 L Twin-Turbo I6	488	(Belgium) Lars Zaenen	2	
SP4
(Germany) Herberth Motorsport	Porsche 911 GT3 R (992) (Note: Herberth Motorsport were granted permission to run their 992-spec Porsche 911 GT3 R at Mugello after their 991-spec car retired.)	Porsche 4.2 L Flat-6	600	(Switzerland) Daniel Allemann	1	
(Germany) Herberth Motorsport	Porsche 911 GT3 R (992)	Porsche 4.2 L Flat-6	600	(Germany) Ralf Bohn	1	
(Germany) Herberth Motorsport	Porsche 911 GT3 R (992)	Porsche 4.2 L Flat-6	600	(Germany) Alfred Renauer	1	
(Germany) Herberth Motorsport	Porsche 911 GT3 R (992)	Porsche 4.2 L Flat-6	600	(Germany) Robert Renauer	1	

GT3 entries
Icon	Class
P	GT3-Pro
PA	GT3-Pro Am
Am	GT3-Am
992 entries
Icon	Class
P	992-Pro
Am	992-Am

== Race results ==
Bold indicates overall winner.

Event		Circuit	GT3-Pro Winners	GT3-Pro Am Winners	GT3-Am Winners	GTX Winners	992-Pro Winners	992-Am Winners	GT4 Winners	Report
1		(Italy) Mugello Circuit	**(Antigua and Barbuda) No. 21 HAAS RT**	(Germany) No. 55 Land Motorsport	(United States) No. 27 Heart of Racing by SPS	(France) No. 701 Vortex V8	(Romania) No. 955 Willi Motorsport by Ebimotors	(Switzerland) No. 912 Centri Porsche Ticino	(South Korea) No. 403 Atlas BX Motorsports	Report
1		(Italy) Mugello Circuit	**(Belgium) Mathieu Detry** **(France) Stéphane Perrin** **(Belgium) Frédéric Vervisch**	(Germany) Christopher Mies (Germany) Tim Müller (Germany) Stefan Wieninger	(Canada) Roman De Angelis (United Kingdom) Ian James (United States) Gray Newell	(France) Lionel Amrouche (France) Philippe Bonnel (France) Philippe Gruau	(Italy) Fabrizio Broggi (Italy) Sabino de Castro (Romania) Sergiu Nicolae	(Italy) Max Busnelli (Italy) Francesco Fenici (Switzerland) Ivan Jacoma (Switzerland) Valerio Presezzi	(Netherlands) Roelof Bruins (Canada) Steven Cho (South Korea) Jongkyum Kim	Report
2		(Belgium) Circuit de Spa-Francorchamps	**(France) No. 26 Saintéloc Junior Team**	(Hong Kong) No. 16 Modena Motorsports	(United States) No. 27 Heart of Racing by SPS	(Belgium) No. 758 VDS Racing Adventures	(Germany) No. 930 HRT Performance	(Belgium) No. 904 Red Ant Racing	(United Arab Emirates) No. 416 Buggyra ZM Racing	Report
2		(Belgium) Circuit de Spa-Francorchamps	**(France) Erwan Bastard** **(France) Antoine Doquin** **(France) Paul Evrard**	(Switzerland) Mathias Beche (Canada) John Shen (Denmark) Benny Simonsen (Netherlands) Francis Tija	(Canada) Roman De Angelis (United Kingdom) Ian James (United States) Gray Newell	(Belgium) Nick Geelen (Belgium) Raphaël van der Straten (Belgium) Nathan Vanspringel	(United Kingdom) Adam Christodoulou (China) Xinzhe Xie (China) Eric Zang	(Belgium) Sam Dejonghe (Belgium) John de Wilde (Belgium) Philippe Wils	(Seychelles) Aliyyah Koloc (Czech Republic) Adam Lacko (Czech Republic) David Vrsecky	Report
3		(Italy) Autodromo Nazionale di Monza	(Switzerland) No. 8 Kessel Racing	**(Germany) No. 1 Scherer Sport PHX**	(United States) No. 85 CP Racing	(Lithuania) No. 720 RD Signs – Siauliai Racing Team	(Belgium) No. 903 Red Ant Racing	(Germany) No. 907 RPM Racing	(South Korea) No. 403 Atlas BX Motorsports	Report
3		(Italy) Autodromo Nazionale di Monza	(Italy) Alessandro Cutrera (Italy) Marco Frezza (Italy) David Fumanelli (Italy) Leonardo-Maria del Vecchio (Italy) Marco Talarico	**(Austria) Michael Doppelmayr** **(Germany) Elia Erhart** **(Germany) Pierre Kaffer**	(United States) Charles Espenlaub (United States) Shane Lewis (United States) Charles Putman	(Lithuania) Audrius Butkevicius (Italy) Nicola Michelon (Lithuania) Paulius Paskevicius	(Belgium) Yannick Redant (Belgium) Kai Rillaerts (South Africa) Arnold Neveling	(Germany) Philip Hamprecht (Sweden) Niclas Jönsson (United States) Tracy Krohn	(Netherlands) Roelof Bruins (Canada) Steven Cho (South Korea) Donggi Noh (South Korea) Jongkyum Kim (South Korea) Taekeun Yang	Report
4	QR	(Portugal) Circuito do Estoril	(Switzerland) No. 8 Kessel Racing	(Germany) No. 1 Scherer Sport PHX	**(Germany) No. 22 WTM by Rinaldi Racing**	(Lithuania) No. 720 RD Signs – Siauliai Racing Team	(Netherlands) No. 909 Red Camel-Jordans.nl	(Germany) No. 907 RPM Racing	(South Korea) No. 403 Atlas BX Motorsports	Report
4	QR	(Portugal) Circuito do Estoril	(Italy) Alessandro Cutrera (Italy) Marco Frezza (Italy) David Fumanelli (Italy) Leonardo-Maria del Vecchio (Italy) Marco Talarico	(Austria) Michael Doppelmayr (Germany) Elia Erhart (Germany) Christer Jöns (Germany) Pierre Kaffer	**(Germany) Daniel Keilwitz** **(Germany) Torsten Kratz** **(Germany) Jochen Krumbach** **(Germany) Georg Weiss** **(Germany) Leonard Weiss**	(Lithuania) Audrius Butkevicius (Italy) Nicola Michelon (Lithuania) Paulius Paskevicius	(Netherlands) Ivo Breukers (Netherlands) Luc Breukers (Netherlands) Rik Breukers (Switzerland) Fabian Danz	(Germany) Philip Hamprecht (Sweden) Niclas Jönsson (United States) Tracy Krohn	(Netherlands) Roelof Bruins (Canada) Steven Cho (South Korea) Donggi Noh (South Korea) Jongkyum Kim (South Korea) Taekeun Yang	Report
4	R	(Portugal) Circuito do Estoril	(Switzerland) No. 8 Kessel Racing	(Germany) No. 1 Scherer Sport PHX	**(Germany) No. 22 WTM by Rinaldi Racing**	(Lithuania) No. 720 RD Signs – Siauliai Racing Team	(Romania) No. 955 Willi Motorsport by Ebimotors	(Germany) No. 907 RPM Racing	(South Korea) No. 403 Atlas BX Motorsports	Report
4	R	(Portugal) Circuito do Estoril	(Italy) Alessandro Cutrera (Italy) Marco Frezza (Italy) David Fumanelli (Italy) Leonardo-Maria del Vecchio (Italy) Marco Talarico	(Austria) Michael Doppelmayr (Germany) Elia Erhart (Germany) Christer Jöns (Germany) Pierre Kaffer	**(Germany) Daniel Keilwitz** **(Germany) Torsten Kratz** **(Germany) Jochen Krumbach** **(Germany) Georg Weiss** **(Germany) Leonard Weiss**	(Lithuania) Audrius Butkevicius (Italy) Nicola Michelon (Lithuania) Paulius Paskevicius	(Italy) Papi Cosimo (Italy) Sabino de Castro (Romania) Sergiu Nicolae	(Germany) Philip Hamprecht (Sweden) Niclas Jönsson (United States) Tracy Krohn	(Netherlands) Roelof Bruins (Canada) Steven Cho (South Korea) Donggi Noh (South Korea) Jongkyum Kim (South Korea) Taekeun Yang	Report
5		(Spain) Circuit de Barcelona-Catalunya	**(France) No. 76 IMSA LS Group Performance**	(Antigua and Barbuda) No. 21 HAAS RT	(Germany) No. 34 Land Motorsport	(Austria) No. 714 Razoon - More than Racing	(Netherlands) No. 909 Red Camel-Jordans.nl	(Germany) No. 907 RPM Racing	(South Korea) No. 403 Atlas BX Motorsports	Report
5		(Spain) Circuit de Barcelona-Catalunya	**(France) Julien Andlauer** **(France) Grégory Guilvert** **(France) Laurent Hurgon** **(France) Simon Tirman**	(Belgium) Kris Cools (Belgium) Mathieu Detry (Austria) Max Hofer (Finland) Miika Panu (United Kingdom) Gavin Pickering	(Norway) Wiggo Dalmo (Germany) Max Edelhoff (Germany) Johannes Dr. Kirchhoff (Germany) Ingo Vogler (Germany) Tim Vogler	(Poland) Arthur Chwist (Austria) Daniel Drexel (Austria) Christian Loimayr (Austria) Dominik Olbert	(Netherlands) Ivo Breukers (Netherlands) Luc Breukers (Netherlands) Rik Breukers (Switzerland) Fabian Danz	(Germany) Philip Hamprecht (Sweden) Niclas Jönsson (United States) Tracy Krohn	(Netherlands) Roelof Bruins (Canada) Steven Cho (South Korea) Donggi Noh (South Korea) Jongkyum Kim (South Korea) Taekeun Yang	Report

=== Championship standings ===
Position	**1st**	**2nd**	**3rd**	**4th**	**5th**	**6th**	**7th**	**8th**	**9th**	**10th**	**11th**	**12th**	**13th**	**14th**	**15th**
Points	40	36	32	28	24	20	18	16	14	12	10	8	6	4	2

==== Teams' Overall ====
Pos.	Team	Car	Class	(Italy) MUG	(Belgium) SPA	(Italy) MNZ	(Portugal) EST		(Spain) BAR		Pts.
Pos.	Team	Car	Class	(Italy) MUG	(Belgium) SPA	(Italy) MNZ	QR	R	12H	24H	Pts.
1	(South Korea) No. 403 Atlas BX Motorsports	Mercedes-AMG GT4	GT4	23	37	**16**	13	**10**	23	19	200
2	(Germany) No. 907 RPM Racing	Porsche 992 GT3 Cup	992-Am	13		**11**	**17**	**12**	15	12	192
3	(Germany) No. 1 Scherer Sport PHX	Audi R8 LMS Evo II	GT3-Pro Am		**24**	1	**6**	**2**	3	4	188
4	(Romania) No. 955 Willi Motorsport by Ebimotors	Porsche 992 GT3 Cup	992	4	8	13	**8**	6	10	10	180
5	(Belgium) No. 903 Red Ant Racing	Porsche 992 GT3 Cup	992	8	6	6	9	8	**9**	**8**	180
6	(United Arab Emirates) No. 416 Buggyra ZM Racing	Mercedes-AMG GT4	GT4	26†	27	21	**14**	14†	**37**	**29**	178
7	(Lithuania) No. 720 RD Signs – Siauliai Racing Team	Lamborghini Huracán Super Trofeo Evo 2	GTX	30	22	**15**	**12**	**11**	18	23	174
8	(France) No. 701 Vortex V8	Vortex 1.0	GTX	24	40	22	18	15	24	20	172
9	(Netherlands) No. 909 Red Camel-Jordans.nl	Porsche 992 GT3 Cup	992	7	16	Ret	7	**7**	11	7	168
10	(United States) No. 85 CP Racing	Mercedes-AMG GT3 Evo	GT3-Am	29	13	**3**	4	4	2	28†	166
11	(Antigua and Barbuda) No. 21 HAAS RT	Audi R8 LMS Evo II	GT3-Pro	1	**43**	10†	**3**	17†			150
11	(Antigua and Barbuda) No. 21 HAAS RT	Audi R8 LMS Evo II	GT3-Pro Am						5	2	150
12	(Spain) No. 90 E2P Racing	Porsche 911 GT3 R (991.2)	GT3-Am	37†	11	5	5	5	39	30	146
13	(Belgium) No. 904 Red Ant Racing	Porsche 992 GT3 Cup	992-Am	22	9						131
13	(Belgium) No. 904 Red Ant Racing	Porsche 992 GT3 Cup	992-Pro				11	9	16	14	131
14	(Germany) No. 91 Herberth Motorsport	Porsche 911 GT3 R (991.2) 2 Porsche 911 GT3 R (992) 2	GT3-Pro	**Ret**							126
14	(Germany) No. 91 Herberth Motorsport	Porsche 911 GT3 R (991.2) 2 Porsche 911 GT3 R (992) 2	GT3-Pro Am		2	**2**			4	3	126
15	(Germany) No. 930 HRT Performance	Porsche 992 GT3 Cup	992-Am	17							124
15	(Germany) No. 930 HRT Performance	Porsche 992 GT3 Cup	992		5		16†	13	28	Ret	124
15	(Germany) No. 930 TORO Racing by HRT Performance	Porsche 992 GT3 Cup	992			12					124
16	(Germany) No. 34 Land Motorsport	Audi R8 LMS Evo II	GT3-Am	16†	10	Ret			7	6	118
17	(Germany) No. 967 HRT Performance	Porsche 992 GT3 Cup	992-Pro	19							112
17	(Germany) No. 967 HRT Performance	Porsche 992 GT3 Cup	992-Am		21	Ret	Ret	18†	14	11	112
18	(Switzerland) No. 11 Hofor Racing	Mercedes-AMG GT3	GT3-Am	5	34†				34	17	100
19	(Belgium) No. 758 VDS Racing Adventures	MARC II V8	GTX		15				19	16	92
20	(Lithuania) No. 71 Juta Racing	Audi R8 LMS Evo II	GT3-Am	15	12						91
20	(Lithuania) No. 71 Juta Racing	Audi R8 LMS Evo II	GT3-Pro Am						15	12	91
21	(Germany) No. 719 9und11 Racing	Porsche 991 GT3 Cup II MR	GTX	32	26	17					92
22	(Switzerland) No. 8 Kessel Racing	Ferrari 488 GT3 Evo 2020 1 Ferrari 296 GT3 2	GT3-Pro	**14**		7	2	3			90
23	(United States) No. 27 Heart of Racing by SPS	Mercedes-AMG GT3 Evo	GT3-Am	3	3						80
24	(France) No. 26 Saintéloc Junior Team	Audi R8 LMS Evo II	GT3-Pro	2	1						76
25	(Lithuania) No. 72 Juta Racing	Audi R8 LMS Evo 2 Audi R8 LMS Evo II 1	GT3-Am	21	Ret				13	13	72
26	(France) No. 702 Vortex V8	Vortex 1.0	GTX	25	Ret				30	31	66
27	(Spain) No. 418 PCR Sport	Mercedes-AMG GT4	GT4		42		15	16			66
28	(Austria) No. 714 Razoon - More than Racing	KTM X-Bow GT2	GTX						**17**	**15**	60
29	(Austria) No. 985 Neuhofer Rennsport	Porsche 992 GT3 Cup	992	10		8					60
30	(Germany) No. 22 WTM by Rinaldi Racing	Ferrari 296 GT3	GT3-Am				**1**	**1**	**36**†	**Ret**	60
31	(France) No. 76 IMSA LS Group Performance	Porsche 911 GT3 R (992)	GT3-Pro						**1**	**1**	60
32	(Germany) No. 928 NKPP by HRT Performance	Porsche 992 GT3 Cup	992-Am	33†					22	33†	58
33	(Germany) No. 929 HRT Performance	Porsche 992 GT3 Cup	992-Am		18						56
33	(Germany) No. 929 HRT Performance	Porsche 992 GT3 Cup	992						12	34†	56
34	(Switzerland) No. 431 Hofor Racing by Bonk Motorsport	BMW M4 GT4 Gen II	GT4						34	27	54
35	(Germany) No. 988 MRS-GT Racing	Porsche 992 GT3 Cup	992-Am						26	25	50
36	(Lithuania) No. 992 Porsche Baltic	Porsche 992 GT3 Cup	992-Am	20	23						44
37	(Germany) No. 23 Car Collection Motorsport	Porsche 911 GT3 R (992)	GT3-Pro Am						6	5	42
38	(Lithuania) No. 405 Motorsport	Ginetta G56 GT4	GT4						38	32	42
39	(Switzerland) No. 917 Orchid Racing Team	Porsche 992 GT3 Cup	992-Am						33	26	42
40	(Germany) No. 55 Land Motorsport	Audi R8 LMS Evo II	GT3-Pro Am	18	Ret						40
41	(Switzerland) No. 912 Centri Porsche Ticino	Porsche 992 GT3 Cup	992-Am	9							40
42	(United Kingdom) No. 906 Richardson Racing	Porsche 992 GT3 Cup	992-Am						**32**	**28**	40
43	(Hong Kong) No. 16 Modena Motorsports	Porsche 911 GT3 R (992)	GT3-Pro Am		7						40
44	(Spain) No. 715 NM Racing Team	Mercedes-AMG GT2	GTX						27	21	40
45	No. 763 GT3 Poland	Lamborghini Huracán Super Trofeo Evo 2	GTX		19						36
46	(Belgium) No. 924 PK Carsport	Porsche 992 GT3 Cup	992-Am		**14**						36
47	(Estonia) No. 981 EST1 Racing	Porsche 992 GT3 Cup	992-Am			**14**					36
48	(United States) No. 421 Team ACP - Tangerine Associates	BMW M4 GT4	GT4			18					36
49	(Belgium) No. 488 TCL Motorsport by AR Performance	BMW M4 GT4 Gen II	GT4		30						36
50	(Italy) No. 15 BMW Italia Ceccato Racing	BMW M4 GT3	GT3-Am			4					36
51	(Italy) No. 973 Ebimotors	Porsche 992 GT3 Cup	GT3-Am	11							36
52	(United Arab Emirates) No. 977 Rabdan Motorsport by HRT Performance	Porsche 992 GT3 Cup	992			**9**					32
53	(United Kingdom) No. 438 Simpson Motorsport	BMW M4 GT4 Gen II	GT4	27							32
54	(Germany) No. 427 Lionspeed GP by SRS Team Sorg Rennsport	Porsche 718 Cayman GT4 RS Clubsport	GT4		31						32
55	(France) No. 88 AKKodis ASP Team	Mercedes-AMG GT3 Evo	GT3-Am	6							32
56	(Germany) No. 919 Black Falcon Team TEXTAR	Porsche 992 GT3 Cup	992-Am		20						28
57	(Belgium) No. 408 Xwift Racing Events	Toyota GR Supra GT4	GT4		36						28
58	(Poland) No. 69 JP Motorsport	McLaren 720S GT3 Evo	GT3-Pro		4						28
59	(Spain) No. 709 Escuderia Faraon	Porsche 991 GT3 Cup I	GTX						35	35†	27
60	(Italy) No. 726 Lotus PB Racing	Lotus Exige V6 Cup R	GTX	Ret	38						24
61	(Germany) No. 10 Leipert Motorsport	Lamborghini Huracán GT3 Evo	GT3-Am		17						20
62	(Czech Republic) No. 444 Senkyr Motorsport	BMW M4 GT4 Gen II	GT4		**41**						20
63	(Italy) No. 923 Enrico Fulgenzi Racing	Porsche 992 GT3 Cup	992-Am	12							18
64	(Germany) No. 920 Black Falcon Team TEXTAR	Porsche 992 GT3 Cup	992-Am		25						18
65	(Belgium) No. 950 Q1 Trackracing	Porsche 992 GT3 Cup	992-Am			20†					16
66	(Italy) No. 58 MP Racing	Mercedes-AMG GT3 Evo	GT3-Am		44†		10	Ret			16
67	(Belgium) No. 969 Speedlover	Porsche 992 GT3 Cup	992-Am		35						16
68	(Italy) No. 475 Autorlando Sport	Porsche 718 Cayman GT4 RS Clubsport	GT4		Ret						0
69	(France) No. 910 SebLajoux Racing by DUWO Racing	Porsche 992 GT3 Cup	GT4						20	Ret	0
70	(Germany) No. 755 Land Motorsport	Audi TT RS	GTX		Ret						0
Pos.	Team	Car	Class	(Italy) MUG	(Belgium) SPA	(Italy) MNZ	(Portugal) EST		(Spain) BAR		Pts.
Pos.	Team	Car	Class	(Italy) MUG	(Belgium) SPA	(Italy) MNZ	QR	R	12H	24H	Pts.

Colour	Result
Gold	Winner
Silver	Second place
Bronze	Third place
Green	Points classification
Blue	Non-points classification
Blue	Non-classified finish (NC)
Purple	Retired, not classified (Ret)
Red	Did not qualify (DNQ)
Red	Did not pre-qualify (DNPQ)
Black	Disqualified (DSQ)
White	Did not start (DNS)
White	Withdrew (WD)
White	Race cancelled (C)
Blank	Did not practice (DNP)
Blank	Did not arrive (DNA)
Blank	Excluded (EX)

**Bold** – Pole
Italics – Fastest Lap

† – Drivers did not finish the race, but were classified as they completed over 60% of the class winner's race distance.

==== GT3 Drivers' ====
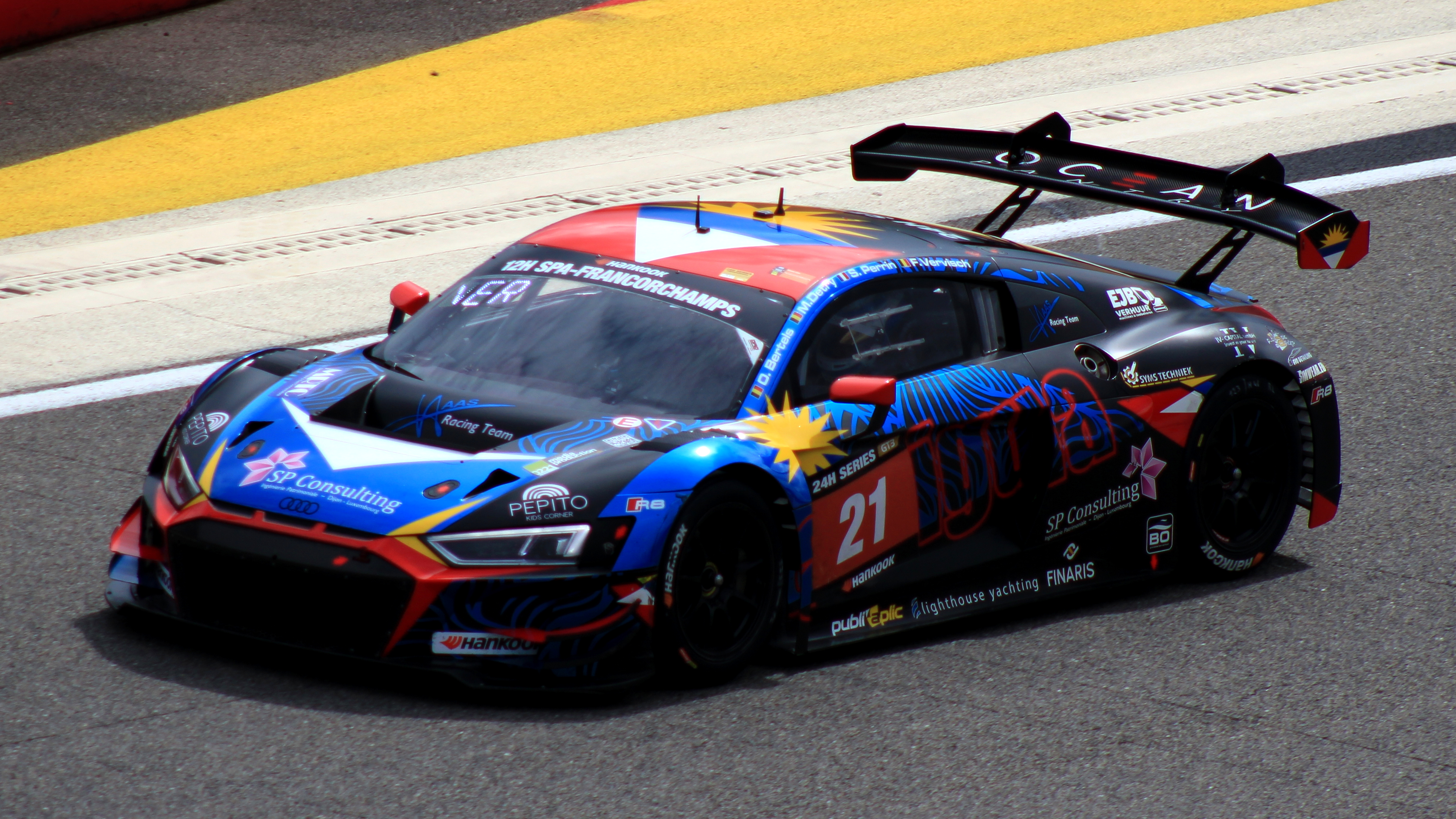
Mathieu Detry and HAAS RT lead the GT3 standings.

Pos.	Drivers	Team	(Italy) MUG	(Belgium) SPA	(Italy) MNZ	(Portugal) EST		(Spain) BAR	Pts.
1	(Belgium) Mathieu Detry	(Antigua and Barbuda) No. 21 HAAS RT	1	**43**	10†	3	17†		100
2	(United States) Charles Espenlaub (United States) Shane Lewis (United States) Charles Putman	(United States) No. 85 CP Racing	29	13	3	4	4		98
3	(Germany) Elia Erhart (Germany) Pierre Kaffer	(Germany) No. 1 Scherer Sport PHX		24	1	6	2		96
4	(Italy) Alessandro Cutrera (Italy) Marco Frezza (Italy) David Fumanelli (Italy) Marco Talarico	(Switzerland) No. 8 Kessel Racing	14		7	2	3		90
5	(Austria) Michael Doppelmayr	(Germany) No. 1 Scherer Sport PHX		24	1	6	2		86
5	(Spain) Pablo Burguera (Spain) Javier Morcillo (Spain) Antonio Sainero	(Spain) No. 90 E2P Racing	37†	11	5	5	5		86
6	(Belgium) Frédéric Vervisch	(Antigua and Barbuda) No. 21 HAAS RT	1	**43**		3	17†		86
7	(France) Erwan Bastard (France) Paul Evrard	(France) No. 26 Saintéloc Junior Team	2	1					76
8	(United States) Joe Foster	(United States) No. 85 CP Racing			3	4	4		74
9	(Switzerland) Daniel Allemann (Germany) Ralf Bohn (Germany) Alfred Renauer (Germany) Robert Renauer	(Germany) No. 91 Herberth Motorsport	**Ret**	2	**2**				72
10	(Canada) Roman De Angelis (United Kingdom) Ian James (United States) Gray Newell	(United States) No. 27 Heart of Racing by SPS	3	3					64
11	(Germany) Daniel Keilwitz (Germany) Torsten Kratz (Germany) Jochen Krumbach (Germany) Leonard Weiss	(Germany) No. 22 WTM by Rinaldi Racing				**1**	**1**		60
12	(Italy) Leonardo-Maria del Vecchio	(Switzerland) No. 8 Kessel Racing	14		7	2	3		58
13	(Germany) Christer Jöns	(Germany) No. 1 Scherer Sport PHX				6	2		46
13	(France) Stéphane Perrin (Belgium) Frédéric Vervisch	(Antigua and Barbuda) No. 21 HAAS RT	1	**43**					46
14	(Belgium) Gregory Servais	(Antigua and Barbuda) No. 21 HAAS RT				3	17†		36
14	(Switzerland) Michael Kroll (Switzerland) Chantal Prinz (Germany) Alexander Prinz (Germany) Carsten Tilke	(Switzerland) No. 11 Hofor Racing	5	34†					36
14	(Germany) Johannes Dr. Kirchhoff (Germany) Tim Vogler	(Germany) No. 34 Land Motorsport	16†	10					36
15	(Lithuania) Arunas Geciauskas (Lithuania) Jonas Gelžinis (Lithuania) Vytenis Gulbinas (Ukraine) Evgeny Sokolovsky	(Lithuania) No. 71 Juta Racing	15	12					34
Pos.	Drivers	Team	(Italy) MUG	(Belgium) SPA	(Italy) MNZ	(Portugal) EST		(Spain) BAR	Pts.

==== GT3 Teams' ====
Pos.	Team	(Italy) MUG	(Belgium) SPA	(Italy) MNZ	(Portugal) EST		(Spain) BAR	Pts.
1	(Antigua and Barbuda) No. 21 HAAS RT	1	**43**	10†	3	17†		100
2	(United States) No. 85 CP Racing	29	13	3	4	4		98
3	(Germany) No. 1 Scherer Sport PHX		24	1	6	2		96
4	(Switzerland) No. 8 Kessel Racing	14		7	2	3		90
5	(Spain) No. 90 E2P Racing	37†	11	5	5	5		86
6	(France) No. 26 Saintéloc Junior Team	2	1					76
7	(Germany) No. 91 Herberth Motorsport	**Ret**	2	**2**				72
8	(United States) No. 27 Heart of Racing by SPS	3	3					64
9	(Germany) No. 22 WTM by Rinaldi Racing				**1**	**1**		60
10	(Switzerland) No. 11 Hofor Racing	5	34†					36
11	(Germany) No. 34 Land Motorsport	16†	10	Ret				36
12	(Lithuania) No. 71 Juta Racing	15	12					34
13	(Germany) No. 55 Land Motorsport	18	Ret					14
14	(Italy) No. 58 MP Racing		44†		10	Ret		13
15	(Lithuania) No. 72 Juta Racing	21	Ret					12
teams ineligible for final championship positions
	(Italy) No. 15 BMW Italia Ceccato Racing			4				
	(Luxembourg) No. 69 JP Motorsport		4					
	(Hong Kong) No. 16 Modena Motorsports		7					
	(France) No. 88 AKKodis ASP Team	6						
	(Germany) No. 10 Leipert Motorsport		17					
Pos.	Team	(Italy) MUG	(Belgium) SPA	(Italy) MNZ	(Portugal) EST		(Spain) BAR	Pts.

==== GT3-Pro Am Drivers' ====
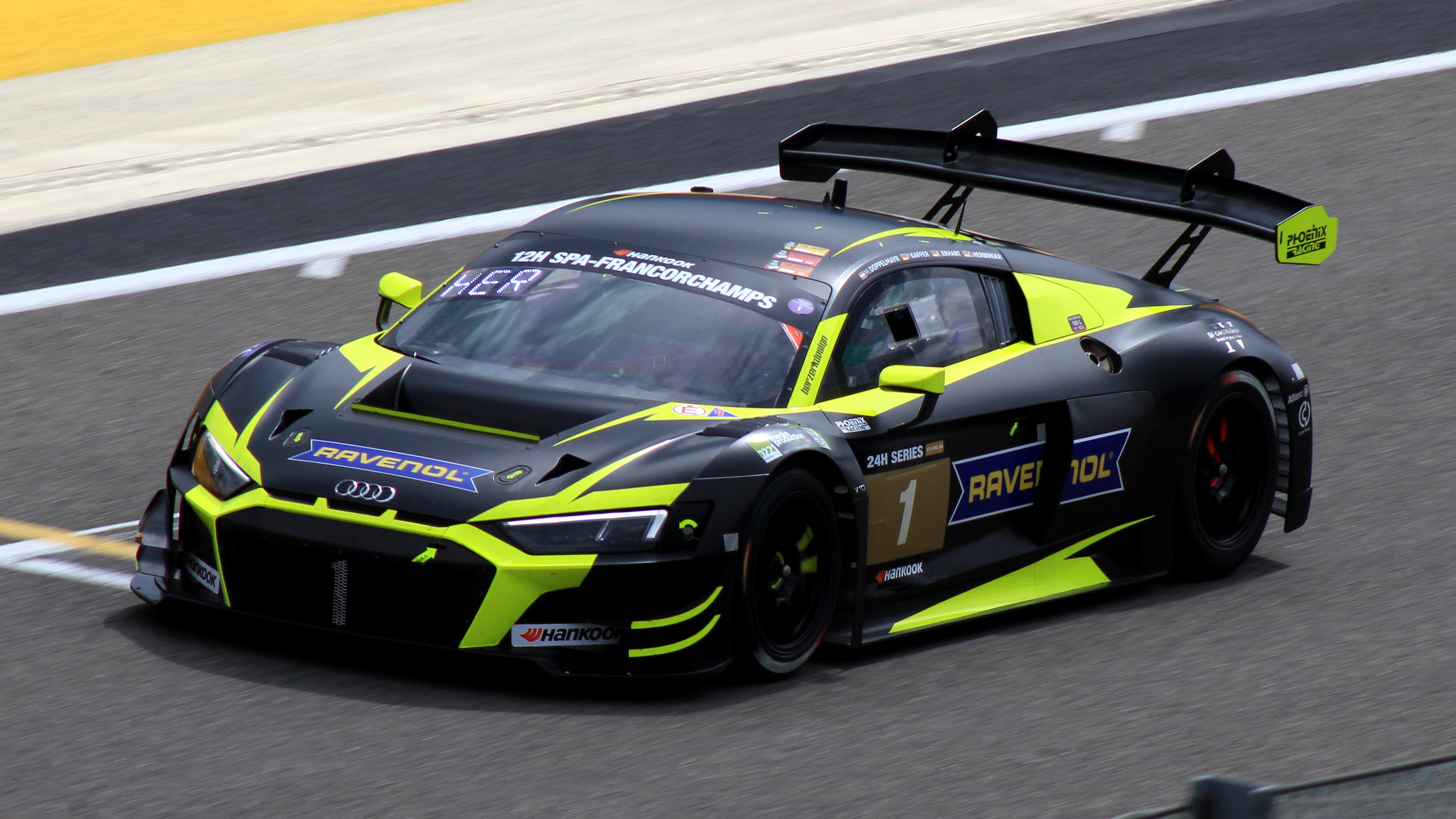
Michael Doppelmayr, Elia Erhart, Pierre Kaffer and Scherer Sport PHX lead the GT3 Pro-Am standings.

Pos.	Drivers	Team	(Italy) MUG	(Belgium) SPA	(Italy) MNZ	(Portugal) EST		(Spain) BAR	Pts.
1	(Germany) Elia Erhart (Germany) Pierre Kaffer	(Germany) No. 1 Scherer Sport PHX		**24**	1	**6**	**2**		136
2	(Austria) Michael Doppelmayr	(Germany) No. 1 Scherer Sport PHX		**24**	1	**6**	**2**		100
3	(Germany) Christer Jöns	(Germany) No. 1 Scherer Sport PHX				**6**	**2**		60
4	(Germany) Christopher Mies (Germany) Tim Müller (Germany) Stefan Wieninger	(Germany) No. 55 Land Motorsport	18	Ret					40
5	(Switzerland) Daniel Allemann (Germany) Ralf Bohn (Germany) Alfred Renauer (Germany) Robert Renauer	(Germany) No. 91 Herberth Motorsport	**Ret**		**2**				36
drivers ineligible for final championship positions
	(Switzerland) Mathias Beche (Canada) John Shen (Denmark) Benny Simonsen (Netherlands) Francis Tija	(Hong Kong) No. 16 Modena Motorsports		7					
	(Germany) Sven Herberger	(Germany) No. 1 Scherer Sport PHX		**24**					
Pos.	Drivers	Team	(Italy) MUG	(Belgium) SPA	(Italy) MNZ	(Portugal) EST		(Spain) BAR	Pts.

==== GT3-Pro Am Teams' ====
Pos.	Team	(Italy) MUG	(Belgium) SPA	(Italy) MNZ	(Portugal) EST		(Spain) BAR	Pts.
1	(Germany) No. 1 Scherer Sport PHX		**24**	1	**6**	**2**		136
3	(Germany) No. 55 Land Motorsport	18	Ret					40
3	(Germany) No. 91 Herberth Motorsport	**Ret**		**2**				36
teams ineligible for final championship positions
	(Hong Kong) No. 16 Modena Motorsports		7					
Pos.	Team	(Italy) MUG	(Belgium) SPA	(Italy) MNZ	(Portugal) EST		(Spain) BAR	Pts.

==== GT3-Am Drivers' ====
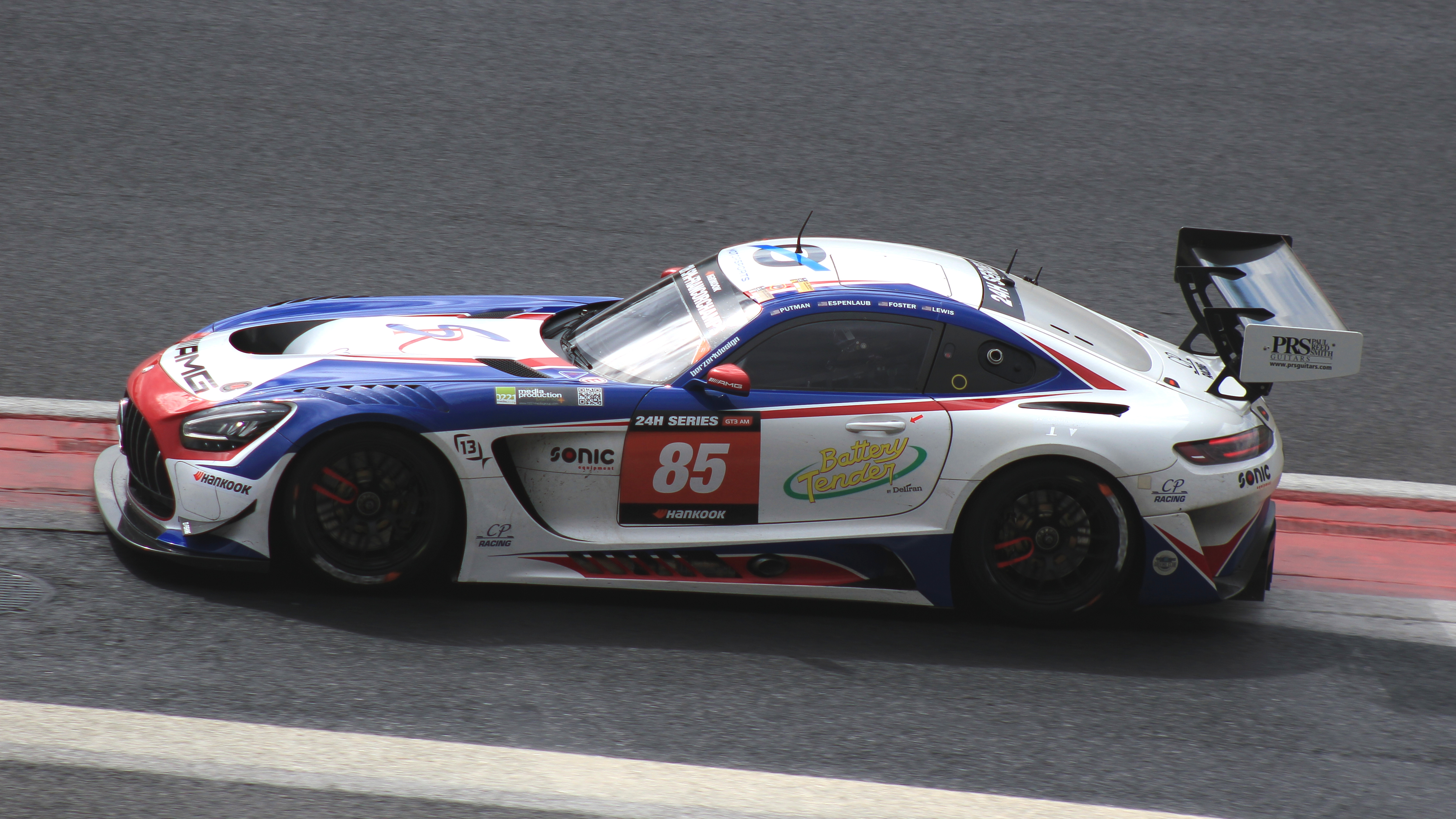
Charles Espenlaub, Shane Lewis, Charles Putman and CP Racing lead the GT3 Am standings.

Pos.	Drivers	Team	(Italy) MUG	(Belgium) SPA	(Italy) MNZ	(Portugal) EST		(Spain) BAR	Pts.
1	(United States) Charles Espenlaub (United States) Shane Lewis (United States) Charles Putman	(United States) No. 85 CP Racing	29	13	**3**	4	4		136
2	(Spain) Pablo Burguera (Spain) Javier Morcillo (Spain) Antonio Sainero	(Spain) No. 90 E2P Racing	37†	11	5	5	5		128
3	(United States) Joe Foster	(United States) No. 85 CP Racing			**3**	4	4		94
4	(Canada) Roman De Angelis (United Kingdom) Ian Games (United States) Gray Newell	(United States) No. 27 Heart of Racing by SPS	3	**3**					80
5	(Germany) Daniel Keilwitz (Germany) Jochen Krumbach (Germany) Leonard Weiss	(Germany) No. 22 WTM by Rinaldi Racing				**1**	**1**		60
5	(Germany) Johannes Dr. Kirchhoff	(Germany) No. 34 Land Motorsport	16†	10	Ret				60
5	(Germany) Tim Vogler	(Germany) No. 34 Land Motorsport	16†	10					60
6	(Lithuania) Arunas Geciauskas (Lithuania) Jonas Gelžinis (Lithuania) Vytenis Gulbinas (Ukraine) Evgeny Sokolovsky	(Lithuania) No. 71 Juta Racing	**15**	12					56
7	(Switzerland) Michael Kroll (Germany) Alexander Prinz (Switzerland) Chantal Prinz	(Switzerland) No. 11 Hofor Racing	5	34†					54
8	(Germany) Max Edelhoff	(Germany) No. 34 Land Motorsport		10	Ret				36
9	(Italy) Corinna Gostner (Italy) Manuela Gostner (Italy) Thomas Gostner	(Italy) No. 58 MP Racing		44†		13	Ret		30
9	(Germany) Torsten Kratz (Germany) Georg Weiss	(Germany) No. 22 WTM by Rinaldi Racing				**1**	**1**		20
9	(Lithuania) Egidijus Gelūnas (Lithuania) Aurimas Jablonskis	(Lithuania) No. 72 Juta Racing	21	Ret					20
11	(Italy) Fabrizio Crestani	(Italy) No. 58 MP Racing				13	Ret		14
drivers ineligible for final championship positions
	(Brazil) Átila Abreu (Brazil) Leonardo Sanchez (Brazil) William Freire	(Italy) No. 15 BMW Italia Ceccato Racing			4				
	(United States) Carsten Tilke	(Switzerland) No. 11 Hofor Racing	5						
	(France) Jean-Luc Beaubelique (France) Jérôme Policand (France) Benjamin Ricci (France) Mauro Ricci	(France) No. 88 AKKodis ASP Team	6						
	(Germany) Ingo Vogler	(Germany) No. 34 Land Motorsport	16†						
	(Lithuania) Oskaras Brazaitis (Lithuania) Audrius Navickas	(Lithuania) No. 72 Juta Racing	21						
	(United States) Jean-Francois Brunot (New Zealand) Brendon Leitch (China) Kurong Li	(Germany) No. 10 Leipert Motorsport		17					
	(Germany) Max Partl	(Switzerland) No. 11 Hofor Racing		34†					
	(Italy) David Gostner	(Italy) No. 58 MP Racing		44†					
	(Lithuania) Jonas Karklys (Lithuania) Joana Survilaité	(Lithuania) No. 72 Juta Racing		Ret					
	(Germany) Elmar Grimm	(Germany) No. 34 Land Motorsport			Ret				
Pos.	Drivers	Team	(Italy) MUG	(Belgium) SPA	(Italy) MNZ	(Portugal) EST		(Spain) BAR	Pts.

==== GT3-Am Teams' ====
Pos.	Team	(Italy) MUG	(Belgium) SPA	(Italy) MNZ	(Portugal) EST		(Spain) BAR	Pts.
1	(United States) No. 85 CP Racing	29	13	**3**	4	4		136
2	(Spain) No. 90 E2P Racing	37†	11	5	5	5		128
3	(United States) No. 27 Heart of Racing by SPS	3	**3**					80
4	(Germany) No. 22 WTM by Rinaldi Racing				**1**	**1**		60
5	(Germany) No. 34 Land Motorsport	16†	10	Ret				60
6	(Lithuania) No. 71 Juta Racing	**15**	12					56
7	(Switzerland) No. 11 Hofor Racing	5	34†					54
8	(Italy) No. 58 MP Racing		44†		13	Ret		30
9	(Lithuania) No. 72 Juta Racing	21	Ret					20
teams ineligible for final championship positions
	(Italy) No. 15 BMW Italia Ceccato Racing			4				
	(France) No. 88 AKKodis ASP Team	6						
	(Germany) No. 10 Leipert Motorsport		17					
Pos.	Team	(Italy) MUG	(Belgium) SPA	(Italy) MNZ	(Portugal) EST		(Spain) BAR	Pts.

==== GTX Drivers' ====
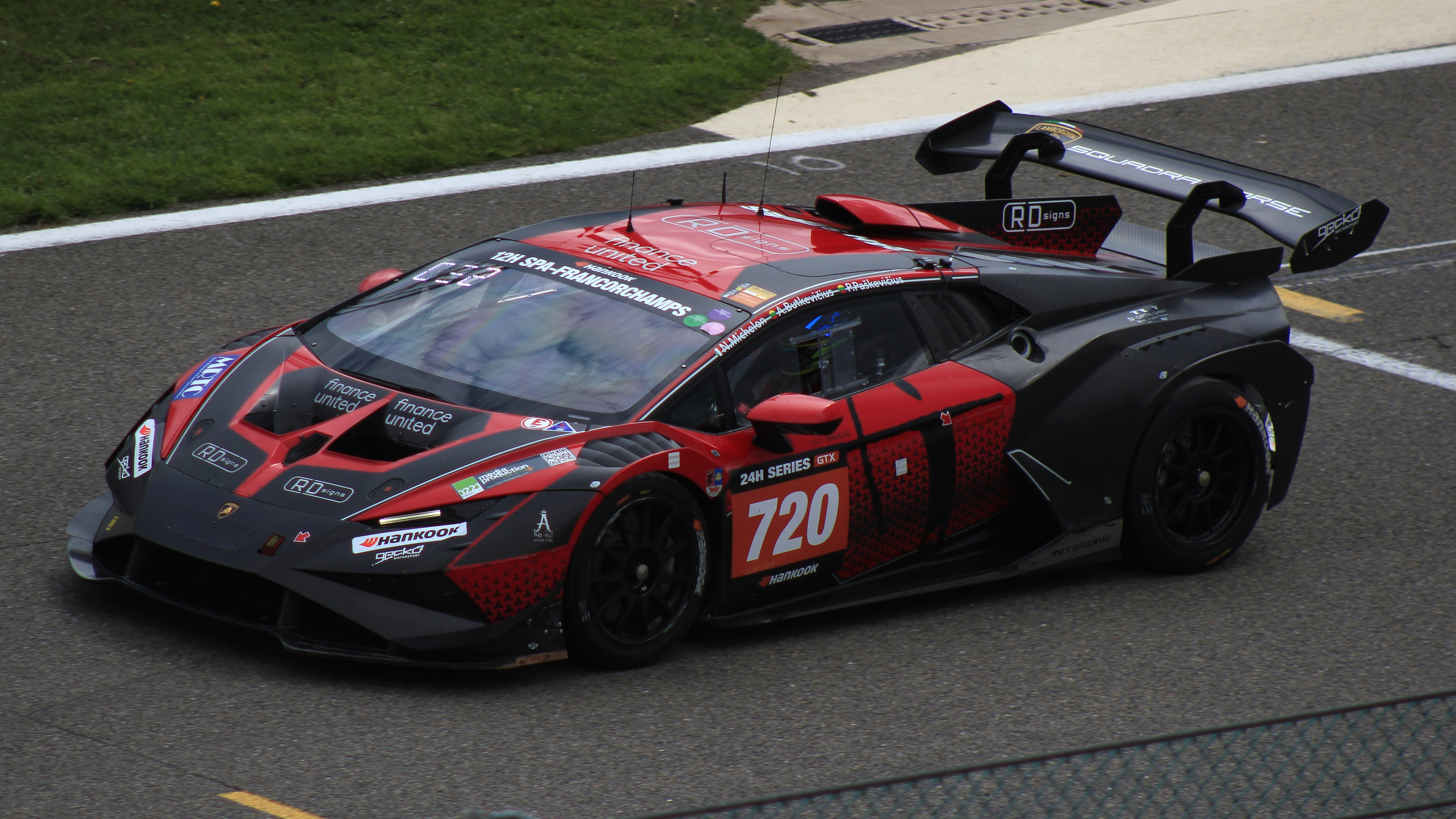
Audrius Butkevicius, Nicola Michelon, Paulius Paskevicius and RD Signs – Siauliai Racing Team lead the GTX standings.

Pos.	Drivers	Team	(Italy) MUG	(Belgium) SPA	(Italy) MNZ	(Portugal) EST		(Spain) BAR	Pts.
1	(Lithuania) Audrius Butkevicius (Italy) Nicola Michelon (Lithuania) Paulius Paskevicius	(Lithuania) No. 720 RD Signs – Siauliai Racing Team	**30**	22	**30**	**12**	**11**		164
2	(France) Lionel Amrouche	(France) No. 701 Vortex V8	24	40	22	18	15		146
3	(France) Philippe Bonnel	(France) No. 701 Vortex V8	24		22	18	15		126
4	(Germany) Georg Goder (Germany) Ralf Oehme (Germany) Martin Schlüter	(Germany) No. 719 9und11 Racing	32	26	17				92
5	(France) Gilles Courtois	(France) No. 701 Vortex V8			22	18	15		86
6	(Germany) Leonard Oehme	(Germany) No. 719 9und11 Racing	32		17				64
7	(France) Philippe Gruau	(France) No. 701 Vortex V8	24						40
7	(France) Philippe Gruau	(France) No. 702 Vortex V8		Ret					40
8	(Switzerland) Laurent Misbach (France) Lucas Sugliano	(France) No. 702 Vortex V8	25	Ret					36
9	(Italy) Stefano D'Aste (Monaco) Vito Utzieri	(Italy) No. 726 Lotus PB Racing	Ret	38					24
drivers ineligible for final championship positions
	(Belgium) Nick Geelen (Belgium) Raphaël van der Straten (Belgium) Nathan Vanspringel	(Belgium) No. 758 VDS Racing Adventures		**15**					
	(France) Adrian Lewandowski (Poland) Andrzej Lewandowski (Poland) Mariusz Miękoś	No. 763 GT3 Poland		19					
	(France) Pierre Fontaine	(France) No. 702 Vortex V8	25						
	(Germany) Tim Scheerbarth	(Germany) No. 719 9und11 Racing		26					
	(Italy) Maurizio Copetti (Italy) Federico Leo	(Italy) No. 726 PB Racing		38					
	(France) Olivier Gomez	(France) No. 701 Vortex V8		40					
	(Monaco) Luca Littardi (Italy) Costantino Peroni (Italy) Pietro Vergnano	(Italy) No. 726 PB Racing	Ret						0
	(Germany) Ben Koslowski (Germany) Christopher Tiger	(Germany) No. 755 Land Motorsport		Ret					0
Pos.	Drivers	Team	(Italy) MUG	(Belgium) SPA	(Italy) MNZ	(Portugal) EST		(Spain) BAR	Pts.

==== GTX Teams' ====
Pos.	Team	(Italy) MUG	(Belgium) SPA	(Italy) MNZ	(Portugal) EST		(Spain) BAR	Pts.
1	(Lithuania) No. 720 RD Signs – Siauliai Racing Team	**30**	20	**30**	**12**	**11**		164
2	(France) No. 701 Vortex V8	24	40	22	18	15		146
3	(Germany) No. 719 9und11 Racing	32	26	17				92
4	(France) No. 702 Vortex V8	25	Ret					36
5	(Italy) No. 726 Lotus PB Racing	Ret	38					38
teams ineligible for final championship positions
	(Belgium) No. 758 VDS Racing Adventures		**15**					
	No. 763 GT3 Poland		19					
	(Germany) No. 755 Land Motorsport		Ret					
Pos.	Team	(Italy) MUG	(Belgium) SPA	(Italy) MNZ	(Portugal) EST		(Spain) BAR	Pts.

==== 992 Drivers' ====
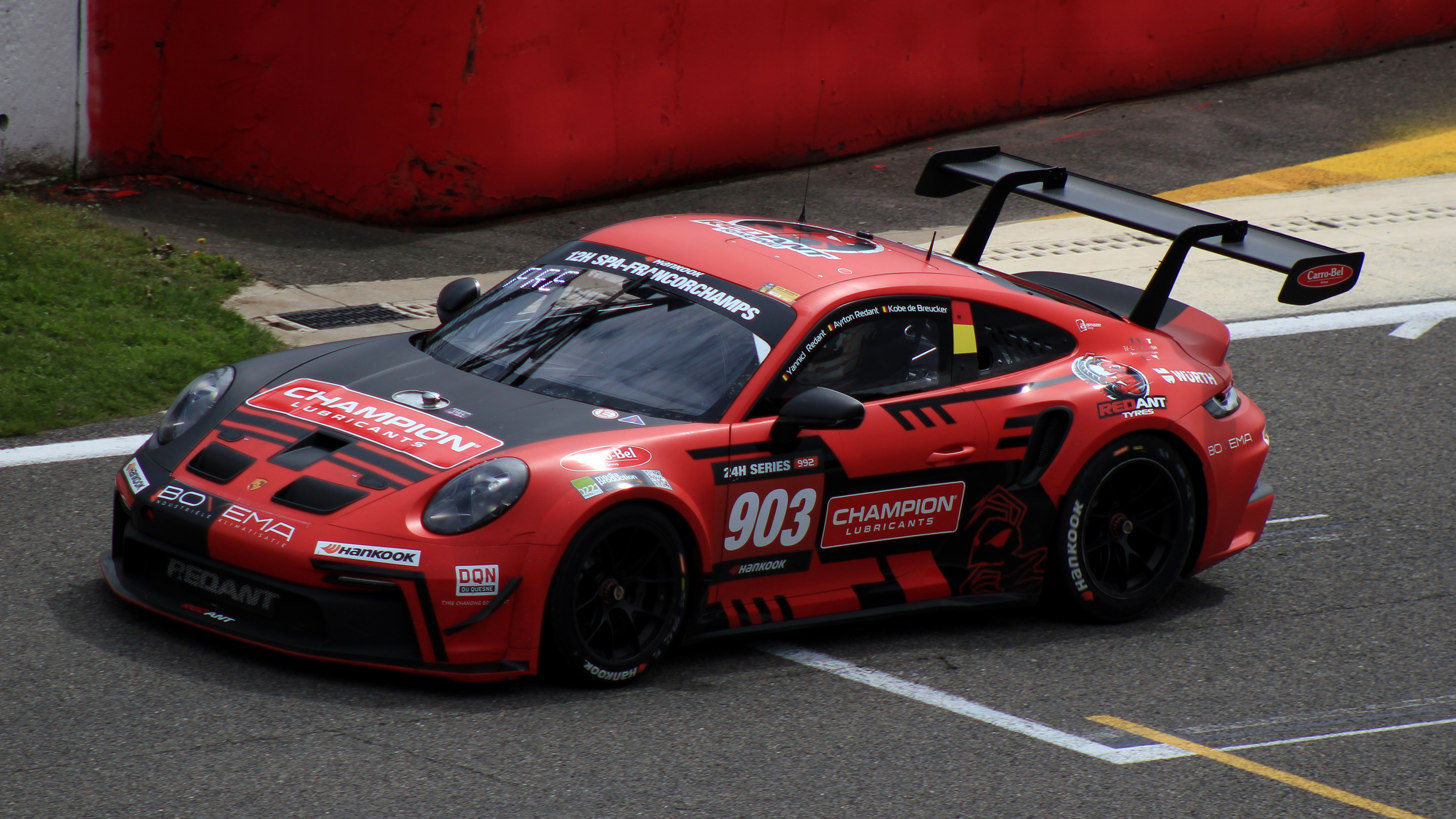
Yannick Redant and Red Ant Racing lead the 992 standings.

Pos.	Drivers	Team	(Italy) MUG	(Belgium) SPA	(Italy) MNZ	(Portugal) EST		(Spain) BAR	Pts.
1	(Belgium) Yannick Redant	(Belgium) No. 903 Red Ant Racing	**8**	6	6	9	8		156
2	(Italy) Sabino de Castro (Romania) Sergiu Nicolae	(Romania) No. 955 Willi Motorsport by Ebimotors	4	8	13	**8**	6		150
3	(Belgium) Kobe de Breucker (Belgium) Ayrton Redant	(Belgium) No. 903 Red Ant Racing	**8**	6		9	8		116
4	(Netherlands) Ivo Breukers (Netherlands) Luc Breukers (Netherlands) Rik Breukers	(Netherlands) No. 909 Red Camel-Jordans.nl	7	**16**	Ret	7	**7**		112
5	(Switzerland) Fabian Danz	(Netherlands) No. 909 Red Camel-Jordans.nl	7			7	**7**		92
6	(Germany) Philip Hamprecht (Sweden) Niclas Jönsson (United States) Tracy Krohn	(Germany) No. 907 RPM Racing	13		11	17	12		44
7	(Italy) Fabrizio Broggi	(Romania) No. 955 Willi Motorsport by Ebimotors	4	8	13				72
8	(United Kingdom) Adam Christodoulou (China) Xinzhe Xie (China) Eric Zang	(Germany) No. 930 HRT Performance		5	**12**				64
9	(Germany) Michael Birkner (Austria) Markus Neuhofer (Austria) Felix Neuhofer (Austria) Martin Ragginger	(Austria) No. 985 Neuhofer Rennsport	10		8				60
10	(Italy) Papi Cosimo	(Romania) No. 955 Willi Motorsport by Ebimotors				**8**	6		58
Pos.	Drivers	Team	(Italy) MUG	(Belgium) SPA	(Italy) MNZ	(Portugal) EST		(Spain) BAR	Pts.

==== 992 Teams' ====
Pos.	Team	(Italy) MUG	(Belgium) SPA	(Italy) MNZ	(Portugal) EST		(Spain) BAR	Pts.
1	(Belgium) No. 903 Red Ant Racing	**8**	6	6	9	8		156
2	(Romania) No. 955 Willi Motorsport by Ebimotors	4	8	13	**8**	6		150
3	(Netherlands) No. 909 Red Camel-Jordans.nl	7	**16**	Ret	7	**7**		112
4	(Germany) No. 930 HRT Performance	17	5		16†	13		110
4	(Germany) No. 930 TORO Racing by HRT Performance			12				110
5	(Belgium) No. 904 Red Ant Racing	22	9		11	9		78
6	(Germany) No. 907 RPM Racing	13		11	17	12		78
7	(Austria) No. 985 Neuhofer Rennsport	10		8				60
8	(Germany) No. 967 HRT Performance	19	21	Ret	Ret	18†		44
9	(Lithuania) No. 992 Porsche Baltic	20	23					22
teams ineligible for final championship positions
	(United Arab Emirates) No. 977 Rabdan Motorsport by HRT Performance			9				
	(Switzerland) No. 912 Centri Porsche Ticino	9						
Pos.	Team	(Italy) MUG	(Belgium) SPA	(Italy) MNZ	(Portugal) EST		(Spain) BAR	Pts.

==== 992-Am Drivers' ====
Pos.	Drivers	Team	(Italy) MUG	(Belgium) SPA	(Italy) MNZ	(Portugal) EST		(Spain) BAR	Pts.
1	(Germany) Philip Hamprecht (Sweden) Niclas Jönsson (United States) Tracy Krohn	(Germany) No. 907 RPM Racing	13		11	**17**	**12**		132
2	(Switzerland) Stefano Monaco (Italy) Amedeo Pampanini (Switzerland) Nicolas Stürzinger	(Germany) No. 967 HRT Performance		21	Ret	Ret	18†		60
2	(Italy) Roberto Pampanini	(Germany) No. 967 HRT Performance		21		Ret	18†		60
3	(Lithuania) Robertas Kupcikas (Lithuania) Tautvydas Rudokas	(Lithuania) No. 992 Porsche Baltic	20	23					44
drivers ineligible for final championship positions
	(Italy) Max Busnelli (Italy) Francesco Fenici (Switzerland) Ivan Jacoma (Switzerland) Valerio Presezzi	(Switzerland) No. 912 Centri Porsche Ticino	**9**						
	(Belgium) John de Wilde (Belgium) Sam Dejonghe (Belgium) Philippe Wils	(Belgium) No. 904 Red Ant Racing		9					
	(Italy) Gianluca Giorgi (Italy) Paolo Gnemmi (Italy) Gianluigi Piccioli (Italy) Paolo Venerosi	(Italy) No. 973 Ebimotors	11						
	(Belgium) Peter Guelinckx (Belgium) Bert Longin (Belgium) Stienes Longin	(Belgium) No. 924 PK Carsport		**14**					
	(Germany) Alex Reimann (Estonia) Jori Ala-Jyrä	(Estonia) No. 981 EST 1 Racing			**14**				
	(United States) Gregg Gorski (Finland) Kari-Pekka Laaksonen (Finland) Miika Panu	(Germany) No. 929 HRT Performance		18					
	(Netherlands) Bob Herber (Netherlands) Marcel van Berlo	(Germany) No. 930 HRT Performance	17						
	(United States) Matt Kehoe (Luxembourg) Carlos Rivas (United States) Tom Roberts	(Germany) No. 920 Black Falcon Team TEXTAR		20					
	(Lithuania) Andrius Šlimas (Lithuania) Paulius Žadeika	(Lithuania) No. 992 Porsche Baltic	20						
	(Belgium) Bert Redant (Belgium) Steve van Bellingen (Belgium) Tom van Rompuy (Belgium) Dirk van Rompuy	(Belgium) No. 904 Red Ant Racing	22						
	(Lithuania) Nerijus Dagilis (Lithuania) Mantas Mikuckas	(Lithuania) No. 992 Porsche Baltic		23					
	(Germany) Alexander Böhm (Germany) Axel König (Germany) Axel Sartingen (Germany) Norbert Schneider	(Germany) No. 920 Black Falcon Team TEXTAR		25					
	(Netherlands) Gjis Bessem (Netherlands) Harry Hilders	(Germany) No. 928 NKPP by HRT Performance	33†						
	(Belgium) Olivier Dons (Belgium) Rodrigue Gillion (Belgium) Kurt Hansen (Belgium) Nico Verdonck	(Belgium) No. 979 Speedlover		35					
Pos.	Drivers	Team	(Italy) MUG	(Belgium) SPA	(Italy) MNZ	(Portugal) EST		(Spain) BAR	Pts.

==== 992-Am Teams' ====
Pos.	Team	(Italy) MUG	(Belgium) SPA	(Italy) MNZ	(Portugal) EST		(Spain) BAR	Pts.
1	(Germany) No. 907 RPM Racing	13		11				72
2	(Belgium) No. 904 Red Ant Racing	22	9					60
3	(Germany) No. 967 HRT Performance		21	Ret	Ret	18†		60
4	(Lithuania) No. 992 Porsche Baltic	20	23					44
teams ineligible for final championship positions
	(Switzerland) No. 912 Centri Porsche Ticino	**9**						
	(Belgium) No. 924 PK Carsport		**14**					
	(Italy) No. 973 Ebimotors	11						
	(Estonia) No. 981 EST 1 Racing			**14**				
	(Germany) No. 929 HRT Performance		18					
	(Germany) No. 920 Black Falcon Team TEXTAR		20					
Pos.	Team	(Italy) MUG	(Belgium) SPA	(Italy) MNZ	(Portugal) EST		(Spain) BAR	Pts.

==== GT4 Drivers' ====
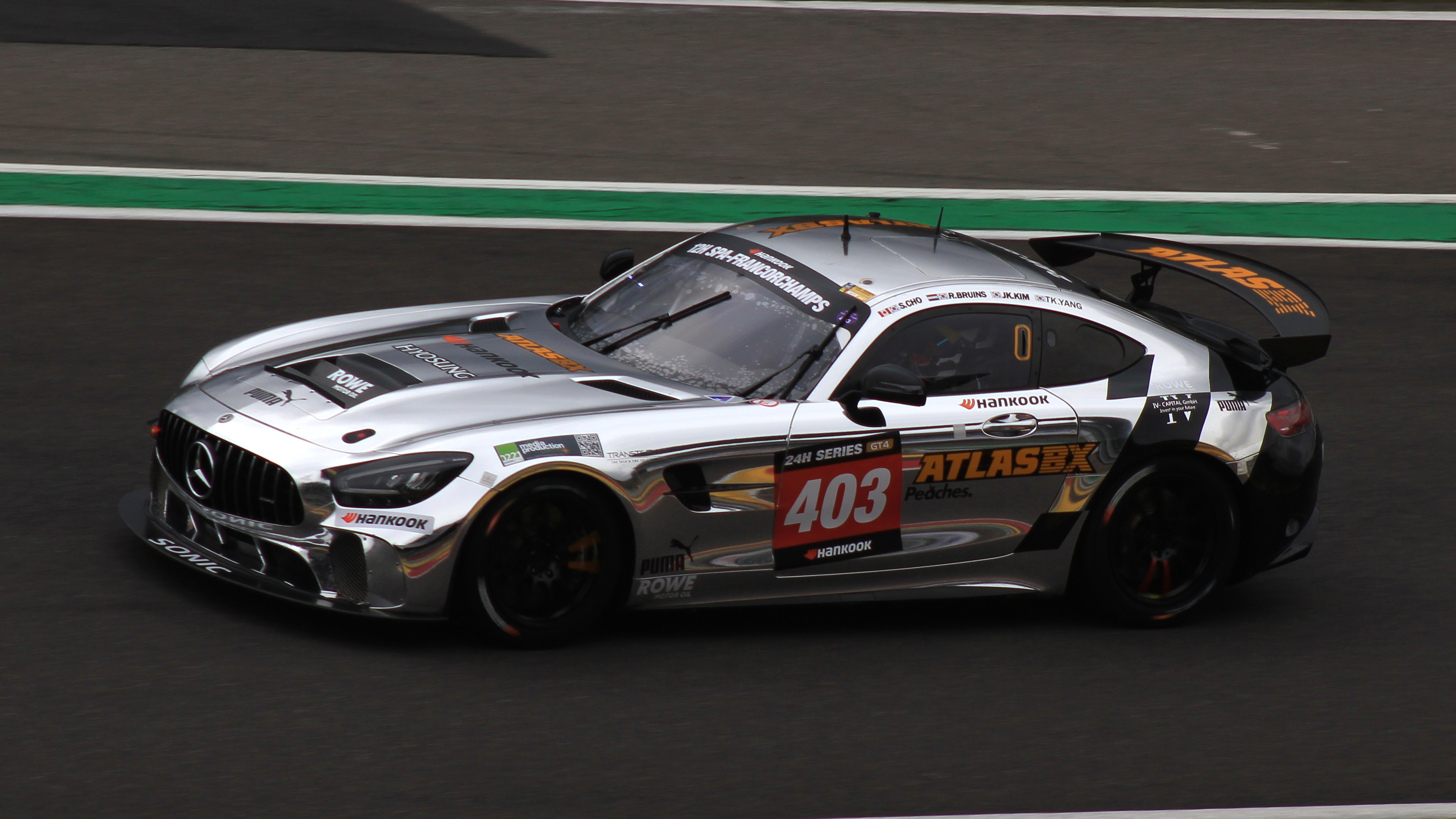
Steven Cho, Roelof Bruins, Jongkyum Kim and Atlas BX Motorsports lead the GT4 standings.

Pos.	Drivers	Team	(Italy) MUG	(Belgium) SPA	(Italy) MNZ	(Portugal) EST		(Spain) BAR	Pts.
1	(Canada) Steven Cho (Netherlands) Roelof Bruins (South Korea) Jongkyum Kim	(South Korea) No. 403 Atlas BX Motorsports	23	37	**16**	13	**10**		164
2	(Seychelles) Aliyyah Koloc (Czech Republic) Adam Lacko (Czech Republic) David Vrsecky	(United Arab Emirates) No. 416 Buggyra ZM Racing	**26**†	27	21	**14**	14†		162
3	(South Korea) Taekeun Yang	(South Korea) No. 403 Atlas BX Motorsports		37	**16**	13	**10**		124
4	(South Korea) Donggi Noh	(South Korea) No. 403 Atlas BX Motorsports			**16**	13	**10**		100
5	(Spain) Vicente Dasi (Spain) Josep Parera	(Spain) No. 418 PCR Sport		42		15	16		66
6	(Portugal) José Nuñez	(Spain) No. 418 PCR Sport				15	16		48
drivers ineligible for final championship positions
	(Belgium) Gary Terclavers (Belgium) Kenny Terclavers (Belgium) Lars Zaenen	(Belgium) No. 488 TCL Motorsport by AR Performance		30					
	(United States) Ken Goldburgs (United States) Catesby Jones (United States) Steve Weber	(United States) No. 421 Team ACP - Tangerine Associates			18				
	(United Kingdom) Carl Cavers (New Zealand) David Holloway (Cyprus) Vasily Vladykin	(United Kingdom) No. 438 Simpson Motorsport	27						
	(United States) José Garcia (Germany) Patrick Kolb (United States) Daniel Miller	(Germany) No. 427 Lionspeed GP by SRS Team Sorg Rennsport		31					
	(Belgium) Tim de Borle (Belgium) Pieter Denys (Belgium) Steven Dewulf (United Kingdom) Gavin Pickering	(Belgium) No. 408 Xwift Racing Events		36					
	(Slovakia) Tomas Erdelyi (Slovakia) Richard Gonda (Czech Republic) Robert Šenkýř (Czech Republic) Petr Svantner	(Czech Republic) No. 444 Senkyr Motorsport		**41**					
	(Spain) Jase Gleichberg	(Spain) No. 418 PCR Sport		42					
	(China) Chien Shang Chang (Hong Kong) Kwan Kit Lo (China) Qi Mi (China) Yidong Zhang	(Italy) No. 475 Autorlando Sport			Ret				
Pos.	Drivers	Team	(Italy) MUG	(Belgium) SPA	(Italy) MNZ	(Portugal) EST		(Spain) BAR	Pts.

==== GT4 Teams' ====
Pos.	Team	(Italy) MUG	(Belgium) SPA	(Italy) MNZ	(Portugal) EST		(Spain) BAR	Pts.
1	(South Korea) No. 403 Atlas BX Motorsports	23	37	**16**	13	**10**		164
2	(United Arab Emirates) No. 416 Buggyra ZM Racing	**26**†	27	21	**14**	14†		162
3	(Spain) No. 418 PCR Sport		42		15	16		66
teams ineligible for final championship positions
	(United States) No. 421 Team ACP - Tangerine Associates			18				
	(Belgium) No. 488 TCL Motorsport by AR Performance		30					
	(United Kingdom) No. 438 Simpson Motorsport	27						
	(Germany) No. 427 Lionspeed GP by SRS Team Sorg Rennsport		31					
	(Belgium) No. 408 Xwift Racing Events		36					
	(Czech Republic) No. 444 Senkyr Motorsport		**41**					
	(Italy) No. 475 Autorlando Sport			Ret				
Pos.	Team	(Italy) MUG	(Belgium) SPA	(Italy) MNZ	(Portugal) EST		(Spain) BAR	Pts.
