= Ginetta GT Championship =

- GT Championship logo as of 2026
- Category: One-make racing series by Ginetta
- Country: United Kingdom
- Inaugural season: 1996
- Constructors: (United Kingdom) Ginetta Cars
- Engine suppliers: Ford
- Tyre suppliers: Michelin
- Drivers' champion: Pro (United Kingdom) Archie Clark; Pro-Am (United Kingdom) Harry Gamble; Am (United Kingdom) Luke Shaw
- Teams' champion: Elite Motorsport
- Official website: ginetta.com

The Ginetta GT Championship, currently known as the Protyre Motorsport Ginetta GT Championship for sponsorship reasons, is a one-make racing series based in the United Kingdom. The series uses the Ginetta G56 race car and has a class system.

Supporting the British GT Championship, the series is one of three championships that Ginetta currently operate, alongside the Ginetta Junior Championship and the Ginetta GT Academy.

== Racing car ==
The championship has run Ginetta G40 and Ginetta G20 race cars in its previous iterations. In 2026, both Pro and Am classes run identical Ginetta G56 GTP8s with 6.2 L V8 engines.

== Race circuits ==
The racing circuits used in the series include:

- Brands Hatch, Kent
- Donington Park, Leicestershire
- Oulton Park, Cheshire
- Snetterton Circuit, Norfolk
- Rockingham Speedway, Northamptonshire
- Silverstone Circuit, Northamptonshire
- Cadwell Park, Lincolnshire
- Pembrey Circuit, Carmarthenshire
- Knockhill Circuit, Fife

As well as races held across British circuits, Ginetta GT Championship has also visited Zandvoort in the Netherlands.

== Championships ==
=== GT5 Challenge ===
All weekends were triple headers, thus providing 21 races throughout the season, with all races counting towards the final championship positions. The series supported both BTCC and British GT Championship rounds.

The winner of the 2012 Total Quartz Ginetta GT5 Challenge received the use of a Ginetta G50 for the 2013 Ginetta GT Supercup, whilst second overall in the Championship gained free entry into the 2013 Ginetta GT5 Challenge, with the third-placed finisher being awarded half-price entry.

=== GT Championship ===
Re-launched in 2023 as Ginetta GT Championship, the series ran three classes (GTP, GT5 Pro, and GT5 Am) in 2023, and switched to two classes (Pro and Am) from 2024. The series has run alongside British GT Championship rounds since 2023, and in 2026 runs alongside Ginetta's other series' Ginetta Junior Championship and Ginetta GT Academy.

== Champions ==
Ginetta G20 Challenge
Season	Champion				
2002	(United Kingdom) Andy Cork				
2003	(United Kingdom) Gavin Mitchell				
2004	(United Kingdom) Stewart Linn				
2005	(United Kingdom) Matt Nicoll-Jones				
2006	(United Kingdom) Stewart Linn				
2007	(United Kingdom) Matt Nicoll-Jones				
2008	(United Kingdom) Spencer McCarthy				
2009	(United Kingdom) Mark Davies				
2010	(United Kingdom) George Murrells				
Ginetta GT5 Challenge
Season	G40 Champion	G20 Champion	Team Champions		
2011	(United Kingdom) Mark Davies	(United Kingdom) Stuart Pearson	(United Kingdom) Optimum Motorsport		
2012	(United Kingdom) Sean Huyton	(United Kingdom) Matthew Flowers	(United Kingdom) Academy Motorsport		
2013	(United Kingdom) Oliver Basey-Fisher	(United Kingdom) Stuart Pearson	(United Kingdom) Academy Motorsport		
2014	(United Kingdom) George Gamble	(United Kingdom) Stuart Pearson	(United Kingdom) Total Control Racing		
2015	(United Kingdom) James Kellett		(United Kingdom) Total Control Racing		
	GT5 Pro Champion	GT5 Am Champion	Team Champions		
2016	(United Kingdom) Ollie Chadwick		(United Kingdom) Xentek Motorsport		
2017	(United Kingdom) Lewis Brown				
2018	(United Kingdom) James Kellett		(United Kingdom) Century Motorsport		
2019	(United Kingdom) Scott McKenna	(United Kingdom) Dale Albutt	(United Kingdom) Xentek Motorsport		
2020	(United Kingdom) Josh Malin	(United Kingdom) Ian Duggan	(United Kingdom) Elite Motorsport		
	GT5 Pro Champion	GT5 Am Champion	G40 Pro Champion	G40 Am Champion	Team Champions
2021	(United Kingdom) Josh Steed	(United Kingdom) Harry Mangion	(United Kingdom) Marc Warren	(United Kingdom) Rupert Laslett	(United Kingdom) Elite Motorsport
	GT5 Pro Champion	GT5 Am Champion	Team Champions		
2022	(United Kingdom) Mikey Doble (Note: Doble acquired a penalty post final race meaning Will Jenkins was appointed provisional champion, however a court hearing later in the year rescinded the penalty and reinstated Doble as champion.)	(United Kingdom) Chris White	(United Kingdom) Elite Motorsport		
Ginetta GT Championship
Season	GTP Champion	GT5 Pro Champion	GT5 Am Champion	Team Champions	
2023	(United Kingdom) Luke Reade	(United Kingdom) Luke Garlick	(United Kingdom) Bal Sidhu	(United Kingdom) Xentek Motorsport	
	Pro Champion	Pro-Am Champion	Am Champion	Team Champions	
2024	(United Kingdom) Mckenzie Douglass		(United Kingdom) Nick White	(United Kingdom) Fox Motorsport	
2025	(United Kingdom) Archie Clark	(United Kingdom) Harry Gamble	(United Kingdom) Luke Shaw	(United Kingdom) Elite Motorsport	

== See also ==
- Ginetta Cars
- Ginetta Junior Championship
- Ginetta GT4 Supercup
