= Ginetta G56 =

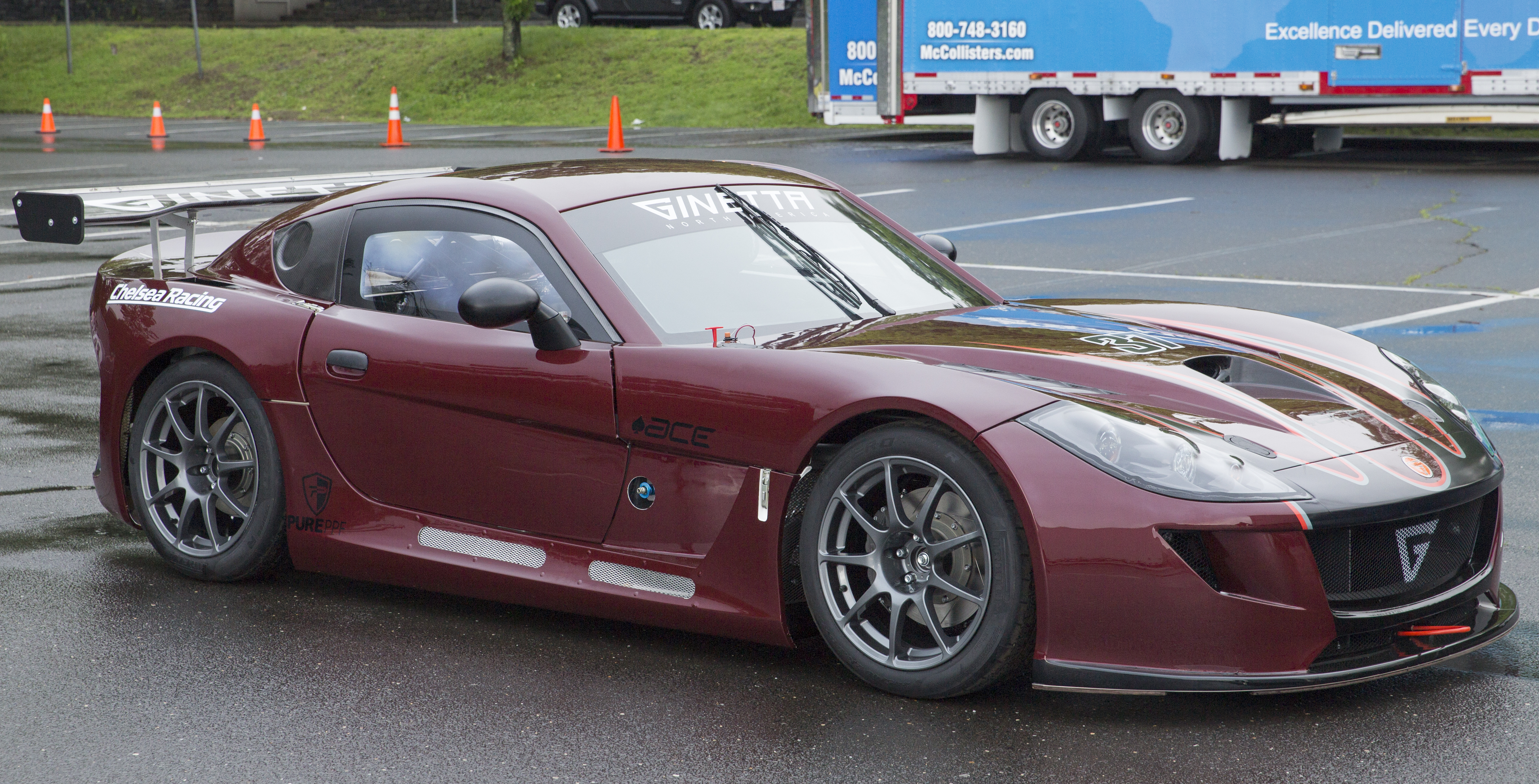

Overview
- Manufacturer: Ginetta Cars
- Model years: 2021 – present

Body and chassis
- Class: Grand tourer

Powertrain
- Engine: 3.7 L Ford Duratec 37 V6 (GTA, GT Pro); 6.2 L GM LS3 V8 (GT2, GT4, GTR, GTP8)

Chronology
- Predecessor: Ginetta G55

The Ginetta G56 is a British sportscar created by Ginetta Cars. It is the successor to Ginetta G55.

== GT4 ==
In 2021, Ginetta launched the Ginetta G56 GT4, replacing the old and highly successful Ginetta G55 GT4. The car competes primarily in the British GT Championship in the GT4 Category. The car features a Ginetta built, GM LS3 based, 6.2-litre V8 engine, with a power output of 500 bhp (373 kW).

=== GT4 Evo ===
On November 1, 2023, Ginetta unveiled the G56 GT4 EVO, designed for 2024 onward. This car is an evolution of the G56, and features updated bodywork, most notably the front bonnet, and the rear wing being changed. The car made its global racing debut at a 4-hour GT4 race in the Ultimate cup series in October 2023.

== GT2 ==
In 2025, Ginetta announced that they would be launching a GT2-spec version of the G56 later that year. This version of the G56 would be developed based on the G56 GTX version of the car.

== GTA ==
Alongside the G56 GT4, Ginetta also launched the G56 GTA, replacing the G55 GTA in its GT academy championship. The car is powered by a 270 bhp Ford Duratec 37 3.7 litre V6 engine. The car can also be upgraded to the G56 GT Pro, which has a more powerful engine. The car also doesn't feature any headlights.

== G56 GTX ==
Alongside the G56 GT4 EVO, Ginetta also debuted the Ginetta G56 GTX. This is an unrestricted version of the GT4 EVO, featuring enhanced aerodynamics, and an unrestricted version of the engine used in the GT4 version. The car made its racing debut in the 24H Series, at the 2023 12 Hours of Kuwait, taking victory in the GTX class. It would also race in the 2024 GT2 European Series as an Invitational entry during round 3 at Circuit de Spa-Francorchamps.

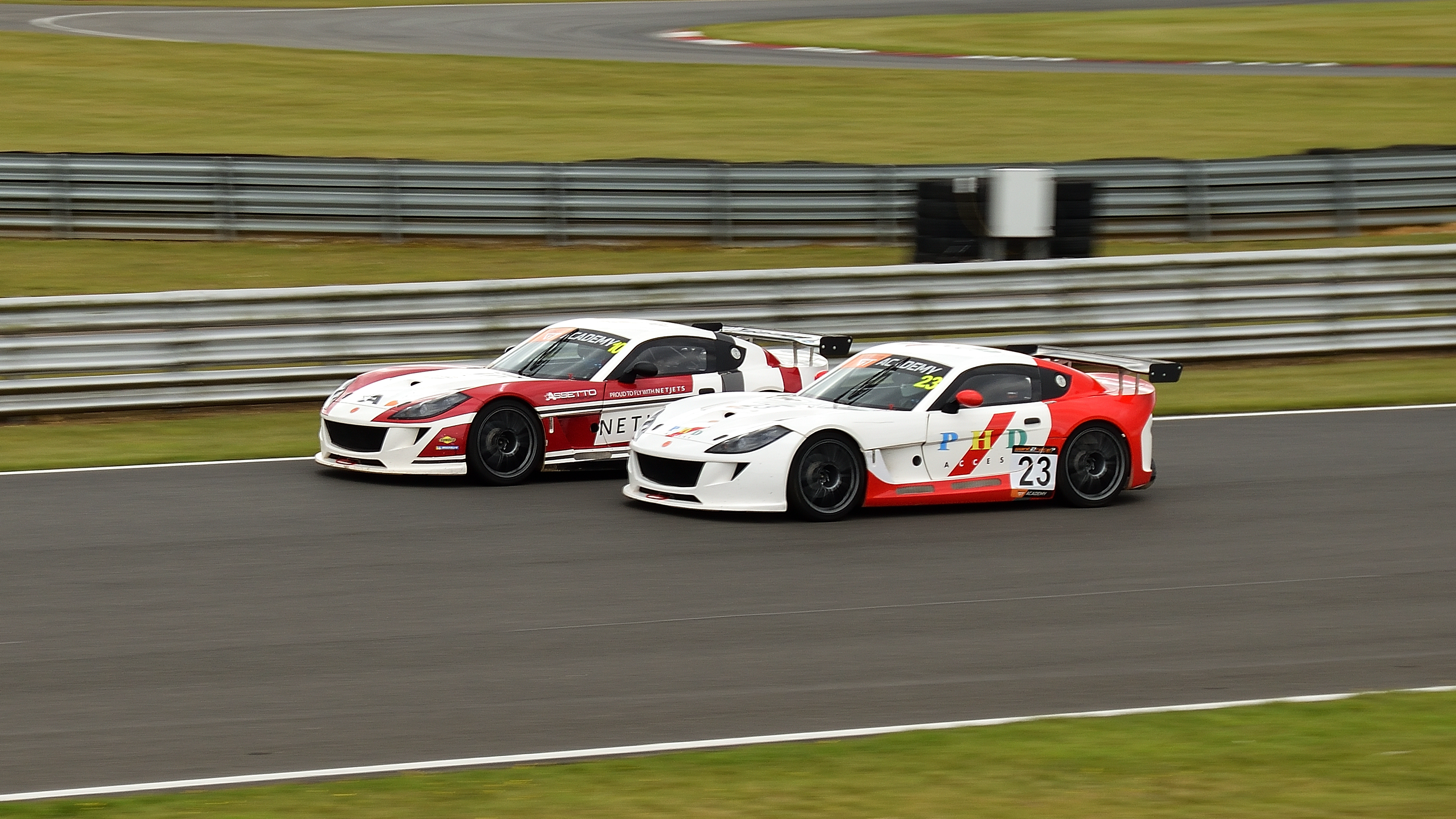
Two Ginetta G56 GTAs in the Ginetta GT Academy

== G56 GTR ==
The Ginetta G56 GTR is the road going version of the G56. It features a General Motors 6.2 litre V8 engine which gives 450 bhp, and an H-pattern Gearbox.

== G56 GTP8 ==
The Ginetta G56 GTP8 was created as a one-make racing car for the 2025 season. The V8 powered car is racing in the Ginetta GT Championship having replaced the V6 powered G56 GT Pro. The car was also added to the GT America Series in its own class for the 2026 season.
