= 2024 24 Hours of Portimão =

The layout of the Algarve International Circuit where the race was held.

The 2024 24 Hours of Portimão (formally known as the Hankook 24 Hours of Portimão) was an endurance sportscar racing held on 11 and 12 May 2024, as the third of five rounds of the 2024 24H Series. This was the sixth running of the event.

== Background ==
The event was announced on 16 October 2023 along with the rest of the 2024 24H Series calendar.

== Schedule ==
Date	Time (local: WEST)	Event	Duration
Friday, 10 May	13:30 - 15:00	Free Practice	90 Minutes
Friday, 10 May	17:00 - 17:55	Qualifying	3x15 Minutes
Friday, 10 May	20:30 - 22:00	Night Practice	90 Minutes
Saturday-Sunday, 11-12 May	12:00 - 12:00	Race	24 Hours

== Entry list ==
The entry list was revealed on 6 May 2024, and featured 22 cars: 6 GT3 cars, 10 Porsche 992 GT3 Cup cars, 1 GTX car, 4 GT4 cars, and 1 TCX car.

No.	Entrant	Car	Class	Driver 1	Driver 2	Driver 3	Driver 4	Driver 5
GT3 (6 entries)
10	(Australia) Grove Racing	Mercedes-AMG GT3 Evo	PA	(Australia) Brenton Grove	(Australia) Stephen Grove	(New Zealand) Matthew Payne	(Australia) Garth Tander	
11	(Switzerland) Hofor Racing	Mercedes-AMG GT3	Am	(Germany) Kenneth Heyer	(Switzerland) Michael Kroll	(Germany) Max Partl	(Germany) Alexander Prinz	(Switzerland) Chantal Prinz
18	(France) Saintéloc Junior Team	Audi R8 LMS Evo II	PA	(Austria) Michael Doppelmayr	(Germany) Elia Erhart	(France) Philippe Chatelet	(Germany) Pierre Kaffer	(Switzerland) Ernst Inderbitzin
90	(Spain) E2P Racing	Porsche 911 GT3 R (991.2)	PA	(Spain) Pablo Burguera	(Portugal) Álvaro Parente	(Spain) Antonio Sainero		
91	(Germany) Herberth Motorsport	Porsche 911 GT3 R (992)	Am	(Germany) Ralf Bohn	(United States) Jason Hart	(United States) Scott Noble	(United Kingdom) Ian Loggie	
92	(Germany) Herberth Motorsport	Porsche 911 GT3 R (992)	PA	(Germany) Ralf Bohn	(Germany) Vincent Kolb	(Germany) Max Moritz	(Austria) Felix Neuhofer	(Germany) Robert Renauer
GTX (1 entry)
701	(France) Vortex V8	Vortex 2.0		(France) Lionel Amrouche	(France) Philippe Bonnel	(France) Gilles Courtois	(France) Lucas Sugliano	
992 (10 entries)
902	(Denmark) Holmgaard Motorsport	Porsche 992 GT3 Cup	P	(Denmark) Jonas Holmgaard	(Denmark) Magnus Holmgaard	(France) Stéphane Perrin	(Denmark) Martin Vedel Mortensen	
903	(Belgium) Red Ant Racing	Porsche 992 GT3 Cup	P	(Belgium) Kobe de Breucker	(Belgium) Ayrton Redant	(Belgium) Yannick Redant	(Netherlands) Lucas Van Eijndhoven	
904	(Belgium) Red Ant Racing	Porsche 992 GT3 Cup	P	(Belgium) Peter Guelinckx	(Belgium) Michiel Haverans	(Belgium) Brent Verheyen	(Belgium) Kris Cools	
907	(Germany) RPM Racing	Porsche 992 GT3 Cup	Am	(Germany) Philip Hamprecht	(Sweden) Niclas Jönsson	(United States) Tracy Krohn	(Netherlands) Patrick Huisman	
908	(France) SebLajoux Racing by DUWO Racing	Porsche 992 GT3 Cup	Am	(France) Solenn Amrouche	(France) Miguel Moiola	(France) Eric Mouez	(France) Lauris Nauroy	(Belgium) Gary Terclavers
909	(Netherlands) Red Camel-Jordans.nl	Porsche 992 GT3 Cup	P	(Netherlands) Ivo Breukers	(Netherlands) Luc Breukers	(Netherlands) Rik Breukers	(Switzerland) Fabian Danz	
917	(Switzerland) Orchid Racing Team	Porsche 992 GT3 Cup	Am	(Switzerland) Antonio Garzon	(Switzerland) Daniel Gillioz	(Switzerland) Alexandre Mottet	(Switzerland) Jeremy Brodard	
963	(Switzerland) Orchid Racing Team	Porsche 992 GT3 Cup	P	(France) Laurent Misbach	(Switzerland) Loïc Villiger	(France) Antoine Leclerc	(Switzerland) Frank Villiger	
967	(Germany) HRT Performance	Porsche 992 GT3 Cup	Am	(Switzerland) Linus Diener	(Italy) Amadeo Pampanini	(Switzerland) Nicolas Stürzinger	(Switzerland) Stefano Monaco	(Germany) Kim André Hauschild
988	(Germany) MRS GT Racing	Porsche 992 GT3 Cup	Am	(Portugal) Ricardo Costa	(United States) Will Langhorne	(Germany) Marco Müller	(Hong Kong) Shaun Thong	(Hong Kong) Terence Tse
GT4 (4 entries)
405	(Lithuania) GSR Motorsport	Ginetta G56 GT4		(Lithuania) Egidijus Gelūnas	(Lithuania) Aras Kvedaras	(Lithuania) Rokas Kvedaras	(Lithuania) Ernesta Globytė	
416	(United Arab Emirates) Buggyra ZM Racing	Mercedes-AMG GT4		(Seychelles) Aliyyah Koloc	(Czech Republic) Adam Lacko	(Czech Republic) David Vrsecky	(Czech Republic) Jaroslav Janiš	
424	(Germany) Lionspeed GP	Porsche 718 Cayman GT4 RS Clubsport		(Germany) Dennis Bohn	(United States) José Garcia	(Germany) Patrick Kolb	(Switzerland) Patric Neiderhauser	
491	(France) W Autosport	Toyota GR Supra GT4		(France) Thierry Chkondali	(Switzerland) Caryl Fritsché	(France) Marc Girard	(France) Thomas Leal	(Canada) Michel Sallenbach
TCE/TCX (1 entry)
125	(France) PR-V	Peugeot 308 Racing Cup		(Germany) Christian Gloz	(France) Hervé Houdré	(France) Alain Remi	(France) Flavien Remi	

GT3 entries
Icon	Class
P	GT3-Pro
PA	GT3-Pro Am
Am	GT3-Am
992 entries
Icon	Class
P	992-Pro
Am	992-Am

== Practice ==
Class	No.	Entrant	Driver	Time
GT3	18	(France) Saintéloc Junior Team	(Germany) Pierre Kaffer	1:43.849
GTX	701	(France) Vortex V8	(France) Lionel Amrouche	1:47.997
992	909	(Netherlands) Red Camel-Jordans.nl	(Netherlands) Luc Breukers	1:47.341
GT4	424	(Germany) Lionspeed GP	(Switzerland) Patric Neiderhauser	1:54.327
TCE	125	(France) PR-V	(France) Flavien Remi	1:59.524

- Note: Only the fastest car in each class is shown.

== Night Practice ==
Class	No.	Entrant	Driver	Time
GT3	92	(Germany) Herberth Motorsport	(Germany) Robert Renauer	1:45.091
GTX	701	(France) Vortex V8	(France) Lucas Sugliano	1:50.857
992	967	(Germany) HRT Performance	(Switzerland) Stefano Monaco	1:48.294
GT4	491	(France) W Autosport	(France) Thomas Leal	1:54.808
TCE	125	(France) PR-V	(France) Flavien Remi	2:00.470

- Note: Only the fastest car in each class is shown.

== Qualifying ==
Qualifying was split into three parts. The average of the best times per qualifying session determined the starting order. Saintéloc Junior Team secured pole position with a combined average time of 1:44.921.

=== Qualifying results ===
Pole position winners in each class are marked in bold.

Pos.	Class	No.	Team	Q1	Q2	Q3	Avg
1	**GT3 Pro/Am**	**18**	**(France) Saintéloc Junior Team**	1:45.324	1:44.849	1:44.590	**1:44.921**
2	**GT3 Am**	**91**	**(Germany) Herberth Motorsport**	1:45.663	1:44.934	1:44.664	**1:45.087**
3	GT3 Pro/Am	10	(Australia) Grove Racing	1:46.380	1:44.161	1:44.771	1:45.104
4	GT3 Pro/Am	92	(Germany) Herberth Motorsport	1:46.705	1:44.862	1:44.240	1:45.269
5	GT3 Am	11	(Switzerland) Hofor Racing	1:45.015	1:45.178	1:46.782	1:45.658
6	GT3 Pro/Am	90	(Spain) E2P Racing	1:48.973	1:45.236	1:45.727	1:46.645
7	**992 Pro**	**909**	**(Netherlands) Red Camel-Jordans.nl**	1:48.658	1:47.420	1:47.802	**1:47.960**
8	**GTX**	**701**	**(France) Vortex V8**	1:47.858	1:48.864	1:47.371	**1:48.031**
9	992 Pro	903	(Belgium) Red Ant Racing	1:47.951	1:49.027	1:48.323	1:48.433
10	992 Pro	967	(Germany) HRT Performance	1:48.862	1:48.472	1:48.041	1:48.458
11	992 Pro	963	(Switzerland) Orchid Racing Team	1:50.870	1:48.002	1:48.502	1:49.124
12	**992 Am**	**907**	**(Germany) RPM Racing**	1:51.031	1:49.010	1:47.352	**1:49.131**
13	992 Pro	904	(Belgium) Red Ant Racing	1:49.482	1:49.513	1:48.980	1:49.325
14	992 Pro	902	(Denmark) Holmgaard Motorsport	1:50.229	1:49.020	1:48.958	1:49.402
15	992 Am	908	(France) SebLajoux Racing by DUWO Racing	1:50.377	1:54.099	1:50.706	1:51.727
16	**GT4**	**405**	**(Lithuania) GSR Motorsport**	1:54.740	1:54.189	1:55.388	**1:54.772**
17	GT4	416	(United Arab Emirates) Buggyra ZM Racing	1:54.493	1:55.169	1:55.154	1:54.938
18	GT4	491	(France) W Autosport	1:56.868	1:54.841	1:54.226	1:55.311
19	**TCX**	**125**	**(France) PR-V**	2:02.440	2:03.315	2:00.482	**2:02.079**
20	GT4	424	(Germany) Lionspeed GP	—	1:54.244	1:54.316	1:54.280
21	992 Am	917	(Switzerland) Orchid Racing Team	1:51.736	—	—	1:51.736
22	992 Am	988	(Germany) MRS GT Racing	2:07.415	—	—	2:07.415

== Race ==
Class winners are in bold.

Pos	Class	No	Team	Drivers	Car	Time/Reason	Laps
Pos	Class	No	Team	Drivers	Engine	Time/Reason	Laps
1	**GT3 Pro/Am**	**92**	**(Germany) Herberth Motorsport**	**(Germany) Ralf Bohn** **(Germany) Vincent Kolb** **(Germany) Max Moritz** **(Austria) Felix Neuhofer** **(Germany) Robert Renauer**	**Porsche 911 GT3 R (992)**	**24:00:24.258**	**743**
1	**GT3 Pro/Am**	**92**	**(Germany) Herberth Motorsport**	**(Germany) Ralf Bohn** **(Germany) Vincent Kolb** **(Germany) Max Moritz** **(Austria) Felix Neuhofer** **(Germany) Robert Renauer**	**Porsche M97/80 4.2 L Flat-6**	**24:00:24.258**	**743**
2	**GT3 Am**	**91**	**(Germany) Herberth Motorsport**	**(Germany) Ralf Bohn** **(United States) Jason Hart** **(United States) Scott Noble** **(United Kingdom) Ian Loggie**	**Porsche 911 GT3 R (992)**	**+2 Laps**	**741**
2	**GT3 Am**	**91**	**(Germany) Herberth Motorsport**	**(Germany) Ralf Bohn** **(United States) Jason Hart** **(United States) Scott Noble** **(United Kingdom) Ian Loggie**	**Porsche M97/80 4.2 L Flat-6**	**+2 Laps**	**741**
3	GT3 Pro/Am	18	(France) Saintéloc Junior Team	(Austria) Michael Doppelmayr (Germany) Elia Erhart (France) Philippe Chatelet (Germany) Pierre Kaffer (Germany) Swen Herberger	Audi R8 LMS Evo II	+14 Laps	729
3	GT3 Pro/Am	18	(France) Saintéloc Junior Team	(Austria) Michael Doppelmayr (Germany) Elia Erhart (France) Philippe Chatelet (Germany) Pierre Kaffer (Germany) Swen Herberger	Audi 5.2 L V10	+14 Laps	729
4	**992 Pro**	**903**	**(Belgium) Red Ant Racing**	**(Belgium) Kobe de Breucker** **(Belgium) Ayrton Redant** **(Belgium) Yannick Redant** **(Netherlands) Lucas Van Eijndhoven**	**Porsche 992 GT3 Cup**	**+19 Laps**	**724**
4	**992 Pro**	**903**	**(Belgium) Red Ant Racing**	**(Belgium) Kobe de Breucker** **(Belgium) Ayrton Redant** **(Belgium) Yannick Redant** **(Netherlands) Lucas Van Eijndhoven**	**Porsche 4.0 L Flat-6**	**+19 Laps**	**724**
5	992 Pro	904	(Belgium) Red Ant Racing	(Belgium) Peter Guelinckx (Belgium) Michiel Haverans (Belgium) Brent Verheyen (Belgium) Kris Cools	Porsche 992 GT3 Cup	+30 Laps	713
5	992 Pro	904	(Belgium) Red Ant Racing	(Belgium) Peter Guelinckx (Belgium) Michiel Haverans (Belgium) Brent Verheyen (Belgium) Kris Cools	Porsche 4.0 L Flat-6	+30 Laps	713
6	992 Pro	909	(Netherlands) Red Camel-Jordans.nl	(Netherlands) Ivo Breukers (Netherlands) Luc Breukers (Netherlands) Rik Breukers (Switzerland) Fabian Danz	Porsche 992 GT3 Cup	+35 Laps	708
6	992 Pro	909	(Netherlands) Red Camel-Jordans.nl	(Netherlands) Ivo Breukers (Netherlands) Luc Breukers (Netherlands) Rik Breukers (Switzerland) Fabian Danz	Porsche 4.0 L Flat-6	+35 Laps	708
7	992 Pro	902	(Denmark) Holmgaard Motorsport	(Denmark) Jonas Holmgaard (Denmark) Magnus Holmgaard (France) Stéphane Perrin (Denmark) Martin Vedel Mortensen	Porsche 992 GT3 Cup	+53 Laps	690
7	992 Pro	902	(Denmark) Holmgaard Motorsport	(Denmark) Jonas Holmgaard (Denmark) Magnus Holmgaard (France) Stéphane Perrin (Denmark) Martin Vedel Mortensen	Porsche 4.0 L Flat-6	+53 Laps	690
8	992 Pro	963	(Switzerland) Orchid Racing Team	(Switzerland) Loïc Villiger (France) Laurent Misbach (France) Antoine Leclerc (Switzerland) Frank Villiger	Porsche 992 GT3 Cup	+55 Laps	688
8	992 Pro	963	(Switzerland) Orchid Racing Team	(Switzerland) Loïc Villiger (France) Laurent Misbach (France) Antoine Leclerc (Switzerland) Frank Villiger	Porsche 4.0 L Flat-6	+55 Laps	688
9	**992 Am**	**907**	**(Germany) RPM Racing**	**(Germany) Philip Hamprecht** **(Sweden) Niclas Jönsson** **(United States) Tracy Krohn** **(Netherlands) Patrick Huisman**	**Porsche 992 GT3 Cup**	**+80 Laps**	**663**
9	**992 Am**	**907**	**(Germany) RPM Racing**	**(Germany) Philip Hamprecht** **(Sweden) Niclas Jönsson** **(United States) Tracy Krohn** **(Netherlands) Patrick Huisman**	**Porsche 4.0 L Flat-6**	**+80 Laps**	**663**
10	**GT4**	**416**	**(United Arab Emirates) Buggyra ZM Racing**	**(Seychelles) Aliyyah Koloc** **(Czech Republic) Adam Lacko** **(Czech Republic) David Vrsecky** **(Czech Republic) Jaroslav Janiš**	**Mercedes-AMG GT4**	**+92 Laps**	**651**
10	**GT4**	**416**	**(United Arab Emirates) Buggyra ZM Racing**	**(Seychelles) Aliyyah Koloc** **(Czech Republic) Adam Lacko** **(Czech Republic) David Vrsecky** **(Czech Republic) Jaroslav Janiš**	**Mercedes-AMG M178 4.0 L V8**	**+92 Laps**	**651**
11	GT4	491	(France) W Autosport	(France) Thierry Chkondali (Switzerland) Caryl Fritsché (France) Marc Girard (France) Thomas Leal (Canada) Michel Sallenbach	Toyota GR Supra GT4	+106 Laps	637
11	GT4	491	(France) W Autosport	(France) Thierry Chkondali (Switzerland) Caryl Fritsché (France) Marc Girard (France) Thomas Leal (Canada) Michel Sallenbach	BMW B58B30 3.0 L Twin-Turbo I6	+106 Laps	637
12	992 Am	908	(France) SebLajoux Racing by DUWO Racing	(France) Solenn Amrouche (France) Miguel Moiola (France) Eric Mouez (France) Lauris Nauroy (Belgium) Gary Terclavers	Porsche 992 GT3 Cup	+111 Laps	632
12	992 Am	908	(France) SebLajoux Racing by DUWO Racing	(France) Solenn Amrouche (France) Miguel Moiola (France) Eric Mouez (France) Lauris Nauroy (Belgium) Gary Terclavers	Porsche 4.0 L Flat-6	+111 Laps	632
13	**TCX**	**125**	**(France) PR-V**	**(Germany) Christian Gloz** **(France) Hervé Houdré** **(France) Alain Remi** **(France) Flavien Remi**	**Peugeot 308 Racing Cup**	**+142 Laps**	**601**
13	**TCX**	**125**	**(France) PR-V**	**(Germany) Christian Gloz** **(France) Hervé Houdré** **(France) Alain Remi** **(France) Flavien Remi**	**Peugeot PSA Prince 1.6 L I4**	**+142 Laps**	**601**
14	GT4	405	(Lithuania) GSR Motorsport	(Lithuania) Egidijus Gelūnas (Lithuania) Aras Kvedaras (Lithuania) Rokas Kvedaras (Lithuania) Ernesta Globytė (Lithuania) Mindaugas Liatukas	Ginetta G56 GT4	+171 Laps	572
14	GT4	405	(Lithuania) GSR Motorsport	(Lithuania) Egidijus Gelūnas (Lithuania) Aras Kvedaras (Lithuania) Rokas Kvedaras (Lithuania) Ernesta Globytė (Lithuania) Mindaugas Liatukas	GM LS3 6.2 L V8	+171 Laps	572
15	GTX	701	(France) Vortex V8	(France) Lionel Amrouche (France) Philippe Bonnel (France) Gilles Courtois (France) Lucas Sugliano	Vortex 2.0	+172 Laps	571
15	GTX	701	(France) Vortex V8	(France) Lionel Amrouche (France) Philippe Bonnel (France) Gilles Courtois (France) Lucas Sugliano	Chevrolet 6.2 L V8	+172 Laps	571
16	992 Am	988	(Germany) MRS GT Racing	(Portugal) Ricardo Costa (United States) Will Langhorne (Germany) Marco Müller (Hong Kong) Shaun Thong (Hong Kong) Terence Tse	Porsche 992 GT3 Cup	+233 Laps	510
16	992 Am	988	(Germany) MRS GT Racing	(Portugal) Ricardo Costa (United States) Will Langhorne (Germany) Marco Müller (Hong Kong) Shaun Thong (Hong Kong) Terence Tse	Porsche 4.0 L Flat-6	+233 Laps	510
17 DNF	GT3 Pro/Am	90	(Spain) E2P Racing	(Spain) Pablo Burguera (Portugal) Álvaro Parente (Spain) Antonio Sainero	Porsche 911 GT3 R (991.2)	+357 Laps	386
17 DNF	GT3 Pro/Am	90	(Spain) E2P Racing	(Spain) Pablo Burguera (Portugal) Álvaro Parente (Spain) Antonio Sainero	Porsche 4.0 L Flat-6	+357 Laps	386
18 DNF	992 Am	917	(Switzerland) Orchid Racing Team	(Switzerland) Antonio Garzon (France) Laurent Misbach (Switzerland) Alexandre Mottet (Switzerland) Jeremy Brodard	Porsche 992 GT3 Cup	+374 Laps	369
18 DNF	992 Am	917	(Switzerland) Orchid Racing Team	(Switzerland) Antonio Garzon (France) Laurent Misbach (Switzerland) Alexandre Mottet (Switzerland) Jeremy Brodard	Porsche 4.0 L Flat-6	+374 Laps	369
19 DNF	GT3 Am	11	(Switzerland) Hofor Racing	(Germany) Kenneth Heyer (Switzerland) Michael Kroll (Germany) Max Partl (Germany) Alexander Prinz (Switzerland) Chantal Prinz	Mercedes-AMG GT3	+390 Laps	353
19 DNF	GT3 Am	11	(Switzerland) Hofor Racing	(Germany) Kenneth Heyer (Switzerland) Michael Kroll (Germany) Max Partl (Germany) Alexander Prinz (Switzerland) Chantal Prinz	Mercedes-AMG M159 6.2 L V8	+390 Laps	353
20 DNF	GT3 Pro/Am	10	(Australia) Grove Racing	(Australia) Brenton Grove (Australia) Stephen Grove (New Zealand) Matthew Payne (Australia) Garth Tander	Mercedes-AMG GT3 Evo	+543 Laps	200
20 DNF	GT3 Pro/Am	10	(Australia) Grove Racing	(Australia) Brenton Grove (Australia) Stephen Grove (New Zealand) Matthew Payne (Australia) Garth Tander	Mercedes-AMG M159 6.2 L V8	+543 Laps	200
21 DNF	992 Am	967	(Germany) HRT Performance	(Switzerland) Linus Diener (Italy) Amadeo Pampanini (Switzerland) Nicolas Stürzinger (Germany) Kim André Hauschild (Switzerland) Stefano Monaco	Porsche 992 GT3 Cup	+581 Laps	162
21 DNF	992 Am	967	(Germany) HRT Performance	(Switzerland) Linus Diener (Italy) Amadeo Pampanini (Switzerland) Nicolas Stürzinger (Germany) Kim André Hauschild (Switzerland) Stefano Monaco	Porsche 4.0 L Flat-6	+581 Laps	162
22 DNF	GT4	424	(Germany) Lionspeed GP	(Germany) Dennis Bohn (United States) José Garcia (Germany) Patrick Kolb (United States) Daniel Miller	Porsche 718 Cayman GT4 RS Clubsport	+723 Laps	20
22 DNF	GT4	424	(Germany) Lionspeed GP	(Germany) Dennis Bohn (United States) José Garcia (Germany) Patrick Kolb (United States) Daniel Miller	Porsche 4.0 L Flat-6	+723 Laps	20

24H Series
Previous race: 12 Hours of Spa-Francorchamps	2024 season	Next race: 12 Hours of Misano
