= 2024 12 Hours of Misano =

The layout of the Misano World Circuit, where the race was held.

The 2024 12 Hours of Misano (formally known as the Hankook 12 Hours of Misano) was an endurance sportscar racing held on 6 July 2024, as the fourth of five rounds of the 2024 24H Series. This was the first running of the event.

== Background ==
The event was announced on 16 October 2023 along with the rest of the 2024 24H Series calendar.

== Schedule ==
Date	Time (local: CEST)	Event	Duration
Friday, 5 July	12:00 - 13:30	Free Practice	90 Minutes
Friday, 5 July	15:15 - 17:15	Qualifying	3x15 Minutes
Saturday, 6 July	10:00 - 22:00	Race	12 Hours

== Entry list ==
The entry list was revealed on 1 July 2024, and featured 27 cars: 11 GT3 cars, 9 Porsche 992 GT3 Cup cars, 1 GTX car, 4 GT4 cars, and 2 TCX cars.

No.	Entrant	Car	Class	Driver 1	Driver 2	Driver 3	Driver 4	Driver 5
GT3 (11 entries)
1	(Antigua and Barbuda) HAAS RT	Audi R8 LMS Evo II	Am	(Australia) Theo Koundouris	(Australia) Sergio Pires	(Australia) Marcel Zalloua		
8	(Switzerland) Boem by Kessel Racing	Ferrari 296 GT3	P	(Italy) Alessandro Cutrera	(Italy) Leonardo-Maria del Vecchio	(Italy) Marco Frezza	(Italy) David Fumanelli	
11	(Switzerland) Hofor Racing	Mercedes-AMG GT3	Am	(Germany) Kenneth Heyer	(Switzerland) Michael Kroll	(Germany) Max Partl	(Germany) Alexander Prinz	(Switzerland) Chantal Prinz
18	(France) Saintéloc Junior Team	Audi R8 LMS Evo II	PA	(Austria) Michael Doppelmayr	(Germany) Elia Erhart	(Germany) Swen Herberger	(Germany) Pierre Kaffer	
34	(Germany) Land Motorsport	Audi R8 LMS Evo II	Am	(Germany) Dr. Johannes Kirchhof	(Germany) Elmar Grimm	(Germany) Stefan Wieninger		
42	(New Zealand) Prime Speed Sport	Aston Martin Vantage AMR GT3 Evo	PA	(New Zealand) Earl Bamber	(New Zealand) Heremana Malmezac	(Australia) Liam Talbot		
69	(Lithuania) RD Signs - Siauliai racing team	Lamborghini Huracán GT3	Am	(Lithuania) Audrius Butkevicius	(Italy) Nicola Michelon	(Lithuania) Paulius Paskevicius	(Switzerland) Tim Müller	
71	(Lithuania) Juta Racing	Audi R8 LMS Evo II	PA	(Lithuania) Arunas Geciauskas	(Lithuania) Leonardas Dirzys	(Lithuania) Justas Jonusis	(Lithuania) Simas Juodvirsis	
74	(Poland) PTT by Schnitzelalm Racing	Mercedes-AMG GT3 Evo	Am	(Germany) Jay Mo Härtling	(Poland) Martin Kaczmarski	(Poland) Mateusz Lisowski		
90	(Spain) E2P Racing	Porsche 911 GT3 R (991.2)	PA	(Spain) Pablo Burguera	(Portugal) Álvaro Parente	(Spain) Antonio Sainero		
91	(Germany) Herberth Motorsport	Porsche 911 GT3 R (992)	Am	(Germany) Ralf Bohn	(United States) Jason Hart	(United States) Scott Noble		
GTX (1 entry)
701	(France) Vortex V8	Vortex 2.0		(France) Lionel Amrouche	(France) Philippe Bonnel	(France) Gilles Courtois		
992 (9 entries)
903	(Belgium) Red Ant Racing	Porsche 992 GT3 Cup	P	(Belgium) Kobe de Breucker	(Belgium) Ayrton Redant	(Belgium) Yannick Redant		
904	(Belgium) Red Ant Racing	Porsche 992 GT3 Cup	P	(Belgium) Peter Guelinckx	(Belgium) Michiel Haverans	(Belgium) Brent Verheyen		
907	(Germany) RPM Racing	Porsche 992 GT3 Cup	Am	(Germany) Philip Hamprecht	(Sweden) Niclas Jönsson	(United States) Tracy Krohn		
908	(France) SebLajoux Racing by DUWO Racing	Porsche 992 GT3 Cup	Am	(France) Gilles Blasco	(France) Jean-François Demorge	(France) Philippe Polette	(France) Benjamin Roy	
909	(Netherlands) Red Camel-Jordans.nl	Porsche 992 GT3 Cup	P	(Netherlands) Ivo Breukers	(Netherlands) Luc Breukers	(Netherlands) Rik Breukers	(Switzerland) Fabian Danz	
917	(Switzerland) Orchid Racing Team	Porsche 992 GT3 Cup	Am	(Switzerland) Antonio Garzon	(France) Laurent Misbach	(Switzerland) Alexandre Mottet	(Switzerland) Jeremy Brodard	
922	(Italy) Fulgenzi Racing	Porsche 992 GT3 Cup	Am	(Italy) Andrea Buratti	(Italy) Corrado Costa	(Italy) Enrico Fernando	(United States) Eric Wagner	
967	(Germany) HRT Performance	Porsche 992 GT3 Cup	Am	(Switzerland) Linus Diener	(Italy) Amadeo Pampanini	(Switzerland) Nicolas Stürzinger		
988	(Germany) MRS GT Racing	Porsche 992 GT3 Cup	Am	(Switzerland) Silvain Pastoris	(Lithuania) Mantas Janavicius	(El Salvador) Rolando Saca		
GT4 (4 entries)
407	(Belgium) Street Art Racing	Aston Martin Vantage AMR GT4		(Switzerland) Pascal Bachmann	(France) Julien Darras	(France) Jahid Fazal Karim		
416	(United Arab Emirates) Buggyra ZM Racing	Mercedes-AMG GT4		(Seychelles) Aliyyah Koloc	(Czech Republic) Adam Lacko	(Czech Republic) David Vrsecky		
419	(Belgium) Hamofa Motorsport	BMW M4 GT4 Gen II		(Belgium) Kris Verhoeven	(Belgium) Mark Verhoeven	(Belgium) Rob Verhoeven		
424	(Germany) Lionspeed GP	Porsche 718 Cayman GT4 RS Clubsport		(Germany) Dennis Bohn	(United States) José Garcia	(Germany) Patrick Kolb		
TCX (2 entries)
111	(Germany) SR Motorsport	Porsche 718 Cayman GT4 Clubsport		(Germany) Michael Sander	(Germany) Wilhelm Kühne	(Germany) Tim Neuser		
178	(United Kingdom) CWS Engineering	Ginetta G55 Supercup		(United Kingdom) Daniel Morris	(United Kingdom) Colin White			

GT3 entries
Icon	Class
P	GT3-Pro
PA	GT3-Pro Am
Am	GT3-Am
992 entries
Icon	Class
P	992-Pro
Am	992-Am

== Practice ==
The first and only practice session started on 12:00 CEST on Friday. Mateusz Lisowski ended up quickest in the No. 74 PTT by Schnitzelalm Racing Mercedes-AMG, with a lap time of 1:34.867. Earl Bamber was second-quickest in the No. 42 Prime Speed Sport Aston Martin. Third-quickest was Pierre Kaffer in the No. 18 Saintéloc Junior Team Audi.

Class	No.	Entrant	Driver	Time
GT3	74	(Poland) PTT by Schnitzelalm Racing	(Poland) Mateusz Lisowski	1:34.867
GTX	—			
992	907	(Germany) RPM Racing	(Germany) Philip Hamprecht	1:37.928
GT4	424	(Germany) Lionspeed GP	(Germany) Patrick Kolb	1:44.615
TCE	178	(United Kingdom) CWS Engineering	(United Kingdom) Daniel Morris	1:45.918

- Note: Only the fastest car in each class is shown.

== Qualifying ==
Qualifying was split into three parts. The average of the best times per qualifying session determined the starting order. PTT by Schnitzelalm Racing secured pole position with a combined average time of 1:35.041. Herberth Motorsport and Hofor Racing qualified 2nd and 3rd respectively.

=== Qualifying results ===
Pole position winners in each class are marked in bold.

Pos.	Class	No.	Team	Q1	Q2	Q3	Avg
1	**GT3 Am**	**74**	**(Poland) PTT by Schnitzelalm Racing**	1:35.772	1:34.671	1:34.682	**1:35.041**
2	GT3 Am	91	(Germany) Herberth Motorsport	1:36.189	1:35.244	1:34.526	1:35.319
3	GT3 Am	11	(Switzerland) Hofor Racing	1:34.850	1:35.615	1:35.545	1:35.336
4	**GT3 Pro/Am**	**18**	**(France) Saintéloc Junior Team**	1:36.507	1:35.281	1:34.607	**1:35.465**
5	**GT3 Pro**	**8**	**(Switzerland) Boem by Kessel Racing**	1:37.943	1:35.096	1:34.269	**1:35.769**
6	GT3 Pro/Am	71	(Lithuania) Juta Racing	1:35.7 40	1:35.9 29	1:36.971	1:36.213
7	GT3 Pro/Am	42	(New Zealand) Prime Speed Sport	1:37.5 50	1:36.6 30	1:35.171	1:36.450
8	GT3 Pro/Am	90	(Spain) E2P Racing	1:39.249	1:36.213	1:35.440	1:36.967
9	GT3 Am	69	(Lithuania) RD Signs - Siauliai racing team	1:37.832	1:36.153	1:37.501	1:37.162
10	GT3 Am	1	(Antigua and Barbuda) HAAS RT	1:36.285	1:37.717	1:38.054	1:37.352
11	GT3 Am	34	(Germany) Land Motorsport	1:39.014	1:37.827	1:37.379	1:38.073
12	**992 Pro**	**903**	**(Belgium) Red Ant Racing**	1:38.888	1:38.215	1:38.478	**1:38.527**
13	992 Pro	904	(Belgium) Red Ant Racing	1:39.667	1:38.545	1:38.761	1:38.991
14	992 Pro	909	(Netherlands) Red Camel-Jordans.nl	1:40.225	1:38.782	1:39.323	1:39.443
15	**992 Am**	**907**	**(Germany) RPM Racing**	1:41.888	1:38.892	1:37.995	**1:39.591**
16	992 Am	967	(Germany) HRT Performance	1:39.951	1:40.017	1:40.031	1:39.999
17	992 Am	922	(Italy) Fulgenzi Racing	1:39.700	1:42.306	1:40.928	1:40.978
18	992 Am	988	(Germany) MRS GT Racing	1:40.150	1:42.104	1:41.849	1:41.367
19	**GTX**	**701**	**(France) Vortex V8**	1:43.258	1:39.819	1:45.302	**1:42.793**
20	992 Am	917	(Switzerland) Orchid Racing Team	1:41.002	1:43.440	1:44.778	1:43.073
21	992 Am	908	(France) SebLajoux Racing by DUWO Racing	1:41.234	1:42.227	1:45.930	1:43.130
22	**GT4**	**407**	**(Belgium) Street Art Racing**	1:44.904	1:45.421	1:43.945	**1:44.756**
23	GT4	419	(Belgium) Hamofa Motorsport	1:46.164	1:44.344	1:43.811	1:44.773
24	GT4	416	(United Arab Emirates) Buggyra ZM Racing	1:46.008	1:44.521	1:45.201	1:45.243
25	**TCX**	**178**	**(United Kingdom) CWS Racing**	1:45.621	1:44.681	1:46.871	**1:45.724**
26	GT4	424	(Germany) Lionspeed GP	1:49.030	1:46.049	1:45.388	1:46.822
27	TCX	111	(Germany) SR Motorsport	1:47.251	1:45.416	1:48.715	1:47127

== Race ==
=== Race results ===
Class winners are in bold.

Pos	Class	No	Team	Drivers	Car	Time/Reason	Laps
Pos	Class	No	Team	Drivers	Engine	Time/Reason	Laps
1	**GT3 Pro/Am**	**18**	**(France) Saintéloc Junior Team**	**(Austria) Michael Doppelmayr** **(Germany) Elia Erhart** **(Germany) Swen Herberger** **(Germany) Pierre Kaffer**	**Audi R8 LMS Evo II**	**12:00:48.050**	**401**
1	**GT3 Pro/Am**	**18**	**(France) Saintéloc Junior Team**	**(Austria) Michael Doppelmayr** **(Germany) Elia Erhart** **(Germany) Swen Herberger** **(Germany) Pierre Kaffer**	**Audi 5.2 L V10**	**12:00:48.050**	**401**
2 DNF	GT3 Pro/Am	71	(Lithuania) Juta Racing	(Lithuania) Arunas Geciauskas (Lithuania) Leonardas Dirzys (Lithuania) Justas Jonusis (Lithuania) Simas Juodvirsis	Audi R8 LMS Evo II	+6 Laps	395
2 DNF	GT3 Pro/Am	71	(Lithuania) Juta Racing	(Lithuania) Arunas Geciauskas (Lithuania) Leonardas Dirzys (Lithuania) Justas Jonusis (Lithuania) Simas Juodvirsis	Audi 5.2 L V10	+6 Laps	395
3	**992 Am**	**922**	**(Italy) Fulgenzi Racing**	**(Italy) Andrea Buratti** **(Italy) Corrado Costa** **(Italy) Enrico Fernando** **(United States) Eric Wagner**	**Porsche 992 GT3 Cup**	**+16 Laps**	**385**
3	**992 Am**	**922**	**(Italy) Fulgenzi Racing**	**(Italy) Andrea Buratti** **(Italy) Corrado Costa** **(Italy) Enrico Fernando** **(United States) Eric Wagner**	**Porsche 4.0 L Flat-6**	**+16 Laps**	**385**
4	992 Am	907	(Germany) RPM Racing	(Germany) Philip Hamprecht (Sweden) Niclas Jönsson (United States) Tracy Krohn	Porsche 992 GT3 Cup	+18 Laps	383
4	992 Am	907	(Germany) RPM Racing	(Germany) Philip Hamprecht (Sweden) Niclas Jönsson (United States) Tracy Krohn	Porsche 4.0 L Flat-6	+18 Laps	383
5	992 Am	917	(Switzerland) Orchid Racing Team	(Switzerland) Antonio Garzon (France) Laurent Misbach (Switzerland) Alexandre Mottet (Switzerland) Jeremy Brodard	Porsche 992 GT3 Cup	+26 Laps	375
5	992 Am	917	(Switzerland) Orchid Racing Team	(Switzerland) Antonio Garzon (France) Laurent Misbach (Switzerland) Alexandre Mottet (Switzerland) Jeremy Brodard	Porsche 4.0 L Flat-6	+26 Laps	375
6	**GT3 Am**	**34**	**(Germany) Land Motorsport**	**(Germany) Stefan Wieninger** **(Germany) Elmar Grimm** **(Germany) Dr. Johannes Kirchhoff**	**Audi R8 LMS Evo II**	**+30 Laps**	**371**
6	**GT3 Am**	**34**	**(Germany) Land Motorsport**	**(Germany) Stefan Wieninger** **(Germany) Elmar Grimm** **(Germany) Dr. Johannes Kirchhoff**	**Audi 5.2 L V10**	**+30 Laps**	**371**
7	**GT4**	**416**	**(United Arab Emirates) Buggyra ZM Racing**	**(Seychelles) Aliyyah Koloc** **(Czech Republic) Adam Lacko** **(Czech Republic) David Vrsecky**	**Mercedes-AMG GT4**	**+31 Laps**	**370**
7	**GT4**	**416**	**(United Arab Emirates) Buggyra ZM Racing**	**(Seychelles) Aliyyah Koloc** **(Czech Republic) Adam Lacko** **(Czech Republic) David Vrsecky**	**Mercedes-AMG M178 4.0 L V8**	**+31 Laps**	**370**
8	GT3 Am	69	(Lithuania) RD Signs - Siauliai racing team	(Lithuania) Audrius Butkevicius (Italy) Nicola Machelon (Lithuania) Paulius Paskevicius (Switzerland) Tim Müller	Lamborghini Huracán GT3	+32 Laps	369
8	GT3 Am	69	(Lithuania) RD Signs - Siauliai racing team	(Lithuania) Audrius Butkevicius (Italy) Nicola Machelon (Lithuania) Paulius Paskevicius (Switzerland) Tim Müller	Lamborghini DGF 5.2 L V10	+32 Laps	369
9 DNF	GT3 Am	11	(Switzerland) Hofor Racing	(Germany) Kenneth Heyer (Switzerland) Michael Kroll (Germany) Max Partl (Germany) Alexander Prinz (Switzerland) Chantal Prinz	Mercedes-AMG GT3	+38 Laps	363
9 DNF	GT3 Am	11	(Switzerland) Hofor Racing	(Germany) Kenneth Heyer (Switzerland) Michael Kroll (Germany) Max Partl (Germany) Alexander Prinz (Switzerland) Chantal Prinz	Mercedes-AMG M159 6.2 L V8	+38 Laps	363
10	992 Am	967	(Germany) HRT Performance	(Switzerland) Linus Diener (Italy) Amadeo Pampanini (Switzerland) Nicolas Stürzinger	Porsche 992 GT3 Cup	+45 Laps	356
10	992 Am	967	(Germany) HRT Performance	(Switzerland) Linus Diener (Italy) Amadeo Pampanini (Switzerland) Nicolas Stürzinger	Porsche 4.0 L Flat-6	+45 Laps	356
11	**TCX**	**111**	**(Germany) SR Motorsport**	**(Germany) Michael Sander** **(Germany) Wilhelm Kühne** **(Germany) Tim Neuser**	**Porsche 718 Cayman GT4 Clubsport**	**+50 Laps**	**351**
11	**TCX**	**111**	**(Germany) SR Motorsport**	**(Germany) Michael Sander** **(Germany) Wilhelm Kühne** **(Germany) Tim Neuser**	**Porsche 3.8 L Flat-6**	**+50 Laps**	**351**
12 DNF	992 Am	908	(France) SebLajoux Racing by DUWO Racing	(France) Gilles Blasco (France) Jean-François Demorge (France) Philippe Polette (France) Benjamin Roy	Porsche 992 GT3 Cup	+55 Laps	346
12 DNF	992 Am	908	(France) SebLajoux Racing by DUWO Racing	(France) Gilles Blasco (France) Jean-François Demorge (France) Philippe Polette (France) Benjamin Roy	Porsche 4.0 L Flat-6	+55 Laps	346
13	GT3 Am	91	(Germany) Herberth Motorsport	(Germany) Ralf Bohn (United States) Jason Hart (United States) Scott Noble	Porsche 911 GT3 R (992)	+59 Laps	342
13	GT3 Am	91	(Germany) Herberth Motorsport	(Germany) Ralf Bohn (United States) Jason Hart (United States) Scott Noble	Porsche M97/80 4.2 L Flat-6	+59 Laps	342
14	GT3 Pro/Am	42	(New Zealand) Prime Speed Sport	(New Zealand) Earl Bamber (New Zealand) Heremana Malmezac (Australia) Liam Talbot	Aston Martin Vantage AMR GT3 Evo	+66 Laps	335
14	GT3 Pro/Am	42	(New Zealand) Prime Speed Sport	(New Zealand) Earl Bamber (New Zealand) Heremana Malmezac (Australia) Liam Talbot	Aston Martin M177 4.0 L Turbo V8	+66 Laps	335
15	TCX	178	(United Kingdom) CWS Engineering	(United Kingdom) Daniel Morris (United Kingdom) Colin White	Ginetta G55 Supercup	+71 Laps	330
15	TCX	178	(United Kingdom) CWS Engineering	(United Kingdom) Daniel Morris (United Kingdom) Colin White	Ford Cyclone 3.7 L V6	+71 Laps	330
16 DNF	GT3 Am	1	(Antigua and Barbuda) HAAS RT	(Australia) Theo Koundouris (Australia) Sergio Pires (Australia) Marcel Zalloua	Audi R8 LMS Evo II	+82 Laps	319
16 DNF	GT3 Am	1	(Antigua and Barbuda) HAAS RT	(Australia) Theo Koundouris (Australia) Sergio Pires (Australia) Marcel Zalloua	Audi 5.2 L V10	+82 Laps	319
17 DNF	GT3 Am	74	(Poland) PTT by Schnitzelalm Racing	(Germany) Jay Mo Härtling (Poland) Martin Kaczmarski (Poland) Mateusz Lisowski	Mercedes-AMG GT3	+101 Laps	300
17 DNF	GT3 Am	74	(Poland) PTT by Schnitzelalm Racing	(Germany) Jay Mo Härtling (Poland) Martin Kaczmarski (Poland) Mateusz Lisowski	Mercedes-AMG M159 6.2 L V8	+101 Laps	300
18 DNF	992 Am	988	(Germany) MRS GT Racing	(Switzerland) Silvain Pastoris (Lithuania) Mantas Janavicius (El Salvador) Rolando Saca	Porsche 992 GT3 Cup	+115 Laps	286
18 DNF	992 Am	988	(Germany) MRS GT Racing	(Switzerland) Silvain Pastoris (Lithuania) Mantas Janavicius (El Salvador) Rolando Saca	Porsche 4.0 L Flat-6	+115 Laps	286
19	GT4	424	(Germany) Lionspeed GP	(Germany) Dennis Bohn (United States) José Garcia (Germany) Patrick Kolb	Porsche 718 Cayman GT4 RS Clubsport	+118 Laps	283
19	GT4	424	(Germany) Lionspeed GP	(Germany) Dennis Bohn (United States) José Garcia (Germany) Patrick Kolb	Porsche 4.0 L Flat-6	+118 Laps	283
20 DNF	**GTX**	**701**	**(France) Vortex V8**	**(France) Lionel Amrouche** **(France) Philippe Bonnel** **(France) Gilles Courtois**	**Vortex 2.0**	**+129 Laps**	**272**
20 DNF	**GTX**	**701**	**(France) Vortex V8**	**(France) Lionel Amrouche** **(France) Philippe Bonnel** **(France) Gilles Courtois**	**Chevrolet 6.2 L V8**	**+129 Laps**	**272**
21 DNF	GT3 Pro/Am	90	(Spain) E2P Racing	(Spain) Pablo Burguera (Portugal) Álvaro Parente (Spain) Antonio Sainero	Porsche 911 GT3 R (991.2)	+131 Laps	270
21 DNF	GT3 Pro/Am	90	(Spain) E2P Racing	(Spain) Pablo Burguera (Portugal) Álvaro Parente (Spain) Antonio Sainero	Porsche 4.0 L Flat-6	+131 Laps	270
22 DNF	GT4	407	(Belgium) Street Art Racing	(Switzerland) Pascal Bachmann (France) Julien Darras (France) Jahid Fazal Karim	Aston Martin Vantage AMR GT4	+192 Laps	209
22 DNF	GT4	407	(Belgium) Street Art Racing	(Switzerland) Pascal Bachmann (France) Julien Darras (France) Jahid Fazal Karim	Aston Martin M177 4.0 L Twin-Turbo V8	+192 Laps	209
23 DNF	**992 Pro**	**904**	**(Belgium) Red Ant Racing**	**(Belgium) Peter Guelinckx** **(Belgium) Michiel Haverans** **(Belgium) Brent Verheyen**	**Porsche 992 GT3 Cup**	**+197 Laps**	**204**
23 DNF	**992 Pro**	**904**	**(Belgium) Red Ant Racing**	**(Belgium) Peter Guelinckx** **(Belgium) Michiel Haverans** **(Belgium) Brent Verheyen**	**Porsche 4.0 L Flat-6**	**+197 Laps**	**204**
24 DNF	GT4	419	(Belgium) Hamofa Motorsport	(Belgium) Kris Verhoeven (Belgium) Mark Verhoeven (Belgium) Rob Verhoeven	BMW M4 GT4 Gen II	+258 Laps	143
24 DNF	GT4	419	(Belgium) Hamofa Motorsport	(Belgium) Kris Verhoeven (Belgium) Mark Verhoeven (Belgium) Rob Verhoeven	BMW N55 3.0 L Twin-turbo I6	+258 Laps	143
25 DNF	GT3 Pro	8	(Switzerland) Boem by Kessel Racing	(Italy) Alessandro Cutrera (Italy) Leonardo-Maria del Vecchio (Italy) Marco Frezza (Italy) David Fumanelli	Ferrari 296 GT3	+287 Laps	114
25 DNF	GT3 Pro	8	(Switzerland) Boem by Kessel Racing	(Italy) Alessandro Cutrera (Italy) Leonardo-Maria del Vecchio (Italy) Marco Frezza (Italy) David Fumanelli	Ferrari F163 3.0 L Twin-turbo V6	+287 Laps	114
26 DNF	992 Pro	903	(Belgium) Red Ant Racing	(Belgium) Kobe de Breucker (Belgium) Ayrton Redant (Belgium) Yannick Redant	Porsche 992 GT3 Cup	+307 Laps	94
26 DNF	992 Pro	903	(Belgium) Red Ant Racing	(Belgium) Kobe de Breucker (Belgium) Ayrton Redant (Belgium) Yannick Redant	Porsche 4.0 L Flat-6	+307 Laps	94
27 DNS	992 Pro	909	(Netherlands) Red Camel-Jordans.nl	(Netherlands) Ivo Breukers (Netherlands) Luc Breukers (Netherlands) Rik Breukers (Switzerland) Fabian Danz	Porsche 992 GT3 Cup	Did not start	0
27 DNS	992 Pro	909	(Netherlands) Red Camel-Jordans.nl	(Netherlands) Ivo Breukers (Netherlands) Luc Breukers (Netherlands) Rik Breukers (Switzerland) Fabian Danz	Porsche 4.0 L Flat-6	Did not start	0

24H Series
Previous race: 24 Hours of Portimão	2024 season	Next race: 24 Hours of Barcelona
