= Volkswagen Group MMB platform =

Overview
- Manufacturer: Volkswagen Group
- Production: 2016–present

Body and chassis
- Class: Grand tourer (S)
- Layout: Longitudinal rear mid-engine, rear-wheel-drive; Rear-engine, rear-wheel drive; Rear-engine, all-wheel drive

The Volkswagen Group MMB platform (Modularer Mittelmotor Baukasten) is the company's strategy for shared modular design construction of its rear mid-engined or rear-engined sports cars. It was developed by Porsche and it has been in use since 2016, having been introduced with the Porsche 982.

== MMB-based models ==
=== Models ===
- Porsche 982 (2016–present)
- Porsche 992 (2019–present)
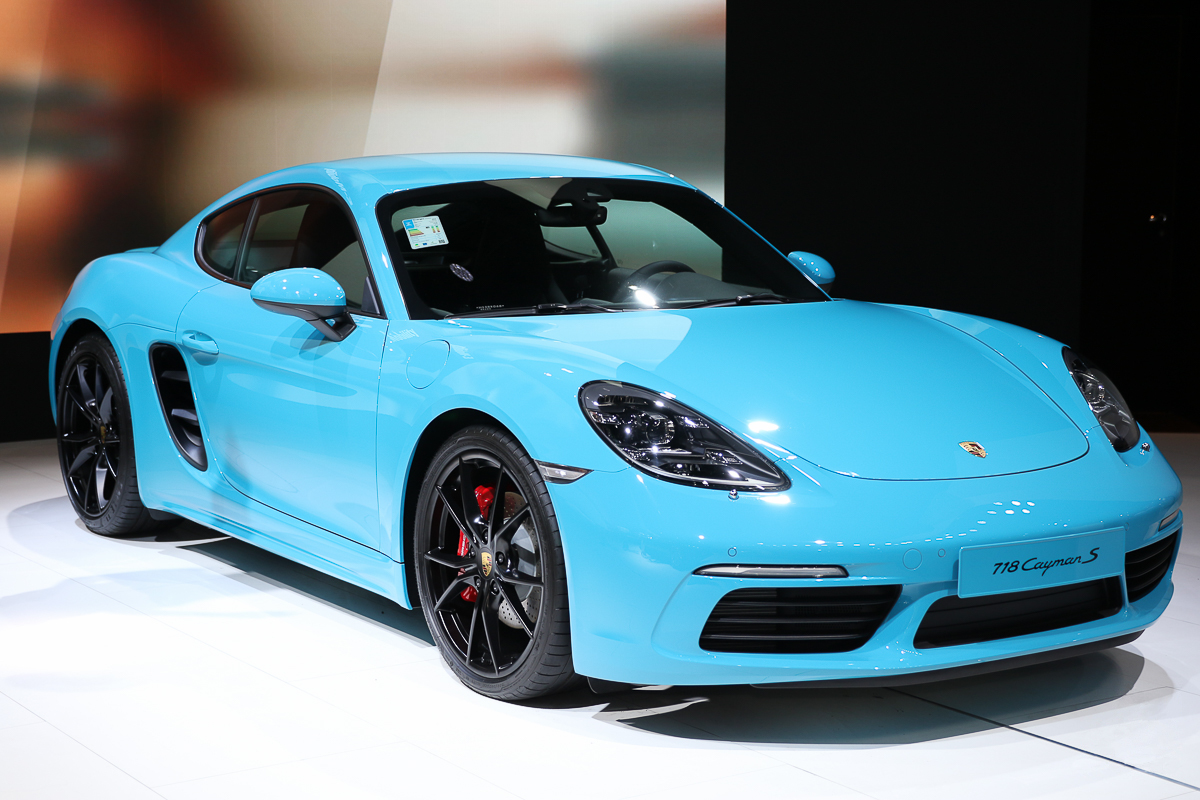
Porsche 718 Cayman S 982

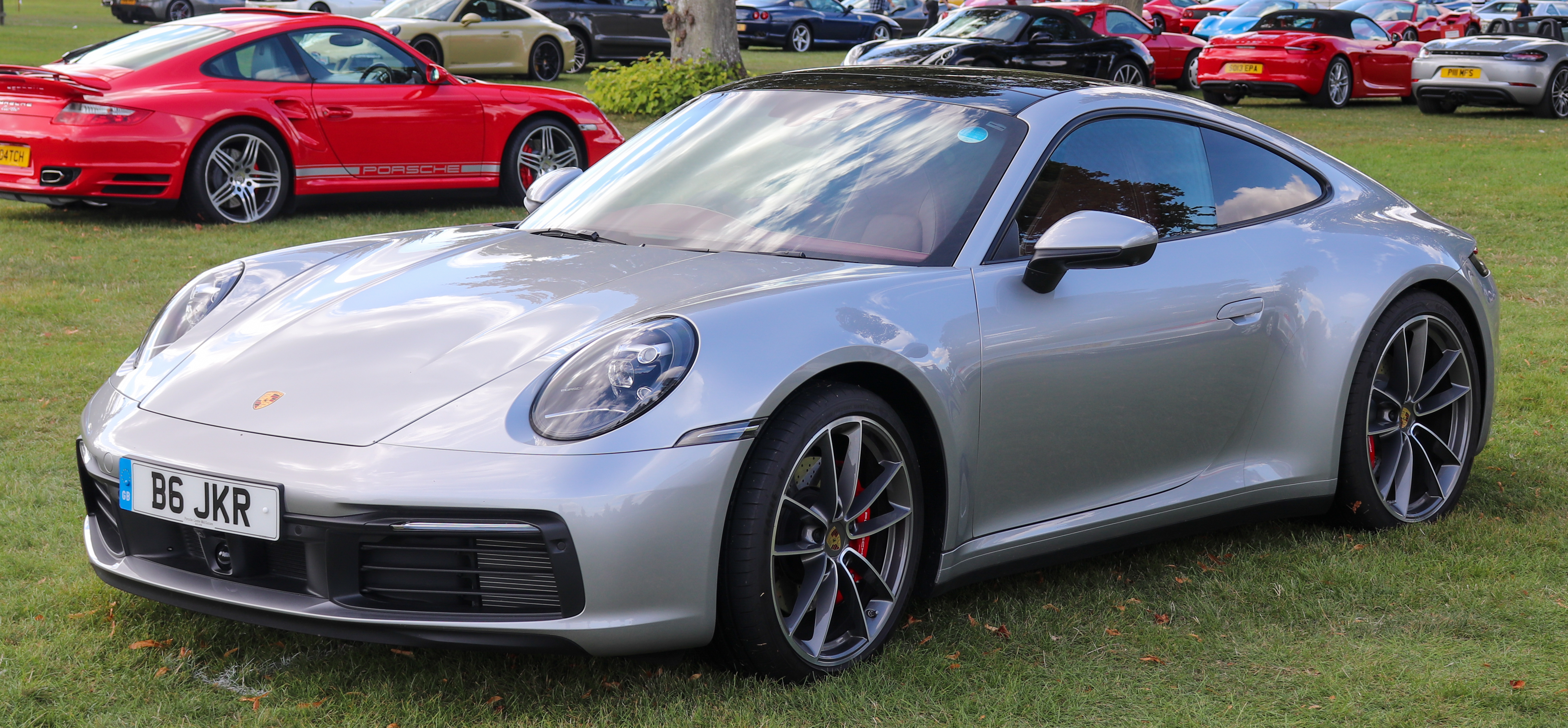
Porsche 911 Carrera S 992

== See also ==
- Volkswagen Group MSB platform
- List of Volkswagen Group platforms
