= Porsche 718 Boxster and Cayman (982) =

Fourth generation of the Boxster and third generation of the Cayman sports cars

Porsche 982
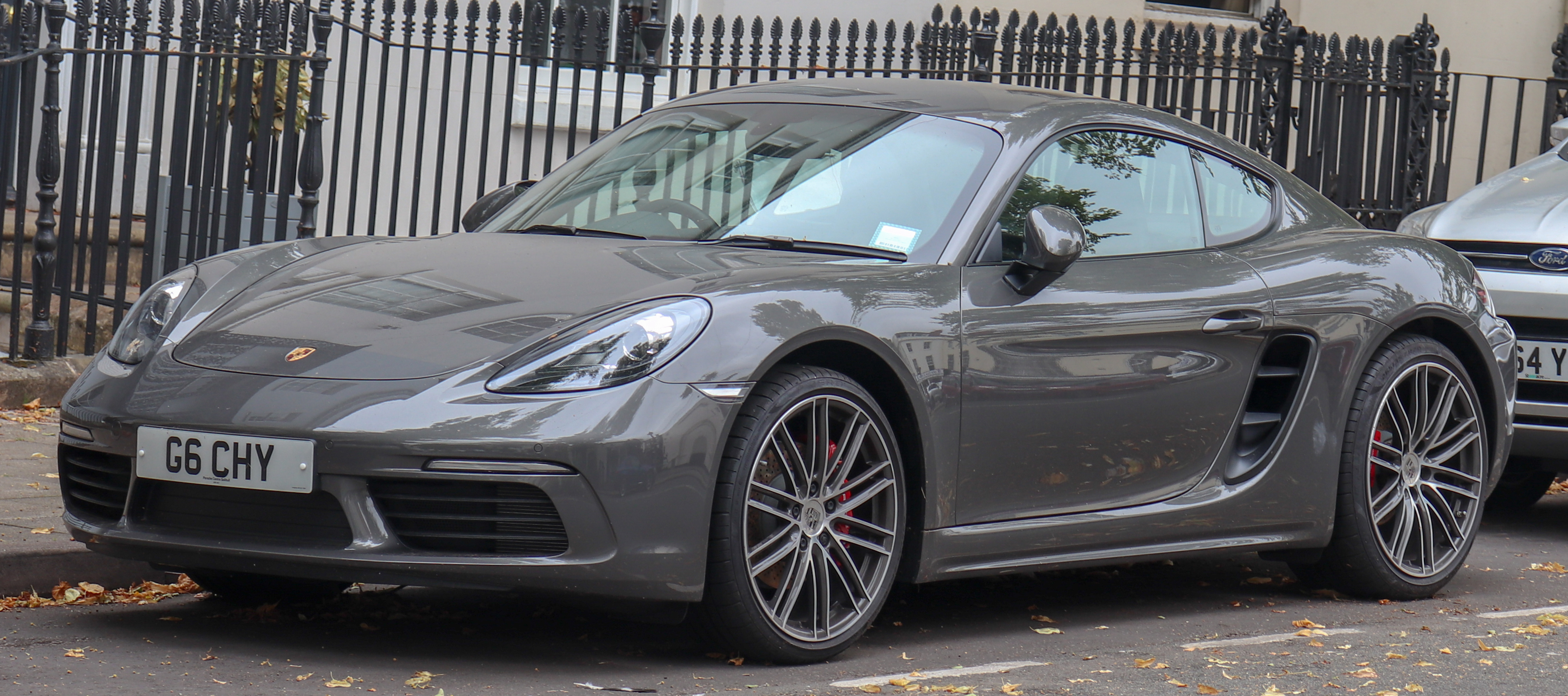
- Porsche 718 Cayman S

Overview
- Manufacturer: Porsche
- Also called: Porsche 718 Boxster; Porsche 718 Cayman; Porsche 718 Spyder
- Production: 2016–2025
- Assembly: Germany: Stuttgart; Germany: Osnabrück
- Designer: Peter Varga (2015); Fabian Schmölz (GT4, 2018)

Body and chassis
- Class: Sports car (S)
- Body style: 2-door roadster (718 Boxster / Spyder); 2-door fastback coupé (718 Cayman)
- Layout: MR layout
- Platform: MMB (Modular mid-engine platform)

Powertrain
- Engine: 2.0 L MA2.2 turbo flat-4; 2.5 L MA2.22 turbo flat-4; 4.0 L MDG flat-6
- Transmission: 6-speed G82.00 manual; 7-speed PDK dual-clutch auto

Dimensions
- Wheelbase: Boxster: 2,475 mm (97.4 in); Cayman: 2,475 mm (97.4 in)
- Length: Boxster: 4,379 mm (172.4 in); Cayman: 4,379 mm (172 in)
- Width: Boxster: 1,801 mm (70.9 in); Cayman: 1,801 mm (70.9 in)
- Height: Boxster: 1,281 mm (50.4 in); Cayman: 1,295 mm (51.0 in)
- Curb weight: Boxster/Cayman: 1,335 kg (2,943 lb) (manual); 1,370 kg (3,020 lb) (PDK); Boxster S/Cayman S: 1,355 kg (2,987 lb) (manual); 1,385 kg (3,053 lb) (PDK); Boxster GTS/Cayman GTS: 1,375 kg (3,031 lb) (manual); 1,405 kg (3,097 lb) (PDK); 718 Cayman GT4: 1,451 kg (3,199 lb); 718 Spyder: 1,454 kg (3,206 lb)

Chronology
- Predecessor: Porsche 981

Logo of the 718 series.

The Porsche 982 is the internal designation of the fourth generation Boxster/Cayman (third generation Cayman) made by German automobile manufacturer Porsche. With the switch to a new turbocharged flat-four engine the marketing name for the models was changed to Porsche 718, in reference to the 718, which won the Targa Florio race in 1959 and 1960. The name is meant to evoke Porsche's past racing successes with light cars like the 718 that outmaneuvered competitors with larger and more powerful engines.

== 718 Boxster and Cayman ==
=== 718 Boxster and Cayman / 718 Boxster and Cayman S ===
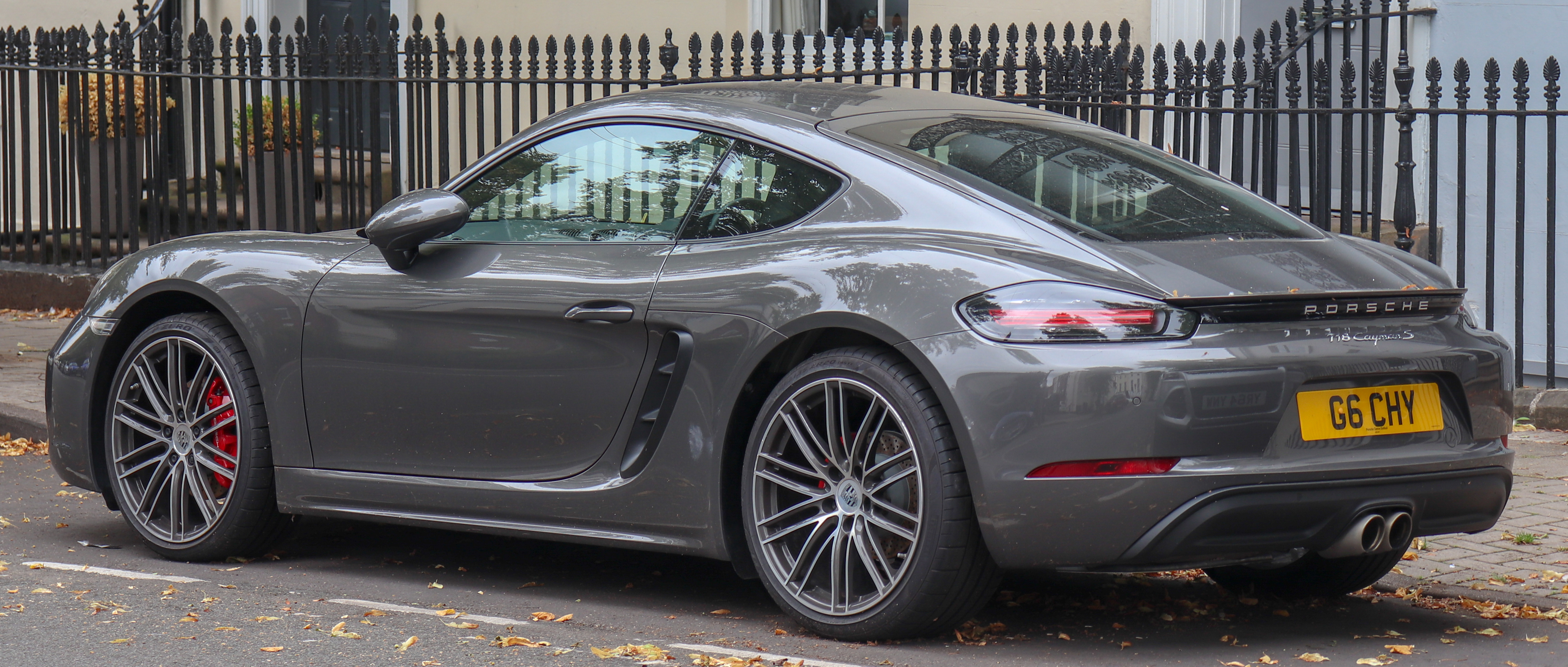
Rear (Cayman)

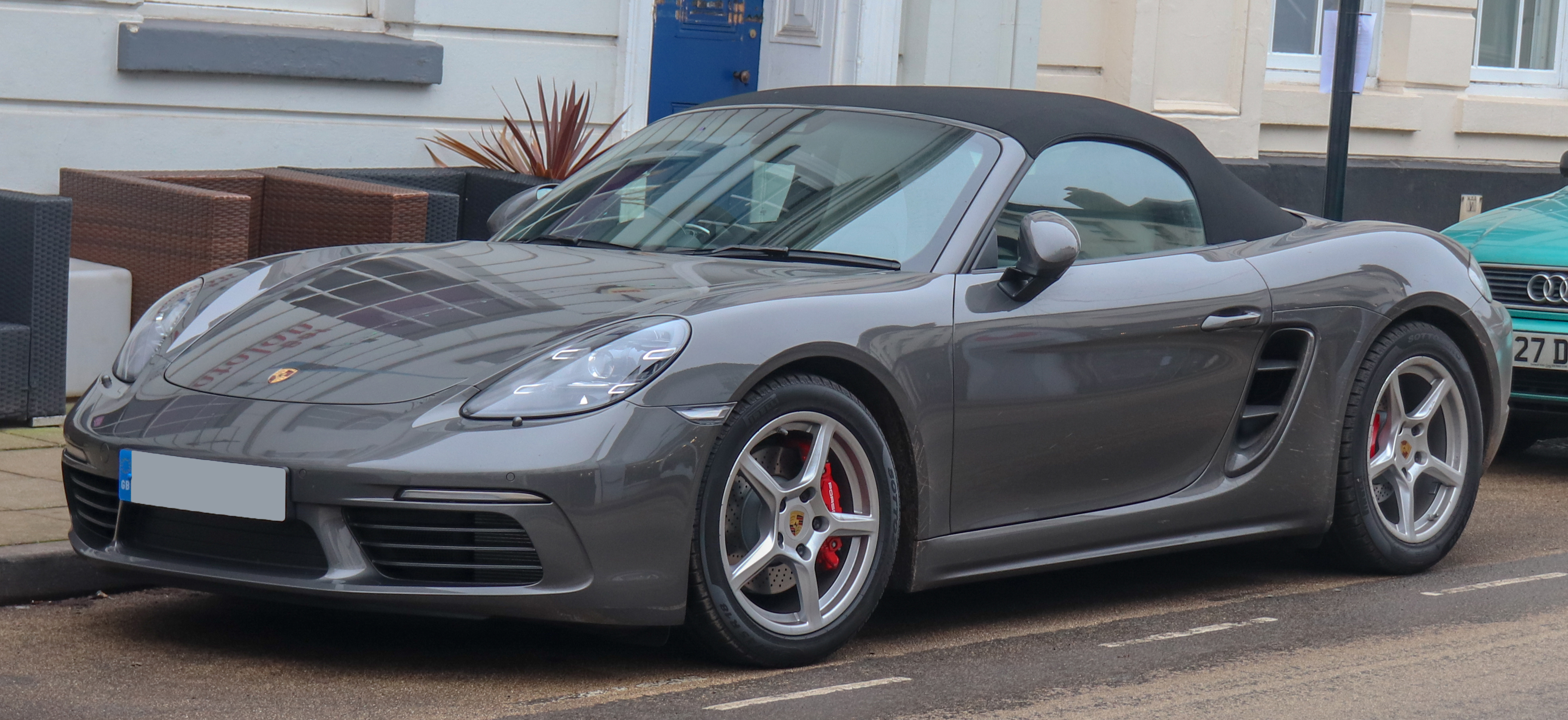
Front (Boxster)

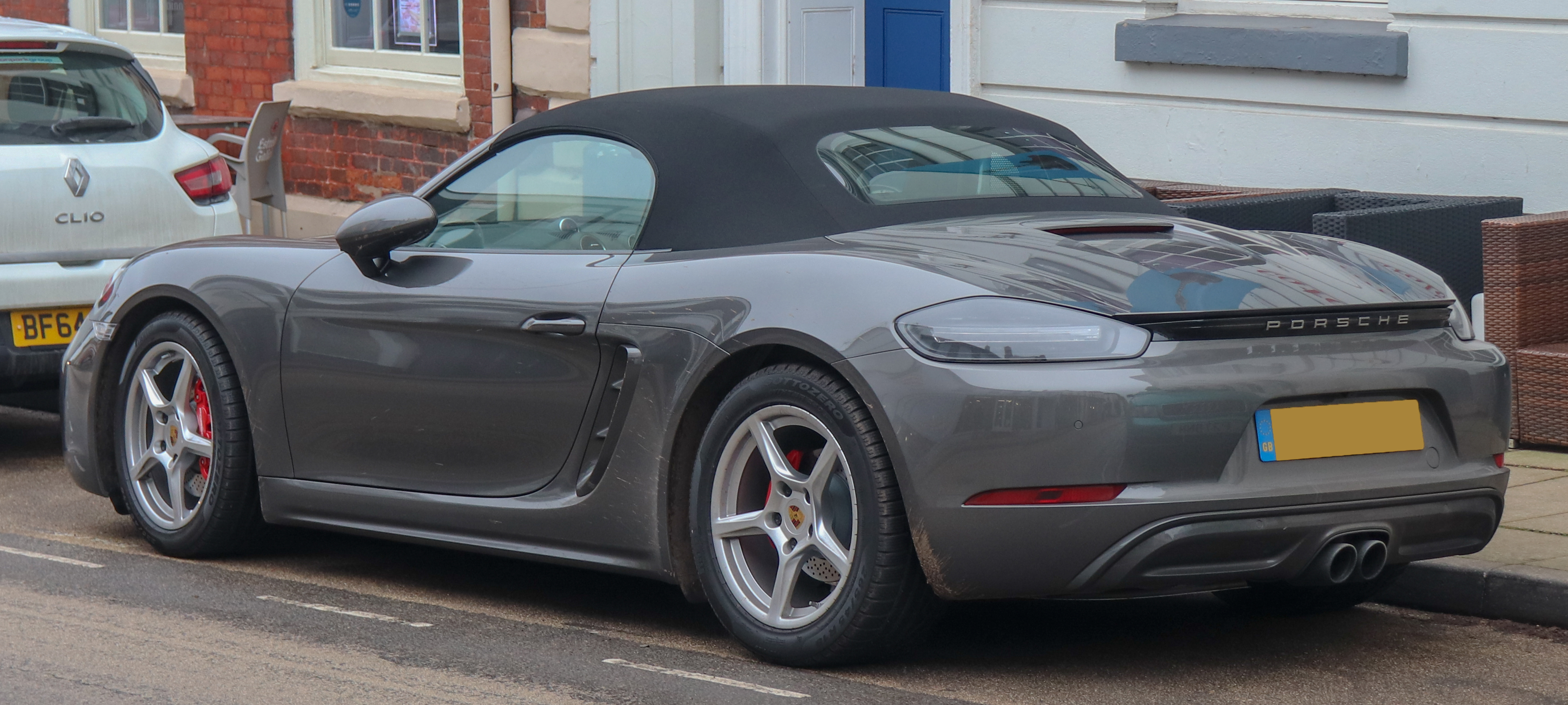
Rear (Boxster)

The 718 Boxster was introduced in January 2016, and premiered at the 2016 Geneva Motor Show. The 718 Cayman joined the range in April at the Beijing Motor Show. The 718 featured two new horizontally opposed flat-4 turbocharged engines at 2.0-litre (Boxster/Cayman) and 2.5-litre (Boxster S/Cayman S) displacement with increased torque and horsepower with lower fuel consumption. The S model turbocharger utilizes Variable Turbine Geometry (VTG) technology.

=== 718 Boxster and Cayman T ===
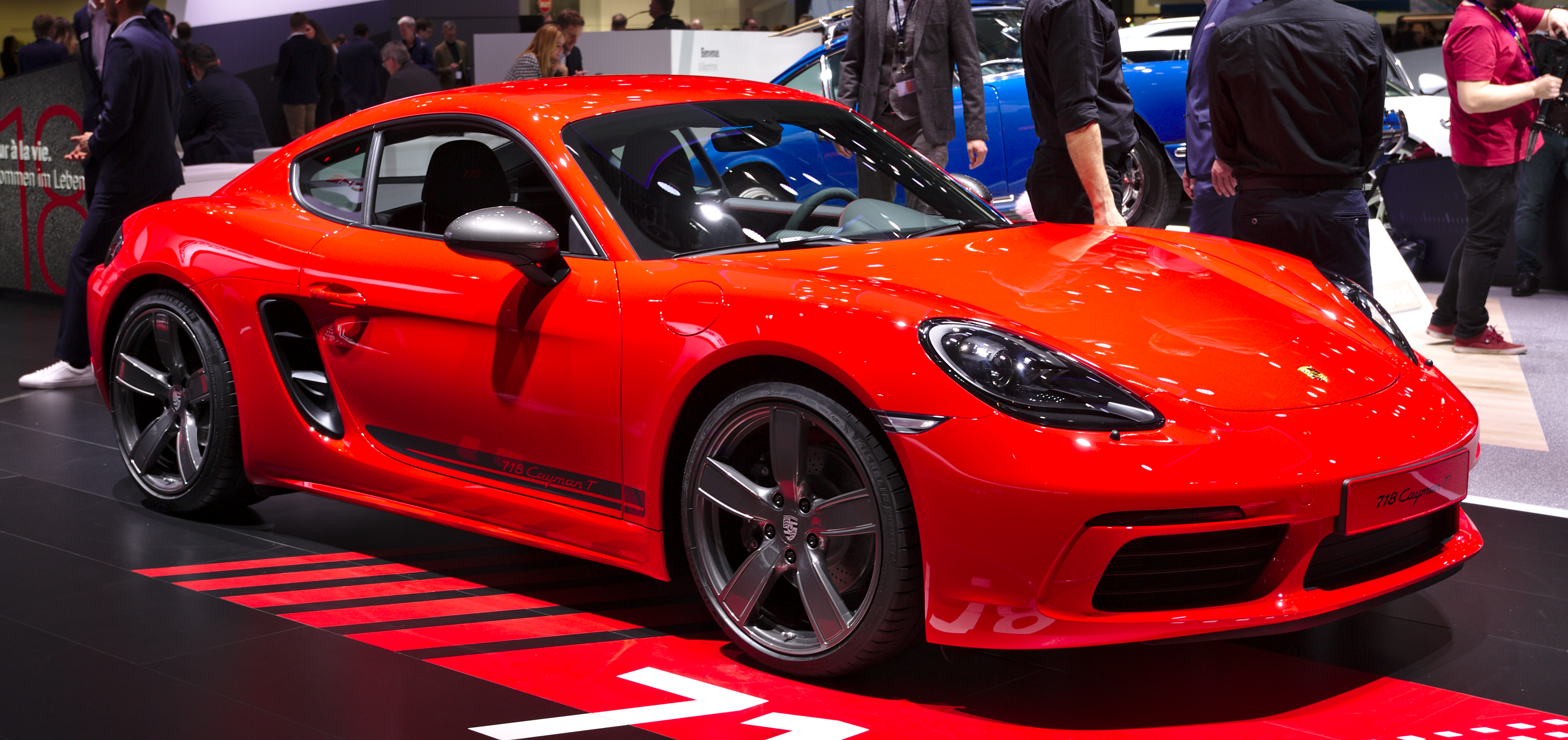
718 Cayman T

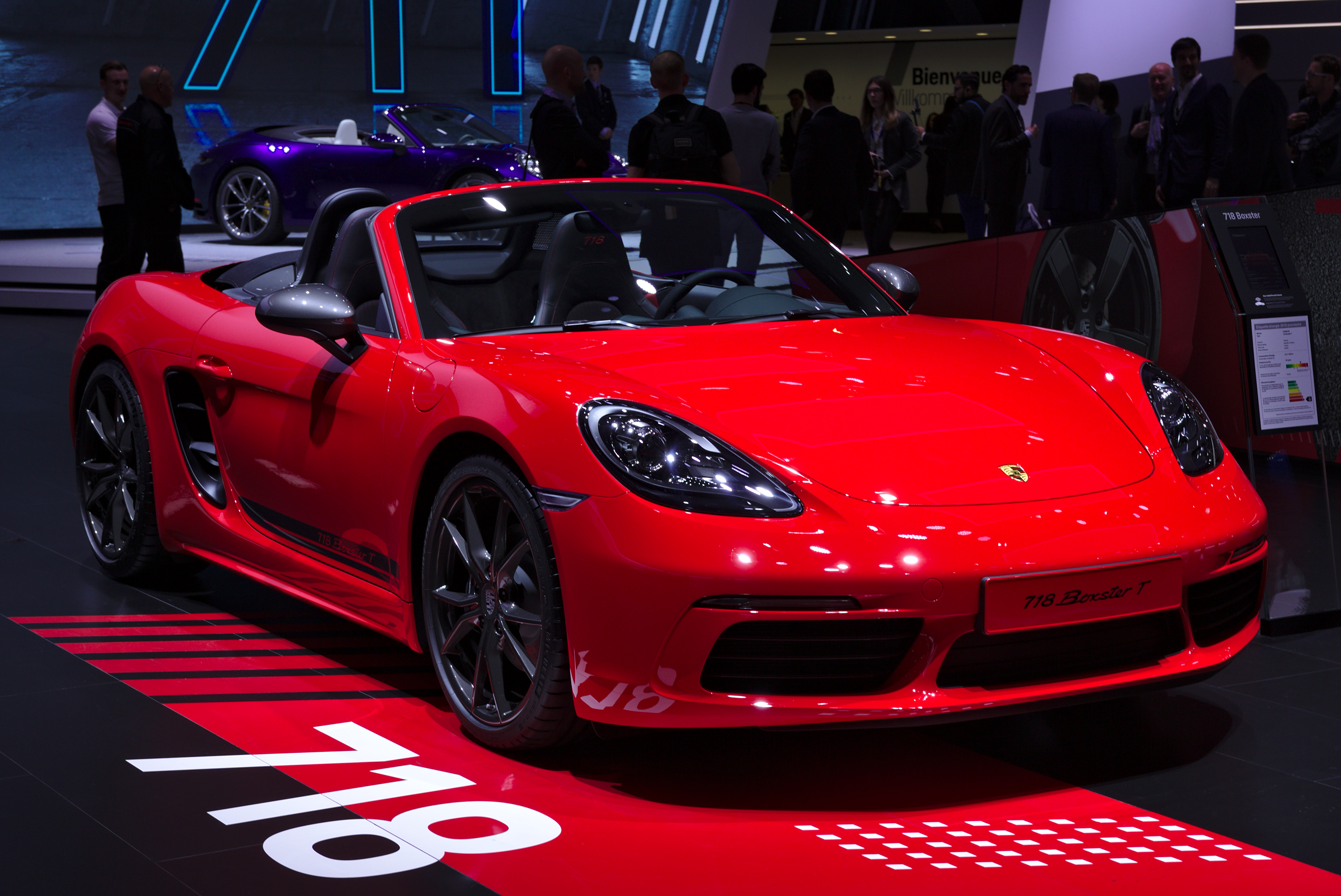
718 Boxster T

The 718 T models were released for the 2020 model year as more sport-oriented versions of the base 718 models. As such, the T features the same 2.0-litre flat-4 engine as the base 718 but adds performance-oriented options such as Porsche's 20mm drop sport suspension system, the Sport Chrono package with dynamic drivetrain mounts, a limited-slip differential, GT4 short shifter from the GT4, and sports exhaust with black tips, along with cosmetic differences including special decals along the lower doors, a smaller-diameter sport steering wheel, door pull straps in place of standard door handles, wheels from the Porsche 992 Carrera S in special Titanium Grey color, and Titanium Grey rear badging. It also includes Titanium Grey mirror caps, black headlight washers, black interior trim, Sports-Tex Cloth and Leather Sports-plus seats.

=== 718 Boxster and Cayman GTS ===
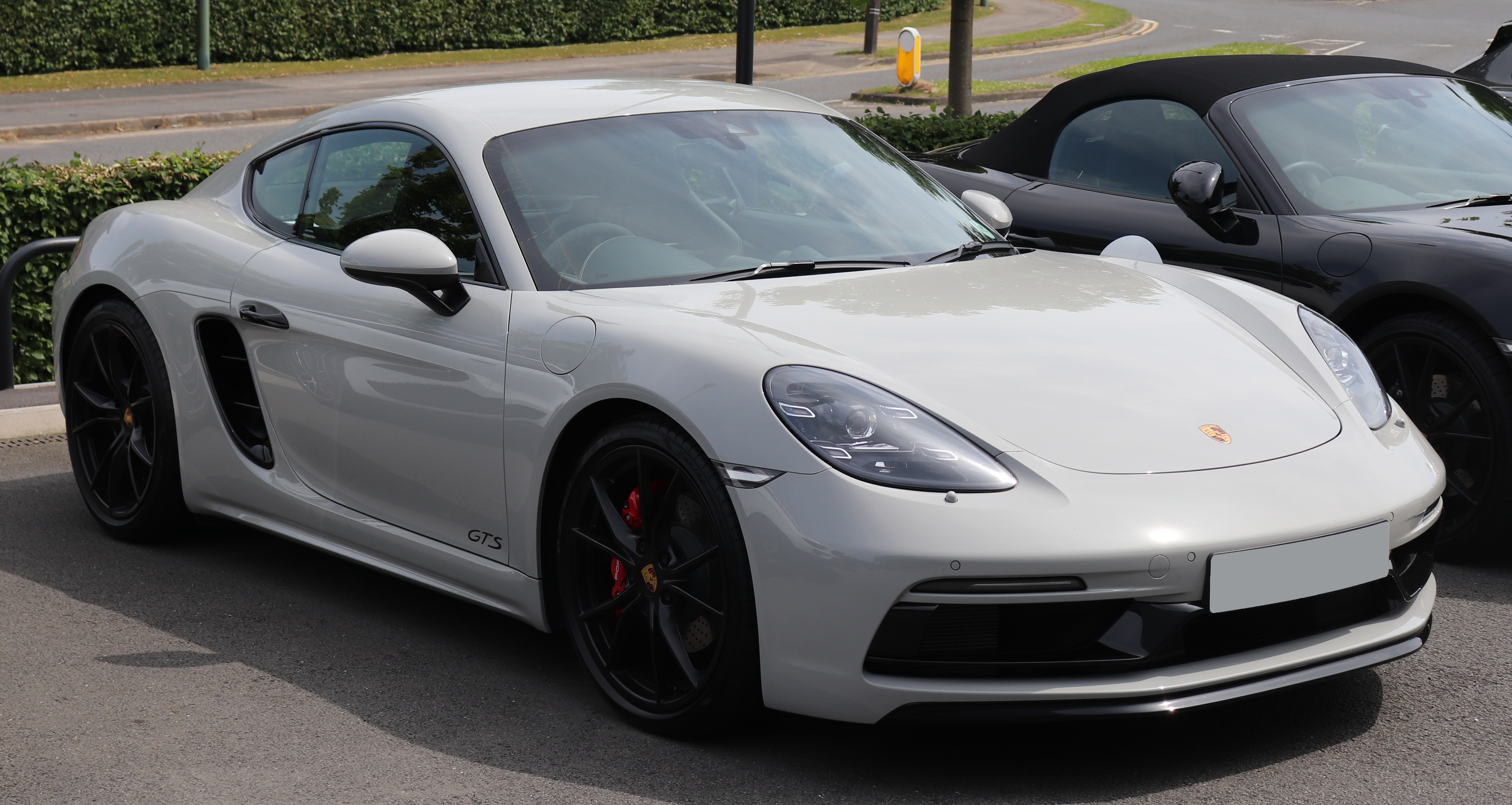
718 Cayman GTS

Later in October 2017, the GTS models were announced with their 2.5-litre engines rated at 365 PS (360 hp; 268 kW). The Boxster could accelerate to 0–60 mph (97 km/h) from a standstill in 4.1 seconds, and the Cayman in 3.9 seconds.

=== 718 Boxster and Cayman GTS 4.0 ===
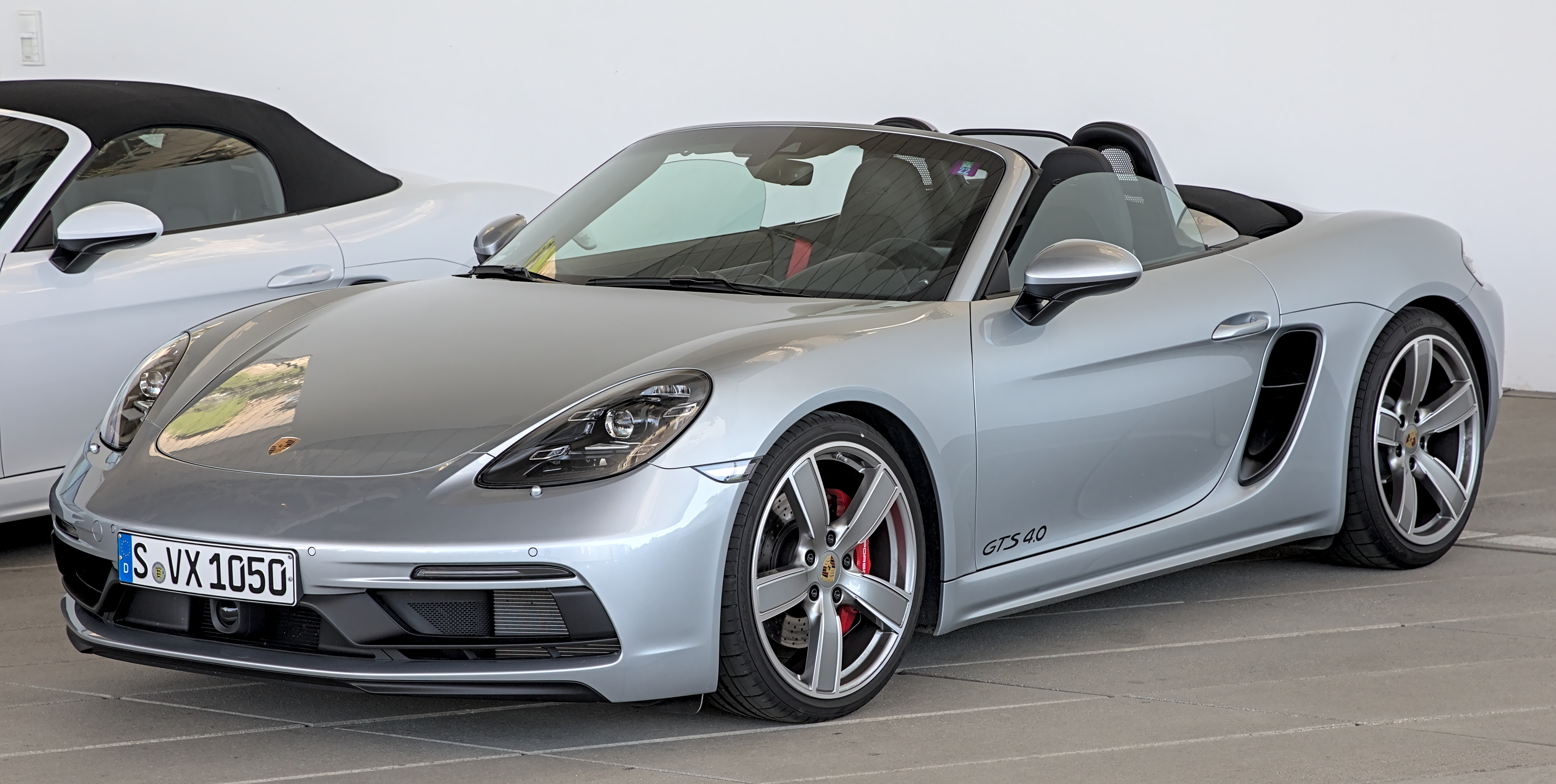
718 Boxster GTS 4.0

Since 2020, the GTS 4.0 model has been offered for both 718 models. The new model features the 4.0-litre flat-6 from the Cayman GT4 and Boxster Spyder, however de-tuned to 294 kW (400 PS; 394 hp). Both GTS 4.0 models can accelerate to 60 mph (97 km/h) from a standstill in 4.3 seconds. By late 2020, the PDK gearbox was available as an option for 718 GTS 4.0. The acceleration time of 0–60 mph (97 km/h) has been reduced to 3.9 seconds.

=== Styling ===
The exterior design of the 718 Boxster and Cayman closely follows that of the previous 981 generation, with evolutionary styling changes rather than a complete redesign. The most notable changes are to the rear of the car, which now has a long black-trim bar across the rear connecting the two taillights. The headlights and bumper are also heavily reworked. On the sides, the mirrors have been redesigned, taking hue from the SportDesign mirrors on the GT3.

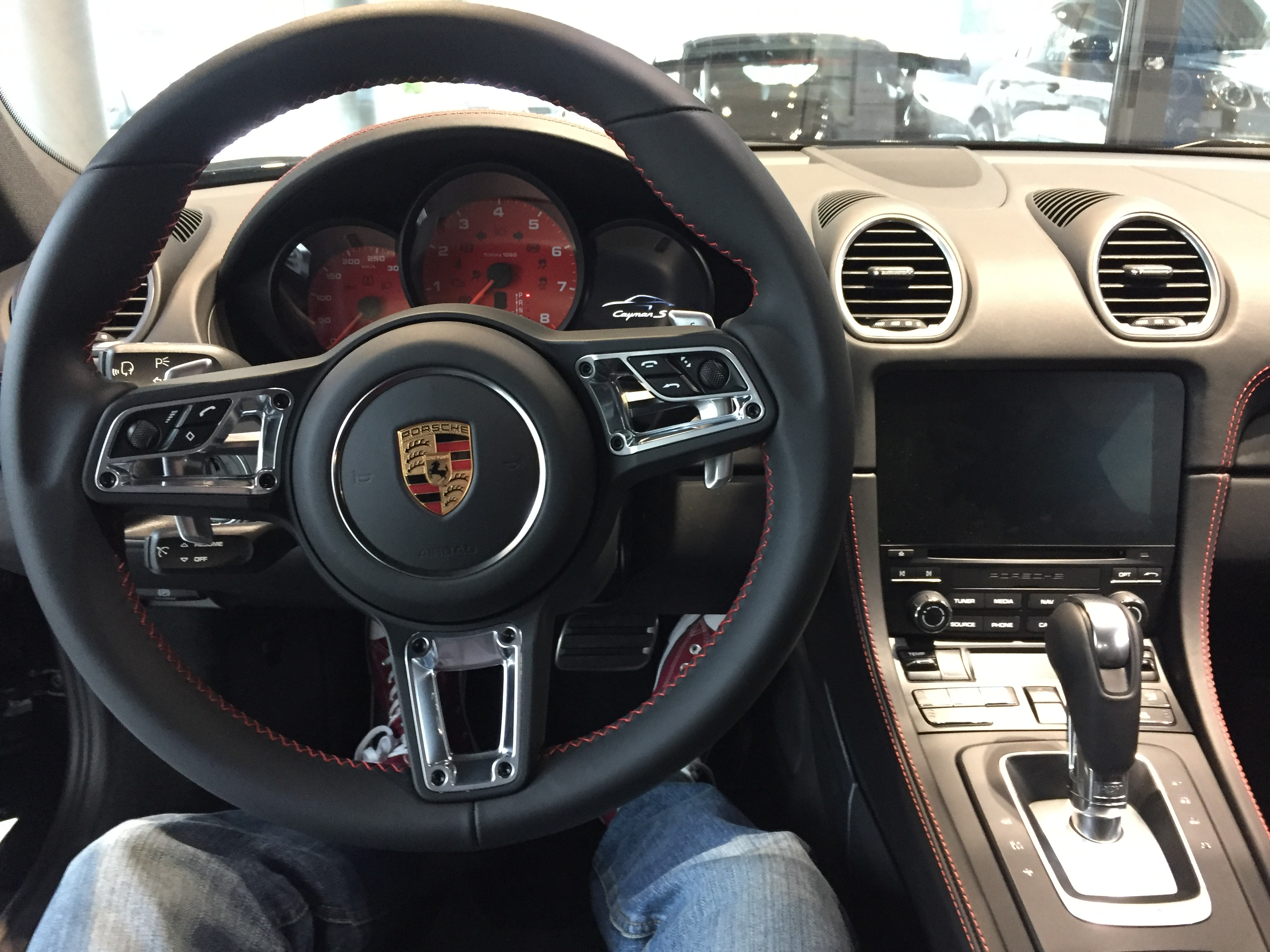
The updated interior of the 718 has the 4th generation of the Porsche PCM system, indicated by the display without bezels. This model has multifunction steering wheel controls.

The interior remains very similar to the 981 Cayman / Boxster and the 991.2 generation of the Porsche 911. The main change is the new PCM 4.0 infotainment system, which replaces the PCM 3.1. If the optional Sport Chrono package is present, the steering wheel comes with a mode selector switch that includes a selection of Sports and Sports Plus driving modes, resulting in snappier throttle response at the cost of fuel efficiency. Overall, the most prominent design features of the 981 Cayman / Boxster remain, including large air induction ports on the side, and the prominent horizontal aluminium piece used for adding oil and coolant in the trunk.

=== Reception ===
Despite the loss of two cylinders, the 718 Cayman / Boxster was assessed to be mechanically superior to the 981 model with improved acceleration and steering, while the new 4 cylinder engine "cheapens the experience". The 718 Cayman was declared Motor Trend's 2nd best Drivers car in 2017, which praised the car's handling and throttle response. Giving the award, Miguel Cortina noted, "The suspension is just what you want to feel in a car like this—stiff, sporty, rigid. You get a very good sense of what is happening on the road."

By far, the most contentious reaction to the 718 Cayman was the sound of the engine - which received nearly universal criticism by the automotive press. Car and Driver called it a "raspy, uncouth sound that strikes some drivers as unpleasant and grating." Top Gear noted that the sound, "fundamentally cheapens the Porsche experience," and makes the car, "less upmarket, less cultured and sophisticated than it did before." However, Motor Trend's Ignition tested the 718 Cayman against the 981 Cayman GT4, and found that the performance gains were so strong the car had the capability to outmaneuver the GT4 at a much lower price. They concluded that the tradeoff was probably worth it.

The 718 GTS variant of the Cayman and Boxster received generally positive reviews. Visually, the front headlight and rear taillights were smokey black, and an aggressive front sports fascia was added. Performance upgrades included Porsche Sports Exhaust, a Sports Chrono Package, Porsche Stability Management were all added as standard features. By expanding the air intake, the 718 GTS has an additional 15-horsepower and even more torque than the 718 S. In addition, carmine red was added as a color as a $2580 option. Used in most of Porsche advertising with the GTS, the color is darker than Porsche Guards Red, and very similar to the Italian racing color used by Ferrari, Rosso Corsa.

Many reviewers, including New York Times contributor Tom Voelk, noted that the 718 GTS had a much more pleasing sound than the base 718 and the 718 S. "One of the biggest complaints of the 718 is that its turbo 4 engine doesn't have the distinctive sound that the outgoing 6 cylinder had," said Voelk. "But the 718 GTS sounds much better. It has different intakes and a larger turbo." The sound of the 718 GTS engine has much more prominent bass frequencies, which contrast with a strong treble pitch of the turbocharger.

However, Evo magazine wrote that, while "capable of challenging the 911 as a true sports car", the "718 version of the GTS doesn't really achieve anything more than the Cayman GTS it replaces" and "with its more desirable engine, it's the previous model that feels more exotic and like a much higher quality product." It describes the GTS' engine as "a nasty sounding motor", the noise from the turbo four-cylinder in the cabin as "dreadful" and "tuneless drivel" and contests that "the only redeeming feature of the 718 GTS sonically is that this is probably the quietest iteration of this motor".

These criticisms were blunted in the 2020 model year when the turbo four cylinder was upgraded to the naturally aspirated 4.0 liter six cylinder for the GTS models (see GTS 4.0 above).

== 718 Cayman GT4 and 718 Spyder ==
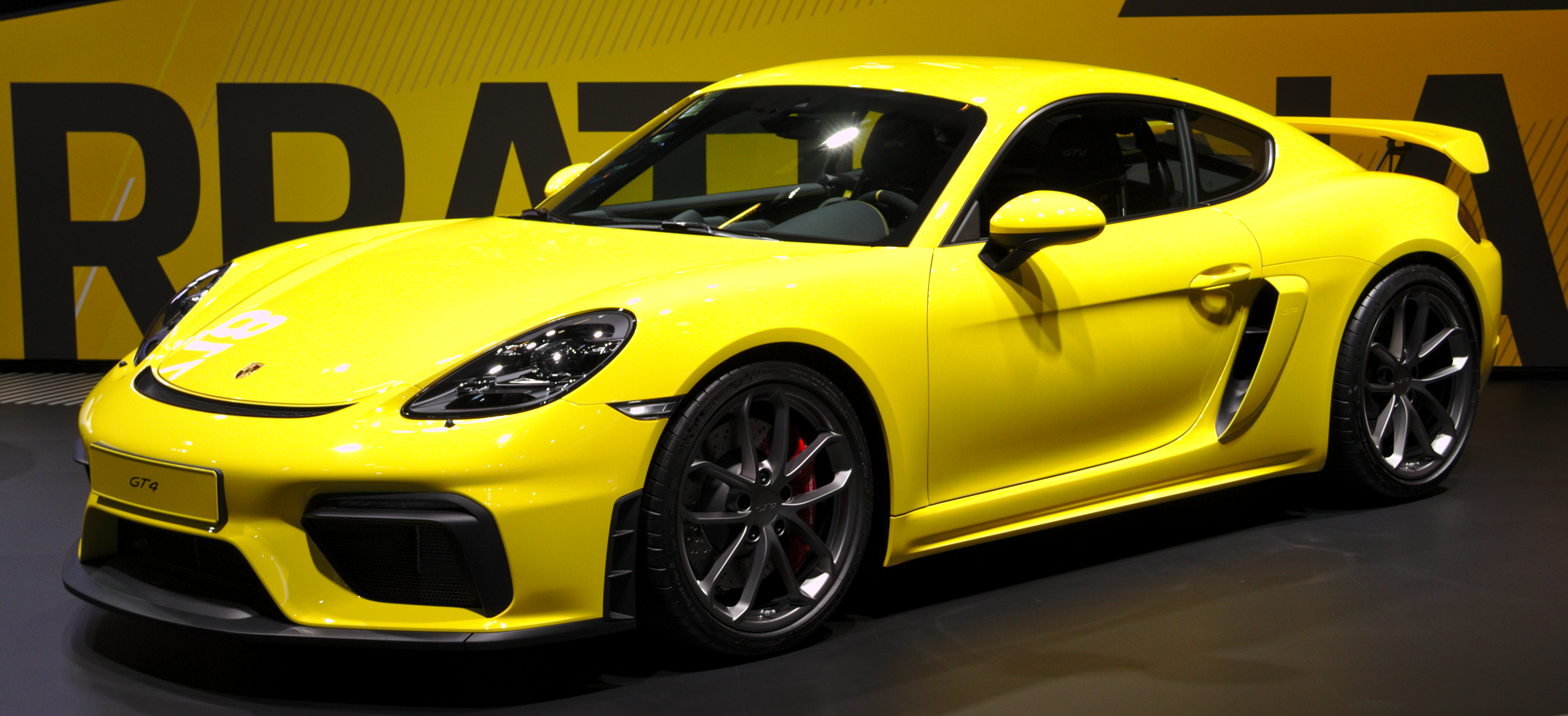
718 Cayman GT4

The 718 Cayman GT4 and 718 Spyder (previously named the Boxster Spyder) were revealed in June 2019. Both are differentiated from less powerful models by more aggressive bodywork, including a lower stance, new front bumper, a large new diffuser, and exhaust pipes that are spaced farther apart. The GT4 also features larger side intakes and an adjustable wing, the latter of which helps it generate up to 150 kg (330 lb) of downforce, 50 percent more than its predecessor. Both have a naturally aspirated 4.0-litre flat-6 derived from the 992's 3.0-litre 9A2EVO engine, which is rated at 309 kW (414 hp; 420 PS) at 7,600 rpm and 420 N⋅m (310 lb⋅ft) of torque at 5,000–6,800 rpm. The engine has cylinder deactivation, a first for Porsche. Porsche claims a top speed of 304 km/h (189 mph) for the GT4, and 301 km/h (187 mph) for the Spyder. The front suspension and brakes are borrowed from the 911 GT3, and the adaptive dampers, ABS and stability-control programming are borrowed from the 911 GT3 RS. The anti-roll bar end links, camber and toe can be manually adjusted, but the ride height–3 cm (1.2 in) lower than a standard 718–is fixed. Both are around 15 kg heavier than the GTS models. Sales commenced in the spring of 2020.

For the 2021 model year, the GT4 and Spyder became available with the 7-speed PDK dual-clutch transmission as an option. It reduces the 0-60 mph (97 km/h) acceleration time from 4.3 seconds to 3.7 seconds.

In March of 2023, Porsche announced that 718 GT4 and Spyder Models would cease production as of the 2024 model year, however it was later extended through the 2025 model year with production ending October 2025.

=== 718 Cayman GT4 RS ===
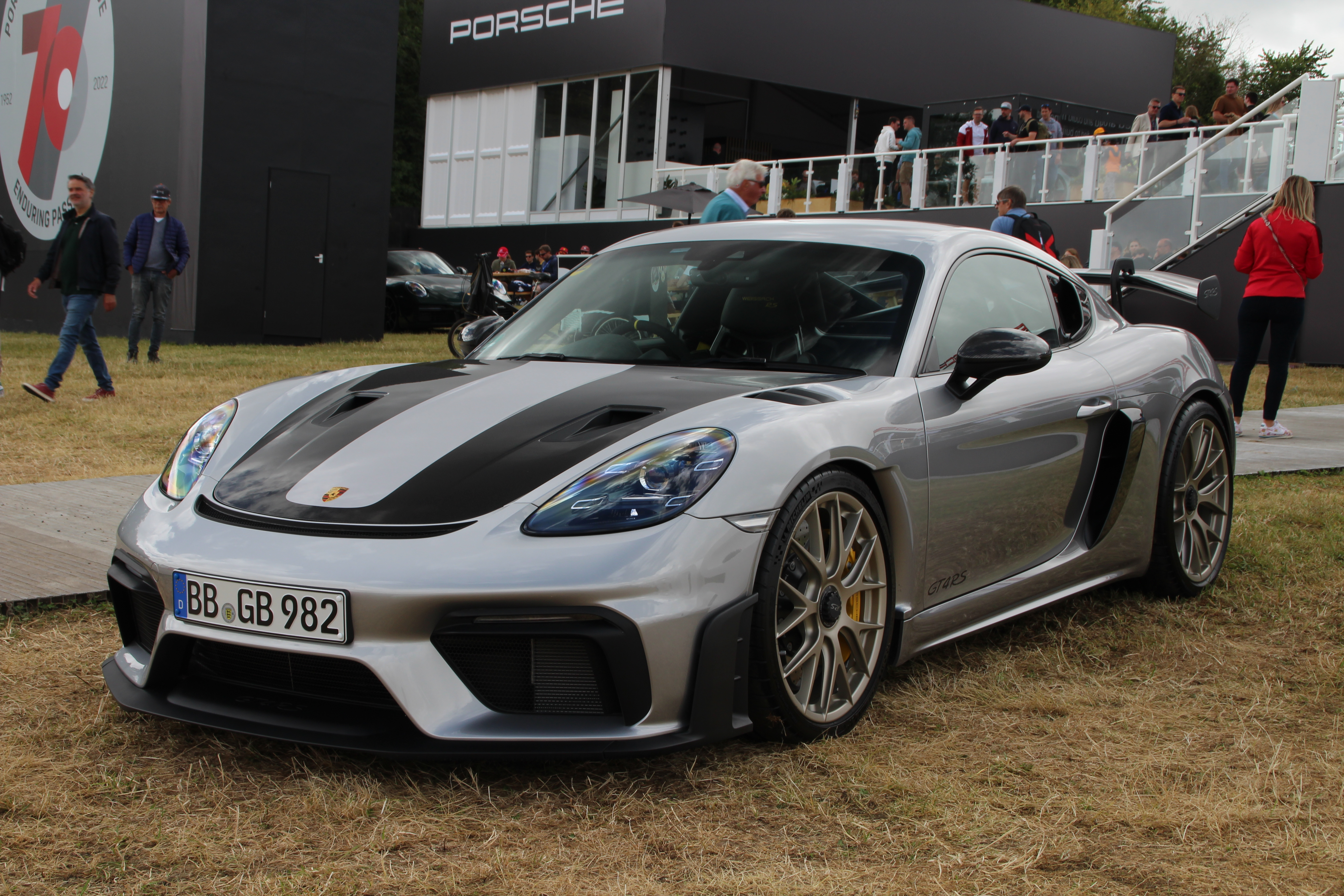
718 Cayman GT4 RS

In 2021, Porsche unveiled the 718 Cayman GT4 RS, the first Cayman to receive the RS treatment which is usually reserved for the 911 models. With a 4.0 L naturally aspirated flat-six derived from the 911 GT3, it produces 500 PS (368 kW; 493 hp) and 450 N⋅m (332 lbf⋅ft) with a redline of 9,000 rpm, which allows it to accelerate from 0–100 km/h (0–62 mph) in 3.4 seconds. It generates 25% more downforce than the GT4 variant, through a swan-neck attachment fixed rear wing. The GT4 RS lapped the Nürburgring Nordschleife 23 seconds faster than the GT4.

== Specifications ==
Year	Models	Engine	Power	Torque	Transmission (gears)	0–100 km/h (62 mph)	0–60 mph (97 km/h)	Top speed	CO_{2}
2016–2025	Cayman / Boxster (China)	2.0 L (1,988 cc) turbocharged (91x76.4 mm) flat-4	250 PS (247 hp; 184 kW)	310 N⋅m (229 lb⋅ft)	PDK (7)	5.6 seconds	5.4 seconds	260 km/h (162 mph)	174 g/km
2016–2025	Cayman / Boxster (China)	2.0 L (1,988 cc) turbocharged (91x76.4 mm) flat-4	250 PS (247 hp; 184 kW)	310 N⋅m (229 lb⋅ft)	PDK Sport Chrono (7)	5.4 seconds	5.2 seconds	260 km/h (162 mph)	174 g/km
2016–2025	Cayman / Boxster	2.0 L (1,988 cc) turbocharged (91x76.4 mm) flat-4	300 PS (296 hp; 221 kW)	380 N⋅m (280 lb⋅ft)	Manual (6)	5.1 seconds	4.9 seconds	275 km/h (171 mph)	168 g/km
2016–2025	Cayman / Boxster	2.0 L (1,988 cc) turbocharged (91x76.4 mm) flat-4	300 PS (296 hp; 221 kW)	380 N⋅m (280 lb⋅ft)	PDK (7)	4.9 seconds	4.7 seconds	275 km/h (171 mph)	158 g/km
2020–2025	Cayman / Boxster T	2.0 L (1,988 cc) turbocharged (91x76.4 mm) flat-4	300 PS (296 hp; 221 kW)	380 N⋅m (280 lb⋅ft)	PDK Sport Chrono (7)	4.7 seconds	4.5 seconds	275 km/h (171 mph)	158 g/km
2016–2025	Cayman / Boxster S	2.5 L (2,497 cc) turbocharged (102x76.4 mm) flat-4	350 PS (345 hp; 257 kW)	420 N⋅m (310 lb⋅ft)	Manual (6)	4.6 seconds	4.4 seconds	285 km/h (177 mph)	184 g/km
2016–2025	Cayman / Boxster S	2.5 L (2,497 cc) turbocharged (102x76.4 mm) flat-4	350 PS (345 hp; 257 kW)	420 N⋅m (310 lb⋅ft)	PDK (7)	4.4 seconds	4.2 seconds	285 km/h (177 mph)	167 g/km
2016–2025	Cayman / Boxster S	2.5 L (2,497 cc) turbocharged (102x76.4 mm) flat-4	350 PS (345 hp; 257 kW)	420 N⋅m (310 lb⋅ft)	PDK Sport Chrono (7)	4.2 seconds	4.0 seconds	285 km/h (177 mph)	167 g/km
2017–2019	Cayman / Boxster GTS	2.5 L (2,497 cc) turbocharged (102x76.4 mm) flat-4	365 PS (360 hp; 268 kW)	430 N⋅m (317 lb⋅ft)	Manual (6)	4.6 seconds	4.4 seconds	290 km/h (180 mph)	205 g/km
2017–2019	Cayman / Boxster GTS	2.5 L (2,497 cc) turbocharged (102x76.4 mm) flat-4	365 PS (360 hp; 268 kW)	430 N⋅m (317 lb⋅ft)	PDK (7)	4.3 seconds	4.1 seconds	290 km/h (180 mph)	186 g/km
2017–2019	Cayman / Boxster GTS	2.5 L (2,497 cc) turbocharged (102x76.4 mm) flat-4	365 PS (360 hp; 268 kW)	430 N⋅m (317 lb⋅ft)	PDK Sport Chrono (7)	4.1 seconds	3.9 seconds	290 km/h (180 mph)	186 g/km
2020–2025	Cayman / Boxster GTS 4.0	4.0 L (3,995 cc) (102x81.5 mm) flat-6	400 PS (395 hp; 294 kW)	420 N⋅m (310 lb⋅ft)	Manual (6)	4.5 seconds	4.3 seconds	293 km/h (182 mph)	246 g/km
2020–2025	Cayman / Boxster GTS 4.0	4.0 L (3,995 cc) (102x81.5 mm) flat-6	400 PS (395 hp; 294 kW)	420 N⋅m (310 lb⋅ft)	PDK (7)	4.0 seconds	3.8 seconds	288 km/h (179 mph)	230 g/km
2019–2023	Cayman GT4 / Spyder	4.0 L (3,995 cc) (102x81.5 mm) flat-6	420 PS (414 hp; 309 kW)	420 N⋅m (310 lb⋅ft)	Manual (6)	4.4 seconds	4.2 seconds	304 km/h (189 mph)	251 g/km
2020–2023	Cayman GT4 / Spyder	4.0 L (3,995 cc) (102x81.5 mm) flat-6	420 PS (414 hp; 309 kW)	430 N⋅m (317 lb⋅ft)	PDK (7)	3.9 seconds	3.7 seconds	304 km/h (189 mph)	242 g/km
2022–2025	Cayman GT4 RS / Spyder RS	4.0 L (3,995 cc) (102x81.5 mm) flat-6	500 PS (493 hp; 368 kW)	450 N⋅m (332 lb⋅ft)	PDK (7)	3.4 seconds	3.2 seconds	315 km/h (196 mph)	299 g/km

== Motorsport ==
=== 718 Cayman GT4 Clubsport ===
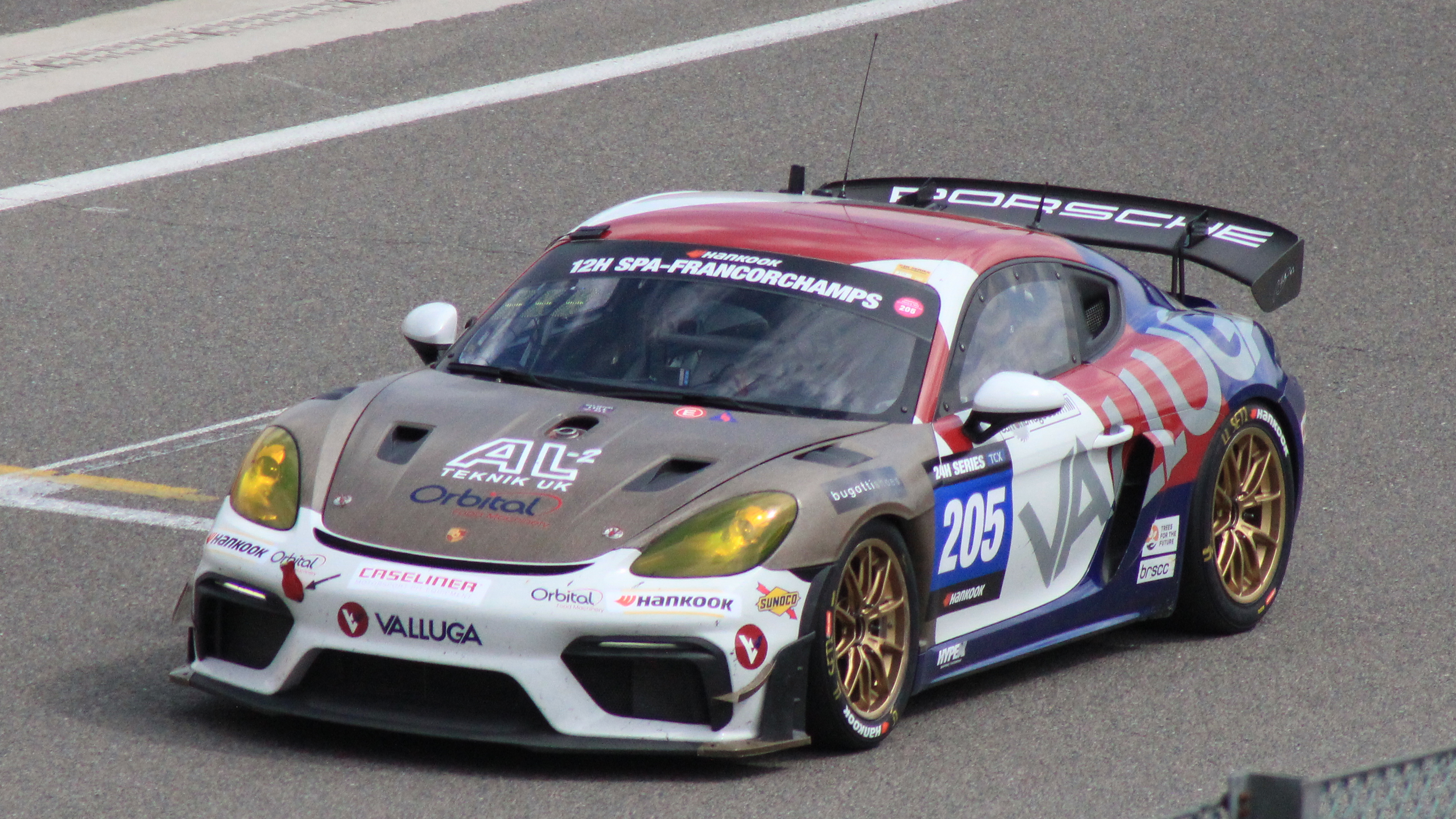
GT4 CS Homologated 24H GT-Car

On 3 January 2019 the 718 Cayman GT4 Clubsport was unveiled in two variants, Competition and Trackday, with first customer cars delivered to customer teams ahead of the 2019 Roar Before the Rolex 24 Hours at Daytona International Speedway. The race car is powered by a 3.8-litre naturally aspirated flat-six engine producing 425 PS (419 bhp; 313 kW) at 7,500 rpm and 425 N⋅m (313 lb⋅ft) at 6,600 rpm connected to a 6-speed PDK gearbox. The Engine is repurposed from the Road-spec GT4 but destroked from 81.5mm to 77.5 mm, dropping the displacement from 3,995 cc (4.0 L) to 3,799 cc (3.8 L). The engine in-turn has a compression ratio of 12.5:1 over the GT4's 13:1, because of the shortening of the stroke. The kerb weight is 1,320 kg (2,910 lb). Both variants feature a welded-in roll cage, a six-point harness and race bucket seat, a selection of body parts made of natural-fibre composite materials, the front suspension from the 911 GT3 Cup, racing brakes, lightweight forged wheels and slick tyres. Aerodynamics are improved over the previous generation GT4 Clubsport, including a swan neck mount rear wing. The Competition variant features 3-way adjustable shock absorbers, a 115-litre fuel cell, brake balance adjustment, a lightweight battery, a fire extinguishing system, a quick release steering wheel from the 911 GT3 R and a three-piston air jack system while the Trackday variant features fixed shock absorbers, an 80-litre fuel cell and a handheld fire extinguisher instead. The new Porsche Sprint Challenge GB, which is made up of Porsche 718 Cayman GT4 Clubsport cars, was supposed to start at Silverstone Circuit on 25 April 2020 but will now start on 6 June 2020 at the same circuit.

=== 718 Cayman GT4 RS Clubsport ===
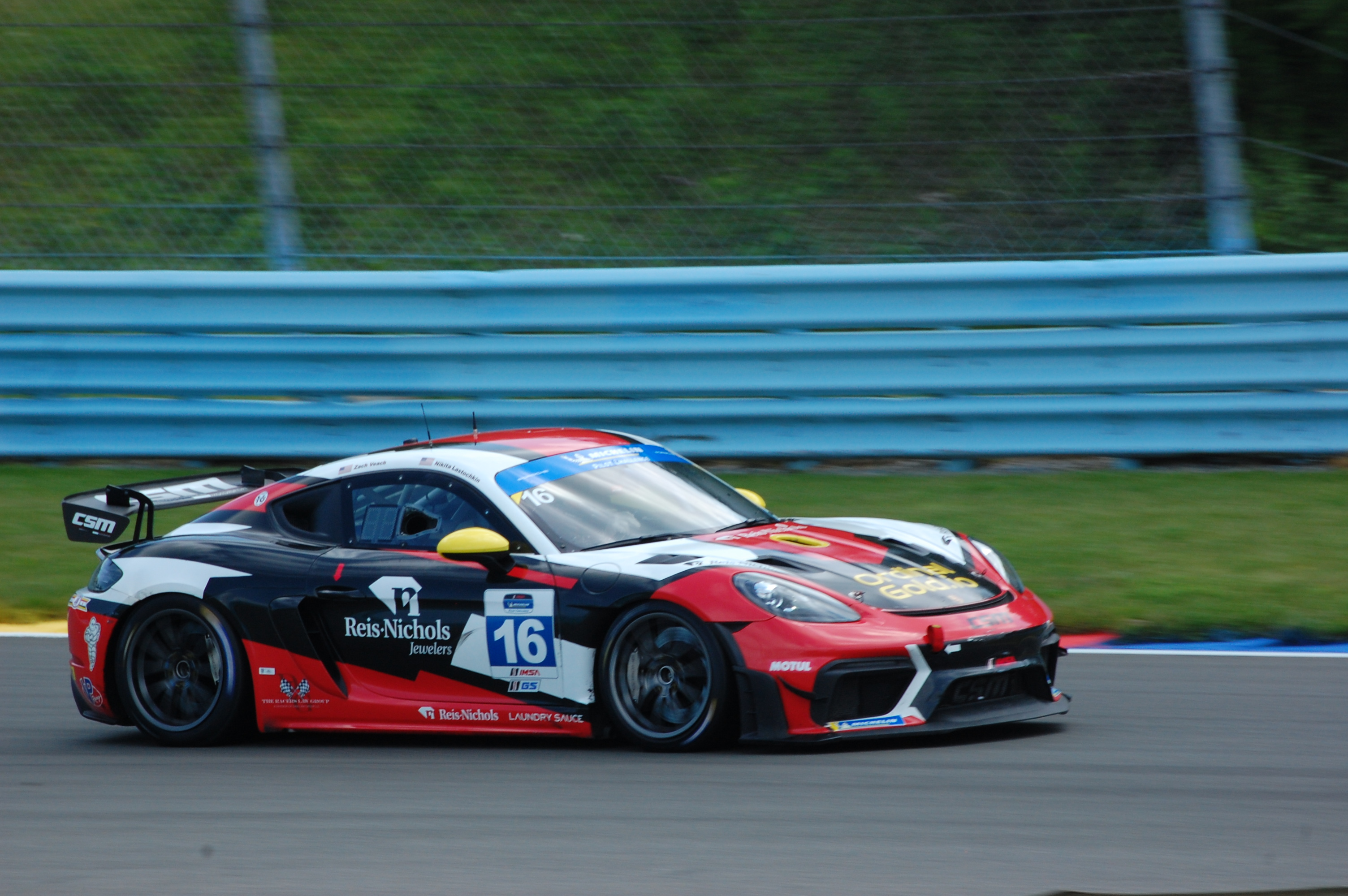
The No. 16 718 Cayman GT4 RS Clubsport of Czabok-Simpson Motorsport competing in the 2025 Michelin Pilot Challenge at Watkins Glen International.

The 718 Cayman GT4 RS Clubsport was announced at the Los Angeles Auto Show in November 2021, based on the GT4 RS announced at the same time; like the GT4 RS, output has been increased to 500 PS (368 kW; 493 hp) at 8300 rpm and 465 N⋅m (343 lbf⋅ft) at 6600 rpm by fitting the naturally aspirated 4.0 L flat-six engine from the 911 GT3. It is equipped with a 7-speed dual-clutch transmission.

=== 718 Cayman GT4 R-GT ===
A Rallying version of the 718 Cayman GT4 Clubsport built to FIA R-GT regulations has been announced as planned for the 2020 season. Although a race-ready model has not been publicized yet, there has been official reports from Porsche, advertising the car for the 2020 R-GT Rally Season. However the pictures and information pertaining to the car were portrayed by a prototype called the Cayman GT4 Rallye Concept Car, which is essentially a mock-up of the upcoming homologated GT class rally car. The concept car shares the same engine and transmission, but is manufactured on the 981 platform; while the media-evasive production variant is advertised to be on the 982. "I'm not convinced Porsche will ever put the production car into an official race, we haven't even yet seen a 982 concept even though it was announced to be race-ready in 2020." - Netherlands GT4 Racer Roy Turksma via a television interview at 12H Spa-Francorchamps

=== 718 Cayman GT4 e-Performance ===
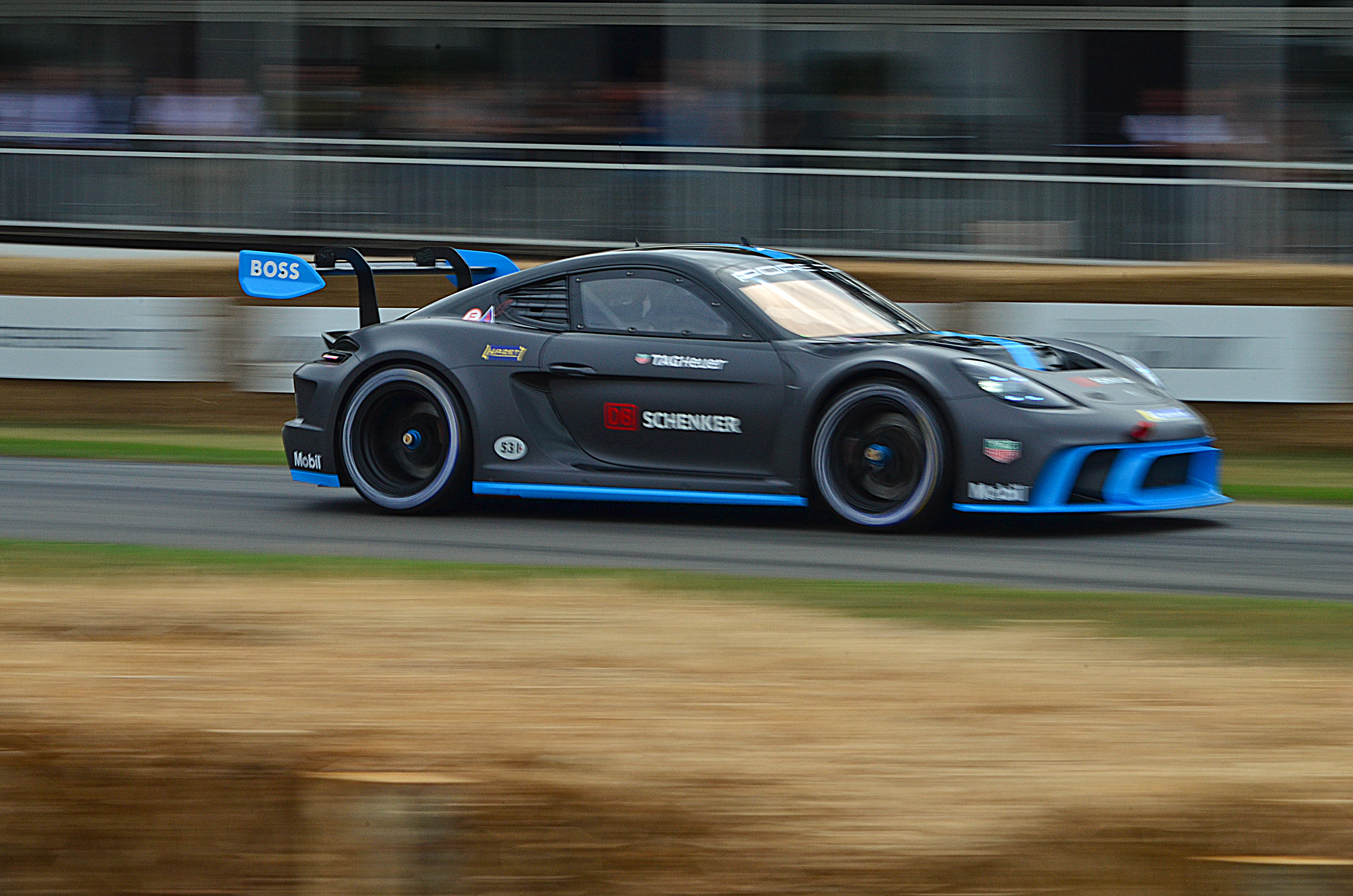
Cayman e-Performance at Goodwood Festival of Speed in July 2022

The 718 Cayman GT4 e-Performance is a battery electric vehicle with a drivetrain identical to the Porsche Mission R, first shown in May 2022. Compared to the GT4 Clubsport, the body of the e-Performance is 5.5 in (140 mm) wider. The estimated curb weight is 1,500 kg (3,300 lb). Porsche claims the GT4 e-Performance can beat a 911 GT3 Cup around most tracks.

The high-voltage traction battery has a capacity of 82 kWh and operates at a nominal voltage of 900 V. The car can be switched between qualifying and race modes. In qualifying mode, the battery can deliver up to 800 kW (1,073 hp) to all four wheels through two traction motors, one on each axle; in race mode, total output is limited to 450 kW (604 hp) to sustain performance over a typical 30-minute race. Maximum recharging rate is 350 kW, enabling a rapid replenishment of charge from five to eighty percent in fifteen minutes; regenerative braking is expected to replenish approximately 1/2 of the total energy consumed in a 30-minute race. To improve weight distribution, the battery is split into three segments: one carried behind the seats where the engine would be in the conventional 718 Cayman, one in front where the fuel tank would be, and the last in the passenger's footwell.
