= 2026 24H Series =

Twelfth season of the Creventic 24H Series

The Michelin 2026 24H Series was the twelfth season of the 24H Series with drivers battling for championship points and titles, and the seventeenth season since Creventic, the organiser and promoter of the series, organised multiple races a year. The races are contested with GT3-spec cars, GT4-spec cars, sports cars and 24H-Specials, like silhouette cars, TCR Touring Cars, TCX cars and TC cars.

== Calendar ==
The calendar was released on 7 October 2025. The only change to the calendar was the replacement of the race at Misano with the Nürburgring.

Round	Event	Circuit	Date	Supporting program
1	Michelin 12 Hours of Mugello	Mugello Circuit, Scarperia e San Piero, Italy	20–22 March	TCR Europe Touring Car Series; Prototype Cup Europe; Radical Cup Europe
2	Michelin 12 Hours of Spa-Francorchamps	Circuit de Spa-Francorchamps, Stavelot, Belgium	17–19 April	TCR Europe Cup; Radical Cup Europe
3	Michelin 12 Hours of Paul Ricard	Circuit Paul Ricard, Le Castellet, Var, France	5–7 June	TCR Europe Touring Car Series; Radical Cup Europe
4	Michelin 12 Hours of Nürburgring	Nürburgring, Nürburg, Germany	3–5 July	Prototype Cup Europe; Radical Cup Europe
5	Michelin 24 Hours of Barcelona	Circuit de Barcelona-Catalunya, Montmeló, Spain	18–20 September	Radical Cup Europe; Radical World Finals

== Teams and drivers ==
=== GT3 ===
Team	Car	Engine	No.	Drivers	Class	Rounds
(Antigua and Barbuda) HAAS RT	Audi R8 LMS Evo II	Audi DAR 5.2 L V10	2	(Belgium) Simon Balcaen	Am	2
(Antigua and Barbuda) HAAS RT	Audi R8 LMS Evo II	Audi DAR 5.2 L V10	2	(Belgium) Mathieu Castelein	Am	2
(Antigua and Barbuda) HAAS RT	Audi R8 LMS Evo II	Audi DAR 5.2 L V10	2	(Belgium) Pierre Castelein	Am	2
(Antigua and Barbuda) HAAS RT	Audi R8 LMS Evo II	Audi DAR 5.2 L V10	2	(France) Steven Palette	Am	2
(Antigua and Barbuda) HAAS RT	Audi R8 LMS Evo II	Audi DAR 5.2 L V10	2	(Belgium) Simon Balcaen	PA	3
(Antigua and Barbuda) HAAS RT	Audi R8 LMS Evo II	Audi DAR 5.2 L V10	2	(France) Steven Palette	PA	3
(Antigua and Barbuda) HAAS RT	Audi R8 LMS Evo II	Audi DAR 5.2 L V10	21	(Belgium) Peter Guelinckx	Am	1–3
(Antigua and Barbuda) HAAS RT	Audi R8 LMS Evo II	Audi DAR 5.2 L V10	21	(Belgium) Nicolas Guelinckx	Am	1–2
(Antigua and Barbuda) HAAS RT	Audi R8 LMS Evo II	Audi DAR 5.2 L V10	21	(Belgium) Simon Balcaen	Am	2
(Antigua and Barbuda) HAAS RT	Audi R8 LMS Evo II	Audi DAR 5.2 L V10	21	(Belgium) Mathieu Castelein	Am	3
(Antigua and Barbuda) HAAS RT	Audi R8 LMS Evo II	Audi DAR 5.2 L V10	21	(Belgium) Pierre Castelein	Am	3
(Antigua and Barbuda) HAAS RT	BMW M4 GT3 Evo	BMW P58 3.0 L I6	21	(Belgium) Nicolas Guelinckx	Am	4–5
(Antigua and Barbuda) HAAS RT	BMW M4 GT3 Evo	BMW P58 3.0 L I6	21	(Belgium) Peter Guelinckx	Am	4–5
(Antigua and Barbuda) HAAS RT	BMW M4 GT3 Evo	BMW P58 3.0 L I6	21	(Spain) Manel Lao Cornargo	Am	5
(Antigua and Barbuda) HAAS RT	BMW M4 GT3 Evo	BMW P58 3.0 L I6	21	(Norway) Storm Gjerdrum	Am	5
(Switzerland) Hofor Racing	Mercedes-AMG GT3 Evo	Mercedes-AMG M159 6.2 L V8	11	(Germany) Torsten Kratz	Am	All
(Switzerland) Hofor Racing	Mercedes-AMG GT3 Evo	Mercedes-AMG M159 6.2 L V8	11	(Switzerland) Michael Kroll	Am	All
(Switzerland) Hofor Racing	Mercedes-AMG GT3 Evo	Mercedes-AMG M159 6.2 L V8	11	(Germany) Alexander Prinz	Am	All
(Switzerland) Hofor Racing	Mercedes-AMG GT3 Evo	Mercedes-AMG M159 6.2 L V8	11	(Switzerland) Chantal Prinz	Am	1–2, 4–5
(Switzerland) Hofor Racing	Mercedes-AMG GT3 Evo	Mercedes-AMG M159 6.2 L V8	11	(Germany) Maximilian Partl	Am	1, 3, 5
(France) Saintéloc Junior Team	Audi R8 LMS Evo II	Audi DAR 5.2 L V10	18	(Germany) Elia Erhart	PA	1, 3–5
(France) Saintéloc Junior Team	Audi R8 LMS Evo II	Audi DAR 5.2 L V10	18	(Germany) Pierre Kaffer	PA	1, 3–5
(France) Saintéloc Junior Team	Audi R8 LMS Evo II	Audi DAR 5.2 L V10	18	(France) Stephane Tribaudini	PA	1, 3–5
(France) Saintéloc Junior Team	Audi R8 LMS Evo II	Audi DAR 5.2 L V10	18	(Switzerland) Ernst Inderbitzin	PA	1, 4
(France) Saintéloc Junior Team	Audi R8 LMS Evo II	Audi DAR 5.2 L V10	18	(Austria) Michael Doppelmayr	PA	3–5
(France) Saintéloc Junior Team	Audi R8 LMS Evo II	Audi DAR 5.2 L V10	18	(France) Célia Martin	PA	5
(Germany) GetSpeed Team PCX Racing	Mercedes-AMG GT3 Evo	Mercedes-AMG M159 6.2 L V8	28	(France) Jordan Boisson	PA	All
(Germany) GetSpeed Team PCX Racing	Mercedes-AMG GT3 Evo	Mercedes-AMG M159 6.2 L V8	28	(France) Patrick Charlaix	PA	All
(Germany) GetSpeed Team PCX Racing	Mercedes-AMG GT3 Evo	Mercedes-AMG M159 6.2 L V8	28	(Belgium) Benjamin Paque	PA	All
(Germany) GetSpeed Team PCX Racing	Mercedes-AMG GT3 Evo	Mercedes-AMG M159 6.2 L V8	28	(Germany) Maro Engel	PA	1, 3
(Germany) GetSpeed Team PCX Racing	Mercedes-AMG GT3 Evo	Mercedes-AMG M159 6.2 L V8	28	(France) Marvin Klein	PA	2
(Germany) GetSpeed Team PCX Racing	Mercedes-AMG GT3 Evo	Mercedes-AMG M159 6.2 L V8	28	(Canada) Mikaël Grenier	PA	4
(Germany) GetSpeed Team PCX Racing	Mercedes-AMG GT3 Evo	Mercedes-AMG M159 6.2 L V8	28	(France) César Gazeau	PA	5
(Germany) GetSpeed Team PCX Racing	Mercedes-AMG GT3 Evo	Mercedes-AMG M159 6.2 L V8	28	(Belgium) Maxime Martin	PA	5
(Germany) GetSpeed Team JR286	Mercedes-AMG GT3 Evo	Mercedes-AMG M159 6.2 L V8	286	(United States) Patrick Liddy	Am	All
(Germany) GetSpeed Team JR286	Mercedes-AMG GT3 Evo	Mercedes-AMG M159 6.2 L V8	286	(Germany) Adam Osieka	Am	1–3, 5
(Germany) GetSpeed Team JR286	Mercedes-AMG GT3 Evo	Mercedes-AMG M159 6.2 L V8	286	(United States) Tanner Harvey	Am	2–5
(Germany) GetSpeed Team JR286	Mercedes-AMG GT3 Evo	Mercedes-AMG M159 6.2 L V8	286	(Luxembourg) Steve Jans	Am	2–5
(Germany) GetSpeed Team JR286	Mercedes-AMG GT3 Evo	Mercedes-AMG M159 6.2 L V8	286	(United States) Jon Hirshberg	Am	1, 4–5
(Germany) GetSpeed Team JR286	Mercedes-AMG GT3 Evo	Mercedes-AMG M159 6.2 L V8	286	(Australia) Andres Latorre	Am	1
(Italy) Pellin Racing	Ferrari 296 GT3	Ferrari F163CE 3.0 L Turbo V6	29	(United States) Lisa Clark	P	2, 4
(Italy) Pellin Racing	Ferrari 296 GT3	Ferrari F163CE 3.0 L Turbo V6	29	(Canada) Kyle Marcelli	P	2, 4
(Italy) Pellin Racing	Ferrari 296 GT3	Ferrari F163CE 3.0 L Turbo V6	29	(United States) Jeff Westphal	P	2, 4
(Italy) Pellin Racing	Ferrari 296 GT3	Ferrari F163CE 3.0 L Turbo V6	29	(Australia) Andres Latorre	P	2
(Italy) Pellin Racing	Ferrari 296 GT3	Ferrari F163CE 3.0 L Turbo V6	29	(United States) Massimo Perrina	P	4
(Belgium) Comtoyou Racing	Aston Martin Vantage AMR GT3 Evo	Mercedes-Benz M177 4.0 L Turbo V8	40	(Netherlands) Tom Coronel	PA	2
(Belgium) Comtoyou Racing	Aston Martin Vantage AMR GT3 Evo	Mercedes-Benz M177 4.0 L Turbo V8	40	(Netherlands) Jan Jaap van Roon	PA	2
(Belgium) Comtoyou Racing	Aston Martin Vantage AMR GT3 Evo	Mercedes-Benz M177 4.0 L Turbo V8	41	(Belgium) Nicolas Baert	Am	2
(Belgium) Comtoyou Racing	Aston Martin Vantage AMR GT3 Evo	Mercedes-Benz M177 4.0 L Turbo V8	41	(Belgium) Xavier Knauf	Am	2
(Belgium) Comtoyou Racing	Aston Martin Vantage AMR GT3 Evo	Mercedes-Benz M177 4.0 L Turbo V8	41	(Belgium) Gregory Servais	Am	2
(Slovakia) ARC Bratislava	Lamborghini Huracán GT3 Evo 1, 4 Lamborghini Huracán GT3 Evo 2 2	Lamborghini DGF 5.2 L V10	44	(Slovakia) Adam Konôpka	Am	1–2, 4
(Slovakia) ARC Bratislava	Lamborghini Huracán GT3 Evo 1, 4 Lamborghini Huracán GT3 Evo 2 2	Lamborghini DGF 5.2 L V10	44	(Slovakia) Miro Konôpka	Am	1–2, 4
(Slovakia) ARC Bratislava	Lamborghini Huracán GT3 Evo 1, 4 Lamborghini Huracán GT3 Evo 2 2	Lamborghini DGF 5.2 L V10	44	(Austria) Gerhard Tweraser	Am	1–2
(Slovakia) ARC Bratislava	Lamborghini Huracán GT3 Evo 1, 4 Lamborghini Huracán GT3 Evo 2 2	Lamborghini DGF 5.2 L V10	44	(Slovakia) Zdeno Mikulasko	Am	1, 4
(Slovakia) ARC Bratislava	Lamborghini Huracán GT3 Evo 1, 4 Lamborghini Huracán GT3 Evo 2 2	Lamborghini DGF 5.2 L V10	44	(Slovakia) Matej Konopka	Am	2, 4
(Italy) MP Racing	Mercedes-AMG GT3 Evo	Mercedes-AMG M159 6.2 L V8	58	(Italy) Corinna Gostner	Am	1–3
(Italy) MP Racing	Mercedes-AMG GT3 Evo	Mercedes-AMG M159 6.2 L V8	58	(Italy) David Gostner	Am	1–3
(Italy) MP Racing	Mercedes-AMG GT3 Evo	Mercedes-AMG M159 6.2 L V8	58	(Italy) Manuela Gostner	Am	1–3
(Italy) MP Racing	Mercedes-AMG GT3 Evo	Mercedes-AMG M159 6.2 L V8	58	(Italy) Thomas Gostner	Am	1–3
(Malaysia) Viper Niza Racing	Mercedes-AMG GT3 Evo	Mercedes-AMG M159 6.2 L V8	65	(Malaysia) Dominic Ang	Am	All
(Malaysia) Viper Niza Racing	Mercedes-AMG GT3 Evo	Mercedes-AMG M159 6.2 L V8	65	(Malaysia) Douglas Khoo	Am	All
(Malaysia) Viper Niza Racing	Mercedes-AMG GT3 Evo	Mercedes-AMG M159 6.2 L V8	65	(Malaysia) Melvin Moh	Am	1, 3–5
(Malaysia) Viper Niza Racing	Mercedes-AMG GT3 Evo	Mercedes-AMG M159 6.2 L V8	65	(Malaysia) Aaron Lim Say Joon	Am	2, 5
(United Kingdom) Continental Racing by Simpson Motorsport	Audi R8 LMS Evo II	Audi DAR 5.2 L V10	69	(Germany) Paul Scheuschner	Am	All
(United Kingdom) Continental Racing by Simpson Motorsport	Audi R8 LMS Evo II	Audi DAR 5.2 L V10	69	(Cyprus) Vasily Vladykin	Am	All
(United Kingdom) Continental Racing by Simpson Motorsport	Audi R8 LMS Evo II	Audi DAR 5.2 L V10	69	(Germany) Alex Aka	Am	1–4
(United Kingdom) Continental Racing by Simpson Motorsport	Audi R8 LMS Evo II	Audi DAR 5.2 L V10	69	(Germany) Florian Scholze	Am	1
(United Kingdom) Continental Racing by Simpson Motorsport	Audi R8 LMS Evo II	Audi DAR 5.2 L V10	69	(India) Akhil Agarwal	Am	2
(United Kingdom) Continental Racing by Simpson Motorsport	Audi R8 LMS Evo II	Audi DAR 5.2 L V10	69	(Paraguay) Miguel María García	Am	3–5
(United Kingdom) Continental Racing by Simpson Motorsport	Audi R8 LMS Evo II	Audi DAR 5.2 L V10	69	(United Kingdom) Hugo Cook	Am	5
(Lithuania) Juta Racing	Audi R8 LMS Evo II	Audi DAR 5.2 L V10	71	(Lithuania) Arunas Geciauskas	Am	3
(Lithuania) Juta Racing	Audi R8 LMS Evo II	Audi DAR 5.2 L V10	71	(Italy) Nicola Michelon	Am	3
(Lithuania) Juta Racing	Audi R8 LMS Evo II	Audi DAR 5.2 L V10	71	(Greece) Zois Skrimpias	Am	3
(Lithuania) Juta Racing	Audi R8 LMS Evo II	Audi DAR 5.2 L V10	71	(Australia) Andres Latorre	Am	4–5
(Lithuania) Juta Racing	Audi R8 LMS Evo II	Audi DAR 5.2 L V10	71	(Lithuania) Leonardas Dirzys	Am	4
(Lithuania) Juta Racing	Audi R8 LMS Evo II	Audi DAR 5.2 L V10	71	(Germany) Lutz Obermann	Am	4
(Lithuania) Juta Racing	Audi R8 LMS Evo II	Audi DAR 5.2 L V10	71	(China) Liang Jiatong	Am	5
(Lithuania) Juta Racing	Audi R8 LMS Evo II	Audi DAR 5.2 L V10	71	(United Kingdom) Gavin Pickering	Am	5
(Lithuania) Juta Racing	Audi R8 LMS Evo II	Audi DAR 5.2 L V10	71	(China) Zhang Yaqi	Am	5
(Lithuania) Juta Racing	Audi R8 LMS Evo II	Audi DAR 5.2 L V10	71	(China) Eric Z.	Am	5
(Lithuania) Juta Racing	Audi R8 LMS Evo II	Audi DAR 5.2 L V10	72	(Australia) Andres Latorre	PA	3
(Lithuania) Juta Racing	Audi R8 LMS Evo II	Audi DAR 5.2 L V10	72	(Lithuania) Domas Raudonis	PA	3
(Lithuania) Juta Racing	Audi R8 LMS Evo II	Audi DAR 5.2 L V10	72	(United States) Marc Sharinn	PA	3
(Lithuania) Juta Racing	Audi R8 LMS Evo II	Audi DAR 5.2 L V10	72	(United States) Tyler Sharinn	PA	3
(Germany) Proton Competition	Porsche 911 GT3 R (992.2)	Porsche M97/80 4.2 L Flat-6	73	(Germany) Jörg Dreisow	PA	1–4
(Germany) Proton Competition	Porsche 911 GT3 R (992.2)	Porsche M97/80 4.2 L Flat-6	73	(Germany) Constantin Dressler	PA	1–4
(Germany) Proton Competition	Porsche 911 GT3 R (992.2)	Porsche M97/80 4.2 L Flat-6	73	(Germany) Manuel Lauck	PA	1–4
(Germany) Proton Competition	Porsche 911 GT3 R (992.2)	Porsche M97/80 4.2 L Flat-6	73	(Germany) Joel Sturm	PA	3–4
(Germany) Proton Competition	Porsche 911 GT3 R (992.2)	Porsche M97/80 4.2 L Flat-6	73	(Germany) Dennis Marschall	PA	1
(Germany) Proton Competition	Porsche 911 GT3 R (992.2)	Porsche M97/80 4.2 L Flat-6	73	(Netherlands) Robert de Haan	PA	2
(United Kingdom) Optimum Motorsport	McLaren 720S GT3 Evo	McLaren M840T 4.0 Turbo V8	77	(Germany) Salman Owega	P	2
(United Kingdom) Optimum Motorsport	McLaren 720S GT3 Evo	McLaren M840T 4.0 Turbo V8	77	(United Kingdom) Morgan Tillbrook	P	2
(United Kingdom) Optimum Motorsport	McLaren 720S GT3 Evo	McLaren M840T 4.0 Turbo V8	77	(United Kingdom) Freddie Tomlinson	P	2
(United States) Era Motorsport	Ferrari 296 GT3 1–2; Ferrari 296 GT3 Evo 3–5	Ferrari F163CE 3.0 L Turbo V6	81	(United Kingdom) Oliver Bryant	PA	All
(United States) Era Motorsport	Ferrari 296 GT3 1–2; Ferrari 296 GT3 Evo 3–5	Ferrari F163CE 3.0 L Turbo V6	81	(United States) Ryan Dalziel	PA	All
(United States) Era Motorsport	Ferrari 296 GT3 1–2; Ferrari 296 GT3 Evo 3–5	Ferrari F163CE 3.0 L Turbo V6	81	(United Kingdom) Jake Hill	PA	All
(United States) Era Motorsport	Ferrari 296 GT3 1–2; Ferrari 296 GT3 Evo 3–5	Ferrari F163CE 3.0 L Turbo V6	81	(United States) Dwight Merriman	PA	All
(Germany) Up2Race	Porsche 911 GT3 R (992.2)	Porsche M97/80 4.2 L Flat-6	88	(Germany) Fabio Grosse	P	4–5
(Germany) Up2Race	Porsche 911 GT3 R (992.2)	Porsche M97/80 4.2 L Flat-6	88	(Germany) Tim Heinemann	P	4–5
(Germany) Up2Race	Porsche 911 GT3 R (992.2)	Porsche M97/80 4.2 L Flat-6	88	(Ukraine) Oleksiy Kikireshko	P	4–5
(Germany) Up2Race	Porsche 911 GT3 R (992.2)	Porsche M97/80 4.2 L Flat-6	88	(Germany) Alfred Renauer	P	5
(Spain) E2P Racing	Aston Martin Vantage AMR GT3 Evo	Mercedes-Benz M177 4.0 L Turbo V8	90	(Spain) Pablo Burguera	Am	1–4
(Spain) E2P Racing	Aston Martin Vantage AMR GT3 Evo	Mercedes-Benz M177 4.0 L Turbo V8	90	(Spain) Oliver Campos	Am	1–4
(Spain) E2P Racing	Aston Martin Vantage AMR GT3 Evo	Mercedes-Benz M177 4.0 L Turbo V8	90	(Spain) Antonio Sainero	Am	1–4
(Spain) E2P Racing	Aston Martin Vantage AMR GT3 Evo	Mercedes-Benz M177 4.0 L Turbo V8	90	(Spain) Pablo Burguera	PA	5
(Spain) E2P Racing	Aston Martin Vantage AMR GT3 Evo	Mercedes-Benz M177 4.0 L Turbo V8	90	(Spain) Oliver Campos	PA	5
(Spain) E2P Racing	Aston Martin Vantage AMR GT3 Evo	Mercedes-Benz M177 4.0 L Turbo V8	90	(Portugal) Henrique Chaves	PA	5
(Spain) E2P Racing	Aston Martin Vantage AMR GT3 Evo	Mercedes-Benz M177 4.0 L Turbo V8	90	(Spain) Antonio Sainero	PA	5
(Germany) Herberth Motorsport	Porsche 911 GT3 R (992.2)	Porsche M97/80 4.2 L Flat-6	91	(Germany) Ralf Bohn	PA	1
(Germany) Herberth Motorsport	Porsche 911 GT3 R (992.2)	Porsche M97/80 4.2 L Flat-6	91	(Switzerland) Rolf Ineichen	PA	1
(Germany) Herberth Motorsport	Porsche 911 GT3 R (992.2)	Porsche M97/80 4.2 L Flat-6	91	(Germany) Alfred Renauer	PA	1
(Germany) Herberth Motorsport	Porsche 911 GT3 R (992.2)	Porsche M97/80 4.2 L Flat-6	269	(Germany) Max Moritz	PA	1–2
(Germany) Herberth Motorsport	Porsche 911 GT3 R (992.2)	Porsche M97/80 4.2 L Flat-6	269	(Germany) Vincent Kolb	PA	1
(Germany) Herberth Motorsport	Porsche 911 GT3 R (992.2)	Porsche M97/80 4.2 L Flat-6	269	(Germany) Robert Renauer	PA	1
(Germany) Herberth Motorsport	Porsche 911 GT3 R (992.2)	Porsche M97/80 4.2 L Flat-6	269	(Austria) Klaus Bachler	PA	2
(Germany) Herberth Motorsport	Porsche 911 GT3 R (992.2)	Porsche M97/80 4.2 L Flat-6	269	(Germany) Alfred Renauer	PA	2
(India) Ajith RedAnt Racing	Mercedes-AMG GT3 Evo	Mercedes-AMG M159 6.2 L V8	93	(Belgium) Kobe de Breucker	PA	All
(India) Ajith RedAnt Racing	Mercedes-AMG GT3 Evo	Mercedes-AMG M159 6.2 L V8	93	(India) Ajith Kumar	PA	All
(India) Ajith RedAnt Racing	Mercedes-AMG GT3 Evo	Mercedes-AMG M159 6.2 L V8	93	(Belgium) Ayrton Redant	PA	All
(India) Ajith RedAnt Racing	Mercedes-AMG GT3 Evo	Mercedes-AMG M159 6.2 L V8	93	(Belgium) Yannick Redant	PA	All
(India) Ajith RedAnt Racing	Mercedes-AMG GT3 Evo	Mercedes-AMG M159 6.2 L V8	93	(Canada) Mikaël Grenier	PA	5
(Slovakia) Gamota Racing	BMW M4 GT3 Evo	BMW P58 3.0 L I6	500	(Germany) Felipe Fernández Laser	P	5
(Slovakia) Gamota Racing	BMW M4 GT3 Evo	BMW P58 3.0 L I6	500	(Germany) David Jahn	P	5
(Slovakia) Gamota Racing	BMW M4 GT3 Evo	BMW P58 3.0 L I6	500	(Germany) Moritz Kranz	P	5
(Slovakia) Gamota Racing	BMW M4 GT3 Evo	BMW P58 3.0 L I6	500	(Finland) Jesse Krohn	P	5
(Slovakia) Gamota Racing	BMW M4 GT3 Evo	BMW P58 3.0 L I6	500	(Slovakia) Antal Zsigó	P	5

Icon	Class
P	GT3-Pro
PA	GT3-Pro Am
Am	GT3-Am

=== GTX ===
Team	Car	Engine	No.	Drivers	Rounds
(France) Vortex V8	Vortex 2.0	Chevrolet LS3 6.2 L V8	701	(France) Philippe Bonnel	1–3, 5
(France) Vortex V8	Vortex 2.0	Chevrolet LS3 6.2 L V8	701	(France) Julien Boillot	2–3, 5
(France) Vortex V8	Vortex 2.0	Chevrolet LS3 6.2 L V8	701	(France) Alexandre De Bernardinis	2–3
(France) Vortex V8	Vortex 2.0	Chevrolet LS3 6.2 L V8	701	(France) Arnoud Gomez	1
(France) Vortex V8	Vortex 2.0	Chevrolet LS3 6.2 L V8	701	(France) Olivier Gomez	1
(France) Vortex V8	Vortex 2.0	Chevrolet LS3 6.2 L V8	701	(France) Thierry Chkondali	5
(France) Vortex V8	Vortex 2.0	Chevrolet LS3 6.2 L V8	701	(France) Marc Girard	5
(France) Vortex V8	Vortex 2.0	Chevrolet LS3 6.2 L V8	701	(Canada) Michel Sallenbach	5
(France) Vortex V8	Vortex 2.0	Chevrolet LS3 6.2 L V8	702	(France) Thierry Chkondali	2
(France) Vortex V8	Vortex 2.0	Chevrolet LS3 6.2 L V8	702	(France) Marc Girard	2
(France) Vortex V8	Vortex 2.0	Chevrolet LS3 6.2 L V8	702	(Canada) Michel Sallenbach	2
(Spain) NM Racing Team	Mercedes-AMG GT2	Mercedes-AMG M178 4.0 L Turbo V8	715	(Spain) Alberto de Martín	2
(Spain) NM Racing Team	Mercedes-AMG GT2	Mercedes-AMG M178 4.0 L Turbo V8	715	(Spain) Manel Lao Cornago	2
(Spain) NM Racing Team	Mercedes-AMG GT2	Mercedes-AMG M178 4.0 L Turbo V8	715	(Spain) Nil Montserrat	2
(Denmark) KEO Racing	Ligier JS2 RS	Ford Ecoboost D35 3.5 L Turbo V6	743	(United Kingdom) Adrian Kunzle	4
(Denmark) KEO Racing	Ligier JS2 RS	Ford Ecoboost D35 3.5 L Turbo V6	743	(United States) Kevin Madsen	4
(Italy) Dinamic Motorsport	Maserati MC20 GT2	Maserati Nettuno 3.0 L Turbo V6	767	(Switzerland) Mauro Calamia	1
(Italy) Dinamic Motorsport	Maserati MC20 GT2	Maserati Nettuno 3.0 L Turbo V6	767	(Italy) Amedeo Pampanini	1
(Italy) Dinamic Motorsport	Maserati MC20 GT2	Maserati Nettuno 3.0 L Turbo V6	767	(Italy) Roberto Pampanini	1

=== 992 ===
Team	Car	Engine	No.	Drivers	Class	Rounds
(France) SebLajoux Racing	Porsche 992 GT3 Cup (992.1)	Porsche 4.0 L Flat-6	888	(France) Sebastien Lajoux	Am	All
(France) SebLajoux Racing	Porsche 992 GT3 Cup (992.1)	Porsche 4.0 L Flat-6	888	(France) Stéphane Perrin	Am	All
(France) SebLajoux Racing	Porsche 992 GT3 Cup (992.1)	Porsche 4.0 L Flat-6	888	(United Kingdom) Anthony Vince	Am	All
(France) SebLajoux Racing	Porsche 992 GT3 Cup (992.1)	Porsche 4.0 L Flat-6	888	(France) Louis Perrot	Am	1, 3
(France) SebLajoux Racing	Porsche 992 GT3 Cup (992.1)	Porsche 4.0 L Flat-6	888	(France) Jerome Boullery	Am	2
(France) SebLajoux Racing	Porsche 992 GT3 Cup (992.1)	Porsche 4.0 L Flat-6	888	(France) Enzo Joulié	Am	2
(France) SebLajoux Racing	Porsche 992 GT3 Cup (992.1)	Porsche 4.0 L Flat-6	888	(Netherlands) Paul Meijer	Am	4
(France) SebLajoux Racing	Porsche 992 GT3 Cup (992.1)	Porsche 4.0 L Flat-6	888	(Luxembourg) Carlos Rivas	Am	4
(France) SebLajoux Racing	Porsche 992 GT3 Cup (992.1)	Porsche 4.0 L Flat-6	888	(Netherlands) Wouter Boerekamps	Am	5
(France) SebLajoux Racing	Porsche 992 GT3 Cup (992.1)	Porsche 4.0 L Flat-6	888	(Netherlands) Ralph Poppelaars	Am	5
(France) SebLajoux Racing	Porsche 992 GT3 Cup (992.1)	Porsche 4.0 L Flat-6	910	(France) Lionel Amrouche	Am	1–3, 5
(France) SebLajoux Racing	Porsche 992 GT3 Cup (992.1)	Porsche 4.0 L Flat-6	910	(United Kingdom) Rhys Lloyd	Am	1, 5
(France) SebLajoux Racing	Porsche 992 GT3 Cup (992.1)	Porsche 4.0 L Flat-6	910	(Switzerland) Yannick Mettler	Am	1, 5
(France) SebLajoux Racing	Porsche 992 GT3 Cup (992.1)	Porsche 4.0 L Flat-6	910	(France) Sebastien Lajoux	Am	2, 5
(France) SebLajoux Racing	Porsche 992 GT3 Cup (992.1)	Porsche 4.0 L Flat-6	910	(France) Jerome Boullery	Am	2
(France) SebLajoux Racing	Porsche 992 GT3 Cup (992.1)	Porsche 4.0 L Flat-6	910	(Belgium) Gary Terclavers	Am	2
(France) SebLajoux Racing	Porsche 992 GT3 Cup (992.1)	Porsche 4.0 L Flat-6	910	(Belgium) Alessandro Tudisca	Am	2
(France) SebLajoux Racing	Porsche 992 GT3 Cup (992.1)	Porsche 4.0 L Flat-6	910	(France) Tim Merieux	Am	3
(France) SebLajoux Racing	Porsche 992 GT3 Cup (992.1)	Porsche 4.0 L Flat-6	910	(France) Loïc Teire	Am	3
(France) SebLajoux Racing	Porsche 992 GT3 Cup (992.1)	Porsche 4.0 L Flat-6	910	(Latvia) Ivars Vallers	Am	5
(Denmark) Holmgaard Motorsport	Porsche 992 GT3 Cup (992.1)	Porsche 4.0 L Flat-6	902	(Denmark) Jonas Holmgaard	Am	2, 5
(Denmark) Holmgaard Motorsport	Porsche 992 GT3 Cup (992.1)	Porsche 4.0 L Flat-6	902	(Denmark) Magnus Holmgaard	Am	2, 5
(Denmark) Holmgaard Motorsport	Porsche 992 GT3 Cup (992.1)	Porsche 4.0 L Flat-6	902	(Norway) Roy Arild Edland	Am	2
(Denmark) Holmgaard Motorsport	Porsche 992 GT3 Cup (992.1)	Porsche 4.0 L Flat-6	902	(Denmark) Martin Vedel Mortensen	Am	2
(Denmark) Holmgaard Motorsport	Porsche 992 GT3 Cup (992.1)	Porsche 4.0 L Flat-6	902	(Sweden) Erik Behrens	Am	5
(Denmark) Holmgaard Motorsport	Porsche 992 GT3 Cup (992.1)	Porsche 4.0 L Flat-6	902	(Netherlands) Hjelte Hoﬀner	Am	5
(Denmark) Holmgaard Motorsport	Porsche 992 GT3 Cup (992.1)	Porsche 4.0 L Flat-6	902	(Germany) Lutz Obermann	Am	5
(Belgium) Mühlner Motorsport	Porsche 992 GT3 Cup (992.1)	Porsche 4.0 L Flat-6	904	(Germany) Marcus Menden	Am	4
(Belgium) Mühlner Motorsport	Porsche 992 GT3 Cup (992.1)	Porsche 4.0 L Flat-6	904	(Switzerland) Silvain Pastoris	Am	4
(Belgium) Mühlner Motorsport	Porsche 992 GT3 Cup (992.1)	Porsche 4.0 L Flat-6	904	(El Salvador) Rolando Saca	Am	4
(Belgium) Mühlner Motorsport	Porsche 992 GT3 Cup (992.1)	Porsche 4.0 L Flat-6	921	(Denmark) Conrad Tox Leveau	P	All
(Belgium) Mühlner Motorsport	Porsche 992 GT3 Cup (992.1)	Porsche 4.0 L Flat-6	921	(Estonia) Martin Rump	P	All
(Belgium) Mühlner Motorsport	Porsche 992 GT3 Cup (992.1)	Porsche 4.0 L Flat-6	921	(France) Joshua Bednarski	P	3–5
(Belgium) Mühlner Motorsport	Porsche 992 GT3 Cup (992.1)	Porsche 4.0 L Flat-6	921	(Netherlands) Paul Meijer	P	1
(Belgium) Mühlner Motorsport	Porsche 992 GT3 Cup (992.1)	Porsche 4.0 L Flat-6	921	(Germany) Julian Hanses	P	2
(Belgium) Mühlner Motorsport	Porsche 992 GT3 Cup (992.1)	Porsche 4.0 L Flat-6	921	(Germany) Tim Scheerbarth	P	2
(Germany) RPM Racing	Porsche 992 GT3 Cup (992.1)	Porsche 4.0 L Flat-6	907	(Germany) Philip Hamprecht	Am	All
(Germany) RPM Racing	Porsche 992 GT3 Cup (992.1)	Porsche 4.0 L Flat-6	907	(Sweden) Niclas Jönsson	Am	All
(Germany) RPM Racing	Porsche 992 GT3 Cup (992.1)	Porsche 4.0 L Flat-6	907	(United States) Tracy Krohn	Am	All
(Germany) RPM Racing	Porsche 992 GT3 Cup (992.1)	Porsche 4.0 L Flat-6	907	(Netherlands) Patrick Huisman	Am	5
(Netherlands) Red Camel-Jordans.nl	Porsche 992 GT3 Cup (992.1)	Porsche 4.0 L Flat-6	909	(Netherlands) Ivo Breukers	P	All
(Netherlands) Red Camel-Jordans.nl	Porsche 992 GT3 Cup (992.1)	Porsche 4.0 L Flat-6	909	(Netherlands) Luc Breukers	P	All
(Netherlands) Red Camel-Jordans.nl	Porsche 992 GT3 Cup (992.1)	Porsche 4.0 L Flat-6	909	(Netherlands) Rik Breukers	P	All
(Netherlands) Red Camel-Jordans.nl	Porsche 992 GT3 Cup (992.1)	Porsche 4.0 L Flat-6	909	(Switzerland) Fabian Denz	P	All
(Italy) The Driving Experiences	Porsche 992 GT3 Cup (992.1)	Porsche 4.0 L Flat-6	911	(Italy) Francesco Fenici	Am	1–3
(Italy) The Driving Experiences	Porsche 992 GT3 Cup (992.1)	Porsche 4.0 L Flat-6	911	(Switzerland) Ivan Jacoma	Am	1–3
(Italy) The Driving Experiences	Porsche 992 GT3 Cup (992.1)	Porsche 4.0 L Flat-6	911	(Switzerland) Valerio Presezzi	Am	1–3
(France) Chazel Technologie Course	Porsche 992 GT3 Cup (992.1)	Porsche 4.0 L Flat-6	920	(France) Antoni de Barn	Am	1–4
(France) Chazel Technologie Course	Porsche 992 GT3 Cup (992.1)	Porsche 4.0 L Flat-6	920	(France) Jean-Paul Dominici	Am	1–4
(France) Chazel Technologie Course	Porsche 992 GT3 Cup (992.1)	Porsche 4.0 L Flat-6	920	(France) Jean-Mathieu Leandri	Am	1–4
(France) Chazel Technologie Course	Porsche 992 GT3 Cup (992.1)	Porsche 4.0 L Flat-6	994	(France) Alain Jacono	Am	3
(France) Chazel Technologie Course	Porsche 992 GT3 Cup (992.1)	Porsche 4.0 L Flat-6	994	(France) Laurent Roncaglia	Am	3
(France) Chazel Technologie Course	Porsche 992 GT3 Cup (992.1)	Porsche 4.0 L Flat-6	994	(France) Lucas Sugliano	Am	3
(Belgium) MM Racing Team	Porsche 992 GT3 Cup (992.1)	Porsche 4.0 L Flat-6	923	(Belgium) Mick Meurrens	P	2
(Belgium) MM Racing Team	Porsche 992 GT3 Cup (992.1)	Porsche 4.0 L Flat-6	923	(Belgium) Steve Meurrens	P	2
(Belgium) MM Racing Team	Porsche 992 GT3 Cup (992.1)	Porsche 4.0 L Flat-6	923	(Belgium) Tom Meurrens	P	2
(Belgium) MM Racing Team	Porsche 992 GT3 Cup (992.1)	Porsche 4.0 L Flat-6	923	(Belgium) Mick Meurrens	Am	4
(Belgium) MM Racing Team	Porsche 992 GT3 Cup (992.1)	Porsche 4.0 L Flat-6	923	(Belgium) Steve Meurrens	Am	4
(Belgium) MM Racing Team	Porsche 992 GT3 Cup (992.1)	Porsche 4.0 L Flat-6	923	(Belgium) Tom Meurrens	Am	4
(Netherlands) Van Berlo Motorsport by CP Motorsport	Porsche 992 GT3 Cup (992.1)	Porsche 4.0 L Flat-6	925	(Netherlands) Glenn van Berlo	Am	3–4
(Netherlands) Van Berlo Motorsport by CP Motorsport	Porsche 992 GT3 Cup (992.1)	Porsche 4.0 L Flat-6	925	(Netherlands) Marcel van Berlo	Am	3–4
(Netherlands) Van Berlo Motorsport by CP Motorsport	Porsche 992 GT3 Cup (992.1)	Porsche 4.0 L Flat-6	925	(Netherlands) Bart van Helden	Am	3–4
(Netherlands) Van Berlo Motorsport by CP Motorsport	Porsche 992 GT3 Cup (992.1)	Porsche 4.0 L Flat-6	925	(Netherlands) Glenn van Berlo	P	5
(Netherlands) Van Berlo Motorsport by CP Motorsport	Porsche 992 GT3 Cup (992.1)	Porsche 4.0 L Flat-6	925	(Netherlands) Kay van Berlo	P	5
(Netherlands) Van Berlo Motorsport by CP Motorsport	Porsche 992 GT3 Cup (992.1)	Porsche 4.0 L Flat-6	925	(Netherlands) Marcel van Berlo	P	5
(Netherlands) Van Berlo Motorsport by CP Motorsport	Porsche 992 GT3 Cup (992.1)	Porsche 4.0 L Flat-6	925	(Netherlands) Bart van Helden	P	5
(Germany) HRT Performance	Porsche 992 GT3 Cup (992.1)	Porsche 4.0 L Flat-6	928	(United Kingdom) Steven Gambrell	Am	All
(Germany) HRT Performance	Porsche 992 GT3 Cup (992.1)	Porsche 4.0 L Flat-6	928	(Republic of Ireland) Jonathan Kearney	Am	All
(Germany) HRT Performance	Porsche 992 GT3 Cup (992.1)	Porsche 4.0 L Flat-6	928	(Portugal) Igor Sorokin	Am	All
(Germany) HRT Performance	Porsche 992 GT3 Cup (992.1)	Porsche 4.0 L Flat-6	928	(United Kingdom) James Kellett	Am	2–5
(Germany) HRT Performance	Porsche 992 GT3 Cup (992.1)	Porsche 4.0 L Flat-6	930	(Republic of Ireland) Akhil Agarwal	Am	3
(Germany) HRT Performance	Porsche 992 GT3 Cup (992.1)	Porsche 4.0 L Flat-6	930	(Australia) Seth Gilmore	Am	3
(Germany) HRT Performance	Porsche 992 GT3 Cup (992.1)	Porsche 4.0 L Flat-6	930	(Portugal) Eurico Pacheco	Am	3
(Germany) HRT Performance	Porsche 992 GT3 Cup (992.1)	Porsche 4.0 L Flat-6	930	(France) Maxime Blanchemain	Am	5
(Germany) HRT Performance	Porsche 992 GT3 Cup (992.1)	Porsche 4.0 L Flat-6	930	(United States) Gregg Gorski	Am	5
(Germany) HRT Performance	Porsche 992 GT3 Cup (992.1)	Porsche 4.0 L Flat-6	930	(Portugal) Marcus Graichen	Am	5
(Germany) HRT Performance	Porsche 992 GT3 Cup (992.1)	Porsche 4.0 L Flat-6	930	(United Kingdom) JM Littman	Am	5
(Germany) HRT Performance	Porsche 992 GT3 Cup (992.1)	Porsche 4.0 L Flat-6	930	(Belgium) Gilles Thiers	Am	5
(Qatar) QMMF by HRT Performance	Porsche 992 GT3 Cup (992.1)	Porsche 4.0 L Flat-6	974	(Qatar) Ahmed Al-Emadi	Am	1–3, 5
(Qatar) QMMF by HRT Performance	Porsche 992 GT3 Cup (992.1)	Porsche 4.0 L Flat-6	974	(Qatar) Faesal Al Yafei	Am	1–3, 5
(Qatar) QMMF by HRT Performance	Porsche 992 GT3 Cup (992.1)	Porsche 4.0 L Flat-6	974	(Qatar) Abdulla Ali Al-Khelaifi	Am	1–2, 5
(Qatar) QMMF by HRT Performance	Porsche 992 GT3 Cup (992.1)	Porsche 4.0 L Flat-6	974	(Qatar) Ghanim Al Ali	Am	3
(Qatar) QMMF by HRT Performance	Porsche 992 GT3 Cup (992.1)	Porsche 4.0 L Flat-6	974	(Qatar) Jassim Al-Thani	Am	5
(Qatar) QMMF by HRT Performance	Porsche 992 GT3 Cup (992.1)	Porsche 4.0 L Flat-6	974	(Germany) Julian Hanses	Am	5
(France) Crubilé Sport	Porsche 992 GT3 Cup (992.1)	Porsche 4.0 L Flat-6	935	(France) Sebastien Crubile	Am	2
(France) Crubilé Sport	Porsche 992 GT3 Cup (992.1)	Porsche 4.0 L Flat-6	935	(France) Pascal Duhamel	Am	2
(Spain) Escuderia Faraon	Porsche 992 GT3 Cup (992.1)	Porsche 4.0 L Flat-6	949	(Spain) Pedro Miguel Lourinho Bras	Am	2
(Spain) Escuderia Faraon	Porsche 992 GT3 Cup (992.1)	Porsche 4.0 L Flat-6	949	(Spain) Fernando Gonzalez Gonzalez	Am	2
(Spain) Escuderia Faraon	Porsche 992 GT3 Cup (992.1)	Porsche 4.0 L Flat-6	949	(Spain) Pablo Bras Silvero	Am	2
(Switzerland) Orchid Racing Team	Porsche 992 GT3 Cup (992.1)	Porsche 4.0 L Flat-6	963	(France) Antoine Leclerc	P	3
(Switzerland) Orchid Racing Team	Porsche 992 GT3 Cup (992.1)	Porsche 4.0 L Flat-6	963	(Switzerland) Alexandre Mottet	P	3
(Switzerland) Orchid Racing Team	Porsche 992 GT3 Cup (992.1)	Porsche 4.0 L Flat-6	963	(Switzerland) Loic Villiger	P	3

Icon	Class
P	992-Pro
Am	992-Am

=== GT4 ===
Team	Car	Engine	No.	Drivers	Rounds
(Germany) Team Sorg Rennsport	Porsche 718 Cayman GT4 RS Clubsport	Porsche MDG 4.0 L Flat-6	426	(Netherlands) Norbert Dekker	5
(Germany) Team Sorg Rennsport	Porsche 718 Cayman GT4 RS Clubsport	Porsche MDG 4.0 L Flat-6	426	(Germany) Maximilian Hill	5
(Germany) Team Sorg Rennsport	Porsche 718 Cayman GT4 RS Clubsport	Porsche MDG 4.0 L Flat-6	426	(Mexico) Chara Mansur	5
(Germany) Team Sorg Rennsport	Porsche 718 Cayman GT4 RS Clubsport	Porsche MDG 4.0 L Flat-6	426	(Mexico) Benito Tagle	5
(Switzerland) Hofor Racing by Bonk Motorsport	BMW M4 GT4 Evo (G82)	BMW S58B30T0 3.0 L Turbo I6	431	(Germany) Michael Bonk	4
(Switzerland) Hofor Racing by Bonk Motorsport	BMW M4 GT4 Evo (G82)	BMW S58B30T0 3.0 L Turbo I6	431	(Germany) Claudia Hürtgen	4
(Switzerland) Hofor Racing by Bonk Motorsport	BMW M4 GT4 Evo (G82)	BMW S58B30T0 3.0 L Turbo I6	431	(Switzerland) Martin Kroll	4
(Switzerland) Hofor Racing by Bonk Motorsport	BMW M4 GT4 Evo (G82)	BMW S58B30T0 3.0 L Turbo I6	431	(Germany) Elia Weiss	4
(France) Circuit Toys	Toyota GR Supra GT4 Evo2	BMW B58B30 3.0 L Turbo I6	444	(Netherlands) Norbert Dekker	3
(France) Circuit Toys	Toyota GR Supra GT4 Evo2	BMW B58B30 3.0 L Turbo I6	444	(France) Olivier Huez	3
(France) Circuit Toys	Toyota GR Supra GT4 Evo2	BMW B58B30 3.0 L Turbo I6	444	(France) Hugo Poppe	3
(France) Circuit Toys	Toyota GR Supra GT4 Evo2	BMW B58B30 3.0 L Turbo I6	444	(Netherlands) Johan de Rouw	3
(Netherlands) CP Motorsport	BMW M4 GT4 (G82)	BMW S58B30T0 3.0 L Turbo I6	483	(Netherlands) Patrick Grootscholten	5
(Netherlands) CP Motorsport	BMW M4 GT4 (G82)	BMW S58B30T0 3.0 L Turbo I6	483	(Netherlands) Semo Keric	5
(Netherlands) CP Motorsport	BMW M4 GT4 (G82)	BMW S58B30T0 3.0 L Turbo I6	483	(Belgium) Pieter-Jan Lefevere	5
(Netherlands) CP Motorsport	BMW M4 GT4 (G82)	BMW S58B30T0 3.0 L Turbo I6	483	(Netherlands) Johan de Rouw	5
(Netherlands) CP Motorsport	BMW M4 GT4 (G82)	BMW S58B30T0 3.0 L Turbo I6	483	(Netherlands) Daaf Steentjes	5

=== TCE ===
Team	Car	Engine	No.	Drivers	Class	Rounds
(Germany) asBest Racing	Cupra León TCR	Volkswagen EA888 2.0 L I4	101	(Hong Kong) Samuel Hsieh	TX	2
(Germany) asBest Racing	Cupra León TCR	Volkswagen EA888 2.0 L I4	101	(Germany) Lutz Obermann	TX	2
(Germany) asBest Racing	Cupra León TCR	Volkswagen EA888 2.0 L I4	101	(Japan) Junichi Umemoto	TX	2
(Germany) asBest Racing	Cupra León TCR	Volkswagen EA888 2.0 L I4	101	(Germany) Moritz Rosenbach	TX	4
(Germany) asBest Racing	Cupra León TCR	Volkswagen EA888 2.0 L I4	101	(Germany) Henrik Seibel	TX	4
(Germany) asBest Racing	Cupra León TCR	Volkswagen EA888 2.0 L I4	101	(Belgium) Steven Teirlinck	TX	4
(Germany) asBest Racing	SEAT Leon Cup Racer	Volkswagen EA888 2.0 L I4	102	(Germany) Pia Ohlsson	TX	All
(Germany) asBest Racing	SEAT Leon Cup Racer	Volkswagen EA888 2.0 L I4	102	(Poland) Rafal Gieras	TX	1, 3–5
(Germany) asBest Racing	SEAT Leon Cup Racer	Volkswagen EA888 2.0 L I4	102	(Belgium) Steven Teirlinck	TX	2–3
(Germany) asBest Racing	SEAT Leon Cup Racer	Volkswagen EA888 2.0 L I4	102	(Germany) Jens Wulf	TX	2
(Germany) asBest Racing	SEAT Leon Cup Racer	Volkswagen EA888 2.0 L I4	102	(Switzerland) Thomas Alpiger	TX	1
(Germany) asBest Racing	SEAT Leon Cup Racer	Volkswagen EA888 2.0 L I4	102	(Switzerland) Michael Neuhauser	TX	4
(Germany) asBest Racing	SEAT Leon Cup Racer	Volkswagen EA888 2.0 L I4	102	(Hong Kong) Samuel Hsieh	TX	5
(Germany) asBest Racing	SEAT Leon Cup Racer	Volkswagen EA888 2.0 L I4	102	(Japan) Junichi Umemoto	TX	5
(Germany) asBest Racing	Porsche 718 Cayman GT4 CS (982)	Porsche 3.8 L Flat-6	111	(Brazil) Alexandre Dante	TX	4
(Germany) asBest Racing	Porsche 718 Cayman GT4 CS (982)	Porsche 3.8 L Flat-6	111	(Brazil) Cesar Fonseca	TX	4
(Germany) asBest Racing	Porsche 718 Cayman GT4 CS (982)	Porsche 3.8 L Flat-6	111	(Brazil) Silas Passos	TX	4
(Germany) asBest Racing	Porsche 718 Cayman GT4 CS (982)	Porsche 3.8 L Flat-6	111	(United States) Seth Brown	TX	5
(Germany) asBest Racing	Porsche 718 Cayman GT4 CS (982)	Porsche 3.8 L Flat-6	111	(Germany) Tobias Kracht	TX	5
(Germany) asBest Racing	Porsche 718 Cayman GT4 CS (982)	Porsche 3.8 L Flat-6	111	(Germany) Ole Scharp	TX	5
(Germany) asBest Racing	Porsche 718 Cayman GT4 CS (982)	Porsche 3.8 L Flat-6	111	(Belgium) Steven Teirlinck	TX	5
(Switzerland) Stanco&Tanner Motorsport	Cupra León TCR	Volkswagen EA888 2.0 L I4	112	(Switzerland) Christian Jakob	TX	5
(Switzerland) Stanco&Tanner Motorsport	Cupra León TCR	Volkswagen EA888 2.0 L I4	112	(Italy) Armando Stanco	TX	5
(Switzerland) Stanco&Tanner Motorsport	Cupra León TCR	Volkswagen EA888 2.0 L I4	112	(Italy) Dario Stanco	TX	5
(Switzerland) Stanco&Tanner Motorsport	Cupra León TCR	Volkswagen EA888 2.0 L I4	112	(Italy) Luigi Stanco	TX	5
(Switzerland) Stanco&Tanner Motorsport	Cupra León TCR	Volkswagen EA888 2.0 L I4	112	(Switzerland) Stefan Tanner	TX	5
(Italy) Not Only Motorsport	Ligier JS2 R	Ford Duratec 37 3.7 L V6	114	(Italy) Gino Rocchio	TX	All
(Italy) Not Only Motorsport	Ligier JS2 R	Ford Duratec 37 3.7 L V6	114	(Italy) Filippo Tornaghi	TX	All
(Italy) Not Only Motorsport	Ligier JS2 R	Ford Duratec 37 3.7 L V6	114	(France) Nathan Huet	TX	4–5
(Italy) Not Only Motorsport	Ligier JS2 R	Ford Duratec 37 3.7 L V6	114	(Italy) Giacomo Pollini	TX	5
(United States) THRW Honda Racing	Honda Civic Type R TCR (FL5)	Honda K20C1 2.0 L I4	123	(United States) Christian Hernandez	TX	5
(United States) THRW Honda Racing	Honda Civic Type R TCR (FL5)	Honda K20C1 2.0 L I4	123	(United States) Corey Taguchi	TX	5
(United States) THRW Honda Racing	Honda Civic Type R TCR (FL5)	Honda K20C1 2.0 L I4	123	(United States) Calvin Tam	TX	5
(United States) THRW Honda Racing	Honda Civic Type R TCR (FL5)	Honda K20C1 2.0 L I4	123	(United States) Weston Walter	TX	5
(United States) THRW Honda Racing	Honda Civic Type R TCR (FL5)	Honda K20C1 2.0 L I4	124	(Canada) Todd Chiappino	TX	5
(United States) THRW Honda Racing	Honda Civic Type R TCR (FL5)	Honda K20C1 2.0 L I4	124	(Canada) Lawrence Hwang	TX	5
(United States) THRW Honda Racing	Honda Civic Type R TCR (FL5)	Honda K20C1 2.0 L I4	124	(United States) Jeremy Lucas	TX	5
(United States) THRW Honda Racing	Honda Civic Type R TCR (FL5)	Honda K20C1 2.0 L I4	124	(Canada) Scott Nicol	TX	5
(United Kingdom) J-Mec Engineering	BMW M3 (E46)	BMW 3.0 L I4	133	(United Kingdom) Kevin Clarke	TX	2
(United Kingdom) J-Mec Engineering	BMW M3 (E46)	BMW 3.0 L I4	133	(United Kingdom) James Collins	TX	2
(United Kingdom) J-Mec Engineering	BMW M3 (E46)	BMW 3.0 L I4	133	(United Kingdom) Oliver Smith	TX	2
(Netherlands) JW Raceservice	Audi RS 3 LMS TCR (2017)	Volkswagen EA888 2.0 L I4	135	(Netherlands) Robert Gielisse	TX	2
(Netherlands) JW Raceservice	Audi RS 3 LMS TCR (2017)	Volkswagen EA888 2.0 L I4	135	(Netherlands) Rogier van der Linde	TX	2
(Netherlands) JW Raceservice	Audi RS 3 LMS TCR (2017)	Volkswagen EA888 2.0 L I4	135	(Netherlands) Pieter van Noordenne	TX	2
(Netherlands) CP Motorsport	Cupra León TCR	Volkswagen EA888 2.0 L I4	142	(Netherlands) Robbin Heijerman	TX	5
(Netherlands) CP Motorsport	Cupra León TCR	Volkswagen EA888 2.0 L I4	142	(Netherlands) Karel Neleman	TX	5
(Netherlands) CP Motorsport	Cupra León TCR	Volkswagen EA888 2.0 L I4	142	(Netherlands) Matthijs Terlouw	TX	5
(Netherlands) CP Motorsport	Cupra León TCR	Volkswagen EA888 2.0 L I4	142	(Netherlands) Peter Terlouw	TX	5
(United Kingdom) CWS Engineering	Ginetta G56	Ginetta LS3 6.2 L V8	178	(United Kingdom) Colin White	TX	2
(United Kingdom) CWS Engineering	Ginetta G56	Ginetta LS3 6.2 L V8	178	(Australia) Neale Muston	TX	2

Icon	Class
TC	TC
TX	TCX

== Race results ==
Bold indicates overall winner.

Event	Circuit	GT3-Pro Winners	GT3-Pro/Am Winners	GT3-Am Winners	GTX Winners	992-Pro Winners	992-Am Winners	GT4 Winners	TCE Winners	Report
1	(Italy) Mugello	No entries	**(France) No. 18 Saintéloc Junior Team**	(Slovakia) No. 44 ARC Bratislava	(France) No. 701 Vortex V8	(Belgium) No. 921 Mühlner Motorsport	(Qatar) No. 974 QMMF by HRT Performance	No entries	(Germany) No. 102 asBest Racing	Report
1	(Italy) Mugello	No entries	**(Germany) Elia Erhart** **(Switzerland) Ernst Inderbitzin** **(Germany) Pierre Kaffer** **(France) Stephane Tribaudini**	(Slovakia) Adam Konôpka (Slovakia) Miro Konôpka (Slovakia) Zdeno Mikulasko (Austria) Gerhard Tweraser	(France) Philippe Bonnel (France) Arnoud Gomez (France) Olivier Gomez	(Denmark) Conrad Tox Leveau (Netherlands) Paul Meijer (Estonia) Martin Rump	(Qatar) Ahmed Al-Emadi (Qatar) Abdulla Ali Al-Khelaifi (Qatar) Faesal Al Yafei	No entries	(Switzerland) Thomas Alpiger (Poland) Rafal Gieras (Germany) Pia Ohlsson	Report
2	(Belgium) Spa	**(United Kingdom) No. 77 Optimum Motorsport**	(Germany) No. 73 Proton Competition	(Antigua and Barbuda) No. 2 HAAS RT	(France) No. 701 Vortex V8	(Belgium) No. 921 Mühlner Motorsport	(Qatar) No. 974 QMMF by HRT Performance	No entries	(Italy) No. 114 Not Only Motorsport	Report
2	(Belgium) Spa	**(Germany) Salman Owega** **(United Kingdom) Morgan Tillbrook** **(United Kingdom) Freddie Tomlinson**	(Germany) Jörg Dreisow (Germany) Constantin Dressler (Germany) Manuel Lauck (Netherlands) Robert de Haan	(Belgium) Simon Balcaen (Belgium) Mathieu Castelein (Belgium) Pierre Castelein (France) Steven Palette	(France) Philippe Bonnel (France) Alexandre De Bernardinis (France) Julien Boillot	(Denmark) Conrad Tox Leveau (Estonia) Martin Rump (Germany) Julian Hanses (Germany) Tim Scheerbarth	(Qatar) Ahmed Al-Emadi (Qatar) Abdulla Ali Al-Khelaifi (Qatar) Faesal Al Yafei	No entries	(Italy) Gino Rocchio (Italy) Filippo Tornaghi	Report
3	(France) Paul Ricard	No entries	(Germany) No. 28 GetSpeed Team PCX Racing	**(Switzerland) No. 11 Hofor Racing**	(France) No. 701 Vortex V8	(Netherlands) No. 909 Red Camel-Jordans.nl	(Germany) No. 928 HRT Performance	(France) No. 44 Circuit Toys	(Germany) No. 102 asBest Racing	Report
3	(France) Paul Ricard	No entries	(France) Jordan Boisson (France) Patrick Charlaix (Germany) Maro Engel (Belgium) Benjamin Paque	**(Germany) Torsten Kratz** **(Switzerland) Michael Kroll** **(Germany) Maximilian Partl** **(Germany) Alexander Prinz**	(France) Philippe Bonnel (France) Alexandre De Bernardinis (France) Julien Boillot	(Netherlands) Ivo Breukers (Netherlands) Luc Breukers (Netherlands) Rik Breukers (Switzerland) Fabian Denz	(United Kingdom) Steven Gambrell (Republic of Ireland) Jonathan Kearney (United Kingdom) James Kellett (Portugal) Igor Sorokin	(Netherlands) Norbert Dekker (France) Olivier Huez (France) Hugo Poppe (Netherlands) Johan de Rouw	(Poland) Rafal Gieras (Germany) Pia Ohlsson (Belgium) Steven Teirlinck	Report
4	(Germany) Nürburgring	(Germany) No. 88 Up2Race	(Germany) No. 73 Proton Competition	**(Germany) No. 286 GetSpeed Team JR286**	(Denmark) No. 743 KEO Racing	(Netherlands) No. 909 Red Camel-Jordans.nl	(Germany) No. 928 HRT Performance	(Switzerland) No. 431 Hofor Racing by Bonk Motorsport	(Italy) No. 114 Not Only Motorsport	Report
4	(Germany) Nürburgring	(Germany) Fabio Grosse (Germany) Tim Heinemann (Ukraine) Oleksiy Kikireshko	(Germany) Jörg Dreisow (Germany) Constantin Dressler (Germany) Manuel Lauck (Germany) Joel Sturm	**(United States) Tanner Harvey** **(United States) Jon Hirshberg** **(Luxembourg) Steve Jans** **(United States) Patrick Liddy**	(United Kingdom) Adrian Kunzle (United States) Kevin Madsen	(Netherlands) Ivo Breukers (Netherlands) Luc Breukers (Netherlands) Rik Breukers (Switzerland) Fabian Denz	(United Kingdom) Steven Gambrell (Republic of Ireland) Jonathan Kearney (United Kingdom) James Kellett (Portugal) Igor Sorokin	(Germany) Michael Bonk (Germany) Claudia Hürtgen (Switzerland) Martin Kroll (Germany) Elia Weiss	(France) Nathan Huet (Italy) Gino Rocchio (Italy) Filippo Tornaghi	Report
5	(Spain) Barcelona	**(Germany) No. 88 Up2Race**	(France) No. 18 Saintéloc Junior Team	(Antigua and Barbuda) No. 21 HAAS RT	(France) No. 701 Vortex V8	(Netherlands) No. 925 Van Berlo Motorsport by CP Motorsport	(France) No. 888 SebLajoux Racing	(Netherlands) No. 483 CP Motorsport	(Netherlands) No. 142 CP Motorsport	Report
5	(Spain) Barcelona	**(Germany) Fabio Grosse** **(Germany) Tim Heinemann** **(Ukraine) Oleksiy Kikireshko** **(Germany) Alfred Renauer**	(Austria) Michael Doppelmayr (Germany) Elia Erhart (Germany) Pierre Kaffer (France) Célia Martin (France) Stephane Tribaudini	(Spain) Manel Lao Cornargo (Norway) Storm Gjerdrum (Belgium) Nicolas Guelinckx (Belgium) Peter Guelinckx	(France) Julien Boillot (France) Philippe Bonnel (France) Thierry Chkondali (France) Marc Girard (Canada) Michel Sallenbach	(Netherlands) Glenn van Berlo (Netherlands) Kay van Berlo (Netherlands) Marcel van Berlo (Netherlands) Bart van Helden	(Netherlands) Wouter Boerekamps (France) Sebastien Lajoux (France) Stéphane Perrin (Netherlands) Ralph Poppelaars (United Kingdom) Anthony Vince	(Netherlands) Patrick Grootscholten (Netherlands) Semo Keric (Belgium) Pieter-Jan Lefevere (Netherlands) Johan de Rouw (Netherlands) Daaf Steentjes	(Netherlands) Robbin Heijerman (Netherlands) Karel Neleman (Netherlands) Matthijs Terlouw (Netherlands) Peter Terlouw	Report

== Championship standings ==
=== Points system ===
Championship points are awarded in each class at the finish of each event. Points are awarded based on finishing positions in qualifying and the race as shown in the chart below. Drivers and teams who compete in all races have the lowest finish dropped from the final points standings.

==== Point allocation for races of 24 hours ====
Position	**1st**	**2nd**	**3rd**	**4th**	**5th**	**6th**	**7th**	**8th**	**9th**	**10th**	**11th**	**12th**	**13th**	**14th**	**15th**
Points	40	36	32	28	24	20	18	16	14	12	10	8	6	4	2
Points	20	18	16	14	12	10	9	8	7	6	5	4	3	2	1

==== Point allocation for races from 10 to 24 hours ====
Position	**1st**	**2nd**	**3rd**	**4th**	**5th**	**6th**	**7th**	**8th**	**9th**	**10th**	**11th**	**12th**	**13th**	**14th**	**15th**
Points	40	36	32	28	24	20	18	16	14	12	10	8	6	4	2

=== GT3 Drivers' Championship ===
Pos.	Drivers	Team	(Italy) MUG	(Belgium) SPA	(France) LEC	(Germany) NÜR	(Spain) BAR		Pts.
Pos.	Drivers	Team	(Italy) MUG	(Belgium) SPA	(France) LEC	(Germany) NÜR	12H	24H	Pts.
1	(Germany) Elia Erhart (Germany) Pierre Kaffer (France) Stephane Tribaudini	(France) Saintéloc Junior Team	1		3	6	4	4	134
2	(Germany) Torsten Kratz (Switzerland) Michael Kroll (Germany) Alexander Prinz	(Switzerland) Hofor Racing	6	~~10~~	1	8	5	3	120
3	(United States) Patrick Liddy	(Germany) GetSpeed Team JR286	~~11~~	3	6	1	12	11	106
3	(United States) Tanner Harvey (Luxembourg) Steve Jans	(Germany) GetSpeed Team JR286		3	6	1	12	11	106
4	(Germany) Maximilian Partl	(Switzerland) Hofor Racing	6		1		5	3	104
5	(Malaysia) Dominic Ang (Malaysia) Douglas Khoo	(Malaysia) Viper Niza Racing	8	8	~~10~~	3	2	6	102
6	(France) Jordan Boisson (France) Patrick Charlaix (Belgium) Benjamin Paque	(Germany) GetSpeed Team PCX Racing	**5**	7	**2**	~~**12**~~	11	**7**	101
7	(Germany) Alfred Renauer	(Germany) Herberth Motorsport	2	14					100
7	(Germany) Alfred Renauer	(Germany) Up2Race					1	1	100
7	(Belgium) Kobe de Breucker (India) Ajith Kumar (Belgium) Ayrton Redant (Belgium) Yannick Redant	(India) Ajith RedAnt Racing	7	5	5	~~13~~	6	5	100
8	(Malaysia) Melvin Moh	(Malaysia) Viper Niza Racing	8		10	3	2	6	98
9	(Germany) Fabio Grosse (Germany) Tim Heinemann (Ukraine) Oleksiy Kikireshko	(Germany) Up2Race				2	1	1	96
10	(Austria) Michael Doppelmayr	(France) Saintéloc Junior Team			3	6	4	4	94
11	(Switzerland) Chantal Prinz	(Switzerland) Hofor Racing	6	10		8	5	3	94
12	(Belgium) Peter Guelinckx	(Antigua and Barbuda) HAAS RT	9	6	15	~~Ret~~	3	2	88
13	(Belgium) Nicolas Guelinckx	(Antigua and Barbuda) HAAS RT	9	6		Ret	3	2	86
14	(Germany) Jörg Dreisow (Germany) Constantin Dressler (Germany) Manuel Lauck	(Germany) Proton Competition	13	4	7	4			80
15	(Germany) Adam Osieka	(Germany) GetSpeed Team JR286	11	3	6		12	11	76
16	(Germany) Paul Scheuschner (Cyprus) Vasily Vladykin	(United Kingdom) Continental Racing by Simpson Motorsport	4	15†	9	5	~~Ret~~	~~Ret~~	68
16	(Germany) Alex Aka	(United Kingdom) Continental Racing by Simpson Motorsport	4	15†	9	5			68
17	(United States) Jon Hirshberg	(Germany) GetSpeed Team JR286	11			1	12	11	64
18	(Spain) Pablo Burguera (Spain) Oliver Campos (Spain) Antonio Sainero	(Spain) E2P Racing	10	~~12~~	8	9	10	9	62
19	(Switzerland) Ernst Inderbitzin	(France) Saintéloc Junior Team	1			6			60
19	(Germany) Maro Engel	(Germany) GetSpeed Team PCX Racing	**5**		**2**				60
20	(Australia) Andres Latorre	(Germany) GetSpeed Team JR286	11						55
20	(Australia) Andres Latorre	(Italy) Pellin Racing		9					55
20	(Australia) Andres Latorre	(Lithuania) Juta Racing			~~13~~	10	9	10	55
21	(Malaysia) Aaron Lim Say Joon	(Malaysia) Viper Niza Racing					2	6	54
22	(Spain) Manel Lao Cornargo (Norway) Storm Gjerdrum	(Antigua and Barbuda) HAAS RT					3	2	52
23	(United Kingdom) Oliver Bryant (United States) Ryan Dalziel (United Kingdom) Jake Hill (United States) Dwight Merriman	(United States) Era Motorsport	15†	~~Ret~~	4	14	7	12†	51
24	(Germany) Joel Sturm	(Germany) Proton Competition			7	4			46
25	(Belgium) Simon Balcaen (France) Steven Palette	(Antigua and Barbuda) HAAS RT		2	12				44
26	(Slovakia) Adam Konôpka (Slovakia) Miro Konôpka	(Slovakia) ARC Bratislava	3	Ret		11			42
26	(Slovakia) Zdeno Mikulasko	(Slovakia) ARC Bratislava	3			11			42
26	(France) Célia Martin	(France) Saintéloc Junior Team					4	4	42
26	(Canada) Mikaël Grenier	(Germany) GetSpeed Team PCX Racing				**12**			42
26	(Canada) Mikaël Grenier	(India) Ajith RedAnt Racing					6	5	42
27	(Germany) Salman Owega (United Kingdom) Morgan Tillbrook (United Kingdom) Freddie Tomlinson	(United Kingdom) Optimum Motorsport		**1**					40
28	(Belgium) Mathieu Castelein (Belgium) Pierre Castelein	(Antigua and Barbuda) HAAS RT		2	15				38
28	(Paraguay) Miguel María García	(United Kingdom) Continental Racing by Simpson Motorsport			9	5	Ret	Ret	38
29	(Germany) Ralf Bohn (Switzerland) Rolf Ineichen	(Germany) Herberth Motorsport	2						36
30	(Austria) Gerhard Tweraser	(Slovakia) ARC Bratislava	3	Ret					32
30	(United States) Lisa Clark (Canada) Kyle Marcelli (United States) Jeff Westphal	(Italy) Pellin Racing		9		7			32
31	(Germany) Florian Scholze	(United Kingdom) Continental Racing by Simpson Motorsport	4						28
31	(Netherlands) Robert de Haan	(Germany) Proton Competition		4					28
32	(Germany) Felipe Fernández Laser (Germany) David Jahn (Germany) Moritz Kranz (Finland) Jesse Krohn (Slovakia) Antal Zsigó	(Slovakia) Gamota Racing					8	8	24
33	(France) César Gazeau (Belgium) Maxime Martin	(Germany) GetSpeed Team PCX Racing					11	**7**	23
34	(Portugal) Henrique Chaves	(Spain) E2P Racing					10	9	20
35	(China) Liang Jiatong (United Kingdom) Gavin Pickering (China) Zhang Yaqi (China) Eric Z.	(Lithuania) Juta Racing					9	10	19
36	(Italy) Corinna Gostner (Italy) David Gostner (Italy) Manuela Gostner (Italy) Thomas Gostner	(Italy) MP Racing	14	11	14				18
36	(France) Marvin Klein	(Germany) GetSpeed Team PCX Racing		7					18
36	(United States) Massimo Perrina	(Italy) Pellin Racing				7			18
37	(Germany) Max Moritz	(Germany) Herberth Motorsport	12	14					12
37	(Lithuania) Leonardas Dirzys (Germany) Lutz Obermann	(Lithuania) Juta Racing				10			12
38	(Slovakia) Matej Konôpka	(Slovakia) ARC Bratislava		Ret		11			10
38	(Lithuania) Arunas Geciauskas (Italy) Nicola Michelon (Greece) Zois Skrimpias	(Lithuania) Juta Racing			11				10
39	(Germany) Vincent Kolb (Germany) Robert Renauer	(Germany) Herberth Motorsport	12						8
40	(Germany) Dennis Marschall	(Germany) Herberth Motorsport	13						6
40	(Belgium) Nicolas Baert (Belgium) Xavier Knauf (Belgium) Gregory Servais	(Belgium) Comtoyou Racing		13					6
40	(Lithuania) Domas Raudonis (Italy) Marc Sharinn (Greece) Tyler Sharinn	(Lithuania) Juta Racing			13				6
41	(Austria) Klaus Bachler	(Germany) Herberth Motorsport		14					4
42	(India) Akhil Agarwal	(United Kingdom) Continental Racing by Simpson Motorsport		15†					2
*	(Netherlands) Tom Coronel (Netherlands) Jan Jaap van Roon	(Belgium) Comtoyou Racing		Ret					—
44	(United Kingdom) Hugo Cook	(United Kingdom) Continental Racing by Simpson Motorsport					Ret	Ret	0

Colour	Result
Gold	Winner
Silver	Second place
Bronze	Third place
Green	Points classification
Blue	Non-points classification
Blue	Non-classified finish (NC)
Purple	Retired, not classified (Ret)
Red	Did not qualify (DNQ)
Red	Did not pre-qualify (DNPQ)
Black	Disqualified (DSQ)
White	Did not start (DNS)
White	Withdrew (WD)
White	Race cancelled (C)
Blank	Did not practice (DNP)
Blank	Did not arrive (DNA)
Blank	Excluded (EX)

**Bold** – Pole
Italics – Fastest Lap

† – Drivers did not finish the race, but were classified as they completed over 60% of the class winner's race distance.
