= 2010 12 Hours of Hungary =

Hungarian car race

Track map of the Hungaroring.

The 2010 12 Hours of Hungary was an endurance sports car race held on October 9, 2010, at the Hungaroring. The race was organized by Creventic and open to GT, touring cars and 24H-Specials, like silhouette cars. This was the second and final race of the 2010 24H Series and also the third running of the event.

== Official Results ==
Class winners are marked in bold.

Pos	Class	No.	Team	Drivers	Chassis	Laps	Time/Reason
1	**A6**	**2**	**(Austria) Lechner Racing**	**(Austria) Nikolaus Mayr-Melnhof** **(Austria) Walter Lechner** **(Austria) Thomas Gruber** **(Austria) Philip König**	**Audi R8 LMS**	**355**	**12:01:33.646**
2	A6	1	(Hungary) Bovi Motorsport 1	(Hungary) Kálmán Bodis (Hungary) István Rácz (Germany) Wolfgang Kaufmann (United States) Tom Nastasi	Brokernet Silver Sting	348	+7 Laps
3	A6	6	(Finland) Westend Racing	(Finland) Valle Mäkelä (Sweden) Erik Behrens (Finland) Jorma Vanhanen	Porsche 911 GT3 Cup S	346	+9 Laps
4	A6	12	(Slovakia) ARC Bratislava	(Slovakia) Miro Konôpka (Italy) Stefano Crotti (Italy) Mauro Casadei	Porsche 997 Cup	338	+17 Laps
5	**D2**	**3**	**BMW Team Hungary**	**(Hungary) László Csuti** **(Hungary) Tamás Kovács** **(Hungary) Janos Vida** **(Hungary) Gábor Wéber**	**BMW 120D**	**325**	**+30 Laps**
6	**A3T**	**26**	**(Spain) Monlau Competicion 2**	**(Portugal) Francisco Carvalho** **(Spain) David Cebrián Ariza** **(Spain) Pepe Oriola**	**Seat Leon Super Copa**	**325**	**+30 Laps**
7	**SP2**	**88**	**(Netherlands) Red Camel Racing 1**	**(Netherlands) Ivo Breukers** **(Netherlands) Bas Koeten** **(Netherlands) Wolf Nathan**	**Audi R8**	**321**	**+34 Laps**
8	A3T	57	(Netherlands) Team Jordans.nl	(Netherlands) Monny Krant (Netherlands) Henk Thijssen (Netherlands) Ton Verkoelen	Saker Sportscar GT TDI	320	+35 Laps
9	A3T	30	(United Kingdom) Povey Motorsport	(United Kingdom) Graham Coombes (United Kingdom) Geoff Kimber-Smith (United Kingdom) Guy Povey	BMW M3 E46	314	+41 Laps
10	SP2	61	(Germany) Gmaxx Racing	(Germany) Arno Klasen (Andorra) Ed Nicelife (Poland) Boleslav Waszek	Chevrolet Corvette	312	+43 Laps
11	D2	47	(Lithuania) VSI Kauno Sporto Klubas 'RIMO'	(Lithuania) Rimantas Blazulionis (Lithuania) Vaidas Navickas (Lithuania) Saulius Vitkauskas	BMW 335 D	311	+44 Laps
12	A3T	28	(Germany) KONRAD-Motorsport	(Liechtenstein) Patrick Hilty (Switzerland) Paul Hunsperger (Liechtenstein) Johann Wanger	Volkswagen Golf V Gti	311	+44 Laps
13	SP2	58	(Belgium) VDS Racing Adventure	(Belgium) José Close (Belgium) Raphaël van der Straten	Ford Mustang	308	+47 Laps
14	**A2**	**41**	**(Denmark) Team Sally Racing**	**(Denmark) Martin Sally Pedersen** **(Slovakia) Miroslav Hornak** **(Denmark) Peter Obel** **(Denmark) Andreas Schoder**	**Renault Clio 3**	**307**	**+48 Laps**
15	A3T	29	(Hungary) Alerant Endurance Team	(Hungary) Egon Burkus (Hungary) Gábor Tim (Hungary) Àron Töszsér	Lotus Exige 260 Cup	296	+59 Laps
16	A2	36	(Spain) Monlau Competicion 1	(Spain) Pepus Alonso Prieto (Spain) Jamie Manuel Hernández Rosado (Spain) Javier Hernández Rosado	Renault Clio Cup	293	+62 Laps
17	D2	46	(Switzerland) TTC-Racing	(Switzerland) Andreas Kempf (Germany) Dirk Müller (Switzerland) Daniel Schilliger	Volkswagen Golf 4	276	+79 Laps
18	A2	37	Endurance Club Hungary	(Hungary) Ferenc Ficza (Hungary) István Gáspár (Hungary) Gusztáv Herter (Hungary) Benedek Major	Ford Fiesta	262	+93 Laps
19	A6	7	(Sweden) WestCoast Racing	(Sweden) Richard Göransson (Sweden) Stanley Dickens (Sweden) Lars Stugemo (Sweden) Magnus Öhman	BMW Z4 GT3	254	+101 Laps
20	A2	35	(Denmark) Stefan Kaas Racing Team	(Denmark) Jackie Bellingtoft (Denmark) Niels Borum (Denmark) Christian Daluiso (Denmark) Jacques D. Møller	BMW Mini Challenge	230	+125 Laps
21 DNF	A6	55	(United Kingdom) JWA Racing	(United Kingdom) Rob Bell (Netherlands) Tom Coronel (United Kingdom) Paul Daniels	Porsche 911 GT3 RSR (997)	88	Clutch
22 DNF	A6	4	(Netherlands) Lammertink Racing with Toyo Tires	(Japan) Yasushi Kikuchi (Japan) Takayuki Kinoshita (Hong Kong) Darryl O'Young	Porsche 997 GT3 CUP	65	Fire
23 DNF	A3T	32	(United Kingdom) Intersport Racing	(United Kingdom) Kevin Clarke (United Kingdom) Wayne Gibson	BMW E46 M3	36	Engine

== Statistics ==
- Fastest Lap - #7 Westcoast Racing - 1:50.325
- Distance - 1,555.255 km (966.31 mi)
