= 2008 12 Hours of Hungary =

Track map of the Hungaroring.

The 2008 12 Hours of Hungary was an endurance sports car race held on September 27, 2008, at the Hungaroring. The race was organized by Creventic and open to GT, touring cars and 24H-Specials, like silhouette cars. This was the second and final event of the 2008 24H Series. This was the first running of the event.

== Official Results ==
Class winners are marked in bold.

Pos	Class	No.	Team	Drivers	Chassis	Laps
1	**A6**	**52**	**(Germany) Schubert Motorsport**	**(Germany) Claudia Hürtgen** **(Norway) Stian Sørlie** **(Germany) Jörg Viebahn**	**BMW Z4 M Coupe**	**349**
2	A6	58	(Sweden) Levin Racing	(Sweden) Anders Levin (Sweden) Erik Behrens (Sweden) Magnus Öhman (Sweden) Lars Stugemo	Porsche 996 GT3RS	340
3	A6	14	(Austria) Jetalliance	(Austria) Lukas Lichtner-Hoyer (Austria) Vitus Eckert (United Kingdom) Ryan Sharp	Porsche 996 GT3 RSR	331
4	**D1**	**99**	**(Germany) Schubert Motorsport**	**(Hungary) Csaba Walter** **(Denmark) Jacob Tackman-Thomson** **(Denmark) Jan Kalmar** **(Germany) Peter Posavac**	**BMW 120d**	**318**
5	D1	88	(Hungary) Procar Motorsport	(Hungary) László Csuti (Hungary) Brigitta Nagy (Hungary) Viktor Csuti (Hungary) Norbert Kiss (Hungary) Tibor Nagy	Seat Leon Supercopa	309
6	D1	93	(Netherlands) Marcos Racing International	(Hungary) Bela Czenkar (Netherlands) Cor Euser (Hungary) István Balásdi-Szabó (Hungary) Zoltan Molnar	BMW 120d	308
7	**SP2**	**103**	**(Hungary) Bovi Motorsport**	**(Hungary) Attila Barta** **(Hungary) Kalman Bodis** **(Hungary) Istvan Racz**	**Brokernet Silver Sting**	**304**
8	D1	94	(Netherlands) Marcos Racing International	(El Salvador) Toto Lassally (United States) Jim Briody (Spain) José Luis Bermúdez de Castro (Netherlands) Cor Euser	BMW 120d	299
9	SP2	35	(Hungary) Proex Sport	(Hungary) Zsolt Horvath (Hungary) Robert Szabolcs	Ferrari 430 Challenge	275
10	**A2**	**76**	**Endurance Club Hungary**	**(Hungary) István Gáspár** **(Hungary) Gustáv Herter** **(Hungary) Béla Nyritay** **(Hungary) Lászlo Fekete**	**Ford Fiesta GT**	**274**
11	A2	70	(Hungary) Bovi Motorsport	(Hungary) Sándor Zental (Hungary) Lászlo Keskeny (Hungary) Gábor Grigalek	Suzuki Swift	263
12	SP2	116	(Belgium) VDS Racing Adventures	(Belgium) Christian Deridder (Belgium) Raphaël van der Straten	Ford Mustang	259
13	D1	86	(Netherlands) Didi Motorsport	(Netherlands) Henk Thijssen (Netherlands) Ton Verkoelen	Seat Leon	116
14 DNF	D1	85	(Netherlands) Didi Motorsport	(Netherlands) Ivo Breukers (Germany) Edgar Schönleben (Germany) Wolfram Lethert	Seat Ibiza Cupra	117
15	SP2	888	(Netherlands) Audi CR-8 Team	(Netherlands) Ivo Breukers (Netherlands) Cor Euser (Netherlands) Jaap van Lagen	Audi R8	46
16	A2	22	(Hungary) Absolute Motorsport	(Hungary) Károly Burghardt (Hungary) Zsolt Csüllog	Honda Civic	18
17 DNF	A6	5	(Slovakia) ARC Bratislava	(Slovakia) Miro Konôpka (Slovakia) Miroslav Hornak (Slovakia) Andřej Studenič	Porsche 996 GT3RS	16

== Statistics ==
- Distance - 1,528.969 km (950.057 mi)
