= 2026 12 Hours of Mugello =

The layout of Mugello Circuit, were the race was held

The 2026 12 Hours of Mugello (known as the 2026 Michelin 12 Hours of Mugello for sponsorship reasons) was an endurance sportscar races held on the 21 and 22 March 2026, in Tuscany, Italy, as the first of five rounds of the 2026 24H Series. It was the twelfth running of the event, and the eleventh running of the event as part of the 24H Series.

== Background ==
The event was announced on 7 October 2025, along with the rest of the 2026 24H Series calendar.

== Entry list ==
The entry list was announced on 14 March 2026 and features 30 entries over 4 classes – 15 in GT3, 2 in GTX, 9 in 992, and 2 in TCE.

No.	Entrant	Car	Class	Driver 1	Driver 2	Driver 3	Driver 4	Driver 5
GT3 (15 entries)
11	(Switzerland) Hofor Racing	Mercedes-AMG GT3 Evo	Am	(Germany) Torsten Kratz	(Switzerland) Michael Kroll	(Germany) Maximilian Partl	(Germany) Alexander Prinz	(Switzerland) Chantal Prinz
18	(France) Saintéloc Junior Team	Audi R8 LMS GT3 Evo II	PA	(Austria) Michael Doppelmayr	(Germany) Elia Erhart	(Switzerland) Ernst Inderbitzin	(Germany) Pierre Kaffer	(France) Stephane Tribaudini
21	(Antigua and Barbuda) HAAS RT	Audi R8 LMS GT3 Evo II	Am	(Belgium) Nicolas Guelinckx	(Belgium) Peter Guelinckx			
28	(Germany) GetSpeed Team PCX Racing	Mercedes-AMG GT3 Evo	PA	(France) Jordan Boisson	(France) Patrick Charlaix	(Germany) Maro Engel	(Belgium) Benjamin Paque	
44	(Slovakia) ARC Bratislava	Lamborghini Huracán GT3 Evo	Am	(Slovakia) Adam Konôpka	(Slovakia) Matej Konopka	(Slovakia) Miro Konôpka		
58	(Italy) MP Racing	Mercedes-AMG GT3 Evo	Am	(Italy) Corinna Gostner	(Italy) David Gostner	(Italy) Manuela Gostner	(Italy) Thomas Gostner	
65	(Malaysia) Viper Niza Racing	Mercedes-AMG GT3 Evo	Am	(Malaysia) Dominic Ang	(Malaysia) Douglas Khoo	(Malaysia) Melvin Moh		
69	(United Kingdom) Continental Racing by Simpson Motorsport	Audi R8 LMS Evo II	Am	(Germany) Alex Aka	(Germany) Paul Scheuschner	(Germany) Florian Scholze	(Cyprus) Vasily Vladykin	
73	(Germany) Proton Competition	Porsche 911 GT3 R (992.2)	PA	(Germany) Jörg Dreisow	(Germany) Constantin Dressler	(Germany) Manuel Lauck	(Germany) Dennis Marschall	
81	(United States) Era Motorsport	Ferrari 296 GT3	PA	(United Kingdom) Oliver Bryant	(United States) Ryan Dalziel	(United Kingdom) Jake Hill	(United States) Dwight Merriman	
90	(Spain) E2P Racing	Aston Martin Vantage AMR GT3 Evo	Am	(Spain) Pablo Burguera	(Spain) Olievr Campos	(Spain) Antonio Sainero		
91	(Germany) Herberth Motorsport	Porsche 911 GT3 R (992.2)	PA	(Germany) Ralf Bohn	(Switzerland) Rolf Ineichen	(Germany) Alfred Renauer		
93	(India) Ajith RedAnt Racing	Mercedes-AMG GT3 Evo	PA	(Belgium) Kobe de Breucker	(India) Ajith Kumar	(Belgium) Ayrton Redant	(Belgium) Yannick Redant	
269	(Germany) Herberth Motorsport	Porsche 911 GT3 R (992.2)	PA	(Germany) Vincent Kolb	(Germany) Max Moritz	(Germany) Robert Renauer		
286	(Germany) GetSpeed Team JR286	Mercedes-AMG GT3 Evo	Am	(United States) Jon Hirshberg	(Australia) Andres Latorre	(United States) Patrick Liddy	(Germany) Adam Osieka	
GTX (2 entries)								
701	(France) Vortex V8	Vortex 2.0		(France) Philippe Bonnel	(France) Arnoud Gomez	(France) Olivier Gomez		
767	(Italy) Dinamic Motorsport	Maserati MC20 GT2		(Switzerland) Mauro Calamia	(Italy) Amedeo Pampanini	(Italy) Roberto Pampanini		
992 (9 entries)								
888	(France) SebLajoux Racing	Porsche 992 GT3 Cup (992.1)	Am	(France) Sebastien Lajoux	(France) Stéphane Perrin	(France) Louis Perrot	(United Kingdom) Anthony Vince	
907	(Germany) RPM Racing	Porsche 992 GT3 Cup (992.1)	Am	(Germany) Philip Hamprecht	(Sweden) Niclas Jönsson	(United States) Tracy Krohn		
909	(Netherlands) Red Camel-Jordans.nl	Porsche 992 GT3 Cup (992.1)	P	(Netherlands) Ivo Breukers	(Netherlands) Luc Breukers	(Netherlands) Rik Breukers	(Switzerland) Fabian Denz	
910	(France) SebLajoux Racing	Porsche 992 GT3 Cup (992.1)	Am	(France) Lionel Amrouche	(United Kingdom) Rhys Lloyd	(Switzerland) Yannick Mettler		
911	(Italy) The Driving Experiences	Porsche 992 GT3 Cup (992.1)	Am	(Italy) Francesco Fenici	(Switzerland) Ivan Jacoma	(Switzerland) Valerio Presezzi		
920	(France) Chazel Technologie Course	Porsche 992 GT3 Cup (992.1)	Am	(France) Antoni de Barn	(France) Jean-Paul Dominici	(France) Jean-Mathieu Leandri		
921	(Belgium) Mühlner Motorsport	Porsche 992 GT3 Cup (992.1)	P	(Denmark) Conrad Tox Leveau	(Netherlands) Paul Meijer	(Estonia) Martin Rump		
928	(Germany) HRT Performance	Porsche 992 GT3 Cup (992.1)	Am	(United Kingdom) Steven Gambrell	(Republic of Ireland) Jonathan Kearney	(Portugal) Igor Sorokin		
974	(Qatar) QMMF by HRT Performance	Porsche 992 GT3 Cup (992.1)	Am	(Qatar) Ahmed Al-Emadi	(Qatar) Abdulla Ali Al-Khelaifi	(Qatar) Faesal Al Yafei		
TCE (2 entries)								
102	(Germany) asBest Racing	SEAT Leon Cup Racer	TX	(Switzerland) Thomas Alpiger	(Poland) Rafal Gieras	(Germany) Pia Ohlsson		
114	(Italy) Not Only Motorsport	Ligier JS2 R	TX	(Italy) Alberto Antonucci	(Italy) Gino Rocchio	(Italy) Filippo Tornaghi		

GT3 entries
Icon	Class
P	GT3-Pro
PA	GT3-Pro/Am
Am	GT3-Am
992 entries
Icon	Class
P	992-Pro
Am	992-Am
TCE entries
Icon	Class
TC	TC
TX	TCX

== Schedule ==
Date	Time (local: CET)	Event	Duration
Friday, 20 March	11:45- 13:45	Free practice	2 hours
Friday, 20 March	16:15 - 17:14	Qualifying - TCE, GT4, GTX & 992	3x15 minutes
Friday, 20 March	17:25 - 18:20	Qualifying - GT3	3x15 minutes
Saturday, 21 March	12:10 - 17:40	Race - Part 1	5.5 hours
Sunday, 22 March	12:00 - 18:30	Race - Part 2	6.5 hours

== Free Practice ==
Class	No.	Entrant	Driver	Time
GT3	28	(Germany) GetSpeed Team PCX Racing	(Germany) Maro Engel	1:46.757
GTX	701	(France) Vortex V8	(France) Olivier Gomez	1:49.380
992	888	(France) SebLajoux Racing	(France) Louis Perrot	1:51.155
TCE	114	(Italy) Not Only Motorsport	(Italy) Alberto Antonucci	2:04.063

- Note: Only the fastest car in each class is shown.

== Qualifying ==
Qualifying was split into three parts for all groups. The average of the best times per qualifying session determined the starting order.

=== Qualifying results ===
Pole position winners in each class are marked in bold.

== Race ==
=== Race results ===
==== Part 1 ====
Class winners are in bold.

==== Part 2 ====
Class winners are in bold.

==== Fastest lap ====
24H Series
Previous race: None	2026 season	Next race: 12 Hours of Spa-Francorchamps
