= 12 Hours of Hungary =

Sports car endurance race held in Hungary

24H Series
- Venue: Hungaroring
- First race: 2008
- Last race: 2021
- Duration: 12 Hours
- Most wins (driver): (Germany) Claudia Hürtgen (2) (Norway) Stian Sørlie (2) (Germany) Jörg Viebahn (2)
- Most wins (team): Schubert Motorsport (2)
- Most wins (manufacturer): BMW (2)

The 12 Hours of Hungary was both a sports car and touring car automobile endurance race held at the Hungaroring. In 2008, Dutch organizer Creventic, who also organizes the Dubai 24 Hour, added this event to their schedule of races.

== History ==
The race was run a total of seven times, 6 between 2008 and 2014 when the 24H Series did not award points or championships. The other occasion was when the event was revived in 2021 replacing the round at Autodromo di Pergusa.

== Race Winners ==
Year	Drivers	Team	Car	Remarks
2021	(Switzerland) Daniel Allemann (Germany) Ralf Bohn (Germany) Alfred Renauer	(Germany) Herberth Motorsport	Porsche 911 GT3 R (2019)	367 Laps. New distance record.
2015–2020	Not held			
2014	(Germany) Lance David Arnold (Germany) Tim Müller (Germany) Valentin Pierburg	(Germany) SPS automotive-performance	Mercedes SLS AMG GT3	345 Laps.
2013	(Switzerland) Marc A. Hayek (Netherlands) Peter Kox (Netherlands) Nico Pronk	(Switzerland) Blancpain Racing	Lamborghini Gallardo GT3	344 Laps.
2012	Not held			
2011	(Belgium) Benjamin Bailly (Belgium) Julien Schroyen (Belgium) Raphaël van der Straten	(Belgium) VDS Racing Adventures	Ford Mustang	332 Laps.
2010	(Austria) Thomas Gruber (Austria) Walter Lechner (Austria) Philip König (Austria) Nikolaus Mayr-Melnhof	(Austria) Lechner Racing	Audi R8 LMS	355 Laps.
2009	(Germany) Claudia Hürtgen (Norway) Stian Sørlie (Germany) Jörg Viebahn	(Germany) Schubert Motorsport	BMW Z4 M Coupe	350 Laps.
2008	(Germany) Claudia Hürtgen (Norway) Stian Sørlie (Germany) Jörg Viebahn	(Germany) Schubert Motorsport	BMW Z4 M Coupe	349 Laps. First running of the event.
