= 12 Hours of Mugello =

Sports car endurance race in Portugal

(Italy) 12 Hours of Mugello

24H Series
- Venue: Mugello Circuit
- First race: 2014
- First 24H GT race: 2015
- Duration: 12 hours
- Previous names: 12 Hours of Italy–Mugello (2014–2016)
- Most wins (driver): (Switzerland) Daniel Allemann (3) (Germany) Ralf Bohn (3) (Germany) Robert Renauer (3)
- Most wins (team): (Germany) Herberth Motorsport (3)
- Most wins (manufacturer): (Germany) Porsche (5)

The 12 Hours of Mugello (known as the Michelin 12 Hours of Mugello for sponsorship reasons) is an endurance motor race held annually in March at Mugello Circuit since 2014. The event is organized by Creventic as part of the 24H Series.

== History ==
The inaugural event took place on 14 and 15 March 2014, marking the first time Mugello Circuit hosted a 12-hour endurance event. The event has been held in March since its inception, with the exception of the 2018 edition, which was not held, and the 2020 edition, which was postponed until November due to the COVID-19 pandemic.

== Winners ==
Year	Overall winners	Entrant	Car	Time	Laps	Distance	Championship	Report
2014	(Portugal) Felipe Barreiros (Belarus) Alexander Talkanitsa Jr. (Belarus) Alexander Talkanitsa Sr. (Austria) Ilya Melnikov	(Italy) AF Corse	Ferrari 458 Italia GT2	12:01:51.530	349	1,830.51 km	Creventic 24H Series	Report
2015	(Switzerland) Daniel Allemann (Germany) Ralf Bohn (Germany) Robert Renauer (Germany) Alfred Renauer	(Germany) HB Racing Team Herberth	Porsche 997 GT3 R	12:00:32.537	342	1,793.79 km	24H Series	Report
2016	(Netherlands) Luc Braams (Netherlands) Max Braams (Netherlands) Nicky Pastorelli (Portugal) Miguel Ramos	(Netherlands) V8 Racing	Renault R.S. 01 FGT3	12:05:20.759	346	1,814.77 km	24H Series	Report
2017	(Czech Republic) Josef Král (Italy) Matteo Malucelli (Czech Republic) Jiří Písařík	(Czech Republic) Scuderia Praha	Ferrari 488 GT3	12:00:53.972	326	1,709.87 km	24H Series	Report
2018: Not held
2019	(Czech Republic) Josef Král (Italy) Matteo Malucelli (Czech Republic) Jiří Písařík	(Czech Republic) Bohemia Energy racing with Scuderia Praha	Ferrari 488 GT3	12:04:55.724	330	1,731.35 km	24H GT Series	Report
2020	(Switzerland) Daniel Allemann (Germany) Ralf Bohn (Germany) Robert Renauer	(Germany) Herberth Motorsport	Porsche 911 GT3 R (2019)	12:02.35.454	334	1,751.83 km	24H GT Series	Report
2021	(Switzerland) Daniel Allemann (Germany) Ralf Bohn (Germany) Robert Renauer (Germany) Alfred Renauer	(Germany) Herberth Motorsport	Porsche 911 GT3 R (2019)	12:02.38.786	335	1,757.08 km	24H GT Series	Report
2022	(Canada) Samantha Tan (United States) Bryson Morris (Canada) Nick Wittmer	(Canada) ST Racing	BMW M4 GT3	12:02.35.454	330	1,730.85 km	24H GT Series	Report
2023	(Belgium) Mathieu Detry (France) Stephane Perrin (Belgium) Frédéric Vervisch	(Antigua and Barbuda) HAAS RT	Audi R8 LMS Evo II	12:01:57:552	341	1,788.55 km	24H GT Series	Report
2024	(Netherlands) Lucas Groeneveld (Netherlands) Daan van Kuijk (Netherlands) Jan van Kuijk (Netherlands) Max van Splunteren	(Netherlands) GP Elite	Porsche 911 GT3 R (992)	12:05:41.200	327	1,715.12 km	24H Series	Report
2025	(Italy) Fabrizio Broggi (Italy) Sabino de Castro (Romania) Sergiu Nicolae	(Italy) Manamauri Energy by Ebimotors	Porsche 911 GT3 R (992)	12:02:45.349	305	1,599.73 km	24H Series	Report
2026	(Germany) Pierre Kaffer (Germany) Elia Erhart (Switzerland) Ernst Inderbitzin (France) Stephane Tribaudini	(France) Saintéloc Junior Team	Audi R8 LMS GT3 EVO II	12:01:48.490	350	TBA	24H Series	Report
