= 24H Series =

Sports car and touring car racing series

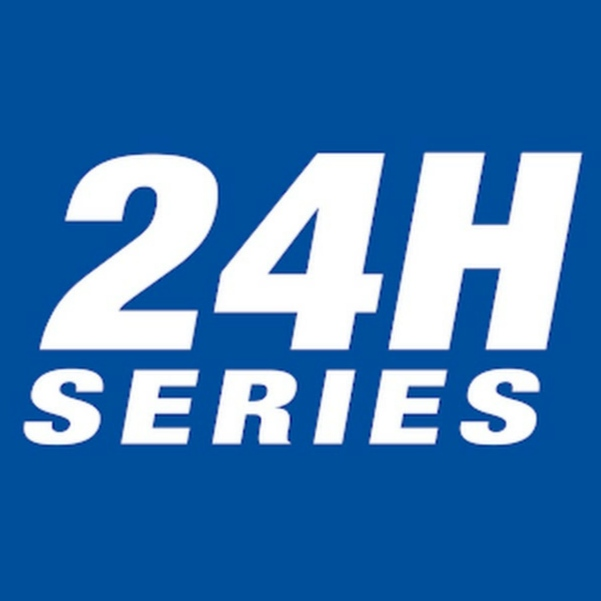
- Category: Grand tourer Touring cars Endurance racing
- Region: Europe
- Inaugural season: 2008 (Note: Although the series has been organising races since 2006, 2008 was the first season with more than one race and 2015 was the first season with drivers and teams battling for championship points and titles.)
- Tyre suppliers: Toyo (2006–2009); Dunlop (2010–2014); Hankook (2015–2024); Michelin (2025–present)
- Official website: www.24hseries.com

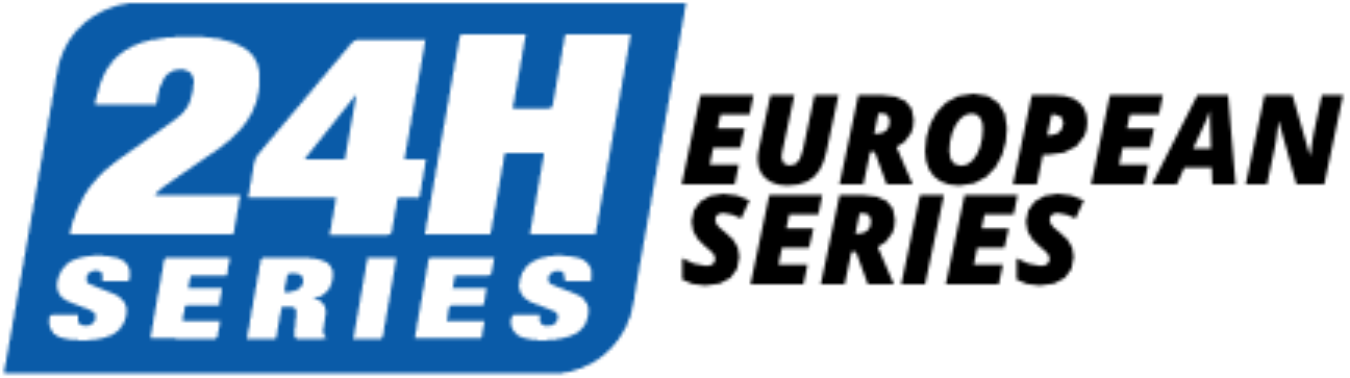
The Logo for the 24H Series European Series (since the Middle East Trophy has existed)

The 24H Series is a sports car racing and touring car racing series developed by Creventic and with approval from the Fédération Internationale de l'Automobile (FIA). It features GT3-spec cars, GT4-spec cars, sports cars, touring cars and 24H-Specials, like silhouette cars. The calendar consists only of 24-hour and 12-hour races. 2015 was the first season with drivers battling for championship points and titles. It also marked the first season with official FIA International Series’ status.

== Creventic ==
Dutch agency Creventic is the organiser and promoter of the series. Their goals are to organise races with "low costs, a convivial atmosphere with teams and drivers from all over the world and fair competition on the track." In co-operation with the Dutch National Racing Team (DNRT) – one of the biggest motorsport organisations of the Benelux – they organised the inaugural Dubai 24 Hour in 2006.

2008 was the first year Creventic organised another race besides the 24H Dubai: the 12H Hungary, making it the first season with more than one race and the official first season of the 24H Series. 2015 marked the first season with official FIA International Series’ status, which meant that drivers and teams would be eligible to battle for championship titles and points. Creventic is also the organiser of the 24H TCE Series.

== Circuits ==
Bold text marks circuits currently being used by the series

- (Portugal) Algarve International Circuit (2017–2020, 2022, 2024)
- (Italy) Autodromo di Pergusa (2020)
- (Czech Republic) Brno Circuit (2015–2016, 2019)
- (Spain) Circuit de Barcelona-Catalunya (2011–2016, 2018–2019, 2021–present)
- (Belgium) Circuit de Spa-Francorchamps (2018–2019, 2022–present)
- (United States) Circuit of the Americas (2017–2019)
- (France) Circuit Paul Ricard (2015–2017, 2021, 2025–present)
- (Netherlands) Circuit Zandvoort (2014–2016)
- (Spain) Circuito de Navarra (2018)
- (Portugal) Circuito do Estoril (2023)
- (United Arab Emirates) Dubai Autodrome (2006–2022)
- (Germany) Hockenheimring (2020–2022)
- (Hungary) Hungaroring (2008–2011, 2013–2014, 2021)
- (Italy) Imola Circuit (2017–2018)
- Kuwait Motor Town (2022)
- (Italy) Misano World Circuit (2024–2025)
- (Italy) Monza Circuit (2020, 2023)
- (Australia) Mount Panorama Circuit (2013)
- (Italy) Mugello Circuit (2014–2017, 2019–present)
- (Germany) Nürburgring (2026)
- (Austria) Red Bull Ring (2017)
- (United States) Sebring International Raceway (2021)
- (United Kingdom) Silverstone Circuit (2016, 2018)
- (United Arab Emirates) Yas Marina Circuit (2022)
- (South Africa) Kyalami (2027)

== Winners (2006–2014) ==
Winners of races organised by Creventic before official FIA status are:

Year	24H Dubai	12H Hungary	24H Barcelona	12H Bathurst	12H Italy-Mugello	12H Zandvoort
2014	(Switzerland) No. 20 Stadler Motorsport	(Germany) No. 4 SPS automotive-performance	(Czech Republic) No. 4 Scuderia Praha	Not organised by Creventic	(Italy) No. 7 AF Corse	(Germany) No. 33 Car Collection Motorsport
2014	(Switzerland) Adrian Amstutz (Germany) Christian Engelhart (Switzerland) Mark Ineichen (Switzerland) Rolf Ineichen (Switzerland) Marcel Matter	(Germany) Lance David Arnold (Germany) Tim Müller (Germany) Valentin Pierburg	(Czech Republic) Jaromír Jiřík (Netherlands) Peter Kox (Italy) Matteo Malucelli (Czech Republic) Jiří Písařík	Not organised by Creventic	(Portugal) Filipe Barreiros (Russia) Ilya Melnikov (Belarus) Alexander Talkanitsa, Sr. (Belarus) Alexander Talkanitsa, Jr.	(Germany) Christian Bracke (Germany) Peter Schmidt (Germany) Mirco Schultis (Netherlands) Renger van der Zande
2013	(United Arab Emirates) No. 1 Abu Dhabi by Black Falcon	(Switzerland) No. 24 Blancpain Racing	(Switzerland) No. 4 Hofor-Racing	(Australia) No. 36 Erebus Motorsport	Not held	Not held
2013	(Netherlands) Jeroen Bleekemolen (United Kingdom) Sean Edwards (United Arab Emirates) Khaled Al Qubaisi (Germany) Bernd Schneider	(Switzerland) Marc A. Hayek (Netherlands) Peter Kox (Netherlands) Nico Pronk	(Switzerland) Roland Eggimann (Netherlands) Christiaan Frankenhout (Germany) Kenneth Heyer (Switzerland) Michael Kroll	(Germany) Thomas Jäger (Germany) Alexander Roloff (Germany) Bernd Schneider	Not held	Not held
2012	(United Arab Emirates) No. 3 Abu Dhabi by Black Falcon	Not held	(Germany) No. 3 Lapidus Racing	Not organised by Creventic	Not held	Not held
2012	(Netherlands) Jeroen Bleekemolen (United Kingdom) Sean Edwards (Germany) Thomas Jäger (United Arab Emirates) Khaled Al Qubaisi	Not held	(United Kingdom) Adam Christodoulou (Netherlands) Klaas Hummel (United Kingdom) Tim Mullen (United Kingdom) Phil Quaife	Not organised by Creventic	Not held	Not held
2011	(Germany) No. 76 Need for Speed Schubert	(Belgium) No. 3 VDS Racing Adventures	(Germany) No. 2 Schubert Motorsport	Not organised by Creventic	Not held	Not held
2011	(Brazil) Augusto Farfus (Germany) Claudia Hürtgen (United States) Tommy Milner (Sweden) Edward Sandström	(Belgium) Benjamin Bailly (Belgium) Julien Schroyen (Belgium) Raphaël van der Straten	(Denmark) Michael Outzen (Germany) Peter Posavac (Sweden) Edward Sandström (Sweden) Lars Stugemo	Not organised by Creventic	Not held	Not held
2010	(France) No. 66 IMSA Performance Matmut	(Austria) No. 2 Lechner Racing	Not held	Not organised by Creventic	Not held	Not held
2010	(Germany) Marco Holzer (France) Raymond Narac (France) Patrick Pilet	(Austria) Thomas Gruber (Austria) Walter Lechner (Austria) Philip König (Austria) Nikolaus Mayr-Melnhof	Not held	Not organised by Creventic	Not held	Not held
2009	(Australia) No. 42 Land Motorsport	(Germany) No. 1 Schubert Motorsport	Not held	Not organised by Creventic	Not held	Not held
2009	(France) Gabriel Abergel (Lithuania) Andrzej Dzikevic (Germany) Niclas Kentenich (Germany) Carsten Tilke	(Denmark) Michael Outzen (Norway) Stian Sørlie (Germany) Jörg Viebahn	Not held	Not organised by Creventic	Not held	Not held
2008	(Australia) No. 39 VIP Pet Foods	(Germany) No. 52 Schubert Motorsport	Not held	Not organised by Creventic	Not held	Not held
2008	(New Zealand) Craig Baird (Australia) Klark Quinn (United Kingdom) Tony Quinn (Australia) Jonathon Webb	(Germany) Claudia Hürtgen (Norway) Stian Sørlie (Germany) Jörg Viebahn	Not held	Not organised by Creventic	Not held	Not held
2007	(Austria) No. 40 Duller Motorsport	Not held	Not held	Not organised by Creventic	Not held	Not held
2007	(United Kingdom) Jamie Campbell-Walter (Austria) Philipp Peter (Austria) Dieter Quester (Germany) Dirk Werner	Not held	Not held	Not organised by Creventic	Not held	Not held
2006	(Austria) No. 31 Duller Motorsport	Not held	Not held	Not organised by Creventic	Not held	Not held
2006	(Austria) Philipp Peter (Austria) Dieter Quester (Germany) Hans-Joachim Stuck (Austria) Toto Wolff	Not held	Not held	Not organised by Creventic	Not held	Not held

== Official FIA seasons ==
- 2015 24H Series
- 2016 24H Series
- 2017 24H Series
- 2018 24H GT Series
- 2019 24H GT Series
- 2020 24H GT Series
- 2021 24H GT Series
- 2022 24H GT Series
- 2023 24H GT Series
- 2024 24H Series
- 2025 24H Series

== Champions ==
=== Drivers ===
Year	A6	997	SP2	SP3	A5	D2	A3T	CUP1	A2	D1
2015	(Germany) Thomas Jäger (United Kingdom) Tom Onslow-Cole	(France) Gabriel Abergel (France) Patrice Lafargue (France) Paul Lafargue	(United Kingdom) James Kaye (Australia) Peter Leemhuis	(United Kingdom) John Gilbert (United Kingdom) Devon Modell	(Switzerland) Chantal Kroll (Switzerland) Martin Kroll (Germany) Bernd Küpper	(United Kingdom) Nick Barrow (United Kingdom) Tom Barrow (United Kingdom) Jamie Morrow	(United Kingdom) Nabil Moutran (United Kingdom) Ramzi Moutran (United Kingdom) Sami Moutran (United Kingdom) Phil Quaife	(Austria) Gustav Engljähringer	(Italy) Luigi Stanco (Switzerland) Stefan Tanner	(Hungary) László Csuti (Hungary) Witold Elekfy (Hungary) Norbert Nagy
Year	A6	991	SPX	SP2	SP3-GT4	TCR	CUP1	A2	A3	
2016	(Denmark) Casper Elgaard	(Germany) Kim André Hauschild (Australia) Stephen Borness	(Denmark) Martin Hald Gøtsche (Denmark) Nanna Hald Gøtsche (Germany) Klaus Werner	(France) Jean-François Demorge (France) Pascal Gibon	(Netherlands) Daan Meijer	(Netherlands) Melvin de Groot	(Belgium) Luc Moortgat	(Denmark) Claus Bertelsen (Denmark) Niels Borum (Denmark) Tim Söderhamn	(France) Stéphane Ventaja	
Year	A6	991	SPX	SP2	SP3-GT4	TCR	CUP1	A2		
2017	(Switzerland) Roland Eggimann (Netherlands) Christiaan Frankenhout (Germany) Kenneth Heyer (Switzerland) Chantal Kroll (Switzerland) Michael Kroll	(United States) Charles Espenlaub (United States) Joe Foster (United States) Charles Putman	(United States) Vic Rice	(Belgium) Raphaël van der Straten	(Republic of Ireland) Daniel O'Brien	(France) Thierry Blaise (Denmark) Kim Holmgaard	(Luxembourg) Jean-Marie Dumont (France) Nicolas Schmit	(Denmark) Jan Engelbrecht (Denmark) Jacob Kristensen (Denmark) Henrik Sørensen		
Year	A6	991	SPX	SP2	GT4					
2018	(United States) Charles Espenlaub (United States) Joe Foster (United States) Charles Putman	(France) Frédéric Ancel (France) Pascal Gibon	(United States) Dominique Bastien	(Belgium) José Close (Belgium) Raphaël van der Straten	(Belgium) Bert Redant (Belgium) Mario Timmers (Belgium) Michiel Verhaeren					
Year	A6	A6 Pro	A6 Am	991	SPX	SP2	GT4			
2019	(Czech Republic) Josef Král (Italy) Matteo Malucelli (Czech Republic) Jiří Písařík	(Czech Republic) Josef Král (Italy) Matteo Malucelli (Czech Republic) Jiří Písařík	(Germany) Edward Lewis Brauner	(France) Frédéric Ancel (France) Jean-François Demorge	(United States) Jim Briody (United Kingdom) Ricky Coomber (Netherlands) Cor Euser (Norway) Einar Thorsen	(Czech Republic) Erik Janiš (Czech Republic) Tomas Miniberger	(Austria) Michael Fischer (Austria) Thomas Jäger			
Year	GT3 Pro	GT3 Am	991	GTX	GT4	Cayman				
2020	(Germany) Robert Renauer	(United States) Charles Espenlaub (United States) Shane Lewis (United States) Charles Putman	(France) Eric Mouez	(Slovakia) Maťo Homola (Slovakia) Miro Konôpka (Slovakia) Mat'o Konopka	(Belgium) Nico Verdonck	(Luxembourg) Daniel Bohr (Germany) Thorsten Jung (Germany) Axel Sartingen (Germany) Daniel Schwerfeld				
Year	Overall	GT3 Pro	GT3 Am	991	GTX	GT4				
2021	(United States) Chandler Hull (United States) Jon Miller (Canada) Samantha Tan	(United States) Tyler Cooke (New Zealand) Brendon Leitch	(Germany) Alfred Renauer	(Russia) Andrey Mukovoz (Russia) Sergey Peregudov (Russia) Stanislav Sidoruk	(France) Philippe Bonnel	(United States) Chandler Hull (United States) Jon Miller (Canada) Samantha Tan				
Year	GT3	GT3 Pro-Am	GT3 Am	992	991	GTX	GT4			
2022	(Austria) Michael Doppelmayr (Germany) Elia Erhart (Germany) Pierre Kaffer	(Austria) Michael Doppelmayr (Germany) Elia Erhart (Germany) Pierre Kaffer	(United States) Charles Espenlaub (United States) Joe Foster (United States) Charles Putman	(Belgium) Ayrton Redant (Belgium) Bert Redant (Belgium) Yannick Redant	(Spain) Pablo Burguera	(United States) Jean-Francois Brunot (China) Kerong Li	(United States) Catesby Jones (Belgium) Wim Spinoy			
Year	GT3	GT3 Pro-Am	GT3 Am	992	992 Am	GTX	GT4			
2023	(Belgium) Mathieu Detry	(Germany) Elia Erhart (Germany) Pierre Kaffer	(United States) Charles Espenlaub (United States) Shane Lewis (United States) Charles Putman	(Italy) Sabino de Castro (Romania) Sergiu Nicolae	(Germany) Philip Hamprecht (Sweden) Niclas Jönsson (United States) Tracy Krohn	(Lithuania) Audrius Butkevicius (Italy) Nicola Michelon (Lithuania) Paulius Paskevicius	(Netherlands) Roelof Bruins (Canada) Steven Cho (South Korea) Kim Jong-kyum			
Year	GT3	GT3 Pro-Am	GT3 Am	992	992 Am	GTX	GT4	TCE	TCX	
2024	(Germany) Ralf Bohn (United States) Jason Hart (United States) Scott Noble	(Austria) Michael Doppelmayr (Germany) Elia Erhart (Germany) Pierre Kaffer	(Germany) Ralf Bohn (United States) Jason Hart (United States) Scott Noble	(Belgium) Ayrton Redant (Belgium) Yannick Redant	(Germany) Philip Hamprecht (Sweden) Niclas Jönsson (United States) Tracy Krohn	(France) Lionel Amrouche (France) Philippe Bonnel (France) Gilles Courtois	(Seychelles) Aliyyah Koloc (Czech Republic) Adam Lacko (Czech Republic) David Vrsecky	(Germany) Henning Eschweiler (Mexico) Benito Tagle	(Germany) Henning Eschweiler (Mexico) Benito Tagle	
2025	(Austria) Klaus Bachler (Germany) Jörg Dreisow (Germany) Manuel Lauck	(Austria) Klaus Bachler (Germany) Jörg Dreisow (Germany) Manuel Lauck	(Kyrgyzstan) Andrey Solukovtsev (Cyprus) Vasily Vladykin	(Germany) Philip Hamprecht (Sweden) Niclas Jönsson (United States) Tracy Krohn	(Germany) Philip Hamprecht (Sweden) Niclas Jönsson (United States) Tracy Krohn	(France) Philippe Bonnel (France) Cyril Calmon	(United Kingdom) Matt George (United Kingdom) Christopher Jones (United Kingdom) Neville Jones	None awarded		

=== Teams (2015–2017) ===
Classes	2015	2016	2017
A6	(United Kingdom) Ram Racing	(Switzerland) No. 10 Hofor-Racing	(Switzerland) No. 10 Hofor-Racing
SPX	Not awarded	(Germany) No. 45 Artthea Sport	(United Arab Emirates) GDL Racing Middle East
997	(France) Ruffier Racing	Not awarded	
991	Not awarded	(Germany) No. 73 HRT Performance	(Germany) PROsport Performance
SP2	MARC Cars Australia 1	(Belgium) No. 84 Speedlover	(Belgium) VDS Racing Adventures
SP3	(United Kingdom) Speedworks Motorsport 2	(Netherlands) No. 103 JR Motorsport	(United Kingdom) Optimum Motorsport
TCR	Not awarded	(Lebanon) No. 1 Memac Ogilvy Duel Racing	(France) Team Altran Peugeot
A5	(Germany) Hofor-Kuepper Racing	Not awarded	
D2	(United Kingdom) Saxon Motorsport	Not awarded	
A3 (Note: Class named A3T in 2015.)	(Lebanon) Memac Ogilvy Duel Racing	(France) Team Altran Peugeot	(Portugal) Parkalgar Racing Team
CUP1	(Germany) Bonk Motorsport	(Luxembourg) No. 235 DUWO Racing	(Luxembourg) DUWO Racing
A2	(Switzerland) presenza.eu Racing Team Clio 1	(Denmark) No. 171 Team K-Rejser	(Denmark) Team Eva Solo/K-Rejser
D1	(Hungary) RCM Motorsport	Not awarded	
Overall	(Lebanon) Memac Ogilvy Duel Racing	Not awarded	(Switzerland) No. 10 Hofor-Racing

== See also ==
- Touring Car Endurance Series
- Dubai 24 Hour
- 24H Series Middle East
