= 2024 12 Hours of Spa-Francorchamps =

The layout of the Circuit de Spa-Francorchamps, were the race was held.

The 2024 12 Hours of Spa-Francorchamps (formally known as the Hankook 12 Hours of Spa-Francorchamps) was an endurance sportscar racing held on 20 and 21 April 2024, as the second of five rounds of the 2024 24H Series. It was the sixth running of the event as part of the 24H Series.

== Background ==
The event was announced on 16 October 2023 along with the rest of the 2024 24H Series calendar.

== Entry list ==
The entry list was revealed on 19 April 2024, and featured 45 cars: 15 GT3 cars, 18 Porsche 992 GT3 Cup cars, 4 GTX cars, 5 GT4 cars, and 3 TCX cars.

No.	Entrant	Car	Class	Driver 1	Driver 2	Driver 3	Driver 4	Driver 5
GT3 (15 entries)
1	(Antigua and Barbuda) HAAS RT	Audi R8 LMS Evo II	Am	(Belgium) Xavier Knauf	(Switzerland) Tim Müller	(Belgium) Gregory Servais		
5	(Switzerland) Kessel Racing	Ferrari 296 GT3	Am	(United Kingdom) Andrew Gilbert	(Switzerland) Nicolò Rosi	(Spain) Fran Rueda	(Netherlands) Fons Scheltema	
11	(Switzerland) Hofor Racing	Mercedes-AMG GT3	Am	(Germany) Kenneth Heyer	(Switzerland) Michael Kroll	(Germany) Max Partl	(Germany) Alexander Prinz	(Switzerland) Chantal Prinz
12	(Germany) Car Collection Motorsport	Porsche 911 GT3 R (992)	PA	(United States) "Hash"	(Switzerland) Alex Fontana	(Switzerland) Ivan Jacoma	(Switzerland) Yannick Mettler	
18	(France) Saintéloc Junior Team	Audi R8 LMS Evo II	PA	(Austria) Michael Doppelmayr	(Germany) Elia Erhart	(Switzerland) Ernst Inderbitzin	(Germany) Pierre Kaffer	
34	(Germany) Land Motorsport	Audi R8 LMS Evo II	Am	(Norway) Wiggo Dalmo	(Germany) Max Edelhoff	(Germany) Dr. Johannes Kirchhof	(Germany) Tim Vogler	
44	(Slovakia) ARC Bratislava	Lamborghini Huracán GT3 Evo	Am	(Slovakia) Anton Kiaba	(Slovakia) Miro Konôpka	(Italy) Mateo Llarena	(Slovakia) Zdeno Mikulasko	
58	(Italy) MP Racing	Mercedes-AMG GT3 Evo	Am	(Italy) Corinna Gostner	(Italy) David Gostner	(Italy) Manuela Gostner	(Italy) Thomas Gostner	
69	(Lithuania) RD Signs - Siauliai racing team	Lamborghini Huracán GT3	PA	(Lithuania) Audrius Butkevicius	(Italy) Nicola Michelon	(Lithuania) Paulius Paskevicius		
71	(Lithuania) Juta Racing	Audi R8 LMS Evo II	PA	(Lithuania) Arunas Geciauskas	(Sweden) Lukas Sundahl	(United Kingdom) Lars Viljoen		
80	(Germany) Car Collection Motorsport	Porsche 911 GT3 R (992)	Am	(Hong Kong) Antares Au	(Hong Kong) Jonathan Hui	(Hong Kong) Kevin Tse		
84	(New Zealand) EBM	Porsche 911 GT3 R (992)	PA	(Malaysia) Adrian D'Silva	(Australia) Shae Davies	(Estonia) Martin Rump		
85	(United States) CP Racing	Mercedes-AMG GT3 Evo	Am	(United States) Charles Espenlaub	(United States) Joe Foster	(United States) Shane Lewis	(United States) Charles Putman	
90	(Spain) E2P Racing	Porsche 911 GT3 R (991.2)	PA	(Spain) Pablo Burguera	(Portugal) Álvaro Parente	(Spain) Antonio Sainero		
91	(Germany) Herberth Motorsport	Porsche 911 GT3 R (992)	Am	(Germany) Ralf Bohn	(United States) Jason Hart	(United States) Scott Noble		
GTX (4 entries)
701	(France) Vortex V8	Vortex 2.0		(France) Lionel Amrouche	(France) Philippe Bonnel	(France) Gilles Courtois		
702	(France) Vortex V8	Vortex 2.0		(France) Arnaud Gomez	(France) Olivier Gomez	(France) Lucas Sugliano		
719	(Germany) 9und11 Racing	Porsche 991 GT3 Cup II MR		(Germany) Georg Goder	(Germany) Tim Scheerbarth	(Germany) Martin Schlüter		
795	(France) Team CMR	Ginetta G56 Cup		(United Kingdom) Mike Simpson	(United Kingdom) Freddie Tomlinson	(United Kingdom) Lawrence Tomlinson		
992 (18 entries)
902	(Denmark) Holmgaard Motorsport	Porsche 992 GT3 Cup	P	(Denmark) Jonas Holmgaard	(Denmark) Magnus Holmgaard	(Germany) Marlon Menden	(France) Stéphane Perrin	(Denmark) Martin Vedel Mortensen
903	(Belgium) Red Ant Racing	Porsche 992 GT3 Cup	P	(Lithuania) Julius Adomavičius	(Belgium) Ayrton Redant	(Belgium) Yannick Redant		
904	(Belgium) Red Ant Racing	Porsche 992 GT3 Cup	P	(Belgium) Peter Guelinckx	(Belgium) Michiel Haverans	(Belgium) Brent Verheyen		
907	(Germany) RPM Racing	Porsche 992 GT3 Cup	Am	(Germany) Philip Hamprecht	(Sweden) Niclas Jönsson	(United States) Tracy Krohn		
908	(France) SebLajoux Racing by DUWO Racing	Porsche 992 GT3 Cup	Am	(France) Gilles Blasco	(France) Jean-François Demorge	(France) Philippe Polette	(France) Benjamin Roy	
909	(Netherlands) Red Camel-Jordans.nl	Porsche 992 GT3 Cup	P	(Netherlands) Ivo Breukers	(Netherlands) Luc Breukers	(Netherlands) Rik Breukers	(Switzerland) Fabian Danz	
911	(South Korea) Hankook Competition	Porsche 992 GT3 Cup	Am	(South Korea) Roelof Bruins	(Canada) Steven Cho	(Hong Kong) Dr. Ma		
917	(Switzerland) Orchid Racing Team	Porsche 992 GT3 Cup	Am	(Switzerland) Daniel Gillioz	(France) Laurent Misbach	(Switzerland) Alexandre Mottet		
925	(Netherlands) Bas Koeten Racing	Porsche 992 GT3 Cup	Am	(Netherlands) Marcel van Berlo	(Netherlands) Bob Herber			
927	(Germany) SRS Team Sorg Rennsport	Porsche 992 GT3 Cup	Am	(Germany) Heiko Eichenberg	(Switzerland) Patrik Grütter	(Austria) Bernhard Wagner		
967	(Germany) HRT Performance	Porsche 992 GT3 Cup	Am	(Switzerland) Linus Diener	(Germany) Kim André Hauschild	(Italy) Amadeo Pampanini	(Switzerland) Nicolas Stürzinger	
969	(San Marino) GDL Racing	Porsche 992 GT3 Cup	Am	(United States) Dallas Carroll	(United States) Matt Kehoe	(United States) Mark Smith		
972	(Netherlands) Hans Weijs Motorsport	Porsche 992 GT3 Cup	Am	(Netherlands) Mark van Eldik	(Netherlands) Paul Meijer	(Netherlands) Ralph Poppelaars	(Netherlands) Edwin Schilt	
979	(Belgium) Speedlover	Porsche 992 GT3 Cup	Am	(Belgium) Olivier Dons	(Belgium) Wim Meulders	(Belgium) Rik Renmans		
985	(Austria) Neuhofer Rennsport	Porsche 992 GT3 Cup	Am	(Austria) Felix Neuhofer	(Austria) Markus Neuhofer	(Germany) Manuel Zlof		
988	(Germany) MRS GT Racing	Porsche 992 GT3 Cup	Am	(Costa Rica) Amadeo Quiros	(Estonia) Antti Rammo	(El Salvador) Rolando Saca		
992	(Netherlands) NKPP Racing by Bas Koeten Racing	Porsche 992 GT3 Cup	Am	(Netherlands) Gijs Bessem	(Netherlands) Harry Hilders			
993	(Lithuania) Porsche Baltic	Porsche 992 GT3 Cup	P	(Lithuania) Robertas Kupcikas	(Lithuania) Domas Raudonis	(Lithuania) Tautvydas Rudokas		
GT4 (5 entries)
400	(Sweden) ALFAB Racing	McLaren Artura GT4		(Sweden) Erik Behrens	(Sweden) Daniel Roos			
416	(United Arab Emirates) Buggyra ZM Racing	Mercedes-AMG GT4		(Seychelles) Aliyyah Koloc	(Czech Republic) Adam Lacko	(Czech Republic) David Vrsecky		
419	(Belgium) Hamofa Motorsport	BMW M4 GT4 Gen II		(Belgium) Kris Verhoeven	(Belgium) Mark Verhoeven	(Belgium) Rob Verhoeven		
424	(Germany) Lionspeed GP	Porsche 718 Cayman GT4 RS Clubsport		(Germany) Dennis Bohn	(United States) José Garcia	(Germany) Patrick Kolb	(United States) Daniel Miller	
438	(United Kingdom) Simpson Motorsport	BMW M4 GT4 Gen II		(United Kingdom) Ravi Ramyead	(United Kingdom) Charlie Robertson	(Cyprus) Vasily Vladykin		
TCE/TCX (3 entries)
127	(Germany) SRS Team Sorg Rennsport	Porsche 718 Cayman GT4 Clubsport		(Germany) Henning Eschweiler	(Germany) Christoph Krombach	(Germany) Heinz Jürgen Kroner	(Mexico) Benito Tagle	
169	(Belgium) HY Racing	Porsche Cayman GTS		(Belgium) "Brody"	(Italy) Bruno Barbaro	(Belgium) Jacques Derenne	(France) Brice Pineau	
178	(United Kingdom) CWS Engineering	Ginetta G55 Supercup		(United Kingdom) Daniel Morris	(United Kingdom) Colin White			

GT3 entries
Icon	Class
PA	GT3-Pro Am
Am	GT3-Am
992 entries
Icon	Class
P	992-Pro
Am	992-Am

== Schedule ==
Date	Time (local: CEST)	Event	Duration
Friday, 19 April	12:10 - 13:40	Free Practice	90 Minutes
Friday, 19 April	15:30 - 16:25	Qualifying	3x15 Minutes
Saturday, 20 April	12:50 - 17:50	Race - Part 1	5 Hours
Sunday, 21 April	10:50 - 17:50	Race - Part 2	7 Hours

== Practice ==
The first and only practice session started on 12:10 CEST on Friday. Gregory Servais ended up quickest in the No. 1 HAAS RT Audi, with a lap time of 2:45.856. Ralf Bohn was second-quickest in the No. 91 Herberth Motorsport Porsche. Martin Rump was quickest in the GT3 Pro/Am class in the No. 84 EBM Porsche.

Class	No.	Entrant	Driver	Time
GT3	1	(Antigua and Barbuda) HAAS RT	(Belgium) Gregory Servais	2:45.856
GTX	702	(France) Vortex V8	(France) Arnaud Gomez	2:57.376
992	985	(Austria) Neuhofer Rennsport	(Austria) Felix Neuhofer	2:48.761
GT4	438	(United Kingdom) Simpson Motorsport	(Cyprus) Vasily Vladykin	2:54.739
TCE	178	(United Kingdom) CWS Engineering	(United Kingdom) Colin White	3:15.654

- Note: Only the fastest car in each class is shown.

== Qualifying ==
Qualifying was split into three parts. The average of the best times per qualifying session determined the starting order. Car Collection Motorsport locked out the front row, the No. 12 Porsche in front of the No. 80 Porsche. The No. 1 HAAS RT Audi secured third place. However, the No. 80 Porsche was promoted to pole position after the No. 12 crew failed to attend the drivers' meeting.

=== Qualifying results ===
Pole position winners in each class are marked in bold.

Pos.	Class	No.	Team	Q1	Q2	Q3	Avg
1	**GT3 Pro/Am**	**12**	(Germany) **Car Collection Motorsport**	2:44.222	2:40.513	2:39.566	**2:41.433**
2	**GT3 Am**	**80**	(Germany) **Car Collection Motorsport**	2:44.348	2:42.405	2:40.297	**2:42.350**
3	GT3 Am	1	(Antigua and Barbuda) HAAS RT	2:42.539	2:41.953	2:43.020	2:42.504
4	GT3 Am	44	(Slovakia) ARC Bratislava	2:49.656	2:39.724	2:39.160	2:42.846
5	GT3 Am	91	(Germany) Herberth Motorsport	2:51.065	2:41.129	2:38.007	2:43.400
6	GT3 Am	5	(Switzerland) Kessel Racing	2:48.523	2:46.314	2:37.865	2:44.234
7	**992 Pro**	**903**	(Belgium) **Red Ant Racing**	2:45.405	2:45.210	2:42.133	**2:44.249**
8	GT3 Am	11	(Switzerland) Hofor Racing	2:46.549	2:43.373	2:43.047	2:44.323
9	GT3 Am	34	(Germany) Land Motorsport	2:52.723	2:43.201	2:38.847	2:44.923
10	GT3 Pro/Am	18	(France) Saintéloc Junior Team	2:54.782	2:43.365	2:37.186	2:45.111
11	GT3 Pro/Am	71	(Lithuania) Juta Racing	2:48.511	2:45.362	2:41.830	2:45.234
12	GT3 Pro/Am	69	(Lithuania) RD Signs - Siauliai racing team	2:45.724	2:43.729	2:47.109	2:45.520
13	992 Pro	909	(Netherlands) Red Camel-Jordans.nl	2:48.578	2:45.298	2:43.240	2:45.705
14	**GTX**	**702**	(France) **Vortex V8**	2:49.934	2:47.814	2:40.417	**2:46.055**
15	**992 Am**	**972**	(Netherlands) **Hans Weijs Motorsport**	2:49.219	2:46.552	2:43.059	**2:46.276**
16	GTX	795	(France) Team CMR	2:55.357	2:45.154	2:40.849	2:47.120
17	GT3 Pro/Am	90	(Spain) E2P Racing	2:59.454	2:45.983	2:37.217	2:47.551
18	992 Am	925	(Netherlands) Bas Koeten Racing	2:48.736	2:48.212	2:45.935	2:47.627
19	992 Pro	904	(Belgium) Red Ant Racing	2:53.901	2:45.591	2:45.036	2:48.176
20	992 Pro	902	(Denmark) Holmgaard Motorsport	2:51.500	2:49.096	2:46.678	2:49.091
21	GT3 Am	58	(Italy) MP Racing	2:55.446	2:45.028	2:47.079	2:49.184
22	992 Am	967	(Germany) HRT Performance	2:55.450	2:49.611	2:43.994	2:49.685
23	992 Am	992	(Netherlands) NKPP Racing by Bas Koeten Racing	2:53.403	2:49.906	2:46.526	2:49.945
24	GT3 Am	85	(United States) CP Racing	3:03.462	2:46.659	2:40.518	2:50.213
25	992 Am	911	(South Korea) Hankook Competition	2:59.664	2:47.990	2:44.472	2:50.708
26	992 Am	985	(Austria) Neuhofer Rennsport	2:59.045	2:54.510	2:42.677	2:52.077
27	992 Am	917	(Switzerland) Orchid Racing Team	2:54.429	2:54.789	2:48.720	2:52.646
28	**GT4**	**400**	(Sweden) **ALFAB Racing**	2:57.713	2:49.914	2:50.422	**2:52.683**
29	992 Am	927	(Germany) SRS Team Sorg Rennsport	2:51.213	2:48.954	2:58.320	2:52.829
30	GT4	438	(United Kingdom) Simpson Motorsport	2:54.794	2:54.132	2:50.358	2:53.094
31	GT4	424	(Germany) Lionspeed GP	2:54.457	2:54.015	2:51.221	2:53.231
32	992 Pro	993	(Lithuania) Porsche Baltic	3:07.111	2:48.012	2:45.695	2:53.606
33	992 Am	907	(Germany) RPM Racing	2:53.532	3:00.985	2:46.812	2:53.776
34	992 Am	969	(San Marino) GDL Racing	2:57.082	2:51.597	2:53.084	2:53.921
35	GT4	416	(United Arab Emirates) Buggyra ZM Racing	2:56.135	2:52.970	2:52.676	2:53.927
36	992 Am	979	(Belgium) Speedlover	2:52.958	2:59.903	2:56.661	2:56.507
37	992 Am	908	(France) SebLajoux Racing by DUWO Racing	3:11.487	2:51.184	2:48.869	2:57.180
38	GTX	701	(France) Vortex V8	3:00.737	3:10.746	2:50.154	3:00.545
39	GT4	419	(Belgium) Hamofa Motorsport	3:14.454	2:56.574	2:56.447	3:02.491
40	GTX	719	(Germany) 9und11 Racing	3:17.802	3:07.656	2:42.840	3:02.766
41	**TCX**	**178**	(United Kingdom) **CWS Racing**	3:07.265	3:03.680	2:59.158	**3:03.367**
42	992 Am	988	(Germany) MRS GT Racing	3:41.784	2:50.667	2:49.098	3:07.183
43	TCX	127	(Germany) SRS Team Sorg Rennsport	3:21.880	3:16.330	3:03.061	3:13.757
44	TCX	169	(Belgium) HY Racing	3:21.086	3:21.190	3:12.408	3:18.228
	GT3 Pro/Am	84	(New Zealand) EBM	No time	No time	No time	No time

== Race ==
=== Part 1 ===
Class winners are in bold.

Pos	Class	No	Team	Drivers	Car	Time/Reason	Laps
Pos	Class	No	Team	Drivers	Engine	Time/Reason	Laps
1	**GT3 Am**	**91**	**(Germany) Herberth Motorsport**	**(Germany) Ralf Bohn (United States) Jason Hart (United States) Scott Noble**	**Porsche 911 GT3 R (992)**	**5:01:52.787**	**94**
1	**GT3 Am**	**91**	**(Germany) Herberth Motorsport**	**(Germany) Ralf Bohn (United States) Jason Hart (United States) Scott Noble**	**Porsche M97/80 4.2 L Flat-6**	**5:01:52.787**	**94**
2	**GT3 Pro/Am**	**69**	**(Lithuania) RD Signs - Siauliai racing team**	**(Lithuania) Audrius Butkevicius (Italy) Nicola Machelon (Lithuania) Paulius Paskevicius**	**Lamborghini Huracán GT3**	**+37.395**	**94**
2	**GT3 Pro/Am**	**69**	**(Lithuania) RD Signs - Siauliai racing team**	**(Lithuania) Audrius Butkevicius (Italy) Nicola Machelon (Lithuania) Paulius Paskevicius**	**Lamborghini DGF 5.2 L V10**	**+37.395**	**94**
3	GT3 Am	34	(Germany) Land Motorsport	(Norway) Wiggo Dalmo (Germany) Max Edelhoff (Germany) Dr. Johannes Kirchhoff (Germany) Tim Vogler	Audi R8 LMS Evo II	+2:03.700	94
3	GT3 Am	34	(Germany) Land Motorsport	(Norway) Wiggo Dalmo (Germany) Max Edelhoff (Germany) Dr. Johannes Kirchhoff (Germany) Tim Vogler	Audi 5.2 L V10	+2:03.700	94
4	GT3 Pro/Am	12	(Germany) Car Collection Motorsport	(United States) "Hash" (Switzerland) Alex Fontana (Switzerland) Ivan Jacoma (Switzerland) Yannick Mettler	Porsche 911 GT3 R (992)	+2:14.904	94
4	GT3 Pro/Am	12	(Germany) Car Collection Motorsport	(United States) "Hash" (Switzerland) Alex Fontana (Switzerland) Ivan Jacoma (Switzerland) Yannick Mettler	Porsche M97/80 4.2 L Flat-6	+2:14.904	94
5	GT3 Am	85	(United States) CP Racing	(United States) Charles Espenlaub (United States) Joe Foster (United States) Shane Lewis (United States) Charles Putman	Mercedes-AMG GT3 Evo	+2:20.974	94
5	GT3 Am	85	(United States) CP Racing	(United States) Charles Espenlaub (United States) Joe Foster (United States) Shane Lewis (United States) Charles Putman	Mercedes-AMG M159 6.2 L V8	+2:20.974	94
6	GT3 Pro/Am	90	(Spain) E2P Racing	(Spain) Pablo Burguera (Portugal) Álvaro Parente (Spain) Antonio Sainero	Porsche 911 GT3 R (991.2)	+2:31.664	94
6	GT3 Pro/Am	90	(Spain) E2P Racing	(Spain) Pablo Burguera (Portugal) Álvaro Parente (Spain) Antonio Sainero	Porsche 4.0 L Flat-6	+2:31.664	94
7	GT3 Pro/Am	71	(Lithuania) Juta Racing	(Lithuania) Arunas Geciauskas (Sweden) Lukas Sundahl (United Kingdom) Lars Viljoen	Audi R8 LMS Evo II	+1 Lap	93
7	GT3 Pro/Am	71	(Lithuania) Juta Racing	(Lithuania) Arunas Geciauskas (Sweden) Lukas Sundahl (United Kingdom) Lars Viljoen	Audi 5.2 L V10	+1 Lap	93
8	GT3 Am	11	(Switzerland) Hofor Racing	(Germany) Kenneth Heyer (Switzerland) Michael Kroll (Germany) Max Partl (Germany) Alexander Prinz (Switzerland) Chantal Prinz	Mercedes-AMG GT3	+1 Lap	93
8	GT3 Am	11	(Switzerland) Hofor Racing	(Germany) Kenneth Heyer (Switzerland) Michael Kroll (Germany) Max Partl (Germany) Alexander Prinz (Switzerland) Chantal Prinz	Mercedes-AMG M159 6.2 L V8	+1 Lap	93
9	GT3 Am	1	(Antigua and Barbuda) HAAS RT	(Belgium) Xavier Knauf (Switzerland) Tim Müller (Belgium) Gregory Servais	Audi R8 LMS Evo II	+1 Lap	93
9	GT3 Am	1	(Antigua and Barbuda) HAAS RT	(Belgium) Xavier Knauf (Switzerland) Tim Müller (Belgium) Gregory Servais	Audi 5.2 L V10	+1 Lap	93
10	GT3 Am	80	(Germany) Car Collection Motorsport	(Hong Kong) Antares Au (Hong Kong) Jonathan Hui (Hong Kong) Kevin Tse	Porsche 911 GT3 R (992)	+1 Lap	93
10	GT3 Am	80	(Germany) Car Collection Motorsport	(Hong Kong) Antares Au (Hong Kong) Jonathan Hui (Hong Kong) Kevin Tse	Porsche M97/80 4.2 L Flat-6	+1 Lap	93
11	**992 Pro**	**903**	**(Belgium) Red Ant Racing**	**(Lithuania) Julius Adomavičius (Belgium) Ayrton Redant (Belgium) Yannick Redant**	**Porsche 992 GT3 Cup**	**+2 Laps**	**92**
11	**992 Pro**	**903**	**(Belgium) Red Ant Racing**	**(Lithuania) Julius Adomavičius (Belgium) Ayrton Redant (Belgium) Yannick Redant**	**Porsche 4.0 L Flat-6**	**+2 Laps**	**92**
12	992 Pro	904	(Belgium) Red Ant Racing	(Belgium) Peter Guelinckx (Belgium) Michiel Haverans (Belgium) Brent Verheyen	Porsche 992 GT3 Cup	+2 Laps	92
12	992 Pro	904	(Belgium) Red Ant Racing	(Belgium) Peter Guelinckx (Belgium) Michiel Haverans (Belgium) Brent Verheyen	Porsche 4.0 L Flat-6	+2 Laps	92
13	**992 Am**	**972**	**(Netherlands) Hans Weijs Motorsport**	**(Netherlands) Mark van Eldik (Netherlands) Paul Meijer (Netherlands) Ralph Poppelaars (Netherlands) Edwin Schilt**	**Porsche 992 GT3 Cup**	**+2 Laps**	**92**
13	**992 Am**	**972**	**(Netherlands) Hans Weijs Motorsport**	**(Netherlands) Mark van Eldik (Netherlands) Paul Meijer (Netherlands) Ralph Poppelaars (Netherlands) Edwin Schilt**	**Porsche 4.0 L Flat-6**	**+2 Laps**	**92**
14	GT3 Pro/Am	84	(New Zealand) EBM	(Malaysia) Adrian D'Silva (Australia) Shae Davies (Estonia) Martin Rump	Porsche 911 GT3 R (992)	+3 Laps	91
14	GT3 Pro/Am	84	(New Zealand) EBM	(Malaysia) Adrian D'Silva (Australia) Shae Davies (Estonia) Martin Rump	Porsche M97/80 4.2 L Flat-6	+3 Laps	91
15	GT3 Pro/Am	18	(France) Saintéloc Junior Team	(Austria) Michael Doppelmayr (Germany) Elia Erhart (Switzerland) Ernst Inderbitzin (Germany) Pierre Kaffer	Audi R8 LMS Evo II	+3 Laps	91
15	GT3 Pro/Am	18	(France) Saintéloc Junior Team	(Austria) Michael Doppelmayr (Germany) Elia Erhart (Switzerland) Ernst Inderbitzin (Germany) Pierre Kaffer	Audi 5.2 L V10	+3 Laps	91
16	GT3 Am	44	(Slovakia) ARC Bratislava	(Slovakia) Anton Kiaba (Slovakia) Miro Konôpka (Italy) Mateo Llarena (Slovakia) Zdeno Mikulasko	Lamborghini Huracán GT3 Evo	+4 Laps	90
16	GT3 Am	44	(Slovakia) ARC Bratislava	(Slovakia) Anton Kiaba (Slovakia) Miro Konôpka (Italy) Mateo Llarena (Slovakia) Zdeno Mikulasko	Lamborghini DGF 5.2 L V10	+4 Laps	90
17	992 Am	907	(Germany) RPM Racing	(Germany) Philip Hamprecht (Sweden) Niclas Jönsson (United States) Tracy Krohn	Porsche 992 GT3 Cup	+4 Laps	90
17	992 Am	907	(Germany) RPM Racing	(Germany) Philip Hamprecht (Sweden) Niclas Jönsson (United States) Tracy Krohn	Porsche 4.0 L Flat-6	+4 Laps	90
18	992 Am	967	(Germany) HRT Performance	(Switzerland) Linus Diener (Germany) Kim André Hauschild (Italy) Amadeo Pampanini (Switzerland) Nicolas Stürzinger	Porsche 992 GT3 Cup	+4 Laps	90
18	992 Am	967	(Germany) HRT Performance	(Switzerland) Linus Diener (Germany) Kim André Hauschild (Italy) Amadeo Pampanini (Switzerland) Nicolas Stürzinger	Porsche 4.0 L Flat-6	+4 Laps	90
19	992 Am	927	(Germany) SRS Team Sorg Rennsport	(Germany) Heiko Eichenberg (Switzerland) Patrik Grütter (Austria) Bernhard Wagner	Porsche 992 GT3 Cup	+4 Laps	90
19	992 Am	927	(Germany) SRS Team Sorg Rennsport	(Germany) Heiko Eichenberg (Switzerland) Patrik Grütter (Austria) Bernhard Wagner	Porsche 4.0 L Flat-6	+4 Laps	90
20	992 Am	908	(France) SebLajoux Racing by DUWO Racing	(France) Gilles Blasco (France) Jean-François Demorge (France) Philippe Polette (France) Benjamin Roy	Porsche 992 GT3 Cup	+5 Laps	89
20	992 Am	908	(France) SebLajoux Racing by DUWO Racing	(France) Gilles Blasco (France) Jean-François Demorge (France) Philippe Polette (France) Benjamin Roy	Porsche 4.0 L Flat-6	+5 Laps	89
21	992 Am	988	(Germany) MRS GT Racing	(Costa Rica) Amadeo Quiros (Estonia) Antti Rammo (El Salvador) Rolando Saca	Porsche 992 GT3 Cup	+5 Laps	89
21	992 Am	988	(Germany) MRS GT Racing	(Costa Rica) Amadeo Quiros (Estonia) Antti Rammo (El Salvador) Rolando Saca	Porsche 4.0 L Flat-6	+5 Laps	89
22	992 Pro	993	(Lithuania) Porsche Baltic	(Lithuania) Robertas Kupcikas (Lithuania) Domas Raudonis (Lithuania) Tautvydas Rudokas	Porsche 992 GT3 Cup	+5 Laps	89
22	992 Pro	993	(Lithuania) Porsche Baltic	(Lithuania) Robertas Kupcikas (Lithuania) Domas Raudonis (Lithuania) Tautvydas Rudokas	Porsche 4.0 L Flat-6	+5 Laps	89
23	GT3 Am	58	(Italy) MP Racing	(Italy) Corinna Gostner (Italy) David Gostner (Italy) Manuela Gostner (Italy) Thomas Gostner	Mercedes-AMG GT3 Evo	+5 Laps	89
23	GT3 Am	58	(Italy) MP Racing	(Italy) Corinna Gostner (Italy) David Gostner (Italy) Manuela Gostner (Italy) Thomas Gostner	Mercedes-AMG M159 6.2 L V8	+5 Laps	89
24	992 Am	925	(Netherlands) Bas Koeten Racing	(Netherlands) Marcel van Berlo (Netherlands) Bob Herber	Porsche 992 GT3 Cup	+5 Laps	89
24	992 Am	925	(Netherlands) Bas Koeten Racing	(Netherlands) Marcel van Berlo (Netherlands) Bob Herber	Porsche 4.0 L Flat-6	+5 Laps	89
25	992 Am	979	(Belgium) Speedlover	(Belgium) Olivier Dons (Belgium) Wim Meulders (Belgium) Rik Renmans	Porsche 992 GT3 Cup	+5 Laps	89
25	992 Am	979	(Belgium) Speedlover	(Belgium) Olivier Dons (Belgium) Wim Meulders (Belgium) Rik Renmans	Porsche 4.0 L Flat-6	+5 Laps	89
26	**GT4**	**424**	**(Germany) Lionspeed GP**	**(Germany) Dennis Bohn (United States) José Garcia (Germany) Patrick Kolb (United States) Daniel Miller**	**Porsche 718 Cayman GT4 RS Clubsport**	**+6 Laps**	**88**
26	**GT4**	**424**	**(Germany) Lionspeed GP**	**(Germany) Dennis Bohn (United States) José Garcia (Germany) Patrick Kolb (United States) Daniel Miller**	**Porsche 4.0 L Flat-6**	**+6 Laps**	**88**
27	**GTX**	**719**	**(Germany) 9und11 Racing**	**(Germany) Georg Goder (Germany) Tim Scheerbarth (Germany) Martin Schlüter**	**Porsche 911 GT3 Cup II MR**	**+6 Laps**	**88**
27	**GTX**	**719**	**(Germany) 9und11 Racing**	**(Germany) Georg Goder (Germany) Tim Scheerbarth (Germany) Martin Schlüter**	**Porsche 4.0 L Flat-6**	**+6 Laps**	**88**
28	992 Am	917	(Switzerland) Orchid Racing Team	(Switzerland) Daniel Gillioz (France) Laurent Misbach (Switzerland) Alexandre Mottet	Porsche 992 GT3 Cup	+6 Laps	88
28	992 Am	917	(Switzerland) Orchid Racing Team	(Switzerland) Daniel Gillioz (France) Laurent Misbach (Switzerland) Alexandre Mottet	Porsche 4.0 L Flat-6	+6 Laps	88
29	992 Pro	902	(Denmark) Holmgaard Motorsport	(Denmark) Jonas Holmgaard (Denmark) Magnus Holmgaard (Germany) Marlon Menden (France) Stéphane Perrin (Denmark) Martin Vedel Mortensen	Porsche 992 GT3 Cup	+6 Laps	88
29	992 Pro	902	(Denmark) Holmgaard Motorsport	(Denmark) Jonas Holmgaard (Denmark) Magnus Holmgaard (Germany) Marlon Menden (France) Stéphane Perrin (Denmark) Martin Vedel Mortensen	Porsche 4.0 L Flat-6	+6 Laps	88
30	992 Am	911	(South Korea) Hankook Competition	(South Korea) Roelof Bruins (Canada) Steven Cho (Hong Kong) Dr. Ma	Porsche 992 GT3 Cup	+7 Laps	87
30	992 Am	911	(South Korea) Hankook Competition	(South Korea) Roelof Bruins (Canada) Steven Cho (Hong Kong) Dr. Ma	Porsche 4.0 L Flat-6	+7 Laps	87
31	GT4	416	(United Arab Emirates) Buggyra ZM Racing	(Seychelles) Aliyyah Koloc (Czech Republic) Adam Lacko (Czech Republic) David Vrsecky	Mercedes-AMG GT4	+7 Laps	87
31	GT4	416	(United Arab Emirates) Buggyra ZM Racing	(Seychelles) Aliyyah Koloc (Czech Republic) Adam Lacko (Czech Republic) David Vrsecky	Mercedes-AMG M178 4.0 L V8	+7 Laps	87
32	GT4	419	(Belgium) Hamofa Motorsport	(Belgium) Kris Verhoeven (Belgium) Mark Verhoeven (Belgium) Rob Verhoeven	BMW M4 GT4 Gen II	+8 Laps	86
32	GT4	419	(Belgium) Hamofa Motorsport	(Belgium) Kris Verhoeven (Belgium) Mark Verhoeven (Belgium) Rob Verhoeven	BMW N55 3.0 L Twin-turbo I6	+8 Laps	86
33 DNF	992 Am	969	(San Marino) GDL Racing	(United States) Dallas Carroll (United States) Matt Kehoe (United States) Mark Smith	Porsche 992 GT3 Cup	+11 Laps	83
33 DNF	992 Am	969	(San Marino) GDL Racing	(United States) Dallas Carroll (United States) Matt Kehoe (United States) Mark Smith	Porsche 4.0 L Flat-6	+11 Laps	83
34	**TCX**	**127**	**(Germany) SRS Team Sorg Rennsport**	**(Germany) Henning Eschweiler (Germany) Christoph Krombach (Germany) Heinz Jürgen Kroner (Mexico) Benito Tagle**	**Porsche 718 Cayman GT4 Clubsport**	**+11 Laps**	**83**
34	**TCX**	**127**	**(Germany) SRS Team Sorg Rennsport**	**(Germany) Henning Eschweiler (Germany) Christoph Krombach (Germany) Heinz Jürgen Kroner (Mexico) Benito Tagle**	**Porsche 3.8 L V6**	**+11 Laps**	**83**
35 DNF	GT4	438	(United Kingdom) Simpson Motorsport	(United Kingdom) Ravi Ramyead (United Kingdom) Charlie Robertson (Cyprus) Vasily Vladykin	BMW M4 GT4 Gen II	+13 Laps	81
35 DNF	GT4	438	(United Kingdom) Simpson Motorsport	(United Kingdom) Ravi Ramyead (United Kingdom) Charlie Robertson (Cyprus) Vasily Vladykin	BMW N55 3.0 L Twin-turbo I6	+13 Laps	81
36	TCX	178	(United Kingdom) CWS Engineering	(United Kingdom) Daniel Morris (United Kingdom) Colin White	Ginetta G55 Supercup	+14 Laps	80
36	TCX	178	(United Kingdom) CWS Engineering	(United Kingdom) Daniel Morris (United Kingdom) Colin White	Ford Cyclone 3.7 L V6	+14 Laps	80
37	GTX	701	(France) Vortex V8	(France) Lionel Amrouche (France) Philippe Bonnel (France) Gilles Courtois	Vortex 2.0	+15 Laps	79
37	GTX	701	(France) Vortex V8	(France) Lionel Amrouche (France) Philippe Bonnel (France) Gilles Courtois	Chevrolet 6.2 L V8	+15 Laps	79
38	TCX	169	(Belgium) HY Racing	(Belgium) "Brody" (Italy) Bruno Barbaro (Belgium) Jacques Derenne (France) Brice Pineau	Porsche Cayman GTS	+17 Laps	77
38	TCX	169	(Belgium) HY Racing	(Belgium) "Brody" (Italy) Bruno Barbaro (Belgium) Jacques Derenne (France) Brice Pineau	Porsche 3.8 L V6	+17 Laps	77
39	992 Am	985	(Austria) Neuhofer Rennsport	(Austria) Felix Neuhofer (Austria) Markus Neuhofer (Germany) Manuel Zlof	Porsche 992 GT3 Cup	+19 Laps	75
39	992 Am	985	(Austria) Neuhofer Rennsport	(Austria) Felix Neuhofer (Austria) Markus Neuhofer (Germany) Manuel Zlof	Porsche 4.0 L Flat-6	+19 Laps	75
40	GTX	795	(France) Team CMR	(United Kingdom) Michael Simpson (United Kingdom) Freddie Tomlinson (United Kingdom) Lawrence Tomlinson	Ginetta G56 Cup	+20 Laps	74
40	GTX	795	(France) Team CMR	(United Kingdom) Michael Simpson (United Kingdom) Freddie Tomlinson (United Kingdom) Lawrence Tomlinson	GM LS3 6.2 L V8	+20 Laps	74
41	GTX	702	(France) Vortex V8	(France) Arnaud Gomez (France) Olivier Gomez (France) Lucas Sugliano	Vortex 2.0	+20 Laps	74
41	GTX	702	(France) Vortex V8	(France) Arnaud Gomez (France) Olivier Gomez (France) Lucas Sugliano	Chevrolet 6.2 L V8	+20 Laps	74
42	992 Am	992	(Netherlands) NKPP Racing by Bas Koeten Racing	(Netherlands) Gijs Bessem (Netherlands) Harry Hilders	Porsche 992 GT3 Cup	+24 Laps	70
42	992 Am	992	(Netherlands) NKPP Racing by Bas Koeten Racing	(Netherlands) Gijs Bessem (Netherlands) Harry Hilders	Porsche 4.0 L Flat-6	+24 Laps	70
43 DNF	GT4	400	(Sweden) ALFAB Racing	(Sweden) Erik Behrens (Sweden) Daniel Roos	McLaren Artura GT4	+25 Laps	69
43 DNF	GT4	400	(Sweden) ALFAB Racing	(Sweden) Erik Behrens (Sweden) Daniel Roos	McLaren M630 3.0 L Turbo V6	+25 Laps	69
44 DNF	GT3 Am	5	(Switzerland) Kessel Racing	(United Kingdom) Andrew Gilbert (Switzerland) Nicolò Rosi (Spain) Fran Rueda (Netherlands) Fons Scheltema	Ferrari 296 GT3	+74 Laps	20
44 DNF	GT3 Am	5	(Switzerland) Kessel Racing	(United Kingdom) Andrew Gilbert (Switzerland) Nicolò Rosi (Spain) Fran Rueda (Netherlands) Fons Scheltema	Ferrari F163 3.0 L Twin-turbo V6	+74 Laps	20
45 DNS	992 Pro	909	(Netherlands) Red Camel-Jordans.nl	(Netherlands) Ivo Breukers (Netherlands) Luc Breukers (Netherlands) Rik Breukers (Switzerland) Fabian Danz	Porsche 992 GT3 Cup	+94 Laps	0
45 DNS	992 Pro	909	(Netherlands) Red Camel-Jordans.nl	(Netherlands) Ivo Breukers (Netherlands) Luc Breukers (Netherlands) Rik Breukers (Switzerland) Fabian Danz	Porsche 4.0 L Flat-6	+94 Laps	0

=== Part 2 ===
Class winners are in bold.

Pos	Class	No	Team	Drivers	Car	Time/Reason	Laps
Pos	Class	No	Team	Drivers	Engine	Time/Reason	Laps
1	**GT3 Am**	**85**	**(United States) CP Racing**	**(United States) Charles Espenlaub (United States) Joe Foster (United States) Shane Lewis (United States) Charles Putman**	**Mercedes-AMG GT3 Evo**	**7:00:08.372**	**224 - combined laps**
1	**GT3 Am**	**85**	**(United States) CP Racing**	**(United States) Charles Espenlaub (United States) Joe Foster (United States) Shane Lewis (United States) Charles Putman**	**Mercedes-AMG M159 6.2 L V8**	**7:00:08.372**	**224 - combined laps**
2	GT3 Am	1	(Antigua and Barbuda) HAAS RT	(Belgium) Xavier Knauf (Switzerland) Tim Müller (Belgium) Gregory Servais	Audi R8 LMS Evo II	+1 Lap	223
2	GT3 Am	1	(Antigua and Barbuda) HAAS RT	(Belgium) Xavier Knauf (Switzerland) Tim Müller (Belgium) Gregory Servais	Audi 5.2 L V10	+1 Lap	223
3	GT3 Am	80	(Germany) Car Collection Motorsport	(Hong Kong) Antares Au (Hong Kong) Jonathan Hui (Hong Kong) Kevin Tse	Porsche 911 GT3 R (992)	+1 Lap	223
3	GT3 Am	80	(Germany) Car Collection Motorsport	(Hong Kong) Antares Au (Hong Kong) Jonathan Hui (Hong Kong) Kevin Tse	Porsche M97/80 4.2 L Flat-6	+1 Lap	223
4	GT3 Am	91	(Germany) Herberth Motorsport	(Germany) Ralf Bohn (United States) Jason Hart (United States) Scott Noble	Porsche 911 GT3 R (992)	+1 Lap	223
4	GT3 Am	91	(Germany) Herberth Motorsport	(Germany) Ralf Bohn (United States) Jason Hart (United States) Scott Noble	Porsche M97/80 4.2 L Flat-6	+1 Lap	223
5	**GT3 Pro/Am**	**90**	**(Spain) E2P Racing**	**(Spain) Pablo Burguera (Portugal) Álvaro Parente (Spain) Antonio Sainero**	**Porsche 911 GT3 R (991.2)**	**+2 Laps**	**222**
5	**GT3 Pro/Am**	**90**	**(Spain) E2P Racing**	**(Spain) Pablo Burguera (Portugal) Álvaro Parente (Spain) Antonio Sainero**	**Porsche 4.0 L Flat-6**	**+2 Laps**	**222**
6	GT3 Pro/Am	18	(France) Saintéloc Junior Team	(Austria) Michael Doppelmayr (Germany) Elia Erhart (Switzerland) Ernst Inderbitzin (Germany) Pierre Kaffer	Audi R8 LMS Evo II	+2 Laps	222
6	GT3 Pro/Am	18	(France) Saintéloc Junior Team	(Austria) Michael Doppelmayr (Germany) Elia Erhart (Switzerland) Ernst Inderbitzin (Germany) Pierre Kaffer	Audi 5.2 L V10	+2 Laps	222
7	GT3 Pro/Am	71	(Lithuania) Juta Racing	(Lithuania) Arunas Geciauskas (Sweden) Lukas Sundahl (United Kingdom) Lars Viljoen	Audi R8 LMS Evo II	+2 Laps	222
7	GT3 Pro/Am	71	(Lithuania) Juta Racing	(Lithuania) Arunas Geciauskas (Sweden) Lukas Sundahl (United Kingdom) Lars Viljoen	Audi 5.2 L V10	+2 Laps	222
8	GT3 Am	34	(Germany) Land Motorsport	(Norway) Wiggo Dalmo (Germany) Max Edelhoff (Germany) Dr. Johannes Kirchhoff (Germany) Tim Vogler	Audi R8 LMS Evo II	+3 Laps	221
8	GT3 Am	34	(Germany) Land Motorsport	(Norway) Wiggo Dalmo (Germany) Max Edelhoff (Germany) Dr. Johannes Kirchhoff (Germany) Tim Vogler	Audi 5.2 L V10	+3 Laps	221
9	**992 Pro**	**903**	**(Belgium) Red Ant Racing**	**(Lithuania) Julius Adomavičius (Belgium) Ayrton Redant (Belgium) Yannick Redant**	**Porsche 992 GT3 Cup**	**+4 Laps**	**220**
9	**992 Pro**	**903**	**(Belgium) Red Ant Racing**	**(Lithuania) Julius Adomavičius (Belgium) Ayrton Redant (Belgium) Yannick Redant**	**Porsche 4.0 L Flat-6**	**+4 Laps**	**220**
10	992 Pro	904	(Belgium) Red Ant Racing	(Belgium) Peter Guelinckx (Belgium) Michiel Haverans (Belgium) Brent Verheyen	Porsche 992 GT3 Cup	+6 Laps	218
10	992 Pro	904	(Belgium) Red Ant Racing	(Belgium) Peter Guelinckx (Belgium) Michiel Haverans (Belgium) Brent Verheyen	Porsche 4.0 L Flat-6	+6 Laps	218
11	**992 Pro**	**993**	**(Lithuania) Porsche Baltic**	**(Lithuania) Robertas Kupcikas (Lithuania) Domas Raudonis (Lithuania) Tautvydas Rudokas**	**Porsche 992 GT3 Cup**	**+7 Laps**	**217**
11	**992 Pro**	**993**	**(Lithuania) Porsche Baltic**	**(Lithuania) Robertas Kupcikas (Lithuania) Domas Raudonis (Lithuania) Tautvydas Rudokas**	**Porsche 4.0 L Flat-6**	**+7 Laps**	**217**
12	992 Am	967	(Germany) HRT Performance	(Switzerland) Linus Diener (Germany) Kim André Hauschild (Italy) Amadeo Pampanini (Switzerland) Nicolas Stürzinger	Porsche 992 GT3 Cup	+7 Laps	217
12	992 Am	967	(Germany) HRT Performance	(Switzerland) Linus Diener (Germany) Kim André Hauschild (Italy) Amadeo Pampanini (Switzerland) Nicolas Stürzinger	Porsche 4.0 L Flat-6	+7 Laps	217
13	GT3 Am	11	(Switzerland) Hofor Racing	(Germany) Kenneth Heyer (Switzerland) Michael Kroll (Germany) Max Partl (Germany) Alexander Prinz (Switzerland) Chantal Prinz	Mercedes-AMG GT3	+7 Laps	217
13	GT3 Am	11	(Switzerland) Hofor Racing	(Germany) Kenneth Heyer (Switzerland) Michael Kroll (Germany) Max Partl (Germany) Alexander Prinz (Switzerland) Chantal Prinz	Mercedes-AMG M159 6.2 L V8	+7 Laps	217
14	992 Am	972	(Netherlands) Hans Weijs Motorsport	(Netherlands) Mark van Eldik (Netherlands) Paul Meijer (Netherlands) Ralph Poppelaars (Netherlands) Edwin Schilt	Porsche 992 GT3 Cup	+7 Laps	217
14	992 Am	972	(Netherlands) Hans Weijs Motorsport	(Netherlands) Mark van Eldik (Netherlands) Paul Meijer (Netherlands) Ralph Poppelaars (Netherlands) Edwin Schilt	Porsche 4.0 L Flat-6	+7 Laps	217
15	992 Am	907	(Germany) RPM Racing	(Germany) Philip Hamprecht (Sweden) Niclas Jönsson (United States) Tracy Krohn	Porsche 992 GT3 Cup	+8 Laps	216
15	992 Am	907	(Germany) RPM Racing	(Germany) Philip Hamprecht (Sweden) Niclas Jönsson (United States) Tracy Krohn	Porsche 4.0 L Flat-6	+8 Laps	216
16	992 Am	927	(Germany) SRS Team Sorg Rennsport	(Germany) Heiko Eichenberg (Switzerland) Patrik Grütter (Austria) Bernhard Wagner	Porsche 992 GT3 Cup	+9 Laps	215
16	992 Am	927	(Germany) SRS Team Sorg Rennsport	(Germany) Heiko Eichenberg (Switzerland) Patrik Grütter (Austria) Bernhard Wagner	Porsche 4.0 L Flat-6	+9 Laps	215
17	992 Am	925	(Netherlands) Bas Koeten Racing	(Netherlands) Marcel van Berlo (Netherlands) Bob Herber	Porsche 992 GT3 Cup	+10 Laps	214
17	992 Am	925	(Netherlands) Bas Koeten Racing	(Netherlands) Marcel van Berlo (Netherlands) Bob Herber	Porsche 4.0 L Flat-6	+10 Laps	214
18	GT3 Pro/Am	12	(Germany) Car Collection Motorsport	(United States) "Hash" (Switzerland) Alex Fontana (Switzerland) Ivan Jacoma (Switzerland) Yannick Mettler	Porsche 911 GT3 R (992)	+10 Laps	214
18	GT3 Pro/Am	12	(Germany) Car Collection Motorsport	(United States) "Hash" (Switzerland) Alex Fontana (Switzerland) Ivan Jacoma (Switzerland) Yannick Mettler	Porsche M97/80 4.2 L Flat-6	+10 Laps	214
19	992 Am	988	(Germany) MRS GT Racing	(Costa Rica) Amadeo Quiros (Estonia) Antti Rammo (El Salvador) Rolando Saca	Porsche 992 GT3 Cup	+10 Laps	214
19	992 Am	988	(Germany) MRS GT Racing	(Costa Rica) Amadeo Quiros (Estonia) Antti Rammo (El Salvador) Rolando Saca	Porsche 4.0 L Flat-6	+10 Laps	214
20	GT3 Am	58	(Italy) MP Racing	(Italy) Corinna Gostner (Italy) David Gostner (Italy) Manuela Gostner (Italy) Thomas Gostner	Mercedes-AMG GT3 Evo	+11 Laps	213
20	GT3 Am	58	(Italy) MP Racing	(Italy) Corinna Gostner (Italy) David Gostner (Italy) Manuela Gostner (Italy) Thomas Gostner	Mercedes-AMG M159 6.2 L V8	+11 Laps	213
21	992 Am	917	(Switzerland) Orchid Racing Team	(Switzerland) Daniel Gillioz (France) Laurent Misbach (Switzerland) Alexandre Mottet	Porsche 992 GT3 Cup	+12 Laps	212
21	992 Am	917	(Switzerland) Orchid Racing Team	(Switzerland) Daniel Gillioz (France) Laurent Misbach (Switzerland) Alexandre Mottet	Porsche 4.0 L Flat-6	+12 Laps	212
22	992 Am	979	(Belgium) Speedlover	(Belgium) Olivier Dons (Belgium) Wim Meulders (Belgium) Rik Renmans	Porsche 992 GT3 Cup	+13 Laps	211
22	992 Am	979	(Belgium) Speedlover	(Belgium) Olivier Dons (Belgium) Wim Meulders (Belgium) Rik Renmans	Porsche 4.0 L Flat-6	+13 Laps	211
23	**GT4**	**416**	**(United Arab Emirates) Buggyra ZM Racing**	**(Seychelles) Aliyyah Koloc (Czech Republic) Adam Lacko (Czech Republic) David Vrsecky**	**Mercedes-AMG GT4**	**+14 Laps**	**210**
23	**GT4**	**416**	**(United Arab Emirates) Buggyra ZM Racing**	**(Seychelles) Aliyyah Koloc (Czech Republic) Adam Lacko (Czech Republic) David Vrsecky**	**Mercedes-AMG M178 4.0 L V8**	**+14 Laps**	**210**
24	992 Am	908	(France) SebLajoux Racing by DUWO Racing	(France) Gilles Blasco (France) Jean-François Demorge (France) Philippe Polette (France) Benjamin Roy	Porsche 992 GT3 Cup	+15 Laps	209
24	992 Am	908	(France) SebLajoux Racing by DUWO Racing	(France) Gilles Blasco (France) Jean-François Demorge (France) Philippe Polette (France) Benjamin Roy	Porsche 4.0 L Flat-6	+15 Laps	209
25	GT4	424	(Germany) Lionspeed GP	(Germany) Dennis Bohn (United States) José Garcia (Germany) Patrick Kolb (United States) Daniel Miller	Porsche 718 Cayman GT4 RS Clubsport	+15 Laps	209
25	GT4	424	(Germany) Lionspeed GP	(Germany) Dennis Bohn (United States) José Garcia (Germany) Patrick Kolb (United States) Daniel Miller	Porsche 4.0 L Flat-6	+15 Laps	209
26	GT3 Am	44	(Slovakia) ARC Bratislava	(Slovakia) Anton Kiaba (Slovakia) Miro Konôpka (Italy) Mateo Llarena (Slovakia) Zdeno Mikulasko	Lamborghini Huracán GT3 Evo	+19 Laps	205
26	GT3 Am	44	(Slovakia) ARC Bratislava	(Slovakia) Anton Kiaba (Slovakia) Miro Konôpka (Italy) Mateo Llarena (Slovakia) Zdeno Mikulasko	Lamborghini DGF 5.2 L V10	+19 Laps	205
27	GT4	419	(Belgium) Hamofa Motorsport	(Belgium) Kris Verhoeven (Belgium) Mark Verhoeven (Belgium) Rob Verhoeven	BMW M4 GT4 Gen II	+19 Laps	205
27	GT4	419	(Belgium) Hamofa Motorsport	(Belgium) Kris Verhoeven (Belgium) Mark Verhoeven (Belgium) Rob Verhoeven	BMW N55 3.0 L Twin-turbo I6	+19 Laps	205
28	992 Am	969	(San Marino) GDL Racing	(United States) Dallas Carroll (United States) Matt Kehoe (United States) Mark Smith	Porsche 992 GT3 Cup	+25 Laps	199
28	992 Am	969	(San Marino) GDL Racing	(United States) Dallas Carroll (United States) Matt Kehoe (United States) Mark Smith	Porsche 4.0 L Flat-6	+25 Laps	199
29	992 Am	985	(Austria) Neuhofer Rennsport	(Austria) Felix Neuhofer (Austria) Markus Neuhofer (Germany) Manuel Zlof	Porsche 992 GT3 Cup	+25 Laps	199
29	992 Am	985	(Austria) Neuhofer Rennsport	(Austria) Felix Neuhofer (Austria) Markus Neuhofer (Germany) Manuel Zlof	Porsche 4.0 L Flat-6	+25 Laps	199
30	**TCX**	**178**	**(United Kingdom) CWS Engineering**	**(United Kingdom) Daniel Morris (United Kingdom) Colin White**	**Ginetta G55 Supercup**	**+26 Laps**	**198**
30	**TCX**	**178**	**(United Kingdom) CWS Engineering**	**(United Kingdom) Daniel Morris (United Kingdom) Colin White**	**Ford Cyclone 3.7 L V6**	**+26 Laps**	**198**
31	TCX	127	(Germany) SRS Team Sorg Rennsport	(Germany) Henning Eschweiler (Germany) Christoph Krombach (Germany) Heinz Jürgen Kroner (Mexico) Benito Tagle	Porsche 718 Cayman GT4 Clubsport	+29 Laps	195
31	TCX	127	(Germany) SRS Team Sorg Rennsport	(Germany) Henning Eschweiler (Germany) Christoph Krombach (Germany) Heinz Jürgen Kroner (Mexico) Benito Tagle	Porsche 3.8 L V6	+29 Laps	195
32	992 Am	992	(Netherlands) NKPP Racing by Bas Koeten Racing	(Netherlands) Gijs Bessem (Netherlands) Harry Hilders	Porsche 992 GT3 Cup	+30 Laps	194
32	992 Am	992	(Netherlands) NKPP Racing by Bas Koeten Racing	(Netherlands) Gijs Bessem (Netherlands) Harry Hilders	Porsche 4.0 L Flat-6	+30 Laps	194
33	**GTX**	**701**	**(France) Vortex V8**	**(France) Lionel Amrouche (France) Philippe Bonnel (France) Gilles Courtois**	**Vortex 2.0**	**+31 Laps**	**193**
33	**GTX**	**701**	**(France) Vortex V8**	**(France) Lionel Amrouche (France) Philippe Bonnel (France) Gilles Courtois**	**Chevrolet 6.2 L V8**	**+31 Laps**	**193**
34	992 Pro	902	(Denmark) Holmgaard Motorsport	(Denmark) Jonas Holmgaard (Denmark) Magnus Holmgaard (Germany) Marlon Menden (France) Stéphane Perrin (Denmark) Martin Vedel Mortensen	Porsche 992 GT3 Cup	+34 Laps	190
34	992 Pro	902	(Denmark) Holmgaard Motorsport	(Denmark) Jonas Holmgaard (Denmark) Magnus Holmgaard (Germany) Marlon Menden (France) Stéphane Perrin (Denmark) Martin Vedel Mortensen	Porsche 4.0 L Flat-6	+34 Laps	190
35 DNF	992 Am	911	(South Korea) Hankook Competition	(South Korea) Roelof Bruins (Canada) Steven Cho (Hong Kong) Dr. Ma	Porsche 992 GT3 Cup	+35 Laps	189
35 DNF	992 Am	911	(South Korea) Hankook Competition	(South Korea) Roelof Bruins (Canada) Steven Cho (Hong Kong) Dr. Ma	Porsche 4.0 L Flat-6	+35 Laps	189
36	GTX	702	(France) Vortex V8	(France) Arnaud Gomez (France) Olivier Gomez (France) Lucas Sugliano	Vortex 2.0	+37 Laps	187
36	GTX	702	(France) Vortex V8	(France) Arnaud Gomez (France) Olivier Gomez (France) Lucas Sugliano	Chevrolet 6.2 L V8	+37 Laps	187
37	GT4	400	(Sweden) ALFAB Racing	(Sweden) Erik Behrens (Sweden) Daniel Roos	McLaren Artura GT4	+37 Laps	187
37	GT4	400	(Sweden) ALFAB Racing	(Sweden) Erik Behrens (Sweden) Daniel Roos	McLaren M630 3.0 L Turbo V6	+37 Laps	187
38	GTX	719	(Germany) 9und11 Racing	(Germany) Georg Goder (Germany) Tim Scheerbarth (Germany) Martin Schlüter	Porsche 911 GT3 Cup II MR	+38 Laps	186
38	GTX	719	(Germany) 9und11 Racing	(Germany) Georg Goder (Germany) Tim Scheerbarth (Germany) Martin Schlüter	Porsche 4.0 L Flat-6	+38 Laps	186
39	TCX	169	(Belgium) HY Racing	(Belgium) "Brody" (Italy) Bruno Barbaro (Belgium) Jacques Derenne (France) Brice Pineau	Porsche Cayman GTS	+52 Laps	172
39	TCX	169	(Belgium) HY Racing	(Belgium) "Brody" (Italy) Bruno Barbaro (Belgium) Jacques Derenne (France) Brice Pineau	Porsche 3.8 L V6	+52 Laps	172
40	GT4	438	(United Kingdom) Simpson Motorsport	(United Kingdom) Ravi Ramyead (United Kingdom) Charlie Robertson (Cyprus) Vasily Vladykin	BMW M4 GT4 Gen II	+109 Laps	115
40	GT4	438	(United Kingdom) Simpson Motorsport	(United Kingdom) Ravi Ramyead (United Kingdom) Charlie Robertson (Cyprus) Vasily Vladykin	BMW N55 3.0 L Twin-turbo I6	+109 Laps	115
41 DNF	GTX	795	(France) Team CMR	(United Kingdom) Michael Simpson (United Kingdom) Freddie Tomlinson (United Kingdom) Lawrence Tomlinson	Ginetta G56 Cup	+108 Laps	116
41 DNF	GTX	795	(France) Team CMR	(United Kingdom) Michael Simpson (United Kingdom) Freddie Tomlinson (United Kingdom) Lawrence Tomlinson	GM LS3 6.2 L V8	+108 Laps	116
42 DNF	GT3 Pro/Am	69	(Lithuania) RD Signs - Siauliai racing team	(Lithuania) Audrius Butkevicius (Italy) Nicola Machelon; Paulius Paskevicius	Lamborghini Huracán GT3	+115 Laps	109
42 DNF	GT3 Pro/Am	69	(Lithuania) RD Signs - Siauliai racing team	(Lithuania) Audrius Butkevicius (Italy) Nicola Machelon; Paulius Paskevicius	Lamborghini DGF 5.2 L V10	+115 Laps	109
43 DNF	GT3 Pro/Am	84	(New Zealand) EBM	(Malaysia) Adrian D'Silva (Australia) Shae Davies (Estonia) Martin Rump	Porsche 911 GT3 R (992)	+131 Laps	93
43 DNF	GT3 Pro/Am	84	(New Zealand) EBM	(Malaysia) Adrian D'Silva (Australia) Shae Davies (Estonia) Martin Rump	Porsche M97/80 4.2 L Flat-6	+131 Laps	93
44 DNF	992 Pro	909	(Netherlands) Red Camel-Jordans.nl	(Netherlands) Ivo Breukers (Netherlands) Luc Breukers (Netherlands) Rik Breukers (Switzerland) Fabian Danz	Porsche 992 GT3 Cup	+219 Laps	5
44 DNF	992 Pro	909	(Netherlands) Red Camel-Jordans.nl	(Netherlands) Ivo Breukers (Netherlands) Luc Breukers (Netherlands) Rik Breukers (Switzerland) Fabian Danz	Porsche 4.0 L Flat-6	+219 Laps	5
45 DNS	GT3 Am	5	(Switzerland) Kessel Racing	(United Kingdom) Andrew Gilbert (Switzerland) Nicolò Rosi (Spain) Fran Rueda (Netherlands) Fons Scheltema	Ferrari 296 GT3	+204 Laps	Did not start race two
45 DNS	GT3 Am	5	(Switzerland) Kessel Racing	(United Kingdom) Andrew Gilbert (Switzerland) Nicolò Rosi (Spain) Fran Rueda (Netherlands) Fons Scheltema	Ferrari F163 3.0 L Twin-turbo V6	+204 Laps	Did not start race two

24H Series
Previous race: 12 Hours of Mugello	2024 season	Next race: 24 Hours of Portimão
