= 12 Hours of Spa-Francorchamps =

Sports car endurance race in Belgium

24H Series
- Venue: Circuit de Spa-Francorchamps
- First race: 2017
- Last race: 2026
- Duration: 12 hours
- Most wins (driver): (Czech Republic) Josef Král (Italy) Matteo Malucelli (Czech Republic) Jiří Písařík (2)
- Most wins (team): (Czech Republic) Bohemia Energy Racing with Scuderia Praha (2)
- Most wins (manufacturer): Ferrari; Audi (2)

The 12 Hours of Spa-Francorchamps is an endurance race for sports cars held at Circuit de Spa-Francorchamps in Stavelot, Wallonia, Belgium.

== History ==
The first race was announced as part of the 2017 24H TCE Series season calendar expansion. It remained on the TCE Series schedule until 2019. The race did not return to a Creventic series until the 2022 24H GT Series season.

== Results ==
Year	Overall winner(s)	Entrant	Car	Duration	Laps	Distance	Race title	Championship	Report
2017	(Finland) Antti Buri (Finland) Olli Kangas (Finland) Kari-Pekka Laaksonen	(Finland) LMS Racing powered by Bas Koeten	Seat Leon TCR V2 DSG	11:53:11.685	215	1,505.86 km	Hankook 12H Spa-Francorchamps	Touring Car Endurance Series	Report
2018	(Czech Republic) Josef Král (Italy) Matteo Malucelli (Czech Republic) Jiří Písařík	(Czech Republic) Bohemia Energy Racing with Scuderia Praha	Ferrari 488 GT3	12:01:37.433	237	1,659.95 km	Hankook 12H Spa-Francorchamps	24H GT Series; 24H TCE Series	Report
2019	(Czech Republic) Josef Král (Italy) Matteo Malucelli (Czech Republic) Jiří Písařík	(Czech Republic) Bohemia Energy Racing with Scuderia Praha	Ferrari 488 GT3	11:37:32.882	250	1,751.00 km	Hankook 12H SPA	24H GT Series; 24H TCE Series	Report
2020 – 2021	Not held								
2022	(Austria) Michael Doppelmayr (Germany) Elia Erhart (Germany) Pierre Kaffer (Poland) Patryk Krupinski	(Germany) Phoenix Racing	Audi R8 LMS Evo II	12:04:10.800	256	1,793.02 km	Hankook 12H Spa-Francorchamps	24H GT Series; 24H TCE Series	Report
2023	(France) Erwan Bastard (France) Paul Evrard (France) Antoine Doquin	(France) Saintéloc Junior Team	Audi R8 LMS Evo II	12:03:07.833	250	1,751.00 km	Hankook 12 Hours of Spa-Francorchamps	24H GT Series; 24H TCE Series	Report
2024	(United States) Charles Espenlaub (United States) Joe Foster (United States) Shane Lewis (United States) Charles Putman	(United States) CP Racing	Mercedes-AMG GT3 Evo	12:02:01.159	224	1,568.90 km	Hankook 12 Hours of Spa-Francorchamps	24H Series	Report
2025	(United Kingdom) Chris Froggatt (Netherlands) Loek Hartog (Hong Kong) Jonathan Hui	(Germany) Ziggo Sport - Tempesta Racing	Porsche 911 GT3 R (992)	12:03:21.567	269	1,884.08 km	Michelin 12 Hours of Spa-Francorchamps	24H Series	Report
2026	(United Kingdom) Harry George (Germany) Salman Owega (United Kingdom) Freddie Tomlinson	(United Kingdom) Optimum Motorsport	McLaren 720S GT3 Evo	12:00:47.237	254	1779.016 km	Michelin 12 Hours of Spa-Francorchamps	24H Series	Report
