= 2024 12 Hours of Mugello =

The layout of the Mugello Circuit, were the race was held.

The 2024 12 Hours of Mugello (formally known as the Hankook 12 Hours of Mugello) was an endurance sportscar racing held on 23 and 24 March 2024, in Tuscany, Italy, as the first of five rounds of the 2024 24H Series. It was the tenth running of the event, and the ninth running of the event as part of the 24H Series.

== Background ==
The event was announced on 16 October 2023 along with the rest of the 2024 24H Series calendar.

== Entry list ==
The entry list was revealed on 18 March 2024, and featured 36 cars: 14 GT3 cars, 16 Porsche 992 GT3 Cup cars, 2 GTX cars, and 4 GT4 cars.

No.	Entrant	Car	Class	Driver 1	Driver 2	Driver 3	Driver 4	Driver 5
GT3 (14 entries)
5	(Switzerland) Kessel Racing	Ferrari 488 GT3 Evo 2020	Am	(Switzerland) Alexandre Bochez	(Switzerland) Mickaël Bochez	(Turkey) Murat Cahadaroglu	(Italy) Felice Jelmini	
8	(Switzerland) Boem by Kessel Racing	Ferrari 296 GT3	PA	(Italy) Alessandro Cutrera	(Italy) Leonardo-Maria del Vecchio	(Italy) Marco Frezza	(Italy) David Fumanelli	(Italy) Marco Talarico
11	(Switzerland) Hofor Racing	Mercedes-AMG GT3	Am	(Germany) Kenneth Heyer	(Switzerland) Michael Kroll	(Germany) Max Partl	(Switzerland) Chantal Prinz	(Germany) Alexander Prinz
12	(Germany) Car Collection Motorsport	Porsche 911 GT3 R (992)	PA	(United States) "Hash"	(Switzerland) Alex Fontana	(Switzerland) Ivan Jacoma	(Germany) Yannick Mettler	
14	(Denmark) Poulsen Motorsport	BMW M4 GT3	Am	(Denmark) Christoffer Nygaard	(Denmark) Kristian Poulsen	(Denmark) Roland Poulsen		
27	(United States) Heart of Racing by SPS	Mercedes-AMG GT3 Evo	Am	(Canada) Roman De Angelis	(United States) Ian James	(United States) Gray Newell		
29	(Italy) Pellin Racing	Ferrari 488 GT3 Evo 2020	P	(United States) Lisa Clark	(Canada) Kyle Marcelli	(United States) Jeff Westphal		
32	(Netherlands) GP Elite	Porsche 911 GT3 R (992)	P	(Netherlands) Lucas Groeneveld	(Netherlands) Daan van Kuijk	(Netherlands) Jan van Kuijk	(Netherlands) Max van Splunteren	
58	(Italy) MP Racing	Mercedes-AMG GT3 Evo	Am	(Italy) Corinna Gostner	(Italy) David Gostner	(Italy) Manuela Gostner	(Italy) Thomas Gostner	
69	(Lithuania) RD Signs - Siauliai racing team	Lamborghini Huracán GT3 Evo	PA	(Lithuania) Audrius Butkevicius	(Italy) Nicola Michelon	(Lithuania) Paulius Paskevicius		
71	(Lithuania) Juta Racing	Audi R8 LMS GT3 Evo II	PA	(Australia) John Corbett	(Lithuania) Arunas Geciauskas	(United Kingdom) Casper Stevenson	(Sweden) Lukas Sundahl	
85	(United States) CP Racing	Mercedes-AMG GT3 Evo	Am	(United States) Charles Espenlaub	(United States) Joe Foster	(United States) Shane Lewis	(United States) Charles Putman	
90	(Spain) E2P Racing	Porsche 911 GT3 R (991.2)	PA	(Spain) Pablo Burguera	(Portugal) Álvaro Parente	(Spain) Antonio Sainero		
91	(Germany) Herberth Motorsport	Porsche 911 GT3 R (992)	Am	(Germany) Ralf Bohn	(United States) Jason Hart	(United States) Scott Noble		
GTX (2 entries)
701	(France) Vortex V8	Vortex 1.0		(France) Lionel Amrouche	(France) Philippe Bonnel	(France) Gilles Courtois	(France) Lucas Sugliano	
719	(Germany) 9und11 Racing	Porsche 991 GT3 Cup II MR		(Germany) Georg Goder	(Germany) Ralf Oehme	(Germany) Tim Scheerbarth	(Germany) Martin Schlüter	
992 (16 entries)
903	(Belgium) Red Ant Racing	Porsche 992 GT3 Cup	P	(Belgium) Kobe de Breucker	(Belgium) Ayrton Redant	(Belgium) Yannick Redant		
904	(Belgium) Red Ant Racing	Porsche 992 GT3 Cup	P	(Belgium) Peter Guelinckx	(Belgium) Michiel Haverans	(Belgium) Brent Verheyen		
907	(Germany) RPM Racing	Porsche 992 GT3 Cup	Am	(Germany) Philip Hamprecht	(Sweden) Niclas Jönsson	(United States) Tracy Krohn		
908	(France) SebLajoux Racing by DUWO Racing	Porsche 992 GT3 Cup	Am	(France) Gilles Blasco	(France) Jean-François Demorge	(France) Stéphane Perrin	(France) Philippe Polette	
909	(Netherlands) Red Camel-Jordans.nl	Porsche 992 GT3 Cup	P	(Netherlands) Luc Breukers	(Netherlands) Ivo Breukers	(Switzerland) Fabian Danz		
911	(South Korea) Hankook Competition	Porsche 992 GT3 Cup	Am	(South Korea) Roelof Bruins	(Canada) Steven Cho	(South Korea) Jongkyum Kim	(Hong Kong) Dr. Ma	
912	(Switzerland) Centri Porsche Ticino	Porsche 992 GT3 Cup	Am	(Italy) Max Busnelli	(Italy) Francesco Fenici	(Switzerland) Ivan Jacoma	(Switzerland) Valerio Presezzi	
917	(Switzerland) Orchid Racing Team	Porsche 992 GT3 Cup	Am	(Switzerland) Antonio Garzon	(Switzerland) Daniel Gillioz	(France) Laurène Godey	(Switzerland) Alexandre Mottet	(France) Frank Villiger
925	(Netherlands) Bas Koeten Racing	Porsche 992 GT3 Cup	Am	(Netherlands) Marcel van Berlo	(Netherlands) Bob Herber			
963	(Switzerland) Orchid Racing Team	Porsche 992 GT3 Cup	P	(France) Romain Dumas	(France) Sébastien Loeb	(France) Laurent Misbach	(Switzerland) Alexandre Mottet	(France) Loïc Villiger
967	(Germany) HRT Performance	Porsche 992 GT3 Cup	Am	(Switzerland) Linus Diener	(Italy) Amadeo Pampanini	(Switzerland) Nicolas Stürzinger		
973	(Italy) Ebimotors	Porsche 992 GT3 Cup	Am	(Italy) Paolo Gnemmi	(Italy) Gianluigi Piccioli	(Italy) Paolo Venerosi		
974	(Lithuania) Rimo Adero by Ebimotors	Porsche 992 GT3 Cup	Am	(Lithuania) Marius Bartkus	(Lithuania) Mantas Janavicius	(Lithuania) Aurelijus Rusteika	(Latvia) Valters Zviedris	
985	(Austria) Neuhofer Rennsport	Porsche 992 GT3 Cup	Am	Alexey Denisov	(Austria) Felix Neuhofer	(Austria) Markus Neuhofer	(Germany) Manuel Zlof	
992	(Netherlands) NKPP Racing by Bas Koeten Racing	Porsche 992 GT3 Cup	Am	(Netherlands) Gijs Bessem	(Netherlands) Harry Hilders			
993	(Lithuania) Porsche Baltic	Porsche 992 GT3 Cup	Am	(Lithuania) Eduardas Klepikas	(Lithuania) Robertas Kupcikas	(Lithuania) Domas Raudonis	(Lithuania) Tautvydas Rudokas	
GT4 (4 entries)
416	(United Arab Emirates) Buggyra ZM Racing	Mercedes-AMG GT4		(Seychelles) Aliyyah Koloc	(Czech Republic) Adam Lacko	(Czech Republic) David Vrsecky		
418	(Spain) PCR Sport	Mercedes-AMG GT4		(Spain) Harriet Arruabarrena	(Spain) Vincente Dasi	(Spain) Josep Parera		
424	(Germany) Lionspeed GP	Porsche 718 Cayman GT4 RS Clubsport		(United States) José Garcia	(Germany) Patrick Kolb	(United States) Daniel Miller		
431	(Switzerland) Hofor Racing by Bonk Motorsport	BMW M4 GT4 Gen II		(Switzerland) Martin Kroll	(Germany) Michael Mayer	(Germany) Rainer Partl		

GT3 entries
Icon	Class
P	GT3-Pro
PA	GT3-Pro Am
Am	GT3-Am
992 entries
Icon	Class
P	992-Pro
Am	992-Am

== Schedule ==
Date	Time (local: CEST)	Event	Duration
Friday, 22 March	11:45 - 13:15	Free Practice	90 Minutes
Friday, 22 March	14:30 - 15:25	Qualifying - TCE & GT4	3x15 Minutes
Friday, 22 March	15:35 - 16:30	Qualifying - GT3, GTX & 992	3x15 Minutes
Saturday, 23 March	12:30 - 19:00	Race - Part 1	6.5 Hours
Sunday, 24 March	9:00 - 14:30	Race - Part 2	5.5 Hours

== Practice ==
The first and only practice session started on 11:45 CEST on Friday. Felice Jelmini ended up quickest in GT3 in the No. 5 Kessel Racing Ferrari, lapping the circuit in a 1:48.887. Max van Splunteren was second-quickest.

Class	No.	Entrant	Driver	Time
GT3	5	(Switzerland) Kessel Racing	(Italy) Felice Jelmini	1:48.887
GTX	719	(Germany) 9und11 Racing	(Germany) Tim Scheerbarth	1:55.038
992	907	(Germany) RPM Racing	(Germany) Philip Hamprecht	1:53.272
GT4	416	(United Arab Emirates) Buggyra ZM Racing	(Czech Republic) David Vrsecky	2:00.065

- Note: Only the fastest car in each class is shown.

== Qualifying ==
Qualifying was split into three parts. The average of the best times per qualifying session determined the starting order.

=== GT3, GTX & 992 ===
Pole position winners in each class are marked in **bold**.

Pos.	Class	No.	Team	Q1	Q2	Q3	Avg
1	**GT3 Pro/Am**	**8**	(Switzerland) **Boem by Kessel Racing**	1:51.666	1:48.671	1:47.912	**1:49.416**
2	**GT3 Pro**	**32**	(Netherlands) **GP Elite**	1:47.937	1:50.153	1:50.423	**1:49.504**
3	GT3 Pro/Am	71	(Lithuania) Juta Racing	1:50.854	1:49.926	1:50.563	1:50.447
4	**GT3 Am**	**91**	(Germany) **Herberth Motorsport**	1:50.571	1:50.015	1:50.840	**1:50.475**
5	GT3 Pro/Am	12	(Germany) Car Collection Motorsport	1:51.834	1:50.010	1:50.730	1:50.858
6	GT3 Am	11	(Switzerland) Hofor Racing	1:49.574	1:51.445	1:52.792	1:51.270
7	GT3 Am	5	(Switzerland) Kessel Racing	1:53.636	1:52.271	1:48.405	1:51.437
8	GT3 Am	14	(Denmark) Poulsen Motorsport	1:52.894	1:49.890	1:51.870	1:51.551
9	GT3 Am	85	(United States) CP Racing	1:53.287	1:51.388	1:50.717	1:51.797
10	GT3 Pro	29	(Italy) Pellin Racing	1:59.119	1:48.232	1:48.508	1:51.953
11	GT3 Pro/Am	90	(Spain) E2P Racing	1:56.613	1:50.003	1:51.865	1:52.827
12	GT3 Pro/Am	69	(Lithuania) RD Signs - Siauliai racing team	1:54.613	1:53.437	1:51.429	1:53.159
13	**992 Pro**	**903**	(Belgium) **Red Ant Racing**	1:53.428	1:53.758	1:54.473	**1:53.886**
14	GT3 Am	58	(Italy) MP Racing	1:53.534	1:54.519	1:54.236	1:54.096
15	992 Pro	909	(Netherlands) Red Camel-Jordans.nl	1:54.821	1:54.346	1:54.483	1:54.550
16	**992 Am**	912	(Switzerland) Centri Porsche Ticino	1:54.470	1:54.288	1:55.680	**1:54.812**
17	992 Pro	963	(Switzerland) Orchid Racing Team	1:55.532	1:54.253	1:55.040	1:54.941
18	992 Pro	904	(Belgium) Red Ant Racing	1:55.243	1:55.572	1:55.436	1:55.417
19	992 Am	974	(Lithuania) Rimo Adero by Ebimotors	1:54.409	1:53.615	1:58.971	1:55.665
20	992 Am	993	(Lithuania) Porsche Baltic	1:55.950	1:54.836	1:56.569	1:55.785
21	992 Am	967	(Germany) HRT Performance	1:55.490	1:55.087	1:56.983	1:55.853
22	992 Am	925	(Netherlands) Bas Koeten Racing	1:54.701	1:55.292	1:58.769	1:56.254
23	992 Am	992	(Netherlands) NKPP Racing by Bas Koeten Racing	1:56.051	1:56.311	1:56.912	1:56.424
24	992 Am	985	(Austria) Neuhofer Rennsport	1:57.061	1:58.429	1:54.576	1:56.688
25	992 Am	911	(South Korea) Hankook Competition	2:00.651	1:54.468	1:55.293	1:56.804
26	992 Am	973	(Italy) Ebimotors	1:53.869	1:57.441	1:59.252	1:56.854
27	992 Am	907	(Germany) RPM Racing	1:53.723	2:03.182	1:53.867	1:56.924
28	**GTX**	**719**	(Germany) **9und11 Racing**	1:58.960	1:58.816	1:53.690	**1:57.155**
29	GTX	701	(France) Vortex V8	1:55.672	2:01.948	1:55.514	1:57.711
30	992 Am	917	(Switzerland) Orchid Racing Team	1:56.430	1:59.460	2:00.977	1:58.955
31	992 Am	908	(France) SebLajoux Racing by DUWO Racing	No time	2:04.135	1:56.689	2:00.412
	GT3 Am	27	(United States) Heart of Racing by SPS	No time	No time	No time	No time

=== TCE & GT4 ===
Pole position winners in each class are marked in **bold**.

Pos.	Class	No.	Team	Q1	Q2	Q3	Avg
1	**GT4**	**416**	(United Arab Emirates) **Buggyra ZM Racing**	1:59.353	2:01.088	2:01.673	**2:00.704**
2	GT4	424	(Germany) Lionspeed GP	2:01.214	2:01.632	2:00.863	2:01.236
3	GT4	431	(Switzerland) Hofor Racing by Bonk Motorsport	2:00.681	2:02.005	2:06.184	2:02.956
4	GT4	418	(Spain) PCR Sport	2:07.279	2:04.481	2:03.582	2:05.114

== Race ==
=== Part 1 ===
Class winners are in bold.

Pos	Class	No.	Team	Drivers	Car	Time/Reason	Laps
Pos	Class	No.	Team	Drivers	Engine	Time/Reason	Laps
1	**GT3 Pro**	**32**	**(Netherlands) GP Elite**	**(Netherlands) Lucas Groeneveld (Netherlands) Daan van Kuijk (Netherlands) Jan van Kuijk (Netherlands) Max van Splunteren**	**Porsche 911 GT3 R (992)**	**6:34:06.170**	**185**
1	**GT3 Pro**	**32**	**(Netherlands) GP Elite**	**(Netherlands) Lucas Groeneveld (Netherlands) Daan van Kuijk (Netherlands) Jan van Kuijk (Netherlands) Max van Splunteren**	**Porsche M97/80 4.2 L Flat-6**	**6:34:06.170**	**185**
2	**GT3 Am**	**91**	**(Germany) Herberth Motorsport**	**(Germany) Ralf Bohn (United States) Jason Hart (United States) Scott Noble**	**Porsche 911 GT3 R (992)**	**+1:33.367**	**185**
2	**GT3 Am**	**91**	**(Germany) Herberth Motorsport**	**(Germany) Ralf Bohn (United States) Jason Hart (United States) Scott Noble**	**Porsche M97/80 4.2 L Flat-6**	**+1:33.367**	**185**
3	GT3 Am	27	(United States) Heart of Racing by SPS	(Canada) Roman De Angelis (United States) Ian James (United States) Gray Newell	Mercedes-AMG GT3 Evo	+1 Lap	184
3	GT3 Am	27	(United States) Heart of Racing by SPS	(Canada) Roman De Angelis (United States) Ian James (United States) Gray Newell	Mercedes-AMG M159 6.2 L V8	+1 Lap	184
4	GT3 Am	85	(United States) CP Racing	(United States) Charles Espenlaub (United States) Joe Foster (United States) Shane Lewis (United States) Charles Putman	Mercedes-AMG GT3 Evo	+1 Lap	184
4	GT3 Am	85	(United States) CP Racing	(United States) Charles Espenlaub (United States) Joe Foster (United States) Shane Lewis (United States) Charles Putman	Mercedes-AMG M159 6.2 L V8	+1 Lap	184
5	GT3 Am	14	(Denmark) Poulsen Motorsport	(Denmark) Christoffer Nygaard (Denmark) Kristian Poulsen (Denmark) Roland Poulsen	BMW M4 GT3	+2 Laps	183
5	GT3 Am	14	(Denmark) Poulsen Motorsport	(Denmark) Christoffer Nygaard (Denmark) Kristian Poulsen (Denmark) Roland Poulsen	BMW S58B30T0 3.0 L Turbo I6	+2 Laps	183
6	**GT3 Pro/Am**	**8**	**(Switzerland) Boem by Kessel Racing**	**(Italy) Alessandro Cutrera (Italy) Leonardo-Maria del Vecchio (Italy) Marco Frezza (Italy) David Fumanelli (Italy) Marco Talarico**	**Ferrari 296 GT3**	**+2 Laps**	**183**
6	**GT3 Pro/Am**	**8**	**(Switzerland) Boem by Kessel Racing**	**(Italy) Alessandro Cutrera (Italy) Leonardo-Maria del Vecchio (Italy) Marco Frezza (Italy) David Fumanelli (Italy) Marco Talarico**	**Ferrari F163 3.0 L Twin-turbo V6**	**+2 Laps**	**183**
7	**992 Pro**	**903**	**(Belgium) Red Ant Racing**	**(Belgium) Kobe de Breucker (Belgium) Ayrton Redant (Belgium) Yannick Redant**	**Porsche 992 GT3 Cup**	**+4 Laps**	**181**
7	**992 Pro**	**903**	**(Belgium) Red Ant Racing**	**(Belgium) Kobe de Breucker (Belgium) Ayrton Redant (Belgium) Yannick Redant**	**Porsche 4.0 L Flat-6**	**+4 Laps**	**181**
8	GT3 Pro/Am	90	(Spain) E2P Racing	(Spain) Pablo Burguera (Portugal) Álvaro Parente (Spain) Antonio Sainero	Porsche 911 GT3 R (991.2)	+5 Laps	180
8	GT3 Pro/Am	90	(Spain) E2P Racing	(Spain) Pablo Burguera (Portugal) Álvaro Parente (Spain) Antonio Sainero	Porsche 4.0 L Flat-6	+5 Laps	180
9	GT3 Am	58	(Italy) MP Racing	(Italy) Corinna Gostner (Italy) David Gostner (Italy) Manuela Gostner (Italy) Thomas Gostner	Mercedes-AMG GT3 Evo	+5 Laps	180
9	GT3 Am	58	(Italy) MP Racing	(Italy) Corinna Gostner (Italy) David Gostner (Italy) Manuela Gostner (Italy) Thomas Gostner	Mercedes-AMG M159 6.2 L V8	+5 Laps	180
10	GT3 Pro/Am	71	(Lithuania) Juta Racing	(Australia) John Corbett (Lithuania) Arunas Geciauskas (United Kingdom) Casper Stevenson (Sweden) Lukas Sundahl	Audi R8 LMS GT3 Evo II	+6 Laps	179
10	GT3 Pro/Am	71	(Lithuania) Juta Racing	(Australia) John Corbett (Lithuania) Arunas Geciauskas (United Kingdom) Casper Stevenson (Sweden) Lukas Sundahl	Audi 5.2 L V10	+6 Laps	179
11	992 Pro	904	(Belgium) Red Ant Racing	(Belgium) Peter Guelinckx (Belgium) Michiel Haverans (Belgium) Brent Verheyen	Porsche 992 GT3 Cup	+7 Laps	178
11	992 Pro	904	(Belgium) Red Ant Racing	(Belgium) Peter Guelinckx (Belgium) Michiel Haverans (Belgium) Brent Verheyen	Porsche 4.0 L Flat-6	+7 Laps	178
12	GT3 Pro	29	(Italy) Pellin Racing	(United States) Lisa Clark (Canada) Kyle Marcelli (United States) Jeff Westphal	Ferrari 488 GT3 Evo 2020	+7 Laps	178
12	GT3 Pro	29	(Italy) Pellin Racing	(United States) Lisa Clark (Canada) Kyle Marcelli (United States) Jeff Westphal	Ferrari F154CB 3.9 L Turbo V8	+7 Laps	178
13	992 Pro	963	(Switzerland) Orchid Racing Team	(France) Romain Dumas (France) Sébastien Loeb (France) Laurent Misbach (Switzerland) Alexandre Mottet (France) Loïc Villiger	Porsche 992 GT3 Cup	+7 Laps	178
13	992 Pro	963	(Switzerland) Orchid Racing Team	(France) Romain Dumas (France) Sébastien Loeb (France) Laurent Misbach (Switzerland) Alexandre Mottet (France) Loïc Villiger	Porsche 4.0 L Flat-6	+7 Laps	178
14	**992 Am**	**992**	**(Netherlands) NKPP Racing by Bas Koeten Racing**	**(Netherlands) Gijs Bessem (Netherlands) Harry Hilders**	**Porsche 992 GT3 Cup**	**+7 Laps**	**178**
14	**992 Am**	**992**	**(Netherlands) NKPP Racing by Bas Koeten Racing**	**(Netherlands) Gijs Bessem (Netherlands) Harry Hilders**	**Porsche 4.0 L Flat-6**	**+7 Laps**	**178**
15	992 Am	912	(Switzerland) Centri Porsche Ticino	(Italy) Max Busnelli (Italy) Francesco Fenici (Switzerland) Ivan Jacoma (Switzerland) Valerio Presezzi	Porsche 992 GT3 Cup	+7 Laps	178
15	992 Am	912	(Switzerland) Centri Porsche Ticino	(Italy) Max Busnelli (Italy) Francesco Fenici (Switzerland) Ivan Jacoma (Switzerland) Valerio Presezzi	Porsche 4.0 L Flat-6	+7 Laps	178
16	992 Am	967	(Germany) HRT Performance	(Switzerland) Linus Diener (Italy) Amadeo Pampanini (Switzerland) Nicolas Stürzinger	Porsche 992 GT3 Cup	+7 Laps	178
16	992 Am	967	(Germany) HRT Performance	(Switzerland) Linus Diener (Italy) Amadeo Pampanini (Switzerland) Nicolas Stürzinger	Porsche 4.0 L Flat-6	+7 Laps	178
17	992 Am	974	(Lithuania) Rimo Adero by Ebimotors	(Lithuania) Marius Bartkus (Lithuania) Mantas Janavicius (Lithuania) Aurelijus Rusteika (Latvia) Valters Zviedris	Porsche 992 GT3 Cup	+8 Laps	177
17	992 Am	974	(Lithuania) Rimo Adero by Ebimotors	(Lithuania) Marius Bartkus (Lithuania) Mantas Janavicius (Lithuania) Aurelijus Rusteika (Latvia) Valters Zviedris	Porsche 4.0 L Flat-6	+8 Laps	177
18	992 Am	925	(Netherlands) Bas Koeten Racing	(Netherlands) Marcel van Berlo (Netherlands) Bob Herber	Porsche 992 GT3 Cup	+9 Laps	176
18	992 Am	925	(Netherlands) Bas Koeten Racing	(Netherlands) Marcel van Berlo (Netherlands) Bob Herber	Porsche 4.0 L Flat-6	+9 Laps	176
19	**GTX**	**719**	**(Germany) 9und11 Racing**	**(Germany) Georg Goder (Germany) Ralf Oehme (Germany) Tim Scheerbarth (Germany) Martin Schlüter**	**Porsche 991 GT3 Cup II MR**	**+9 Laps**	**176**
19	**GTX**	**719**	**(Germany) 9und11 Racing**	**(Germany) Georg Goder (Germany) Ralf Oehme (Germany) Tim Scheerbarth (Germany) Martin Schlüter**	**Porsche 4.0 L Flat-6**	**+9 Laps**	**176**
20	992 Am	973	(Italy) Ebimotors	(Italy) Paolo Gnemmi (Italy) Gianluigi Piccioli (Italy) Paolo Venerosi	Porsche 992 GT3 Cup	+9 Laps	176
20	992 Am	973	(Italy) Ebimotors	(Italy) Paolo Gnemmi (Italy) Gianluigi Piccioli (Italy) Paolo Venerosi	Porsche 4.0 L Flat-6	+9 Laps	176
21	992 Am	911	(South Korea) Hankook Competition	(South Korea) Roelof Bruins (Canada) Steven Cho (South Korea) Jongkyum Kim (Hong Kong) Dr. Ma	Porsche 992 GT3 Cup	+11 Laps	174
21	992 Am	911	(South Korea) Hankook Competition	(South Korea) Roelof Bruins (Canada) Steven Cho (South Korea) Jongkyum Kim (Hong Kong) Dr. Ma	Porsche 4.0 L Flat-6	+11 Laps	174
22 DNF	992 Am	985	(Austria) Neuhofer Rennsport	Alexey Denisov (Austria) Felix Neuhofer (Austria) Markus Neuhofer (Germany) Manuel Zlof	Porsche 992 GT3 Cup	+12 Laps	173
22 DNF	992 Am	985	(Austria) Neuhofer Rennsport	Alexey Denisov (Austria) Felix Neuhofer (Austria) Markus Neuhofer (Germany) Manuel Zlof	Porsche 4.0 L Flat-6	+12 Laps	173
23	992 Am	917	(Switzerland) Orchid Racing Team	(Switzerland) Antonio Garzon (Switzerland) Daniel Gillioz (France) Laurène Godey (Switzerland) Alexandre Mottet (France) Frank Villiger	Porsche 992 GT3 Cup	+14 Laps	171
23	992 Am	917	(Switzerland) Orchid Racing Team	(Switzerland) Antonio Garzon (Switzerland) Daniel Gillioz (France) Laurène Godey (Switzerland) Alexandre Mottet (France) Frank Villiger	Porsche 4.0 L Flat-6	+14 Laps	171
24	GT3 Pro/Am	12	(Germany) Car Collection Motorsport	(United States) "Hash" (Switzerland) Alex Fontana (Switzerland) Ivan Jacoma (Germany) Yannick Mettler	Porsche 911 GT3 R (992)	+15 Laps	170
24	GT3 Pro/Am	12	(Germany) Car Collection Motorsport	(United States) "Hash" (Switzerland) Alex Fontana (Switzerland) Ivan Jacoma (Germany) Yannick Mettler	Porsche M97/80 4.2 L Flat-6	+15 Laps	170
25	**GT4**	**431**	**(Switzerland) Hofor Racing by Bonk Motorsport**	**(Switzerland) Martin Kroll (Germany) Michael Mayer (Germany) Rainer Partl**	**BMW M4 GT4 Gen II**	**+17 Laps**	**168**
25	**GT4**	**431**	**(Switzerland) Hofor Racing by Bonk Motorsport**	**(Switzerland) Martin Kroll (Germany) Michael Mayer (Germany) Rainer Partl**	**BMW N55 3.0 L Twin-turbo I6**	**+17 Laps**	**168**
26	GT4	424	(Germany) Lionspeed GP	(United States) José Garcia (Germany) Patrick Kolb (United States) Daniel Miller	Porsche 718 Cayman GT4 RS Clubsport	+19 Laps	166
26	GT4	424	(Germany) Lionspeed GP	(United States) José Garcia (Germany) Patrick Kolb (United States) Daniel Miller	Porsche 4.0 L Flat-6	+19 Laps	166
27	992 Am	908	(France) SebLajoux Racing by DUWO Racing	(France) Gilles Blasco (France) Jean-François Demorge (France) Stéphane Perrin (France) Philippe Polette	Porsche 992 GT3 Cup	+28 Laps	157
27	992 Am	908	(France) SebLajoux Racing by DUWO Racing	(France) Gilles Blasco (France) Jean-François Demorge (France) Stéphane Perrin (France) Philippe Polette	Porsche 4.0 L Flat-6	+28 Laps	157
28 DNF	992 Am	907	(Germany) RPM Racing	(Germany) Philip Hamprecht (Sweden) Niclas Jönsson (United States) Tracy Krohn	Porsche 992 GT3 Cup	+33 Laps	152
28 DNF	992 Am	907	(Germany) RPM Racing	(Germany) Philip Hamprecht (Sweden) Niclas Jönsson (United States) Tracy Krohn	Porsche 4.0 L Flat-6	+33 Laps	152
29	GT4	416	(United Arab Emirates) Buggyra ZM Racing	(Seychelles) Aliyyah Koloc (Czech Republic) Adam Lacko (Czech Republic) David Vrsecky	Mercedes-AMG GT4	+36 Laps	149
29	GT4	416	(United Arab Emirates) Buggyra ZM Racing	(Seychelles) Aliyyah Koloc (Czech Republic) Adam Lacko (Czech Republic) David Vrsecky	Mercedes-AMG M178 4.0 L V8	+36 Laps	149
30	GT3 Am	5	(Switzerland) Kessel Racing	(Switzerland) Alexandre Bochez (Switzerland) Mickaël Bochez (Turkey) Murat Cahadaroglu (Italy) Felice Jelmini	Ferrari 488 GT3 Evo 2020	+39 Laps	146
30	GT3 Am	5	(Switzerland) Kessel Racing	(Switzerland) Alexandre Bochez (Switzerland) Mickaël Bochez (Turkey) Murat Cahadaroglu (Italy) Felice Jelmini	Ferrari F154CB 3.9 L Turbo V8	+39 Laps	146
31	GT3 Am	11	(Switzerland) Hofor Racing	(Germany) Kenneth Hayer (Switzerland) Michael Kroll (Germany) Max Partl (Switzerland) Chantal Prinz (Germany) Alexander Prinz	Mercedes-AMG GT3	+64 Laps	121
31	GT3 Am	11	(Switzerland) Hofor Racing	(Germany) Kenneth Hayer (Switzerland) Michael Kroll (Germany) Max Partl (Switzerland) Chantal Prinz (Germany) Alexander Prinz	Mercedes-AMG M159 6.2 L V8	+64 Laps	121
32	GTX	701	(France) Vortex V8	(France) Lionel Amrouche (France) Philippe Bonnel (France) Gilles Courtois (France) Lucas Sugliano	Vortex 1.0	+66 Laps	119
32	GTX	701	(France) Vortex V8	(France) Lionel Amrouche (France) Philippe Bonnel (France) Gilles Courtois (France) Lucas Sugliano	Chevrolet 6.2 L V8	+66 Laps	119
33	GT3 Pro/Am	69	(Lithuania) RD Signs - Siauliai racing team	(Lithuania) Audrius Butkevicius (Italy) Nicola Machelon (Lithuania) Paulius Paskevicius	Lamborghini Huracán GT3 Evo	+69 Laps	116
33	GT3 Pro/Am	69	(Lithuania) RD Signs - Siauliai racing team	(Lithuania) Audrius Butkevicius (Italy) Nicola Machelon (Lithuania) Paulius Paskevicius	Lamborghini DGF 5.2 L V10	+69 Laps	116
34 DNF	GT4	418	(Spain) PCR Sport	(Spain) Harriet Arruabarrena (Spain) Vincente Dasi (Spain) Josep Parera	Mercedes-AMG GT4	+84 Laps	101
34 DNF	GT4	418	(Spain) PCR Sport	(Spain) Harriet Arruabarrena (Spain) Vincente Dasi (Spain) Josep Parera	Mercedes-AMG M178 4.0 L V8	+84 Laps	101
35 DNF	992 Pro	909	(Netherlands) Red Camel-Jordans.nl	(Netherlands) Ivo Breukers (Netherlands) Luc Breukers (Switzerland) Fabian Danz	Porsche 992 GT3 Cup	+172 Laps	13
35 DNF	992 Pro	909	(Netherlands) Red Camel-Jordans.nl	(Netherlands) Ivo Breukers (Netherlands) Luc Breukers (Switzerland) Fabian Danz	Porsche 4.0 L Flat-6	+172 Laps	13
36 DNF	992 Am	993	(Lithuania) Porsche Baltic	(Lithuania) Eduardas Klepikas (Lithuania) Robertas Kupcikas (Lithuania) Domas Raudonis (Lithuania) Tautvydas Rudokas	Porsche 992 GT3 Cup	+185 Laps	0
36 DNF	992 Am	993	(Lithuania) Porsche Baltic	(Lithuania) Eduardas Klepikas (Lithuania) Robertas Kupcikas (Lithuania) Domas Raudonis (Lithuania) Tautvydas Rudokas	Porsche 4.0 L Flat-6	+185 Laps	0

=== Part 2 ===
Class winners are in bold.

Pos	Class	No	Team	Drivers	Car	Time/Reason	Laps
Pos	Class	No	Team	Drivers	Engine	Time/Reason	Laps
1	**GT3 Pro**	**32**	**(Netherlands) GP Elite**	**(Netherlands) Lucas Groeneveld (Netherlands) Daan van Kuijk (Netherlands) Jan van Kuijk (Netherlands) Max van Splunteren**	**Porsche 911 GT3 R (992)**	**5:31:35.030**	**327 - combined laps**
1	**GT3 Pro**	**32**	**(Netherlands) GP Elite**	**(Netherlands) Lucas Groeneveld (Netherlands) Daan van Kuijk (Netherlands) Jan van Kuijk (Netherlands) Max van Splunteren**	**Porsche M97/80 4.2 L Flat-6**	**5:31:35.030**	**327 - combined laps**
2	**GT3 Am**	**91**	**(Germany) Herberth Motorsport**	**(Germany) Ralf Bohn (United States) Jason Hart (United States) Scott Noble**	**Porsche 911 GT3 R (992)**	**+2 Laps**	**325**
2	**GT3 Am**	**91**	**(Germany) Herberth Motorsport**	**(Germany) Ralf Bohn (United States) Jason Hart (United States) Scott Noble**	**Porsche M97/80 4.2 L Flat-6**	**+2 Laps**	**325**
3	GT3 Am	85	(United States) CP Racing	(United States) Charles Espenlaub (United States) Joe Foster (United States) Shane Lewis (United States) Charles Putman	Mercedes-AMG GT3 Evo	+4 Laps	323
3	GT3 Am	85	(United States) CP Racing	(United States) Charles Espenlaub (United States) Joe Foster (United States) Shane Lewis (United States) Charles Putman	Mercedes-AMG M159 6.2 L V8	+4 Laps	323
4	GT3 Am	14	(Denmark) Poulsen Motorsport	(Denmark) Christoffer Nygaard (Denmark) Kristian Poulsen (Denmark) Roland Poulsen	BMW M4 GT3	+6 Laps	321
4	GT3 Am	14	(Denmark) Poulsen Motorsport	(Denmark) Christoffer Nygaard (Denmark) Kristian Poulsen (Denmark) Roland Poulsen	BMW S58B30T0 3.0 L Turbo I6	+6 Laps	321
5	**GT3 Pro/Am**	**8**	**(Switzerland) Boem by Kessel Racing**	**(Italy) Alessandro Cutrera (Italy) Marco Frezza (Italy) David Fumanelli (Italy) Marco Talarico (Italy) Leonardo-Maria del Vecchio**	**Ferrari 296 GT3**	**+7 Laps**	**320**
5	**GT3 Pro/Am**	**8**	**(Switzerland) Boem by Kessel Racing**	**(Italy) Alessandro Cutrera (Italy) Marco Frezza (Italy) David Fumanelli (Italy) Marco Talarico (Italy) Leonardo-Maria del Vecchio**	**Ferrari F163 3.0 L Twin-turbo V6**	**+7 Laps**	**320**
6	**992 Pro**	**903**	**(Belgium) Red Ant Racing**	**(Belgium) Kobe de Breucker (Belgium) Ayrton Redant (Belgium) Yannick Redant**	**Porsche 992 GT3 Cup**	**+9 Laps**	**318**
6	**992 Pro**	**903**	**(Belgium) Red Ant Racing**	**(Belgium) Kobe de Breucker (Belgium) Ayrton Redant (Belgium) Yannick Redant**	**Porsche 4.0 L Flat-6**	**+9 Laps**	**318**
7	GT3 Pro/Am	71	(Lithuania) Juta Racing	(Australia) John Corbett (Lithuania) Arunas Geciauskas (United Kingdom) Casper Stevenson (Sweden) Lukas Sundahl	Audi R8 LMS Evo II	+9 Laps	318
7	GT3 Pro/Am	71	(Lithuania) Juta Racing	(Australia) John Corbett (Lithuania) Arunas Geciauskas (United Kingdom) Casper Stevenson (Sweden) Lukas Sundahl	Audi 5.2 L V10	+9 Laps	318
8	GT3 Am	27	(United States) Heart of Racing by SPS	(Canada) Roman De Angelis (United States) Ian James (United States) Gray Newell	Mercedes-AMG GT3 Evo	+10 Laps	317
8	GT3 Am	27	(United States) Heart of Racing by SPS	(Canada) Roman De Angelis (United States) Ian James (United States) Gray Newell	Mercedes-AMG M159 6.2 L V8	+10 Laps	317
9	992 Pro	963	(Switzerland) Orchid Racing Team	(France) Romain Dumas (France) Sébastien Loeb (France) Laurent Misbach (Switzerland) Alexandre Mottet (France) Loïc Villiger	Porsche 992 GT3 Cup	+12 Laps	315
9	992 Pro	963	(Switzerland) Orchid Racing Team	(France) Romain Dumas (France) Sébastien Loeb (France) Laurent Misbach (Switzerland) Alexandre Mottet (France) Loïc Villiger	Porsche 4.0 L Flat-6	+12 Laps	315
10	**992 Am**	**912**	**(Switzerland) Centri Porsche Ticino**	**(Italy) Max Busnelli (Italy) Francesco Fenici (Switzerland) Ivan Jacoma (Switzerland) Valerio Presezzi**	**Porsche 992 GT3 Cup**	**+12 Laps**	**315**
10	**992 Am**	**912**	**(Switzerland) Centri Porsche Ticino**	**(Italy) Max Busnelli (Italy) Francesco Fenici (Switzerland) Ivan Jacoma (Switzerland) Valerio Presezzi**	**Porsche 4.0 L Flat-6**	**+12 Laps**	**315**
11	992 Am	974	(Lithuania) Rimo Adero by Ebimotors	(Lithuania) Marius Bartkus (Lithuania) Mantas Janavicius (Lithuania) Aurelijus Rusteika (Latvia) Valters Zviedris	Porsche 992 GT3 Cup	+12 Laps	315
11	992 Am	974	(Lithuania) Rimo Adero by Ebimotors	(Lithuania) Marius Bartkus (Lithuania) Mantas Janavicius (Lithuania) Aurelijus Rusteika (Latvia) Valters Zviedris	Porsche 4.0 L Flat-6	+12 Laps	315
12	992 Am	992	(Netherlands) NKPP Racing by Bas Koeten Racing	(Netherlands) Gijs Bessem (Netherlands) Harry Hilders	Porsche 992 GT3 Cup	+16 Laps	311
12	992 Am	992	(Netherlands) NKPP Racing by Bas Koeten Racing	(Netherlands) Gijs Bessem (Netherlands) Harry Hilders	Porsche 4.0 L Flat-6	+16 Laps	311
13	992 Am	973	(Italy) Ebimotors	(Italy) Paolo Gnemmi (Italy) Gianluigi Piccioli (Italy) Paolo Venerosi	Porsche 992 GT3 Cup	+17 Laps	310
13	992 Am	973	(Italy) Ebimotors	(Italy) Paolo Gnemmi (Italy) Gianluigi Piccioli (Italy) Paolo Venerosi	Porsche 4.0 L Flat-6	+17 Laps	310
14	992 Am	967	(Germany) HRT Performance	(Switzerland) Linus Diener (Italy) Amadeo Pampanini (Switzerland) Nicolas Stürzinger	Porsche 992 GT3 Cup	+17 Laps	310
14	992 Am	967	(Germany) HRT Performance	(Switzerland) Linus Diener (Italy) Amadeo Pampanini (Switzerland) Nicolas Stürzinger	Porsche 4.0 L Flat-6	+17 Laps	310
15 DNF	GT3 Pro/Am	90	(Spain) E2P Racing	(Spain) Pablo Burguera (Portugal) Álvaro Parente (Spain) Antonio Sainero	Porsche 911 GT3 R (991.2)	+18 Laps	309
15 DNF	GT3 Pro/Am	90	(Spain) E2P Racing	(Spain) Pablo Burguera (Portugal) Álvaro Parente (Spain) Antonio Sainero	Porsche 4.0 L Flat-6	+18 Laps	309
16	992 Pro	904	(Belgium) Red Ant Racing	(Belgium) Peter Guelinckx (Belgium) Michiel Haverans (Belgium) Brent Verheyen	Porsche 992 GT3 Cup	+20 Laps	307
16	992 Pro	904	(Belgium) Red Ant Racing	(Belgium) Peter Guelinckx (Belgium) Michiel Haverans (Belgium) Brent Verheyen	Porsche 4.0 L Flat-6	+20 Laps	307
17	GT3 Pro	29	(Italy) Pellin Racing	(United States) Lisa Clark (Canada) Kyle Marcelli (United States) Jeff Westphal	Ferrari 488 GT3 Evo 2020	+22 Laps	305
17	GT3 Pro	29	(Italy) Pellin Racing	(United States) Lisa Clark (Canada) Kyle Marcelli (United States) Jeff Westphal	Ferrari F154CB 3.9 L Turbo V8	+22 Laps	305
18	992 Am	917	(Switzerland) Orchid Racing Team	(Switzerland) Antonio Garzon (Switzerland) Daniel Gillioz (France) Laurène Godey (Switzerland) Alexandre Mottet (France) Frank Villiger	Porsche 992 GT3 Cup	+26 Laps	301
18	992 Am	917	(Switzerland) Orchid Racing Team	(Switzerland) Antonio Garzon (Switzerland) Daniel Gillioz (France) Laurène Godey (Switzerland) Alexandre Mottet (France) Frank Villiger	Porsche 4.0 L Flat-6	+26 Laps	301
19 DNF	992 Am	925	(Netherlands) Bas Koeten Racing	(Netherlands) Marcel van Berlo (Netherlands) Bob Herber	Porsche 992 GT3 Cup	+42 Laps	285
19 DNF	992 Am	925	(Netherlands) Bas Koeten Racing	(Netherlands) Marcel van Berlo (Netherlands) Bob Herber	Porsche 4.0 L Flat-6	+42 Laps	285
20	992 Am	908	(France) SebLajoux Racing by DUWO Racing	(France) Gilles Blasco (France) Jean-François Demorge (France) Stéphane Perrin (France) Philippe Polette	Porsche 992 GT3 Cup	+42 Laps	285
20	992 Am	908	(France) SebLajoux Racing by DUWO Racing	(France) Gilles Blasco (France) Jean-François Demorge (France) Stéphane Perrin (France) Philippe Polette	Porsche 4.0 L Flat-6	+42 Laps	285
21	GT3 Am	5	(Switzerland) Kessel Racing	(Switzerland) Alexandre Bochez (Switzerland) Mickaël Bochez (Turkey) Murat Cahadaroglu (Italy) Felice Jelmini	Ferrari 488 GT3 Evo 2020	+44 Laps	283
21	GT3 Am	5	(Switzerland) Kessel Racing	(Switzerland) Alexandre Bochez (Switzerland) Mickaël Bochez (Turkey) Murat Cahadaroglu (Italy) Felice Jelmini	Ferrari F154CB 3.9 L Turbo V8	+44 Laps	283
22	**GT4**	**416**	**(United Arab Emirates) Buggyra ZM Racing**	**(Seychelles) Aliyyah Koloc (Czech Republic) Adam Lacko (Czech Republic) David Vrsecky**	**Mercedes-AMG GT4**	**+47 Laps**	**280**
22	**GT4**	**416**	**(United Arab Emirates) Buggyra ZM Racing**	**(Seychelles) Aliyyah Koloc (Czech Republic) Adam Lacko (Czech Republic) David Vrsecky**	**Mercedes-AMG M178 4.0 L V8**	**+47 Laps**	**280**
23	992 Am	911	(South Korea) Hankook Competition	(South Korea) Roelof Bruins (Canada) Steven Cho (South Korea) Jongkyum Kim (Hong Kong) Dr. Ma	Porsche 992 GT3 Cup	+47 Laps	280
23	992 Am	911	(South Korea) Hankook Competition	(South Korea) Roelof Bruins (Canada) Steven Cho (South Korea) Jongkyum Kim (Hong Kong) Dr. Ma	Porsche 4.0 L Flat-6	+47 Laps	280
24	GT4	424	(Germany) Lionspeed GP	(United States) José Garcia (Germany) Patrick Kolb (United States) Daniel Miller	Porsche 718 Cayman GT4 RS Clubsport	+48 Laps	279
24	GT4	424	(Germany) Lionspeed GP	(United States) José Garcia (Germany) Patrick Kolb (United States) Daniel Miller	Porsche 4.0 L Flat-6	+48 Laps	279
25 DNF	GT3 Pro/Am	12	(Germany) Car Collection Motorsport	(United States) "Hash" (Switzerland) Alex Fontana (Switzerland) Ivan Jacoma (Germany) Yannick Mettler	Porsche 911 GT3 R (992)	+49 Laps	278
25 DNF	GT3 Pro/Am	12	(Germany) Car Collection Motorsport	(United States) "Hash" (Switzerland) Alex Fontana (Switzerland) Ivan Jacoma (Germany) Yannick Mettler	Porsche M97/80 4.2 L Flat-6	+49 Laps	278
26 DNF	GT3 Am	58	(Italy) MP Racing	(Italy) Corinna Gostner (Italy) David Gostner (Italy) Manuela Gostner (Italy) Thomas Gostner	Mercedes-AMG GT3 Evo	+63 Laps	264
26 DNF	GT3 Am	58	(Italy) MP Racing	(Italy) Corinna Gostner (Italy) David Gostner (Italy) Manuela Gostner (Italy) Thomas Gostner	Mercedes-AMG M159 6.2 L V8	+63 Laps	264
27	GT4	431	(Switzerland) Hofor Racing by Bonk Motorsport	(Switzerland) Martin Kroll (Germany) Michael Mayer (Germany) Rainer Partl	BMW M4 GT4 Gen II	+65 Laps	262
27	GT4	431	(Switzerland) Hofor Racing by Bonk Motorsport	(Switzerland) Martin Kroll (Germany) Michael Mayer (Germany) Rainer Partl	BMW N55 3.0 L Twin-turbo I6	+65 Laps	262
28	GT3 Am	11	(Switzerland) Hofor Racing	(Germany) Kenneth Heyer (Switzerland) Michael Kroll (Germany) Max Partl (Germany) Alexander Prinz (Switzerland) Chantal Prinz	Mercedes-AMG GT3	+73 Laps	254
28	GT3 Am	11	(Switzerland) Hofor Racing	(Germany) Kenneth Heyer (Switzerland) Michael Kroll (Germany) Max Partl (Germany) Alexander Prinz (Switzerland) Chantal Prinz	Mercedes-AMG M159 6.2 L V8	+73 Laps	254
29	GT3 Pro/Am	69	(Lithuania) RD Signs - Siauliai racing team	(Lithuania) Audrius Butkevicius (Italy) Nicola Machelon; Paulius Paskevicius	Lamborghini Huracán GT3 Evo	+75 Laps	252
29	GT3 Pro/Am	69	(Lithuania) RD Signs - Siauliai racing team	(Lithuania) Audrius Butkevicius (Italy) Nicola Machelon; Paulius Paskevicius	Lamborghini DGF 5.2 L V10	+75 Laps	252
30	**GTX**	**719**	**(Germany) 9und11 Racing**	**(Germany) Georg Goder (Germany) Ralf Oehme (Germany) Tim Scheerbarth (Germany) Martin Schlüter**	**Porsche 911 GT3 Cup II MR**	**+85 Laps**	**242**
30	**GTX**	**719**	**(Germany) 9und11 Racing**	**(Germany) Georg Goder (Germany) Ralf Oehme (Germany) Tim Scheerbarth (Germany) Martin Schlüter**	**Porsche 4.0 L Flat-6**	**+85 Laps**	**242**
31	GTX	701	(France) Vortex V8	(France) Lionel Amrouche (France) Philippe Bonnel (France) Gilles Courtois (France) Lucas Sugliano	Vortex 1.0	+89 Laps	238
31	GTX	701	(France) Vortex V8	(France) Lionel Amrouche (France) Philippe Bonnel (France) Gilles Courtois (France) Lucas Sugliano	Chevrolet 6.2 L V8	+89 Laps	238
32	992 Pro	909	(Netherlands) Red Camel-Jordans.nl	(Netherlands) Ivo Breukers (Netherlands) Luc Breukers (Switzerland) Fabian Danz	Porsche 992 GT3 Cup	+179 Laps	148
32	992 Pro	909	(Netherlands) Red Camel-Jordans.nl	(Netherlands) Ivo Breukers (Netherlands) Luc Breukers (Switzerland) Fabian Danz	Porsche 4.0 L Flat-6	+179 Laps	148
33 DNF	992 Am	993	(Lithuania) Porsche Baltic	(Lithuania) Eduardas Klepikas (Lithuania) Robertas Kupcikas (Lithuania) Domas Raudonis (Lithuania) Tautvydas Rudokas	Porsche 992 GT3 Cup	+195 Laps	132
33 DNF	992 Am	993	(Lithuania) Porsche Baltic	(Lithuania) Eduardas Klepikas (Lithuania) Robertas Kupcikas (Lithuania) Domas Raudonis (Lithuania) Tautvydas Rudokas	Porsche 4.0 L Flat-6	+195 Laps	132
34 DNF	992 Am	985	(Austria) Neuhofer Rennsport	Alexey Denisov (Austria) Felix Neuhofer (Austria) Markus Neuhofer (Germany) Manuel Zlof	Porsche 992 GT3 Cup	+159 Laps	168
34 DNF	992 Am	985	(Austria) Neuhofer Rennsport	Alexey Denisov (Austria) Felix Neuhofer (Austria) Markus Neuhofer (Germany) Manuel Zlof	Porsche 4.0 L Flat-6	+159 Laps	168
35 DNF	992 Am	907	(Germany) RPM Racing	(Germany) Philip Hamprecht (Sweden) Niclas Jönsson (United States) Tracy Krohn	Porsche 992 GT3 Cup	+175 Laps	152
35 DNF	992 Am	907	(Germany) RPM Racing	(Germany) Philip Hamprecht (Sweden) Niclas Jönsson (United States) Tracy Krohn	Porsche 4.0 L Flat-6	+175 Laps	152
36 DNS	GT4	418	(Spain) PCR Sport	(Spain) Harriet Arruabarrena (Spain) Vincente Dasi (Spain) Josep Parera	Mercedes-AMG GT4	+226 Laps	101
36 DNS	GT4	418	(Spain) PCR Sport	(Spain) Harriet Arruabarrena (Spain) Vincente Dasi (Spain) Josep Parera	Mercedes-AMG M178 4.0 L V8	+226 Laps	101

24H Series
Previous race: None	2024 season	Next race: 12 Hours of Spa-Francorchamps
