= 2023 12 Hours of Mugello =

9th running of the 12 Hours of Mugello

The layout of the Mugello Circuit

The 2023 12 Hours of Mugello (formally known as the Hankook 12 Hours of Mugello) was the ninth running of the 12 Hours of Mugello. It was also the second round of the 2023 24H GT Series and 2023 24H TCE Series. The race was won by Mathieu Detry, Stephane Perrin and Frédéric Vervisch in the #21 HAAS RT Audi R8 LMS GT3 Evo II.

== Schedule ==
Date	Time (local: CEST)	Event	Distance
Friday, 24 March	10:40 - 11:40	Practice (Both classes)	60 mins
Friday, 24 March	14:30 - 15:10	Qualifying - TCE & GT4	40 Mins
Friday, 24 March	15:40 - 16:20	Qualifying - GT	40 Mins
Saturday, 25 March	11:15 - 17:15	Race (Part 1)	6 Hours
Sunday, 26 March	09:00 - 15:00	Race (Part 2)	6 Hours

== Entry list ==
The entry list consisted of 39 cars; 31 were entered in GT and 8 were entered in TCE.

No.	Team	Car	Driver 1	Driver 2	Driver 3	Driver 4	Driver 5	Class
GT3 (13 entries)
8	(Switzerland) Kessel Racing	Ferrari 488 GT3 Evo 2020	(Italy) Alessandro Cutrera	(Italy) Marco Frezza	(Italy) David Fumanelli	(Italy) Marco Talarico	(Italy) Leonardo-Maria del Vecchio	P
11	(Switzerland) Hofor Racing	Mercedes-AMG GT3	(Switzerland) Michael Kroll	(Germany) Alexander Prinz	(Switzerland) Chantal Prinz	(Germany) Carsten Tilke	-	Am
21	(Antigua and Barbuda) HAAS RT	Audi R8 LMS Evo II	(Belgium) Mathieu Detry	(France) Stephane Perrin	(Belgium) Frédéric Vervisch	-	-	P
26	(France) Saintéloc Junior Team	Audi R8 LMS Evo II	(France) Erwan Bastard	(France) Paul Evrard	-	-	-	P
27	(United States) Heart of Racing by SPS	Mercedes-AMG GT3	(Canada) Roman De Angelis	(United Kingdom) Ian James	(United States) Gray Newell	-	-	Am
34	(Germany) Land Motorsport	Audi R8 LMS Evo II	(Germany) Johannes Dr. Kirchhoff	(Germany) Ingo Vogler	(Germany) Tim Vogler	-	-	Am
55	(Germany) Land Motorsport	Audi R8 LMS Evo II	(Germany) Christopher Mies	(Germany) Tim Müller	(Germany) Stefan Wieninger	-	-	PA
71	(Lithuania) Juta Racing	Audi R8 LMS Evo II	(Lithuania) Arunas Geciauskas	(Lithuania) Jonas Gelžinis	(Lithuania) Vytenis Gulbinas	(Ukraine) Evgeny Sokolovsky	-	Am
72	(Lithuania) Juta Racing	Audi R8 LMS Evo	(Lithuania) Oskaras Brazaitis	(Lithuania) Egidijus Gelūnas	(Lithuania) Aurimas Jablonskis	(Lithuania) Audrius Navickas	-	Am
85	(United States) CP Racing	Mercedes-AMG GT3 Evo	(United States) Charles Espenlaub	(United States) Shane Lewis	(United States) Charles Putman	-	-	Am
88	(France) AKKODIS ASP Team	Mercedes-AMG GT3 Evo	(France) Jean-Luc Beabelique	(France) Jérôme Policand	(France) Benjamin Ricci	(France) Mauro Ricci	-	Am
90	(Spain) E2P Racing	Porsche 911 GT3 R (991)	(Spain) Pablo Burguera	(Spain) Javier Morcillo	(Spain) Antonio Sainero	-	-	Am
91	(Germany) Herberth Motorsport	Porsche 911 GT3 R (991)	(Switzerland) Daniel Allemann	(Germany) Rolf Bohn	(Germany) Alfred Renauer	(Germany) Robert Renauer	-	PA
GTX (5 entries)
701	(France) Vortex V8	Vortex 1.0 GTX	(France) Lionel Amrouche	(France) Philippe Bonnel	(France) Philippe Gruau	-	-	N/A
702	(France) Vortex V8	Vortex 1.0 GTX	(France) Pierre Fontaine	(Switzerland) Laurent Misbach	(France) Lucas Sugliano	-	-	N/A
719	(Germany) 9und11 Racing	Porsche 991 GT3 II Cup MR	(Germany) Georg Goder	(Germany) Leonard Oehme	(Germany) Ralf Oehme	(Germany) Martin Schlüter	-	N/A
720	(Lithuania) RD Signs – Siauliai Racing Team	Lamborghini Huracán Super Trofeo Evo 2	(Lithuania) Audrius Butkevicius	(Italy) Nicola Michelon	(Lithuania) Paulius Paskevicius	-	-	N/A
726	(Italy) Lotus PB Racing	Lotus Exige V6 Cup R	(Italy) Stefano D'Aste	(Monaco) Luca Littardi	(Italy) Costantino Peroni	(Monaco) Vito Utzieri	(Italy) Pietro Vergnano	N/A
992 (13 entries)
903	(Belgium) Red Ant Racing	Porsche 992 GT3 Cup	(Belgium) Kobe de Breucker	(Belgium) Ayrton Redant	(Belgium) Yannick Redant	-	-	P
904	(Belgium) Red Ant Racing	Porsche 992 GT3 Cup	(Belgium) Steve van Bellingen	(Belgium) Bert Redant	(Belgium) Dirk van Rompuy	(Belgium) Tom van Rompuy	-	Am
907	(Germany) RPM Racing	Porsche 992 GT3 Cup	(Germany) Philip Hamprecht	(Sweden) Niclas Jönsson	(United States) Tracy Krohn	-	-	Am
909	(Netherlands) Red Camel-Jordans.nl	Porsche 992 GT3 Cup	(Netherlands) Ivo Breukers	(Netherlands) Luc Breukers	(Netherlands) Rik Breukers	(Switzerland) Fabian Danz	-	P
912	(Switzerland) Centri Porsche Ticino	Porsche 992 GT3 Cup	(Italy) Max Busnelli	(Italy) Francesco Fenici	(Switzerland) Ivan Jacoma	(Switzerland) Valerio Presezzi	-	Am
923	(Italy) Enrico Fulgenzi Racing	Porsche 992 GT3 Cup	(Japan) Shintaro Akatsu	(Italy) Enrico Fulgenzi	(Italy) Kikko Galbiat	-	-	P
928	(Germany) NKPP by HRT Performance	Porsche 992 GT3 Cup	(Netherlands) Gjis Bessem	(Netherlands) Harry Hilders	-	-	-	Am
930	(Germany) HRT Performance	Porsche 992 GT3 Cup	(Netherlands) Marcel van Berlo	(Netherlands) Bob Herber	-	-	-	Am
955	(Romania) Willi Motorsport by Ebimotors	Porsche 992 GT3 Cup	(Italy) Fabrizio Broggi	(Italy) Sabino de Castro	(Romania) Sergiu Nicolae	-	-	P
967	(Germany) HRT Performance	Porsche 992 GT3 Cup	(Switzerland) Stefano Monaco	(Italy) Amedeo Pampanini	(Italy) Roberto Pampanini	(Switzerland) Nicolas Stürzinger	-	P
973	(Italy) Ebimotors	Porsche 992 GT3 Cup	(Italy) Gianluca Giorgi	(Italy) Paolo Gnemmi	(Italy) Gianluigi Piccioli	(Italy) Paolo Venerosi	-	Am
985	(Austria) Neuhofer Rennsport	Porsche 992 GT3 Cup	(Germany) Michael Birkner	(Austria) Felix Neuhofer	(Austria) Markus Neuhofer	(Austria) Martin Ragginger	-	P
992	(Lithuania) Porsche Baltic	Porsche 992 GT3 Cup	(Lithuania) Robertas Kupcikas	(Lithuania) Andrius Šlimas	(Lithuania) Tautvydas Rudokas	(Lithuania) Paulius Žadeika	-	Am
GT4 (3 entries)
403	(South Korea) Atlas BX Motorsports	Mercedes-AMG GT4	(Netherlands) Roelof Bruins	(Canada) Steven Cho	(South Korea) Jongkyum Kim	-	-	N/A
416	(United Arab Emirates) Buggyra ZM Racing	Mercedes-AMG GT4	(Seychelles) Aliyyah Koloc	(Czech Republic) Adam Lacko	(Czech Republic) David Vrsecky	-	-	N/A
438	(United Kingdom) Simpson Motorsport	BMW M4 GT4 Gen II	(United Kingdom) Carl Cavers	(United Kingdom) David Holloway	(Cyprus) Vasily Vladykin	-	-	N/A
TCR (1 entry)
147	(Italy) Aikoa Racing	Audi RS 3 LMS TCR (2017)	(Italy) Nicola Baldan	(Italy) Filippo Barberi	(Italy) Francesco Cardone	(Argentina) Franco Girolami	(Italy) Sandro Pelatti	N/A
TCX (2 entries)
215	(France) SK Racing	Ligier JS2 R	(France) Jérôme Da Costa	(France) Franck Eburderie	(France) Alain Ferté	(France) Franco Lemma	-	N/A
251	(Sweden) Primus Racing	BMW M2 ClubSport Racing	(Sweden) Hampus Hedin	(Sweden) Peter Larsen	(Sweden) Johan Rosen	-	-	N/A
TC (2 entries)
331	(Switzerland) Hofor Racing by Bonk Motorsport	BMW M2 ClubSport Racing	(Germany) Michael Bonk	(Switzerland) Martin Kroll	(Germany) Felix Partl	(Germany) Max Partl	-	N/A
332	(Switzerland) Hofor Racing by Bonk Motorsport	BMW M2 ClubSport Racing	(Germany) Hermann Bock	(Germany) Michael Bonk	(Switzerland) Martin Kroll	(Germany) Volker Piepmeyer	-	N/A
SP4 (1 entry)
600	(Germany) Herberth Motorsport	Porsche 911 GT3 R (992)	(Switzerland) Daniel Allemann	(Germany) Ralf Bohn	(Germany) Alfred Renauer	(Germany) Robert Renauer	-	N/A

Icon	Class
P	GT3-Pro
PA	GT3-Pro Am
Am	GT3-Am

== Results ==
=== Qualifying ===
Qualifying was split into three parts. The average of the best times per qualifying session determined the starting order.

==== GT ====
Fastest in class in **bold**.

Pos.	Class	No.	Team	Q1	Q2	Q3	Avg
1	**GT3-Pro/Am**	**91**	(Germany) **Herberth Motorsport**	1:49.739	1:48.227	1:48.878	**1:48.948**
2	**GT3-Am**	**27**	(United States) **Heart of Racing by SPS**	1:49.923	1:47.950	1:51.862	**1:49.911**
3	GT3-Am	88	(France) AKKODIS ASP Team	1:49.242	1:51.972	1:49.686	1:50.300
4	**GT3**	**26**	(France) **Saintéloc Junior Team**	1:51.209	1:49.737	1:49.978	**1:50.308**
5	GT3-Am	85	(United States) CP Racing	1:52.631	1:49.478	1:49.324	1:50.477
6	GT3-Pro/Am	55	(Germany) Land Motorsport	1:52.814	1:47.652	1:51.087	1:50.517
7	GT3	21	(Antigua and Barbuda) HAAS RT	1:55.965	1:48.110	1:49.024	1:51.033
8	GT3-Am	71	(Lithuania) Juta Racing	1:54.497	1:51.922	1:49.151	1:51.856
9	**992**	**903**	(Belgium) **Red Ant Racing**	1:52.186	1:52.827	1:53.144	**1:52.719**
10	GT3-Am	11	(Switzerland) Hofor Racing	1:49.821	1:52.918	1:55.875	1:52.871
11	992	909	(Netherlands) Red Camel-Jordans.nl	1:53.477	1:51.974	1:53.359	1:52.936
12	**992-Am**	**912**	(Switzerland) **Centri Porsche Ticino**	1:52.895	1:53.095	1:55.016	**1:53.668**
13	992	955	(Italy) Willi Motorsport by Ebimotors	1:54.728	1:53.032	1:53.717	1:53.825
14	GT3-Am	34	(Germany) Land Motorsport	1:53.780	1:52.230	1:55.691	1:53.900
15	GT3-Am	90	(Spain) E2P Racing	1:58.040	1:51.963	1:51.913	1:53.972
16	992	985	(Austria) Neuhofer Rennsport	1:56.572	1:52.363	1:53.497	1:54.144
17	**GTX**	**720**	(Lithuania) RD Signs - Siauliai Racing Team	1:56.028	1:54.797	1:52.414	1:54.413
18	992-Am	907	(Germany) RPM Racing	1:53.486	1:53.366	1:58.391	1:55.081
19	GT3-Am	72	(Lithuania) Juta Racing	1:56.569	1:57.045	1:52.079	1:55.231
20	992-Am	973	(Italy) Ebimotors	1:54.617	1:54.394	1:58.092	1:55.701
21	992-Am	928	(Germany) NKPP by HRT Performance	1:56.884	1:56.260	1:56.260	1:56.468
22	992-Am	930	(Germany) HRT Performance	1:54.961	1:58.086	1:56.867	1:56.638
23	992-Am	904	(Belgium) Red Ant Racing	1:56.114	1:54.680	1:59.191	1:56.661
24	GTX	701	(France) Vortex V8	1:54.157	1:56.133	2:03.947	1:58.079
25	992-Am	992	(Lithuania) Porsche Baltic	2:05.992	1:57.094	1:53.461	1:58.849
26	GTX	719	(Germany) 9und11 Racing	2:01.034	1:58.538	1:57.497	1:59.023
27	992	923	(Italy) Enrico Fulgenzi Racing	2:17.200	1:54.154	1:53.546	2:01.633
28	GTX	726	(Italy) PB Racing	2:10.172	1:57.492	2:09.119	2:05.594
29	GT3	8	(Switzerland) Kessel Racing	No time (Note: Due to not setting a time in the first GT qualifying session, the car has been placed at the back of the grid.)	1:49.675	1:48.883	1:49.279
30	992	967	(Germany) HRT Performance	No time	1:53.030	1:56.094	1:54.562
31	GTX	702	(France) Vortex V8	No time	1:59.606	2:01.180	2:00.393

==== TCE ====
Fastest in class in **bold**.

Pos.	Class	No.	Team	Q1	Q2	Q3	Avg
1	**GT4**	**416**	(United Arab Emirates) **Buggyra ZM Racing**	1:57.968	2:00.132	2:00.570	**1:59.556**
2	GT4	403	(South Korea) Atlas BX Motorsports	1:59.315	1:59.992	2:00.390	1:59.899
3	GT4	438	(United Kingdom) Simpson Motorsport	1:59.554	1:59.940	2:01.407	2:00.300
4	**TCX**	**215**	(France) **SK Racing**	2:02.993	2:03.573	2:01.624	**2:02.730**
5	TCX	251	(Sweden) Primus Racing	2:04.960	2:05.283	2:05.301	2:05.181
6	**TCR**	**147**	(Italy) **AIKOA Racing**	2:04.734	2:09.176	2:19.926	**2:11.278**
7	**TC**	**331**	(Switzerland) **Hofor Racing by Bonk Motorsport**	2:08.466	2:12.086	2:24.471	**2:15.007**
8	TC	332	(Switzerland) Hofor Racing by Bonk Motorsport	2:09.971	2:11.900	No time (Note: Due to not setting a time in the third TCE qualifying session, the car has been placed at the back of the grid.)	2:10.935

== Race ==
=== Part 1 ===
Class winner in bold.

Pos	Class	No.	Team	Drivers	Car	Time/Reason	Laps
Pos	Class	No.	Team	Drivers	Engine	Time/Reason	Laps
1	GT3-Pro	21	(Antigua and Barbuda) HAAS RT	(Belgium) Mathieu Detry (France) Stephane Perrin (Belgium) Frédéric Vervisch	Audi R8 LMS Evo II	6:01:47.308	172
1	GT3-Pro	21	(Antigua and Barbuda) HAAS RT	(Belgium) Mathieu Detry (France) Stephane Perrin (Belgium) Frédéric Vervisch	Audi 5.2L FSI V10	6:01:47.308	172
2	GT3-Pro	26	(France) Saintéloc Junior Team	(France) Erwan Bastard (France) Paul Evrard	Audi R8 LMS Evo II	+34.991s	172
2	GT3-Pro	26	(France) Saintéloc Junior Team	(France) Erwan Bastard (France) Paul Evrard	Audi 5.2L FSI V10	+34.991s	172
3	GT3-Am	34	(Germany) Land Motorsport	(Germany) Johannes Dr. Kirchhoff (Germany) Ingo Vogler (Germany) Tim Vogler	Audi R8 LMS Evo II	+2 Laps	170
3	GT3-Am	34	(Germany) Land Motorsport	(Germany) Johannes Dr. Kirchhoff (Germany) Ingo Vogler (Germany) Tim Vogler	Audi 5.2L FSI V10	+2 Laps	170
4	GT3-Pro-Am	55	(Germany) Land Motorsport	(Germany) Christopher Mies (Germany) Tim Müller (Germany) Stefan Wieninger	Audi R8 LMS Evo II	+2 Laps	170
4	GT3-Pro-Am	55	(Germany) Land Motorsport	(Germany) Christopher Mies (Germany) Tim Müller (Germany) Stefan Wieninger	Audi 5.2L FSI V10	+2 Laps	170
5	GT3-Am	11	(Switzerland) Hofor Racing	(Switzerland) Michael Kroll (Germany) Alexander Prinz (Switzerland) Chantal Prinz (Germany) Carsten Tilke	Mercedes-AMG GT3	+2 Laps	170
5	GT3-Am	11	(Switzerland) Hofor Racing	(Switzerland) Michael Kroll (Germany) Alexander Prinz (Switzerland) Chantal Prinz (Germany) Carsten Tilke	Mercedes-Benz 6.2L M159 V8	+2 Laps	170
6	GT3-Am	27	(United States) Heart of Racing by SPS	(Canada) Roman De Angelis (United Kingdom) Ian James (United States) Gray Newell	Mercedes-AMG GT3	+2 Laps	170
6	GT3-Am	27	(United States) Heart of Racing by SPS	(Canada) Roman De Angelis (United Kingdom) Ian James (United States) Gray Newell	Mercedes-Benz 6.2L M159 V8	+2 Laps	170
7	992-Pro	955	(Romania) Willi Motorsport by Ebimotors	(Italy) Fabrizio Broggi (Italy) Sabino de Castro (Romania) Sergiu Nicolae	Porsche 992 GT3 Cup	+2 Laps	170
7	992-Pro	955	(Romania) Willi Motorsport by Ebimotors	(Italy) Fabrizio Broggi (Italy) Sabino de Castro (Romania) Sergiu Nicolae	Porsche 4.0 L Flat-6	+2 Laps	170
8	992-Pro	985	(Austria) Neuhofer Rennsport	(Germany) Michael Birkner (Austria) Felix Neuhofer (Austria) Markus Neuhofer (Austria) Martin Ragginger	Porsche 992 GT3 Cup	+3 Laps	169
8	992-Pro	985	(Austria) Neuhofer Rennsport	(Germany) Michael Birkner (Austria) Felix Neuhofer (Austria) Markus Neuhofer (Austria) Martin Ragginger	Porsche 4.0 L Flat-6	+3 Laps	169
9	992-Pro	923	(Italy) Enrico Fulgenzi Racing	(Japan) Shintaro Akatsu (Italy) Enrico Fulgenzi (Italy) Kikko Galbiati	Porsche 992 GT3 Cup	+4 Laps	168
9	992-Pro	923	(Italy) Enrico Fulgenzi Racing	(Japan) Shintaro Akatsu (Italy) Enrico Fulgenzi (Italy) Kikko Galbiati	Porsche 4.0 L Flat-6	+4 Laps	168
10	992-Pro	903	(Belgium) Red Ant Racing	(Belgium) Kobe de Breucker (Belgium) Ayrton Redant (Belgium) Yannick Redant	Porsche 992 GT3 Cup	+4 Laps	168
10	992-Pro	903	(Belgium) Red Ant Racing	(Belgium) Kobe de Breucker (Belgium) Ayrton Redant (Belgium) Yannick Redant	Porsche 4.0 L Flat-6	+4 Laps	168
11	992-Pro	909	(Netherlands) Red Camel-Jordans.nl	(Netherlands) Ivo Breukers (Netherlands) Luc Breukers (Netherlands) Rik Breukers (Switzerland) Fabian Danz	Porsche 992 GT3 Cup	+4 Laps	168
11	992-Pro	909	(Netherlands) Red Camel-Jordans.nl	(Netherlands) Ivo Breukers (Netherlands) Luc Breukers (Netherlands) Rik Breukers (Switzerland) Fabian Danz	Porsche 4.0 L Flat-6	+4 Laps	168
12	GT3-Am	88	(France) AKKODIS ASP Team	(France) Jean-Luc Beaubelique (France) Jérôme Policand (France) Benjamin Ricci (France) Mauro Ricci	Mercedes-AMG GT3	+4 Laps	168
12	GT3-Am	88	(France) AKKODIS ASP Team	(France) Jean-Luc Beaubelique (France) Jérôme Policand (France) Benjamin Ricci (France) Mauro Ricci	Mercedes-Benz 6.2L M159 V8	+4 Laps	168
13	992-Am	973	(Italy) Ebimotors	(Italy) Gianluca Giorgi (Italy) Paolo Gnemmi (Italy) Gianluigi Piccioli (Italy) Paolo Venerosi	Porsche 992 GT3 Cup	+5 Laps	167
13	992-Am	973	(Italy) Ebimotors	(Italy) Gianluca Giorgi (Italy) Paolo Gnemmi (Italy) Gianluigi Piccioli (Italy) Paolo Venerosi	Porsche 4.0 L Flat-6	+5 Laps	167
14	992-Am	907	(Germany) RPM Racing	(Germany) Philip Hamprecht (Sweden) Niclas Jönsson (United States) Tracy Krohn	Porsche 992 GT3 Cup	+5 Laps	167
14	992-Am	907	(Germany) RPM Racing	(Germany) Philip Hamprecht (Sweden) Niclas Jönsson (United States) Tracy Krohn	Porsche 4.0 L Flat-6	+5 Laps	167
15	992-Am	912	(Switzerland) Centri Porsche Ticino	(Italy) Max Busnelli (Italy) Francesco Fenici (Switzerland) Ivan Jacoma (Switzerland) Valerio Presezzi	Porsche 992 GT3 Cup	+5 Laps	167
15	992-Am	912	(Switzerland) Centri Porsche Ticino	(Italy) Max Busnelli (Italy) Francesco Fenici (Switzerland) Ivan Jacoma (Switzerland) Valerio Presezzi	Porsche 4.0 L Flat-6	+5 Laps	167
16	992-Am	930	(Germany) HRT Performance	(Netherlands) Marcel van Berlo (Netherlands) Bob Herber	Porsche 992 GT3 Cup	+6 Laps	166
16	992-Am	930	(Germany) HRT Performance	(Netherlands) Marcel van Berlo (Netherlands) Bob Herber	Porsche 4.0 L Flat-6	+6 Laps	166
17	GT3-Am	90	(Spain) E2P Racing	(Spain) Pablo Burguera (Spain) Javier Morcillo (Spain) Antonio Sainero	Porsche 911 GT3 R (991.2)	+6 Laps	166
17	GT3-Am	90	(Spain) E2P Racing	(Spain) Pablo Burguera (Spain) Javier Morcillo (Spain) Antonio Sainero	Porsche 4.0 L Flat-6	+6 Laps	166
18	GT3-Am	71	(Lithuania) Juta Racing	(Lithuania) Arunas Geciauskas (Lithuania) Jonas Gelžinis (Lithuania) Vytenis Gulbinas (Ukraine) Evgeny Sokolovsky	Audi R8 LMS Evo II	+6 Laps	166
18	GT3-Am	71	(Lithuania) Juta Racing	(Lithuania) Arunas Geciauskas (Lithuania) Jonas Gelžinis (Lithuania) Vytenis Gulbinas (Ukraine) Evgeny Sokolovsky	Audi 5.2L FSI V10	+6 Laps	166
19	992-Am	928	(Germany) NKPP by HRT Performance	(Netherlands) Gijs Bessem (Netherlands) Harry Hilders	Porsche 992 GT3 Cup	+6 Laps	166
19	992-Am	928	(Germany) NKPP by HRT Performance	(Netherlands) Gijs Bessem (Netherlands) Harry Hilders	Porsche 4.0 L Flat-6	+6 Laps	166
20	992-Pro	967	(Germany) HRT Performance	(Switzerland) Stefano Monaco (Italy) Amadeo Pampanini (Italy) Roberto Pampanini (Switzerland) Nicolas Stürzinger	Porsche 992 GT3 Cup	+7 Laps	165
20	992-Pro	967	(Germany) HRT Performance	(Switzerland) Stefano Monaco (Italy) Amadeo Pampanini (Italy) Roberto Pampanini (Switzerland) Nicolas Stürzinger	Porsche 4.0 L Flat-6	+7 Laps	165
21	GT3-Pro	8	(Switzerland) Kessel Racing	(Italy) Alessandro Cutrera (Italy) Marco Frezza (Italy) David Fumanelli (Italy) Marco Talarico (Italy) Leonardo-Maria del Vecchio	Ferrari 488 GT3 Evo 2020	+7 Laps	165
21	GT3-Pro	8	(Switzerland) Kessel Racing	(Italy) Alessandro Cutrera (Italy) Marco Frezza (Italy) David Fumanelli (Italy) Marco Talarico (Italy) Leonardo-Maria del Vecchio	Ferrari 3.9 L Twin-Turbo V8	+7 Laps	165
22	GTX	720	(Lithuania) RD Signs – Siauliai Racing Team	(Lithuania) Audrius Butkevicius (Italy) Nicola Michelon (Lithuania) Paulius Paskevicius	Lamborghini Huracán Super Trofeo Evo 2	+8 Laps	164
22	GTX	720	(Lithuania) RD Signs – Siauliai Racing Team	(Lithuania) Audrius Butkevicius (Italy) Nicola Michelon (Lithuania) Paulius Paskevicius	Lamborghini 5.2 L V10	+8 Laps	164
23	992-Am	992	(Lithuania) Porsche Baltic	(Lithuania) Robertas Kupcikas (Lithuania) Andrius Šlimas (Lithuania) Tautvydas Rudokas (Lithuania) Paulius Žadeika	Porsche 992 GT3 Cup	+10 Laps	162
23	992-Am	992	(Lithuania) Porsche Baltic	(Lithuania) Robertas Kupcikas (Lithuania) Andrius Šlimas (Lithuania) Tautvydas Rudokas (Lithuania) Paulius Žadeika	Porsche 4.0 L Flat-6	+10 Laps	162
24	GT3-Am	72	(Lithuania) Juta Racing	(Lithuania) Oskaras Brazaitis (Lithuania) Egidijus Gelūnas (Lithuania) Aurimas Jablonskis (Lithuania) Audrius Navickas	Audi R8 LMS Evo	+10 Laps	162
24	GT3-Am	72	(Lithuania) Juta Racing	(Lithuania) Oskaras Brazaitis (Lithuania) Egidijus Gelūnas (Lithuania) Aurimas Jablonskis (Lithuania) Audrius Navickas	Audi 5.2L FSI V10	+10 Laps	162
25	GTX	701	(France) Vortex V8	(France) Lionel Amrouche (France) Philippe Bonnel (France) Philippe Gruau	Vortex 1.0 GTX	+10 Laps	162
25	GTX	701	(France) Vortex V8	(France) Lionel Amrouche (France) Philippe Bonnel (France) Philippe Gruau	Chevrolet 6.2 L V8	+10 Laps	162
26	GTX	702	(France) Vortex V8	(France) Pierre Fontaine (Switzerland) Laurent Misbach (France) Lucas Sugliano	Vortex 1.0 GTX	+13 Laps	159
26	GTX	702	(France) Vortex V8	(France) Pierre Fontaine (Switzerland) Laurent Misbach (France) Lucas Sugliano	Chevrolet 6.2 L V8	+13 Laps	159
27 DNF	GT4	403	(South Korea) Atlas BX Motorsports	(Netherlands) Roelof Bruins (Canada) Steven Cho (South Korea) Jongkyum Kim	Mercedes-AMG GT4	+14 Laps	158
27 DNF	GT4	403	(South Korea) Atlas BX Motorsports	(Netherlands) Roelof Bruins (Canada) Steven Cho (South Korea) Jongkyum Kim	Mercedes-AMG M178 4.0 L V8	+14 Laps	158
28	992-Am	904	(Belgium) Red Ant Racing	(Belgium) Steve van Bellingen (Belgium) Bert Redant (Belgium) Dirk van Rompuy (Belgium) Tom van Rompuy	Porsche 992 GT3 Cup	+17 Laps	155
28	992-Am	904	(Belgium) Red Ant Racing	(Belgium) Steve van Bellingen (Belgium) Bert Redant (Belgium) Dirk van Rompuy (Belgium) Tom van Rompuy	Porsche 4.0 L Flat-6	+17 Laps	155
29	GT4	416	(United Arab Emirates) Buggyra ZM Racing	(Seychelles) Aliyyah Koloc (Czech Republic) Adam Lacko (Czech Republic) David Vrsecky	Mercedes-AMG GT4	+18 Laps	154
29	GT4	416	(United Arab Emirates) Buggyra ZM Racing	(Seychelles) Aliyyah Koloc (Czech Republic) Adam Lacko (Czech Republic) David Vrsecky	Mercedes-AMG M178 4.0 L V8	+18 Laps	154
30	TCX	251	(Sweden) Primus Racing	(Sweden) Hampus Hedin (Sweden) Peter Larsen (Sweden) Johan Rosen	BMW M2 ClubSport Racing	+24 Laps	148
30	TCX	251	(Sweden) Primus Racing	(Sweden) Hampus Hedin (Sweden) Peter Larsen (Sweden) Johan Rosen	BMW S55B30T0 3.0 L I6	+24 Laps	148
31 DNF	GT4	438	(United Kingdom) Simpson Motorsport	(United Kingdom) Carl Cavers (United Kingdom) David Holloway (Cyprus) Vasily Vladykin	BMW M4 GT4 Gen II	+25 Laps	147
31 DNF	GT4	438	(United Kingdom) Simpson Motorsport	(United Kingdom) Carl Cavers (United Kingdom) David Holloway (Cyprus) Vasily Vladykin	BMW N55 3.0 L Twin-Turbo I6	+25 Laps	147
32	TC	332	(Switzerland) Hofor Racing by Bonk Motorsport	(Germany) Hermann Bock (Germany) Michael Bonk (Switzerland) Martin Kroll (Germany) Volker Piepmeyer	BMW M2 ClubSport Racing	+26 Laps	146
32	TC	332	(Switzerland) Hofor Racing by Bonk Motorsport	(Germany) Hermann Bock (Germany) Michael Bonk (Switzerland) Martin Kroll (Germany) Volker Piepmeyer	BMW S55B30T0 3.0 L I6	+26 Laps	146
33	TC	331	(Switzerland) Hofor Racing by Bonk Motorsport	(Germany) Michael Bonk (Switzerland) Martin Kroll (Germany) Felix Partl (Germany) Max Partl	BMW M2 ClubSport Racing	+26 Laps	146
33	TC	331	(Switzerland) Hofor Racing by Bonk Motorsport	(Germany) Michael Bonk (Switzerland) Martin Kroll (Germany) Felix Partl (Germany) Max Partl	BMW S55B30T0 3.0 L I6	+26 Laps	146
34 DNF	GTX	719	(Germany) 9und11 Racing	(Germany) Georg Goder (Germany) Leonard Oehme (Germany) Ralf Oehme (Germany) Martin Schlüter	Porsche 991 GT3 II Cup MR	+29 Laps	143
34 DNF	GTX	719	(Germany) 9und11 Racing	(Germany) Georg Goder (Germany) Leonard Oehme (Germany) Ralf Oehme (Germany) Martin Schlüter	Porsche 4.0 L Flat-6	+29 Laps	143
35 DNF	GT3-Am	85	(United States) CP Racing	(United States) Charles Espenlaub (United States) Shane Lewis (United States) Charles Putman	Mercedes-AMG GT3 Evo	+40 Laps	132
35 DNF	GT3-Am	85	(United States) CP Racing	(United States) Charles Espenlaub (United States) Shane Lewis (United States) Charles Putman	Mercedes-AMG M159 6.2 L V8	+40 Laps	132
36	TCR	147	(Italy) Aikoa Racing	(Italy) Nicola Baldan (Italy) Filippo Barberi (Italy) Francesco Cardone (Argentina) Franco Girolami (Italy) Sandro Pelatti	Audi RS 3 LMS TCR (2017)	+49 Laps	123
36	TCR	147	(Italy) Aikoa Racing	(Italy) Nicola Baldan (Italy) Filippo Barberi (Italy) Francesco Cardone (Argentina) Franco Girolami (Italy) Sandro Pelatti	Volkswagen EA888 2.0 L I4	+49 Laps	123
37 DNF	TCX	215	(France) SK Racing	(France) Jérôme Da Costa (France) Franck Eburderie (France) Alain Ferté (France) Franco Lemma	Ligier JS2 R	+75 Laps	97
37 DNF	TCX	215	(France) SK Racing	(France) Jérôme Da Costa (France) Franck Eburderie (France) Alain Ferté (France) Franco Lemma	Ford Cyclone 3.7 L V6	+75 Laps	97
38 DNF	SP4	600	(Germany) Herberth Motorsport	(Switzerland) Daniel Allemann (Germany) Ralf Bohn (Germany) Alfred Renauer (Germany) Robert Renauer	Porsche 911 GT3 R (992)	+95 Laps	77
38 DNF	SP4	600	(Germany) Herberth Motorsport	(Switzerland) Daniel Allemann (Germany) Ralf Bohn (Germany) Alfred Renauer (Germany) Robert Renauer	Porsche 4.2 L Flat-6	+95 Laps	77
39 DNF	GTX	726	(Italy) Lotus PB Racing	(Italy) Stefano D'Aste (Monaco) Luca Littardi (Italy) Costantino Peroni (Monaco) Vito Utzieri (Italy) Pietro Vergnano	Lotus Exige V6 Cup R	+148 Laps	24
39 DNF	GTX	726	(Italy) Lotus PB Racing	(Italy) Stefano D'Aste (Monaco) Luca Littardi (Italy) Costantino Peroni (Monaco) Vito Utzieri (Italy) Pietro Vergnano	Toyota 3.5 L V6	+148 Laps	24
40 DNF	GT3-Pro-Am	91	(Germany) Herberth Motorsport	(Switzerland) Daniel Allemann (Germany) Ralf Bohn (Germany) Alfred Renauer (Germany) Robert Renauer	Porsche 911 GT3 R (991.2)	+149 Laps	23
40 DNF	GT3-Pro-Am	91	(Germany) Herberth Motorsport	(Switzerland) Daniel Allemann (Germany) Ralf Bohn (Germany) Alfred Renauer (Germany) Robert Renauer	Porsche 4.0 L Flat-6	+149 Laps	23

=== Part 2 ===
Pos	Class	No.	Team	Drivers	Car	Time/Reason	Laps
Pos	Class	No.	Team	Drivers	Engine	Time/Reason	Laps
1	GT3-Pro	21	(Antigua and Barbuda) HAAS RT	(Belgium) Mathieu Detry (France) Stephane Perrin (Belgium) Frédéric Vervisch	Audi R8 LMS Evo II	6:00:10.244	341 - combined laps
1	GT3-Pro	21	(Antigua and Barbuda) HAAS RT	(Belgium) Mathieu Detry (France) Stephane Perrin (Belgium) Frédéric Vervisch	Audi 5.2L FSI V10	6:00:10.244	341 - combined laps
2	GT3-Pro	26	(France) Saintéloc Junior Team	(France) Erwan Bastard (France) Paul Evrard	Audi R8 LMS Evo II	+2 Laps	339
2	GT3-Pro	26	(France) Saintéloc Junior Team	(France) Erwan Bastard (France) Paul Evrard	Audi 5.2L FSI V10	+2 Laps	339
3	GT3-Am	27	(United States) Heart of Racing by SPS	(Canada) Roman De Angelis (United Kingdom) Ian James (United States) Gray Newell	Mercedes-AMG GT3	+3 Laps	338
3	GT3-Am	27	(United States) Heart of Racing by SPS	(Canada) Roman De Angelis (United Kingdom) Ian James (United States) Gray Newell	Mercedes-Benz 6.2L M159 V8	+3 Laps	338
4	992-Pro	955	(Romania) Willi Motorsport by Ebimotors	(Italy) Fabrizio Broggi (Italy) Sabino de Castro (Romania) Sergiu Nicolae	Porsche 992 GT3 Cup	+5 Laps	336
4	992-Pro	955	(Romania) Willi Motorsport by Ebimotors	(Italy) Fabrizio Broggi (Italy) Sabino de Castro (Romania) Sergiu Nicolae	Porsche 4.0 L Flat-6	+5 Laps	336
5	GT3-Am	11	(Switzerland) Hofor Racing	(Switzerland) Michael Kroll (Germany) Alexander Prinz (Switzerland) Chantal Prinz (Germany) Carsten Tilke	Mercedes-AMG GT3	+5 Laps	336
5	GT3-Am	11	(Switzerland) Hofor Racing	(Switzerland) Michael Kroll (Germany) Alexander Prinz (Switzerland) Chantal Prinz (Germany) Carsten Tilke	Mercedes-Benz 6.2L M159 V8	+5 Laps	336
6	GT3-Am	88	(France) AKKODIS ASP Team	(France) Jean-Luc Beaubelique (France) Jérôme Policand (France) Benjamin Ricci (France) Mauro Ricci	Mercedes-AMG GT3	+5 Laps	336
6	GT3-Am	88	(France) AKKODIS ASP Team	(France) Jean-Luc Beaubelique (France) Jérôme Policand (France) Benjamin Ricci (France) Mauro Ricci	Mercedes-Benz 6.2L M159 V8	+5 Laps	336
7	992-Pro	909	(Netherlands) Red Camel-Jordans.nl	(Netherlands) Ivo Breukers (Netherlands) Luc Breukers (Netherlands) Rik Breukers (Switzerland) Fabian Danz	Porsche 992 GT3 Cup	+7 Laps	334
7	992-Pro	909	(Netherlands) Red Camel-Jordans.nl	(Netherlands) Ivo Breukers (Netherlands) Luc Breukers (Netherlands) Rik Breukers (Switzerland) Fabian Danz	Porsche 4.0 L Flat-6	+7 Laps	334
8	992-Pro	903	(Belgium) Red Ant Racing	(Belgium) Kobe de Breucker (Belgium) Ayrton Redant (Belgium) Yannick Redant	Porsche 992 GT3 Cup	+7 Laps	334
8	992-Pro	903	(Belgium) Red Ant Racing	(Belgium) Kobe de Breucker (Belgium) Ayrton Redant (Belgium) Yannick Redant	Porsche 4.0 L Flat-6	+7 Laps	334
9	992-Am	912	(Switzerland) Centri Porsche Ticino	(Italy) Max Busnelli (Italy) Francesco Fenici (Switzerland) Ivan Jacoma (Switzerland) Valerio Presezzi	Porsche 992 GT3 Cup	+8 Laps	333
9	992-Am	912	(Switzerland) Centri Porsche Ticino	(Italy) Max Busnelli (Italy) Francesco Fenici (Switzerland) Ivan Jacoma (Switzerland) Valerio Presezzi	Porsche 4.0 L Flat-6	+8 Laps	333
10	992-Pro	985	(Austria) Neuhofer Rennsport	(Germany) Michael Birkner (Austria) Felix Neuhofer (Austria) Markus Neuhofer (Austria) Martin Ragginger	Porsche 992 GT3 Cup	+8 Laps	333
10	992-Pro	985	(Austria) Neuhofer Rennsport	(Germany) Michael Birkner (Austria) Felix Neuhofer (Austria) Markus Neuhofer (Austria) Martin Ragginger	Porsche 4.0 L Flat-6	+8 Laps	333
11	992-Am	973	(Italy) Ebimotors	(Italy) Gianluca Giorgi (Italy) Paolo Gnemmi (Italy) Gianluigi Piccioli (Italy) Paolo Venerosi	Porsche 992 GT3 Cup	+8 Laps	333
11	992-Am	973	(Italy) Ebimotors	(Italy) Gianluca Giorgi (Italy) Paolo Gnemmi (Italy) Gianluigi Piccioli (Italy) Paolo Venerosi	Porsche 4.0 L Flat-6	+8 Laps	333
12	992-Pro	923	(Italy) Enrico Fulgenzi Racing	(Japan) Shintaro Akatsu (Italy) Enrico Fulgenzi (Italy) Kikko Galbiati	Porsche 992 GT3 Cup	+8 Laps	333
12	992-Pro	923	(Italy) Enrico Fulgenzi Racing	(Japan) Shintaro Akatsu (Italy) Enrico Fulgenzi (Italy) Kikko Galbiati	Porsche 4.0 L Flat-6	+8 Laps	333
13	992-Am	907	(Germany) RPM Racing	(Germany) Philip Hamprecht (Sweden) Niclas Jönsson (United States) Tracy Krohn	Porsche 992 GT3 Cup	+9 Laps	332
13	992-Am	907	(Germany) RPM Racing	(Germany) Philip Hamprecht (Sweden) Niclas Jönsson (United States) Tracy Krohn	Porsche 4.0 L Flat-6	+9 Laps	332
14	GT3-Pro	8	(Switzerland) Kessel Racing	(Italy) Alessandro Cutrera (Italy) Marco Frezza (Italy) David Fumanelli (Italy) Marco Talarico (Italy) Leonardo-Maria del Vecchio	Ferrari 488 GT3 Evo 2020	+10 Laps	331
14	GT3-Pro	8	(Switzerland) Kessel Racing	(Italy) Alessandro Cutrera (Italy) Marco Frezza (Italy) David Fumanelli (Italy) Marco Talarico (Italy) Leonardo-Maria del Vecchio	Ferrari 3.9 L Twin-Turbo V8	+10 Laps	331
15	GT3-Am	71	(Lithuania) Juta Racing	(Lithuania) Arunas Geciauskas (Lithuania) Jonas Gelžinis (Lithuania) Vytenis Gulbinas (Ukraine) Evgeny Sokolovsky	Audi R8 LMS Evo II	+10 Laps	331
15	GT3-Am	71	(Lithuania) Juta Racing	(Lithuania) Arunas Geciauskas (Lithuania) Jonas Gelžinis (Lithuania) Vytenis Gulbinas (Ukraine) Evgeny Sokolovsky	Audi 5.2L FSI V10	+10 Laps	331
16 DNF	GT3-Am	34	(Germany) Land Motorsport	(Germany) Johannes Dr. Kirchhoff (Germany) Ingo Vogler (Germany) Tim Vogler	Audi R8 LMS Evo II	+12 Laps	329
16 DNF	GT3-Am	34	(Germany) Land Motorsport	(Germany) Johannes Dr. Kirchhoff (Germany) Ingo Vogler (Germany) Tim Vogler	Audi 5.2L FSI V10	+12 Laps	329
17	992-Am	930	(Germany) HRT Performance	(Netherlands) Marcel van Berlo (Netherlands) Bob Herber	Porsche 992 GT3 Cup	+13 Laps	328
17	992-Am	930	(Germany) HRT Performance	(Netherlands) Marcel van Berlo (Netherlands) Bob Herber	Porsche 4.0 L Flat-6	+13 Laps	328
18	GT3-Pro-Am	55	(Germany) Land Motorsport	(Germany) Christopher Mies (Germany) Tim Müller (Germany) Stefan Wieninger	Audi R8 LMS Evo II	+13 Laps	328
18	GT3-Pro-Am	55	(Germany) Land Motorsport	(Germany) Christopher Mies (Germany) Tim Müller (Germany) Stefan Wieninger	Audi 5.2L FSI V10	+13 Laps	328
19	992-Pro	967	(Germany) HRT Performance	(Switzerland) Stefano Monaco (Italy) Amadeo Pampanini (Italy) Roberto Pampanini (Switzerland) Nicolas Stürzinger	Porsche 992 GT3 Cup	+14 Laps	327
19	992-Pro	967	(Germany) HRT Performance	(Switzerland) Stefano Monaco (Italy) Amadeo Pampanini (Italy) Roberto Pampanini (Switzerland) Nicolas Stürzinger	Porsche 4.0 L Flat-6	+14 Laps	327
20	992-Am	992	(Lithuania) Porsche Baltic	(Lithuania) Robertas Kupcikas (Lithuania) Andrius Šlimas (Lithuania) Tautvydas Rudokas (Lithuania) Paulius Žadeika	Porsche 992 GT3 Cup	+17 Laps	324
20	992-Am	992	(Lithuania) Porsche Baltic	(Lithuania) Robertas Kupcikas (Lithuania) Andrius Šlimas (Lithuania) Tautvydas Rudokas (Lithuania) Paulius Žadeika	Porsche 4.0 L Flat-6	+17 Laps	324
21	GT3-Am	72	(Lithuania) Juta Racing	(Lithuania) Oskaras Brazaitis (Lithuania) Egidijus Gelūnas (Lithuania) Aurimas Jablonskis (Lithuania) Audrius Navickas	Audi R8 LMS Evo	+19 Laps	322
21	GT3-Am	72	(Lithuania) Juta Racing	(Lithuania) Oskaras Brazaitis (Lithuania) Egidijus Gelūnas (Lithuania) Aurimas Jablonskis (Lithuania) Audrius Navickas	Audi 5.2L FSI V10	+19 Laps	322
22	992-Am	904	(Belgium) Red Ant Racing	(Belgium) Steve van Bellingen (Belgium) Bert Redant (Belgium) Dirk van Rompuy (Belgium) Tom van Rompuy	Porsche 992 GT3 Cup	+28 Laps	313
22	992-Am	904	(Belgium) Red Ant Racing	(Belgium) Steve van Bellingen (Belgium) Bert Redant (Belgium) Dirk van Rompuy (Belgium) Tom van Rompuy	Porsche 4.0 L Flat-6	+28 Laps	313
23	GT4	403	(South Korea) Atlas BX Motorsports	(Netherlands) Roelof Bruins (Canada) Steven Cho (South Korea) Jongkyum Kim	Mercedes-AMG GT4	+30 Laps	311
23	GT4	403	(South Korea) Atlas BX Motorsports	(Netherlands) Roelof Bruins (Canada) Steven Cho (South Korea) Jongkyum Kim	Mercedes-AMG M178 4.0 L V8	+30 Laps	311
24	GTX	701	(France) Vortex V8	(France) Lionel Amrouche (France) Philippe Bonnel (France) Philippe Gruau	Vortex 1.0 GTX	+34 Laps	307
24	GTX	701	(France) Vortex V8	(France) Lionel Amrouche (France) Philippe Bonnel (France) Philippe Gruau	Chevrolet 6.2 L V8	+34 Laps	307
25	GTX	702	(France) Vortex V8	(France) Pierre Fontaine (Switzerland) Laurent Misbach (France) Lucas Sugliano	Vortex 1.0 GTX	+37 Laps	304
25	GTX	702	(France) Vortex V8	(France) Pierre Fontaine (Switzerland) Laurent Misbach (France) Lucas Sugliano	Chevrolet 6.2 L V8	+37 Laps	304
26 DNF	GT4	416	(United Arab Emirates) Buggyra ZM Racing	(Seychelles) Aliyyah Koloc (Czech Republic) Adam Lacko (Czech Republic) David Vrsecky	Mercedes-AMG GT4	+38 Laps	303
26 DNF	GT4	416	(United Arab Emirates) Buggyra ZM Racing	(Seychelles) Aliyyah Koloc (Czech Republic) Adam Lacko (Czech Republic) David Vrsecky	Mercedes-AMG M178 4.0 L V8	+38 Laps	303
27	GT4	438	(United Kingdom) Simpson Motorsport	(United Kingdom) Carl Cavers (United Kingdom) David Holloway (Cyprus) Vasily Vladykin	BMW M4 GT4 Gen II	+44 Laps	297
27	GT4	438	(United Kingdom) Simpson Motorsport	(United Kingdom) Carl Cavers (United Kingdom) David Holloway (Cyprus) Vasily Vladykin	BMW N55 3.0 L Twin-Turbo I6	+44 Laps	297
28	TCX	251	(Sweden) Primus Racing	(Sweden) Hampus Hedin (Sweden) Peter Larsen (Sweden) Johan Rosen	BMW M2 ClubSport Racing	+46 Laps	295
28	TCX	251	(Sweden) Primus Racing	(Sweden) Hampus Hedin (Sweden) Peter Larsen (Sweden) Johan Rosen	BMW S55B30T0 3.0 L I6	+46 Laps	295
29	GT3-Am	85	(United States) CP Racing	(United States) Charles Espenlaub (United States) Shane Lewis (United States) Charles Putman	Mercedes-AMG GT3 Evo	+47 Laps	294
29	GT3-Am	85	(United States) CP Racing	(United States) Charles Espenlaub (United States) Shane Lewis (United States) Charles Putman	Mercedes-AMG M159 6.2 L V8	+47 Laps	294
30	GTX	720	(Lithuania) RD Signs – Siauliai Racing Team	(Lithuania) Audrius Butkevicius (Italy) Nicola Michelon (Lithuania) Paulius Paskevicius	Lamborghini Huracán Super Trofeo Evo 2	+48 Laps	293
30	GTX	720	(Lithuania) RD Signs – Siauliai Racing Team	(Lithuania) Audrius Butkevicius (Italy) Nicola Michelon (Lithuania) Paulius Paskevicius	Lamborghini 5.2 L V10	+48 Laps	293
31	TC	331	(Switzerland) Hofor Racing by Bonk Motorsport	(Germany) Michael Bonk (Switzerland) Martin Kroll (Germany) Felix Partl (Germany) Max Partl	BMW M2 ClubSport Racing	+48 Laps	293
31	TC	331	(Switzerland) Hofor Racing by Bonk Motorsport	(Germany) Michael Bonk (Switzerland) Martin Kroll (Germany) Felix Partl (Germany) Max Partl	BMW S55B30T0 3.0 L I6	+48 Laps	293
32	GTX	719	(Germany) 9und11 Racing	(Germany) Georg Goder (Germany) Leonard Oehme (Germany) Ralf Oehme (Germany) Martin Schlüter	Porsche 991 GT3 II Cup MR	+58 Laps	283
32	GTX	719	(Germany) 9und11 Racing	(Germany) Georg Goder (Germany) Leonard Oehme (Germany) Ralf Oehme (Germany) Martin Schlüter	Porsche 4.0 L Flat-6	+58 Laps	283
33 DNF	992-Am	928	(Germany) NKPP by HRT Performance	(Netherlands) Gijs Bessem (Netherlands) Harry Hilders	Porsche 992 GT3 Cup	+76 Laps	265
33 DNF	992-Am	928	(Germany) NKPP by HRT Performance	(Netherlands) Gijs Bessem (Netherlands) Harry Hilders	Porsche 4.0 L Flat-6	+76 Laps	265
34	TCR	147	(Italy) Aikoa Racing	(Italy) Nicola Baldan (Italy) Filippo Barberi (Italy) Francesco Cardone (Argentina) Franco Girolami (Italy) Sandro Pelatti	Audi RS 3 LMS TCR (2017)	+86 Laps	255
34	TCR	147	(Italy) Aikoa Racing	(Italy) Nicola Baldan (Italy) Filippo Barberi (Italy) Francesco Cardone (Argentina) Franco Girolami (Italy) Sandro Pelatti	Volkswagen EA888 2.0 L I4	+86 Laps	255
35 DNF	TC	332	(Switzerland) Hofor Racing by Bonk Motorsport	(Germany) Hermann Bock (Germany) Michael Bonk (Switzerland) Martin Kroll (Germany) Volker Piepmeyer	BMW M2 ClubSport Racing	+105 Laps	236
35 DNF	TC	332	(Switzerland) Hofor Racing by Bonk Motorsport	(Germany) Hermann Bock (Germany) Michael Bonk (Switzerland) Martin Kroll (Germany) Volker Piepmeyer	BMW S55B30T0 3.0 L I6	+105 Laps	236
36	TCX	215	(France) SK Racing	(France) Jérôme Da Costa (France) Franck Eburderie (France) Alain Ferté (France) Franco Lemma	Ligier JS2 R	+105 Laps	236
36	TCX	215	(France) SK Racing	(France) Jérôme Da Costa (France) Franck Eburderie (France) Alain Ferté (France) Franco Lemma	Ford Cyclone 3.7 L V6	+105 Laps	236
37 DNF	GT3-Am	90	(Spain) E2P Racing	(Spain) Pablo Burguera (Spain) Javier Morcillo (Spain) Antonio Sainero	Porsche 911 GT3 R (991.2)	+124 Laps	217
37 DNF	GT3-Am	90	(Spain) E2P Racing	(Spain) Pablo Burguera (Spain) Javier Morcillo (Spain) Antonio Sainero	Porsche 4.0 L Flat-6	+124 Laps	217
Ret	SP4	600	(Germany) Herberth Motorsport	(Switzerland) Daniel Allemann (Germany) Ralf Bohn (Germany) Alfred Renauer (Germany) Robert Renauer	Porsche 911 GT3 R (992)	+264 Laps	77
Ret	SP4	600	(Germany) Herberth Motorsport	(Switzerland) Daniel Allemann (Germany) Ralf Bohn (Germany) Alfred Renauer (Germany) Robert Renauer	Porsche 4.2 L Flat-6	+264 Laps	77
Ret	GTX	726	(Italy) Lotus PB Racing	(Italy) Stefano D'Aste (Monaco) Luca Littardi (Italy) Costantino Peroni (Monaco) Vito Utzieri (Italy) Pietro Vergnano	Lotus Exige V6 Cup R	+317 Laps	24
Ret	GTX	726	(Italy) Lotus PB Racing	(Italy) Stefano D'Aste (Monaco) Luca Littardi (Italy) Costantino Peroni (Monaco) Vito Utzieri (Italy) Pietro Vergnano	Toyota 3.5 L V6	+317 Laps	24
Ret	GT3-Pro-Am	91	(Germany) Herberth Motorsport	(Switzerland) Daniel Allemann (Germany) Ralf Bohn (Germany) Alfred Renauer (Germany) Robert Renauer	Porsche 911 GT3 R (991.2)	+318 Laps	23
Ret	GT3-Pro-Am	91	(Germany) Herberth Motorsport	(Switzerland) Daniel Allemann (Germany) Ralf Bohn (Germany) Alfred Renauer (Germany) Robert Renauer	Porsche 4.0 L Flat-6	+318 Laps	23

== Notes ==
24H GT Series
Previous race: None	2023 season	Next race: 12 Hours of Spa-Francorchamps

24H TCE Series
Previous race: None	2023 season	Next race: 12 Hours of Spa-Francorchamps
