= 2023 24H TCE Series =

Touring Car Endurance Series

The 2023 24H Touring Car Endurance Series powered by Hankook was the eighth and final season of the Touring Car Endurance Series (TCES). Creventic is the organiser and promoter of the series. The races are contested with TCR Touring Cars, TCX cars and TC cars.

== Calendar ==
| Round | Event | Circuit | Date |
|---|---|---|---|
| 1 | 12 Hours of Mugello | Mugello Circuit, Scarperia e San Piero, Italy | 25–26 March |
| 2 | 12 Hours of Spa-Francorchamps | Circuit de Spa-Francorchamps, Stavelot, Belgium | 6–7 May |
| 3 | 12 Hours of Monza | Autodromo Nazionale di Monza, Monza, Italy | 10-11 June |
| 4 | 6 Hours Qualifying of Estoril | Circuito do Estoril, Estoril, Portugal | 7–8 July |
| 4 | 12 Hours of Estoril | Circuito do Estoril, Estoril, Portugal | 7–8 July |
| 5 | 24 Hours of Barcelona | Circuit de Barcelona-Catalunya, Montmeló, Spain | 15–17 September |

== Teams and drivers ==
| Team | Car | Engine | No. | Drivers | Rounds |
TCR
| (Denmark) Holmgaard Motorsport | Cupra León Competición TCR | Volkswagen EA888 2.0 L I4 | 102 | (Norway) Roy Edland | 2–3, 5 |
| (Denmark) Holmgaard Motorsport | Cupra León Competición TCR | Volkswagen EA888 2.0 L I4 | 102 | (Denmark) Jonas Holmgaard | 2–3, 5 |
| (Denmark) Holmgaard Motorsport | Cupra León Competición TCR | Volkswagen EA888 2.0 L I4 | 102 | (Denmark) Magnus Holmgaard | 2–3, 5 |
| (Denmark) Holmgaard Motorsport | Cupra León Competición TCR | Volkswagen EA888 2.0 L I4 | 102 | (Denmark) Martin Vedel Mortensen | 2–3 |
| (Denmark) Holmgaard Motorsport | Cupra León Competición TCR | Volkswagen EA888 2.0 L I4 | 102 | (Belgium) Tom Cloet | 5 |
| (Denmark) Holmgaard Motorsport | Cupra León Competición TCR | Volkswagen EA888 2.0 L I4 | 102 | (Canada) Michel Sallenbach | 5 |
| (Switzerland) Wolf-Power Racing | Audi RS 3 LMS TCR (2021) | Volkswagen EA888 2.0 L I4 | 117 | (Germany) Marcus Menden | 2 |
| (Switzerland) Wolf-Power Racing | Audi RS 3 LMS TCR (2021) | Volkswagen EA888 2.0 L I4 | 117 | (United Kingdom) Robert Huff | 2 |
| (Switzerland) Wolf-Power Racing | Audi RS 3 LMS TCR (2021) | Volkswagen EA888 2.0 L I4 | 121 | (Switzerland) Jasmin Preisig | 2, 5 |
| (Switzerland) Wolf-Power Racing | Audi RS 3 LMS TCR (2021) | Volkswagen EA888 2.0 L I4 | 121 | (Latvia) Ivan Vallers | 2, 5 |
| (Switzerland) Wolf-Power Racing | Audi RS 3 LMS TCR (2021) | Volkswagen EA888 2.0 L I4 | 121 | (Switzerland) Miklas Born | 5 |
| (Switzerland) Wolf-Power Racing | Audi RS 3 LMS TCR (2021) | Volkswagen EA888 2.0 L I4 | 121 | (Italy) Roberto Ferri | 5 |
| (Spain) Rail Equip by Totcar Sport | Cupra León TCR | Volkswagen EA888 2.0 L I4 | 123 | (Spain) Jorge Belloc Diaz | 2 |
| (Spain) Rail Equip by Totcar Sport | Cupra León TCR | Volkswagen EA888 2.0 L I4 | 123 | (Spain) Jorge Belloc Ruiz | 2 |
| (Spain) Rail Equip by Totcar Sport | Cupra León TCR | Volkswagen EA888 2.0 L I4 | 123 | (Spain) Álvaro Rodríguez Sastre | 2 |
| (Netherlands) Bas Koeten Racing | Cupra León TCR | Volkswagen EA888 2.0 L I4 | 125 | (Netherlands) Christiaan Frankenhout | 5 |
| (Netherlands) Bas Koeten Racing | Cupra León TCR | Volkswagen EA888 2.0 L I4 | 125 | (Netherlands) Bert Mets | 5 |
| (Netherlands) Bas Koeten Racing | Cupra León TCR | Volkswagen EA888 2.0 L I4 | 125 | (Netherlands) Bob Stevens | 5 |
| (Netherlands) Bas Koeten Racing | Cupra León TCR | Volkswagen EA888 2.0 L I4 | 125 | (Netherlands) Jos Stevens | 5 |
| (Italy) Aikoa Racing | Audi RS 3 LMS TCR (2017) | Volkswagen EA888 2.0 L I4 | 147 | (Italy) Nicola Baldan | 1 |
| (Italy) Aikoa Racing | Audi RS 3 LMS TCR (2017) | Volkswagen EA888 2.0 L I4 | 147 | (Italy) Filippo Barberi | 1 |
| (Italy) Aikoa Racing | Audi RS 3 LMS TCR (2017) | Volkswagen EA888 2.0 L I4 | 147 | (Italy) Francesco Cardone | 1 |
| (Italy) Aikoa Racing | Audi RS 3 LMS TCR (2017) | Volkswagen EA888 2.0 L I4 | 147 | (Argentina) Franco Girolami | 1 |
| (Italy) Aikoa Racing | Audi RS 3 LMS TCR (2017) | Volkswagen EA888 2.0 L I4 | 147 | (Italy) Sandro Pelatti | 1 |
TCX
| (France) SK Racing | Ligier JS2 R | Ford Cyclone 3.7 L V6 | 215 | (France) Jérôme Dacosta | 1 |
| (France) SK Racing | Ligier JS2 R | Ford Cyclone 3.7 L V6 | 215 | (France) Franck Eburderie | 1 |
| (France) SK Racing | Ligier JS2 R | Ford Cyclone 3.7 L V6 | 215 | (France) Alain Ferté | 1 |
| (France) SK Racing | Ligier JS2 R | Ford Cyclone 3.7 L V6 | 215 | (France) Franco Lemma | 1 |
| (Germany) SRS Team Sorg Rennsport | Porsche 718 Cayman GT4 Clubsport | Porsche 3.8 L Flat-6 | 227 | (Germany) Heiko Eichenberg | 2 |
| (Germany) SRS Team Sorg Rennsport | Porsche 718 Cayman GT4 Clubsport | Porsche 3.8 L Flat-6 | 227 | (Switzerland) Patrik Grütter | 2 |
| (Germany) SRS Team Sorg Rennsport | Porsche 718 Cayman GT4 Clubsport | Porsche 3.8 L Flat-6 | 227 | (Austria) Seppi Stigler | 2 |
| (Germany) SRS Team Sorg Rennsport | Porsche 718 Cayman GT4 Clubsport | Porsche 3.8 L Flat-6 | 227 | (Austria) Bernhard Wagner | 2 |
| (Netherlands) Roma Racing by BMW Team Van Der Horst | BMW M2 ClubSport Racing | BMW S55B30T0 3.0 L I6 | 245 | (Belgium) Nicolas Koninckx | 2 |
| (Netherlands) Roma Racing by BMW Team Van Der Horst | BMW M2 ClubSport Racing | BMW S55B30T0 3.0 L I6 | 245 | (Italy) Mauro Mercuri | 2 |
| (Netherlands) Roma Racing by BMW Team Van Der Horst | BMW M2 ClubSport Racing | BMW S55B30T0 3.0 L I6 | 245 | (Netherlands) Paul Roosen | 2 |
| (Sweden) Primus Racing | BMW M2 ClubSport Racing | BMW S55B30T0 3.0 L I6 | 251 | (Sweden) Hampus Hedin | 1 |
| (Sweden) Primus Racing | BMW M2 ClubSport Racing | BMW S55B30T0 3.0 L I6 | 251 | (Sweden) Peter Larsen | 1 |
| (Sweden) Primus Racing | BMW M2 ClubSport Racing | BMW S55B30T0 3.0 L I6 | 251 | (Sweden) Johan Rosen | 1 |
TC
| (Switzerland) Hofor Racing by Bonk Motorsport | BMW M2 ClubSport Racing | BMW S55B30T0 3.0 L I6 | 331 | (Germany) Michael Bonk | 1–2 |
| (Switzerland) Hofor Racing by Bonk Motorsport | BMW M2 ClubSport Racing | BMW S55B30T0 3.0 L I6 | 331 | (Switzerland) Martin Kroll | 1–2 |
| (Switzerland) Hofor Racing by Bonk Motorsport | BMW M2 ClubSport Racing | BMW S55B30T0 3.0 L I6 | 331 | (Germany) Felix Partl | 1 |
| (Switzerland) Hofor Racing by Bonk Motorsport | BMW M2 ClubSport Racing | BMW S55B30T0 3.0 L I6 | 331 | (Germany) Max Partl | 1 |
| (Switzerland) Hofor Racing by Bonk Motorsport | BMW M2 ClubSport Racing | BMW S55B30T0 3.0 L I6 | 331 | (Germany) Alexander Schmidt | 2 |
| (Switzerland) Hofor Racing by Bonk Motorsport | BMW M2 ClubSport Racing | BMW S55B30T0 3.0 L I6 | 332 | (Germany) Hermann Bock | 1 |
| (Switzerland) Hofor Racing by Bonk Motorsport | BMW M2 ClubSport Racing | BMW S55B30T0 3.0 L I6 | 332 | (Germany) Michael Bonk | 1 |
| (Switzerland) Hofor Racing by Bonk Motorsport | BMW M2 ClubSport Racing | BMW S55B30T0 3.0 L I6 | 332 | (Switzerland) Martin Kroll | 1 |
| (Switzerland) Hofor Racing by Bonk Motorsport | BMW M2 ClubSport Racing | BMW S55B30T0 3.0 L I6 | 332 | (Germany) Volker Piepmeyer | 1 |

== Race results ==
Bold indicates overall winner.

| Event | | Circuit | TCR Winners | TCX Winners | TC Winners | Report |
|---|---|---|---|---|---|---|
| 1 | | (Italy) Mugello Circuit | (Italy) No. 147 Aikoa Racing | **(Sweden) No. 251 Primus Racing** | (Switzerland) No. 331 Hofor Racing by Bonk Motorsport | Report |
| 1 | | (Italy) Mugello Circuit | (Italy) Nicola Baldan (Italy) Filippo Barberi (Italy) Francesco Cardone (Argentina) Franco Girolami (Italy) Sandro Pelatti | **(Sweden) Hampus Hedin** **(Sweden) Peter Larsen** **(Sweden) Johan Rosen** | (Germany) Michael Bonk (Switzerland) Martin Kroll (Germany) Felix Partl (Germany) Max Partl | Report |
| 2 | | (Belgium) Circuit de Spa-Francorchamps | **(Denmark) No. 102 Holmgaard Motorsport** | (Germany) No. 227 SRS Team Sorg Rennsport | (Switzerland) No. 331 Hofor Racing by Bonk Motorsport | Report |
| 2 | | (Belgium) Circuit de Spa-Francorchamps | **(Norway) Roy Edland** **(Denmark) Jonas Holmgaard** **(Denmark) Magnus Holmgaard** **(Denmark) Martin Vedel Mortensen** | (Germany) Heiko Eichenberg (Switzerland) Patrik Grütter (Austria) Seppi Stigler (Austria) Bernhard Wagner | (Germany) Michael Bonk (Switzerland) Martin Kroll (Germany) Alexander Schmidt | Report |
| 3 | | (Italy) Autodromo Nazionale di Monza | **(Denmark) No. 102 Holmgaard Motorsport** | No entries | No entries | Report |
| 3 | | (Italy) Autodromo Nazionale di Monza | **(Norway) Roy Edland** **(Denmark) Jonas Holmgaard** **(Denmark) Magnus Holmgaard** **(Denmark) Martin Vedel Mortensen** | No entries | No entries | Report |
| 4 | QR | (Portugal) Circuito do Estoril | No entries | No entries | No entries | Report |
| 4 | R | (Portugal) Circuito do Estoril | No entries | No entries | No entries | Report |
| 5 | | (Spain) Circuit de Barcelona-Catalunya | **(Switzerland) No. 121 Wolf-Power Racing** | No entries | No entries | Report |
| 5 | | (Spain) Circuit de Barcelona-Catalunya | **(Switzerland) Miklas Born** **(Italy) Roberto Ferri** **(Switzerland) Jasmin Preisig** **(Latvia) Ivan Vallers** | No entries | No entries | Report |

=== Championship standings ===
| Position | **1st** | **2nd** | **3rd** | **4th** | **5th** | **6th** | **7th** | **8th** | **9th** | **10th** | **11th** | **12th** | **13th** | **14th** | **15th** |
| 12hrs Races Barcelona at finish | 40 | 36 | 32 | 28 | 24 | 20 | 18 | 16 | 14 | 12 | 10 | 8 | 6 | 4 | 2 |
| Estoril QR Barcelona at 12hrs | 20 | 18 | 16 | 14 | 12 | 10 | 9 | 8 | 7 | 6 | 5 | 4 | 3 | 2 | 1 |

==== Teams' Overall ====
| Pos. | Team | Class | (Italy) MUG | (Belgium) SPA | (Italy) MNZ | (Portugal) EST | (Spain) BAR | | Pts. |
|---|---|---|---|---|---|---|---|---|---|
| 1 | (Denmark) No. 102 Holmgaard Motorsport | TCR | | 28 | **16** | | 25 | **24** | 136 |
| 2 | (Switzerland) No. 121 Wolf-Power Racing | TCR | | 29 | | | 29 | 22 | 94 |
| 3 | (Switzerland) No. 331 Hofor Racing by Bonk Motorsport | TC | **31** | **45†** | | | | | 80 |
| 4 | (Netherlands) No. 125 Bas Koeten Racing | TCR | | | | | 31 | 36† | 48 |
| 5 | (Italy) No. 147 Aikoa Racing | TCR | **34** | | | | | | 40 |
| 6 | (Germany) No. 227 SRS Team Sorg Rennsport | TCX | | **33** | | | | | 40 |
| 7 | (Sweden) No. 251 Primus Racing | TCX | 28 | | | | | | 40 |
| 8 | (France) No. 215 SK Racing | TCX | **36** | | | | | | 36 |
| 9 | (Netherlands) No. 245 Roma Racing by BMW Team Van Der Horst | TCX | | 39 | | | | | 36 |
| 10 | (Switzerland) No. 332 Hofor Racing by Bonk Motorsport | TC | 35† | | | | | | 40 |
| 11 | (Spain) No. 123 Rail Equip by Totcar Sport | TCR | | 32 | | | | | 32 |
| | (Switzerland) No. 117 Wolf-Power Racing | TCR | | **Ret** | | | | | 0 |
| Pos. | Team | Class | (Italy) MUG | (Belgium) SPA | (Italy) MNZ | (Portugal) EST | (Spain) BAR | | Pts. |

| Colour | Result |
|---|---|
| Gold | Winner |
| Silver | Second place |
| Bronze | Third place |
| Green | Points classification |
| Blue | Non-points classification |
| Blue | Non-classified finish (NC) |
| Purple | Retired, not classified (Ret) |
| Red | Did not qualify (DNQ) |
| Red | Did not pre-qualify (DNPQ) |
| Black | Disqualified (DSQ) |
| White | Did not start (DNS) |
| White | Withdrew (WD) |
| White | Race cancelled (C) |
| Blank | Did not practice (DNP) |
| Blank | Did not arrive (DNA) |
| Blank | Excluded (EX) |

**Bold** – Pole
Italics – Fastest Lap

† – Drivers did not finish the race, but were classified as they completed over 60% of the class winner's race distance.

==== TCR Drivers' ====
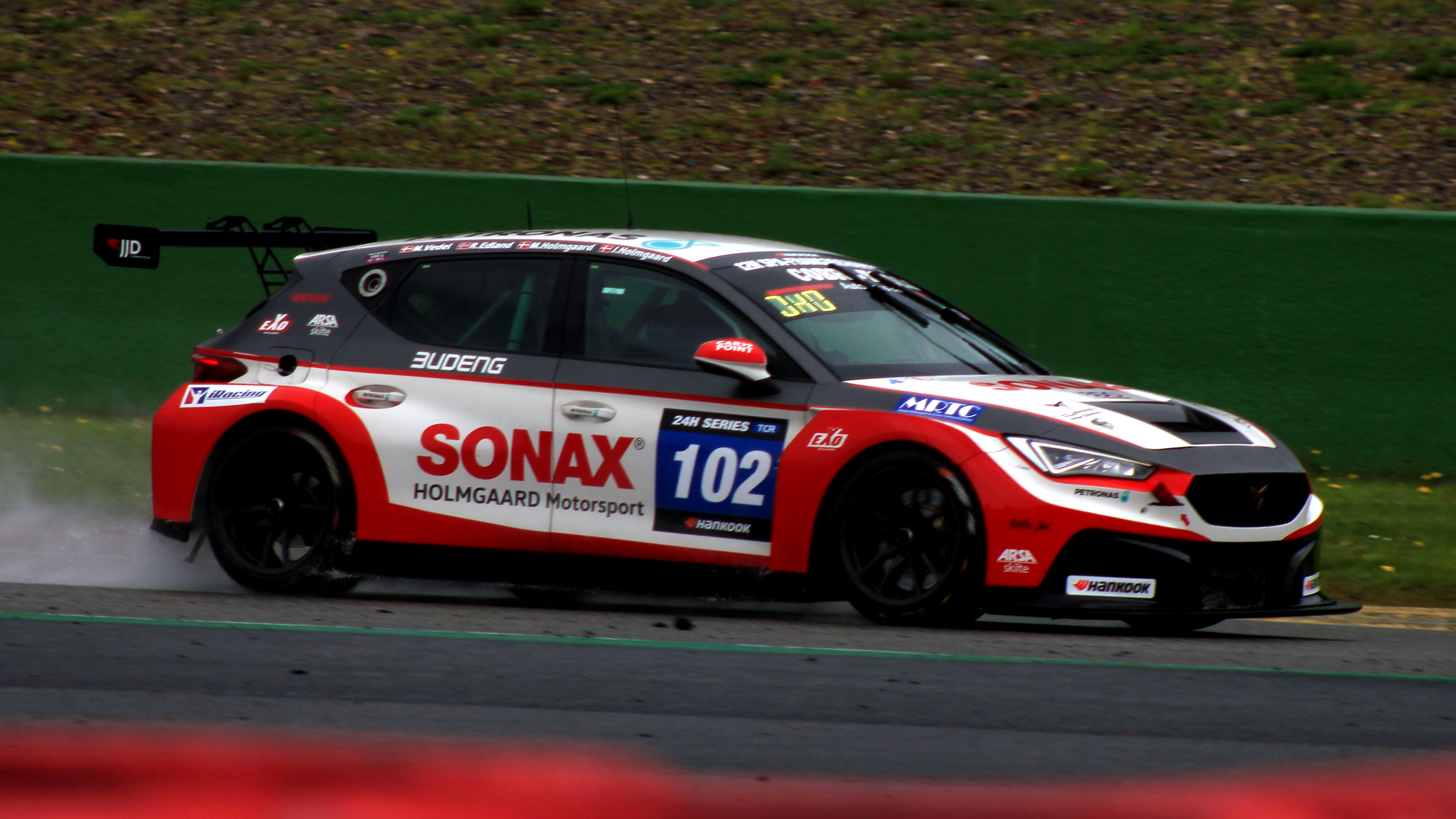
Roy Edland, Jonas Holmgaard, Magnus Holmgaard, Martin Vedel Mortensen and Holmgaard Motorsport lead the TCR standings.

| Pos. | Drivers | Team | (Italy) MUG | (Belgium) SPA | (Italy) MNZ | (Portugal) EST | (Spain) BAR | | Pts. |
|---|---|---|---|---|---|---|---|---|---|
| 1 | (Norway) Roy Edland (Denmark) Jonas Holmgaard (Denmark) Magnus Holmgaard | (Denmark) No. 102 Holmgaard Motorsport | | 28 | **16** | | 25 | **24** | 136 |
| 2 | (Switzerland) Jasmin Preisig (Latvia) Ivan Vallers | (Switzerland) No. 121 Wolf-Power Racing | | 29 | | | 29 | 22 | 94 |
| 3 | (Denmark) Martin Vedel Mortensen | (Denmark) No. 102 Holmgaard Motorsport | | 28 | **16** | | | | 80 |
Ineligible for championship
| - | (Switzerland) Miklas Born (Italy) Roberto Ferri | (Switzerland) No. 121 Wolf-Power Racing | | | | | 29 | 22 | (58) |
| - | (Belgium) Tom Cloet (Canada) Michel Sallenbach | (Denmark) No. 102 Holmgaard Motorsport | | | | | 25 | **24** | (56) |
| - | (Netherlands) Christiaan Frankenhout (Netherlands) Bert Mets (Netherlands) Bob Stevens (Netherlands) Jos Stevens | (Netherlands) No. 125 Bas Koeten Racing | | | | | 31 | 36† | (48) |
| - | (Italy) Nicola Baldan (Italy) Filippo Barberi (Italy) Francesco Cardone (Argentina) Franco Girolami (Italy) Sandro Pelatti | (Italy) No. 147 Aikoa Racing | **34** | | | | | | (40) |
| - | (Spain) Jorge Belloc Diaz (Spain) Jorge Belloc Ruiz (Spain) Álvaro Rodríguez Sastre | (Spain) No. 123 Rail Equip by Totcar Sport | | 32 | | | | | (32) |
| | (United Kingdom) Robert Huff (Germany) Marcus Menden | (Switzerland) No. 117 Wolf-Power Racing | | **Ret** | | | | | 0 |
| Pos. | Drivers | Team | (Italy) MUG | (Belgium) SPA | (Italy) MNZ | (Portugal) EST | (Spain) BAR | | Pts. |

==== TCR Teams' ====
| Pos. | Team | (Italy) MUG | (Belgium) SPA | (Italy) MNZ | (Portugal) EST | (Spain) BAR | | Pts. |
|---|---|---|---|---|---|---|---|---|
| 1 | (Denmark) No. 102 Holmgaard Motorsport | | 28 | **16** | | 25 | **24** | 136 |
| 2 | (Switzerland) No. 121 Wolf-Power Racing | | 29 | | | 29 | 22 | 94 |
Ineligible for championship
| - | (Netherlands) No. 125 Bas Koeten Racing | | | | | 31 | 36† | (48) |
| - | (Italy) No. 147 Aikoa Racing | **34** | | | | | | (40) |
| - | (Spain) No. 123 Rail Equip by Totcar Sport | | 32 | | | | | (32) |
| | (Switzerland) No. 117 Wolf-Power Racing | | **Ret** | | | | | 0 |
| Pos. | Team | (Italy) MUG | (Belgium) SPA | (Italy) MNZ | (Portugal) EST | (Spain) BAR | | Pts. |

==== TCX Drivers' ====
None of TCX drivers entered enough rounds to be eligible for championship.

| Pos. | Drivers | Team | (Italy) MUG | (Belgium) SPA | (Italy) MNZ | (Portugal) EST | (Spain) BAR | Pts. |
|---|---|---|---|---|---|---|---|---|
| - | (Sweden) Hampus Hedin (Sweden) Peter Larsen (Sweden) Johan Rosen | (Sweden) No. 251 Primus Racing | 28 | | | | | (40) |
| - | (Germany) Heiko Eichenberg (Switzerland) Patrik Grütter (Austria) Seppi Stigler (Austria) Bernhard Wagner | (Germany) No. 227 SRS Team Sorg Rennsport | | **33** | | | | (40) |
| - | (France) Jérôme Dacosta (France) Franck Eburderie (France) Alain Ferté (France) Franco Lemma | (France) No. 215 SK Racing | **36** | | | | | (36) |
| - | (Belgium) Nicolas Koninckx (Italy) Mauro Mercuri (Netherlands) Paul Roosen | (Netherlands) No. 245 Roma Racing by BMW Team Van Der Horst | | 39 | | | | (36) |
| Pos. | Drivers | Team | (Italy) MUG | (Belgium) SPA | (Italy) MNZ | (Portugal) EST | (Spain) BAR | Pts. |

==== TCX Teams' ====
None of TCX teams entered enough rounds to be eligible for championship.

| Pos. | Team | (Italy) MUG | (Belgium) SPA | (Italy) MNZ | (Portugal) EST | (Spain) BAR | Pts. |
|---|---|---|---|---|---|---|---|
| - | (Sweden) No. 251 Primus Racing | 28 | | | | | (40) |
| - | (Germany) No. 227 SRS Team Sorg Rennsport | | **33** | | | | (40) |
| - | (France) No. 215 SK Racing | **36** | | | | | (36) |
| - | (Netherlands) No. 245 Roma Racing by BMW Team Van Der Horst | | 39 | | | | (36) |
| Pos. | Team | (Italy) MUG | (Belgium) SPA | (Italy) MNZ | (Portugal) EST | (Spain) BAR | Pts. |

==== TC Drivers' ====
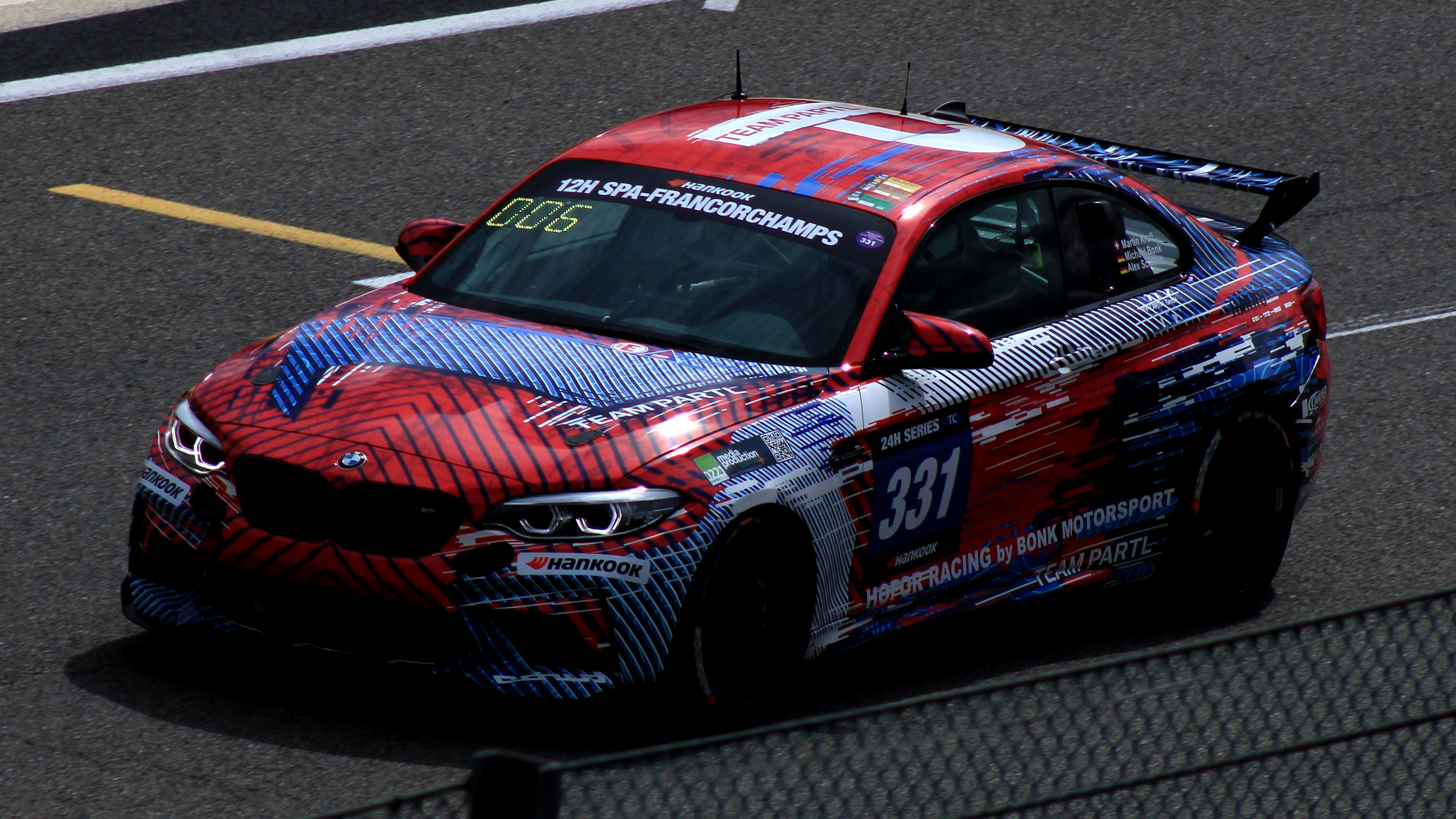
Michael Bonk, Martin Kroll and Hofor Racing by Bonk Motorsport lead the TC standings.

| Pos. | Drivers | Team | (Italy) MUG | (Belgium) SPA | (Italy) MNZ | (Portugal) EST | (Spain) BAR | Pts. |
|---|---|---|---|---|---|---|---|---|
| 1 | (Germany) Michael Bonk (Switzerland) Martin Kroll | (Switzerland) No. 331 Hofor Racing by Bonk Motorsport | **31** | **45†** | | | | 80 |
Ineligible for championship
| - | (Germany) Max Partl (Germany) Felix Partl | (Switzerland) No. 331 Hofor Racing by Bonk Motorsport | **31** | | | | | (40) |
| - | (Germany) Alexander Schmidt | (Switzerland) No. 331 Hofor Racing by Bonk Motorsport | | **45†** | | | | (40) |
| - | (Germany) Hermann Bock (Germany) Volker Piepmeyer | (Switzerland) No. 332 Hofor Racing by Bonk Motorsport | 35† | | | | | (36) |
| Pos. | Drivers | Team | (Italy) MUG | (Belgium) SPA | (Italy) MNZ | (Portugal) EST | (Spain) BAR | Pts. |

==== TC Teams' ====
| Pos. | Team | (Italy) MUG | (Belgium) SPA | (Italy) MNZ | (Portugal) EST | (Spain) BAR | Pts. |
|---|---|---|---|---|---|---|---|
| 1 | (Switzerland) No. 331 Hofor Racing by Bonk Motorsport | **31** | **45†** | | | | 80 |
Ineligible for championship
| - | (Switzerland) No. 332 Hofor Racing by Bonk Motorsport | 35† | | | | | (36) |
| Pos. | Team | (Italy) MUG | (Belgium) SPA | (Italy) MNZ | (Portugal) EST | (Spain) BAR | Pts. |
