= Fabian Schiller =

German racing driver

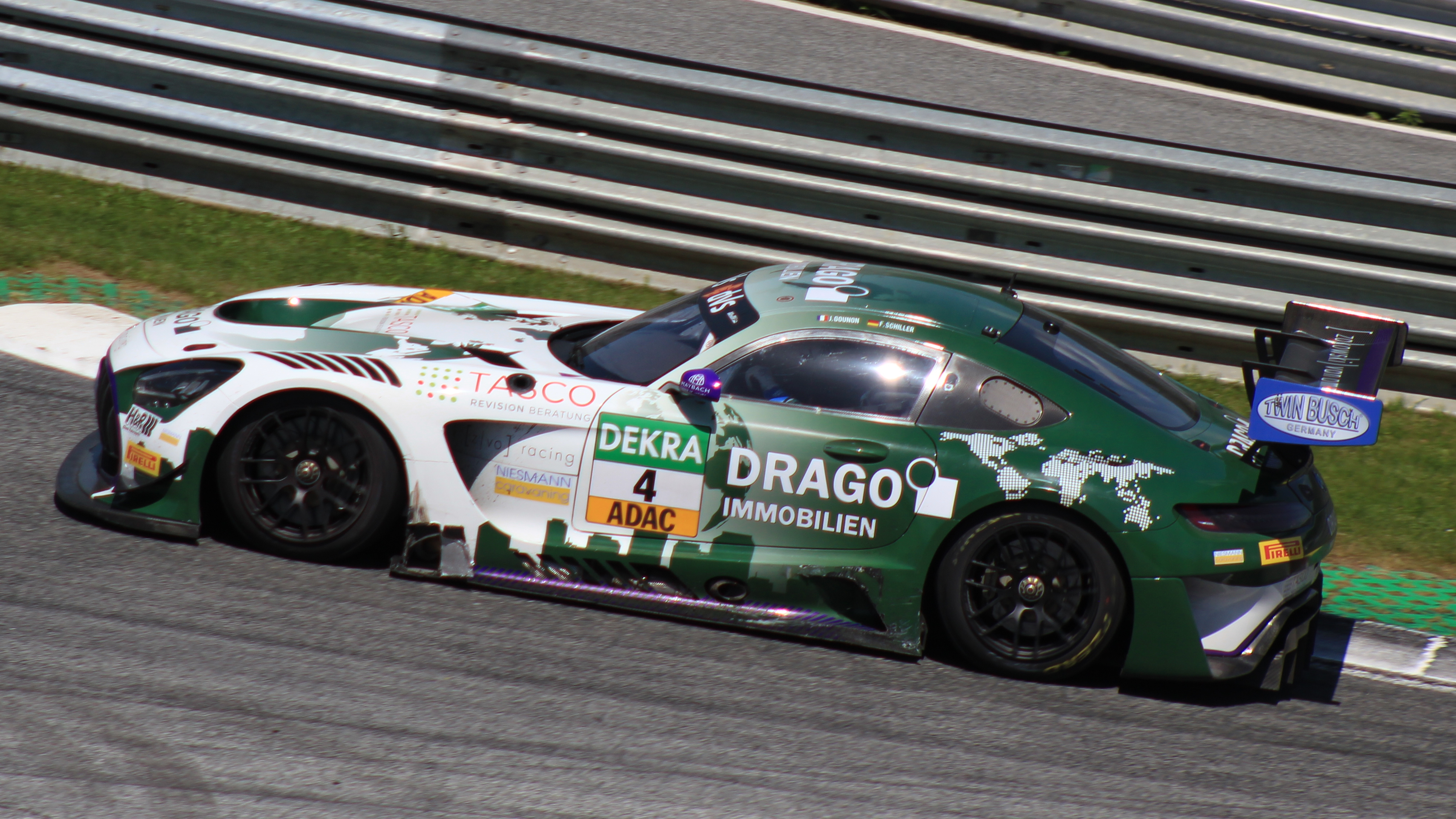
- Schiller in 2022
- Nationality: (Germany) German
- Born: 24 May 1997 (age 29) Troisdorf, Germany

Nürburgring Endurance Series career
- Debut season: 2017
- Current team: Mercedes-AMG Team GetSpeed
- Categorisation: FIA Silver (until 2022); FIA Gold (2023–)
- Car number: 2
- Former teams: HTP Motorsport

Previous series
- 2013–2014 2017–2020: ADAC Formel Masters; GT World Challenge Europe

Championship titles
- 2016 2016 2017: Renault Sport Trophy – AM Class; Renault Sport Trophy – Endurance Trophy; Blancpain GT Series Sprint Cup – Silver Class
Medal record
GT3
Representing Germany
FIA Motorsport Games
| Silver medal – second place | 2022 Le Castellet | GT Cup |

Fabian Schiller (born 24 May 1997) is a German racing driver who currently competes in GT World Challenge Europe. A Mercedes-AMG factory driver since 2023, he achieved his biggest success winning the 2026 24 Hours of Nürburgring.

== Career ==
=== Junior formula ===
Schiller began his racing career in karting at the age of 12, competing in the ADAC Kart Masters series. In 2012, he began competing in single-seater formula cars, taking part in the Formula BMW Talent Cup. The following season, Schiller stepped up to compete in the ADAC Formel Masters championship, competing for the Schiller Motorsport team run by his father and uncle. He would finish 11th in his first season in the competition, scoring his first victory at the Lausitzring. After two years of competition and three race victories in the series, Schiller graduated to the FIA Formula 3 European Championship, signing with Team West-Tec for the 2015 season. However, with three races remaining in the season, he was removed from his seat due to unsatisfactory performances.

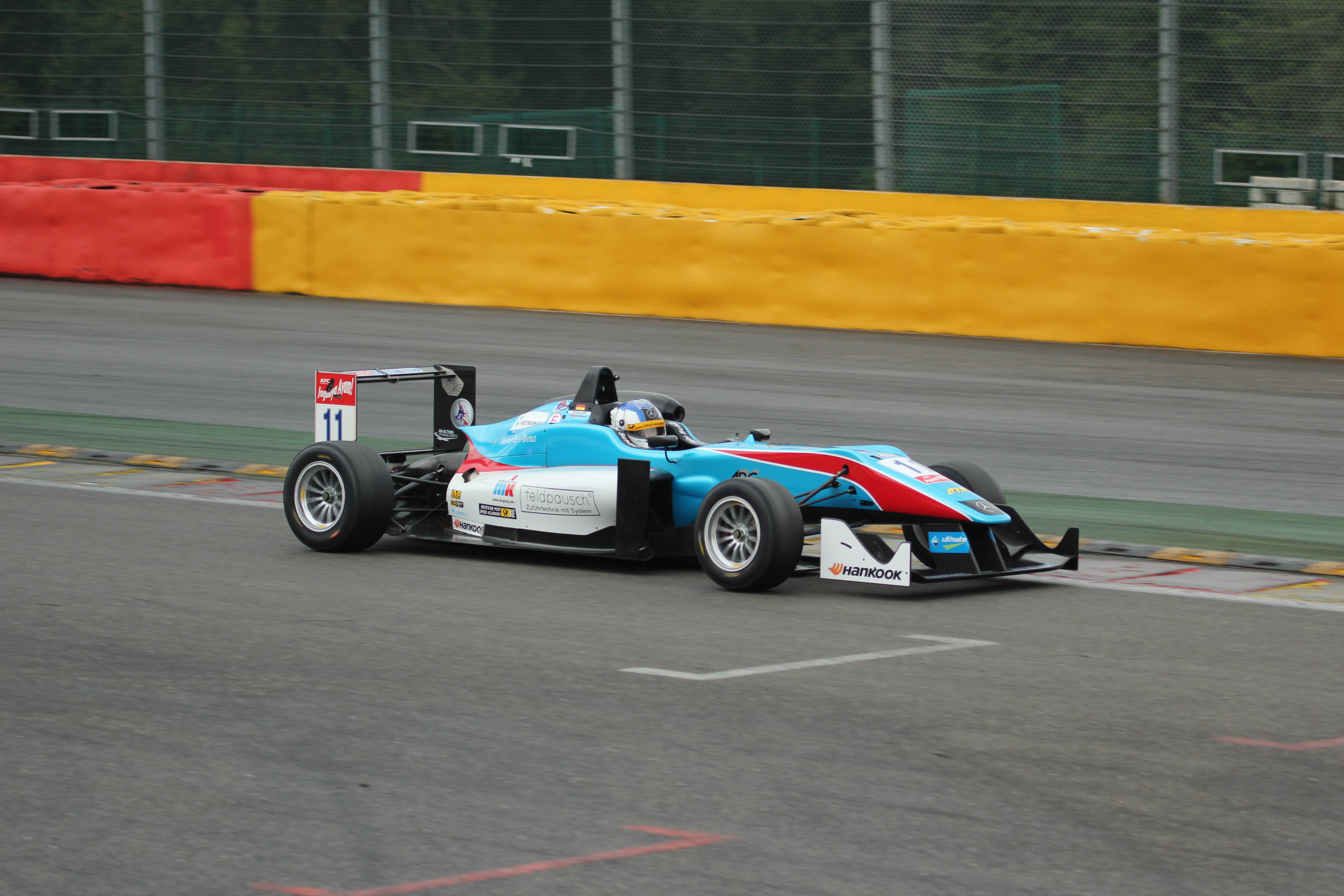
Schiller competing in Formula 3 at Spa in 2015

=== Sports cars ===
In March 2016, Schiller joined Marc VDS Racing Team for the 2016 edition of the Renault Sport Trophy. Schiller found much success over the course of the season, winning both the individual AM class championship and the Endurance Trophy alongside co-driver Markus Palttala. That same year, Schiller made his first appearance at the 24 Hours of Nürburgring, competing in the SP7 class. The team would finish sixth in class, completing 85 of the leader's 124 laps.

At the end of 2016, Schiller announced that he'd be competing for Race Performance in the LMP2 class of the Asian Le Mans Series. After winning his first race in the series at Fuji, the team finished fourth at Buriram and second at Sepang, finishing fourth in points. For 2017, Schiller raced in the Blancpain GT Series Sprint Cup, winning the Silver Cup title with co-driver Jules Szymkowiak.

Two years later, Schiller made his debut in the IMSA SportsCar Championship at the 2019 24 Hours of Daytona, driving for P1 Motorsports. After retiring, the entry finished 19th in class. Two seasons later, Schiller returned to the series, competing with DragonSpeed in the LMP2 class. The team finished on the podium in class, four laps behind the second-placed Tower Motorsport by Starworks entry.

Schiller embarked on two full-time programs in 2022, taking part in the ADAC GT Masters and GT World Challenge Europe Endurance Cup in Mercedes-AMG machinery. For the ADAC GT Masters season, Schiller teamed with Jules Gounon, driving for Drago Racing Team ZVO. The team claimed four victories, finishing third in the championship and leading a championship-high 137 laps. In GT World Challenge, Schiller joined Al Faisal Al Zubair and Axcil Jefferies behind the wheel of a Silver Cup entry fielded under the Al Manar Racing by HRT banner. The team claimed a class victory at Circuit Paul Ricard, finishing fourth in the class championship. Later that year, Schiller joined Valentin Pierburg in Team Germany's entry into the GT Relay competition at the 2022 FIA Motorsport Games. The duo swept the two qualifying races, before finishing as runners-up in the medal race. Schiller closed nearly 30 seconds to the leading car of Eric Debard before a late safety car ended the race under full-course yellow conditions.

In 2023, after two years in lower classes, Schiller returned to the Pro class of the GT World Challenge Europe Endurance Cup. He joined co-drivers Luca Stolz and Maro Engel behind the wheel of GetSpeed Performance's sole Pro entry. Schiller was also added to the Mercedes-AMG factory roster for the 2023 season.

== Racing record ==
=== Career summary ===
| Season | Series | Team | Races | Wins | Poles | F/Laps | Podiums | Points | Position |
|---|---|---|---|---|---|---|---|---|---|
| 2012 | Formula BMW Talent Cup | | ? | ? | ? | ? | ? | 22 | 7th |
| 2013 | ADAC Formel Masters | Schiller / G&J Motorsport | 24 | 1 | 0 | 0 | 1 | 82 | 11th |
| 2014 | ADAC Formel Masters | Schiller Motorsport | 24 | 2 | 0 | 0 | 3 | 154 | 8th |
| 2014 | Euroformula Open Championship | Team West-Tec F3 | 1 | 0 | 0 | 0 | 0 | 0 | NC |
| 2015 | FIA Formula 3 European Championship | Team West-Tec F3 | 24 | 0 | 0 | 0 | 0 | 2 | 25th |
| 2016 | Renault Sport Trophy - Am | Team Estrella Galicia 0,0 Marc VDS | 6 | 4 | 4 | 2 | 5 | 178 | **1st** |
| 2016 | Renault Sport Trophy - Endurance | Team Estrella Galicia 0,0 Marc VDS | 6 | 2 | 1 | 0 | 4 | 87 | **1st** |
| 2016 | VLN Series - SP9 | HTP Motorsport | 2 | 0 | 0 | 0 | 0 | 0 | NC |
| 2016 | 24 Hours of Nürburgring - SP7 | | 1 | 0 | 0 | ? | 0 | N/A | DNF |
| 2016-17 | Asian Le Mans Series - LMP2 | Race Performance | 3 | 1 | 0 | 0 | 2 | 55 | 6th |
| 2017 | Blancpain GT Series Sprint Cup | HTP Motorsport | 10 | 0 | 0 | 0 | 1 | 22 | 11th |
| 2017 | Blancpain GT Series Sprint Cup - Silver | HTP Motorsport | 10 | 7 | 0 | 0 | 10 | 154 | **1st** |
| 2017 | Blancpain GT Series Endurance Cup | HTP Motorsport | 5 | 0 | 0 | 0 | 0 | 27 | 15th |
| 2017 | Intercontinental GT Challenge | HTP Motorsport | 1 | 0 | 0 | 0 | 0 | 6 | 13th |
| 2017 | 24H Series - A6-Pro | HTP Motorsport | 1 | 0 | 0 | 0 | 0 | 14 | ? |
| 2018 | Pirelli World Challenge - GT | CRP Racing | 4 | 0 | 0 | 1 | 1 | 73 | 13th |
| 2018 | Blancpain GT Series Endurance Cup | AKKA ASP Team | 1 | 0 | 0 | 0 | 0 | 0 | NC |
| 2018 | Blancpain GT Series Endurance Cup - Silver | AKKA ASP Team | 1 | 0 | 0 | 0 | 0 | 10 | 17th |
| 2018 | VLN Series - SP9 | GigaSpeed Team GetSpeed Performance | 6 | 0 | 0 | 0 | 0 | 34.17 | ? |
| 2018 | 24 Hours of Nürburgring - SP9 | BMW Team Schnitzer | 1 | 0 | 0 | 0 | 0 | N/A | 12th |
| 2019 | Nürburgring Endurance Series - SP9 Pro-Am | GetSpeed Performance | 8 | 1 | 0 | 0 | 5 | 30.75 | **3rd** |
| 2019 | International GT Open | GetSpeed Performance | 2 | 0 | 0 | 0 | 0 | 3 | 31st |
| 2019 | 24 Hours of Nürburgring - SP9 | GetSpeed Performance | 1 | 0 | 0 | 0 | 0 | N/A | 12th |
| 2019 | Blancpain GT Series Endurance Cup | Mercedes-AMG Team AKKA ASP | 1 | 0 | 0 | 0 | 0 | 9 | 25th |
| 2019 | Intercontinental GT Challenge | Mercedes-AMG Team AKKA ASP | 1 | 0 | 0 | 0 | 0 | 1 | 37th |
| 2019 | Blancpain GT World Challenge Europe | AKKA ASP Team | 6 | 0 | 1 | 0 | 0 | 8 | 17th |
| 2019 | IMSA SportsCar Championship - GTD | P1 Motorsports | 2 | 0 | 0 | 0 | 0 | 32 | 46th |
| 2020 | Nürburgring Endurance Series - SP9 | GetSpeed Performance | 3 | 0 | 0 | 0 | 2 | 25.02 | 8th |
| 2020 | International GT Open | GetSpeed Performance | 2 | 0 | 0 | 1 | 1 | 13 | 15th |
| 2020 | GT World Challenge Europe Endurance Cup | GetSpeed Performance | 3 | 0 | 0 | 0 | 0 | 6 | 21st |
| 2020 | 24 Hours of Nürburgring - SP9 | Mercedes-AMG Team GetSpeed | 1 | 0 | 0 | 0 | 0 | N/A | DNF |
| 2021 | GT World Challenge Europe Endurance Cup - Pro-Am | Ram Racing | 4 | 0 | 0 | 1 | 1 | 33 | 14th |
| 2021 | Nürburgring Endurance Series - SP9 | GetSpeed Performance | 2 | 0 | ? | ? | ? | ? | ? |
| 2021 | IMSA SportsCar Championship - LMP2 | DragonSpeed USA | 1 | 0 | 0 | 0 | 1 | 0 | NC |
| 2021 | 24 Hours of Nürburgring - SP9 | Mercedes-AMG Team GetSpeed | 1 | 0 | 0 | 0 | 0 | N/A | 7th |
| 2022 | ADAC GT Masters | Drago Racing Team zvo | 14 | 4 | 0 | 0 | 5 | 153 | **3rd** |
| 2022 | IMSA SportsCar Championship - GTD | SunEnergy1 Racing | 1 | 0 | 0 | 0 | 0 | 128 | 70th |
| 2022 | GT World Challenge Europe Endurance Cup | Al Manar Racing by HRT | 5 | 0 | 0 | 0 | 0 | 6 | 31st |
| 2022 | Intercontinental GT Challenge | Al Manar Racing by HRT | | | | | | | |
| 2022 | Intercontinental GT Challenge | Al Manar Racing by GetSpeed | | | | | | | |
| 2022 | GT World Challenge Europe Sprint Cup | Madpanda Motorsport | 2 | 0 | 0 | 0 | 0 | 6 | 17th |
| 2022 | International GT Open | GetSpeed Performance | | | | | | | |
| 2022 | FIA Motorsport Games GT Cup | Team Germany | 1 | 0 | 1 | 1 | 1 | N/A | **2nd** |
| 2022 | 24 Hours of Nürburgring - SP9 | Mercedes-AMG Team GetSpeed BWT | 1 | 0 | 0 | 0 | 1 | N/A | **2nd** |
| 2022-23 | Middle East Trophy - GT3 | Al Manar Racing by HRT | 1 | 0 | 0 | 0 | 0 | 0 | NC† |
| 2023 | Asian Le Mans Series - GT | GetSpeed Performance | 4 | 0 | 0 | 1 | 2 | 52 | **3rd** |
| 2023 | GT World Challenge Europe Endurance Cup | Mercedes-AMG Team Al Manar | 5 | 0 | 0 | 0 | 2 | 57 | 4th |
| 2023 | Intercontinental GT Challenge | Mercedes-AMG Team Al Manar | 1 | 0 | 0 | 0 | 0 | 23 | 17th |
| 2023 | Intercontinental GT Challenge | Mercedes-AMG Team 2 Seas | 1 | 0 | 0 | 0 | 1 | 23 | 17th |
| 2023 | GT World Challenge Europe Sprint Cup | Theeba Motorsport | 6 | 0 | 0 | 0 | 0 | 0 | NC |
| 2023 | GT World Challenge Asia - GT3 | Craft-Bamboo Racing | 4 | 1 | 0 | 0 | 2 | 51 | 14th |
| 2023 | IMSA SportsCar Championship - GTD | SunEnergy1 | 1 | 0 | 1 | 0 | 0 | 125 | 68th |
| 2023 | International GT Open | Al Manar Racing by GetSpeed | 6 | 2 | 2 | 3 | 5 | 62 | 8th |
| 2023 | 24 Hours of Nürburgring - SP9 | Mercedes-AMG Team GetSpeed | 1 | 0 | 0 | 0 | 0 | N/A | 4th |
| 2023-24 | Asian Le Mans Series - GT | Al Manar Racing by GetSpeed | 5 | 0 | 2 | 0 | 1 | 50 | 5th |
| 2023-24 | Middle East Trophy - GT3 | GetSpeed Performance | 1 | 0 | 0 | 0 | 0 | 0 | NC† |
| 2024 | GT World Challenge Europe Endurance Cup | Mercedes-AMG Team GetSpeed | 5 | 0 | 0 | 0 | 1 | 24 | 13th |
| 2024 | Nürburgring Langstrecken-Serie - SP9 | Mercedes-AMG Team GetSpeed | | | | | | | |
| 2024 | Intercontinental GT Challenge | Mercedes-AMG Team GetSpeed | | | | | | | |
| 2024 | 24 Hours of Nürburgring - SP9 | Mercedes-AMG Team GetSpeed | 1 | 0 | 0 | 0 | 0 | N/A | DNF |
| 2024 | International GT Open | GetSpeed Performance | 13 | 1 | 2 | 4 | 3 | 88 | 5th |
| 2024 | GT World Challenge Asia | Craft-Bamboo Racing | 6 | 0 | 0 | ? | 0 | 10 | 35th |
| 2024 | GT World Challenge America - Pro | Mercedes-AMG Team Lone Star Racing | 1 | 0 | 0 | 0 | 0 | 0 | NC† |
| 2024-25 | Asian Le Mans Series - GT | GetSpeed Performance | 5 | 0 | 1 | 0 | 0 | 7 | 21st |
| 2025 | IMSA SportsCar Championship - GTD Pro | GetSpeed | 1 | 0 | 0 | 0 | 0 | 280 | 29th |
| 2025 | International GT Open | GetSpeed | 11 | 0 | 2 | 2 | 5 | 83 | 9th |
| 2025 | European Le Mans Series - LMGT3 | Iron Lynx | 6 | 0 | 3 | 0 | 2 | 51 | 7th |
| 2025 | GT World Challenge Europe Endurance Cup | Mercedes-AMG Team GetSpeed | 5 | 0 | 1 | 1 | 0 | 15 | 14th |
| 2025 | 24 Hours of Nürburgring - SP9 | Mercedes-AMG Team GetSpeed | 1 | 0 | 0 | 0 | 0 | N/A | DNF |
| 2025 | Nürburgring Langstrecken-Serie - SP9 | Mercedes-AMG Team Bilstein by GetSpeed | | | | | | | |
| 2025-26 | Asian Le Mans Series - GT | GetSpeed Performance | 6 | 1 | 2 | 1 | 2 | 69 | 4th |
| 2026 | IMSA SportsCar Championship - GTD Pro | Bartone Bros with GetSpeed | 1 | 0 | 0 | 0 | 0 | 225 | 41st |
| 2026 | Nürburgring Langstrecken-Serie - SP9 | Mercedes-AMG Team Ravenol | | | | | | | |
| 2026 | 24 Hours of Nürburgring - SP9 | Mercedes-AMG Team Ravenol | 1 | 1 | 0 | 0 | 1 | N/A | **1st** |
| 2026 | GT World Challenge Europe Endurance Cup | Mercedes-AMG Team GetSpeed | 5 | 1 | 0 | 0 | 1 | 41 | 5th |
| 2026 | GT World Challenge Europe Sprint Cup | GetSpeed Team Dubai | 8 | 0 | 0 | 0 | 0 | 0 | NC |
| 2026 | International GT Open | GetSpeed | 1 | 0 | 0 | 0 | 1 | 10 | 30th |
| 2026 | Intercontinental GT Challenge | Mercedes-AMG Team Tigani Motorsport | 1 | 0 | 0 | 0 | 0 | 25 | 15th |
| 2026 | Intercontinental GT Challenge | Mercedes-AMG Team Ravenol | 1 | 1 | 0 | 0 | 1 | 25 | 15th |
| 2026 | Intercontinental GT Challenge | Mercedes-AMG Team GetSpeed | 1 | 0 | 0 | 0 | 0 | 25 | 15th |
| 2026-27 | Asian Le Mans Series - GT3 | GetSpeed | | | | | | 25 | 15th |

* Season still in progress.

=== Complete ADAC Formel Masters results ===
(key) (Races in bold indicate pole position) (Races in italics indicate fastest lap)

| Year | Team | 1 | 2 | 3 | 4 | 5 | 6 | 7 | 8 | 9 | 10 | 11 | 12 | 13 | 14 | 15 | 16 | 17 | 18 | 19 | 20 | 21 | 22 | 23 | 24 | DC | Points |
|---|---|---|---|---|---|---|---|---|---|---|---|---|---|---|---|---|---|---|---|---|---|---|---|---|---|---|---|
| 2013 | Schiller Motorsport | OSC; 1; 19 | OSC; 2; 10 | OSC; 3; 10 | SPA; 1; 7 | SPA; 2; 9 | SPA; 3 Ret | SAC; 1; 8 | SAC; 2; 10 | SAC; 3; 12 | NÜR; 1; 19 | NÜR; 2; 18 | NÜR; 3; 8 | RBR; 1 Ret | RBR; 2; 8 | RBR; 3; 5 | LAU; 1; 7 | LAU; 2; 7 | LAU; 3; 1 | SVK; 1 Ret | SVK; 2; 7 | SVK; 3; 5 | HOC; 1; 5 | HOC; 2 Ret | HOC; 3; 8 | 11th | 82 |
| 2014 | Schiller Motorsport | OSC; 1; 5 | OSC; 2; 8 | OSC; 3; 1 | ZAN; 1 Ret | ZAN; 2; 2 | ZAN; 3 Ret | LAU; 1; 8 | LAU; 2; 13 | LAU; 3; 10 | RBR; 1; 4 | RBR; 2; 4 | RBR; 3; 8 | SVK; 1; 4 | SVK; 2; 1 | SVK; 3 Ret | NÜR; 1; 6 | NÜR; 2; 6 | NÜR; 3 Ret | SAC; 1; 6 | SAC; 2; 7 | SAC; 3; 7 | HOC; 1; 8 | HOC; 2; 11 | HOC; 3; 11 | 8th | 154 |

=== Complete FIA Formula 3 European Championship results ===
(key) (Races in bold indicate pole position) (Races in italics indicate fastest lap)

| Year | Entrant | Engine | 1 | 2 | 3 | 4 | 5 | 6 | 7 | 8 | 9 | 10 | 11 | 12 | 13 | 14 | 15 | 16 | 17 | 18 | 19 | 20 | 21 | 22 | 23 | 24 | 25 | 26 | 27 | 28 | 29 | 30 | 31 | 32 | 33 | DC | Points |
|---|---|---|---|---|---|---|---|---|---|---|---|---|---|---|---|---|---|---|---|---|---|---|---|---|---|---|---|---|---|---|---|---|---|---|---|---|---|
| 2015 | Team West-Tec F3 | Mercedes | SIL; 1; 16 | SIL; 2; 11 | SIL; 3; 26 | HOC; 1; 16 | HOC; 2; 12 | HOC; 3; 15 | PAU; 1 Ret | PAU; 2 Ret | PAU; 3; 18 | MNZ; 1 Ret | MNZ; 2; 25 | MNZ; 3 Ret | SPA; 1; 9 | SPA; 2; 15 | SPA; 3 Ret | NOR; 1; 26 | NOR; 2; 15 | NOR; 3; 15 | ZAN; 1; 25 | ZAN; 2; 25 | ZAN; 3; 13 | RBR; 1; 19 | RBR; 2; 28 | RBR; 3; 28 | ALG; 1 | ALG; 2 | ALG; 3 | NÜR; 1 | NÜR; 2 | NÜR; 3 | HOC; 1 | HOC; 2 | HOC; 3 | 25th | 2 |

=== Complete Asian Le Mans Series results ===
(key) (Races in bold indicate pole position) (Races in italics indicate fastest lap)

| Year | Team | Class | Car | Engine | 1 | 2 | 3 | 4 | 5 | 6 | Pos. | Points |
|---|---|---|---|---|---|---|---|---|---|---|---|---|
| 2016–17 | Race Performance | LMP2 | Oreca 03R | Judd HK 3.6 L V8 | ZHU | FUJ; 1 | **CHA**; 4 | SEP; 2 | | | 6th | 55 |
| 2023 | GetSpeed Performance | GT | Mercedes-AMG GT3 Evo | Mercedes-AMG M159 6.2 L V8 | DUB; 1; 2 | DUB; 2; 2 | ABU; 1; 7 | ABU; 2; 5 | | | 3rd | 52 |
| 2023–24 | AlManar Racing by GetSpeed | GT | Mercedes-AMG GT3 Evo | Mercedes-AMG M159 6.2 L V8 | SEP; 1; 4 | SEP; 2; 4 | **DUB**; 2 | **ABU**; **1**; 9 | ABU; 2; 8 | | 5th | 50 |
| 2024–25 | GetSpeed Performance | GT | Mercedes-AMG GT3 Evo | Mercedes-AMG M159 6.2 L V8 | **SEP**; **1**; 15 | SEP; 2; 7 | DUB; 1; 24 | DUB; 2; 16 | ABU; 1 Ret | ABU; 2; 17 | 21st | 7 |
| 2025–26 | GetSpeed Performance | GT | Mercedes-AMG GT3 Evo | Mercedes-AMG M159 6.2 L V8 | SEP; 1; 1 | SEP; 2; 6 | DUB; 1; 7 | DUB; 2; 6 | **ABU**; **1** Ret | **ABU**; **2**; 2 | 4th | 69 |

=== Complete GT World Challenge Europe results ===
==== GT World Challenge Europe Endurance Cup ====
(key) (Races in bold indicate pole position) (Races in italics indicate fastest lap)

| Year | Team | Car | Class | 1 | 2 | 3 | 4 | 5 | 6 | 7 | Pos. | Points |
|---|---|---|---|---|---|---|---|---|---|---|---|---|
| 2017 | HTP Motorsport | Mercedes-AMG GT3 | Pro | MNZ; Ret | SIL; 37 | LEC; Ret | SPA; 6H; 6 | SPA; 12H; 2 | SPA; 24H; 7 | CAT; 6 | 15th | 27 |
| 2018 | AKKA ASP Team | Mercedes-AMG GT3 | Silver | MNZ | SIL | LEC | SPA; 6H; 39 | SPA; 12H; 30 | SPA; 24H; Ret | CAT | 17th | 10 |
| 2019 | Mercedes-AMG Team AKKA ASP | Mercedes-AMG GT3 Evo | Pro | MNZ | SIL | LEC | SPA; 6H; 4 | SPA; 12H; 7 | SPA; 24H; 13 | CAT | 25th | 9 |
| 2020 | GetSpeed Performance | Mercedes-AMG GT3 Evo | Pro | IMO; 39 | NÜR; 7 | SPA; 6H | SPA; 12H | SPA; 24H | LEC; 15 | | 21st | 6 |
| 2021 | Ram Racing | Mercedes-AMG GT3 Evo | Pro-Am | MNZ | LEC; 26 | SPA; 6H; 42 | SPA; 12H; 32 | SPA; 24H; 34 | NÜR; 23 | CAT; Ret | 14th | 33 |
| 2022 | Al Manar Racing by HRT | Mercedes-AMG GT3 Evo | Silver | IMO; 22 | LEC; 7 | SPA; 6H; Ret | SPA; 12H; Ret | **SPA**; **24H**; Ret | HOC; 13 | CAT; 15 | 4th | 66 |
| 2023 | Mercedes-AMG Team Al Manar | Mercedes-AMG GT3 Evo | Pro | MNZ; Ret | LEC; 2 | SPA; 6H; 9 | SPA; 12H; 15 | SPA; 24H; 9 | NÜR; 2 | CAT; 4 | 4th | 57 |
| 2024 | Mercedes-AMG Team GetSpeed | Mercedes-AMG GT3 Evo | Pro | LEC; 3 | SPA; 6H; 24 | SPA; 12H; 5 | SPA; 24H; Ret | NÜR; 12 | MNZ; Ret | JED; 8 | 13th | 24 |
| 2025 | Mercedes-AMG Team GetSpeed | Mercedes-AMG GT3 Evo | Pro | LEC; 13 | **MNZ**; 48† | SPA; 6H; 1 | SPA; 12H; 60† | SPA; 24H; Ret | NÜR; 22 | CAT; 14 | 14th | 15 |
| 2026 | Mercedes-AMG Team GetSpeed | Mercedes-AMG GT3 Evo | Pro | LEC; 7 | MNZ; Ret | SPA; 6H; 62† | SPA; 12H; 62† | SPA; 24H; Ret | NÜR; 5 | ALG; 1 | 5th | 41 |

==== GT World Challenge Europe Sprint Cup ====
(key) (Races in bold indicate pole position) (Races in italics indicate fastest lap)

| Year | Team | Car | Class | 1 | 2 | 3 | 4 | 5 | 6 | 7 | 8 | 9 | 10 | Pos. | Points |
|---|---|---|---|---|---|---|---|---|---|---|---|---|---|---|---|
| 2017 | HTP Motorsport | Mercedes-AMG GT3 | Silver | MIS; QR; 2 | MIS; CR; 12 | BRH; QR; 16 | BRH; CR; 17 | ZOL; QR; 17 | ZOL; CR; 8 | HUN; QR; 14 | HUN; CR; 8 | NÜR; CR; 9 | NÜR; CR; 6 | 1st | 154 |
| 2019 | AKKA ASP Team | Mercedes-AMG GT3 | Silver | BRH; 1; 15 | **BRH**; **2**; 18 | MIS; 1; 5 | **MIS**; **2**; 26 | ZAN; 1 | ZAN; 2 | NÜR; 1; 10 | NÜR; 2; 10 | HUN; 1 | HUN; 2 | 7th | 59 |
| 2022 | Madpanda Motorsport | Mercedes-AMG GT3 Evo | Silver | BRH; 1 | BRH; 2 | MAG; 1 | MAG; 2 | ZAN; 1 | ZAN; 2 | MIS; 1 | MIS; 2 | VAL; 1 Ret | VAL; 2; 5 | 13th | 16.5 |
| 2023 | Theeba Motorsport | Mercedes-AMG GT3 Evo | Bronze | MIS; 1; 24 | MIS; 2 Ret | HOC; 1; 22 | **HOC**; **2**; 32 | VAL; 1; 30 | VAL; 2; 21 | | | | | 7th | 30.5 |
| 2026 | GetSpeed Team Dubai | Mercedes-AMG GT3 Evo | Bronze | **MIS**; **1**; 21 | MIS; 2; 36 | MAG; 1; 36 | MAG; 2; 32 | ZAN; 1; 34 | ZAN; 2; 40 | CAT; 1; 32 | CAT; 2; 31 | | | 6th | 46 |

=== Complete IMSA SportsCar Championship results ===
(key) (Races in bold indicate pole position) (Races in italics indicate fastest lap)

| Year | Team | Class | Make | Engine | 1 | 2 | 3 | 4 | 5 | 6 | 7 | 8 | 9 | 10 | 11 | 12 | Rank | Points |
|---|---|---|---|---|---|---|---|---|---|---|---|---|---|---|---|---|---|---|
| 2019 | P1 Motorsports | GTD | Mercedes-AMG GT3 | Mercedes-AMG M159 6.2 L V8 | DAY; 19 | SEB; 11 | MDO | DET | WGL | MOS | LIM | ELK | VIR | LGA | PET | | 46th | 32 |
| 2021 | DragonSpeed USA | LMP2 | Oreca 07 | Gibson GK428 4.2 L V8 | DAY; 3† | SEB | WGI | WGL | ELK | LGA | PET | | | | | | NC† | 0† |
| 2022 | SunEnergy1 | GTD | Mercedes-AMG GT3 Evo | Mercedes-AMG M159 6.2 L V8 | DAY; 21 | SEB | LBH | LGA | MDO | DET | WGL | MOS | LIM | ELK | VIR | PET | 70th | 128 |
| 2023 | SunEnergy1 | GTD | Mercedes-AMG GT3 Evo | Mercedes-AMG M159 6.2 L V8 | **DAY**; 22 | SEB | LBH | MON | WGL | MOS | LIM | ELK | VIR | IMS | PET | | 68th | 125 |
| 2025 | GetSpeed Performance | GTD Pro | Mercedes-AMG GT3 Evo | Mercedes-AMG M159 6.2 L V8 | DAY; 5 | SEB | LGA | DET | WGL | MOS | ELK | VIR | IMS | PET | | | 29th | 280 |
| 2026 | Bartone Bros with GetSpeed | GTD Pro | Mercedes-AMG GT3 Evo | Mercedes-AMG M159 6.2 L V8 | DAY; 11 | SEB | LGA | DET | WGL | MOS | ELK | VIR | IMS | PET | | | 41st | 225 |

^{†} Points only counted towards the Michelin Endurance Cup, and not the overall LMP2 Championship.

=== Complete ADAC GT Masters results ===
(key) (Races in bold indicate pole position) (Races in italics indicate fastest lap)

| Year | Team | Car | 1 | 2 | 3 | 4 | 5 | 6 | 7 | 8 | 9 | 10 | 11 | 12 | 13 | 14 | DC | Points |
|---|---|---|---|---|---|---|---|---|---|---|---|---|---|---|---|---|---|---|
| 2022 | Drago Racing Team zvo | Mercedes-AMG GT3 Evo | OSC; 1; 13 | OSC; 2; 1^{2} | RBR; 1; 12 | RBR; 2; 12 | ZAN; 1 Ret | ZAN; 2; 7 | NÜR; 1; 3^{2} | NÜR; 2; 1^{3} | LAU; 1; 17 | LAU; 2; 10 | SAC; 1; 1^{2} | SAC; 2 Ret | HOC; 1; 16^{3} | HOC; 2; 1^{3} | 3rd | 153 |

=== Complete European Le Mans Series results ===
(key) (Races in bold indicate pole position) (Races in italics indicate fastest lap)

| Year | Entrant | Class | Chassis | Engine | 1 | 2 | 3 | 4 | 5 | 6 | Pos. | Points |
|---|---|---|---|---|---|---|---|---|---|---|---|---|
| 2025 | Iron Lynx | LMGT3 | Mercedes-AMG GT3 Evo | Mercedes-AMG M159 6.2 L V8 | **CAT**; Ret | LEC; 2 | **IMO**; Ret | **SPA**; 2 | SIL; Ret | ALG; 4 | 7th | 51 |

Sporting positions
| Preceded by Dario Capitanio | Renault Sport Trophy; AM Class Champion; 2016 | Succeeded by Series Folded |
| Preceded by David Fumanelli; Dario Capitanio | Renault Sport Trophy; Endurance Trophy Champion; 2016; With: Markus Palttala | Succeeded by Series Folded |
| Preceded by Michele Beretta; Luca Stolz | Blancpain GT Series Sprint Cup; Silver Cup Champion; 2017; With: Jules Szymkowiak | Succeeded by Nico Bastian; Jack Manchester |
