= 2014 ADAC Formel Masters =

Motorsport season

The 2014 ADAC Formel Masters was the seventh and the final season of the ADAC Formel Masters series, an open-wheel motor racing series for emerging young racing drivers based in Germany. The season began on 26 April at Motorsport Arena Oschersleben and finished on 5 October at Hockenheim after eight race weekends, totalling 24 races.

Neuhauser Racing Team driver Mikkel Jensen dominated the battle for the drivers' championship from start to finish taking ten wins from the 24 races on his way to the championship title with a round to spare. The other race wins were shared between his teammate Tim Zimmermann, ADAC Berlin-Brandenburg drivers Maximilian Günther and Marvin Dienst, Schiller Motorsport driver Fabian Schiller, as well as Lotus drivers Dennis Marschall and Joel Eriksson.

== Teams and drivers ==
Team	No.	Drivers	Rounds
(Germany) ADAC Berlin-Brandenburg	1	(Germany) Maximilian Günther	All
(Germany) ADAC Berlin-Brandenburg	2	(Germany) Kim-Luis Schramm	All
(Germany) ADAC Berlin-Brandenburg	3	(Germany) Marvin Dienst	All
(Germany) ADAC Berlin-Brandenburg	4	(Switzerland) Giorgio Maggi	All
(Germany) ADAC Berlin-Brandenburg	5	(Germany) Philip Hamprecht	1–6
(Austria) Neuhauser Racing Team	7	(Germany) Tim Zimmermann	All
(Austria) Neuhauser Racing Team	8	(Denmark) Mikkel Jensen	All
(Germany) Schiller Motorsport	9	(Germany) Fabian Schiller	All
(Germany) Schiller Motorsport	10	(Germany) Nico Menzel	All
(Germany) Lotus	11	(Germany) Luis-Enrique Breuer	3–8
(Germany) Lotus	12	(Germany) Dennis Marschall	All
(Germany) Lotus	14	(Sweden) Joel Eriksson	All
(Germany) Lotus	15	(Switzerland) Ralph Boschung	All
(Germany) JBR Motorsport & Engineering	18	(Germany) David Kolkmann	All
(Germany) JBR Motorsport & Engineering	19	(Poland) Igor Waliłko	All
(Austria) HS Engineering	20	(Austria) Corinna Kamper	1, 4

== Race calendar and results ==
Round		Circuit	Date	Pole position	Fastest lap	Winning driver	Winning team
1	R1	(Germany) Motorsport Arena Oschersleben	26 April	(Denmark) Mikkel Jensen	(Denmark) Mikkel Jensen	(Denmark) Mikkel Jensen	(Austria) Neuhauser Racing Team
1	R2	(Germany) Motorsport Arena Oschersleben	27 April	(Germany) Maximilian Günther	(Denmark) Mikkel Jensen	(Germany) Maximilian Günther	(Germany) ADAC Berlin-Brandenburg
1	R3	(Germany) Motorsport Arena Oschersleben	27 April		(Germany) Kim-Luis Schramm	(Germany) Fabian Schiller	(Germany) Schiller Motorsport
2	R1	(Netherlands) Circuit Park Zandvoort	10 May	(Germany) Maximilian Günther	(Germany) Tim Zimmermann	(Denmark) Mikkel Jensen	(Austria) Neuhauser Racing Team
2	R2	(Netherlands) Circuit Park Zandvoort	11 May	(Germany) Maximilian Günther	(Germany) Maximilian Günther	(Germany) Maximilian Günther	(Germany) ADAC Berlin-Brandenburg
2	R3	(Netherlands) Circuit Park Zandvoort	11 May		(Germany) Marvin Dienst	(Germany) Marvin Dienst	(Germany) ADAC Berlin-Brandenburg
3	R1	(Germany) Lausitzring	24 May	(Germany) Marvin Dienst	(Germany) Marvin Dienst	(Germany) Maximilian Günther	(Germany) ADAC Berlin-Brandenburg
3	R2	(Germany) Lausitzring	25 May	(Germany) Marvin Dienst	(Germany) Maximilian Günther	(Germany) Marvin Dienst	(Germany) ADAC Berlin-Brandenburg
3	R3	(Germany) Lausitzring	25 May		(Germany) Maximilian Günther	(Germany) Dennis Marschall	(Germany) Lotus
4	R1	(Austria) Red Bull Ring	7 June	(Denmark) Mikkel Jensen	(Switzerland) Ralph Boschung	(Denmark) Mikkel Jensen	(Austria) Neuhauser Racing Team
4	R2	(Austria) Red Bull Ring	8 June	(Denmark) Mikkel Jensen	(Denmark) Mikkel Jensen	(Denmark) Mikkel Jensen	(Austria) Neuhauser Racing Team
4	R3	(Austria) Red Bull Ring	8 June		(Denmark) Mikkel Jensen	(Sweden) Joel Eriksson	(Germany) Lotus
5	R1	Automotodróm Slovakia Ring	9 August	(Germany) Tim Zimmermann	(Denmark) Mikkel Jensen	(Denmark) Mikkel Jensen	(Austria) Neuhauser Racing Team
5	R2	Automotodróm Slovakia Ring	10 August	(Denmark) Mikkel Jensen	(Denmark) Mikkel Jensen	(Germany) Fabian Schiller	(Germany) Schiller Motorsport
5	R3	Automotodróm Slovakia Ring	10 August		(Germany) Tim Zimmermann	(Germany) Tim Zimmermann	(Austria) Neuhauser Racing Team
6	R1	(Germany) Nürburgring	30 August	(Denmark) Mikkel Jensen	(Denmark) Mikkel Jensen	(Denmark) Mikkel Jensen	(Austria) Neuhauser Racing Team
6	R2	(Germany) Nürburgring	30 August	(Denmark) Mikkel Jensen	(Germany) Marvin Dienst	(Germany) Marvin Dienst	(Germany) ADAC Berlin-Brandenburg
6	R3	(Germany) Nürburgring	31 August		(Denmark) Mikkel Jensen	(Denmark) Mikkel Jensen	(Austria) Neuhauser Racing Team
7	R1	(Germany) Sachsenring	20 September	(Denmark) Mikkel Jensen	(Denmark) Mikkel Jensen	(Denmark) Mikkel Jensen	(Austria) Neuhauser Racing Team
7	R2	(Germany) Sachsenring	20 September	(Denmark) Mikkel Jensen	(Denmark) Mikkel Jensen	(Denmark) Mikkel Jensen	(Austria) Neuhauser Racing Team
7	R3	(Germany) Sachsenring	21 September		(Germany) Maximilian Günther	(Germany) Maximilian Günther	(Germany) ADAC Berlin-Brandenburg
8	R1	(Germany) Hockenheimring	4 October	(Germany) Maximilian Günther	(Germany) Dennis Marschall	(Germany) Dennis Marschall	(Germany) Lotus
8	R2	(Germany) Hockenheimring	4 October	(Germany) Maximilian Günther	(Denmark) Mikkel Jensen	(Denmark) Mikkel Jensen	(Austria) Neuhauser Racing Team
8	R3	(Germany) Hockenheimring	5 October		(Denmark) Mikkel Jensen	(Germany) Dennis Marschall	(Germany) Lotus

== Championship standings ==
=== Drivers' Championship ===
- Points were awarded as follows:

	1	2	3	4	5	6	7	8	9	10
Races 1 & 2	25	18	15	12	10	8	6	4	2	1
Race 3	15	10	8	7	6	5	4	3	2	1

Pos	Driver	OSC (Germany)			ZAN (Netherlands)			LAU (Germany)			RBR (Austria)			SVK (Slovakia)			NÜR (Germany)			SAC (Germany)			HOC (Germany)			Pts
1	(Denmark) Mikkel Jensen	**1**	2	5	1	4	4	3	3	Ret	**1**	**1**	2	1	**2**	Ret	**1**	**7**	1	**1**	**1**	4	3	1	3	377
2	(Germany) Maximilian Günther	2	**1**	8	Ret	**1**	10	1	2	5	5	2	4	Ret	4	7	7	3	3	5	8	1	**2**	**4**	9	262
3	(Germany) Tim Zimmermann	3	7	2	2	6	2	9	10	6	Ret	5	5	**2**	9	1	4	5	2	3	3	5	5	5	2	224
4	(Germany) Marvin Dienst	Ret	3	7	5	5	1	**2**	**1**	4	6	Ret	7	9	10	9	2	1	4	9	6	2	9	6	7	205
5	(Sweden) Joel Eriksson	6	9	10	Ret	13	6	7	6	7	3	7	1	8	6	2	3	4	6	2	4	10	4	3	5	188
6	(Germany) Dennis Marschall	4	6	6	6	9	Ret	12	8	1	13	10	10	3	7	3	5	Ret	10	Ret	5	Ret	1	2	1	164
7	(Switzerland) Ralph Boschung	Ret	5	3	4	3	Ret	5	Ret	3	2	3	3	6	3	12	15	2	13	8	11	8	6	13	Ret	160
8	(Germany) Fabian Schiller	5	8	1	Ret	2	Ret	8	13	10	4	4	8	4	1	Ret	6	6	Ret	6	7	7	8	11	11	154
9	(Germany) Kim-Luis Schramm	Ret	4	4	3	7	3	4	4	8	9	6	6	Ret	8	5	8	9	7	7	Ret	Ret	14	8	4	127
10	(Poland) Igor Waliłko	8	Ret	Ret	8	10	Ret	Ret	14	12	10	11	9	5	5	Ret	9	8	12	4	2	3	7	9	6	89
11	(Germany) Philip Hamprecht	7	10	9	7	8	7	6	5	9	8	15	Ret	7	Ret	4	DNS	DNS	DNS							60
12	(Germany) Nico Menzel	9	11	Ret	Ret	Ret	5	13	9	11	7	8	11	11	11	10	11	11	8	12	Ret	9	10	7	8	36
13	(Germany) Luis-Enrique Breuer							10	7	2	11	12	14	Ret	13	6	10	10	5	10	12	11	12	10	10	33
14	(Germany) David Kolkmann	11	13	12	9	11	8	14	12	14	12	13	15	10	12	8	12	Ret	9	11	10	12	11	12	12	12
15	(Switzerland) Giorgio Maggi	10	12	11	Ret	12	9	11	11	13	15	14	12	12	14	11	13	12	11	Ret	9	6	13	14	13	10
16	(Austria) Corinna Kamper	12	14	13							14	9	13													2
Pos	Driver	OSC (Germany)			ZAN (Netherlands)			LAU (Germany)			RBR (Austria)			SVK (Slovakia)			NÜR (Germany)			SAC (Germany)			HOC (Germany)			Pts

Colour	Result
Gold	Winner
Silver	Second place
Bronze	Third place
Green	Points classification
Blue	Non-points classification
Blue	Non-classified finish (NC)
Purple	Retired, not classified (Ret)
Red	Did not qualify (DNQ)
Red	Did not pre-qualify (DNPQ)
Black	Disqualified (DSQ)
White	Did not start (DNS)
White	Withdrew (WD)
White	Race cancelled (C)
Blank	Did not practice (DNP)
Blank	Did not arrive (DNA)
Blank	Excluded (EX)

**Bold** – Pole
Italics – Fastest Lap

=== Teams' championship ===
Pos	Team	Points
1	(Austria) Neuhauser Racing Team	630
2	(Germany) ADAC Berlin-Brandenburg e.V.	512
3	(Germany) Lotus	444
4	(Germany) Schiller Motorsport	276
5	(Germany) JBR Motorsport & Engineering	189
6	(Austria) HS Engineering	14
