= Tim Zimmermann =

German racing driver (born 1996)

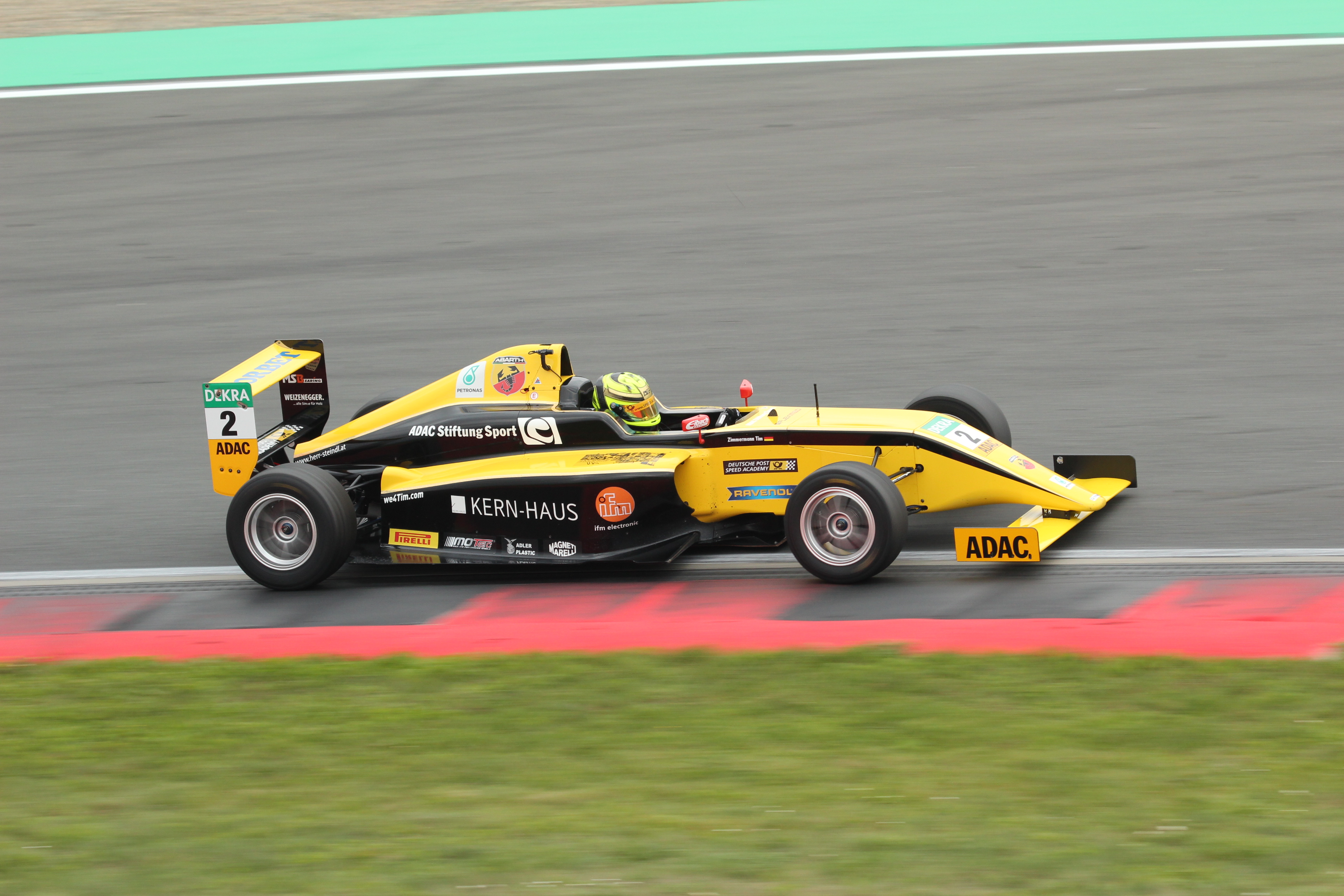
- Zimmermann in 2015
- Nationality: (Germany) German
- Born: 6 September 1996 (age 30) Langenargen, Germany
- Categorisation: FIA Silver

Tim Zimmermann (born 6 September 1996) is a German racing driver who last competed in ADAC GT Masters for FK Performance Motorsport.

== Career ==
Zimmermann began karting in 2007, competing until 2013. During his karting career, he most notably finished runner-up in the 2012 Euro Wintercup and ADAC Kart Masters' KF2 classes. In 2014, Zimmermann made his debut in single-seaters, racing in the final season of ADAC Formel Masters for Neuhauser Racing. In his maiden season with the team, Zimmermann won race three at the Slovakia Ring and took nine more podiums to end the year third in points. Remaining with Neuhauser Racing to race in the newly-rebranded ADAC Formula 4 Championship the following year, scoring three podiums with a best result of second (twice) en route to a sixth-place points finish. During 2015, Zimmermann also made a one-off appearance in the Italian F4 Championship for Prema Powerteam at Monza.

Switching to Touring cars for 2016, Zimmermann joined Junior Team Engstler to compete in the inaugural season of the ADAC TCR Germany Touring Car Championship. Starting off the season with a retirement and a DNS at Oschersleben, Zimmermann then finished second in race one at the Sachsenring, before ending the weekend by finishing third in race two. In the remaining five rounds, Zimmermann only took one other podium as he ended the year eighth in points despite missing one round. Joining Target Competition for his sophomore season in ADAC TCR Germany the following year, Zimmermann scored a lone podium at Oschersleben en route to a 16th-place points finish. Zimmermann then spent the following two years in Porsche Carrera Cup Germany for Black Falcon, scoring one podium at Sachsenring in 2018, as finished sixth and 12th in points in the two years, respectively.

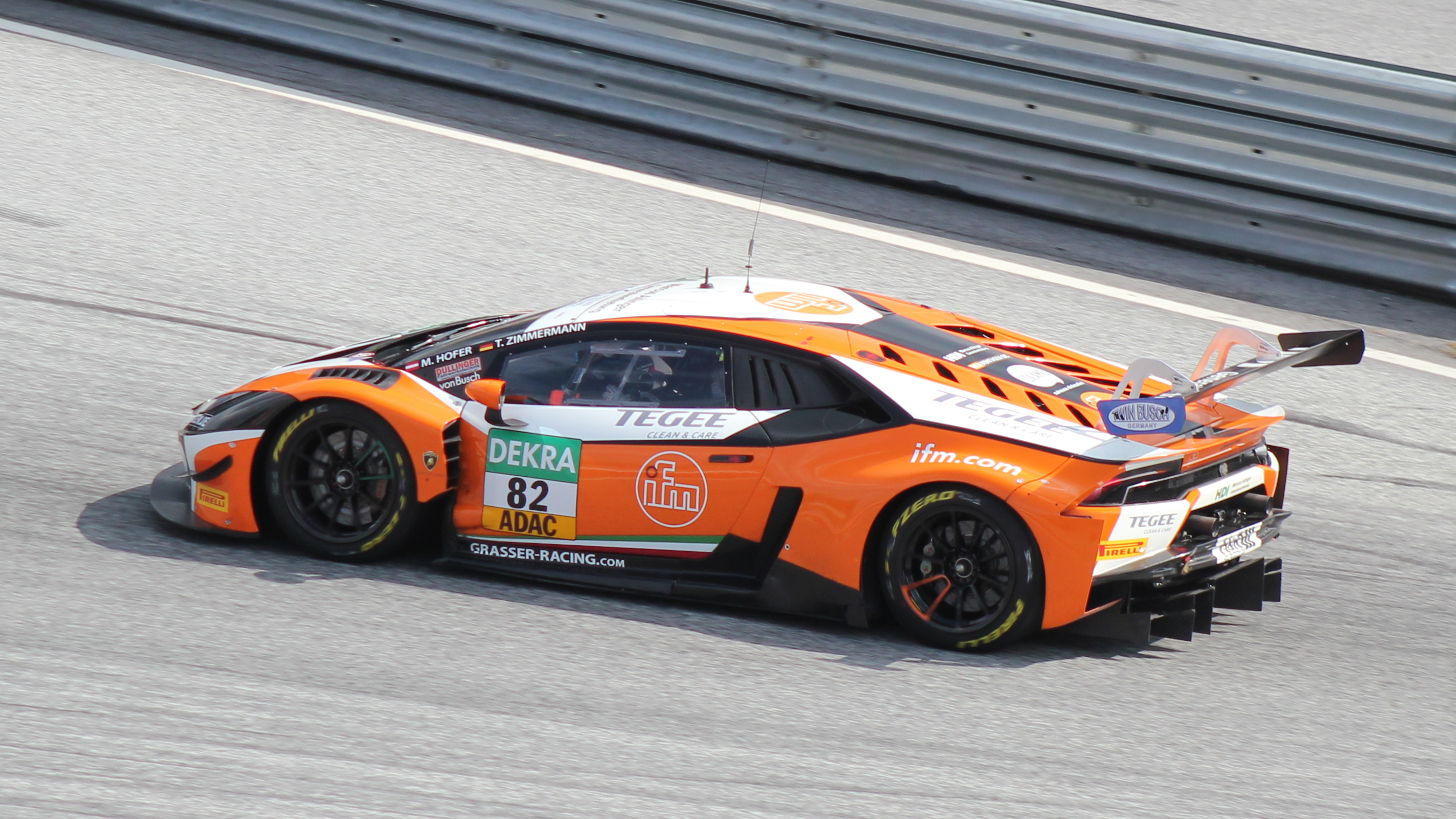
Zimmermann's Grasser Lamborghini in 2021.

Moving to GT3 competition for 2020, Zimmermann joined GRT Grasser Racing Team to race in ADAC GT Masters alongside Steijn Schothorst, as a new addition to the Lamborghini junior roster. In his first season in the series, Zimmermann qualified on pole three times and scored his maiden podium at the Hockenheimring by finishing third in race one en route to a 13th-place points finish as he also secured the Junior title. Remaining with GRT Grasser for 2021, Zimmermann raced with them in ADAC GT Masters and GT World Challenge Europe Endurance Cup, as well as a part-time schedule in the GTD class of the IMSA SportsCar Championship. Finishing 35th in the former, Zimmermann found more success in the Silver Cup of the GT World Challenge Europe Endurance Cup, in which he scored a class podium at Le Castellet and took pole at the Nürburgring to end the year 22nd in class. At the end of the year, Zimmermann made his LMP3 debut by joining Konrad Motorsport for the Estoril round of the Ultimate Cup Series.

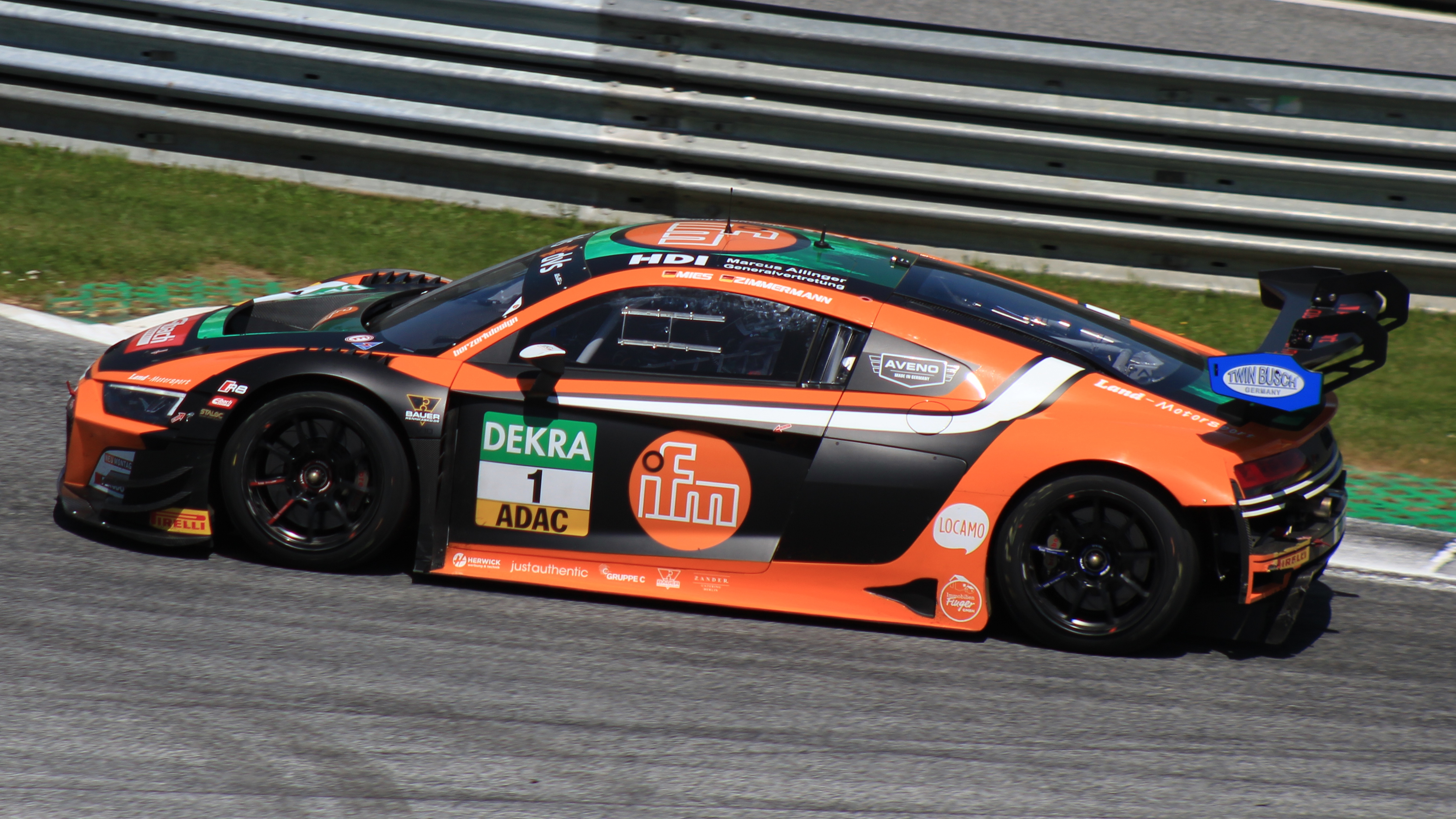
Zimmermann's Land Audi, which he and Christopher Mies took to one victory in 2022.

In 2022, Zimmermann joined Montaplast by Land Motorsport for his third season in ADAC GT Masters alongside Christopher Mies. In their only season together, the pair won at the Lausitzring and ended the year 12th in points. Remaining in ADAC GT Masters for the following year and moving to Huber Racing, Zimmermann won the season-opening race at the Hockenheimring and was third in points after three rounds, when his season was cut short as Huber Racing reduced its motorsport activity due to Christoph Huber's health-related issues.

In 2023, Zimmermann returned to GRT Grasser Racing Team alongside Benjamín Hites for his fourth full-time season in ADAC GT Masters. Alongside Hites, Zimmermann scored a lone podium at Zandvoort by finishing second in race one en route to a ninth-place points finish despite missing the Red Bull Ring round. In 2025, Zimmermann joined FK Performance Motorsport to continue in ADAC GT Masters alongside Leyton Fourie. In his first season for the BMW-affiliated team, Zimmermann scored his first win of the season in race two at Zandvoort, before repeating the same feat at the Salzburgring, as well as taking two more podiums to end the season runner-up in points.

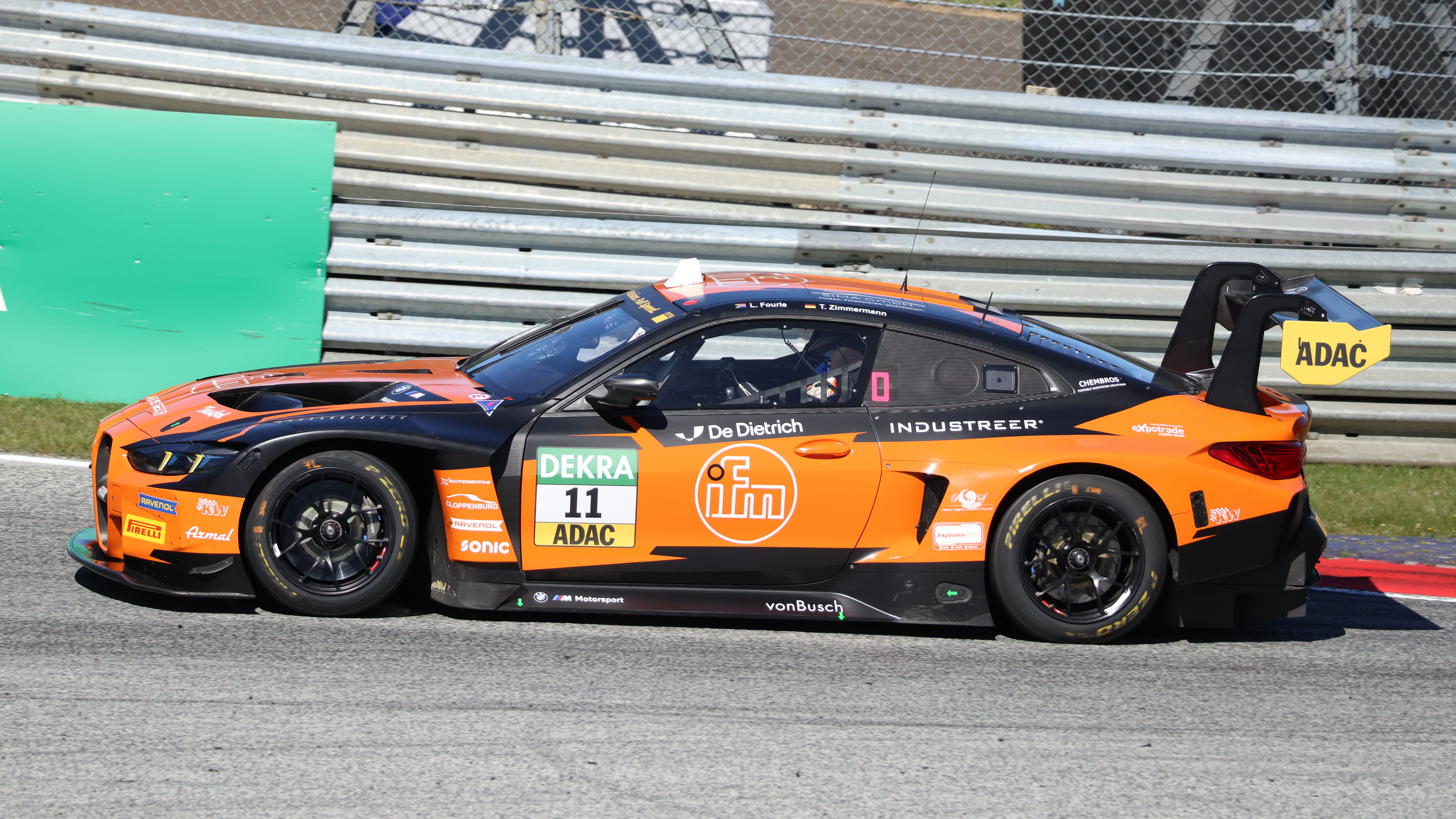
Zimmermann's FK Performance BMW in 2026.

Zimmermann continued with FK Performance Motorsport for his sophomore season in ADAC GT Masters in 2026. Remaining alongside Fourie, Zimmermann began the season with a win at Zandvoort, before taking further wins at the Lausitzring and the Salzburgring, as well as four other podiums, to secure runner-up honours overall.

== Karting record ==
=== Karting career summary ===
Season	Series	Team	Position
2010	South Garda Winter Cup – KF3	Maranello Kart	NC
2010	ADAC Kart Championship – KF3		5th
2010	Karting European Championship – KF3	Rs-Motorsport	NC
2010	Deutsche Kart-Meisterschaft – KF3		24th
2010	ADAC Kart Masters – KF3		5th
2011	Deutsche Kart-Meisterschaft – KF3		10th
2011	Karting European Championship – KF3		NC
2011	ADAC Kart Masters – KF3		7th
2012	Euro Wintercup – KF2		2nd
2012	Karting European Championship – KF2	Rs-Motorsport	83rd
2012	Deutsche Kart-Meisterschaft – KF1	Rs-Motorsport	17th
2012	ADAC Kart Masters – KF2		2nd
2013	South Garda Winter Cup – KZ2		NC
2013	Karting European Championship – KZ2	Rs-Motorsport	30th
2013	Deutsche Kart-Meisterschaft – KZ2		NC
2013	International Super Cup – KZ2	ART Grand Prix	30th

== Racing record ==
=== Racing career summary ===
Year	Series	Team	Races	Wins	Poles	F/Laps	Podiums	Points	Position
2014	ADAC Formel Masters	Neuhauser Racing	24	1	1	2	10	224	**3rd**
2015	ADAC Formula 4 Championship	Neuhauser Racing	23	0	0	0	3	152	6th
2015	Italian F4 Championship	Prema Powerteam	3	0	0	0	0	2	26th
2016	ADAC TCR Germany Touring Car Championship	Junior Team Engstler	11	0	0	1	3	73	8th
2016	24 Hours of Nürburgring – TCR	Racing One GmbH	1	0	0	0	1	—N/a	**2nd**
2017	ADAC TCR Germany Touring Car Championship	Target Competition	14	0	0	0	1	141	15th
2018	Porsche Carrera Cup Germany	Black Falcon Team TMD Friction	14	0	0	0	1	95	6th
2018	24 Hours of Nürburgring – SP7	Black Falcon Team TMD Friction	0	0	0	0	0	—N/a	DNS
2018	China Endurance Championship	S&D Motorsports	7	0	0	0	3	?	?
2019	Porsche Carrera Cup Germany	Black Falcon	15	0	0	0	0	62	12th
2020	ADAC GT Masters	GRT Grasser Racing Team	13	0	0	0	1	67	13th
2021	IMSA SportsCar Championship – GTD	GRT Grasser Racing Team	3	0	0	1	0	534	39th
2021	ADAC GT Masters	GRT Grasser Racing Team	11	0	0	0	0	14	35th
2021	GT World Challenge Europe Endurance Cup – Silver	GRT Grasser Racing Team	5	0	1	0	1	20	22nd
2021	Intercontinental GT Challenge	GRT Grasser Racing Team	1	0	0	0	0	0	NC
2021	Nürburgring Langstrecken-Serie - SP9 Pro	Konrad Motorsport	1	0	0	0	0	0	NC
2021	24 Hours of Nurburgring - SP9 Pro-Am	Konrad Motorsport	1	0	0	0	0	—N/a	5th
2021	Ultimate Cup Series Challenge Prototype – LMP3	Konrad Motorsport	1	0	0	0	0	0	NC
2022	ADAC GT Masters	Montaplast by Land Motorsport	14	1	0	0	1	104	12th
2023	ADAC GT Masters	Huber Racing	6	1	0	0	2	91	8th
2023	Prototype Cup Germany	Konrad Motorsport	2	0	0	0	0	15	23rd
2023–24	Middle East Trophy – GT3 Pro	Huber Motorsport	1	0	0	0	0	14	NC
2024	ADAC GT Masters	GRT Grasser Racing Team	10	0	1	1	1	114	9th
2025	ADAC GT Masters	FK Performance Motorsport	12	2	1	3	4	165	**2nd**
2025	Lamborghini Super Trofeo Asia – Pro-Am	Z.SPEED	4	0	0	0	3	41	9th
2026	ADAC GT Masters	FK Performance Motorsport	12	3	0	0	7	214	**2nd**

=== Complete ADAC Formel Masters results ===
(key) (Races in bold indicate pole position) (Races in italics indicate fastest lap)

Year	Entrant	1	2	3	4	5	6	7	8	9	10	11	12	13	14	15	16	17	18	19	20	21	22	23	24	DC	Points
2014	Neuhauser Racing Team	OSC; 1; 3	OSC; 2; 7	OSC; 3; 2	ZAN; 1; 2	ZAN; 2; 6	ZAN; 3; 2	LAU; 1; 9	LAU; 2; 10	LAU; 3; 6	RBR; 1 Ret	RBR; 2; 5	RBR; 3; 5	**SVK**; **1**; 2	SVK; 2; 9	SVK; 3; 1	NÜR; 1; 4	NÜR; 2; 5	NÜR; 3; 2	SAC; 1; 3	SAC; 2; 3	SAC; 3; 5	HOC; 1; 5	HOC; 2; 5	HOC; 3; 2	3rd	224

=== Complete ADAC Formula 4 Championship results ===
(key) (Races in bold indicate pole position) (Races in italics indicate fastest lap)

Year	Team	1	2	3	4	5	6	7	8	9	10	11	12	13	14	15	16	17	18	19	20	21	22	23	24	DC	Points
2015	Neuhauser Racing	OSC1; 1; 8	OSC1; 2; 6	OSC1; 3; 32	RBR; 1; 5	RBR; 2; 2	RBR; 3 Ret	SPA; 1; 13	SPA; 2 Ret	SPA; 3; 6	LAU; 1; 12	LAU; 2; 7	LAU; 3; 4	NÜR; 1; 10	NÜR; 2; 27	NÜR; 3; 9	SAC; 1; 3	SAC; 2; 6	SAC; 3; 8	OSC2; 1; 6	OSC2; 2; 4	OSC2; 3; 2	HOC; 1; 4	HOC; 2; 7	HOC; 3 Ret	6th	152

=== Complete Italian Formula 4 Championship results ===
(key) (Races in bold indicate pole position) (Races in italics indicate fastest lap)

Year	Team	1	2	3	4	5	6	7	8	9	10	11	12	13	14	15	16	17	18	19	20	21	DC	Points
2015	Prema Powerteam	VAL; 1	VAL; 2	VAL; 3	MNZ; 1; 9	MNZ; 2; 20	MNZ; 3 Ret	IMO1; 1	IMO1; 2	IMO1; 3	MUG; 1	MUG; 2	MUG; 3	ADR; 1	ADR; 2	ADR; 3	IMO2; 1	IMO2; 2	IMO2; 3	MIS; 1	MIS; 2	MIS; 3	26th	2

=== Complete ADAC TCR Germany Touring Car Championship results ===
(key) (Races in bold indicate pole position) (Races in italics indicate fastest lap)

Year	Team	Car	1	2	3	4	5	6	7	8	9	10	11	12	13	14	DC	Points
2016	Junior Team Engstler	Volkswagen Golf GTI TCR	OSC1; 1 Ret^{3}	OSC1; 2 DNS	SAC; 1; 2^{4}	SAC; 2; 3	OSC2; 1 Ret	OSC2; 2; 3	RBR; 1; 9	RBR; 2 DSQ	NÜR; 1	NÜR; 2	ZAN; 1; 4	ZAN; 2; 4	HOC; 1 Ret	HOC; 2 Ret	8th	73
2017	Target Competition GER	Audi RS3 LMS TCR	OSC1; 1; 7	OSC1; 2; 2	RBR; 1 Ret	RBR; 2; 15	OSC2; 1; 5	OSC2; 2; 11	ZAN; 1; 17	ZAN; 2; 30	NÜR; 1; 11	NÜR; 2; 29	SAC; 1; 6	SAC; 2; 26	HOC; 1; 30	HOC; 2; 31	16th	141

=== Complete ADAC GT Masters results ===
(key) (Races in bold indicate pole position) (Races in italics indicate fastest lap)

Year	Team	Car	1	2	3	4	5	6	7	8	9	10	11	12	13	14	DC	Points
2020	GRT Grasser Racing Team	Lamborghini Huracán GT3 Evo	LAU1; 1; 15	LAU1; 2; 19	NÜR; 1; 15	NÜR; 2; 9	HOC; 1; 3	**HOC**; **2**; 5	SAC; 1; 4	SAC; 2 Ret	**RBR**; **1**; 7	**RBR**; **2**; 9	LAU2; 1; 21	LAU2; 2; 14	OSC; 1; 17	OSC; 2 Ret	13th	67
2021	GRT Grasser Racing Team	Lamborghini Huracán GT3 Evo	OSC; 1; 14	OSC; 2; 21	RBR; 1; 14	RBR; 2 Ret	ZAN; 1 Ret	ZAN; 2; 19	LAU; 1	LAU; 2	SAC; 1; 19	SAC; 2; 14	HOC; 1; 8	HOC; 2; 16	NÜR; 1 Ret	NÜR; 2 Ret	35th	14
2022	Montaplast by Land-Motorsport	Audi R8 LMS Evo II	OSC; 1; 12	OSC; 2; 12	RBR; 1; 13	RBR; 2; 13	ZAN; 1; 9	ZAN; 2; 4	NÜR; 1; 8	NÜR; 2; 18	LAU; 1; 8	LAU; 2; 1	SAC; 1; 8	**SAC**; **2**; 11	HOC; 1; 9	HOC; 2; 12	12th	104
2023	Huber Racing	Porsche 911 GT3 R (992)	HOC1; 1; 1^{2}	HOC1; 2; 5	NOR; 1; 7	NOR; 2; 3^{3}	**NÜR**; **1**; 5^{1}	NÜR; 2; 4	SAC; 1	SAC; 2	RBR; 1	RBR; 2	HOC2; 1	HOC2; 2			8th	91
2024	GRT Grasser Racing Team	Lamborghini Huracán GT3 Evo 2	OSC; 1; 11^{2}	OSC; 2; 5	ZAN; 1; 2^{3}	ZAN; 2; 10	**NÜR**; **1**; 5^{1}	NÜR; 2; 14	SPA; 1; 8^{3}	SPA; 2; 4	RBR; 1	RBR; 2	HOC; 1; 9	HOC; 2; 5			9th	114
2025	FK Performance Motorsport	BMW M4 GT3 Evo	LAU; 1; 6	LAU; 2; 8	ZAN; 1; 2	ZAN; 2; 1	NÜR; 1; 7	NÜR; 2; 4	SAL; 1; 6	**SAL**; **2**; 1^{1}	RBR; 1; 11^{3}	RBR; 2; 8	HOC; 1; 13	HOC; 2; 2^{2}			2nd	165
2026	FK Performance Motorsport	BMW M4 GT3 Evo	RBR; 1; 10	RBR; 2; 4	ZAN; 1; 1^{3}	ZAN; 2; 2^{3}	LAU; 1; 2^{3}	LAU; 2; 1^{2}	NÜR; 1; 3^{2}	NÜR; 2; 5	SAL; 1; 1	SAL; 2; 4	HOC; 1; 6	HOC; 2; 2			2nd	214

=== Complete IMSA SportsCar Championship results ===
(key) (Races in bold indicate pole position; results in italics indicate fastest lap)

Year	Team	Class	Make	Engine	1	2	3	4	5	6	7	8	9	10	11	12	Pos.	Points
2021	GRT Grasser Racing Team	GTD	Lamborghini Huracán GT3 Evo	Lamborghini 5.2 L V10	DAY; 19	SEB; 13	MOH	DET	WGL; 13	WGL	LIM	ELK	LGA	LBH	VIR	PET	39th	534

=== Complete GT World Challenge Europe results ===
==== GT World Challenge Europe Endurance Cup ====
(key) (Races in bold indicate pole position) (Races in italics indicate fastest lap)

Year	Team	Car	Class	1	2	3	4	5	6	7	Pos.	Points
2021	GRT Grasser Racing Team	Lamborghini Huracán GT3 Evo	Silver	MNZ; 27	LEC; 16	SPA; 6H; 46	SPA; 12H; 35	SPA; 24H; Ret	**NÜR**; 35	CAT; 38	22nd	20

=== Complete Prototype Cup Germany results ===
(key) (Races in bold indicate pole position) (Races in italics indicate fastest lap)

Year	Team	Car	Engine	1	2	3	4	5	6	7	8	9	10	11	12	DC	Points
2023	Konrad Motorsport	Ginetta G61-LT-P3	Nissan VK56DE 5.6 L V8	HOC; 1	HOC; 2	OSC; 1	OSC; 2	ZAN; 1	ZAN; 2	NOR; 1	NOR; 2	ASS; 1	ASS; 2	NÜR; 1; 10	NÜR; 2; 9	23rd	15
