= Dennis Marschall =

German racing driver (born 1996)

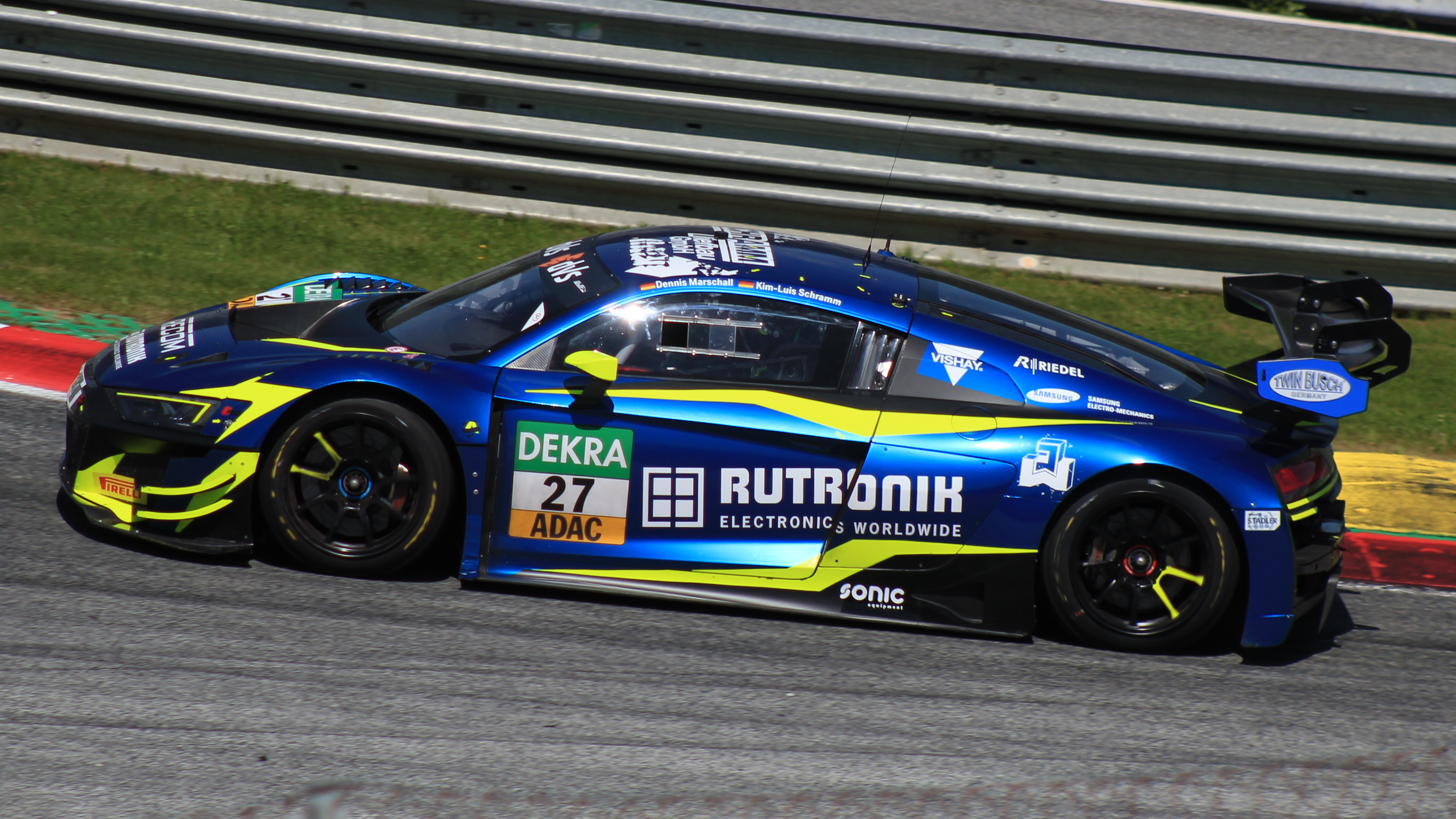
- Marschall racing in the ADAC GT Masters in 2022
- Nationality: (Germany) German
- Born: 15 August 1996 (age 30) Karlsruhe, Germany

ADAC GT Masters career
- Debut season: 2017
- Current team: Rutronik Racing by TECE
- Categorisation: FIA Silver (until 2021); FIA Gold (2022); FIA Platinum (2023–)
- Car number: 33
- Former teams: BMW Team Schnitzer; Aust Motorsport
- Starts: 69
- Wins: 0
- Podiums: 3
- Poles: 3
- Fastest laps: 2

Previous series
- 2015–2016 2014: Audi Sport TT Cup; ADAC Formel Masters

Dennis Marschall (born 15 August 1996) is a German racing driver who currently competes in the ADAC GT Masters.

Marschall won the 2024 24 Hours of Nürburgring for Scherer Sport PHX, driving alongside Ricardo Feller, Christopher Mies, and Frank Stippler.

== Career ==
=== Early career ===
Marschall began his racing career in karting at the age of 11, competing until 2013. He spent most of his karting career in the ADAC Kart Masters series, finishing as high as second in the KF3 class in 2010. In 2014, he stepped into single-seater racing, competing in the ADAC Formel Masters series for the Lotus-branded Motopark Academy team. Marschall would finish sixth in his opening season in the series with three race victories to his credit; one at EuroSpeedway Lausitz in May alongside a pair of victories at the Hockenheimring to close the season.

=== Sports car racing ===
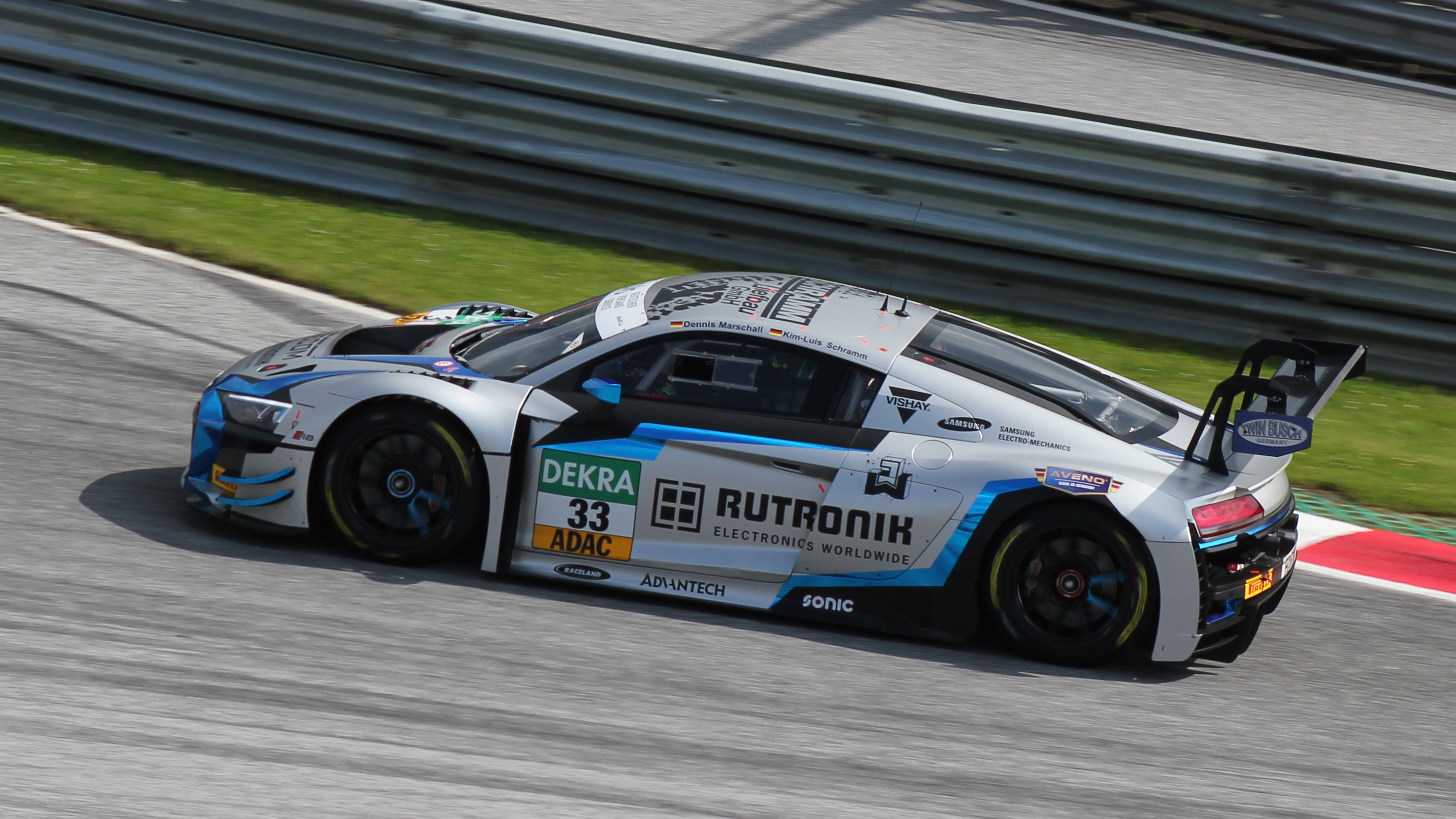
Marschall competing for Rutronik Racing in 2021

2015 saw Marschall leave the single-seater ranks after just one season, electing to compete in the opening season of the Audi Sport TT Cup. In two seasons of competition in the series, Marschall collected seven victories and fourteen podiums, finishing third and second in the overall championship before joining Aust Motorsport for the 2017 ADAC GT Masters season. In June of that year, Marschall joined the BMW Junior Program. As a result, Marschall moved to BMW Team Schnitzer for the 2018 ADAC GT Masters season, driving alongside Victor Bouveng. The duo would finish 28th in points, collecting a lone podium at the Red Bull Ring. The following season, Marschall joined Rutronik Racing, partnering with Carrie Schreiner. At Hockenheim in September, Marschall scored his first pole in the series, which he converted to the duo's only podium finish of the season.

For the 2021 season, Marschall was promoted to Audi factory driver status. In 2023, Marschall took on a full-time drive in the Pro class of the GT World Challenge Europe Endurance Cup, driving for Tresor Orange1 alongside fellow factory drivers Mattia Drudi and Ricardo Feller. The trio claimed a single podium finish at the Nürburgring, finishing fifth in the championship. Marschall also paired with Andrey Mukovoz in Sprint Cup competition, competing in the Bronze Cup. The duo claimed two class victories, with Marschall starting the latter on overall pole position, en route to a third-place championship finish.

The German returned to Rutronik in the Endurance Cup, driving in the Bronze Cup alongside Loek Hartog and Dustin Blattner. The entry claimed two class victories, at the Nürburgring and Jeddah, en route to a third-place finish in the Bronze Cup championship. Paired with Blattner in Sprint Cup competition, Marschall finished similarly, tallying two race victories and a third place championship finish. In June 2024, Marschall formed part of the Scherer Sport PHX team that won the shortest Nürburgring 24H in history, after over half of the race was red-flagged due to fog.

== Racing record ==
=== Career summary ===
Season	Series	Team	Races	Wins	Poles	F/Laps	Podiums	Points	Position
2014	ADAC Formel Masters	Lotus	24	3	0	1	6	164	6th
2015	Audi Sport TT Cup		12	1	0	2	6	186.5	**3rd**
2016	Audi Sport TT Cup		14	6	9	6	8	269	**2nd**
2017	ADAC GT Masters	Aust Motorsport	14	0	0	0	0	34	21st
2017	GT4 European Series Southern Cup - Pro-Am	Schubert Motorsport	2	1	0	0	1	0	NC†
2018	ADAC GT Masters	BMW Team Schnitzer	13	0	0	0	1	15	28th
2019	DMV Dunlop 60 - Class 2	HCB-Rutronik Racing	1	1	1	0	1	8.33	5th
2019	DMV Dunlop 60 - Class 1	HCB-Rutronik Racing	3	1	2	2	1	24.56	9th
2019	ADAC GT Masters	HCB-Rutronik Racing	14	0	1	1	1	22	24th
2019	DMV Gran Turismo Touring Car Cup - Class 1	HCB-Rutronik Racing	1	1	1	1	1	?	?
2019	VLN Series - SP8	WS Racing	1	0	0	0	0	0	NC
2020	ADAC GT Masters	Rutronik Racing	14	0	1	0	0	33	24th
2020	Intercontinental GT Challenge	Audi Sport Team WRT	1	0	0	0	0	0	NC
2020	Intercontinental GT Challenge	Car Collection Motorsport	1	0	0	0	0	0	NC
2020	GT World Challenge Europe Endurance Cup	Audi Sport Team WRT	1	0	0	0	0	0	NC
2021	ADAC GT Masters	Rutronik Racing by TECE	14	0	1	0	1	85	11th
2021	GT World Challenge Europe Sprint Cup	Attempto Racing	8	0	0	0	0	7.5	24th
2021	GT World Challenge Europe Sprint Cup - Silver	Attempto Racing	8	1	0	0	1	37.5	11th
2021	GT World Challenge Europe Endurance Cup	Attempto Racing	5	0	0	0	0	23	9th
2021	GT World Challenge Europe Endurance Cup - Silver	Attempto Racing	4	0	0	0	1	53	10th
2021	Intercontinental GT Challenge	Attempto Racing	1	0	0	0	0	6	18th
2021	Nürburgring Endurance Series - SP9	Audi Sport Team Car Collection; Audi Sport Team Phoenix	1	0	0	0	0	?	?
2021	24 Hours of Nürburgring - SP9	Phoenix-IronForce Racing	1	0	0	0	0	N/A	11th
2022	ADAC GT Masters	Rutronik Racing	14	0	0	1	2	120	6th
2022	GT World Challenge Europe Endurance Cup	Attempto Racing	5	0	0	0	1	19	20th
2022	GT World Challenge Europe Sprint Cup	Attempto Racing	10	0	0	0	1	30	8th
2022	Intercontinental GT Challenge	Audi Sport Team Attempto	1	0	0	0	0	4	20th
2022	Intercontinental GT Challenge	Audi Sport Team Tresor	1	0	0	0	0	4	20th
2022	24 Hours of Nürburgring - SP9	Lionspeed by Car Collection Motorsport	1	0	0	0	0	N/A	12th
2023	GT World Challenge Europe Endurance Cup	Tresor Orange1	5	0	0	0	1	47	5th
2023	GT World Challenge Europe Sprint Cup	Tresor Attempto Racing	6	0	1	1	0	1	22nd
2023	GT World Challenge Europe Sprint Cup - Bronze	Tresor Attempto Racing	6	2	2	5	4	54	**3rd**
2023	24 Hours of Nürburgring - SP9	Audi Sport Team Car Collection	1	0	0	0	0	N/A	13th
2023-24	Asian Le Mans Series - GT	Saintéloc Junior Team	3	0	0	0	1	27	10th
2023-24	Middle East Trophy - GT3	Car Collection Motorsport	2	1	0	0	1	60	**3rd**
2024	GT World Challenge Europe Endurance Cup	Rutronik Racing	5	0	0	0	0	0	NC
2024	GT World Challenge Europe Endurance Cup - Bronze	Rutronik Racing	5	2	2	0	2	71	**3rd**
2024	GT World Challenge Europe Sprint Cup	Rutronik Racing	7	0	0	1	0	0	NC
2024	GT World Challenge Europe Sprint Cup - Bronze	Rutronik Racing	7	2	1	3	3	61.5	**3rd**
2024	Nürburgring Langstrecken-Serie - SP9	Scherer Sport PHX	2	0	0	0	0	?	?
2024	24 Hours of Nürburgring - SP9	Scherer Sport PHX	1	1	0	0	1	N/A	**1st**
2024	Italian GT Sprint Championship - GT3 Pro-Am	Fach Auto Tech	2	1	1	1	1	32	NC
2024	Gulf 12 Hours	Saintéloc Racing	1	1	0	0	1	N/A	**1st**
2024-25	Asian Le Mans Series - GT	Kessel Racing	6	0	0	0	2	54	4th
2025	Middle East Trophy - GT3	Tresor Attempto Racing							
2025	Nürburgring Langstrecken-Serie - SP9	Falken Motorsports							
2025	24 Hours of Nürburgring - SP9	Falken Motorsports	1	0	0	0	0	N/A	DNF
2025	GT World Challenge Europe Endurance Cup	Kessel Racing	5	0	0	0	0	0	NC
2025	GT World Challenge Europe Endurance Cup - Bronze	Kessel Racing	5	2	1	0	3	97	**1st**
2025	GT World Challenge Europe Sprint Cup	Kessel Racing	8	0	1	2	0	5.5	22nd
2025	GT World Challenge Europe Sprint Cup - Bronze	Kessel Racing	8	3	5	3	6	92	**1st**
2025-26	Asian Le Mans Series - GT	Kessel Racing	6	2	0	0	3	94	**1st**
2025-26	24H Series Middle East - GT3	AlManar Racing by Dragon	1	0	0	0	0	0	NC
2026	24H Series - GT3	Proton Competition	1	0	0	0	0	6	40th
2026	Nürburgring Langstrecken-Serie - SP9	Realize Kondo Racing with Rinaldi							
2026	24 Hours of Nürburgring - SP9	Realize Kondo Racing with Rinaldi	1	0	0	0	0	N/A	DNF
2026	GT World Challenge Europe Endurance Cup	Kessel Racing	5	0	0	1	0	17	13th
2026	GT World Challenge Europe Endurance Cup - Bronze	Kessel Racing	5	2	1	1	3	112	NC‡
2026	GT World Challenge Europe Sprint Cup	Kessel Racing	8	0	0	0	0	1	29th
2026	GT World Challenge Europe Sprint Cup - Bronze	Kessel Racing	8	0	0	3	4	59.5	5th
2026	24 Hours of Le Mans - LMGT3	Kessel Racing	1	0	0	0	0	N/A	9th
2026	China GT Championship - GT3	Apex Predator Racing							
2026	International GT Open	Al Manar by Dragon Racing	1	0	0	0	0	2	40th
2026-27	Asian Le Mans Series - GT3	Garage 59							

^{†} As Marschall was a guest driver, he was ineligible for points.
^{‡} Ineligible to win the championship as a solo Platinum-rated driver.
^{*} Season still in progress.

=== Complete ADAC Formel Masters results ===
(key) (Races in bold indicate pole position) (Races in italics indicate fastest lap)

Year	Team	1	2	3	4	5	6	7	8	9	10	11	12	13	14	15	16	17	18	19	20	21	22	23	24	DC	Points
2014	ADAC Berlin-Brandenburg	OSC; 1; 4	OSC; 2; 6	OSC; 3; 6	ZAN; 1; 6	ZAN; 2; 9	ZAN; 3 Ret	LAU; 1; 12	LAU; 2; 8	LAU; 3; 1	RBR; 1; 13	RBR; 2; 10	RBR; 3; 10	SVK; 1; 3	SVK; 2; 7	SVK; 3; 3	NÜR; 1; 5	NÜR; 2 Ret	NÜR; 3; 10	SAC; 1 Ret	SAC; 2; 5	SAC; 3 Ret	HOC; 1; 1	HOC; 2; 2	HOC; 3; 1	6th	164

=== Complete ADAC GT Masters results ===
(key) (Races in bold indicate pole position) (Races in italics indicate fastest lap)

Year	Team	Car	1	2	3	4	5	6	7	8	9	10	11	12	13	14	DC	Points
2017	Aust Motorsport	Audi R8 LMS	OSC; 1; 24	OSC; 2 Ret	LAU; 1 Ret	LAU; 2; 8	RBR; 1; 15	RBR; 2; 11	ZAN; 1; 11	ZAN; 2; 7	NÜR; 1; 4	NÜR; 2; 5	SAC; 1; 21	SAC; 2; 10	HOC; 1; 13	HOC; 2; 10	21st	34
2018	BMW Team Schnitzer	BMW M6 GT3	OSC; 1; 15	OSC; 2; 20	MST; 1 DNS	MST; 2 Ret	RBR; 1; 3	RBR; 2; 28	NÜR; 1; 23	NÜR; 2; 29	ZAN; 1; 27	ZAN; 2; 19	SAC; 1; 27	SAC; 2; 16	HOC; 1; 11	HOC; 2; 11	28th	15
2019	HCB-Rutronik Racing	Audi R8 LMS Evo	OSC; 1; 25	OSC; 2; 22	MST; 1 Ret	MST; 2; 15	RBR; 1 Ret	RBR; 2 Ret	ZAN; 1; 14	ZAN; 2; 19	NÜR; 1; 14	NÜR; 2; 17	**HOC**; **1**; 3	HOC; 2 Ret	SAC; 1 DNS	SAC; 2; 25	24th	22
2020	Rutronik Racing	Audi R8 LMS Evo	LAU; 1 Ret	LAU; 2 Ret	NÜR; 1; 8	NÜR; 2; 26	**HOC**; **1**; 10	HOC; 2; 17	SAC; 1; 21	**SAC**; **2**; 8	RBR; 1; 22	RBR; 2; 14	LAU; 1; 7	LAU; 2; 27†	OSC; 1; 25	OSC; 2; 19	24th	33
2021	Rutronik Racing by TECE	Audi R8 LMS Evo	OSC; 1; 6	OSC; 2 Ret	RBR; 1; 8	**RBR**; **2**; 2^{1}	ZAN; 1; 10	ZAN; 2; 6	LAU; 1; 14	LAU; 2; 8	SAC; 1; 12	SAC; 2; 19	HOC; 1; 14	HOC; 2; 18	NÜR; 1; 8	NÜR; 2; 12	11th	85
2022	Rutronik Racing	Audi R8 LMS Evo II	OSC; 1; 8	OSC; 2; 7	RBR; 1 DSQ	RBR; 2; 6	ZAN; 1; 2	ZAN; 2; 6	NÜR; 1; 13	NÜR; 2; 7	LAU; 1; 9	LAU; 2; 6	SAC; 1; 3^{3}	SAC; 2; 14†^{2}	HOC; 1; 11	HOC; 2; 8	6th	120

=== Complete GT World Challenge Europe results ===
(key) (Races in bold indicate pole position) (Races in italics indicate fastest lap)

==== GT World Challenge Europe Endurance Cup ====
Year	Team	Car	Class	1	2	3	4	5	6	7	Pos.	Points
2020	Audi Sport Team WRT	Audi R8 LMS Evo	Pro	IMO	NÜR	SPA; 6H; 29	SPA; 12H; 21	SPA; 24H; 14	LEC		NC	0
2021	Attempto Racing	Audi R8 LMS Evo	Silver	MON; 15	LEC; 18				NÜR; 9	CAT; 15	10th	53
2021	Attempto Racing	Audi R8 LMS Evo	Pro			SPA; 6H; 29	SPA; 12H; 5	SPA; 24H; 9			9th	23
2022	Attempto Racing	Audi R8 LMS Evo II	Pro	IMO; Ret	LEC; 10	SPA; 6H; 36	SPA; 12H; 26	SPA; 24H; 12	HOC; 2	CAT; Ret	20th	19
2023	Tresor Orange1	Audi R8 LMS Evo II	Pro	MNZ; 5	LEC; Ret	SPA; 6H; 6	SPA; 12H; 1	SPA; 24H; 7	NÜR; 3	CAT; Ret	5th	47
2024	Rutronik Racing	Porsche 911 GT3 R (992)	Bronze	LEC; 31	SPA; 6H; Ret	SPA; 12H; Ret	SPA; 24H; Ret	**NÜR**; 22	MNZ; 17	**JED**; 17	3rd	71
2025	Kessel Racing	Ferrari 296 GT3	Bronze	LEC; 26	MNZ; 29	SPA; 6H; 10	SPA; 12H; 16	SPA; 24H; 15	**NÜR**; Ret	BAR; 18	1st	97
2026	Kessel Racing	Ferrari 296 GT3 Evo	Bronze	LEC; 28	MNZ; 8	SPA; 6H; 14	SPA; 12H; 1	**SPA**; **24H**; 10	NÜR; 26	ALG; 33	NC‡	112

^{‡} Ineligible to win the championship as a solo Platinum-rated driver.
^{*} Season still in progress.

==== GT World Challenge Europe Sprint Cup ====
Year	Team	Car	Class	1	2	3	4	5	6	7	8	9	10	Pos.	Points
2021	Attempto Racing	Audi R8 LMS Evo	Silver	MAG; 1	MAG; 2	ZAN; 1; 17	ZAN; 2; 12	MIS; 1; 13	MIS; 2 Ret	BRH; 1; 13	BRH; 2; 13	VAL; 1; 4	VAL; 2; 24	11th	37.5
2022	Attempto Racing	Audi R8 LMS Evo II	Pro	BRH; 1; 9	BRH; 2; 12	MAG; 1; 13	MAG; 2; 7	ZAN; 1; 6	ZAN; 2; 3	MIS; 1; 5	MIS; 2 Ret	VAL; 1; 5	VAL; 2; 11	8th	30
2023	Tresor Attempto Racing	Audi R8 LMS Evo II	Bronze	MIS; 1; 36	MIS; 2; 22	**HOC**; **1**; 18	HOC; 2 DSQ	**VAL**; **1**; 18	VAL; 2; 23					3rd	54
2024	Rutronik Racing	Porsche 911 GT3 R (992)	Bronze	MIS; 1 DNS	MIS; 2; 23	HOC; 1; 27	HOC; 2; 19	MAG; 1; 20	MAG; 2; 17	CAT; 1; 23	**CAT**; **2**; 16			3rd	61.5
2025	Kessel Racing	Ferrari 296 GT3	Bronze	ZAN; 1; 23	**ZAN**; **2**; 22	**MIS**; **1**; 15	**MIS**; **2**; 38	MAG; 1; 30	**MAG**; **2**; 24	**VAL**; **1**; 6	VAL; 2; 25			1st	92
2026	Kessel Racing	Ferrari 296 GT3 Evo	Bronze	MIS; 1; 24	MIS; 2; 34	MAG; 1; 23	MAG; 2 Ret	ZAN; 1; 38	ZAN; 2; 27	CAT; 1; 9	CAT; 2; 21			5th	59.5

=== Complete 24 Hours of Nürburgring results ===
Year	Team	Co-Drivers	Car	Class	Laps	Pos.	Class Pos.
2021	(Germany) Phoenix-IronForce Racing	(Austria) Max Hofer (Germany) Vincent Kolb (Germany) Jan-Erik Slooten	Audi R8 LMS Evo II	SP9	58	11th	11th
2022	(Germany) Lionspeed by Car Collection Motorsport	(Germany) Dennis Fetzer (Germany) Klaus Koch (Austria) Simon Reicher	Audi R8 LMS Evo II	SP9 Pro-Am	154	13th	4th
2023	(Germany) Audi Sport Team Car Collection	(Germany) Luca Engstler (Switzerland) Max Hofer (Belgium) Gilles Magnus	Audi R8 LMS Evo II	SP9 Pro	159	13th	11th
2024	(Germany) Scherer Sport PHX	(Switzerland) Ricardo Feller (Germany) Christopher Mies (Germany) Frank Stippler	Audi R8 LMS Evo II	SP9 Pro	50	**1st**	**1st**
2025	(Germany) Falken Motorsports	(France) Dorian Boccolacci (Germany) Tim Heinemann (Netherlands) Morris Schuring	Porsche 911 GT3 R (992)	SP9 Pro	89	DNF	DNF
2026	(Japan) Realize Kondo Racing with Rinaldi	(France) Thomas Neubauer (South Africa) David Perel (Netherlands) Thierry Vermeulen	Ferrari 296 GT3 Evo	SP9 Pro	14	DNF	DNF

=== Complete Asian Le Mans Series results ===
(key) (Races in bold indicate pole position) (Races in italics indicate fastest lap)

Year	Team	Class	Car	Engine	1	2	3	4	5	6	Pos.	Points
2023–24	Saintéloc Racing	GT	Audi R8 LMS Evo II	Audi DAR 5.2 L V10	SEP; 1; 3	SEP; 2; 13	DUB; 4	ABU; 1 WD	ABU; 2 WD		10th	27
2024–25	Kessel Racing	GT	Ferrari 296 GT3	Ferrari F163 3.0 L Turbo V6	SEP; 1; 6	SEP; 2; 12	**DUB**; **1**; 3	**DUB**; **2**; 10	ABU; 1; 4	ABU; 2; 3	4th	54
2025–26	Kessel Racing	GT	Ferrari 296 GT3	Ferrari F163 3.0 L Turbo V6	SEP; 1; 5	SEP; 2; 1	DUB; 1; 1	DUB; 2; 4	ABU; 1; 3	ABU; 2; 9	1st	94
2026–27	Garage 59	GT	McLaren 720S GT3 Evo	McLaren M840T 4.0 L Turbo V8	LEC; 1; 18	LEC; 2; 1	JER; 1	JER; 2	ALG; 1	ALG; 2	3rd*	25*

=== Complete 24 Hours of Le Mans results ===
Year	Team	Co-Drivers	Car	Class	Laps	Pos.	Class Pos.
2026	(Switzerland) Kessel Racing	(United States) Dustin Blattner (Italy) Lorenzo Patrese	Ferrari 296 GT3 Evo	LMGT3	334	41st	9th
