= 2021 12 Hours of Sebring =

69th 12 Hours of Sebring race

Sebring International Raceway

The 2021 12 Hours of Sebring (formally known as the 69th Mobil 1 Twelve Hours of Sebring Presented by Advance Auto Parts) was an endurance sports car race held at Sebring International Raceway near Sebring, Florida from 17 to 20 March 2021. It was the second round of both the 2021 WeatherTech SportsCar Championship and the Michelin Endurance Cup. Mazda Motorsports entered as the defending overall winners of the 12-hour event.

== Background ==
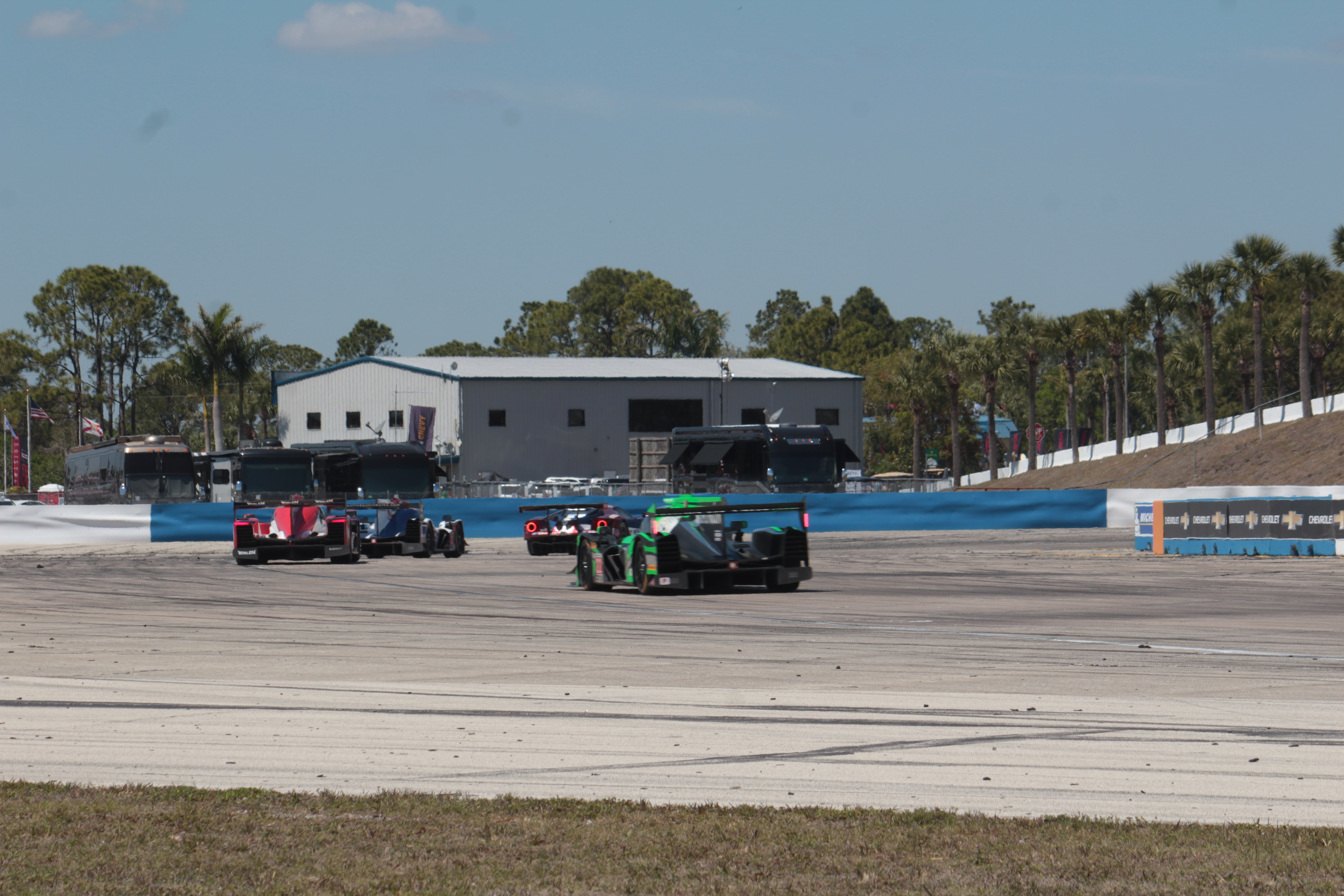
Sebring International Raceway, where the race was held.

International Motor Sports Association's (IMSA) president John Doonan confirmed the race was part of the schedule for the 2021 IMSA SportsCar Championship (IMSA SCC) in September 2020. It was the eighth consecutive year it was part of the IMSA SCC, and 69th 12 Hours of Sebring. The 12 Hours of Sebring was the second of twelve sports car endurance races of 2021 by IMSA, and the second of four races of the Michelin Endurance Cup (MEC). It was held at the 17-turn, 3.741-mile (6.021 km) Sebring International Raceway in Sebring, Florida on March 20, 2021.

After being postponed to November the previous year due to the COVID-19 pandemic, the race returned to its traditional March date for 2021. Originally, the 1000 Miles of Sebring, the FIA World Endurance Championship event run in conjunction with the 12 Hours in 2019, was slated to return, but was later cancelled due to international travel restrictions still imposed by the pandemic.

Supporting the race during the week were IMSA's Michelin Pilot Challenge series, Porsche Carrera Cup North America series, and Mazda MX-5 Cup series.

The race would see the debut of the new for 2021 GTD qualifying format, with two sessions for the category. The first session would mandate any bronze/silver driver to qualify their car and determine the starting lineup for the race. The second session would see each team allow to change tires and drivers, and championship points would be awarded.

Before the race, Filipe Albuquerque, Hélio Castroneves, Alexander Rossi, and Ricky Taylor led the DPi Drivers' Championship with 376 points, ahead of Jimmie Johnson, Kamui Kobayashi, Simon Pagenaud, and Mike Rockenfeller in second with 345 points. Nicky Catsburg, Antonio García, and Jordan Taylor led the GTLM Drivers' Championship with 382 points, 27 points ahead of Tommy Milner, Alexander Sims, and Nick Tandy. With 376 points, the GTD Drivers' Championship was led by Indy Dontje, Philip Ellis, Maro Engel, and Russell Ward. Acura, Chevrolet, and Mercedes-AMG were leading their respective Manufacturers' Championships while WTR-Konica Minolta Acura, Corvette Racing, and Winward Racing each led their own Teams' Championships. LMP2 drivers and teams as well as LMP3 drivers and teams would be scoring their first championship points of the season due to Daytona only counting towards the Michelin Endurance Cup championship.

=== Entries ===
A total of 37 cars took part in the event split across five classes. 7 cars were entered in DPi, 5 in LMP2, 7 in LMP3, 5 in GTLM, and 13 in GTD. In DPi, Action Express Racing confirmed their #48 entry would contest the remaining Michelin Endurance Cup events. In LMP2, High Class Racing, Racing Team Nederland, Cetilar Racing, RWR Eurasia, and DragonSpeed USA skipped the event. United Autosports made their first start in the IMSA WeatherTech SportsCar Championship since 2018. In LMP3, Mühlner Motorsports America were absent while WIN Autosport made their class debut. Oliver Askew and Stevan McAleer joined Austin McCusker in the Forty7 Motorsports entry. Dan Goldburg joined Mateo Llarena and Rasmus Lindh in the Performance Tech Motorsports entry. In GTLM, Risi Competizione were absent. Matt Campbell and Mathieu Jaminet joined Cooper MacNeil in the WeatherTech Racing entry. In GTD, AF Corse, NTE Sport, HTP Winward Motorsport, Scuderia Corsa, Team TGM, and TF Sport were absent while GRT Grasser Racing Team scaled down to one entry. Stephen Simpson subbed for Misha Goikhberg in the #19 GRT Grasser Racing Team entry. Michael de Quesada joined Daniel Morad and Billy Johnson in the Alegra Motorsports entry. Maro Engel joined Mikaël Grenier and Kenny Habul in the SunEnergy1 Racing entry. Trent Hindman subbed for Ryan Hardwick in the Wright Motorsports entry. Team Hardpoint EBM added a second entry featuring Earl Bamber, Trenton Estep, and Rob Ferriol.

== Practice ==
There were three practice sessions preceding the start of the race on Saturday, all three one on Thursday. The first session on Thursday morning lasted one hour. The second session on Thursday afternoon ran for 75 minutes while the final session on Thursday evening ran for 90 minutes.

In the first session, Felipe Nasr's No. 31 Cadillac lapped quickest at 1:46.212, 0.407 seconds ahead of CGR's Renger van der Zande. Dane Cameron was third in MSR's No. 60 Acura. Vautier's No. 5 Cadillac, along with Ricky Taylor's WTR Acura were fourth and fifth. The quickest LMP2 lap was set by Mikkel Jensen in PR1's Oreca. Jeroen Bleekemolen led LMP3 in Riley Motorsports' No. 91 Ligier. The quickest GTLM entry was the No. 3 Corvette of Jordan Taylor, whose 1:56.715 lap led Mathieu Jaminet's second-placed WeatherTech Porsche. With a 2:00.456 lap, Bill Auberlen led the 13-car GTD class in Turner Motorsports' No. 96 BMW M6 by 0.207 seconds over Jack Hawksworth's No. 14 Lexus.

In the second session, Nasr's No. 31 WER Cadillac set the fastest overall lap of 1 minute, 47.323 seconds. Duval was 0.181 seconds behind in second, with the No. 55 Mazda of Jarvis in third. Kevin Magnussen fourth in CGR's No. 01 Cadillac and Albuquerque's WTR Acura was fifth. Jensen led in LMP2 with a 1:50.224 lap in PR1's car, 0.456 seconds ahead of Tristan Nunez in WIN Autosport's second-placed No. 11 entry. The quickest LMP3 lap was set by Dylan Murry in Riley Motorsports' No. 91 Ligier, and Pigot was second in the sister No. 74 Riley Motorsport Ligier. Campbell's 1:56.891 lap led the GTLM class in WeatherTech Racing's Porsche, 0.573 seconds faster than Connor De Phillippi's No. 25 BMW; Nick Tandy's No. 4 Corvette was third. GTD saw Mikaël Grenier's SunEnergy1 Mercedes-AMG record the fastest class lap: 2:01.111, 0.208 seconds faster than Foley's No. 96 Turner Motorsport BMW.

Pipo Derani led the last practice session in the No. 31 WER car with a lap of 1 minute, 46.898 seconds. van der Zande's No. 01 CGR car was second-fastest. The No. 10 Acura of Ricky Taylor set the third-quickest lap. Kobayashi's No. 48 Ally Cadillac, along with Bourdais' No. 5 JDC car were fourth and fifth. Jensen's No. 52 PR1 car led LMP2 with a 1:50.270 lap, faster than Boyd's No. 22 United Autosports vehicle. Riley Motorsports occupied first and second in LMP3 with Bleekemolen faster than his teammate Pigot by 0.525 seconds. In GTLM, Jaminet was fastest again in the class with a lap of 1 minute, 56.563 seconds. García was second-fastest in the No. 3 Corvette, and his teammate Sims took third in the sister No. 4 car. Vanthoor set the fastest time in GTD, followed by Aaron Telitz's No. 14 VSR Lexus.

== Qualifying ==
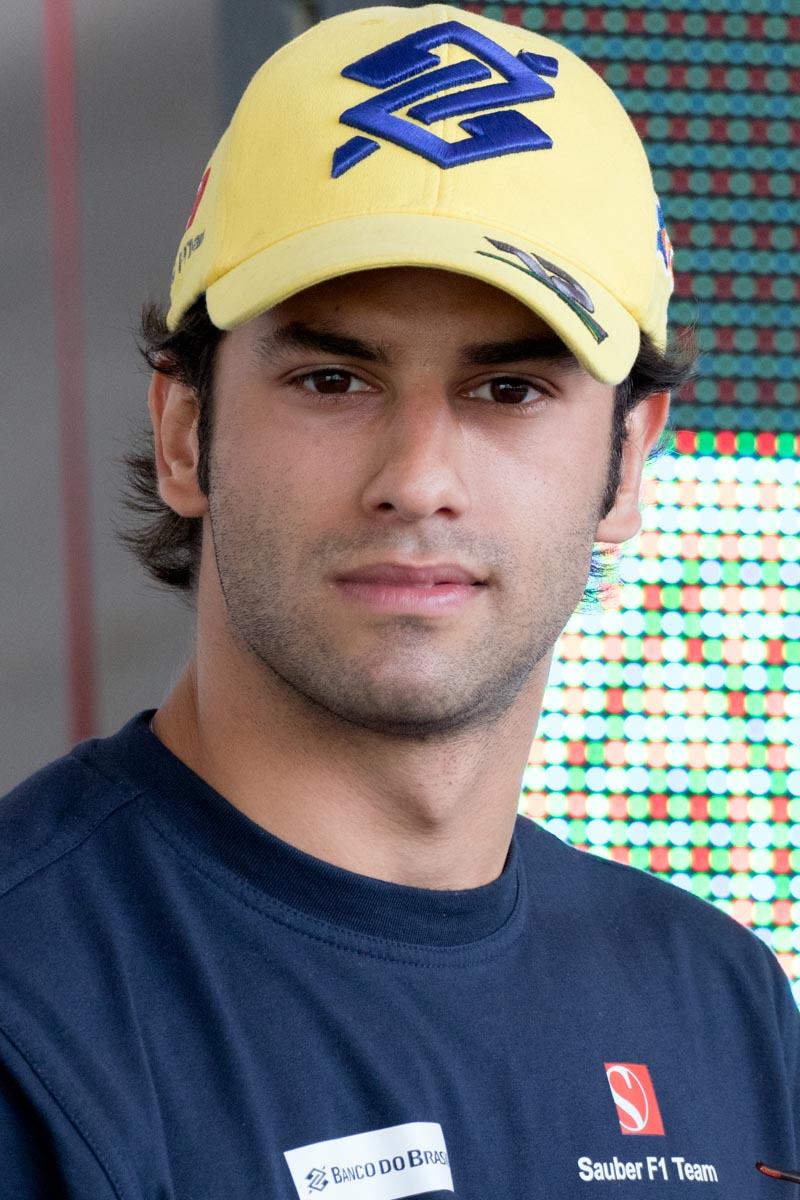
Felipe Nasr (pictured in 2015) helped take the No. 31 Cadillac's second pole position of 2021.

Qualifying was broken into four sessions. The first was for cars in GTD class. Tim Zimmermann set the fastest time driving the #19 car for GRT Grasser Racing Team. However, the team were sent to the back of the GTD grid after the team's Lamborghini was found to have a wifi hotspot onboard. As a result, Jan Heylen was promoted to pole position. Zacharie Robichon suffered an ABS failure on his #9 Porsche and touched the tire barrier at turn 13. Robichon went off at the same part of the track on his second lap and didn't set a competitive time.

The second session was for cars in the GTLM and GTD classes. Antonio García qualified on pole in GTLM driving the #3 car for Corvette Racing, beating teammate Tommy Milner in the sister #4 Corvette Racing entry by less than 0.050 seconds. Jack Hawksworth set the fastest time in the GTD points paying session and earned 35 championship points.

The third session was for cars in the LMP3 class. Rasmus Lindh qualified on pole for the class driving the #38 car for Performance Tech Motorsports, beating Oliver Askew in the Forty7 Motorsports entry by less than one-tenth of a second.

The final session of qualifying was for cars in the DPi and LMP2 classes. Pipo Derani took overall pole for the event driving the #31 car for Whelen Engineering Racing, besting Ricky Taylor in the WTR-Konica Minolta Acura entry. Steven Thomas qualified on pole in LMP2 driving the WIN Autosport Oreca. Jimmie Johnson, driving the #48 Ally Cadillac Racing entry, spun at turn 16 in the closing moments of the session and attempted to get one more lap in. However, Johnson crashed at turn 17 and the #48 Cadillac suffered extensive damage. Due to the damage from the accident, Ally Cadillac Racing would use a spare tub for the race. For causing a red flag, Johnson had his best two laps from the session deleted.

=== Qualifying results ===
Pole positions in each class are indicated in bold and by ‡.

Pos.	Class	No.	Team	Driver	Time	Gap	Grid
1	**DPi**	**31**	**(United States) Whelen Engineering Racing**	**(Brazil) Felipe Nasr**	**1:45.354**	**_**	1‡
2	DPi	10	(United States) WTR-Konica Minolta Acura	(United States) Ricky Taylor	1:45.464	+0.110	2
3	DPi	01	(United States) Cadillac Chip Ganassi Racing	(Netherlands) Renger van der Zande	1:45.849	+0.495	3
4	DPi	55	(Japan) Mazda Motorsports	(United Kingdom) Oliver Jarvis	1:46.253	+0.899	4
5	DPi	60	(United States) Meyer Shank Racing with Curb-Agajanian	(France) Olivier Pla	1:46.377	+1.023	5
6	DPi	5	(United States) JDC-Mustang Sampling Racing	(France) Loïc Duval	1:46.549	+1.195	6
7	DPi	48	(United States) Ally Cadillac Racing	(United States) Jimmie Johnson	1:47.610^{1}	+2.256	7
8	**LMP2**	**11**	**(United States) WIN Autosport**	**(United States) Steven Thomas**	**1:51.025**	**+5.671**	8‡
9	LMP2	52	(United States) PR1/Mathiasen Motorsports	(United States) Ben Keating	1:51.148	+5.794	9
10	LMP2	18	(United States) Era Motorsport	(United States) Dwight Merriman	1:52.388	+7.034	10
11	**GTLM**	**3**	**(United States) Corvette Racing**	**(Spain) Antonio García**	**1:54.910**	**+9.556**	20‡
12	GTLM	4	(United States) Corvette Racing	(United States) Tommy Milner	1:54.944	+9.590	21
13	GTLM	25	(United States) BMW Team RLL	(United States) Connor De Phillippi	1:55.062	+9.708	22
14	GTLM	24	(United States) BMW Team RLL	(Finland) Jesse Krohn	1:55.281	+9.927	23
15	LMP2	22	(United Kingdom) United Autosports	(United States) James McGuire	1:55.440	+10.086	11
16	**LMP3**	**38**	**(United States) Performance Tech Motorsports**	**(Sweden) Rasmus Lindh**	**1:56.001**	**+10.647**	13‡
17	LMP3	7	(United States) Forty7 Motorsports	(United States) Oliver Askew	1:56.066	+10.712	14
18	GTLM	79	(United States) WeatherTech Racing	(United States) Cooper MacNeil	1:56.119	+10.765	24
19	LMP2	8	(United States) Tower Motorsport By Starworks	(Canada) John Farano	1:56.142	+10.788	12
20	LMP3	74	(United States) Riley Motorsports	(United States) Gar Robinson	1:56.974	+11.620	15
21	LMP3	54	(United States) CORE Autosport	(United States) Jon Bennett	1:58.151	+12.797	16
22	LMP3	91	(United States) Riley Motorsports	(United States) Jim Cox	1:58.546	+13.192	17
23	LMP3	33	(United States) Sean Creech Motorsport	(United States) Lance Willsey	1:58.991	+13.637	18
24	LMP3	83	(United States) WIN Autosport	(Mexico) Rodrigo Sales	1:59.950	+14.596	19
25	GTD	19	(Austria) GRT Grasser Racing Team	(Germany) Tim Zimmermann	2:00.010	+14.656	37^{2}
26	**GTD**	**16**	**(United States) Wright Motorsports**	**(Belgium) Jan Heylen**	**2:00.077**	**+14.723**	25‡
27	GTD	28	(United States) Alegra Motorsports	(Canada) Daniel Morad	2:00.272	+14.918	26
28	GTD	14	(United States) Vasser Sullivan Racing	(United States) Aaron Telitz	2:00.504	+15.150	27
29	GTD	12	(United States) Vasser Sullivan Racing	(United States) Frankie Montecalvo	2:00.790	+15.436	28
30	GTD	96	(United States) Turner Motorsport	(United States) Robby Foley	2:00.791	+15.437	29
31	GTD	1	(United States) Paul Miller Racing	(United States) Madison Snow	2:01.518	+16.164	30
32	GTD	75	(Australia) SunEnergy1 Racing	(Australia) Kenny Habul	2:01.684	+16.330	31
33	GTD	23	(United States) Heart Of Racing Team	(United Kingdom) Ian James	2:01.698	+16.344	32
34	GTD	88	(United States) Team Hardpoint EBM	(Denmark) Christina Nielsen	2:02.613	+17.259	33
35	GTD	99	(United States) Team Hardpoint EBM	(United States) Rob Ferriol	2:03.144	+17.790	34
36	GTD	44	(United States) Magnus Racing with Archangel Motorsports	(United States) John Potter	2:03.367	+18.013	35
37	GTD	9	(Canada) Pfaff Motorsports	(Canada) Zacharie Robichon	3:07.086	+1:21.732	36
Sources:

- ^{1} The No. 48 Ally Cadillac Racing entry had its two fastest laps deleted as penalty for causing a red flag during its qualifying session.
- ^{2} The No. 19 GRT Grasser Racing Team entry initially qualified on pole position for the GTD class. However, the car was found to have a wifi hotspot onboard. By IMSA rules, the entry was moved to the rear of the GTD field on the starting grid.

== Post-race ==
The result kept Filipe Albuquerque, Alexander Rossi, and Ricky Taylor atop the DPi Drivers' Championship with 688 points. Bourdais, Duval, and Vautier advanced from sixth to second while Johnson, Kobayashi, and Pagenaud dropped from second to fifth. Bomarito, Jarvis, and Tincknell jumped from third to second. Since it was the season's first points paying race, Huffaker, Jensen, and Keating led the LMP2 Drivers' Championship with 382 points. Since it was the season's first points paying race, Bennett, Braun, and Kurtz led the LMP3 Drivers' Championship with 378 points. As a result of winning the race, MacNeil advanced from sixth to second in the GTLM Drivers' Championship. Milner, Sims, and Tandy dropped from second to fourth. As a result of winning the race, Long, Hindman, and Heylen advanced from fourth to first in the GTD Drivers' Championship. Grenier and Habul dropped from second to fifth while Kern, Robichon, and Vanthoor advanced from eleventh to fourth. Cadillac and Porsche took the lead in their respective Manufacturers' Championships while Chevrolet continued to top the GTLM Manufacturers' Championship. WTR-Konica Minolta Acura and Corvette Racing continued to top their respective Teams' Championships while Wright Motorsports took the lead of the GTD Teams' Championship. PR1/Mathiasen Motorsports and CORE Autosport became the leaders of their respective class Teams' Championships with ten rounds remaining in the season.

=== Race results ===
Class winners are denoted in bold and ‡.

Pos	Class	No	Team	Drivers	Chassis	Laps	Time/Retired
Pos	Class	No	Team	Drivers	Engine	Laps	Time/Retired
1	**DPi**	**5**	**(United States) JDC-Mustang Sampling Racing**	**(France) Sébastien Bourdais (France) Loïc Duval (France) Tristan Vautier**	**Cadillac DPi-V.R**	**349**	**12:01:01.418‡**
1	**DPi**	**5**	**(United States) JDC-Mustang Sampling Racing**	**(France) Sébastien Bourdais (France) Loïc Duval (France) Tristan Vautier**	**Cadillac 5.5 L V8**	**349**	**12:01:01.418‡**
2	DPi	55	(Canada) Mazda Motorsports	(United States) Jonathan Bomarito (United Kingdom) Oliver Jarvis (United Kingdom) Harry Tincknell	Mazda RT24-P	349	+1.435
2	DPi	55	(Canada) Mazda Motorsports	(United States) Jonathan Bomarito (United Kingdom) Oliver Jarvis (United Kingdom) Harry Tincknell	Mazda MZ-2.0T 2.0 L Turbo I4	349	+1.435
3	DPi	60	(United States) Meyer Shank Racing w/ Curb-Agajanian	(United States) Dane Cameron (Colombia) Juan Pablo Montoya (France) Olivier Pla	Acura ARX-05	349	+2.614
3	DPi	60	(United States) Meyer Shank Racing w/ Curb-Agajanian	(United States) Dane Cameron (Colombia) Juan Pablo Montoya (France) Olivier Pla	Acura AR35TT 3.5 L Turbo V6	349	+2.614
4	DPi	10	(United States) WTR-Konica Minolta Acura	(Portugal) Filipe Albuquerque (United States) Alexander Rossi (United States) Ricky Taylor	Acura ARX-05	349	+5.318
4	DPi	10	(United States) WTR-Konica Minolta Acura	(Portugal) Filipe Albuquerque (United States) Alexander Rossi (United States) Ricky Taylor	Acura AR35TT 3.5 L Turbo V6	349	+5.318
5	DPi	01	(United States) Cadillac Chip Ganassi Racing	(New Zealand) Scott Dixon (Denmark) Kevin Magnussen (Netherlands) Renger van der Zande	Cadillac DPi-V.R	347	+2 Laps
5	DPi	01	(United States) Cadillac Chip Ganassi Racing	(New Zealand) Scott Dixon (Denmark) Kevin Magnussen (Netherlands) Renger van der Zande	Cadillac 5.5 L V8	347	+2 Laps
6	**LMP2**	**52**	**(United States) PR1/Mathiasen Motorsports**	**(United States) Scott Huffaker (Denmark) Mikkel Jensen (United States) Ben Keating**	**Oreca 07**	**344**	**+5 Laps‡**
6	**LMP2**	**52**	**(United States) PR1/Mathiasen Motorsports**	**(United States) Scott Huffaker (Denmark) Mikkel Jensen (United States) Ben Keating**	**Gibson GK428 4.2 L V8**	**344**	**+5 Laps‡**
7	LMP2	18	(United States) Era Motorsport	(United Kingdom) Ryan Dalziel (United States) Dwight Merriman (United Kingdom) Kyle Tilley	Oreca 07	344	+5 Laps
7	LMP2	18	(United States) Era Motorsport	(United Kingdom) Ryan Dalziel (United States) Dwight Merriman (United Kingdom) Kyle Tilley	Gibson GK428 4.2 L V8	344	+5 Laps
8	**GTLM**	**79**	**(United States) WeatherTech Racing**	**(Australia) Matt Campbell (France) Mathieu Jaminet (United States) Cooper MacNeil**	**Porsche 911 RSR-19**	**334**	**+15 Laps‡**
8	**GTLM**	**79**	**(United States) WeatherTech Racing**	**(Australia) Matt Campbell (France) Mathieu Jaminet (United States) Cooper MacNeil**	**Porsche 4.2 L Flat-6**	**334**	**+15 Laps‡**
9	GTLM	25	(United States) BMW Team RLL	(United States) Connor De Phillippi (Austria) Philipp Eng (Canada) Bruno Spengler	BMW M8 GTE	333	+16 Laps
9	GTLM	25	(United States) BMW Team RLL	(United States) Connor De Phillippi (Austria) Philipp Eng (Canada) Bruno Spengler	BMW S63 4.0 L Turbo V8	333	+16 Laps
10	GTLM	24	(United States) BMW Team RLL	(United States) John Edwards (Brazil) Augusto Farfus (Finland) Jesse Krohn	BMW M8 GTE	333	+16 Laps
10	GTLM	24	(United States) BMW Team RLL	(United States) John Edwards (Brazil) Augusto Farfus (Finland) Jesse Krohn	BMW S63 4.0 L Turbo V8	333	+16 Laps
11	GTLM	3	(United States) Corvette Racing	(Netherlands) Nicky Catsburg (Spain) Antonio García (United States) Jordan Taylor	Chevrolet Corvette C8.R	333	+16 Laps
11	GTLM	3	(United States) Corvette Racing	(Netherlands) Nicky Catsburg (Spain) Antonio García (United States) Jordan Taylor	Chevrolet 5.5 L V8	333	+16 Laps
12	GTLM	4	(United States) Corvette Racing	(United States) Tommy Milner (United Kingdom) Alexander Sims (United Kingdom) Nick Tandy	Chevrolet Corvette C8.R	330	+19 Laps
12	GTLM	4	(United States) Corvette Racing	(United States) Tommy Milner (United Kingdom) Alexander Sims (United Kingdom) Nick Tandy	Chevrolet 5.5 L V8	330	+19 Laps
13	**LMP3**	**54**	**(United States) CORE Autosport**	**(United States) Jon Bennett (United States) Colin Braun (United States) George Kurtz**	**Ligier JS P320**	**329**	**+20 Laps‡**
13	**LMP3**	**54**	**(United States) CORE Autosport**	**(United States) Jon Bennett (United States) Colin Braun (United States) George Kurtz**	**Nissan VK56DE 5.6 L V8**	**329**	**+20 Laps‡**
14	LMP3	91	(United States) Riley Motorsports	(Netherlands) Jeroen Bleekemolen (United States) Jim Cox (United States) Dylan Murry	Ligier JS P320	329	+20 Laps
14	LMP3	91	(United States) Riley Motorsports	(Netherlands) Jeroen Bleekemolen (United States) Jim Cox (United States) Dylan Murry	Nissan VK56DE 5.6 L V8	329	+20 Laps
15	LMP3	74	(United States) Riley Motorsports	(Australia) Scott Andrews (United States) Spencer Pigot (United States) Gar Robinson	Ligier JS P320	329	+20 Laps
15	LMP3	74	(United States) Riley Motorsports	(Australia) Scott Andrews (United States) Spencer Pigot (United States) Gar Robinson	Nissan VK56DE 5.6 L V8	329	+20 Laps
16	LMP3	7	(United States) Forty7 Motorsports	(United States) Oliver Askew (United Kingdom) Stevan McAleer (United States) Austin McCusker	Duqueine M-30 - D08	328	+21 Laps
16	LMP3	7	(United States) Forty7 Motorsports	(United States) Oliver Askew (United Kingdom) Stevan McAleer (United States) Austin McCusker	Nissan VK56DE 5.6 L V8	328	+21 Laps
17	LMP3	33	(United States) Sean Creech Motorsport	(Portugal) João Barbosa (France) Yann Clairay (United States) Lance Willsey	Ligier JS P320	328	+21 Laps
17	LMP3	33	(United States) Sean Creech Motorsport	(Portugal) João Barbosa (France) Yann Clairay (United States) Lance Willsey	Nissan VK56DE 5.6 L V8	328	+21 Laps
18	**GTD**	**9**	**(Canada) Pfaff Motorsports**	**(Germany) Lars Kern (Canada) Zacharie Robichon (Belgium) Laurens Vanthoor**	**Porsche 911 GT3 R**	**320**	**+29 Laps‡**
18	**GTD**	**9**	**(Canada) Pfaff Motorsports**	**(Germany) Lars Kern (Canada) Zacharie Robichon (Belgium) Laurens Vanthoor**	**Porsche 4.0 L Flat-6**	**320**	**+29 Laps‡**
19	GTD	16	(United States) Wright Motorsports	(Belgium) Jan Heylen (United States) Trent Hindman (United States) Patrick Long	Porsche 911 GT3 R	320	+29 Laps
19	GTD	16	(United States) Wright Motorsports	(Belgium) Jan Heylen (United States) Trent Hindman (United States) Patrick Long	Porsche 4.0 L Flat-6	320	+29 Laps
20	GTD	23	(United States) Heart of Racing Team	(Canada) Roman De Angelis (United Kingdom) Ross Gunn (United Kingdom) Ian James	Aston Martin Vantage AMR GT3	320	+29 Laps
20	GTD	23	(United States) Heart of Racing Team	(Canada) Roman De Angelis (United Kingdom) Ross Gunn (United Kingdom) Ian James	Aston Martin 4.0 L Turbo V8	320	+29 Laps
21	GTD	44	(United States) Magnus Racing with Archangel Motorsports	(United States) Andy Lally (United States) John Potter (United States) Spencer Pumpelly	Acura NSX GT3 Evo	320	+29 Laps
21	GTD	44	(United States) Magnus Racing with Archangel Motorsports	(United States) Andy Lally (United States) John Potter (United States) Spencer Pumpelly	Acura 3.5 L Turbo V6	320	+29 Laps
22	GTD	88	(United States) Team Hardpoint EBM	(Brazil) Bia Figueiredo (United Kingdom) Katherine Legge (Denmark) Christina Nielsen	Porsche 911 GT3 R	320	+29 Laps
22	GTD	88	(United States) Team Hardpoint EBM	(Brazil) Bia Figueiredo (United Kingdom) Katherine Legge (Denmark) Christina Nielsen	Porsche 4.0 L Flat-6	320	+29 Laps
23	GTD	12	(United States) Vasser Sullivan Racing	(United States) Robert Megennis (United States) Frankie Montecalvo (United States) Zach Veach	Lexus RC F GT3	319	+30 Laps
23	GTD	12	(United States) Vasser Sullivan Racing	(United States) Robert Megennis (United States) Frankie Montecalvo (United States) Zach Veach	Lexus 5.0 L V8	319	+30 Laps
24	GTD	14	(United States) Vasser Sullivan Racing	(United Kingdom) Jack Hawksworth (United States) Kyle Kirkwood (United States) Aaron Telitz	Lexus RC F GT3	313	+36 Laps
24	GTD	14	(United States) Vasser Sullivan Racing	(United Kingdom) Jack Hawksworth (United States) Kyle Kirkwood (United States) Aaron Telitz	Lexus 5.0 L V8	313	+36 Laps
25	GTD	96	(United States) Turner Motorsport	(United States) Bill Auberlen (United States) Robby Foley (Australia) Aidan Read	BMW M6 GT3	313	+36 Laps
25	GTD	96	(United States) Turner Motorsport	(United States) Bill Auberlen (United States) Robby Foley (Australia) Aidan Read	BMW 4.4 L Turbo V8	313	+36 Laps
26 DNF	GTD	75	(Australia) SunEnergy1 Racing	(Germany) Maro Engel (Canada) Mikaël Grenier (Australia) Kenny Habul	Mercedes-AMG GT3 Evo	304	Accident
26 DNF	GTD	75	(Australia) SunEnergy1 Racing	(Germany) Maro Engel (Canada) Mikaël Grenier (Australia) Kenny Habul	Mercedes-AMG M159 6.2 L V8	304	Accident
27 DNF	DPi	31	(United States) Whelen Engineering Racing	(United Kingdom) Mike Conway (Brazil) Pipo Derani (Brazil) Felipe Nasr	Cadillac DPi-V.R	292	Gearbox
27 DNF	DPi	31	(United States) Whelen Engineering Racing	(United Kingdom) Mike Conway (Brazil) Pipo Derani (Brazil) Felipe Nasr	Cadillac 5.5 L V8	292	Gearbox
28 (Note: The no. 48 Ally Cadillac Racing entry was moved to the rear of the DPi classification for violating drive time rules after Simon Pagenaud was found to have driven more than the maximum 4 hours within a 6 hour time period.)	DPi	48	(United States) Ally Cadillac Racing	(United States) Jimmie Johnson (Japan) Kamui Kobayashi (France) Simon Pagenaud	Cadillac DPi-V.R	349	+1.641
28	DPi	48	(United States) Ally Cadillac Racing	(United States) Jimmie Johnson (Japan) Kamui Kobayashi (France) Simon Pagenaud	Cadillac 5.5 L V8	349	+1.641
29	GTD	99	(United States) Team Hardpoint EBM	(New Zealand) Earl Bamber (United States) Trenton Estep (United States) Rob Ferriol	Porsche 911 GT3 R	280	+69 Laps
29	GTD	99	(United States) Team Hardpoint EBM	(New Zealand) Earl Bamber (United States) Trenton Estep (United States) Rob Ferriol	Porsche 4.0 L Flat-6	280	+69 Laps
30 DNF	LMP2	8	(United Kingdom) Tower Motorsports by Starworks	(France) Gabriel Aubry (France) Timothé Buret (Canada) John Farano	Oreca 07	266	Accident
30 DNF	LMP2	8	(United Kingdom) Tower Motorsports by Starworks	(France) Gabriel Aubry (France) Timothé Buret (Canada) John Farano	Gibson GK428 4.2 L V8	266	Accident
31 DNF	LMP3	83	(United States) WIN Autosport	(United Kingdom) Matthew Bell (Germany) Niklas Krütten (Mexico) Rodrigo Sales	Duqueine M-30 - D08	265	Mechanical
31 DNF	LMP3	83	(United States) WIN Autosport	(United Kingdom) Matthew Bell (Germany) Niklas Krütten (Mexico) Rodrigo Sales	Nissan VK56DE 5.6 L V8	265	Mechanical
32 DNF	GTD	1	(United States) Paul Miller Racing	(United States) Corey Lewis (United States) Bryan Sellers (United States) Madison Snow	Lamborghini Huracán GT3 Evo	255	Gearbox
32 DNF	GTD	1	(United States) Paul Miller Racing	(United States) Corey Lewis (United States) Bryan Sellers (United States) Madison Snow	Lamborghini 5.2 L V10	255	Gearbox
33 DNF	LMP3	38	(United States) Performance Tech Motorsports	(United States) Dan Goldburg (Sweden) Rasmus Lindh (Guatemala) Mateo Llarena	Ligier JS P320	177	Overheating
33 DNF	LMP3	38	(United States) Performance Tech Motorsports	(United States) Dan Goldburg (Sweden) Rasmus Lindh (Guatemala) Mateo Llarena	Nissan VK56DE 5.6 L V8	177	Overheating
34 DNF	GTD	28	(United States) Alegra Motorsports	(United States) Billy Johnson (Canada) Daniel Morad (United States) Michael de Quesada	Mercedes-AMG GT3 Evo	91	Accident
34 DNF	GTD	28	(United States) Alegra Motorsports	(United States) Billy Johnson (Canada) Daniel Morad (United States) Michael de Quesada	Mercedes-AMG M159 6.2 L V8	91	Accident
35 DNF	GTD	19	(Austria) GRT Grasser Racing Team	(France) Franck Perera (South Africa) Stephen Simpson (Germany) Tim Zimmermann	Lamborghini Huracán GT3 Evo	91	Accident/brake failure
35 DNF	GTD	19	(Austria) GRT Grasser Racing Team	(France) Franck Perera (South Africa) Stephen Simpson (Germany) Tim Zimmermann	Lamborghini 5.2 L V10	91	Accident/brake failure
36 DNF	LMP2	11	(United States) WIN Autosport	(United States) Thomas Merrill (United States) Tristan Nunez (United States) Steven Thomas	Oreca 07	90	Electronics
36 DNF	LMP2	11	(United States) WIN Autosport	(United States) Thomas Merrill (United States) Tristan Nunez (United States) Steven Thomas	Gibson GK428 4.2 L V8	90	Electronics
37 (Note: The no. 22 United Autosports entry was moved to the rear of the LMP2 classification for exceeding maximum skid block wear regulations.)	LMP2	22	(United Kingdom) United Autosports	(United Kingdom) Wayne Boyd (United States) Jim McGuire (United Kingdom) Guy Smith	Oreca 07	333	+16 Laps
37	LMP2	22	(United Kingdom) United Autosports	(United Kingdom) Wayne Boyd (United States) Jim McGuire (United Kingdom) Guy Smith	Gibson GK428 4.2 L V8	333	+16 Laps
OFFICIAL RESULTS

== Standings after the race ==
DPi Drivers' Championship standings
Pos.	+/–	Driver	Points
1		(Portugal) Filipe Albuquerque (United States) Alexander Rossi (United States) Ricky Taylor	688
2	1	(United States) Jonathan Bomarito (United Kingdom) Oliver Jarvis (United Kingdom) Harry Tincknell	680
3	4	(France) Sébastien Bourdais (France) Loïc Duval (France) Tristan Vautier	645
4		(United States) Dane Cameron (Colombia) Juan Pablo Montoya (France) Olivier Pla	624
5	3	(United States) Jimmie Johnson (Japan) Kamui Kobayashi (France) Simon Pagenaud	609

LMP2 Drivers' Championship standings
Pos.	Driver	Points
1	(United States) Scott Huffaker (Denmark) Mikkel Jensen (United States) Ben Keating	382
2	(United Kingdom) Ryan Dalziel (United States) Dwight Merriman (United Kingdom) Kyle Tilley	350
3	(France) Gabriel Aubry (France) Timothé Buret (Canada) John Farano	326
4	(United States) Thomas Merrill (United States) Tristan Nunez (United States) Steven Thomas	315
5	(United Kingdom) Wayne Boyd (United States) James McGuire (United Kingdom) Guy Smith	388

LMP3 Drivers' Championship standings
Pos.	Driver	Points
1	(United States) Jon Bennett (United States) Colin Braun (United States) George Kurtz	378
2	(Netherlands) Jeroen Bleekemolen (United States) Jim Cox (United States) Dylan Murry	346
3	(Australia) Scott Andrews (United States) Spencer Pigot (United States) Gar Robinson	330
4	(United States) Oliver Askew (United Kingdom) Stevan McAleer (United States) Austin McCusker	312
5	(Portugal) João Barbosa (France) Yann Clairay (United States) Lance Willsey	285

GTLM Drivers' Championship standings
Pos.	+/–	Driver	Points
1		(Netherlands) Nicky Catsburg (Spain) Antonio García (United States) Jordan Taylor	697
2	4	(United States) Cooper MacNeil	656
3		(United States) John Edwards (Brazil) Augusto Farfus (Finland) Jesse Krohn	653
4	2	(United States) Tommy Milner (United Kingdom) Alexander Sims (United Kingdom) Nick Tandy	647
5		(United States) Connor De Phillippi (Austria) Philipp Eng (Canada) Bruno Spengler	636

GTD Drivers' Championship standings
Pos.	+/–	Driver	Points
1	3	(Belgium) Jan Heylen (United States) Trent Hindman (United States) Patrick Long	649
2	1	(Germany) Maro Engel	626
3	2	(Canada) Roman De Angelis (United Kingdom) Ross Gunn (United Kingdom) Ian James	608
4	7	(Germany) Lars Kern (Canada) Zacharie Robichon (Belgium) Laurens Vanthoor	604
5	3	(Canada) Mikaël Grenier (Australia) Kenny Habul	591

- Note: Only the top five positions are included for all sets of standings.

DPi Teams' Championship standings
Pos.	+/–	Team	Points
1		(United States) #10 WTR-Konica Minolta Acura	688
2	1	(Canada) #55 Mazda Motorsports	680
3	4	(United States) #5 JDC-Mustang Sampling Racing	645
4		(United States) #60 Meyer Shank Racing w/ Curb-Agajanian	634
5	3	(United States) #48 Ally Cadillac Racing	609

LMP2 Teams' Championship standings
Pos.	Team	Points
1	(United States) #52 PR1 Mathiasen Motorsports	382
2	(United States) #18 Era Motorsport	350
3	(United States) #8 Tower Motorsport	326
4	(United States) #11 WIN Autosport	315
5	(United States) #22 United Autosports	288

LMP3 Teams' Championship standings
Pos.	Team	Points
1	(United States) #54 CORE Autosport	378
2	(United States) #91 Riley Motorsports	346
3	(United States) #74 Riley Motorsports	330
4	(United States) #7 Forty7 Motorsports	312
5	(United States) #33 Sean Creech Motorsport	285

GTLM Teams' Championship standings
Pos.	+/–	Team	Points
1		(United States) #3 Corvette Racing	697
2	4	(United States) #79 WeatherTech Racing	656
3		(United States) #24 BMW Team RLL	653
4	2	(United States) #4 Corvette Racing	647
5		(United States) #25 BMW Team RLL	636

GTD Teams' Championship standings
Pos.	+/–	Team	Points
1	3	(United States) #16 Wright Motorsports	649
2	4	(United States) #23 Heart of Racing Team	608
3	8	(Canada) #9 Pfaff Motorsports	604
4	2	(Australia) #75 SunEnergy1 Racing	591
5		(United States) #96 Turner Motorsport	540

- Note: Only the top five positions are included for all sets of standings.

DPi Manufacturers' Championship standings
Pos.	+/–	Manufacturer	Points
1	1	(United States) Cadillac	740
2	1	(Japan) Acura	712
3		(Japan) Mazda	682

GTLM Manufacturers' Championship standings
Pos.	+/–	Manufacturer	Points
1		(United States) Chevrolet	720
2		(Germany) BMW	700
3	1	(Germany) Porsche	692
4	1	(Italy) Ferrari	330

GTD Manufacturers' Championship standings
Pos.	+/–	Manufacturer	Points
1	2	(Germany) Porsche	714
2	1	(Germany) Mercedes-AMG	656
3	1	(United Kingdom) Aston Martin	651
4	2	(Italy) Lamborghini	615
5	2	(Japan) Acura	587

- Note: Only the top five positions are included for all sets of standings.

IMSA SportsCar Championship
Previous race: 2021 24 Hours of Daytona	2021 season	Next race: 2021 Sports Car Challenge at Mid-Ohio
