= Colin Caresani =

Dutch racing driver (born 2003)

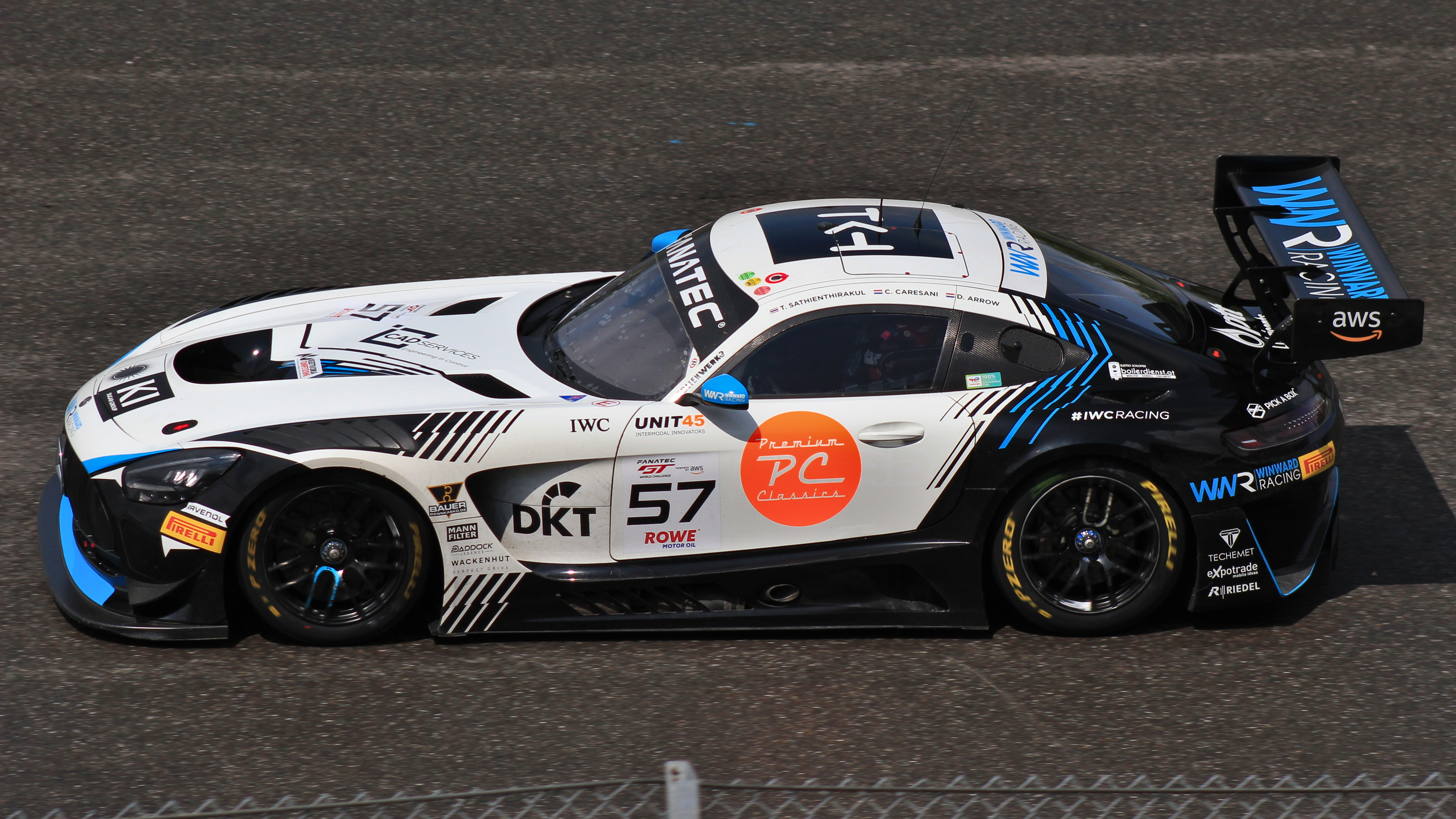
- Caresani in 2024
- Nationality: (Netherlands) Dutch
- Born: 22 December 2003 (age 22) Haarlem, Netherlands
- Categorisation: FIA Silver

Championship titles
- 2024 2021 2020: GT World Challenge Europe Endurance Cup - Silver; VRM BMW M2 Cup; Ford Fiesta Sprint Cup

Colin Caresani (born 22 December 2003 in Haarlem) is a Dutch racing driver. He is the 2024 GT World Challenge Europe Endurance Cup Silver Cup champion.

== Career ==
Caresani started karting at the age of nine, most notably finishing fifth in the 2018 Rotax Euro Trophy in the Junior class.

Stepping up to car racing in 2019, Caresani finished runner-up in the Ford Fiesta Sprint Cup in his first season in cars. Over the next two years, Caresani won the Ford Fiesta Sprint Cup in 2020 and the BMW M2 CS Racing Cup Benelux in 2021.

In 2022, Caresani joined Project 1 to compete in the final season of the DTM Trophy. After finishing third at the Lausitzring, Caresani won both races at Imola to take the points lead from Tim Heinemann. Keeping the points lead through Norisring, Caresani took pole at the Nürburgring but was only able to convert it into a fourth-place finish. Having fallen to second in points after not scoring podiums at the Nürburgring and Spa, Caresani won both the opening races of the last two rounds of the season at Red Bull Ring and Hockenheimring to end runner-up in the standings.

During 2023, Caresani made his ADAC GT Masters debut at the Nürburgring round for Schnitzelalm Racing alongside Marcel Marchewicz. In his only round in the series, Caresani scored a best result of fifth in race two.

The following year, Caresani made his GT World Challenge Europe Endurance Cup debut for Winward Racing alongside "Daan Arrow" and Tanart Sathienthirakul. Caresani finished on the podium in every race he contested, which included class wins at Le Castellet and Monza, en route to the Silver Cup title with a race to spare.

For his Silver Cup title defence, Caresani switched to GetSpeed ahead of 2025. The Dutchman also joined AKM Motorsport alongside Florian Scholze and Tanart Sathienthirakul to compete in the Italian GT Endurance Championship. Racing in the first three rounds in the former and ending the year 35th in the Silver Cup standings, Caresani found more success in the latter, scoring a class win at Imola to end the season sixth in the GT3 Pro-Am points.

In 2026, Caresani joined Haupt Racing Team-run Grupo Prom Racing Team to compete in the GT World Challenge Europe Endurance Cup, as well as joining Stratia Motorsport to race in the Italian GT Championship Endurance Cup.

== Karting record ==
=== Karting career summary ===
Season	Series	Team	Position
2017	Rotax Euro Challenge — Rotax Junior	JJ Racing	19th
2017	BNL Golden Trophy — Junior Max	JJ Racing	29th
2018	Rotax Max Euro Trophy - Junior Max	JJ Racing	5th

== Racing record ==
=== Racing career summary ===
Season	Series	Team	Races	Wins	Poles	F/Laps	Podiums	Points	Position
2019	Ford Fiesta Sprint Cup	Bas Koeten Racing	12	1	4	1	9	185	**2nd**
2020	Ford Fiesta Sprint Cup	Bas Koeten Racing	7	4	1	1	7	133	**1st**
2021	VRM BMW M2 Cup Powered by Hankook	Bas Koeten Racing	12	5	2	0	6	172.5	**1st**
2021	BMW M2 Cup Germany	Team Project 1	??	??	??	??	??	88	6th
2022	DTM Trophy	Project 1	14	4	1	4	7	188	**2nd**
2022	Nürburgring Langstrecken-Serie – BMW M240i	Schnitzelalm Racing	2	0	0	0	0	0	NC
2023	Nürburgring Langstrecken-Serie – BMW M240i	Schnitzelalm Racing	2	0	0	0	1	11	15th
2023	Nürburgring Langstrecken-Serie – SP9	Schnitzelalm Racing	3	0	0	0	0	5	6th
2023	24 Hours of Nürburgring – SP9 Pro-Am	Schnitzelalm Racing	1	0	0	0	0	—N/a	DNF
2023	ADAC GT Masters	Schnitzelalm Racing	2	0	0	0	0	16	26th
2024	24 Hours of Nürburgring – SP9 Pro-Am	Konrad Motorsport	1	0	0	0	1	—N/a	**3rd**
2024	GT World Challenge Europe Endurance Cup	Winward Racing	4	0	0	0	0	2	30th
2024	GT World Challenge Europe Endurance Cup – Silver	Winward Racing	4	2	1	2	4	102	**1st**
2024	Intercontinental GT Challenge	Winward Racing	1	0	0	0	0	0	NC
2025	GT World Challenge Europe Endurance Cup	GetSpeed	3	0	0	0	0	0	NC
2025	GT World Challenge Europe Endurance Cup – Silver	GetSpeed	3	0	0	0	0	6	35th
2025	Italian GT Championship Endurance Cup – GT3 Pro-Am	Antonelli Motorsport	4	1	0	0	1	55	6th
2026	GT World Challenge Europe Endurance Cup	Grupo Prom Racing Team	4	0	0	0	0	0	NC
2026	GT World Challenge Europe Endurance Cup – Bronze	Grupo Prom Racing Team	3	0	0	0	0	0	NC
2026	Nürburgring Langstrecken-Serie – SP9 Pro	HRT Ford Racing	1	0	0	0	0	2	NC
2026	24 Hours of Nürburgring – SP9 Pro-Am	HRT Ford Racing	1	0	1	0	0	—N/a	DNF
2026	Intercontinental GT Challenge	HRT Ford Racing	1	0	0	0	0	0	NC
2026	Intercontinental GT Challenge	Grupo Prom Racing Team	1	0	0	0	0	0	NC
2026	Italian GT Championship Endurance Cup – GT3	Stratia Motorsport	3	0	0	0	0	0	NC
2026	Italian GT Championship Endurance Cup – GT3 Am	Stratia Motorsport	3	0	0	1	0	26	13th

=== Complete ADAC GT Masters results ===
(key) (Races in bold indicate pole position) (Races in italics indicate fastest lap)

Year	Team	Car	1	2	3	4	5	6	7	8	9	10	11	12	DC	Points
2023	Schnitzelalm Racing	Mercedes-AMG GT3 Evo	HOC; 1	HOC; 2	NOR; 1	NOR; 2	NÜR; 1; 11	NÜR; 2; 5	SAC; 1	SAC; 2	RBR; 1	RBR; 2	HOC; 1	HOC; 2	26th	16

=== Complete GT World Challenge Europe results ===
==== GT World Challenge Europe Endurance Cup ====
(Races in bold indicate pole position) (Races in italics indicate fastest lap)

Year	Team	Car	Class	1	2	3	4	5	6	7	Pos.	Points
2024	Winward Racing	Mercedes-AMG GT3 Evo	Silver	LEC; 19	SPA; 6H; 14	SPA; 12H; 19	**SPA**; **24H**; 28	NÜR; 25	MNZ; 9	JED	1st	102
2025	GetSpeed	Mercedes-AMG GT3 Evo	Silver	LEC; 29	MNZ; 47†	SPA; 6H; 68†	SPA; 12H; 68†	SPA; 24H; Ret	NÜR	BAR	35th	6
2026	Grupo Prom Racing Team	Mercedes-AMG GT3 Evo	Bronze	LEC; 47	MNZ; 32				NÜR; 46	ALG	NC	0
2026	Grupo Prom Racing Team	Mercedes-AMG GT3 Evo	Pro-Am			SPA; 6H; 63†	SPA; 12H; 63†	SPA; 24H; Ret			NC	0
