= Rodrigo Almeida =

Mozambican racing driver (born 2004)

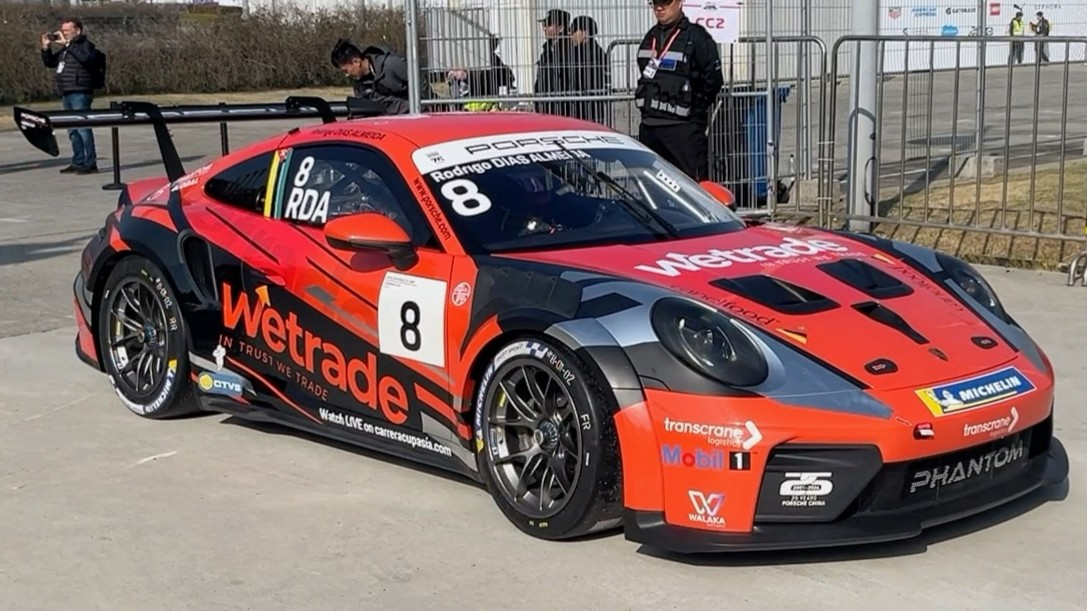
- Almeida driving in the 2026 Porsche Carrera Cup Asia Shanghai round
- Born: Rodrigo Dias Almeida; 30 March 2004 (age 22); Santo Tirso, Portugal
- Nationality: (Mozambique) Mozambican
- Categorisation: FIA Silver

Rodrigo Dias Almeida (born 30 March 2004) is a Portuguese-born Mozambican racing driver who last competed for Team Wetrade x Phantom Global in Porsche Carrera Cup Asia.

== Career ==
Almeida made his single-seater debut at the end of 2019, joining Xcel Motorsport in the Trophy round of the Formula 4 UAE Championship. In his only races in single-seaters, he finished seventh and fifth. Returning to car racing the following year, Almeida raced in the TCR Ibérico Touring Car Series, finishing runner-up in the DSG class to Nicola Baldan. Almeida then competed in the Dubai 24 Hour, finishing fifth in the GT4 class, before switching to BMW M2 Cup Germany for the rest of the year. Taking one podium all season, a second place-finish at Zolder, Almeida ended the year fifth in points in his only season in the series.

Remaining in GT4 competitions for 2022, Almeida joined BWT Mücke Motorsport to compete in 2022 DTM Trophy. In the series' last season, Almeida took his first podium at the Norisring, before taking his only win of the season at the Red Bull Ring en route to a fifth-place points finish.

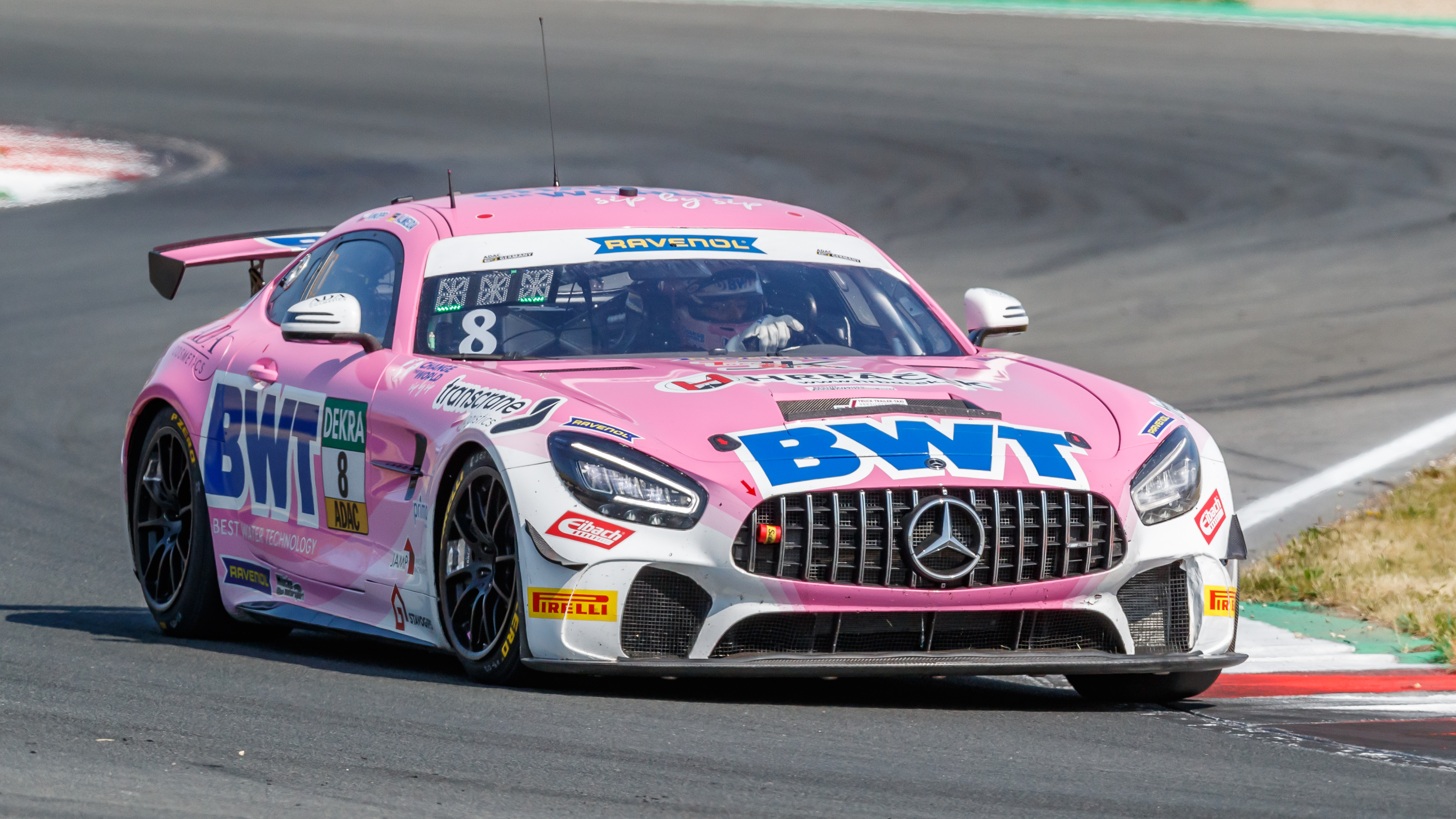
Almeida at Motorsport Arena Oschersleben in 2023

The following year, Almeida remained with BWT Mücke Motorsport to race in ADAC GT4 Germany alongside Josef Knopp. In their only season together, Almeida scored points all but three times and scored a best result of seventh at Lausitzring to end the year 16th in points. At the end of the year, Almeida was a candidate for the PCCA Talent Pool assessment at Sepang.

After a brief appearance in LMP3 machinery in the Prototype Winter Series, Almeida joined R&B Racing to compete in Porsche Carrera Cup Asia. In his first season in the series, Almeida scored his first overall podium in race one at Sepang by finishing third, helping him to secure fifth place in the overall standings. At the end of the year, Almeida was once again part of the Porsche Carrera Cup Asia Talent Pool roster.

Almeida returned to the series for 2025, albeit switching to Team Jebsen for his sophomore season. Taking his first podium of the season at Shanghai by finishing second in race two, before repeating the same feat three rounds later at Bangsaen to end the year fifth in points. During 2025, Almeida also made his GT3 debut for Comtoyou Racing, making one-off appearances in the GT World Challenge Europe Endurance and Sprint Cups.

In 2026, Almeida returned to Porsche Carrera Cup Asia, switching to Team Wetrade x Phantom Global for his third season in the series. In the six-round season, Almeida took maximum points at Zhuhai and Sepang, as well as two other podiums, to secure third in overall points.

== Karting record ==
=== Karting career summary ===
Season	Series	Team	Position
2017	Troféu Rotax Portugal – Junior Max		5th
2018	Karting Academy Trophy	Almeida Silva Marco Joel	32nd
2018	IAME International Final – X30 Junior	CRG Racing Team	NC
2019	South Garda Winter Cup – KZ2	DR	NC
2019	WSK Super Master Series – KZ2	DR	61st
2019	Deutsche Kart-Meisterschaft – KZ2	DR	NC
2019	WSK Euro Series – KZ2	DR	77th
2019	Karting European Championship – KZ2	DR	54th
2019	Karting International Super Cup – KZ2	DR	NC
2020	WSK Euro Series – KZ2	DR	72nd
2020	Champions of the Future – KZ2	DR	7th
2020	Karting European Championship – KZ2	DR	41st
2020	Portuguese Karting Championship – X30 Super Shifter		NC

== Racing record ==
=== Racing career summary ===
Season	Series	Team	Races	Wins	Poles	F/laps	Podiums	Points	Position
2019	Formula 4 UAE Championship – Trophy Round	Xcel Motorsport	2	0	0	0	0	N/A	NC
2020	TCR Ibérico Touring Car Series	Élite Motorsport	2	0	0	0	0	16	14th
2021	24H GT Series – GT4	3Y Technology	1	0	0	0	0	0	NC
2021	BMW M2 Cup Germany	Project 1	?	?	?	?	?	120	5th
2022	DTM Trophy	BWT Mücke Motorsport	14	1	0	0	2	111	5th
2023	GT Winter Series	BWT Mücke Motorsport	?	?	?	?	?	18.58	56th
2023	ADAC GT4 Germany	BWT Mücke Motorsport	12	0	0	0	0	47	16th
2023	GT4 European Series – Silver	BWT Mücke Motorsport	2	0	0	0	0	2	37th
2024	Prototype Winter Series – Class 3	Mühlner Motorsport	2	0	0	0	1	11.43	10th
2024	Porsche Carrera Cup Asia	R&B Racing	16	0	0	0	1	188	5th
2024	Porsche Carrera Cup France	Martinet by Alméras	2	0	0	0	0	0	NC†
2025	Porsche Carrera Cup Asia	Team Jebsen	12	0	0	0	2	155	5th
2025	GT World Challenge Europe Endurance Cup	Comtoyou Racing	1	0	0	0	0	0	NC
2025	GT World Challenge Europe Endurance Cup – Bronze	Comtoyou Racing	1	0	0	0	0	0	NC
2025	GT World Challenge Europe Sprint Cup	Comtoyou Racing	2	0	0	0	0	0	NC
2025	GT World Challenge Europe Sprint Cup – Silver	Comtoyou Racing	2	0	0	0	0	1	17th
2026	Porsche Carrera Cup Asia	Team Wetrade x Phantom Global	12	0	0	0	4	163.5	**3rd**

*Season in progress.

=== Complete ADAC GT4 Germany results ===
(key) (Races in bold indicate pole position) (Races in italics indicate fastest lap)

Year	Team	Car	1	2	3	4	5	6	7	8	9	10	11	12	Pos	Points
2023	BWT Mücke Motorsport	Mercedes-AMG GT4	OSC; 1; 13	OSC; 2; 18	ZAN; 1; 8	ZAN; 2; 12	NÜR; 1 Ret	NÜR; 2; 14	LAU; 1; 7	LAU; 2; 12	SAC; 1; 8	SAC; 2; 10	HOC; 1; 15	HOC; 2; 26	16th	47

=== Complete GT4 European Series results ===
(key) (Races in bold indicate pole position) (Races in italics indicate fastest lap)

Year	Team	Car	Class	1	2	3	4	5	6	7	8	9	10	11	12	Pos	Points
2023	BWT Mücke Motorsport	Mercedes-AMG GT4	Silver	MNZ; 1	MNZ; 2	LEC; 1	LEC; 2	SPA; 1; 12	SPA; 2; 20	MIS; 1	MIS; 2	HOC; 1	HOC; 2	CAT; 1	CAT; 2	37th	2

=== Complete Porsche Carrera Cup Asia results ===
(key) (Races in bold indicate pole position; races in italics indicate points for the fastest lap of top ten finishers)

Year	Entrant	Class	1	2	3	4	5	6	7	8	9	10	11	12	13	14	15	16	DC	Points
2024	R&B Racing	Pro	SHA; 1; 7	SHA; 2; 4	SUZ; 1; 5	SUZ; 2; 5	CHA; 1; 6	CHA; 2; 5	BAN; 1; 4	BAN; 2; 4	SEP; 1; 3	SEP; 2 Ret	SEP; 3; 14	MRN; 1; 6	MRN; 2; 5	SHA; 1; 6	SHA; 2; 7	SHA; 3; 8	5th	188
2025	Team Jebsen	Pro	SHA; 1; 6	SHA; 2; 2	MOT; 1; 5	MOT; 2; 6	SEP; 1; 6	SEP; 2; 13	SEP; 3 DNS	BAN; 1; 2	BAN; 2 DNS	MAN; 1; 9	MAN; 2; 5	MAN; 3; 7	MRN; 1; 10	MRN; 2; 6			5th	155
2026	Team Wetrade x Phantom Global	Pro	SHA; 1; 3	SHA; 2; 8	ZHU; 1; 3	ZHU; 2; 2	FUJ; 1; 4	FUJ; 2; 4	BAN; 1 DNS	BAN; 2; 14	SEP; 1; 4	SEP; 2; 2	SEP; 3; 9	MRN; 1; 4	MRN; 2 Ret				3rd	163.5

^{*} Season still in progress.

=== Complete GT World Challenge Europe results ===
==== GT World Challenge Europe Endurance Cup ====
Year	Team	Car	Class	1	2	3	4	5	6	7	Pos.	Points
2025	Comtoyou Racing	Aston Martin Vantage AMR GT3 Evo	Bronze	LEC	MNZ	SPA; 6H; 71†	SPA; 12H; 71†	SPA; 24H; Ret	NÜR	CAT	NC	0

==== GT World Challenge Europe Sprint Cup results ====
Year	Team	Car	Class	1	2	3	4	5	6	7	8	9	10	Pos.	Points
2025	Comtoyou Racing	Aston Martin Vantage AMR GT3 Evo	Silver	BRH; 1	BRH; 2	ZAN; 1	ZAN; 2	MIS; 1	MIS; 2	MAG; 1	MAG; 2	VAL; 1 Ret	VAL; 2; 35	17th	1
