= 2024 24 Hours of Nürburgring =

Endurance motor race in Germany

(Germany) 2024 24 Hours of Nürburgring
Event Information
- Round 2 of 4 in the 2024
- Date: 30 May – 2 June 2024
- Location: Nürburg, Rhineland-Palatinate, Germany
- Venue: Nürburgring

Results
Race 1
Distance	50 laps	1268.9 km
Pole position	(Germany) Max Hesse; BMW Junior Team	8:10.992
Winner	(Switzerland) Ricardo Feller (Germany) Dennis Marschall (Germany) Christopher Mies (Germany) Frank Stippler; Scherer Sport Team Phoenix	23:05:27.68

The 2024 Nürburgring 24 Hours (officially known as ADAC Ravenol 24h Race at the Nürburgring Nordschleife for sponsorship reasons) was the 52nd running of the Nürburgring 24 Hours, which took place over 1–2 June 2024. Though still organised by the ADAC Nordrhein, the edition marked the start of a new partnership with the SRO Motorsports Group that saw the event stage the second round of the 2024 Intercontinental GT Challenge. This was the first race with lubricant manufacturer Ravenol as title sponsor, replacing TotalEnergies.

The race was, at the time of completion, the shortest in the history of the event, with only 7 hours and 24 minutes of running before being red flagged due to excessive fog. The race was won by the No. 16 Scherer Sport PHX, tying Manthey Racing for the record in overall victories at seven wins.

== Entry list ==
No.	Entrant	Car	Class	Driver 1	Driver 2	Driver 3	Driver 4
SP 9 FIA GT3 (25 entries)
1	(Germany) Frikadelli Racing Team	Ferrari 296 GT3	P	(Germany) Felipe Fernández Laser	(Germany) Daniel Keilwitz	(Germany) Luca Ludwig	(Argentina) Nicolás Varrone
3	(Germany) Mercedes-AMG Team Bilstein by HRT	Mercedes-AMG GT3 Evo	P	(Italy) Michele Beretta	(United Kingdom) Frank Bird	(India) Arjun Maini	(Germany) Jusuf Owega
4	(Germany) Mercedes-AMG Team Bilstein by HRT	Mercedes-AMG GT3 Evo	P	(Germany) Maximilian Götz	(Spain) Daniel Juncadella	(India) Arjun Maini	(Germany) Luca Stolz
5	(Germany) Herberth Motorsport	Porsche 911 GT3 R (992)	P	(Australia) Matt Campbell	(Germany) Vincent Kolb	(Norway) Dennis Olsen	(Germany) Robert Renauer
6	(Germany) Team Advan x HRT	Mercedes-AMG GT3 Evo	PA	(Estonia) Ralf Aron	(Germany) Dennis Fetzer	(Germany) Hubert Haupt	(Germany) Salman Owega
7	(Austria) Konrad Motorsport	Lamborghini Huracán GT3 Evo	PA	(Netherlands) Colin Caresani	(Germany) Torsten Kratz	(Germany) Maximilian Paul	(United States) Danny Soufi
8	(Germany) Mercedes-AMG Team GetSpeed	Mercedes-AMG GT3 Evo	P	(Austria) Lucas Auer	(United Kingdom) Adam Christodoulou	(Switzerland) Philip Ellis	(Canada) Mikaël Grenier
11	(Germany) Schnitzelalm Racing	Mercedes-AMG GT3 Evo	PA	(Germany) Jay Mo Härtling	(Germany) Kenneth Heyer	(Germany) Marcel Marchewicz	
15	(Germany) Scherer Sport PHX	Audi R8 LMS Evo II	P	(Switzerland) Ricardo Feller	(Germany) Christopher Haase	(Belgium) Frédéric Vervisch	(Germany) Markus Winkelhock
16	(Germany) Scherer Sport PHX	Audi R8 LMS Evo II	P	(Switzerland) Ricardo Feller	(Germany) Dennis Marschall	(Germany) Christopher Mies	(Germany) Frank Stippler
17	(Germany) PROsport Racing	Aston Martin Vantage AMR GT3	P	(Germany) Nico Bastian	(Germany) Marek Böckmann	(United Kingdom) Ben Green	(Germany) Hugo Sasse
24	(Germany) Lionspeed GP	Porsche 911 GT3 R (992)	PA	(Hong Kong) Antares Au	(Netherlands) Indy Dontje	(Germany) Patrick Kolb	(Switzerland) Patric Niederhauser
27	(Germany) Red Bull Team ABT	Lamborghini Huracán GT3 Evo 2	P	(South Africa) Jordan Pepper	(South Africa) Kelvin van der Linde	(Italy) Marco Mapelli	
33	(Germany) Falken Motorsports	Porsche 911 GT3 R (992)	P	(France) Julien Andlauer	(Austria) Klaus Bachler	(Germany) Sven Müller	(Belgium) Alessio Picariello
34	(Germany) Walkenhorst Motorsport	Aston Martin Vantage AMR GT3 Evo	P	(Poland) Kuba Giermaziak	(Norway) Christian Krognes	(United Kingdom) David Pittard	(Denmark) Nicki Thiim
35	(Germany) Walkenhorst Motorsport	Aston Martin Vantage AMR GT3 Evo	PA	(Germany) Patrick Assenheimer	(United States) Chandler Hull	(Germany) Benjamin Mazatis	(Germany) Mike David Ortmann
36	(Germany) Walkenhorst Motorsport	Aston Martin Vantage AMR GT3 Evo	PA	(Germany) Stefan Aust	(Germany) Christian Bollrath	(Norway) Anders Buchardt	(Germany) Henry Walkenhorst
44	(Germany) Falken Motorsports	Porsche 911 GT3 R (992)	P	(Sweden) Joel Eriksson	(Germany) Tim Heinemann	(Germany) Nico Menzel	(Austria) Martin Ragginger
54	(Italy) Dinamic GT	Porsche 911 GT3 R (992)	P	(Denmark) Bastian Buus	(Germany) Marvin Dienst	(Germany) Marco Holzer	(Germany) Marco Seefried
71	(Lithuania) Juta Racing	Audi R8 LMS Evo II	PA	(Germany) Elia Erhart	(Germany) Pierre Kaffer	(Germany) Alexey Veremenko (Note: Veremenko and "Selv" are Russian, but they compete under a German licence as Russian national emblems were banned by the FIA following the Russian invasion of Ukraine. Mavlanov, also a Russian, competes under an Armenian licence for the same reason.)	(Germany) "Selv"
72	(Germany) BMW M Team RMG	BMW M4 GT3	P	(United Kingdom) Dan Harper	(Germany) Max Hesse	(Belgium) Charles Weerts	
98	(Germany) Rowe Racing	BMW M4 GT3	P	(Brazil) Augusto Farfus	(Switzerland) Raffaele Marciello	(Belgium) Maxime Martin	(Germany) Marco Wittmann
99	(Germany) Rowe Racing	BMW M4 GT3	P	(Brazil) Augusto Farfus	(Netherlands) Robin Frijns	(South Africa) Sheldon van der Linde	(Belgium) Dries Vanthoor
130	(Germany) Mercedes-AMG Team GetSpeed	Mercedes-AMG GT3 Evo	P	(United Kingdom) Adam Christodoulou	(Germany) Maro Engel	(Andorra) Jules Gounon	(Germany) Fabian Schiller
911	(Germany) Manthey EMA	Porsche 911 GT3 R (992)	P	(France) Kévin Estre	(Turkey) Ayhancan Güven	(Austria) Thomas Preining	(Belgium) Laurens Vanthoor
SP 10 – SRO GT4 (15 entries)
77	(Germany) Black Falcon	BMW M4 GT4 Gen II		(United States) Charles Espenlaub	(United States) Ryan Harrison	(United States) Mike Skeen	(Romania) Alexandru Vasilescu
111	(Germany) Schnitzelalm Racing	Mercedes AMG GT4		(Germany) Tim Neuser	(Germany) David Schumacher	(United States) David Thilenius	(Germany) Moritz Wiskirchen
164	(Germany) W&S Motorsport	Porsche 718 Cayman GT4 RS Clubsport		(Germany) Stephan Brodmerkel	(Germany) Hendrik Still	(Germany) Jürgen Vöhringer	(Germany) Finn Zulauf
165	(Germany) Schmickler Performance powered by Ravenol	Porsche 718 Cayman GT4 RS Clubsport		(Switzerland) Ivan Jacoma	(Germany) Claudius Karch	(Germany) Kai Riemer	(Germany) Achim Wawer
169	(Germany) Dörr Motorsport	Aston Martin Vantage AMR GT4		(Germany) Phil Dörr	(Germany) Michael Funke	(Norway) Oskar Sandberg	(Germany) Aaron Wenisch
170	(Germany) Toyo Tires with Ring Racing	Toyota GR Supra GT4 Evo		(Germany) Andreas Gülden	(Germany) Marc Hennerici	(Germany) Tim Sandtler	
171	(Germany) Toyo Tires with Ring Racing	Toyota GR Supra GT4 Evo		(Japan) Takayuki Kinoshita	(Germany) Michael Tischner	(Germany) Heiko Tönges	
175	(Germany) PROsport Racing	Aston Martin Vantage AMR GT4		(Germany) Christoph Breuer	(Chile) Benjamín Hites	(Switzerland) Jasmin Preisig	(Germany) Reinhold Renger
177	(Germany) PROsport Racing	Aston Martin Vantage AMR GT4		(Germany) Rudi Adams	(Sweden) Gustav Bard	(Belgium) Alexander Hommerson	(Sweden) Patrick Skoog
180	(Germany) SRS Team Sorg Rennsport	Porsche 718 Cayman GT4 RS Clubsport		(Germany) Henning Eschweiler	(Germany) Heinz Jürgen Kroner	(Germany) Lennard Paul Naumann	(Germany) "Maximilian"
181	(Germany) SRS Team Sorg Rennsport	Porsche 718 Cayman GT4 RS Clubsport		(Germany) Richard Jodexnis	(Germany) Christoph Krombach	(Germany) Kurt Strube	(Austria) Bernhard Wagner
187	(Germany) FK Performance Motorsport	BMW M4 GT4 Gen II		(South Africa) Leyton Fourie	(Germany) Yannick Fübrich	(Germany) Christian Konnerth	(United Kingdom) Joseph Warhurst
188	(Germany) FK Performance Motorsport	BMW M4 GT4 Gen II		(Germany) Nick Hancke	(Netherlands) Maxime Oosten	(Germany) Lorenz Stegmann	(Germany) Nick Wüstenhagen
191	(Germany) Walkenhorst Racing	BMW M4 GT4 Gen II		(Belgium) Aris Balanian	(Germany) Jörg Breuer	(Germany) Nico Hantke	(Germany) Tobias Wahl
192	(Germany) Walkenhorst Racing	BMW M4 GT4 Gen II		(Germany) Jörg Breuer	(France) Jean-Christophe David	(Germany) Florian Wahl	(Germany) Andreas Ziegler
SP 11 – SRO GT2 (1 entry)
55	(Germany) Dörr Motorsport	KTM X-Bow GT2	PA	(Germany) Ben Dörr	(Germany) Christian Gebhardt	(Austria) Max Hofer	(Germany) Fabian Vettel
Cup2 Porsche 992 Cup (14 entries)
103	(Germany) Black Falcon	Porsche 992 GT3 Cup	P	(Turkey) Mustafa Mehmet Kaya	(Italy) Gabriele Piana	(Germany) Tim Scheerbarth	(Germany) Mike Stursberg
106	(Germany) RPM Racing	Porsche 992 GT3 Cup	Am	(Germany) Peter Bonk	(South Korea) Jang Han Choi	(Czech Republic) Milan Kodídek	(Netherlands) Marco van Ramshorst
107	(Germany) RPM Racing	Porsche 992 GT3 Cup	Am	(Germany) Philip Hamprecht	(Netherlands) Patrick Huisman	(Sweden) Niclas Jönsson	(United States) Tracy Krohn
112	(Germany) KKrämer Racing	Porsche 992 GT3 Cup	Am	(Germany) Karsten Krämer	(Germany) Fidel Leib	(Germany) Jacob Riegel	(Germany) Jan-Erik Slooten
116	(Germany) Scherer Sport PHX	Porsche 992 GT3 Cup	P	(Germany) Christer Jöns	(Germany) Thomas Kiefer	(Luxembourg) Dylan Pereira	(Netherlands) Larry ten Voorde
119	(Germany) Clickversicherungs Team	Porsche 992 GT3 Cup	P	(Germany) Robin Chrzanowski	(Germany) Kersten Jodexnis	(New Zealand) Peter Scharmach	(Germany) Nick Salewsky
121	(Germany) KKrämer Racing	Porsche 992 GT3 Cup	P	(Germany) Christopher Brück	(Germany) Michele Di Martino	(Germany) Fidel Leib	(Germany) Moritz Oberheim
122	(Belgium) Mühlner Motorsport	Porsche 992 GT3 Cup	P	(United Kingdom) Alex Brundle	(Germany) Ben Bünnagel	(Germany) Moritz Kranz	(Germany) Michael Rebhan
123	(Belgium) Mühlner Motorsport	Porsche 992 GT3 Cup	P	(Switzerland) Michelangelo Comazzi	(Germany) Peter Terting	(Germany) Tobias Vazquez-Garcia	(Germany) Janis Waldow
124	(Belgium) Mühlner Motorsport	Porsche 992 GT3 Cup	P	(United Kingdom) Alex Brundle	(Germany) Moritz Kranz	(Germany) Peter Terting	(Germany) Tobias Vazquez-Garcia
125	(Germany) Huber Motorsport	Porsche 992 GT3 Cup	P	(Germany) David Beckmann	(Germany) Thomas Kiefer	(Germany) Mark Wallenwein	(Germany) Hans Wehrmann
127	(Germany) Max Kruse Racing	Porsche 992 GT3 Cup	P	(Netherlands) Tom Coronel	(Netherlands) Paul Meijer	(Portugal) Tiago Monteiro	(Netherlands) Jan Jaap van Roon
131	(Germany) Teichmann Racing	Porsche 992 GT3 Cup	P	(Germany) David Kiefer	(Germany) Marius Kiefer	(Germany) Stefan Kiefer	(Austria) Luca Rettenbacher
148	(Germany) Black Falcon Team 48 LOSCH	Porsche 992 GT3 Cup	P	(Luxembourg) Steve Jans	(Germany) Tobias Müller	(Germany) Noah Nagelsdiek	(Netherlands) Morris Schuring
Cup3 Cayman GT4 Trophy (6 entries)
945	(Germany) Team mcchip-dkr	Porsche 718 Cayman GT4 RS Clubsport	P	(Japan) Kohei Fukuda	(Germany) Carl-Friedrich Kolb	(Germany) Markus Nölken	(Japan) Kouichi Okumura
949	(Germany) SRS Team Sorg Rennsport	Porsche 718 Cayman GT4 RS Clubsport	Am	(Italy) Edoardo Bugane	(Switzerland) Philipp Hagnauer	(United Kingdom) Harley Haughton	(Germany) Björn Simon
959	(Germany) SRS Team Sorg Rennsport	Porsche 718 Cayman GT4 RS Clubsport	Am	(Germany) Heiko Eichenberg	(Germany) Fabio Grosse	(Switzerland) Patrik Grütter	
961	(Germany) W&S Motorsport	Porsche 718 Cayman GT4 RS Clubsport	Am	(Germany) Axel Duffner	(United States) Andreas Gabler	(Germany) René Höber	(Germany) Alexander Müller
962	(Germany) AVIA W&S Motorsport	Porsche 718 Cayman GT4 RS Clubsport	P	(France) Joshua Bednarski	(Finland) Philip Miemois	(United States) Alec Udell	(Germany) Niclas Wiedmann
969	(Germany) SRS Team Sorg Rennsport	Porsche 718 Cayman GT4 RS Clubsport	P	(Germany) Alex Fielenbach	(Sweden) Tommy Graberg	(Ukraine) Oleksiy Kikireshko	(Germany) Rüdiger Schicht
TCR (5 entries)
775	(Germany) sharky-racing	Audi RS 3 LMS TCR (2017)		(Germany) Leon Dreiser	(Germany) Raphael Hundeborn	(Germany) Stefan Lohn	(Germany) Dirk Vleugels
800	(Germany) asBest Racing	Volkswagen Golf GTI TCR		(Germany) Meik Utsch	(Japan) Junichi Umemoto	(Germany) Jens Wulf	(Jordan) Nadir Zuhour
830	(South Korea) Hyundai Motorsport N	Hyundai Elantra N TCR (2024)		(Spain) Mikel Azcona	(Germany) Marc Basseng	(Germany) Manuel Lauck	
831	(South Korea) Hyundai Motorsport N	Hyundai Elantra N TCR (2024)		(United States) Mason Filippi	(United States) Harry Gottsacker	(United States) Bryson Morris	(Canada) Mark Wilkins
832	(South Korea) Hyundai Motorsport N	Hyundai Elantra N TCR (2024)		(China) Martin Cao	(China) Xiaole He	(Hong Kong) Andy Yan	(China) Zhendong Zhang
Other Classes
SPX (2 entries)
60	(South Korea) Hankook Competition	Porsche 992 GT3 Cup	PA	(Netherlands) Roelof Bruins	(Canada) Steven Cho	(South Korea) Jongkyum Kim	
706	(United States) Glickenhaus Racing LLC	Glickenhaus SCG 004c	P	(Germany) Lance David Arnold	(France) Côme Ledogar	(France) Franck Mailleux	(Germany) Thomas Mutsch
SP 8T (7 entries)
145	(Germany) Cerny Motorsport	BMW M4 GT4 Gen II		(Netherlands) Jeroen Bleekemolen	(United Kingdom) Peter Cate	(Germany) Timo Glock	(Germany) Timo Scheider
146	(Singapore) Giti Tire Motorsport by WS Racing	BMW M4 GT4 Gen II		(United Kingdom) Pippa Mann	(Germany) Carrie Schreiner	(Netherlands) Beitske Visser	(Liechtenstein) Fabienne Wohlwend
147	(Singapore) Giti Tire Motorsport by WS Racing	BMW M4 GT4 Gen II		(Germany) Lukas Drost	(Germany) Ulrich Schmidt	(Switzerland) Andreas Simon	(Monaco) Micah Stanley
150	(Germany) Team Bilstein by Black Falcon	BMW M4 GT4 Gen II		(United Kingdom) Jimmy Broadbent	(United Kingdom) Steve Alvarez Brown (Note: Alvarez Brown was banned and stripped of his Nordschleife permit for a Code 60 violation during the second qualifying practice session. The No. 150 BMW thus competed in the race as a three-man driver crew.)	(Netherlands) Misha Charoudin	(Germany) Manuel Metzger
160	(Germany) Adrenalin Motorsport Team Mainhattan Wheels	BMW M4 GT4		(Germany) Bernd Kleeschulte	(Japan) Ryusho Konishi	(Germany) Christian Kraus	(Germany) Laura Luft
176	(Germany) PROsport Racing	Aston Martin Vantage AMR GT4		(Germany) Arno Klasen	(Italy) Lorenzo Rocco di Torrepadula	(Sweden) Eric Ullström	(Germany) Jörg Viebahn
269	(Germany) Dörr Motorsport	Aston Martin Vantage AMR GT4		(France) Philippe Charlaix	(Germany) Peter Posavc	(Germany) Sven Schädler	(Germany) Frank Weishar
SP 7 (2 entries)
80	(Germany) Plusline Racing Team	Porsche 718 Cayman GT4 RS Clubsport		(Germany) Christian Knötschke	(Germany) Reiner Neuffer	(Germany) Christoph Ruhrmann	(Germany) Fabio Sacchi
978	(Germany) KKrämer Racing	Porsche Cayman GT4 Clubsport		(Germany) Olaf Baunack	(Germany) Karl-Heinz Meyer	(Germany) Gregor Starck	(Germany) Guido Tönnessen
SP 6 (1 entry)
207	(Switzerland) Hofor-Racing by Kuepperracing	BMW M3 E46		(Switzerland) Michael Kroll	(Germany) Thomas Mühlenz	(Switzerland) Alexander Prinz	(Switzerland) Chantal Prinz
SP 4T (2 entries)
88	(Japan) Subaru Tecnica International	Subaru WRX STI GT N24		(Netherlands) Carlo van Dam	(Japan) Rintaro Kubo	(Japan) Kota Sasaki	(Germany) Tim Schrick
89	(Belgium) HY Racing/AMC Sankt Vith	Porsche 718 Cayman GT4 Clubsport		(Italy) Bruno Barbaro	(Belgium) Jacques Derenne	(Belgium) Olivier Muytjens	(France) Fabrice Reicher
SP 4 (1 entry)
152	(Germany) Oepen Motors Automobilsport	BMW 325CI		(Germany) Thorsten Köppert	(Germany) Henrik Launhardt	(Germany) Ingo Oepen	
SP 3T (5 entries)
13	(Germany) White Angel for Fly and Help	Volkswagen New Beetle RSR		(Germany) Bernd Albrecht	(Germany) Sebastian Asch	(Germany) Carsten Knechtges	(Germany) Julian Reeh
311	(Germany) 2R Racing	Audi TTS		(Germany) Wolfgang Haugg	(Germany) Rudi Speich	(Germany) Roland Waschkau	
317	(Germany) Bulldog Racing	MINI Cooper JCW Pro		(United Kingdom) Charles Cooper	(Austria) Markus Fischer	(Germany) Christoph Kragenings	(Germany) Sebastian Sauerbrei
318	(Germany) Ollis Garage Racing	Dacia Logan		(Germany) Oliver Kriese	(Germany) Michael Lachmayer	(Germany) Yannik Lachmayer	(Germany) Maximilian Weissermel
776	(Armenia) Goroyan RT by sharky-racing	Volkswagen Golf GTI TCR		(Germany) Stephan Epp	(Armenia) Artur Goroyan	(Armenia) Roman Mavlanov	(Germany) Joris Primke
SP 3 (1 entry)
275	(Netherlands) Ravenol Motorsport by MDM Racing	BMW 318ti Cup		(Germany) Alexander Becker	(Germany) Christopher Groth	(Germany) Marc David Müller	
V6 (4 entries)
396	(Germany) Adrenalin Motorsport Team Mainhattan Wheels	Porsche Cayman S		(Spain) Carlos Arimón	(Germany) Christian Büllesbach	(Germany) Stefan Kruse	(Germany) Andreas Schettler
400	(Germany) Adrenalin Motorsport Team Mainhattan Wheels	Porsche Cayman S		(Denmark) Rasmus Helmich	(Mexico) Xavier Lamadrid	(Australia) César Mendieta	(Mexico) Luis A. Ramírez
410	(Germany) rent2Drive-racing	Porsche Cayman GTS		(Germany) David Ackermann	(Germany) Georg Arbinger	(Italy) Stefano Croci	(Germany) Axel Jahn
416	(Germany) Köppen Motorsport	Porsche 911 Carrera		(Luxembourg) Yann Munhowen	(Germany) Sebastian Rings	(Germany) John Lee Schambony	(Germany) Andreas Schaflitzl
V5 (3 entries)
443	(Germany) asBest Racing	Porsche Cayman CM12		(Switzerland) Peter Baumann	(Switzerland) Dominic Kulpowicz	(Germany) Robert Neumann	(Germany) Matthias Trinius
444	(Germany) Adrenalin Motorsport Team Mainhattan Wheels	Porsche Cayman CM12		(Germany) Klaus Faßbender	(Germany) Daniel Korn	(Germany) Tobias Korn	(Germany) Ulrich Korn
446	(Germany) Fastlane Racing	Porsche Cayman CM12		(Germany) Stefan Gaukler	(Germany) Marcel Haas	(Germany) Benedikt Höpfer	(Poland) Jacek Pydys
V4 (4 entries)
702	(Germany) IFB powered by QTQ-Raceperformance	BMW 328i L		(Germany) Oliver Frisse	(Germany) Richard Gresek	(Germany) Jürgen Huber	(Germany) Simon Sagmeister
711	(Germany) EiFelkind Racing Team	BMW 325i		(Austria) Michael Fischer	(Germany) Henning Hausmeier	(Germany) Desiree Müller	(Germany) Tim Lukas Müller
747	(United States) Rockstar Games by Viken Motorsport	BMW 325i		(Germany) Markus Löw	(United Kingdom) Benjamin Lyons		
750	(Germany) Keeevin Sports and Racing	BMW 325i		(Sweden) Dan Berghult	(Brazil) Flavia Pellegrino Fernandes	(Finland) Juha Miettinen	(Sweden) Jonas Nilsson
VT3 (1 entry)
599	(Germany) Keeevin Sports and Racing	BMW 335i		(Germany) Meik ter Haar	(Germany) Jörg Schönfelder	(Germany) Serge Van Vooren	(Switzerland) Guido Wirtz
VT2 (16 entries)
268	(Germany) Jaco's Paddock Motorsport	BMW 330i Racing	VTH	(Japan) Takashi Ito	(Japan) Masato Mitsuhashi	(Malaysia) Chong Kiat Wai	
474	(Germany) Bulldog Racing	MINI John Cooper Works	VTF	(Germany) Michael Bräutigam	(Germany) Andreas Hilgers	(Germany) Sascha Korte	(Germany) Marco Zabel
477	(Germany) asBest Racing	Volkswagen Scirocco R TSI	VTF	(Switzerland) Thomas Alpiger	(Germany) Martin Heidrich	(Germany) Christian Koger	(Germany) Henrik Seibel
486	(South Korea) Hyundai Driving Experience	Hyundai i30 Fastback N	VTF	(Germany) Michael Bohrer	(Germany) Jens Dralle	(South Korea) Gyumin Kim	(Germany) Marcus Willhardt
488	(Germany) Keeevin Sports and Racing	Renault Mégane III RS	VTF	(Poland) Rafał Gieras	(Poland) Sebastian Ławniczek	(Poland) Daniel Sowada	
495	(Germany) Auto Thomas by Jung Motorsport	Cupra Leon KL	VTF	(Germany) Lars Füting	(Germany) Tobias Jung	(Germany) Tim Robertz	(Germany) Marcel Unland
496	(Germany) Auto Thomas by Jung Motorsport	Cupra Leon KL	VTF	(Germany) Michael Eichhorn	(United States) Tony Roma	(Germany) Volker Strycek	(Germany) Andreas Winterwerber
500	(Germany) Adrenalin Motorsport Team Mainhattan Wheels	BMW 330i Racing (2020)	VTH	(Germany) Jacob Erlbacher	(Germany) Philipp Leisen	(France) Leo Messenger	(Germany) Daniel Zils
501	(Germany) Adrenalin Motorsport Team Mainhattan Wheels	BMW 330i Racing (2020)	VTH	(France) Joël Le Bihan	(Germany) "Sub7BTG"	(Germany) Sebastian Tauber	(Germany) Andreas Winkler
502	(Singapore) Giti Tire Motorsport by WS Racing	BMW 328i Racing	VTH	(France) Grégoire Boutonnet	(Germany) Maximilian Eisberg	(Germany) Robert Hinzer	(Germany) Bernd Küpper
504	(Germany) SRS Team Sorg Rennsport	BMW 330i Racing (2020)	VTH	(Germany) Mathias Baar	(Netherlands) Piet-Jan Ooms	(Japan) Yutaka Seki	(Germany) Hans Joachim Theiß
505	(Germany) Time Attack Paderborn	BMW 328i Racing	VTH	(Germany) Fritz Hebig	(Denmark) Kaj Schubert	(Germany) Fabian Tillmann	(Germany) Michael Wolpertinger
506	(Singapore) Giti Tire Motorsport by WS Racing	BMW 328i Racing	VTH	(United Kingdom) James Breakell	(Germany) Christoph Merkt	(New Zealand) Wayne Moore	(Germany) Stephan Schroers
507	(Singapore) Giti Tire Motorsport by WS Racing	BMW 125i Racing	VTH	(Germany) Raphael Klingmann	(Germany) Matthias Möller	(Germany) Fabian Pirrone	(Germany) Jan Ullrich
510	(Germany) Dupré Engineering	Audi S3 Sedan Racing	VTH	(Germany) Timo Beuth	(Germany) Christoph Dupré	(Germany) Joachim Nett	(Germany) Jürgen Nett
514	(Germany) SRS Team Sorg Rennsport	BMW 330i Racing (2020)	VTH	(Italy) Alberto Carobbio	(Germany) Julius Meinhardt	(New Zealand) Guy Stewart	(Italy) Ugo Vicenzi
AT3 (6 entries)
10	(Germany) Max Kruse Racing	Volkswagen Golf GTI TCR		(Turkey) Emir Asari	(Monaco) Benjamin Cartery	(Germany) Timo Hochwind	(Germany) Matthias Wasel
50	(Germany) Max Kruse Racing	Volkswagen Golf GTI TCR Clubsport 24h		(Germany) Heiko Hammel	(Sweden) Johan Kristoffersson	(Germany) Benjamin Leuchter	(Germany) Nicholas Otto
227	(Germany) eFuel Team Griesemann	Toyota GR Supra GT4 Evo		(Germany) Dirk Adorf	(Germany) Björn Griesemann	(Germany) Georg Griesemann	(Germany) Yves Volte
420	(Germany) Four Motors Bioconcept-Car	Porsche 718 Cayman GT4 RS Clubsport		(Germany) Matthias Beckwermert	(Germany) Alesia Kreutzpointner	(Germany) Jacqueline Kreutzpointner	(Switzerland) Marc Schöni
633	(Germany) Four Motors Bioconcept-Car	Porsche 718 Cayman GT4 RS Clubsport		(Germany) Henning Cramer	(Germany) Karl Pflanz	(Germany) Oliver Sprungmann	(Switzerland) Marco Timbal
888	(Switzerland) Hofor-Racing by Bonk Motorsport	BMW M4 GT4 Gen II		(Switzerland) Martin Kroll	(Germany) Max Partl	(Germany) Michael Schrey	(Germany) Jörg Weidinger
AT2 (1 entry)
320	(Germany) Four Motors Bioconcept-Car	Porsche 992 GT3 Cup		(Denmark) Henrik Bollerslev	(Germany) Michelle Halder	(Germany) Thomas von Löwis of Menar	(Germany) "Smudo"
M240i (5 entries)
650	(Germany) Adrenalin Motorsport Team Mainhattan Wheels	BMW M240i Racing Cup		(Germany) Nick Deissler	(Germany) Sven Markert	(Switzerland) Ranko Mijatovic	(Germany) Philipp Stahlschmidt
651	(Germany) Adrenalin Motorsport Team Mainhattan Wheels	BMW M240i Racing Cup		(Germany) Yannik Himmels	(Germany) Maximilian Kurz	(Germany) Marvin Marino	(Germany) Riccardo Petrolo
652	(Germany) Adrenalin Motorsport Team Mainhattan Wheels	BMW M240i Racing Cup		(Germany) Thomas Ardelt	(Germany) Manuel Dormagen	(Germany) Florian Ebener	(Germany) Sven Oepen
653	(Germany) Adrenalin Motorsport Team Mainhattan Wheels	BMW M240i Racing Cup		(Germany) Rudolf Brandl	(Germany) Sebastian Brandl	(Germany) Danny Brink	(Germany) Ferdinand Wernet
680	(Germany) Up2Race	BMW M240i Racing Cup		(Germany) Daniel Dörrschuck	(Germany) Jannik Reinhard	(Germany) Carlo Scholl	(Germany) Kevin Wambach

Icon	Class
GT3 entries
P	SP9 GT3-Pro
PA	SP9 GT3 Pro-Am
GT2 entries
PA	SP11 GT2 Pro-Am
992 entries
Icon	Class
P	Cup 2-Pro
Am	Cup 2-Am
Cayman GT4 entries
Icon	Class
P	Cup 3-Pro
Am	Cup 3-Am
SPX entries
Icon	Class
P	SPX Pro
PA	SPX Pro-Am
VT2 Production entries
VTF	VT2 Front
VTH	VT2 Hecka

== Qualifying ==
=== Top Qualifying / Starting Group 1 ===
Pos.	Class	No.	Team	Car	Fastest lap from Qualifying 1, 2 and 3	Top Qualifying 1	Top Qualifying 2
1	SP 9 Pro	72	(Germany) BMW M Team RMG	BMW M4 GT3	8:13.518	8:12.070	8:10.992
2	SP 9 Pro	911	(Germany) Manthey EMA	Porsche 911 GT3 R (992)	8:17.420	—N/a	8:11.398
3	SP 9 Pro	16	(Germany) Scherer Sport PHX	Audi R8 LMS Evo II	8:16.634	—N/a	8:11.406
4	SP 9 Pro	27	(Germany) Red Bull Team ABT	Lamborghini Huracán GT3 Evo 2	8:18.508	—N/a	8:11.508
5	SP 9 Pro	15	(Germany) Scherer Sport PHX	Audi R8 LMS Evo II	8:17.466	—N/a	8:11.545
6	SP 9 Pro	1	(Germany) Frikadelli Racing Team	Ferrari 296 GT3	8:18.191	8:10.889	8:12.156
7	SP 9 Pro	99	(Germany) Rowe Racing	BMW M4 GT3	8:17.634	8:11.716	8:12.157
8	SP 9 Pro	130	(Germany) Mercedes-AMG Team GetSpeed	Mercedes-AMG GT3 Evo	8:16.982	8:12.310	8:13.125
9	SP 9 Pro	4	(Germany) Mercedes-AMG Team Bilstein by HRT	Mercedes-AMG GT3 Evo	8:19.146	—N/a	8:13.197
10	SP 9 Pro	33	(Germany) Falken Motorsports	Porsche 911 GT3 R (992)	8:18.871	—N/a	8:13.692
11	SP 9 Pro	3	(Germany) Mercedes-AMG Team Bilstein by HRT	Mercedes-AMG GT3 Evo	8:20.065	8:13.863	8:13.707
12	SP 9 Pro-Am	24	(Germany) Lionspeed GP	Porsche 911 GT3 R (992)	8:20.392	—N/a	8:13.770
13	SP 9 Pro-Am	6	(Germany) Team Advan x HRT	Mercedes-AMG GT3 Evo	8:29.232	—N/a	8:14.308
14	SP 9 Pro	44	(Germany) Falken Motorsports	Porsche 911 GT3 R (992)	8:18.822	—N/a	8:15.208
15	SP 9 Pro	5	(Germany) Herberth Motorsport	Porsche 911 GT3 R (992)	8:18.629	—N/a	8:15.237
16	SP 9 Pro-Am	35	(Germany) Walkenhorst Motorsport	Aston Martin Vantage AMR GT3 Evo	8:21.258	—N/a	8:18.687
17	SP 9 Pro-Am	71	(Lithuania) Juta Racing	Audi R8 LMS Evo II	8:25.988	—N/a	8:19.086
18	SP 9 Pro	8	(Germany) Mercedes-AMG Team GetSpeed	Mercedes-AMG GT3 Evo	8:21.048	8:14.002	—N/a
19	SP 9 Pro	34	(Germany) Walkenhorst Motorsport	Aston Martin Vantage AMR GT3 Evo	8:18.310	8:14.393	—N/a
20	SP 9 Pro	17	(Germany) PROsport Racing	Aston Martin Vantage AMR GT3	8:17.983	8:14.474	—N/a
21	SP 9 Pro	98	(Germany) Rowe Racing	BMW M4 GT3	8:18.672	8:14.696	—N/a
22	SP 9 Pro-Am	11	(Germany) Schnitzelalm Racing	Mercedes-AMG GT3 Evo	8:18.083	8:16.616	—N/a
23	SP 9 Pro	54	(Italy) Dinamic GT	Porsche 911 GT3 R (992)	8:19.989	8:18.693	—N/a
24	SP 9 Pro-Am	7	(Austria) Konrad Motorsport	Lamborghini Huracán GT3 Evo	8:17.759	8:19.207	—N/a
25	SP 9 Pro-Am	36	(Germany) Walkenhorst Motorsport	Aston Martin Vantage AMR GT3 Evo	8:45.098	8:35.646	—N/a
26	SPX Pro-Am	60	(South Korea) Hankook Competition	Porsche 992 GT3 Cup	8:42.904	8:45.425	—N/a
27	SPX Pro	706	(United States) Glickenhaus Racing LLC	Glickenhaus SCG 004c	8:16.051	—N/a	—N/a

=== Starting Group 2 ===
Pos.	Class	No.	Team	Car	Fastest lap from Qualifying 1, 2 and 3
1	Cup2 Pro	148	(Germany) Black Falcon Team 48 LOSCH	Porsche 992 GT3 Cup	8:28.887
2	Cup2 Pro	116	(Germany) Scherer Sport PHX	Porsche 992 GT3 Cup	8:30.144
3	Cup2 Pro	119	(Germany) Clickversicherungs Team	Porsche 992 GT3 Cup	8:30.244
4	Cup2 Pro	103	(Germany) Black Falcon	Porsche 992 GT3 Cup	8:31.032
5	Cup2 Pro	121	(Germany) KKrämer Racing	Porsche 992 GT3 Cup	8:31.936
6	Cup2 Pro	131	(Germany) Teichmann Racing	Porsche 992 GT3 Cup	8:35.175
7	Cup2 Pro	127	(Germany) Max Kruse Racing	Porsche 992 GT3 Cup	8:35.895
8	Cup2 Pro	122	(Belgium) Mühlner Motorsport	Porsche 992 GT3 Cup	8:36.883
9	Cup2 Pro	125	(Germany) Huber Motorsport	Porsche 992 GT3 Cup	8:38.337
10	Cup2 Pro	124	(Belgium) Mühlner Motorsport	Porsche 992 GT3 Cup	8:40.083
11	Cup2 Am	112	(Germany) KKrämer Racing	Porsche 992 GT3 Cup	8:40.263
12	SP 11 Pro-Am	55	(Germany) Dörr Motorsport	KTM X-Bow GT2	8:37.908 (Note: The No. 55 Dörr Motorsport received a 3-place grid penalty for causing a collision.)
13	Cup2 Am	107	(Germany) RPM Racing	Porsche 992 GT3 Cup	8:40.792
14	Cup2 Pro	123	(Belgium) Mühlner Motorsport	Porsche 992 GT3 Cup	8:42.805
15	AT2	320	(Germany) Four Motors Bioconcept-Car	Porsche 992 GT3 Cup	8:49.674
16	AT3	50	(Germany) Max Kruse Racing	Volkswagen Golf GTI TCR Clubsport 24h	8:53.239
17	SP 8T	150	(Germany) Team Bilstein by Black Falcon	BMW M4 GT4 Gen II	8:55.761
18	SP 10	169	(Germany) Dörr Motorsport	Aston Martin Vantage AMR GT4	8:55.769
19	SP 8T	145	(Germany) Cerny Motorsport	BMW M4 GT4 Gen II	8:56.863
20	Cup3 Am	959	(Germany) SRS Team Sorg Rennsport	Porsche 718 Cayman GT4 RS Clubsport	8:56.889
21	TCR	831	(South Korea) Hyundai Motorsport N	Hyundai Elantra N TCR (2024)	8:57.658
22	TCR	830	(South Korea) Hyundai Motorsport N	Hyundai Elantra N TCR (2024)	8:57.988
23	SP 10	164	(Germany) W&S Motorsport	Porsche 718 Cayman GT4 RS Clubsport	8:59.449
24	AT3	888	(Switzerland) Hofor-Racing by Bonk Motorsport	BMW M4 GT4 Gen II	8:59.508
25	Cup3 Pro	962	(Germany) AVIA W&S Motorsport	Porsche 718 Cayman GT4 RS Clubsport	8:59.618
26	SP 10	175	(Germany) PROsport Racing	Aston Martin Vantage AMR GT4	9:00.779
27	SP 10	165	(Germany) Schmickler Performance powered by Ravenol	Porsche 718 Cayman GT4 RS Clubsport	9:01.734
28	AT3	227	(Germany) eFuel Team Griesemann	Toyota GR Supra GT4 Evo	9:03.056
29	SP 10	187	(Germany) FK Performance Motorsport	BMW M4 GT4 Gen II	9:03.583
30	Cup3 Pro	969	(Germany) SRS Team Sorg Rennsport	Porsche 718 Cayman GT4 RS Clubsport	9:04.327
31	TCR	832	(South Korea) Hyundai Motorsport N	Hyundai Elantra N TCR (2024)	9:04.943
32	SP 10	170	(Germany) Toyo Tires with Ring Racing	Toyota GR Supra GT4 Evo	9:05.061
33	SP 10	77	(Germany) Black Falcon	BMW M4 GT4 Gen II	9:05.220
34	SP 10	188	(Germany) FK Performance Motorsport	BMW M4 GT4 Gen II	9:06.050
35	AT3	420	(Germany) Four Motors Bioconcept-Car	Porsche 718 Cayman GT4 RS Clubsport	9:08.160
36	Cup2 Am	106	(Germany) RPM Racing	Porsche 992 GT3 Cup	9:08.430
37	SP 10	191	(Germany) Walkenhorst Racing	BMW M4 GT4 Gen II	9:08.805
38	Cup3 Am	949	(Germany) SRS Team Sorg Rennsport	Porsche 718 Cayman GT4 RS Clubsport	9:09.895
39	SP 10	171	(Germany) Toyo Tires with Ring Racing	Toyota GR Supra GT4 Evo	9:10.683
40	SP 8T	269	(Germany) Dörr Motorsport	Aston Martin Vantage AMR GT4	9:11.790
41	SP 10	111	(Germany) Schnitzelalm Racing	Mercedes AMG GT4	9:14.132
42	SP 8T	146	(Singapore) Giti Tire Motorsport by WS Racing	BMW M4 GT4 Gen II	9:17.310
43	AT3	10	(Germany) Max Kruse Racing	Volkswagen Golf GTI TCR	9:18.253
44	SP 10	177	(Germany) PROsport Racing	Aston Martin Vantage AMR GT4	9:10.357 (Note: The No. 177 PROsport-Racing received a 5-place grid penalty for non-respect of flag signals.)
45	Cup3 Am	961	(Germany) W&S Motorsport	Porsche 718 Cayman GT4 RS Clubsport	9:22.845
46	Cup3 Pro	945	(Germany) Team mcchip-dkr	Porsche 718 Cayman GT4 RS Clubsport	9:25.379
47	SP 8T	147	(Singapore) Giti Tire Motorsport by WS Racing	BMW M4 GT4 Gen II	9:29.111
48	SP 10	181	(Germany) SRS Team Sorg Rennsport	Porsche 718 Cayman GT4 RS Clubsport	9:36.831
49	SP 8T	160	(Germany) Adrenalin Motorsport Team Mainhattan Wheels	BMW M4 GT4	9:42.153
50	AT3	633	(Germany) Four Motors Bioconcept-Car	Porsche 718 Cayman GT4 RS Clubsport	9:42.825
51	TCR	775	(Germany) sharky-racing	Audi RS 3 LMS TCR (2017)	9:45.934
52	SP 10	192	(Germany) Walkenhorst Racing	BMW M4 GT4 Gen II	9:47.800
53	SP 7	80	(Germany) Plusline Racing Team	Porsche 718 Cayman GT4 RS Clubsport	9:49.855
54	TCR	800	(Germany) asBest Racing	Volkswagen Golf GTI TCR	9:51.651
55	SP 10	180	(Germany) SRS Team Sorg Rennsport	Porsche 718 Cayman GT4 RS Clubsport	9:56.434
56	SP 7	978	(Germany) KKrämer Racing	Porsche Cayman GT4 Clubsport	10:47.473
57	SP 8T	176	(Germany) PROsport Racing	Aston Martin Vantage AMR GT4	—N/a

=== Starting Group 3 ===
Pos.	Class	No.	Team	Car	Fastest lap from Qualifying 1, 2 and 3
1	SP 4T	88	(Japan) Subaru Tecnica International	Subaru WRX STI GT N24	8:53.089
2	SP 3T	311	(Germany) 2R Racing	Audi TTS	9:20.226
3	SP 6	207	(Switzerland) Hofor-Racing by Kuepperracing	BMW M3 E46	9:25.541
4	SP 3T	13	(Germany) White Angel for Fly and Help	Volkswagen New Beetle RSR	9:30.076
5	SP 3T	776	(Armenia) Goroyan RT by sharky-racing	Volkswagen Golf GTI TCR	9:36.888
6	M240i	650	(Germany) Adrenalin Motorsport Team Mainhattan Wheels	BMW M240i Racing Cup	9:39.024
7	V6	396	(Germany) Adrenalin Motorsport Team Mainhattan Wheels	Porsche Cayman S	9:42.938
8	M240i	680	(Germany) Up2Race	BMW M240i Racing Cup	9:43.854
9	V6	416	(Germany) Köppen Motorsport	Porsche 911 Carrera	9:46.754
10	M240i	651	(Germany) Adrenalin Motorsport Team Mainhattan Wheels	BMW M240i Racing Cup	9:47.502
11	V5	446	(Germany) Fastlane Racing	Porsche Cayman CM12	9:52.895
12	VT2 Hecka	500	(Germany) Adrenalin Motorsport Team Mainhattan Wheels	BMW 330i Racing (2020)	9:53.431
13	VT2 Hecka	510	(Germany) Dupré Engineering	Audi S3 Sedan Racing	9:57.716
14	VT2 Hecka	504	(Germany) SRS Team Sorg Rennsport	BMW 330i Racing (2020)	9:58.147
15	VT2 Hecka	505	(Germany) Time Attack Paderborn	BMW 328i Racing	9:59.242
16	V6	410	(Germany) rent2Drive-racing	Porsche Cayman GTS	10:01.870
17	VT2 Front	486	(South Korea) Hyundai Driving Experience	Hyundai i30 Fastback N	10:08.080
18	SP 3T	317	(Germany) Bulldog Racing	MINI Cooper JCW Pro	10:10.921
19	V6	400	(Germany) Adrenalin Motorsport Team Mainhattan Wheels	Porsche Cayman S	10:12.044
20	VT2 Front	495	(Germany) Auto Thomas by Jung Motorsport	Cupra Leon KL	10:12.426
21	M240i	652	(Germany) Adrenalin Motorsport Team Mainhattan Wheels	BMW M240i Racing Cup	10:14.923
22	VT2 Hecka	514	(Germany) SRS Team Sorg Rennsport	BMW 330i Racing (2020)	10:15.405
23	V5	444	(Germany) Adrenalin Motorsport Team Mainhattan Wheels	Porsche Cayman CM12	10:15.972
24	V4	750	(Germany) Keeevin Sports and Racing	BMW 325i	10:22.708
25	V4	711	(Germany) EiFelkind Racing Team	BMW 325i	10:23.996
26	VT2 Front	477	(Germany) asBest Racing	Volkswagen Scirocco R TSI	10:24.332
27	V4	702	(Germany) IFB powered by QTQ-Raceperformance	BMW 328i L	10:26.811
28	VT2 Hecka	501	(Germany) Adrenalin Motorsport Team Mainhattan Wheels	BMW 330i Racing (2020)	10:28.551
29	VT2 Front	474	(Germany) Bulldog Racing	MINI John Cooper Works	10:28.879
30	VT2 Front	496	(Germany) Auto Thomas by Jung Motorsport	Cupra Leon KL	10:31.108
31	V4	747	(United States) Rockstar Games by Viken Motorsport	BMW 325i	10:33.270
32	VT2 Hecka	502	(Singapore) Giti Tire Motorsport by WS Racing	BMW 328i Racing	10:37.406
33	VT3	599	(Germany) Keeevin Sports and Racing	BMW 335i	10:37.563
34	V5	443	(Germany) asBest Racing	Porsche Cayman CM12	10:44.343
35	VT2 Hecka	506	(Singapore) Giti Tire Motorsport by WS Racing	BMW 328i Racing	10:44.982
36	SP 3	275	(Netherlands) Ravenol Motorsport by MDM Racing	BMW 318ti Cup	10:49.710
37	VT2 Hecka	507	(Singapore) Giti Tire Motorsport by WS Racing	BMW 125i Racing	10:54.214
38	VT2 Hecka	268	(Germany) Jaco's Paddock Motorsport	BMW 330i Racing	10:56.788
39	SP 3T	318	(Germany) Ollis Garage Racing	Dacia Logan	11:07.295
40	VT2 Front	488	(Germany) Keeevin Sports and Racing	Renault Mégane III RS	11:09.102
41	SP 4	152	(Germany) Oepen Motors Automobilsport	BMW 325CI	11:16.207
42	SP 4T	89	(Belgium) HY Racing/AMC Sankt Vith	Porsche 718 Cayman GT4 Clubsport	—N/a
43	M240i	653	(Germany) Adrenalin Motorsport Team Mainhattan Wheels	BMW M240i Racing Cup	—N/a

== Race result ==
The race was interrupted after 7 hours 24 minutes due to heavy fog that prevented visibility. No parc fermé rules were in place during the interruption. The race was resumed for 5 formation laps behind the safety car, but the chequered flag was eventually waved at 15:05:20 local time, 55 minutes before schedule. This was the shortest duration race in the history of the event. The race was won by the No. 16 Scherer Sport PHX, tying Manthey Racing for the record in overall victories at seven wins. It was the first win for Ricardo Feller, and the third for Frank Stippler and Christopher Mies.

Rowe Racing filed a protest following the race, and an appeal after the initial protest was turned down, arguing that the early stoppage after the safety car laps constituted an interruption, rather than a finish, but race officials rejected both the protest and appeal; thus, the results stood for Scherer Sport PHX.

- Class winners are denoted in **bold** and with ‡.
- Drivers in italics were entered in cars that completed the race, however did not complete the required 2 laps to be classified as a finisher.
- The minimum number of laps for classification at the finish (50% of the overall race winner's distance) was 25 laps.

Pos	Class	No	Team/Entrant	Drivers	Vehicle	Laps	Time/Retired
1	**SP 9 Pro**	**16**	**(Germany) Scherer Sport PHX**	**(Switzerland) Ricardo Feller (Germany) Dennis Marschall (Germany) Christopher Mies (Germany) Frank Stippler**	**Audi R8 LMS Evo II**	**50**	**23:05:27.680‡**
2	SP 9 Pro	911	(Germany) Manthey EMA	(France) Kévin Estre (Turkey) Ayhancan Güven (Austria) Thomas Preining (Belgium) Laurens Vanthoor	Porsche 911 GT3 R (992)	50	+0.603s
3	SP 9 Pro	72	(Germany) BMW M Team RMG	(United Kingdom) Daniel Harper (Germany) Max Hesse (Belgium) Charles Weerts	BMW M4 GT3 (G82)	50	+5.399s
4	SP 9 Pro	4	(Germany) Mercedes-AMG Team HRT	(Germany) Maximilian Götz (Spain) Daniel Juncadella (Germany) Luca Stolz	Mercedes-AMG GT3 Evo	50	+5.646s
5	SP 9 Pro	27	(Germany) Red Bull Team Abt	(Italy) Marco Mapelli (South Africa) Jordan Pepper (South Africa) Kelvin van der Linde	Lamborghini Huracán GT3 Evo 2	50	+6.168s
6	SP 9 Pro	33	(Germany) Falken Motorsports	(France) Julien Andlauer (Austria) Klaus Bachler (Germany) Sven Müller (Belgium) Alessio Picariello	Porsche 911 GT3 R (992)	50	+6.723s
7	SP 9 Pro	98	(Germany) Rowe Racing	(Brazil) Augusto Farfus (Switzerland) Raffaele Marciello (Belgium) Maxime Martin (Germany) Marco Wittmann	BMW M4 GT3 (G82)	50	+24.601s
8	SP 9 Pro	15	(Germany) Scherer Sport PHX	(Switzerland) Ricardo Feller (Germany) Christopher Haase (Belgium) Frédéric Vervisch (Germany) Markus Winkelhock	Audi R8 LMS Evo II	50	+25.047s
9	**SP 9 Pro-Am**	**24**	**(Germany) Lionspeed GP**	**(Hong Kong) Antares Au (Netherlands) Indy Dontje (Germany) Patrick Kolb (Switzerland) Patric Niederhauser**	**Porsche 911 GT3 R (992)**	**50**	**+26.078s‡**
10	SP 9 Pro	44	(Germany) Falken Motorsports	(Sweden) Joel Eriksson (Germany) Tim Heinemann (Germany) Nico Menzel (Austria) Martin Ragginger	Porsche 911 GT3 R (992)	50	+26.909s
11	SP 9 Pro	3	(Germany) Mercedes-AMG Team Bilstein by HRT	(Italy) Michele Beretta (United Kingdom) Frank Bird (India) Arjun Maini (Germany) Jusuf Owega	Mercedes-AMG GT3 Evo	50	+28.483
12	SP 9 Pro	1	(Germany) Frikadelli Racing Team	(Germany) Felipe Fernández Laser (Germany) Daniel Keilwitz (Germany) Luca Ludwig (Argentina) Nicolás Varrone	Ferrari 296 GT3	50	+29.954
13	SP 9 Pro	54	(Italy) Dinamic GT	(Denmark) Bastian Buus (Germany) Marvin Dienst (Germany) Marco Holzer (Germany) Marco Seefried	Porsche 911 GT3 R (992)	50	+1:17.172
14	SP 9 Pro-Am	11	(Germany) Schnitzelalm Racing	(Germany) Jay Mo Härtling (Germany) Kenneth Heyer (Germany) Marcel Marchewicz	Mercedes-AMG GT3 Evo	49	+1 Lap
15	SP 9 Pro-Am	7	(Austria) Konrad Motorsport	(Netherlands) Colin Caresani (Germany) Torsten Kratz (Germany) Maximilian Paul (United States) Danny Soufi	Lamborghini Huracán GT3 Evo	49	+1 Lap
16	SP 9 Pro	5	(Germany) Herberth Motorsport	(Australia) Matt Campbell (Germany) Vincent Kolb (Norway) Dennis Olsen (Germany) Robert Renauer	Porsche 911 GT3 R (992)	49	+1 Lap
17	SP 9 Pro-Am	71	(Lithuania) Juta Racing	(Germany) Elia Erhart (Germany) Pierre Kaffer (Germany) Alexey Veremenko (Germany) "Selv"	Audi R8 LMS Evo II	49	+1 Lap
18	SP 9 Pro-Am	6	(Germany) Team Advan x HRT	(Estonia) Ralf Aron (Germany) Dennis Fetzer (Germany) Hubert Haupt (Germany) Salman Owega	Mercedes-AMG GT3 Evo	49	+1 Lap
19	SP 9 Pro-Am	35	(Germany) Walkenhorst Motorsport	(Germany) Patrick Assenheimer (United States) Chandler Hull (Germany) Benjamin Mazatis (Germany) Mike David Ortmann	Aston Martin Vantage AMR GT3 Evo	48	+2 Laps
20	**Cup2 Pro**	**103**	**(Germany) Black Falcon**	**(Turkey) Mustafa Mehmet Kaya (Italy) Gabriele Piana (Germany) Tim Scheerbarth (Germany) Mike Stursberg**	**Porsche 992 GT3 Cup**	**48**	**+2 Laps‡**
21	Cup2 Pro	116	(Germany) Scherer Sport PHX	(Germany) Christer Jöns (Germany) Thomas Kiefer (Luxembourg) Dylan Pereira (Netherlands) Larry ten Voorde	Porsche 992 GT3 Cup	48	+2 Laps
22	Cup2 Pro	121	(Germany) KKrämer Racing	(Germany) Christopher Brück (Germany) Michele Di Martino (Germany) Moritz Oberheim	Porsche 992 GT3 Cup	48	+2 Laps
23	Cup2 Pro	122	(Belgium) Mühlner Motorsport	(United Kingdom) Alex Brundle (Germany) Ben Bünnagel (Germany) Moritz Kranz (Germany) Michael Rebhan	Porsche 992 GT3 Cup	48	+2 Laps
24	Cup2 Pro	119	(Germany) Clickversicherungs Team	(Germany) Robin Chrzanowski (Germany) Kersten Jodexnis (New Zealand) Peter Scharmach (Germany) Nick Salewsky	Porsche 992 GT3 Cup	48	+2 Laps
25	Cup2 Pro	125	(Germany) Huber Motorsport	(Germany) David Beckmann (Germany) Thomas Kiefer (Germany) Mark Wallenwein (Germany) Hans Wehrmann	Porsche 992 GT3 Cup	48	+2 Laps
26	Cup2 Pro	127	(Germany) Max Kruse Racing	(Netherlands) Tom Coronel (Netherlands) Paul Meijer (Portugal) Tiago Monteiro (Netherlands) Jan Jaap van Roon	Porsche 992 GT3 Cup	47	+3 Laps
27	SP 9 Pro-Am	36	(Germany) Walkenhorst Motorsport	(Germany) Stefan Aust (Germany) Christian Bollrath (Norway) Anders Buchardt (Germany) Henry Walkenhorst	Aston Martin Vantage AMR GT3 Evo	46	+4 Laps
28	Cup2 Pro	123	(Belgium) Mühlner Motorsport	(Switzerland) Michelangelo Comazzi (Germany) Peter Terting (Germany) Tobias Vazquez-Garcia (Germany) Janis Waldow	Porsche 992 GT3 Cup	46	+4 Laps
29	**Cup2 Am**	**107**	**(Germany) RPM Racing**	**(Germany) Philip Hamprecht (Netherlands) Patrick Huisman (Sweden) Niclas Jönsson (United States) Tracy Krohn**	**Porsche 992 GT3 Cup**	**46**	**+4 Laps‡**
30	Cup2 Pro	148	(Germany) Black Falcon Team 48 LOSCH	(Luxembourg) Steve Jans (Germany) Tobias Müller (Netherlands) Morris Schuring	Porsche 992 GT3 Cup	45	+5 Laps
31	**SP 11 Pro-Am**	**55**	**(Germany) Dörr Motorsport**	**(Germany) Ben Dörr (Germany) Christian Gebhardt (Austria) Max Hofer (Germany) Fabian Vettel**	**KTM X-Bow GT2**	**45**	**+5 Laps‡**
32	**Cup3 Am**	**959**	**(Germany) SRS Team Sorg Rennsport**	**(Germany) Heiko Eichenberg (Germany) Fabio Grosse (Switzerland) Patrik Grütter**	**Porsche 718 Cayman GT4 RS Clubsport**	**45**	**+5 Laps‡**
33	**SP 10**	**188**	**(Germany) FK Performance Motorsport**	**(Germany) Nick Hancke (Netherlands) Maxime Oosten (Germany) Lorenz Stegmann (Germany) Nick Wüstenhagen**	**BMW M4 GT4 Gen II**	**45**	**+5 Laps‡**
34	**Cup3 Pro**	**962**	**(Germany) AVIA W&S Motorsport**	**(France) Joshua Bednarski (Finland) Philip Miemois (United States) Alec Udell (Germany) Niclas Wiedmann**	**Porsche 718 Cayman GT4 RS Clubsport**	**45**	**+5 Laps‡**
35	SP 10	187	(Germany) FK Performance Motorsport	(South Africa) Leyton Fourie (Germany) Yannick Fübrich (Germany) Christian Konnerth (United Kingdom) Joseph Warhurst	BMW M4 GT4 Gen II	45	+5 Laps
36	SP 10	111	(Germany) Schnitzelalm Racing	(Germany) Tim Neuser (Germany) David Schumacher (United States) David Thilenius (Germany) Moritz Wiskirchen	Mercedes-AMG GT4	45	+5 Laps
37	**SP 8T**	**145**	**(Germany) Cerny Motorsport**	**(Netherlands) Jeroen Bleekemolen (United Kingdom) Peter Cate (Germany) Timo Glock (Germany) Timo Scheider**	**BMW M4 GT4 Gen II**	**45**	**+5 Laps‡**
38	SP 8T	150	(Germany) Team Bilstein by Black Falcon	(United Kingdom) Jimmy Broadbent (Netherlands) Misha Charoudin (Germany) Manuel Metzger	BMW M4 GT4 Gen II	45	+5 Laps
39	SP 10	175	(Germany) PROsport Racing	(Germany) Christoph Breuer (Chile) Benjamín Hites (Switzerland) Jasmin Preisig (Germany) Reinhold Renger	Aston Martin Vantage AMR GT4	45	+5 Laps
40	Cup2 Am	112	(Germany) KKrämer Racing	(Germany) Karsten Krämer (Germany) Fidel Leib (Germany) Jacob Riegel (Germany) Jan-Erik Slooten	Porsche 992 GT3 Cup	45	+5 Laps
41	Cup3 Am	969	(Germany) SRS Team Sorg Rennsport	(Germany) Alex Fielenbach (Sweden) Tommy Graberg (Ukraine) Oleksiy Kikireshko (Germany) Rüdiger Schicht	Porsche 718 Cayman GT4 RS Clubsport	44	+6 Laps
42	**TCR**	**831**	**(South Korea) Hyundai Motorsport N**	**(United States) Mason Filippi (United States) Harry Gottsacker (United States) Bryson Morris (Canada) Mark Wilkins**	**Hyundai Elantra N TCR (2024)**	**44**	**+6 Laps‡**
43	**AT3**	**50**	**(Germany) Max Kruse Racing**	**(Germany) Heiko Hammel (Sweden) Johan Kristoffersson (Germany) Benjamin Leuchter (Germany) Nicholas Otto**	**Volkswagen Golf GTI TCR Clubsport 24h**	**44**	**+6 Laps‡**
44	SP 10	171	(Germany) Toyo Tires with Ring Racing	(Japan) Takayuki Kinoshita (Germany) Michael Tischner (Germany) Heiko Tönges	Toyota GR Supra GT4 Evo	44	+6 Laps
45	SP 10	170	(Germany) Toyo Tires with Ring Racing	(Germany) Andreas Gülden (Germany) Marc Hennerici (Germany) Tim Sandtler	Toyota GR Supra GT4 Evo	44	+6 Laps
46	AT3	888	(Switzerland) Hofor-Racing by Bonk Motorsport	(Switzerland) Martin Kroll (Germany) Max Partl (Germany) Michael Schrey (Germany) Jörg Weidinger	BMW M4 GT4 Gen II	44	+6 Laps
47	SP 8T	146	(Singapore) Giti Tire Motorsports by WS Racing	(United Kingdom) Pippa Mann (Germany) Carrie Schreiner (Netherlands) Beitske Visser (Liechtenstein) Fabienne Wohlwend	BMW M4 GT4 Gen II	44	+6 Laps
48	AT3	227	(Germany) eFuel Team Griesemann	(Germany) Dirk Adorf (Germany) Björn Griesemann (Germany) Georg Griesemann (Germany) Yves Volte	Toyota GR Supra GT4 Evo	44	+6 Laps
49	TCR	830	(South Korea) Hyundai Motorsport N	(Spain) Mikel Azcona (Germany) Marc Basseng (Germany) Manuel Lauck	Hyundai Elantra N TCR (2024)	44	+6 Laps
50	TCR	832	(South Korea) Hyundai Motorsport N	(China) Martin Cao (China) Xiaole He (Hong Kong) Andy Yan (China) Zhendong Zhang	Hyundai Elantra N TCR (2024)	44	+6 Laps
51	**SP 4T**	**88**	**(Japan) Subaru Tecnica International**	**(Netherlands) Carlo van Dam (Japan) Rintaro Kubo (Japan) Kota Sasaki (Germany) Tim Schrick**	**Subaru WRX STI GT N24**	**44**	**+6 Laps‡**
52	SP 10	191	(Germany) Walkenhorst Racing	(Belgium) Aris Balanian (Germany) Nico Hantke (Germany) Tobias Wahl	BMW M4 GT4 Gen II	44	+6 Laps
53	**AT2**	**320**	**(Germany) Four Motors Bioconcept-Car**	**(Denmark) Henrik Bollerslev (Germany) Michelle Halder (Germany) Thomas von Löwis of Menar (Germany) "Smudo"**	**Porsche 992 GT3 Cup**	**44**	**+6 Laps‡**
54	Cup3 Am	961	(Germany) W&S Motorsport	(Germany) Axel Duffner (Germany) Andreas Gabler (Germany) René Höber (Germany) Alexander Müller	Porsche 718 Cayman GT4 RS Clubsport	43	+7 Laps
55	**M240i**	**650**	**(Germany) Adrenalin Motorsport Team Mainhattan Wheels**	**(Germany) Nick Deissler (Germany) Sven Markert (Switzerland) Ranko Mijatovic (Germany) Philipp Stahlschmidt**	**BMW M240i Racing Cup**	**43**	**+7 Laps‡**
56	SP 10	177	(Germany) PROsport Racing	(Germany) Rudi Adams (Sweden) Gustav Bard (Belgium) Alexander Hommerson (Sweden) Patrick Skoog	Aston Martin Vantage AMR GT4	42	+8 Laps
57	Cup3 Pro	945	(Germany) Team mcchip-dkr	(Japan) Kohei Fukuda (Germany) Carl-Friedrich Kolb (Germany) Markus Nölken (Japan) Kouichi Okumura	Porsche 718 Cayman GT4 RS Clubsport	42	+8 Laps
58	SP 10	181	(Germany) SRS Team Sorg Rennsport	(Germany) Richard Jodexnis (Germany) Christoph Krombach (Germany) Kurt Strube (Austria) Bernhard Wagner	Porsche 718 Cayman GT4 RS Clubsport	42	+8 Laps
59	SP 8T	160	(Germany) Adrenalin Motorsport Team Mainhattan Wheels	(Germany) Bernd Kleeschulte (Japan) Ryusho Konishi (Germany) Christian Kraus (Germany) Laura Luft	BMW M4 GT4	42	+8 Laps
60	**SP 7**	**80**	**(Germany) Plusline Racing Team**	**(Germany) Christian Knötschke (Germany) Reiner Neuffer (Germany) Christoph Ruhrmann (Germany) Fabio Sacchi**	**Porsche 718 Cayman GT4 RS Clubsport**	**42**	**+8 Laps‡**
61	AT3	633	(Germany) Four Motors Bioconcept-Car	(Germany) Henning Cramer (Germany) Karl Pflanz (Germany) Oliver Sprungmann (Switzerland) Marco Timbal	Porsche 718 Cayman GT4 RS Clubsport	42	+8 Laps
62	**V6**	**416**	**(Germany) Köppen Motorsport**	**(Luxembourg) Yann Munhowen (Germany) Sebastian Rings (Germany) John Lee Schambony (Germany) Andreas Schaflitzl**	**Porsche 911 Carrera**	**42**	**+8 Laps‡**
63	V6	396	(Germany) Adrenalin Motorsport Team Mainhattan Wheels	(Spain) Carlos Arimón (Germany) Christian Büllesbach (Germany) Stefan Kruse (Germany) Andreas Schettler	Porsche Cayman S	42	+8 Laps
64	M240i	651	(Germany) Adrenalin Motorsport Team Mainhattan Wheels	(Germany) Yannik Himmels (Germany) Maximilian Kurz (Germany) Marvin Marino (Germany) Riccardo Petrolo	BMW M240i Racing Cup	42	+8 Laps
65	SP 8T	269	(Germany) Dörr Motorsport	(France) Philippe Charlaix (Germany) Peter Posavac (Germany) Sven Schädler (Germany) Frank Weishar	Aston Martin Vantage AMR GT4	42	+8 Laps
66	**SP X Pro**	**706**	**(United States) Glickenhaus Racing LLC**	**(Germany) Lance David Arnold (France) Côme Ledogar (France) Franck Mailleux (Germany) Thomas Mutsch**	**Glickenhaus SCG 004c**	**41**	**+9 Laps‡**
67	Cup2 Am	106	(Germany) RPM Racing	(Germany) Peter Bonk (South Korea) Jang Han Choi (Czech Republic) Milan Kodídek (Netherlands) Marco van Ramshorst	Porsche 992 GT3 Cup	41	+9 Laps
68	Cup2 Pro	131	(Germany) Teichmann Racing	(Germany) David Kiefer (Germany) Marius Kiefer (Germany) Stefan Kiefer (Austria) Luca Rettenbacher	Porsche 992 GT3 Cup	41	+9 Laps
69	TCR	800	(Germany) asBest Racing	(Germany) Meik Utsch (Japan) Junichi Umemoto (Germany) Jens Wulf (Jordan) Nadir Zuhour	Volkswagen Golf GTI TCR	41	+9 Laps
70	**SP X Pro-Am**	**60**	**(South Korea) Hankook Competition**	**(Netherlands) Roelof Bruins (Canada) Steven Cho (South Korea) Jongkyum Kim**	**Porsche 992 GT3 Cup**	**40**	**+10 Laps‡**
71	**SP 3T**	**317**	**(Germany) Bulldog Racing**	**(United Kingdom) Charles Cooper (Austria) Markus Fischer (Germany) Christoph Kragenings (Germany) Sebastian Sauerbrei**	**MINI Cooper JCW Pro**	**40**	**+10 Laps‡**
72	**VT2 Hecka**	**504**	**(Germany) SRS Team Sorg Rennsport**	**(Germany) Mathias Baar (Netherlands) Piet-Jan Ooms (Japan) Yutaka Seki (Germany) Hans Joachim Theiß**	**BMW 330i Racing (2020)**	**40**	**+10 Laps‡**
73	**VT2 Front**	**495**	**(Germany) Auto Thomas by Jung Motorsport**	**(Germany) Lars Füting (Germany) Tobias Jung (Germany) Tim Robertz (Germany) Marcel Unland**	**Cupra Leon KL**	**40**	**+10 Laps‡**
74	VT2 Front	486	(South Korea) Hyundai Driving Experience	(Germany) Michael Bohrer (Germany) Jens Dralle (South Korea) Gyumin Kim (Germany) Marcus Willhardt	Hyundai i30 Fastback N	40	+10 Laps
75	**V5**	**444**	**(Germany) Adrenalin Motorsport Team Mainhattan Wheels**	**(Germany) Klaus Faßbender (Germany) Daniel Korn (Germany) Tobias Korn (Germany) Ulrich Korn**	**Porsche Cayman CM12**	**40**	**+10 Laps‡**
76	VT2 Hecka	502	(Singapore) Giti Tire Motorsport by WS Racing	(France) Grégoire Boutonnet (Germany) Maximilian Eisberg (Germany) Robert Hinzer (Germany) Bernd Küpper	BMW 328i Racing	40	+10 Laps
77	V6	410	(Germany) rent2Drive-racing	(Germany) David Ackermann (Germany) Georg Arbinger (Italy) Stefano Croci (Germany) Axel Jahn	Porsche Cayman GTS	40	+10 Laps
78	VT2 Front	474	(Germany) Bulldog Racing	(Germany) Michael Bräutigam (Germany) Andreas Hilgers (Germany) Sascha Korte (Germany) Marco Zabel	MINI John Cooper Works	40	+10 Laps
79	M240i	652	(Germany) Adrenalin Motorsport Team Mainhattan Wheels	(Germany) Thomas Ardelt (Germany) Manuel Dormagen (Germany) Florian Ebener (Germany) Sven Oepen	BMW M240i Racing Cup	40	+10 Laps
80	SP 3T	13	(Germany) White Angel for Fly and Help	(Germany) Bernd Albrecht (Germany) Sebastian Asch (Germany) Carsten Knechtges (Germany) Julian Reeh	Volkswagen New Beetle RSR	40	+10 Laps
81	SP 10	169	(Germany) Dörr Motorsport	(Germany) Phil Dörr (Germany) Michael Funke (Norway) Oskar Sandberg (Germany) Aaron Wenisch	Aston Martin Vantage AMR GT4	39	+11 Laps
82	V6	400	(Germany) Adrenalin Motorsport Team Mainhattan Wheels	(Denmark) Rasmus Helmich (Mexico) Xavier Lamadrid (Australia) César Mendieta (Mexico) Luis A. Ramírez	Porsche Cayman S	39	+11 Laps
83	**V4**	**711**	**(Germany) EiFelkind Racing Team**	**(Austria) Michael Fischer (Germany) Henning Hausmeier (Germany) Desiree Müller (Germany) Tim Lukas Müller**	**BMW 325i**	**39**	**+11 Laps‡**
84	V4	747	(United States) Rockstar Games by Viken Motorsport	(Germany) Markus Löw (United Kingdom) Benjamin Lyons	BMW 325i	39	+11 Laps
85	VT2 Hecka	514	(Germany) SRS Team Sorg Rennsport	(Italy) Alberto Carobbio (Germany) Julius Meinhardt (New Zealand) Guy Stewart (Italy) Ugo Vicenzi	BMW 330i Racing (2020)	39	+11 Laps
86	V4	750	(Germany) Keeevin Sports and Racing	(Sweden) Dan Berghult (Brazil) Flavia Pellegrino Fernandes (Finland) Juha Miettinen (Sweden) Jonas Nilsson	BMW 325i	39	+11 Laps
87	VT2 Hecka	501	(Germany) Adrenalin Motorsport Team Mainhattan Wheels	(France) Joël Le Bihan (Germany) "Sub7BTG" (Germany) Sebastian Tauber (Germany) Andreas Winkler	BMW 330i Racing (2020)	39	+11 Laps
88	SP 10	164	(Germany) W&S Motorsport	(Germany) Stephan Brodmerkel (Germany) Hendrik Still (Germany) Jürgen Vöhringer (Germany) Finn Zulauf	Porsche 718 Cayman GT4 RS Clubsport	38	+12 Laps
89	SP 7	978	(Germany) KKrämer Racing	(Germany) Olaf Baunack (Germany) Karl-Heinz Meyer (Germany) Gregor Starck (Germany) Guido Tönnessen	Porsche Cayman GT4 Clubsport	38	+12 Laps
90	**VT3**	**599**	**(Germany) Keeevin Sports and Racing**	**(Germany) Meik ter Haar (Germany) Jörg Schönfelder (Germany) Serge Van Vooren (Switzerland) Guido Wirtz**	**BMW 325i**	**38**	**+12 Laps‡**
91	SP 4T	89	(Belgium) HY Racing/AMC Sankt Vith	(Italy) Bruno Barbaro (Belgium) Jacques Derenne (Belgium) Olivier Muytjens (France) Fabrice Reicher	Porsche 718 Cayman GT4 Clubsport	38	+12 Laps
92	V5	443	(Germany) asBest Racing	(Switzerland) Peter Baumann (Switzerland) Dominic Kulpowicz (Germany) Robert Neumann (Germany) Matthias Trinius	Porsche Cayman CM12	38	+12 Laps
93	VT2 Front	477	(Germany) asBest Racing	(Switzerland) Thomas Alpiger (Germany) Martin Heidrich (Germany) Christian Koger (Germany) Henrik Seibel	Volkswagen Scirocco R TSI	38	+12 Laps
94	VT2 Hecka	505	(Germany) Time Attack Paderborn	(Germany) Fritz Hebig (Denmark) Kaj Schubert (Germany) Fabian Tillmann (Germany) Michael Wolpertinger	BMW 328i Racing	38	+12 Laps
95	**SP 6**	**207**	**(Switzerland) Hofor-Racing by Kuepperracing**	**(Switzerland) Michael Kroll (Germany) Thomas Mühlenz (Switzerland) Alexander Prinz (Switzerland) Chantal Prinz**	**BMW M3 E46**	**37**	**+13 Laps‡**
96	SP 3T	776	(Armenia) Goroyan RT by sharky-racing	(Germany) Stephan Epp (Armenia) Artur Goroyan (Armenia) Roman Mavlanov (Germany) Joris Primke	Volkswagen Golf GTI TCR	36	+14 Laps
97	VT2 Hecka	268	(Germany) Jaco's Paddock Motorsport	(Japan) Takashi Ito (Japan) Masato Mitsuhashi (Malaysia) Chong Kiat Wai	BMW 330i Racing	36	+14 Laps
98	VT2 Hecka	510	(Germany) Dupré Engineering	(Germany) Timo Beuth (Germany) Christoph Dupré (Germany) Joachim Nett (Germany) Jürgen Nett	Audi S3 Sedan Racing	34	+16 Laps
99	VT2 Front	488	(Germany) Keeevin Sports and Racing	(Poland) Rafał Gieras (Poland) Sebastian Ławniczek (Poland) Daniel Sowada	Renault Mégane III RS	34	+16 Laps
100	**SP 4**	**152**	**(Germany) Oepen Motors Automobilsport**	**(Germany) Thorsten Köppert (Germany) Henrik Launhardt (Germany) Ingo Oepen**	**BMW 325CI**	**34**	**+16 Laps‡**
101	VT2 Hecka	506	(Singapore) Giti Tire Motorsport by WS Racing	(United Kingdom) James Breakell (Germany) Christoph Merkt (New Zealand) Wayne Moore (Germany) Stephan Schroers	BMW 328i Racing	34	+16 Laps
102	SP 3T	318	(Germany) Ollis Garage Racing	(Germany) Oliver Kriese (Germany) Michael Lachmayer (Germany) Yannik Lachmayer (Germany) Maximilian Weissermel	Dacia Logan	34	+16 Laps
103	SP 3T	311	(Germany) 2R Racing	(Germany) Wolfgang Haugg (Germany) Rudi Speich (Germany) Roland Waschkau	Audi TTS	34	+16 Laps
104	**SP 3**	**275**	**(Netherlands) Ravenol Motorsport by MDM Racing**	**(Germany) Alexander Becker (Germany) Christopher Groth (Germany) Marc David Müller**	**BMW 318ti Cup**	**31**	**+19 Laps‡**
105	M240i	653	(Germany) Adrenalin Motorsport Team Mainhattan Wheels	(Germany) Rudolf Brandl (Germany) Sebastian Brandl (Germany) Danny Brink (Germany) Ferdinand Wernet	BMW M240i Racing Cup	29	+21 Laps
NC	VT2 Front	496	(Germany) Auto Thomas by Jung Motorsport	(Germany) Michael Eichhorn (United States) Tony Roma (Germany) Volker Strycek (Germany) Andreas Winterwerber	Cupra Leon KL	24	Not Classified
NC	SP 10	192	(Germany) Walkenhorst Racing	(France) Jean-Christophe David (Germany) Andreas Ziegler	BMW M4 GT4 Gen II	13	Not Classified
DNF	SP 9 Pro	8	(Germany) Mercedes-AMG Team GetSpeed	(Austria) Lucas Auer (United Kingdom) Adam Christodoulou (Switzerland) Philip Ellis (Canada) Mikaël Grenier	Mercedes-AMG GT3 Evo	42	Did Not Finish
DNF	SP 9 Pro	130	(Germany) Mercedes-AMG Team GetSpeed	(United Kingdom) Adam Christodoulou (Germany) Maro Engel (Andorra) Jules Gounon (Germany) Fabian Schiller	Mercedes-AMG GT3 Evo	34	Did Not Finish
DNF	SP 10	180	(Germany) SRS Team Sorg Rennsport	(Germany) Henning Eschweiler (Germany) Heinz Jürgen Kroner (Germany) Lennard Paul Naumann (Germany) "Maximilian"	Porsche 718 Cayman GT4 RS Clubsport	33	Did Not Finish
DNF	VT2 Hecka	500	(Germany) Adrenalin Motorsport Team Mainhattan Wheels	(Germany) Jacob Erlbacher (Germany) Philipp Leisen (France) Leo Messenger (Germany) Daniel Zils	BMW 330i Racing (2020)	28	Did Not Finish
DNF	SP 9 Pro	34	(Germany) Walkenhorst Motorsport	(Poland) Kuba Giermaziak (Norway) Christian Krognes (United Kingdom) David Pittard (Denmark) Nicki Thiim	Aston Martin Vantage AMR GT3 Evo	26	Did Not Finish
DNF	SP 10	165	(Germany) Schmickler Performance powered by Ravenol	(Switzerland) Ivan Jacoma (Germany) Claudius Karch (Germany) Kai Riemer (Germany) Achim Wawer	Porsche 718 Cayman GT4 RS Clubsport	26	Did Not Finish
DNF	SP 9 Pro	17	(Germany) PROsport Racing	(Germany) Nico Bastian (Germany) Marek Böckmann (United Kingdom) Ben Green (Germany) Hugo Sasse	Aston Martin Vantage AMR GT3	23	Did Not Finish
DNF	TCR	775	(Germany) sharky-racing	(Germany) Leon Dreiser (Germany) Raphael Hundeborn (Germany) Stefan Lohn (Germany) Dirk Vleugels	Audi RS 3 LMS TCR (2017)	23	Did Not Finish
DNF	SP 9 Pro	99	(Germany) Rowe Racing	(Brazil) Augusto Farfus (Netherlands) Robin Frijns (South Africa) Sheldon van der Linde (Belgium) Dries Vanthoor	BMW M4 GT3	21	Did Not Finish
DNF	V5	446	(Germany) Fastlane Racing	(Germany) Stefan Gaukler (Germany) Marcel Haas (Germany) Benedikt Höpfer (Poland) Jacek Pydys	Porsche Cayman CM12	19	Did Not Finish
DNF	AT3	420	(Germany) Four Motors Bioconcept-Car	(Germany) Matthias Beckwermert (Germany) Alesia Kreutzpointner (Germany) Jacqueline Kreutzpointner (Switzerland) Marc Schöni	Porsche 718 Cayman GT4 RS Clubsport	18	Did Not Finish
DNF	SP 8T	147	(Singapore) Giti Tire Motorsport by WS Racing	(Germany) Lukas Drost (Germany) Ulrich Schmidt (Monaco) Micah Stanley	BMW M4 GT4 Gen II	17	Did Not Finish
DNF	VT2 Hecka	507	(Singapore) Giti Tire Motorsport by WS Racing	(Germany) Raphael Klingmann (Germany) Matthias Möller (Germany) Fabian Pirrone (Germany) Jan Ullrich	BMW 125i Racing	15	Did Not Finish
DNF	AT3	10	(Germany) Max Kruse Racing	(Turkey) Emir Asari (Monaco) Benjamin Cartery (Germany) Timo Hochwind (Germany) Matthias Wasel	Volkswagen Golf GTI TCR	13	Did Not Finish
DNF	SP 8T	176	(Germany) PROsport Racing	(Germany) Arno Klasen (Italy) Lorenzo Rocco di Torrepadula (Sweden) Eric Ullström (Germany) Jörg Viebahn	Aston Martin Vantage AMR GT4	12	Did Not Finish
DNF	V4	702	(Germany) IFB powered by QTQ-Raceperformance	(Germany) Oliver Frisse (Germany) Richard Gresek (Germany) Jürgen Huber (Germany) Simon Sagmeister	BMW 328i L	12	Did Not Finish
DNF	SP 10	77	(Germany) Black Falcon	(United States) Charles Espenlaub (United States) Ryan Harrison (United States) Mike Skeen (Romania) Alexandru Vasilescu	BMW M4 GT4 Gen II	9	Did Not Finish
DNF	Cup3 Am	949	(Germany) SRS Team Sorg Rennsport	(Italy) Edoardo Bugane (Switzerland) Philipp Hagnauer (United Kingdom) Harley Haughton (Germany) Björn Simon	Porsche 718 Cayman GT4 RS Clubsport	9	Did Not Finish
DNF	M240i	680	(Germany) Up2Race	(Germany) Daniel Dörrschuck (Germany) Jannik Reinhard (Germany) Carlo Scholl (Germany) Kevin Wambach	BMW M240i Racing Cup	5	Did Not Finish
DNF	Cup2 Pro	124	(Belgium) Mühlner Motorsport	(United Kingdom) Alex Brundle (Germany) Moritz Kranz (Germany) Peter Terting (Germany) Tobias Vazquez-Garcia	Porsche 992 GT3 Cup	1	Did Not Finish
Official results

== Bibliography ==
- Jörg-Richard Ufer & Tim Upietz. 24 Stunden Nürburgring Nordschleife 2024. Gruppe C Motorsport Verlag. ISBN 978-3-948501-32-7.
