= 2022 DTM Trophy =

Auto racing series held in 2022

The 2022 DTM Trophy was the third and final season of the DTM support series for GT cars eligible for E2-SH and E2-SC-class FIA categories. It was the first season where the BOP was made by AVL Racing. The series was run by ITR, the association also organising the Deutsche Tourenwagen Masters. The championship ran as part of selected DTM race weekends in 2022, commencing at the Lausitzring on 20 May and finishing on 9 October at the Hockenheimring. The series folded following the 2022 season after ADAC acquired the rights of the parent series and decided to continue running the ADAC GT4 Germany as its only GT4-series.

== Teams and drivers ==
All teams competed with tyres supplied by Hankook.

Manufacturer	Car	Team	No.	Driver	Status	Rounds
Aston Martin	Aston Martin Vantage AMR GT4	(Germany) Speed Monkeys	63	(Germany) Jacob Riegel		All
Aston Martin	Aston Martin Vantage AMR GT4	(Germany) Speed Monkeys	99	(Germany) Nick Hancke		All
Audi	Audi R8 LMS GT4 Evo	(Germany) Heide-Motorsport	17	(South Africa) Mikaeel Pitamber		1–3, 5
Audi	Audi R8 LMS GT4 Evo	(Germany) Heide-Motorsport	31	(Brazil) Thiago Vivacqua		All
Audi	Audi R8 LMS GT4 Evo	(Germany) Heide-Motorsport	48	(Germany) Sophie Hofmann		All
Audi	Audi R8 LMS GT4 Evo	(Germany) T3 Motorsport	66	(Finland) Matias Salonen		1
Audi	Audi R8 LMS GT4 Evo	(Germany) T3 Motorsport	77	(United States) John Paul Southern Jr.		1
Audi	Audi R8 LMS GT4 Evo	(Germany) Team Eastside Motorsport	77	(United States) John Paul Southern Jr.		2–3
BMW	BMW M4 GT4	(Germany) FK Performance Motorsport	5	(Bulgaria) Steriyan Folev		1–3, 5–7
BMW	BMW M4 GT4	(Germany) FK Performance Motorsport	11	(Germany) Moritz Löhner		All
BMW	BMW M4 GT4	(Germany) FK Performance Motorsport	12	(Spain) Marc de Fulgencio		All
BMW	BMW M4 GT4	(Germany) FK Performance Motorsport	23	(United States) Jordan Wallace		All
BMW	BMW M4 GT4	(Germany) Project 1	13	(Germany) Louis Henkefend		All
BMW	BMW M4 GT4	(Germany) Project 1	47	(Netherlands) Colin Caresani		All
BMW	BMW M4 GT4	(Germany) Walkenhorst Motorsport	34	(Germany) Theo Oeverhaus		All
KTM	KTM X-Bow GT4	(Czech Republic) RTR Projects	89	(Czech Republic) Josef Knopp	G	7
Mercedes-AMG	Mercedes-AMG GT4	(Germany) BWT Mücke Motorsport	18	(France) Edouard Cauhaupé		All
Mercedes-AMG	Mercedes-AMG GT4	(Germany) BWT Mücke Motorsport	19	(Mozambique) Rodrigo Almeida		All
Mercedes-AMG	Mercedes-AMG GT4	(Belgium) Selleslagh Racing Team	21	(United States) Alexandre Papadopulos		1–2, 4–7
Mercedes-AMG	Mercedes-AMG GT4	(Belgium) Selleslagh Racing Team	77	(United States) John Paul Southern Jr.	G	7
Mercedes-AMG	Mercedes-AMG GT4	(Germany) CV Performance Group	83	(Switzerland) Lucas Mauron	G	7
Mercedes-AMG	Mercedes-AMG GT4	(Germany) CV Performance Group	84	(Hungary) Phillippe Denes	G	7
Mercedes-AMG	Mercedes-AMG GT4	(Germany) CV Performance Group	85	(Austria) Nico Gruber	G	7
Porsche	Porsche 718 Cayman GT4 Clubsport	(Germany) Allied-Racing	22	(Germany) Vincent Andronaco	G	7
Porsche	Porsche 718 Cayman GT4 Clubsport	(Germany) Allied-Racing	33	(Germany) Egor Litvinenko	G	7
Porsche	Porsche 718 Cayman GT4 Clubsport	(Germany) KÜS Team Bernhard	25	(Germany) Daniel Gregor		All
Porsche	Porsche 718 Cayman GT4 Clubsport	(Germany) KÜS Team Bernhard	26	(Australia) Ricky Capo		All
Toyota	Toyota GR Supra GT4	Toyota Gazoo Racing Germany powered by Ring Racing	90	(Germany) Tim Heinemann		All

== Calendar ==
Round	Circuit	Location	Race 1	Race 2
1	(Germany) Lausitzring (GP Circuit with Banked Turn 1)	Klettwitz, Brandenburg	21 May	22 May
2	(Italy) Imola Circuit	Imola, Emilia-Romagna	18 June	19 June
3	(Germany) Norisring	Nuremberg, Bavaria	2 July	3 July
4	(Germany) Nürburgring (Sprint Circuit)	Nürburg, Rhineland-Palatinate	27 August	28 August
5	(Belgium) Circuit de Spa-Francorchamps	Stavelot, Liège	10 September	11 September
6	(Austria) Red Bull Ring	Spielberg, Styria	24 September	25 September
7	(Germany) Hockenheimring	Hockenheim, Baden-Württemberg	8 October	9 October

== Results and standings ==
=== Season summary ===
Round		Circuit	Pole position	Fastest lap	Winning driver	Winning team
1	R1	(Germany) Lausitzring (GP Circuit with Banked Turn 1)	(Germany) Tim Heinemann	(Germany) Tim Heinemann	(Germany) Tim Heinemann	Toyota Gazoo Racing Germany powered by Ring Racing
1	R2	(Germany) Lausitzring (GP Circuit with Banked Turn 1)	(Germany) Tim Heinemann	(Brazil) Thiago Vivacqua	(Germany) Tim Heinemann	Toyota Gazoo Racing Germany powered by Ring Racing
2	R1	(Italy) Imola Circuit	(France) Edouard Cauhaupé	(Netherlands) Colin Caresani	(Netherlands) Colin Caresani	(Germany) Project 1
2	R2	(Italy) Imola Circuit	(Germany) Jacob Riegel	(Netherlands) Colin Caresani	(Netherlands) Colin Caresani	(Germany) Project 1
3	R1	(Germany) Norisring	(United States) John Paul Southern Jr.	(Germany) Theo Oeverhaus	(Germany) Theo Oeverhaus	(Germany) Walkenhorst Motorsport
3	R2	(Germany) Norisring	(United States) John Paul Southern Jr.	(United States) John Paul Southern Jr.	(Germany) Louis Henkefend	(Germany) Project 1
4	R1	(Germany) Nürburgring (Sprint Circuit)	(Netherlands) Colin Caresani (Note: The Qualifying session was cancelled due to heavy fog. The grid was set by championship position.)	(Germany) Daniel Gregor	(Germany) Tim Heinemann	Toyota Gazoo Racing Germany powered by Ring Racing
4	R2	(Germany) Nürburgring (Sprint Circuit)	(Germany) Tim Heinemann	(France) Edouard Cauhaupé	(Germany) Tim Heinemann	Toyota Gazoo Racing Germany powered by Ring Racing
5	R1	(Belgium) Circuit de Spa-Francorchamps	(Germany) Theo Oeverhaus	(Germany) Daniel Gregor	(Germany) Daniel Gregor	(Germany) KÜS Team Bernhard
5	R2	(Belgium) Circuit de Spa-Francorchamps	(Germany) Tim Heinemann	(Germany) Tim Heinemann	(Germany) Tim Heinemann	Toyota Gazoo Racing Germany powered by Ring Racing
6	R1	(Austria) Red Bull Ring	(Brazil) Thiago Vivacqua	(Netherlands) Colin Caresani	(Netherlands) Colin Caresani	(Germany) Project 1
6	R2	(Austria) Red Bull Ring	(Germany) Daniel Gregor	(France) Edouard Cauhaupé	(Mozambique) Rodrigo Almeida	(Germany) BWT Mücke Motorsport
7	R1	(Germany) Hockenheimring	(Germany) Jacob Riegel	(Netherlands) Colin Caresani	(Netherlands) Colin Caresani	(Germany) Project 1
7	R2	(Germany) Hockenheimring	(Brazil) Thiago Vivacqua	(Germany) Tim Heinemann	(Germany) Tim Heinemann	Toyota Gazoo Racing Germany powered by Ring Racing

=== Scoring system ===
Points were awarded to the top ten classified finishers as follows:

Race Position	**1st**	**2nd**	**3rd**	**4th**	**5th**	**6th**	**7th**	**8th**	**9th**	**10th**
Points	25	18	15	12	10	8	6	4	2	1

Additionally, the top three placed drivers in qualifying also received points:

Qualifying Position	**1st**	**2nd**	**3rd**
Points	3	2	1

=== Drivers' championship ===
Pos.	Driver	LAU (Germany)		IMO (Italy)		NOR (Germany)		NÜR (Germany)		SPA (Belgium)		RBR (Austria)		HOC (Germany)		Points
1	(Germany) Tim Heinemann	**1**^{1}	**1**^{1}	Ret	4	2^{3}	7	1	**1**^{1}	9	**1**^{1}	12	2	6^{2}	1^{3}	235
2	(Netherlands) Colin Caresani	Ret	3	1^{2}	1	4	2	**4**	10	7	13	1^{2}	Ret	1^{3}	3	188
3	(Germany) Theo Oeverhaus	6	2	4	8	1	5	11	Ret	**2**^{1}	2	7	9	3	2	158
4	(Brazil) Thiago Vivacqua	2^{2}	4^{2}	Ret	11	3	Ret^{2}	3	5	3	NC	**2**^{1}	3^{3}	Ret	**11**^{1}	134
5	(Mozambique) Rodrigo Almeida	5	5^{3}	6	9	Ret	3	7	Ret	13	6	4	1	8	7	111
6	(France) Edouard Cauhaupé	8	8	**5**^{1}	3^{2}	Ret	Ret^{3}	5	6	6	7	Ret	5	2	Ret^{2}	102
7	(Germany) Louis Henkefend	11	16	7	6	5	1	6	Ret	8	Ret	5	6	12	6	91
8	(Germany) Jacob Riegel	13	Ret	2^{3}	**2**^{1}	Ret	DNS	Ret	7	11	4^{2}	3	11	**7**^{1}	12	87
9	(Germany) Daniel Gregor	14	9	WD	WD	10^{2}	Ret	2	3^{3}	1^{2}	Ret^{3}	14	**4**^{1}	DNS	Ret	85
10	(Germany) Nick Hancke	4	6	Ret	5	6	9	9	11	4^{3}	5	6	7	Ret	Ret	79
11	(Germany) Moritz Löhner	12	14	3	10	7	Ret	8	4	15	3	8	12	5	Ret	69
12	(United States) John Paul Southern Jr. (Note: Southern was ineligible to score points only in the final round, as he was entered as a guest driver.)	3^{3}	10	10	7	**Ret**^{1}	**4**^{1}							19	13	43
13	(Australia) Ricky Capo	7	15	Ret	17^{3}	DNS	Ret	Ret	2^{2}	5	14	9^{3}	Ret^{2}	18	Ret	42
14	(Spain) Marc de Fulgencio	10	7	8	12	Ret	Ret	10	8	10	Ret	11	8	13	4	34
15	(United States) Alexandre Papadopulos	19	13	9	13			12	9	14	8	10	10	9	10	18
16	(United States) Jordan Wallace	17	Ret	11	14	9	8	13	12	17	10	15	15	15	9	13
17	(Bulgaria) Steriyan Folev	18	12	Ret	16	Ret	6			16	9	Ret	13	16	Ret	10
18	(Germany) Sophie Hofmann	15	11	13	DNS	8	10	14	Ret	18	12	13	14	17	14	5
19	(Finland) Matias Salonen	9	Ret													2
20	(South Africa) Mikaeel Pitamber	16	Ret	12	15	Ret	DNS			12	11					0
Guest drivers ineligible to score points
—	(Germany) Vincent Andronaco													4	Ret	0
—	(Hungary) Phillippe Denes													10	5	0
—	(Austria) Nico Gruber													11	8	0
—	(Czech Republic) Josef Knopp													14	Ret	0
—	(Germany) Egor Litvinenko													20	15	0
—	(Switzerland) Lucas Mauron													Ret	Ret	0

Colour	Result
Gold	Winner
Silver	Second place
Bronze	Third place
Green	Points classification
Blue	Non-points classification
Blue	Non-classified finish (NC)
Purple	Retired, not classified (Ret)
Red	Did not qualify (DNQ)
Red	Did not pre-qualify (DNPQ)
Black	Disqualified (DSQ)
White	Did not start (DNS)
White	Withdrew (WD)
White	Race cancelled (C)
Blank	Did not practice (DNP)
Blank	Did not arrive (DNA)
Blank	Excluded (EX)

**Bold** – Pole
Italics – Fastest Lap

=== Teams' championship ===
Pos.	Team	Points
1	(Germany) Project 1	275
2	Toyota Gazoo Racing Germany powered by Ring Racing	231
3	(Germany) BWT Mücke Motorsport	209
4	(Germany) Speed Monkeys	166
5	(Germany) Walkenhorst Motorsport	157
6	(Germany) Heide-Motorsport	135
7	(Germany) FK Performance Motorsport	126
8	(Germany) KÜS Team Bernhard	125
9	(Germany) Team Eastside Motorsport	42
10	(Belgium) Selleslagh Racing Team	18
11	(Germany) T3 Motorsport	2
