= Jacob Riegel =

German racing driver (born 2004)

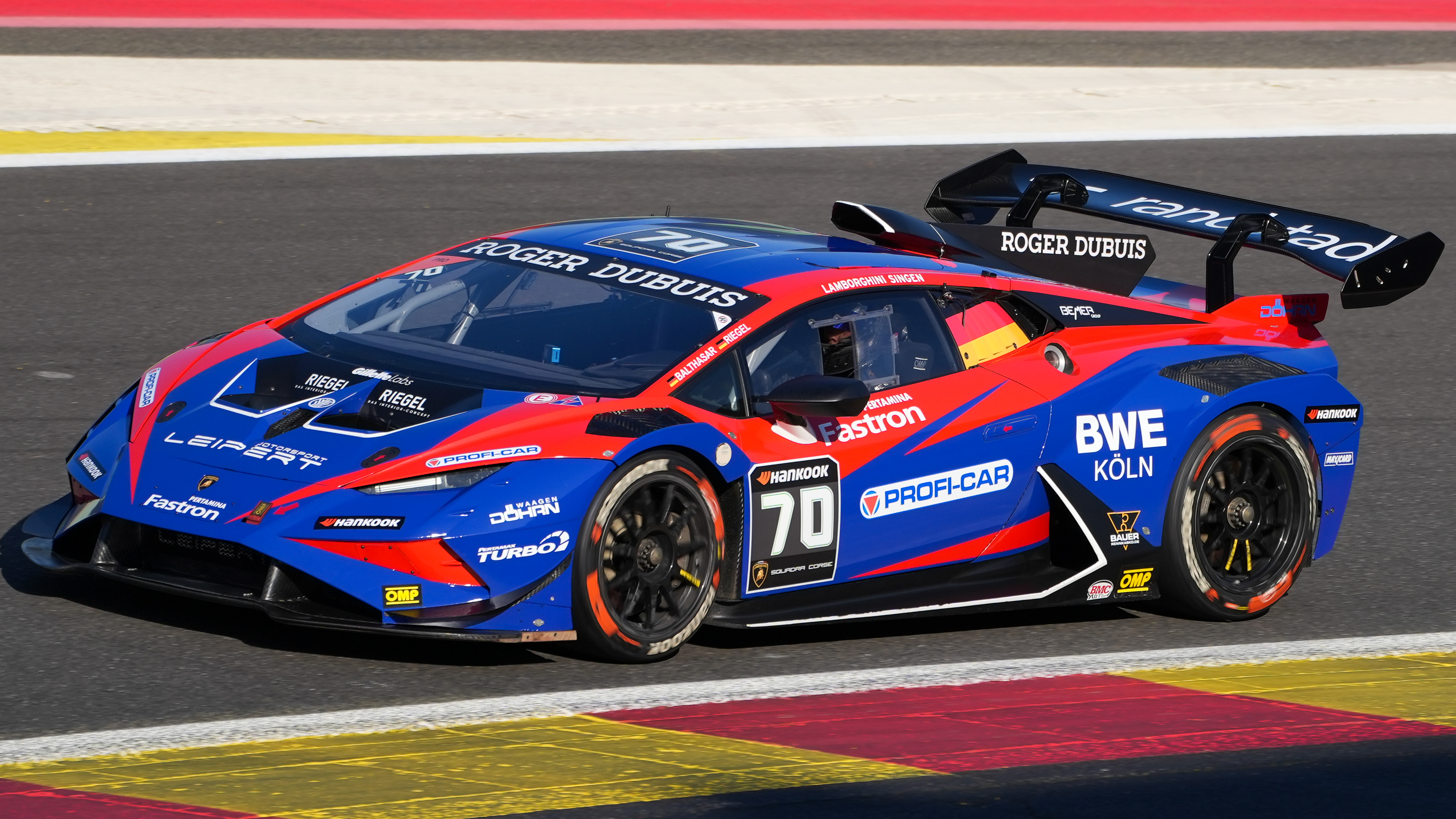
- Riegel in 2024
- Nationality: (Germany) German
- Born: 25 June 2004 (age 22) Hünxe, Germany

Lamborghini Super Trofeo Europe career
- Debut season: 2024
- Current team: Leipert Motorsport
- Categorisation: FIA Bronze (2021); FIA Silver (2022–)
- Car number: 70
- Starts: 12
- Wins: 0
- Podiums: 2
- Poles: 0
- Fastest laps: 0
- Best finish: 11th in 2024

Previous series
- 2023 2022: GT World Challenge Europe Endurance Cup; DTM Trophy

Jacob Riegel (born 25 June 2004 in Hünxe) is a German racing driver who last competed in Lamborghini Super Trofeo Asia for Leipert Motorsport. He previously raced in 2024 Lamborghini Super Trofeo Europe, GT World Challenge Europe Endurance Cup and DTM Trophy.

== Career ==
Towards the end of 2021 Riegel made his GT4 debut, racing in the final two rounds of that year's ADAC GT4 Germany season for Team Speed Monkeys. Riegel scored a best result of eighth in race two at Nürburgring but didn't score points as he was a guest driver.

In 2022, Riegel remained with Speed Monkeys to compete full-time in the final season of DTM Trophy. Following a scoreless round at Lausitzring, Riegel scored his first pole of his career at Imola and took his first podiums in the same round by finishing runner-up in both races. Riegel scored his third podium of the season at the Red Bull Ring by finishing third, and ended the season eighth in the standings.

During 2022, Riegel was nominated as one of 22 candidates for the Aston Martin Racing Drive Academy. One month later, Riegel returned to the ADAC GT4 Germany series, competing in the third round of the season at Zandvoort.

Stepping up to GT3 competition for 2023, Riegel joined Bullitt Racing in Asian Le Mans Series. Following his maiden outing at Dubai, where he suffered a technical issue in race one and a puncture in race two, Riegel scored his best finish of the season at Yas Marina by finishing 13th in the season finale.

Riegel remained with Bullitt Racing for the 2023 GT World Challenge Europe Endurance Cup. In the five-race season, Riegel scored a best result of 30th at Nürburgring and finished eighth in the Silver Cup standings at season's end.

In 2024, Riegel joined Leipert Motorsport to compete in the 2024 Lamborghini Super Trofeo Europe season alongside Sebastian Balthasar. On his series debut at Imola, Riegel scored his maiden podium by finishing second. Taking another podium at his home round at the Nürburgring, Riegel finished 11th in points in his only season in the series.

Remaining with Leipert for 2025, Riegel joined them for select races of the Lamborghini Super Trofeo Asia season, as well as the Lamborghini Super Trofeo World Finals. Riegel won on his series debut at Shanghai and scored one other podium to end the season tenth in the Pro standings.

== Personal life ==
Riegel is the son of Marc Riegel, who is the managing director of Riegel Interior.

== Racing record ==
=== Racing career summary ===
Season	Series	Team	Races	Wins	Poles	F/Laps	Podiums	Points	Position
2021	DMV BMW 318ti Cup	Smyrlis Racing	4	0	0	0	0	8	40th
2021	ADAC GT4 Germany	Team Speed Monkeys	4	0	0	0	0	0	NC†
2022	ADAC GT4 Germany	Team Speed Monkeys	2	0	0	0	0	0	46th
2022	DTM Trophy	Speed Monkeys	14	0	2	0	3	87	8th
2022	Nürburgring Langstrecken-Serie - M240i	Smyrlis Racing	1	0	0	0	0	0	NC
2023	Asian Le Mans Series - GT	Bullitt Racing	4	0	0	0	0	0	21st
2023	GT World Challenge Europe Endurance Cup	Bullitt Racing	5	0	0	0	0	0	NC
2023	GT World Challenge Europe Endurance Cup - Silver Cup	Bullitt Racing	5	0	0	0	0	38	8th
2023	Nürburgring Langstrecken-Serie - M240i	Smyrlis Racing	3	0	0	0	0	0	NC
2024	Lamborghini Super Trofeo Europe	Leipert Motorsport	12	0	0	0	2	34	11th
2024	24 Hours of Nürburgring - Cup2 AM	KKrämer Racing	1	0	0	0	1	N/A	**2nd**
2025	Lamborghini Super Trofeo Asia – Pro	Leipert Motorsport	4	1	1	0	2	22	10th
2025	Lamborghini Super Trofeo World Finals – Pro	Leipert Motorsport	2	0	0	0	0	3	13th

† As Riegel was a guest driver, he was ineligible for points.

=== Complete ADAC GT4 Germany results ===
(key) (Races in bold indicate pole position) (Races in italics indicate fastest lap)

Year	Team	Car	1	2	3	4	5	6	7	8	9	10	11	12	DC	Points
2021	Team Speed Monkeys	Porsche 718 Cayman GT4 Clubsport	OSC1; 1	OSC1; 2	RBR; 1	RBR; 2	ZAN; 1	ZAN; 2	SAC; 1	SAC; 2	HOC; 1; 20	HOC; 2; 12	NÜR; 1; 17	NÜR; 2; 8	NC†	0
2022	Speed Monkeys	Aston Martin Vantage AMR GT4	OSC; 1	OSC; 2	RBR; 1	RBR; 2	ZAN; 1; 20	ZAN; 2; 18	NÜR; 1	NÜR; 2	SAC; 1	SAC; 2	HOC; 1	HOC; 2	46th	0

† As Riegel was a guest driver, he was ineligible for points.

=== Complete Asian Le Mans Series results ===
(key) (Races in bold indicate pole position) (Races in italics indicate fastest lap)

Year	Team	Class	Car	Engine	1	2	3	4	Pos.	Points
2023	Bullitt Racing	GT	Aston Martin Vantage AMR GT3	Aston Martin 4.0 L Turbo V8	DUB; 1 Ret	DUB; 2; 17	ABU; 1 Ret	ABU; 2; 13	21st	0

=== Complete GT World Challenge results ===
==== GT World Challenge Europe Endurance Cup ====
(Races in bold indicate pole position) (Races in italics indicate fastest lap)

Year	Team	Car	Class	1	2	3	4	5	6	7	Pos.	Points
2023	Bullitt Racing	Aston Martin Vantage AMR GT3	Silver	MNZ; 40	LEC; Ret	SPA; 6H; 67	SPA; 12H; 51	SPA; 24H; 40	NÜR; 30	CAT; 39	8th	38
