= Tim Heinemann =

German racing driver

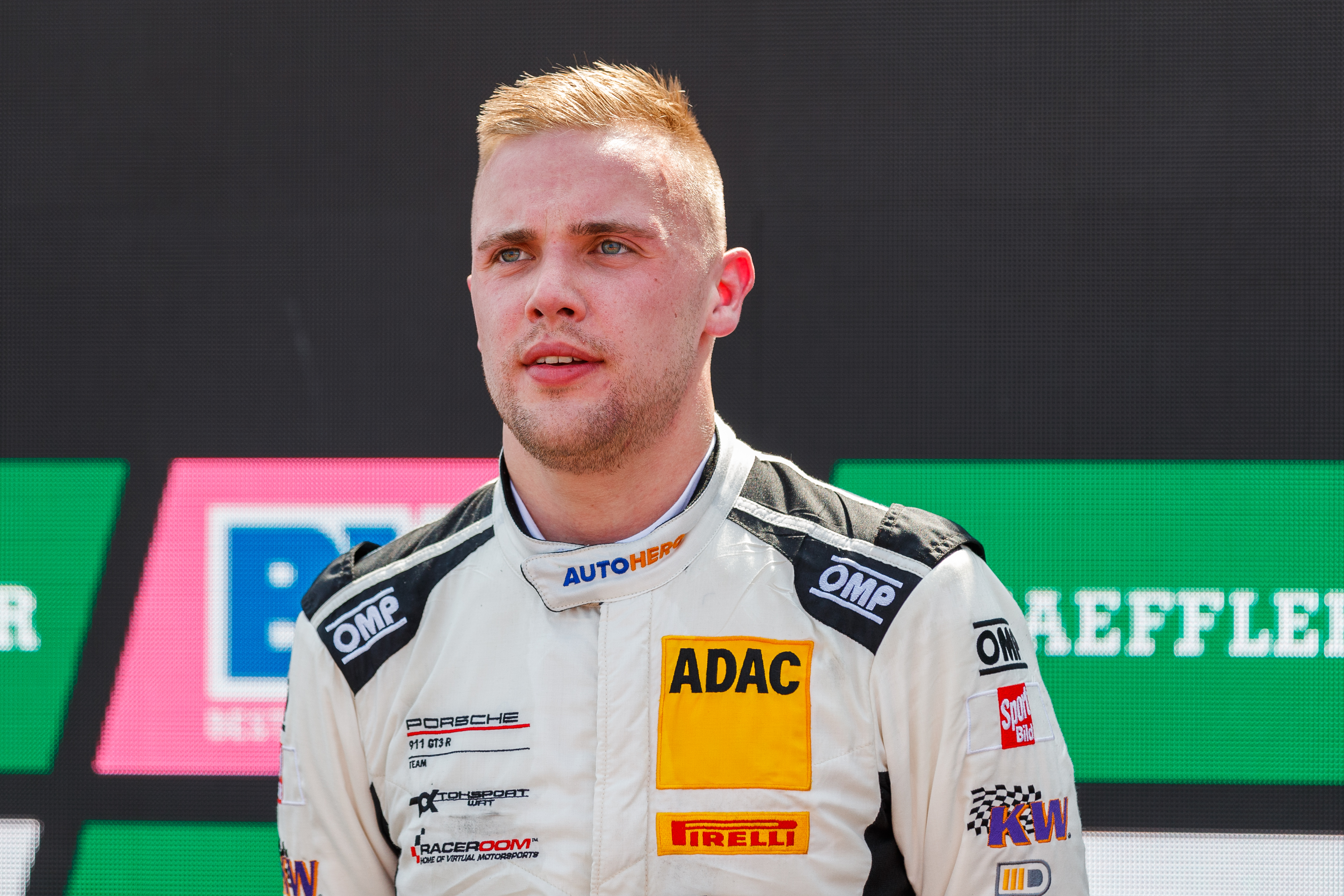
- Heinemann in 2023
- Nationality: (Germany) German
- Born: 23 October 1997 (age 29) Essen, North Rhine-Westphalia, Germany

DTM career
- Debut season: 2023
- Current team: Toksport WRT
- Categorisation: FIA Silver (until 2023); FIA Gold (2024–)
- Starts: 16 (16 entries)
- Wins: 0
- Podiums: 2
- Poles: 0
- Fastest laps: 0
- Best finish: 18th in 2023

Championship titles
- 2020, 2022: DTM Trophy

Awards
- 2021: Anerkennungspreis Bürgerstiftung Fichtenberg für herausragende sportliche Leistungen

Tim Heinemann (born 23 October 1997) is a German professional racing driver for Porsche. A former sim racer and two-time DTM Trophy champion, he competed in DTM in 2023, scoring a double podium on debut at Oschersleben. He has also raced in the NLS, Nürburgring 24 Hours and GT World Challenge Europe.

Parallel to his racing career, Heinemann works as an industrial clerk for KW Automotive.

== DTM career ==
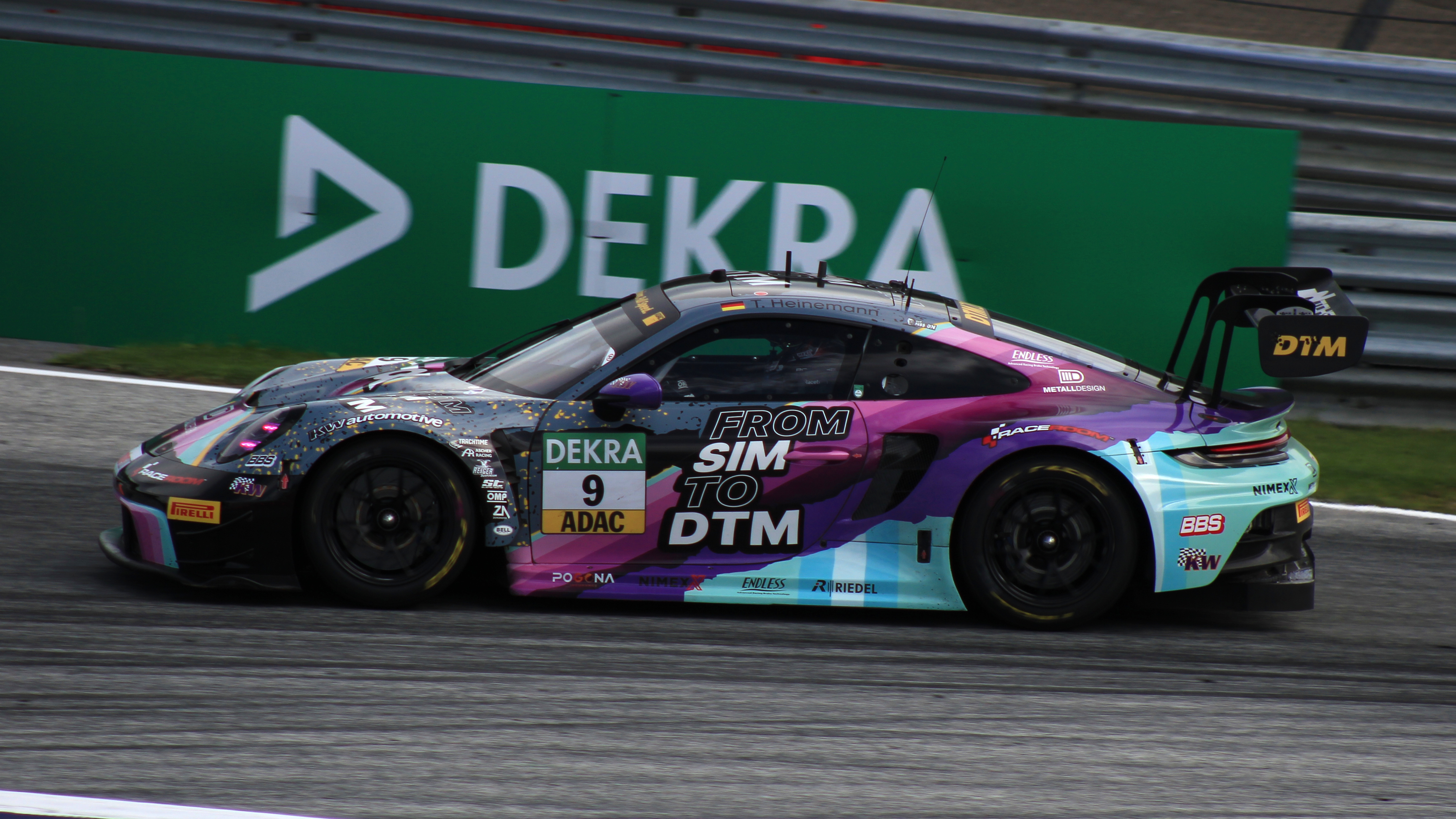
Heinemann's Porsche, with the inscription "From Sim to DTM", at the Red Bull Ring in 2023.

=== 2023 - Debut campaign ===
Heinemann graduated to the Deutsche Tourenwagen Masters in 2023, driving a Porsche 911 GT3 R (992) for Toksport WRT under the slogan From Sim to DTM, alongside former ADAC GT Masters champion Christian Engelhart. During the season opener at Oschersleben, Heinemann experienced an imposing weekend, finishing second in both races and taking the championship lead in the process.

== Racing Record ==
=== Career summary ===
Season	Series	Team	Races	Wins	Poles	F/Laps	Podiums	Points	Position
2019	ADAC GT4 Germany	HP Racing International	9	2	2	0	3	99	7th
2020	DTM Trophy	HP Racing International	12	7	5	4	11	275	**1st**
2021	DTM Trophy	PROsport Racing	7	0	2	1	2	60	10th
2021	ADAC GT Masters	PROsport Racing	2	0	0	0	0	0	NC†
2021	24 Hours of Nürburgring - Cup X	Team mcchip-dkr	1	0	0	0	1	N/A	**2nd**
2022	DTM Trophy	Toyota Gazoo Racing Germany powered by Ring Racing	14	6	4	3	8	235	**1st**
2022	24 Hours of Nürburgring - SP-X	KTM True Racing	1	0	0	0	0	N/A	DNF
2023	Deutsche Tourenwagen Masters	Toksport WRT	16	0	0	0	2	50	18th
2023	GT World Challenge Europe Endurance Cup	Huber Motorsport	1	0	1	1	0	0	NC
2023	GT World Challenge Europe Endurance Cup	Herberth Motorsport	1	0	0	0	0	0	NC
2023	GT World Challenge Europe Endurance Cup - Bronze Cup	Huber Motorsport	1	1	1	1	1	61	5th*
2023	GT World Challenge Europe Endurance Cup - Bronze Cup	Herberth Motorsport	1	1	0	0	1	61	5th*
2023	Intercontinental GT Challenge	Herberth Motorsport	1	0	0	0	0	10	24th
2023	24 Hours of Nürburgring - SP9	Falken Motorsports	1	0	0	0	0	N/A	10th
2023-24	Asian Le Mans Series - GT	Herberth Motorsport	3	0	0	0	0	8	23rd
2024	Nürburgring Langstrecken-Serie - SP9	Falken Motorsports	4	1	0	0	2	0	NC†
2024	Intercontinental GT Challenge	Falken Motorsports	1	0	0	0	0	6	21st
2024	24 Hours of Nürburgring - SP9	Falken Motorsports	1	0	0	0	0	N/A	10th
2025	Nürburgring Langstrecken-Serie - SP9	Falken Motorsports	4	0	0	0	2	0	NC
2025	GT World Challenge Europe Endurance Cup	Herberth Motorsport	5	0	0	0	0	0	NC
2025	Nürburgring Langstrecken-Serie - Cup2	Raceworxx Automotive	2	0	0	0	0	0	NC
2026	Nürburgring Langstrecken-Serie - SP9 Pro	Falken Motorsports	5	1	0	0	3	36	NC†
2026	24 Hours of Nürburgring - SP9	Falken Motorsports	1	0	0	0	0	N/A	DNF
2026	Nürburgring Langstrecken-Serie - SP9 Pro-Am	Up2Race	0	0	0	0	0	0	NC
2026	Nürburgring Langstrecken-Serie - Cup2	Up2Race	0	0	0	0	0	0	NC
2026	24H Series - GT3	Up2Race	2	1	0	1	2	96	9th
2026	GT World Challenge Europe Endurance Cup	JMW Motorsport	4	0	0	0	0	0	NC

^{†}Guest driver ineligible to score points

=== Complete ADAC GT Masters results ===
(key) (Races in bold indicate pole position) (Races in italics indicate fastest lap)

Year	Team	Car	1	2	3	4	5	6	7	8	9	10	11	12	13	14	Rank	Points
2021	PROsport Racing	Aston Martin Vantage AMR GT3	OSC; 1	OSC; 2	RBR; 1	RBR; 2	ZAN; 1	ZAN; 2	LAU; 1	LAU; 2	SAC; 1	SAC; 2	HOC; 1; 17	HOC; 2; 21	NÜR; 1	NÜR; 2	NC	0

=== Complete Deutsche Tourenwagen Masters results ===
(key) (Races in bold indicate pole position) (Races in italics indicate fastest lap)

Year	Entrant	Chassis	1	2	3	4	5	6	7	8	9	10	11	12	13	14	15	16	Rank	Points
2023	Toksport WRT	Porsche 911 GT3 R (992)	OSC; 1; 2	OSC; 2; 2^{2}	ZAN; 1; 19	ZAN; 2; 16	NOR; 1 Ret	NOR; 2; 16	NÜR; 1; 14	NÜR; 2; 12	LAU; 1 Ret	LAU; 2; 16	SAC; 1; 16	SAC; 2; 14	RBR; 1; 21	RBR; 2; 20	HOC; 1 Ret	HOC; 2 Ret	18th	50

=== Complete GT World Challenge Europe results ===
==== GT World Challenge Europe Endurance Cup ====
(key) (Races in bold indicate pole position) (Races in italics indicate fastest lap)

Year	Team	Car	Class	1	2	3	4	5	6	7	Pos.	Points
2023	Huber Motorsport	Porsche 911 GT3 R (992)	Bronze	MNZ	LEC	SPA; 6H; 27	SPA; 12H; 27	**SPA**; **24H**; 13			7th	61
2023	Herberth Motorsport	Porsche 911 GT3 R (992)	Bronze						NÜR; 19	CAT	7th	61
2025	Herberth Motorsport	Porsche 911 GT3 R (992)	Gold	LEC; 20	MNZ; Ret	SPA; 6H; 50	SPA; 12H; 31	**SPA**; **24H**; 51†	NÜR; 23		10th	30
2025	Herberth Motorsport	Porsche 911 GT3 R (992)	Bronze							CAT; Ret	NC	0
2026	JMW Motorsport	Ferrari 296 GT3 Evo	Bronze	LEC; Ret	MNZ; 22	SPA; 6H; 36	SPA; 12H; 55†	SPA; 24H; Ret			30th	9
2026	JMW Motorsport	Ferrari 296 GT3 Evo	Pro						NÜR; 30	ALG	NC	0

=== Complete Asian Le Mans Series results ===
(key) (Races in bold indicate pole position) (Races in italics indicate fastest lap)

Year	Team	Class	Car	Engine	1	2	3	4	5	Pos.	Points
2023–24	Herberth Motorsport	GT	Porsche 911 GT3 R (992)	Porsche 4.2 L Flat-6	SEP; 1 Ret	SEP; 2; 7	DUB; 9	ABU; 1	ABU; 2	23rd	8
