= Nikos Bozionelos =

Greek-British business psychologist

Nikos Bozionelos is a Greek-British academic in the area of Business Psychology. His early career contributions included a report on physical features and promotion rates of managers. Later contributions included establishment of the notion of prevalence rates for computer anxiety and demonstration of the digital divide.

His name is nowadays mostly associated with research in careers. As of 2023, he is a professor at Emlyon Business School, having previously been a professor at Durham Business School and Audencia Business School.

== Works ==
- Baruch, Y. & Bozionelos, N. 2010. Career Issues. In APA Handbook of Industrial and Organizational Psychology, v. 2: Selecting & Developing Members of the Organization. Zedeck, S. Washington DC: American Psychological Association. 67–113.|
- Bozionelos, N. 2004. Socio-economic background and computer use The role of computer anxiety and computer experience in their relationship. International Journal of Human-Computer Studies 61: 725–746.|
- Bozionelos, N. 2004. The relationship between disposition and career success A British study. Journal of Occupational and Organizational Psychology 77(3): 403–420.|
