= 2025 GT World Challenge Europe Endurance Cup =

Motorsports event

The 2025 GT World Challenge Europe Endurance Cup was the fifteenth season of the GT World Challenge Europe Endurance Cup since its inception in 2011 as the Blancpain Endurance Series. The season began on 13 April at Circuit Paul Ricard and finished on 12 October at Circuit de Barcelona-Catalunya.

== Calendar ==
The provisional calendar was released on July 28, 2024, at the SRO's annual 24 Hours of Spa press conference, featuring five rounds.

Round	Race	Circuit	Date	Map
1	6 Hours of Paul Ricard	Circuit Paul Ricard, Le Castellet, France	11–13 April	2025 GT World Challenge Europe Endurance Cup is located in Europe
2	3 Hours of Monza	Autodromo Nazionale Monza, Monza, Italy	30 May–1 June	2025 GT World Challenge Europe Endurance Cup is located in Europe
3	CrowdStrike 24 Hours of Spa	Circuit de Spa-Francorchamps, Stavelot, Belgium	26–29 June	2025 GT World Challenge Europe Endurance Cup is located in Europe
4	3 Hours of Nürburgring	Nürburgring, Nürburg, Germany	29–31 August	2025 GT World Challenge Europe Endurance Cup is located in Europe
5	3 Hours of Barcelona	Circuit de Barcelona-Catalunya, Montmeló, Spain	10–12 October	2025 GT World Challenge Europe Endurance Cup is located in Europe

== Entry list ==
Team	Car	No.	Drivers	Class	Rounds
(Japan) Goodsmile Racing	Mercedes-AMG GT3 Evo	00	(Japan) Tatsuya Kataoka	P	3
(Japan) Goodsmile Racing	Mercedes-AMG GT3 Evo	00	(Japan) Kamui Kobayashi	P	3
(Japan) Goodsmile Racing	Mercedes-AMG GT3 Evo	00	(Japan) Nobuteru Taniguchi	P	3
(Malaysia) Johor Motorsports JMR	Chevrolet Corvette Z06 GT3.R	2	(Malaysia) Prince Abu Bakar Ibrahim	B	3
(Malaysia) Johor Motorsports JMR	Chevrolet Corvette Z06 GT3.R	2	(Malaysia) Prince Jefri Ibrahim	B	3
(Malaysia) Johor Motorsports JMR	Chevrolet Corvette Z06 GT3.R	2	(Australia) Jordan Love	B	3
(Malaysia) Johor Motorsports JMR	Chevrolet Corvette Z06 GT3.R	2	(United Kingdom) Alexander Sims	B	3
(Germany) GetSpeed	Mercedes-AMG GT3 Evo	3	(United States) Anthony Bartone	S	All
(Germany) GetSpeed	Mercedes-AMG GT3 Evo	3	(Poland) Karol Basz	S	All
(Germany) GetSpeed	Mercedes-AMG GT3 Evo	3	(Switzerland) Yannick Mettler	S	All
(Germany) GetSpeed	Mercedes-AMG GT3 Evo	3	(Germany) Tom Kalender	S	3
(Germany) GetSpeed	Mercedes-AMG GT3 Evo	6	(Thailand) Tanart Sathienthirakul	S	All
(Germany) GetSpeed	Mercedes-AMG GT3 Evo	6	(United Kingdom) Aaron Walker	S	All
(Germany) GetSpeed	Mercedes-AMG GT3 Evo	6	(Netherlands) Colin Caresani	S	1–3
(Germany) GetSpeed	Mercedes-AMG GT3 Evo	6	(Netherlands) Lin Hodenius	S	3–4
(Germany) GetSpeed	Mercedes-AMG GT3 Evo	6	(Germany) Tom Kalender	S	5
(Germany) Mercedes-AMG Team GetSpeed	Mercedes-AMG GT3 Evo	17	(Andorra) Jules Gounon	P	All
(Germany) Mercedes-AMG Team GetSpeed	Mercedes-AMG GT3 Evo	17	(Germany) Fabian Schiller	P	All
(Germany) Mercedes-AMG Team GetSpeed	Mercedes-AMG GT3 Evo	17	(Germany) Luca Stolz	P	All
(United States) CrowdStrike by SPS	Mercedes-AMG GT3 Evo	4	(United States) Colin Braun	PA	3
(United States) CrowdStrike by SPS	Mercedes-AMG GT3 Evo	4	(Netherlands) Nicky Catsburg	PA	3
(United States) CrowdStrike by SPS	Mercedes-AMG GT3 Evo	4	(United Kingdom) Ian James	PA	3
(United States) CrowdStrike by SPS	Mercedes-AMG GT3 Evo	4	(United States) George Kurtz	PA	3
(United Kingdom) Optimum Motorsport	McLaren 720S GT3 Evo	5	(Denmark) Largim Ali	G	All
(United Kingdom) Optimum Motorsport	McLaren 720S GT3 Evo	5	(Australia) James Allen	G	All
(United Kingdom) Optimum Motorsport	McLaren 720S GT3 Evo	5	(United Kingdom) Mikey Porter	G	All
(United Kingdom) Optimum Motorsport	McLaren 720S GT3 Evo	5	(United Kingdom) Ollie Millroy	G	3
(Belgium) Comtoyou Racing	Aston Martin Vantage AMR GT3 Evo	7	(Italy) Mattia Drudi	P	All
(Belgium) Comtoyou Racing	Aston Martin Vantage AMR GT3 Evo	7	(Denmark) Marco Sørensen	P	All
(Belgium) Comtoyou Racing	Aston Martin Vantage AMR GT3 Evo	7	(Denmark) Nicki Thiim	P	All
(Belgium) Comtoyou Racing	Aston Martin Vantage AMR GT3 Evo	11	(Mexico) Sebastián Álvarez	PA	3
(Belgium) Comtoyou Racing	Aston Martin Vantage AMR GT3 Evo	11	(France) Frédéric Jousset	PA	3
(Belgium) Comtoyou Racing	Aston Martin Vantage AMR GT3 Evo	11	(Brazil) Sérgio Sette Câmara	PA	3
(Belgium) Comtoyou Racing	Aston Martin Vantage AMR GT3 Evo	11	(Portugal) Bernardo Sousa	PA	3
(Belgium) Comtoyou Racing	Aston Martin Vantage AMR GT3 Evo	21	(Belgium) Nicolas Baert	S	All
(Belgium) Comtoyou Racing	Aston Martin Vantage AMR GT3 Evo	21	(United Arab Emirates) Jamie Day	S	All
(Belgium) Comtoyou Racing	Aston Martin Vantage AMR GT3 Evo	21	(Belgium) Kobe Pauwels	S	All
(Belgium) Comtoyou Racing	Aston Martin Vantage AMR GT3 Evo	21	(Netherlands) Xavier Maassen	S	3
(Belgium) Comtoyou Racing	Aston Martin Vantage AMR GT3 Evo	270	(United Kingdom) Jessica Hawkins	B	All
(Belgium) Comtoyou Racing	Aston Martin Vantage AMR GT3 Evo	270	(Belgium) Alexandre Leroy	B	All
(Belgium) Comtoyou Racing	Aston Martin Vantage AMR GT3 Evo	270	(Belgium) Antoine Potty	B	All
(Belgium) Comtoyou Racing	Aston Martin Vantage AMR GT3 Evo	270	(Mozambique) Rodrigo Almeida	B	3
(Switzerland) Kessel Racing	Ferrari 296 GT3	8	(Italy) David Fumanelli	B	All
(Switzerland) Kessel Racing	Ferrari 296 GT3	8	(Switzerland) Nicolò Rosi	B	All
(Switzerland) Kessel Racing	Ferrari 296 GT3	8	(Italy) Niccolò Schirò	B	All
(Switzerland) Kessel Racing	Ferrari 296 GT3	8	(Italy) Daniele Di Amato	B	3
(Switzerland) Kessel Racing	Ferrari 296 GT3	74	(United States) Dustin Blattner	B	All
(Switzerland) Kessel Racing	Ferrari 296 GT3	74	(Denmark) Conrad Laursen	B	All
(Switzerland) Kessel Racing	Ferrari 296 GT3	74	(Germany) Dennis Marschall	B	All
(Switzerland) Kessel Racing	Ferrari 296 GT3	74	(Canada) Zacharie Robichon	B	3
(Belgium) Boutsen VDS	Mercedes-AMG GT3 Evo	9	(Germany) Maximilian Götz	P	All
(Belgium) Boutsen VDS	Mercedes-AMG GT3 Evo	9	(Canada) Mikaël Grenier	P	All
(Belgium) Boutsen VDS	Mercedes-AMG GT3 Evo	9	(Belgium) Maxime Martin	P	All
(Belgium) Boutsen VDS	Mercedes-AMG GT3 Evo	10	(France) Loris Cabirou	S	All
(Belgium) Boutsen VDS	Mercedes-AMG GT3 Evo	10	(France) César Gazeau	S	All
(Belgium) Boutsen VDS	Mercedes-AMG GT3 Evo	10	(France) Aurélien Panis	S	All
(Belgium) Boutsen VDS	Mercedes-AMG GT3 Evo	10	(United Kingdom) Hugo Cook	S	3
(Germany) Rinaldi Racing	Ferrari 296 GT3	12	(Germany) Christian Hook	B	1–3
(Germany) Rinaldi Racing	Ferrari 296 GT3	12	(South Africa) David Perel	B	1–3
(Germany) Rinaldi Racing	Ferrari 296 GT3	12	(Italy) Davide Rigon	B	1–3
(Germany) Rinaldi Racing	Ferrari 296 GT3	12	(Germany) Felipe Fernández Laser	B	3
(Germany) Rinaldi Racing	Ferrari 296 GT3	12	(Italy) Fabrizio Crestani	S	4–5
(Germany) Rinaldi Racing	Ferrari 296 GT3	12	(Spain) Rafael Durán	S	4–5
(Germany) Rinaldi Racing	Ferrari 296 GT3	12	(South Africa) David Perel	S	4–5
(Italy) BMW Italia Ceccato Racing	BMW M4 GT3 Evo	15	(Italy) Felice Jelmini	B	All
(Italy) BMW Italia Ceccato Racing	BMW M4 GT3 Evo	15	(Italy) Federico Malvestiti	B	All
(Italy) BMW Italia Ceccato Racing	BMW M4 GT3 Evo	15	(Brazil) Marcelo Tomasoni	B	All
(Italy) BMW Italia Ceccato Racing	BMW M4 GT3 Evo	15	(United States) Connor De Phillippi	B	3
(Italy) Dinamic GT	Porsche 911 GT3 R (992)	18	(Denmark) Bastian Buus	P	3
(Italy) Dinamic GT	Porsche 911 GT3 R (992)	18	(Australia) Matt Campbell	P	3
(Italy) Dinamic GT	Porsche 911 GT3 R (992)	18	(France) Mathieu Jaminet	P	3
(Italy) Dinamic GT	Porsche 911 GT3 R (992)	54	(United Arab Emirates) Federico Al Rifai	S	All
(Italy) Dinamic GT	Porsche 911 GT3 R (992)	54	(Netherlands) Jop Rappange	S	All
(Italy) Dinamic GT	Porsche 911 GT3 R (992)	54	(Guatemala) Mateo Llarena	S	1
(Italy) Dinamic GT	Porsche 911 GT3 R (992)	54	(Denmark) Mikkel O. Pedersen	S	2, 4–5
(Italy) Dinamic GT	Porsche 911 GT3 R (992)	54	(France) Sébastien Baud	S	3
(Italy) Dinamic GT	Porsche 911 GT3 R (992)	54	(Sri Lanka) Eshan Pieris	S	3
(Italy) UNX Racing	Porsche 911 GT3 R (992)	888	(Belgium) Mathieu Detry	B	4–5
(Italy) UNX Racing	Porsche 911 GT3 R (992)	888	(Belgium) Fabian Duffieux	B	4–5
(Italy) UNX Racing	Porsche 911 GT3 R (992)	888	(Denmark) Bastian Buus	B	5
(Austria) GRT - Grasser Racing Team	Lamborghini Huracán GT3 Evo 2	19	(Netherlands) Dante Rappange	S	All
(Austria) GRT - Grasser Racing Team	Lamborghini Huracán GT3 Evo 2	19	Ivan Ekelchik (Note: Ekelchik, Mukovoz, Nesov and Salikhov are Russian, but they compete as neutral competitors as Russian national emblems were banned by the FIA following the Russian invasion of Ukraine. Petrov, also a Russian, competes under an Israeli licence for the same reason.)	S	1–4
(Austria) GRT - Grasser Racing Team	Lamborghini Huracán GT3 Evo 2	19	(Belgium) Baptiste Moulin	S	1–4
(Austria) GRT - Grasser Racing Team	Lamborghini Huracán GT3 Evo 2	19	(China) Liang Jiatong	S	3
(Austria) GRT - Grasser Racing Team	Lamborghini Huracán GT3 Evo 2	19	(Spain) Isaac Tutumlu	S	5
(Austria) GRT - Grasser Racing Team	Lamborghini Huracán GT3 Evo 2	19	(Austria) Gerhard Tweraser	S	5
(Austria) GRT - Grasser Racing Team	Lamborghini Huracán GT3 Evo 2	63	(Italy) Mirko Bortolotti	P	All
(Austria) GRT - Grasser Racing Team	Lamborghini Huracán GT3 Evo 2	63	(Germany) Luca Engstler	P	All
(Austria) GRT - Grasser Racing Team	Lamborghini Huracán GT3 Evo 2	63	(South Africa) Jordan Pepper	P	All
(France) Schumacher CLRT	Porsche 911 GT3 R (992)	22	(Turkey) Ayhancan Güven	P	All
(France) Schumacher CLRT	Porsche 911 GT3 R (992)	22	(Austria) Klaus Bachler	P	1, 3–4
(France) Schumacher CLRT	Porsche 911 GT3 R (992)	22	(Germany) Laurin Heinrich	P	1, 3–4
(France) Schumacher CLRT	Porsche 911 GT3 R (992)	22	(Netherlands) Larry ten Voorde	P	2, 5
(France) Schumacher CLRT	Porsche 911 GT3 R (992)	22	(Netherlands) Morris Schuring	P	2
(France) Schumacher CLRT	Porsche 911 GT3 R (992)	22	(France) Alessandro Ghiretti	P	5
(United Kingdom) Team RJN	McLaren 720S GT3 Evo	23	(Republic of Ireland) Reece Barr	G	All
(United Kingdom) Team RJN	McLaren 720S GT3 Evo	23	(United Kingdom) Alex Buncombe	G	All
(United Kingdom) Team RJN	McLaren 720S GT3 Evo	23	(United Kingdom) Tommy Foster	G	All
(United Kingdom) Team RJN	McLaren 720S GT3 Evo	23	(Germany) Ben Dörr	G	3
(United Kingdom) Steller Motorsport	Chevrolet Corvette Z06 GT3.R	24	(United Kingdom) Lorcan Hanafin	S	All
(United Kingdom) Steller Motorsport	Chevrolet Corvette Z06 GT3.R	24	(Belgium) Matisse Lismont	S	1–3
(United Kingdom) Steller Motorsport	Chevrolet Corvette Z06 GT3.R	24	(United Kingdom) Kiern Jewiss	S	1
(United Kingdom) Steller Motorsport	Chevrolet Corvette Z06 GT3.R	24	(Canada) Daniel Ali	S	2–5
(United Kingdom) Steller Motorsport	Chevrolet Corvette Z06 GT3.R	24	(Netherlands) Olivier Hart	S	3
(United Kingdom) Steller Motorsport	Chevrolet Corvette Z06 GT3.R	24	(United States) Alec Udell	S	4
(United Kingdom) Steller Motorsport	Chevrolet Corvette Z06 GT3.R	24	(Canada) Adam Ali	S	5
(France) Saintéloc Racing	Audi R8 LMS Evo II	25	(France) Paul Evrard	B	All
(France) Saintéloc Racing	Audi R8 LMS Evo II	25	(Belgium) Gilles Magnus	B	All
(France) Saintéloc Racing	Audi R8 LMS Evo II	25	(France) Benjamin Ricci	B	All
(France) Saintéloc Racing	Audi R8 LMS Evo II	25	(United States) Reece Gold	B	3
(France) Saintéloc Racing	Audi R8 LMS Evo II	26	(Ukraine) Ivan Klymenko	S	All
(France) Saintéloc Racing	Audi R8 LMS Evo II	26	(Belgium) Lorens Lecertua	S	All
(France) Saintéloc Racing	Audi R8 LMS Evo II	26	(Switzerland) Lucas Légeret	S	1
(France) Saintéloc Racing	Audi R8 LMS Evo II	26	(United States) Reece Gold	S	2, 4–5
(France) Saintéloc Racing	Audi R8 LMS Evo II	26	(United States) Wyatt Brichacek	S	3
(France) Saintéloc Racing	Audi R8 LMS Evo II	26	(Belgium) Lorenzo Donniacuo	S	3
(Qatar) QMMF by Saintéloc Racing	Audi R8 LMS Evo II	27	(Qatar) Abdulla Ali Al-Khelaifi	B	All
(Qatar) QMMF by Saintéloc Racing	Audi R8 LMS Evo II	27	(Qatar) Ghanim Salah Al-Maadheed	B	All
(Qatar) QMMF by Saintéloc Racing	Audi R8 LMS Evo II	27	(Qatar) Ibrahim Al-Abdulghani	B	1–4
(Qatar) QMMF by Saintéloc Racing	Audi R8 LMS Evo II	27	(Germany) Julian Hanses	B	3, 5
(Antigua and Barbuda) HAAS RT	Audi R8 LMS Evo II	28	(Belgium) Simon Balcaen	PA	3
(Antigua and Barbuda) HAAS RT	Audi R8 LMS Evo II	28	(Belgium) Xavier Knauf	PA	3
(Antigua and Barbuda) HAAS RT	Audi R8 LMS Evo II	28	(France) Steven Palette	PA	3
(Antigua and Barbuda) HAAS RT	Audi R8 LMS Evo II	28	(Belgium) Grégory Servais	PA	3
(France) AV Racing by Car Collection Motorsport	Porsche 911 GT3 R (992)	29	(France) Noam Abramczyk	PA	3
(France) AV Racing by Car Collection Motorsport	Porsche 911 GT3 R (992)	29	(Belgium) Mathieu Detry	PA	3
(France) AV Racing by Car Collection Motorsport	Porsche 911 GT3 R (992)	29	(Belgium) Fabian Duffieux	PA	3
(France) AV Racing by Car Collection Motorsport	Porsche 911 GT3 R (992)	29	(China) Bo Yuan	PA	3
(Belgium) Team WRT	BMW M4 GT3 Evo	30	(France) Étienne Cheli	S	All
(Belgium) Team WRT	BMW M4 GT3 Evo	30	(Belgium) Gilles Stadsbader	S	All
(Belgium) Team WRT	BMW M4 GT3 Evo	30	(Sweden) Gustav Bergström	S	1–3
(Belgium) Team WRT	BMW M4 GT3 Evo	30	(France) Pierre-Louis Chovet	S	3
(Belgium) Team WRT	BMW M4 GT3 Evo	30	(Belgium) Matisse Lismont	S	4–5
(Belgium) Team WRT	BMW M4 GT3 Evo	31	(South Africa) Sheldon van der Linde	P	3
(Belgium) Team WRT	BMW M4 GT3 Evo	31	(Belgium) Dries Vanthoor	P	3
(Belgium) Team WRT	BMW M4 GT3 Evo	31	(Germany) Marco Wittmann	P	3
(Belgium) Team WRT	BMW M4 GT3 Evo	32	(Belgium) Ugo de Wilde	P	All
(Belgium) Team WRT	BMW M4 GT3 Evo	32	(South Africa) Kelvin van der Linde	P	All
(Belgium) Team WRT	BMW M4 GT3 Evo	32	(Belgium) Charles Weerts	P	All
(Belgium) Team WRT	BMW M4 GT3 Evo	46	(Denmark) Kevin Magnussen	P	3
(Belgium) Team WRT	BMW M4 GT3 Evo	46	(Germany) René Rast	P	3
(Belgium) Team WRT	BMW M4 GT3 Evo	46	(Italy) Valentino Rossi	P	3
(Oman) AlManar Racing by WRT	BMW M4 GT3 Evo	777	(Oman) Al Faisal Al Zubair	G	All
(Oman) AlManar Racing by WRT	BMW M4 GT3 Evo	777	(Germany) Jens Klingmann	G	All
(Oman) AlManar Racing by WRT	BMW M4 GT3 Evo	777	(United Kingdom) Ben Tuck	G	All
(Oman) AlManar Racing by WRT	BMW M4 GT3 Evo	777	(United States) Neil Verhagen	G	3
(Netherlands) Verstappen.com Racing (Note: Car No. 33 entered as Verstappen.com Racing. Car No. 222 entered as 2 Seas Motorsport.) (Bahrain) 2 Seas Motorsport	Aston Martin Vantage AMR GT3 Evo	33	(United Kingdom) Harry King	G	All
(Netherlands) Verstappen.com Racing (Bahrain) 2 Seas Motorsport	Aston Martin Vantage AMR GT3 Evo	33	(United Kingdom) Chris Lulham	G	All
(Netherlands) Verstappen.com Racing (Bahrain) 2 Seas Motorsport	Aston Martin Vantage AMR GT3 Evo	33	(Netherlands) Thierry Vermeulen	G	All
(Netherlands) Verstappen.com Racing (Bahrain) 2 Seas Motorsport	Mercedes-AMG GT3 Evo	222	(United Kingdom) Charles Dawson	B	3–5
(Netherlands) Verstappen.com Racing (Bahrain) 2 Seas Motorsport	Mercedes-AMG GT3 Evo	222	(United Kingdom) Kiern Jewiss	B	3, 5
(Netherlands) Verstappen.com Racing (Bahrain) 2 Seas Motorsport	Mercedes-AMG GT3 Evo	222	(Canada) Parker Thompson	B	3
(Netherlands) Verstappen.com Racing (Bahrain) 2 Seas Motorsport	Mercedes-AMG GT3 Evo	222	(United Kingdom) Lewis Williamson	B	3
(Netherlands) Verstappen.com Racing (Bahrain) 2 Seas Motorsport	Mercedes-AMG GT3 Evo	222	(United Kingdom) Ben Barnicoat	B	4
(Netherlands) Verstappen.com Racing (Bahrain) 2 Seas Motorsport	Mercedes-AMG GT3 Evo	222	(United Kingdom) Tom Lebbon	B	4–5
(Germany) Walkenhorst Motorsport	Aston Martin Vantage AMR GT3 Evo	34	(Portugal) Henrique Chaves	P	All
(Germany) Walkenhorst Motorsport	Aston Martin Vantage AMR GT3 Evo	34	(Norway) Christian Krognes	P	All
(Germany) Walkenhorst Motorsport	Aston Martin Vantage AMR GT3 Evo	34	(United Kingdom) David Pittard	P	All
(Germany) Walkenhorst Motorsport	Aston Martin Vantage AMR GT3 Evo	35	(France) Romain Leroux	S	All
(Germany) Walkenhorst Motorsport	Aston Martin Vantage AMR GT3 Evo	35	(Sweden) Oliver Söderström	S	All
(Germany) Walkenhorst Motorsport	Aston Martin Vantage AMR GT3 Evo	35	(Ecuador) Mateo Villagómez	S	All
(United Kingdom) Century Motorsport	BMW M4 GT3 Evo	42	(Netherlands) Mex Jansen	S	All
(United Kingdom) Century Motorsport	BMW M4 GT3 Evo	42	(United Kingdom) Will Moore	S	All
(United Kingdom) Century Motorsport	BMW M4 GT3 Evo	42	(South Africa) Jarrod Waberski	S	All
(United States) Mercedes-AMG Team Mann-Filter	Mercedes-AMG GT3 Evo	48	(Austria) Lucas Auer	P	All
(United States) Mercedes-AMG Team Mann-Filter	Mercedes-AMG GT3 Evo	48	(Italy) Matteo Cairoli	P	All
(United States) Mercedes-AMG Team Mann-Filter	Mercedes-AMG GT3 Evo	48	(Germany) Maro Engel	P	All
(United States) Winward Racing	Mercedes-AMG GT3 Evo	57	(Netherlands) Indy Dontje	G	3
(United States) Winward Racing	Mercedes-AMG GT3 Evo	57	(Switzerland) Philip Ellis	G	3
(United States) Winward Racing	Mercedes-AMG GT3 Evo	57	(United States) Russell Ward	G	3
(United States) Winward Racing	Mercedes-AMG GT3 Evo	81	(Germany) Marvin Dienst	B	All
(United States) Winward Racing	Mercedes-AMG GT3 Evo	81	(Italy) Gabriele Piana	B	All
(United States) Winward Racing	Mercedes-AMG GT3 Evo	81	Rinat Salikhov	B	All
(United States) Winward Racing	Mercedes-AMG GT3 Evo	81	(Netherlands) "Daan Arrow"	B	3
(Italy) AF Corse - Francorchamps Motors	Ferrari 296 GT3	50	(Italy) Eliseo Donno	P	All
(Italy) AF Corse - Francorchamps Motors	Ferrari 296 GT3	50	(Italy) Antonio Fuoco	P	All
(Italy) AF Corse - Francorchamps Motors	Ferrari 296 GT3	50	(Monaco) Arthur Leclerc	P	All
(Italy) AF Corse - Francorchamps Motors	Ferrari 296 GT3	51	(Monaco) Vincent Abril	P	All
(Italy) AF Corse - Francorchamps Motors	Ferrari 296 GT3	51	(Italy) Alessio Rovera	P	All
(Italy) AF Corse - Francorchamps Motors	Ferrari 296 GT3	51	(Italy) Alessandro Pier Guidi	P	1–4
(Italy) AF Corse - Francorchamps Motors	Ferrari 296 GT3	51	(China) Yifei Ye	P	5
(Italy) AF Corse - Francorchamps Motors	Ferrari 296 GT3	52	(Belgium) Jef Machiels	B	All
(Italy) AF Corse - Francorchamps Motors	Ferrari 296 GT3	52	(Belgium) Louis Machiels	B	All
(Italy) AF Corse - Francorchamps Motors	Ferrari 296 GT3	52	(Italy) Andrea Bertolini	B	1–2
(Italy) AF Corse - Francorchamps Motors	Ferrari 296 GT3	52	(Italy) Tommaso Mosca	B	3–5
(Italy) AF Corse - Francorchamps Motors	Ferrari 296 GT3	52	(Argentina) Marcos Siebert	B	3
(Italy) AF Corse	Ferrari 296 GT3	70	(Italy) Riccardo Agostini	PA	3
(Italy) AF Corse	Ferrari 296 GT3	70	(United Kingdom) Matt Bell	PA	3
(Italy) AF Corse	Ferrari 296 GT3	70	(United States) Blake McDonald	PA	3
(Italy) AF Corse	Ferrari 296 GT3	70	(Brazil) Custodio Toledo	PA	3
(Italy) AF Corse	Ferrari 296 GT3	71	(Belgium) Stéphane Lémeret	PA	3
(Italy) AF Corse	Ferrari 296 GT3	71	(Spain) Miguel Molina	PA	3
(Italy) AF Corse	Ferrari 296 GT3	71	(Argentina) Luis Pérez Companc	PA	3
(Italy) AF Corse	Ferrari 296 GT3	71	(Argentina) Matías Pérez Companc	PA	3
(United Kingdom) Ziggo Sport – Tempesta	Ferrari 296 GT3	93	(Italy) Eddie Cheever III	B	All
(United Kingdom) Ziggo Sport – Tempesta	Ferrari 296 GT3	93	(United Kingdom) Chris Froggatt	B	1–3, 5
(United Kingdom) Ziggo Sport – Tempesta	Ferrari 296 GT3	93	(Italy) Marco Pulcini	B	1, 4–5
(United Kingdom) Ziggo Sport – Tempesta	Ferrari 296 GT3	93	(Hong Kong) Jonathan Hui	B	2–3
(United Kingdom) Ziggo Sport – Tempesta	Ferrari 296 GT3	93	(Italy) Lorenzo Patrese	B	3–4
(United Kingdom) Garage 59	McLaren 720S GT3 Evo	58	(United Kingdom) Dean MacDonald	G	All
(United Kingdom) Garage 59	McLaren 720S GT3 Evo	58	(Monaco) Louis Prette	G	All
(United Kingdom) Garage 59	McLaren 720S GT3 Evo	58	(United Kingdom) Adam Smalley	G	All
(United Kingdom) Garage 59	McLaren 720S GT3 Evo	58	(Denmark) Frederik Schandorff	G	3
(United Kingdom) Garage 59	McLaren 720S GT3 Evo	59	(Germany) Benjamin Goethe	P	All
(United Kingdom) Garage 59	McLaren 720S GT3 Evo	59	(Germany) Marvin Kirchhöfer	P	All
(United Kingdom) Garage 59	McLaren 720S GT3 Evo	59	(United Kingdom) Joseph Loake	P	All
(United Kingdom) Garage 59	McLaren 720S GT3 Evo	188	(United Kingdom) Tom Fleming	B	1–3
(United Kingdom) Garage 59	McLaren 720S GT3 Evo	188	(Portugal) Guilherme Oliveira	B	1–3
(United Kingdom) Garage 59	McLaren 720S GT3 Evo	188	(Portugal) Miguel Ramos	B	1–2
(United Kingdom) Garage 59	McLaren 720S GT3 Evo	188	(United Kingdom) Shaun Balfe	B	3
(United Kingdom) Garage 59	McLaren 720S GT3 Evo	188	(United Kingdom) Jack Hawksworth	B	3
(United Kingdom) Garage 59	McLaren 720S GT3 Evo	188	(United Kingdom) James Baldwin	S	4–5
(United Kingdom) Garage 59	McLaren 720S GT3 Evo	188	(United Kingdom) Tom Fleming	S	4–5
(United Kingdom) Garage 59	McLaren 720S GT3 Evo	188	(Portugal) Guilherme Oliveira	S	4–5
(Italy) VSR	Lamborghini Huracán GT3 Evo 2	60	(Italy) Michele Beretta	S	All
(Italy) VSR	Lamborghini Huracán GT3 Evo 2	60	(Italy) Alessio Deledda	S	All
(Italy) VSR	Lamborghini Huracán GT3 Evo 2	60	(United Kingdom) Finlay Hutchison	S	1
(Italy) VSR	Lamborghini Huracán GT3 Evo 2	60	(Italy) Andrea Frassineti	S	2–3
(Italy) VSR	Lamborghini Huracán GT3 Evo 2	60	(Italy) Mattia Michelotto	S	3, 5
(Italy) VSR	Lamborghini Huracán GT3 Evo 2	60	(Israel) Artem Petrov	S	4
(Italy) VSR	Lamborghini Huracán GT3 Evo 2	163	(United Kingdom) Sandy Mitchell	P	All
(Italy) VSR	Lamborghini Huracán GT3 Evo 2	163	(France) Franck Perera	P	All
(Italy) VSR	Lamborghini Huracán GT3 Evo 2	163	(Italy) Marco Mapelli	P	1, 3–4
(Italy) VSR	Lamborghini Huracán GT3 Evo 2	163	(Italy) Mattia Michelotto	P	2
(Italy) VSR	Lamborghini Huracán GT3 Evo 2	163	(Italy) Loris Spinelli	P	5
(Germany) HRT Ford Performance	Ford Mustang GT3	64	(France) Thomas Drouet	P	All
(Germany) HRT Ford Performance	Ford Mustang GT3	64	(India) Arjun Maini	P	All
(Germany) HRT Ford Performance	Ford Mustang GT3	64	(United Kingdom) Jann Mardenborough	P	All
(Germany) HRT Ford Performance	Ford Mustang GT3	65	(France) Romain Andriolo	S	All
(Germany) HRT Ford Performance	Ford Mustang GT3	65	(Germany) David Schumacher	S	All
(Germany) HRT Ford Performance	Ford Mustang GT3	65	(Germany) Finn Wiebelhaus	S	All
(Germany) HRT Ford Performance	Ford Mustang GT3	65	(Germany) Salman Owega	S	3
(Italy) Tresor Attempto Racing	Audi R8 LMS Evo II	66	(Austria) Max Hofer	B	All
(Italy) Tresor Attempto Racing	Audi R8 LMS Evo II	66	Andrey Mukovoz	B	All
(Italy) Tresor Attempto Racing	Audi R8 LMS Evo II	66	Alexey Nesov	B	All
(Italy) Tresor Attempto Racing	Audi R8 LMS Evo II	66	(Luxembourg) Dylan Pereira	B	3
(Italy) Tresor Attempto Racing	Audi R8 LMS Evo II	88	(Italy) Riccardo Cazzaniga	G	All
(Italy) Tresor Attempto Racing	Audi R8 LMS Evo II	88	(Denmark) Sebastian Øgaard	G	1–4
(Italy) Tresor Attempto Racing	Audi R8 LMS Evo II	88	(Italy) Leonardo Moncini	G	1–3
(Italy) Tresor Attempto Racing	Audi R8 LMS Evo II	88	(Italy) Rocco Mazzola	G	3, 5
(Italy) Tresor Attempto Racing	Audi R8 LMS Evo II	88	(Netherlands) Job van Uitert	G	4–5
(Italy) Tresor Attempto Racing	Audi R8 LMS Evo II	99	(Germany) Alex Aka	S	All
(Italy) Tresor Attempto Racing	Audi R8 LMS Evo II	99	(Italy) Alberto Di Folco	S	1–4
(Italy) Tresor Attempto Racing	Audi R8 LMS Evo II	99	(Argentina) Ezequiel Pérez Companc	S	1–3
(Italy) Tresor Attempto Racing	Audi R8 LMS Evo II	99	(United States) Phillippe Denes	S	3
(Italy) Tresor Attempto Racing	Audi R8 LMS Evo II	99	(Italy) Leonardo Moncini	S	4–5
(Italy) Tresor Attempto Racing	Audi R8 LMS Evo II	99	(Denmark) Sebastian Øgaard	S	5
(United Kingdom) Barwell Motorsport	Lamborghini Huracán GT3 Evo 2	76	(Canada) Adam Ali	S	1–2
(United Kingdom) Barwell Motorsport	Lamborghini Huracán GT3 Evo 2	76	(United States) Christian Bogle	S	1–2
(United Kingdom) Barwell Motorsport	Lamborghini Huracán GT3 Evo 2	76	(United States) Bijoy Garg	S	1–2
(United Kingdom) Barwell Motorsport	Lamborghini Huracán GT3 Evo 2	76	(Canada) Adam Ali	B	3
(United Kingdom) Barwell Motorsport	Lamborghini Huracán GT3 Evo 2	76	(United Kingdom) Ricky Collard	B	3
(United Kingdom) Barwell Motorsport	Lamborghini Huracán GT3 Evo 2	76	(United Kingdom) Rob Collard	B	3
(United Kingdom) Barwell Motorsport	Lamborghini Huracán GT3 Evo 2	76	(United States) Bijoy Garg	B	3
(United Kingdom) Greystone GT	McLaren 720S GT3 Evo	77	(Australia) Jayden Kelly	S	5
(United Kingdom) Greystone GT	McLaren 720S GT3 Evo	77	(United Kingdom) Zac Meakin	S	5
(United Kingdom) Greystone GT	McLaren 720S GT3 Evo	77	(United Kingdom) Michael O'Brien	S	5
(Germany) Lionspeed GP	Porsche 911 GT3 R (992)	80	(Switzerland) Ricardo Feller	B	All
(Germany) Lionspeed GP	Porsche 911 GT3 R (992)	80	(Germany) Patrick Kolb	B	All
(Germany) Lionspeed GP	Porsche 911 GT3 R (992)	80	(Italy) Gabriel Rindone	B	All
(Germany) Lionspeed GP	Porsche 911 GT3 R (992)	80	(Italy) Riccardo Pera	B	3
(Germany) Herberth Motorsport	Porsche 911 GT3 R (992)	91	(Germany) Ralf Bohn	B	1–4
(Germany) Herberth Motorsport	Porsche 911 GT3 R (992)	91	(Germany) Alfred Renauer	B	1–4
(Germany) Herberth Motorsport	Porsche 911 GT3 R (992)	91	(Germany) Robert Renauer	B	1–4
(Germany) Herberth Motorsport	Porsche 911 GT3 R (992)	91	(Zimbabwe) Axcil Jefferies	B	3
(Germany) Herberth Motorsport	Porsche 911 GT3 R (992)	92	(Germany) Tim Heinemann	G	1–4
(Germany) Herberth Motorsport	Porsche 911 GT3 R (992)	92	(Switzerland) Rolf Ineichen	G	1–4
(Germany) Herberth Motorsport	Porsche 911 GT3 R (992)	92	(Germany) Joel Sturm	G	1–4
(Germany) Herberth Motorsport	Porsche 911 GT3 R (992)	92	(Germany) Ralf Bohn	B	5
(Germany) Herberth Motorsport	Porsche 911 GT3 R (992)	92	(Germany) Tim Heinemann	B	5
(Germany) Herberth Motorsport	Porsche 911 GT3 R (992)	92	(Germany) Alfred Renauer	B	5
(Germany) Rutronik Racing	Porsche 911 GT3 R (992)	96	(Germany) Sven Müller	P	All
(Germany) Rutronik Racing	Porsche 911 GT3 R (992)	96	(Switzerland) Patric Niederhauser	P	All
(Germany) Rutronik Racing	Porsche 911 GT3 R (992)	96	(Belgium) Alessio Picariello	P	All
(Germany) Rutronik Racing	Porsche 911 GT3 R (992)	97	(Hong Kong) Antares Au	B	All
(Germany) Rutronik Racing	Porsche 911 GT3 R (992)	97	(Netherlands) Loek Hartog	B	All
(Germany) Rutronik Racing	Porsche 911 GT3 R (992)	97	(Netherlands) Morris Schuring	B	1, 3–5
(Germany) Rutronik Racing	Porsche 911 GT3 R (992)	97	(Estonia) Martin Rump	B	3
(Germany) ROWE Racing	BMW M4 GT3 Evo	98	(Brazil) Augusto Farfus	P	All
(Germany) ROWE Racing	BMW M4 GT3 Evo	98	(Finland) Jesse Krohn	P	All
(Germany) ROWE Racing	BMW M4 GT3 Evo	98	(Switzerland) Raffaele Marciello	P	All
(Germany) ROWE Racing	BMW M4 GT3 Evo	998	(Austria) Philipp Eng	P	3
(Germany) ROWE Racing	BMW M4 GT3 Evo	998	(United Kingdom) Dan Harper	P	3
(Germany) ROWE Racing	BMW M4 GT3 Evo	998	(Germany) Max Hesse	P	3
(United Kingdom) Beechdean Motorsport	Aston Martin Vantage AMR GT3 Evo	100	(United Kingdom) Ross Gunn	PA	3
(United Kingdom) Beechdean Motorsport	Aston Martin Vantage AMR GT3 Evo	100	(France) Valentin Hasse-Clot	PA	3
(United Kingdom) Beechdean Motorsport	Aston Martin Vantage AMR GT3 Evo	100	(United Kingdom) Andrew Howard	PA	3
(United Kingdom) Beechdean Motorsport	Aston Martin Vantage AMR GT3 Evo	100	(United States) Anthony McIntosh	PA	3
(France) CSA Racing	McLaren 720S GT3 Evo	111	(France) Simon Gachet	G	All
(France) CSA Racing	McLaren 720S GT3 Evo	111	(United Kingdom) James Kell	G	All
(France) CSA Racing	McLaren 720S GT3 Evo	111	(France) Arthur Rougier	G	All
(France) CSA Racing	McLaren 720S GT3 Evo	111	(France) Jim Pla	G	3
(France) CSA Racing	McLaren 720S GT3 Evo	112	(France) Edgar Maloigne	S	All
(France) CSA Racing	McLaren 720S GT3 Evo	112	(France) Maxime Robin	S	All
(France) CSA Racing	McLaren 720S GT3 Evo	112	(India) Sai Sanjay	S	All
(France) CSA Racing	McLaren 720S GT3 Evo	112	(United Kingdom) Josh Mason	S	3
(United States) Wright Motorsports	Porsche 911 GT3 R (992)	120	(United States) Adam Adelson	G	3–4
(United States) Wright Motorsports	Porsche 911 GT3 R (992)	120	(United States) Elliott Skeer	G	3–4
(United States) Wright Motorsports	Porsche 911 GT3 R (992)	120	(Australia) Tom Sargent	G	3–4
(Germany) Paul Motorsport	Lamborghini Huracán GT3 Evo 2	333	(Italy) Marzio Moretti	G	All
(Germany) Paul Motorsport	Lamborghini Huracán GT3 Evo 2	333	(Germany) Maximilian Paul	G	All
(Germany) Paul Motorsport	Lamborghini Huracán GT3 Evo 2	333	(United States) John Paul Southern Jr.	G	All
(Germany) Paul Motorsport	Lamborghini Huracán GT3 Evo 2	333	(Poland) Robin Rogalski	G	3
(Germany) Nordique Racing	Mercedes-AMG GT3 Evo	611	(Italy) Edoardo Liberati	P	1, 4–5
(Germany) Nordique Racing	Mercedes-AMG GT3 Evo	611	(Japan) Yuichi Nakayama	P	1, 4–5
(Germany) Nordique Racing	Mercedes-AMG GT3 Evo	611	(Japan) Kazuto Kotaka	P	1
(Germany) Nordique Racing	Mercedes-AMG GT3 Evo	611	(United Kingdom) Adam Christodoulou	P	4–5
(Germany) Nordique Racing	Mercedes-AMG GT3 Evo	611	(Japan) Kazuto Kotaka	G	2–3
(Germany) Nordique Racing	Mercedes-AMG GT3 Evo	611	(Italy) Edoardo Liberati	G	2–3
(Germany) Nordique Racing	Mercedes-AMG GT3 Evo	611	(Germany) Tim Sandtler	G	2–3
(Germany) Nordique Racing	Mercedes-AMG GT3 Evo	611	(Japan) Yuichi Nakayama	G	3
(Lithuania) Pure Rxcing	Porsche 911 GT3 R (992)	911	(Austria) Richard Lietz	P	All
(Lithuania) Pure Rxcing	Porsche 911 GT3 R (992)	911	Alex Malykhin (Note: Malykhin is Belarusian, but he competes as a neutral competitor as Belarusian national emblems were banned by the FIA following the Russian invasion of Ukraine.)	P	All
(Lithuania) Pure Rxcing	Porsche 911 GT3 R (992)	911	(Austria) Thomas Preining	P	All
(United Kingdom) Paradine Competition	BMW M4 GT3 Evo	991	(Indonesia) Sean Gelael	B	All
(United Kingdom) Paradine Competition	BMW M4 GT3 Evo	991	(United Kingdom) Darren Leung	B	All
(United Kingdom) Paradine Competition	BMW M4 GT3 Evo	991	(United Kingdom) Dan Harper	B	1, 4
(United Kingdom) Paradine Competition	BMW M4 GT3 Evo	991	(United Kingdom) Ashley Sutton	B	2
(United Kingdom) Paradine Competition	BMW M4 GT3 Evo	991	(United Kingdom) Jake Dennis	B	3, 5
(United Kingdom) Paradine Competition	BMW M4 GT3 Evo	991	(United Kingdom) Toby Sowery	B	3
(United Kingdom) Paradine Competition	BMW M4 GT3 Evo	992	(United Kingdom) Charles Clark	S	All
(United Kingdom) Paradine Competition	BMW M4 GT3 Evo	992	(Brazil) Pedro Ebrahim	S	All
(United Kingdom) Paradine Competition	BMW M4 GT3 Evo	992	(United Kingdom) James Kellett	S	All
(United Kingdom) Paradine Competition	BMW M4 GT3 Evo	992	(Netherlands) Maxime Oosten	S	3

Icon	Class
P	Pro Cup
G	Gold Cup
S	Silver Cup
B	Bronze Cup
PA	Pro-Am Cup

- Charlie Fagg, Thomas Ikin and Nicolai Kjærgaard were scheduled to share Optimum Motorsport's lone McLaren, but the team reshuffled its lineup prior to the start of the season.
- Matisse Lismont was scheduled to compete for Comtoyou Racing, but switched to Steller Motorsport prior to the start of the season. He then jumped ship again in the aftermath of the 24 Hours of Spa, joining Team WRT.
- Baudouin Detout and Isa Al Khalifa provisionally entered the 24 Hours of Spa for Comtoyou Racing and 2 Seas Motorsport respectively, but were later replaced by Rodrigo Almeida and Parker Thompson. Also at 2 Seas Motorsport, Charles Dawson was a late replacement for bronze-rated Kevin Tse. Wyatt Brichacek, who was listed against both the No. 26 Saintéloc and No. 76 Barwell entries, only took up the former. Daniel Morad was named in the No. 57 Winward effort before the team opted for a three-man crew.
- Steller Motorsport was scheduled to field a pair of Chevrolet Corvette Z06 GT3.R full-time, before it downscaled its second entry to just the 24 Hours of Spa. The No. 424 car was eventually scrapped.
- Marta García was scheduled to compete for UNX Racing in the final two races, but did not appear at either round.
- Two teams announced plans to compete but were either not selected or withdrew: Razoon – more than racing with a Porsche 911 GT3 R (992) and One Group Engineering with a Lamborghini Huracán GT3 Evo 2.

== Race results ==
Round	Circuit	Pole position	Overall winners	Gold winners	Silver winners	Bronze winners	Pro/Am Winners	Report
1	(France) Paul Ricard	(United States) #48 Mercedes-AMG Team Mann-Filter	(Belgium) #32 Team WRT	(France) #111 CSA Racing	(United Kingdom) #992 Paradine Competition	(Switzerland) #74 Kessel Racing	No Entries	Report
1	(France) Paul Ricard	(Austria) Lucas Auer (Italy) Matteo Cairoli (Germany) Maro Engel	(Belgium) Ugo de Wilde (South Africa) Kelvin van der Linde (Belgium) Charles Weerts	(France) Simon Gachet (United Kingdom) James Kell (France) Arthur Rougier	(United Kingdom) Charles Clark (Brazil) Pedro Ebrahim (United Kingdom) James Kellett	(United States) Dustin Blattner (Germany) Dennis Marschall (Denmark) Conrad Laursen	No Entries	Report
2	(Italy) Monza	(Germany) #17 Mercedes-AMG Team GetSpeed	(United States) #48 Mercedes-AMG Team Mann-Filter	(Oman) #777 AlManar Racing by WRT	(United Kingdom) #42 Century Motorsport	(Germany) #97 Rutronik Racing	No Entries	Report
2	(Italy) Monza	(Andorra) Jules Gounon (Germany) Fabian Schiller (Germany) Luca Stolz	(Austria) Lucas Auer (Italy) Matteo Cairoli (Germany) Maro Engel	(Oman) Al Faisal Al Zubair (Germany) Jens Klingmann (United Kingdom) Ben Tuck	(Netherlands) Mex Jansen (United Kingdom) Will Moore (South Africa) Jarrod Waberski	(Hong Kong) Antares Au (Netherlands) Loek Hartog	No Entries	Report
3	(Belgium) Spa-Francorchamps	(United Kingdom) #59 Garage 59	(Austria) #63 GRT - Grasser Racing Team	(Netherlands) #33 Verstappen.com Racing	(Germany) #35 Walkenhorst Motorsport	(Switzerland) #74 Kessel Racing	(France) #29 AV Racing by Car Collection Motorsport	Report
3	(Belgium) Spa-Francorchamps	(Germany) Benjamin Goethe (Germany) Marvin Kirchhöfer (United Kingdom) Joseph Loake	(Italy) Mirko Bortolotti (Germany) Luca Engstler (South Africa) Jordan Pepper	(United Kingdom) Harry King (United Kingdom) Chris Lulham (Netherlands) Thierry Vermeulen	(France) Romain Leroux (Sweden) Oliver Söderström (Ecuador) Mateo Villagómez	(United States) Dustin Blattner (Denmark) Conrad Laursen (Germany) Dennis Marschall (Canada) Zacharie Robichon	(France) Noam Abramczyk (Belgium) Mathieu Detry (Belgium) Fabian Duffieux (China) Bo Yuan	Report
4	(Germany) Nürburgring	(Belgium) #32 Team WRT	(Germany) #98 ROWE Racing	(Oman) #777 AlManar Racing by WRT	(Belgium) #10 Boutsen VDS	(Bahrain) #222 2 Seas Motorsport	No Entries	Report
4	(Germany) Nürburgring	(Belgium) Ugo de Wilde (South Africa) Kelvin van der Linde (Belgium) Charles Weerts	(Brazil) Augusto Farfus (Finland) Jesse Krohn (Switzerland) Raffaele Marciello	(Oman) Al Faisal Al Zubair (Germany) Jens Klingmann (United Kingdom) Ben Tuck	(France) Loris Cabirou (France) César Gazeau (France) Aurélien Panis	(United Kingdom) Ben Barnicoat (United Kingdom) Charles Dawson (United Kingdom) Tom Lebbon	No Entries	Report
5	(Spain) Barcelona	(United Kingdom) #58 Garage 59	(United Kingdom) #58 Garage 59	(United Kingdom) #58 Garage 59	(Italy) #99 Tresor Attempto Racing	(Germany) #97 Rutronik Racing	No Entries	Report
5	(Spain) Barcelona	(United Kingdom) Dean MacDonald (Monaco) Louis Prette (United Kingdom) Adam Smalley	(United Kingdom) Dean MacDonald (Monaco) Louis Prette (United Kingdom) Adam Smalley	(United Kingdom) Dean MacDonald (Monaco) Louis Prette (United Kingdom) Adam Smalley	(Germany) Alex Aka (Italy) Leonardo Moncini (Denmark) Sebastian Øgaard	(Hong Kong) Antares Au (Netherlands) Loek Hartog (Netherlands) Morris Schuring	No Entries	Report

== Championship standings ==
Scoring system

Championship points are awarded for the first ten positions in each race. The pole-sitter also receives one point and entries are required to complete 75% of the winning car's race distance in order to be classified and earn points. Individual drivers are required to participate for a minimum of 25 minutes in order to earn championship points in any race.

Monza, Nürburgring & Barcelona points

Position	1st	2nd	3rd	4th	5th	6th	7th	8th	9th	10th	Pole
Points	25	18	15	12	10	8	6	4	2	1	1

Paul Ricard points

Position	1st	2nd	3rd	4th	5th	6th	7th	8th	9th	10th	Pole
Points	33	24	19	15	12	9	6	4	2	1	1

24 Hours of Spa points

Points are awarded after six hours, after twelve hours and at the finish.

Position	1st	2nd	3rd	4th	5th	6th	7th	8th	9th	10th
Points after 6hrs/12hrs	12	9	7	6	5	4	3	2	1	0
Points at the finish	25	18	15	12	10	8	6	4	2	1

Additionally, points are awarded to the top 3 in Super Pole.

Position	1st	2nd	3rd
Points	3	2	1

=== Drivers' Championship ===
==== Overall ====
Pos.	Drivers	Team	LEC (France)	MNZ (Italy)	SPA (Belgium)			NÜR (Germany)	BAR (Spain)	Points
Pos.	Drivers	Team	LEC (France)	MNZ (Italy)	6hrs	12hrs	24hrs	NÜR (Germany)	BAR (Spain)	Points
1	(Germany) Sven Müller (Switzerland) Patric Niederhauser (Belgium) Alessio Picariello	(Germany) Rutronik Racing	2	21	4	6	2	3	7	73
2	(Austria) Lucas Auer (Italy) Matteo Cairoli (Germany) Maro Engel	(United States) Mercedes-AMG Team Mann-Filter	4^{P}	1	2	7	10	2	13	72
3	(Belgium) Ugo de Wilde (South Africa) Kelvin van der Linde (Belgium) Charles Weerts	(Belgium) Team WRT	1^{F}	5	7	9	7	10^{P}	6	63
4	(Brazil) Augusto Farfus (Finland) Jesse Krohn (Switzerland) Raffaele Marciello	(Germany) ROWE Racing	7	Ret	8	8	5	1	3	60
5	(Italy) Mirko Bortolotti (Germany) Luca Engstler (South Africa) Jordan Pepper	(Austria) GRT - Grasser Racing Team	12	46†	23	2	1	5	16	44
6	(Turkey) Ayhancan Güven	(France) Schumacher CLRT	3	6	73†	73†	Ret	4	9	41
7	(Germany) Benjamin Goethe (Germany) Marvin Kirchhöfer (United Kingdom) Joseph Loake	(United Kingdom) Garage 59	Ret	2	22	4	6^{P}	8	Ret	39
8	(Italy) Mattia Drudi (Denmark) Marco Sørensen (Denmark) Nicki Thiim	(Belgium) Comtoyou Racing	5	3	6	62†	Ret	7^{F}	34	37
9	(Italy) Eliseo Donno (Italy) Antonio Fuoco (Monaco) Arthur Leclerc	(Italy) AF Corse - Francorchamps Motors	16	43†	5	5	4	DNS	4	34
10	(Oman) Al Faisal Al Zubair (Germany) Jens Klingmann (United Kingdom) Ben Tuck	(Oman) AlManar Racing by WRT	10	4	17	21	20	12	2	31
11	(Austria) Klaus Bachler (Germany) Laurin Heinrich	(France) Schumacher CLRT	3		73†	73†	Ret	4		31
12	(United Kingdom) Dean MacDonald (Monaco) Louis Prette (United Kingdom) Adam Smalley	(United Kingdom) Garage 59	Ret	Ret	28	15	12	Ret	1^{PF}	26
13	(Monaco) Vincent Abril (Italy) Alessio Rovera	(Italy) AF Corse - Francorchamps Motors	15	49†	12	3	3^{F}	46†	33	22
13	(Italy) Alessandro Pier Guidi	(Italy) AF Corse - Francorchamps Motors	15	49†	12	3	3^{F}	46†		22
14	(Andorra) Jules Gounon (Germany) Fabian Schiller (Germany) Luca Stolz	(Germany) Mercedes-AMG Team GetSpeed	13	48†^{PF}	1	60†	Ret^{2}	22	14	15
15	(Austria) Philipp Eng (Germany) Max Hesse	(Germany) ROWE Racing			9	1	29			13
15	(United Kingdom) Dan Harper	(United Kingdom) Paradine Competition	27					Ret		13
15	(United Kingdom) Dan Harper	(Germany) ROWE Racing			9	1	29			13
16	(Germany) Alex Aka	(Germany) Tresor Attempto Racing	23	13	16	61†	Ret	Ret	5	10
16	(Italy) Leonardo Moncini (Denmark) Sebastian Øgaard	(Germany) Tresor Attempto Racing	21	16	58	44	47†	Ret	5	10
17	(Netherlands) Larry ten Voorde	(France) Schumacher CLRT		6					9	10
18	(United Kingdom) Sandy Mitchell (France) Franck Perera	(Italy) VSR	14	9	3	46	Ret	15	21	9
19	(France) Simon Gachet (United Kingdom) James Kell (France) Arthur Rougier	(France) CSA Racing	6	Ret	14	13	13	16	31	9
20	(Netherlands) Morris Schuring	(Germany) Rutronik Racing	39		66	57	45	35	12	8
20	(Netherlands) Morris Schuring	(France) Schumacher CLRT		6						8
20	(France) Thomas Drouet (India) Arjun Maini (United Kingdom) Jann Mardenborough	(Germany) HRT Ford Performance	11	Ret	40	11	Ret	6	51†	8
21	(United Kingdom) Harry King (United Kingdom) Chris Lulham (Netherlands) Thierry Vermeulen	(Netherlands) Verstappen.com Racing	9	15	11	10	9	17	8	8
22	(Italy) Marco Mapelli	(Italy) VSR	14		3	46	Ret	15		7
23	(Netherlands) Mex Jansen (United Kingdom) Will Moore (South Africa) Jarrod Waberski	(United Kingdom) Century Motorsport	24	7	30	20	23	19	23	6
24	(Portugal) Henrique Chaves (Norway) Christian Krognes (United Kingdom) David Pittard	(Germany) Walkenhorst Motorsport	8	12	WD	WD	WD	14	10	5
25	(South Africa) Sheldon van der Linde (Belgium) Dries Vanthoor (Germany) Marco Wittmann	(Belgium) Team WRT			25	17	8			4
25	(France) Étienne Cheli (Belgium) Gilles Stadsbader	(Belgium) Team WRT	53	8	33	28	24	24	50	4
25	(Sweden) Gustav Bergström	(Belgium) Team WRT	53	8	33	28	24			4
26	(Italy) Mattia Michelotto	(Italy) VSR		9	70†	70†	Ret		42	2
26	(France) Loris Cabirou (France) César Gazeau (France) Aurélien Panis	(Belgium) Boutsen VDS	40	26	18	18	27	9	19	2
26	(France) Alessandro Ghiretti	(France) Schumacher CLRT							9	2
27	(Germany) Maximilian Götz (Canada) Mikael Grenier (Belgium) Maxime Martin	(Belgium) Boutsen VDS	28	Ret	39	65†	Ret^{3}	13	Ret	1
28	(Hong Kong) Antares Au (Netherlands) Loek Hartog	(Germany) Rutronik Racing	39	10	66	57	45	35	12	1
–	(United States) Dustin Blattner (Denmark) Conrad Laursen (Germany) Dennis Marschall	(Switzerland) Kessel Racing	26	29	10	16	15	Ret	18	0
–	(Canada) Zacharie Robichon	(Switzerland) Kessel Racing			10	16	15			0
–	(Austria) Richard Lietz; Alex Malykhin (Austria) Thomas Preining	(Lithuania) Pure Rxcing	30	11	63	64†	Ret	11	11	0
–	(Denmark) Kevin Magnussen (Germany) René Rast (Italy) Valentino Rossi	(Belgium) Team WRT			13	14	11			0
–	(Denmark) Frederik Schandorff	(United Kingdom) Garage 59			28	15	12			0
–	(Switzerland) Ricardo Feller (Germany) Patrick Kolb (Italy) Gabriel Rindone	(Germany) Lionspeed GP	38	40	42	12	21	33	26	0
–	(Italy) Riccardo Pera	(Germany) Lionspeed GP			42	12	21			0
–	(France) Jim Pla	(France) CSA Racing			14	13	13			0
–	(Italy) Alberto Di Folco	(Germany) Tresor Attempto Racing	23	13	16	61†	Ret	Ret		0
–	(Argentina) Ezequiel Pérez Companc	(Germany) Tresor Attempto Racing	23	13	16	61†	Ret			0
–	(Germany) Marvin Dienst (Italy) Gabriele Piana; Rinat Salikhov	(United States) Winward Racing	33	14	38	26	17	41	Ret	0
–	(France) Romain Leroux (Sweden) Oliver Söderström (Ecuador) Mateo Villagómez	(Germany) Walkenhorst Motorsport	42	42	35	29	14	47	Ret	0
–	(United States) Adam Adelson (Australia) Tom Sargent (United States) Elliott Skeer	(United States) Wright Motorsports			15	19	16	28		0
–	(Austria) Max Hofer; Andrey Mukovoz; Alexey Nesov	(Germany) Tresor Attempto Racing	50	Ret	51	63†	Ret	40	15	0
–	(Italy) Riccardo Cazzaniga	(Germany) Tresor Attempto Racing	21	16	58	44	47†	Ret	Ret	0
–	(United States) Philippe Denes	(Germany) Tresor Attempto Racing			16	61†	Ret			0
–	(United States) Neil Verhagen	(Oman) AlManar Racing by Team WRT			17	21	20			0
–	(United Kingdom) Tom Fleming (Portugal) Guilherme Oliveira	(United Kingdom) Garage 59	54	17	49	22	22	18	36	0
–	(Netherlands) Daan Arrow	(United States) Winward Racing			38	26	17			0
–	(Republic of Ireland) Reece Barr (United Kingdom) Alex Buncombe (United Kingdom) Tommy Foster	(United Kingdom) Team RJN	17	41	31	55	Ret	25	25	0
–	(Portugal) Miguel Ramos	(United Kingdom) Garage 59	54	17						0
–	(Thailand) Tanart Sathienthirakul (United Kingdom) Aaron Walker	(Germany) GetSpeed	29	47†	68†	68†	Ret	30	17	0
–	(Germany) Tom Kalender	(Germany) GetSpeed			64†	66†	Ret		17	0
–	(United Kingdom) Hugo Cook	(Belgium) Boutsen VDS			18	18	27			0
–	(Ukraine) Ivan Klymenko (Belgium) Lorens Lecertua	(France) Saintéloc Racing	22	Ret	27	33	18	49	20	0
–	(United Kingdom) Charles Clark (Brazil) Pedro Ebrahim (United Kingdom) James Kellett	(United Kingdom) Paradine Competition	18	22	34	27	Ret	21	35	0
–	(United States) Wyatt Brichacek (Belgium) Lorenzo Donniacuo	(France) Saintéloc Racing			27	33	18			0
–	(United States) Anthony Bartone (Poland) Karol Basz (Switzerland) Yannick Mettler	(Germany) GetSpeed	43	18	64†	66†	Ret	27	27	0
–	(United Kingdom) James Baldwin	(United Kingdom) Garage 59						18	36	0
–	(Belgium) Matisse Lismont	(United Kingdom) Steller Motorsport	19	32	19	52	40			0
–	(Belgium) Matisse Lismont	(Belgium) Team WRT						24	50	0
–	(United Kingdom) Lorcan Hanafin	(United Kingdom) Steller Motorsport	19	32	19	52	40	Ret	45	0
–	(France) Paul Evrard (Belgium) Gilles Magnus (France) Benjamin Ricci	(France) Saintéloc Racing	37	27	41	24	19	37	Ret	0
–	(United States) Reece Gold	(France) Saintéloc Racing		Ret	41	24	19	49	20	0
-	(United Kingdom) Kiern Jewiss	(United Kingdom) Steller Motorsport	19							0
-	(United Kingdom) Kiern Jewiss	(Bahrain) 2 Seas Motorsport			56	40	26		44	0
–	(France) Romain Andriolo (Germany) David Schumacher (Germany) Finn Wiebelhaus	(Germany) HRT Ford Performance	34	19	29	30	35†	20	43	0
–	(Canada) Daniel Ali	(United Kingdom) Steller Motorsport		32	19	52†	40	Ret	45	0
–	(Netherlands) Olivier Hart	(United Kingdom) Steller Motorsport			19	52†	40			0
–	(Germany) Tim Heinemann	(Germany) Herberth Motorsport	20	Ret	50	31	51†	23	Ret	0
–	(Switzerland) Rolf Ineichen (Germany) Joel Sturm	(Germany) Herberth Motorsport	20	Ret	50	31	51†	23		0
–	(Belgium) Jef Machiels (Belgium) Louis Machiels	(Italy) AF Corse - Francorchamps Motors	45	20	53	37	33	45	40	0
-	(Italy) Andrea Bertolini	(Italy) AF Corse - Francorchamps Motors	45	20						0
–	(Japan) Tatsuya Kataoka (Japan) Kamui Kobayashi (Japan) Nobuteru Taniguchi	(Japan) Goodsmile Racing			20	50	48†			0
–	(United Arab Emirates) Federico Al Rifai (Netherlands) Jop Rappange	(Italy) Dinamic GT	55	45†	21	43	30	32	29	0
–	(Sri Lanka) Eshan Pieris (France) Sébastien Baud	(Italy) Dinamic GT			21	43	30			0
–	(Italy) Loris Spinelli	(France) VSR							21	0
–	(Switzerland) Lucas Légeret	(France) Saintéloc Racing	22							0
–	(United Kingdom) Shaun Balfe (United Kingdom) Jack Hawksworth	(United Kingdom) Garage 59			49	22	22			0
–	(Indonesia) Sean Gelael (United Kingdom) Darren Leung	(United Kingdom) Paradine Competition	27	25	46	56	Ret	Ret	22	0
–	(United Kingdom) Jake Dennis	(United Kingdom) Paradine Competition			46	56	Ret		22	0
–	(Germany) Ralf Bohn (Germany) Alfred Renauer	(Germany) Herberth Motorsport	35	28	32	23	25	38	Ret	0
–	(Germany) Robert Renauer	(Germany) Herberth Motorsport	35	28	32	23	25	38		0
–	(Zimbabwe) Axcil Jefferies	(Germany) Herberth Motorsport			32	23	25			0
–	(Qatar) Abdulla Ali Al-Khelaifi (Qatar) Ghanim Salah Al-Maadheed	(Qatar) QMMF by Saintéloc Racing	47	23	65	58	46	44	28	0
–	(Qatar) Ibrahim Al-Abdulghani	(Qatar) QMMF by Saintéloc Racing	47	23	65	58	46	44		0
–	(United Kingdom) Ross Gunn (France) Valentin Hasse-Clot (United Kingdom) Andrew Howard (United States) Anthony McIntosh	(United Kingdom) Beechdean Motorsport			24	34	32			0
–	(France) Pierre-Louis Chovet	(Belgium) Team WRT			33	28	24			0
–	(Denmark) Largim Ali (Australia) James Allen (United Kingdom) Mikey Porter	(United Kingdom) Optimum Motorsport	52	24	43	39	39	29	41	0
–	(Australia) Jayden Kelly (United Kingdom) Zac Meakin (United Kingdom) Michael O'Brien	(United Kingdom) Greystone GT							24	0
–	(United Kingdom) Finlay Hutchison	(Italy) VSR	25							0
–	(United Kingdom) Ashley Sutton	(United Kingdom) Paradine Competition		25						0
–	(Italy) Michele Beretta (Italy) Alessio Deledda	(Italy) VSR	25	35	70†	70†	Ret	51	42	0
–	(Italy) Eddie Cheever III	(United Kingdom) Ziggo Sport - Tempesta	48	37	37	25	50†	Ret	39	0
–	(United Kingdom) Chris Froggatt	(United Kingdom) Ziggo Sport - Tempesta	48	37	37	25	50†		39	0
–	(Hong Kong) Jonathan Hui	(United Kingdom) Ziggo Sport - Tempesta		37	37	25	50†			0
–	(Italy) Lorenzo Patrese	(Italy) Ziggo Sport - Tempesta Racing			37	25	50†	Ret		0
–	(United Kingdom) Charles Dawson	(Bahrain) 2 Seas Motorsport			56	40	26	31	44	0
–	(Belgium) Nicolas Baert (United Arab Emirates) Jamie Day (Belgium) Kobe Pauwels	(Belgium) Comtoyou Racing	36	Ret	62	54	Ret	26	49	0
–	(Canada) Parker Thompson (United Kingdom) Lewis Williamson	(Bahrain) 2 Seas Motorsport			56	40	26			0
–	(Netherlands) Indy Dontje (Switzerland) Philip Ellis (United States) Russell Ward	(United States) Winward Racing			26	59†	Ret			0
–	(Netherlands) Maxime Oosten	(United Kingdom) Paradine Competition			34	27	Ret			0
–	(Italy) David Fumanelli (Switzerland) Nicolò Rosi (Italy) Niccolò Schirò	(Switzerland) Kessel Racing	31	34	60	48	28	36	Ret	0
–	(Germany) Julian Hanses	(Qatar) QMMF by Saintéloc Racing			64	58	46		28	0
–	(Italy) Daniele Di Amato	(Switzerland) Kessel Racing			60	48	28			0
–	(Germany) Salman Owega	(Germany) HRT Ford Performance			29	30	35			0
–	(Denmark) Mikkel O. Pedersen	(Italy) Dinamic GT		45†				32	29	0
–	(Netherlands) Colin Caresani	(Germany) GetSpeed	29	47†	68†	68†	Ret			0
–	(Italy) Felice Jelmini (Italy) Federico Malvestiti (Brazil) Marcelo Tomasoni	(Italy) BMW Italia Ceccato Racing	Ret	30	57	42	49†	39	32	0
–	(Italy) Edoardo Liberati	(Germany) Nordique Racing	51	33	47	35	37	52†	30	0
–	(Japan) Yuichi Nakayama	(Germany) Nordique Racing	51		47	35	37	52†	30	0
–	(United Kingdom) Adam Christodoulou	(Germany) Nordique Racing						52†	30	0
–	(Netherlands) Lin Hodenius	(Germany) GetSpeed			68†	68†	Ret	30		0
–	(Italy) Marzio Moretti (Germany) Maximilian Paul (United States) John Paul Southern Jr.	(Germany) Paul Motorsport	49	31	45	32	42	43	37	0
–	(Belgium) Mathieu Detry (Belgium) Fabian Duffieux	(France) AV Racing by Car Collection Motorsport			54	41	31			0
–	(Belgium) Mathieu Detry (Belgium) Fabian Duffieux	(Italy) UNX Racing						34	46	0
–	(France) Noam Abramczyk (China) Bo Yuan	(France) AV Racing by Car Collection Motorsport			54	41	31			0
–	(Germany) Ben Dörr	(United Kingdom) Team RJN			31	55	Ret			0
–	(United Kingdom) Tom Lebbon	(Bahrain) 2 Seas Motorsport						31	44	0
–	(United Kingdom) Ben Barnicoat	(Bahrain) 2 Seas Motorsport						31		0
–	(Netherlands) Dante Rappange	(Austria) GRT - Grasser Racing Team	32	44†	52	36	Ret	50	47	0
–	Ivan Ekelchik (Belgium) Baptiste Moulin	(Austria) GRT - Grasser Racing Team	32	44†	52	36	Ret	50		0
–	(Poland) Robert Rogalski	(Germany) Paul Motorsport			45	32	42			0
–	(Japan) Kazuto Kotaka	(Germany) Nordique Racing	51	33	47	35	37			0
–	(Germany) Tim Sandtler	(Germany) Nordique Racing		33	47	35	37			0
–	(Italy) Tommaso Mosca	(Italy) AF Corse - Francorchamps Motors			53	37	33	45	40	0
–	(Argentina) Marcos Siebert	(Italy) AF Corse - Francorchamps Motors			53	37	33			0
–	(China) Yifei Ye	(Italy) AF Corse - Francorchamps Motors							33	0
–	(Canada) Adam Ali	(United Kingdom) Barwell Motorsport	44	36	48	38	34			0
–	(Canada) Adam Ali	(United Kingdom) Steller Motorsport							45	0
–	(United States) Bijoy Garg	(United Kingdom) Barwell Motorsport	44	36	48	38	34			0
–	(United Kingdom) Ricky Collard (United Kingdom) Rob Collard	(United Kingdom) Barwell Motorsport			48	38	34			0
–	(Italy) Andrea Frassineti	(Italy) VSR		35	70†	70†	Ret			0
–	(United States) Christian Bogle	(United Kingdom) Barwell Motorsport	44	36						0
–	(Belgium) Simon Balcaen (Belgium) Xavier Knauf (France) Steven Palette (Belgium) Gregory Servais	(Antigua and Barbuda) Haas RT			36	45	44			0
–	(United States) Colin Braun (Netherlands) Nicky Catsburg (United Kingdom) Ian James (United States) George Kurtz	(United States) CrowdStrike by SPS			59	47	36			0
–	(China) Liang Jiatong	(Austria) GRT - Grasser Racing Team			52	36	Ret			0
–	(South Africa) David Perel	(Germany) Rinaldi Racing	41	38	44	49	41	DNS	38	0
–	(Germany) Christian Hook (Italy) Davide Rigon	(Germany) Rinaldi Racing	41	38	44	49	41			0
–	(Belgium) Stéphane Lémeret (Spain) Miguel Molina (Argentina) Luis Pérez Companc (Argentina) Mathias Perez Companc	(Italy) AF Corse			55	53	38			0
–	(Italy) Fabrizio Crestani (Spain) Rafael Durán	(Germany) Rinaldi Racing						DNS	38	0
–	(United Kingdom) Ollie Millroy	(United Kingdom) Optimum Motorsport			43	39	39			0
–	(France) Edgar Maloigne (France) Maxime Robin (India) Sai Sanjay	(France) CSA Racing	Ret	39	74†	74†	Ret	42	Ret	0
–	(Italy) Marco Pulcini	(United Kingdom) Ziggo Sport - Tempesta	48					Ret	39	0
–	(Germany) Felipe Fernández Laser	(Germany) Rinaldi Racing			44	49	41			0
–	(United States) Connor De Phillippi	(Italy) BMW Italia Ceccato Racing			57	42	49†			0
–	(Malaysia) Prince Abu Bakar Ibrahim (Malaysia) H. H. Prince Jefri Ibrahim (Australia) Jordan Love (United Kingdom) Alexander Sims	(Malaysia) Johor Motorsports JMR			61	51	43			0
–	(Italy) Rocco Mazzola	(Germany) Tresor Attempto Racing			58	44	47†		Ret	0
–	(Estonia) Martin Rump	(Germany) Rutronik Racing			66	57	45			0
–	(United Kingdom) Toby Sowery	(United Kingdom) Paradine Competition			46	56	Ret			0
–	(United Kingdom) Jessica Hawkins (Belgium) Alexandre Leroy (Belgium) Antoine Potty	(Belgium) Comtoyou Racing	46	WD	71†	71†	Ret	48		0
–	(Denmark) Bastian Buus	(Italy) Dinamic GT			69†	69†	Ret			0
–	(Denmark) Bastian Buus	(Italy) UNX Racing							46	0
–	(Spain) Isaac Tutumlu Lopez (Austria) Gerhard Tweraser	(Austria) GRT - Grasser Racing Team							47	0
–	(Luxembourg) Dylan Pereira	(Germany) Tresor Attempto Racing			51	63†	Ret			0
–	(Israel) Artem Petrov	(Italy) VSR						51		0
–	(Netherlands) Xavier Maassen	(Belgium) Comtoyou Racing			62	54	Ret			0
–	(Guatemala) Mateo Llarena	(Italy) Dinamic GT	55							0
–	(Mexico) Sebastián Álvarez (France) Frédéric Jousset (Brazil) Sérgio Sette Câmara (Portugal) Bernardo Sousa	(Belgium) Comtoyou Racing			67†	67†	Ret			0
–	(Australia) Matt Campbell (France) Mathieu Jaminet	(Italy) Dinamic GT			69†	69†	Ret			0
–	(Mozambique) Rodrigo Almeida	(Belgium) Comtoyou Racing			71†	71†	Ret			0
–	(Italy) Riccardo Agostini (United Kingdom) Matt Bell (United States) Blake McDonald (Brazil) Custodio Toledo	(Italy) AF Corse			72†	72†	Ret			0
–	(United Kingdom) Josh Mason	(France) CSA Racing			74†	74†	Ret			0
–	(Netherlands) Job van Uitert	(Italy) Tresor Attempto Racing						Ret	Ret	0
–	(United States) Alec Udell	(United Kingdom) Steller Motorsport						Ret		0
Pos.	Drivers	Team	LEC (France)	MNZ (Italy)	SPA (Belgium)			NÜR (Germany)	BAR (Spain)	Points
Pos.	Drivers	Team	LEC (France)	MNZ (Italy)	6hrs	12hrs	24hrs	NÜR (Germany)	BAR (Spain)	Points

Key
Colour	Result
Gold	Race winner
Silver	2nd place
Bronze	3rd place
Green	Points finish
Blue	Non-points finish
Blue	Non-classified finish (NC)
Purple	Did not finish (Ret)
Black	Disqualified (DSQ)
Black	Excluded (EX)
White	Did not start (DNS)
White	Race cancelled (C)
White	Withdrew (WD)
Blank	Did not participate

^{P} – Pole
^{F} – Fastest Lap
^{2, 3} – Top 3 Super Pole positions at the 24 Hours of Spa

Notes:

- † – Entry did not finish the race but was classified, as it completed more than 75% of the race distance.

==== Gold Cup ====
Pos.	Drivers	Team	LEC (France)	MNZ (Italy)	SPA (Belgium)			NÜR (Germany)	BAR (Spain)	Points
Pos.	Drivers	Team	LEC (France)	MNZ (Italy)	6hrs	12hrs	24hrs	NÜR (Germany)	BAR (Spain)	Points
1	(United Kingdom) Harry King (United Kingdom) Chris Lulham (Netherlands) Thierry Vermeulen	(Netherlands) Verstappen.com Racing	9	15	11	10	9	17^{F}	8	121
2	(Oman) Al Faisal Al Zubair (Germany) Jens Klingmann (United Kingdom) Ben Tuck	(Oman) AlManar Racing by WRT	10	4	17	21	20	12	2	108
3	(France) Simon Gachet (United Kingdom) James Kell (France) Arthur Rougier	(France) CSA Racing	6^{F}	Ret	14	13	13^{F}	16	31	94
4	(United Kingdom) Dean MacDonald (Monaco) Louis Prette (United Kingdom) Adam Smalley	(United Kingdom) Garage 59	Ret^{P}	Ret^{PF}	28	15	12	Ret^{P}	1^{PF}	58
5	(Republic of Ireland) Reece Barr (United Kingdom) Alex Buncombe (United Kingdom) Tommy Foster	(United Kingdom) Team RJN	17	41	31	55	Ret	25	25	46
6	(Denmark) Largim Ali (Australia) James Allen (United Kingdom) Mikey Porter	(United Kingdom) Optimum Motorsport	52	24	43	39	39	29	41	37
7	(Italy) Marzio Moretti (Germany) Maximilian Paul (United States) John Paul Southern Jr.	(Germany) Paul Motorsport	49	31	45	32	42	43	37	36
8	(France) Jim Pla	(France) CSA Racing			14	13	13			33
9	(United States) Adam Adelson (Australia) Tom Sargent (United States) Elliott Skeer	(United States) Wright Motorsports			15	19	16	28		33
10	(Germany) Tim Heinemann (Switzerland) Rolf Ineichen (Germany) Joel Sturm	(Germany) Herberth Motorsport	20	Ret	50	31	51†^{P}	23		30
11	(Denmark) Frederik Schandorff	(United Kingdom) Garage 59			28	15	12			29
12	(Italy) Riccardo Cazzaniga	(Italy) Tresor Attempto Racing	21	16	58	44	47†	Ret	Ret	29
12	(Denmark) Sebastian Øgaard	(Italy) Tresor Attempto Racing	21	16	58	44	47†	Ret		29
12	(Italy) Leonardo Moncini	(Italy) Tresor Attempto Racing	21	16	58	44	47†			29
13	(United States) Neil Verhagen	(Oman) AlManar Racing by WRT			17	21	20			21
14	(Japan) Kazuto Kotaka (Italy) Edoardo Liberati (Germany) Tim Sandtler	(Germany) Nordique Racing		33	47	35	37			18
15	(Japan) Yuichi Nakayama	(Germany) Nordique Racing			47	35	37			10
16	(United Kingdom) Ollie Millroy	(United Kingdom) Optimum Motorsport			43	39	39			9
17	(Poland) Robin Rogalski	(Germany) Paul Motorsport			45	32	42			8
18	(Netherlands) Indy Dontje (Switzerland) Philip Ellis (United States) Russell Ward	(United States) Winward Racing			26	59†	Ret			5
19	(Germany) Ben Dörr	(United Kingdom) Team RJN			31	55	Ret			3
20	(Italy) Rocco Mazzola	(Italy) Tresor Attempto Racing			58	44	47†		Ret	2
–	(Netherlands) Job van Uitert	(Italy) Tresor Attempto Racing						Ret	Ret	0
Pos.	Drivers	Team	LEC (France)	MNZ (Italy)	SPA (Belgium)			NÜR (Germany)	BAR (Spain)	Points
Pos.	Drivers	Team	LEC (France)	MNZ (Italy)	6hrs	12hrs	24hrs	NÜR (Germany)	BAR (Spain)	Points

==== Silver Cup ====
Pos.	Drivers	Team	LEC (France)	MNZ (Italy)	SPA (Belgium)			NÜR (Germany)	BAR (Spain)	Points
Pos.	Drivers	Team	LEC (France)	MNZ (Italy)	6hrs	12hrs	24hrs	NÜR (Germany)	BAR (Spain)	Points
1	(Netherlands) Mex Jansen (United Kingdom) Will Moore (South Africa) Jarrod Waberski	(United Kingdom) Century Motorsport	24	7^{F}	30	20	23	19	23	90
2	(France) Loris Cabirou (France) César Gazeau (France) Aurélien Panis	(Belgium) Boutsen VDS	40	26	18	18	27	9	19	77
3	(Germany) Alex Aka	(Italy) Tresor Attempto Racing	23^{F}	13	16	61†	Ret	Ret^{F}	5	67
4	(United Kingdom) Charles Clark (Brazil) Pedro Ebrahim (United Kingdom) James Kellett	(United Kingdom) Paradine Competition	18	22	34	27	Ret	21	35	61
5	(Ukraine) Ivan Klymenko (Belgium) Lorens Lecertua	(France) Saintéloc Racing	22	Ret	27	33	18	49	20	57
6	(Belgium) Matisse Lismont	(United Kingdom) Steller Motorsport	19	32	19	52	40			47
6	(Belgium) Matisse Lismont	(Belgium) Team WRT						24	50	47
7	(France) Étienne Cheli (Belgium) Gilles Stadsbader	(Belgium) Team WRT	53	8	33	28	24	24	50	46
8	(Italy) Alberto Di Folco	(Italy) Tresor Attempto Racing	23^{F}	13	16	61†	Ret	Ret^{F}		42
8	(Argentina) Ezequiel Pérez Companc	(Italy) Tresor Attempto Racing	23^{F}	13	16	61†	Ret			42
9	(United Kingdom) Lorcan Hanafin	(United Kingdom) Steller Motorsport	19	32	19	52	40	Ret	45	39
10	(Sweden) Gustav Bergström	(Belgium) Team WRT	53	8	33	28	24			38
11	(France) Romain Andriolo (Germany) David Schumacher (Germany) Finn Wiebelhaus	(Germany) HRT Ford Performance	34	19	29	30	35†	20	43	38
12	(United Kingdom) Hugo Cook	(Belgium) Boutsen VDS			18	18	27			31
13	(France) Romain Leroux (Sweden) Oliver Söderström (Ecuador) Mateo Villagómez	(Germany) Walkenhorst Motorsport	42	42	35	29	14	47	Ret^{F}	30
14	(Thailand) Tanart Sathienthirakul (United Kingdom) Aaron Walker	(Germany) GetSpeed	29	47†	68†	68†	Ret	30	17	26
15	(United States) Wyatt Brichacek (Belgium) Lorenzo Donniacuo	(France) Saintéloc Racing			27	33	18			26
16	(Italy) Leonardo Moncini	(Italy) Tresor Attempto Racing						Ret^{F}	5	25
16	(Denmark) Sebastian Øgaard	(Italy) Tresor Attempto Racing							5	25
17	(United Kingdom) Kiern Jewiss	(United Kingdom) Steller Motorsport	19							24
18	(United States) Anthony Bartone (Poland) Karol Basz (Switzerland) Yannick Mettler	(Germany) GetSpeed	43	18	64†	66†	Ret	27	27	22
19	(United Kingdom) James Baldwin (United Kingdom) Tom Fleming (Portugal) Guilherme Oliveira	(United Kingdom) Garage 59						18^{P}	36^{P}	21
20	(France) Pierre-Louis Chovet	(Belgium) Team WRT			33	28	24			20
21	(United Arab Emirates) Federico Al Rifai (Netherlands) Jop Rappange	(Italy) Dinamic GT	55	45†	21	43	30	32	29	20
22	(Switzerland) Lucas Légeret	(France) Saintéloc Racing	22							19
23	(Germany) Tom Kalender	(Germany) GetSpeed			64†	66†	Ret		17	18
24	(Sri Lanka) Eshan Pieris (France) Sébastien Baud	(Italy) Dinamic GT			21	43	30			15
25	(Canada) Daniel Ali	(United Kingdom) Steller Motorsport		32	19	52†	40	Ret	45	15
26	(Germany) Salman Owega	(Germany) HRT Ford Performance			29	30	35†			14
27	(United States) Reece Gold	(France) Saintéloc Racing		Ret				49	20	12
28	(Italy) Michele Beretta (Italy) Alessio Deledda	(Italy) VSR	25^{P}	35	70†	70†	Ret	51	42	12
29	(United States) Phillippe Denes	(Italy) Tresor Attempto Racing			16	61†	Ret			12
30	(Netherlands) Olivier Hart	(United Kingdom) Steller Motorsport			19	52	40			11
31	(United Kingdom) Finlay Hutchison	(Italy) VSR	25^{P}							10
32	(Australia) Jayden Kelly (United Kingdom) Zac Meakin (United Kingdom) Michael O'Brien	(United Kingdom) Greystone GT							24	8
33	(Belgium) Nicolas Baert (United Arab Emirates) Jamie Day (Belgium) Kobe Pauwels	(Belgium) Comtoyou Racing	36	Ret^{P}	62	54	Ret	26	49	8
34	(Netherlands) Maxime Oosten	(United Kingdom) Paradine Competition			34	27	Ret			8
35	(Netherlands) Colin Caresani	(Germany) GetSpeed	29	47†	68†	68†	Ret			6
36	(Netherlands) Dante Rappange	(Austria) GRT - Grasser Racing Team	32	44†	52	36	Ret	50	47	6
36	Ivan Ekelchik (Belgium) Baptiste Moulin	(Austria) GRT - Grasser Racing Team	32	44†	52	36	Ret	50		6
37	(Denmark) Mikkel O. Pedersen	(Italy) Dinamic GT		45†				32	29	5
38	(Netherlands) Lin Hodenius	(Germany) GetSpeed			68†	68†	Ret	30		2
38	(Italy) Andrea Frassineti	(Italy) VSR		35	70†	70†	Ret			2
39	(China) Liang Jiatong	(Austria) GRT - Grasser Racing Team			52	36	Ret			2
40	(Canada) Adam Ali	(United Kingdom) Barwell Motorsport	44	36						1
40	(Canada) Adam Ali	(United Kingdom) Steller Motorsport							45	1
40	(United States) Christian Bogle (United States) Bijoy Garg	(United Kingdom) Barwell Motorsport	44	36						1
–	(Italy) Fabrizio Crestani (Spain) Rafael Durán (South Africa) David Perel	(Germany) Rinaldi Racing						DNS	38	0
–	(France) Edgar Maloigne (France) Maxime Robin (India) Sai Sanjay	(France) CSA Racing	Ret	39	74†	74†	Ret	42	Ret	0
–	(Italy) Mattia Michelotto	(Italy) VSR			70†	70†	Ret		42	0
–	(Spain) Isaac Tutumlu (Austria) Gerhard Tweraser	(Austria) GRT - Grasser Racing Team							47	0
–	(Israel) Artem Petrov	(Italy) VSR						51		0
–	(Netherlands) Xavier Maassen	(Belgium) Comtoyou Racing			62	54	Ret			0
–	(Guatemala) Mateo Llarena	(Italy) Dinamic GT	55							0
–	(United Kingdom) Josh Mason	(France) CSA Racing			74†	74†	Ret			0
–	(United States) Alec Udell	(United States) Steller Motorsport						Ret		0
Pos.	Drivers	Team	LEC (France)	MNZ (Italy)	SPA (Belgium)			NÜR (Germany)	BAR (Spain)	Points
Pos.	Drivers	Team	LEC (France)	MNZ (Italy)	6hrs	12hrs	24hrs	NÜR (Germany)	BAR (Spain)	Points

==== Bronze Cup ====
Pos.	Drivers	Team	LEC (France)	MNZ (Italy)	SPA (Belgium)			NÜR (Germany)	BAR (Spain)	Points
Pos.	Drivers	Team	LEC (France)	MNZ (Italy)	6hrs	12hrs	24hrs	NÜR (Germany)	BAR (Spain)	Points
1	(United States) Dustin Blattner (Denmark) Conrad Laursen (Germany) Dennis Marschall	(Switzerland) Kessel Racing	26	29	10	16	15	Ret^{P}	18	97
2	(Hong Kong) Antares Au (Netherlands) Loek Hartog	(Germany) Rutronik Racing	39	10	66	57	45	35	12^{F}	66
3	(Switzerland) Ricardo Feller (Germany) Patrick Kolb (Italy) Gabriel Rindone	(Germany) Lionspeed GP	38	40^{F}	42	12	21	33	26	62
4	(Germany) Marvin Dienst (Italy) Gabriele Piana; Rinat Salikhov	(United States) Winward Racing	33	14	38	26	17	41	Ret	61
5	(France) Paul Evrard (Belgium) Gilles Magnus (France) Benjamin Ricci	(France) Saintéloc Racing	37	27	41	24	19	37	Ret	48
6	(Canada) Zacharie Robichon	(Switzerland) Kessel Racing			10	16	15			46
7	(Indonesia) Sean Gelael (United Kingdom) Darren Leung	(United Kingdom) Paradine Competition	27	25	46	56	Ret	Ret	26	46
8	(Germany) Ralf Bohn (Germany) Alfred Renauer	(Germany) Herberth Motorsport	35	28	32	23	25	38	Ret	45
8	(Germany) Robert Renauer	(Germany) Herberth Motorsport	35	28	32	23	25	38		45
9	(Netherlands) Morris Schuring	(Germany) Rutronik Racing	39		66	57	45	35	12^{F}	41
10	(Italy) David Fumanelli (Switzerland) Nicolò Rosi (Italy) Niccolò Schirò	(Switzerland) Kessel Racing	31	34	60	48	28	36	Ret^{P}	34
11	(United Kingdom) Tom Fleming (Portugal) Guilherme Oliveira (Portugal) Miguel Ramos	(United Kingdom) Garage 59	54^{P}	17^{P}	49	22	22			34
12	(United Kingdom) Charles Dawson	(Bahrain) 2 Seas Motorsport			56	40	26	31	44	32
13	(Italy) Riccardo Pera	(Germany) Lionspeed GP			42	12	21			28
14	(Netherlands) Daan Arrow	(United States) Winward Racing			38	26	17			27
15	(United Kingdom) Tom Lebbon	(Bahrain) 2 Seas Motorsport						31	44	26
16	(United Kingdom) Ben Barnicoat	(Bahrain) 2 Seas Motorsport						31		25
17	(United States) Reece Gold	(France) Saintéloc Racing			41	24	19			25
18	(United Kingdom) Dan Harper	(United Kingdom) Paradine Competition	27							24
19	(Zimbabwe) Axcil Jefferies	(Germany) Herberth Motorsport			32	23	25			23
20	(Austria) Max Hofer; Andrey Mukovoz; Alexey Nesov	(Germany) Tresor Attempto Racing	50^{F}	Ret	51	63†	Ret^{P}	40	15	21
21	(Belgium) Jef Machiels (Belgium) Louis Machiels	(Italy) AF Corse - Francorchamps Motors	45	20	53	37	33	45	40	19
22	(Qatar) Abdulla Ali Al-Khelaifi (Qatar) Ghanim Salah Al-Maadheed	(Qatar) QMMF by Saintéloc Racing	47	23	65	58	46	44	28	18
23	(Portugal) Miguel Ramos	(United Kingdom) Garage 59	54^{P}	17^{P}						17
24	(United Kingdom) Shaun Balfe (United Kingdom) Jack Hawksworth	(United Kingdom) Garage 59			49	22	22			17
25	(Belgium) Mathieu Detry (Belgium) Fabian Duffieux	(Italy) UNX Racing						34	46	15
26	(Italy) Eddie Cheever III	(United Kingdom) Ziggo Sport - Tempesta	48	37	37	25	50†	Ret	39	15
26	(United Kingdom) Chris Froggatt	(United Kingdom) Ziggo Sport - Tempesta	48	37	37	25	50†		39	15
27	(United Kingdom) Jake Dennis	(United Kingdom) Paradine Competition			46	56	Ret		26	14
28	(Italy) Andrea Bertolini	(Italy) AF Corse - Francorchamps Motors	45	20	53	37	33			13
29	(Italy) Felice Jelmini (Italy) Federico Malvestiti (Brazil) Marcelo Tomasoni	(Italy) BMW Italia Ceccato Racing	Ret	30	57	42	49†	39	32	11
30	(Hong Kong) Jonathan Hui	(United Kingdom) Ziggo Sport - Tempesta		37	37	25	50†			11
30	(Italy) Lorenzo Patrese	(United Kingdom) Ziggo Sport - Tempesta			37	25	50†	Ret		11
31	(Qatar) Ibrahim Al-Abdulghani	(Qatar) QMMF by Saintéloc Racing	47	23	65	58	46	44		10
32	(United Kingdom) Ashley Sutton	(United Kingdom) Paradine Competition		25						8
32	(Germany) Julian Hanses	(Qatar) QMMF by Saintéloc Racing			64	58	46		28	8
33	(United Kingdom) Kiern Jewiss	(Bahrain) 2 Seas Motorsport			56	40	26		44	6
34	(Canada) Parker Thompson (United Kingdom) Lewis Williamson	(Bahrain) 2 Seas Motorsport			56	40	26			6
35	(Italy) Tommaso Mosca	(Italy) AF Corse - Francorchamps Motors			53	37	33	45	40	6
36	(Germany) Christian Hook (South Africa) David Perel (Italy) Davide Rigon	(Germany) Rinaldi Racing	41	38	44	49	41			5
37	(Italy) Daniele Di Amato	(Switzerland) Kessel Racing			60	48	28			4
37	(Italy) Marco Pulcini	(United Kingdom) Ziggo Sport - Tempesta	48					Ret	39	4
38	(Argentina) Marcos Siebert	(Italy) AF Corse - Francorchamps Motors			53	37	33			4
39	(Canada) Adam Ali (United Kingdom) Ricky Collard (United Kingdom) Rob Collard (United States) Bijoy Garg	(United Kingdom) Barwell Motorsport			48	38	34			3
40	(Germany) Felipe Fernández Laser	(Germany) Rinaldi Racing			44	49	41			3
41	(United Kingdom) Toby Sowery	(United Kingdom) Paradine Competition			46	56	Ret			2
42	(Luxembourg) Dylan Pereira	(Italy) Tresor Attempto Racing			51	63†	Ret^{P}			1
–	(United Kingdom) Jessica Hawkins (Belgium) Alexandre Leroy (Belgium) Antoine Potty	(Belgium) Comtoyou Racing	46	WD	71†	71†	Ret	48	48	0
–	(United States) Connor De Phillippi	(Italy) BMW Italia Ceccato Racing			57	42	49†			0
–	(Malaysia) Prince Abu Bakar Ibrahim (Malaysia) Prince Jefri Ibrahim (Australia) Jordan Love (United Kingdom) Alexander Sims	(Malaysia) Johor Motorsports JMR			61	51	43			0
–	(Estonia) Martin Rump	(Germany) Rutronik Racing			66	57	45			0
–	(Mozambique) Rodrigo Almeida	(Belgium) Comtoyou Racing			71†	71†	Ret			0
–	(Denmark) Bastian Buus	(Italy) UNX Racing							46	0
–	(Germany) Tim Heinemann	(Germany) Herberth Motorsport							Ret	0
Pos.	Drivers	Team	LEC (France)	MNZ (Italy)	SPA (Belgium)			NÜR (Germany)	BAR (Spain)	Points
Pos.	Drivers	Team	LEC (France)	MNZ (Italy)	6hrs	12hrs	24hrs	NÜR (Germany)	BAR (Spain)	Points

== See also ==
- 2025 British GT Championship
- 2025 GT World Challenge Europe
- 2025 GT World Challenge Europe Sprint Cup
- 2025 GT World Challenge Asia
- 2025 GT World Challenge America
- 2025 GT World Challenge Australia
- 2025 Intercontinental GT Challenge
