= Simplifydigital =

Private company based in the United Kingdom

Simplifydigital Ltd.
- Company type: Private
- Industry: Retailing
- Founder: Charlie Ponsonby, Lawrence Bleach
- Headquarters: Hammersmith, London
- Area served: UK
- Products: Broadband, Mobile broadband, Digital TV, Home Phone
- Website: www.dixonscarphone.com

Simplifydigital was founded in 2007 by two ex-Sky senior sales and marketing executives, Charlie Ponsonby and Lawrence Bleach. It owns and operates the UK's largest and fastest growing "triple play" (TV, broadband, home phone) comparison sales platform. The platform is used by Simplifydigital's own branded business and by a number of blue chip retail clients who want to offer broadband switching to their customers. These include: Barclays, Currys, Sainsbury, and Compare the Market.

Simplifydigital expanded into the wider home services market in the UK and launched an energy switching app called Voltz, available on Android and iOS, in late 2015. The app allows users to switch energy providers using their mobile. Simplifydigital also planned to launch mobile phone comparison in 2016.

Simplifydigital started Simplify Digital Web Services (SDWS) in 2010, to offer sales and retention SaaS to global TV, broadband, home phone and mobile telco companies faced with increasing pressures to attract and retain customers. SDWS works with TalkTalk, EE, Webhelp and others to provide software "plug-ins" to legacy CRM systems, to help contact centre agents sell and retain customers.

Simplifydigital has received wide recognition for its rapid growth and has been named in the Sunday Times Tech Track 100 and Deloitte Fast 50 in 2013, 2014 and 2015; the GP Bullhound Media Momentum Awards in 2013; the Red Herring Top 100 Europe and Global Top 100 in 2014; and named in the list of 1000 Companies to Inspire Britain in 2015.

In 2016, Simplifydigital was acquired by Dixons Carphone.
