= Tigerspike =

Company

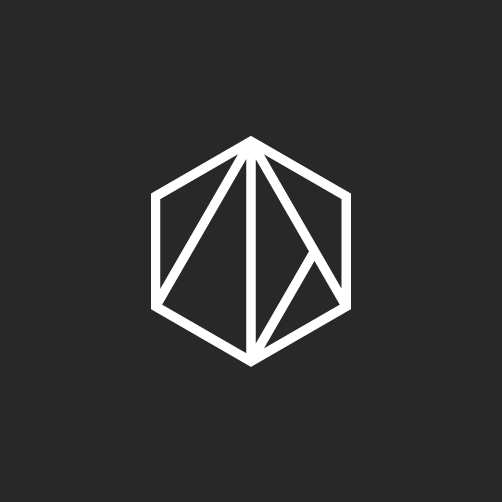
- Industry: Software
- Founded: 2003
- Headquarters: Sydney
- Area served: AMER, APAC, EMEA
- Key people: Neil Davis (Group MD)
- Number of employees: 300+
- Parent: Concentrix Corporation
- Website: https://tigerspike.com/

Tigerspike was a software company headquartered in Sydney. It was founded in 2003 by Luke Janssen, Oliver Palmer, and Dean Jezard. Tigerspike was acquired by Concentrix in 2017, and rebranded as Concentrix Tigerspike in 2020, then Concentrix Catalyst in 2023.

== History ==
Tigerspike was founded in 2003 in Sydney, Australia. In 2008, Tigerspike opened its Innovation Lab, which focuses on new technologies, including encryption and compression. The lab is headed by Oliver Palmer.

In 2011, Tigerspike secured a US$ 11 million investment from Aegis Group. The same year, Tigerspike was featured on Forbes’ list of America’s Most Promising Companies and expanded into Singapore.

Tigerspike released Karacell, a quantum computing encryption technology designed for mobile devices in 2012.

In July 2017, Tigerspike became part of Concentrix, a business services company and a wholly owned subsidiary of SYNNEX Corporation (NYSE: SNX).

In November 2020, Tigerspike announced that it was changing its operating name to Concentrix Tigerspike. As of 2024, Concentrix has removed mention of the Tigerspike brand entirely.

== Products ==
Concentrix Tigerspike has designed and developed applications for print media companies such as The Economist and Haaretz. Their cloud-based service platform is used by clients including Pepsi, Vodafone and the World Wide Fund for Nature. The company also developed the ICSA Blueprint BoardPad app, an enterprise app used for board meetings and agenda for 71 of the FTSE 100 companies.

== See also ==
- Cross Platform
- Service Delivery Platform
- Quantum Cryptography
