= Beaux Arts Magazine =

Monthly French magazine

Beaux Arts Magazine is a monthly French Art Magazine that was founded in 1983. In May 2016, Beaux Arts Magazine was bought by Frédéric Jousset.

== History ==
In 1994, Beaux Arts Magazine was completed by the Beaux Arts éditions entity.

Beaux Arts éditions publishes today around 70 new works each year, addressing the most varied subjects of creation and artistic news: exhibition books devoted to temporary exhibitions, specials dedicated to permanent collections, catalogs, albums, anthologies and books, such as Le Rire de Résistance by Jean-Michel Ribes, 100 masterpieces from the Louvre tell the story of the world of Adrien Goetz, Une histoire de l'art du XXe siècle by Bernard Blistène, The Most Beautiful Texts in the History of Art by Pierre Sterckx or The 100 Most Beautiful Comic Strips by Vincent Bernière.

For several years, Beaux Arts Magazine has forged partnerships with major French institutions and museums, including the Louvre, with which it co-publishes Grande Galerie. I

In October 2017, Beaux Arts Magazine published its 400th issue. For this anniversary, the magazine was increased to cover the visual arts, painting, architecture, design, sculpture, cinema, travel proposals and gastronomy thanks to in his new column "The recipes of art" by Alain Passard. The art market part is the subject of a new specific section. On this occasion, the magazine and the editions had a new graphic charter.

As of 2017, Beaux Arts Magazine had nearly 63,000 copies per issue, 400,000 readers, and 10 million euros of revenue.
