= Audencia Business School =

Grande école and business school, Nantes

Coordinates: 47.2468°N 1.55271°W

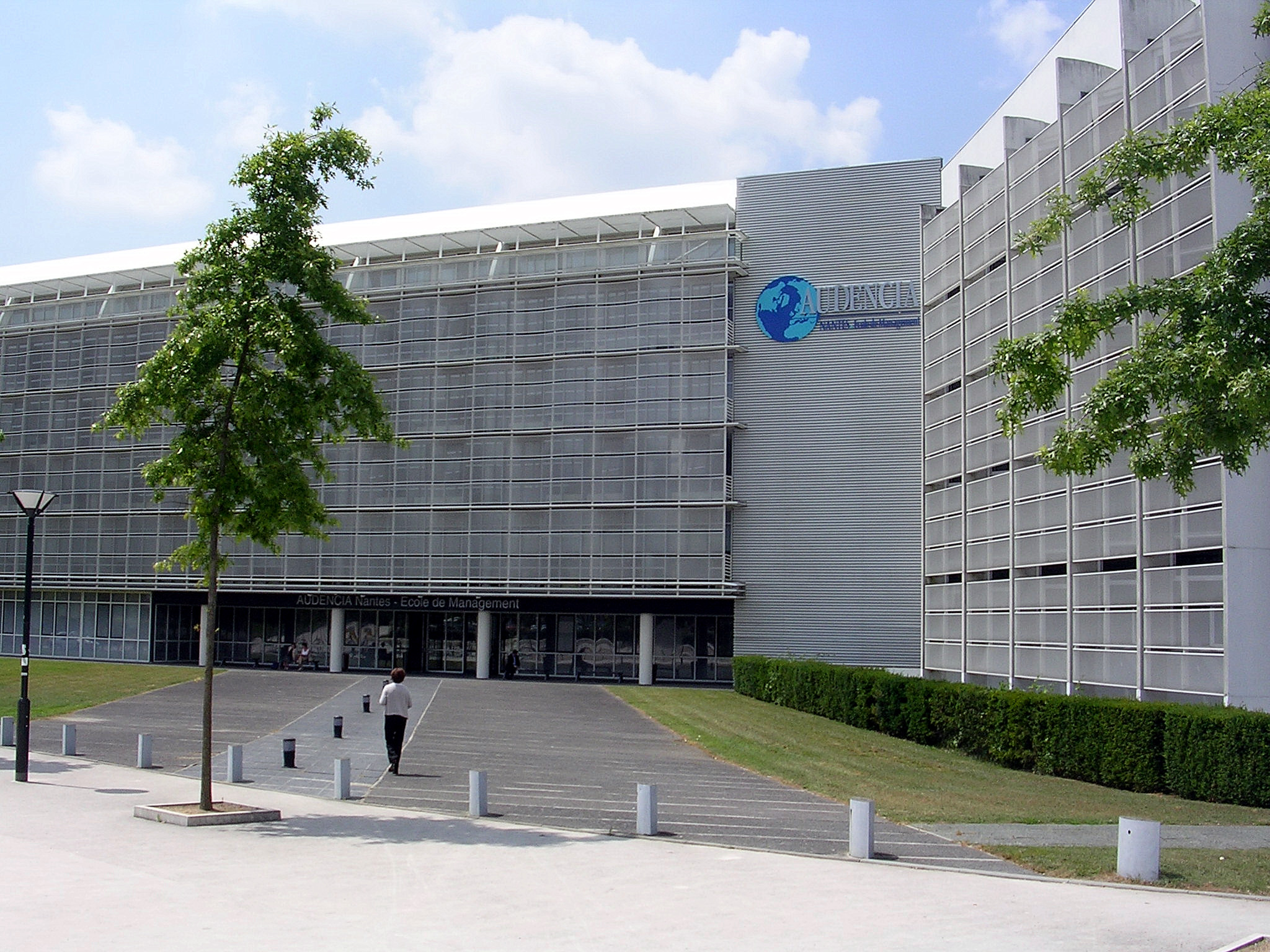
- Former names: Audencia Nantes École de Management
- Motto: Never stop daring
- Type: Grande école de commerce et de management (Private research university Business school)
- Established: 1900; 126 years ago
- Accreditation: Triple accreditation: AACSB; AMBA; EQUIS
- Academic affiliations: Conférence des grandes écoles
- President: Michel Denis
- Dean: Sébastien Tran
- Academic staff: 170; 98% PhD.; 44% female; 66% international
- Students: 7,800
- Location: Nantes, France
- Campus: Nantes, Paris, La Roche-sur-Yon, China, Brazil, Australia, Spain
- Language: English and French
- Website: Official website
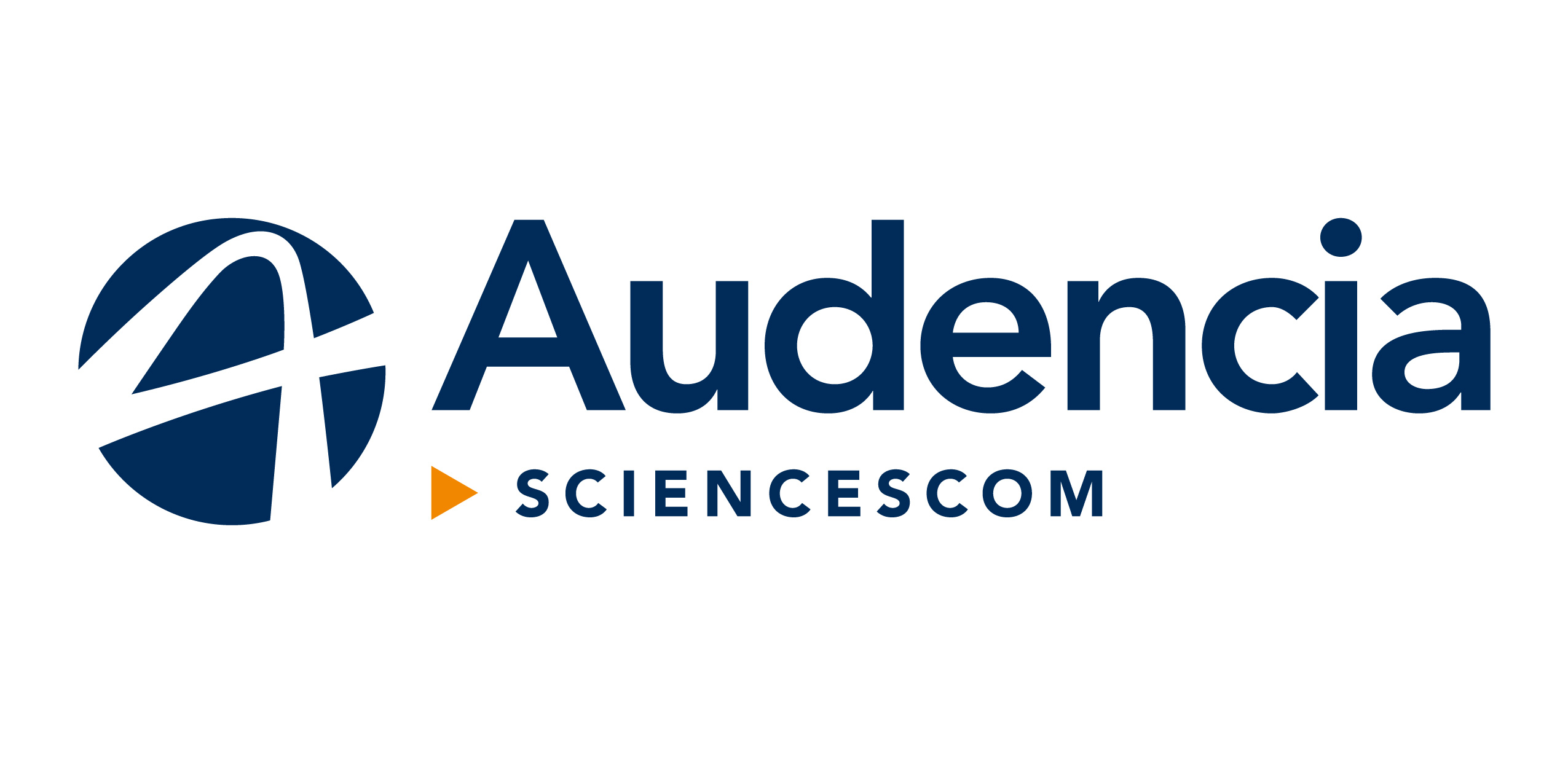

Audencia Business School, Nantes, France

Audencia Business School is a French grande école and business school located in Nantes, France. The school enrolls 7,800 students from almost 90 countries in bachelors, international masters, specialised masters, MBAs, doctorates and executive education courses.

It is one of the only 1% of business schools in the world accredited by the Association of MBAs (AMBA), European Quality Improvement System (EQUIS), and the Association to Advance Collegiate Schools of Business (AACSB). Audencia is also BSIS labelled.

== History ==
Audencia was founded in 1900 as the École Supérieure de Commerce de Nantes. Until 1970, the school occupied the building which is today home to the city's natural history museum. It then moved into a purpose-built campus of 23,000 m^{2} to the north of the city centre opposite Nantes University.

In 2000, the school changed its name to Audencia Nantes School of Management. The name "Audencia" is a blend of two Latin words: audientia, which means "listening," and audacia for "boldness."

Since 2004, the school has been associated with the Global Compact, a United Nations initiative that brings together firms, the business world and civil society united on ten universal principles relative to human rights, working conditions and the environment.

In 2015, the school was reaccredited by the three global accreditations (AMBA, EQUIS, AACSB) for the maximum period of five years.

In 2016, the school changed its name to Audencia Business School which includes the bachelor and masters programmes of former schools SciencesCom and the Ecole Atlantique de Commerce.

In 2017, the school adopted a new legal status and became a public-private partnership (École consulaire or EESC) largely financed by the public Chambers of Commerce in Nantes St-Nazaire.

== Grande école degrees ==
Audencia is an École consulaire (EESC), a private institution of higher education funded and supervised by the city of Nantes, the local council and the chamber of commerce and industry. As a member of the Conférence des grandes écoles, Audencia has the status of a Grande école. Grandes écoles are elite French institutions of higher education that are separate from, but parallel and often connected to, the main framework of the French public university system. Grandes écoles admit students through an extremely competitive process, and a significant proportion of their graduates occupy the highest levels of French society. Similar to Ivy League schools in the United States, Russell Group in the UK, and C9 League in China, graduation from a grande école is considered the prerequisite credential for any top government, administrative and corporate position in France.

The degrees are accredited by the Conférence des Grandes Écoles and awarded by the Ministry of National Education (France). Higher education business degrees in France are organized into three levels thus facilitating international mobility: the Licence / Bachelor's degrees, and the Master's and Doctorate degrees. The Bachelors and the Masters are organized in semesters: 6 for the Bachelors and 4 for the Masters. Those levels of study include various "parcours" or paths based on UE (Unités d'enseignement or Modules), each worth a defined number of European credits (ECTS). A student accumulates those credits, which are generally transferable between paths. A Bachelors is awarded once 180 ECTS have been obtained (bac + 3); a Masters is awarded once 120 additional credits have been obtained (bac +5). The highly coveted PGE (Grand Ecole Program) ends with the degree of Master's in Management (MiM)

Audencia Business School is also accredited by EQUIS (European Quality Improvement System), AACSB (Association to Advance Collegiate Schools of Business) and AMBA (Association of MBAs). It is among the top 1% business school in the world to have the triple crown accreditation (Triple accreditation). Of the 13,670 schools offering business degree programs worldwide, only 89 have triple accreditation as of May 2018.

== Academic programmes ==
=== Bachelor ===
- Bachelor in Management – Three-year programme. Admission possible in year three after prior studies.
- Bachelor of Business Administration (BBA) – Four year programme with the fourth year split between studies and in-company period. Specialisations in agribusiness or purchasing.

=== Master ===
- Audencia Master in Management (Grande école programme) – Four years including one in-company.
- Audencia Full-Time MBA – Taught in English over a 12-month period.
- Executive MBA – 18 months part-time, taught in French, with international seminars in English.
- Euro*MBA – Executive programme run by a consortium of six European business schools including Audencia Nantes. Taught over 24 months through distance learning and six European residential weeks.
- MSc in Management-Engineering – An English-language programme followed by students from around 20 French and foreign engineering schools. An 18-month course with a study period abroad. Ranked 55th in the world in the Financial Times’ masters in management ranking (September 2020).
- European and International Business Management Programme (EIBM) – Trilingual (English, French, Spanish) programme in 12 and 14-month formats taught in three countries. Run by Audencia Nantes and two academic partners in the UK and Spain.
- International Master in Management (IMM) – 1-Year programme taught in English with the possibility of studying on the campus of one of eight exclusive partners.
- Master Supply Chain and Purchasing Management – English-taught double degree split between Audencia Nantes and POLIMI Graduate School of Management (Italy). Available in 12 or 18-month formats.
- MSc in Food and Agribusiness Management – a 15-month programme in partnership with ESPM (Escola Superior de Propaganda e marketing) (Brazil) and with the support of the Crédit Agricole. Taught 100% in English.
- MSc in Management and Entrepreneurship in the Creative Economy (MSc MECE) – an 18-month programme taught in English in partnership with the Innovation School of The Glasgow School of Art (United Kingdom).
- Masters programme Communications and Media – Three-year programme including 15 months of internships.`
- Masters programme Public policy Management – in partnership with Sciences Po Lille
- Specialised masters accredited by the French Conférence des Grandes Ecoles and taught in French: Management of Sports Organisations; Management and International Competences; Marketing Design & Création; Global Purchasing and Supply Chain Management; Finance, Risk, Control; Marketing Strategies for the Digital Age; Business Development

=== Doctorate ===
- DBA Audencia Business School – Toulouse Business School
- DBA in Responsible Management, Audencia Business School – Tsinghua University, Beijing
- DBA Audencia Business School – Western Business School of China, Chengdu

=== Non-degree ===
- Executive Education

== Rankings ==
In 2021, Audencia was ranked 7th business school in France by L'Étudiant. In 2022, the Financial Times ranked its Masters in Management program 47th in the world. Audencia's Full-Time MBA was ranked 58th in the MBA ranking 2018 by CNN Expansion and 90th in the world by The Economist (October 2018).

== Partnerships ==
Within France, Audencia entered an alliance with the École Centrale de Nantes and the Nantes École Nationale Supérieure d’Architecture (ensa Nantes) to promote engineering, management, architecture and creativity to enrich the teaching, research, corporate relations and international scope of all three schools. The school signed its first agreement with a non-French academic institution in 1972. Today, Audencia has more than 230 international partners. While the earliest accords concerned North American business schools (especially those in the USA), the school now has partnerships throughout the world.

- Australia: RMIT University, University of Adelaide
- Austria: MCI Management Center Innsbruck
- Belgium: Solvay Brussels School of Economics and Management, KU Leuven
- Canada: HEC Montréal, Queens University, Université Laval, University of Ottawa, University of Victoria
- China: Beijing Institute of Technology, Southwestern University of Finance and Economics, The Hong Kong Polytechnic University
- Colombia: University of the Andes (Colombia), Universidad Externado de Colombia
- Finland: Aalto University School of Business
- Germany: WHU – Otto Beisheim School of Management, HHL Leipzig Graduate School of Management, Kühne Logistics University (KLU), FOM University of Applied Sciences, University of Freiburg
- India: Indian Institute of Management Bangalore, XLRI - Xavier School of Management, Institute of Management Technology, Ghaziabad, Indian Institute of Management Kozhikode, Indian Institute of Management Raipur
- Ireland: UCD Quinn School of Business
- Italy: MIP Politecnico di Milano, Università Commerciale Luigi Bocconi, LIUC Università Carlo Cattaneo, LUISS Guido Carli
- Japan: Nagoya University
- Korea: Kyungpook National University
- Netherlands: Maastricht University, Rotterdam School of Management, Erasmus University
- New Zealand: University of Canterbury
- Poland: Kozminski University
- Portugal: Católica Lisbon School of Business & Economics, Nova School of Business and Economics
- Russia: Higher School of Economics, Saint Petersburg State University Graduate School of Management
- Spain: Universidad Carlos III de Madrid, EADA Business School
- Sweden: University of Gothenburg
- United Kingdom: Aston Business School, Cardiff Business School, Strathclyde Business School, Loughborough University, University of Exeter
- United States: University of California, Berkeley, Boston University, Bowling Green State University

== Alumni ==
Audencia Business School has several alumni as follows:

- Othman El Ferdaous: former Minister of culture, youth, and sports of Morocco; Vice president of growth at ABA Technology.
- Jean Arthuis: French Politician.
- Olivier Duha: Founder, Chairman & CEO of Webhelp

== Controversy ==
In 2022 several articles in the Press appeared indicating an organisation of Toxic and Sexist Management leading up to several people leaving their functions, first the Associate Dean, and finally the Dean, Christophe Germain. At least 47 testimonies from the inside reported on stress, press, manipulation, burn-outs high sick-leaves and turn-over of employees, non-application of workers rights.
