= Frédéric Jousset =

French entrepreneur and sponsor (born 1970)

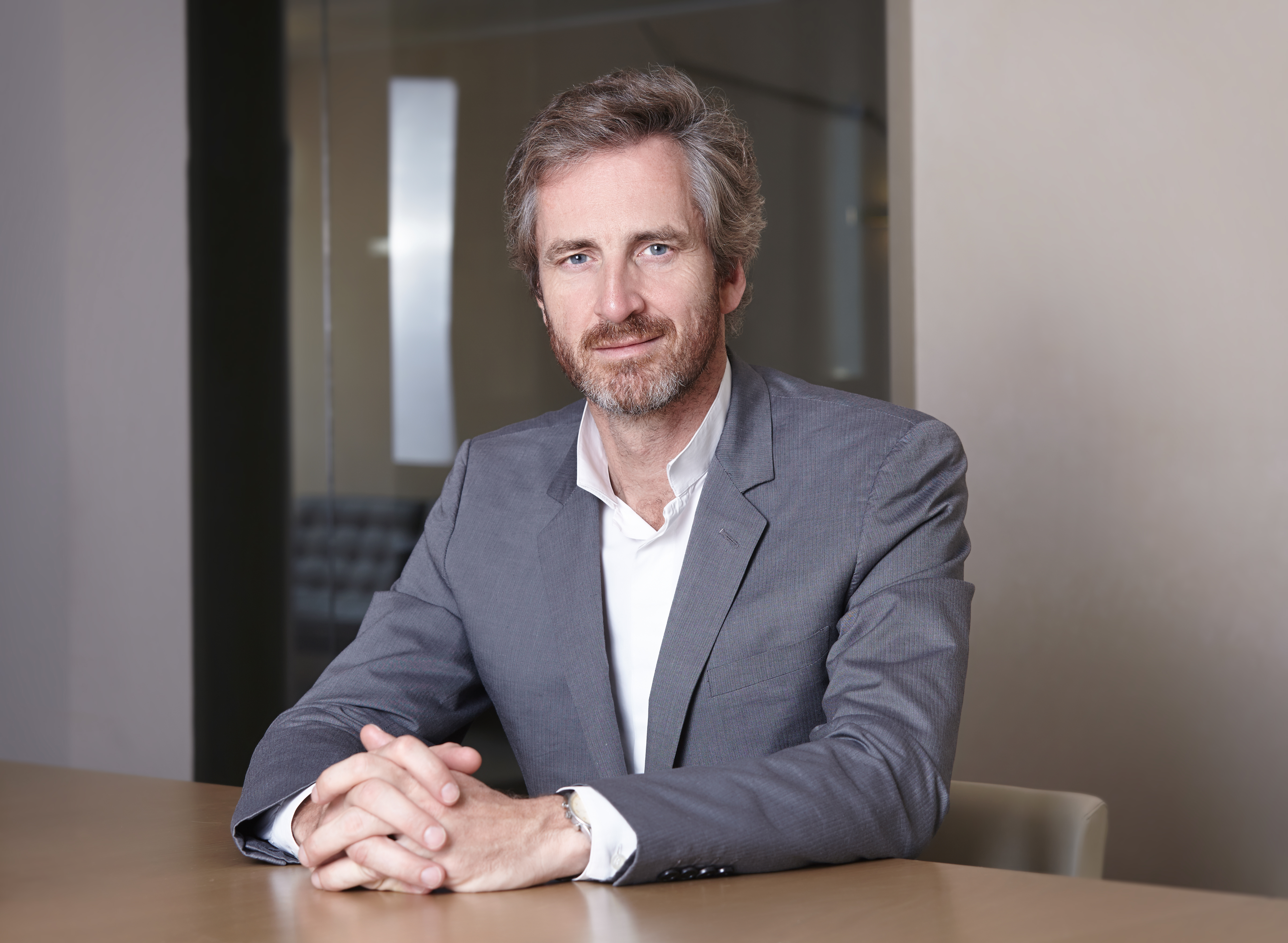
- Jousset in 2015
- Born: Frédéric André Jousset; 3 May 1970 (age 56)
- Education: HEC Paris
- Occupations: Businessperson; Philanthropist; President of Compagnie Financière Jousset (CFJ); Racing driver
- Categorisation: FIA Bronze
- Known for: Co-founder of Webhelp

Frédéric André Jousset (born 3 May 1970) is a French entrepreneur, philanthropist and racing driver. He co-founded Webhelp in 2000 and sold it to Concentrix in 2023 on a $4.8 billion valuation. Patron of the arts, he created the foundation Art Explora and its investing arm ArtNova in 2019 and runs the Compagnie Financière Jousset (CFJ) which finances companies in the industrial, technology or service industry.

== Early life ==
Jousset is the son of Marie-Laure Jousset, Chief Curator at Beaubourg, and Hubert Jousset, President of the GEFIP and the École normale de musique. Jousset graduated from HEC in 1992. During his military service, he was second lieutenant for the 6th Marine Infantry Parachute Regiment. He is the brother of the journalist Alexandra Jousset.

== Career ==
Jousset began his career in 1994 for Kérastase, a division of L'Oréal. In 1998, he founded his first company, Clientis SA, a software publisher for beauty salons. He then joined the American strategy consulting firm Bain & Company where he worked as a strategy consultant. In June 2000, he co-founded Webhelp SA with Olivier Duha, initially offering IT support services and later expanding into operating call centers and outsourcing business services.

In 2014, Jousset obtained a 50-year concession for the Relais de Chambord hotel located in front of the Château de Chambord. He called upon the architect Jean-Michel Wilmotte for the complete renovation. The hotel reopened in March 2018 with 55 rooms, suites, and a gourmet restaurant. Frédéric Jousset bought Beaux Arts Magazine in 2016 and Le Quotidien de l'art in 2017. In 2018, the Minister of Culture Françoise Nyssen entrusted him with the steering of the working group linked to the culture pass for young people.

In 2020, Jousset stepped down from his executive position at Webhelp, but remained vice-president of the board. In 2023, he sold Webhelp to Concentrix in a deal that valued his company at $4.8 billion. He bought the agrofood group Bio Conquête in 2022 and renamed it Quaterra in 2024 after acquiring the French chicken producer Ducs de Gascogne. In 2024, his holding Compagnie Financière Jousset took over the waterproofing manufacturer SMAC. In 2025, Compagnie Financière Jousset acquired 25% of Karavel which controls the travel companies FRAM and Promovacances. In 2026, he opened the Relais d'Amboise, a 5-star hotel located in Amboise along the Loire river in France.

== Art patronage ==
A patron of the Musée du Louvre, Frédéric Jousset became a member of the museum's patronage council, and a member of the Acquisitions Commission of the Musée du Louvre from 2007 to 2014. Through Webhelp, he contributed to the acquisition of Poussin's "The Flight Into Egypt". From 2016 to 2023, he was administrator of the Musée du Louvre by decree of the Minister of Culture.

In 2019, Jousset launched the foundation Art Explora with the goal to open up the world of art to a wider audience. He also launched ArtNova, a 100-million euros fund to invest in the cultural ecosystem, with a special interest in art tech. ArtNova's profits finance the projects and programs of the Art Explora foundation. Jousset's previous investments (Beaux Arts Magazine, Le Quotidien de l'Art, Les Relais de Chambord) were consolidated within ArtNova's portfolio.

In 2021, Jousset announced the construction of a super-large catamaran, the first museum-boat to sail the oceans. A small model of the ship was on exhibit in the France Pavilion during the Expo 2020 in Dubai. The ship - a 47.7-meter wide and 56-meter high catamaran named Art Explorer - was moored in March 2024 in Venice during the 60th Venice Biennale.

The Art Explora & Académie des Beaux-Arts European Prize was launched in 2020 to support innovative cultural programs (150,000 euros awarded annually). Art Explora launched an arts residency program in 2021 in Paris, and financed several mobile museum programs in partnership with the Centre Pompidou in France and the Tate in the UK. In 2023, the foundation inaugurated the Y Hangar, the earliest surviving airship hangar in the world that was transformed into a contemporary art center.

In May 2025, Jousset launched the "Time Odyssey" initiative through his non-profit organization Art Explora, with the goal of funding 100,000 museum visits for schoolchildren across the United Kingdom, addressing the decline in educational trips due to budget constraints and promoting access to culture for students from underprivileged backgrounds. In 2025, the foundation launched the movie trucks CinéMo, touring France to bring cinema to remote areas.

== Other roles ==
- Colonel of the citizen reserve of the French Air and Space Force
- 2011-2014: Chairman of the board of directors of the École nationale supérieure des beaux-arts
- 2018-2022: Chairman of the alumni association of HEC Paris, then Honorary Chairman since 2021
- 2019-2023: Chairman of the École Nationale Supérieure des Arts Décoratifs
- Since 2026: Member of the patronage committee of the Grand Chancellery of the Legion of Honour
- Member of Croissance Plus, the Founders Forum, and the association Le Siècle

== Published work ==
- Jousset, Frédéric (2026). Eau, l'air et l'art [Water, air and art] (in French). Gallimard. ISBN 9782073126351.

== Distinctions ==
- 2007: Medal of Grand Donor by Ministry of Culture and Communication
- 2008: Commander of the Order of Order of Ouissam Alaouite of the kingdom of Morocco
- 2012: Mercury of Honour for Business Creation at HEC, with Olivier Duha
- 2013: Manager of the Year by Nouvel Économiste/Financial Times.
- 2014: Commander of the Ordre des Arts et des Lettres (14 July 2014 - France), Chevalier in 2008
- 2019: Knight of the Legion of Honour
- 2025: Officer of the Ordre national du Mérite (Knight since 2010)
- 2025: Great Star of Public Gratitude of Republic of Albania
- 2025: Knight of the Order of St. Gregory the Great
