= Olivier Duha =

French entrepreneur

- Education: ESCEM and Audencia
- Occupations: Founder, Chairman & CEO of Webhelp

Olivier Duha is a French entrepreneur. He is the founder and co-chairman of Webhelp, an international company specialising in business process outsourcing and client relationship management.

== Biography ==
Duha studied at ESCEM (School of Business and Management) and the Audencia Nantes School of Management. He started his career in 1992 at LEK Consulting, on the advisory council on strategy and mergers/acquisitions. In this role he worked in London, Paris and Sydney.

In 1998, he obtained an MBA at INSEAD. Afterwards, he joined the American consulting firm Bain & Company.

In June 2000, he co-founded Webhelp with Frédéric Jousset, a former colleague from Bain & Company. The companyś original aim was to offer online assistance services for novice internet users, using expert consultants and tailored research tools.

The firm expanded to include global contact centres, hotlines, telemarketing and mail services. Today, Webhelp employs more than 100,000 people in over 50 countries, including France, Morocco, Algeria, Romania, Belgium, Madagascar, the United Kingdom, South Africa, the Netherlands, India, Portugal, Italy and Germany.

== Published books ==
- Duha, Olivier (2022). Think human: La révolution de l'expérience client à l'heure du digital (in French). Eyrolles.

== Distinctions and awards ==
- June 2010: Knight of the National Order of Merit (France)
