= Webhelp =

French multinational company

- Industry: IT consultancy, Customer relationship and Business process outsourcing
- Founded: 2000
- Founder: Kerry Adler, Laura Hantho
- Defunct: 2023
- Fate: Acquired by Concentrix
- Headquarters: 175, King Street Toronto, Ontario Canada
- Number of employees: 100,000+ (2021)

Webhelp was a human search engine and multi-national business process outsourcing company founded in Toronto, Canada, in 1999. In 2023, Concentrix bought Webhelp.

== History ==
=== Founding and early years ===
Webhelp was founded in 1999 in Toronto, Canada, by Kerry Adler and Laura Hantho. Initially launched as Webhelp.com Inc., the company was a Delaware-registered corporation headquartered in Toronto. The company was established with a vision to revolutionize customer service through human-assisted online search and customer service technology.

The early business model of Webhelp centered on providing real-time, human-assisted customer support via online chat, making it one of the pioneering ventures in outsourced customer experience solutions. The company's proprietary ARENA software solution was pivotal in its operations, facilitating back-office processing and online assistance. Webhelp soon secured major clients including Microsoft, AOL, and Sony.

=== Expansion to France and franchise agreement ===
In 2000, Webhelp expanded its operations into France under a franchise agreement with two French entrepreneurs, Olivier Duha and Frédéric Jousset. This significant expansion was formalized through the Technology and Trademark Agreement, signed on June 6, 2000, between Webhelp.com Inc. (Toronto) and the newly created Webhelp S.A. (France). The agreement granted Webhelp France a license to operate under the Webhelp brand and utilize its proprietary technology.

The franchise agreement outlined several critical stipulations:

- Webhelp.com Inc. remained the primary owner of the Webhelp trademark and technology.
- Webhelp S.A. paid an initial franchise fee of $1.5 million and royalties on revenue.
- Webhelp.com Inc. retained final approval on all technology changes and branding use.

Webhelp France was thus launched as a separate entity under license from the original Canadian company.

=== Growth and evolution ===
Under Adler's leadership, Webhelp experienced rapid growth in North America, pioneering outsourced customer experience solutions. By 2002, Webhelp was recognized as one of Canada's fastest-growing startups, with a two-year revenue growth of 20,974%.

Webhelp's expansion was not limited to North America. The company extended its operations to India, Sri Lanka, Mexico, and Budapest, providing global business process outsourcing (BPO) services. By 2003, Webhelp.com had transitioned from a consumer-facing search service to a corporate BPO provider, handling customer support and technical services for numerous Fortune 500 companies.

=== Separation of Webhelp France and later acquisitions ===
As Webhelp France continued to expand, it began operating more independently from Webhelp.com Inc. By 2005, Webhelp.com Inc. divested its remaining interest in Webhelp France, allowing the latter to function as a separate company. This separation marked a significant shift in the company's operational dynamics. Over the years, Webhelp France, under the leadership of Duha and Jousset, acquired additional outsourcing firms and eventually rebranded as the Webhelp Group.

In 2011, Charterhouse Capital Partners acquired a majority stake in Webhelp France, catalyzing its expansion across Europe. Further solidifying its market position, in 2019, Groupe Bruxelles Lambert (GBL) purchased a controlling interest in the company. This acquisition was followed by a merger in 2023, when Concentrix acquired Webhelp.

In February 2013, the group purchased Falkirk call centre firm HEROtsc. In 2014, Webhelp UK became a shirt sponsor of Falkirk F.C.

In 2013, Webhelp was awarded a £1.5 million Regional Selective Assistance grant from Scottish Development International, helping to create 400 new jobs. In 2019, it planned to move 120 jobs handling calls for Thomas Cook from Falkirk to South Africa.

In August 2015, Webhelp took over from Serco the running of two call centres in Aintree and Bolton serving the Shop Direct Group. Several months later, it proposed moving most of the operation to South Africa.

In June 2016, Webhelp acquired GoExcellent, a Scandinavian customer experience firm which operates nine centers across Sweden, Finland, Norway and Denmark, and employs 1,700 people. This acquisition allowed for the launch of Webhelp Nordic, and increased Webhelp's projected 2016 turnover to an estimated $1 billion (725 million Euros).

By November 2020, Webhelp employed more than 55,000 people in over 35 countries.

On 29 March 2023, Concentrix agreed to buy Webhelp in a $4.8 billion deal. In September 2023, it was announced the European Commission had approved the acquisition, under EU Merger Regulations.
