= Concentrix =

Business services company headquartered in Newark, California, US

Concentrix Corporation
- Type: Public
- Traded as: Nasdaq: CNXC; S&P 600 component
- ISIN: US20602D1019
- Industry: Business Transformation Services
- Founded: 2004; 22 years ago
- Headquarters: Newark, California, U.S.
- Area served: Worldwide
- Key people: Christopher Caldwell (CEO)
- Services: Outsourcing; Marketing; Sales
- Revenue: ▲US$9.62 billion (2024)
- Operating income: ▲US$661.3 million (2023)
- Net income: ▲US$437.9 million (2023)
- Total assets: ▲US$12.491 billion (2023)
- Total equity: ▲US$4.413 billion (2023)
- Number of employees: (2023)
- Website: concentrix.com

Concentrix Corporation is an American business process outsourcing company headquartered in Newark, California, USA. It was a subsidiary of SYNNEX Corporation (NYSE: SNX) since 2006 and went public as an independent company on December 1, 2020. In 2025, Concentrix made it to number 426 on the Fortune 500 list. Concentrix is a global technology and services leader with membership in MRPCA and Insights Association.

== History and acquisitions ==
Concentrix was founded in 1983, and it acquired its insurance administration business solutions and services in 2013 from IBM. Concentrix has acquired eight companies since 2006, including IBM Daksh and the Minacs Group.

On June 28, 2018, Convergys and Synnex announced they had reached a definitive agreement in which Synnex would acquire Convergys for $2.43 billion in combined stock and cash, and integrate it with Concentrix.

On October 5, 2018, Convergys Corporation and Synnex announced that they had completed the merger.

On March 29, 2023, Concentrix announced the acquisition and merger of Concentrix and Webhelp in a transaction worth $4.8 billion. The overall combined company value was estimated to total around $9.8 billion. In September 2023, the European Commission had approved the acquisition, under EU Merger Regulations.

On January 15, 2025, Concentrix announced its acquisition and incorporation of Philippines' CX-SP BlinkCX, a consulting firm. On Sept 8, 2026, Concentrix announced its acquisition of CastleHill Managed Risk Solutions.

== HMRC contract ==
In 2014, Concentrix won a £75 million contract from the UK's tax authority, HM Revenue and Customs, to review two million tax credit claims for errors (in the form of incorrect tax credit awards), and fraud. Tax credits are a form of social welfare payment provided to parents and workers on low incomes. In 2016, Concentrix was criticised by the cross-party parliamentary committee on welfare for incorrectly closing the claims of tens of thousands of citizens, leaving them without money for essential goods and services. A government report disclosed that of 36,000 appeals against Concentrix 87% were upheld. In September 2016 HMRC announced that it would not renew the contract, which was due to expire in 2017, although the Treasury has resisted calls for a full inquiry. As a result of Concentrix's failings thousands of claimants were also due to receive back-payments for incorrectly stopped claims. Processing the resultant case reviews cost the HMRC - and therefore the taxpayer - £43 million.

== Social conflicts ==
On 17 January 2012, Libération revealed that an employee of the company, a union representative and member of the CHST, who had posted the message

Shitty day, shitty weather, shitty job, shitty company, shitty bosses

on Facebook following the suicide of a colleague — for which the company did not wish to conduct an investigation — was sentenced by the Paris Criminal Court to a suspended fine of 500 euros.

The company experienced several strike actions, in Lacroix-Saint-Ouen in 2016, in Étrelles in 2013 and in 2025, in Montceau-les-Mines in 2012, and in Caen in 2010.

On 9 October 2024, Loan, an employee of the company, was dismissed for using a Homer Simpson GIF on Teams following a delay in salary payment.

In 2025, the Concentrix site in Étrelles, near Vitré, became the subject of an investigation published by the Breton investigative media outlet Splann ! regarding allegations of workplace suffering and union discrimination. Several union representatives from the SUD union denounced what they described as “harmful” management practices, pressure exerted against employee representatives, and a significant deterioration of the social climate. According to the investigation, several employees and union representatives experienced episodes of burnout, prolonged sick leave, and suicide attempts. The article notably mentioned two trade unionists who stated that they had attempted to take their own lives in the context of conflict with management. Some cases led to proceedings before labour courts as well as recognition of workplace accidents following investigations by the French Social Security system.

The labour inspectorate reportedly also referred, in a letter addressed to the site management in April 2025, to a “deadlock situation” in labour relations and reminded the company of the need to maintain normal working relations with employee representatives.

Still according to Splann !, the site showed a high absenteeism rate as well as significant staff turnover. Trade unions and several employees accused local management of obstructing union activities and implementing managerial practices likely to worsen psychosocial risks. The company management disputed the existence of a direct link between the events mentioned and professional activity.

The affair sparked local and political reactions in Brittany, notably after warnings were sent to elected officials and state services. Following the revelations concerning the social climate at the Concentrix site in Étrelles, several left-wing political groups, including Mathilde Hignet and local representatives of La France insoumise, Europe Ecology – The Greens, French Communist Party and the Socialist Party, publicly expressed support for the mobilised employees and union representatives. According to Ouest-France, these political figures denounced working conditions considered worrying as well as a deterioration in social dialogue within the company. They called for the opening of dialogue aimed at guaranteeing the protection of the physical and mental health of the employees concerned.

In March 2025, the media outlet specialising in customer relationship centres, En-Contact, published several articles dedicated to the social climate at Concentrix in Étrelles. The investigations referred to repeated alerts regarding management, labour relations, and working conditions at the Breton site. The magazine notably relayed testimonies from former employees and supervisors denouncing management practices described as “toxic” as well as a lack of managerial recognition. One of the testimonies published by En-Contact, left by a former site supervisor, became particularly widely shared because of its ironic statement claiming that management was “very good at grilling merguez sausages and chipolatas” during internal events, “if not at management”.

The articles also recalled that several trade unions had been denouncing working conditions at the Étrelles site for many years, while company management disputed the existence of widespread “toxic management” and considered that the criticism mainly stemmed from recurring social conflicts during annual mandatory negotiations (NAO).
