= 2025 24 Hours of Spa =

78th 24 Hours of Spa endurance race

(Belgium) 2025 24 Hours of Spa
Event information
- Round 3 of 5 in the 2025 Intercontinental GT Challenge; Round 3 of 5 in the 2025 GT World Challenge Europe Endurance Cup
- Date: 26–29 June 2025
- Location: Spa-Francorchamps, Wallonia, Belgium
- Venue: Circuit de Spa-Francorchamps
- Duration: 24 Hours

Results
- Laps completed: 549
- Distance: 3,845.2 km (2,389.3 mi)

Pole position
- Time: 2:15.113
- Team: (United Kingdom) Garage 59
- Drivers: (Germany) Marvin Kirchhöfer

Winners
- Time: 24:00:53.808
- Team: (Austria) GRT - Grasser Racing Team
- Drivers: (Italy) Mirko Bortolotti (Germany) Luca Engstler (South Africa) Jordan Pepper

The 2025 24 Hours of Spa (also known as the CrowdStrike 24 Hours of Spa due to sponsorship reasons) was the 78th running of the 24 Hours of Spa. The race took place from 28 to 29 June 2025. The race was part of both the 2025 GT World Challenge Europe Endurance Cup and the 2025 Intercontinental GT Challenge.

== Background ==
Supporting the race weekend was the GT4 European Series, GT2 European Series, McLaren Trophy Europe, as well as Lamborghini Super Trofeo Europe.

== Entry list ==
A record breaking 76-car field listed for the race — 21 in Pro class, 12 in Gold Cup, 17 in Silver Cup, 19 in Bronze Cup and 7 in Pro-Am Cup. 10 manufacturers were represented, with 11 BMW cars, 11 Mercedes cars, 11 Porsche cars, 9 Ferrari cars, 8 Aston Martin cars, 7 McLaren cars, 6 Audi cars, 6 Lamborghini cars, 2 Ford cars, and the debut for the Chevrolet Corvette Z06 GT3.R with 3 cars listed. The field dropped to 75 entries with Steller Motorsport withdrawing the No. 424 from the event.

No.	Entrant	Car	Driver 1	Driver 2	Driver 3	Driver 4
Pro (21 entries)
00	(Japan) Goodsmile Racing	Mercedes-AMG GT3 Evo	(Japan) Tatsuya Kataoka	(Japan) Kamui Kobayashi	(Japan) Nobuteru Taniguchi	
7	(Belgium) Comtoyou Racing	Aston Martin Vantage AMR GT3 Evo	(Italy) Mattia Drudi	(Denmark) Marco Sørensen	(Denmark) Nicki Thiim	
9	(Belgium) Boutsen VDS	Mercedes-AMG GT3 Evo	(Germany) Maximilian Götz	(Canada) Mikaël Grenier	(Belgium) Maxime Martin	
17	(Germany) Mercedes-AMG Team GetSpeed	Mercedes-AMG GT3 Evo	(Andorra) Jules Gounon	(Germany) Fabian Schiller	(Germany) Luca Stolz	
18	(Italy) Dinamic GT	Porsche 911 GT3 R (992)	(Denmark) Bastian Buus	(Australia) Matt Campbell	(France) Mathieu Jaminet	
22	(France) Schumacher CLRT	Porsche 911 GT3 R (992)	(Austria) Klaus Bachler	(Turkey) Ayhancan Güven	(Germany) Laurin Heinrich	
31	(Belgium) Team WRT	BMW M4 GT3 Evo	(South Africa) Sheldon van der Linde	(Belgium) Dries Vanthoor	(Germany) Marco Wittmann	
32	(Belgium) Team WRT	BMW M4 GT3 Evo	(South Africa) Kelvin van der Linde	(Belgium) Charles Weerts	(Belgium) Ugo de Wilde	
34	(Germany) Walkenhorst Motorsport	Aston Martin Vantage AMR GT3 Evo	(Portugal) Henrique Chaves	(Norway) Christian Krognes	(United Kingdom) David Pittard	
46	(Belgium) Team WRT	BMW M4 GT3 Evo	(Denmark) Kevin Magnussen	(Germany) René Rast	(Italy) Valentino Rossi	
48	(United States) Mercedes-AMG Team Mann-Filter	Mercedes-AMG GT3 Evo	(Austria) Lucas Auer	(Italy) Matteo Cairoli	(Germany) Maro Engel	
50	(Italy) AF Corse - Francorchamps Motors	Ferrari 296 GT3	(Italy) Eliseo Donno	(Italy) Antonio Fuoco	(Monaco) Arthur Leclerc	
51	(Italy) AF Corse - Francorchamps Motors	Ferrari 296 GT3	(Monaco) Vincent Abril	(Italy) Alessandro Pier Guidi	(Italy) Alessio Rovera	
59	(United Kingdom) Garage 59	McLaren 720S GT3 Evo	(Germany) Benjamin Goethe	(Germany) Marvin Kirchhöfer	(United Kingdom) Joseph Loake	
63	(Austria) GRT - Grasser Racing Team	Lamborghini Huracán GT3 Evo 2	(Italy) Mirko Bortolotti	(Germany) Luca Engstler	(South Africa) Jordan Pepper	
64	(Germany) HRT Ford Performance	Ford Mustang GT3	(France) Thomas Drouet	(India) Arjun Maini	(United Kingdom) Jann Mardenborough	
96	(Germany) Rutronik Racing	Porsche 911 GT3 R (992)	(Germany) Sven Müller	(Switzerland) Patric Niederhauser	(Belgium) Alessio Picariello	
98	(Germany) ROWE Racing	BMW M4 GT3 Evo	(Brazil) Augusto Farfus	(Finland) Jesse Krohn	(Switzerland) Raffaele Marciello	
163	(Italy) VSR	Lamborghini Huracán GT3 Evo 2	(Italy) Marco Mapelli	(United Kingdom) Sandy Mitchell	(France) Franck Perera	
911	(Lithuania) Pure Rxcing	Porsche 911 GT3 R (992)	(Austria) Richard Lietz	(United Kingdom) Alex Malykhin (Note: Malykhin is Belarusian, but he competes under a British licence as Belarusian national emblems were banned by the FIA following the Russian invasion of Ukraine.)	(Austria) Thomas Preining	
998	(Germany) ROWE Racing	BMW M4 GT3 Evo	(Austria) Philipp Eng	(United Kingdom) Dan Harper	(Germany) Max Hesse	
Gold (12 entries)
5	(United Kingdom) Optimum Motorsport	McLaren 720S GT3 Evo	(Denmark) Largim Ali	(Australia) James Allen	(United Kingdom) Ollie Millroy	(United Kingdom) Mikey Porter
23	(United Kingdom) Team RJN	McLaren 720S GT3 Evo	(Republic of Ireland) Reece Barr	(United Kingdom) Alex Buncombe	(Germany) Ben Dörr	(United Kingdom) Tommy Foster
33	(Netherlands) Verstappen.com Racing	Aston Martin Vantage AMR GT3 Evo	(United Kingdom) Harry King	(United Kingdom) Chris Lulham	(Netherlands) Thierry Vermeulen	
57	(United States) Winward Racing	Mercedes-AMG GT3 Evo	(Netherlands) Indy Dontje	(Switzerland) Philip Ellis	(Canada) Daniel Morad	(United States) Russell Ward
58	(United Kingdom) Garage 59	McLaren 720S GT3 Evo	(United Kingdom) Dean MacDonald	(Monaco) Louis Prette	(Denmark) Frederik Schandorff	(United Kingdom) Adam Smalley
88	(Italy) Tresor Attempto Racing	Audi R8 LMS Evo II	(Italy) Riccardo Cazzaniga	(Italy) Rocco Mazzola	(Italy) Leonardo Moncini	(Denmark) Sebastian Øgaard
92	(Germany) Herberth Motorsport	Porsche 911 GT3 R (992)	(Germany) Tim Heinemann	(Switzerland) Rolf Ineichen	(Germany) Joel Sturm	
111	(France) CSA Racing	McLaren 720S GT3 Evo	(France) Simon Gachet	(United Kingdom) James Kell	(France) Jim Pla	(France) Arthur Rougier
120	(United States) Wright Motorsports	Porsche 911 GT3 R (992)	(United States) Adam Adelson	(Australia) Tom Sargent	(United States) Elliott Skeer	
333	(Germany) Paul Motorsport	Lamborghini Huracán GT3 Evo 2	(Italy) Marzio Moretti	(Germany) Maximilian Paul	(Poland) Robin Rogalski	(United States) John Paul Southern Jr.
611	(Germany) Nordique Racing	Mercedes-AMG GT3 Evo	(Japan) Kazuto Kotaka	(Italy) Edoardo Liberati	(Japan) Yuichi Nakayama	(Germany) Tim Sandtler
777	(Oman) AlManar Racing by WRT	BMW M4 GT3 Evo	(Oman) Al Faisal Al Zubair	(Germany) Jens Klingmann	(United Kingdom) Ben Tuck	(United States) Neil Verhagen
Silver (17 entries)
3	(Germany) GetSpeed	Mercedes-AMG GT3 Evo	(United States) Anthony Bartone	(Poland) Karol Basz	(Germany) Tom Kalender	(Switzerland) Yannick Mettler
6	(Germany) GetSpeed	Mercedes-AMG GT3 Evo	(Netherlands) Colin Caresani	(Netherlands) Lin Hodenius	(Thailand) Tanart Sathienthirakul	(United Kingdom) Aaron Walker
10	(Belgium) Boutsen VDS	Mercedes-AMG GT3 Evo	(France) Loris Cabirou	(United Kingdom) Hugo Cook	(France) César Gazeau	(France) Aurélien Panis
19	(Austria) GRT - Grasser Racing Team	Lamborghini Huracán GT3 Evo 2	Ivan Ekelchik (Note: Ekelchik, Mukovoz and Nesov are Russian, but they compete as neutral competitors as Russian national emblems were banned by the FIA following the Russian invasion of Ukraine. Salikhov, also a Russian, competes under an Armenian licence for the same reason.)	(China) Liang Jiatong	(Belgium) Baptiste Moulin	(Netherlands) Dante Rappange
21	(Belgium) Comtoyou Racing	Aston Martin Vantage AMR GT3 Evo	(Belgium) Nicolas Baert	(United Arab Emirates) Jamie Day	(Netherlands) Xavier Maassen	(Belgium) Kobe Pauwels
24	(United Kingdom) Steller Motorsport	Chevrolet Corvette Z06 GT3.R	(Canada) Daniel Ali	(United Kingdom) Lorcan Hanafin	(Netherlands) Olivier Hart	(Belgium) Matisse Lismont
26	(France) Saintéloc Racing	Audi R8 LMS Evo II	(United States) Wyatt Brichacek	(Belgium) Lorenzo Donniacuo	(Ukraine) Ivan Klymenko	(Belgium) Lorens Lecertua
30	(Belgium) Team WRT	BMW M4 GT3 Evo	(Sweden) Gustav Bergström	(France) Étienne Cheli	(France) Pierre-Louis Chovet	(Belgium) Gilles Stadsbader
35	(Germany) Walkenhorst Motorsport	Aston Martin Vantage AMR GT3 Evo	(France) Romain Leroux	(Sweden) Oliver Söderström	(Ecuador) Mateo Villagómez	
42	(United Kingdom) Century Motorsport	BMW M4 GT3 Evo	(Netherlands) Mex Jansen	(United Kingdom) Will Moore	(South Africa) Jarrod Waberski	
54	(Italy) Dinamic GT	Porsche 911 GT3 R (992)	(United Arab Emirates) Federico Al Rifai	(France) Sébastien Baud	(Sri Lanka) Eshan Pieris	(Netherlands) Jop Rappange
60	(Italy) VSR	Lamborghini Huracán GT3 Evo 2	(Italy) Michele Beretta	(Italy) Alessio Deledda	(Italy) Andrea Frassineti	(Italy) Mattia Michelotto
65	(Germany) HRT Ford Performance	Ford Mustang GT3	(France) Romain Andriolo	(Germany) Salman Owega	(Germany) David Schumacher	(Germany) Finn Wiebelhaus
99	(Italy) Tresor Attempto Racing	Audi R8 LMS Evo II	(Germany) Alex Aka	(United States) Philippe Denes	(Italy) Alberto Di Folco	(Argentina) Ezequiel Pérez Companc
112	(France) CSA Racing	McLaren 720S GT3 Evo	(France) Edgar Maloigne	(United Kingdom) Josh Mason	(France) Maxime Robin	(India) Sai Sanjay
992	(United Kingdom) Paradine Competition	BMW M4 GT3 Evo	(United Kingdom) Charles Clark	(Brazil) Pedro Ebrahim	(United Kingdom) James Kellett	(Netherlands) Maxime Oosten
Bronze (18 entries)
2	(Malaysia) Johor Motorsports Racing JMR	Chevrolet Corvette Z06 GT3.R	(Malaysia) Prince Abu Bakar Ibrahim	(Malaysia) Prince Jefri Ibrahim	(Australia) Jordan Love	(United Kingdom) Alexander Sims
8	(Switzerland) Kessel Racing	Ferrari 296 GT3	(Italy) Daniele Di Amato	(Italy) David Fumanelli	(Switzerland) Nicolò Rosi	(Italy) Niccolò Schirò
12	(Germany) Rinaldi Racing	Ferrari 296 GT3	(Germany) Christian Hook	(Germany) Felipe Fernández Laser	(South Africa) David Perel	(Italy) Davide Rigon
15	(Italy) BMW Italia Ceccato Racing	BMW M4 GT3 Evo	(Italy) Felice Jelmini	(Italy) Federico Malvestiti	(United States) Connor De Phillippi	(Brazil) Marcelo Tomasoni
25	(France) Saintéloc Racing	Audi R8 LMS Evo II	(France) Paul Evrard	(United States) Reece Gold	(Belgium) Gilles Magnus	(France) Benjamin Ricci
27	(Qatar) QMMF by Saintéloc Racing	Audi R8 LMS Evo II	(Qatar) Ibrahim Al-Abdulghani	(Qatar) Abdulla Ali Al-Khelaifi	(Germany) Julian Hanses	(Qatar) Ghanim Salah Al-Maadheed
52	(Italy) AF Corse - Francorchamps Motors	Ferrari 296 GT3	(Belgium) Jef Machiels	(Belgium) Louis Machiels	(Italy) Tommaso Mosca	(Argentina) Marcos Siebert
66	(Italy) Tresor Attempto Racing	Audi R8 LMS Evo II	(Austria) Max Hofer	Andrey Mukovoz	Alexey Nesov	(Luxembourg) Dylan Pereira
74	(Switzerland) Kessel Racing	Ferrari 296 GT3	(United States) Dustin Blattner	(Denmark) Conrad Laursen	(Germany) Dennis Marschall	(Canada) Zacharie Robichon
76	(United Kingdom) Barwell Motorsport	Lamborghini Huracán GT3 Evo 2	(Canada) Adam Ali	(United Kingdom) Ricky Collard	(United Kingdom) Rob Collard	(United States) Bijoy Garg
80	(Germany) Lionspeed GP	Porsche 911 GT3 R (992)	(Switzerland) Ricardo Feller	(Germany) Patrick Kolb	(Italy) Riccardo Pera	(Luxembourg) Gabriel Rindone
81	(United States) Winward Racing	Mercedes-AMG GT3 Evo	(Netherlands) "Daan Arrow"	(Germany) Marvin Dienst	(Italy) Gabriele Piana	(Armenia) Rinat Salikhov (Note: Salikhov is Russian, but he competes under an Armenian licence as Russian national emblems were banned by the FIA following the Russian invasion of Ukraine.)
91	(Germany) Herberth Motorsport	Porsche 911 GT3 R (992)	(Germany) Ralf Bohn	(Zimbabwe) Axcil Jefferies	(Germany) Alfred Renauer	(Germany) Robert Renauer
93	(United Kingdom) Ziggo Sport – Tempesta Racing	Ferrari 296 GT3	(Italy) Eddie Cheever III	(United Kingdom) Chris Froggatt	(Hong Kong) Jonathan Hui	(Italy) Lorenzo Patrese
97	(Germany) Rutronik Racing	Porsche 911 GT3 R (992)	(Hong Kong) Antares Au	(Netherlands) Loek Hartog	(Netherlands) Morris Schuring	(Estonia) Martin Rump
188	(United Kingdom) Garage 59	McLaren 720S GT3 Evo	(United Kingdom) Tom Fleming	(United Kingdom) Jack Hawksworth	(Portugal) Guilherme Oliveira	(Portugal) Miguel Ramos
222	(Bahrain) 2 Seas Motorsport	Mercedes-AMG GT3 Evo	(United Kingdom) Charles Dawson	(United Kingdom) Kiern Jewiss	(Canada) Parker Thompson	(United Kingdom) Lewis Williamson
270	(Belgium) Comtoyou Racing	Aston Martin Vantage AMR GT3 Evo	(Mozambique) Rodrigo Almeida	(United Kingdom) Jessica Hawkins	(Belgium) Alexandre Leroy	(Belgium) Antoine Potty
991	(United Kingdom) Paradine Competition	BMW M4 GT3 Evo	(United Kingdom) Jake Dennis	(Indonesia) Sean Gelael	(United Kingdom) Darren Leung	(United Kingdom) Toby Sowery
Pro-Am (7 entries)
4	(United States) CrowdStrike by SPS	Mercedes-AMG GT3 Evo	(United States) Colin Braun	(Netherlands) Nicky Catsburg	(United States) Ian James	(United States) George Kurtz
11	(Belgium) Comtoyou Racing	Aston Martin Vantage AMR GT3 Evo	(Mexico) Sebastián Álvarez	(France) Frédéric Jousset	(Brazil) Sérgio Sette Câmara	(Portugal) Bernardo Sousa
28	(Antigua and Barbuda) HAAS RT	Audi R8 LMS Evo II	(Belgium) Simon Balcaen	(Belgium) Xavier Knauf	(France) Steven Palette	(Belgium) Grégory Servais
29	(France) AV Racing by Car Collection	Porsche 911 GT3 R (992)	(France) Noam Abramczyk	(Belgium) Mathieu Detry	(Belgium) Fabian Duffieux	(China) Yuan Bo
70	(Italy) AF Corse	Ferrari 296 GT3	(Italy) Riccardo Agostini	(United Kingdom) Matt Bell	(United States) Blake McDonald	(Brazil) Custodio Toledo
71	(Italy) AF Corse	Ferrari 296 GT3	(Belgium) Stéphane Lémeret	(Spain) Miguel Molina	(Argentina) Luis Pérez Companc	(Argentina) Matías Pérez Companc
100	(United Kingdom) Beechdean Motorsport	Aston Martin Vantage AMR GT3 Evo	(United Kingdom) Ross Gunn	(France) Valentin Hasse-Clot	(United Kingdom) Andrew Howard	(United States) Anthony McIntosh

== Qualifying results ==
=== Superpole ===
Pos.	Class	No.	Team	Car	Time
1	P	59	(United Kingdom) Garage 59	McLaren 720S GT3 Evo	2:15.113
2	P	17	(Germany) Mercedes-AMG Team GetSpeed	Mercedes-AMG GT3 Evo	+0.414
3	P	31	(Belgium) Team WRT	BMW M4 GT3 Evo	+0.600
4	P	9	(Belgium) Boutsen VDS	Mercedes-AMG GT3 Evo	+0.679
5	P	51	(Italy) AF Corse - Francorchamps Motors	Ferrari 296 GT3	+0.681
6	P	48	(United States) Mercedes-AMG Team Mann Filter	Mercedes-AMG GT3 Evo	+0.804
7	P	163	(Italy) VSR	Lamborghini Huracán GT3 Evo 2	+0.835
8	P	7	(Belgium) Comtoyou Racing	Aston Martin Vantage AMR GT3 Evo	+0.947
9	G	92	(Germany) Herberth Motorsport	Porsche 911 GT3 R (992)	+1.014
10	P	50	(Italy) AF Corse - Francorchamps Motors	Ferrari 296 GT3	+1.051
11	P	22	(France) Schumacher CLRT	Porsche 911 GT3 R (992)	+1.101
12	P	63	(Austria) GRT - Grasser Racing Team	Lamborghini Huracán GT3 Evo 2	+1.137
13	G	33	(Netherlands) Verstappen.com Racing	Aston Martin Vantage AMR GT3 Evo	+1.244
14	P	98	(Germany) Rowe Racing	BMW M4 GT3 Evo	+1.348
15	P	96	(Germany) Rutronik Racing	Porsche 911 GT3 R (992)	+1.555
16	P	32	(Belgium) Team WRT	BMW M4 GT3 Evo	+1.917
17	P	18	(Italy) Dinamic GT	Porsche 911 GT3 R (992)	+1.955
18	P	46	(Belgium) Team WRT	BMW M4 GT3 Evo	+2.003
19	P	998	(Germany) Rowe Racing	BMW M4 GT3 Evo	+2.472
NC	P	34	(Germany) Walkenhorst Motorsport	Aston Martin Vantage AMR GT3 Evo	No time

== Race results ==
Class winners denoted in bold and with ‡

Pos	Class	No.	Team	Drivers	Car	Laps	Time/Retired
Pos	Class	No.	Team	Drivers	Engine	Laps	Time/Retired
1	P	**63**	**(Austria) GRT - Grasser Racing Team**	**(Italy) Mirko Bortolotti (Germany) Luca Engstler (South Africa) Jordan Pepper**	**Lamborghini Huracán GT3 Evo 2**	**549**	**24:00:53.808‡**
1	P	**63**	**(Austria) GRT - Grasser Racing Team**	**(Italy) Mirko Bortolotti (Germany) Luca Engstler (South Africa) Jordan Pepper**	**Lamborghini DGF 5.2 L V10**	**549**	**24:00:53.808‡**
2	P	96	(Germany) Rutronik Racing	(Germany) Sven Müller (Switzerland) Patric Niederhauser (Belgium) Alessio Picariello	Porsche 911 GT3 R (992)	549	+8.703
2	P	96	(Germany) Rutronik Racing	(Germany) Sven Müller (Switzerland) Patric Niederhauser (Belgium) Alessio Picariello	Porsche M97/80 4.2 L Flat-6	549	+8.703
3	P	51	(Italy) AF Corse - Francorchamps Motors	(Monaco) Vincent Abril (Italy) Alessandro Pier Guidi (Italy) Alessio Rovera	Ferrari 296 GT3	549	+26.639
3	P	51	(Italy) AF Corse - Francorchamps Motors	(Monaco) Vincent Abril (Italy) Alessandro Pier Guidi (Italy) Alessio Rovera	Ferrari F163CE 3.0 L Turbo V6	549	+26.639
4	P	50	(Italy) AF Corse - Francorchamps Motors	(Italy) Eliseo Donno (Italy) Antonio Fuoco (Monaco) Arthur Leclerc	Ferrari 296 GT3	549	+47.575
4	P	50	(Italy) AF Corse - Francorchamps Motors	(Italy) Eliseo Donno (Italy) Antonio Fuoco (Monaco) Arthur Leclerc	Ferrari F163CE 3.0 L Turbo V6	549	+47.575
5	P	98	(Germany) Rowe Racing	(Brazil) Augusto Farfus (Finland) Jesse Krohn (Switzerland) Raffaele Marciello	BMW M4 GT3 Evo	549	+54.753
5	P	98	(Germany) Rowe Racing	(Brazil) Augusto Farfus (Finland) Jesse Krohn (Switzerland) Raffaele Marciello	BMW P58 3.0 L Twin-turbo I6	549	+54.753
6	P	59	(United Kingdom) Garage 59	(Germany) Benjamin Goethe (Germany) Marvin Kirchhöfer (United Kingdom) Joseph Loake	McLaren 720S GT3 Evo	549	+1:26.109
6	P	59	(United Kingdom) Garage 59	(Germany) Benjamin Goethe (Germany) Marvin Kirchhöfer (United Kingdom) Joseph Loake	McLaren M840T 4.0 L Turbo V8	549	+1:26.109
7	P	32	(Belgium) Team WRT	(South Africa) Kelvin van der Linde (Belgium) Charles Weerts (Belgium) Ugo de Wilde	BMW M4 GT3 Evo	548	+1 Lap
7	P	32	(Belgium) Team WRT	(South Africa) Kelvin van der Linde (Belgium) Charles Weerts (Belgium) Ugo de Wilde	BMW P58 3.0 L Twin-turbo I6	548	+1 Lap
8	P	31	(Belgium) Team WRT	(South Africa) Sheldon van der Linde (Belgium) Dries Vanthoor (Germany) Marco Wittmann	BMW M4 GT3 Evo	548	+1 Lap
8	P	31	(Belgium) Team WRT	(South Africa) Sheldon van der Linde (Belgium) Dries Vanthoor (Germany) Marco Wittmann	BMW P58 3.0 L Twin-turbo I6	548	+1 Lap
9	G	**33**	**(Netherlands) Verstappen.com Racing**	**(United Kingdom) Harry King (United Kingdom) Chris Lulham (Netherlands) Thierry Vermeulen**	**Aston Martin Vantage AMR GT3 Evo**	**548**	**+1 Lap‡**
9	G	**33**	**(Netherlands) Verstappen.com Racing**	**(United Kingdom) Harry King (United Kingdom) Chris Lulham (Netherlands) Thierry Vermeulen**	**Aston Martin M177 4.0 L Turbo V8**	**548**	**+1 Lap‡**
10	P	48	(United States) Mercedes-AMG Team Mann Filter	(Austria) Lucas Auer (Italy) Matteo Cairoli (Germany) Maro Engel	Mercedes-AMG GT3 Evo	548	+1 Lap
10	P	48	(United States) Mercedes-AMG Team Mann Filter	(Austria) Lucas Auer (Italy) Matteo Cairoli (Germany) Maro Engel	Mercedes-Benz M159 6.2 L V8	548	+1 Lap
11	P	46	(Belgium) Team WRT	(Denmark) Kevin Magnussen (Germany) René Rast (Italy) Valentino Rossi	BMW M4 GT3 Evo	548	+1 Lap
11	P	46	(Belgium) Team WRT	(Denmark) Kevin Magnussen (Germany) René Rast (Italy) Valentino Rossi	BMW P58 3.0 L Twin-turbo I6	548	+1 Lap
12	G	58	(United Kingdom) Garage 59	(United Kingdom) Dean MacDonald (Monaco) Louis Prette (Denmark) Frederik Schandorff (United Kingdom) Adam Smalley	McLaren 720S GT3 Evo	547	+2 Laps
12	G	58	(United Kingdom) Garage 59	(United Kingdom) Dean MacDonald (Monaco) Louis Prette (Denmark) Frederik Schandorff (United Kingdom) Adam Smalley	McLaren M840T 4.0 L Turbo V8	547	+2 Laps
13	G	111	(France) CSA Racing	(France) Simon Gachet (United Kingdom) James Kell (France) Jim Pla (France) Arthur Rougier	McLaren 720S GT3 Evo	547	+2 Laps
13	G	111	(France) CSA Racing	(France) Simon Gachet (United Kingdom) James Kell (France) Jim Pla (France) Arthur Rougier	McLaren M840T 4.0 L Turbo V8	547	+2 Laps
14	S	**35**	**(Germany) Walkenhorst Motorsport**	**(France) Romain Leroux (Sweden) Oliver Söderström (Ecuador) Mateo Villagómez**	**Aston Martin Vantage AMR GT3 Evo**	**547**	**+2 Laps‡**
14	S	**35**	**(Germany) Walkenhorst Motorsport**	**(France) Romain Leroux (Sweden) Oliver Söderström (Ecuador) Mateo Villagómez**	**Aston Martin M177 4.0 L Turbo V8**	**547**	**+2 Laps‡**
15	B	**74**	**(Switzerland) Kessel Racing**	**(United States) Dustin Blattner (Denmark) Conrad Laursen (Germany) Dennis Marschall (Canada) Zacharie Robichon**	**Ferrari 296 GT3**	**547**	**+2 Laps‡**
15	B	**74**	**(Switzerland) Kessel Racing**	**(United States) Dustin Blattner (Denmark) Conrad Laursen (Germany) Dennis Marschall (Canada) Zacharie Robichon**	**Ferrari F163CE 3.0 L Turbo V6**	**547**	**+2 Laps‡**
16	G	120	(United States) Wright Motorsports	(United States) Adam Adelson (Australia) Tom Sargent (United States) Elliot Skeer	Porsche 911 GT3 R (992)	546	+3 Laps
16	G	120	(United States) Wright Motorsports	(United States) Adam Adelson (Australia) Tom Sargent (United States) Elliot Skeer	Porsche M97/80 4.2 L Flat-6	546	+3 Laps
17	B	81	(United States) Winward Racing	(Netherlands) "Daan Arrow" (Germany) Marvin Dienst (Italy) Gabriele Piana (Armenia) Rinat Salikhov	Mercedes-AMG GT3 Evo	546	+3 Laps
17	B	81	(United States) Winward Racing	(Netherlands) "Daan Arrow" (Germany) Marvin Dienst (Italy) Gabriele Piana (Armenia) Rinat Salikhov	Mercedes-Benz M159 6.2 L V8	546	+3 Laps
18	S	26	(France) Saintéloc Racing	(United States) Wyatt Brichacek (Belgium) Lorenzo Donniacuo (Ukraine) Ivan Klymenko (Belgium) Lorens Lecertua	Audi R8 LMS Evo II	546	+3 Laps
18	S	26	(France) Saintéloc Racing	(United States) Wyatt Brichacek (Belgium) Lorenzo Donniacuo (Ukraine) Ivan Klymenko (Belgium) Lorens Lecertua	Audi DAR 5.2 L V10	546	+3 Laps
19	B	25	(France) Saintéloc Racing	(France) Paul Evrard (United States) Reece Gold (Belgium) Gilles Magnus (France) Benjamin Ricci	Audi R8 LMS Evo II	546	+3 Laps
19	B	25	(France) Saintéloc Racing	(France) Paul Evrard (United States) Reece Gold (Belgium) Gilles Magnus (France) Benjamin Ricci	Audi DAR 5.2 L V10	546	+3 Laps
20	G	777	(Oman) AlManar Racing by Team WRT	(Oman) Al Faisal Al Zubair (Germany) Jens Klingmann (United Kingdom) Ben Tuck (United States) Neil Verhagen	BMW M4 GT3 Evo	546	+3 Laps
20	G	777	(Oman) AlManar Racing by Team WRT	(Oman) Al Faisal Al Zubair (Germany) Jens Klingmann (United Kingdom) Ben Tuck (United States) Neil Verhagen	BMW P58 3.0 L Twin-turbo I6	546	+3 Laps
21	B	80	(Germany) Lionspeed GP	(Switzerland) Ricardo Feller (Germany) Patrick Kolb (Italy) Riccardo Pera (Luxembourg) Gabriel Rindone	Porsche 911 GT3 R (992)	546	+3 Laps
21	B	80	(Germany) Lionspeed GP	(Switzerland) Ricardo Feller (Germany) Patrick Kolb (Italy) Riccardo Pera (Luxembourg) Gabriel Rindone	Porsche M97/80 4.2 L Flat-6	546	+3 Laps
22	B	188	(United Kingdom) Garage 59	(United Kingdom) Shaun Balfe (United Kingdom) Tom Fleming (United Kingdom) Jack Hawksworth (Portugal) Guilherme Oliveira	McLaren 720S GT3 Evo	545	+4 Laps
22	B	188	(United Kingdom) Garage 59	(United Kingdom) Shaun Balfe (United Kingdom) Tom Fleming (United Kingdom) Jack Hawksworth (Portugal) Guilherme Oliveira	McLaren M840T 4.0 L Turbo V8	545	+4 Laps
23	S	42	(United Kingdom) Century Motorsport	(Netherlands) Mex Jansen (United Kingdom) Will Moore (South Africa) Jarrod Waberski	BMW M4 GT3 Evo	545	+4 Laps
23	S	42	(United Kingdom) Century Motorsport	(Netherlands) Mex Jansen (United Kingdom) Will Moore (South Africa) Jarrod Waberski	BMW P58 3.0 L Twin-turbo I6	545	+4 Laps
24	S	30	(Belgium) Team WRT	(Sweden) Gustav Bergström (France) Étienne Cheli (France) Pierre-Louis Chovet (Belgium) Gilles Stadsbader	BMW M4 GT3 Evo	544	+5 Laps
24	S	30	(Belgium) Team WRT	(Sweden) Gustav Bergström (France) Étienne Cheli (France) Pierre-Louis Chovet (Belgium) Gilles Stadsbader	BMW P58 3.0 L Twin-turbo I6	544	+5 Laps
25	B	91	(Germany) Herberth Motorsport	(Germany) Ralf Bohn (Zimbabwe) Axcil Jefferies (Germany) Alfred Renauer (Germany) Robert Renauer	Porsche 911 GT3 R (992)	544	+5 Laps
25	B	91	(Germany) Herberth Motorsport	(Germany) Ralf Bohn (Zimbabwe) Axcil Jefferies (Germany) Alfred Renauer (Germany) Robert Renauer	Porsche M97/80 4.2 L Flat-6	544	+5 Laps
26	B	222	(Bahrain) 2 Seas Motorsport	(United Kingdom) Charles Dawson (United Kingdom) Kiern Jewiss (Canada) Parker Thompson (United Kingdom) Lewis Williamson	Mercedes-AMG GT3 Evo	544	+5 Laps
26	B	222	(Bahrain) 2 Seas Motorsport	(United Kingdom) Charles Dawson (United Kingdom) Kiern Jewiss (Canada) Parker Thompson (United Kingdom) Lewis Williamson	Mercedes-Benz M159 6.2 L V8	544	+5 Laps
27	S	10	(Belgium) Boutsen VDS	(France) Loris Cabirou (United Kingdom) Hugo Cook (France) César Gazeau (France) Aurélien Panis	Mercedes-AMG GT3 Evo	544	+5 Laps
27	S	10	(Belgium) Boutsen VDS	(France) Loris Cabirou (United Kingdom) Hugo Cook (France) César Gazeau (France) Aurélien Panis	Mercedes-Benz M159 6.2 L V8	544	+5 Laps
28	B	8	(Switzerland) Kessel Racing	(Italy) Daniele Di Amato (Italy) David Fumanelli (Switzerland) Nicolò Rosi (Italy) Niccolò Schirò	Ferrari 296 GT3	543	+6 Laps
28	B	8	(Switzerland) Kessel Racing	(Italy) Daniele Di Amato (Italy) David Fumanelli (Switzerland) Nicolò Rosi (Italy) Niccolò Schirò	Ferrari F163CE 3.0 L Turbo V6	543	+6 Laps
29	P	998	(Germany) Rowe Racing	(Austria) Philipp Eng (United Kingdom) Dan Harper (Germany) Max Hesse	BMW M4 GT3 Evo	542	+7 Laps
29	P	998	(Germany) Rowe Racing	(Austria) Philipp Eng (United Kingdom) Dan Harper (Germany) Max Hesse	BMW P58 3.0 L Twin-turbo I6	542	+7 Laps
30	S	54	(Italy) Dinamic GT	(United Arab Emirates) Federico Al Rifai (France) Sébastien Baud (Sri Lanka) Eshan Pieris (Netherlands) Jop Rappange	Porsche 911 GT3 R (992)	542	+7 Laps
30	S	54	(Italy) Dinamic GT	(United Arab Emirates) Federico Al Rifai (France) Sébastien Baud (Sri Lanka) Eshan Pieris (Netherlands) Jop Rappange	Porsche M97/80 4.2 L Flat-6	542	+7 Laps
31	PA	**29**	**(France) AV Racing by Car Collection**	**(France) Noam Abramczyk (Belgium) Mathieu Detry (Belgium) Fabian Duffieux (China) Yuan Bo**	**Porsche 911 GT3 R (992)**	**542**	**+7 Laps‡**
31	PA	**29**	**(France) AV Racing by Car Collection**	**(France) Noam Abramczyk (Belgium) Mathieu Detry (Belgium) Fabian Duffieux (China) Yuan Bo**	**Porsche M97/80 4.2 L Flat-6**	**542**	**+7 Laps‡**
32	PA	100	(United Kingdom) Beechdean Motorsport	(United Kingdom) Ross Gunn (France) Valentin Hasse-Clot (United Kingdom) Andrew Howard (United States) Anthony McIntosh	Aston Martin Vantage AMR GT3 Evo	542	+7 Laps
32	PA	100	(United Kingdom) Beechdean Motorsport	(United Kingdom) Ross Gunn (France) Valentin Hasse-Clot (United Kingdom) Andrew Howard (United States) Anthony McIntosh	Aston Martin M177 4.0 L Turbo V8	542	+7 Laps
33	B	52	(Italy) AF Corse - Francorchamps Motors	(Belgium) Jef Machiels (Belgium) Louis Machiels (Italy) Tommaso Mosca (Argentina) Marcos Siebert	Ferrari 296 GT3	542	+7 Laps
33	B	52	(Italy) AF Corse - Francorchamps Motors	(Belgium) Jef Machiels (Belgium) Louis Machiels (Italy) Tommaso Mosca (Argentina) Marcos Siebert	Ferrari F163CE 3.0 L Turbo V6	542	+7 Laps
34	B	76	(United Kingdom) Barwell Motorsport	(Canada) Adam Ali (United Kingdom) Ricky Collard (United Kingdom) Rob Collard (United States) Bijoy Garg	Lamborghini Huracán GT3 Evo 2	541	+8 Laps
34	B	76	(United Kingdom) Barwell Motorsport	(Canada) Adam Ali (United Kingdom) Ricky Collard (United Kingdom) Rob Collard (United States) Bijoy Garg	Lamborghini DGF 5.2 L V10	541	+8 Laps
35	S	65	(Germany) HRT Ford Performance	(France) Romain Andriolo (Germany) Salman Owega (Germany) David Schumacher (Germany) Finn Wiebelhaus	Ford Mustang GT3	540	+9 Laps
35	S	65	(Germany) HRT Ford Performance	(France) Romain Andriolo (Germany) Salman Owega (Germany) David Schumacher (Germany) Finn Wiebelhaus	Ford Coyote 5.4 L V8	540	+9 Laps
36	PA	4	(United States) CrowdStrike by SPS	(United States) Colin Braun (Netherlands) Nicky Catsburg (United States) Ian James (United States) George Kurtz	Mercedes-AMG GT3 Evo	540	+9 Laps
36	PA	4	(United States) CrowdStrike by SPS	(United States) Colin Braun (Netherlands) Nicky Catsburg (United States) Ian James (United States) George Kurtz	Mercedes-Benz M159 6.2 L V8	540	+9 Laps
37	G	611	(Germany) Nordique Racing	(Japan) Kazuto Kotaka (Italy) Edoardo Liberati (Japan) Yuichi Nakayama (Germany) Tim Sandtler	Mercedes-AMG GT3 Evo	539	+10 Laps
37	G	611	(Germany) Nordique Racing	(Japan) Kazuto Kotaka (Italy) Edoardo Liberati (Japan) Yuichi Nakayama (Germany) Tim Sandtler	Mercedes-Benz M159 6.2 L V8	539	+10 Laps
38	PA	71	(Italy) AF Corse	(Belgium) Stéphane Lémeret (Spain) Miguel Molina (Argentina) Luis Pérez Companc (Argentina) Matías Pérez Companc	Ferrari 296 GT3	537	+12 Laps
38	PA	71	(Italy) AF Corse	(Belgium) Stéphane Lémeret (Spain) Miguel Molina (Argentina) Luis Pérez Companc (Argentina) Matías Pérez Companc	Ferrari F163CE 3.0 L Turbo V6	537	+12 Laps
39	G	5	(United Kingdom) Optimum Motorsport	(Denmark) Largim Ali (Australia) James Allen (United Kingdom) Ollie Millroy (United Kingdom) Mikey Porter	McLaren 720S GT3 Evo	536	+13 Laps
39	G	5	(United Kingdom) Optimum Motorsport	(Denmark) Largim Ali (Australia) James Allen (United Kingdom) Ollie Millroy (United Kingdom) Mikey Porter	McLaren M840T 4.0 L Turbo V8	536	+13 Laps
40	S	24	(United Kingdom) Steller Motorsport	(Canada) Daniel Ali (United Kingdom) Lorcan Hanafin (Netherlands) Olivier Hart (Belgium) Matisse Lismont	Chevrolet Corvette Z06 GT3.R	535	+14 Laps
40	S	24	(United Kingdom) Steller Motorsport	(Canada) Daniel Ali (United Kingdom) Lorcan Hanafin (Netherlands) Olivier Hart (Belgium) Matisse Lismont	Chevrolet LT6 5.5 L V8	535	+14 Laps
41	B	12	(Germany) Rinaldi Racing	(Germany) Christian Hook (Germany) Felipe Fernández Laser (South Africa) David Perel (Italy) Davide Rigon	Ferrari 296 GT3	535	+14 Laps
41	B	12	(Germany) Rinaldi Racing	(Germany) Christian Hook (Germany) Felipe Fernández Laser (South Africa) David Perel (Italy) Davide Rigon	Ferrari F163CE 3.0 L Turbo V6	535	+14 Laps
42	G	333	(Germany) Paul Motorsport	(Italy) Marzio Moretti (Germany) Maximilian Paul (Poland) Robin Rogalski (United States) John Paul Southern Jr.	Lamborghini Huracán GT3 Evo 2	531	+18 Laps
42	G	333	(Germany) Paul Motorsport	(Italy) Marzio Moretti (Germany) Maximilian Paul (Poland) Robin Rogalski (United States) John Paul Southern Jr.	Lamborghini DGF 5.2 L V10	531	+18 Laps
43	B	2	(Malaysia) Johor Motorsports Racing JMR	(Malaysia) Prince Abu Bakar Ibrahim (Malaysia) Prince Jefri Ibrahim (Australia) Jordan Love (United Kingdom) Alexander Sims	Chevrolet Corvette Z06 GT3.R	527	+22 Laps
43	B	2	(Malaysia) Johor Motorsports Racing JMR	(Malaysia) Prince Abu Bakar Ibrahim (Malaysia) Prince Jefri Ibrahim (Australia) Jordan Love (United Kingdom) Alexander Sims	Chevrolet LT6 5.5 L V8	527	+22 Laps
44	PA	28	(Antigua and Barbuda) HAAS RT	(Belgium) Simon Balcaen (Belgium) Xavier Knauf (France) Steven Palette (Belgium) Grégory Servais	Audi R8 LMS Evo II	525	+24 Laps
44	PA	28	(Antigua and Barbuda) HAAS RT	(Belgium) Simon Balcaen (Belgium) Xavier Knauf (France) Steven Palette (Belgium) Grégory Servais	Audi DAR 5.2 L V10	525	+24 Laps
45	B	97	(Germany) Rutronik Racing	(Hong Kong) Antares Au (Netherlands) Loek Hartog (Netherlands) Morris Schuring (Estonia) Martin Rump	Porsche 911 GT3 R (992)	523	+26 Laps
45	B	97	(Germany) Rutronik Racing	(Hong Kong) Antares Au (Netherlands) Loek Hartog (Netherlands) Morris Schuring (Estonia) Martin Rump	Porsche M97/80 4.2 L Flat-6	523	+26 Laps
46	B	27	(Qatar) QMMF by Saintéloc Racing	(Qatar) Ibrahim Al-Abdulghani (Qatar) Abdulla Ali Al-Khelaifi (Qatar) Ghanim Salah Al-Maadheed (Germany) Julian Hanses	Audi R8 LMS Evo II	521	+28 Laps
46	B	27	(Qatar) QMMF by Saintéloc Racing	(Qatar) Ibrahim Al-Abdulghani (Qatar) Abdulla Ali Al-Khelaifi (Qatar) Ghanim Salah Al-Maadheed (Germany) Julian Hanses	Audi DAR 5.2 L V10	521	+28 Laps
47	G	88	(Italy) Tresor Attempto Racing	(Italy) Riccardo Cazzaniga (Italy) Rocco Mazzola (Italy) Leonardo Moncini (Denmark) Sebastian Øgaard	Audi R8 LMS Evo II	507	+42 Laps
47	G	88	(Italy) Tresor Attempto Racing	(Italy) Riccardo Cazzaniga (Italy) Rocco Mazzola (Italy) Leonardo Moncini (Denmark) Sebastian Øgaard	Audi DAR 5.2 L V10	507	+42 Laps
48	P	00	(Japan) Goodsmile Racing	(Japan) Tatsuya Kataoka (Japan) Kamui Kobayashi (Japan) Nobuteru Taniguchi	Mercedes-AMG GT3 Evo	447	+102 Laps
48	P	00	(Japan) Goodsmile Racing	(Japan) Tatsuya Kataoka (Japan) Kamui Kobayashi (Japan) Nobuteru Taniguchi	Mercedes-Benz M159 6.2 L V8	447	+102 Laps
49	B	15	(Italy) BMW Italia Ceccato Racing	(Italy) Felice Jelmini (Italy) Federico Malvestiti (United States) Connor De Phillippi (Brazil) Marcelo Tomasoni	BMW M4 GT3 Evo	445	+104 Laps
49	B	15	(Italy) BMW Italia Ceccato Racing	(Italy) Felice Jelmini (Italy) Federico Malvestiti (United States) Connor De Phillippi (Brazil) Marcelo Tomasoni	BMW P58 3.0 L Twin-turbo I6	445	+104 Laps
50	B	93	(United Kingdom) Ziggo Sport – Tempesta Racing	(Italy) Eddie Cheever III (United Kingdom) Chris Froggatt (Hong Kong) Jonathan Hui (Italy) Lorenzo Patrese	Ferrari 296 GT3	405	+144 Laps
50	B	93	(United Kingdom) Ziggo Sport – Tempesta Racing	(Italy) Eddie Cheever III (United Kingdom) Chris Froggatt (Hong Kong) Jonathan Hui (Italy) Lorenzo Patrese	Ferrari F163CE 3.0 L Turbo V6	405	+144 Laps
51	G	92	(Germany) Herberth Motorsport	(Germany) Tim Heinemann (Switzerland) Rolf Ineichen (Germany) Joel Sturm	Porsche 911 GT3 R (992)	398	+151 Laps
51	G	92	(Germany) Herberth Motorsport	(Germany) Tim Heinemann (Switzerland) Rolf Ineichen (Germany) Joel Sturm	Porsche M97/80 4.2 L Flat-6	398	+151 Laps
DNF	S	19	(Austria) GRT - Grasser Racing Team	Ivan Ekelchik (China) Liang Jiatong (Belgium) Baptiste Moulin (Netherlands) Dante Rappange	Lamborghini Huracán GT3 Evo 2	374	Accident
DNF	S	19	(Austria) GRT - Grasser Racing Team	Ivan Ekelchik (China) Liang Jiatong (Belgium) Baptiste Moulin (Netherlands) Dante Rappange	Lamborghini DGF 5.2 L V10	374	Accident
DNF	S	21	(Belgium) Comtoyou Racing	(Belgium) Nicolas Baert (United Arab Emirates) Jamie Day (Netherlands) Xavier Maassen (Belgium) Kobe Pauwels	Aston Martin Vantage AMR GT3 Evo	337	Gearbox
DNF	S	21	(Belgium) Comtoyou Racing	(Belgium) Nicolas Baert (United Arab Emirates) Jamie Day (Netherlands) Xavier Maassen (Belgium) Kobe Pauwels	Aston Martin M177 4.0 L Turbo V8	337	Gearbox
DNF	P	64	(Germany) HRT Ford Performance	(France) Thomas Drouet (India) Arjun Maini (United Kingdom) Jann Mardenborough	Ford Mustang GT3	323	Accident
DNF	P	64	(Germany) HRT Ford Performance	(France) Thomas Drouet (India) Arjun Maini (United Kingdom) Jann Mardenborough	Ford Coyote 5.4 L V8	323	Accident
DNF	P	163	(Italy) VSR	(Italy) Marco Mapelli (United Kingdom) Sandy Mitchell (France) Franck Perera	Lamborghini Huracán GT3 Evo 2	323	Power steering
DNF	P	163	(Italy) VSR	(Italy) Marco Mapelli (United Kingdom) Sandy Mitchell (France) Franck Perera	Lamborghini DGF 5.2 L V10	323	Power steering
DNF	B	991	(United Kingdom) Paradine Competition	(United Kingdom) Jake Dennis (Indonesia) Sean Gelael (United Kingdom) Darren Leung (United Kingdom) Toby Sowery	BMW M4 GT3 Evo	321	Collision damage
DNF	B	991	(United Kingdom) Paradine Competition	(United Kingdom) Jake Dennis (Indonesia) Sean Gelael (United Kingdom) Darren Leung (United Kingdom) Toby Sowery	BMW P58 3.0 L Twin-turbo I6	321	Collision damage
DNF	S	992	(United Kingdom) Paradine Competition	(United Kingdom) Charles Clark (Brazil) Pedro Ebrahim (United Kingdom) James Kellett (Netherlands) Maxime Oosten	BMW M4 GT3 Evo	303	Mechanical
DNF	S	992	(United Kingdom) Paradine Competition	(United Kingdom) Charles Clark (Brazil) Pedro Ebrahim (United Kingdom) James Kellett (Netherlands) Maxime Oosten	BMW P58 3.0 L Twin-turbo I6	303	Mechanical
DNF	G	23	(United Kingdom) Team RJN	(Republic of Ireland) Reece Barr (United Kingdom) Alex Buncombe (Germany) Ben Dörr (United Kingdom) Tommy Foster	McLaren 720S GT3 Evo	289	Engine
DNF	G	23	(United Kingdom) Team RJN	(Republic of Ireland) Reece Barr (United Kingdom) Alex Buncombe (Germany) Ben Dörr (United Kingdom) Tommy Foster	McLaren M840T 4.0 L Turbo V8	289	Engine
DNF	G	57	(United States) Winward Racing	(Netherlands) Indy Dontje (Switzerland) Philip Ellis (United States) Russell Ward	Mercedes-AMG GT3 Evo	219	Accident damage
DNF	G	57	(United States) Winward Racing	(Netherlands) Indy Dontje (Switzerland) Philip Ellis (United States) Russell Ward	Mercedes-Benz M159 6.2 L V8	219	Accident damage
DNF	P	17	(Germany) Mercedes-AMG Team GetSpeed	(Andorra) Jules Gounon (Germany) Fabian Schiller (Germany) Luca Stolz	Mercedes-AMG GT3 Evo	218	Collision
DNF	P	17	(Germany) Mercedes-AMG Team GetSpeed	(Andorra) Jules Gounon (Germany) Fabian Schiller (Germany) Luca Stolz	Mercedes-Benz M159 6.2 L V8	218	Collision
DNF	S	99	(Italy) Tresor Attempto Racing	(Germany) Alex Aka (United States) Philippe Denes (Italy) Alberto Di Folco (Argentina) Ezequiel Pérez Companc	Audi R8 LMS Evo II	218	Collision
DNF	S	99	(Italy) Tresor Attempto Racing	(Germany) Alex Aka (United States) Philippe Denes (Italy) Alberto Di Folco (Argentina) Ezequiel Pérez Companc	Audi DAR 5.2 L V10	218	Collision
DNF	P	7	(Belgium) Comtoyou Racing	(Italy) Mattia Drudi (Denmark) Marco Sørensen (Denmark) Nicki Thiim	Aston Martin Vantage AMR GT3 Evo	197	Drivetrain
DNF	P	7	(Belgium) Comtoyou Racing	(Italy) Mattia Drudi (Denmark) Marco Sørensen (Denmark) Nicki Thiim	Aston Martin M177 4.0 L Turbo V8	197	Drivetrain
DNF	B	66	(Italy) Tresor Attempto Racing	(Austria) Max Hofer; Andrey Mukovoz; Alexey Nesov (Luxembourg) Dylan Pereira	Audi R8 LMS Evo II	144	Mechanical
DNF	B	66	(Italy) Tresor Attempto Racing	(Austria) Max Hofer; Andrey Mukovoz; Alexey Nesov (Luxembourg) Dylan Pereira	Audi DAR 5.2 L V10	144	Mechanical
DNF	P	911	(Lithuania) Pure Rxcing	(Austria) Richard Lietz (United Kingdom) Alex Malykhin (Austria) Thomas Preining	Porsche 911 GT3 R (992)	136	Steering rack
DNF	P	911	(Lithuania) Pure Rxcing	(Austria) Richard Lietz (United Kingdom) Alex Malykhin (Austria) Thomas Preining	Porsche M97/80 4.2 L Flat-6	136	Steering rack
DNF	P	9	(Belgium) Boutsen VDS	(Germany) Maximilian Götz (Canada) Mikaël Grenier (Belgium) Maxime Martin	Mercedes-AMG GT3 Evo	127	Cooling
DNF	P	9	(Belgium) Boutsen VDS	(Germany) Maximilian Götz (Canada) Mikaël Grenier (Belgium) Maxime Martin	Mercedes-Benz M159 6.2 L V8	127	Cooling
DNF	S	3	(Germany) GetSpeed	(United States) Anthony Bartone (Poland) Karol Basz (Germany) Tom Kalender (Switzerland) Yannick Mettler	Mercedes-AMG GT3 Evo	112	Engine
DNF	S	3	(Germany) GetSpeed	(United States) Anthony Bartone (Poland) Karol Basz (Germany) Tom Kalender (Switzerland) Yannick Mettler	Mercedes-Benz M159 6.2 L V8	112	Engine
DNF	PA	11	(Belgium) Comtoyou Racing	(Mexico) Sebastián Álvarez (France) Frédéric Jousset (Brazil) Sérgio Sette Câmara (Portugal) Bernardo Sousa	Aston Martin Vantage AMR GT3 Evo	99	Accident
DNF	PA	11	(Belgium) Comtoyou Racing	(Mexico) Sebastián Álvarez (France) Frédéric Jousset (Brazil) Sérgio Sette Câmara (Portugal) Bernardo Sousa	Aston Martin M177 4.0 L Turbo V8	99	Accident
DNF	S	6	(Germany) GetSpeed	(Netherlands) Colin Caresani (Netherlands) Lin Hodenius (Thailand) Tanart Sathienthirakul (United Kingdom) Aaron Walker	Mercedes-AMG GT3 Evo	65	Mechanical
DNF	S	6	(Germany) GetSpeed	(Netherlands) Colin Caresani (Netherlands) Lin Hodenius (Thailand) Tanart Sathienthirakul (United Kingdom) Aaron Walker	Mercedes-Benz M159 6.2 L V8	65	Mechanical
DNF	P	18	(Italy) Dinamic GT	(Denmark) Bastian Buus (Australia) Matt Campbell (France) Mathieu Jaminet	Porsche 911 GT3 R (992)	60	Wheel bearing
DNF	P	18	(Italy) Dinamic GT	(Denmark) Bastian Buus (Australia) Matt Campbell (France) Mathieu Jaminet	Porsche M97/80 4.2 L Flat-6	60	Wheel bearing
DNF	S	60	(Italy) VSR	(Italy) Michele Beretta (Italy) Alessio Deledda (Italy) Andrea Frassineti (Italy) Mattia Michelotto	Lamborghini Huracán GT3 Evo 2	46	Collision damage
DNF	S	60	(Italy) VSR	(Italy) Michele Beretta (Italy) Alessio Deledda (Italy) Andrea Frassineti (Italy) Mattia Michelotto	Lamborghini DGF 5.2 L V10	46	Collision damage
DNF	B	270	(Belgium) Comtoyou Racing	(Mozambique) Rodrigo Almeida (United Kingdom) Jessica Hawkins (Belgium) Alexandre Leroy (Belgium) Antoine Potty	Aston Martin Vantage AMR GT3 Evo	43	Collision
DNF	B	270	(Belgium) Comtoyou Racing	(Mozambique) Rodrigo Almeida (United Kingdom) Jessica Hawkins (Belgium) Alexandre Leroy (Belgium) Antoine Potty	Aston Martin M177 4.0 L Turbo V8	43	Collision
DNF	PA	70	(Italy) AF Corse	(Italy) Riccardo Agostini (United Kingdom) Matt Bell (United States) Blake McDonald (Brazil) Custodio Toledo	Ferrari 296 GT3	40	Collision
DNF	PA	70	(Italy) AF Corse	(Italy) Riccardo Agostini (United Kingdom) Matt Bell (United States) Blake McDonald (Brazil) Custodio Toledo	Ferrari F163CE 3.0 L Turbo V6	40	Collision
DNF	P	22	(France) Schumacher CLRT	(Austria) Klaus Bachler (Turkey) Ayhancan Güven (Germany) Laurin Heinrich	Porsche 911 GT3 R (992)	26	Collision
DNF	P	22	(France) Schumacher CLRT	(Austria) Klaus Bachler (Turkey) Ayhancan Güven (Germany) Laurin Heinrich	Porsche M97/80 4.2 L Flat-6	26	Collision
DNF	S	112	(France) CSA Racing	(France) Edgar Maloigne (United Kingdom) Josh Mason (France) Maxime Robin (India) Sai Sanjay	McLaren 720S GT3 Evo	23	Collision
DNF	S	112	(France) CSA Racing	(France) Edgar Maloigne (United Kingdom) Josh Mason (France) Maxime Robin (India) Sai Sanjay	McLaren M840T 4.0 L Turbo V8	23	Collision
Official results

Icon	Class
**P**	Pro Cup
**G**	Gold Cup
**S**	Silver Cup
**PA**	Pro-Am Cup
**B**	Bronze Cup

== Notes ==
Intercontinental GT Challenge
Previous race: 2025 24 Hours of Nürburgring	2025 season	Next race: 2025 Suzuka 1000 km

GT World Challenge Europe Endurance Cup
Previous race: 2025 3 Hours of Monza	2025 season	Next race: 2025 3 Hours of Nürburgring
