= Erik Johansson (racing driver) =

Swedish racing driver (born 1996)

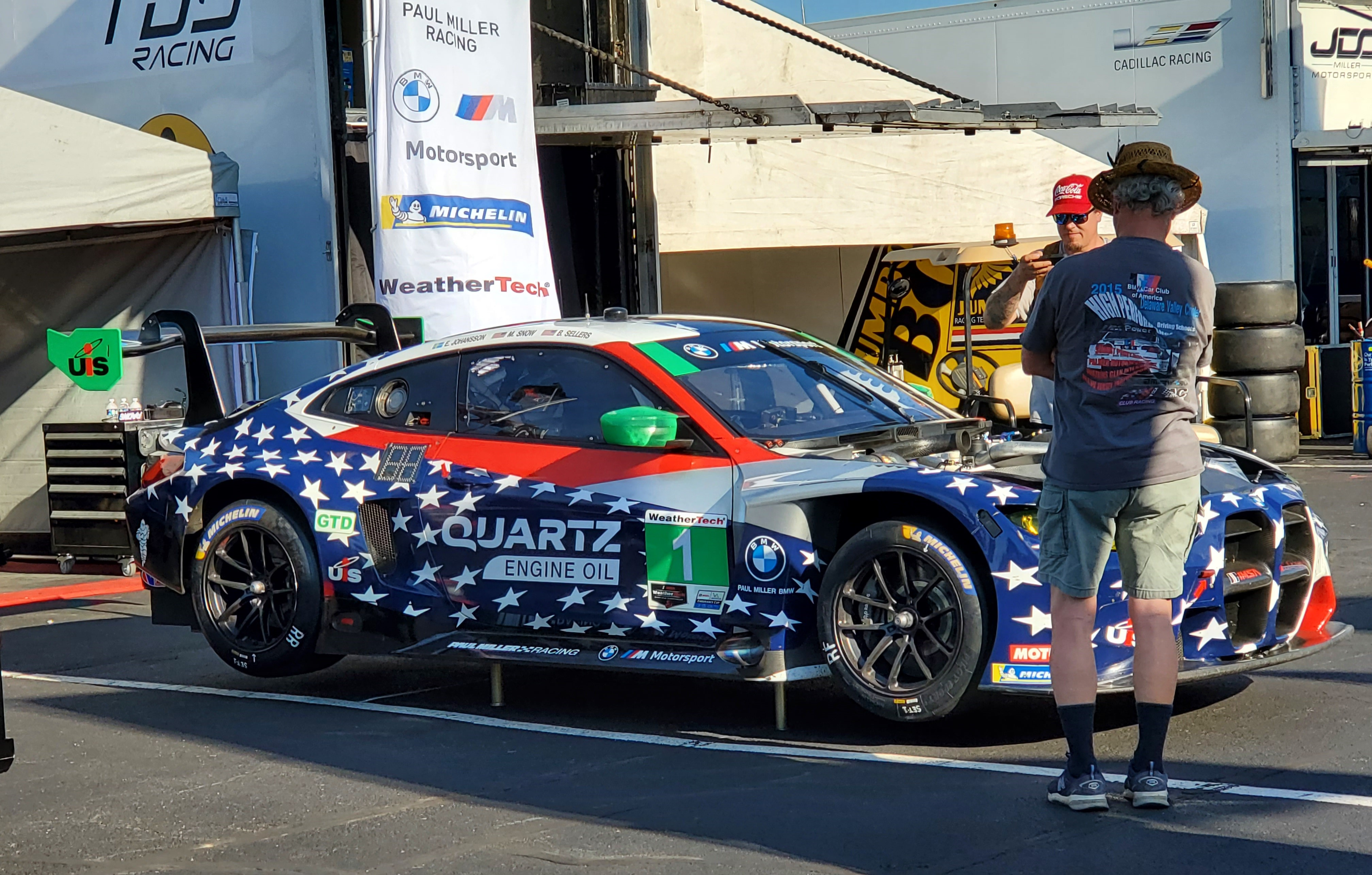
- Johansson in 2022
- Nationality: (Sweden) Swedish
- Born: Erik Martin Johansson; 16 October 1996 (age 30) Gnosjö, Sweden
- Categorisation: FIA Silver (until 2022, 2025–); FIA Gold (2023–2024)

Championship titles
- 2025 2013 2012: China GT Championship – GT3; Formula Renault 1.6 Nordic; Formula Monza

Erik Martin Johansson (born 16 October 1996) is a Swedish racing driver who last competed in the China GT Championship for Fist Team AAI.

== Career ==
Johansson made his single-seater debut in 2012, racing in Formula Monza. In his maiden season in single-seaters, he won every race he contested to take the Formula Monza title in the series' first season. Stepping up to Formula Renault 1.6 Nordic for the following year and joining Team TIDÖ, Johansson took four wins to take the series title by three points over Martin Rump.

After sitting on the sidelines in 2014 whilst being part of the FIA Institute Young Driver Excellence Academy, Johansson joined Team Kia to race in the 2015 Scandinavian Touring Car Championship. In his only season in the series, Johansson scored a best result of fourth at Skövde and Falkenbergs Motorbana, to finish eighth in points despite missing the final two rounds due to economical reasons.

Johansson then spent the following three seasons mainly racing at the Nürburgring, including two appearances at the 24 Hours of Nürburgring, before winning the BMW Junior Driver Selection Program, earning him a drive in the 2019 Italian GT Championship for BMW Team Italia. Driving alongside Stefano Comandini in the Sprint championship, the pair won at Imola and Mugello as they ended the year runner-up in the GT3 standings. The pair were joined by Jesse Krohn in the Endurance championship, with whom they won at Monza and Vallelunga to secure runner-up honors in the overall standings.

The following year, Johansson switched to ADAC GT Masters, originally set to join Schubert Motorsport, but later joining MRS GT-Racing from the second round onwards alongside Jens Klingmann. Racing in the last six rounds of the season, Johansson scored a lone win at the Red Bull Ring in the series' 200th race en route to a 19th-place points finish.

Johansson remained with MRS GT-Racing for 2021, as it began fielding Porsche machinery, mainly competing in the inaugural season of Porsche Carrera Cup North America, in which he took a best result of fifth at Virginia International Raceway. During the year, Johansson also made a one-off return to ADAC GT Masters for the same team at the Sachsenring round.

Returning to the BMW stable for 2022, Johansson drove for Paul Miller Racing in the Endurance rounds of the IMSA SportsCar Championship in the GTD class, and also competed part-time in the Nürburgring Langstrecken-Serie for BMW M Motorsport. The following year, Johansson joined the BMW factory driver roster, but only competed in the qualifying races for that year's 24 Hours of Nürburgring alongside Connor De Phillippi.

After not racing in 2024, Johansson joined Team AAI to race in the China GT Championship, winning half of the season's races en route to the series title at the end of the year. At the end of the year, Johansson competed in the Shanghai 8 Hours with ParkingPark Racing by Z.SPEED in the GT3 Pro-Am class.

== Karting record ==
=== Karting career summary ===
Season	Series	Team	Position
2009	Rotax Max Challenge Sweden – Junior		11th
2010	Rotax Max Challenge Sweden – Junior		4th
2011	Rotax Max Wintercup – Junior Max	Evolution Racing	6th
2011	Rotax Max Euro Trophy – Junior Max	Evolution Racing	23rd
2011	BNL Karting Series – Rotax Junior		10th
2011	Super One Series – Rotax Junior		25th
2011	Kartmasters British GP – Rotax Junior		21st

== Racing record ==
=== Racing career summary ===
Season	Series	Team	Races	Wins	Poles	F/Laps	Podiums	Points	Position
2012	Formula Monza		8	8	9	0	8	175	**1st**
2012	Formula LO	Mirage Motor Company	2	0	0	0	0	0	NC
2013	Formula Renault 2.0 Northern European Cup	KEO Racing	5	0	0	0	0	26	33rd
2013	Formula Renault 1.6 Nordic	Team TIDÖ	15	4	0	0	11	231	**1st**
2013	Formula Renault 1.6 NEZ Championship	Team TIDÖ	2	0	0	0	2	33	**2nd**
2015	Scandinavian Touring Car Championship	Team Kia	10	0	0	0	0	94	8th
2016	VLN Series – BMW M235i							98	5th
2017	VLN Series – SP9	Team Zakspeed; Black Falcon	4	1	0	0	1	0	NC
2017	24 Hours of Nürburgring – SP10	Team Mathol Racing e.V.	1	0	0	0	0	—N/a	DNF
2018	24 Hours of Nürburgring – SP9	Black Falcon	1	0	0	0	0	—N/a	4th
2019	Italian GT Endurance Championship – GT3	BMW Team Italia	4	2	0	0	2	41	**2nd**
2019	Italian GT Sprint Championship – GT3	BMW Team Italia	8	2	0	0	5	95	**2nd**
2019	VLN Series – SP10	Team AVIA Sorg Rennsport	8	3	0	0	7	58.05	4th
2020	ADAC GT Masters	MRS GT-Racing	10	1	0	0	2	54	19th
2021	Porsche Carrera Cup North America	MRS GT-Racing	10	0	0	0	0	50	14th
2021	ADAC GT Masters	MRS GT-Racing	2	0	0	0	0	3	40th
2022	IMSA SportsCar Championship – GTD	Paul Miller Racing	3	0	0	0	0	681	33rd
2022	Nürburgring Langstrecken-Serie – SP8T	BMW M Motorsport	3	0	0	0	0	0	NC
2025	China GT Championship – GT3	FIST Team AAI	8	4	0	0	7	166	**1st**
2025	Shanghai 8 Hours – GT3 Pro-Am	ParkingPark Racing by Z.SPEED	1	0	0	0	0	—N/a	DNF

=== Complete Scandinavian Touring Car Championship results ===
(key) (Races in bold indicate pole position) (Races in italics indicate fastest lap)

Year	Team	Car	1	2	3	4	5	6	7	8	9	10	11	12	13	14	DC	Points
2015	Team Kia	KIA Optima BDE	VRS; 1 Ret	VRS; 2; 4†	AND; 1; 9	AND; 2; 8	MAN; 1; 8	MAN; 2; 11†	FAL; 1; 5	FAL; 2; 4	KAR; 1; 5	KAR; 2; 6	SOL; 1	SOL; 2	KNU; 1	KNU; 2	8th	94

=== Complete ADAC GT Masters results ===
(key) (Races in bold indicate pole position) (Races in italics indicate fastest lap)

Year	Team	Car	1	2	3	4	5	6	7	8	9	10	11	12	13	14	DC	Points
2020	MRS GT-Racing	BMW M6 GT3	LAU1; 1	LAU1; 2	NÜR; 1; 19	NÜR; 2; 31	HOC; 1; 24	HOC; 2; 25	SAC; 1; 10	SAC; 2; 9	RBR; 1; 3	RBR; 2; 1	LAU2; 1 Ret	LAU2; 2; 21	OSC; 1 WD	OSC; 2 WD	19th	54
2021	MRS GT-Racing	Porsche 911 GT3 R	OSC; 1	OSC; 2	RBR; 1	RBR; 2	ZAN; 1	ZAN; 2	LAU; 1	LAU; 2	SAC; 1; 13	SAC; 2; 16	HOC; 1	HOC; 2	NÜR; 1	NÜR; 2	40th	3

=== Complete IMSA SportsCar Championship results ===
(key) (Races in bold indicate pole position)

Year	Team	Class	Make	Engine	1	2	3	4	5	6	7	8	9	10	11	12	Rank	Points
2022	Paul Miller Racing	GTD	BMW M4 GT3	BMW S58B30T0 3.0 L Twin-Turbo I6	DAY	SEB; 16	LBH	LGA	MDO	DET	WGL; 13	MOS	LIM	ELK	VIR	**PET**; 5	40th	681
