= Oliver Söderström =

Swedish racing driver (born 1998)

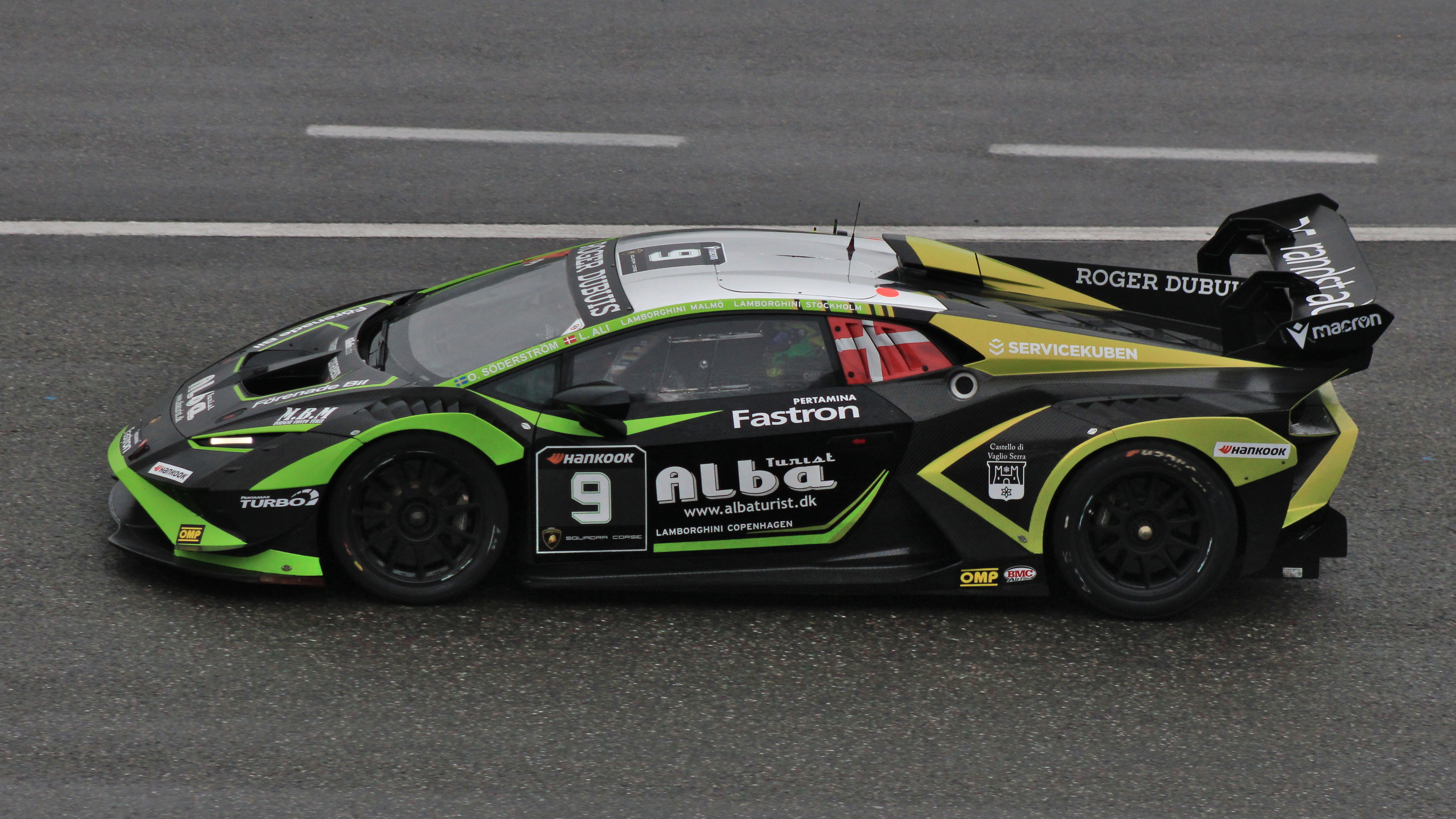
- Söderström in 2024
- Nationality: (Sweden) Swedish
- Born: Lars Gunther Oliver Söderström; 30 June 1998 (age 28) Malmö, Sweden
- Categorisation: FIA Silver

Championship titles
- 2015 2015: Formula Renault 1.6 Nordic; Formula Renault 1.6 NEZ Championship

Lars Gunther Oliver Söderström (born 30 June 1998) is a Swedish racing driver who last competed for Comtoyou Racing in GT World Challenge Europe.

== Career ==
Born into a family that had ties to racing for over a century, Söderström took up karting at the age of seven. Following a karting career headlined by finishing second in the 2012 Gunnar Nilsson Memorial Trophy in KF3, Söderström made his single-seater debut for Scuderia Nordica in Formula Renault 1.6 Nordic in 2013. Returning to Scuderia Nordica and Formula Renault 1.6 Nordic for 2024, Söderström scored his maiden win in single-seaters at the Audru Ring, which helped him finish eighth in the Nordic standings at season's end. Söderström remained with Scuderia Nordica for 2015 to remain in Formula Renault 1.6 Nordic, winning the title after taking eight wins in the seven-round season.

In 2016, Söderström joined ADAC Berlin-Brandenburg to race in the ADAC Formula 4 Championship. In his first season in the series, he took a best result of tenth at Hockenheimring, but his season was headlined by him running away from Robin brezina after the pair crashed out of the race. Söderström remained with the team for his sophomore season, scored a best result of second at Oschersleben, which turned out to be his only podium of the season as he ended the year 18th in points.

Söderström switched to TCR competition for 2018, joining Lestrup Racing to compete in the TCR Scandinavia Touring Car Championship. After finishing 11th in points, Söderström raced in GT4 Scandinavia for 2019, finishing runner-up in the Pro-Am standings by thirteen points. The following year, Söderström returned to the STCC TCR Scandinavia Touring Car Championship. Taking his maiden series win in the season-opening round at Karlskoga, Söderström then scored two more podiums as he closed out the year fifth in points. Staying with Lestrup Racing for 2021, Söderström scored five podiums with a best result of second at Mantorp Park as he closed out the year fourth in points. Söderström remained with Lestrup Racing for a third consecutive season in the STCC TCR Scandinavia Touring Car Championship. After finishing on the podium in the first five races, Söderström won at Karlskoga and Mantorp Park on his way to fifth in points.

The following year, Söderström joined Target Racing to race in Lamborghini Super Trofeo Europe, taking a lone win at Vallelunga en route to a sixth-place points finish. Staying in Super Trofeo Europe and Target Racing for 2024, Söderström won at Imola and Barcelona to end the year runner-up in points.

Söderström switched to GT3 competition full time in 2025, joining Walkenhorst Motorsport to race in GT World Challenge Europe Endurance Cup, as a candidate for the Aston Martin Racing Driver Academy. In his maiden season in the series, Söderström won the 24 Hours of Spa the Silver Cup class, which helped him end the year 13th in the class standings. Remaining with Aston Martin machinery for 2026, Söderström joined Comtoyou Racing for a dual program in both the GT World Challenge Europe Endurance and Sprint Cups. In the former, Söderström took a Silver Cup podium at Le Castellet to take ninth in points, whereas in the latter, he took a lone Silver Cup win at Zandvoort and two other podiums to secure fourth in the class standings.

== Karting record ==
=== Karting career summary ===
Season	Series	Team	Position
2011	Kristianstad KK Grande Finale – Mini		11th
2012	Swedish Karting Championship – KF3		18th
2012	Göteborgs Stora Pris – KF3		16th
2012	Gunnar Nilsson Memorial – KF3	Förenade Racing	2nd
2013	Tom Trana Trophy – KF3		15th

== Racing record ==
=== Racing career summary ===
Season	Series	Team	Races	Wins	Poles	F/laps	Podiums	Points	Position
2013	Formula Renault 1.6 Nordic	Scuderia Nordica	11	0	0	0	0	47	9th
2013	Formula Renault 1.6 NEC	Scuderia Nordica	6	0	0	0	0	88	10th
2014	Formula Renault 1.6 Nordic	Scuderia Nordica	11	1	0	0	2	108	8th
2014	Formula Renault 1.6 NEC	Scuderia Nordica	15	0	0	0	0	177	7th
2015	Formula Renault 2.0 Northern European Cup	Fragus BR Motorsport	2	0	0	0	0	0	43rd
2015	Formula Renault 1.6 Nordic	PWR Junior Team	15	8	8	3	11	282	**1st**
2015	Formula Renault 1.6 NEZ Championship	PWR Junior Team	4	3	2	1	3	75	**1st**
2016	ADAC Formula 4 Championship	ADAC Berlin-Brandenburg	21	0	0	0	0	1	28th
2017	ADAC Formula 4 Championship	ADAC Berlin-Brandenburg	21	0	0	0	1	27	18th
2017	Italian F4 Championship	BWT Mücke Motorsport	3	0	0	0	0	0	NC
2018	TCR Scandinavia Touring Car Championship	Lestrup Racing Team	12	0	0	0	0	30	11th
2018	GT4 European Series – Pro-Am	Lestrup Racing Team	6	0	0	0	0	20	22nd
2019	GT4 Scandinavia – Pro-Am	Lestrup Racing Team	12	4	2	0	5	172	**2nd**
2019	GT4 European Series – Silver	Lestrup Racing Team	2	0	0	0	0	0	NC
2020	STCC TCR Scandinavia Touring Car Championship	Lestrup Racing	11	1	1	0	3	108	5th
2020	24H TCE Series – TCE	Lestrup Racing	1	0	0	0	0	0	NC
2021	STCC TCR Scandinavia Touring Car Championship	Lestrup Racing Team by Volkswagen Stockholm	18	0	0	2	5	220	4th
2022	STCC TCR Scandinavia Touring Car Championship	Lestrup Racing	16	2	1	1	8	204	5th
2022	24H TCE Series – TCE	Lestrup Racing	1	0	0	0	1	0	NC
2023	Lamborghini Super Trofeo Europe – Pro	Target Racing	12	1	0	0	3	45	6th
2023	Lamborghini Super Trofeo World Final – Pro	Target Racing	2	0	0	0	1	12	4th
2024	Lamborghini Super Trofeo Europe – Pro	Target Racing	11	1	0	0	6	111	**2nd**
2024	Lamborghini Super Trofeo World Final – Pro	Target Racing	2	0	0	0	0	11	6th
2024	Italian GT Endurance Championship – GT3 Pro-Am	AKM Motorsport	1	0	0	0	0	0	NC
2025	GT World Challenge Europe Endurance Cup	Walkenhorst Motorsport	5	0	0	0	0	0	NC
2025	GT World Challenge Europe Endurance Cup – Silver	Walkenhorst Motorsport	5	1	0	1	1	30	13th
2025	Nürburgring Langstrecken-Serie – VT2-FWD+4WD	Walkenhorst Motorsport	2	0	0	0	1	14	NC
2025	Nürburgring Langstrecken-Serie – SP9 Pro-Am	Walkenhorst Motorsport	2	0	0	0	1	3	NC
2025	24 Hours of Nürburgring – GT3 Pro-Am	Walkenhorst Motorsport	1	0	0	0	0	—N/a	DNF
2026	6H of Portimão	Comtoyou Racing	1	0	0	0	0	—N/a	4th
2026	GT World Challenge Europe Endurance Cup	Comtoyou Racing	5	0	0	0	0	0	NC
2026	GT World Challenge Europe Endurance Cup – Silver	Comtoyou Racing	5	0	0	0	1	39	9th
2026	GT World Challenge Europe Sprint Cup	Comtoyou Racing	10	0	0	0	0	0	NC
2026	GT World Challenge Europe Sprint Cup – Silver	Comtoyou Racing	10	1	2	0	3	67	4th

=== Complete ADAC Formula 4 Championship results ===
(key) (Races in bold indicate pole position) (Races in italics indicate fastest lap)

Year	Team	1	2	3	4	5	6	7	8	9	10	11	12	13	14	15	16	17	18	19	20	21	22	23	24	Pos	Points
2016	ADAC Berlin-Brandenburg e.V.	OSC1; 1 DNQ	OSC1; 2 DNQ	OSC1; 3 DNQ	SAC; 1; 12	SAC; 2 Ret	SAC; 3 Ret	LAU; 1 Ret	LAU; 2; 19	LAU; 3 Ret	OSC2; 1; 19	OSC2; 2; 23	OSC2; 3 Ret	RBR; 1; 18	RBR; 2; 12	RBR; 3; 31	NÜR; 1 Ret	NÜR; 2; 22	NÜR; 3; 22	ZAN; 1; 29	ZAN; 2; 15	ZAN; 3; 27	HOC; 1 Ret	HOC; 2; 10	HOC; 3 Ret	28th	1
2017	ADAC Berlin-Brandenburg e.V.	OSC1; 1; 8	OSC1; 2; 21	OSC1; 3; 2	LAU; 1; 13	LAU; 2 Ret	LAU; 3; 10	RBR; 1 Ret	RBR; 2; 16	RBR; 3; 17	OSC2; 1; 16	OSC2; 2; 14	OSC2; 3; 16	NÜR; 1; 16	NÜR; 2; 18	NÜR; 3; 13	SAC; 1 Ret	SAC; 2; 17	SAC; 3 Ret	HOC; 1; 15	HOC; 2; 12	HOC; 3; 8				18th	27

=== Complete Italian F4 Championship results ===
(key) (Races in bold indicate pole position) (Races in italics indicate fastest lap)

Year	Team	1	2	3	4	5	6	7	8	9	10	11	12	13	14	15	16	17	18	19	20	21	Pos	Points
2017	BWT Mücke Motorsport	MIS; 1; 15	MIS; 2; 13	MIS; 3; 16	ADR; 1	ADR; 2	ADR; 3	VLL; 1	VLL; 2	VLL; 3	MUG1; 1	MUG1; 2	MUG1; 3	IMO; 1	IMO; 2	IMO; 3	MUG2; 1	MUG2; 2	MUG2; 3	MNZ; 1	MNZ; 2	MNZ; 3	NC	0

=== Complete Scandinavian Touring Car Championship results ===
(key) (Races in bold indicate pole position) (Races in italics indicate fastest lap)

Year	Team	Car	1	2	3	4	5	6	7	8	9	10	11	12	13	14	15	16	17	18	DC	Points
2018	Lestrup Racing Team	Volkswagen Golf GTI TCR	KNU; 1; 8	KNU; 2; 15	AND; 1; 10	AND; 2; 10	FAL; 1 Ret	FAL; 2; 8	KAR; 1; 8	KAR; 2; 8	RUD; 1; 9	RUD; 2; 9	MAN; 1; 6	MAN; 2 Ret							11th	30
2020	Lestrup Racing Team	Volkswagen Golf GTI TCR	**KAR**; **1**; 1	KAR; 2; 3	KAR; 3; 4	SKE; 1; 5	SKE; 2; 5	SKE; 3; 4	MAN; 1 DNS^{2}	MAN; 2 Ret	MAN; 3; 9	KNU; 1; 3^{3}	KNU; 2 Ret	KNU; 3 Ret							5th	108
2021	Lestrup Racing Team by Volkswagen Stockholm	Volkswagen Golf GTI TCR	LJU; 1; 3	LJU; 2; 4^{4}	LJU; 3; 4	SKE; 1 NC	SKE; 2; 4	SKE; 3; 5	KAR; 1; 9	KAR; 2; 3^{3}	KAR; 3; 8	AND; 1; 3	AND; 2; 3^{4}	AND; 3; 6	MAN; 1; 5	MAN; 2; 2^{4}	MAN; 3; 4	KNU; 1; 4	KNU; 2; 6^{4}	KNU; 3; 6	4th	220
2022	Lestrup Racing Team	Audi RS 3 LMS TCR (2021)	LJU; 1; 3^{2}	SKE; 1; 2	SKE; 2; 3^{4}	SKE; 3; 3	KNU; 1; 2	KNU; 2; 5^{4}	KNU; 3; 6	KAR; 1; 1	KAR; 2 Ret^{3}	KAR; 3; 6	AND; 1; 4	AND; 2; 6	AND; 3 DSQ	MAN; 1; 1	MAN; 2; 2^{3}	MAN; 3; 14			5th	204

=== Complete GT4 European Series results ===
(key) (Races in bold indicate pole position) (Races in italics indicate fastest lap)

Year	Team	Car	Class	1	2	3	4	5	6	7	8	9	10	11	12	Pos	Points
2018	Lestrup Racing	BMW M4 GT4	Pro-Am	ZOL; 1	ZOL; 2	BRH; 1	BRH; 2	MIS; 1	MIS; 2	SPA; 1; 21	SPA; 2; 20	HUN; 1; 23	HUN; 2; 34	NÜR; 1; 36	NÜR; 2; 21	22nd	20
2019	Lestrup Racing	BMW M4 GT4	Silver	IMO; 1	IMO; 2	BRH; 1	BRH; 2	LEC; 1	LEC; 2	MIS; 1	MIS; 2	ZAN; 1	ZAN; 2	NÜR; 1; 14	NÜR; 2; 15	NC	0

=== Complete GT World Challenge Europe results ===
==== GT World Challenge Europe Endurance Cup ====
(key) (Races in bold indicate pole position) (Races in italics indicate fastest lap)

Year	Team	Car	Class	1	2	3	4	5	6	7	Pos.	Points
2025	Walkenhorst Motorsport	Aston Martin Vantage AMR GT3 Evo	Silver	LEC; 42	MNZ; 42	SPA; 6H; 35	SPA; 12H; 29	SPA; 24H; 14	NÜR; 47	CAT; Ret	13th	30
2026	Comtoyou Racing	Aston Martin Vantage AMR GT3 Evo	Silver	**LEC**; 20	MNZ; 27	SPA; 6H; 28	SPA; 12H; 59†	SPA; 24H; Ret	NÜR; 24	ALG; 32	9th	39

==== GT World Challenge Europe Sprint Cup ====
(key) (Races in bold indicate pole position) (Races in italics indicate fastest lap)

Year	Team	Car	Class	1	2	3	4	5	6	7	8	9	10	Pos.	Points
2026	Comtoyou Racing	Aston Martin Vantage AMR GT3 Evo	Silver	BRH; 1; 24	BRH; 2; 27	MIS; 1; 28	MIS; 2; 27	**MAG**; **1**; 27	MAG; 2; 15	ZAN; 1; 19	**ZAN**; **2**; 12	CAT; 1; 29	CAT; 2; 19	4th	67
