= 2013 Formula Renault 1.6 Nordic season =

The 2013 Formula Renault 1.6 Nordic season was the inaugural season of the Formula Renault 1.6 Nordic, a series running 1600cc Formula Renault machinery in similar fashion to the French F4 Championship. The series began on 3 May at Ring Knutstorp and ended on 21 September at Mantorp Park, after fifteen races held in seven venues. Most of these rounds were held in support of the 2013 Scandinavian Touring Car Championship season, joint organiser of the series along with the FIA Northern European Zone Organisation.

The series uses all-carbon Signatech chassis, 1.6-litre 140bhp Renault K4MRS engines, and Dunlop tyres.

== Drivers and teams ==
Team	No.	Drivers	Rounds
KOAN Event Racing	2	(Sweden) Otto Tjäder	All
Team TIDÖ	3	(Sweden) Erik Johansson	All
Sundahl Racing	4	(Sweden) Lukas Sundahl	All
Aabol Racing	6	(Norway) Kevin Aabol	All
Stuart Racing Team	7	(Netherlands) Indy Dontje	1
Stuart Racing Team	17	(Belgium) Yaro Deckers	1
Scuderia Nordica	8	(Sweden) Oliver Söderström	3–7
Scuderia Nordica	9	(Estonia) Martin Rump	All
Scuderia Nordica	10	(Estonia) Karl-Gustav Annus	All
Scuderia Nordica	14	(Estonia) Marcus Lukas Kiisa	2
BR Motorsport	14	(Sweden) Robin Hansson	7
Trackstar Racing	11	(Sweden) Pontus Fredricsson	All
Trackstar Racing	12	(New Zealand) (Sweden) Paul Blomqvist	All
Trackstar Racing	99	(Sweden) Karl Ero	6
Provily Racing	18	(Netherlands) Janneau Esmeijer	1
Supercar Experience	23	(Sweden) Kimmy Larsson	All
Jalkanen Racing	24	(Sweden) Mattias Jalkanen	1
Lyran Engineering	44	(Sweden) Rasmus Ericsson	1, 3–4, 6–7
Svensson Racing	47	(Sweden) Robert Svensson	All

== Race calendar and results ==
Except for the second round in Estonia, all rounds took place in Sweden. All Swedish rounds, except for the one in the Kinnekulle Ring, were held in support of the STCC championship.

Rounds denoted with a blue background were a part of the Formula Renault 1.6 NEZ Championship.

Round		Circuit	Date	Pole position	Fastest lap	Winning driver
1	R1	Ring Knutstorp, Kågeröd	3 May	(Sweden) Kimmy Larsson	(Estonia) Martin Rump	(Estonia) Martin Rump
1	R2	Ring Knutstorp, Kågeröd	4 May	(Estonia) Martin Rump	(Estonia) Martin Rump	(Estonia) Martin Rump
2	R1	Audru Ring, Audru	15 June	(Estonia) Martin Rump	(Sweden) Erik Johansson	(Sweden) Kimmy Larsson
2	R2	Audru Ring, Audru	15 June	(Sweden) Erik Johansson	(Estonia) Martin Rump	(Sweden) Kimmy Larsson
3	R1	Falkenbergs Motorbana, Bergagård	12 July	(Sweden) Erik Johansson	(Sweden) Erik Johansson	(Sweden) Erik Johansson
3	R2	Falkenbergs Motorbana, Bergagård	13 July	(Sweden) Erik Johansson	(Sweden) Erik Johansson	(Sweden) Erik Johansson
4	R1	Kinnekulle Ring, Kinnekulle	27 July	(Sweden) Lukas Sundahl	(Sweden) Lukas Sundahl	(Sweden) Lukas Sundahl
4	R2	Kinnekulle Ring, Kinnekulle	27 July	(Sweden) Lukas Sundahl	(Estonia) Martin Rump	(Estonia) Martin Rump
4	R3	Kinnekulle Ring, Kinnekulle	28 July	(Estonia) Martin Rump	(Estonia) Martin Rump	(Estonia) Martin Rump
5	R1	Airport Race Östersund, Östersund	10 August	(Sweden) Erik Johansson	(Sweden) Lukas Sundahl	(Sweden) Erik Johansson
5	R2	Airport Race Östersund, Östersund	10 August	(Sweden) Lukas Sundahl	(Estonia) Martin Rump	(Sweden) Erik Johansson
6	R1	Karlskoga Motorstadion, Karlskoga	23 August	(Estonia) Martin Rump	(Sweden) Lukas Sundahl	(New Zealand) Paul Blomqvist
6	R2	Karlskoga Motorstadion, Karlskoga	24 August	(Sweden) Lukas Sundahl	(Estonia) Martin Rump	(Sweden) Lukas Sundahl
7	R1	Mantorp Park, Mantorp	20 September	(Estonia) Martin Rump	(Estonia) Martin Rump	(Estonia) Martin Rump
7	R2	Mantorp Park, Mantorp	21 September	(Estonia) Martin Rump	(Sweden) Robin Hansson	(Sweden) Robin Hansson

== Championship standings ==
Points system

Points were awarded to the top 10 classified finishers. No points were awarded for pole or fastest lap.

Position	**1st**	**2nd**	**3rd**	**4th**	**5th**	**6th**	**7th**	**8th**	**9th**	**10th**
Points	25	18	15	12	10	8	6	4	2	1

Parallel to the main championship, two other championships were held: the Formula Renault 1.6 Junior Svenskt Mästerskap (JSM) for drivers under 26 years old holding a Swedish driver license, and the Formula Renault 1.6 Northern European Zone (NEZ) championship at selected rounds. Points to these championships were awarded using the same system.

=== Formula Renault 1.6 Nordic Championship ===
Pos	Driver	KNU		AUD		FAL		KIN			ÖST		KAR		MAN		Pts
1	(Sweden) Erik Johansson	3	DSQ	2	**3**	**1**	**1**	3	3	3	**1**	1	4	10	5	3	231
2	(Estonia) Martin Rump	1	**1**	**5**	2	3	2	2	1	**1**	Ret	11	**Ret**	3	**1**	**5**	229
3	(Sweden) Lukas Sundahl	8	6	3	4	2	Ret	**1**	**2**	2	3	**2**	2	**1**	6	4	214
4	(Sweden) Kimmy Larsson	**2**	2	1	1	4	5	4	4	5	Ret	7	6	9	3	2	191
5	(New Zealand) (Sweden) Paul Blomqvist	6	4	8	8	8	Ret	5	11	4	8	5	1	2	2	12	129
6	(Norway) Kevin Aabol	7	9	4	5	5	Ret	8	5	7	2	6	3	Ret	8	6	113
7	(Sweden) Robert Svensson	9	7	6	6	7	4	6	9	6	Ret	3	5	Ret	9	8	91
8	(Sweden) Pontus Fredricsson	10	11	Ret	9	6	3	7	7	9	4	4	7	DSQ	4	Ret	82
9	(Sweden) Oliver Söderström					10	7	10	6	8	5	8	10	5	13	9	47
10	(Sweden) Rasmus Ericsson	11	8			9	6	9	8	12			8	4	10	7	43
11	(Sweden) Robin Hansson														7	1	31
12	(Estonia) Karl-Gustav Annus	15	12	7	10	11	8	12	10	11	7	9	9	8	12	11	26
13	(Netherlands) Janneau Esmeijer	5	3														25
14	(Netherlands) Indy Dontje	4	5														22
15	(Sweden) Otto Tjäder	13	14	10	Ret	Ret	DNS	11	12	10	6	10	DNS	7	11	10	18
16	(Sweden) Karl Ero												Ret	6			8
17	(Estonia) Marcus Lukas Kiisa			9	7												8
18	(Belgium) Yaro Deckers	12	10														1
19	(Sweden) Mattias Jalkanen	14	13														0
Pos	Driver	KNU		AUD		FAL		KIN			ÖST		KAR		MAN		Pts

Colour	Result
Gold	Winner
Silver	Second place
Bronze	Third place
Green	Points classification
Blue	Non-points classification
Blue	Non-classified finish (NC)
Purple	Retired, not classified (Ret)
Red	Did not qualify (DNQ)
Red	Did not pre-qualify (DNPQ)
Black	Disqualified (DSQ)
White	Did not start (DNS)
White	Withdrew (WD)
White	Race cancelled (C)
Blank	Did not practice (DNP)
Blank	Did not arrive (DNA)
Blank	Excluded (EX)

**Bold** – Pole
Italics – Fastest Lap

=== Formula Renault 1.6 JSM Championship ===
Pos	Driver	KNU		AUD		FAL		KIN			ÖST		KAR		MAN		Pts
1	(Sweden) Erik Johansson	3	DSQ	2	3	1	1	3	3	3	1	1	4	10	5	3	254
2	(Sweden) Lukas Sundahl	8	6	3	4	2	Ret	1	2	2	3	2	2	1	6	4	251
3	(Sweden) Kimmy Larsson	2	2	1	1	4	5	4	4	5	Ret	7	6	9	3	2	229
4	(New Zealand) (Sweden) Paul Blomqvist	6	4	8	8	8	Ret	5	11	4	8	5	1	2	2	12	180
5	(Sweden) Robert Svensson	9	7	6	6	7	4	6	9	6	Ret	3	5	Ret	9	8	138
6	(Sweden) Pontus Fredricsson	10	11	Ret	9	6	3	7	7	9	4	4	7	DSQ	4	Ret	128
7	(Sweden) Rasmus Ericsson	11	8			9	6	9	8	12			8	4	10	7	83
8	(Sweden) Oliver Söderström					10	7	10	6	8	5	8	10	5	13	9	77
9	(Sweden) Otto Tjäder	13	14	10	Ret	Ret	DNS	11	12	10	6	10	DNS	7	11	10	52
10	(Sweden) Robin Hansson														7	1	33
11	(Sweden) Karl Ero												Ret	6			10
12	(Sweden) Mattias Jalkanen	14	13														8
Pos	Driver	KNU		AUD		FAL		KIN			ÖST		KAR		MAN		Pts

=== Formula Renault 1.6 NEZ Championship ===
Pos	Driver	AUD		Pts
1	(Sweden) Kimmy Larsson	1	1	50
2	(Sweden) Erik Johansson	2	**3**	33
3	(Estonia) Martin Rump	**5**	2	28
4	(Sweden) Lukas Sundahl	3	4	27
5	(Norway) Kevin Aabol	4	5	22
6	(Sweden) Robert Svensson	6	6	16
7	(Estonia) Marcus Lukas Kiisa	9	7	8
8	(New Zealand) (Sweden) Paul Blomqvist	8	8	8
9	(Estonia) Karl-Gustav Annus	7	10	7
10	(Sweden) Pontus Fredricsson	Ret	9	2
11	(Sweden) Otto Tjäder	10	Ret	1
Pos	Driver	AUD		Pts
