= 2020 ADAC GT Masters =

Motorsport season

The 2020 ADAC GT Masters was the fourteenth season of the ADAC GT Masters, the grand tourer-style sports car racing founded by the German automobile club ADAC.

== Entry list ==
Team	Car	No.	Driver	Class	Rounds
(Germany) Aust Motorsport	Audi R8 LMS Evo	3	(Germany) Maximilian Hackländer		All
(Germany) Aust Motorsport	Audi R8 LMS Evo	3	(Switzerland) Nikolaj Rogivue	J	All
(Germany) Aust Motorsport	Audi R8 LMS Evo	4	(Germany) Hendrik von Danwitz	J	All
(Germany) Aust Motorsport	Audi R8 LMS Evo	4	(Switzerland) Rahel Frey		1–2, 4–5, 7
(Germany) Aust Motorsport	Audi R8 LMS Evo	4	(Germany) Markus Winkelhock		3, 6
(Germany) Precote Herberth Motorsport	Porsche 911 GT3 R	7	(Germany) Sebastian Asch		All
(Germany) Precote Herberth Motorsport	Porsche 911 GT3 R	7	(Germany) Alfred Renauer		All
(Germany) Precote Herberth Motorsport	Porsche 911 GT3 R	99	(Germany) Robert Renauer		All
(Germany) Precote Herberth Motorsport	Porsche 911 GT3 R	99	(Germany) Sven Müller		1–5
(Germany) Precote Herberth Motorsport	Porsche 911 GT3 R	99	(Austria) Klaus Bachler		6
(Germany) Precote Herberth Motorsport	Porsche 911 GT3 R	99	(France) Mathieu Jaminet		7
(Germany) Rutronik Racing	Audi R8 LMS Evo	8	(Germany) Dennis Marschall	J	All
(Germany) Rutronik Racing	Audi R8 LMS Evo	8	(Germany) Carrie Schreiner	J	1–5, 7
(Germany) Rutronik Racing	Audi R8 LMS Evo	8	(Germany) Hamza Owega		6
(Germany) Rutronik Racing	Audi R8 LMS Evo	31	(South Africa) Kelvin van der Linde		All
(Germany) Rutronik Racing	Audi R8 LMS Evo	31	(Switzerland) Patric Niederhauser		All
(Germany) Schubert Motorsport	BMW M6 GT3	9	(Sweden) Joel Eriksson		All
(Germany) Schubert Motorsport	BMW M6 GT3	9	(Australia) Aidan Read	J	All
(Germany) Schubert Motorsport	BMW M6 GT3	10	(Sweden) Henric Skoog	J	All
(Germany) Schubert Motorsport	BMW M6 GT3	10	(United Kingdom) Nick Yelloly		1–3, 5, 7
(Germany) Schubert Motorsport	BMW M6 GT3	10	(Finland) Jesse Krohn		4
(Germany) Schubert Motorsport	BMW M6 GT3	10	(South Africa) Sheldon van der Linde		6
(Germany) EFP Car Collection by TECE	Audi R8 LMS Evo	11	(Germany) Elia Erhart	T	All
(Germany) EFP Car Collection by TECE	Audi R8 LMS Evo	11	(Germany) Pierre Kaffer		All
(Germany) EFP Car Collection by TECE	Audi R8 LMS Evo	12	(Germany) Mike David Ortmann	J	2
(Germany) EFP Car Collection by TECE	Audi R8 LMS Evo	12	(Germany) Markus Winkelhock		2
(Germany) MRS GT-Racing	BMW M6 GT3	14	(Germany) Jens Klingmann		1–5, 7
(Germany) MRS GT-Racing	BMW M6 GT3	14	(Denmark) Nicolai Sylvest	J	1
(Germany) MRS GT-Racing	BMW M6 GT3	14	(Sweden) Erik Johansson	J	2–7
(Germany) MRS GT-Racing	BMW M6 GT3	14	(Brazil) Augusto Farfus		6
(Germany) KÜS Team75 Bernhard	Porsche 911 GT3 R	17	(Austria) Klaus Bachler		1–5, 7
(Germany) KÜS Team75 Bernhard	Porsche 911 GT3 R	17	(Switzerland) Simona de Silvestro		1–5, 7
(Germany) KÜS Team75 Bernhard	Porsche 911 GT3 R	18	(Germany) Jannes Fittje	J	All
(Germany) KÜS Team75 Bernhard	Porsche 911 GT3 R	18	(Germany) David Jahn		All
(Germany) Space Drive Racing operated by KÜS Team75 Bernhard	Porsche 911 GT3 R (2017)	117	(Austria) Martin Ragginger		1
(Germany) Space Drive Racing operated by KÜS Team75 Bernhard	Porsche 911 GT3 R (2017)	117	(Austria) Norbert Siedler		1
(Austria) GRT Grasser Racing Team	Lamborghini Huracán GT3 Evo	19	(Belgium) Niels Lagrange		All
(Austria) GRT Grasser Racing Team	Lamborghini Huracán GT3 Evo	19	(Austria) Clemens Schmid		All
(Austria) GRT Grasser Racing Team	Lamborghini Huracán GT3 Evo	63	(Spain) Albert Costa		All
(Austria) GRT Grasser Racing Team	Lamborghini Huracán GT3 Evo	63	(France) Franck Perera		All
(Austria) GRT Grasser Racing Team	Lamborghini Huracán GT3 Evo	82	(Netherlands) Steijn Schothorst		All
(Austria) GRT Grasser Racing Team	Lamborghini Huracán GT3 Evo	82	(Germany) Tim Zimmermann	J	All
(Germany) Team Zakspeed BKK Mobil Oil Racing	Mercedes-AMG GT3 Evo	20	(France) Dorian Boccolacci		All
(Germany) Team Zakspeed BKK Mobil Oil Racing	Mercedes-AMG GT3 Evo	20	(Austria) Mick Wishofer	J	All
(Germany) Team Zakspeed BKK Mobil Oil Racing	Mercedes-AMG GT3 Evo	21	(Sweden) Jimmy Eriksson		All
(Germany) Team Zakspeed BKK Mobil Oil Racing	Mercedes-AMG GT3 Evo	21	(Germany) Daniel Keilwitz		1–5
(Germany) Team Zakspeed BKK Mobil Oil Racing	Mercedes-AMG GT3 Evo	21	(Germany) Hendrik Still		6–7
(Germany) Toksport WRT	Mercedes-AMG GT3 Evo	22	(Germany) Maro Engel		All
(Germany) Toksport WRT	Mercedes-AMG GT3 Evo	22	(Germany) Luca Stolz		All
(Germany) BWT Mücke Motorsport	Audi R8 LMS Evo	25	(Poland) Igor Waliłko	J	1–4
(Germany) BWT Mücke Motorsport	Audi R8 LMS Evo	25	(Germany) Mike Beckhusen	J	1–3
(Germany) BWT Mücke Motorsport	Audi R8 LMS Evo	25	(Germany) Mike David Ortmann	J	4
(Germany) BWT Mücke Motorsport	Audi R8 LMS Evo	26	(Switzerland) Ricardo Feller	J	All
(Germany) BWT Mücke Motorsport	Audi R8 LMS Evo	26	(Germany) Stefan Mücke		All
(Germany) Montaplast by Land-Motorsport	Audi R8 LMS Evo	28	(Germany) Christopher Haase		All
(Germany) Montaplast by Land-Motorsport	Audi R8 LMS Evo	28	(Austria) Max Hofer		All
(Germany) Montaplast by Land-Motorsport	Audi R8 LMS Evo	29	(Germany) Christopher Mies		All
(Germany) Montaplast by Land-Motorsport	Audi R8 LMS Evo	29	(Germany) Kim-Luis Schramm	J	All
(Belgium) Team WRT	Audi R8 LMS Evo	30	(Switzerland) Rolf Ineichen	T	1–5, 7
(Belgium) Team WRT	Audi R8 LMS Evo	30	(Italy) Mirko Bortolotti		1–3, 5, 7
(Belgium) Team WRT	Audi R8 LMS Evo	30	(Belgium) Frédéric Vervisch		4, 6
(Belgium) Team WRT	Audi R8 LMS Evo	30	(Denmark) Benjamin Goethe	J	6
(Belgium) Team WRT	Audi R8 LMS Evo	32	(Belgium) Dries Vanthoor		All
(Belgium) Team WRT	Audi R8 LMS Evo	32	(Belgium) Charles Weerts	J	All
(Belgium) Team WRT	Audi R8 LMS Evo	34	(Denmark) Benjamin Goethe	J	2
(Belgium) Team WRT	Audi R8 LMS Evo	34	(United Kingdom) Stuart Hall		2
(Czech Republic) Team ISR	Audi R8 LMS Evo	33	(Czech Republic) Filip Salaquarda	T	All
(Czech Republic) Team ISR	Audi R8 LMS Evo	33	(Germany) Frank Stippler		All
(Germany) Team mcchip-dkr	Lamborghini Huracán GT3 Evo	35	(Germany) Heiko Hammel		2
(Germany) Team mcchip-dkr	Lamborghini Huracán GT3 Evo	35	(Germany) 'Dieter Schmidtmann'	T	2
(Germany) Schütz Motorsport (Germany) DLV-Team Schütz Motorsport	Mercedes-AMG GT3	36	(Germany) Marvin Dienst	J	All
(Germany) Schütz Motorsport (Germany) DLV-Team Schütz Motorsport	Mercedes-AMG GT3	36	(Switzerland) Philipp Frommenwiler		All
(Germany) Mann-Filter - Team HTP-Winward	Mercedes-AMG GT3 Evo	47	(Netherlands) Indy Dontje		All
(Germany) Mann-Filter - Team HTP-Winward	Mercedes-AMG GT3 Evo	47	(Germany) Maximilian Götz		All
(Germany) Knaus - Team HTP-Winward	Mercedes-AMG GT3 Evo	48	(United Kingdom) Philip Ellis		All
(Germany) Knaus - Team HTP-Winward	Mercedes-AMG GT3 Evo	48	(Italy) Raffaele Marciello		All
(Germany) YACO Racing	Audi R8 LMS Evo	54	(Austria) Norbert Siedler		5
(Germany) YACO Racing	Audi R8 LMS Evo	54	(Austria) Simon Reicher	J	5
(Germany) T3-HRT-Motorsport	Audi R8 LMS Evo	71	(Netherlands) Niels Langeveld		All
(Germany) T3-HRT-Motorsport	Audi R8 LMS Evo	71	(Germany) Maximilian Paul	J	All
(Germany) T3-HRT-Motorsport	Bentley Continental GT3	72	(Austria) Constantin Schöll	J	All
(Germany) T3-HRT-Motorsport	Bentley Continental GT3	72	(South Africa) Jordan Pepper		1–3, 5–7
(Germany) T3-HRT-Motorsport	Bentley Continental GT3	72	(United Kingdom) Seb Morris		4
(Germany) Callaway Competition	Corvette C7 GT3-R	77	(Germany) Markus Pommer		All
(Germany) Callaway Competition	Corvette C7 GT3-R	77	(Switzerland) Jeffrey Schmidt		All
(Germany) Joos Sportwagentechnik	Porsche 911 GT3 R	91	(Germany) Michael Joos		2–3
(Germany) Joos Sportwagentechnik	Porsche 911 GT3 R	91	(France) Julien Andlauer		2
(Germany) Joos Sportwagentechnik	Porsche 911 GT3 R	91	(Germany) Marco Holzer		3
(Germany) SSR Performance	Porsche 911 GT3 R	92	(Germany) Michael Ammermüller		All
(Germany) SSR Performance	Porsche 911 GT3 R	92	(Germany) Christian Engelhart		All

Icon	Legend
J	Junior
T	Trophy

== Calendar and results ==
Rnd.	Race	Circuit	Date	Pole position	Race winner
1	1	(Germany) Lausitzring (Sprint Circuit)	1 August	(Germany) No. 22 Toksport WRT	(Germany) No. 22 Toksport WRT
1	1	(Germany) Lausitzring (Sprint Circuit)	1 August	(Germany) Maro Engel (Germany) Luca Stolz	(Germany) Maro Engel (Germany) Luca Stolz
1	2	(Germany) Lausitzring (Sprint Circuit)	2 August	(Belgium) No. 32 Team WRT	(Belgium) No. 32 Team WRT
1	2	(Germany) Lausitzring (Sprint Circuit)	2 August	(Belgium) Dries Vanthoor (Belgium) Charles Weerts	(Belgium) Dries Vanthoor (Belgium) Charles Weerts
2	3	(Germany) Nürburgring (Sprint Circuit)	15 August	(Germany) No. 92 SSR Performance	(Germany) No. 92 SSR Performance
2	3	(Germany) Nürburgring (Sprint Circuit)	15 August	(Germany) Michael Ammermüller (Germany) Christian Engelhart	(Germany) Michael Ammermüller (Germany) Christian Engelhart
2	4	(Germany) Nürburgring (Sprint Circuit)	16 August	(Germany) No. 31 Rutronik Racing	(Germany) No. 99 Precote Herberth Motorsport
2	4	(Germany) Nürburgring (Sprint Circuit)	16 August	(South Africa) Kelvin van der Linde (Switzerland) Patric Niederhauser	(Germany) Sven Müller (Germany) Robert Renauer
3	5	(Germany) Hockenheimring	19 September	(Germany) No. 8 Rutronik Racing	(Germany) No. 92 SSR Performance
3	5	(Germany) Hockenheimring	19 September	(Germany) Dennis Marschall (Germany) Carrie Schreiner	(Germany) Michael Ammermüller (Germany) Christian Engelhart
3	6	(Germany) Hockenheimring	20 September	(Austria) No. 82 GRT Grasser Racing Team	(Germany) No. 31 Rutronik Racing
3	6	(Germany) Hockenheimring	20 September	(Netherlands) Steijn Schothorst (Germany) Tim Zimmermann	(South Africa) Kelvin van der Linde (Switzerland) Patric Niederhauser
4	7	(Germany) Sachsenring	3 October	(Germany) No. 36 DLV-Team Schütz Motorsport	(Germany) No. 36 DLV-Team Schütz Motorsport
4	7	(Germany) Sachsenring	3 October	(Germany) Marvin Dienst (Switzerland) Philipp Frommenwiler	(Germany) Marvin Dienst (Switzerland) Philipp Frommenwiler
4	8	(Germany) Sachsenring	4 October	(Germany) No. 8 Rutronik Racing	(Germany) No. 77 Callaway Competition
4	8	(Germany) Sachsenring	4 October	(Germany) Dennis Marschall (Germany) Carrie Schreiner	(Germany) Markus Pommer (Switzerland) Jeffrey Schmidt
5	9	(Austria) Red Bull Ring	17 October	(Austria) No. 82 GRT Grasser Racing Team	(Germany) No. 10 Schubert Motorsport
5	9	(Austria) Red Bull Ring	17 October	(Netherlands) Steijn Schothorst (Germany) Tim Zimmermann	(Sweden) Henric Skoog (United Kingdom) Nick Yelloly
5	10	(Austria) Red Bull Ring	18 October	(Austria) No. 82 GRT Grasser Racing Team	(Germany) No. 14 MRS GT-Racing
5	10	(Austria) Red Bull Ring	18 October	(Netherlands) Steijn Schothorst (Germany) Tim Zimmermann	(Sweden) Erik Johansson (Germany) Jens Klingmann
6	11	(Germany) Lausitzring (Grand Prix Circuit)	31 October	(Germany) No. 99 Precote Herberth Motorsport	(Germany) No. 28 Montaplast by Land-Motorsport
6	11	(Germany) Lausitzring (Grand Prix Circuit)	31 October	(Austria) Klaus Bachler (Germany) Robert Renauer	(Germany) Christopher Haase (Austria) Max Hofer
6	12	(Germany) Lausitzring (Grand Prix Circuit)	1 November	(Belgium) No. 30 Team WRT	(Germany) No. 20 Team Zakspeed BKK Mobil Oil Racing
6	12	(Germany) Lausitzring (Grand Prix Circuit)	1 November	(Denmark) Benjamin Goethe (Belgium) Frédéric Vervisch	(France) Dorian Boccolacci (Austria) Mick Wishofer
7	13	(Germany) Motorsport Arena Oschersleben	7 November	(Germany) No. 92 SSR Performance	(Germany) No. 92 SSR Performance
7	13	(Germany) Motorsport Arena Oschersleben	7 November	(Germany) Michael Ammermüller (Germany) Christian Engelhart	(Germany) Michael Ammermüller (Germany) Christian Engelhart
7	14	(Germany) Motorsport Arena Oschersleben	8 November	(Germany) No. 48 Knaus - Team HTP Winward	(Germany) No. 48 Knaus - Team HTP Winward
7	14	(Germany) Motorsport Arena Oschersleben	8 November	(United Kingdom) Philip Ellis (Italy) Raffaele Marciello	(United Kingdom) Philip Ellis (Italy) Raffaele Marciello

== Championship standings ==
Scoring system

Championship points are awarded for the first fifteen positions in each race. Entries are required to complete 75% of the winning car's race distance in order to be classified and earn points. Individual drivers are required to participate for a minimum of 25 minutes in order to earn championship points in any race.

Position	**1st**	**2nd**	**3rd**	**4th**	**5th**	**6th**	**7th**	**8th**	**9th**	**10th**	**11th**	**12th**	**13th**	**14th**	**15th**
Points	25	20	16	13	11	10	9	8	7	6	5	4	3	2	1

=== Drivers' championships ===
==== Overall ====
Pos.	Driver	Team	LAU1 (Germany)		NÜR (Germany)		HOC (Germany)		SAC (Germany)		RBR (Austria)		LAU2 (Germany)		OSC (Germany)		Points
1	(Germany) Michael Ammermüller (Germany) Christian Engelhart	(Germany) SSR Performance	2	4	**1**	16	1	18	6	6	5	4	6	11	**1**	4	181
2	(Germany) Robert Renauer	(Germany) Precote Herberth Motorsport	Ret	3	7	1	7	6	2	Ret	2	Ret	**3**	2	5	3	172
3	(Germany) Maro Engel (Germany) Luca Stolz	(Germany) Toksport WRT	**1**	2	2	7	18	9	3	Ret	10	2	Ret	4	2	5	167
4	(South Africa) Kelvin van der Linde (Switzerland) Patric Niederhauser	(Germany) Rutronik Racing	6	5	3	**10**	2	1	7	3	8	8	5	6	6	Ret	160
5	(Germany) Christopher Haase (Austria) Max Hofer	(Germany) Montaplast by Land-Motorsport	3	14	Ret	6	8	2	15	4	20	6	1	12	4	11	127
6	(United Kingdom) Philip Ellis (Italy) Raffaele Marciello	(Germany) Knaus - Team HTP-Winward	18	10	6	8	6	7	Ret	5	6	10	15	Ret	3	**1**	112
7	(Germany) Sven Müller	(Germany) Precote Herberth Motorsport	Ret	3	7	1	7	6	2	Ret	2	Ret					109
8	(Spain) Albert Costa (France) Franck Perera	(Austria) GRT Grasser Racing Team	5	27†	10	3	5	8	29†	10	4	3	13	8	12	22	102
9	(Netherlands) Indy Dontje (Germany) Maximilian Götz	(Germany) Mann-Filter Team HTP-Winward	7	8	26	14	9	4	18	Ret	13	16	2	5	10	9	87
10	(Belgium) Dries Vanthoor (Belgium) Charles Weerts	(Belgium) Team WRT	20	**1**	Ret	2	14	DSQ	11	2	WD	WD	23	26	15	7	82
11	(Austria) Klaus Bachler	(Germany) KÜS Team75 Bernhard	19	16	4	17	4	27†	9	Ret	18	DNS			8	Ret	77
11	(Austria) Klaus Bachler	(Germany) Precote Herberth Motorsport											**3**	2			77
12	(France) Dorian Boccolacci (Austria) Mick Wishofer	(Germany) Team Zakspeed BKK Mobil Oil Racing	11	15	5	11	17	16	5	17	Ret	15	DSQ	1	Ret	6	70
13	(Netherlands) Steijn Schothorst (Germany) Tim Zimmermann	(Austria) GRT Grasser Racing Team	15	19	15	9	3	**5**	4	Ret	**7**	**9**	21	14	17	Ret	67
14	(Switzerland) Rolf Ineichen	(Belgium) Team WRT	Ret	7	18	4	Ret	3	22	12	WD	WD			16	2	62
15	(Germany) Markus Pommer (Switzerland) Jeffrey Schmidt	(Germany) Callaway Competition	Ret	12	Ret	5	Ret	Ret	8	1	21	18	8	18	13	14	61
16	(Italy) Mirko Bortolotti	(Belgium) Team WRT	Ret	7	18	4	Ret	3			WD	WD			16	2	58
17	(Germany) Jannes Fittje (Germany) David Jahn	(Germany) KÜS Team75 Bernhard	4	11	14	18	12	11	31†	14	16	12	4	Ret	14	8	58
18	(Sweden) Henric Skoog	(Germany) Schubert Motorsport	23	Ret	27	21	15	22	20	7	1	5	18	10	Ret	12	56
19	(Germany) Jens Klingmann	(Germany) MRS GT-Racing	Ret	Ret	19	31	24	25	10	9	3	1			WD	WD	54
19	(Sweden) Erik Johansson	(Germany) MRS GT-Racing			19	31	24	25	10	9	3	1	Ret	21	WD	WD	54
20	(Germany) Marvin Dienst (Switzerland) Philipp Frommenwiler	(Germany) Schütz Motorsport (Germany) DLV-Team Schütz Motorsport	9	13	9	25	19	Ret	**1**	Ret	Ret	DNS	14	7	DSQ	16	53
21	(Germany) Sebastian Asch (Germany) Alfred Renauer	(Germany) Precote Herberth Motorsport	10	18	13	13	Ret	Ret	13	Ret	23	19	12	3	9	Ret	43
22	(United Kingdom) Nick Yelloly	(Germany) Schubert Motorsport	23	Ret	27	21	15	22			1	5			Ret	12	41
23	(Switzerland) Simona de Silvestro	(Germany) KÜS Team75 Bernhard	19	16	4	17	4	27†	9	Ret	18	DNS			8	Ret	41
24	(Germany) Dennis Marschall	(Germany) Rutronik Racing	Ret	Ret	8	26	**10**	17	21	**8**	22	14	7	27†	25	19	33
25	(Switzerland) Ricardo Feller (Germany) Stefan Mücke	(Germany) BWT Mücke Motorsport	17	22	25	Ret	11	21	17	Ret	19	11	9	17	7	10	32
26	(Germany) Christopher Mies (Germany) Kim-Luis Schramm	(Germany) Montaplast by Land-Motorsport	26	6	30†	20	13	10	12	Ret	15	Ret	Ret	16	11	Ret	29
27	(France) Mathieu Jaminet	(Germany) Precote Herberth Motorsport													5	3	27
28	(Germany) Carrie Schreiner	(Germany) Rutronik Racing	Ret	Ret	8	26	**10**	17	21	**8**	22	14			25	19	24
29	(Sweden) Jimmy Eriksson	(Germany) Team Zakspeed BKK Mobil Oil Racing	25	9	11	32	16	14	14	Ret	WD	WD	16	13	20	13	23
30	(Netherlands) Niels Langeveld (Germany) Maximilian Paul	(Germany) T3-HRT-Motorsport	12	21	12	23	23	19	27	11	12	17	11	22	Ret	Ret	22
31	(Germany) Daniel Keilwitz	(Germany) Team Zakspeed BKK Mobil Oil Racing	25	9	11	32	16	14	14	Ret	WD	WD					17
32	(Czech Republic) Filip Salaquarda (Germany) Frank Stippler	(Czech Republic) Team ISR	8	20	16	24	27	13	16	20	26†	13	Ret	19	22	DNS	15
33	(Belgium) Niels Lagrange (Austria) Clemens Schmid	(Austria) GRT Grasser Racing Team	14	29†	23	15	Ret	29†	25	13	9	Ret	24†	20	18	15	15
34	(Germany) Maximilian Hackländer (Switzerland) Nikolaj Rogivue	(Germany) Aust Motorsport	22	23	20	22	29	23	23	19	14	7	17	Ret	Ret	20	11
35	(Belgium) Frédéric Vervisch	(Belgium) Team WRT							22	12			22	**9**			11
36	(Finland) Jesse Krohn	(Germany) Schubert Motorsport							20	7							9
36	(Germany) Hamza Owega	(Germany) Rutronik Racing											7	27†			9
37	(Sweden) Joel Eriksson (Australia) Aidan Read	(Germany) Schubert Motorsport	27	25	24	19	22	15	30†	15	11	Ret	19	24	19	Ret	8
38	(Austria) Constantin Schöll	(Germany) T3-HRT-Motorsport	21	Ret	Ret	30	26	28	26	Ret	DSQ	Ret	10	15	23	17	7
38	(South Africa) Jordan Pepper	(Germany) T3-HRT-Motorsport	21	Ret	Ret	30	26	28			DSQ	Ret	10	15	23	17	7
39	(South Africa) Sheldon van der Linde	(Germany) Schubert Motorsport											18	10			6
40	(Germany) Hendrik Still	(Germany) Team Zakspeed BKK Mobil Oil Racing											16	13	20	13	6
41	(Germany) Elia Erhart (Germany) Pierre Kaffer	(Germany) EFP Car Collection by TECE	13	17	21	33	25	20	24	16	17	20	20	25	21	18	3
	(Poland) Igor Waliłko	(Germany) BWT Mücke Motorsport	28	28	22	28	28	24	19	18							0
	(Germany) Mike David Ortmann	(Germany) BWT Mücke Motorsport							19	18							0
	(Germany) Hendrik von Danwitz	(Germany) Aust Motorsport	24	26	Ret	34	21	26	28	21	25	21†	Ret	23	24	21	0
	(Switzerland) Rahel Frey	(Germany) Aust Motorsport	24	26	Ret	34			28	21	25	21†			24	21	0
	(Germany) Markus Winkelhock	(Germany) Aust Motorsport					21	26					Ret	23			0
	(Brazil) Augusto Farfus	(Germany) MRS GT-Racing											Ret	21			0
	(Germany) Mike Beckhusen	(Germany) BWT Mücke Motorsport	28	28	22	28	28	24									0
	(United Kingdom) Seb Morris	(Germany) T3-HRT-Motorsport							26	Ret							0
	(Denmark) Nicolai Sylvest	(Germany) MRS GT-Racing	Ret	Ret													0
Drivers ineligible to score points
–	(Denmark) Benjamin Goethe	(Belgium) Team WRT			29	29							22	**9**			–
–	(Germany) Michael Joos	(Germany) Joos Sportwagentechnik			17	12	20	12									–
–	(France) Julien Andlauer	(Germany) Joos Sportwagentechnik			17	12											–
–	(Germany) Marco Holzer	(Germany) Joos Sportwagentechnik					20	12									–
–	(Austria) Martin Ragginger (Austria) Norbert Siedler	(Germany) Space Drive Racing by KÜS Team75 Bernhard	16	24													–
–	(Austria) Norbert Siedler (Austria) Simon Reicher	(Germany) YACO Racing									24	Ret					–
–	(Germany) Mike David Ortmann (Germany) Markus Winkelhock	(Germany) EFP Car Collection by TECE			28	27											–
–	(United Kingdom) Stuart Hall	(Belgium) Team WRT			29	29											–
–	(Germany) Heiko Hammel (Germany) 'Dieter Schmidtmann'	(Germany) Team mcchip-dkr			WD	WD											–
Pos.	Driver	Team	LAU1 (Germany)		NÜR (Germany)		HOC (Germany)		SAC (Germany)		RBR (Austria)		LAU2 (Germany)		OSC (Germany)		Points

Key
Colour	Result
Gold	Race winner
Silver	2nd place
Bronze	3rd place
Green	Points finish
Blue	Non-points finish
Blue	Non-classified finish (NC)
Purple	Did not finish (Ret)
Black	Disqualified (DSQ)
Black	Excluded (EX)
White	Did not start (DNS)
White	Race cancelled (C)
White	Withdrew (WD)
Blank	Did not participate

**Bold** – Pole
Italics – Fastest Lap

==== Junior Cup ====
Pos.	Driver	Team	Points
1	(Germany) Tim Zimmermann	(Austria) GRT Grasser Racing Team	270
2	(Germany) Jannes Fittje	(Germany) KÜS Team75 Bernhard	268.5
3	(Germany) Dennis Marschall	(Germany) Rutronik Racing	195
4	(Germany) Marvin Dienst	(Germany) DLV-Team Schütz Motorsport	190.5
5	(Austria) Mick Wishofer	(Germany) Team Zakspeed BKK Mobil Oil Racing	169
6	(Germany) Carrie Schreiner	(Germany) Rutronik Racing	160.5
7	(Germany) Maximilian Paul	(Germany) T3-HRT Motorsport	157.5
8	(Belgium) Charles Weerts	(Belgium) Team WRT	147
9	(Sweden) Henric Skoog	(Germany) Schubert Motorsport	142
10	(Switzerland) Ricardo Feller	(Germany) BWT Mücke Motorsport	137
11	(Switzerland) Nikolaj Rogivue	(Germany) Aust Motorsport	133.5
12	(Germany) Kim-Luis Schramm	(Germany) Montaplast by Land-Motorsport	116
13	(Sweden) Erik Johansson	(Germany) MRS GT-Racing	96
14	(Australia) Aidan Read	(Germany) Schubert Motorsport	89
15	(Germany) Hendrik von Danwitz	(Germany) Aust Motorsport	78
16	(Austria) Constantin Schöll	(Germany) T3-HRT Motorsport	60
17	(Poland) Igor Waliłko	(Germany) BWT Mücke Motorsport	52
18	(Germany) Mike David Ortmann	(Germany) EFP Car Collection by TECE (Germany) BWT Mücke Motorsport	29.5
19	(Germany) Mike Beckhusen	(Germany) BWT Mücke Motorsport	28
20	(Denmark) Nicolai Sylvest	(Germany) MRS GT-Racing	0
Drivers ineligible to score points
–	(Denmark) Benjamin Goethe	(Belgium) Team WRT	–
–	(Austria) Simon Reicher	(Germany) YACO Racing	–
Pos.	Driver	Team	Points

==== Trophy Cup ====
Pos.	Driver	Team	Points
1	(Germany) Elia Erhart	(Germany) EFP Car Collection by TECE	370.5
2	(Czech Republic) Filip Salaquarda	(Czech Republic) Team ISR	253
3	(Switzerland) Rolf Ineichen	(Belgium) Team WRT	190
Drivers ineligible to score points
–	(Germany) 'Dieter Schidtmann'	(Germany) Team mcchip-dkr	–

=== Teams' championship ===
Pos.	Team	Manufacturer	Points
1	(Germany) SSR Performance	Porsche	189
3	(Germany) Precote Herberth Motorsport	Porsche	179
3	(Germany) Toksport WRT	Mercedes-AMG	177
4	(Germany) Rutronik Racing	Audi	164
5	(Germany) Montaplast by Land-Motorsport	Audi	146
6	(Austria) GRT Grasser Racing Team	Lamborghini	136
7	(Belgium) Team WRT	Audi	128
8	(Germany) Knaus - Team HTP-Winward	Mercedes-AMG	120
9	(Germany) KÜS Team75 Bernhard	Porsche	106
10	(Germany) Mann-Filter Team HTP-Winward	Mercedes-AMG	102
11	(Germany) Team Zakspeed BKK Mobil Oil Racing	Mercedes-AMG	97
12	(Germany) Schubert Motorsport	BMW	73
13	(Germany) Callaway Competition	Chevrolet	71
14	(Germany) DLV-Team Schütz Motorsport	Mercedes-AMG	63
15	(Germany) MRS GT-Racing	BMW	58
16	(Germany) BWT Mücke Motorsport	Audi	47
17	(Germany) T3-HRT-Motorsport	Audi; Bentley	39
18	(Czech Republic) Team ISR	Audi	28
19	(Germany) Aust Motorsport	Audi	22
20	(Germany) EFP Car Collection by TECE	Audi	15
Teams ineligible to score points
–	(Germany) Joos Sportwagentechnik	Porsche	–
–	(Germany) Space Drive Racing by KÜS Team75 Bernhard	Porsche	–
–	(Germany) YACO Racing	Audi	–
–	(Germany) Team mcchip-dkr	Lamborghini	–
Pos.	Team	Manufacturer	Points

== Bibliography ==
- Tim Upietz; Oliver Runschke (2020). ADAC GT Masters Jahrbuch 2020 (in German). Duisburg: Gruppe C Motorsport Verlag. p. 224. ISBN 978-3-948501-09-9.
