= Martin Rump =

Estonian racing driver

- Martin Rump driving with Porsche 911 in 2022 24 Hours of Le Mans
- Nationality: (Estonia) Estonian
- Born: 2 April 1996 (age 30) Tallinn, Estonia

European Le Mans Series career
- Debut season: 2022
- Current team: Proton Competition
- Categorisation: FIA Silver
- Car number: 93
- Former teams: Absolute Racing
- Starts: 9
- Wins: 0
- Podiums: 2
- Poles: 0
- Fastest laps: 1
- Best finish: 7th (LMGTE) in 2022

24 Hours of Le Mans career
- Years: 2022, 2023
- Teams: Hardpoint Motorsport; Proton Competition
- Best finish: 44th (2022)

Martin Rump (born 2 April 1996) is an Estonian racing driver. He is the first Estonian to compete in the 24 Hours of Le Mans. He is currently competing in European Le Mans Series with Proton Competition.

Rump participated in endurance events such as the European Le Mans Series, the Asian Le Mans Series and the Intercontinental GT Challenge. Currently he is racing in European Le Mans Series.

== Racing record ==
=== Career summary ===
Season	Series	Team	Races	Wins	Poles	F/Laps	Podiums	Points	Position
2011	Formula Renault 2.0 Northern European Cup	Koiranen Junior	3	0	0	0	0	0	42nd
2013	Formula Renault 1.6 Nordic	Scuderia Nordica	14	5	6	8	10	229	**2nd**
2013	Formula Renault 1.6 NEC	Scuderia Nordica	12	5	2	4	10	288	**2nd**
2014	Toyota Racing Series	Giles Motorsport	14	2	3	3	5	629	5th
2014	Eurocup Formula Renault 2.0	Fortec Motorsports	14	0	0	0	0	8	20th
2014	Formula Renault 2.0 Alps Series	Fortec Motorsports	4	0	0	0	0	0	NC†
2015	Formula Masters China	Cebu Pacific Air by KCMG	18	10	7	10	16	274	**1st**
2015	Audi R8 LMS Cup China	Audi ThinkPad Racing Team	2	0	0	0	0	20	15th
2015–16	Asian Le Mans Series - GT Am	KCMG	1	1	1	0	1	26	**3rd**
2016	Audi R8 LMS Cup China	Champion Racing Team	12	4	1	4	6	160	**3rd**
2016–17	Asian Le Mans Series - LMP3	PRT Racing	2	0	0	0	0	10	14th
2017	Blancpain GT Series Asia - GT3	KCMG by Champion Racing	9	0	0	2	1	29	19th
2017	Audi R8 LMS Cup	Champion Racing Team	10	0	1	0	1	76	6th
2017	China GT Championship - GT3	KINGS	12	3	0	2	6	160	4th
2018	Blancpain GT Series Asia - GT3	Absolute Racing	12	1	1	0	2	116	4th
2019	Blancpain GT World Challenge Asia - GT3	Audi Sport Asia Team Absolute Racing	12	2	2	0	4	115	7th
2021	GT World Challenge Europe Endurance Cup	Vincenzo Sospiri Racing	1	0	0	0	0	0	NC
2021	24H GT Series - P4	Car Collection Motorsport	1	0	0	0	0	0	NC†
2022	European Le Mans Series - LMGTE	Absolute Racing	6	0	0	0	1	49	7th
2022	24 Hours of Le Mans - LMGTE Am	Hardpoint Motorsport	1	0	0	0	0	N/A	11th
2023	European Le Mans Series - LMGTE	Proton Competition	6	0	0	1	1	22	13th
2023	24 Hours of Le Mans - LMGTE Am	Proton Competition	1	0	0	0	0	N/A	DNF
2023	24 Hours of Nürburgring - SP10	KCMG	1	0	0	0	1	N/A	**2nd**
2023	Nürburgring Endurance Series - SP10	KCMG	3	1	1	0	1	21	7th
2024	24H Series - GT3	EBM							
2024	GT World Challenge Europe Endurance Cup	Lionspeed x Herberth	1	0	0	0	0	0	NC
2024	Nürburgring Langstrecken-Serie - Cup2	Mühlner Motorsport							
2024	992 Endurance Cup	Mühlner Motorsport	1	0	0	0	0	N/A	5th
2025	24H Series - 992	Mühlner Motorsport							
2025	Nürburgring Langstrecken-Serie - Cup2	Mühlner Motorsport							
2025	24 Hours of Nürburgring - Cup2	Mühlner Motorsport							
2025	GT World Challenge Europe Endurance Cup	Rutronik Racing	1	0	0	0	0	0	NC
2026	24H Series - 992	Mühlner Motorsport							
2026	Nürburgring Langstrecken-Serie - Cup2	Mühlner Motorsport							
2026	Nürburgring Langstrecken-Serie - SP9	Mühlner Motorsport							
2026	24 Hours of Nürburgring - SP9 Pro-Am	Mühlner Motorsport	1	0	0	0	1	N/A	**3rd**
2026	GT World Challenge Europe Endurance Cup	Rutronik Racing	1	0	0	0	0	0	NC

† As Rump was a guest driver, he was ineligible to score points.

=== Complete Formula Renault 2.0 NEC results ===
(key) (Races in bold indicate pole position) (Races in italics indicate fastest lap)

Year	Entrant	1	2	3	4	5	6	7	8	9	10	11	12	13	14	15	16	17	18	19	20	DC	Points
2011	Koiranen Junior	HOC; 1	HOC; 2	HOC; 3	SPA; 1	SPA; 2	NÜR; 1	NÜR; 2	ASS; 1	ASS; 2	ASS; 3	OSC; 1	OSC; 2	ZAN; 1	ZAN; 2	MST; 1; 12	MST; 2; 14	MST; 3; 21	MNZ; 1	MNZ; 2	MNZ; 3	42nd	16

=== Complete Eurocup Formula Renault 2.0 results ===
(key) (Races in bold indicate pole position; races in italics indicate fastest lap)

Year	Entrant	1	2	3	4	5	6	7	8	9	10	11	12	13	14	DC	Points
2014	Fortec Motorsports	ALC; 1 Ret	ALC; 2; 17	SPA; 1; 14	SPA; 2; 26	MSC; 1; 22	MSC; 2; 19	NÜR; 1; 12	NÜR; 2; 8	HUN; 1; 16	HUN; 2 Ret	LEC; 1; 11	LEC; 2 Ret	JER; 1; 15	JER; 2 Ret	20th	8

=== Complete Formula Renault 2.0 Alps Series results ===
(key) (Races in bold indicate pole position; races in italics indicate fastest lap)

Year	Team	1	2	3	4	5	6	7	8	9	10	11	12	13	14	Pos	Points
2014	Fortec Motorsports	IMO; 1 Ret	IMO; 2; 12	PAU; 1	PAU; 2	RBR; 1	RBR; 2	SPA; 1	SPA; 2	MNZ; 1	MNZ; 2	MUG; 1	MUG; 2	JER; 1; 26	JER; 2 Ret	NC†	0

† As Rump was a guest driver, he was ineligible for points

=== Complete 24 Hours of Le Mans results ===
Year	Team	Co-Drivers	Car	Class	Laps	Pos.	Class Pos.
2022	(United States) Hardpoint Motorsport	(Indonesia) Andrew Haryanto (Belgium) Alessio Picariello	Porsche 911 RSR-19	GTE; Am	338	44th	11th
2023	(Germany) Proton Competition	(Republic of Ireland) Michael Fassbender (Austria) Richard Lietz	Porsche 911 RSR-19	LMGTE; Am	246	DNF	DNF

=== Complete European Le Mans Series results ===
(key) (Races in bold indicate pole position; results in italics indicate fastest lap)

Year	Entrant	Class	Chassis	Engine	1	2	3	4	5	6	Rank	Points
2022	Absolute Racing	LMGTE	Porsche 911 RSR-19	Porsche 4.2 L Flat-6	LEC; 8	IMO; Ret	MNZ; 4	CAT; 5	SPA; 3	ALG; 6	7th	49
2023	Proton Competition	LMGTE	Porsche 911 RSR-19	Porsche 4.2 L Flat-6	CAT; 8	LEC; 10	ARA; 3	SPA; Ret	PRT; 9	ALG; 11	13th	22
