= 2024 24H Series =

International motorsport

The 2024 24H Series powered by Hankook was the tenth season of the 24H Series with drivers battling for championship points and titles, and the fifteenth season since Creventic, the organiser and promoter of the series, organises multiple races a year. The races are contested with GT3-spec cars, GT4-spec cars, sports cars and 24H-Specials, like silhouette cars, TCR Touring Cars, TCX cars and TC cars.

== Calendar ==
| Round | Event | Circuit | Date |
|---|---|---|---|
| 1 | 12 Hours of Mugello | Mugello Circuit, Scarperia e San Piero, Italy | 23–24 March |
| 2 | 12 Hours of Spa-Francorchamps | Circuit de Spa-Francorchamps, Stavelot, Belgium | 20–21 April |
| 3 | 24 Hours of Portimão | Algarve International Circuit, Portimão, Portugal | 10–12 May |
| 4 | 12 Hours of Misano | Misano World Circuit Marco Simoncelli, Misano Adriatico, Italy | 6–7 July |
| 5 | 24 Hours of Barcelona | Circuit de Barcelona-Catalunya, Montmeló, Spain | 13–15 September |

== Teams and drivers ==
| Team | Car | Engine | No. | Drivers | Class | Rounds |
GT3
| (Antigua and Barbuda) HAAS RT | Audi R8 LMS Evo II | Audi 5.2 L V10 | 1 | (Belgium) Xavier Knauf | Am | 2 |
| (Antigua and Barbuda) HAAS RT | Audi R8 LMS Evo II | Audi 5.2 L V10 | 1 | (Switzerland) Tim Müller | Am | 2 |
| (Antigua and Barbuda) HAAS RT | Audi R8 LMS Evo II | Audi 5.2 L V10 | 1 | (Belgium) Gregory Servais | Am | 2 |
| (Antigua and Barbuda) HAAS RT | Audi R8 LMS Evo II | Audi 5.2 L V10 | 1 | (Australia) Theo Koundouris | Am | 4 |
| (Antigua and Barbuda) HAAS RT | Audi R8 LMS Evo II | Audi 5.2 L V10 | 1 | (Australia) Sergio Pires | Am | 4 |
| (Antigua and Barbuda) HAAS RT | Audi R8 LMS Evo II | Audi 5.2 L V10 | 1 | (Australia) Marcel Zalloua | Am | 4 |
| (United Kingdom) Optimum Motorsport | McLaren 720S GT3 Evo | McLaren M840T 4.0 L Turbo V8 | 4 | (United States) Todd Coleman | P | 5 |
| (United Kingdom) Optimum Motorsport | McLaren 720S GT3 Evo | McLaren M840T 4.0 L Turbo V8 | 4 | (United States) Robert Megennis | P | 5 |
| (United Kingdom) Optimum Motorsport | McLaren 720S GT3 Evo | McLaren M840T 4.0 L Turbo V8 | 4 | (Denmark) Frederik Schandorff | P | 5 |
| (United Kingdom) Optimum Motorsport | McLaren 720S GT3 Evo | McLaren M840T 4.0 L Turbo V8 | 4 | (United States) Aaron Telitz | P | 5 |
| (Switzerland) / Kessel Racing (Note: Car No. 5 entered as Kessel Racing, and Car No. 8 entered as Boem by Kessel Racing.); (Switzerland) / Boem by Kessel Racing | Ferrari 488 GT3 Evo 2020 | Ferrari F154CB 3.9 L Turbo V8 | 5 | (Switzerland) Alexandre Bochez | Am | 1 |
| (Switzerland) / Kessel Racing; (Switzerland) / Boem by Kessel Racing | Ferrari 488 GT3 Evo 2020 | Ferrari F154CB 3.9 L Turbo V8 | 5 | (Switzerland) Mickaël Bochez | Am | 1 |
| (Switzerland) / Kessel Racing; (Switzerland) / Boem by Kessel Racing | Ferrari 488 GT3 Evo 2020 | Ferrari F154CB 3.9 L Turbo V8 | 5 | (Turkey) Murat Cahadaroglu | Am | 1 |
| (Switzerland) / Kessel Racing; (Switzerland) / Boem by Kessel Racing | Ferrari 488 GT3 Evo 2020 | Ferrari F154CB 3.9 L Turbo V8 | 5 | (Italy) Felice Jelmini | Am | 1 |
| (Switzerland) / Kessel Racing; (Switzerland) / Boem by Kessel Racing | Ferrari 296 GT3 | Ferrari F163 3.0 L Twin Turbo V6 | 5 | (United Kingdom) Andrew Gilbert | Am | 2 |
| (Switzerland) / Kessel Racing; (Switzerland) / Boem by Kessel Racing | Ferrari 296 GT3 | Ferrari F163 3.0 L Twin Turbo V6 | 5 | (Switzerland) Nicolò Rosi | Am | 2 |
| (Switzerland) / Kessel Racing; (Switzerland) / Boem by Kessel Racing | Ferrari 296 GT3 | Ferrari F163 3.0 L Twin Turbo V6 | 5 | (Spain) Fran Rueda | Am | 2 |
| (Switzerland) / Kessel Racing; (Switzerland) / Boem by Kessel Racing | Ferrari 296 GT3 | Ferrari F163 3.0 L Twin Turbo V6 | 5 | (Netherlands) Fons Scheltema | Am | 2 |
| (Switzerland) / Kessel Racing; (Switzerland) / Boem by Kessel Racing | Ferrari 296 GT3 | Ferrari F163 3.0 L Twin Turbo V6 | 8 | (Italy) Alessandro Cutrera | PA 1 P 1 | 1, 4 |
| (Switzerland) / Kessel Racing; (Switzerland) / Boem by Kessel Racing | Ferrari 296 GT3 | Ferrari F163 3.0 L Twin Turbo V6 | 8 | (Italy) Leonardo-Maria del Vecchio | PA 1 P 1 | 1, 4 |
| (Switzerland) / Kessel Racing; (Switzerland) / Boem by Kessel Racing | Ferrari 296 GT3 | Ferrari F163 3.0 L Twin Turbo V6 | 8 | (Italy) Marco Frezza | PA 1 P 1 | 1, 4 |
| (Switzerland) / Kessel Racing; (Switzerland) / Boem by Kessel Racing | Ferrari 296 GT3 | Ferrari F163 3.0 L Twin Turbo V6 | 8 | (Italy) David Fumanelli | PA 1 P 1 | 1, 4 |
| (Switzerland) / Kessel Racing; (Switzerland) / Boem by Kessel Racing | Ferrari 296 GT3 | Ferrari F163 3.0 L Twin Turbo V6 | 8 | (Italy) Marco Talarico | PA 1 P 1 | 1 |
| (Netherlands) Red Camel by Juta Racing (Note: Car No. 9 entered as Red Camel by Juta Racing and car no. 71 entered as Juta Racing.); (Lithuania) Juta Racing | Audi R8 LMS Evo II | Audi 5.2 L V10 | 9 | (Netherlands) Ivo Breukers | PA | 5 |
| (Netherlands) Red Camel by Juta Racing; (Lithuania) Juta Racing | Audi R8 LMS Evo II | Audi 5.2 L V10 | 9 | (Netherlands) Luc Breukers | PA | 5 |
| (Netherlands) Red Camel by Juta Racing; (Lithuania) Juta Racing | Audi R8 LMS Evo II | Audi 5.2 L V10 | 9 | (Netherlands) Rik Breukers | PA | 5 |
| (Netherlands) Red Camel by Juta Racing; (Lithuania) Juta Racing | Audi R8 LMS Evo II | Audi 5.2 L V10 | 9 | (Switzerland) Fabian Danz | PA | 5 |
| (Netherlands) Red Camel by Juta Racing; (Lithuania) Juta Racing | Audi R8 LMS Evo II | Audi 5.2 L V10 | 71 | (Lithuania) Arunas Geciauskas | PA 3 Am 1 | 1–2, 4–5 |
| (Netherlands) Red Camel by Juta Racing; (Lithuania) Juta Racing | Audi R8 LMS Evo II | Audi 5.2 L V10 | 71 | (Sweden) Lukas Sundahl | PA 3 Am 1 | 1–2 |
| (Netherlands) Red Camel by Juta Racing; (Lithuania) Juta Racing | Audi R8 LMS Evo II | Audi 5.2 L V10 | 71 | (Australia) John Corbett | PA 3 Am 1 | 1 |
| (Netherlands) Red Camel by Juta Racing; (Lithuania) Juta Racing | Audi R8 LMS Evo II | Audi 5.2 L V10 | 71 | (United Kingdom) Casper Stevenson | PA 3 Am 1 | 1 |
| (Netherlands) Red Camel by Juta Racing; (Lithuania) Juta Racing | Audi R8 LMS Evo II | Audi 5.2 L V10 | 71 | (United Kingdom) Lars Viljoen | PA 3 Am 1 | 2 |
| (Netherlands) Red Camel by Juta Racing; (Lithuania) Juta Racing | Audi R8 LMS Evo II | Audi 5.2 L V10 | 71 | (Lithuania) Leonardas Dirzys | PA 3 Am 1 | 4 |
| (Netherlands) Red Camel by Juta Racing; (Lithuania) Juta Racing | Audi R8 LMS Evo II | Audi 5.2 L V10 | 71 | (Lithuania) Justas Jonusis | PA 3 Am 1 | 4 |
| (Netherlands) Red Camel by Juta Racing; (Lithuania) Juta Racing | Audi R8 LMS Evo II | Audi 5.2 L V10 | 71 | (Lithuania) Simas Juodvirsis | PA 3 Am 1 | 4 |
| (Netherlands) Red Camel by Juta Racing; (Lithuania) Juta Racing | Audi R8 LMS Evo II | Audi 5.2 L V10 | 71 | (Lithuania) Sigitas Ambrazevicius | PA 3 Am 1 | 5 |
| (Netherlands) Red Camel by Juta Racing; (Lithuania) Juta Racing | Audi R8 LMS Evo II | Audi 5.2 L V10 | 71 | (New Zealand) Francois Beziac | PA 3 Am 1 | 5 |
| (Netherlands) Red Camel by Juta Racing; (Lithuania) Juta Racing | Audi R8 LMS Evo II | Audi 5.2 L V10 | 71 | (Lithuania) Eimantas Navikauskas | PA 3 Am 1 | 5 |
| (Netherlands) Red Camel by Juta Racing; (Lithuania) Juta Racing | Audi R8 LMS Evo II | Audi 5.2 L V10 | 71 | (Slovakia) Martin Ryba | PA 3 Am 1 | 5 |
| (Australia) Grove Racing | Mercedes-AMG GT3 Evo | Mercedes-AMG M159 6.2 L V8 | 10 | (Australia) Brenton Grove | P | 3 |
| (Australia) Grove Racing | Mercedes-AMG GT3 Evo | Mercedes-AMG M159 6.2 L V8 | 10 | (Australia) Stephen Grove | P | 3 |
| (Australia) Grove Racing | Mercedes-AMG GT3 Evo | Mercedes-AMG M159 6.2 L V8 | 10 | (New Zealand) Matthew Payne | P | 3 |
| (Australia) Grove Racing | Mercedes-AMG GT3 Evo | Mercedes-AMG M159 6.2 L V8 | 10 | (Australia) Garth Tander | P | 3 |
| (Switzerland) Hofor Racing | Mercedes-AMG GT3 | Mercedes-AMG M159 6.2 L V8 | 11 | (Germany) Kenneth Heyer | Am | All |
| (Switzerland) Hofor Racing | Mercedes-AMG GT3 | Mercedes-AMG M159 6.2 L V8 | 11 | (Switzerland) Michael Kroll | Am | All |
| (Switzerland) Hofor Racing | Mercedes-AMG GT3 | Mercedes-AMG M159 6.2 L V8 | 11 | (Germany) Max Partl | Am | All |
| (Switzerland) Hofor Racing | Mercedes-AMG GT3 | Mercedes-AMG M159 6.2 L V8 | 11 | (Germany) Alexander Prinz | Am | All |
| (Switzerland) Hofor Racing | Mercedes-AMG GT3 | Mercedes-AMG M159 6.2 L V8 | 11 | (Switzerland) Chantal Prinz | Am | All |
| (Germany) Car Collection Motorsport | Porsche 911 GT3 R (992) | Porsche M97/80 4.2 L Flat-6 | 12 | (United States) "Hash" | PA | 1–2 |
| (Germany) Car Collection Motorsport | Porsche 911 GT3 R (992) | Porsche M97/80 4.2 L Flat-6 | 12 | (Switzerland) Alex Fontana | PA | 1–2 |
| (Germany) Car Collection Motorsport | Porsche 911 GT3 R (992) | Porsche M97/80 4.2 L Flat-6 | 12 | (Switzerland) Ivan Jacoma | PA | 1–2 |
| (Germany) Car Collection Motorsport | Porsche 911 GT3 R (992) | Porsche M97/80 4.2 L Flat-6 | 12 | (Germany) Yannick Mettler | PA | 1–2 |
| (Germany) Car Collection Motorsport | Porsche 911 GT3 R (992) | Porsche M97/80 4.2 L Flat-6 | 80 | (Hong Kong) Antares Au | Am | 2 |
| (Germany) Car Collection Motorsport | Porsche 911 GT3 R (992) | Porsche M97/80 4.2 L Flat-6 | 80 | (Hong Kong) Jonathan Hui | Am | 2 |
| (Germany) Car Collection Motorsport | Porsche 911 GT3 R (992) | Porsche M97/80 4.2 L Flat-6 | 80 | (Macau) Kevin Tse | Am | 2 |
| (Denmark) Poulsen Motorsport | BMW M4 GT3 | BMW S58B30T0 3.0 L Turbo I6 | 14 | (Denmark) Kristian Poulsen | Am 1 PA 1 | 1, 5 |
| (Denmark) Poulsen Motorsport | BMW M4 GT3 | BMW S58B30T0 3.0 L Turbo I6 | 14 | (Denmark) Roland Poulsen | Am 1 PA 1 | 1, 5 |
| (Denmark) Poulsen Motorsport | BMW M4 GT3 | BMW S58B30T0 3.0 L Turbo I6 | 14 | (Denmark) Christoffer Nygaard | Am 1 PA 1 | 1 |
| (Denmark) Poulsen Motorsport | BMW M4 GT3 | BMW S58B30T0 3.0 L Turbo I6 | 14 | (Germany) Jens Klingmann | Am 1 PA 1 | 5 |
| (Denmark) Poulsen Motorsport | BMW M4 GT3 | BMW S58B30T0 3.0 L Turbo I6 | 14 | (Sweden) Alfred Nilsson | Am 1 PA 1 | 5 |
| (France) Saintéloc Junior Team | Audi R8 LMS Evo II | Audi 5.2 L V10 | 18 | (Austria) Michael Doppelmayr | PA | 2–5 |
| (France) Saintéloc Junior Team | Audi R8 LMS Evo II | Audi 5.2 L V10 | 18 | (Germany) Elia Erhart | PA | 2–5 |
| (France) Saintéloc Junior Team | Audi R8 LMS Evo II | Audi 5.2 L V10 | 18 | (Germany) Pierre Kaffer | PA | 2–5 |
| (France) Saintéloc Junior Team | Audi R8 LMS Evo II | Audi 5.2 L V10 | 18 | (Switzerland) Ernst Inderbitzin | PA | 2–3 |
| (France) Saintéloc Junior Team | Audi R8 LMS Evo II | Audi 5.2 L V10 | 18 | (France) Philippe Chatelet | PA | 3 |
| (France) Saintéloc Junior Team | Audi R8 LMS Evo II | Audi 5.2 L V10 | 18 | (Germany) Swen Herberger | PA | 4 |
| (France) Saintéloc Junior Team | Audi R8 LMS Evo II | Audi 5.2 L V10 | 18 | (Germany) Christer Jöns | PA | 5 |
| (France) Saintéloc Junior Team | Audi R8 LMS Evo II | Audi 5.2 L V10 | 18 | (France) Stephane Tribaudini | PA | 5 |
| (United States) Heart of Racing by SPS | Mercedes-AMG GT3 Evo | Mercedes-AMG M159 6.2 L V8 | 27 | (Canada) Roman De Angelis | Am | 1 |
| (United States) Heart of Racing by SPS | Mercedes-AMG GT3 Evo | Mercedes-AMG M159 6.2 L V8 | 27 | (United Kingdom) Ian James | Am | 1 |
| (United States) Heart of Racing by SPS | Mercedes-AMG GT3 Evo | Mercedes-AMG M159 6.2 L V8 | 27 | (United States) Gray Newell | Am | 1 |
| (Italy) Pellin Racing | Ferrari 488 GT3 Evo 2020 | Ferrari F154CB 3.9 L Turbo V8 | 29 | (United States) Lisa Clark | P | 1 |
| (Italy) Pellin Racing | Ferrari 488 GT3 Evo 2020 | Ferrari F154CB 3.9 L Turbo V8 | 29 | (Canada) Kyle Marcelli | P | 1 |
| (Italy) Pellin Racing | Ferrari 488 GT3 Evo 2020 | Ferrari F154CB 3.9 L Turbo V8 | 29 | (United States) Jeff Westphal | P | 1 |
| (Netherlands) GP Elite | Porsche 911 GT3 R (992) | Porsche M97/80 4.2 L Flat-6 | 32 | (Netherlands) Lucas Groeneveld | P | 1 |
| (Netherlands) GP Elite | Porsche 911 GT3 R (992) | Porsche M97/80 4.2 L Flat-6 | 32 | (Netherlands) Daan van Kuijk | P | 1 |
| (Netherlands) GP Elite | Porsche 911 GT3 R (992) | Porsche M97/80 4.2 L Flat-6 | 32 | (Netherlands) Jan van Kuijk | P | 1 |
| (Netherlands) GP Elite | Porsche 911 GT3 R (992) | Porsche M97/80 4.2 L Flat-6 | 32 | (Netherlands) Max van Splunteren | P | 1 |
| (Germany) Land Motorsport | Audi R8 LMS Evo II | Audi 5.2 L V10 | 34 | (Germany) Dr. Johannes Kirchhof | Am | 2, 4–5 |
| (Germany) Land Motorsport | Audi R8 LMS Evo II | Audi 5.2 L V10 | 34 | (Norway) Wiggo Dalmo | Am | 2, 5 |
| (Germany) Land Motorsport | Audi R8 LMS Evo II | Audi 5.2 L V10 | 34 | (Germany) Tim Vogler | Am | 2, 5 |
| (Germany) Land Motorsport | Audi R8 LMS Evo II | Audi 5.2 L V10 | 34 | (Germany) Max Edelhoff | Am | 2 |
| (Germany) Land Motorsport | Audi R8 LMS Evo II | Audi 5.2 L V10 | 34 | (Germany) Elmar Grimm | Am | 4–5 |
| (Germany) Land Motorsport | Audi R8 LMS Evo II | Audi 5.2 L V10 | 34 | (Germany) Stefan Wieninger | Am | 4 |
| (Germany) Land Motorsport | Audi R8 LMS Evo II | Audi 5.2 L V10 | 34 | (Germany) Ingo Vogler | Am | 5 |
| (New Zealand) Prime Speed Sport | Aston Martin Vantage AMR GT3 Evo | Aston Martin M177 4.0 L Twin-Turbo V8 | 42 | (New Zealand) Earl Bamber | PA | 4 |
| (New Zealand) Prime Speed Sport | Aston Martin Vantage AMR GT3 Evo | Aston Martin M177 4.0 L Twin-Turbo V8 | 42 | (New Zealand) Heremana Malmezac | PA | 4 |
| (New Zealand) Prime Speed Sport | Aston Martin Vantage AMR GT3 Evo | Aston Martin M177 4.0 L Twin-Turbo V8 | 42 | (Australia) Liam Talbot | PA | 4 |
| (Slovakia) ARC Bratislava | Lamborghini Huracán GT3 Evo | Lamborghini DGF 5.2 L V10 | 44 | (Slovakia) Miro Konôpka | Am | 2, 5 |
| (Slovakia) ARC Bratislava | Lamborghini Huracán GT3 Evo | Lamborghini DGF 5.2 L V10 | 44 | (Slovakia) Zdeno Mikulasko | Am | 2, 5 |
| (Slovakia) ARC Bratislava | Lamborghini Huracán GT3 Evo | Lamborghini DGF 5.2 L V10 | 44 | (Slovakia) Anton Kiaba | Am | 2 |
| (Slovakia) ARC Bratislava | Lamborghini Huracán GT3 Evo | Lamborghini DGF 5.2 L V10 | 44 | (Guatemala) Mateo Llarena | Am | 2 |
| (Slovakia) ARC Bratislava | Lamborghini Huracán GT3 Evo | Lamborghini DGF 5.2 L V10 | 44 | (Czech Republic) Petr Brecka | Am | 5 |
| (Slovakia) ARC Bratislava | Lamborghini Huracán GT3 Evo | Lamborghini DGF 5.2 L V10 | 44 | (Slovakia) Adam Konôpka | Am | 5 |
| (Slovakia) ARC Bratislava | Lamborghini Huracán GT3 Evo | Lamborghini DGF 5.2 L V10 | 44 | (Poland) Andrzej Lewandowski | Am | 5 |
| (Italy) MP Racing | Mercedes-AMG GT3 Evo | Mercedes-AMG M159 6.2 L V8 | 58 | (Italy) Corinna Gostner | Am | 1–2 |
| (Italy) MP Racing | Mercedes-AMG GT3 Evo | Mercedes-AMG M159 6.2 L V8 | 58 | (Italy) David Gostner | Am | 1–2 |
| (Italy) MP Racing | Mercedes-AMG GT3 Evo | Mercedes-AMG M159 6.2 L V8 | 58 | (Italy) Manuela Gostner | Am | 1–2 |
| (Italy) MP Racing | Mercedes-AMG GT3 Evo | Mercedes-AMG M159 6.2 L V8 | 58 | (Italy) Thomas Gostner | Am | 1–2 |
| (Lithuania) RD Signs – Siauliai racing team | Lamborghini Huracán GT3 Evo | Lamborghini DGF 5.2 L V10 | 69 | (Lithuania) Audrius Butkevicius | PA 2 Am 2 | 1–2, 4–5 |
| (Lithuania) RD Signs – Siauliai racing team | Lamborghini Huracán GT3 Evo | Lamborghini DGF 5.2 L V10 | 69 | (Italy) Nicola Michelon | PA 2 Am 2 | 1–2, 4–5 |
| (Lithuania) RD Signs – Siauliai racing team | Lamborghini Huracán GT3 Evo | Lamborghini DGF 5.2 L V10 | 69 | (Lithuania) Paulius Paskevicius | PA 2 Am 2 | 1–2, 4–5 |
| (Lithuania) RD Signs – Siauliai racing team | Lamborghini Huracán GT3 Evo | Lamborghini DGF 5.2 L V10 | 69 | (Switzerland) Tim Müller | PA 2 Am 2 | 4 |
| (Lithuania) RD Signs – Siauliai racing team | Lamborghini Huracán GT3 Evo | Lamborghini DGF 5.2 L V10 | 69 | (Lithuania) Ramunas Capkauskas | PA 2 Am 2 | 5 |
| (Lithuania) RD Signs – Siauliai racing team | Lamborghini Huracán GT3 Evo | Lamborghini DGF 5.2 L V10 | 69 | (Lithuania) Paulius Ruskys | PA 2 Am 2 | 5 |
| (Poland) PTT by Schnitzelalm Racing | Mercedes-AMG GT3 Evo | Mercedes-AMG M159 6.2 L V8 | 74 | (Germany) Jay Mo Härtling | Am | 4 |
| (Poland) PTT by Schnitzelalm Racing | Mercedes-AMG GT3 Evo | Mercedes-AMG M159 6.2 L V8 | 74 | (Poland) Martin Kaczmarski | Am | 4 |
| (Poland) PTT by Schnitzelalm Racing | Mercedes-AMG GT3 Evo | Mercedes-AMG M159 6.2 L V8 | 74 | (Poland) Mateusz Lisowski | Am | 4 |
| (New Zealand) EBM | Porsche 911 GT3 R (992) | Porsche M97/80 4.2 L Flat-6 | 84 | (Malaysia) Adrian D'Silva | PA | 2 |
| (New Zealand) EBM | Porsche 911 GT3 R (992) | Porsche M97/80 4.2 L Flat-6 | 84 | (Australia) Shae Davies | PA | 2 |
| (New Zealand) EBM | Porsche 911 GT3 R (992) | Porsche M97/80 4.2 L Flat-6 | 84 | (Estonia) Martin Rump | PA | 2 |
| (United States) CP Racing | Mercedes-AMG GT3 Evo | Mercedes-AMG M159 6.2 L V8 | 85 | (United States) Charles Espenlaub | Am | 1–2 |
| (United States) CP Racing | Mercedes-AMG GT3 Evo | Mercedes-AMG M159 6.2 L V8 | 85 | (United States) Joe Foster | Am | 1–2 |
| (United States) CP Racing | Mercedes-AMG GT3 Evo | Mercedes-AMG M159 6.2 L V8 | 85 | (United States) Shane Lewis | Am | 1–2 |
| (United States) CP Racing | Mercedes-AMG GT3 Evo | Mercedes-AMG M159 6.2 L V8 | 85 | (United States) Charles Putman | Am | 1–2 |
| (Spain) E2P Racing | Porsche 911 GT3 R (991.2) | Porsche 4.0 L Flat-6 | 90 | (Spain) Pablo Burguera | PA | All |
| (Spain) E2P Racing | Porsche 911 GT3 R (991.2) | Porsche 4.0 L Flat-6 | 90 | (Portugal) Álvaro Parente | PA | All |
| (Spain) E2P Racing | Porsche 911 GT3 R (991.2) | Porsche 4.0 L Flat-6 | 90 | (Spain) Antonio Sainero | PA | All |
| (Spain) E2P Racing | Porsche 911 GT3 R (991.2) | Porsche 4.0 L Flat-6 | 90 | (Spain) Javier Morcillo | PA | 5 |
| (Germany) Herberth Motorsport | Porsche 911 GT3 R (992) | Porsche M97/80 4.2 L Flat-6 | 91 | (Germany) Ralf Bohn | Am | All |
| (Germany) Herberth Motorsport | Porsche 911 GT3 R (992) | Porsche M97/80 4.2 L Flat-6 | 91 | (United States) Jason Hart | Am | All |
| (Germany) Herberth Motorsport | Porsche 911 GT3 R (992) | Porsche M97/80 4.2 L Flat-6 | 91 | (United States) Scott Noble | Am | All |
| (Germany) Herberth Motorsport | Porsche 911 GT3 R (992) | Porsche M97/80 4.2 L Flat-6 | 91 | (United Kingdom) Ian Loggie | Am | 3 |
| (Germany) Herberth Motorsport | Porsche 911 GT3 R (992) | Porsche M97/80 4.2 L Flat-6 | 91 | (United States) Dustin Blattner | Am | 5 |
| (Germany) Herberth Motorsport | Porsche 911 GT3 R (992) | Porsche M97/80 4.2 L Flat-6 | 92 | (Germany) Ralf Bohn | PA | 3 |
| (Germany) Herberth Motorsport | Porsche 911 GT3 R (992) | Porsche M97/80 4.2 L Flat-6 | 92 | (Germany) Vincent Kolb | PA | 3 |
| (Germany) Herberth Motorsport | Porsche 911 GT3 R (992) | Porsche M97/80 4.2 L Flat-6 | 92 | (Germany) Max Moritz | PA | 3 |
| (Germany) Herberth Motorsport | Porsche 911 GT3 R (992) | Porsche M97/80 4.2 L Flat-6 | 92 | (Austria) Felix Neuhofer | PA | 3 |
| (Germany) Herberth Motorsport | Porsche 911 GT3 R (992) | Porsche M97/80 4.2 L Flat-6 | 92 | (Germany) Robert Renauer | PA | 3 |
GTX
| (France) Vortex V8 | Vortex 1.0 1 Vortex 2.0 2 | Chevrolet 6.2 L V8 | 701 | (France) Lionel Amrouche | | All |
| (France) Vortex V8 | Vortex 1.0 1 Vortex 2.0 2 | Chevrolet 6.2 L V8 | 701 | (France) Philippe Bonnel | | All |
| (France) Vortex V8 | Vortex 1.0 1 Vortex 2.0 2 | Chevrolet 6.2 L V8 | 701 | (France) Gilles Courtois | | All |
| (France) Vortex V8 | Vortex 1.0 1 Vortex 2.0 2 | Chevrolet 6.2 L V8 | 701 | (France) Lucas Sugliano | | 1, 3 |
| (France) Vortex V8 | Vortex 1.0 1 Vortex 2.0 2 | Chevrolet 6.2 L V8 | 701 | (France) Solenn Amrouche | | 5 |
| (France) Vortex V8 | Vortex 2.0 | Chevrolet 6.2 L V8 | 702 | (France) Arnaud Gomez | | 2 |
| (France) Vortex V8 | Vortex 2.0 | Chevrolet 6.2 L V8 | 702 | (France) Olivier Gomez | | 2 |
| (France) Vortex V8 | Vortex 2.0 | Chevrolet 6.2 L V8 | 702 | (France) Lucas Sugliano | | 2, 5 |
| (France) Vortex V8 | Vortex 2.0 | Chevrolet 6.2 L V8 | 702 | (France) Cyril Calmon | | 5 |
| (France) Vortex V8 | Vortex 2.0 | Chevrolet 6.2 L V8 | 702 | (France) Pierre Fontaine | | 5 |
| (France) Vortex V8 | Vortex 2.0 | Chevrolet 6.2 L V8 | 702 | (France) Miguel Moiola | | 5 |
| (Austria) Razoon – More than Racing | KTM X-Bow GT2 | Audi 2.5 L I5 | 714 | (Denmark) Simon Birch | | 5 |
| (Austria) Razoon – More than Racing | KTM X-Bow GT2 | Audi 2.5 L I5 | 714 | (Poland) Arthur Chwist | | 5 |
| (Austria) Razoon – More than Racing | KTM X-Bow GT2 | Audi 2.5 L I5 | 714 | (Austria) Daniel Drexel | | 5 |
| (Austria) Razoon – More than Racing | KTM X-Bow GT2 | Audi 2.5 L I5 | 714 | (Austria) Christian Loimayr | | 5 |
| (Germany) 9und11 Racing | Porsche 991 GT3 Cup II MR | Porsche 4.0 L Flat-6 | 719 | (Germany) Georg Goder | | 1–2 |
| (Germany) 9und11 Racing | Porsche 991 GT3 Cup II MR | Porsche 4.0 L Flat-6 | 719 | (Germany) Tim Scheerbarth | | 1–2 |
| (Germany) 9und11 Racing | Porsche 991 GT3 Cup II MR | Porsche 4.0 L Flat-6 | 719 | (Germany) Martin Schlüter | | 1–2 |
| (Germany) 9und11 Racing | Porsche 991 GT3 Cup II MR | Porsche 4.0 L Flat-6 | 719 | (Germany) Ralf Oehme | | 1 |
| (France) Team CMR | Ginetta G56 Cup | GM LS3 6.2 L V8 | 795 | (United Kingdom) Mike Simpson | | 2 |
| (France) Team CMR | Ginetta G56 Cup | GM LS3 6.2 L V8 | 795 | (United Kingdom) Freddie Tomlinson | | 2 |
| (France) Team CMR | Ginetta G56 Cup | GM LS3 6.2 L V8 | 795 | (United Kingdom) Lawrence Tomlinson | | 2 |
992
| (Denmark) Holmgaard Motorsport | Porsche 992 GT3 Cup | Porsche 4.0 L Flat-6 | 902 | (Denmark) Jonas Holmgaard | P | 2–3, 5 |
| (Denmark) Holmgaard Motorsport | Porsche 992 GT3 Cup | Porsche 4.0 L Flat-6 | 902 | (Denmark) Magnus Holmgaard | P | 2–3, 5 |
| (Denmark) Holmgaard Motorsport | Porsche 992 GT3 Cup | Porsche 4.0 L Flat-6 | 902 | (France) Stéphane Perrin | P | 2–3, 5 |
| (Denmark) Holmgaard Motorsport | Porsche 992 GT3 Cup | Porsche 4.0 L Flat-6 | 902 | (Denmark) Martin Vedel Mortensen | P | 2–3, 5 |
| (Denmark) Holmgaard Motorsport | Porsche 992 GT3 Cup | Porsche 4.0 L Flat-6 | 902 | (Germany) Marlon Menden | P | 2 |
| (Denmark) Holmgaard Motorsport | Porsche 992 GT3 Cup | Porsche 4.0 L Flat-6 | 902 | (Canada) Michel Sallenbach | P | 5 |
| (Belgium) Red Ant Racing | Porsche 992 GT3 Cup | Porsche 4.0 L Flat-6 | 903 | (Belgium) Ayrton Redant | P | All |
| (Belgium) Red Ant Racing | Porsche 992 GT3 Cup | Porsche 4.0 L Flat-6 | 903 | (Belgium) Yannick Redant | P | All |
| (Belgium) Red Ant Racing | Porsche 992 GT3 Cup | Porsche 4.0 L Flat-6 | 903 | (Belgium) Kobe de Breucker | P | 1, 3–5 |
| (Belgium) Red Ant Racing | Porsche 992 GT3 Cup | Porsche 4.0 L Flat-6 | 903 | (Lithuania) Julius Adomavičius | P | 2 |
| (Belgium) Red Ant Racing | Porsche 992 GT3 Cup | Porsche 4.0 L Flat-6 | 903 | (Netherlands) Lucas Van Eijndhoven | P | 3 |
| (Belgium) Red Ant Racing | Porsche 992 GT3 Cup | Porsche 4.0 L Flat-6 | 903 | (Belgium) Lars Zaenen | P | 5 |
| (Belgium) Red Ant Racing | Porsche 992 GT3 Cup | Porsche 4.0 L Flat-6 | 904 | (Belgium) Peter Guelinckx | P | All |
| (Belgium) Red Ant Racing | Porsche 992 GT3 Cup | Porsche 4.0 L Flat-6 | 904 | (Belgium) Brent Verheyen | P | All |
| (Belgium) Red Ant Racing | Porsche 992 GT3 Cup | Porsche 4.0 L Flat-6 | 904 | (Belgium) Michiel Haverans | P | 1–4 |
| (Belgium) Red Ant Racing | Porsche 992 GT3 Cup | Porsche 4.0 L Flat-6 | 904 | (Belgium) Kris Cools | P | 3 |
| (Belgium) Red Ant Racing | Porsche 992 GT3 Cup | Porsche 4.0 L Flat-6 | 904 | (Belgium) Jef Machiels | P | 5 |
| (Belgium) Red Ant Racing | Porsche 992 GT3 Cup | Porsche 4.0 L Flat-6 | 904 | (United Kingdom) Gavin Pickering | P | 5 |
| (Germany) RPM Racing | Porsche 992 GT3 Cup | Porsche 4.0 L Flat-6 | 907 | (Germany) Philip Hamprecht | Am | All |
| (Germany) RPM Racing | Porsche 992 GT3 Cup | Porsche 4.0 L Flat-6 | 907 | (Sweden) Niclas Jönsson | Am | All |
| (Germany) RPM Racing | Porsche 992 GT3 Cup | Porsche 4.0 L Flat-6 | 907 | (United States) Tracy Krohn | Am | All |
| (Germany) RPM Racing | Porsche 992 GT3 Cup | Porsche 4.0 L Flat-6 | 907 | (Netherlands) Patrick Huisman | Am | 3, 5 |
| (France) SebLajoux Racing by DUWO Racing | Porsche 992 GT3 Cup | Porsche 4.0 L Flat-6 | 908 | (France) Gilles Blasco | Am | 1–2, 4 |
| (France) SebLajoux Racing by DUWO Racing | Porsche 992 GT3 Cup | Porsche 4.0 L Flat-6 | 908 | (France) Jean-François Demorge | Am | 1–2, 4 |
| (France) SebLajoux Racing by DUWO Racing | Porsche 992 GT3 Cup | Porsche 4.0 L Flat-6 | 908 | (France) Philippe Polette | Am | 1–2, 4 |
| (France) SebLajoux Racing by DUWO Racing | Porsche 992 GT3 Cup | Porsche 4.0 L Flat-6 | 908 | (France) Stéphane Perrin | Am | 1 |
| (France) SebLajoux Racing by DUWO Racing | Porsche 992 GT3 Cup | Porsche 4.0 L Flat-6 | 908 | (France) Benjamin Roy | Am | 2 |
| (France) SebLajoux Racing by DUWO Racing | Porsche 992 GT3 Cup | Porsche 4.0 L Flat-6 | 908 | (France) Solenn Amrouche | Am | 3 |
| (France) SebLajoux Racing by DUWO Racing | Porsche 992 GT3 Cup | Porsche 4.0 L Flat-6 | 908 | (France) Miguel Moiola | Am | 3 |
| (France) SebLajoux Racing by DUWO Racing | Porsche 992 GT3 Cup | Porsche 4.0 L Flat-6 | 908 | (France) Eric Mouez | Am | 3 |
| (France) SebLajoux Racing by DUWO Racing | Porsche 992 GT3 Cup | Porsche 4.0 L Flat-6 | 908 | (France) Lauris Nauroy | Am | 3 |
| (France) SebLajoux Racing by DUWO Racing | Porsche 992 GT3 Cup | Porsche 4.0 L Flat-6 | 908 | (Belgium) Gary Terclavers | Am | 3 |
| (France) SebLajoux Racing by DUWO Racing | Porsche 992 GT3 Cup | Porsche 4.0 L Flat-6 | 908 | (France) Benjamin Roy | Am | 4 |
| (Netherlands) Red Camel-Jordans.nl | Porsche 992 GT3 Cup | Porsche 4.0 L Flat-6 | 909 | (Netherlands) Luc Breukers | P | 1–4 |
| (Netherlands) Red Camel-Jordans.nl | Porsche 992 GT3 Cup | Porsche 4.0 L Flat-6 | 909 | (Netherlands) Ivo Breukers | P | 1–4 |
| (Netherlands) Red Camel-Jordans.nl | Porsche 992 GT3 Cup | Porsche 4.0 L Flat-6 | 909 | (Switzerland) Fabian Danz | P | 1–4 |
| (Netherlands) Red Camel-Jordans.nl | Porsche 992 GT3 Cup | Porsche 4.0 L Flat-6 | 909 | (Netherlands) Rik Breukers | P | 2–4 |
| (South Korea) Hankook Competition | Porsche 992 GT3 Cup | Porsche 4.0 L Flat-6 | 911 | (Hong Kong) Dr. Ma | Am | 1–2 |
| (South Korea) Hankook Competition | Porsche 992 GT3 Cup | Porsche 4.0 L Flat-6 | 911 | (South Korea) Roelof Bruins | Am | 1–2 |
| (South Korea) Hankook Competition | Porsche 992 GT3 Cup | Porsche 4.0 L Flat-6 | 911 | (Canada) Steven Cho | Am | 1–2 |
| (South Korea) Hankook Competition | Porsche 992 GT3 Cup | Porsche 4.0 L Flat-6 | 911 | (South Korea) Jongkyum Kim | Am | 1 |
| (Switzerland) Centri Porsche Ticino | Porsche 992 GT3 Cup | Porsche 4.0 L Flat-6 | 912 | (Italy) Max Busnelli | Am | 1 |
| (Switzerland) Centri Porsche Ticino | Porsche 992 GT3 Cup | Porsche 4.0 L Flat-6 | 912 | (Italy) Francesco Fenici | Am | 1 |
| (Switzerland) Centri Porsche Ticino | Porsche 992 GT3 Cup | Porsche 4.0 L Flat-6 | 912 | (Switzerland) Ivan Jacoma | Am | 1 |
| (Switzerland) Centri Porsche Ticino | Porsche 992 GT3 Cup | Porsche 4.0 L Flat-6 | 912 | (Switzerland) Valerio Presezzi | Am | 1 |
| (Switzerland) Orchid Racing Team | Porsche 992 GT3 Cup | Porsche 4.0 L Flat-6 | 917 | (Switzerland) Alexandre Mottet | Am | All |
| (Switzerland) Orchid Racing Team | Porsche 992 GT3 Cup | Porsche 4.0 L Flat-6 | 917 | (Switzerland) Daniel Gillioz | Am | 1–3 |
| (Switzerland) Orchid Racing Team | Porsche 992 GT3 Cup | Porsche 4.0 L Flat-6 | 917 | (Switzerland) Antonio Garzon | Am | 1, 3–5 |
| (Switzerland) Orchid Racing Team | Porsche 992 GT3 Cup | Porsche 4.0 L Flat-6 | 917 | (France) Laurène Godey | Am | 1 |
| (Switzerland) Orchid Racing Team | Porsche 992 GT3 Cup | Porsche 4.0 L Flat-6 | 917 | (France) Frank Villiger | Am | 1 |
| (Switzerland) Orchid Racing Team | Porsche 992 GT3 Cup | Porsche 4.0 L Flat-6 | 917 | (France) Laurent Misbach | Am | 2, 4–5 |
| (Switzerland) Orchid Racing Team | Porsche 992 GT3 Cup | Porsche 4.0 L Flat-6 | 917 | (Switzerland) Jeremy Brodard | Am | 3–5 |
| (Switzerland) Orchid Racing Team | Porsche 992 GT3 Cup | Porsche 4.0 L Flat-6 | 917 | (France) Antoine Leclerc | Am | 5 |
| (Switzerland) Orchid Racing Team | Porsche 992 GT3 Cup | Porsche 4.0 L Flat-6 | 963 | (France) Laurent Misbach | P | 1, 3 |
| (Switzerland) Orchid Racing Team | Porsche 992 GT3 Cup | Porsche 4.0 L Flat-6 | 963 | (Switzerland) Loïc Villiger | P | 1, 3 |
| (Switzerland) Orchid Racing Team | Porsche 992 GT3 Cup | Porsche 4.0 L Flat-6 | 963 | (France) Romain Dumas | P | 1 |
| (Switzerland) Orchid Racing Team | Porsche 992 GT3 Cup | Porsche 4.0 L Flat-6 | 963 | (France) Sébastien Loeb | P | 1 |
| (Switzerland) Orchid Racing Team | Porsche 992 GT3 Cup | Porsche 4.0 L Flat-6 | 963 | (Switzerland) Alexandre Mottet | P | 1 |
| (Switzerland) Orchid Racing Team | Porsche 992 GT3 Cup | Porsche 4.0 L Flat-6 | 963 | (France) Antoine Leclerc | P | 3 |
| (Switzerland) Orchid Racing Team | Porsche 992 GT3 Cup | Porsche 4.0 L Flat-6 | 963 | (France) Frank Villiger | P | 3 |
| (Belgium) Mühlner Motorsport | Porsche 992 GT3 Cup | Porsche 4.0 L Flat-6 | 918 | (Germany) Ben Bünnagel | Am | 5 |
| (Belgium) Mühlner Motorsport | Porsche 992 GT3 Cup | Porsche 4.0 L Flat-6 | 918 | (Estonia) Martin Rump | Am | 5 |
| (Belgium) Mühlner Motorsport | Porsche 992 GT3 Cup | Porsche 4.0 L Flat-6 | 918 | (United States) Bryan Sircely | Am | 5 |
| (Belgium) Mühlner Motorsport | Porsche 992 GT3 Cup | Porsche 4.0 L Flat-6 | 918 | (Slovakia) Antal Zsigo | Am | 5 |
| (Italy) Fulgenzi Racing | Porsche 992 GT3 Cup | Porsche 4.0 L Flat-6 | 922 | (Italy) Andrea Buratti | Am | 4 |
| (Italy) Fulgenzi Racing | Porsche 992 GT3 Cup | Porsche 4.0 L Flat-6 | 922 | (Italy) Corrado Costa | Am | 4 |
| (Italy) Fulgenzi Racing | Porsche 992 GT3 Cup | Porsche 4.0 L Flat-6 | 922 | (Italy) Enrico Fernando | Am | 4 |
| (Italy) Fulgenzi Racing | Porsche 992 GT3 Cup | Porsche 4.0 L Flat-6 | 922 | (United States) Eric Wagner | Am | 4 |
| (Netherlands) / Bas Koeten Racing (Note: Car No. 925 entered as Bas Koeten Racing, and Car No. 992 entered as NKPP Racing by Bas Koeten Racing.); (Netherlands) / NKPP Racing by Bas Koeten Racing | Porsche 992 GT3 Cup | Porsche 4.0 L Flat-6 | 925 | (Netherlands) Bob Herber | Am | 1–2 |
| (Netherlands) / Bas Koeten Racing; (Netherlands) / NKPP Racing by Bas Koeten Racing | Porsche 992 GT3 Cup | Porsche 4.0 L Flat-6 | 925 | (Netherlands) Marcel van Berlo | Am | 1–2 |
| (Netherlands) / Bas Koeten Racing; (Netherlands) / NKPP Racing by Bas Koeten Racing | Porsche 992 GT3 Cup | Porsche 4.0 L Flat-6 | 992 | (Netherlands) Gijs Bessem | Am | 1–2, 5 |
| (Netherlands) / Bas Koeten Racing; (Netherlands) / NKPP Racing by Bas Koeten Racing | Porsche 992 GT3 Cup | Porsche 4.0 L Flat-6 | 992 | (Netherlands) Harry Hilders | Am | 1–2, 5 |
| (Netherlands) / Bas Koeten Racing; (Netherlands) / NKPP Racing by Bas Koeten Racing | Porsche 992 GT3 Cup | Porsche 4.0 L Flat-6 | 992 | (Netherlands) Bob Herber | Am | 5 |
| (Netherlands) / Bas Koeten Racing; (Netherlands) / NKPP Racing by Bas Koeten Racing | Porsche 992 GT3 Cup | Porsche 4.0 L Flat-6 | 992 | (Netherlands) Mark van der Aa | Am | 5 |
| (Germany) SRS Team Sorg Rennsport | Porsche 992 GT3 Cup | Porsche 4.0 L Flat-6 | 927 | (Germany) Heiko Eichenberg | Am | 2 |
| (Germany) SRS Team Sorg Rennsport | Porsche 992 GT3 Cup | Porsche 4.0 L Flat-6 | 927 | (Switzerland) Patrik Grütter | Am | 2 |
| (Germany) SRS Team Sorg Rennsport | Porsche 992 GT3 Cup | Porsche 4.0 L Flat-6 | 927 | (Austria) Bernhard Wagner | Am | 2 |
| (Qatar) QMMF by HRT (Note: Car No. 931 entered as QMMF by HRT, and Car No. 967 entered as HRT Performance.); (Germany) HRT Performance | Porsche 992 GT3 Cup | Porsche 4.0 L Flat-6 | 931 | (Qatar) Ibrahim Al-Abdulghani | Am | 5 |
| (Qatar) QMMF by HRT; (Germany) HRT Performance | Porsche 992 GT3 Cup | Porsche 4.0 L Flat-6 | 931 | (Qatar) Abdulla Ali Al-Khelaifi | Am | 5 |
| (Qatar) QMMF by HRT; (Germany) HRT Performance | Porsche 992 GT3 Cup | Porsche 4.0 L Flat-6 | 931 | (Qatar) Ghanim Ali Al Maadheed | Am | 5 |
| (Qatar) QMMF by HRT; (Germany) HRT Performance | Porsche 992 GT3 Cup | Porsche 4.0 L Flat-6 | 931 | (Germany) Julian Hanses | Am | 5 |
| (Qatar) QMMF by HRT; (Germany) HRT Performance | Porsche 992 GT3 Cup | Porsche 4.0 L Flat-6 | 967 | (Switzerland) Linus Diener | Am 3 P 1 | 1–4 |
| (Qatar) QMMF by HRT; (Germany) HRT Performance | Porsche 992 GT3 Cup | Porsche 4.0 L Flat-6 | 967 | (Italy) Amadeo Pampanini | Am 3 P 1 | 1–4 |
| (Qatar) QMMF by HRT; (Germany) HRT Performance | Porsche 992 GT3 Cup | Porsche 4.0 L Flat-6 | 967 | (Switzerland) Nicolas Stürzinger | Am 3 P 1 | 1–4 |
| (Qatar) QMMF by HRT; (Germany) HRT Performance | Porsche 992 GT3 Cup | Porsche 4.0 L Flat-6 | 967 | (Germany) Kim André Hauschild | Am 3 P 1 | 2–3, 5 |
| (Qatar) QMMF by HRT; (Germany) HRT Performance | Porsche 992 GT3 Cup | Porsche 4.0 L Flat-6 | 967 | (Switzerland) Stefano Monaco | Am 3 P 1 | 3 |
| (Qatar) QMMF by HRT; (Germany) HRT Performance | Porsche 992 GT3 Cup | Porsche 4.0 L Flat-6 | 967 | (United Kingdom) Bradley Ellis | Am 3 P 1 | 5 |
| (Qatar) QMMF by HRT; (Germany) HRT Performance | Porsche 992 GT3 Cup | Porsche 4.0 L Flat-6 | 967 | (United Kingdom) David Holloway | Am 3 P 1 | 5 |
| (Qatar) QMMF by HRT; (Germany) HRT Performance | Porsche 992 GT3 Cup | Porsche 4.0 L Flat-6 | 967 | (Republic of Ireland) Jonathan Kearney | Am 3 P 1 | 5 |
| (Qatar) QMMF by HRT; (Germany) HRT Performance | Porsche 992 GT3 Cup | Porsche 4.0 L Flat-6 | 967 | (Belgium) Gary Terclavers | Am 3 P 1 | 5 |
| (Spain) Road to Le Mans | Porsche 992 GT3 Cup | Porsche 4.0 L Flat-6 | 949 | (Spain) Pablo Bras Silvero | Am | 5 |
| (Spain) Road to Le Mans | Porsche 992 GT3 Cup | Porsche 4.0 L Flat-6 | 949 | (Spain) Francesc Gutierrez Agüi | Am | 5 |
| (Spain) Road to Le Mans | Porsche 992 GT3 Cup | Porsche 4.0 L Flat-6 | 949 | (Spain) Fernando Gonzalez Gonzalez | Am | 5 |
| (Spain) Road to Le Mans | Porsche 992 GT3 Cup | Porsche 4.0 L Flat-6 | 949 | (Spain) Pedro Miguel Lourinho Bras | Am | 5 |
| (Spain) Road to Le Mans | Porsche 992 GT3 Cup | Porsche 4.0 L Flat-6 | 949 | (Spain) Agustin Sanabria Crespo | Am | 5 |
| (San Marino) GDL Racing | Porsche 992 GT3 Cup | Porsche 4.0 L Flat-6 | 969 | (United States) Dallas Carroll | Am | 2 |
| (San Marino) GDL Racing | Porsche 992 GT3 Cup | Porsche 4.0 L Flat-6 | 969 | (United States) Matt Kehoe | Am | 2 |
| (San Marino) GDL Racing | Porsche 992 GT3 Cup | Porsche 4.0 L Flat-6 | 969 | (United States) Mark Smith | Am | 2 |
| (Netherlands) Hans Weijs Motorsport | Porsche 992 GT3 Cup | Porsche 4.0 L Flat-6 | 972 | (Netherlands) Paul Meijer | Am | 2 |
| (Netherlands) Hans Weijs Motorsport | Porsche 992 GT3 Cup | Porsche 4.0 L Flat-6 | 972 | (Netherlands) Ralph Poppelaars | Am | 2 |
| (Netherlands) Hans Weijs Motorsport | Porsche 992 GT3 Cup | Porsche 4.0 L Flat-6 | 972 | (Netherlands) Edwin Schilt | Am | 2 |
| (Netherlands) Hans Weijs Motorsport | Porsche 992 GT3 Cup | Porsche 4.0 L Flat-6 | 972 | (Netherlands) Mark van Eldik | Am | 2 |
| (Italy) Ebimotors (Note: Car No. 973 entered as Ebimotors, and Car No. 974 entered as Rimo Adero by Ebimotors.); (Lithuania) Rimo Adero by Ebimotors | Porsche 992 GT3 Cup | Porsche 4.0 L Flat-6 | 973 | (Italy) Paolo Gnemmi | Am | 1 |
| (Italy) Ebimotors; (Lithuania) Rimo Adero by Ebimotors | Porsche 992 GT3 Cup | Porsche 4.0 L Flat-6 | 973 | (Italy) Gianluigi Piccioli | Am | 1 |
| (Italy) Ebimotors; (Lithuania) Rimo Adero by Ebimotors | Porsche 992 GT3 Cup | Porsche 4.0 L Flat-6 | 973 | (Italy) Paolo Venerosi | Am | 1 |
| (Italy) Ebimotors; (Lithuania) Rimo Adero by Ebimotors | Porsche 992 GT3 Cup | Porsche 4.0 L Flat-6 | 974 | (Lithuania) Marius Bartkus | Am | 1 |
| (Italy) Ebimotors; (Lithuania) Rimo Adero by Ebimotors | Porsche 992 GT3 Cup | Porsche 4.0 L Flat-6 | 974 | (Lithuania) Mantas Janavicius | Am | 1 |
| (Italy) Ebimotors; (Lithuania) Rimo Adero by Ebimotors | Porsche 992 GT3 Cup | Porsche 4.0 L Flat-6 | 974 | (Lithuania) Aurelijus Rusteika | Am | 1 |
| (Italy) Ebimotors; (Lithuania) Rimo Adero by Ebimotors | Porsche 992 GT3 Cup | Porsche 4.0 L Flat-6 | 974 | (Latvia) Valters Zviedris | Am | 1 |
| (Belgium) Speedlover | Porsche 992 GT3 Cup | Porsche 4.0 L Flat-6 | 979 | (Belgium) Olivier Dons | Am | 2 |
| (Belgium) Speedlover | Porsche 992 GT3 Cup | Porsche 4.0 L Flat-6 | 979 | (Belgium) Wim Meulders | Am | 2 |
| (Belgium) Speedlover | Porsche 992 GT3 Cup | Porsche 4.0 L Flat-6 | 979 | (Belgium) Rik Renmans | Am | 2 |
| (Austria) Neuhofer Rennsport | Porsche 992 GT3 Cup | Porsche 4.0 L Flat-6 | 985 | (Austria) Markus Neuhofer | Am | 1–2 |
| (Austria) Neuhofer Rennsport | Porsche 992 GT3 Cup | Porsche 4.0 L Flat-6 | 985 | (Austria) Felix Neuhofer | Am | 1–2 |
| (Austria) Neuhofer Rennsport | Porsche 992 GT3 Cup | Porsche 4.0 L Flat-6 | 985 | (Germany) Manuel Zlof | Am | 1–2 |
| (Austria) Neuhofer Rennsport | Porsche 992 GT3 Cup | Porsche 4.0 L Flat-6 | 985 | Alexey Denisov (Note: Denisov and Sorokin are Russian, but compete as neutral competitors as Russian national emblems were banned by the FIA due to the Russian invasion of Ukraine.) | Am | 1 |
| (Germany) MRS-GT Racing | Porsche 992 GT3 Cup | Porsche 4.0 L Flat-6 | 988 | (El Salvador) Rolando Saca | Am | 2, 4–5 |
| (Germany) MRS-GT Racing | Porsche 992 GT3 Cup | Porsche 4.0 L Flat-6 | 988 | (Estonia) Antti Rammo | Am | 2, 5 |
| (Germany) MRS-GT Racing | Porsche 992 GT3 Cup | Porsche 4.0 L Flat-6 | 988 | (Costa Rica) Amadéo Quiros | Am | 2, 5 |
| (Germany) MRS-GT Racing | Porsche 992 GT3 Cup | Porsche 4.0 L Flat-6 | 988 | (United States) Pedro Torres | Am | 2 |
| (Germany) MRS-GT Racing | Porsche 992 GT3 Cup | Porsche 4.0 L Flat-6 | 988 | (Portugal) Ricardo Costa | Am | 3 |
| (Germany) MRS-GT Racing | Porsche 992 GT3 Cup | Porsche 4.0 L Flat-6 | 988 | (United States) Will Langhorne | Am | 3 |
| (Germany) MRS-GT Racing | Porsche 992 GT3 Cup | Porsche 4.0 L Flat-6 | 988 | (Germany) Marco Müller | Am | 3 |
| (Germany) MRS-GT Racing | Porsche 992 GT3 Cup | Porsche 4.0 L Flat-6 | 988 | (Hong Kong) Shaun Thong | Am | 3 |
| (Germany) MRS-GT Racing | Porsche 992 GT3 Cup | Porsche 4.0 L Flat-6 | 988 | (Hong Kong) Terence Tse | Am | 3 |
| (Germany) MRS-GT Racing | Porsche 992 GT3 Cup | Porsche 4.0 L Flat-6 | 988 | (Switzerland) Silvain Pastoris | Am | 4 |
| (Germany) MRS-GT Racing | Porsche 992 GT3 Cup | Porsche 4.0 L Flat-6 | 988 | (Lithuania) Mantas Janavicius | Am | 4 |
| (Germany) MRS-GT Racing | Porsche 992 GT3 Cup | Porsche 4.0 L Flat-6 | 988 | (Costa Rica) Charlie Fonseca | Am | 5 |
| (Germany) MRS-GT Racing | Porsche 992 GT3 Cup | Porsche 4.0 L Flat-6 | 988 | (Finland) Jukka Honkavuori | Am | 5 |
| (Lithuania) Porsche Baltic | Porsche 992 GT3 Cup | Porsche 4.0 L Flat-6 | 993 | (Lithuania) Robertas Kupcikas | Am 1 P 1 | 1–2 |
| (Lithuania) Porsche Baltic | Porsche 992 GT3 Cup | Porsche 4.0 L Flat-6 | 993 | (Lithuania) Domas Raudonis | Am 1 P 1 | 1–2 |
| (Lithuania) Porsche Baltic | Porsche 992 GT3 Cup | Porsche 4.0 L Flat-6 | 993 | (Lithuania) Tautvydas Rudokas | Am 1 P 1 | 1–2 |
| (Lithuania) Porsche Baltic | Porsche 992 GT3 Cup | Porsche 4.0 L Flat-6 | 993 | (Lithuania) Eduardas Klepikas | Am 1 P 1 | 1 |
GT4
| (Sweden) ALFAB Racing | McLaren Artura GT4 | McLaren M630 3.0 L Turbo V6 | 400 | (Sweden) Erik Behrens | | 2 |
| (Sweden) ALFAB Racing | McLaren Artura GT4 | McLaren M630 3.0 L Turbo V6 | 400 | (Sweden) Daniel Roos | | 2 |
| (Lithuania) GSR Motorsport | Ginetta G56 GT4 | GM LS3 6.2 L V8 | 405 | (Lithuania) Egidijus Gelūnas | | 3, 5 |
| (Lithuania) GSR Motorsport | Ginetta G56 GT4 | GM LS3 6.2 L V8 | 405 | (Lithuania) Aras Kvedaras | | 3, 5 |
| (Lithuania) GSR Motorsport | Ginetta G56 GT4 | GM LS3 6.2 L V8 | 405 | (Lithuania) Rokas Kvedaras | | 3, 5 |
| (Lithuania) GSR Motorsport | Ginetta G56 GT4 | GM LS3 6.2 L V8 | 405 | (Lithuania) Mindaugas Liatukas | | 3, 5 |
| (Lithuania) GSR Motorsport | Ginetta G56 GT4 | GM LS3 6.2 L V8 | 405 | (Lithuania) Ernesta Globytė | | 3 |
| (Lithuania) GSR Motorsport | Ginetta G56 GT4 | GM LS3 6.2 L V8 | 405 | (Lithuania) Dovydas Ketvirtis | | 5 |
| (Belgium) Street Art Racing | Aston Martin Vantage AMR GT4 | Aston Martin M177 4.0 L Twin-Turbo V8 | 407 | (Switzerland) Pascal Bachmann | | 4 |
| (Belgium) Street Art Racing | Aston Martin Vantage AMR GT4 | Aston Martin M177 4.0 L Twin-Turbo V8 | 407 | (France) Julien Darras | | 4 |
| (Belgium) Street Art Racing | Aston Martin Vantage AMR GT4 | Aston Martin M177 4.0 L Twin-Turbo V8 | 407 | (France) Jahid Fazal Karim | | 4 |
| (Slovenia) Apex MP Racing | KTM X-Bow GT4 | Audi 4.0 L I4 | 414 | (Slovenia) Mihael Ambroz | | 5 |
| (Slovenia) Apex MP Racing | KTM X-Bow GT4 | Audi 4.0 L I4 | 414 | (United Kingdom) Peter Matic | | 5 |
| (Slovenia) Apex MP Racing | KTM X-Bow GT4 | Audi 4.0 L I4 | 414 | (Serbia) Miloš Pavlović | | 5 |
| (Slovenia) Apex MP Racing | KTM X-Bow GT4 | Audi 4.0 L I4 | 414 | (Italy) Alessio Ruffini | | 5 |
| (Spain) NM Racing Team | Mercedes-AMG GT4 | Mercedes-AMG M178 4.0 L V8 | 415 | (Spain) Guillermo Aso | | 5 |
| (Spain) NM Racing Team | Mercedes-AMG GT4 | Mercedes-AMG M178 4.0 L V8 | 415 | (United States) Keith Gatehouse | | 5 |
| (Spain) NM Racing Team | Mercedes-AMG GT4 | Mercedes-AMG M178 4.0 L V8 | 415 | (Switzerland) Maximilien Huber | | 5 |
| (Spain) NM Racing Team | Mercedes-AMG GT4 | Mercedes-AMG M178 4.0 L V8 | 415 | (Spain) Manel Lao Cornago | | 5 |
| (Spain) NM Racing Team | Mercedes-AMG GT4 | Mercedes-AMG M178 4.0 L V8 | 415 | Igor Sorokin | | 5 |
| (United Arab Emirates) Buggyra ZM Racing | Mercedes-AMG GT4 | Mercedes-AMG M178 4.0 L V8 | 416 | (Seychelles) Aliyyah Koloc | | 1–4 |
| (United Arab Emirates) Buggyra ZM Racing | Mercedes-AMG GT4 | Mercedes-AMG M178 4.0 L V8 | 416 | (Czech Republic) Adam Lacko | | 1–4 |
| (United Arab Emirates) Buggyra ZM Racing | Mercedes-AMG GT4 | Mercedes-AMG M178 4.0 L V8 | 416 | (Czech Republic) David Vrsecky | | 1–4 |
| (United Arab Emirates) Buggyra ZM Racing | Mercedes-AMG GT4 | Mercedes-AMG M178 4.0 L V8 | 416 | (Czech Republic) Jaroslav Janiš | | 3 |
| (Spain) PCR Sport | Mercedes-AMG GT4 | Mercedes-AMG M178 4.0 L V8 | 418 | (Spain) Harriet Arruabarrena | | 1 |
| (Spain) PCR Sport | Mercedes-AMG GT4 | Mercedes-AMG M178 4.0 L V8 | 418 | (Spain) Vicente Dasi | | 1 |
| (Spain) PCR Sport | Mercedes-AMG GT4 | Mercedes-AMG M178 4.0 L V8 | 418 | (Spain) Josep Parera | | 1 |
| (Belgium) Hamofa Motorsport | BMW M4 GT4 Gen II | BMW N55 3.0 L Twin-Turbo I6 | 419 | (Belgium) Kris Verhoeven | | 2, 4 |
| (Belgium) Hamofa Motorsport | BMW M4 GT4 Gen II | BMW N55 3.0 L Twin-Turbo I6 | 419 | (Belgium) Mark Verhoeven | | 2, 4 |
| (Belgium) Hamofa Motorsport | BMW M4 GT4 Gen II | BMW N55 3.0 L Twin-Turbo I6 | 419 | (Belgium) Rob Verhoeven | | 2, 4 |
| (United Kingdom) Venture Engineering | Mercedes-AMG GT4 | Mercedes-AMG M178 4.0 L V8 | 421 | (United Kingdom) Matthew George | | 5 |
| (United Kingdom) Venture Engineering | Mercedes-AMG GT4 | Mercedes-AMG M178 4.0 L V8 | 421 | (United Kingdom) Owen Hizzey | | 5 |
| (United Kingdom) Venture Engineering | Mercedes-AMG GT4 | Mercedes-AMG M178 4.0 L V8 | 421 | (United Kingdom) Christopher Jones | | 5 |
| (United Kingdom) Venture Engineering | Mercedes-AMG GT4 | Mercedes-AMG M178 4.0 L V8 | 421 | (United Kingdom) Neville Jones | | 5 |
| (Germany) Lionspeed GP | Porsche 718 Cayman GT4 RS Clubsport | Porsche 4.0 L Flat-6 | 424 | (Germany) Dennis Bohn | | All |
| (Germany) Lionspeed GP | Porsche 718 Cayman GT4 RS Clubsport | Porsche 4.0 L Flat-6 | 424 | (United States) José Garcia | | All |
| (Germany) Lionspeed GP | Porsche 718 Cayman GT4 RS Clubsport | Porsche 4.0 L Flat-6 | 424 | (Germany) Patrick Kolb | | All |
| (Germany) Lionspeed GP | Porsche 718 Cayman GT4 RS Clubsport | Porsche 4.0 L Flat-6 | 424 | (United States) Daniel Miller | | 1–2, 5 |
| (Germany) Lionspeed GP | Porsche 718 Cayman GT4 RS Clubsport | Porsche 4.0 L Flat-6 | 424 | (Switzerland) Patric Niederhauser | | 3 |
| (Canada) ST Racing | BMW M4 GT4 Gen II | BMW N55 3.0 L Twin-Turbo I6 | 428 | (Belgium) Fabian Duffieux | | 5 |
| (Canada) ST Racing | BMW M4 GT4 Gen II | BMW N55 3.0 L Twin-Turbo I6 | 428 | (United Kingdom) Pippa Mann | | 5 |
| (Canada) ST Racing | BMW M4 GT4 Gen II | BMW N55 3.0 L Twin-Turbo I6 | 428 | (United States) Jon Miller | | 5 |
| (Canada) ST Racing | BMW M4 GT4 Gen II | BMW N55 3.0 L Twin-Turbo I6 | 428 | (Canada) Samantha Tan | | 5 |
| (Canada) ST Racing | BMW M4 GT4 Gen II | BMW N55 3.0 L Twin-Turbo I6 | 428 | (United States) Neil Verhagen | | 5 |
| (Switzerland) Hofor Racing by Bonk Motorsport | BMW M4 GT4 Gen II | BMW N55 3.0 L Twin-Turbo I6 | 432 | (Switzerland) Martin Kroll | | 1 |
| (Switzerland) Hofor Racing by Bonk Motorsport | BMW M4 GT4 Gen II | BMW N55 3.0 L Twin-Turbo I6 | 432 | (Germany) Michael Mayer | | 1 |
| (Switzerland) Hofor Racing by Bonk Motorsport | BMW M4 GT4 Gen II | BMW N55 3.0 L Twin-Turbo I6 | 432 | (Germany) Rainer Partl | | 1 |
| (United Kingdom) Simpson Motorsport | BMW M4 GT4 Gen II | BMW N55 3.0 L Twin-Turbo I6 | 438 | (United Kingdom) Ravi Ramyead | | 2 |
| (United Kingdom) Simpson Motorsport | BMW M4 GT4 Gen II | BMW N55 3.0 L Twin-Turbo I6 | 438 | (United Kingdom) Charlie Robertson | | 2 |
| (United Kingdom) Simpson Motorsport | BMW M4 GT4 Gen II | BMW N55 3.0 L Twin-Turbo I6 | 438 | (Cyprus) Vasily Vladykin | | 2 |
| (South Africa) Team Africa Le Mans | Ginetta G55 GT4 | Ford Cyclone 3.7 L V6 | 455 | (Netherlands) Jeroen Bleekemolen | | 5 |
| (South Africa) Team Africa Le Mans | Ginetta G55 GT4 | Ford Cyclone 3.7 L V6 | 455 | (Netherlands) Jan Lammers | | 5 |
| (South Africa) Team Africa Le Mans | Ginetta G55 GT4 | Ford Cyclone 3.7 L V6 | 455 | (South Africa) Greg Mills | | 5 |
| (South Africa) Team Africa Le Mans | Ginetta G55 GT4 | Ford Cyclone 3.7 L V6 | 455 | (Italy) Cristoforo Pirro | | 5 |
| (South Africa) Team Africa Le Mans | Ginetta G55 GT4 | Ford Cyclone 3.7 L V6 | 455 | (Italy) Emanuele Pirro | | 5 |
| (France) W Autosport | Toyota GR Supra GT4 | BMW B58B30 3.0 L Twin-Turbo I6 | 491 | (France) Thierry Chkondali | | 3 |
| (France) W Autosport | Toyota GR Supra GT4 | BMW B58B30 3.0 L Twin-Turbo I6 | 491 | (Switzerland) Caryl Fritsché | | 3 |
| (France) W Autosport | Toyota GR Supra GT4 | BMW B58B30 3.0 L Twin-Turbo I6 | 491 | (France) Marc Girard | | 3 |
| (France) W Autosport | Toyota GR Supra GT4 | BMW B58B30 3.0 L Twin-Turbo I6 | 491 | (France) Thomas Leal | | 3 |
| (France) W Autosport | Toyota GR Supra GT4 | BMW B58B30 3.0 L Twin-Turbo I6 | 491 | (Canada) Michel Sallenbach | | 3 |
TCX
| (Germany) asBest Racing | SEAT León Cup Racer | Volkswagen 2.0 L I4 | 101 | (Germany) Thomas Ardelt | | 5 |
| (Germany) asBest Racing | SEAT León Cup Racer | Volkswagen 2.0 L I4 | 101 | (Austria) Peter Baumann | | 5 |
| (Germany) asBest Racing | SEAT León Cup Racer | Volkswagen 2.0 L I4 | 101 | (Germany) Kim Berwanger | | 5 |
| (Germany) asBest Racing | SEAT León Cup Racer | Volkswagen 2.0 L I4 | 101 | (Japan) Luigi Stanco | | 5 |
| (Germany) SR Motorsport | Porsche 718 Cayman GT4 Clubsport | Porsche 3.8 L Flat-6 | 111 | (Germany) Michael Sander | | 4 |
| (Germany) SR Motorsport | Porsche 718 Cayman GT4 Clubsport | Porsche 3.8 L Flat-6 | 111 | (Germany) Wilhelm Kühne | | 4 |
| (Germany) SR Motorsport | Porsche 718 Cayman GT4 Clubsport | Porsche 3.8 L Flat-6 | 111 | (Germany) Tim Neuser | | 4 |
| (France) PR-V | Peugeot 308 Racing Cup | Peugeot PSA Prince 1.6 L I4 | 125 | (Germany) Christian Gloz | | 3 |
| (France) PR-V | Peugeot 308 Racing Cup | Peugeot PSA Prince 1.6 L I4 | 125 | (France) Hervé Houdré | | 3 |
| (France) PR-V | Peugeot 308 Racing Cup | Peugeot PSA Prince 1.6 L I4 | 125 | (France) Alain Remi | | 3 |
| (France) PR-V | Peugeot 308 Racing Cup | Peugeot PSA Prince 1.6 L I4 | 125 | (France) Flavien Remi | | 3 |
| (Germany) SRS Team Sorg Rennsport | Porsche 718 Cayman GT4 Clubsport | Porsche 3.8 L Flat-6 | 127 | (Germany) Henning Eschweiler | | 2, 5 |
| (Germany) SRS Team Sorg Rennsport | Porsche 718 Cayman GT4 Clubsport | Porsche 3.8 L Flat-6 | 127 | (Mexico) Benito Tagle | | 2, 5 |
| (Germany) SRS Team Sorg Rennsport | Porsche 718 Cayman GT4 Clubsport | Porsche 3.8 L Flat-6 | 127 | (Germany) Heinz Jürgen Kroner | | 2 |
| (Germany) SRS Team Sorg Rennsport | Porsche 718 Cayman GT4 Clubsport | Porsche 3.8 L Flat-6 | 127 | (Sweden) Tommy Gråberg | | 5 |
| (Germany) SRS Team Sorg Rennsport | Porsche 718 Cayman GT4 Clubsport | Porsche 3.8 L Flat-6 | 127 | (Germany) Richard Jodexnis | | 5 |
| (United Kingdom) J-Mec Engineering | BMW M3 E46 | BMW 3.0 L I4 | 133 | (United Kingdom) Jimmy Broadbent | | 5 |
| (United Kingdom) J-Mec Engineering | BMW M3 E46 | BMW 3.0 L I4 | 133 | (United Kingdom) Kevin Clarke | | 5 |
| (United Kingdom) J-Mec Engineering | BMW M3 E46 | BMW 3.0 L I4 | 133 | (United Kingdom) James Collins | | 5 |
| (United Kingdom) J-Mec Engineering | BMW M3 E46 | BMW 3.0 L I4 | 133 | (United Kingdom) Nigel Greensall | | 5 |
| (Belgium) HY Racing | Porsche Cayman GTS | Porsche 3.8 L Flat-6 | 169 | (Belgium) "Brody" | | 2 |
| (Belgium) HY Racing | Porsche Cayman GTS | Porsche 3.8 L Flat-6 | 169 | (Italy) Bruno Barbaro | | 2 |
| (Belgium) HY Racing | Porsche Cayman GTS | Porsche 3.8 L Flat-6 | 169 | (Belgium) Jacques Derenne | | 2 |
| (Belgium) HY Racing | Porsche Cayman GTS | Porsche 3.8 L Flat-6 | 169 | (Austria) Seppi Stigler | | 2 |
| (United Kingdom) CWS Engineering | Ginetta G55 Supercup | Ford Cyclone 3.7 L V6 | 178 | (United Kingdom) Daniel Morris | | 2, 4–5 |
| (United Kingdom) CWS Engineering | Ginetta G55 Supercup | Ford Cyclone 3.7 L V6 | 178 | (United Kingdom) Colin White | | 2, 4–5 |
| (United Kingdom) CWS Engineering | Ginetta G55 Supercup | Ford Cyclone 3.7 L V6 | 178 | (Australia) Paul Buccini | | 5 |
| (United Kingdom) CWS Engineering | Ginetta G55 Supercup | Ford Cyclone 3.7 L V6 | 178 | (United Kingdom) Alistair Mackinnon | | 5 |

GT3 entries
| Icon | Class |
|---|---|
| P | GT3-Pro |
| PA | GT3-Pro Am |
| Am | GT3-Am |
992 entries
| Icon | Class |
| P | 992-Pro |
| Am | 992-Am |

== Race results ==
Bold indicates overall winner.

| Event | Circuit | GT3-Pro Winners | GT3-Pro Am Winners | GT3-Am Winners | GTX Winners | 992-Pro Winners | 992-Am Winners | GT4 Winners | TCX Winners | Report |
|---|---|---|---|---|---|---|---|---|---|---|
| 1 | (Italy) Mugello Circuit | **(Netherlands) No. 32 GP Elite** | (Switzerland) No. 8 Boem by Kessel Racing | (Germany) No. 91 Herberth Motorsport | (Germany) No. 719 9und11 Racing | (Belgium) No. 903 Red Ant Racing | (Switzerland) No. 912 Centri Porsche Ticino | (United Arab Emirates) No. 416 Buggyra ZM Racing | No entries | Report |
| 1 | (Italy) Mugello Circuit | **(Netherlands) Lucas Groeneveld** **(Netherlands) Daan van Kuijk** **(Netherlands) Jan van Kuijk** **(Netherlands) Max van Splunteren** | (Italy) Alessandro Cutrera (Italy) Leonardo-Maria del Vecchio (Italy) Marco Frezza (Italy) David Fumanelli (Italy) Marco Talarico | (Germany) Ralf Bohn (United States) Jason Hart (United States) Scott Noble | (Germany) Georg Goder (Germany) Ralf Oehme (Germany) Tim Scheerbarth (Germany) Martin Schlüter | (Belgium) Kobe de Breucker (Belgium) Ayrton Redant (Belgium) Yannick Redant | (Italy) Max Busnelli (Italy) Francesco Fenici (Switzerland) Ivan Jacoma (Switzerland) Valerio Presezzi | (Seychelles) Aliyyah Koloc (Czech Republic) Adam Lacko (Czech Republic) David Vrsecky | No entries | Report |
| 2 | (Belgium) Circuit de Spa-Francorchamps | No entries | (Spain) No. 90 E2P Racing | **(United States) No. 85 CP Racing** | (France) No. 701 Vortex V8 | (Belgium) No. 903 Red Ant Racing | (Germany) No. 907 RPM Racing | (United Arab Emirates) No. 416 Buggyra ZM Racing | (United Kingdom) No. 178 CWS Engineering | Report |
| 2 | (Belgium) Circuit de Spa-Francorchamps | No entries | (Spain) Pablo Burguera (Portugal) Álvaro Parente (Spain) Antonio Sainero | **(United States) Charles Espenlaub** **(United States) Joe Foster** **(United States) Shane Lewis** **(United States) Charles Putman** | (France) Lionel Amrouche (France) Philippe Bonnel (France) Gilles Courtois | (Lithuania) Julius Adomavičius (Belgium) Ayrton Redant (Belgium) Yannick Redant | (Germany) Philip Hamprecht (Sweden) Niclas Jönsson (United States) Tracy Krohn | (Seychelles) Aliyyah Koloc (Czech Republic) Adam Lacko (Czech Republic) David Vrsecky | (United Kingdom) Daniel Morris (United Kingdom) Colin White | Report |
| 3 | (Portugal) Algarve International Circuit | No entries | **(Germany) No. 92 Herberth Motorsport** | (Germany) No. 91 Herberth Motorsport | (France) No. 701 Vortex V8 | (Belgium) No. 903 Red Ant Racing | (Germany) No. 907 RPM Racing | (United Arab Emirates) No. 416 Buggyra ZM Racing | (France) No. 125 PR-V | Report |
| 3 | (Portugal) Algarve International Circuit | No entries | **(Germany) Ralf Bohn** **(Germany) Vincent Kolb** **(Germany) Max Moritz** **(Austria) Felix Neuhofer** **(Germany) Robert Renauer** | (Germany) Ralf Bohn (United States) Jason Hart (United Kingdom) Ian Loggie (United States) Scott Noble | (France) Lionel Amrouche (France) Philippe Bonnel (France) Gilles Courtois (France) Lucas Sugliano | (Belgium) Kobe de Breucker (Netherlands) Lucas van Eijndhoven (Belgium) Ayrton Redant (Belgium) Yannick Redant | (Germany) Philip Hamprecht (Netherlands) Patrick Huisman (Sweden) Niclas Jönsson (United States) Tracy Krohn | (Seychelles) Aliyyah Koloc (Czech Republic) Adam Lacko (Czech Republic) Jaroslav Janis (Czech Republic) David Vrsecky | (Germany) Christian Gloz (France) Hervé Houdré (France) Alain Remi (France) Flavien Remi | Report |
| 4 | (Italy) Misano World Circuit Marco Simoncelli | No finishers | **(France) No. 18 Saintéloc Junior Team** | (Germany) No. 34 Land Motorsport | (France) No. 701 Vortex V8 | (Belgium) No. 904 Red Ant Racing | (Italy) No. 922 Fulgenzi Racing | (United Arab Emirates) No. 416 Buggyra ZM Racing | (Germany) No. 111 SR Motorsport | Report |
| 4 | (Italy) Misano World Circuit Marco Simoncelli | No finishers | **(Austria) Michael Doppelmayr** **(Germany) Elia Erhart** **(Germany) Pierre Kaffer** **(Germany) Swen Herberger** | (Germany) Elmar Grimm (Germany) Dr. Johannes Kirchhof (Germany) Stefan Wieninger | (France) Lionel Amrouche (France) Philippe Bonnel (France) Gilles Courtois | (Belgium) Peter Guelinckx (Belgium) Michiel Haverans (Belgium) Brent Verheyen | (Italy) Andrea Buratti (Italy) Corrado Costa (Italy) Enrico Fernando (United States) Eric Wagner | (Seychelles) Aliyyah Koloc (Czech Republic) Adam Lacko (Czech Republic) David Vrsecky | (Germany) Wilhelm Kühne (Germany) Tim Neuser (Germany) Michael Sander | Report |
| 5 | (Spain) Circuit de Barcelona-Catalunya | (United Kingdom) No. 4 Optimum Motorsport | (France) No. 18 Saintéloc Junior Team | **(Germany) No. 91 Herberth Motorsport** | (France) No. 701 Vortex V8 | (Belgium) No. 903 Red Ant Racing | (Qatar) No. 931 QMMF by HRT | (United Kingdom) No. 421 Venture Engineering | (Germany) No. 127 SRS Team Sorg Rennsport | Report |
| 5 | (Spain) Circuit de Barcelona-Catalunya | (United Kingdom) Todd Coleman (United States) Robert Megennis (Denmark) Frederik Schandorff (United States) Aaron Telitz | (Austria) Michael Doppelmayr (Germany) Elia Erhart (Germany) Christer Jöns (Germany) Pierre Kaffer (France) Stephane Tribaudini | **(United States) Dustin Blattner** **(Germany) Ralf Bohn** **(United States) Jason Hart** **(United States) Scott Noble** | (France) Lionel Amrouche (France) Solenn Amrouche (France) Philippe Bonnel (France) Gilles Courtois | (Belgium) Kobe de Breucker (Belgium) Ayrton Redant (Belgium) Yannick Redant (Belgium) Lars Zaenen | (Qatar) Ibrahim Al-Abdulghani (Qatar) Abdulla Ali Al-Khelaifi (Qatar) Ghanim Ali Al Maadheed (Germany) Julian Hanses | (United Kingdom) Matthew George (United Kingdom) Owen Hizzey (United Kingdom) Christopher Jones (United Kingdom) Neville Jones | (Germany) Henning Eschweiler (Sweden) Tommy Gråberg (Germany) Richard Jodexnis (Mexico) Benito Tagle | Report |

=== Championship standings ===
| Position | **1st** | **2nd** | **3rd** | **4th** | **5th** | **6th** | **7th** | **8th** | **9th** | **10th** | **11th** | **12th** | **13th** | **14th** | **15th** |
| Points | 40 | 36 | 32 | 28 | 24 | 20 | 18 | 16 | 14 | 12 | 10 | 8 | 6 | 4 | 2 |

==== GT3 Drivers' Overall ====
| Pos. | Drivers | Team | (Italy) MUG | (Belgium) SPA | (Portugal) POR | | (Italy) MIS | (Spain) BAR | | Pts. |
| Pos. | Drivers | Team | (Italy) MUG | (Belgium) SPA | 12H | 24H | (Italy) MIS | 12H | 24H | Pts. |
|---|---|---|---|---|---|---|---|---|---|---|
| 1 | (Germany) Ralf Bohn (United States) Jason Hart (United States) Scott Noble | (Germany) No. 91 Herberth Motorsport | 2 | 4 | 1 | 2 | 13 | 1 | 1 | 180 |
| 2 | (Austria) Michael Doppelmayr (Germany) Elia Erhart (Germany) Pierre Kaffer | (France) No. 18 Saintéloc Junior Team | | **6** | **3** | **3** | 1 | 3 | 2 | 160 |
| 3 | (Spain) Pablo Burguera (Portugal) Álvaro Parente (Spain) Antonio Sainero | (Spain) No. 90 E2P Racing | 15† | 5 | 8 | 17† | 21† | 6 | 25† | 104 |
| 4 | (Lithuania) Arunas Geciauskas | (Lithuania) No. 71 Juta Racing | 7 | 7 | | | 2† | 7 | 9 | 101 |
| 5 | (Germany) Sven Herberger | (France) No. 18 Saintéloc Junior Team | | | **3** | **3** | 1 | | | 88 |
| 6 | (Germany) Kenneth Heyer (Germany) Max Partl (Germany) Alexander Prinz (Switzerland) Chantal Prinz | (Switzerland) No. 11 Hofor Racing | 28 | 13 | 6† | Ret | 9† | 10 | 5 | 84 |
| 7 | (Denmark) Kristian Poulsen (Denmark) Roland Poulsen | (Denmark) No. 14 Poulsen Motorsport | 4 | | | | | 4 | 3 | 74 |
| 8 | (United States) Charles Espenlaub (United States) Shane Lewis | (United States) No. 85 CP Racing | 3 | 1 | | | | | | 72 |
| 9 | (Germany) Dr. Johannes Kirchhoff | (Germany) No. 34 Land Motorsport | | 8 | | | 6 | 16 | 11 | 71 |
| 10 | (Switzerland) Michael Kroll | (Switzerland) No. 11 Hofor Racing | 28 | 13 | 6† | Ret | 9† | 10 | 5 | 66 |
| 11 | (Switzerland) Tim Müller | (Antigua and Barbuda) No. 1 HAAS RT | | 2 | | | | | | 64 |
| 11 | (Switzerland) Tim Müller | (Lithuania) No. 69 RD Signs – Siauliai racing team | | | | | 8 | | | 64 |
| 12 | (United States) Dustin Blattner | (Germany) No. 91 Herberth Motorsport | | | | | | 1 | 1 | 60 |
| 13 | (Germany) Vincent Kolb (Germany) Max Moritz (Austria) Felix Neuhofer (Germany) Robert Renauer | (Germany) No. 92 Herberth Motorsport | | | 2 | 1 | | | | 58 |
| 14 | (United Kingdom) Ian Loggie | (Germany) No. 91 Herberth Motorsport | | | 1 | 2 | | | | 56 |
| 15 | (Germany) Elmar Grimm | (Germany) No. 34 Land Motorsport | | | | | 6 | 16 | 11 | 55 |
| 16 | (Germany) Christer Jöns (France) Stephane Tribaudini | (France) No. 18 Saintéloc Junior Team | | | | | | 3 | 2 | 52 |
| 17 | (France) Philippe Chatelet | (France) No. 18 Saintéloc Junior Team | | | **3** | **3** | | | | 48 |
| 18 | (Germany) Jens Klingmann (Sweden) Alfred Nilsson | (Denmark) No. 14 Poulsen Motorsport | | | | | | 4 | 3 | 46 |
| 19 | (Netherlands) Lucas Groeneveld (Netherlands) Daan van Kuijk (Netherlands) Jan van Kuijk (Netherlands) Max van Splunteren | (Netherlands) No. 32 GP Elite | 1 | | | | | | | 40 |
| 19 | (Netherlands) Ivo Breukers (Netherlands) Luc Breukers (Netherlands) Rik Breukers (Switzerland) Fabian Danz | (Netherlands) No. 9 Red Camel by Juta Racing | | | | | | 5 | 4 | 40 |
| 20 | (Germany) Tim Vogler | (Germany) No. 34 Land Motorsport | | 8 | | | | 16 | 11 | 39 |
| 21 | (Sweden) Lukas Sundahl | (Lithuania) No. 71 Juta Racing | 7 | 7 | | | | | | 38 |
| 21 | (Lithuania) Audrius Butkevicius (Italy) Nicola Michelon (Lithuania) Paulius Paskevicius | (Lithuania) No. 69 RD Signs – Siauliai racing team | 29 | Ret | | | 8 | 33† | Ret | 38 |
| 21 | (United Kingdom) Todd Coleman (United States) Robert Megennis (Denmark) Frederik Schandorff (United States) Aaron Telitz | (United Kingdom) No. 4 Optimum Motorsport | | | | | | **2** | **7**† | 38 |
| 22 | (Belgium) Xavier Knauf (Belgium) Gregory Servais | (Antigua and Barbuda) No. 1 HAAS RT | | 2 | | | | | | 36 |
| 22 | (Lithuania) Leonardas Dirzys (Lithuania) Justas Jonusis (Lithuania) Simas Juodvirsis | (Lithuania) No. 71 Juta Racing | | | | | 2† | | | 36 |
| 23 | (United States) Joe Foster (United States) Charles Putman | (United States) No. 85 CP Racing | 3 | 1 | | | | | | 32 |
| 23 | (Hong Kong) Antares Au (Hong Kong) Jonathan Hui (Macau) Kevin Tse | (Germany) No. 80 Car Collection Motorsport | | 3 | | | | | | 32 |
| 23 | (Germany) Stefan Wieninger | (Germany) No. 34 Land Motorsport | | | | | 6 | | | 32 |
| 24 | (Denmark) Christoffer Nygaard | (Denmark) No. 14 Poulsen Motorsport | 4 | | | | | | | 28 |
| 25 | (Lithuania) Sigitas Ambrazevicius (New Zealand) Francois Beziac (Lithuania) Eimantas Navikauskas (Slovakia) Martin Ryba | (Lithuania) No. 71 Juta Racing | | | | | | 7 | 9 | 27 |
| 26 | (Italy) Alessandro Cutrera (Italy) Marco Frezza (Italy) David Fumanelli | (Switzerland) No. 8 Boem by Kessel Racing | **5** | | | | Ret | | | 24 |
| 26 | (Italy) Marco Talarico | (Switzerland) No. 8 Boem by Kessel Racing | **5** | | | | | | | 24 |
| 26 | (Spain) Javier Morcillo | (Spain) No. 90 E2P Racing | | | | | | 6 | 25† | 24 |
| 27 | (Norway) Wiggo Dalmo | (Germany) No. 34 Land Motorsport | | 8 | | | | 16 | 11 | 23 |
| 27 | (Germany) Ingo Vogler | (Germany) No. 34 Land Motorsport | | | | | | 16 | 11 | 23 |
| 28 | (United States) "Hash" (Switzerland) Alex Fontana (Switzerland) Ivan Jacoma (Switzerland) Yannick Mettler | (Germany) No. 12 Car Collection Motorsport | 25† | 18 | | | | | | 22 |
| 29 | (Switzerland) Ernst Inderbitzin | (France) No. 18 Saintéloc Junior Team | | **6** | | | | | | 20 |
| 29 | (Australia) John Corbett (United Kingdom) Casper Stevenson | (Lithuania) No. 71 Juta Racing | 7 | | | | | | | 20 |
| 30 | (Canada) Roman De Angelis (United Kingdom) Ian James (United States) Gray Newell | (United States) No. 27 Heart of Racing by SPS | 8 | | | | | | | 18 |
| 30 | (Italy) Corinna Gostner (Italy) David Gostner (Italy) Manuela Gostner (Italy) Thomas Gostner | (Italy) No. 58 MP Racing | 26† | 20 | | | | | | 18 |
| 30 | (United Kingdom) Lars Viljoen | (Lithuania) No. 71 Juta Racing | | 7 | | | | | | 18 |
| 30 | (New Zealand) Earl Bamber (New Zealand) Heremana Malmezac (Australia) Liam Talbot | (Australia) No. 42 Prime Speed Sport | | | | | 14 | | | 18 |
| 31 | (Germany) Max Edelhoff | (Germany) No. 34 Land Motorsport | | 8 | | | | | | 16 |
| 31 | (Australia) Theo Koundouris (Australia) Sergio Pires (Australia) Marcel Zalloua | (Antigua and Barbuda) No. 2 HAAS RT | | | | | 16† | | | 16 |
| 32 | (United States) Lisa Clark (Canada) Kyle Marcelli (United States) Jeff Westphal | (Italy) No. 29 Pellin Racing | 17 | | | | | | | 14 |
| 32 | (Germany) Jay Mo Härtling (Poland) Martin Kaczmarski (Poland) Mateusz Lisowski | (Poland) No. 74 PTT by Schnitzelalm Racing | | | | | **17**† | | | 14 |
| 33 | (Switzerland) Alexandre Bochez (Switzerland) Mickaël Bochez (Turkey) Murat Cahadaroglu (Italy) Felice Jelmini | (Switzerland) No. 5 Kessel Racing | 21 | | | | | | | 12 |
| 34 | (Slovakia) Miro Konôpka (Slovakia) Zdeno Mikulasko | (Slovakia) No. 44 ARC Bratislava | | 26 | | | | Ret | Ret | 8 |
| 34 | (Slovakia) Anton Kiaba (Guatemala) Mateo Llarena | (Slovakia) No. 44 ARC Bratislava | | 26 | | | | | | 8 |
| | (Italy) Leonardo-Maria del Vecchio | (Switzerland) No. 8 Boem by Kessel Racing | **5** | | | | Ret | | | 0 |
| | (Malaysia) Adrian D'Silva (Australia) Shae Davies (Estonia) Martin Rump | (New Zealand) No. 84 EBM | | Ret | | | | | | 0 |
| | (United Kingdom) Andrew Gilbert (Switzerland) Nicolò Rosi (Spain) Fran Rueda (Netherlands) Fons Scheltema | (Switzerland) No. 5 Kessel Racing | | Ret | | | | | | 0 |
| | (Australia) Brenton Grove (Australia) Stephen Grove (Australia) Matthew Payne (Australia) Garth Tander | (Australia) No. 10 Grove Racing | | | Ret | Ret | | | | 0 |
| | (Czech Republic) Petr Brecka (Slovakia) Adam Konôpka (Poland) Andrzej Lewandowski | (Slovakia) No. 44 ARC Bratislava | | | | | | Ret | Ret | 0 |
| Pos. | Drivers | Team | (Italy) MUG | (Belgium) SPA | (Portugal) POR | | (Italy) MIS | (Spain) BAR | | Pts. |
| Pos. | Drivers | Team | (Italy) MUG | (Belgium) SPA | 12H | 24H | (Italy) MIS | 12H | 24H | Pts. |

| Colour | Result |
|---|---|
| Gold | Winner |
| Silver | Second place |
| Bronze | Third place |
| Green | Points classification |
| Blue | Non-points classification |
| Blue | Non-classified finish (NC) |
| Purple | Retired, not classified (Ret) |
| Red | Did not qualify (DNQ) |
| Red | Did not pre-qualify (DNPQ) |
| Black | Disqualified (DSQ) |
| White | Did not start (DNS) |
| White | Withdrew (WD) |
| White | Race cancelled (C) |
| Blank | Did not practice (DNP) |
| Blank | Did not arrive (DNA) |
| Blank | Excluded (EX) |

**Bold** – Pole
Italics – Fastest Lap

† – Drivers did not finish the race, but were classified as they completed over 60% of the class winner's race distance.

==== GT3 Teams' Overall ====
| Pos. | Team | Car | (Italy) MUG | (Belgium) SPA | (Portugal) POR | | (Italy) MIS | (Spain) BAR | | Pts. |
| Pos. | Team | Car | (Italy) MUG | (Belgium) SPA | 12H | 24H | (Italy) MIS | 12H | 24H | Pts. |
|---|---|---|---|---|---|---|---|---|---|---|
| 1 | (Germany) No. 91 Herberth Motorsport | Porsche 911 GT3 R (992) | 2 | 4 | 1 | 2 | 13 | 1 | 1 | 180 |
| 2 | (France) No. 18 Saintéloc Junior Team | Audi R8 LMS Evo II | | **6** | **3** | **3** | 1 | 3 | 2 | 160 |
| 3 | (Spain) No. 90 E2P Racing | Porsche 911 GT3 R (991.2) | 15† | 5 | 8 | 17† | 21† | 6 | 25† | 104 |
| 4 | (Lithuania) No. 71 Juta Racing | Audi R8 LMS Evo II | 7 | 7 | | | 2† | 7 | 9 | 101 |
| 5 | (Switzerland) No. 11 Hofor Racing | Mercedes-AMG GT3 | 28 | 13 | 6† | Ret | 9† | 10 | 5 | 84 |
| 6 | (Denmark) No. 14 Poulsen Motorsport | BMW M4 GT3 | 4 | | | | | 4 | 3 | 74 |
| 7 | (United States) No. 85 CP Racing | Mercedes-AMG GT3 Evo | 3 | 1 | | | | | | 72 |
| 8 | (Germany) No. 34 Land Motorsport | Audi R8 LMS Evo II | | 8 | | | 6 | 16 | 11 | 71 |
| 9 | (Germany) No. 92 Herberth Motorsport | Porsche 911 GT3 R (992) | | | 2 | 1 | | | | 58 |
| 10 | (Antigua and Barbuda) No. 1 HAAS RT | Audi R8 LMS Evo II | | 2 | | | 16† | | | 52 |
| 11 | (Netherlands) No. 32 GP Elite | Porsche 911 GT3 R (992) | 1 | | | | | | | 40 |
| 11 | (Netherlands) No. 9 Red Camel by Juta Racing | Audi R8 LMS Evo II | | | | | | 5 | 4 | 40 |
| 12 | (United Kingdom) No. 4 Optimum Motorsport | McLaren 720S GT3 Evo | | | | | | **2** | **7**† | 38 |
| 12 | (Lithuania) No. 69 RD Signs – Siauliai racing team | Lamborghini Huracán GT3 Evo | 29 | Ret | | | 8 | 33† | Ret | 38 |
| 13 | (Germany) No. 80 Car Collection Motorsport | Porsche 911 GT3 R (992) | | 3 | | | | | | 32 |
| 14 | (Switzerland) No. 8 Boem by Kessel Racing | Ferrari 296 GT3 | **5** | | | | Ret | | | 24 |
| 15 | (Germany) No. 12 Car Collection Motorsport | Porsche 911 GT3 R (992) | 25† | 18 | | | | | | 22 |
| 16 | (United States) No. 27 Heart of Racing by SPS | Mercedes-AMG GT3 Evo | 8 | | | | | | | 18 |
| 16 | (Italy) No. 58 MP Racing | Mercedes-AMG GT3 Evo | 26† | 20 | | | | | | 18 |
| 16 | (Australia) No. 42 Prime Speed Sport | Aston Martin Vantage AMR GT3 Evo | | | | | 14 | | | 18 |
| 17 | (Italy) No. 29 Pellin Racing | Ferrari 488 GT3 Evo 2020 | 17 | | | | | | | 14 |
| 17 | (Poland) No. 74 PTT by Schnitzelalm Racing | Mercedes-AMG GT3 Evo | | | | | **17**† | | | 14 |
| 18 | (Switzerland) No. 5 Kessel Racing | Ferrari 296 GT3 | 21 | Ret | | | | | | 12 |
| 19 | (Slovakia) No. 44 ARC Bratislava | Lamborghini Huracán GT3 Evo | | 26 | | | | Ret | Ret | 8 |
| | (New Zealand) No. 84 EBM | Porsche 911 GT3 R (992) | | Ret | | | | | | 0 |
| | (Australia) No. 10 Grove Racing | Mercedes-AMG GT3 Evo | | | Ret | Ret | | | | 0 |
| Pos. | Team | Car | (Italy) MUG | (Belgium) SPA | (Portugal) POR | | (Italy) MIS | (Spain) BAR | | Pts. |
| Pos. | Team | Car | (Italy) MUG | (Belgium) SPA | 12H | 24H | (Italy) MIS | 12H | 24H | Pts. |

† – Drivers did not finish the race, but were classified as they completed over 60% of the class winner's race distance.

==== GT3 Pro Am Drivers' ====
| Pos. | Drivers | Team | (Italy) MUG | (Belgium) SPA | (Portugal) POR | | (Italy) MIS | (Spain) BAR | | Pts. |
| Pos. | Drivers | Team | (Italy) MUG | (Belgium) SPA | 12H | 24H | (Italy) MIS | 12H | 24H | Pts. |
|---|---|---|---|---|---|---|---|---|---|---|
| 1 | (Austria) Michael Doppelmayr (Germany) Elia Erhart (Germany) Pierre Kaffer | (France) No. 18 Saintéloc Junior Team | | **6** | **3** | **3** | **1** | **3** | **2** | 190 |
| 2 | (Spain) Pablo Burguera (Portugal) Álvaro Parente (Spain) Antonio Sainero | (Spain) No. 90 E2P Racing | 15† | 5 | 8 | 17† | 21† | 6 | 25† | 162 |
| 3 | (Lithuania) Arunas Geciauskas | (Lithuania) No. 71 Juta Racing | 7 | 7 | | | 2† | | | 104 |
| 4 | (Germany) Swen Herberger | (France) No. 18 Saintéloc Junior Team | | | **3** | **3** | **1** | | | 190 |
| 5 | (Sweden) Lukas Sundahl | (Lithuania) No. 71 Juta Racing | 7 | 7 | | | | | | 68 |
| 6 | (Germany) Ralf Bohn (Germany) Vincent Kolb (Germany) Max Moritz (Austria) Felix Neuhofer (Germany) Robert Renauer | (Germany) No. 92 Herberth Motorsport | | | 2 | 1 | | | | 60 |
| 6 | (Germany) Christer Jöns (France) Stephane Tribaudini | (France) No. 18 Saintéloc Junior Team | | | | | | **3** | **2** | 60 |
| 7 | (United States) "Hash" (Switzerland) Alex Fontana (Switzerland) Ivan Jacoma (Switzerland) Yannick Mettler | (Germany) No. 12 Car Collection Motorsport | 25† | 18 | | | | | | 56 |
| 8 | (Germany) Jens Klingmann (Sweden) Alfred Nilsson (Denmark) Kristian Poulsen (Denmark) Roland Poulsen | (Denmark) No. 14 Poulsen Motorsport | | | | | | 4 | 3 | 54 |
| 8 | (France) Philippe Chatelet | (France) No. 18 Saintéloc Junior Team | | | **3** | **3** | | | | 54 |
| 9 | (Netherlands) Ivo Breukers (Netherlands) Luc Breukers (Netherlands) Rik Breukers (Switzerland) Fabian Danz | (Netherlands) No. 9 Red Camel by Juta Racing | | | | | | 5 | 4 | 48 |
| 10 | (Spain) Javier Morcillo | (Spain) No. 90 E2P Racing | | | | | | 6 | 25† | 42 |
| 11 | (Italy) Alessandro Cutrera (Italy) Marco Frezza (Italy) David Fumanelli (Italy) Marco Talarico | (Switzerland) No. 8 Boem by Kessel Racing | **5** | | | | | | | 40 |
| 12 | (Lithuania) Leonardas Dirzys (Lithuania) Justas Jonusis (Lithuania) Simas Juodvirsis | (Lithuania) No. 71 Juta Racing | | | | | 2† | | | 36 |
| 12 | (Switzerland) Ernst Inderbitzin | (France) No. 18 Saintéloc Junior Team | | **6** | | | | | | 36 |
| 12 | (Australia) John Corbett (United Kingdom) Casper Stevenson | (Lithuania) No. 71 Juta Racing | 7 | | | | | | | 36 |
| 13 | (United Kingdom) Lars Viljoen | (Lithuania) No. 71 Juta Racing | | 7 | | | | | | 32 |
| 13 | (New Zealand) Earl Bamber (New Zealand) Heremana Malmezac (Australia) Liam Talbot | (Australia) No. 42 Prime Speed Sport | | | | | 14 | | | 40 |
| 14 | (Lithuania) Audrius Butkevicius (Italy) Nicola Michelon (Lithuania) Paulius Paskevicius | (Lithuania) No. 69 RD Signs – Siauliai racing team | 29 | Ret | | | | | | 24 |
| | (Italy) Leonardo-Maria del Vecchio | (Switzerland) No. 8 Boem by Kessel Racing | **5** | | | | | | | 0 |
| | (Malaysia) Adrian D'Silva (Australia) Shae Davies (Estonia) Martin Rump | (New Zealand) No. 84 EBM | | Ret | | | | | | 0 |
| | (Australia) Brenton Grove (Australia) Stephen Grove (Australia) Matthew Payne (Australia) Garth Tander | (Australia) No. 10 Grove Racing | | | Ret | Ret | | | | 0 |
| Pos. | Drivers | Team | (Italy) MUG | (Belgium) SPA | (Portugal) POR | | (Italy) MIS | (Spain) BAR | | Pts. |
| Pos. | Drivers | Team | (Italy) MUG | (Belgium) SPA | 12H | 24H | (Italy) MIS | 12H | 24H | Pts. |

| Colour | Result |
|---|---|
| Gold | Winner |
| Silver | Second place |
| Bronze | Third place |
| Green | Points classification |
| Blue | Non-points classification |
| Blue | Non-classified finish (NC) |
| Purple | Retired, not classified (Ret) |
| Red | Did not qualify (DNQ) |
| Red | Did not pre-qualify (DNPQ) |
| Black | Disqualified (DSQ) |
| White | Did not start (DNS) |
| White | Withdrew (WD) |
| White | Race cancelled (C) |
| Blank | Did not practice (DNP) |
| Blank | Did not arrive (DNA) |
| Blank | Excluded (EX) |

**Bold** – Pole
Italics – Fastest Lap

==== GT3 Pro Am Teams' ====
| Pos. | Team | Car | (Italy) MUG | (Belgium) SPA | (Portugal) POR | | (Italy) MIS | (Spain) BAR | | Pts. |
| Pos. | Team | Car | (Italy) MUG | (Belgium) SPA | 12H | 24H | (Italy) MIS | 12H | 24H | Pts. |
|---|---|---|---|---|---|---|---|---|---|---|
| 1 | (France) No. 18 Saintéloc Junior Team | Audi R8 LMS Evo II | | **6** | **3** | **3** | **1** | **3** | **2** | 190 |
| 2 | (Spain) No. 90 E2P Racing | Porsche 911 GT3 R (991.2) | 15† | 5 | 8 | 17† | 21† | 6 | 25† | 162 |
| 3 | (Lithuania) No. 71 Juta Racing | Audi R8 LMS Evo II | 7 | 7 | | | 2† | | | 104 |
| 4 | (Germany) No. 92 Herberth Motorsport | Porsche 911 GT3 R (992) | | | 2 | 1 | | | | 60 |
| 5 | (Germany) No. 12 Car Collection Motorsport | Porsche 911 GT3 R (992) | 25† | 18 | | | | | | 56 |
| 6 | (Denmark) No. 14 Poulsen Motorsport | BMW M4 GT3 | | | | | | 4 | 3 | 54 |
| 7 | (Netherlands) No. 9 Red Camel by Juta Racing | Audi R8 LMS Evo II | | | | | | 5 | 4 | 48 |
| 8 | (Switzerland) No. 8 Boem by Kessel Racing | Ferrari 296 GT3 | **5** | | | | | | | 40 |
| 9 | (Australia) No. 42 Prime Speed Sport | Aston Martin Vantage AMR GT3 Evo | | | | | 14 | | | 40 |
| 10 | (Lithuania) No. 69 RD Signs – Siauliai racing team | Lamborghini Huracán GT3 Evo | 29 | Ret | | | | | | 24 |
| | (New Zealand) No. 84 EBM | Porsche 911 GT3 R (992) | | Ret | | | | | | 0 |
| | (Australia) No. 10 Grove Racing | Mercedes-AMG GT3 Evo | | | Ret | Ret | | | | 0 |
| Pos. | Team | Car | (Italy) MUG | (Belgium) SPA | (Portugal) POR | | (Italy) MIS | (Spain) BAR | | Pts. |
| Pos. | Team | Car | (Italy) MUG | (Belgium) SPA | 12H | 24H | (Italy) MIS | 12H | 24H | Pts. |

† – Drivers did not finish the race, but were classified as they completed over 60% of the class winner's race distance.

==== GT3 Am Drivers' ====
| Pos. | Drivers | Team | (Italy) MUG | (Belgium) SPA | (Portugal) POR | | (Italy) MIS | (Spain) BAR | | Pts. |
| Pos. | Drivers | Team | (Italy) MUG | (Belgium) SPA | 12H | 24H | (Italy) MIS | 12H | 24H | Pts. |
|---|---|---|---|---|---|---|---|---|---|---|
| 1 | (Germany) Ralf Bohn (United States) Jason Hart (United States) Scott Noble | (Germany) No. 91 Herberth Motorsport | 2 | 4 | **1** | **2** | 13 | 1 | **1** | 188 |
| 2 | (Germany) Kenneth Heyer (Germany) Max Partl (Germany) Alexander Prinz (Switzerland) Chantal Prinz | (Switzerland) No. 11 Hofor Racing | 28 | 13 | 6† | Ret | 9† | 10 | 5 | 122 |
| 3 | (Switzerland) Michael Kroll | (Switzerland) No. 11 Hofor Racing | 28 | 13 | 6† | Ret | 9† | 10 | 5 | 108 |
| 4 | (Germany) Dr. Johannes Kirchhoff | (Germany) No. 34 Land Motorsport | | 8 | | | 6 | 16 | 11 | 106 |
| 5 | (Germany) Elmar Grimm | (Germany) No. 34 Land Motorsport | | | | | 6 | 16 | 11 | 82 |
| 6 | (United States) Charles Espenlaub (United States) Joe Foster (United States) Shane Lewis (United States) Charles Putman | (United States) No. 85 CP Racing | 3 | 1 | | | | | | 76 |
| 7 | (Switzerland) Tim Müller | (Antigua and Barbuda) No. 1 HAAS RT | | 2 | | | | | | 72 |
| 7 | (Switzerland) Tim Müller | (Lithuania) No. 69 RD Signs – Siauliai racing team | | | | | 8 | | | 72 |
| 8 | (Norway) Wiggo Dalmo (Germany) Tim Vogler | (Germany) No. 34 Land Motorsport | | 8 | | | | 16 | 11 | 66 |
| 9 | (United States) Dustin Blattner | (Germany) No. 91 Herberth Motorsport | | | | | | 1 | **1** | 60 |
| 9 | (United Kingdom) Ian Loggie | (Germany) No. 91 Herberth Motorsport | | | **1** | **2** | | | | 60 |
| 10 | (Lithuania) Sigitas Ambrazevicius (New Zealand) Francois Beziac (Lithuania) Arunas Geciauskas (Lithuania) Eimantas Navikauskas (Slovakia) Martin Ryba | (Lithuania) No. 71 Juta Racing | | | | | | 7 | 9 | 50 |
| 11 | (Lithuania) Audrius Butkevicius (Italy) Nicola Michelon (Lithuania) Paulius Paskevicius | (Lithuania) No. 69 RD Signs – Siauliai racing team | | | | | 8 | 33† | Ret | 48 |
| 12 | (Germany) Ingo Vogler | (Germany) No. 34 Land Motorsport | | | | | | 16 | 11 | 42 |
| 13 | (Germany) Stefan Wieninger | (Germany) No. 34 Land Motorsport | | | | | 6 | | | 40 |
| 14 | (Italy) Corinna Gostner (Italy) David Gostner (Italy) Manuela Gostner (Italy) Thomas Gostner | (Italy) No. 58 MP Racing | 26† | 20 | | | | | | 38 |
| 15 | (Belgium) Xavier Knauf (Belgium) Gregory Servais | (Antigua and Barbuda) No. 1 HAAS RT | | 2 | | | | | | 36 |
| 16 | (Denmark) Christoffer Nygaard (Denmark) Kristian Poulsen (Denmark) Roland Poulsen | (Denmark) No. 14 Poulsen Motorsport | 4 | | | | | | | 32 |
| 16 | (Hong Kong) Antares Au (Hong Kong) Jonathan Hui (Macau) Kevin Tse | (Germany) No. 80 Car Collection Motorsport | | 3 | | | | | | 32 |
| 17 | (Canada) Roman De Angelis (United Kingdom) Ian James (United States) Gray Newell | (United States) No. 27 Heart of Racing by SPS | 8 | | | | | | | 28 |
| 18 | (Switzerland) Alexandre Bochez (Switzerland) Mickaël Bochez (Turkey) Murat Cahadaroglu (Italy) Felice Jelmini | (Switzerland) No. 5 Kessel Racing | **21** | | | | | | | 24 |
| 18 | (Australia) Theo Koundouris (Australia) Sergio Pires (Australia) Marcel Zalloua | (Antigua and Barbuda) No. 2 HAAS RT | | | | | 16† | | | 24 |
| 18 | (Germany) Max Edelhoff | (Germany) No. 34 Land Motorsport | | 8 | | | | | | 24 |
| 19 | (Germany) Jay Mo Härtling (Poland) Martin Kaczmarski (Poland) Mateusz Lisowski | (Poland) No. 74 PTT by Schnitzelalm Racing | | | | | **17**† | | | 20 |
| 20 | (Slovakia) Miro Konôpka (Slovakia) Zdeno Mikulasko | (Slovakia) No. 44 ARC Bratislava | | 26 | | | | Ret | Ret | 16 |
| 20 | (Slovakia) Anton Kiaba (Guatemala) Mateo Llarena | (Slovakia) No. 44 ARC Bratislava | | 26 | | | | | | 16 |
| 21 | (Lithuania) Ramunas Capkauskas (Lithuania) Paulius Ruskys | (Lithuania) No. 69 RD Signs – Siauliai racing team | | | | | | 33† | Ret | 12 |
| | (United Kingdom) Andrew Gilbert (Switzerland) Nicolò Rosi (Spain) Fran Rueda (Netherlands) Fons Scheltema | (Switzerland) No. 5 Kessel Racing | | Ret | | | | | | 0 |
| | (Czech Republic) Petr Brecka (Slovakia) Adam Konôpka (Poland) Andrzej Lewandowski | (Slovakia) No. 44 ARC Bratislava | | | | | | Ret | Ret | 0 |
| Pos. | Drivers | Team | (Italy) MUG | (Belgium) SPA | (Portugal) POR | | (Italy) MIS | (Spain) BAR | | Pts. |
| Pos. | Drivers | Team | (Italy) MUG | (Belgium) SPA | 12H | 24H | (Italy) MIS | 12H | 24H | Pts. |

† – Drivers did not finish the race, but were classified as they completed over 60% of the class winner's race distance.

==== GT3 Am Teams' ====
| Pos. | Team | Car | (Italy) MUG | (Belgium) SPA | (Portugal) POR | | (Italy) MIS | (Spain) BAR | | Pts. |
| Pos. | Team | Car | (Italy) MUG | (Belgium) SPA | 12H | 24H | (Italy) MIS | 12H | 24H | Pts. |
|---|---|---|---|---|---|---|---|---|---|---|
| 1 | (Germany) No. 91 Herberth Motorsport | Porsche 911 GT3 R (992) | 2 | 4 | **1** | **2** | 13 | **1** | **1** | 188 |
| 2 | (Switzerland) No. 11 Hofor Racing | Mercedes-AMG GT3 | 28 | 13 | 6† | Ret | 9† | 10 | 5 | 122 |
| 3 | (Germany) No. 34 Land Motorsport | Audi R8 LMS Evo II | | 8 | | | 6 | 16 | 11 | 106 |
| 4 | (United States) No. 85 CP Racing | Mercedes-AMG GT3 Evo | 3 | 1 | | | | | | 76 |
| 5 | (Antigua and Barbuda) No. 1 HAAS RT | Audi R8 LMS Evo II | | 2 | | | 16† | | | 60 |
| 6 | (Lithuania) No. 71 Juta Racing | Audi R8 LMS Evo II | | | | | | 7 | 9 | 50 |
| 7 | (Lithuania) No. 69 RD Signs – Siauliai racing team | Lamborghini Huracán GT3 Evo | | | | | 8 | 33† | Ret | 48 |
| 8 | (Italy) No. 58 MP Racing | Mercedes-AMG GT3 Evo | 26† | 20 | | | | | | 37 |
| 9 | (Denmark) No. 14 Poulsen Motorsport | BMW M4 GT3 | 4 | | | | | | | 32 |
| 9 | (Germany) No. 80 Car Collection Motorsport | Porsche 911 GT3 R (992) | | 3 | | | | | | 32 |
| 10 | (United States) No. 27 Heart of Racing by SPS | Mercedes-AMG GT3 Evo | 8 | | | | | | | 28 |
| 11 | (Switzerland) No. 5 Kessel Racing | Ferrari 488 GT3 Evo 2020 | **21** | Ret | | | | | | 24 |
| 12 | (Poland) No. 74 PTT by Schnitzelalm Racing | Mercedes-AMG GT3 Evo | | | | | **17**† | | | 20 |
| 13 | (Slovakia) No. 44 ARC Bratislava | Lamborghini Huracán GT3 Evo | | 26 | | | | Ret | Ret | 16 |
| Pos. | Team | Car | (Italy) MUG | (Belgium) SPA | (Portugal) POR | | (Italy) MIS | (Spain) BAR | | Pts. |
| Pos. | Team | Car | (Italy) MUG | (Belgium) SPA | 12H | 24H | (Italy) MIS | 12H | 24H | Pts. |

† – Drivers did not finish the race, but were classified as they completed over 60% of the class winner's race distance.

==== GTX Drivers' ====
| Pos. | Drivers | Team | (Italy) MUG | (Belgium) SPA | (Portugal) POR | | (Italy) MIS | (Spain) BAR | | Pts. |
| Pos. | Drivers | Team | (Italy) MUG | (Belgium) SPA | 12H | 24H | (Italy) MIS | 12H | 24H | Pts. |
|---|---|---|---|---|---|---|---|---|---|---|
| 1 | (France) Lionel Amrouche (France) Philippe Bonnel (France) Gilles Courtois | (France) No. 701 Vortex V8 | 31 | 33 | **18** | **15** | **20**† | 26 | 22 | 200 |
| 2 | (France) Lucas Sugliano | (France) No. 701 Vortex V8 | 31 | | **18** | **15** | | | | 180 |
| 2 | (France) Lucas Sugliano | (France) No. 702 Vortex V8 | | **36** | | | | | | 180 |
| 3 | (Germany) Georg Goder (Germany) Tim Scheerbarth (Germany) Martin Schlüter | (Germany) No. 719 9und11 Racing | **30** | 38 | | | | | | 72 |
| 4 | (France) Solenn Amrouche | (France) No. 701 Vortex V8 | | | | | | 26 | 22 | 60 |
| 5 | (Denmark) Simon Birch (Poland) Arthur Chwist (Austria) Daniel Drexel (Austria) Christian Loimayr | (Austria) No. 714 Razoon – More than Racing | | | | | | **29** | **28** | 54 |
| 6 | (France) Cyril Calmon (France) Pierre Fontaine (France) Miguel Moiola | (France) No. 702 Vortex V8 | | | | | | 31 | 29† | 54 |
| 7 | (Germany) Ralf Oehme | (Germany) No. 719 9und11 Racing | **30** | | | | | | | 40 |
| 8 | (France) Arnaud Gomez (France) Olivier Gomez | (France) No. 702 Vortex V8 | | **36** | | | | | | 36 |
| 9 | (United Kingdom) Mike Simpson (United Kingdom) Freddie Tomlinson (United Kingdom) Lawrence Tomlinson | (France) No. 795 Team CMR | | 41† | | | | | | 28 |
| Pos. | Drivers | Team | (Italy) MUG | (Belgium) SPA | (Portugal) POR | | (Italy) MIS | (Spain) BAR | | Pts. |
| Pos. | Drivers | Team | (Italy) MUG | (Belgium) SPA | 12H | 24H | (Italy) MIS | 12H | 24H | Pts. |

† – Drivers did not finish the race, but were classified as they completed over 60% of the class winner's race distance.

==== GTX Teams' ====
| Pos. | Team | Car | (Italy) MUG | (Belgium) SPA | (Portugal) POR | | (Italy) MIS | (Spain) BAR | | Pts. |
| Pos. | Team | Car | (Italy) MUG | (Belgium) SPA | 12H | 24H | (Italy) MIS | 12H | 24H | Pts. |
|---|---|---|---|---|---|---|---|---|---|---|
| 1 | (France) No. 701 Vortex V8 | Vortex 1.0 1 Vortex 2.0 4 | 31 | 33 | **18** | **15** | **20**† | 26 | 22 | 200 |
| 2 | (France) No. 702 Vortex V8 | Vortex 2.0 | | **36** | | | | 31 | 29† | 84 |
| 3 | (Germany) No. 719 9und11 Racing | Porsche 991 GT3 Cup II MR | **30** | 38 | | | | | | 72 |
| 4 | (Austria) No. 714 Razoon – More than Racing | KTM X-Bow GT2 | | | | | | **29** | **28** | 54 |
| 5 | (France) No. 795 Team CMR | Ginetta G56 Cup | | 41† | | | | | | 28 |
| Pos. | Team | Car | (Italy) MUG | (Belgium) SPA | (Portugal) POR | | (Italy) MIS | (Spain) BAR | | Pts. |
| Pos. | Team | Car | (Italy) MUG | (Belgium) SPA | 12H | 24H | (Italy) MIS | 12H | 24H | Pts. |

† – Drivers did not finish the race, but were classified as they completed over 60% of the class winner's race distance.

==== 992 Drivers' ====
| Pos. | Drivers | Team | (Italy) MUG | (Belgium) SPA | (Portugal) POR | | (Italy) MIS | (Spain) BAR | | Pts. |
| Pos. | Drivers | Team | (Italy) MUG | (Belgium) SPA | 12H | 24H | (Italy) MIS | 12H | 24H | Pts. |
|---|---|---|---|---|---|---|---|---|---|---|
| 1 | (Belgium) Ayrton Redant (Belgium) Yannick Redant | (Belgium) No. 903 Red Ant Racing | 6 | **9** | 4 | 4 | **Ret** | **8** | **6** | 200 |
| 2 | (Belgium) Kobe de Breucker | (Belgium) No. 903 Red Ant Racing | 6 | | 4 | 4 | **Ret** | **8** | **6** | 160 |
| 3 | (France) Laurent Misbach | (Switzerland) No. 963 Orchid Racing Team | 9 | | 9 | 8 | | | | 144 |
| 3 | (France) Laurent Misbach | (Switzerland) No. 917 Orchid Racing Team | | 21 | | | 5 | 12 | 13 | 144 |
| 4 | (Germany) Philip Hamprecht (Sweden) Niclas Jönsson (United States) Tracy Krohn | (Germany) No. 907 RPM Racing | **Ret** | 15 | 17 | 19 | 4 | 11 | 10 | 132 |
| 5 | (Belgium) Peter Guelinckx (Belgium) Brent Verheyen | (Belgium) No. 904 Red Ant Racing | 16 | 10 | 7 | 5 | 23† | 14 | 30† | 130 |
| 6 | (Belgium) Michiel Haverans | (Belgium) No. 904 Red Ant Racing | 16 | 10 | 7 | 5 | 23† | | | 122 |
| 7 | (Switzerland) Antonio Garzon | (Switzerland) No. 917 Orchid Racing Team | 18 | | 12 | 18† | 5 | 12 | 13 | 14 |
| 8 | (Switzerland) Alexandre Mottet | (Switzerland) No. 963 Orchid Racing Team | 9 | | | | | | | 105 |
| 8 | (Switzerland) Alexandre Mottet | (Switzerland) No. 917 Orchid Racing Team | | 21 | 12 | 18† | 5 | 12 | 13 | 105 |
| 9 | (Switzerland) Jeremy Brodard | (Switzerland) No. 917 Orchid Racing Team | | | 12 | 18† | 5 | 12 | 13 | 93 |
| 10 | (France) Antoine Leclerc | (Switzerland) No. 963 Orchid Racing Team | | | 9 | 8 | | | | 76 |
| 10 | (France) Antoine Leclerc | (Switzerland) No. 917 Orchid Racing Team | | | | | | 12 | 13 | 76 |
| 10 | (Netherlands) Patrick Huisman | (Germany) No. 907 RPM Racing | | | 17 | 19 | | 11 | 10 | 76 |
| 11 | (Switzerland) Loic Villiger | (Switzerland) No. 963 Orchid Racing Team | 9 | | 9 | 8 | | | | 74 |
| 11 | (Switzerland) Linus Diener (Italy) Amadeo Pampanini (Switzerland) Nicolas Stürzinger | (Germany) No. 967 HRT Performance | 14 | 12 | Ret | Ret | 10 | | | 74 |
| 12 | (France) Stéphane Perrin | (France) No. 908 SebLajoux Racing by DUWO Racing | 20 | | | | | | | 70 |
| 12 | (France) Stéphane Perrin | (Denmark) No. 902 Holmgaard Motorsport | | 34 | 11 | 7 | | 32 | 26 | 70 |
| 12 | (Belgium) Gary Terclavers | (France) No. 908 SebLajoux Racing by DUWO Racing | | | 19 | 12 | | | | 70 |
| 12 | (Belgium) Gary Terclavers | (Germany) No. 967 HRT Performance | | | | | | 13 | 12 | 70 |
| 13 | (Germany) Kim André Hauschild | (Germany) No. 967 HRT Performance | | 12 | Ret | Ret | | 13 | 12 | 68 |
| 14 | (El Salvador) Rolando Saca | (Germany) No. 988 MRS-GT Racing | | 19 | | | 18† | 19 | 16 | 63 |
| 15 | (Netherlands) Lucas Van Eijndhoven | (Belgium) No. 903 Red Ant Racing | | | 4 | 4 | | | | 60 |
| 15 | (Belgium) Lars Zaenen | (Belgium) No. 903 Red Ant Racing | | | | | | **8** | **6** | 60 |
| 15 | (Denmark) Jonas Holmgaard (Denmark) Magnus Holmgaard (Denmark) Martin Vedel Mortensen | (Denmark) No. 902 Holmgaard Motorsport | | 34 | 11 | 7 | | 32 | 26 | 60 |
| 16 | (Qatar) Ibrahim Al-Abdulghani (Qatar) Abdulla Ali Al-Khelaifi (Qatar) Ghanim Ali Al Maadheed (Germany) Julian Hanses | (Qatar) No. 931 QMMF by HRT | | | | | | 9 | 8 | 54 |
| 17 | (Switzerland) Frank Villiger | (Switzerland) No. 917 Orchid Racing Team | 18 | | | | | | | 52 |
| 17 | (Switzerland) Frank Villiger | (Switzerland) No. 963 Orchid Racing Team | | | 9 | 8 | | | | 52 |
| 17 | (Belgium) Kris Cools | (Belgium) No. 904 Red Ant Racing | | | 7 | 5 | | | | 52 |
| 18 | (Netherlands) Ivo Breukers (Netherlands) Luc Breukers (Switzerland) Fabian Danz | (Netherlands) No. 909 Red Camel-Jordans.nl | Ret | Ret | **5** | **6** | DNS | | | 50 |
| 18 | (Netherlands) Rik Breukers | (Netherlands) No. 909 Red Camel-Jordans.nl | | Ret | **5** | **6** | DNS | | | 50 |
| 19 | (Switzerland) Daniel Gillioz | (Switzerland) No. 917 Orchid Racing Team | 18 | 21 | 12 | 18† | | | | 49 |
| 20 | (Lithuania) Mantas Janavicius | (Lithuania) No. 974 Rimo Adero by Ebimotors | 11 | | | | | | | 48 |
| 20 | (Lithuania) Mantas Janavicius | (Germany) No. 988 MRS-GT Racing | | | | | 18† | | | 48 |
| 21 | (Netherlands) Gijs Bessem (Netherlands) Harry Hilders | (Netherlands) No. 992 NKPP Racing by Bas Koeten Racing | 12 | 32 | | | | 22 | 31† | 46 |
| 22 | (Costa Rica) Amadeo Quiros (Estonia) Antti Rammo | (Germany) No. 988 MRS-GT Racing | | 19 | | | | 19 | 16 | 43 |
| 23 | (France) Gilles Blasco (France) Jean-François Demorge (France) Philippe Polette | (France) No. 908 SebLajoux Racing by DUWO Racing | 20 | 24 | | | 12† | | | 42 |
| 24 | (Lithuania) Julius Adomavičius | (Belgium) No. 903 Red Ant Racing | | **9** | | | | | | 40 |
| 24 | (Italy) Andrea Buratti (Italy) Corrado Costa (Italy) Enrico Fernando (United States) Eric Wagner | (Italy) No. 922 Fulgenzi Racing | | | | | 3 | | | 40 |
| 24 | (United Kingdom) Bradley Ellis (United Kingdom) David Holloway (Republic of Ireland) Jonathan Kearney | (Germany) No. 967 HRT Performance | | | | | | 13 | 12 | 40 |
| 25 | (France) Romain Dumas (France) Sébastien Loeb | (Switzerland) No. 963 Orchid Racing Team | 9 | | | | | | | 36 |
| 26 | (Italy) Max Busnelli (Switzerland) Ivan Jacoma (Switzerland) Valerio Presezzi | (Switzerland) No. 912 Centri Porsche Ticino | 10 | | | | | | | 32 |
| 26 | (Lithuania) Robertas Kupcikas (Lithuania) Domas Raudonis (Lithuania) Tautvydas Rudokas | (Lithuania) No. 993 Porsche Baltic | Ret | 11 | | | | | | 32 |
| 26 | (France) Benjamin Roy | (France) No. 908 SebLajoux Racing by DUWO Racing | | 24 | | | 12† | | | 32 |
| 27 | (France) Solenn Amrouche (France) Miguel Moiola (France) Eric Mouez (France) Lauris Nauroy | (France) No. 908 SebLajoux Racing by DUWO Racing | | | 19 | 12 | | | | 30 |
| 28 | (Costa Rica) Charlie Fonseca (Finland) Jukka Honkavuori | (Germany) No. 988 MRS-GT Racing | | | | | | 19 | 16 | 29 |
| 29 | (Netherlands) Bob Herber | (Netherlands) No. 925 Bas Koeten Racing | 19† | 17 | | | | | | 28 |
| 29 | (Netherlands) Bob Herber | (Netherlands) No. 992 NKPP by Bas Koeten Racing | | | | | | 22 | 31† | 28 |
| 29 | (Netherlands) Marcel van Berlo | (Netherlands) No. 925 Bas Koeten Racing | 19† | 17 | | | | | | 28 |
| 29 | (Lithuania) Marius Bartkus (Lithuania) Aurelijus Rusteika (Austria) Valters Zviedris | (Lithuania) No. 974 Rimo Adero by Ebimotors | 11 | | | | | | | 28 |
| 30 | (Netherlands) Mark van Eldik (Netherlands) Paul Meijer (Netherlands) Ralph Poppelaars (Netherlands) Edwin Schilt | (Netherlands) No. 972 Hans Weijs Motorsport | | 14 | | | | | | 24 |
| 30 | (Germany) Ben Bünnagel (Estonia) Martin Rump (United States) Bryan Sircely (Slovakia) Antal Zsigo | (Belgium) No. 918 Mühlner Motorsport | | | | | | 13 | 19 | 24 |
| 30 | (Belgium) Jef Machiels (United Kingdom) Gavin Pickering | (Belgium) No. 904 Red Ant Racing | | | | | | 14 | 30† | 24 |
| 31 | (Portugal) Ricardo Costa (United States) Will Langhorne (Germany) Marco Müller (Hong Kong) Shaun Thong (Hong Kong) Terence Tse | (Germany) No. 988 MRS-GT Racing | | | 19 | 16 | | | | 23 |
| 32 | (Canada) Michel Sallenbach | (Denmark) No. 902 Holmgaard Motorsport | | | | | | 32 | 26 | 22 |
| 33 | (Italy) Paolo Gnemmi (Italy) Gianluigi Piccioli (Italy) Paolo Venerosi | (Italy) No. 973 Ebimotors | 13 | | | | | | | 20 |
| 33 | (Switzerland) Silvain Pastoris | (Germany) No. 988 MRS-GT Racing | | | | | 18† | | | 20 |
| 33 | (Netherlands) Mark van der Aa | (Netherlands) No. 992 NKPP Racing by Bas Koeten Racing | | | | | | 22 | 31† | 20 |
| 34 | (Germany) Heiko Eichenberg (Switzerland) Patrik Grütter (Austria) Bernhard Wagner | (Germany) No. 927 SRS Team Sorg Rennsport | | 16 | | | | | | 18 |
| 35 | (France) Laurène Godey | (Switzerland) No. 917 Orchid Racing Team | 18 | | | | | | | 14 |
| 36 | (Belgium) Olivier Dons (Belgium) Wim Meulders (Belgium) Rik Renmans | (Belgium) No. 979 Speedlover | | 22 | | | | | | 10 |
| 37 | (South Korea) Roelof Bruins (Canada) Steven Cho (Hong Kong) Dr. Ma | (South Korea) No. 911 Hankook Competition | 23 | 35† | | | | | | 8 |
| 37 | (South Korea) Jongkyum Kim | (South Korea) No. 911 Hankook Competition | 23 | | | | | | | 8 |
| 38 | (United States) Dallas Carroll (United States) Matt Kehoe (United States) Mark Smith | (San Marino) No. 969 GDL Racing | | 28 | | | | | | 6 |
| 39 | (Austria) Felix Neuhofer (Austria) Markus Neuhofer (Germany) Manuel Zlof | (Austria) No. 985 Neuhofer Rennsport | Ret | 29 | | | | | | 4 |
| 40 | (Germany) Marlon Menden | (Denmark) No. 902 Holmgaard Motorsport | | 34 | | | | | | 0 |
| | (Switzerland) Stefano Monaco | (Germany) No. 967 HRT Performance | | | Ret | Ret | | | | 0 |
| | Alexey Denisov | (Austria) No. 985 Neuhofer Rennsport | Ret | | | | | | | 0 |
| | (Lithuania) Eduardas Klepikas | (Lithuania) No. 993 Porsche Baltic | Ret | | | | | | | 0 |
| | (Spain) Pablo Bras Silvero (Spain) Francesc Gutierrez Agüi (Spain) Fernando Gonzalez Gonzalez (Spain) Pedro Miguel Lourinho Bras (Spain) Agustin Sanabria Crespo | (Spain) No. 949 Road to Le Mans | | | | | | Ret | Ret | 0 |
| Pos. | Drivers | Team | (Italy) MUG | (Belgium) SPA | (Portugal) POR | | (Italy) MIS | (Spain) BAR | | Pts. |
| Pos. | Drivers | Team | (Italy) MUG | (Belgium) SPA | 12H | 24H | (Italy) MIS | 12H | 24H | Pts. |

† – Drivers did not finish the race, but were classified as they completed over 60% of the class winner's race distance.

==== 992 Teams' ====
| Pos. | Team | (Italy) MUG | (Belgium) SPA | (Portugal) POR | | (Italy) MIS | (Spain) BAR | | Pts. |
| Pos. | Team | (Italy) MUG | (Belgium) SPA | 12H | 24H | (Italy) MIS | 12H | 24H | Pts. |
|---|---|---|---|---|---|---|---|---|---|
| 1 | (Belgium) No. 903 Red Ant Racing | 6 | **9** | 4 | 4 | **Ret** | **8** | **6** | 200 |
| 2 | (Germany) No. 907 RPM Racing | **Ret** | 15 | 17 | 19 | 4 | 11 | 10 | 132 |
| 3 | (Belgium) No. 904 Red Ant Racing | 16 | 10 | 7 | 5 | 23† | 14 | 30† | 130 |
| 4 | (Germany) No. 967 HRT Performance | 14 | 12 | Ret | Ret | 10 | 13 | 12 | 114 |
| 5 | (Switzerland) No. 917 Orchid Racing Team | 18 | 21 | 12 | 18† | 5 | 12 | 13 | 107 |
| 6 | (Germany) No. 988 MRS-GT Racing | | 19 | 19 | 16 | 18† | 19 | 16 | 86 |
| 7 | (Switzerland) No. 963 Orchid Racing Team | 9 | | 9 | 8 | | | | 74 |
| 8 | (France) No. 908 SebLajoux Racing by DUWO Racing | 20 | 24 | 19 | 12 | 12† | | | 72 |
| 9 | (Denmark) No. 902 Holmgaard Motorsport | | 34 | 11 | 7 | | 32 | 26 | 60 |
| 10 | (Qatar) No. 931 QMMF by HRT | | | | | | 9 | 8 | 54 |
| 11 | (Netherlands) No. 909 Red Camel-Jordans.nl | Ret | Ret | **5** | **6** | DNS | | | 50 |
| 12 | (Netherlands) No. 992 NKPP Racing by Bas Koeten Racing | 12 | 32 | | | | 22 | 31† | 46 |
| 13 | (Italy) No. 922 Fulgenzi Racing | | | | | 3 | | | 40 |
| 14 | (Switzerland) No. 912 Centri Porsche Ticino | 10 | | | | | | | 32 |
| 14 | (Lithuania) No. 993 Porsche Baltic | Ret | 11 | | | | | | 32 |
| 15 | (Netherlands) No. 925 Bas Koeten Racing | 19† | 17 | | | | | | 28 |
| 15 | (Lithuania) No. 974 Rimo Adero by Ebimotors | 11 | | | | | | | 28 |
| 16 | (Belgium) No. 918 Mühlner Motorsport | | | | | | 13 | 19 | 24 |
| 16 | (Netherlands) No. 972 Hans Weijs Motorsport | | 14 | | | | | | 24 |
| 17 | (Italy) No. 973 Ebimotors | 13 | | | | | | | 20 |
| 18 | (Germany) No. 927 SRS Team Sorg Rennsport | | 16 | | | | | | 18 |
| 19 | (Belgium) No. 979 Speedlover | | 22 | | | | | | 10 |
| 20 | (South Korea) No. 911 Hankook Competition | 23 | 35† | | | | | | 8 |
| 21 | (San Marino) No. 969 GDL Racing | | 28 | | | | | | 6 |
| 22 | (Austria) No. 985 Neuhofer Rennsport | Ret | 29 | | | | | | 4 |
| | (Spain) No. 949 Road to Le Mans | | | | | | Ret | Ret | 0 |
| Pos. | Team | (Italy) MUG | (Belgium) SPA | (Portugal) POR | | (Italy) MIS | (Spain) BAR | | Pts. |
| Pos. | Team | (Italy) MUG | (Belgium) SPA | 12H | 24H | (Italy) MIS | 12H | 24H | Pts. |

† – Drivers did not finish the race, but were classified as they completed over 60% of the class winner's race distance.

==== 992-Am Drivers' ====
| Pos. | Drivers | Team | (Italy) MUG | (Belgium) SPA | (Portugal) POR | | (Italy) MIS | (Spain) BAR | | Pts. |
| Pos. | Drivers | Team | (Italy) MUG | (Belgium) SPA | 12H | 24H | (Italy) MIS | 12H | 24H | Pts. |
|---|---|---|---|---|---|---|---|---|---|---|
| 1 | (Germany) Philip Hamprecht (Sweden) Niclas Jönsson (United States) Tracy Krohn | (Germany) No. 907 RPM Racing | **Ret** | 32 | **17** | **9** | **4** | **10** | **11** | 178 |
| 2 | (Switzerland) Antonio Garzon | (Switzerland) No. 917 Orchid Racing Team | 18 | | 12 | 18† | 5 | 12 | 13 | 142 |
| 3 | (Switzerland) Alexandre Mottet | (Switzerland) No. 917 Orchid Racing Team | | 21 | 12 | 18† | 5 | 12 | 13 | 140 |
| 4 | (Switzerland) Jeremy Brodard | (Switzerland) No. 917 Orchid Racing Team | | | 12 | 18† | 5 | 12 | 13 | 122 |
| 5 | (Netherlands) Patrick Huisman | (Germany) No. 907 RPM Racing | | | **17** | **9** | | **10** | **11** | 110 |
| 6 | (Belgium) Gary Terclavers | (France) No. 908 SebLajoux Racing by DUWO Racing | | | 19 | 12 | | | | 102 |
| 6 | (Belgium) Gary Terclavers | (Germany) No. 967 HRT Performance | | | | | | 13 | 12 | 102 |
| 7 | (France) Laurent Misbach | (Switzerland) No. 917 Orchid Racing Team | | 21 | | | 5 | 12 | 13 | 94 |
| 8 | (Switzerland) Linus Diener (Italy) Amadeo Pampanini (Switzerland) Nicolas Stürzinger | (Germany) No. 967 HRT Performance | 14 | 12 | | | 10 | | | 92 |
| 9 | (Germany) Kim André Hauschild | (Germany) No. 967 HRT Performance | | 12 | | | | 13 | 12 | 86 |
| 10 | (Switzerland) Daniel Gillioz | (Switzerland) No. 917 Orchid Racing Team | 18 | 21 | 12 | 18† | | | | 84 |
| 11 | (El Salvador) Rolando Saca | (Germany) No. 988 MRS-GT Racing | | 19 | | | 18† | 19 | 16 | 76 |
| 12 | (Netherlands) Bob Herber | (Netherlands) No. 925 Bas Koeten Racing | 19† | 17 | | | | | | 70 |
| 12 | (Netherlands) Bob Herber | (Netherlands) No. 992 NKPP by Bas Koeten Racing | | | | | | 22 | 31† | 70 |
| 13 | (Netherlands) Gijs Bessem (Netherlands) Harry Hilders | (Netherlands) No. 992 NKPP Racing by Bas Koeten Racing | 12 | 13 | | | | 22 | 31† | 68 |
| 14 | (Qatar) Ibrahim Al-Abdulghani (Qatar) Abdulla Ali Al-Khelaifi (Qatar) Ghanim Ali Al Maadheed (Germany) Julian Hanses | (Qatar) No. 931 QMMF by HRT | | | | | | 9 | 8 | 60 |
| 15 | (France) Solenn Amrouche (France) Miguel Moiola (France) Eric Mouez (France) Lauris Nauroy | (France) No. 908 SebLajoux Racing by DUWO Racing | | | 19 | 12 | | | | 56 |
| 15 | (Costa Rica) Amadeo Quiros (Estonia) Antti Rammo | (Germany) No. 988 MRS-GT Racing | | 19 | | | | 19 | 16 | 56 |
| 15 | (Lithuania) Mantas Janavicius | (Lithuania) No. 974 Rimo Adero by Ebimotors | 11 | | | | | | | 56 |
| 15 | (Lithuania) Mantas Janavicius | (Germany) No. 988 MRS-GT Racing | | | | | 18† | | | 56 |
| 16 | (France) Gilles Blasco (France) Jean-François Demorge (France) Philippe Polette | (France) No. 908 SebLajoux Racing by DUWO Racing | 20 | 24 | | | 12† | | | 42 |
| 17 | (United Kingdom) Bradley Ellis (United Kingdom) David Holloway (Republic of Ireland) Jonathan Kearney | (Germany) No. 967 HRT Performance | | | | | | 13 | 12 | 46 |
| 17 | (Portugal) Ricardo Costa (United States) Will Langhorne (Germany) Marco Müller (Hong Kong) Shaun Thong (Hong Kong) Terence Tse | (Germany) No. 988 MRS-GT Racing | | | 19 | 16 | | | | 46 |
| 18 | (France) Antoine Leclerc | (Switzerland) No. 917 Orchid Racing Team | | | | | | 12 | 13 | 44 |
| 20 | (Netherlands) Marcel van Berlo | (Netherlands) No. 925 Bas Koeten Racing | 19† | 17 | | | | | | 42 |
| 20 | (Italy) Max Busnelli (Italy) Francesco Fenici (Switzerland) Ivan Jacoma (Switzerland) Valerio Presezzi | (Switzerland) No. 912 Centri Porsche Ticino | 10 | | | | | | | 40 |
| 20 | (Italy) Andrea Buratti (Italy) Corrado Costa (Italy) Enrico Fernando (United States) Eric Wagner | (Italy) No. 922 Fulgenzi Racing | | | | | 3 | | | 40 |
| 21 | (France) Benjamin Roy | (France) No. 908 SebLajoux Racing by DUWO Racing | | 24 | | | 12† | | | 38 |
| 22 | (Costa Rica) Charlie Fonseca (Finland) Jukka Honkavuori | (Germany) No. 988 MRS-GT Racing | | | | | | 19 | 16 | 36 |
| 22 | (Lithuania) Marius Bartkus (Lithuania) Aurelijus Rusteika (Austria) Valters Zviedris | (Lithuania) No. 974 Rimo Adero by Ebimotors | 11 | | | | | | | 36 |
| 22 | (Netherlands) Mark van Eldik (Netherlands) Paul Meijer (Netherlands) Ralph Poppelaars (Netherlands) Edwin Schilt | (Netherlands) No. 972 Hans Weijs Motorsport | | 14 | | | | | | 36 |
| 23 | (Germany) Ben Bünnagel (Estonia) Martin Rump (United States) Bryan Sircely (Slovakia) Antal Zsigo | (Belgium) No. 918 Mühlner Motorsport | | | | | | 13 | 19 | 29 |
| 24 | (Germany) Heiko Eichenberg (Switzerland) Patrik Grütter (Austria) Bernhard Wagner | (Germany) No. 927 SRS Team Sorg Rennsport | | 16 | | | | | | 28 |
| 24 | (Italy) Paolo Gnemmi (Italy) Gianluigi Piccioli (Italy) Paolo Venerosi | (Italy) No. 973 Ebimotors | 13 | | | | | | | 28 |
| 24 | (Netherlands) Mark van der Aa | (Netherlands) No. 992 NKPP Racing by Bas Koeten Racing | | | | | | 22 | 31† | 28 |
| 25 | (South Korea) Roelof Bruins (Canada) Steven Cho (Hong Kong) Dr. Ma | (South Korea) No. 911 Hankook Competition | 23 | 35† | | | | | | 20 |
| 25 | (France) Laurène Godey (France) Frank Villiger | (Switzerland) No. 917 Orchid Racing Team | 18 | | | | | | | 20 |
| 25 | (Switzerland) Silvain Pastoris | (Germany) No. 988 MRS-GT Racing | | | | | 18† | | | 20 |
| 26 | (Belgium) Olivier Dons (Belgium) Wim Meulders (Belgium) Rik Renmans | (Belgium) No. 979 Speedlover | | 22 | | | | | | 16 |
| 26 | (France) Stéphane Perrin | (France) No. 908 SebLajoux Racing by DUWO Racing | 20 | | | | | | | 16 |
| 27 | (South Korea) Jongkyum Kim | (South Korea) No. 911 Hankook Competition | 23 | | | | | | | 14 |
| 28 | (United States) Dallas Carroll (United States) Matt Kehoe (United States) Mark Smith | (San Marino) No. 969 GDL Racing | | 28 | | | | | | 12 |
| 29 | (Austria) Felix Neuhofer (Austria) Markus Neuhofer (Germany) Manuel Zlof | (Austria) No. 985 Neuhofer Rennsport | Ret | **29** | | | | | | 10 |
| | (Lithuania) Eduardas Klepikas (Lithuania) Robertas Kupcikas (Lithuania) Domas Raudonis (Lithuania) Tautvydas Rudokas | (Lithuania) No. 993 Porsche Baltic | Ret | | | | | | | 0 |
| | Alexey Denisov | (Austria) No. 985 Neuhofer Rennsport | Ret | | | | | | | 0 |
| | (Spain) Pablo Bras Silvero (Spain) Francesc Gutierrez Agüi (Spain) Fernando Gonzalez Gonzalez (Spain) Pedro Miguel Lourinho Bras (Spain) Agustin Sanabria Crespo | (Spain) No. 949 Road to Le Mans | | | | | | Ret | Ret | 0 |
| Pos. | Drivers | Team | (Italy) MUG | (Belgium) SPA | (Portugal) POR | | (Italy) MIS | (Spain) BAR | | Pts. |
| Pos. | Drivers | Team | (Italy) MUG | (Belgium) SPA | 12H | 24H | (Italy) MIS | 12H | 24H | Pts. |

† – Drivers did not finish the race, but were classified as they completed over 60% of the class winner's race distance.

==== 992-Am Teams' ====
| Pos. | Team | (Italy) MUG | (Belgium) SPA | (Portugal) POR | | (Italy) MIS | (Spain) BAR | | Pts. |
| Pos. | Team | (Italy) MUG | (Belgium) SPA | 12H | 24H | (Italy) MIS | 12H | 24H | Pts. |
|---|---|---|---|---|---|---|---|---|---|
| 1 | (Germany) No. 967 HRT Performance | 14 | 12 | | | | | | 64 |
| 2 | (Netherlands) No. 925 Bas Koeten Racing | 19† | 17 | | | | | | 42 |
| 3 | (Switzerland) No. 912 Centri Porsche Ticino | 10 | | | | | | | 40 |
| 3 | (Netherlands) No. 992 NKPP Racing by Bas Koeten Racing | 12 | 13 | | | | | | 40 |
| 4 | (Switzerland) No. 917 Orchid Racing Team | 18 | 21 | | | | | | 38 |
| 5 | (Lithuania) No. 974 Rimo Adero by Ebimotors | 11 | | | | | | | 36 |
| 5 | (Netherlands) No. 972 Hans Weijs Motorsport | | 14 | | | | | | 36 |
| 6 | (Germany) No. 907 Krohn Racing | **Ret** | 32 | | | | | | 32 |
| 7 | (France) No. 908 SebLajoux Racing by DUWO Racing | 20 | 24 | | | | | | 30 |
| 8 | (Italy) No. 973 Ebimotors | 13 | | | | | | | 28 |
| 8 | (Germany) No. 927 SRS Team Sorg Rennsport | | 16 | | | | | | 28 |
| 9 | (South Korea) No. 911 Hankook Competition | 23 | 35† | | | | | | 20 |
| 9 | (Germany) No. 988 MRS-GT Racing | | 19 | | | | | | 20 |
| 10 | (Belgium) No. 979 Speedlover | | 22 | | | | | | 16 |
| 11 | (San Marino) No. 969 GDL Racing | | 28 | | | | | | 12 |
| 12 | (Austria) No. 985 Neuhofer Rennsport | Ret | **29** | | | | | | 10 |
| | (Lithuania) No. 993 Porsche Baltic | Ret | | | | | | | 0 |
| Pos. | Team | (Italy) MUG | (Belgium) SPA | (Portugal) POR | | (Italy) MIS | (Spain) BAR | | Pts. |
| Pos. | Team | (Italy) MUG | (Belgium) SPA | 12H | 24H | (Italy) MIS | 12H | 24H | Pts. |

† – Drivers did not finish the race, but were classified as they completed over 60% of the class winner's race distance.

==== GT4 Drivers' ====
| Pos. | Drivers | Team | (Italy) MUG | (Belgium) SPA | (Portugal) POR | | (Italy) MIS | (Spain) BAR | | Pts. |
| Pos. | Drivers | Team | (Italy) MUG | (Belgium) SPA | 12H | 24H | (Italy) MIS | 12H | 24H | Pts. |
|---|---|---|---|---|---|---|---|---|---|---|
| 1 | (Seychelles) Aliyyah Koloc (Czech Republic) Adam Lacko (Czech Republic) David Vrsecky | (United Arab Emirates) No. 416 Buggyra ZM Racing | 22 | 23 | 14 | 10 | 7 | | | 178 |
| 2 | (Germany) Dennis Bohn (United States) José Garcia (Germany) Patrick Kolb | (Germany) No. 424 Lionspeed GP | **24** | 25 | Ret | Ret | 19 | 17 | 17 | 158 |
| 3 | (United States) Daniel Miller | (Germany) No. 424 Lionspeed GP | **24** | 25 | | | | 17 | 17 | 122 |
| 4 | (Lithuania) Egidijus Gelūnas (Lithuania) Aras Kvedaras (Lithuania) Rokas Kvedaras (Lithuania) Mindaugas Liatukas | (Lithuania) No. 405 GSR Motorsport | | | **15** | **14** | | **25** | **21** | 84 |
| 5 | (Czech Republic) Jaroslav Janiš | (United Arab Emirates) No. 416 Buggyra ZM Racing | | | 14 | 10 | | | | 80 |
| 6 | (France) Thierry Chkondali (Switzerland) Caryl Fritsché (France) Marc Girard (France) Thomas Leal (Canada) Michel Sallenbach | (France) No. 491 W Autosport | | | 13 | 11 | | | | 56 |
| 6 | (United Kingdom) Matthew George (United Kingdom) Owen Hizzey (United Kingdom) Christopher Jones (United Kingdom) Neville Jones | (United Kingdom) No. 421 Venture Engineering | | | | | | 18 | 14 | 56 |
| 7 | (Belgium) Fabian Duffieux (United Kingdom) Pippa Mann (United States) Jon Miller (Canada) Samantha Tan (United States) Neil Verhagen | (Canada) No. 428 ST Racing | | | | | | 20 | 15 | 50 |
| 8 | (Lithuania) Ernesta Globytė | (Lithuania) No. 405 GSR Motorsport | | | **15** | **14** | | | | 48 |
| 9 | (Slovenia) Mihael Ambroz (United Kingdom) Peter Matic (Serbia) Miloš Pavlović (Italy) Alessio Ruffini | (Slovenia) No. 414 Apex MP Racing | | | | | | 15 | 23 | 40 |
| 9 | (Spain) Guillermo Aso (United States) Keith Gatehouse (Switzerland) Maximilien Huber (Spain) Manel Lao Cornago; Igor Sorokin | (Spain) No. 415 NM Racing Team | | | | | | 21 | 18 | 40 |
| 10 | (Lithuania) Dovydas Ketvirtis | (Lithuania) No. 405 GSR Motorsport | | | | | | **25** | **21** | 34 |
| 11 | (Switzerland) Martin Kroll (Germany) Michael Mayer (Germany) Rainer Partl | (Switzerland) No. 431 Hofor Racing by Bonk Motorsport | 27 | | | | | | | 32 |
| 11 | (Belgium) Kris Verhoeven (Belgium) Mark Verhoeven (Belgium) Rob Verhoeven | (Belgium) No. 419 Hamofa Motorsport | | 27 | | | Ret | | | 32 |
| 11 | (Switzerland) Pascal Bachmann (France) Julien Darras (France) Jahid Fazal Karim | (Belgium) No. 407 Street Art Racing | | | | | **22**† | | | 32 |
| 12 | (Sweden) Erik Behrens (Sweden) Daniel Roos | (Sweden) No. 400 ALFAB Racing | | 37 | | | | | | 28 |
| 13 | (Netherlands) Jeroen Bleekemolen (Netherlands) Jan Lammers (South Africa) Greg Mills (Italy) Cristoforo Pirro (Italy) Emanuele Pirro | (South Africa) No. 455 Team Africa Le Mans | | | | | | 28 | 32 | 27 |
| 14 | (United Kingdom) Ravi Ramyead (United Kingdom) Charlie Robertson (Cyprus) Vasily Vladykin | (United Kingdom) No. 438 Simpson Motorsport | | **40** | | | | | | 24 |
| | (Spain) Harriet Arruabarrena (Spain) Vincente Dasi (Spain) Josep Parera | (United Arab Emirates) No. 418 PCR Sport | Ret | | | | | | | 0 |
| | (Switzerland) Patric Niederhauser | (Germany) No. 424 Lionspeed GP | | | Ret | Ret | | | | 0 |
| Pos. | Drivers | Team | (Italy) MUG | (Belgium) SPA | (Portugal) POR | | (Italy) MIS | (Spain) BAR | | Pts. |
| Pos. | Drivers | Team | (Italy) MUG | (Belgium) SPA | 12H | 24H | (Italy) MIS | 12H | 24H | Pts. |

† – Drivers did not finish the race, but were classified as they completed over 60% of the class winner's race distance.

==== GT4 Teams' ====
| Pos. | Team | Car | (Italy) MUG | (Belgium) SPA | (Portugal) POR | | (Italy) MIS | (Spain) BAR | | Pts. |
| Pos. | Team | Car | (Italy) MUG | (Belgium) SPA | 12H | 24H | (Italy) MIS | 12H | 24H | Pts. |
|---|---|---|---|---|---|---|---|---|---|---|
| 1 | (United Arab Emirates) No. 416 Buggyra ZM Racing | Mercedes-AMG GT4 | 22 | 23 | 14 | 10 | 7 | | | 178 |
| 2 | (Germany) No. 424 Lionspeed GP | Porsche 718 Cayman GT4 RS Clubsport | **24** | 25 | Ret | Ret | 19 | 17 | 17 | 158 |
| 3 | (Lithuania) No. 405 GSR Motorsport | Ginetta G56 GT4 | | | **15** | **14** | | **25** | **21** | 84 |
| 4 | (France) No. 491 W Autosport | Toyota GR Supra GT4 | | | 13 | 11 | | | | 56 |
| 4 | (United Kingdom) No. 421 Venture Engineering | Mercedes-AMG GT4 | | | | | | 18 | 14 | 56 |
| 5 | (Canada) No. 428 ST Racing | BMW M4 GT4 Gen II | | | | | | 20 | 15 | 40 |
| 6 | (Slovenia) No. 414 Apex MP Racing | KTM X-Bow GT4 | | | | | | 15 | 23 | 40 |
| 6 | (Spain) No. 415 NM Racing Team | Mercedes-AMG GT4 | | | | | | 21 | 18 | 40 |
| 7 | (Switzerland) No. 431 Hofor Racing by Bonk Motorsport | BMW M4 GT4 Gen II | 27 | | | | | | | 32 |
| 7 | (Belgium) No. 419 Hamofa Motorsport | BMW M4 GT4 Gen II | | 27 | | | Ret | | | 32 |
| 7 | (Belgium) No. 407 Street Art Racing | Aston Martin Vantage AMR GT4 | | | | | **22**† | | | 32 |
| 8 | (Sweden) No. 400 ALFAB Racing | McLaren Artura GT4 | | 37 | | | | | | 28 |
| 9 | (South Africa) No. 455 Team Africa Le Mans | Ginetta G55 GT4 | | | | | | 28 | 32 | 27 |
| 10 | (United Kingdom) No. 438 Simpson Motorsport | BMW M4 GT4 Gen II | | **40** | | | | | | 24 |
| | (United Arab Emirates) No. 418 PCR Sport | Mercedes-AMG GT4 | Ret | | | | | | | 0 |
| Pos. | Team | Car | (Italy) MUG | (Belgium) SPA | (Portugal) POR | | (Italy) MIS | (Spain) BAR | | Pts. |
| Pos. | Team | Car | (Italy) MUG | (Belgium) SPA | 12H | 24H | (Italy) MIS | 12H | 24H | Pts. |

† – Drivers did not finish the race, but were classified as they completed over 60% of the class winner's race distance.

==== TCX Drivers' ====
| Pos. | Drivers | Team | (Italy) MUG | (Belgium) SPA | (Portugal) POR | | (Italy) MIS | (Spain) BAR | | Pts. |
| Pos. | Drivers | Team | (Italy) MUG | (Belgium) SPA | 12H | 24H | (Italy) MIS | 12H | 24H | Pts. |
|---|---|---|---|---|---|---|---|---|---|---|
| 1 | (United Kingdom) Daniel Morris (United Kingdom) Colin White | (United Kingdom) No. 178 CWS Engineering | | **30** | | | | | | 40 |
| 2 | (Germany) Henning Eschweiler (Germany) Christoph Krombach (Germany) Heinz Jürgen Kroner (Mexico) Benito Tagle | (Germany) No. 127 SRS Team Sorg Rennsport | | 31 | | | | | | 36 |
| 3 | (Belgium) "Brody" (Italy) Bruno Barbaro (Belgium) Jacques Derenne (France) Brice Pineau | (Belgium) No. 169 HY Racing | | 39 | | | | | | 32 |
| Pos. | Drivers | Team | (Italy) MUG | (Belgium) SPA | (Portugal) POR | | (Italy) MIS | (Spain) BAR | | Pts. |
| Pos. | Drivers | Team | (Italy) MUG | (Belgium) SPA | 12H | 24H | (Italy) MIS | 12H | 24H | Pts. |

† – Drivers did not finish the race, but were classified as they completed over 60% of the class winner's race distance.

==== TCX Teams' ====
| Pos. | Team | Car | (Italy) MUG | (Belgium) SPA | (Portugal) POR | | (Italy) MIS | (Spain) BAR | | Pts. |
| Pos. | Team | Car | (Italy) MUG | (Belgium) SPA | 12H | 24H | (Italy) MIS | 12H | 24H | Pts. |
|---|---|---|---|---|---|---|---|---|---|---|
| 1 | (Germany) No. 127 SRS Team Sorg Rennsport | Porsche 718 Cayman GT4 Clubsport | | 31 | | | | 23 | 20 | 96 |
| 2 | (United Kingdom) No. 178 CWS Engineering | Ginetta G55 Supercup | | **30** | | | **15** | 34† | Ret | 90 |
| 3 | (France) No. 125 PR-V | Peugeot 308 Racing Cup | | | **16** | **13** | | | | 40 |
| 4 | (United Kingdom) No. 133 J-Mec Engineering | BMW M3 E46 | | | | | | **27** | **24** | 54 |
| 5 | (Germany) No. 101 asBest Racing | SEAT León Cup Racer | | | | | | 30 | 27 | 48 |
| 6 | (Germany) No. 111 SR Motorsport | Porsche 718 Cayman GT4 Clubsport | | | | | 11 | | | 40 |
| 7 | (Belgium) No. 169 HY Racing | Porsche Cayman GTS | | 39 | | | | | | 32 |
| Pos. | Team | Car | (Italy) MUG | (Belgium) SPA | (Portugal) POR | | (Italy) MIS | (Spain) BAR | | Pts. |
| Pos. | Team | Car | (Italy) MUG | (Belgium) SPA | 12H | 24H | (Italy) MIS | 12H | 24H | Pts. |

† – Drivers did not finish the race, but were classified as they completed over 60% of the class winner's race distance.
