= Ghanim Al-Maadheed =

Qatari racing driver (born 1993)

- Nationality: (Qatar) Qatari
- Born: Ghanim Salah Ali Al-Maadheed; 1993 (age 32–33) Doha, Qatar

GT World Challenge Europe career
- Debut season: 2025
- Current team: QMMF by Saintéloc Racing
- Categorisation: FIA Silver
- Car number: 27
- Starts: 4 (4 entries)
- Wins: 0
- Podiums: 0
- Poles: 0
- Fastest laps: 0

Previous series
- 2025 2025 2024–25 2024: Middle East Trophy; Porsche Carrera Cup Middle East; Asian Le Mans Series; 24H Series

Championship titles
- 2025: Middle East Trophy

Ghanim Salah Ali Al-Maadheed (born 1993 in Doha) is a Qatari racing driver who last competed in the 2025 GT World Challenge Europe for QMMF by Saintéloc Racing.

== Career ==
=== 24H Series ===
Al-Maadheed's professional racing debut came towards the end of the 2024 24H Series, where he joined HRT Performance to compete in the 24 Hours of Barcelona. He would be joined by fellow Qataris Ibrahim Al-Abdulghani and Abdulla Al-Khelaifi, as well as German driver Julian Hanses to drive the No. 931 Porsche 992 GT3 Cup. During the 24 Hour races, points are awarded at the 12-Hour mark in the race to all teams. Al-Maadheed and HRT were leading the race at the 12-Hour mark. They would go on to win the race. This was significant for Al-Maadheed, as it was his first win in any professional series and he had won in his debut.

=== 992 Endurance Cup ===
Following his win in the 24 Hours of Barcelona, Al-Maadheed entered the inaugural 992 Endurance Cup held at Circuit de Spa-Francorchamps. He would once again be joined by Al-Abdulghani, Al-Khelaifi, and Hanses to drive the No. 31 Porsche 992 GT3 Cup for HRT Performance in the Amateur class. They would qualify fourth in their class. During the course of the 12 hour race, the team slowly made their way up the order and eventually into the class lead. They would hold onto the lead to win the race.

=== Gulf 12 Hours ===
Al-Maadheed joined 2024 Gulf 12 Hours, in which he was driving the No. 91 Porsche 992 GT3 Cup for QMMF by HRT Performance in the 992 Cup class. Al-Abdulghani, Al-Khelaifi, and Hanses would join Al-Maadheed in the No. 91. After qualifying on pole, they would go on to win the race in the 992 Cup class.

=== Asian Le Mans Series ===
==== 2024–25 ====
Halfway through the 2024–25 Asian Le Mans Series, Al-Maadheed signed with Herberth Motorsport to drive in rounds three through six of the championship. The No. 46 Porsche 911 GT3 R (992) consisted of an all Qatari lineup of Al-Maadheed, Ibrahim Al-Abdulghani, and Abdulla Al-Khelaifi. The team was ineligible to score points, however, they would have a lackluster run of races with a best finish of 17th. Al-Maadheed and the team later withdrew from the final race of the season at Yas Marina.

=== Porsche Carrera Cup Middle East ===
Al-Maadheed joined midway into the 2025 Porsche Carrera Cup Middle East at Lusail International Circuit driving in the Amateur class in an entry supported by the Qatar Motor & Motorcycle Federation. He scored points in both races and finished eighth in the championship.

=== Middle East Trophy ===
In early 2025, Al-Maadheed joined the 2025 Middle East Trophy driving the No. 974 HRT Performance Porsche 992 GT3 Cup car in the Amateur class. He would once again be joined by fellow countrymen Al-Abdulghani and Al-Khelaifi as well as German driver Julian Hanses. They would have a dominant performance, winning both the Dubai 24 Hour and the 6 Hours of Abu Dhabi.

=== GT World Challenge Europe ===
==== 2025 ====
For his main campaign, Al-Maadheed moved over to Europe and signed with Saintéloc Racing to drive their No. 27 Audi R8 LMS Evo II in the 2025 GT World Challenge Europe. Since Al-Abdulghani has a Bronze rated FIA Driver License, the team competed in the Bronze class of the championship. For the sprint cup races in the championship, Al-Maadheed would drive alongside Ibrahim Al-Abdulghani, while Abdulla Ali Al-Khelaifi and Julian Hanses would join them for the endurance cup races. At Monza, Al-Maadheed would score their best result of the season of fifth thus far.

== Racing record ==
=== Career summary ===
Season	Series	Team	Races	Wins	Poles	F/Laps	Podiums	Points	Position
2024	24H Series - 992 Am	QMMF by HRT	2	2	0	0	2	60	14th
2024	992 Endurance Cup - Am	QMMF by HRT	1	0	0	0	1	0	**1st**
2024	Gulf 12 Hours - 992 Cup	QMMF by HRT Performance	1	0	1	0	1	0	**1st**
2024	FIA Motorsport Games GT Cup	QMMF by HRT Performance	1	0	0	0	0	N/A	10th
2024–25	Asian Le Mans Series - GT	QMMF by Herberth	3	0	0	0	0	0	NC
2024–25	Porsche Carrera Cup Middle East	QMMF by HRT Performance	2	0	0	0	0	18	18th
2025	Middle East Trophy - 992	QMMF by HRT	2	2	1	0	2	80	**1st**
2025	GT World Challenge Europe Endurance Cup	QMMF by Saintéloc Racing	5	0	0	0	0	0	NC
2025	GT World Challenge Europe Sprint Cup	QMMF by Saintéloc Racing	6	0	0	0	0	0	NC
2025–26	Asian Le Mans Series - GT	QMMF by GetSpeed							

* Season still in progress.

=== Complete 24H Series results ===
(key) (Races in bold indicate pole position) (Races in italics indicate fastest lap)

Year	Team	Class	Make	Engine	1	2	3	4	5	6	7	Pos.	Points
2024	QMMF by HRT	992-Am	Porsche 992 GT3 Cup	Porsche 4.0 L Flat-6	MUG	SPA	ALG; 12HR	ALG; 24HR	MIS	CAT; 12HR; 1	CAT; 24HR; 1	14th	60

=== Complete Asian Le Mans Series results ===
(key) (Races in bold indicate pole position; results in italics indicate fastest lap)

Year	Entrant	Class	Chassis	Engine	1	2	3	4	5	6	Rank	Points
2024–25	QMMF by Herberth	GT	Porsche 911 GT3 R (992)	Porsche M97/80 4.2 L Flat-6	SEP; 1	SEP; 2	DUB; 1; 17	DUB; 2; 22	ABU; 1 Ret	ABU; 2 WD	NC	0
2025–26	QMMF by GetSpeed	GT	Mercedes-AMG GT3 Evo	Mercedes-AMG M159 6.2 L V8	SEP; 1; 19	SEP; 2; 10	**DUB**; **1**; 4	**DUB**; **2** Ret	ABU; 1; 5	ABU; 2; 16	13th	27

=== Complete Porsche Carrera Cup Middle East results ===
(key) (Races in bold indicate pole position) (Races in italics indicate fastest lap)

Year	Team	Class	1	2	3	4	5	6	7	8	9	10	11	12	Pos.	Points
2025	QMMF	Pro/Am	BHR1; 1	BHR1; 2	QAT; 1; 4	QAT; 2; 4	DUB; 1	DUB; 2	YAS; 1	YAS; 2	BHR2; 1	BHR2; 2	JED; 1	JED; 2	7th	28

=== Complete Middle East Trophy results ===
(key) (Races in bold indicate pole position) (Races in italics indicate fastest lap)

Year	Team	Class	Make	Engine	1	2	Pos.	Points
2025	QMMF by HRT	Am	Porsche 992 GT3 Cup	Porsche 4.0 L Flat-6	DUB; 1	**YAS**; 1	1st	80

=== Complete GT World Challenge Europe results ===
==== GT World Challenge Europe Endurance Cup ====
(key) (Races in bold indicate pole position) (Races in italics indicate fastest lap)

Year	Team	Car	Class	1	2	3	4	5	6	7	Pos.	Points
2025	QMMF by Saintéloc Racing	Audi R8 LMS Evo II	Bronze	LEC; 47	MNZ; 23	SPA; 6H; 65	SPA; 12H; 58	SPA; 24H; 46	NÜR; 44	CAT; 28	22nd	18

==== GT World Challenge Europe Sprint Cup ====
(key) (Races in bold indicate pole position) (Races in italics indicate fastest lap)

Year	Team	Car	Class	1	2	3	4	5	6	7	8	Pos.	Points
2025	QMMF by Saintéloc Racing	Audi R8 LMS Evo II	Bronze	ZAN; 1; 31	ZAN; 2; 39	MIS; 1; 34	MIS; 2; 36	MAG; 1; 35	MAG; 2; 35	VAL; 1	VAL; 2	20th	5
