= Abdulla Al-Khelaifi =

Qatari racing driver (born 1990)

- Al-Khelaifi at Silverstone Circuit in 2026
- Nationality: (Qatar) Qatari
- Born: Abdulla Ali Al-Khelaifi; 8 May 1990 (age 36) Doha, Qatar

European Le Mans Series career
- Debut season: 2026
- Current team: Team Qatar by Iron Lynx
- Categorisation: FIA Bronze
- Car number: 62
- Starts: 5
- Wins: 1
- Podiums: 3
- Poles: 3
- Fastest laps: 0
- Best finish: TBD in 2026

Previous series
- 2025 2025 2025 2024–25 2024: GT World Challenge Europe; Middle East Trophy; Porsche Carrera Cup Middle East; Asian Le Mans Series; 24H Series

Championship titles
- 2025: Middle East Trophy

Abdulla Ali Al-Khelaifi (born 8 May 1990 in Doha) is a Qatari racing driver who competes in the European Le Mans Series with Team Qatar by Iron Lynx. He previously competed in the 2025 GT World Challenge Europe Endurance Cup with QMMF by Saintéloc Racing.

== Career ==
=== 24H Series ===
Following a four year hiatus from racing, Al-Khelaifi joined the 2024 24H Series, where he signed with HRT Performance to compete in the 24 Hours of Barcelona. He would be joined by fellow Qataris Ibrahim Al-Abdulghani and Ghanim Al-Maadheed, as well as German driver Julian Hanses to drive the No. 931 Porsche 992 GT3 Cup. During the 24 Hour races, points are awarded at the 12-Hour mark in the race to all teams. Al-Khelaifi and HRT were leading the race at the 12-Hour mark. They would go on to win the race.

=== 992 Endurance Cup ===
Following his win in the 24 Hours of Barcelona, Al-Khelaifi entered the inaugural 992 Endurance Cup held at Circuit de Spa-Francorchamps. He would once again be joined by Al-Abdulghani, Al-Maadheed, and Hanses to drive the No. 31 Porsche 992 GT3 Cup for HRT Performance in the Amateur class. They would qualify fourth in their class. During the course of the 12 hour race, the team slowly made their way up the order and eventually into the class lead. They would hold onto the lead to win the race.

=== Gulf 12 Hours ===
Al-Khelaifi joined 2024 Gulf 12 Hours, in which he was driving the No. 91 Porsche 992 GT3 Cup for QMMF by HRT Performance in the 992 Cup class. Al-Abdulghani, Al-Maadheed, and Hanses would join Al-Khelaifi in the No. 91. After qualifying on pole, they would go on to win the race in the 992 Cup class.

=== Asian Le Mans Series ===
==== 2024–25 ====
Halfway through the 2024–25 Asian Le Mans Series, Al-Khelaifi signed with Herberth Motorsport to drive in rounds three through six of the championship. The No. 46 Porsche 911 GT3 R (992) consisted of an all Qatari lineup of Al-Khelaifi, Ibrahim Al-Abdulghani and Ghanim Al-Maadheed. The team was ineligible to score points, however, they would have a lackluster run of races with a best finish of 17th. Al-Khelaifi and the team later withdrew from the final race of the season at Yas Marina.

=== Porsche Carrera Cup Middle East ===
Al-Khelaifi joined midway into the 2025 Porsche Carrera Cup Middle East at Lusail International Circuit driving in the Pro/Am class in an entry supported by the Qatar Motor & Motorcycle Federation. He qualified on pole for the first race, however, he would be beaten by Mohammed Bin Saud Al-Saud and finish second. In race two, he would break through to get his maiden win in the championship.

=== Middle East Trophy ===
In early 2025, Al-Khelaifi joined the 2025 Middle East Trophy driving the No. 974 HRT Performance Porsche 992 GT3 Cup car in the Amateur class. He would once again be joined by fellow countrymen Al-Abdulghani and Al-Maadheed as well as German driver Julian Hanses. They would have a dominant performance, winning both the Dubai 24 Hour and the 6 Hours of Abu Dhabi.

=== GT World Challenge Europe ===
==== 2025 ====
For his main campaign, Al-Khelaifi moved over to Europe and signed with Saintéloc Racing to drive their No. 27 Audi R8 LMS Evo II in the 2025 GT World Challenge Europe Endurance Cup. Since Al-Khelaifi has a Bronze rated FIA Driver License, he competed in the Bronze class of the championship. He would join Ibrahim Al-Abdulghani, Ghanim Al-Maadheed, and Julian Hanses in the endurance cup rounds. At Monza, Al-Khelaifi would score their best result of the season of fifth thus far.

== Personal life ==
Al-Khelaifi has been a Senior Pipeline Engineer at Qatar Petroleum since 2014.

== Racing record ==
=== Career summary ===
Season	Series	Team	Races	Wins	Poles	F/Laps	Podiums	Points	Position
2015	Toyota Racing Development 86 Cup	N/A	8	0	0	0	1	68	8th
2019	TCR Europe Touring Car Series	QMMF Racing by PCR Sport	12	0	0	0	0	0	38th
2019	Trofeo de España TCR	QMMF Racing by PCR Sport	2	0	0	0	1	60	17th
2024	24H Series - 992 Am	QMMF by HRT	2	2	0	0	2	60	14th
2024	992 Endurance Cup - Am	QMMF by HRT	1	0	0	0	1	0	**1st**
2024	Gulf 12 Hours - 992 Cup	QMMF by HRT Performance	1	0	1	0	1	0	**1st**
2024–25	Asian Le Mans Series - GT	QMMF by Herberth	3	0	0	0	0	0	NC
2024–25	Porsche Carrera Cup Middle East	QMMF by HRT Performance	2	0	0	0	1	29	16th
2025	Middle East Trophy - 992	QMMF by HRT	2	2	1	0	2	80	**1st**
2025	GT World Challenge Europe Endurance Cup	QMMF by Saintéloc Racing	5	0	0	0	0	0	NC
2025	GT World Challenge Europe Endurance Cup - Bronze	QMMF by Saintéloc Racing	5	0	0	0	0	18	22nd
2025	GT World Challenge Europe Sprint Cup	QMMF by Saintéloc Racing	2	0	0	0	0	0	NC
2025	GT World Challenge Europe Sprint Cup - Bronze	QMMF by Saintéloc Racing	2	0	0	0	0	3.5	21st
2025–26	Asian Le Mans Series - GT	QMMF by GetSpeed	6	0	2	0	0	27	13th
2025–26	Porsche Carrera Cup Middle East	QMMF	2	0	0	0	1	24	16th
2026	24H Series - 992-AM	QMMF by HRT Performance	2	2	0	0	2	80*	8th*
2026	European Le Mans Series - LMGT3	Team Qatar by Iron Lynx	6	1	4	0	3	78	**3rd**
2026	24 Hours of Le Mans - LMGT3	Team Qatar by Iron Lynx	1	0	0	0	0	N/A	16th
2026–27	Asian Le Mans Series – GT3	Team Qatar by Iron Lynx						*	*

* Season still in progress.

=== Complete TCR Europe Touring Car Series results ===
(key) (Races in bold indicate pole position) (Races in italics indicate fastest lap)

Year	Team	Make	1	2	3	4	5	6	7	8	9	10	11	12	13	14	Pos.	Points
2019	QMMF Racing by PCR Sport	CUPRA León TCR	HUN; 1; 23	HUN; 2; 19	HOC; 1; 18	HOC; 2; 19	SPA; 1; 29†	SPA; 2 Ret	RBR; 1	RBR; 2	OSC; 1; 16	OSC; 2 Ret	BAR; 1 Ret	BAR; 2 Ret	MNZ; 1; 24	MNZ; 2; 21	38th	0

† Al-Khelaifi did not finish the race, but was classified as he completed over 75% of the race distance.

=== Complete 24H Series results ===
(key) (Races in bold indicate pole position) (Races in italics indicate fastest lap)

Year	Team	Class	Make	Engine	1	2	3	4	5	6	7	Pos.	Points
2024	QMMF by HRT	992-Am	Porsche 992 GT3 Cup	Porsche 4.0 L Flat-6	MUG	SPA	ALG; 12HR	ALG; 24HR	MIS	CAT; 12HR; 1	CAT; 24HR; 1	14th	60

=== Complete Asian Le Mans Series results ===
(key) (Races in bold indicate pole position; results in italics indicate fastest lap)

Year	Entrant	Class	Chassis	Engine	1	2	3	4	5	6	Rank	Points
2024–25	QMMF by Herberth	GT	Porsche 911 GT3 R (992)	Porsche M97/80 4.2 L Flat-6	SEP; 1	SEP; 2	DUB; 1; 17	DUB; 2; 22	ABU; 1 Ret	ABU; 2 WD	NC	0
2025–26	QMMF by GetSpeed	GT	Mercedes-AMG GT3 Evo	Mercedes-AMG M159 6.2 L V8	SEP; 1; 19	SEP; 2; 10	**DUB**; **1**; 4	**DUB**; **2** Ret	ABU; 1; 5	ABU; 2; 16	13th	27
2026–27	Team Qatar by Iron Lynx	GT	Mercedes-AMG GT3 Evo	Mercedes-AMG M159 6.2 L V8	LEC; 1; 1	LEC; 2; 5	JER; 1	JER; 2	ALG; 1	ALG; 2	1st*	35*

=== Complete Porsche Carrera Cup Middle East results ===
(key) (Races in bold indicate pole position) (Races in italics indicate fastest lap)

Year	Team	Class	1	2	3	4	5	6	7	8	9	10	11	12	Pos.	Points
2025–26	QMMF	Pro/Am	BHR1; 1	BHR1; 2	**QAT**; **1**; 2	QAT; 2; 1	DUB; 1	DUB; 2	YAS; 1	YAS; 2	BHR2; 1	BHR2; 2	JED; 1	JED; 2	6th	45

=== Complete Middle East Trophy results ===
(key) (Races in bold indicate pole position) (Races in italics indicate fastest lap)

Year	Team	Class	Make	Engine	1	2	Pos.	Points
2025	QMMF by HRT	Am	Porsche 992 GT3 Cup	Porsche 4.0 L Flat-6	DUB; 1	**YAS**; 1	1st	80

=== Complete GT World Challenge Europe results ===
==== GT World Challenge Europe Endurance Cup ====
(key) (Races in bold indicate pole position) (Races in italics indicate fastest lap)

Year	Team	Car	Class	1	2	3	4	5	6	7	Pos.	Points
2025	QMMF by Saintéloc Racing	Audi R8 LMS Evo II	Bronze	LEC; 47	MNZ; 23	SPA; 6H; 65	SPA; 12H; 58	SPA; 24H; 46	NÜR; 44	CAT; 28	22nd	18

==== GT World Challenge Europe Sprint Cup ====
(key) (Races in bold indicate pole position) (Races in italics indicate fastest lap)

Year	Team	Car	Class	1	2	3	4	5	6	7	8	Pos.	Points
2025	QMMF by Saintéloc Racing	Audi R8 LMS Evo II	Bronze	ZAN; 1	ZAN; 2	MIS; 1	MIS; 2	MAG; 1	MAG; 2	VAL; 1; 28	VAL; 2; 31	21st	3.5

=== Complete European Le Mans Series results ===
(key) (Races in bold indicate pole position; races in italics indicate fastest lap)

Year	Entrant	Class	Chassis	Engine	1	2	3	4	5	6	Rank	Points
2026	Team Qatar by Iron Lynx	LMGT3	Mercedes-AMG GT3 Evo	Mercedes-AMG M159 6.2 L V8	**CAT**; 4	**LEC**; Ret	IMO; 2	SPA; 3	**SIL**; 1	**ALG**; 8	3rd	78

=== Complete 24 Hours of Le Mans results ===
Year	Team	Co-Drivers	Car	Class	Laps	Pos.	Class Pos.
2026	Team Qatar by Iron Lynx	(France) Giuliano Alesi (Germany) Julian Hanses	Mercedes-AMG GT3 Evo	LMGT3	324	48th	16th
