= 2024 24 Hours of Barcelona =

Endurance car race

The layout of the Circuit de Barcelona-Catalunya where the race was held.

The 2024 24 Hours of Barcelona (formally known as the Hankook 24 Hours of Barcelona) was an endurance sportscar racing held on 14 and 15 September 2024, as the final round of the 2024 24H Series. This was the twenty-fifth running of the event.

== Background ==
The event was announced on 16 October 2023 along with the rest of the 2024 24H Series calendar.

== Schedule ==
Date	Time (local: CEST)	Event	Duration
Friday, 13 September	12:45 - 14:15	Free Practice	90 Minutes
Friday, 13 September	16:30 - 17:25	Qualifying – TCE & GT4	3x15 Minutes
Friday, 13 September	17:35 - 18:30	Qualifying – GT3, GTX & 992	3x15 Minutes
Friday, 13 September	20:45 - 22:15	Night Practice	90 Minutes
Saturday-Sunday, 14-15 September	12:00 - 12:00	Race	24 Hours

== Entry list ==
The entry list was revealed on 11 September 2024, and featured 36 cars: 11 GT3 cars, 11 Porsche 992 GT3 Cup cars, 3 GTX cars, 7 GT4 cars, and 4 TCX cars.

No.	Entrant	Car	Class	Driver 1	Driver 2	Driver 3	Driver 4	Driver 5
GT3 (11 entries)
4	(United Kingdom) Optimum Motorsport	McLaren 720S GT3 Evo	P	(United States) Todd Coleman	(United States) Robert Megennis	(Denmark) Frederik Schandorff	(United States) Aaron Telitz	
9	(Netherlands) Red Camel by Juta Racing	Audi R8 LMS Evo II	PA	(Netherlands) Ivo Breukers	(Netherlands) Luc Breukers	(Netherlands) Rik Breukers	(Switzerland) Fabian Danz	
11	(Switzerland) Hofor Racing	Mercedes-AMG GT3	Am	(Germany) Kenneth Heyer	(Switzerland) Michael Kroll	(Germany) Max Partl	(Germany) Alexander Prinz	(Switzerland) Chantal Prinz
14	(Denmark) Poulsen Motorsport	BMW M4 GT3	PA	(Denmark) Kristian Poulsen	(Denmark) Roland Poulsen	(Germany) Jens Klingmann	(Sweden) Alfred Nilsson	
18	(France) Saintéloc Junior Team	Audi R8 LMS Evo II	PA	(Austria) Michael Doppelmayr	(Germany) Elia Erhart	(Germany) Christer Jöns	(Germany) Pierre Kaffer	(France) Stephane Tribaudini
34	(Germany) Land Motorsport	Audi R8 LMS Evo II	Am	(Norway) Wiggo Dalmo	(Germany) Tim Vogler	(Germany) Dr. Johannes Kirchhof	(Germany) Elmar Grimm	(Germany) Ingo Vogler
44	(Slovakia) ARC Bratislava	Lamborghini Huracán GT3 Evo	Am	(Czech Republic) Petr Brecka	(Slovakia) Miro Konôpka	(Slovakia) Adam Konôpka	(Slovakia) Zdeno Mikulasko	(Poland) Andrzej Lewandowski
69	(Lithuania) RD Signs - Siauliai racing team	Lamborghini Huracán GT3 Evo	Am	(Lithuania) Audrius Butkevicius	(Italy) Nicola Michelon	(Lithuania) Paulius Paskevicius	(Lithuania) Ramunas Capkauskas	(Lithuania) Paulius Ruskys
71	(Lithuania) Juta Racing	Audi R8 LMS Evo II	Am	(Lithuania) Arunas Geciauskas	(Lithuania) Sigitas Ambrazevicius	(New Zealand) Francois Beziac	(Lithuania) Eimantas Navikauskas	(Slovakia) Martin Ryba
90	(Spain) E2P Racing	Porsche 911 GT3 R (991.2)	PA	(Spain) Pablo Burguera	(Portugal) Álvaro Parente	(Spain) Antonio Sainero	(Spain) Javier Morcillo	
91	(Germany) Herberth Motorsport	Porsche 911 GT3 R (992)	Am	(Germany) Ralf Bohn	(United States) Jason Hart	(United States) Scott Noble	(United States) Dustin Blattner	
GTX (3 entries)
701	(France) Vortex V8	Vortex 2.0		(France) Lionel Amrouche	(France) Philippe Bonnel	(France) Gilles Courtois	(France) Solenn Amrouche	
702	(France) Vortex V8	Vortex 2.0		(France) Lucas Sugliano	(France) Cyril Calmon	(France) Pierre Fontaine	(France) Miguel Moiola	
714	(Austria) Razoon – More than Racing	KTM X-Bow GT2		(Denmark) Simon Birch	(Poland) Arthur Chwist	(Austria) Daniel Drexel	(Austria) Christian Loimayr	
992 (11 entries)
902	(Denmark) Holmgaard Motorsport	Porsche 992 GT3 Cup	P	(Denmark) Jonas Holmgaard	(Denmark) Magnus Holmgaard	(Canada) Michel Sallenbach	(France) Stéphane Perrin	(Denmark) Martin Vedel Mortensen
903	(Belgium) Red Ant Racing	Porsche 992 GT3 Cup	P	(Belgium) Kobe de Breucker	(Belgium) Ayrton Redant	(Belgium) Yannick Redant	(Belgium) Lars Zaenen	
904	(Belgium) Red Ant Racing	Porsche 992 GT3 Cup	P	(Belgium) Peter Guelinckx	(United Kingdom) Gavin Pickering	(Belgium) Brent Verheyen	(Belgium) Jef Machiels	
907	(Germany) RPM Racing	Porsche 992 GT3 Cup	Am	(Germany) Philip Hamprecht	(Sweden) Niclas Jönsson	(United States) Tracy Krohn	(Netherlands) Patrick Huisman	
917	(Switzerland) Orchid Racing Team	Porsche 992 GT3 Cup	Am	(Switzerland) Antonio Garzon	(France) Laurent Misbach	(Switzerland) Alexandre Mottet	(Switzerland) Jeremy Brodard	(France) Antoine Leclerc
918	(Belgium) Mühlner Motorsport	Porsche 992 GT3 Cup	Am	(United States) Bryan Sircely	(Slovakia) Antal Zsigo	(Estonia) Martin Rump	(Germany) Ben Bünnagel	
931	(Qatar) QMMF by HRT	Porsche 992 GT3 Cup	Am	(Qatar) Ibrahim Al-Abdulghani	(Qatar) Abdulla Ali Al-Khelaifi	(Qatar) Ghanim Ali Al Maadheed	(Germany) Julian Hanses	
949	(Spain) Road to Le Mans	Porsche 992 GT3 Cup	Am	(Spain) Agustin Sanabria Crespo	(Spain) Pablo Bras Silvero	(Spain) Fernando Gonzalez Gonzalez	(Spain) Pedro Miguel Lourinho Bras	(Spain) Francesc Gutierrez Agüi
967	(Germany) HRT Performance	Porsche 992 GT3 Cup	Am	(Germany) Kim André Hauschild	(United Kingdom) Bradley Ellis	(United Kingdom) David Holloway	(Republic of Ireland) Jonathan Kearney	(Belgium) Gary Terclavers
988	(Germany) MRS GT Racing	Porsche 992 GT3 Cup	Am	(Costa Rica) Amadeo Quiros	(Estonia) Antti Rammo	(El Salvador) Rolando Saca	(Costa Rica) Charlie Fonseca	(Finland) Jukka Honkavuori
992	(Netherlands) NKPP Racing by Bas Koeten Racing	Porsche 992 GT3 Cup	Am	(Netherlands) Gijs Bessem	(Netherlands) Harry Hilders	(Netherlands) Bob Herber	(Netherlands) Mark van der Aa	
GT4 (7 entries)
405	(Lithuania) GSR Motorsport	Ginetta G56 GT4		(Lithuania) Egidijus Gelūnas	(Lithuania) Aras Kvedaras	(Lithuania) Rokas Kvedaras	(Lithuania) Mindaugas Liatukas	(Lithuania) Dovydas Ketvirtis
414	(Slovenia) Apex MP Racing	KTM X-Bow GT4		(Slovenia) Mihael Ambroz	(United Kingdom) Peter Matic	(Serbia) Miloš Pavlović	(Italy) Alessio Ruffini	
415	(Spain) NM Racing Team	Mercedes-AMG GT4		(Spain) Guillermo Aso	(United States) Keith Gatehouse	(Switzerland) Maximilien Huber	(Spain) Manel Lao Cornago	Igor Sorokin
421	(United Kingdom) Venture Engineering	Mercedes-AMG GT4		(United Kingdom) Matthew George	(United Kingdom) Owen Hizzey	(United Kingdom) Christopher Jones	(United Kingdom) Neville Jones	
424	(Germany) Lionspeed GP	Porsche 718 Cayman GT4 RS Clubsport		(Germany) Dennis Bohn	(United States) José Garcia	(Germany) Patrick Kolb	(United States) Daniel Miller	
428	(Canada) ST Racing	BMW M4 GT4 Gen II		(Belgium) Fabian Duffieux	(United Kingdom) Pippa Mann	(United States) Jon Miller	(Canada) Samantha Tan	(United States) Neil Verhagen
455	(South Africa) Team Africa Le Mans	Ginetta G55 GT4		(Netherlands) Jeroen Bleekemolen	(Netherlands) Jan Lammers	(South Africa) Greg Mills	(Italy) Cristoforo Pirro	(Italy) Emanuele Pirro
TCE/TCX (4 entries)
101	(Germany) asBest Racing	SEAT León Cup Racer		(Germany) Thomas Ardelt	(Austria) Peter Baumann	(Germany) Kim Berwanger	(Japan) Luigi Stanco	
127	(Germany) SRS Team Sorg Rennsport	Porsche 718 Cayman GT4 Clubsport		(Germany) Henning Eschweiler	(Germany) Richard Jodexnis	(Sweden) Tommy Gråberg	(Mexico) Benito Tagle	
133	(United Kingdom) J-Mec Engineering	BMW M3 E46		(United Kingdom) Jimmy Broadbent	(United Kingdom) Kevin Clarke	(United Kingdom) James Collins	(United Kingdom) Nigel Greensall	
178	(United Kingdom) CWS Engineering	Ginetta G55 Supercup		(United Kingdom) Daniel Morris	(United Kingdom) Colin White	(Australia) Paul Buccini	(United Kingdom) Alistair Mackinnon	

GT3 entries
Icon	Class
P	GT3-Pro
PA	GT3-Pro Am
Am	GT3-Am
992 entries
Icon	Class
P	992-Pro
Am	992-Am

== Practice ==
Class	No.	Entrant	Driver	Time
GT3	18	(France) Saintéloc Junior Team	(Germany) Pierre Kaffer	1:43.089
GTX	714	(Austria) Razoon – More than Racing	(Denmark) Simon Birch	1:46.321
992	917	(Switzerland) Orchid Racing Team	(France) Antoine Leclerc	1:47.209
GT4	428	(Canada) ST Racing	(United States) Neil Verhagen	1:52.134
TCE	178	(United Kingdom) CWS Engineering	(United Kingdom) Colin White	1:54.318

- Note: Only the fastest car in each class is shown.

== Night Practice ==
Class	No.	Entrant	Driver	Time
GT3	4	(United Kingdom) Optimum Motorsport	(United States) Robert Megennis	1:42.286
GTX	714	(Austria) Razoon – More than Racing	(Denmark) Simon Birch	1:48.000
992	917	(Switzerland) Orchid Racing Team	(France) Antoine Leclerc	1:47.569
GT4	428	(Canada) ST Racing	(United States) Neil Verhagen	1:52.046
TCE	133	(United Kingdom) J-Mec Engineering	(United Kingdom) Nigel Greensall	1:54.384

- Note: Only the fastest car in each class is shown.

== Qualifying ==
Qualifying was split into three parts for both groups. The average of the best times per qualifying session determined the starting order. Optimum Racing secured pole position with a combined average time of 1:42.506.

=== Qualifying results ===
Pole position winners in each class are marked in bold.

=== GT3, GTX & 992 ===
Pos.	Class	No.	Team	Q1	Q2	Q3	Avg
1	**GT3 Pro**	**4**	**(United Kingdom) Optimum Motorsport**	1:43.662	1:41.775	1:42.082	**1:42.506**
2	**GT3 Pro/Am**	**18**	**(France) Saintéloc Junior Team**	1:42.956	1:42.662	1:42.792	**1:42.803**
3	GT3 Pro/Am	14	(Denmark) Poulsen Motorsport	1:44.490	1:42.261	1:42.094	1:42.948
4	**GT3 Am**	**11**	**(Switzerland) Hofor Racing**	1:42.522	1:43.937	1:44.462	**1:43.640**
5	GT3 Am	91	(Germany) Herberth Motorsport	1:43.843	1:43.407	1:44.359	1:43.869
6	GT3 Pro/Am	9	(Netherlands) Red Camel by Juta Racing	1:45.462	1:44.187	1:44.705	1:44.784
7	GT3 Pro/Am	90	(Spain) E2P Racing	1:45.036	1:44.314	1:45.678	1:45.009
8	GT3 Pro/Am	69	(Lithuania) RD Signs - Siauliai racing team	1:45.769	1:44.208	1:45.446	1:45.141
9	GT3 Am	34	(Germany) Land Motorsport	1:45.377	1:47.295	1:44.255	1:45.642
10	GT3 Am	44	(Slovakia) ARC Bratislava	1:47.198	1:46.214	1:45.602	1:46.338
11	**GTX**	**714**	**(Austria) Razoon – More than Racing**	1:47.651	1:46.667	1:45.855	**1:46.724**
12	**992 Pro**	**903**	**(Belgium) Red Ant Racing**	1:45.643	1:47.378	1:47.169	**1:46.730**
13	**992 Am**	**907**	**(Germany) RPM Racing**	1:49.042	1:47.442	1:46.146	**1:47.543**
14	992 Am	949	(Spain) Road to Le Mans	1:48.292	1:47.180	1:47.392	1:47.621
15	992 Pro	904	(Belgium) Red Ant Racing	1:47.849	1:47.092	1:48.013	1:47.651
16	992 Am	931	(Qatar) QMMF by HRT	1:48.818	1:47.360	1:46.823	1:47.667
17	GTX	702	(France) Vortex V8	1:49.577	1:47.433	1:47.118	1:48.042
18	992 Am	988	(Germany) MRS GT Racing	1:47.870	1:49.449	1:46.851	1:48.056
19	992 Pro	902	(Denmark) Holmgaard Motorsport	1:48.461	1:47.944	1:48.146	1:48.183
20	992 Am	967	(Germany) HRT Performance	1:49.009	1:48.210	1:48.572	1:48.597
21	992 Am	918	(Belgium) Mühlner Motorsport	1:50.127	1:47.044	1:48.775	1:48.648
22	GTX	701	(France) Vortex V8	1:49.625	1:49.973	1:47.264	1:48.954
23	992 Am	992	(Netherlands) NKPP Racing by Bas Koeten Racing	1:49.580	1:49.350	1:49.422	1:49.450
24	992 Am	917	(Switzerland) Orchid Racing Team	1:48.319	1:50.499	1:54.769	1:51.195
–	GT3 Am	71	(Lithuania) Juta Racing	No Time	No Time	No Time	No Time

=== TCE & GT4 ===
Pos.	Class	No.	Team	Q1	Q2	Q3	Avg
1	**GT4**	**405**	**(Lithuania) GSR Motorsport**	1:51.827	1:51.304	1:52.845	**1:51.992**
2	GT4	428	(Canada) ST Racing	1:52.015	1:52.439	1:53.054	1:52.502
3	GT4	424	(Germany) Lionspeed GP	1:52.907	1:53.223	1:52.839	1:52.989
4	GT4	421	(United Kingdom) Venture Engineering	1:54.416	1:52.480	1:52.272	1:53.056
5	GT4	415	(Spain) NM Racing Team	1:53.028	1:52.918	1:53.895	1:53.280
6	GT4	414	(Slovenia) Apex MP Racing	1:54.379	1:54.426	1:51.486	1:53.430
7	**TCE**	**133**	**(United Kingdom) J-Mec Engineering**	1:56.741	1:52.949	1:52.820	**1:54.170**
8	TCE	178	(United Kingdom) CWS Racing	1:53.790	1:55.564	1:54.289	1:54.547
9	GT4	455	(South Africa) Team Africa Le Mans	1:56.486	1:55.427	1:53.016	1:54.976
10	TCE	101	(Germany) asBest Racing	1:57.259	1:57.416	1:58.937	1:57.870
11	TCE	127	(Germany) SRS Team Sorg Rennsport	No Time	1:57.817	1:58.455	1:58.136

== Race ==
Class winners are in bold.

Pos	Class	No	Team	Drivers	Car	Time/Reason	Laps
Pos	Class	No	Team	Drivers	Engine	Time/Reason	Laps
1	**GT3 Am**	**91**	**(Germany) Herberth Motorsport**	**(Germany) Ralf Bohn** **(United States) Jason Hart** **(United States) Scott Noble** **(United States) Dustin Blattner**	**Porsche 911 GT3 R (992)**	**24:00:5.461**	**738**
1	**GT3 Am**	**91**	**(Germany) Herberth Motorsport**	**(Germany) Ralf Bohn** **(United States) Jason Hart** **(United States) Scott Noble** **(United States) Dustin Blattner**	**Porsche M97/80 4.2 L Flat-6**	**24:00:5.461**	**738**
2	**GT3 Pro/Am**	**18**	**(France) Saintéloc Junior Team**	**(Austria) Michael Doppelmayr** **(Germany) Elia Erhart** **(Germany) Christer Jöns** **(Germany) Pierre Kaffer** **(France) Stephane Tribaudini**	**Audi R8 LMS Evo II**	**+2 Laps**	**736**
2	**GT3 Pro/Am**	**18**	**(France) Saintéloc Junior Team**	**(Austria) Michael Doppelmayr** **(Germany) Elia Erhart** **(Germany) Christer Jöns** **(Germany) Pierre Kaffer** **(France) Stephane Tribaudini**	**Audi 5.2 L V10**	**+2 Laps**	**736**
3	GT3 Pro/Am	14	(Denmark) Poulsen Motorsport	(Denmark) Kristian Poulsen (Denmark) Roland Poulsen (Germany) Jens Klingmann (Sweden) Alfred Nilsson	BMW M4 GT3	+6 Laps	732
3	GT3 Pro/Am	14	(Denmark) Poulsen Motorsport	(Denmark) Kristian Poulsen (Denmark) Roland Poulsen (Germany) Jens Klingmann (Sweden) Alfred Nilsson	BMW S58B30T0 3.0 L Turbo I6	+6 Laps	732
4	GT3 Pro/Am	9	(Netherlands) Red Camel by Juta Racing	(Netherlands) Ivo Breukers (Netherlands) Luc Breukers (Netherlands) Rik Breukers (Switzerland) Fabian Danz	Audi R8 LMS Evo II	+7 Laps	731
4	GT3 Pro/Am	9	(Netherlands) Red Camel by Juta Racing	(Netherlands) Ivo Breukers (Netherlands) Luc Breukers (Netherlands) Rik Breukers (Switzerland) Fabian Danz	Audi 5.2 L V10	+7 Laps	731
5	GT3 Am	11	(Switzerland) Hofor Racing	(Germany) Kenneth Heyer (Switzerland) Michael Kroll (Germany) Max Partl (Germany) Alexander Prinz (Switzerland) Chantal Prinz	Mercedes-AMG GT3	+19 Laps	719
5	GT3 Am	11	(Switzerland) Hofor Racing	(Germany) Kenneth Heyer (Switzerland) Michael Kroll (Germany) Max Partl (Germany) Alexander Prinz (Switzerland) Chantal Prinz	Mercedes-AMG M159 6.2 L V8	+19 Laps	719
6	**992 Pro**	**903**	**(Belgium) Red Ant Racing**	**(Belgium) Kobe de Breucker** **(Belgium) Ayrton Redant** **(Belgium) Yannick Redant** **(Belgium) Lars Zaenen**	**Porsche 992 GT3 Cup**	**+24 Laps**	**714**
6	**992 Pro**	**903**	**(Belgium) Red Ant Racing**	**(Belgium) Kobe de Breucker** **(Belgium) Ayrton Redant** **(Belgium) Yannick Redant** **(Belgium) Lars Zaenen**	**Porsche 4.0 L Flat-6**	**+24 Laps**	**714**
7 DNF	**GT3 Pro**	**4**	**(United Kingdom) Optimum Motorsport**	**(United States) Todd Coleman** **(United States) Robert Megennis** **(Denmark) Frederik Schandorff** **(United States) Aaron Telitz**	**McLaren 720S GT3 Evo**	**Fuel pressure**	**710**
7 DNF	**GT3 Pro**	**4**	**(United Kingdom) Optimum Motorsport**	**(United States) Todd Coleman** **(United States) Robert Megennis** **(Denmark) Frederik Schandorff** **(United States) Aaron Telitz**	**McLaren M840T 4.0 L Turbo V8**	**Fuel pressure**	**710**
8	**992 Am**	**931**	**(Qatar) QMMF by HRT**	**(Qatar) Ibrahim Al-Abdulghani** **(Qatar) Abdulla Ali Al-Khelaifi** **(Qatar) Ghanim Ali Al Maadheed** **(Germany) Julian Hanses**	**Porsche 992 GT3 Cup**	**+28 Laps**	**710**
8	**992 Am**	**931**	**(Qatar) QMMF by HRT**	**(Qatar) Ibrahim Al-Abdulghani** **(Qatar) Abdulla Ali Al-Khelaifi** **(Qatar) Ghanim Ali Al Maadheed** **(Germany) Julian Hanses**	**Porsche 4.0 L Flat-6**	**+28 Laps**	**710**
9	GT3 Pro/Am	71	(Lithuania) Juta Racing	(Lithuania) Arunas Geciauskas (Lithuania) Sigitas Ambrazevicius (New Zealand) Francois Beziac (Lithuania) Eimantas Navikauskas (Slovakia) Martin Ryba	Audi R8 LMS Evo II	+30 Laps	708
9	GT3 Pro/Am	71	(Lithuania) Juta Racing	(Lithuania) Arunas Geciauskas (Lithuania) Sigitas Ambrazevicius (New Zealand) Francois Beziac (Lithuania) Eimantas Navikauskas (Slovakia) Martin Ryba	Audi 5.2 L V10	+30 Laps	708
10	992 Am	907	(Germany) RPM Racing	(Germany) Philip Hamprecht (Sweden) Niclas Jönsson (United States) Tracy Krohn (Netherlands) Patrick Huisman	Porsche 992 GT3 Cup	+32 Laps	706
10	992 Am	907	(Germany) RPM Racing	(Germany) Philip Hamprecht (Sweden) Niclas Jönsson (United States) Tracy Krohn (Netherlands) Patrick Huisman	Porsche 4.0 L Flat-6	+32 Laps	706
11	GT3 Am	34	(Germany) Land Motorsport	(Norway) Wiggo Dalmo (Germany) Elmar Grimm (Germany) Dr. Johannes Kirchhoff (Germany) Tim Vogler (Germany) Ingo Vogler	Audi R8 LMS Evo II	+40 Laps	698
11	GT3 Am	34	(Germany) Land Motorsport	(Norway) Wiggo Dalmo (Germany) Elmar Grimm (Germany) Dr. Johannes Kirchhoff (Germany) Tim Vogler (Germany) Ingo Vogler	Audi 5.2 L V10	+40 Laps	698
12	992 Am	967	(Germany) HRT Performance	(United Kingdom) Bradley Ellis (Germany) Kim André Hauschild (United Kingdom) David Holloway (Republic of Ireland) Jonathan Kearney (Belgium) Gary Terclavers	Porsche 992 GT3 Cup	+42 Laps	696
12	992 Am	967	(Germany) HRT Performance	(United Kingdom) Bradley Ellis (Germany) Kim André Hauschild (United Kingdom) David Holloway (Republic of Ireland) Jonathan Kearney (Belgium) Gary Terclavers	Porsche 4.0 L Flat-6	+42 Laps	696
13	992 Am	917	(Switzerland) Orchid Racing Team	(Switzerland) Antonio Garzon (France) Laurent Misbach (Switzerland) Alexandre Mottet (Switzerland) Jeremy Brodard (France) Antoine Leclerc	Porsche 992 GT3 Cup	+62 Laps	676
13	992 Am	917	(Switzerland) Orchid Racing Team	(Switzerland) Antonio Garzon (France) Laurent Misbach (Switzerland) Alexandre Mottet (Switzerland) Jeremy Brodard (France) Antoine Leclerc	Porsche 4.0 L Flat-6	+62 Laps	676
14	**GT4**	**421**	**(United Kingdom) Venture Engineering**	**(United Kingdom) Matthew George** **(United Kingdom) Owen Hizzey** **(United Kingdom) Christopher Jones** **(United Kingdom) Neville Jones**	**Mercedes-AMG GT4**	**+63 Laps**	**675**
14	**GT4**	**421**	**(United Kingdom) Venture Engineering**	**(United Kingdom) Matthew George** **(United Kingdom) Owen Hizzey** **(United Kingdom) Christopher Jones** **(United Kingdom) Neville Jones**	**Mercedes-AMG M178 4.0 L V8**	**+63 Laps**	**675**
15	GT4	428	(Canada) ST Racing	(Belgium) Fabian Duffieux (United Kingdom) Pippa Mann (United States) Jon Miller (Canada) Samantha Tan (United States) Neil Verhagen	BMW M4 GT4 Gen II	+63 Laps	675
15	GT4	428	(Canada) ST Racing	(Belgium) Fabian Duffieux (United Kingdom) Pippa Mann (United States) Jon Miller (Canada) Samantha Tan (United States) Neil Verhagen	BMW N55 3.0 L Twin-Turbo I6	+63 Laps	675
16	992 Am	988	(Germany) MRS GT Racing	(Costa Rica) Amadeo Quiros (Estonia) Antti Rammo (El Salvador) Rolando Saca (Costa Rica) Charlie Fonseca (Finland) Jukka Honkavuori	Porsche 992 GT3 Cup	+66 Laps	672
16	992 Am	988	(Germany) MRS GT Racing	(Costa Rica) Amadeo Quiros (Estonia) Antti Rammo (El Salvador) Rolando Saca (Costa Rica) Charlie Fonseca (Finland) Jukka Honkavuori	Porsche 4.0 L Flat-6	+66 Laps	672
17	GT4	424	(Germany) Lionspeed GP	(Germany) Dennis Bohn (United States) José Garcia (Germany) Patrick Kolb (United States) Daniel Miller	Porsche 718 Cayman GT4 RS Clubsport	+67 Laps	671
17	GT4	424	(Germany) Lionspeed GP	(Germany) Dennis Bohn (United States) José Garcia (Germany) Patrick Kolb (United States) Daniel Miller	Porsche 4.0 L Flat-6	+67 Laps	671
18	GT4	415	(Spain) NM Racing Team	(Spain) Guillermo Aso (United States) Keith Gatehouse (Switzerland) Maximilien Huber (Spain) Manel Lao Cornago; Igor Sorokin	Mercedes-AMG GT4	+68 Laps	670
18	GT4	415	(Spain) NM Racing Team	(Spain) Guillermo Aso (United States) Keith Gatehouse (Switzerland) Maximilien Huber (Spain) Manel Lao Cornago; Igor Sorokin	Mercedes-AMG M178 4.0 L V8	+68 Laps	670
19	992 Am	918	(Belgium) Mühlner Motorsport	(United States) Bryan Sircely (Slovakia) Antal Zsigo (Estonia) Martin Rump (Germany) Ben Bünnagel	Porsche 992 GT3 Cup	+76 Laps	662
19	992 Am	918	(Belgium) Mühlner Motorsport	(United States) Bryan Sircely (Slovakia) Antal Zsigo (Estonia) Martin Rump (Germany) Ben Bünnagel	Porsche 4.0 L Flat-6	+76 Laps	662
20	**TCX**	**127**	**(Germany) SRS Team Sorg Rennsport**	**(Germany) Henning Eschweiler** **(Sweden) Tommy Gråberg** **(Germany) Richard Jodexnis** **(Mexico) Benito Tagle**	**Porsche 718 Cayman GT4 Clubsport**	**+102 Laps**	**636**
20	**TCX**	**127**	**(Germany) SRS Team Sorg Rennsport**	**(Germany) Henning Eschweiler** **(Sweden) Tommy Gråberg** **(Germany) Richard Jodexnis** **(Mexico) Benito Tagle**	**Porsche 3.8 L V6**	**+102 Laps**	**636**
21	GT4	405	(Lithuania) GSR Motorsport	(Lithuania) Egidijus Gelūnas (Lithuania) Aras Kvedaras (Lithuania) Rokas Kvedaras (Lithuania) Mindaugas Liatukas (Lithuania) Dovydas Ketvirtis	Ginetta G56 GT4	+103 Laps	635
21	GT4	405	(Lithuania) GSR Motorsport	(Lithuania) Egidijus Gelūnas (Lithuania) Aras Kvedaras (Lithuania) Rokas Kvedaras (Lithuania) Mindaugas Liatukas (Lithuania) Dovydas Ketvirtis	GM LS3 6.2 L V8	+103 Laps	635
22	**GTX**	**701**	**(France) Vortex V8**	**(France) Lionel Amrouche** **(France) Philippe Bonnel** **(France) Gilles Courtois** **(France) Solenn Amrouche**	**Vortex 2.0**	**+128 Laps**	**610**
22	**GTX**	**701**	**(France) Vortex V8**	**(France) Lionel Amrouche** **(France) Philippe Bonnel** **(France) Gilles Courtois** **(France) Solenn Amrouche**	**Chevrolet 6.2 L V8**	**+128 Laps**	**610**
23	GT4	414	(Slovenia) Apex MP Racing	(Slovenia) Mihael Ambroz (United Kingdom) Peter Matic (Serbia) Miloš Pavlović (Italy) Alessio Ruffini	KTM X-Bow GT4	+146 Laps	592
23	GT4	414	(Slovenia) Apex MP Racing	(Slovenia) Mihael Ambroz (United Kingdom) Peter Matic (Serbia) Miloš Pavlović (Italy) Alessio Ruffini	Audi 4.0 L I4	+146 Laps	592
24	TCX	133	(United Kingdom) J-Mec Engineering	(United Kingdom) Jimmy Broadbent (United Kingdom) Kevin Clarke (United Kingdom) James Collins (United Kingdom) Nigel Greensall	BMW M3 E46	+162 Laps	576
24	TCX	133	(United Kingdom) J-Mec Engineering	(United Kingdom) Jimmy Broadbent (United Kingdom) Kevin Clarke (United Kingdom) James Collins (United Kingdom) Nigel Greensall	BMW 3.0 L I4	+162 Laps	576
25 DNF	GT3 Pro/Am	90	(Spain) E2P Racing	(Spain) Pablo Burguera (Portugal) Álvaro Parente (Spain) Antonio Sainero (Spain) Javier Morcillo	Porsche 911 GT3 R (991.2)	Power steering	570
25 DNF	GT3 Pro/Am	90	(Spain) E2P Racing	(Spain) Pablo Burguera (Portugal) Álvaro Parente (Spain) Antonio Sainero (Spain) Javier Morcillo	Porsche 4.0 L Flat-6	Power steering	570
26	992 Pro	902	(Denmark) Holmgaard Motorsport	(Denmark) Jonas Holmgaard (Denmark) Magnus Holmgaard (Canada) Michel Sallenbach (France) Stéphane Perrin (Denmark) Martin Vedel Mortensen	Porsche 992 GT3 Cup	+172 Laps	566
26	992 Pro	902	(Denmark) Holmgaard Motorsport	(Denmark) Jonas Holmgaard (Denmark) Magnus Holmgaard (Canada) Michel Sallenbach (France) Stéphane Perrin (Denmark) Martin Vedel Mortensen	Porsche 4.0 L Flat-6	+172 Laps	566
27	TCX	101	(Germany) asBest Racing	(Germany) Thomas Ardelt (Austria) Peter Baumann (Germany) Kim Berwanger (Japan) Luigi Stanco	SEAT León Cup Racer	+206 Laps	532
27	TCX	101	(Germany) asBest Racing	(Germany) Thomas Ardelt (Austria) Peter Baumann (Germany) Kim Berwanger (Japan) Luigi Stanco	Volkswagen 2.0 L I4	+206 Laps	532
28	GTX	714	(Austria) Razoon – More than Racing	(Denmark) Simon Birch (Poland) Arthur Chwist (Austria) Daniel Drexel (Austria) Christian Loimayr	KTM X-Bow GT2	+241 Laps	497
28	GTX	714	(Austria) Razoon – More than Racing	(Denmark) Simon Birch (Poland) Arthur Chwist (Austria) Daniel Drexel (Austria) Christian Loimayr	Audi 2.5 L I5	+241 Laps	497
29 DNF	GTX	702	(France) Vortex V8	(France) Cyril Calmon (France) Pierre Fontaine (France) Lucas Sugliano (France) Miguel Moiola	Vortex 2.0	Differential	493
29 DNF	GTX	702	(France) Vortex V8	(France) Cyril Calmon (France) Pierre Fontaine (France) Lucas Sugliano (France) Miguel Moiola	Chevrolet 6.2 L V8	Differential	493
30 DNF	992 Pro	904	(Belgium) Red Ant Racing	(Belgium) Peter Guelinckx (United Kingdom) Gavin Pickering (Belgium) Brent Verheyen (Belgium) Jef Machiels	Porsche 992 GT3 Cup	Electrical	469
30 DNF	992 Pro	904	(Belgium) Red Ant Racing	(Belgium) Peter Guelinckx (United Kingdom) Gavin Pickering (Belgium) Brent Verheyen (Belgium) Jef Machiels	Porsche 4.0 L Flat-6	Electrical	469
31 DNF	992 Am	992	(Netherlands) NKPP Racing by Bas Koeten Racing	(Netherlands) Gijs Bessem (Netherlands) Harry Hilders (Netherlands) Bob Herber (Netherlands) Mark van der Aa	Porsche 992 GT3 Cup	Crash	370
31 DNF	992 Am	992	(Netherlands) NKPP Racing by Bas Koeten Racing	(Netherlands) Gijs Bessem (Netherlands) Harry Hilders (Netherlands) Bob Herber (Netherlands) Mark van der Aa	Porsche 4.0 L Flat-6	Crash	370
32	GT4	455	(South Africa) Team Africa Le Mans	(Netherlands) Jeroen Bleekemolen (Netherlands) Jan Lammers (South Africa) Greg Mills (Italy) Cristoforo Pirro (Italy) Emanuele Pirro	Ginetta G55 GT4	+377 Laps	361
32	GT4	455	(South Africa) Team Africa Le Mans	(Netherlands) Jeroen Bleekemolen (Netherlands) Jan Lammers (South Africa) Greg Mills (Italy) Cristoforo Pirro (Italy) Emanuele Pirro	Ford Cyclone 3.7 L V6	+377 Laps	361
33 DNF	GT3 Pro/Am	69	(Lithuania) RD Signs - Siauliai racing team	(Lithuania) Audrius Butkevicius (Italy) Nicola Machelon (Lithuania) Paulius Paskevicius (Lithuania) Ramunas Capkauskas (Lithuania) Paulius Ruskys	Lamborghini Huracán GT3	+530 Laps	208
33 DNF	GT3 Pro/Am	69	(Lithuania) RD Signs - Siauliai racing team	(Lithuania) Audrius Butkevicius (Italy) Nicola Machelon (Lithuania) Paulius Paskevicius (Lithuania) Ramunas Capkauskas (Lithuania) Paulius Ruskys	Lamborghini DGF 5.2 L V10	+530 Laps	208
34 DNF	TCX	178	(United Kingdom) CWS Engineering	(United Kingdom) Daniel Morris (United Kingdom) Colin White (Australia) Paul Buccini (United Kingdom) Alistair Mackinnon	Ginetta G55 Supercup	+532 Laps	206
34 DNF	TCX	178	(United Kingdom) CWS Engineering	(United Kingdom) Daniel Morris (United Kingdom) Colin White (Australia) Paul Buccini (United Kingdom) Alistair Mackinnon	Ford Cyclone 3.7 L V6	+532 Laps	206
35 DNF	992 Am	949	(Spain) Road to Le Mans	(Spain) Agustin Sanabria Crespo (Spain) Pablo Bras Silvero (Spain) Fernando Gonzalez Gonzalez (Spain) Pedro Miguel Lourinho Bras (Spain) Francesc Gutierrez Agüi	Porsche 992 GT3 Cup	+591 Laps	147
35 DNF	992 Am	949	(Spain) Road to Le Mans	(Spain) Agustin Sanabria Crespo (Spain) Pablo Bras Silvero (Spain) Fernando Gonzalez Gonzalez (Spain) Pedro Miguel Lourinho Bras (Spain) Francesc Gutierrez Agüi	Porsche 4.0 L Flat-6	+591 Laps	147
36 DNF	GT3 Am	44	(Slovakia) ARC Bratislava	(Czech Republic) Petr Brecka (Slovakia) Miro Konôpka (Slovakia) Adam Konôpka (Slovakia) Zdeno Mikulasko (Poland) Andrzej Lewandowski	Lamborghini Huracán GT3 Evo	+611 Laps	127
36 DNF	GT3 Am	44	(Slovakia) ARC Bratislava	(Czech Republic) Petr Brecka (Slovakia) Miro Konôpka (Slovakia) Adam Konôpka (Slovakia) Zdeno Mikulasko (Poland) Andrzej Lewandowski	Lamborghini DGF 5.2 L V10	+611 Laps	127

24H Series
Previous race: 12 Hours of Misano	2024 season	Next race: None
