= 24H Series Middle East =

Auto racing series in the Middle East

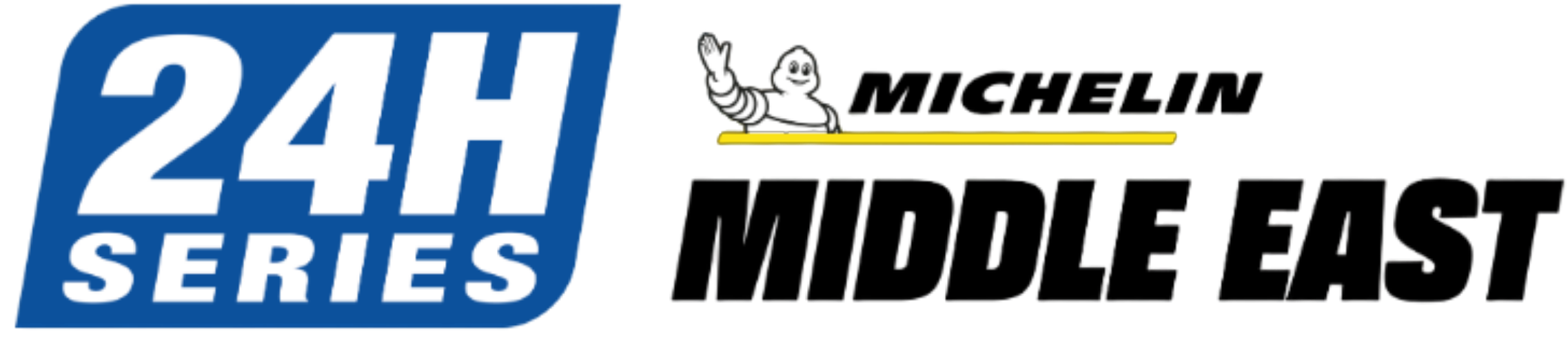
- Category: Grand tourer Touring cars Endurance racing
- Country: Middle East; Southeast Asia
- Inaugural season: 2022–23
- Tyre suppliers: Hankook (2022–2024); Michelin (2025–present)
- Official website: https://www.24hseries.com/

The 24H Series Middle East (formerly known as the Middle East Trophy from 2022–2025) is a sports car racing and touring car racing series developed by Creventic and with approval from the Fédération Internationale de l'Automobile (FIA), based in the Middle East. The races in the series are contested with GT3-spec cars, GT4-spec cars, sports cars, 24H-Specials, like silhouette cars, TCR Touring Cars, TCX cars and TC cars. The calendar consists of rounds ranging from 6-hour to 24-hour races.

== Creventic ==
The Dutch agency Creventic is the organiser and promoter of the series. Their goals are to organise races with "low costs, a convivial atmosphere with teams and drivers from all over the world and fair competition on the track." In co-operation with the Dutch National Racing Team (DNRT) – one of the biggest motorsport organisations of the Benelux – they organised the inaugural Dubai 24 Hour in 2006. Creventic is also the organiser of the 24H Series and the Touring Car Endurance Series.

== History ==
On 23 September 2022, Creventic announced the formation of the Middle East Trophy, a championship separate from the European leg of the 24H Series, with the first race taking place on 30 November. On 23 September 2023, it was announced that the series would return for the 2023–24 season. On 18 June 2025, the series announced that it would expand to Southeast Asia with a round at Sepang International Circuit in Sepang, Malaysia, while also changing its name to 24H Series Middle East.

== Circuits ==
- (United Arab Emirates) Dubai Autodrome (2023–2026)
- Kuwait Motor Town (2022–2023)
- (United Arab Emirates) Yas Marina Circuit (2023–2026)
- (Malaysia) Sepang International Circuit (2025)

== Champions ==
=== Drivers ===
Year	GT3 Pro	GT3 Pro/Am	GT3 Am	992 Pro	992 Am	GTX	GT4	TCE	TCR	TCX	TC
2022–23	(Germany) Alfred Renauer	(Germany) Pierre Kaffer (Austria) Michael Doppelmayr (Germany) Elia Erhart	(United States) Charles Espenlaub (United States) Joe Foster (United States) Charles Putman (United States) Shane Lewis	(Italy) Fabrizio Broggi (Romania) Sergiu Nicolae (Italy) Sabino de Castro	(Qatar) Abdulla Ali Al Khelaifi	(Austria) Daniel Drexel	(United Kingdom) David Holloway	—	(Switzerland) Jasmin Preisig (Latvia) Ivars Vallers	(Germany) Daniel Gregor (Switzerland) Patrick Grütter (Germany) Christoph Krombach (Mexico) Benito Tagle	(Germany) Hermann Bock (Germany) Michael Bonk (Switzerland) Martin Kroll (Germany) Michael Mayer (Germany) Rainer Partl
2023–24	(Italy) Fabrizio Broggi (Italy) Sabino de Castro (Romania) Sergiu Nicolae (Italy) Cosimo Papi	(United Kingdom) Jack Barlow (United Kingdom) Carl Cavers (United Kingdom) Lewis Plato	(United States) Charles Espenlaub (United States) Joe Foster (United States) Charles Putman (United States) Shane Lewis	(Netherlands) Ivo Breukers (Netherlands) Luc Breukers (Netherlands) Rik Breukers (Switzerland) Fabian Danz	(Qatar) Ibrahim Al-Abdulghani (Qatar) Abdulla Ali Al-Khelaifi (Qatar) Ghanim Ali Al Maadheed (Germany) Julian Hanses	(United Kingdom) Mike Simpson (United Kingdom) Freddie Tomlinson (United Kingdom) Lawrence Tomlinson	(Kyrgyzstan) Andrey Solukovtsev (Cyprus) Vasily Vladykin	(United Kingdom) James Kaye	(United Kingdom) James Kaye	(United Kingdom) Colin White (United Kingdom) Owen Hizzey	—
2025	(Netherlands) Loek Hartog	Sergey Stolyarov	(Switzerland) Michael Kroll (Switzerland) Alexander Prinz (Switzerland) Chantal Prinz (Germany) Timo Rumpfkeil	(Qatar) Ibrahim Al-Abdulghani (Qatar) Abdulla Ali Al-Khelaifi (Qatar) Ghanim Ali Al Maadheed (Germany) Julian Hanses	(Qatar) Ibrahim Al-Abdulghani (Qatar) Abdulla Ali Al-Khelaifi (Qatar) Ghanim Ali Al Maadheed (Germany) Julian Hanses	(Australia) Jake Camilleri (Australia) Darren Currie (Australia) Grant Donaldson	(Romania) Tudor Tudurachi	—	—	—	—

=== Teams ===
Year	GT3 Pro	GT3 Pro/Am	GT3 Am	992 Pro	992 Am	GTX	GT4	TCE	TCR	TCX	TC
2022–23	(Germany) No. 91 Herberth Motorsport	(Germany) No. 1 Phoenix Racing	(United States) No. 85 CP Racing	(Romania) No. 955 Willi Motorsport by Ebimotors	(Germany) No. 928 HRT Performance	(Austria) No. 714 razoon – more than racing	(United Kingdom) No. 429 Century Motorsport	—	(Switzerland) No. 121 Autorama Motorsport by Wolf-Power Racing	—	—
2023–24	(United Arab Emirates) No. 95 Manamauri Energy by Ebimotors	(United Kingdom) No. 22 Century Motorsport	(United States) No. 85 CP Racing	(Netherlands) No. 909 Red Camel-Jordans.nl	No. 931 QMMF by HRT Suhail Qatar	(United Kingdom) No. 795 Toro Verde GT	(United Kingdom) No. 429 Century Motorsport	(United Kingdom) No. 138 Simpson Motorsport	(United Kingdom) No. 138 Simpson Motorsport	(United Kingdom) No. 278 CWS Engineering	—
2025	(United States) No. 16 Winward Racing	(United States) No. 16 Winward Racing	(United States) No. 11 Hofor Racing	No. 974 QMMF by HRT Suhail Qatar	No. 974 QMMF by HRT Suhail Qatar	(Australia) No. 111 111 Racing	(United Kingdom) No. 438 Simpson Motorsport	(Germany) No. 102 AsBest Racing	(Germany) No. 102 AsBest Racing	—	—
