= 2024 Gulf 12 Hours =

14th Gulf 12 Hours endurance race

Race details
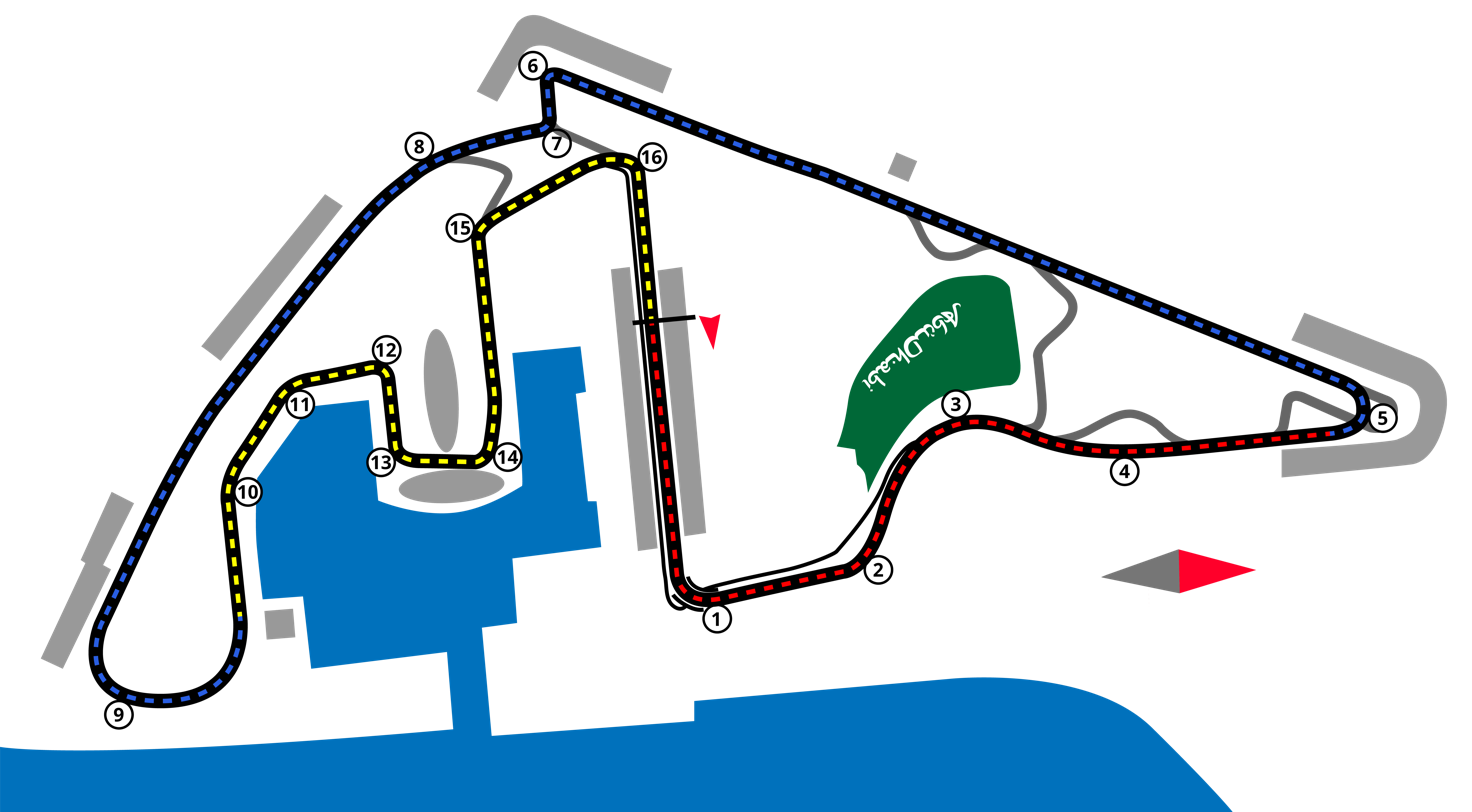
Date	15 December 2024
Official name	Lenovo Gulf 12 Hours
Location	Yas Island, Abu Dhabi, UAE
Course	Permanent circuit 5.281 km (3.281 mi)
Distance	Race; 12 hours
- Qualifying

Pole
Drivers	(United States) Dustin Blattner (Germany) Ralf Bohn (Germany) Alfred Renauer	(Germany) Herberth Motorsport
Avg Time	1:52.896
- Race

Fastest lap
Driver	(Italy) Davide Rigon	(Switzerland) Kessel Racing
Time	1:51.659

Podium
First	(Belgium) Gilles Magnus (Germany) Dennis Marschall (China) Bihuang Zhou	(France) Saintéloc Racing
Second	(United States) Todd Coleman (Denmark) Frederik Schandorff (United States) Aaron Telitz	(United Kingdom) Optimum Motorsport
Third	Sergei Borisov (Germany) Sven Müller; Sergey Stolyarov	(Germany) Proton Huber Competition

The 2024 Gulf 12 Hours (officially titled 2024 Lenovo Gulf 12 Hours) was the 14th edition of the Gulf 12 Hours, and was held at Yas Marina Circuit on 13–15 December 2024. For the first time since the 12th edition of the race, it was not part of the Intercontinental GT Challenge. Therefore, the race reverted to a split format, with a break after 8 Hours, as opposed to earlier editions that had the break after 6 Hours. Also returning this year is the 992 Cup class reserved for Porsche 992 GT3 Cup cars.

== Entry list ==
Team	Car	No.	Drivers	Class
GT3
(Antigua and Barbuda) HAAS RT	Audi R8 LMS Evo II	2	(Australia) John Corbett	Am
(Antigua and Barbuda) HAAS RT	Audi R8 LMS Evo II	2	(Belgium) Xavier Knauf	Am
(Antigua and Barbuda) HAAS RT	Audi R8 LMS Evo II	2	(Belgium) Grégory Servais	Am
(Antigua and Barbuda) HAAS RT	Audi R8 LMS Evo II	2	(United Kingdom) Casper Stevenson	Am
(Bahrain) 2 Seas - Grove Racing	Mercedes-AMG GT3 Evo	4	(Andorra) Jules Gounon	P
(Bahrain) 2 Seas - Grove Racing	Mercedes-AMG GT3 Evo	4	(Australia) Brenton Grove	P
(Bahrain) 2 Seas - Grove Racing	Mercedes-AMG GT3 Evo	4	(Australia) Stephen Grove	P
(Germany) Racing One	Ferrari 296 GT3	6	(Italy) Giacomo Altoè	PA
(Germany) Racing One	Ferrari 296 GT3	6	(Austria) Ernst Kirchmayr	PA
(Germany) Racing One	Ferrari 296 GT3	6	(Spain) Roberto Merhi	PA
(Germany) Racing One	Ferrari 296 GT3	6	(Australia) Mark Rosser	PA
(Germany) Herberth Motorsport	Porsche 911 GT3 R (992)	7	(United States) Dustin Blattner	Am
(Germany) Herberth Motorsport	Porsche 911 GT3 R (992)	7	(Germany) Ralf Bohn	Am
(Germany) Herberth Motorsport	Porsche 911 GT3 R (992)	7	(Germany) Alfred Renauer	Am
(United Kingdom) Garage 59	McLaren 720S GT3 Evo	8	(Monaco) Louis Prette	PA
(United Kingdom) Garage 59	McLaren 720S GT3 Evo	8	(Monaco) Philippe Prette	PA
(United Kingdom) Garage 59	McLaren 720S GT3 Evo	8	(United Kingdom) Adam Smalley	PA
(United Kingdom) Garage 59	McLaren 720S GT3 Evo	8	(Sweden) Alexander West	PA
(United Kingdom) Garage 59	McLaren 720S GT3 Evo	59	(United Kingdom) James Jakes	PA
(United Kingdom) Garage 59	McLaren 720S GT3 Evo	59	(Portugal) Miguel Ramos	PA
(United Kingdom) Garage 59	McLaren 720S GT3 Evo	59	(United Kingdom) Mark Sansom	PA
(Switzerland) Kessel Racing	Ferrari 296 GT3	11	(Turkey) Murat Cuhadaroglu	PA
(Switzerland) Kessel Racing	Ferrari 296 GT3	11	(Italy) David Fumanelli	PA
(Switzerland) Kessel Racing	Ferrari 296 GT3	11	(Italy) Davide Rigon	PA
(Switzerland) Kessel Racing	Ferrari 296 GT3	11	(Italy) Giorgio Roda	PA
(Switzerland) Kessel Racing	Ferrari 296 GT3	74	(United Kingdom) Andrew Gilbert	P
(Switzerland) Kessel Racing	Ferrari 296 GT3	74	(Spain) Fran Rueda	P
(Switzerland) Kessel Racing	Ferrari 296 GT3	74	(Thailand) Tanart Sathienthirakul	P
(Germany) Proton Huber Competition	Porsche 911 GT3 R (992)	16	Sergei Borisov (Note: Borisov, Salikhov, Stolyarov, Loboda and Remenyako are Russian, but they compete as neutral competitors as Russian national emblems were banned by the FIA following the Russian invasion of Ukraine.)	P
(Germany) Proton Huber Competition	Porsche 911 GT3 R (992)	16	(Germany) Sven Müller	P
(Germany) Proton Huber Competition	Porsche 911 GT3 R (992)	16	Sergey Stolyarov	P
(France) Saintéloc Racing	Audi R8 LMS Evo II	25	(Belgium) Gilles Magnus	P
(France) Saintéloc Racing	Audi R8 LMS Evo II	25	(Germany) Dennis Marschall	P
(France) Saintéloc Racing	Audi R8 LMS Evo II	25	(China) Bihuang Zhou	P
(France) Saintéloc Racing	Audi R8 LMS Evo II	26	(France) Michael Blanchemain	PA
(France) Saintéloc Racing	Audi R8 LMS Evo II	26	(France) Paul Evrard	PA
(France) Saintéloc Racing	Audi R8 LMS Evo II	26	(France) Jim Pla	PA
(France) Saintéloc Racing	Audi R8 LMS Evo II	26	(France) Benjamin Ricci	PA
(Slovakia) ARC Bratislava	Lamborghini Huracán GT3 Evo	44	(Slovakia) Adam Konôpka	Am
(Slovakia) ARC Bratislava	Lamborghini Huracán GT3 Evo	44	(Slovakia) Miro Konôpka	Am
(Slovakia) ARC Bratislava	Lamborghini Huracán GT3 Evo	44	(Australia) Neale Muston	Am
(Slovakia) ARC Bratislava	Lamborghini Huracán GT3 Evo	44	(Zimbabwe) Ameerth Naran	Am
(Italy) AF Corse	Ferrari 296 GT3	51	(Italy) Alessandro Cozzi	PA
(Italy) AF Corse	Ferrari 296 GT3	51	(Italy) Eliseo Donno	PA
(Italy) AF Corse	Ferrari 296 GT3	51	(Italy) Marco Pulcini	PA
(Italy) AF Corse	Ferrari 296 GT3	51	(Italy) Giorgio Sernagiotto	PA
(Germany) Rinaldi Racing	Ferrari 296 GT3	55	(Germany) Christian Hook	PA
(Germany) Rinaldi Racing	Ferrari 296 GT3	55	(Germany) Felipe Fernández Laser	PA
(Germany) Rinaldi Racing	Ferrari 296 GT3	55	(South Africa) David Perel	PA
(Germany) Rinaldi Racing	Ferrari 296 GT3	55	Rinat Salikhov	PA
(Italy) MP Racing	Mercedes-AMG GT3 Evo	58	(Italy) Corinna Gostner	Am
(Italy) MP Racing	Mercedes-AMG GT3 Evo	58	(Italy) David Gostner	Am
(Italy) MP Racing	Mercedes-AMG GT3 Evo	58	(Italy) Manuela Gostner	Am
(Italy) MP Racing	Mercedes-AMG GT3 Evo	58	(Italy) Thomas Gostner	Am
(United Kingdom) Optimum Motorsport	McLaren 720S GT3 Evo	69	(United States) Todd Coleman	P
(United Kingdom) Optimum Motorsport	McLaren 720S GT3 Evo	69	(Denmark) Frederik Schandorff	P
(United Kingdom) Optimum Motorsport	McLaren 720S GT3 Evo	69	(United States) Aaron Telitz	P
(South Africa) Into Africa Racing by Dragon Racing	Ferrari 296 GT3	77	(Canada) Ramez Azzam	PA
(South Africa) Into Africa Racing by Dragon Racing	Ferrari 296 GT3	77	(Zimbabwe) Axcil Jefferies	PA
(South Africa) Into Africa Racing by Dragon Racing	Ferrari 296 GT3	77	(South Africa) Xolile Letlaka	PA
(South Africa) Into Africa Racing by Dragon Racing	Ferrari 296 GT3	77	(Kuwait) Khaled Al Marzouq	PA
(United Arab Emirates) Dragon Racing	Ferrari 296 GT3	88	(United Kingdom) Matt Bell	P
(United Arab Emirates) Dragon Racing	Ferrari 296 GT3	88	(United Kingdom) Wayne Boyd	P
(United Arab Emirates) Dragon Racing	Ferrari 296 GT3	88	(United States) John Shauermann	P
(United Arab Emirates) Continental Racing with Simpson Motorsport	Audi R8 LMS Evo II	96	Mikhail Loboda	PA
(United Arab Emirates) Continental Racing with Simpson Motorsport	Audi R8 LMS Evo II	96	Denis Remenyako	PA
(United Arab Emirates) Continental Racing with Simpson Motorsport	Audi R8 LMS Evo II	96	(Cyprus) Vasily Vladykin	PA
(Germany) Lionspeed GP	Porsche 911 GT3 R (992)	99	(Germany) Patrick Kolb	PA
(Germany) Lionspeed GP	Porsche 911 GT3 R (992)	99	(United Arab Emirates) Bashar Mardini	PA
(Germany) Lionspeed GP	Porsche 911 GT3 R (992)	99	(Luxembourg) Gabriel Rindone	PA
(Germany) Lionspeed GP	Porsche 911 GT3 R (992)	99	(United Kingdom) Kyle Tilley	PA
992
(Italy) Enrico Fulgenzi Racing	Porsche 992 GT3 Cup	17	(Italy) Enrico Fulgenzi	
(Italy) Enrico Fulgenzi Racing	Porsche 992 GT3 Cup	17	(Italy) Alessandro Giannone	
(Italy) Enrico Fulgenzi Racing	Porsche 992 GT3 Cup	17	(Italy) Andrea Girondi	
(United Kingdom) Toro Verde GT	Porsche 992 GT3 Cup	42	(United Kingdom) Steve Laidlaw	
(United Kingdom) Toro Verde GT	Porsche 992 GT3 Cup	42	(United Kingdom) Steven Liquorish	
(United Kingdom) Toro Verde GT	Porsche 992 GT3 Cup	42	(United Kingdom) Graeme Mundy	
(United Kingdom) Toro Verde GT	Porsche 992 GT3 Cup	42	(United Kingdom) Micah Stanley	
(Qatar) QMMF by HRT Performance	Porsche 992 GT3 Cup	91	(Qatar) Ibrahim Al-Abdulghani	
(Qatar) QMMF by HRT Performance	Porsche 992 GT3 Cup	91	(Germany) Julian Hanses	
(Qatar) QMMF by HRT Performance	Porsche 992 GT3 Cup	91	(Qatar) Abdulla Al-Khelaifi	
(Qatar) QMMF by HRT Performance	Porsche 992 GT3 Cup	91	(Qatar) Ghanim Al-Maadheed	
(Germany) HRT Performance	Porsche 992 GT3 Cup	92	(Qatar) Ahmad Al Emadi	
(Germany) HRT Performance	Porsche 992 GT3 Cup	92	(China) Liang Jiatong	
(Germany) HRT Performance	Porsche 992 GT3 Cup	92	(Germany) Axel Sartingen	
(Germany) HRT Performance	Porsche 992 GT3 Cup	92	(Qatar) Jassim Al Thani	

Icon	Class
P	Pro Cup
PA	Pro-Am Cup
Am	Am Cup

== Qualifying ==
=== Qualifying results ===
Fastest times for each car are denoted in bold.
Pole positions in each class are denoted in bold.

Pos.	Class	No.	Team	Car	Avg. Time	Driver 1	Driver 2	Driver 3	Driver 4
1	Am	**7**	**(Germany) Herberth Motorsport**	**Porsche 911 GT3 R (992)**	**1:52.896**	**1:52.229**	1:52.854	1:53.607	
2	PA	**11**	**(Switzerland) Kessel Racing**	**Ferrari 296 GT3**	**1:53.027**	**1:51.163**	1:51.271	1:53.525	1:56.152
3	P	**16**	**(Germany) Proton Huber Competition**	**Porsche 911 GT3 R (992)**	**1:53.220**	1:54.527	1:52.950	**1:52.185**	
4	P	4	(Bahrain) 2 Seas - Grove Racing	Mercedes-AMG GT3 Evo	1:53.230	**1:51.281**	1:55.111	1:53.300	
5	P	74	(Switzerland) Kessel Racing	Ferrari 296 GT3	1:53.395	**1:51.822**	1:52.839	1:55.524	
6	PA	51	(Italy) AF Corse	Ferrari 296 GT3	1:53.448	1:54.142	1:53.627	1:53.418	**1:52.608**
7	P	25	(France) Saintéloc Racing	Audi R8 LMS Evo II	1:53.663	**1:51.587**	1:51.960	1:57.444	
8	P	69	(United Kingdom) Optimum Motorsport	McLaren 720S GT3 Evo	1:53.823	1:56.750	1:52.541	**1:52.180**	
9	PA	55	(Germany) Rinaldi Racing	Ferrari 296 GT3	1:53.842	**1:52.103**	1:52.761	1:54.548	1:55.956
10	PA	8	(United Kingdom) Garage 59	McLaren 720S GT3 Evo	1:53.906	**1:52.147**	1:52.260	1:55.338	1:55.879
11	P	88	(United Arab Emirates) Dragon Racing	Ferrari 296 GT3	1:54.041	**1:51.629**	1:52.630	1:57.866	
12	PA	59	(United Kingdom) Garage 59	McLaren 720S GT3 Evo	1:54.042	**1:52.580**	1:53.550	1:55.380	1:54.658
13	PA	6	(Germany) Racing One	Ferrari 296 GT3	1:54.195			1:55.434	**1:52.956**
14	PA	96	(United Arab Emirates) Continental Racing with Simpson Motorsport	Audi R8 LMS Evo II	1:54.311	1:54.034	**1:53.586**	1:55.315	
15	PA	26	(France) Saintéloc Racing	Audi R8 LMS Evo II	1:54.392		1:55.218	**1:53.821**	1:54.137
16	PA	99	(Germany) Lionspeed GP	Porsche 911 GT3 R (992)	1:54.486	**1:52.782**	1:53.580	1:55.155	1:56.427
17	Am	2	(Antigua and Barbuda) HAAS RT	Audi R8 LMS Evo II	1:54.767	1:52.950	**1:52.900**	1:56.002	1:57.219
18	PA	77	(South Africa) Into Africa Racing by Dragon Racing	Ferrari 296 GT3	1:54.929	**1:51.685**	1:52.855	1:55.770	1:59.409
19	992	**91**	**(Qatar) QMMF by HRT Performance**	**Porsche 992 GT3 Cup**	**1:57.840**	1:57.450	1:58.265	1:59.963	**1:55.684**
20	Am	44	(Slovakia) ARC Bratislava	Lamborghini Huracán GT3 Evo	1:57.972	1:56.464	**1:56.056**	1:58.216	2:01.152
21	992	17	(Italy) Enrico Fulgenzi Racing	Porsche 992 GT3 Cup	1:58.294	**1:56.053**	1:58.544	2:00.285	
22	Am	58	(Italy) MP Racing	Mercedes-AMG GT3 Evo	1:59.032	**1:55.580**	1:57.818	1:59.655	2:03.076
23	992	42	(United Kingdom) Toro Verde GT	Porsche 992 GT3 Cup	1:59.253	**1:56.428**	1:59.673	1:59.940	2:00.971
24	992	92	(Germany) HRT Performance	Porsche 992 GT3 Cup	2:00.870	**1:58.510**	2:01.720	2:00.712	2:02.538

== Race ==
Optimum Motorsport #69 crossed the line first however was given 2 drive-through penalties, which were converted to a 30 second post-race penalties each, due to being over the pit lane limit on exit on the last two stops (66.1 kph (41 mph) and 71.9 kph (44.7 mph) respectively, the limit was 60kph (37 mph)). This meant that the Saintéloc Racing #25 of Zhou Bihuang, Gilles Magnus and Dennis Marschall were promoted to the victory.

=== Results after 8 hours ===
Class leaders denoted in bold.

Pos.	Class	#	Team	Drivers	Car	Laps	Time/Gap/Retired
1	P	**25**	**(France) Saintéloc Racing**	**(Belgium) Gilles Magnus** **(Germany) Dennis Marschall** **(China) Bihuang Zhou**	**Audi R8 LMS Evo II**	**232**	**8:00:08.052**
2	P	69	(United Kingdom) Optimum Motorsport	(United States) Todd Coleman (Denmark) Frederik Schandorff (United States) Aaron Telitz	McLaren 720S GT3 Evo	232	+01:27.050
3	P	16	(Germany) Proton Huber Competition	Sergei Borisov (Germany) Sven Müller; Sergey Stolyarov	Porsche 911 GT3 R (992)	231	+1 Lap
4	Am	**7**	**(Germany) Herberth Motorsport**	**(United States) Dustin Blattner** **(Germany) Ralf Bohn** **(Germany) Alfred Renauer**	**Porsche 911 GT3 R (992)**	**231**	**+1 Lap**
5	PA	**59**	**(United Kingdom) Garage 59**	**(United Kingdom) James Jakes** **(Portugal) Miguel Ramos** **(United Kingdom) Mark Sansom**	**McLaren 720S GT3 Evo**	**230**	**+2 Laps**
6	PA	51	(Italy) AF Corse	(Italy) Alessandro Cozzi (Italy) Eliseo Donno (Italy) Marco Pulcini (Italy) Giorgio Sernagiotto	Ferrari 296 GT3	230	+2 Laps
7	PA	8	(United Kingdom) Garage 59	(Monaco) Louis Prette (Monaco) Philippe Prette (United Kingdom) Adam Smalley (Sweden) Alexander West	McLaren 720S GT3 Evo	230	+2 Laps
8	PA	26	(France) Saintéloc Racing	(France) Michael Blanchemain (France) Paul Evrard (France) Jim Pla (France) Benjamin Ricci	Audi R8 LMS Evo II	230	+2 Laps
9	PA	55	(Germany) Rinaldi Racing	(Germany) Christian Hook (Germany) Felipe Fernández Laser (South Africa) David Perel; Rinat Salikhov	Ferrari 296 GT3	230	+2 Laps
10	PA	11	(Switzerland) Kessel Racing	(Turkey) Murat Cuhadaroglu (Italy) David Fumanelli (Italy) Davide Rigon (Italy) Giorgio Roda	Ferrari 296 GT3	229	+3 Laps
11	Am	2	(Antigua and Barbuda) HAAS RT	(Australia) John Corbett (Belgium) Xavier Knauf (Belgium) Grégory Servais (United Kingdom) Casper Stevenson	Audi R8 LMS Evo II	228	+4 Laps
12	P	88	(United Arab Emirates) Dragon Racing	(United Kingdom) Matt Bell (United Kingdom) Wayne Boyd (United States) John Shauermann	Ferrari 296 GT3	228	+4 Laps
13	PA	96	(United Arab Emirates) Continental Racing with Simpson Motorsport	Mikhail Loboda; Denis Remenyako (Cyprus) Vasily Vladykin	Audi R8 LMS Evo II	227	+5 Laps
14	PA	99	(Germany) Lionspeed GP	(Germany) Patrick Kolb (United Arab Emirates) Bashar Mardini (Luxembourg) Gabriel Rindone (United Kingdom) Kyle Tilley	Porsche 911 GT3 R (992)	227	+5 Laps
15	PA	6	(Germany) Racing One	(Italy) Giacomo Altoè (Austria) Ernst Kirchmayr (Spain) Roberto Merhi (Australia) Mark Rosser	Ferrari 296 GT3	225	+7 Laps
16	P	74	(Switzerland) Kessel Racing	(United Kingdom) Andrew Gilbert (Spain) Fran Rueda (Thailand) Tanart Sathienthirakul	Ferrari 296 GT3	224	+8 Laps
17	992	**91**	**(Qatar) QMMF by HRT Performance**	**(Qatar) Ibrahim Al-Abdulghani** **(Germany) Julian Hanses** **(Qatar) Abdulla Al-Khelaifi** **(Qatar) Ghanim Al-Maadheed**	**Porsche 992 GT3 Cup**	**222**	**+10 Laps**
18	Am	58	(Italy) MP Racing	(Italy) Corinna Gostner (Italy) David Gostner (Italy) Manuela Gostner (Italy) Thomas Gostner	Mercedes-AMG GT3 Evo	219	+13 Laps
19	992	92	(Germany) HRT Performance	(Qatar) Ahmad Al Emadi (China) Liang Jiatong (Germany) Axel Sartingen (Qatar) Jassim Al Thani	Porsche 992 GT3 Cup	216	+16 Laps
20	992	17	(Italy) Enrico Fulgenzi Racing	(Italy) Enrico Fulgenzi (Italy) Alessandro Giannone (Italy) Andrea Girondi	Porsche 992 GT3 Cup	215	+17 Laps
21	P	4	(Bahrain) 2 Seas - Grove Racing	(Andorra) Jules Gounon (Australia) Brenton Grove (Australia) Stephen Grove	Mercedes-AMG GT3 Evo	211	+21 Laps
22	992	42	(United Kingdom) Toro Verde GT	(United Kingdom) Steve Laidlaw (United Kingdom) Steven Liquorish (United Kingdom) Graeme Mundy (United Kingdom) Micah Stanley	Porsche 992 GT3 Cup	186	+46 Laps
23	PA	77	(South Africa) Into Africa Racing by Dragon Racing	(Canada) Ramez Azzam (Zimbabwe) Axcil Jefferies (South Africa) Xolile Letlaka (Kuwait) Khaled Al Marzouq	Ferrari 296 GT3	180	Retired
24	Am	44	(Slovakia) ARC Bratislava	(Slovakia) Adam Konôpka (Slovakia) Miro Konôpka (Australia) Neale Muston (Zimbabwe) Ameerth Naran	Lamborghini Huracán GT3 Evo	120	Retired

=== Final results ===
Class winners denoted in bold.

Pos.	Class	#	Team	Drivers	Car	Laps	Time/Gap/Retired
1	P	**25**	**(France) Saintéloc Racing**	**(Belgium) Gilles Magnus** **(Germany) Dennis Marschall** **(China) Bihuang Zhou**	**Audi R8 LMS Evo II**	**353**	**12:01:01.083**
2	P	69	(United Kingdom) Optimum Motorsport	(United States) Todd Coleman (Denmark) Frederik Schandorff (United States) Aaron Telitz	McLaren 720S GT3 Evo	353	+55.873
3	P	16	(Germany) Proton Huber Competition	Sergei Borisov (Germany) Sven Müller; Sergey Stolyarov	Porsche 911 GT3 R (992)	352	+1 Lap
4	PA	**8**	**(United Kingdom) Garage 59**	**(Monaco) Louis Prette** **(Monaco) Philippe Prette** **(United Kingdom) Adam Smalley** **(Sweden) Alexander West**	**McLaren 720S GT3 Evo**	**351**	**+2 Laps**
5	PA	26	(France) Saintéloc Racing	(France) Michael Blanchemain (France) Paul Evrard (France) Jim Pla (France) Benjamin Ricci	Audi R8 LMS Evo II	350	+3 Laps
6	PA	11	(Switzerland) Kessel Racing	(Turkey) Murat Cuhadaroglu (Italy) David Fumanelli (Italy) Davide Rigon (Italy) Giorgio Roda	Ferrari 296 GT3	350	+3 Laps
7	PA	51	(Italy) AF Corse	(Italy) Alessandro Cozzi (Italy) Eliseo Donno (Italy) Marco Pulcini (Italy) Giorgio Sernagiotto	Ferrari 296 GT3	350	+3 Laps
8	Am	**7**	**(Germany) Herberth Motorsport**	**(United States) Dustin Blattner** **(Germany) Ralf Bohn** **(Germany) Alfred Renauer**	**Porsche 911 GT3 R (992)**	**349**	**+4 Laps**
9	PA	55	(Germany) Rinaldi Racing	(Germany) Christian Hook (Germany) Felipe Fernández Laser (South Africa) David Perel; Rinat Salikhov	Ferrari 296 GT3	349	+4 Laps
10	P	88	(United Arab Emirates) Dragon Racing	(United Kingdom) Matt Bell (United Kingdom) Wayne Boyd (United States) John Shauermann	Ferrari 296 GT3	348	+5 Laps
11	Am	2	(Antigua and Barbuda) HAAS RT	(Australia) John Corbett (Belgium) Xavier Knauf (Belgium) Grégory Servais (United Kingdom) Casper Stevenson	Audi R8 LMS Evo II	347	+6 Laps
12	PA	96	(United Arab Emirates) Continental Racing with Simpson Motorsport	Mikhail Loboda; Denis Remenyako (Cyprus) Vasily Vladykin	Audi R8 LMS Evo II	345	+8 Laps
13	PA	99	(Germany) Lionspeed GP	(Germany) Patrick Kolb (United Arab Emirates) Bashar Mardini (Luxembourg) Gabriel Rindone (United Kingdom) Kyle Tilley	Porsche 911 GT3 R (992)	345	+8 Laps
14	P	74	(Switzerland) Kessel Racing	(United Kingdom) Andrew Gilbert (Spain) Fran Rueda (Thailand) Tanart Sathienthirakul	Ferrari 296 GT3	342	+11 Laps
15	992	**91**	**(Qatar) QMMF by HRT Performance**	**(Qatar) Ibrahim Al-Abdulghani** **(Germany) Julian Hanses** **(Qatar) Abdulla Al-Khelaifi** **(Qatar) Ghanim Al-Maadheed**	**Porsche 992 GT3 Cup**	**337**	**+16 Laps**
16	PA	6	(Germany) Racing One	(Italy) Giacomo Altoè (Austria) Ernst Kirchmayr (Spain) Roberto Merhi (Australia) Mark Rosser	Ferrari 296 GT3	337	+16 Laps
17	P	4	(Bahrain) 2 Seas - Grove Racing	(Andorra) Jules Gounon (Australia) Brenton Grove (Australia) Stephen Grove	Mercedes-AMG GT3 Evo	331	+22 Laps
18	Am	58	(Italy) MP Racing	(Italy) Corinna Gostner (Italy) David Gostner (Italy) Manuela Gostner (Italy) Thomas Gostner	Mercedes-AMG GT3 Evo	329	+24 Laps
19	992	92	(Germany) HRT Performance	(Qatar) Ahmad Al Emadi (China) Liang Jiatong (Germany) Axel Sartingen (Qatar) Jassim Al Thani	Porsche 992 GT3 Cup	327	+26 Laps
20	992	42	(United Kingdom) Toro Verde GT	(United Kingdom) Steve Laidlaw (United Kingdom) Steven Liquorish (United Kingdom) Graeme Mundy (United Kingdom) Micah Stanley	Porsche 992 GT3 Cup	293	+60 Laps
21	992	17	(Italy) Enrico Fulgenzi Racing	(Italy) Enrico Fulgenzi (Italy) Alessandro Giannone (Italy) Andrea Girondi	Porsche 992 GT3 Cup	255	Retired
22	PA	59	(United Kingdom) Garage 59	(United Kingdom) James Jakes (Portugal) Miguel Ramos (United Kingdom) Mark Sansom	McLaren 720S GT3 Evo	253	Retired
23	PA	77	(South Africa) Into Africa Racing by Dragon Racing	(Canada) Ramez Azzam (Zimbabwe) Axcil Jefferies (South Africa) Xolile Letlaka (Kuwait) Khaled Al Marzouq	Ferrari 296 GT3	180	Retired
24	Am	44	(Slovakia) ARC Bratislava	(Slovakia) Adam Konôpka (Slovakia) Miro Konôpka (Australia) Neale Muston (Zimbabwe) Ameerth Naran	Lamborghini Huracán GT3 Evo	120	Retired
