= Dustin Blattner =

American racing driver (born 1986)

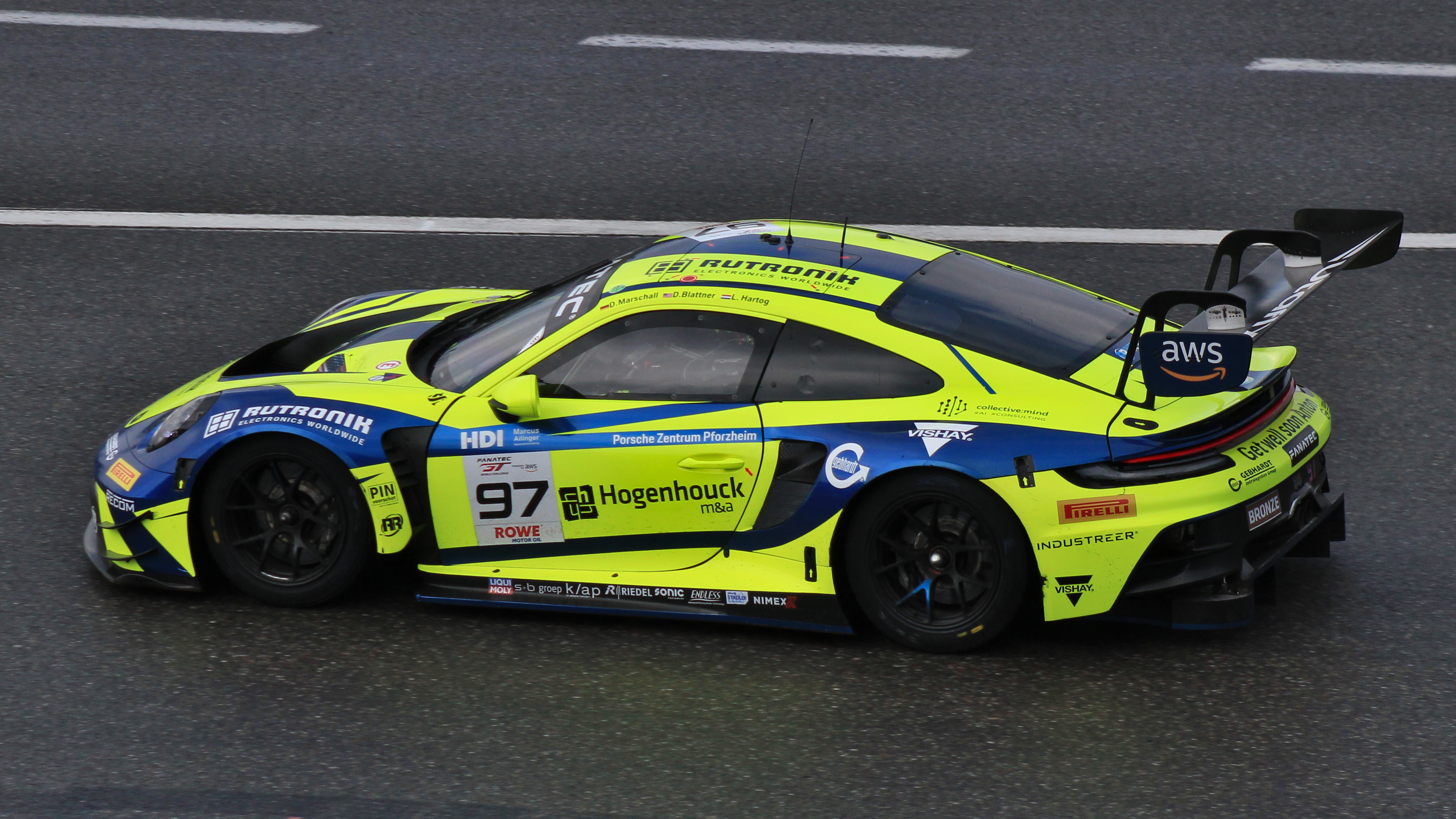
- Blattner in 2024
- Nationality: (United States) American
- Born: Dustin Scott Blattner; 20 February 1986 (age 40) Minnesota, U.S.
- Categorisation: FIA Bronze

Championship titles
- 2025–2026 2025–26 2025 2025 2023: GT World Challenge Europe Endurance Cup – Bronze; Asian Le Mans Series – GT; GT World Challenge Europe – Bronze; GT World Challenge Europe Sprint Cup – Bronze; Porsche Sprint Challenge Southern Europe – Club Division – Am

Dustin Scott Blattner (born 20 February 1986) is an American racing driver who last competed for Kessel Racing in GT World Challenge Europe.

== Career ==
Blattner made his car racing debut in 2023, racing in the Porsche Sprint Challenge Southern Europe for Enrico Fulgenzi Racing. In his only season in the series, Blattner won all four races he contested as he took the Club Division – Am title ahead of Josh Stanton. Later that year, Blattner made his GT3 debut by joining Porsche-fielding Car Collection Motorsport for the Gulf 12 Hours. Racing in the Am class, Blattner spent most of the race as the highest non-pro class runner and ended up finishing fifth overall and winning in class. Remaining in the Middle East for the final two rounds of the 2023–24 Middle East Trophy with the same team, Blattner won the 6 Hours of Abu Dhabi overall and finished sixth in the Dubai 24 Hour.

For the rest of 2024, Blattner joined Porsche-affiliated Rutronik Racing for a dual campaign in the Bronze class of the GT World Challenge Europe Endurance and Sprint Cups. In the former, Blattner scored his maiden class win at the Nürburgring before repeating the same feat two races later at Jeddah to end the year third in the Bronze Cup points. In the Sprint Cup, Blattner scored a lone class win at Magny-Cours en route to a third-place points finish in class. During 2024, Blattner also made a one-off appearance in the Italian GT Sprint Championship for Fach Auto Tech at Misano, taking a Pro-Am class win on debut. At the end of the year, Blattner made two one-off appearances for Porsche-fielding Herberth Motorsport, winning the 24 Hours of Barcelona on his debut with the team, and also winning the Gulf 12 Hours in the GT3 Am class for the second year in a row. Before the year was over, Blattner joined Ferrari-fielding Kessel Racing for the 2024–25 Asian Le Mans Series. Racing in the GT class, Blattner took his first podium by finishing third in race one at Dubai, before repeating the same feat three races later at Abu Dhabi to end the year fourth in points.

For the rest of the 2025, Blattner remained with Kessel Racing for the GT World Challenge Europe Endurance and Sprint Cups. In the Endurance Cup, Blattner won in class at Le Castellet and the 24 Hours of Spa to secure the Bronze Cup title at the end of the season. In the Sprint Cup, Blattner opened up the season by taking class wins at Zandvoort and Misano to take an early points lead. Two rounds later, Blattner took his highest overall finish of the season by finishing sixth in race one at Valencia, thus scoring another class win, which helped him secure the Bronze Cup title the following race as he took another class podium. During 2025, Blattner also competed in the Suzuka 1000 km for Harmony Racing, in which he finished eighth in class as the highest-placed Ferrari overall. At the end of the year, Blattner continued with Kessel Racing to compete in the 2025–26 Asian Le Mans Series, taking wins at Sepang and Dubai as he secured the GT title.

Following that, Blattner continued with Kessel Racing for another dual program in the GT World Challenge Europe Endurance and Sprint Cups. In the Endurance Cup, Blattner took class wins at Monza and the 24 Hours of Spa to clinch his second Bronze Cup title, after teammate Dennis Marschall was excluded from the standings by not being allowed to win the class title as a solo Platinum-rated driver. In the Sprint Cup, Blattner scored only two class podiums in a season hampered by an injury he picked up in race two at Magny-Cours, which caused him to miss the Barcelona finale. At the end of the year, Blattner moved to McLaren-affiliated Garage 59 to race in the GT3 class of the 2026–27 Asian Le Mans Series.

== Racing record ==
=== Racing career summary ===
Season	Series	Team	Races	Wins	Poles	F/Laps	Podiums	Points	Position
2023	Porsche Sprint Challenge Southern Europe – Club Division – Am	Enrico Fulgenzi Racing	4	4	1	2	4	106	**1st**
2023	Gulf 12 Hours – GT3 Am	Car Collection Motorsport	1	1	0	0	1	—N/a	**1st**
2023–24	Middle East Trophy – GT3 Pro-Am	Car Collection Motorsport	2	1	1	0	2	60	**2nd**
2024	GT World Challenge Europe Endurance Cup	Rutronik Racing	5	0	0	0	0	0	NC
2024	GT World Challenge Europe Endurance Cup – Bronze	Rutronik Racing	5	2	1	0	2	71	**3rd**
2024	GT World Challenge Europe Sprint Cup	Rutronik Racing	7	0	0	1	0	0	NC
2024	GT World Challenge Europe Sprint Cup – Bronze	Rutronik Racing	7	1	1	0	3	61.5	**3rd**
2024	Intercontinental GT Challenge	Rutronik Racing	1	0	0	0	0	0	NC
2024	Italian GT Sprint Championship – GT3 Pro-Am	Fach Auto Tech	2	1	1	0	1	32	NC
2024	24H Series – GT3 Am	Herberth Motorsport	1	1	1	1	1	60	9th
2024	Gulf 12 Hours – GT3 Am	Herberth Motorsport	1	1	0	0	1	—N/a	**1st**
2024–25	Asian Le Mans Series – GT	Kessel Racing	6	0	2	0	2	54	4th
2025	Middle East Trophy – GT3	Dragon Racing	1	0	0	0	0	0	NC
2025	GT World Challenge Europe Endurance Cup	Kessel Racing	5	0	0	0	0	0	NC
2025	GT World Challenge Europe Endurance Cup – Bronze	Kessel Racing	5	2	1	0	3	97	**1st**
2025	GT World Challenge Europe Sprint Cup	Kessel Racing	8	0	1	2	0	5.5	22nd
2025	GT World Challenge Europe Sprint Cup – Bronze	Kessel Racing	8	3	4	3	6	92	**1st**
2025	24H Series – GT3 Pro-Am	Kessel Racing	1	0	0	0	1	32	NC
2025	Intercontinental GT Challenge	Kessel Racing; Harmony Racing; Blattner Company by Herberth Motorsport	3	0	0	0	0	6	28th
2025	Suzuka 1000 km – Bronze	Harmony Racing	1	0	0	0	0	—N/a	8th
2025–26	Asian Le Mans Series – GT	Kessel Racing	6	2	0	0	3	94	**1st**
2025–26	24H Series Middle East - GT3	AlManar by Dragon	1	0	0	0	0	9	NC
2026	GT World Challenge Europe Endurance Cup	Kessel Racing	4	0	0	0	0	17	13th
2026	GT World Challenge Europe Endurance Cup – Bronze	Kessel Racing	4	2	1	0	2	97	**1st**
2026	Intercontinental GT Challenge	Kessel Racing	1	0	0	0	0	2	29th
2026	GT World Challenge Europe Sprint Cup	Kessel Racing	6	0	0	0	0	0	NC
2026	GT World Challenge Europe Sprint Cup – Bronze	Kessel Racing	6	0	0	2	2	35.5	8th
2026	24 Hours of Le Mans – LMGT3	Kessel Racing	1	0	0	0	0	—N/a	9th
2026–27	Asian Le Mans Series – GT3	Garage 59						*	*

=== Complete GT World Challenge Europe results ===
==== Complete GT World Challenge Europe Endurance Cup results ====
Year	Team	Car	Class	1	2	3	4	5	6	7	Pos.	Points
2024	Rutronik Racing	Porsche 911 GT3 R (992)	Bronze	LEC; 31	SPA; 6H; Ret	SPA; 12H; Ret	SPA; 24H; Ret	**NÜR**; 22	MNZ; 17	**JED**; 17	3rd	71
2025	Kessel Racing	Ferrari 296 GT3	Bronze	LEC; 26	MNZ; 29	SPA; 6H; 10	SPA; 12H; 16	SPA; 24H; 15	**NÜR**; Ret	CAT; 18	1st	97
2026	Kessel Racing	Ferrari 296 GT3 Evo	Bronze	LEC; 28	MNZ; 8	SPA; 6H; 14	SPA; 12H; 1	**SPA**; **24H**; 10	NÜR	ALG	1st	97

^{*} Season still in progress.

==== Complete GT World Challenge Europe Sprint Cup results ====
Year	Team	Car	Class	1	2	3	4	5	6	7	8	Pos.	Points
2024	Rutronik Racing	Porsche 911 GT3 R (992)	Bronze	MIS; 1 DNS	MIS; 2; 23	HOC; 1; 27	HOC; 2; 19	MAG; 1; 20	MAG; 2; 17	CAT; 1; 23	**CAT**; **2**; 16	3rd	61.5
2025	Kessel Racing	Ferrari 296 GT3	Bronze	ZAN; 1; 23	**ZAN**; **2**; 22	**MIS**; **1**; 15	**MIS**; **2**; 38	MAG; 1; 24	**MAG**; **2**; 24	**VAL**; **1**; 6	VAL; 2; 25	1st	92
2026	Kessel Racing	Ferrari 296 GT3 Evo	Bronze	MIS; 1; 24	MIS; 2; 34	MAG; 1; 23	MAG; 2 Ret	ZAN; 1; 38	ZAN; 2; 27	CAT; 1	CAT; 2	8th	35.5

=== Complete Asian Le Mans Series results ===
(key) (Races in bold indicate pole position) (Races in italics indicate fastest lap)

Year	Team	Class	Car	Engine	1	2	3	4	5	6	Pos.	Points
2024–25	Kessel Racing	GT	Ferrari 296 GT3	Ferrari F163 3.0 L Turbo V6	SEP; 1; 6	SEP; 2; 12	**DUB**; **1**; 3	**DUB**; **2**; 10	ABU; 1; 4	ABU; 2; 3	4th	54
2025–26	Kessel Racing	GT	Ferrari 296 GT3	Ferrari F163 3.0 L Turbo V6	SEP; 1; 5	SEP; 2; 1	DUB; 1; 1	DUB; 2; 4	ABU; 1; 3	ABU; 2; 9	1st	94
2026–27	Garage 59	GT	McLaren 720S GT3 Evo	McLaren M840T 4.0 L Turbo V8	LEC; 1; 18	LEC; 2; 1	JER; 1	JER; 2	ALG; 1	ALG; 2	3rd*	25*

=== Complete 24 Hours of Le Mans results ===
Year	Team	Co-Drivers	Car	Class	Laps	Pos.	Class Pos.
2026	(Switzerland) Kessel Racing	(Germany) Dennis Marschall (Italy) Lorenzo Patrese	Ferrari 296 GT3 Evo	LMGT3	334	41st	9th
