= Qatar Motor and Motorcycle Federation =

Auto racing sanctioning body in Qatar

- للاتحاد القطري للسيارات والدراجات النارية
- Sport: Motorsport
- Jurisdiction: Qatar
- Abbreviation: QMMF
- Founded: 21 July 1987
- Affiliation: FIA
- Headquarters: Lusail
- President: Abdulrahman bin Abdullatif al-Mannai

Official website
- qmmf.gov.qa
- (Qatar)

Qatar Motor and Motorcycle Federation (Arabic: للاتحاد القطري للسيارات والدراجات النارية, QMMF), founded in 1987, is one of the National Sporting Authorities affiliated with the Fédération Internationale de l'Automobile (FIA), with the aim of organising, regulating and developing motorsport in Qatar. The QMMF is currently under the supervision of the Ministry of Sports and Youth.

== History ==
The QMMF was created pursuant to the Decision of the Vice President of the Supreme Council for Youth Welfare No. (86) of 1407 AH, on 21 July 1987. In 2004, the Lusail International Circuit was constructed with support from the Federation and is where the QMMF is currently headquartered. In 2019, the Qatar Motorsports Academy (QMA) was founded by the QMMF, with karting and motorcycling training provided to Qatari and expatriates alike.

The Federation has expanded into sponsoring Qatari drivers to compete in major global events including the 24 Hours of Spa in 2025 and the 24 Hours of Le Mans in 2026.

In 2026, the QMMF and the Turkish Automobile Sports Federation (TOSFED) entered into a partnership to facilitate knowledge sharing, encompassing professional expertise in race operations, safety standards, and sustainable practices.

== Objectives ==
The QMMF has multiple objectives set forth by Minister of Sports and Youth Decision No. (19) of 2025:

- To promote and expand the practice of motor sports and motorcycle sports in the State of Qatar.
- To enhance the technical and organizational standards of these sports and to organize all related activities and competitions.
- To safeguard the integrity of motor and motorcycle sports in accordance with local and international regulations.
- To manage all technical and administrative aspects of the sports, serving as the sole authoritative body for them within the State.
- To collaborate with the international federations FIA and FIM, and to maintain the powers and recognitions granted by these organizations.
- To establish general standards for the development of the two sports and to work towards achieving excellence at the local and international levels.

== See also ==
- List of FIA member organisations
