= 24 Hours of Portimão =

Sports and touring car endurance race in Portugal

(Portugal) 24 Hours of Portimão

24H Series
- Venue: Algarve International Circuit
- First race: 2017
- First 24H GT race: 2017
- Last race: 2024
- Duration: 24 Hours
- Most wins (driver): (Czech Republic) Josef Král (3) (Italy) Matteo Malucelli (3) (Czech Republic) Jiří Písařík (3)
- Most wins (team): (Czech Republic) Bohemia Energy Racing with Scuderia Praha (3)
- Most wins (manufacturer): (Italy) Ferrari (3)

The 24 Hours of Portimão is both a sports car and touring car automobile endurance race held annually at the Algarve International Circuit. It was inaugurated in 2017. The race is currently part of 24H GT Series and Touring Car Endurance Series.

== Entrants and participants ==
As with all races in the 24H Series, promoted by Dutch promoter Creventic, they are open to both professional and semi-professional teams. The races are contested with GT3-spec cars, GT4-spec cars, sports cars, touring cars and 24H-Specials, like silhouette cars.

== History ==
The first race took part in 2017 as part of 2017 24H Series, the 3rd season with FIA status. Since 2018 the race became also part of Touring Car Endurance Series, and in that same year was part of 2018 24H Proto Series. The 2021 race was cancelled due to COVID-19. The race was not included into the 2023 24H GT Series calendar, however in September 2023, it was announced that the race returned in 2024.

== Race winners ==
Year	Drivers	Team	Car	Laps	Race time	Fastest lap	Reference
2024	(Germany) Max Moritz (Germany) Vincent Kolb (Germany) Robert Renauer (Austria) Felix Neuhofer (Germany) Ralf Bohn	(Germany) Herberth Motorsport	Porsche 911 GT3 R (992)	743	24:00:24.258	1:43.654	
2023	Not held						
2022	(United States) Charles Putman (United States) Charles Espenlaub (United States) Joe Foster (United States) Shane Lewis	(United States) CP Racing	Mercedes-AMG GT3	718	24:01.57.232	1:43.087	
2021	Race cancelled due to Covid-19						
2020	(Germany) Jürgen Häring (Germany) Michael Joos (Greece) Taki Konstantinou (Germany) Tim Müller (Germany) Marco Seefried	(Germany) Herberth Motorsport	Porsche 911 GT3 R (2019)	731	24:01:23.179	1:45.206	
2019	(Czech Republic) Josef Král (Italy) Matteo Malucelli (Czech Republic) Jiří Písařík	(Czech Republic) No. 11 Bohemia Energy Racing with Scuderia Praha	Ferrari 488 GT3	721	24:00:41.552	1:45.656	
2018	(Czech Republic) Josef Král (Italy) Matteo Malucelli (Czech Republic) Jiří Písařík	(Czech Republic) No. 11 Bohemia Energy Racing with Scuderia Praha	Ferrari 488 GT3	586	24:00:46.170	1:45.651	
2017	(Czech Republic) Josef Král (Italy) Matteo Malucelli (Czech Republic) Jiří Písařík	(Czech Republic) No. 11 Scuderia Praha	Ferrari 488 GT3	722	24:00:46.488	1:45.732	

== Manufacturer title wins ==
Wins	Manufacturer	Year(s)	Team	Year(s)
3	(Italy) Ferrari	2017, 2018, 2019	(Czech Republic) Scuderia Praha	2017, 2018, 2019
2	(Germany) Porsche	2020, 2024	(Germany) Herberth Motorsport	2020, 2024
1	(Germany) Mercedes-AMG	2022	(United States) CP Racing	2022

== See also ==
- 24H Series
- Touring Car Endurance Series
