= Julian Hanses =

German racing driver

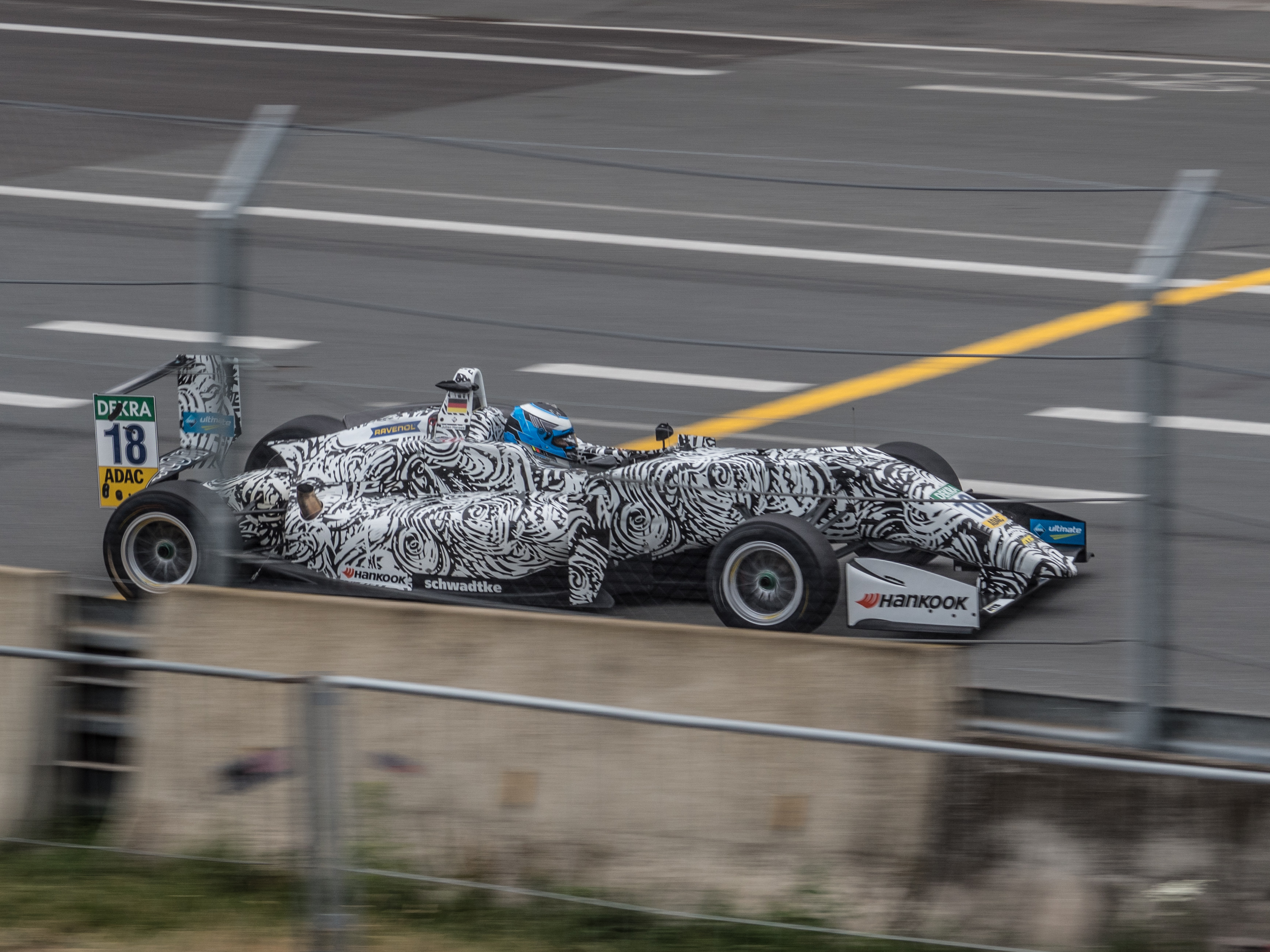
- Hanses at the Norisring in 2018
- Nationality: German
- Born: 31 August 1997 (age 29) Hilden, Germany

ADAC GT4 Germany career
- Debut season: 2022
- Current team: CV Performance Group
- Categorisation: FIA Silver
- Car number: 85
- Starts: 12 (12 entries)
- Wins: 0
- Podiums: 3
- Poles: 0
- Fastest laps: 0
- Best finish: 6th in 2022

Previous series
- 2020-2021 2020 2019 2018 2016-2017 2016: Porsche Carrera Cup Germany; Porsche Supercup; Euroformula Open Championship; FIA Formula 3 European Championship; ADAC Formula 4 Championship; Toyota Racing Series

Julian Hanses (born 31 August 1997 in Hilden) is a racing driver from Germany. He currently competes in the Porsche Carrera Cup Germany.

== Racing record ==
=== Career summary ===
Season	Series	Team	Races	Wins	Poles	F/Laps	Podiums	Points	Position
2016	Toyota Racing Series	Victory Motor Racing	15	0	0	0	0	226	19th
2016	ADAC Formula 4 Championship	Team Timo Scheider	24	0	0	0	0	0	35th
2017	ADAC Formula 4 Championship	US Racing	21	1	3	1	2	82	11th
2018	FIA Formula 3 European Championship	ma-con	15	0	0	0	0	7	19th
2018	FIA Formula 3 European Championship	Carlin	6	0	0	0	0	7	19th
2019	Euroformula Open Championship	Team Motopark	12	0	1	0	4	98	8th
2020	Porsche Carrera Cup Germany	Förch Racing	11	0	0	0	0	106	5th
2020	Porsche Supercup	Lechner Racing Middle East	4	0	0	0	0	0	NC
2020	Porsche Sprint Challenge Middle East	Lechner Racing Middle East	9	1	0	0	2	170	4th
2021	Porsche Carrera Cup Germany	HRT Performance	16	0	0	0	1	108	9th
2022	ADAC GT4 Germany	CV Performance Group	12	0	0	0	3	100	6th
2022-23	Middle East Trophy - 992	QMMF Racing by HRT Thuraya Qatar	2	0	0	0	0	40	7th
2023	24H GT Series - 992	HRT Performance	1	0	0	0	0	0	NC†
2023-24	Middle East Trophy - 992	QMMF by HRT Suhail Qatar	2	0	0	0	2	72	**2nd**
2024	ADAC GT Masters	Schnitzelalm Racing	2	0	0	0	1	0	NC†
2024	International GT Open	Team Motopark	2	0	0	1	1	20	20th
2024	24H Series - 992	QMMF by HRT	1	0	0	0	1	54	16th
2024	992 Endurance Cup	QMMF by HRT	1	0	0	0	0	N/A	8th
2024	Gulf 12 Hours - 992	QMMF by HRT	1	1	1	0	1	N/A	**1st**
2025	Middle East Trophy - 992	QMMF by HRT Suhail Qatar	2	0	0	0	1	46	**1st**
2025	ADAC GT Masters	FK Performance Motorsport	12	0	0	0	1	117	9th
2025	GT World Challenge Europe Endurance Cup	QMMF by Saintéloc Racing	2	0	0	0	0	0	NC
2025	GT World Challenge Europe Sprint Cup	QMMF by Saintéloc Racing	2	0	0	0	0	0	NC
2025	GT World Challenge Europe Sprint Cup - Bronze	QMMF by Saintéloc Racing	2	0	0	0	0	3.5	21st
2025	24H Series - 992	Mühlner Motorsport	4	2	?	?	2	140	4th
2025-26	24H Series Middle East - GT3	Team WRT	1	0	?	?	1	0	NC†
2026	European Le Mans Series - LMGT3	Team Qatar by Iron Lynx	6	1	4	0	3	78	**3rd**
2026	24 Hours of Le Mans - LMGT3	Team Qatar by Iron Lynx	1	0	0	0	0	N/A	16th
2026	24H Series - 992	Mühlner Motorsport							
2026	24H Series - 992	QMMF by HRT Performance							
2026-27	Asian Le Mans Series - GT3	Team Qatar by Iron Lynx							

^{†} As Hanses was a guest driver, he was ineligible to score points. *Season still in progress.

=== Complete Toyota Racing Series results ===
(key) (Races in bold indicate pole position) (Races in italics indicate fastest lap)

Year	Team	1	2	3	4	5	6	7	8	9	10	11	12	13	14	15	DC	Points
2016	Victory Motor Racing	RUA; 1; 15	RUA; 2; 15	RUA; 3 Ret	TER; 1 Ret	TER; 2; 15	TER; 3; 12	HMP; 1; 14	HMP; 2; 16	HMP; 3 Ret	TAU; 1 Ret	TAU; 2 Ret	TAU; 3; 16	MAU; 1; 13	MAU; 2; 19	MAU; 3; 12	19th	226

=== Complete ADAC Formula 4 Championship results ===
(key) (Races in bold indicate pole position) (Races in italics indicate fastest lap)

Year	Team	1	2	3	4	5	6	7	8	9	10	11	12	13	14	15	16	17	18	19	20	21	22	23	24	Pos	Points
2016	Team Timo Scheider	OSC1; 1; 29	OSC1; 2; 21	OSC1; 3; 23	SAC; 1; 29	SAC; 2; 19	SAC; 3; 24	LAU; 1 Ret	LAU; 2; 23	LAU; 3 Ret	OSC2; 1; 16	OSC2; 2; 27	OSC2; 3; 17	RBR; 1; 23	RBR; 2; 26	RBR; 3; 18	NÜR; 1; 27	NÜR; 2; 26	NÜR; 3 Ret	ZAN; 1; 12	ZAN; 2 Ret	ZAN; 3; 12	HOC; 1; 29	HOC; 2; 26	HOC; 3; 21	35th	0
2017	US Racing	OSC1; 1; 6	OSC1; 2; 12	OSC1; 3; 7	LAU; 1 DSQ	**LAU**; **2** DSQ	LAU; 3 DSQ	RBR; 1; 13	RBR; 2; 10	RBR; 3; 8	OSC2; 1; 27	OSC2; 2; 15	OSC2; 3; 19	NÜR; 1; 9	NÜR; 2; 5	NÜR; 3; 2	**SAC**; **1**; 1	**SAC**; **2** Ret	SAC; 3 Ret	HOC; 1; 16	HOC; 2; 5	HOC; 3; 13				11th	82

=== Complete FIA Formula 3 European Championship results ===
(key) (Races in bold indicate pole position) (Races in italics indicate fastest lap)

Year	Team	Engine	1	2	3	4	5	6	7	8	9	10	11	12	13	14	15	16	17	18	19	20	21	22	23	24	25	26	27	28	29	30	Pos	Points
2018	ma-con	Volkswagen	PAU; 1; 13	PAU; 2; 7	PAU; 3; 18	HUN; 1 Ret	HUN; 2; 21	HUN; 3; 20	NOR; 1; 20	NOR; 2; 17	NOR; 3; 12	ZAN; 1; 21	ZAN; 2; 16	ZAN; 3 Ret	SPA; 1; 17	SPA; 2; 18	SPA; 3; 23	SIL; 1 WD	SIL; 2 WD	SIL; 3 WD	MIS; 1	MIS; 2	MIS; 3	NÜR; 1	NÜR; 2	NÜR; 3							19th	7
2018	Carlin	Volkswagen																									RBR; 1; 20	RBR; 2; 14	RBR; 3; 19	HOC; 1; 11	HOC; 2 Ret	HOC; 3; 13	19th	7

=== Complete Euroformula Open Championship results ===
(key) (Races in bold indicate pole position) (Races in italics indicate fastest lap)

Year	Team	1	2	3	4	5	6	7	8	9	10	11	12	13	14	15	16	17	18	Pos	Points
2019	Team Motopark	LEC; 1; 7	LEC; 2; 10	PAU; 1; 2	**PAU**; **2** Ret	HOC; 1; 6	HOC; 2; 3	SPA; 1; 5	SPA; 2; 3	HUN; 1; 17	HUN; 2 Ret	RBR; 1; 7	RBR; 2; 2	SIL; 1	SIL; 2	CAT; 1	CAT; 2	MNZ; 1	MNZ; 2	8th	98

=== Complete Porsche Carrera Cup Germany results ===
(key) (Races in bold indicate pole position) (Races in italics indicate fastest lap)

Year	Team	1	2	3	4	5	6	7	8	9	10	11	12	13	14	15	16	DC	Points
2020	Förch Racing	LMS; 4	SAC; 1; 6	SAC; 2; 4	SAC; 3; 4	RBR; 1; 4	RBR; 2; 8	RBR; 3; 11	LAU; 1; 4	LAU; 2; 9	OSC; 1; 5	OSC; 2; 5						5th	106
2021	HRT Performance	SPA; 1; 11	SPA; 2; 13	OSC; 1; 7	OSC; 2; 8	RBR; 1; 8	RBR; 2; 4	MNZ1; 1; 14	MNZ1; 2; 9	ZAN; 1; 7	ZAN; 2; 12	MNZ2; 1; 9	MNZ2; 2; 19	SAC; 1; 3	SAC; 2; 11	HOC; 1; 13	HOC; 2; 11	9th	108

=== Complete ADAC GT4 Germany results ===
(key) (Races in bold indicate pole position) (Races in italics indicate fastest lap)

Year	Team	Car	1	2	3	4	5	6	7	8	9	10	11	12	Pos	Points
2022	CV Performance Group	Mercedes-AMG GT4	OSC1; 1 Ret	OSC1; 2; 14	RBR; 1; 4	RBR; 2 Ret	ZAN; 1; 3	ZAN; 2; 3	NÜR; 1; 7	NÜR; 2; 4	SAC; 1; 2	SAC; 2; 11	HOC; 1; 13	HOC; 2; 14	6th	100

=== Complete ADAC GT Masters results ===
(key) (Races in bold indicate pole position) (Races in italics indicate fastest lap)

Year	Team	Car	1	2	3	4	5	6	7	8	9	10	11	12	DC	Points
2024	Schnitzelalm Racing	Mercedes-AMG GT3 Evo	OSC; 1	OSC; 2	ZAN; 1	ZAN; 2	NÜR; 1; 3	NÜR; 2; 4	SPA; 1	SPA; 2	RBR; 1	RBR; 2	HOC; 1	HOC; 2	NC†	0
2025	FK Performance Motorsport	BMW M4 GT3 Evo	LAU; 1; 9^{3}	LAU; 2; 6	ZAN; 1; 4	ZAN; 2; 2	NÜR; 1; 12	NÜR; 2; 6	SAL; 1; 10	SAL; 2; 5	RBR; 1; 9	RBR; 2; 12^{2}	HOC; 1; 11^{3}	HOC; 2; 6	9th	117

=== Complete GT World Challenge Europe results ===
==== GT World Challenge Europe Endurance Cup ====
(key) (Races in bold indicate pole position) (Races in italics indicate fastest lap)

Year	Team	Car	Class	1	2	3	4	5	6	7	Pos.	Points
2025	QMMF by Saintéloc Racing	Audi R8 LMS Evo II	Bronze	LEC	MNZ	SPA; 6H; 65	SPA; 12H; 58	SPA; 24H; 46	NÜR	CAT; 28	32nd	8

==== GT World Challenge Europe Sprint Cup ====
(key) (Races in bold indicate pole position) (Races in italics indicate fastest lap)

Year	Team	Car	Class	1	2	3	4	5	6	7	8	Pos.	Points
2025	QMMF by Saintéloc Racing	Audi R8 LMS Evo II	Bronze	ZAN; 1	ZAN; 2	MIS; 1	MIS; 2	MAG; 1	MAG; 2	VAL; 1; 28	VAL; 2; 31	21st	3.5

=== Complete European Le Mans Series results ===
(key) (Races in bold indicate pole position; races in italics indicate fastest lap)

Year	Entrant	Class	Chassis	Engine	1	2	3	4	5	6	Rank	Points
2026	Team Qatar by Iron Lynx	LMGT3	Mercedes-AMG GT3 Evo	Mercedes-AMG M159 6.2 L V8	**CAT**; 4	**LEC**; Ret	IMO; 2	SPA; 3	**SIL**; 1	**ALG**; 8	3rd	78

=== Complete 24 Hours of Le Mans results ===
Year	Team	Co-Drivers	Car	Class	Laps	Pos.	Class Pos.
2026	Team Qatar by Iron Lynx	(Qatar) Abdulla Al-Khelaifi (France) Giuliano Alesi	Mercedes-AMG GT3 Evo	LMGT3	324	48th	16th

=== Complete Asian Le Mans Series results ===
(key) (Races in bold indicate pole position; results in italics indicate fastest lap)

Year	Entrant	Class	Chassis	Engine	1	2	3	4	5	6	Rank	Points
2026–27	Team Qatar by Iron Lynx	GT	Mercedes-AMG GT3 Evo	Mercedes-AMG M159 6.2 L V8	LEC; 1; 1	LEC; 2; 5	JER; 1	JER; 2	ALG; 1	ALG; 2	1st*	35*
