= 24 Hours of Barcelona =

Sports car endurance race in Spain

(Spain) 24 Hours of Barcelona

24H Series
- Venue: Circuit de Barcelona-Catalunya
- First race: 1998
- First 24H GT race: 2011
- Last race: 2026
- Duration: 24 Hours
- Most wins (manufacturer): (Germany) Porsche (6)

The 24 Hours of Barcelona (Spanish: 24 Horas de Barcelona) is an endurance motor race held annually in September at the Circuit de Barcelona-Catalunya since 1998. It is considered to be the most important endurance event in Spain and since 2011 it has been co-organized by Creventic, the Dutch company that organizes the 24H Series.

== Winners ==
Year	Drivers	Car	Team	Remarks
1998	(Spain) Francesc Gutiérrez (Spain) Javier Buch (Spain) Pau Romero (Spain) Santiago Puig	BMW M3	(Spain) Gamace MC Competició	918 laps. First running of the event. National circuit layout.
1999	(Spain) Albert Roquet (Spain) Lluís Umbert (Spain) Ramón Naqui (Spain) Pasqual Germán	Honda Civic	(Spain) Escudería GM-R	881 laps.
2000	(Spain) Carles Villarrubí (Spain) Joaquim Folch (Spain) Jordi Gené (Spain) Jordi Serra	Volkswagen Golf	(Spain) Superwagen Philips 1	598 laps. Run on the newly reconfigured Grand Prix Circuit layout.
2001	(Spain) Carlos Palau (Spain) Carles Villarrubí (Spain) Joaquim Folch (Spain) Jordi Gené	Volkswagen Golf	(Spain) RACC	589 laps.
2002	(Spain) Anselm Llovera (Spain) Enric Codony (Spain) Jordi Codony (Spain) Òscar Nogués	Clio RS 2.0 16V	(Spain) Team Codony Sport	610 laps.
2003	(Spain) Anselm Llovera (Spain) Enric Codony (Spain) Jordi Codony (Spain) Òscar Nogués	Clio RS 2.0 16V	(Spain) Team Codony Sport	595 laps.
2004	(Spain) Jordi Nogués (Spain) Òscar Nogués (Spain) Sergi Ruiz	Clio RS 2.0 16V	(Spain) Pujolar Racing Volimes Sintec	625 laps. 2004 Grand Prix layout.
2005	(Spain) Luis Pérez-Sala (Andorra) Manel Cerqueda Jr. (Andorra) Manel Cerqueda Sr. (Spain) Marcel Costa	Seat León Cupra-R (MK1)	(Spain) Baporo Motorsport Nostrum	643 laps.
2006	(Spain) Alfredo Palencia (Spain) Antonio Puig (Spain) Eduardo Balcázar	SEAT León Supercopa (MK2)	(Spain) Zener Racing Team	644 laps.
2007	(Spain) Albert Vilanova (Spain) Cristian Cano (Spain) Dani Vilanova	SEAT León Supercopa (MK2)	(Spain) Gevicar	616 laps. 2007 Grand Prix layout.
2008	(Spain) Alfredo Palencia (Spain) Antonio Puig (Spain) Eduardo Balcázar (Spain) Francesc Gutiérrez	SEAT León Supercopa (MK2)	(Spain) Zener Racing Team	638 laps.
2009	(Spain) Borja Veiga (Spain) Ferrán Monje (Spain) Manuel Sáez Merino Jr. (Spain) Òscar Nogués	SEAT León Supercopa (MK2)	(Spain) Sunred Seven	649 laps. Òscar Nogués wins a record four races.
2010	Race cancelled			
2011	(Sweden) Edward Sandtröm (Sweden) Lars Stugemo (Denmark) Michael Outzen (Germany) Peter Posavac	BMW Z4 GT3	(Germany) Schubert Motorsport	669 laps. First event organized by Creventic.
2012	(United Kingdom) Adam Christodoulou (Netherlands) Klaas Hummel (United Kingdom) Phil Quaife (United Kingdom) Tim Mullen	McLaren MP4-12C GT3	(Netherlands) Lapidus Racing	640 laps.
2013	(Netherlands) Christiaan Frankenhout (Germany) Kenneth Heyer (Switzerland) Michael Kroll (Switzerland) Roland Eggimann	Mercedes SLS AMG	(Switzerland) Hofor Racing	605 laps.
2014	(Czech Republic) Jaromir Jirík (Czech Republic) Jiří Písařík (Italy) Matteo Malucelli (Netherlands) Peter Kox	Ferrari 458 GT3	(Czech Republic) Scuderia Praha	653 laps.
2015	(Germany) Bernd Schneider (Austria) Hari Proczyk (Germany) Reinhold Renger (United States) Sean Johnston	Mercedes SLS AMG	(Austria) HP Racing	662 laps.
2016	(Germany) Alfred Renauer (Switzerland) Daniel Allemann (Germany) Ralf Bohn (Germany) Robert Renauer	Porsche 911 GT3 R	(Germany) Precote Herberth Motorsport	662 laps.
2017	(Spain) Iván Pareras (Spain) Marc de Fulgencio (France) Maxime Guillemat (Russia) Nikolay Dmitriev (Spain) Nil Montserrat	Ginetta G55 GT4	(Spain) NM Racing Team	643 laps.
2018	(Germany) Alfred Renauer (Switzerland) Daniel Allemann (Germany) Ralf Bohn (Australia) Matt Campbell	Porsche 911 GT3 R	(Germany) Herberth Motorsport	677 laps.
2019	(Switzerland) Adrian Amstutz (Denmark) Dennis Lind (Russia) Leonid Machitski (Finland) Patrick Kujala	Lamborghini Huracán GT3	(United Kingdom) Barwell Motorsport	690 laps.
2020	Race cancelled			
2021	(Germany) Alfred Renauer (Switzerland) Daniel Allemann (Germany) Ralf Bohn (Germany) Robert Renauer	Porsche 911 GT3 R	(Germany) Herberth Motorsport	695 laps. 2021 Grand Prix Layout. Herbeth Motorsport sets record for wins.
2022	(Germany) Daniel Keilwitz (Germany) George Weiss (Netherlands) Indy Dontje (Germany) Leonard Weiss (Argentina) Nicolás Varrone	Ferrari 488 GT3	(Germany) WTM Racing	696 laps.
2023	(France) Julien Andlauer (France) Grégory Guilvert (France) Laurent Hurgon (France) Simon Tirman	Porsche 911 GT3 R (992)	(France) IMSA LS Group Performance	725 laps.
2024	(United States) Scott Noble (Germany) Ralf Bohn (United States) Jason Hart (United States) Dustin Blattner	Porsche 911 GT3 R (992)	(Germany) Herberth Motorsport	738 laps. Ralf Bohn ties the record for most wins as a driver. Current lap record on Grand Prix layouts.
2025	(Switzerland) Michael Kroll (Switzerland) Chantal Prinz (Germany) Alexander Prinz (Germany) Maximilian Partl (Germany) Torsten Kratz	Mercedes AMG GT3 Evo	(Switzerland) HOFOR Racing	733 laps.
2026	(Germany) Fabio Grosse (Germany) Tim Heinemann (Ukraine) Oleksiy Kikireshko (Germany) Alfred Renauer	Porsche 911 GT3 R (992.2)	(Germany) Up2Race	741 laps. Alfred Renauer ties the record for most wins as a driver.
