= 2023–24 Middle East Trophy =

Motor racing competition

The 2023–24 Middle East Trophy was the second season of the Middle East Trophy, presented by Creventic. The races are contested with GT3-spec cars, GT4-spec cars, sports cars, 24H-Specials, like silhouette cars, TCR Touring Cars, TCX cars and TC cars.

== Calendar ==
The provisional calendar was released on 11 October 2023, featuring three rounds. On 27 December 2023, a change to the schedule was announced, the Dubai 24 Hour becoming the season finale, due to shipping issues in the Bab El Mandab Strait. Due to the rescheduling, eight entries withdrew from the event.

Round	Event	Circuit	Location	Date	Map of circuit locations
1	12 Hours of Kuwait	Kuwait Motor Town	Ali Sabah Al Salem, Kuwait	7–9 December 2023	2023–24 Middle East Trophy is located in Persian Gulf
2	6 Hours of Abu Dhabi	(United Arab Emirates) Yas Marina Circuit	Abu Dhabi, United Arab Emirates	19–21 January 2024	2023–24 Middle East Trophy is located in Persian Gulf
3	Dubai 24 Hour	(United Arab Emirates) Dubai Autodrome	Dubai, United Arab Emirates	26–28 January 2024	2023–24 Middle East Trophy is located in Persian Gulf

== Teams and drivers ==
Team	Car	Engine	No.	Drivers	Class	Rounds
GT3
(Germany) racing one	Ferrari 296 GT3	Ferrari F163 3.0 L Turbo V6	6	(Italy) Giacomo Altoè	PA	3
(Germany) racing one	Ferrari 296 GT3	Ferrari F163 3.0 L Turbo V6	6	(Germany) Stefan Aust	PA	3
(Germany) racing one	Ferrari 296 GT3	Ferrari F163 3.0 L Turbo V6	6	(Germany) Steffen Görig	PA	3
(Germany) racing one	Ferrari 296 GT3	Ferrari F163 3.0 L Turbo V6	6	(Italy) Marco Pulcini	PA	3
(Germany) racing one	Ferrari 296 GT3	Ferrari F163 3.0 L Turbo V6	6	(Netherlands) Thierry Vermeulen	PA	3
(Germany) GetSpeed Performance	Mercedes-AMG GT3 Evo	Mercedes-AMG M159 6.2 L V8	9	(Oman) Al Faisal Al Zubair	P	3
(Germany) GetSpeed Performance	Mercedes-AMG GT3 Evo	Mercedes-AMG M159 6.2 L V8	9	(United States) Anthony Bartone	P	3
(Germany) GetSpeed Performance	Mercedes-AMG GT3 Evo	Mercedes-AMG M159 6.2 L V8	9	(Austria) Martin Konrad	P	3
(Germany) GetSpeed Performance	Mercedes-AMG GT3 Evo	Mercedes-AMG M159 6.2 L V8	9	(Germany) Fabian Schiller	P	3
(Germany) GetSpeed Performance	Mercedes-AMG GT3 Evo	Mercedes-AMG M159 6.2 L V8	9	(Germany) Luca Stolz	P	3
(Australia) EBM – Grove Racing	Mercedes-AMG GT3 Evo	Mercedes-AMG M159 6.2 L V8	10	(Australia) Brenton Grove	PA	2–3
(Australia) EBM – Grove Racing	Mercedes-AMG GT3 Evo	Mercedes-AMG M159 6.2 L V8	10	(Australia) Stephen Grove	PA	2–3
(Australia) EBM – Grove Racing	Mercedes-AMG GT3 Evo	Mercedes-AMG M159 6.2 L V8	10	(Australia) Jordan Love	PA	2–3
(Australia) EBM – Grove Racing	Mercedes-AMG GT3 Evo	Mercedes-AMG M159 6.2 L V8	10	(United Kingdom) Phil Keen	PA	3
(Australia) EBM – Grove Racing	Mercedes-AMG GT3 Evo	Mercedes-AMG M159 6.2 L V8	10	(New Zealand) Matthew Payne	PA	3
(United Kingdom) Race Lab	McLaren 720S GT3 Evo	McLaren M840T 4.0 L Turbo V8	13	(United Kingdom) Euan Hankey	PA	2
(United Kingdom) Race Lab	McLaren 720S GT3 Evo	McLaren M840T 4.0 L Turbo V8	13	(United Kingdom) James Kell	PA	2
(United Kingdom) Race Lab	McLaren 720S GT3 Evo	McLaren M840T 4.0 L Turbo V8	13	(United Kingdom) Lucky Khera	PA	2
(United Kingdom) Race Lab	McLaren 720S GT3 Evo	McLaren M840T 4.0 L Turbo V8	13	(United States) Thomas Surgent	PA	2
(United Kingdom) Century Motorsport	BMW M4 GT3	BMW S58B30T0 3.0 L Turbo V8	14	(Indonesia) Sean Gelael	Am	3
(United Kingdom) Century Motorsport	BMW M4 GT3	BMW S58B30T0 3.0 L Turbo V8	14	(Australia) Michael Johnston	Am	3
(United Kingdom) Century Motorsport	BMW M4 GT3	BMW S58B30T0 3.0 L Turbo V8	14	(United Kingdom) Darren Leung	Am	3
(United Kingdom) Century Motorsport	BMW M4 GT3	BMW S58B30T0 3.0 L Turbo V8	14	(United Kingdom) Christopher Salkeld	Am	3
(United Kingdom) Century Motorsport	BMW M4 GT3	BMW S58B30T0 3.0 L Turbo V8	22	(United Kingdom) Jack Barlow	PA	All
(United Kingdom) Century Motorsport	BMW M4 GT3	BMW S58B30T0 3.0 L Turbo V8	22	(United Kingdom) Carl Cavers	PA	All
(United Kingdom) Century Motorsport	BMW M4 GT3	BMW S58B30T0 3.0 L Turbo V8	22	(United Kingdom) Lewis Plato	PA	All
(United Kingdom) Century Motorsport	BMW M4 GT3	BMW S58B30T0 3.0 L Turbo V8	22	(United Kingdom) Jake Rattenbury	PA	3
(Germany) MRS GT-Racing	Porsche 911 GT3 R (991.2)	Porsche 4.0 L Flat-6	17	(Saint Kitts and Nevis) Alexander Bukhanstov (Note: Borisov, Buhkanstov, Dzhalilov, Mavlanov, Minsky, Bulatov, Salikhov, Shaytar, Solukovtsev, Stanchin and Lomko, also Russians, compete under an Armenian, a Kittian, a Slovak, a German, a Kyrgyz and a Grenadian licence respectively as Russian national emblems were banned by the FIA following the Russian invasion of Ukraine.)	Am	3
(Germany) MRS GT-Racing	Porsche 911 GT3 R (991.2)	Porsche 4.0 L Flat-6	17	(Australia) John Corbett	Am	3
(Germany) MRS GT-Racing	Porsche 911 GT3 R (991.2)	Porsche 4.0 L Flat-6	17	(United Kingdom) George King	Am	3
(Germany) MRS GT-Racing	Porsche 911 GT3 R (991.2)	Porsche 4.0 L Flat-6	17	(United Kingdom) James Winslow	Am	3
(France) Saintéloc Junior Team	Audi R8 LMS Evo II	Audi DAR 5.2 L V10	18	(Austria) Michael Doppelmayr	PA	3
(France) Saintéloc Junior Team	Audi R8 LMS Evo II	Audi DAR 5.2 L V10	18	(Germany) Elia Erhart	PA	3
(France) Saintéloc Junior Team	Audi R8 LMS Evo II	Audi DAR 5.2 L V10	18	(Germany) Sven Herberger	PA	3
(France) Saintéloc Junior Team	Audi R8 LMS Evo II	Audi DAR 5.2 L V10	18	(Germany) Pierre Kaffer	PA	3
(France) Saintéloc Junior Team	Audi R8 LMS Evo II	Audi DAR 5.2 L V10	26	(France) Mattéo Merafina	Am	3
(France) Saintéloc Junior Team	Audi R8 LMS Evo II	Audi DAR 5.2 L V10	26	(France) Thomas Merafina	Am	3
(France) Saintéloc Junior Team	Audi R8 LMS Evo II	Audi DAR 5.2 L V10	26	(France) Wilfried Merafina	Am	3
(Antigua and Barbuda) HAAS RT	Audi R8 LMS Evo II	Audi DAR 5.2 L V10	21	(Belgium) Mathieu Detry	Am	2–3
(Antigua and Barbuda) HAAS RT	Audi R8 LMS Evo II	Audi DAR 5.2 L V10	21	(Germany) Thomas Kiefer	Am	2–3
(Antigua and Barbuda) HAAS RT	Audi R8 LMS Evo II	Audi DAR 5.2 L V10	21	(Germany) Torsten Kratz	Am	2–3
(Antigua and Barbuda) HAAS RT	Audi R8 LMS Evo II	Audi DAR 5.2 L V10	21	(Kyrgyzstan) Stanislav Minsky	Am	2–3
(Antigua and Barbuda) HAAS RT	Audi R8 LMS Evo II	Audi DAR 5.2 L V10	21	(Finland) Miika Panu	Am	3
(Antigua and Barbuda) HAAS RT	Mercedes-AMG GT3 Evo	Mercedes-AMG M159 6.2 L V8	92	(Italy) Edoardo Bacci	PA	2
(Antigua and Barbuda) HAAS RT	Mercedes-AMG GT3 Evo	Mercedes-AMG M159 6.2 L V8	92	(Lebanon) Masoud Jaberian	PA	2
(Antigua and Barbuda) HAAS RT	Mercedes-AMG GT3 Evo	Mercedes-AMG M159 6.2 L V8	92	(Italy) Alessandro Tonoli	PA	2
(United States) Heart of Racing by SPS	Mercedes-AMG GT3 Evo	Mercedes-AMG M159 6.2 L V8	27	(Brazil) Pierre Kleinubing	PA	3
(United States) Heart of Racing by SPS	Mercedes-AMG GT3 Evo	Mercedes-AMG M159 6.2 L V8	27	(Italy) Daniel Mancinelli	PA	3
(United States) Heart of Racing by SPS	Mercedes-AMG GT3 Evo	Mercedes-AMG M159 6.2 L V8	27	(United States) Gray Newell	PA	3
(United States) Heart of Racing by SPS	Mercedes-AMG GT3 Evo	Mercedes-AMG M159 6.2 L V8	27	(United Kingdom) Darren Turner	PA	3
(United Kingdom) Team Parker Racing	Bentley Continental GT3	Bentley 4.0 L Turbo V8	31	(United Kingdom) Robert Huff	PA	3
(United Kingdom) Team Parker Racing	Bentley Continental GT3	Bentley 4.0 L Turbo V8	31	(United Kingdom) Max Lynn	PA	3
(United Kingdom) Team Parker Racing	Bentley Continental GT3	Bentley 4.0 L Turbo V8	31	(United Kingdom) Shaun Lynn	PA	3
(United Kingdom) Team Parker Racing	Bentley Continental GT3	Bentley 4.0 L Turbo V8	31	(United Kingdom) Joe Wheeler	PA	3
(Slovakia) ARC Bratislava	Lamborghini Huracán GT3 Evo	Lamborghini DGF 5.2 L V10	44	(Czech Republic) Petr Fulín	Am	2
(Slovakia) ARC Bratislava	Lamborghini Huracán GT3 Evo	Lamborghini DGF 5.2 L V10	44	(Slovakia) Miro Konôpka	Am	2
(Slovakia) ARC Bratislava	Lamborghini Huracán GT3 Evo	Lamborghini DGF 5.2 L V10	44	(Slovakia) Zdeno Mikulasko	Am	2
(United Arab Emirates) S'Aalocin by Kox Racing	Porsche 911 GT3 R (991.2)	Porsche 4.0 L Flat-6	48	(Netherlands) Peter Kox	Am	2–3
(United Arab Emirates) S'Aalocin by Kox Racing	Porsche 911 GT3 R (991.2)	Porsche 4.0 L Flat-6	48	(Netherlands) Stéphane Kox	Am	2–3
(United Arab Emirates) S'Aalocin by Kox Racing	Porsche 911 GT3 R (991.2)	Porsche 4.0 L Flat-6	48	(Netherlands) Nico Pronk	Am	2–3
(United Arab Emirates) S'Aalocin by Kox Racing	Porsche 911 GT3 R (991.2)	Porsche 4.0 L Flat-6	48	(Belgium) Tom Boonen	Am	3
(United Arab Emirates) S'Aalocin by Kox Racing	Porsche 911 GT3 R (991.2)	Porsche 4.0 L Flat-6	48	(Netherlands) Dennis Retera	Am	3
(Germany) Huber Motorsport	Porsche 911 GT3 R (992)	Porsche M97/80 4.2 L Flat-6	50	(Germany) Marc Bartels	P	2
(Germany) Huber Motorsport	Porsche 911 GT3 R (992)	Porsche M97/80 4.2 L Flat-6	50	(Germany) Finn Gehrsitz	P	2
(Germany) Huber Motorsport	Porsche 911 GT3 R (992)	Porsche M97/80 4.2 L Flat-6	50	(Germany) Tim Zimmermann	P	2
(Germany) Huber Motorsport	Porsche 911 GT3 R (992)	Porsche M97/80 4.2 L Flat-6	50	(United States) Jason Hart	Am	3
(Germany) Huber Motorsport	Porsche 911 GT3 R (992)	Porsche M97/80 4.2 L Flat-6	50	(United States) Scott Noble	Am	3
(Germany) Huber Motorsport	Porsche 911 GT3 R (992)	Porsche M97/80 4.2 L Flat-6	50	(United States) Florian Spengler	Am	3
(Germany) Huber Motorsport	Porsche 911 GT3 R (992)	Porsche M97/80 4.2 L Flat-6	50	(Germany) Hans Wehrmann	Am	3
(Austria) Eastalent Racing Team	Audi R8 LMS Evo II	Audi DAR 5.2 L V10	54	(Germany) Christopher Haase	P	3
(Austria) Eastalent Racing Team	Audi R8 LMS Evo II	Audi DAR 5.2 L V10	54	(Belgium) Gilles Magnus	P	3
(Austria) Eastalent Racing Team	Audi R8 LMS Evo II	Audi DAR 5.2 L V10	54	(Austria) Simon Reicher	P	3
(Austria) Eastalent Racing Team	Audi R8 LMS Evo II	Audi DAR 5.2 L V10	54	(Germany) Markus Winkelhock	P	3
(Austria) Eastalent Racing Team	Audi R8 LMS Evo II	Audi DAR 5.2 L V10	54	(China) Mike Zhou	P	3
(Germany) Leipert Motorsport	Lamborghini Huracán GT3 Evo 2	Lamborghini DGF 5.2 L V10	63	(New Zealand) Brendon Leitch	PA	3
(Germany) Leipert Motorsport	Lamborghini Huracán GT3 Evo 2	Lamborghini DGF 5.2 L V10	63	(Italy) Marco Mapelli	PA	3
(Germany) Leipert Motorsport	Lamborghini Huracán GT3 Evo 2	Lamborghini DGF 5.2 L V10	63	(Luxembourg) Gabriele Rindone	PA	3
(Germany) Leipert Motorsport	Lamborghini Huracán GT3 Evo 2	Lamborghini DGF 5.2 L V10	63	(France) Alban Varutti	PA	3
(United Kingdom) 7TSIX	McLaren 720S GT3 Evo	McLaren M840T 4.0 L Turbo V8	76	(Austria) Philipp Baron	Am	3
(United Kingdom) 7TSIX	McLaren 720S GT3 Evo	McLaren M840T 4.0 L Turbo V8	76	(United Kingdom) Omar Jackson	Am	3
(United Kingdom) 7TSIX	McLaren 720S GT3 Evo	McLaren M840T 4.0 L Turbo V8	76	(Zimbabwe) Axcil Jefferies	Am	3
(United Kingdom) 7TSIX	McLaren 720S GT3 Evo	McLaren M840T 4.0 L Turbo V8	76	(Australia) George Nakas	Am	3
(United Kingdom) 7TSIX	McLaren 720S GT3 Evo	McLaren M840T 4.0 L Turbo V8	76	(Australia) Fraser Ross	Am	3
(Armenia) Goroyan RT by Car Collection Motorsport	Audi R8 LMS Evo II	Audi DAR 5.2 L V10	80	(Armenia) Artur Goroyan	P	2
(Armenia) Goroyan RT by Car Collection Motorsport	Audi R8 LMS Evo II	Audi DAR 5.2 L V10	80	(Armenia) Roman Mavlanov	P	2
(Armenia) Goroyan RT by Car Collection Motorsport	Audi R8 LMS Evo II	Audi DAR 5.2 L V10	80	(Germany) Markus Winkelhock	P	2
(Germany) Car Collection Motorsport	Porsche 911 GT3 R (992)	Porsche M97/80 4.2 L Flat-6	96	(United States) Dustin Blattner	PA	2–3
(Germany) Car Collection Motorsport	Porsche 911 GT3 R (992)	Porsche M97/80 4.2 L Flat-6	96	(Germany) Dennis Marschall	PA	2–3
(Germany) Car Collection Motorsport	Porsche 911 GT3 R (992)	Porsche M97/80 4.2 L Flat-6	96	(Netherlands) Loek Hartog	PA	2
(Germany) Car Collection Motorsport	Porsche 911 GT3 R (992)	Porsche M97/80 4.2 L Flat-6	96	(Italy) Sebastian Gorga	PA	3
(Germany) Car Collection Motorsport	Porsche 911 GT3 R (992)	Porsche M97/80 4.2 L Flat-6	96	(Lebanon) Fuad Sawaya	PA	3
(Germany) Car Collection Motorsport	Porsche 911 GT3 R (992)	Porsche M97/80 4.2 L Flat-6	96	(Germany) Mark Wallenwein	PA	3
(Germany) Proton Huber Competition	Porsche 911 GT3 R (992)	Porsche M97/80 4.2 L Flat-6	83	(Armenia) Sergei Borisov	PA	3
(Germany) Proton Huber Competition	Porsche 911 GT3 R (992)	Porsche M97/80 4.2 L Flat-6	83	(Germany) Sven Müller	PA	3
(Germany) Proton Huber Competition	Porsche 911 GT3 R (992)	Porsche M97/80 4.2 L Flat-6	83	(Armenia) Rinat Salikhov	PA	3
(Germany) Proton Huber Competition	Porsche 911 GT3 R (992)	Porsche M97/80 4.2 L Flat-6	83	(Armenia) Viktor Shaytar	PA	3
(United States) CP Racing	Mercedes-AMG GT3 Evo	Mercedes-AMG M159 6.2 L V8	85	(United States) Charles Espenlaub	Am	All
(United States) CP Racing	Mercedes-AMG GT3 Evo	Mercedes-AMG M159 6.2 L V8	85	(United States) Joe Foster	Am	All
(United States) CP Racing	Mercedes-AMG GT3 Evo	Mercedes-AMG M159 6.2 L V8	85	(United States) Shane Lewis	Am	All
(United States) CP Racing	Mercedes-AMG GT3 Evo	Mercedes-AMG M159 6.2 L V8	85	(United States) Charles Putman	Am	All
(United States) CP Racing	Mercedes-AMG GT3 Evo	Mercedes-AMG M159 6.2 L V8	85	(United States) Darren Law	Am	3
(United Arab Emirates) Baron Motorsport	Ferrari 488 GT3 Evo 2020	Ferrari F154CB 3.9 L Turbo V8	86	(Austria) Philipp Baron	Am	2
(United Arab Emirates) Baron Motorsport	Ferrari 488 GT3 Evo 2020	Ferrari F154CB 3.9 L Turbo V8	86	(Zimbabwe) Axcil Jefferies	Am	2
(United Arab Emirates) Baron Motorsport	Ferrari 488 GT3 Evo 2020	Ferrari F154CB 3.9 L Turbo V8	86	(Austria) Ernst Kirchmayr	Am	2
(United Kingdom) ROFGO with Dragon Racing	Ferrari 296 GT3	Ferrari F163 3.0 L Turbo V6	88	(Denmark) Benjamin Goethe	P	3
(United Kingdom) ROFGO with Dragon Racing	Ferrari 296 GT3	Ferrari F163 3.0 L Turbo V6	88	(Denmark) Oliver Goethe	P	3
(United Kingdom) ROFGO with Dragon Racing	Ferrari 296 GT3	Ferrari F163 3.0 L Turbo V6	88	(Germany) Roald Goethe	P	3
(United Kingdom) ROFGO with Dragon Racing	Ferrari 296 GT3	Ferrari F163 3.0 L Turbo V6	88	(South Africa) Jordan Grogor	P	3
(United Kingdom) ROFGO with Dragon Racing	Ferrari 296 GT3	Ferrari F163 3.0 L Turbo V6	88	(United Kingdom) Stuart Hall	P	3
(Germany) Herberth Motorsport	Porsche 911 GT3 R (992)	Porsche M97/80 4.2 L Flat-6	91	(Germany) Ralf Bohn	Am 2 PA 3	2–3
(Germany) Herberth Motorsport	Porsche 911 GT3 R (992)	Porsche M97/80 4.2 L Flat-6	91	(Germany) Alfred Renauer	Am 2 PA 3	2–3
(Germany) Herberth Motorsport	Porsche 911 GT3 R (992)	Porsche M97/80 4.2 L Flat-6	91	(Hong Kong) Antares Au	Am 2 PA 3	2
(Germany) Herberth Motorsport	Porsche 911 GT3 R (992)	Porsche M97/80 4.2 L Flat-6	91	(Switzerland) Daniel Allemann	Am 2 PA 3	3
(Germany) Herberth Motorsport	Porsche 911 GT3 R (992)	Porsche M97/80 4.2 L Flat-6	91	(Germany) Robert Renauer	Am 2 PA 3	3
(United Arab Emirates) Manamauri Energy by Ebimotors	Porsche 911 GT3 R (992)	Porsche M97/80 4.2 L Flat-6	95	(Italy) Fabrizio Broggi	P 1 PA 2	All
(United Arab Emirates) Manamauri Energy by Ebimotors	Porsche 911 GT3 R (992)	Porsche M97/80 4.2 L Flat-6	95	(Italy) Sabino de Castro	P 1 PA 2	All
(United Arab Emirates) Manamauri Energy by Ebimotors	Porsche 911 GT3 R (992)	Porsche M97/80 4.2 L Flat-6	95	(Romania) Sergiu Nicolae	P 1 PA 2	All
(United Arab Emirates) Manamauri Energy by Ebimotors	Porsche 911 GT3 R (992)	Porsche M97/80 4.2 L Flat-6	95	(Italy) Cosimo Papi	P 1 PA 2	All
(Germany) Attempto Racing	Audi R8 LMS Evo II	Audi DAR 5.2 L V10	99	(Germany) Alex Aka	P	2–3
(Germany) Attempto Racing	Audi R8 LMS Evo II	Audi DAR 5.2 L V10	99	(Belgium) Jef Machiels	P	2
(Germany) Attempto Racing	Audi R8 LMS Evo II	Audi DAR 5.2 L V10	99	(Germany) Florian Scholze	P	2
(Germany) Attempto Racing	Audi R8 LMS Evo II	Audi DAR 5.2 L V10	99	(Switzerland) Ricardo Feller	P	3
(Germany) Attempto Racing	Audi R8 LMS Evo II	Audi DAR 5.2 L V10	99	Andrey Mukovoz (Note: SMP Racing along with Bolduev, Bukhanstov, Denisov, Gadetskii, Krapivtsev, Loboda, Mavlanov, Mukovoz, Muraveika, Petrov, Pogosyan, Remenyako, Sirotkin, Smolyar and Titarenko are Russian, but they compete as neutral competitors as Russian national emblems were banned by the FIA following the Russian invasion of Ukraine.)	P	3
(Germany) Attempto Racing	Audi R8 LMS Evo II	Audi DAR 5.2 L V10	99	(Luxembourg) Dylan Pereira	P	3
(Germany) Attempto Racing	Audi R8 LMS Evo II	Audi DAR 5.2 L V10	99	Sergey Titarenko	P	3
GTX
(France) Vortex V8	Vortex 2.0	Chevrolet LS3 6.2 L V8	701	(France) Lionel Amrouche	All	
(France) Vortex V8	Vortex 2.0	Chevrolet LS3 6.2 L V8	701	(France) Philippe Bonnel	All	
(France) Vortex V8	Vortex 2.0	Chevrolet LS3 6.2 L V8	701	(France) Arnaud Gomez	All	
(France) Vortex V8	Vortex 2.0	Chevrolet LS3 6.2 L V8	701	(France) Olivier Gomez	All	
(Germany) Leipert Motorsport	Lamborghini Huracán Super Trofeo Evo 2	Lamborghini 5.2 L V10	710	(United States) Gregg Gorski	2	
(Germany) Leipert Motorsport	Lamborghini Huracán Super Trofeo Evo 2	Lamborghini 5.2 L V10	710	(Australia) Brendon Leitch	2	
(Germany) Leipert Motorsport	Lamborghini Huracán Super Trofeo Evo 2	Lamborghini 5.2 L V10	710	(United States) Gerhard Watzinger	2	
(Austria) Razoon – More than Racing	KTM X-Bow GT2	Audi 2.5 L I5	714	(Poland) Arthur Chwist	All	
(Austria) Razoon – More than Racing	KTM X-Bow GT2	Audi 2.5 L I5	714	(Austria) Daniel Drexel	All	
(Austria) Razoon – More than Racing	KTM X-Bow GT2	Audi 2.5 L I5	714	(Kuwait) Haytham Qarajouli	1, 3	
(Austria) Razoon – More than Racing	KTM X-Bow GT2	Audi 2.5 L I5	714	(Austria) Dominik Olbert	1	
(Austria) Razoon – More than Racing	KTM X-Bow GT2	Audi 2.5 L I5	714	(Austria) Denis Liebl	2	
(Austria) Razoon – More than Racing	KTM X-Bow GT2	Audi 2.5 L I5	714	(South Africa) Mikaeel Pitamber	3	
(Austria) Razoon – More than Racing	KTM X-Bow GT2	Audi 2.5 L I5	714	(United States) Kevin Woods	3	
(Portugal) P21 Motorsport	Porsche 991 GT3 Cup II	Porsche 4.0 L Flat-6	715	(Portugal) Rúben Costa	2	
(Portugal) P21 Motorsport	Porsche 991 GT3 Cup II	Porsche 4.0 L Flat-6	715	(Portugal) José Monroy	2	
(Portugal) P21 Motorsport	Porsche 991 GT3 Cup II	Porsche 4.0 L Flat-6	715	(Portugal) Rui Miritta	2	
(Portugal) P21 Motorsport	Porsche 991 GT3 Cup II	Porsche 4.0 L Flat-6	715	(Brazil) "BigGeorge"	2	
(Portugal) P21 Motorsport	Porsche 991 GT3 Cup I	Porsche 3.8 L Flat-6	721	(Portugal) Rúben Costa	2	
(Portugal) P21 Motorsport	Porsche 991 GT3 Cup I	Porsche 3.8 L Flat-6	721	(Portugal) Alexandre Fonseca	2	
(Portugal) P21 Motorsport	Porsche 991 GT3 Cup I	Porsche 3.8 L Flat-6	721	(Portugal) José Monroy	2	
(Portugal) P21 Motorsport	Porsche 991 GT3 Cup I	Porsche 3.8 L Flat-6	721	(Portugal) Kika Queiroz	2	
(United Kingdom) Scott Sport	Lamborghini Huracán Super Trofeo Evo	Lamborghini 5.2 L V10	750	(Canada) Keith Frieser	2	
(United Kingdom) Scott Sport	Lamborghini Huracán Super Trofeo Evo	Lamborghini 5.2 L V10	750	(Denmark) Mikkel Mac	2	
(United Kingdom) Toro Verde GT	Ginetta G56 Cup	GM LS3 6.2 L V8	795	(United Kingdom) Mike Simpson	All	
(United Kingdom) Toro Verde GT	Ginetta G56 Cup	GM LS3 6.2 L V8	795	(United Kingdom) Freddie Tomlinson	All	
(United Kingdom) Toro Verde GT	Ginetta G56 Cup	GM LS3 6.2 L V8	795	(United Kingdom) Lawrence Tomlinson	All	
(United Kingdom) Toro Verde GT	Ginetta G56 Cup	GM LS3 6.2 L V8	795	(France) Nico Prost	3	
992
(Germany) PROsport Racing	Porsche 992 GT3 Cup	Porsche 4.0 L Flat-6	901	(Belgium) Simon Balcaen	Am	3
(Germany) PROsport Racing	Porsche 992 GT3 Cup	Porsche 4.0 L Flat-6	901	(Belgium) Guillaume Dumarey	Am	3
(Germany) PROsport Racing	Porsche 992 GT3 Cup	Porsche 4.0 L Flat-6	901	(France) Steven Palette	Am	3
(Germany) PROsport Racing	Porsche 992 GT3 Cup	Porsche 4.0 L Flat-6	901	(Germany) Jörg Viebahn	Am	3
(Denmark) Holmgaard Motorsport	Porsche 992 GT3 Cup	Porsche 4.0 L Flat-6	902	(Australia) Darren Currie	P	3
(Denmark) Holmgaard Motorsport	Porsche 992 GT3 Cup	Porsche 4.0 L Flat-6	902	(Australia) Axle Donaldson	P	3
(Denmark) Holmgaard Motorsport	Porsche 992 GT3 Cup	Porsche 4.0 L Flat-6	902	(Denmark) Jonas Holmgaard	P	3
(Denmark) Holmgaard Motorsport	Porsche 992 GT3 Cup	Porsche 4.0 L Flat-6	902	(Denmark) Magnus Holmgaard	P	3
(Denmark) Holmgaard Motorsport	Porsche 992 GT3 Cup	Porsche 4.0 L Flat-6	902	(Denmark) Patrick Steen Rasmussen	P	3
(Belgium) Red Ant Racing	Porsche 992 GT3 Cup	Porsche 4.0 L Flat-6	903	(Belgium) Peter Guelinckx	P	3
(Belgium) Red Ant Racing	Porsche 992 GT3 Cup	Porsche 4.0 L Flat-6	903	(Belgium) Jef Machiels	P	3
(Belgium) Red Ant Racing	Porsche 992 GT3 Cup	Porsche 4.0 L Flat-6	903	(Belgium) Ayrton Redant	P	3
(Belgium) Red Ant Racing	Porsche 992 GT3 Cup	Porsche 4.0 L Flat-6	903	(Belgium) Yannick Redant	P	3
(Germany) RPM Racing	Porsche 992 GT3 Cup	Porsche 4.0 L Flat-6	907	(Sweden) Niclas Jönsson	Am	3
(Germany) RPM Racing	Porsche 992 GT3 Cup	Porsche 4.0 L Flat-6	907	(Germany) Philip Hamprecht	Am	3
(Germany) RPM Racing	Porsche 992 GT3 Cup	Porsche 4.0 L Flat-6	907	(Netherlands) Patrick Huisman	Am	3
(Germany) RPM Racing	Porsche 992 GT3 Cup	Porsche 4.0 L Flat-6	907	(United States) Tracy Krohn	Am	3
(France) SebLajoux Racing by DUWO Racing	Porsche 992 GT3 Cup	Porsche 4.0 L Flat-6	908	(France) Sebastien Lajoux	Am	2–3
(France) SebLajoux Racing by DUWO Racing	Porsche 992 GT3 Cup	Porsche 4.0 L Flat-6	908	(Belgium) Benjamin Paque	Am	2–3
(France) SebLajoux Racing by DUWO Racing	Porsche 992 GT3 Cup	Porsche 4.0 L Flat-6	908	(France) Stéphane Perrin	Am	2–3
(France) SebLajoux Racing by DUWO Racing	Porsche 992 GT3 Cup	Porsche 4.0 L Flat-6	908	(Netherlands) Flynt Schuring	Am	3
(France) SebLajoux Racing by DUWO Racing	Porsche 992 GT3 Cup	Porsche 4.0 L Flat-6	908	(France) Lucas Walter	Am	3
(Netherlands) Red Camel-Jordans.nl	Porsche 992 GT3 Cup	Porsche 4.0 L Flat-6	909	(Netherlands) Ivo Breukers	P	All
(Netherlands) Red Camel-Jordans.nl	Porsche 992 GT3 Cup	Porsche 4.0 L Flat-6	909	(Netherlands) Luc Breukers	P	All
(Netherlands) Red Camel-Jordans.nl	Porsche 992 GT3 Cup	Porsche 4.0 L Flat-6	909	(Switzerland) Fabian Danz	P	All
(Netherlands) Red Camel-Jordans.nl	Porsche 992 GT3 Cup	Porsche 4.0 L Flat-6	909	(Netherlands) Rik Breukers	P	1, 3
(United Arab Emirates) PRP Motorsports with HRT	Porsche 992 GT3 Cup	Porsche 4.0 L Flat-6	918	(United Kingdom) Steven Liquorish	Am	2
(United Arab Emirates) PRP Motorsports with HRT	Porsche 992 GT3 Cup	Porsche 4.0 L Flat-6	918	(United Kingdom) Graeme Mundy	Am	2
(United Arab Emirates) PRP Motorsports with HRT	Porsche 992 GT3 Cup	Porsche 4.0 L Flat-6	918	(France) Gilles Vannelet	Am	2
(Germany) HRT Performance	Porsche 992 GT3 Cup	Porsche 4.0 L Flat-6	929	(United Kingdom) Jamie Day	P	3
(Germany) HRT Performance	Porsche 992 GT3 Cup	Porsche 4.0 L Flat-6	929	(United States) Gregg Gorski	P	3
(Germany) HRT Performance	Porsche 992 GT3 Cup	Porsche 4.0 L Flat-6	929	(Germany) Holger Harmsen	P	3
(Germany) HRT Performance	Porsche 992 GT3 Cup	Porsche 4.0 L Flat-6	929	(China) Liang Jiatong	P	3
(Germany) HRT Performance	Porsche 992 GT3 Cup	Porsche 4.0 L Flat-6	930	(France) Stéphane Adler	Am	3
(Germany) HRT Performance	Porsche 992 GT3 Cup	Porsche 4.0 L Flat-6	930	(France) Michael Blanchemain	Am	3
(Germany) HRT Performance	Porsche 992 GT3 Cup	Porsche 4.0 L Flat-6	930	(France) Jérôme Da Costa	Am	3
(Germany) HRT Performance	Porsche 992 GT3 Cup	Porsche 4.0 L Flat-6	930	(France) Franck Eburderie	Am	3
(Germany) HRT Performance	Porsche 992 GT3 Cup	Porsche 4.0 L Flat-6	930	(France) Franck Lavergne	Am	3
QMMF by HRT Suhail Qatar	Porsche 992 GT3 Cup	Porsche 4.0 L Flat-6	931	(Qatar) Ibrahim Al-Abdulghani	Am	2–3
QMMF by HRT Suhail Qatar	Porsche 992 GT3 Cup	Porsche 4.0 L Flat-6	931	(Qatar) Abdulla Ali Al-Khelaifi	Am	2–3
QMMF by HRT Suhail Qatar	Porsche 992 GT3 Cup	Porsche 4.0 L Flat-6	931	(Qatar) Ghanim Ali Al Maadheed	Am	2–3
QMMF by HRT Suhail Qatar	Porsche 992 GT3 Cup	Porsche 4.0 L Flat-6	931	(Germany) Julian Hanses	Am	2–3
(Belgium) Mühlner Motorsport	Porsche 992 GT3 Cup	Porsche 4.0 L Flat-6	921	(Grenada) Vladislav Lomko	P	2–3
(Belgium) Mühlner Motorsport	Porsche 992 GT3 Cup	Porsche 4.0 L Flat-6	921	(United States) Bryan Sircely	P	2–3
(Belgium) Mühlner Motorsport	Porsche 992 GT3 Cup	Porsche 4.0 L Flat-6	921	(France) Gilles Vannelet	P	2–3
(Belgium) Mühlner Motorsport	Porsche 992 GT3 Cup	Porsche 4.0 L Flat-6	921	(Germany) Peter Terting	P	2
(Belgium) Mühlner Motorsport	Porsche 992 GT3 Cup	Porsche 4.0 L Flat-6	921	(United Arab Emirates) Keanu Al Azhari	P	3
(Netherlands) Team Captain America by Bas Koeten Racing	Porsche 992 GT3 Cup	Porsche 4.0 L Flat-6	925	(United States) Richard Edge	Am	3
(Netherlands) Team Captain America by Bas Koeten Racing	Porsche 992 GT3 Cup	Porsche 4.0 L Flat-6	925	(United States) Curt Swearingin	Am	3
(Netherlands) Team Captain America by Bas Koeten Racing	Porsche 992 GT3 Cup	Porsche 4.0 L Flat-6	925	(United States) Grant Talkie	Am	3
(Netherlands) Team Captain America by Bas Koeten Racing	Porsche 992 GT3 Cup	Porsche 4.0 L Flat-6	925	(United States) Pedro Torres	Am	3
(Netherlands) Team Captain America by Bas Koeten Racing	Porsche 992 GT3 Cup	Porsche 4.0 L Flat-6	925	(Netherlands) Kay van Berlo	Am	3
(Netherlands) NKPP Racing by Bas Koeten	Porsche 992 GT3 Cup	Porsche 4.0 L Flat-6	992	(Netherlands) Gjis Bessem	Am	2–3
(Netherlands) NKPP Racing by Bas Koeten	Porsche 992 GT3 Cup	Porsche 4.0 L Flat-6	992	(Netherlands) Harry Hilders	Am	2–3
(Netherlands) NKPP Racing by Bas Koeten	Porsche 992 GT3 Cup	Porsche 4.0 L Flat-6	992	(Netherlands) Bob Herber	Am	3
(Netherlands) NKPP Racing by Bas Koeten	Porsche 992 GT3 Cup	Porsche 4.0 L Flat-6	992	(Finland) Kari-Pekka Laaksonen	Am	3
(Germany) SRS Team Sorg Rennsport	Porsche 992 GT3 Cup	Porsche 4.0 L Flat-6	927	(Germany) Stefan Beyer	Am	3
(Germany) SRS Team Sorg Rennsport	Porsche 992 GT3 Cup	Porsche 4.0 L Flat-6	927	(Switzerland) Patrik Grütter	Am	3
(Germany) SRS Team Sorg Rennsport	Porsche 992 GT3 Cup	Porsche 4.0 L Flat-6	927	(Ukraine) Oleksiy Kikireshko	Am	3
(Germany) SRS Team Sorg Rennsport	Porsche 992 GT3 Cup	Porsche 4.0 L Flat-6	927	(Germany) Marlon Menden	Am	3
(Germany) KKrämer Racing	Porsche 992 GT3 Cup	Porsche 4.0 L Flat-6	936	(Germany) Michele di Martino	P 1 Am 2	All
(Germany) KKrämer Racing	Porsche 992 GT3 Cup	Porsche 4.0 L Flat-6	936	(Germany) Karsten Krämer	P 1 Am 2	All
(Germany) KKrämer Racing	Porsche 992 GT3 Cup	Porsche 4.0 L Flat-6	936	(Kyrgyzstan) "Selv"	P 1 Am 2	1–2
(Germany) KKrämer Racing	Porsche 992 GT3 Cup	Porsche 4.0 L Flat-6	936	(Germany) Moritz Kranz	P 1 Am 2	1
(Germany) KKrämer Racing	Porsche 992 GT3 Cup	Porsche 4.0 L Flat-6	936	(Germany) Tobias Müller	P 1 Am 2	1
(Germany) KKrämer Racing	Porsche 992 GT3 Cup	Porsche 4.0 L Flat-6	936	(Germany) Fidel Leib	P 1 Am 2	2–3
(Germany) KKrämer Racing	Porsche 992 GT3 Cup	Porsche 4.0 L Flat-6	936	(Germany) Alexej Veremenko	P 1 Am 2	2
(Germany) KKrämer Racing	Porsche 992 GT3 Cup	Porsche 4.0 L Flat-6	936	(Germany) Christopher Brueck	P 1 Am 2	3
(Germany) KKrämer Racing	Porsche 992 GT3 Cup	Porsche 4.0 L Flat-6	936	Denis Remenyako	P 1 Am 2	3
(Germany) KKrämer Racing	Porsche 992 GT3 Cup	Porsche 4.0 L Flat-6	937	(Germany) Karsten Krämer	Am 1 P 2	1–2
(Germany) KKrämer Racing	Porsche 992 GT3 Cup	Porsche 4.0 L Flat-6	937	(Germany) Michele di Martino	Am 1 P 2	1
(Germany) KKrämer Racing	Porsche 992 GT3 Cup	Porsche 4.0 L Flat-6	937	(Kyrgyzstan) "Selv"	Am 1 P 2	1
(Germany) KKrämer Racing	Porsche 992 GT3 Cup	Porsche 4.0 L Flat-6	937	(Australia) Cameron McLeod	Am 1 P 2	2
(Germany) KKrämer Racing	Porsche 992 GT3 Cup	Porsche 4.0 L Flat-6	937	(Italy) Mark "Speakerwas"	Am 1 P 2	2
(Germany) KKrämer Racing	Porsche 992 GT3 Cup	Porsche 4.0 L Flat-6	937	(Germany) Etienne Ploenes	Am 1 P 2	2
SMP Racing	Porsche 992 GT3 Cup	Porsche 4.0 L Flat-6	937	Aleksandr Bolduev	P	3
SMP Racing	Porsche 992 GT3 Cup	Porsche 4.0 L Flat-6	937	Vitaly Petrov	P	3
SMP Racing	Porsche 992 GT3 Cup	Porsche 4.0 L Flat-6	937	Denis Remenyako	P	3
SMP Racing	Porsche 992 GT3 Cup	Porsche 4.0 L Flat-6	937	Sergey Sirotkin	P	3
SMP Racing	Porsche 992 GT3 Cup	Porsche 4.0 L Flat-6	937	Alexander Smolyar	P	3
(Switzerland) Fach Auto Tech	Porsche 992 GT3 Cup	Porsche 4.0 L Flat-6	961	(Belgium) Marc Devis	Am	3
(Switzerland) Fach Auto Tech	Porsche 992 GT3 Cup	Porsche 4.0 L Flat-6	961	(Germany) Michael Hinderer	Am	3
(Switzerland) Fach Auto Tech	Porsche 992 GT3 Cup	Porsche 4.0 L Flat-6	961	(Switzerland) Yves Scemama	Am	3
(Switzerland) Fach Auto Tech	Porsche 992 GT3 Cup	Porsche 4.0 L Flat-6	961	(Switzerland) Christian Traber	Am	3
(Switzerland) Fach Auto Tech	Porsche 992 GT3 Cup	Porsche 4.0 L Flat-6	961	(Belgium) Nico Verdonck	Am	3
(Switzerland) Fach Auto Tech	Porsche 992 GT3 Cup	Porsche 4.0 L Flat-6	962	(Netherlands) Paul Meijer	P	3
(Switzerland) Fach Auto Tech	Porsche 992 GT3 Cup	Porsche 4.0 L Flat-6	962	(Netherlands) Ralph Poppelaars	P	3
(Switzerland) Fach Auto Tech	Porsche 992 GT3 Cup	Porsche 4.0 L Flat-6	962	(Netherlands) Jop Rappange	P	3
(Switzerland) Fach Auto Tech	Porsche 992 GT3 Cup	Porsche 4.0 L Flat-6	962	(Netherlands) Huub van Eijndhoven	P	3
(Netherlands) MDM Ireckonu	Porsche 992 GT3 Cup	Porsche 4.0 L Flat-6	965	(Netherlands) Tom Coronel	P	2
(Netherlands) MDM Ireckonu	Porsche 992 GT3 Cup	Porsche 4.0 L Flat-6	965	(Netherlands) Jan Jaap van Roon	P	2
(United Arab Emirates) RABDAN by Fulgenzi Racing	Porsche 992 GT3 Cup	Porsche 4.0 L Flat-6	971	(United Arab Emirates) Saif Alameri	P 1 Am 2	All
(United Arab Emirates) RABDAN by Fulgenzi Racing	Porsche 992 GT3 Cup	Porsche 4.0 L Flat-6	971	(Austria) Christopher Zöchling	P 1 Am 2	All
(United Arab Emirates) RABDAN by Fulgenzi Racing	Porsche 992 GT3 Cup	Porsche 4.0 L Flat-6	971	(Italy) Enrico Fulgenzi	P 1 Am 2	1
(United Arab Emirates) RABDAN by Fulgenzi Racing	Porsche 992 GT3 Cup	Porsche 4.0 L Flat-6	971	(United Arab Emirates) Salem Alketbi	P 1 Am 2	2–3
(United Arab Emirates) RABDAN by Fulgenzi Racing	Porsche 992 GT3 Cup	Porsche 4.0 L Flat-6	971	(United Arab Emirates) Helal Al Mazrouei	P 1 Am 2	3
(United Arab Emirates) RABDAN by Fulgenzi Racing	Porsche 992 GT3 Cup	Porsche 4.0 L Flat-6	971	(United Arab Emirates) Fahad Alzaab	P 1 Am 2	3
(Austria) Neuhofer Rennsport by MRS GT-Racing	Porsche 992 GT3 Cup	Porsche 4.0 L Flat-6	988	(Austria) Felix Neuhofer	Am 2 P 3	2–3
(Austria) Neuhofer Rennsport by MRS GT-Racing	Porsche 992 GT3 Cup	Porsche 4.0 L Flat-6	988	(Austria) Markus Neuhofer	Am 2 P 3	2–3
(Austria) Neuhofer Rennsport by MRS GT-Racing	Porsche 992 GT3 Cup	Porsche 4.0 L Flat-6	988	Alexey Denisov	Am 2 P 3	2
(Austria) Neuhofer Rennsport by MRS GT-Racing	Porsche 992 GT3 Cup	Porsche 4.0 L Flat-6	988	(Austria) Martin Ragginger	Am 2 P 3	3
(Austria) Neuhofer Rennsport by MRS GT-Racing	Porsche 992 GT3 Cup	Porsche 4.0 L Flat-6	988	(Austria) Helmut Roedig	Am 2 P 3	3
(Germany) MRS GT-Racing	Porsche 992 GT3 Cup	Porsche 4.0 L Flat-6	989	(Kazakhstan) Alexandr Artemyev	Am	3
(Germany) MRS GT-Racing	Porsche 992 GT3 Cup	Porsche 4.0 L Flat-6	989	Alexey Denisov	Am	3
(Germany) MRS GT-Racing	Porsche 992 GT3 Cup	Porsche 4.0 L Flat-6	989	Nikolai Gadetskii	Am	3
(Germany) MRS GT-Racing	Porsche 992 GT3 Cup	Porsche 4.0 L Flat-6	989	(Estonia) Antti Rammo	Am	3
GT4
(United Arab Emirates) GPM Racing by Dragon	Mercedes-AMG GT4	Mercedes-AMG M178 4.0 L V8	408	(Canada) Ramez Azzam	2	
(United Arab Emirates) GPM Racing by Dragon	Mercedes-AMG GT4	Mercedes-AMG M178 4.0 L V8	408	(Germany) Denis Bulatov	2	
(United Arab Emirates) GPM Racing by Dragon	Mercedes-AMG GT4	Mercedes-AMG M178 4.0 L V8	408	(United States) Keith Gatehouse	2	
(United Kingdom) Toyota Gazoo Racing UK	Toyota GR Supra GT4 Evo	BMW B58B30 3.0 L Twin-Turbo I6	423	(United Kingdom) Samuel Harrison	2	
(United Kingdom) Toyota Gazoo Racing UK	Toyota GR Supra GT4 Evo	BMW B58B30 3.0 L Twin-Turbo I6	423	(United Kingdom) Kavi Jundu	2	
(United Kingdom) Toyota Gazoo Racing UK	Toyota GR Supra GT4 Evo	BMW B58B30 3.0 L Twin-Turbo I6	423	(United Kingdom) Michael O'Brien	2	
(United Kingdom) Toyota Gazoo Racing UK	Toyota GR Supra GT4 Evo	BMW B58B30 3.0 L Twin-Turbo I6	423	(United Kingdom) Benjamin Tusting	2	
(United Kingdom) Century Motorsport	BMW M4 GT4 Gen II	BMW N55 3.0 L Twin-Turbo I6	429	(United Kingdom) Ravi Ramyead	1–2	
(United Kingdom) Century Motorsport	BMW M4 GT4 Gen II	BMW N55 3.0 L Twin-Turbo I6	429	(United Kingdom) Charlie Robertson	1–2	
(United Kingdom) Century Motorsport	BMW M4 GT4 Gen II	BMW N55 3.0 L Twin-Turbo I6	429	(United Kingdom) David Holloway	1, 3	
(United Kingdom) Century Motorsport	BMW M4 GT4 Gen II	BMW N55 3.0 L Twin-Turbo I6	429	(United Kingdom) Nathan Freke	1	
(United Kingdom) Century Motorsport	BMW M4 GT4 Gen II	BMW N55 3.0 L Twin-Turbo I6	429	(United Kingdom) Nick Halstead	3	
(United Kingdom) Century Motorsport	BMW M4 GT4 Gen II	BMW N55 3.0 L Twin-Turbo I6	429	(United Kingdom) Piers Johnson	3	
(United Kingdom) Century Motorsport	BMW M4 GT4 Gen II	BMW N55 3.0 L Twin-Turbo I6	429	(Australia) Rianna O’Meara-Hunt	3	
(United Kingdom) AGMC Racing Team by Simpson Motorsport	BMW M4 GT4 Gen II	BMW N55 3.0 L Twin-Turbo I6	438	(Belgium) Fabian Duffieux	All	
(United Kingdom) AGMC Racing Team by Simpson Motorsport	BMW M4 GT4 Gen II	BMW N55 3.0 L Twin-Turbo I6	438	(Kyrgyzstan) Andrey Solukovtsev	1	
(United Kingdom) AGMC Racing Team by Simpson Motorsport	BMW M4 GT4 Gen II	BMW N55 3.0 L Twin-Turbo I6	438	(Cyprus) Vasily Vladykin	1	
(United Kingdom) AGMC Racing Team by Simpson Motorsport	BMW M4 GT4 Gen II	BMW N55 3.0 L Twin-Turbo I6	438	(United Kingdom) Tim Docker	2	
(United Kingdom) AGMC Racing Team by Simpson Motorsport	BMW M4 GT4 Gen II	BMW N55 3.0 L Twin-Turbo I6	438	(Kyrgyzstan) Ivan Krapivtsev	2–3	
(United Kingdom) AGMC Racing Team by Simpson Motorsport	BMW M4 GT4 Gen II	BMW N55 3.0 L Twin-Turbo I6	438	(United Kingdom) Hugo Cook	3	
(United Kingdom) AGMC Racing Team by Simpson Motorsport	BMW M4 GT4 Gen II	BMW N55 3.0 L Twin-Turbo I6	438	(Kyrgyzstan) Artur Dzhalilov	3	
(United Kingdom) AGMC Racing Team by Simpson Motorsport	BMW M4 GT4 Gen II	BMW N55 3.0 L Twin-Turbo I6	438	(Australia) Cameron McLeod	3	
(United Arab Emirates) Continental Racing	Toyota GR Supra GT4 Evo	BMW B58B30 3.0 L Twin-Turbo I6	496	(Kyrgyzstan) Andrey Solukovtsev	2–3	
(United Arab Emirates) Continental Racing	Toyota GR Supra GT4 Evo	BMW B58B30 3.0 L Twin-Turbo I6	496	(Cyprus) Vasily Vladykin	2–3	
(United Arab Emirates) Continental Racing	Toyota GR Supra GT4 Evo	BMW B58B30 3.0 L Twin-Turbo I6	496	(United Arab Emirates) Ahmed Al Khaja	2	
(United Arab Emirates) Continental Racing	Toyota GR Supra GT4 Evo	BMW B58B30 3.0 L Twin-Turbo I6	496	Mikhail Loboda	3	
(United Arab Emirates) Continental Racing	Toyota GR Supra GT4 Evo	BMW B58B30 3.0 L Twin-Turbo I6	496	David Pogosyan	3	
TCR
(United Kingdom) Simpson Motorsport	Audi RS 3 LMS TCR (2017)	Volkswagen EA888 2.0 L I4	138	(United Kingdom) Ricky Coomber	1-2	
(United Kingdom) Simpson Motorsport	Audi RS 3 LMS TCR (2017)	Volkswagen EA888 2.0 L I4	138	(United Kingdom) James Kaye	1	
(United Kingdom) Simpson Motorsport	Audi RS 3 LMS TCR (2017)	Volkswagen EA888 2.0 L I4	138	(United Kingdom) Jack Lemmer	1	
(United Kingdom) Simpson Motorsport	Audi RS 3 LMS TCR (2017)	Volkswagen EA888 2.0 L I4	138	(United Kingdom) Henry Neal	1	
(United Kingdom) Simpson Motorsport	Audi RS 3 LMS TCR (2017)	Volkswagen EA888 2.0 L I4	138	(Cyprus) Vasily Vladykin	1	
(United Kingdom) Simpson Motorsport	Audi RS 3 LMS TCR (2017)	Volkswagen EA888 2.0 L I4	138	(Kyrgyzstan) Ivan Stanchin	2	
(United Kingdom) Simpson Motorsport	Audi RS 3 LMS TCR (2017)	Volkswagen EA888 2.0 L I4	138	(United Kingdom) Jason Garrett	2	
(United Kingdom) Simpson Motorsport	Audi RS 3 LMS TCR (2017)	Volkswagen EA888 2.0 L I4	138	Andrei Muraveika	2-3	
(United Kingdom) Simpson Motorsport	Audi RS 3 LMS TCR (2017)	Volkswagen EA888 2.0 L I4	138	(United Arab Emirates) Ahmed Al Khaja	3	
(United Kingdom) Simpson Motorsport	Audi RS 3 LMS TCR (2017)	Volkswagen EA888 2.0 L I4	138	(United Kingdom) Kavi Jundu	3	
(United Kingdom) Simpson Motorsport	Audi RS 3 LMS TCR (2017)	Volkswagen EA888 2.0 L I4	138	(United Kingdom) Oliver Webb	3	
(United Kingdom) Simpson Motorsport	Audi RS 3 LMS TCR (2017)	Volkswagen EA888 2.0 L I4	138	(United Arab Emirates) Nadir Zuhour	3	
(Belgium) AC Motorsport	Audi RS 3 LMS TCR (2021)	Volkswagen EA888 2.0 L I4	188	(United Kingdom) James Kaye	2–3	
(Belgium) AC Motorsport	Audi RS 3 LMS TCR (2021)	Volkswagen EA888 2.0 L I4	188	(Latvia) Ivars Vallers	2–3	
(Belgium) AC Motorsport	Audi RS 3 LMS TCR (2021)	Volkswagen EA888 2.0 L I4	188	(France) Thierry Chkondali	3	
(Belgium) AC Motorsport	Audi RS 3 LMS TCR (2021)	Volkswagen EA888 2.0 L I4	188	(Belgium) Kobe Pauwels	3	
(Belgium) AC Motorsport	Audi RS 3 LMS TCR (2021)	Volkswagen EA888 2.0 L I4	188	(Netherlands) Paul Sieljes	3	
TCX
(Luxembourg) Race Track Competition	Lamera GT	Volvo 2.5 L I5	223	(Luxembourg) Gilles Bruckner	2	
(Luxembourg) Race Track Competition	Lamera GT	Volvo 2.5 L I5	223	(France) Daniel Lamouli	2	
(Luxembourg) Race Track Competition	Lamera GT	Volvo 2.5 L I5	223	(Luxembourg) Tommy Rollinger	2	
(Italy) Lotus PB Racing	Lotus Elise Cup PB-R	Toyota 1.4 L I4	226	(Italy) Maurizio Copetti	3	
(Italy) Lotus PB Racing	Lotus Elise Cup PB-R	Toyota 1.4 L I4	226	(Italy) Stefano d'Aste	3	
(Italy) Lotus PB Racing	Lotus Elise Cup PB-R	Toyota 1.4 L I4	226	(Italy) Stefano Moretti	3	
(Italy) Lotus PB Racing	Lotus Elise Cup PB-R	Toyota 1.4 L I4	226	(Monaco) Vito Utzieri	3	
(Germany) SRS Team Sorg Rennsport	Porsche 718 Cayman GT4 Clubsport	Porsche 4.0 L Flat-6	227	(Switzerland) Gero Bauknecht	3	
(Germany) SRS Team Sorg Rennsport	Porsche 718 Cayman GT4 Clubsport	Porsche 4.0 L Flat-6	227	(United States) José Garcia	3	
(Germany) SRS Team Sorg Rennsport	Porsche 718 Cayman GT4 Clubsport	Porsche 4.0 L Flat-6	227	(Germany) Patrick Kolb	3	
(Germany) SRS Team Sorg Rennsport	Porsche 718 Cayman GT4 Clubsport	Porsche 4.0 L Flat-6	227	(Germany) Christoph Krombach	3	
(Germany) SRS Team Sorg Rennsport	Porsche 718 Cayman GT4 Clubsport	Porsche 4.0 L Flat-6	227	(Mexico) Benito Tagle	3	
(United Kingdom) CWS Engineering	Ginetta G55 Supercup	Ford Cyclone 3.7 L V6	277	(United Kingdom) Colin White	2–3	
(United Kingdom) CWS Engineering	Ginetta G55 Supercup	Ford Cyclone 3.7 L V6	277	(United Kingdom) Owen Hizzey	2	
(United Kingdom) CWS Engineering	Ginetta G55 Supercup	Ford Cyclone 3.7 L V6	277	(United Kingdom) Dale Albutt	2	
(United Kingdom) CWS Engineering	Ginetta G55 Supercup	Ford Cyclone 3.7 L V6	277	(Spain) Christian Broberg	3	
(United Kingdom) CWS Engineering	Ginetta G55 Supercup	Ford Cyclone 3.7 L V6	277	(United Kingdom) Tom Holland	3	
(United Kingdom) CWS Engineering	Ginetta G55 Supercup	Ford Cyclone 3.7 L V6	277	(Australia) Mark Griffith	3	
(United Kingdom) CWS Engineering	Ginetta G55 Supercup	Ford Cyclone 3.7 L V6	277	(United Kingdom) JM Littman	3	
(United Kingdom) CWS Engineering	Ginetta G55 Supercup	Ford Cyclone 3.7 L V6	278	(United Kingdom) Colin White	All	
(United Kingdom) CWS Engineering	Ginetta G55 Supercup	Ford Cyclone 3.7 L V6	278	(Spain) Christian Broberg	1	
(United Kingdom) CWS Engineering	Ginetta G55 Supercup	Ford Cyclone 3.7 L V6	278	(Australia) Neale Muston	1	
(United Kingdom) CWS Engineering	Ginetta G55 Supercup	Ford Cyclone 3.7 L V6	278	(Australia) Mark Griffith	2–3	
(United Kingdom) CWS Engineering	Ginetta G55 Supercup	Ford Cyclone 3.7 L V6	278	(United Kingdom) Owen Hizzey	3	
(United Kingdom) CWS Engineering	Ginetta G55 Supercup	Ford Cyclone 3.7 L V6	278	(United Kingdom) Tom Holland	3	
(United Kingdom) CWS Engineering	Ginetta G55 Supercup	Ford Cyclone 3.7 L V6	278	(United Kingdom) Daniel Morris	3	

GT3 entries
Icon	Class
P	GT3-Pro
PA	GT3-Pro Am
Am	GT3-Am
992 entries
Icon	Class
P	992-Pro
Am	992-Am

== Race results ==
Bold indicates overall winner.

Event	Circuit	GT3-Pro Winners	GT3-Pro Am Winners	GT3-Am Winners	GTX Winners	992-Pro Winners	992-Am Winners	GT4 Winners	TCR Winners	TCX Winners	Report
1	Kuwait Motor Town	(United Arab Emirates) No. 95 Manamauri Energy by Ebimotors	(United Kingdom) No. 22 Century Motorsport	**(United States) No. 85 CP Racing**	(United Kingdom) No. 795 Toro Verde GT	(Netherlands) No. 909 Red Camel-Jordans.nl	(Germany) No. 937 KKrämer Racing	(United Kingdom) No. 438 AGMC Racing Team by Simpson Motorsport	(United Kingdom) No. 138 Simpson Motorsport	(United Kingdom) No. 278 CWS Engineering	Report
1	Kuwait Motor Town	(Italy) Fabrizio Broggi (Italy) Sabino de Castro (Romania) Sergiu Nicolae (Italy) Cosimo Papi	(United Kingdom) Jack Barlow (United Kingdom) Carl Cavers (United Kingdom) Lewis Plato	**(United States) Charles Espenlaub** **(United States) Joe Foster** **(United States) Shane Lewis** **(United States) Charles Putman**	(United Kingdom) Mike Simpson (United Kingdom) Freddie Tomlinson (United Kingdom) Lawrence Tomlinson	(Netherlands) Ivo Breukers (Netherlands) Luc Breukers (Netherlands) Rik Breukers (Switzerland) Fabian Danz	(Germany) Michele di Martino (Germany) Karsten Krämer (Kyrgyzstan) "Selv"	(Belgium) Fabian Duffieux (Kyrgyzstan) Andrey Solukovtsev (Cyprus) Vasily Vladykin	(United Kingdom) Ricky Coomber (United Kingdom) James Kaye (United Kingdom) Jack Lemmer (United Kingdom) Henry Neal (Cyprus) Vasily Vladykin	(Spain) Christian Broberg (Australia) Neale Muston (United Kingdom) Colin White	Report
2	(United Arab Emirates) Yas Marina Circuit	(Germany) No. 99 Attempto Racing	**(Germany) No. 96 Car Collection Motorsport**	(Austria) No. 86 Baron Motorsport	(France) No. 701 Vortex V8	(Netherlands) No. 909 Red Camel-Jordans.nl	No. 931 QMMF by HRT Suhail Qatar	(United Kingdom) No. 429 Century Motorsport	(Belgium) No. 188 AC Motorsport	(United Kingdom) No. 277 CWS Engineering	Report
2	(United Arab Emirates) Yas Marina Circuit	(Germany) Alex Aka (Belgium) Jef Machiels (Germany) Florian Scholze	**(United States) Dustin Blattner** **(Netherlands) Loek Hartog** **(Germany) Dennis Marschall**	(Austria) Philipp Baron (Zimbabwe) Axcil Jefferies (Austria) Ernst Kirchmayr	(France) Lionel Amrouche (France) Philippe Bonnel (France) Arnaud Gomez (France) Olivier Gomez	(Netherlands) Ivo Breukers (Netherlands) Luc Breukers (Switzerland) Fabian Danz	(Qatar) Ibrahim Al-Abdulghani (Qatar) Abdulla Ali Al-Khelaifi (Qatar) Ghanim Ali Al Maadheed (Germany) Julian Hanses	(United Kingdom) Ravi Ramyead (United Kingdom) Charlie Robertson	(United Kingdom) James Kaye (Latvia) Ivar Vallers	(United Kingdom) Dale Albutt (United Kingdom) Owen Hizzey (United Kingdom) Colin White	Report
3	(United Arab Emirates) Dubai Autodrome	**(Austria) No. 54 Eastalent Racing Team**	(United Kingdom) No. 22 Century Motorsport	(United Kingdom) No. 14 Century Motorsport	(United Kingdom) No. 795 Toro Verde GT	(Netherlands) No. 909 Red Camel-Jordans.nl	No. 931 QMMF by HRT Suhail Qatar	(United Arab Emirates) No. 496 Continental Racing	(United Kingdom) No. 138 Simpson Motorsport	(United Kingdom) No. 278 CWS Engineering	Report
3	(United Arab Emirates) Dubai Autodrome	**(Germany) Christopher Haase** **(Belgium) Gilles Magnus** **(Austria) Simon Reicher** **(Germany) Markus Winkelhock** **(China) Mike Zhou**	(United Kingdom) Jack Barlow (United Kingdom) Carl Cavers (United Kingdom) Lewis Plato (United Kingdom) Jake Rattenbury	(Indonesia) Sean Gelael (Australia) Michael Johnston (United Kingdom) Darren Leung (United Kingdom) Christopher Salkeld	(France) Nico Prost (United Kingdom) Mike Simpson (United Kingdom) Freddie Tomlinson (United Kingdom) Lawrence Tomlinson	(Netherlands) Ivo Breukers (Netherlands) Luc Breukers (Netherlands) Rik Breukers (Switzerland) Fabian Danz	(Qatar) Ibrahim Al-Abdulghani (Qatar) Abdulla Ali Al-Khelaifi (Qatar) Ghanim Ali Al Maadheed (Germany) Julian Hanses	(Kyrgyzstan) Andrey Solukovtsev (Cyprus) Vasily Vladykin (United Arab Emirates) Ahmed Al Khaja; Mikhail Loboda; David Pogosyan	(United Arab Emirates) Ahmed Al Khaja (United Kingdom) Kavi Jundu; Andrei Muraveika (United Kingdom) Oliver Webb (United Arab Emirates) Nadir Zuhour	(Australia) Mark Griffith (United Kingdom) Owen Hizzey (United Kingdom) Tom Holland (United Kingdom) Daniel Morris (United Kingdom) Colin White	Report

== Championship standings ==
=== Points system ===
Teams and drivers must race in at least 2 (two) events to be eligible for championship.

Position	**1st**	**2nd**	**3rd**	**4th**	**5th**	**6th**	**7th**	**8th**	**9th**	**10th**	**11th**	**12th**	**13th**	**14th**	**15th**
Points	40	36	32	28	24	20	18	16	14	12	10	8	6	4	2

=== GT3 Drivers' ===
Pos.	Drivers	Team	(Kuwait) KUW	(United Arab Emirates) ABU	(United Arab Emirates) DUB	Pts.
1	(Italy) Fabrizio Broggi (Italy) Sabino de Castro (Romania) Sergiu Nicolae (Italy) Cosimo Papi	(United Arab Emirates) No. 95 Manamauri Energy by Ebimotors	2	3		68
2	(United States) Charles Espenlaub (United States) Joe Foster (United States) Shane Lewis (United States) Charles Putman	(United States) No. 85 CP Racing	**1**	6		60
3	(United States) Dustin Blattner (Netherlands) Loek Hartog (Germany) Dennis Marschall	(Germany) No. 96 Car Collection Motorsport		1		40
4	(United Kingdom) Jack Barlow (United Kingdom) Lewis Plato	(United Kingdom) No. 22 Century Motorsport	3	37†		36
4	(Austria) Philipp Baron (Zimbabwe) Axcil Jefferies (Austria) Ernst Kirchmayr	(United Arab Emirates) No. 86 Baron Motorsport		2		36
5	(United Kingdom) Carl Cavers	(United Kingdom) No. 22 Century Motorsport	3	37†		32
6	(Germany) Alex Aka (Belgium) Jef Machiels (Germany) Florian Scholze	(Germany) No. 99 Attempto Racing		4		28
7	(Hong Kong) Antares Au (Germany) Ralf Bohn (Germany) Alfred Renauer	(Germany) No. 91 Herberth Motorsport		5		24
8	(Armenia) Artur Goroyan (Armenia) Roman Mavlanov (Germany) Markus Winkelhock	(Armenia) No. 80 Goroyan RT by Car Collection Motorsport		7		18
9	(Belgium) Mathieu Detry (Germany) Thomas Kiefer (Germany) Torsten Kratz (Kyrgyzstan) Stanislav Minsky	(Antigua and Barbuda) No. 21 HAAS RT		**8**		16
10	(Germany) Marc Bartels (Germany) Finn Gehrsitz (Germany) Tim Zimmermann	(Germany) No. 50 Huber Motorsport		9		14
11	(United Kingdom) Euan Hankey (United Kingdom) James Kell (United Kingdom) Lucky Khera (United States) Thomas Surgent	(United Kingdom) No. 13 Race Lab		11		12
12	(Czech Republic) Petr Fulín (Slovakia) Miro Konôpka (Slovakia) Zdeno Mikulasko	(Slovakia) No. 44 ARC Bratislava		17		10
13	(Netherlands) Peter Kox (Netherlands) Stéphane Kox (Netherlands) Nico Pronk	(United Arab Emirates) No. 48 S'Aalocin by Kox Racing		18		8
14	(Australia) Brenton Grove (Australia) Stephen Grove (Australia) Jordan Love	(Australia) No. 10 EBM – Grove Racing		34		6
	(Italy) Edoardo Bacci (Lebanon) Masoud Jaberian (Italy) Alessandro Tonoli	(Antigua and Barbuda) No. 92 HAAS RT		Ret		0
Pos.	Drivers	Team	(Kuwait) KUW	(United Arab Emirates) ABU	(United Arab Emirates) DUB	Pts.

Colour	Result
Gold	Winner
Silver	Second place
Bronze	Third place
Green	Points classification
Blue	Non-points classification
Blue	Non-classified finish (NC)
Purple	Retired, not classified (Ret)
Red	Did not qualify (DNQ)
Red	Did not pre-qualify (DNPQ)
Black	Disqualified (DSQ)
White	Did not start (DNS)
White	Withdrew (WD)
White	Race cancelled (C)
Blank	Did not practice (DNP)
Blank	Did not arrive (DNA)
Blank	Excluded (EX)

**Bold** – Pole
Italics – Fastest Lap

† – Drivers did not finish the race, but were classified as they completed over 50% of the class winner's race distance.

=== GT3 Teams' ===
Pos.	Team	(Kuwait) KUW	(United Arab Emirates) ABU	(United Arab Emirates) DUB	Pts.
1	(United Arab Emirates) No. 95 Manamauri Energy by Ebimotors	2	3	4	68 (96)
2	(United Kingdom) No. 22 Century Motorsport	3	37†	3	64 (68)
3	(Germany) No. 96 Car Collection Motorsport		1	5	60
3	(United States) No. 85 CP Racing	**1**	6	26	60 (68)
4	(Germany) No. 99 Attempto Racing		4	31†	34
5	(Antigua and Barbuda) No. 21 HAAS RT		**8**	8	32
6	(Germany) No. 50 Huber Motorsport		9	9	28
7	(Germany) No. 91 Herberth Motorsport		5	Ret	24
8	(United Arab Emirates) No. 48 S'Aalocin by Kox Racing		18	Ret	8
9	(Australia) No. 10 EBM – Grove Racing		34	Ret	6
One-offs ineligible for championship
	(Austria) No. 54 Eastalent Racing Team			1	(40)
	(United Arab Emirates) No. 86 Baron Motorsport		2		(36)
	(Germany) No. 83 Proton Huber Competition			2	(36)
	(United Kingdom) No. 14 Century Motorsport			5	(24)
	(Armenia) No. 80 Goroyan RT by Car Collection Motorsport		7		(18)
	(France) No. 26 Saintéloc Junior Team			7	(18)
	(United Kingdom) No. 13 Race Lab		11		(12)
	(United Kingdom) No. 31 Team Parker Racing			10	(12)
	(Slovakia) No. 44 ARC Bratislava		17		(10)
	(United States) No. 27 Heart of Racing by SPS			18	(10)
	(Germany) No. 17 MRS GT-Racing			39	(4)
	(Germany) GetSpeed Performance			44†	(2)
	(Antigua and Barbuda) No. 92 HAAS RT		Ret		0
	(Germany) No. 6 racing one			Ret	0
	(United Kingdom) No. 76 7TSIX			Ret	0
	(United Arab Emirates) No. 88 ROFGO with Dragon Racing			**Ret**	0
	(France) No. 18 Saintéloc Junior Team			Ret	0
-	(Germany) No. 63 Leipert Motorsport			DNS	-
Pos.	Team	(Kuwait) KUW	(United Arab Emirates) ABU	(United Arab Emirates) DUB	Pts.

=== GT3-Pro Am Drivers' ===
Pos.	Drivers	Team	(Kuwait) KUW	(United Arab Emirates) ABU	(United Arab Emirates) DUB	Pts.
1	(United Kingdom) Jack Barlow (United Kingdom) Lewis Plato	(United Kingdom) No. 22 Century Motorsport	**3**	37†		64
2	(United States) Dustin Blattner (Netherlands) Loek Hartog (Germany) Dennis Marschall	(Germany) No. 96 Car Collection Motorsport		**1**		40
2	(United Kingdom) Carl Cavers	(United Kingdom) No. 22 Century Motorsport	**3**	37†		40
3	(Italy) Fabrizio Broggi (Italy) Sabino de Castro (Romania) Sergiu Nicolae (Italy) Cosimo Papi	(United Arab Emirates) No. 95 Manamauri Energy by Ebimotors		3		36
4	(United Kingdom) Euan Hankey (United Kingdom) James Kell (United Kingdom) Lucky Khera (United States) Thomas Surgent	(United Kingdom) No. 13 Race Lab		11		32
5	(Australia) Brenton Grove (Australia) Stephen Grove (Australia) Jordan Love	(Australia) No. 10 EBM – Grove Racing		34		28
	(Italy) Edoardo Bacci (Lebanon) Masoud Jaberian (Italy) Alessandro Tonoli	(Antigua and Barbuda) No. 92 HAAS RT		Ret		0
Pos.	Drivers	Team	(Kuwait) KUW	(United Arab Emirates) ABU	(United Arab Emirates) DUB	Pts.

=== GT3-Pro Am Teams' ===
Pos.	Team	(Kuwait) KUW	(United Arab Emirates) ABU	(United Arab Emirates) DUB	Pts.
1	(United Kingdom) No. 22 Century Motorsport	**3**	37†	3	80 (104)
2	(Germany) No. 96 Car Collection Motorsport		**1**	6	72
2	(United Arab Emirates) No. 95 Manamauri Energy by Ebimotors		3	4	72
One-offs ineligible for championship
	(United Kingdom) No. 13 Race Lab		11		(32)
	(Australia) No. 10 EBM – Grove Racing		34		(28)
	(United Kingdom) No. 31 Team Parker Racing			10	(28)
	(United States) No. 27 Heart of Racing by SPS			18	(24)
	(Antigua and Barbuda) No. 92 HAAS RT		Ret		0
	(Germany) No. 6 racing one			Ret	0
	(United Kingdom) No. 76 7TSIX			Ret	0
	(Germany) No. 91 Herberth Motorsport			Ret	0
	(France) No. 18 Saintéloc Junior Team			Ret	0
-	(Germany) No. 63 Leipert Motorsport			DNS	-
Pos.	Team	(Kuwait) KUW	(United Arab Emirates) ABU	(United Arab Emirates) DUB	Pts.

=== GT3-Am Drivers' ===
Pos.	Drivers	Team	(Kuwait) KUW	(United Arab Emirates) ABU	(United Arab Emirates) DUB	Pts.
1	(United States) Charles Espenlaub (United States) Joe Foster (United States) Shane Lewis (United States) Charles Putman	(United States) No. 85 CP Racing	**1**	6		72
2	(Austria) Philipp Baron (Zimbabwe) Axcil Jefferies (Austria) Ernst Kirchmayr	(United Arab Emirates) No. 86 Baron Motorsport		2		40
3	(Hong Kong) Antares Au (Germany) Ralf Bohn (Germany) Alfred Renauer	(Germany) No. 91 Herberth Motorsport		5		36
4	(Belgium) Mathieu Detry (Germany) Thomas Kiefer (Germany) Torsten Kratz (Kyrgyzstan) Stanislav Minsky	(Antigua and Barbuda) No. 21 HAAS RT		**8**		28
5	(Czech Republic) Petr Fulín (Slovakia) Miro Konôpka (Slovakia) Zdeno Mikulasko	(Slovakia) No. 44 ARC Bratislava		17		24
6	(Netherlands) Peter Kox (Netherlands) Stéphane Kox (Netherlands) Nico Pronk	(United Arab Emirates) No. 48 S'Aalocin by Kox Racing		18		20
Pos.	Drivers	Team	(Kuwait) KUW	(United Arab Emirates) ABU	(United Arab Emirates) DUB	Pts.

=== GT3-Am Teams' ===
Pos.	Team	(Kuwait) KUW	(United Arab Emirates) ABU	(United Arab Emirates) DUB	Pts.
1	(United States) No. 85 CP Racing	**1**	6	26	72 (96)
2	(Antigua and Barbuda) No. 21 HAAS RT		**8**	8	60
3	(United Arab Emirates) No. 48 S'Aalocin by Kox Racing		18	Ret	20
One-offs ineligible for championship
	(United Arab Emirates) No. 86 Baron Motorsport		2		(40)
	(United Kingdom) No. 14 Century Motorsport			5	(40)
	(Germany) No. 91 Herberth Motorsport		5		(36)
	(France) No. 26 Saintéloc Junior Team			7	(36)
	(Germany) No. 50 Huber Motorsport			9	(28)
	(Slovakia) No. 44 ARC Bratislava		17		(24)
	(Germany) No. 17 MRS GT-Racing			39	(20)
Pos.	Team	(Kuwait) KUW	(United Arab Emirates) ABU	(United Arab Emirates) DUB	Pts.

=== GTX Drivers' ===
Pos.	Drivers	Team	(Kuwait) KUW	(United Arab Emirates) ABU	(United Arab Emirates) DUB	Pts.
1	(France) Lionel Amrouche (France) Philippe Bonnel (France) Arnaud Gomez (France) Olivier Gomez	(France) No. 701 Vortex V8	**13**	**19**		72
2	(Poland) Arthur Chwist (Austria) Daniel Drexel	(Austria) No. 714 Razoon – More than Racing	10	35		64
3	(United Kingdom) Mike Simpson (United Kingdom) Freddie Tomlinson (United Kingdom) Lawrence Tomlinson	(United Kingdom) No. 795 Toro Verde GT	7	Ret		40
4	(Austria) Dominik Olbert (Kuwait) Haytham Qarajouli	(Austria) No. 714 Razoon – More than Racing	10			36
4	(Canada) Keith Frieser (Denmark) Mikkel Mac	(United Kingdom) No. 750 Scott Sport		20		36
5	(Portugal) José Monroy (Portugal) Rui Miritta (Brazil) "BigGeorge"	(Portugal) No. 721 P21 Motorsport		31		32
6	(Austria) Denis Liebl	(Austria) No. 714 Razoon – More than Racing		35		28
7	(United States) Gregg Gorski (New Zealand) Brendon Leitch (United States) Gerhard Watzinger	(United States) No. 710 Leipert Motorsport		38†		24
8	(Portugal) Alexandre Fonseca (Portugal) Kika Queiroz	(Portugal) No. 715 P21 Motorsport		39†		20
9	(Portugal) Rúben Costa	(Portugal) No. 721 P21 Motorsport		31		0
Pos.	Drivers	Team	(Kuwait) KUW	(United Arab Emirates) ABU	(United Arab Emirates) DUB	Pts.

=== GTX Teams' ===
Pos.	Team	(Kuwait) KUW	(United Arab Emirates) ABU	(United Arab Emirates) DUB	Pts.
1	(United Kingdom) No. 795 Toro Verde GT	7	Ret	20	80
2	(France) No. 701 Vortex V8	**13**	**19**	**30**	76
3	(Austria) No. 714 Razoon – More than Racing	10	35	38†	68
-	(United Kingdom) No. 750 Scott Sport		20		-
-	(Portugal) No. 721 P21 Motorsport		31		-
-	(United States) No. 710 Leipert Motorsport		38†		-
-	(Portugal) No. 715 P21 Motorsport		39†		-
Pos.	Team	(Kuwait) KUW	(United Arab Emirates) ABU	(United Arab Emirates) DUB	Pts.

=== 992 Drivers' ===
Pos.	Drivers	Team	(Kuwait) KUW	(United Arab Emirates) ABU	(United Arab Emirates) DUB	Pts.
1	(Netherlands) Ivo Breukers (Netherlands) Luc Breukers (Switzerland) Fabian Danz	(Netherlands) No. 909 Red Camel-Jordans.nl	**4**	**10**		80
2	(United Arab Emirates) Saif Alameri (Austria) Christopher Zöchling	(United Arab Emirates) No. 971 RABDAN by Fulgenzi Racing	5	13		68
3	(Germany) Michele di Martino (Kyrgyzstan) "Selv"	(Germany) No. 936 KKrämer Racing	6	14		60
4	(Germany) Karsten Krämer	(Germany) No. 936 KKrämer Racing	6			48
4	(Germany) Karsten Krämer	(Germany) No. 937 KKrämer Racing		22		48
5	(Netherlands) Rik Breukers	(Netherlands) No. 909 Red Camel-Jordans.nl	**4**			40
6	(Italy) Enrico Fulgenzi	(United Arab Emirates) No. 971 RABDAN by Fulgenzi Racing	5			36
6	(Qatar) Ibrahim Al-Abdulghani (Qatar) Abdulla Ali Al-Khelaifi (Qatar) Ghanim Ali Al Maadheed (Germany) Julian Hanses	No. 931 QMMF by HRT Suhail Qatar		12		36
7	(Germany) Moritz Kranz (Germany) Tobias Müller	(Germany) No. 936 KKrämer Racing	6			32
7	(United Arab Emirates) Salem Alketbi	(United Arab Emirates) No. 971 RABDAN by Fulgenzi Racing		13		32
8	(Germany) Fidel Leib (Germany) Alexej Veremenko	(Germany) No. 936 KKrämer Racing		14		28
9	(Netherlands) Gjis Bessem (Netherlands) Harry Hilders	(Netherlands) No. 992 NKPP Racing by Bas Koeten		15		24
10	(Netherlands) Tom Coronel (Netherlands) Jan Jaap van Roon	(Netherlands) No. 965 MDM Ireckonu		16		20
11	Alexey Denisov (Austria) Felix Neuhofer (Austria) Markus Neuhofer	(Germany) No. 988 Neuhofer Rennsport by MRS GT-Racing		21		18
12	(Australia) Cameron McLeod (Germany) Etienne Ploenes (Italy) Mark "Speakerwas"	(Germany) No. 937 KKrämer Racing		22		16
13	(France) Vladislav Lomko (United States) Bryan Sircely (Germany) Peter Terting	(Belgium) No. 921 Mühlner Motorsport		23		14
14	(France) Sebastien Lajoux (Belgium) Benjamin Paque (France) Stéphane Perrin	(France) No. 908 SebLajoux Racing by DUWO Racing		24		12
15	(United Kingdom) Steven Liquorish (United Kingdom) Graeme Mundy (France) Gilles Vannelet	(United Arab Emirates) No. 918 PRP Motorsports with HRT		32		10
Pos.	Drivers	Team	(Kuwait) KUW	(United Arab Emirates) ABU	(United Arab Emirates) DUB	Pts.

=== 992 Teams' ===
Pos.	Team	(Kuwait) KUW	(United Arab Emirates) ABU	(United Arab Emirates) DUB	Pts.
1	(Netherlands) No. 909 Red Camel-Jordans.nl	**4**	**10**	11	80
2	No. 931 QMMF by HRT Suhail Qatar		12	12	72
3	(United Arab Emirates) No. 971 RABDAN by Fulgenzi Racing	5	13	16	68
4	(Germany) No. 936 KKrämer Racing	6	14	41	60
5	(Germany) No. 937 KKrämer Racing; No. 937 SMP Racing	14	22	**23**	44
6	(Netherlands) No. 992 NKPP Racing by Bas Koeten		15	17	42
7	(Germany) No. 988 Neuhofer Rennsport by MRS GT-Racing		21	43†	18
8	(France) No. 908 SebLajoux Racing by DUWO Racing		24	32†	16
8	(Belgium) No. 921 Mühlner Motorsport		23	36	16
-	(Switzerland) No. 962 Fach Auto Tech			13	-
-	(Belgium) No. 903 Red Ant Racing			14	-
-	(Germany) No. 907 RPM Racing			15	-
-	(Netherlands) No. 965 MDM Ireckonu		16		-
-	(Germany) No. 929 HRT Performance			19	-
-	(Germany) No. 901 PROsport Racing			21	-
-	(Netherlands) No. 925 Team Captain America by Bas Koeten Racing			22	-
-	(United Arab Emirates) No. 918 PRP Motorsports with HRT		32		-
-	(Germany) No. 930 HRT Performance			24	-
-	(Switzerland) No. 961 Fach Auto Tech			25	-
-	(Denmark) No. 902 Holmgaard Motorsport			37	-
-	(Germany) No. 989 MRS GT-Racing			39	-
-	(Germany) No. 927 SRS Team Sorg Rennsport			Ret	-
Pos.	Team	(Kuwait) KUW	(United Arab Emirates) ABU	(United Arab Emirates) DUB	Pts.

=== 992-Am Drivers' ===
Pos.	Drivers	Team	(Kuwait) KUW	(United Arab Emirates) ABU	(United Arab Emirates) DUB	Pts.
1	(Qatar) Ibrahim Al-Abdulghani (Qatar) Abdulla Ali Al-Khelaifi (Qatar) Ghanim Ali Al Maadheed (Germany) Julian Hanses	No. 931 QMMF by HRT Suhail Qatar		12		40
2	(United Arab Emirates) Saif Alameri (United Arab Emirates) Salem Alketbi (Austria) Christopher Zöchling	(United Arab Emirates) No. 971 RABDAN by Fulgenzi Racing		**13**		36
3	(Germany) Michele di Martino (Kyrgyzstan) "Selv"	(Germany) No. 937 KKrämer Racing	**14**			32
3	(Germany) Michele di Martino (Kyrgyzstan) "Selv"	(Germany) No. 936 KKrämer Racing		14		32
3	(Germany) Fidel Leib (Germany) Alexej Veremenko	(Germany) No. 936 KKrämer Racing		14		32
4	(Netherlands) Gjis Bessem (Netherlands) Harry Hilders	(Netherlands) No. 992 NKPP Racing by Bas Koeten		15		28
5	Alexey Denisov (Austria) Felix Neuhofer (Austria) Markus Neuhofer	(Germany) No. 988 Neuhofer Rennsport by MRS GT-Racing		21		24
6	(France) Sebastien Lajoux (Belgium) Benjamin Paque (France) Stéphane Perrin	(France) No. 908 SebLajoux Racing by DUWO Racing		24		20
7	(United Kingdom) Steven Liquorish (United Kingdom) Graeme Mundy (France) Gilles Vannelet	(United Arab Emirates) No. 918 PRP Motorsports with HRT		32		18
	(Germany) Karsten Krämer	(Germany) No. 937 KKrämer Racing	**14**			
Pos.	Drivers	Team	(Kuwait) KUW	(United Arab Emirates) ABU	(United Arab Emirates) DUB	Pts.

=== 992-Am Teams' ===
Pos.	Team	(Kuwait) KUW	(United Arab Emirates) ABU	(United Arab Emirates) DUB	Pts.
1	No. 931 QMMF by HRT Suhail Qatar		12	12	80
2	(United Arab Emirates) No. 971 RABDAN by Fulgenzi Racing		**13**	16	68
3	(Netherlands) No. 992 NKPP Racing by Bas Koeten		15	17	56
4	(Germany) No. 936 KKrämer Racing		14	32†	42
5	(France) No. 908 SebLajoux Racing by DUWO Racing		24	41	34
-	(Germany) No. 937 KKrämer Racing	**14**			-
-	(Germany) No. 907 RPM Racing			15	-
-	(Germany) No. 988 Neuhofer Rennsport by MRS GT-Racing		21		-
-	(Germany) No. 901 PROsport Racing			21	-
-	(Netherlands) No. 925 Team Captain America by Bas Koeten Racing			**22**	-
-	(United Arab Emirates) No. 918 PRP Motorsports with HRT		32		-
-	(Germany) No. 930 HRT Performance			24	-
-	(Switzerland) No. 961 Fach Auto Tech			25	-
-	(Germany) No. 989 MRS GT-Racing			39	-
-	(Germany) No. 927 SRS Team Sorg Rennsport			Ret	-
Pos.	Team	(Kuwait) KUW	(United Arab Emirates) ABU	(United Arab Emirates) DUB	Pts.

=== GT4 Drivers' ===
Pos.	Drivers	Team	(Kuwait) KUW	(United Arab Emirates) ABU	(United Arab Emirates) DUB	Pts.
1	(United Kingdom) Ravi Ramyead (United Kingdom) Charlie Robertson	(United Kingdom) No. 429 Century Motorsport	**9**	**25**		76
1	(Belgium) Fabian Duffieux	(United Kingdom) No. 438 AGMC Racing Team by Simpson Motorsport	8	26		76
2	(Kyrgyzstan) Andrey Solukovtsev (Cyprus) Vasily Vladykin	(United Kingdom) No. 438 AGMC Racing Team by Simpson Motorsport	8			68
2	(Kyrgyzstan) Andrey Solukovtsev (Cyprus) Vasily Vladykin	(United Arab Emirates) No. 496 Continental Racing		28		68
3	(United Kingdom) Tim Docker (Kyrgyzstan) Ivan Krapivtsev	(United Kingdom) No. 438 AGMC Racing Team by Simpson Motorsport		26		36
3	(United Kingdom) Nathan Freke (United Kingdom) David Holloway	(United Kingdom) No. 429 Century Motorsport	**9**			36
4	(United Kingdom) Samuel Harrison (United Kingdom) Kavi Jundu (United Kingdom) Michael O'Brien (United Kingdom) Benjamin Tusting	(United Kingdom) No. 423 Toyota Gazoo Racing UK		27		32
5	(United Arab Emirates) Ahmed Al Khaja	(United Arab Emirates) No. 496 Continental Racing		28		28
	(Canada) Ramez Azzam (Germany) Denis Bulatov (United States) Keith Gatehouse	(United Arab Emirates) No. 408 GPM Racing by Dragon		Ret		0
Pos.	Drivers	Team	(Kuwait) KUW	(United Arab Emirates) ABU	(United Arab Emirates) DUB	Pts.

=== GT4 Teams' ===
Pos.	Team	(Kuwait) KUW	(United Arab Emirates) ABU	(United Arab Emirates) DUB	Pts.
1	(United Kingdom) No. 438 AGMC Racing Team by Simpson Motorsport	8	26	**35**†	76
1	(United Kingdom) No. 429 Century Motorsport	**9**	**25**	Ret	76
2	(United Arab Emirates) No. 496 Continental Racing		28	27	68
-	(United Kingdom) No. 423 Toyota Gazoo Racing UK		27		-
	(United Arab Emirates) No. 408 GPM Racing by Dragon		Ret		-
Pos.	Team	(Kuwait) KUW	(United Arab Emirates) ABU	(United Arab Emirates) DUB	Pts.

=== TCE Drivers' ===
Pos.	Drivers	Team	(Kuwait) KUW	(United Arab Emirates) ABU	(United Arab Emirates) DUB	Pts.
1	(United Kingdom) Colin White	(United Kingdom) No. 278 CWS Engineering	**12**		29	108
1	(United Kingdom) Colin White	(United Kingdom) No. 277 CWS Engineering		**30**		108
2	(United Kingdom) James Kaye	(United Kingdom) No. 138 Simpson Motorsport	11			100
2	(United Kingdom) James Kaye	(Belgium) No. 188 AC Motorsport		29	45†	100
3	(United Kingdom) Ricky Coomber	(United Kingdom) No. 138 Simpson Motorsport	11	33		72
3	Andrei Muraveika	(United Kingdom) No. 138 Simpson Motorsport		33	28	72
3	(United Kingdom) Owen Hizzey	(United Kingdom) No. 277 CWS Engineering		**30**		72
3	(United Kingdom) Owen Hizzey	(United Kingdom) No. 278 CWS Engineering			29	72
4	(Australia) Mark Griffith	(United Kingdom) No. 278 CWS Engineering		36	29	64
4	(Spain) Christian Broberg	(United Kingdom) No. 278 CWS Engineering	**12**			64
4	(Spain) Christian Broberg	(United Kingdom) No. 277 CWS Engineering			**40**	64
5	(Latvia) Ivars Vallers	(Belgium) No. 188 AC Motorsport		29	45†	60
6	(United Kingdom) Jack Lemmer (United Kingdom) Henry Neal (Cyprus) Vasily Vladykin	(United Kingdom) No. 138 Simpson Motorsport	11			40
6	(United Arab Emirates) Ahmed Al Khaja (United Kingdom) Kavi Jundu (United Kingdom) Oliver Webb (United Arab Emirates) Nadir Zuhour	(United Kingdom) No. 138 Simpson Motorsport			28	40
7	(Australia) Neale Muston	(United Kingdom) No. 278 CWS Engineering	**12**			36
7	(United Kingdom) Dale Albutt	(United Kingdom) No. 277 CWS Engineering		**30**		36
7	(United Kingdom) Tom Holland (United Kingdom) Daniel Morris	(United Kingdom) No. 278 CWS Engineering			29	36
8	(United Kingdom) Jason Garrett (Kyrgyzstan) Ivan Stanchin	(United Kingdom) No. 138 Simpson Motorsport		33		32
8	(Switzerland) Gero Bauknecht (United States) José Garcia (Germany) Patrick Kolb (Germany) Christoph Krombach (Mexico) Benito Tagle	(Germany) No. 227 SRS Team Sorg Rennsport			34†	32
9	(United Kingdom) JM Littman	(United Kingdom) No. 277 CWS Engineering			**40**	28
10	(Italy) Maurizio Copetti (Italy) Stefano d'Aste (Italy) Stefano Moretti (Monaco) Vito Utzieri	(Italy) No. 226 Lotus PB Racing			42	24
11	(France) Thierry Chkondali (Belgium) Kobe Pauwels (Netherlands) Paul Sieljes	(Belgium) No. 188 AC Motorsport			45†	20
	(Luxembourg) Gilles Bruckner (France) Daniel Lamouli (Luxembourg) Tommy Rollinger	(Luxembourg) No. 223 Race Track Competition		Ret		0
Pos.	Drivers	Team	(Kuwait) KUW	(United Arab Emirates) ABU	(United Arab Emirates) DUB	Pts.

=== TCE Teams' ===
Pos.	Team	(Kuwait) KUW	(United Arab Emirates) ABU	(United Arab Emirates) DUB	Pts.
1	(United Kingdom) No. 138 Simpson Motorsport	11	33	28	80
2	(United Kingdom) No. 278 CWS Engineering	**12**	36	**12**	72
3	(United Kingdom) No. 277 CWS Engineering		**30**	40	64
4	(Belgium) No. 188 AC Motorsport		29	45†	60
-	(Germany) No. 227 SRS Team Sorg Rennsport			34†	-
-	(Italy) No. 226 Lotus PB Racing			42	-
	(Luxembourg) No. 223 Race Track Competition		Ret		-
Pos.	Team	(Kuwait) KUW	(United Arab Emirates) ABU	(United Arab Emirates) DUB	Pts.

=== TCR Drivers' ===
Pos.	Drivers	Team	(Kuwait) KUW	(United Arab Emirates) ABU	(United Arab Emirates) DUB	Pts.
1	(United Kingdom) James Kaye	(United Kingdom) No. 138 Simpson Motorsport	**11**			116
1	(United Kingdom) James Kaye	(Belgium) No. 188 AC Motorsport		**29**	**45**†	116
2	(United Kingdom) Ricky Coomber	(United Kingdom) No. 138 Simpson Motorsport	**11**	33		76
2	Andrei Muraveika	(United Kingdom) No. 138 Simpson Motorsport		33	28	76
2	(Latvia) Ivars Vallers	(Belgium) No. 188 AC Motorsport		**29**	**45**†	76
3	(United Kingdom) Jack Lemmer (United Kingdom) Henry Neal (Cyprus) Vasily Vladykin	(United Kingdom) No. 138 Simpson Motorsport	**11**			40
3	(United Arab Emirates) Ahmed Al Khaja (United Kingdom) Kavi Jundu (United Kingdom) Oliver Webb (United Arab Emirates) Nadir Zuhour	(United Kingdom) No. 138 Simpson Motorsport			28	40
4	(United Kingdom) Jason Garrett (Kyrgyzstan) Ivan Stanchin	(United Kingdom) No. 138 Simpson Motorsport		33		36
4	(France) Thierry Chkondali (Belgium) Kobe Pauwels (Netherlands) Paul Sieljes	(Belgium) No. 188 AC Motorsport			**45**†	36
Pos.	Drivers	Team	(Kuwait) KUW	(United Arab Emirates) ABU	(United Arab Emirates) DUB	Pts.

=== TCR Teams' ===
Pos.	Team	(Kuwait) KUW	(United Arab Emirates) ABU	(United Arab Emirates) DUB	Pts.
1	(United Kingdom) No. 138 Simpson Motorsport	**11**	33	28	80
2	(Belgium) No. 188 AC Motorsport		**29**	**45**†	76
Pos.	Team	(Kuwait) KUW	(United Arab Emirates) ABU	(United Arab Emirates) DUB	Pts.

=== TCX Drivers' ===
Pos.	Drivers	Team	(Kuwait) KUW	(United Arab Emirates) ABU	(United Arab Emirates) DUB	Pts.
1	(United Kingdom) Colin White	(United Kingdom) No. 278 CWS Engineering	**12**		**29**	120
1	(United Kingdom) Colin White	(United Kingdom) No. 277 CWS Engineering		30		120
2	(United Kingdom) Owen Hizzey	(United Kingdom) No. 277 CWS Engineering		30		80
2	(United Kingdom) Owen Hizzey	(United Kingdom) No. 278 CWS Engineering			**29**	80
3	(Australia) Mark Griffith	(United Kingdom) No. 278 CWS Engineering		**36**	**29**	76
4	(Spain) Christian Broberg	(United Kingdom) No. 278 CWS Engineering	**12**			72
4	(Spain) Christian Broberg	(United Kingdom) No. 277 CWS Engineering			40	72
5	(Australia) Neale Muston	(United Kingdom) No. 278 CWS Engineering	**12**			40
5	(United Kingdom) Dale Albutt	(United Kingdom) No. 277 CWS Engineering		30		40
5	(United Kingdom) Tom Holland (United Kingdom) Daniel Morris	(United Kingdom) No. 278 CWS Engineering			**29**	40
6	(Switzerland) Gero Bauknecht (United States) José Garcia (Germany) Patrick Kolb (Germany) Christoph Krombach (Mexico) Benito Tagle	(Germany) No. 227 SRS Team Sorg Rennsport			34†	36
7	(United Kingdom) JM Littman	(United Kingdom) No. 277 CWS Engineering			40	32
8	(Italy) Maurizio Copetti (Italy) Stefano d'Aste (Italy) Stefano Moretti (Monaco) Vito Utzieri	(Italy) No. 226 Lotus PB Racing			42	28
	(Luxembourg) Gilles Bruckner (France) Daniel Lamouli (Luxembourg) Tommy Rollinger	(Luxembourg) No. 223 Race Track Competition		Ret		0
Pos.	Drivers	Team	(Kuwait) KUW	(United Arab Emirates) ABU	(United Arab Emirates) DUB	Pts.

=== TCX Teams' ===
Pos.	Team	(Kuwait) KUW	(United Arab Emirates) ABU	(United Arab Emirates) DUB	Pts.
1	(United Kingdom) No. 278 CWS Engineering	**12**	**36**	**29**	80
2	(United Kingdom) No. 277 CWS Engineering		30	40	72
-	(Germany) No. 227 SRS Team Sorg Rennsport			34†	-
-	(Italy) No. 226 Lotus PB Racing			42	-
	(Luxembourg) No. 223 Race Track Competition		Ret		-
Pos.	Team	(Kuwait) KUW	(United Arab Emirates) ABU	(United Arab Emirates) DUB	Pts.
