= 2024 6 Hours of Abu Dhabi =

Endurance automotive competition

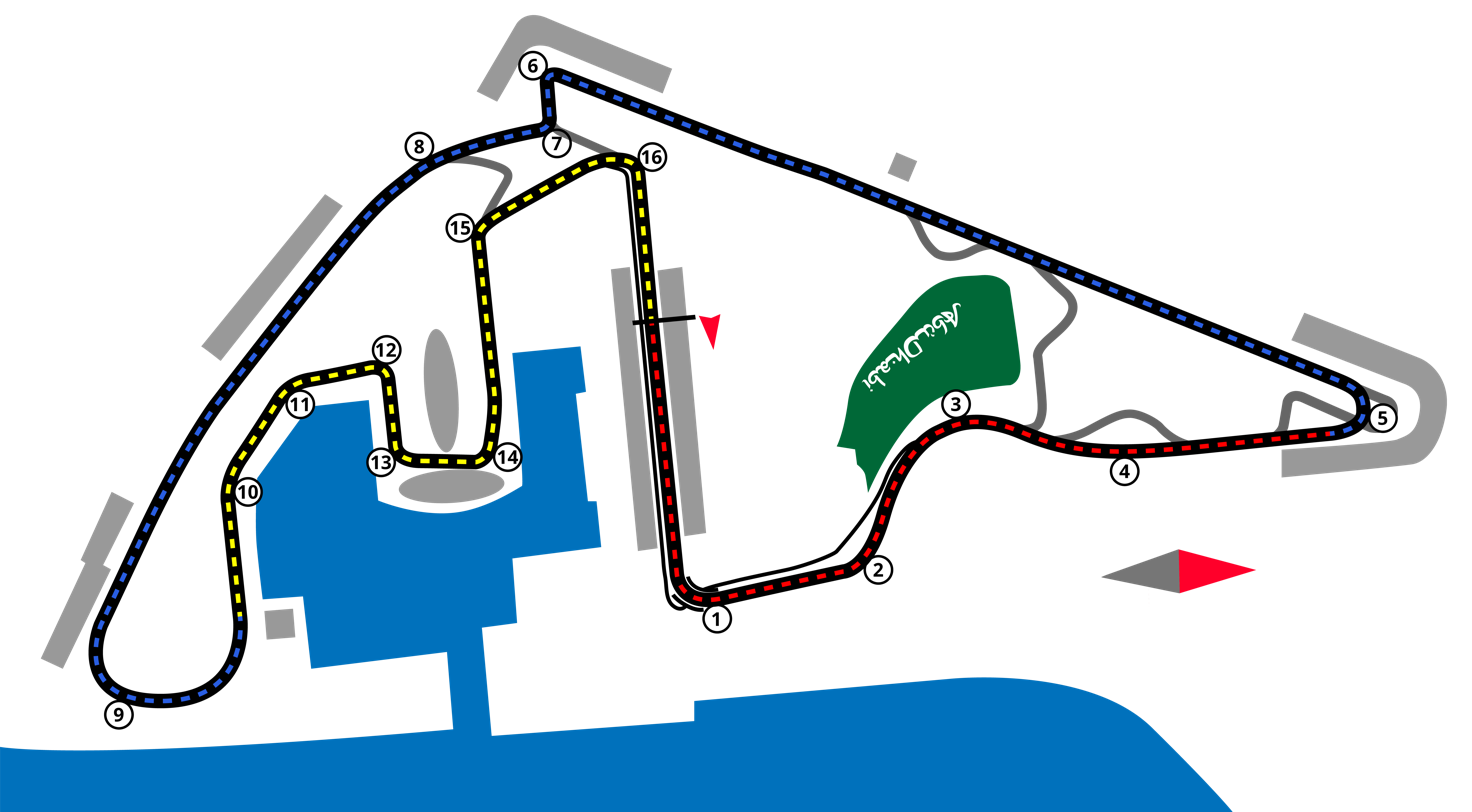
The layout of the Yas Marina Circuit, where the race was held.

The 2024 6 Hours of Abu Dhabi (formally known as the Hankook 6 Hours Abu Dhabi), was the 4th running of the 6 Hours of Abu Dhabi, an endurance race that took place at the Yas Marina Circuit on 21 January 2024. The race was the second round of the 2023–24 Middle East Trophy after the 2024 Dubai 24 Hour was delayed due to shipping issues in the Bab-el-Mandeb Strait.

== Schedule ==
| Date | Time (local: GST) | Event | Duration |
|---|---|---|---|
| Saturday, 20 January | 9:00 - 10:00 | Free Practice | 90 Minutes |
| Saturday, 20 January | 17:10 - 17:50 | Qualifying | 3x15 Minutes |
| Sunday, 21 January | 10:00 - 16:00 | Race | 6 Hours |

== Entry list ==
The entry list consisted of 43 cars; 15 were entered in GT3, 7 in GTX, 11 in 992, 5 in GT4, and 5 in TCE.

| Team | Car | Engine | No. | Drivers | Class |
GT3 (15 entries)
| (Australia) EBM – Grove Racing | Mercedes-AMG GT3 Evo | Mercedes-AMG M159 6.2 L V8 | 10 | (Australia) Brenton Grove (Australia) Stephen Grove (Australia) Jordan Love | P |
| (United Kingdom) Race Lab | McLaren 720S GT3 Evo | McLaren M840T 4.0 L Turbo V8 | 13 | (United Kingdom) Euan Hankey (United Kingdom) James Kell (United Kingdom) Lucky Khera (United States) Thomas Surgent | PA |
| (Antigua and Barbuda) HAAS RT | Audi R8 LMS Evo II | Audi DAR 5.2 L V10 | 21 | (Belgium) Mathieu Detry (Germany) Thomas Kiefer (Germany) Torsten Kratz (Kyrgyzstan) Stanislav Minsky | Am |
| (Antigua and Barbuda) HAAS RT | Mercedes-AMG GT3 Evo | Mercedes-AMG M159 6.2 L V8 | 92 | (Italy) Edoardo Bacci (Lebanon) Masoud Jaberian (Italy) Alessandro Tonoli | PA |
| (United Kingdom) Century Motorsport | BMW M4 GT3 | BMW S58B30T0 3.0 L Turbo V8 | 22 | (United Kingdom) Jack Barlow (United Kingdom) Carl Cavers (United Kingdom) Lewis Plato | PA |
| (Slovakia) ARC Bratislava | Lamborghini Huracán GT3 Evo | Lamborghini DGF 5.2 L V10 | 44 | (Czech Republic) Petr Fulín (Slovakia) Miro Konôpka (Slovakia) Zdeno Mikulasko | Am |
| (United Arab Emirates) S'Aalocin by Kox Racing | Porsche 911 GT3 R (991.2) | Porsche 4.0 L Flat-6 | 48 | (Netherlands) Peter Kox (Netherlands) Stéphane Kox (Netherlands) Nico Pronk | PA |
| (Germany) Huber Motorsport | Porsche 911 GT3 R (992) | Porsche M97/80 4.2 L Flat-6 | 50 | (Germany) Marc Bartels (Germany) Finn Gehrsitz (Germany) Tim Zimmerman | P |
| (Armenia) Goroyan RT by Car Collection Motorsport | Audi R8 LMS Evo II | Audi DAR 5.2 L V10 | 80 | (Armenia) Artur Goroyan (Armenia) Roman Mavlanov (Germany) Markus Winkelhock | P |
| (United States) CP Racing | Mercedes-AMG GT3 Evo | Mercedes-AMG M159 6.2 L V8 | 85 | (United States) Charles Espenlaub (United States) Joe Foster (United States) Charles Putman (United States) Shane Lewis | Am |
| (United Arab Emirates) Baron Motorsport | Ferrari 488 GT3 Evo 2020 | Ferrari F154CB 3.9 L Turbo V8 | 86 | (Austria) Philipp Baron (Zimbabwe) Axcil Jefferies (Austria) Ernst Kirchmayr | Am |
| (Germany) Herberth Motorsport | Porsche 911 GT3 R (992) | Porsche M97/80 4.2 L Flat-6 | 91 | (Hong Kong) Antares Au (Germany) Ralf Bohn (Germany) Alfred Renauer | PA |
| (United Arab Emirates) Manamauri Energy by Ebimotors | Porsche 911 GT3 R (992) | Porsche M97/80 4.2 L Flat-6 | 95 | (Italy) Fabrizio Broggi (Italy) Sabino de Castro (Romania) Sergiu Nicolae (Italy) Cosimo Papi | PA |
| (Germany) Car Collection Motorsport | Porsche 911 GT3 R (992) | Porsche M97/80 4.2 L Flat-6 | 96 | (United States) Dustin Blattner (Netherlands) Loek Hartog (Germany) Dennis Marschall | PA |
| (Germany) Attempto Racing | Audi R8 LMS Evo II | Audi DAR 5.2 L V10 | 99 | (Germany) Alex Aka (Belgium) Jef Machiels (Germany) Florian Scholze | P |
GTX (7 entries)
| (France) Vortex V8 | Vortex 2.0 | Chevrolet LS3 6.2 L V8 | 701 | (France) Lionel Amrouche (France) Philippe Bonnel (France) Arnaud Gomez (France) Olivier Gomez | |
| (Germany) Leipert Motorsport | Lamborghini Huracán Super Trofeo Evo 2 | Lamborghini 5.2 L V10 | 710 | (United States) Gregg Gorski (Australia) Brendon Leitch (United States) Gerhard Watzinger | |
| (Austria) Razoon – More Than Racing | KTM X-Bow GT2 Concept | Audi 2.5 L I5 | 714 | (Poland) Arthur Chwist (Austria) Daniel Drexel (Austria) Denis Liebl | |
| (Portugal) P21 Motorsport | Porsche 991 GT3 Cup II | Porsche 4.0 L Flat-6 | 715 | (Portugal) Rúben Costa (Portugal) José Monroy (Portugal) Rui Miritta (Brazil) "BigGeorge" | |
| (Portugal) P21 Motorsport | Porsche 991 GT3 Cup I | Porsche 3.8 L Flat-6 | 721 | (Portugal) Rúben Costa (Portugal) Alexandre Fonseca (Portugal) José Monroy (Portugal) Kika Queiroz | |
| (United Kingdom) Scott Sport | Lamborghini Huracán Super Trofeo Evo | Lamborghini 5.2 L V10 | 750 | (Canada) Keith Frieser (Denmark) Mikkel Mac | |
| (United Kingdom) Toro Verde GT | Ginetta G56 Cup | GM LS3 6.2 L V8 | 795 | (United Kingdom) Mike Simpson (United Kingdom) Freddie Tomlinson (United Kingdom) Lawrence Tomlinson | |
992 (11 entries)
| (France) SebLajoux Racing by DUWO Racing | Porsche 992 GT3 Cup | Porsche 4.0 L Flat-6 | 908 | (France) Sebastien Lajoux (Belgium) Benjamin Paque (France) Stéphane Perrin | Am |
| (Netherlands) Red Camel-Jordans.nl | Porsche 992 GT3 Cup | Porsche 4.0 L Flat-6 | 909 | (Netherlands) Ivo Breukers (Netherlands) Luc Breukers (Switzerland) Fabian Danz | P |
| (United Arab Emirates) PRP Motorsports with HRT | Porsche 992 GT3 Cup | Porsche 4.0 L Flat-6 | 918 | (United Kingdom) Steven Liquorish (United Kingdom) Graeme Mundy (France) Gilles Vannelet | Am |
| (Belgium) Mühlner Motorsport | Porsche 992 GT3 Cup | Porsche 4.0 L Flat-6 | 921 | (Germany) Peter Terting (Grenada) Vladislav Lomko (United States) Bryan Sircely | P |
| QMMF by HRT Suhail Qatar | Porsche 992 GT3 Cup | Porsche 4.0 L Flat-6 | 931 | (Qatar) Ibrahim Al-Abdulghani (Qatar) Abdulla Ali Al-Khelaifi (Qatar) Ghanim Ali Al Maadheed (Germany) Julian Hanses | Am |
| (Germany) KKrämer Racing | Porsche 992 GT3 Cup | Porsche 4.0 L Flat-6 | 936 | (Kyrgyzstan) "Selv" (Germany) Michele di Martino (Germany) Karsten Krämer (Germany) Fidel Leib (Germany) Alexej Veremenko | Am |
| (Germany) KKrämer Racing | Porsche 992 GT3 Cup | Porsche 4.0 L Flat-6 | 937 | (Germany) Karsten Krämer (Australia) Cameron McLeod (Italy) Mark "Speakerwas" (Germany) Etienne Ploenes | P |
| (Netherlands) MDM Ireckonu | Porsche 992 GT3 Cup | Porsche 4.0 L Flat-6 | 965 | (Netherlands) Tom Coronel (Netherlands) Jan Jaap van Roon | P |
| (United Arab Emirates) RABDAN by Fulgenzi Racing | Porsche 992 GT3 Cup | Porsche 4.0 L Flat-6 | 971 | (United Arab Emirates) Saif Alameri (United Arab Emirates) Salem Alketbi (Austria) Christopher Zöchling | Am |
| (Austria) Neuhofer Rennsport by MRS GT-Racing | Porsche 992 GT3 Cup | Porsche 4.0 L Flat-6 | 988 | (Austria) Felix Neuhofer (Austria) Markus Neuhofer; Alexey Denisov | Am |
| (Netherlands) NKPP Racing by Bas Koeten | Porsche 992 GT3 Cup | Porsche 4.0 L Flat-6 | 992 | (Netherlands) Gjis Bessem (Netherlands) Harry Hilders | Am |
GT4 (5 entries)
| (United Arab Emirates) GPM Racing by Dragon | Mercedes-AMG GT4 | Mercedes-AMG M178 4.0 L V8 | 408 | (Canada) Ramez Azzam (Germany) Denis Bulatov (United States) Keith Gatehouse | |
| (United Kingdom) Toyota Gazoo Racing UK | Toyota GR Supra GT4 Evo | BMW B58B30 3.0 L Twin-Turbo I6 | 423 | (United Kingdom) Samuel Harrison (United Kingdom) Kavi Jundu (United Kingdom) Michael O'Brien (United Kingdom) Benjamin Tusting | |
| (United Kingdom) Century Motorsport | BMW M4 GT4 Gen II | BMW N55 3.0 L Twin-Turbo I6 | 429 | (United Kingdom) Ravi Ramyead (United Kingdom) Charlie Robertson | |
| (United Kingdom) AGMC Racing Team by Simpson Motorsport | BMW M4 GT4 Gen II | BMW N55 3.0 L Twin-Turbo I6 | 438 | (United Kingdom) Tim Docker (Belgium) Fabian Duffieux (Kyrgyzstan) Ivan Krapivtsev | |
| (United Arab Emirates) Continental Racing | Toyota GR Supra GT4 Evo | BMW B58B30 3.0 L Twin-Turbo I6 | 496 | (United Arab Emirates) Ahmed Al Khaja (Kyrgyzstan) Andrey Solukovtsev (Cyprus) Vasily Vladykin | |
TCR (2 entries)
| (United Kingdom) Simpson Motorsport | Audi RS 3 LMS TCR (2017) | Volkswagen EA888 2.0 L I4 | 138 | (United Kingdom) Jason Garrett (United Kingdom) Ricky Coomber; Andrei Muraveika (Kyrgyzstan) Ivan Stanchin | |
| (Belgium) AC Motorsport | Audi RS 3 LMS TCR (2021) | Volkswagen EA888 2.0 L I4 | 188 | (Latvia) Ivars Vallers (United Kingdom) James Kaye | |
TCX (3 entries)
| (Luxembourg) Race Track Competition | Lamera GT | Volvo 2.5 L I5 | 223 | (Luxembourg) Gilles Bruckner (France) Daniel Lamouli (Luxembourg) Tommy Rollinger | |
| (United Kingdom) CWS Engineering | Ginetta G55 Supercup | Ford Cyclone 3.7 L V6 | 277 | (United Kingdom) Dale Albutt (United Kingdom) Owen Hizzey (United Kingdom) Colin White | |
| (United Kingdom) CWS Engineering | Ginetta G55 Supercup | Ford Cyclone 3.7 L V6 | 278 | (Australia) Mark Griffith (United Kingdom) Colin White | |

GT3 entries
| Icon | Class |
|---|---|
| P | GT3-Pro |
| PA | GT3-Pro Am |
| Am | GT3-Am |
992 entries
| Icon | Class |
| P | 992-Pro |
| Am | 992-Am |

== Results ==
=== Qualifying ===
Pole positions in each class are denoted in bold.

| Pos. | Class | No. | Team | Q1 | Q2 | Q3 | Avg |
|---|---|---|---|---|---|---|---|
| 1 | **GT3 Am** | **21** | **(Antigua and Barbuda) HAAS RT** | 1:54.309 | 1:54.065 | 1:54.008 | **1:54.127** |
| 2 | **GT3 Pro/Am** | **96** | **(Germany) Car Collection Motorsport** | 1:55.124 | 1:53.742 | 1:53.734 | **1:54.200** |
| 3 | GT3 Am | 86 | (United Arab Emirates) Baron Motorsport | 1:53.844 | 1:56.380 | 1:53.467 | 1:54.563 |
| 4 | GT3 Am | 91 | (Germany) Herberth Motorsport | 1:55.050 | 1:55.024 | 1:53.960 | 1:54.678 |
| 5 | GT3 Pro/Am | 10 | (Australia) EBM – Grove Racing | 1:57.141 | 1:53.925 | 1:53.233 | 1:54.766 |
| 6 | GT3 Pro/Am | 22 | (United Kingdom) Century Motorsport | 1:54.736 | 1:54.934 | 1:55.444 | 1:55.038 |
| 7 | GT3 Pro/Am | 13 | (United Kingdom) Race Lab | 1:56.687 | 1:53.951 | 1:54.556 | 1:55.064 |
| 8 | **GT3 Pro** | **50** | **(Germany) Huber Motorsport** | 1:55.087 | 1:54.625 | 1:56.085 | **1:55.265** |
| 9 | GT3 Pro | 99 | (Germany) Attempto Racing | 1:55.829 | 1:55.889 | 1:54.781 | 1:55.499 |
| 10 | GT3 Pro/Am | 95 | (United Arab Emirates) Manamauri Energy by Ebimotors | 1:56.392 | 1:54.761 | 1:55.383 | 1:55.512 |
| 11 | GT3 Am | 85 | (United States) CP Racing | 1:56.851 | 1:56.230 | 1:55.451 | 1:56.177 |
| 12 | GT3 Pro | 80 | (Armenia) Goroyan RT by Car Collection Motorsport | 1:59.289 | 1:55.568 | 1:54.547 | 1:56.468 |
| 13 | GT3 Am | 44 | (Slovakia) ARC Bratislava | 1:57.920 | 1:56.832 | 1:55.065 | 1:56.605 |
| 14 | **GTX** | **701** | **(France) Vortex V8** | 1:55.912 | 1:58.199 | 1:56.801 | **1:56.970** |
| 15 | GT3 Am | 48 | (United Arab Emirates) S'Aalocin by Kox Racing | 1:59.500 | 1:56.964 | 1:55.141 | 1:57.201 |
| 16 | GT3 Pro/Am | 92 | (Antigua and Barbuda) HAAS RT | 1:57.725 | 1:55.502 | 1:59.458 | 1:57.561 |
| 17 | GTX | 750 | (United Kingdom) Scott Sport | 2:01.297 | 1:56.153 | 1:55.824 | 1:57.758 |
| 18 | GTX | 710 | (Germany) Leipert Motorsport | 1:58.965 | 2:00.273 | 1:55.840 | 1:58.359 |
| 19 | GTX | 714 | (Austria) Razoon – More Than Racing | 1:59.680 | 1:57.927 | 1:58.164 | 1:58.590 |
| 20 | **992 Pro** | **909** | **(Netherlands) Red Camel-Jordans.nl** | 1:59.297 | 1:59.034 | 1:58.160 | **1:58.830** |
| 21 | GTX | 795 | (United Kingdom) Toro Verde GT | 2:00.427 | 1:58.067 | 1:58.561 | 1:59.018 |
| 22 | **992 Am** | **971** | **(United Arab Emirates) RABDAN by Fulgenzi Racing** | 2:00.177 | 1:59.994 | 1:57.726 | **1:59.299** |
| 23 | 992 Am | 931 | QMMF by HRT Suhail Qatar | 1:59.827 | 2:00.230 | 1:58.872 | 1:59.643 |
| 24 | 992 Pro | 965 | (Netherlands) MDM Ireckonu | 2:01.157 | 1:58.789 | 1:59.312 | 1:59.752 |
| 25 | 992 Am | 936 | (Germany) KKrämer Racing | 1:59.606 | 1:58.575 | 2:01.259 | 1:59.813 |
| 26 | 992 Am | 908 | (France) SebLajoux Racing by DUWO Racing | 1:59.602 | 2:02.401 | 1:59.301 | 2:00.434 |
| 27 | 992 Pro | 937 | (Germany) KKrämer Racing | 2:02.710 | 1:58.245 | 2:02.567 | 2:01.174 |
| 28 | 992 Am | 918 | (United Arab Emirates) PRP Motorsports with HRT | 2:01.443 | 2:01.966 | 2:00.926 | 2:01.445 |
| 29 | 992 Pro | 921 | (Belgium) Mühlner Motorsport | 2:04.298 | 1:59.731 | 2:00.363 | 2:01.464 |
| 30 | 992 Am | 988 | (Austria) Neuhofer Rennsport by MRS GT-Racing | 2:02.887 | 2:03.779 | 1:59.167 | 2:01.944 |
| 31 | 992 Am | 992 | (Netherlands) NKPP Racing by Bas Koeten | 2:01.107 | 2:02.094 | 2:03.367 | 2:02.189 |
| 32 | **GT4** | **429** | **(United Kingdom) Century Motorsport** | 2:04.129 | 2:03.081 | 2:04.100 | **2:03.770** |
| 33 | GT4 | 408 | (United Arab Emirates) GPM Racing by Dragon | 2:06.294 | 2:03.940 | 2:04.280 | 2:04.838 |
| 34 | GT4 | 423 | (United Kingdom) Toyota Gazoo Racing UK | 2:05.086 | 2:05.575 | 2:04.563 | 2:05.074 |
| 35 | GT4 | 496 | (United Arab Emirates) Continental Racing | 2:04.452 | 2:04.127 | 2:07.133 | 2:05.237 |
| 36 | GT4 | 438 | (United Kingdom) AGMC Racing Team by Simpson Motorsport | 2:09.098 | 2:05.523 | 2:05.273 | 2:06.631 |
| 37 | GTX | 715 | (Portugal) P21 Motorsport | 2:13.862 | 2:05.428 | 2:03.036 | 2:07.442 |
| 38 | **TCX** | **278** | **(United Kingdom) CWS Engineering** | 2:06.370 | 2:09.008 | 2:07.741 | **2:07.706** |
| 39 | TCX | 277 | (United Kingdom) CWS Engineering | 2:09.931 | 2:08.349 | 2:06.211 | 2:08.163 |
| 40 | **TCR** | **188** | **(Belgium) AC Motorsport** | 2:08.237 | 2:08.995 | 2:08.871 | **2:08.701** |
| 41 | TCR | 138 | (United Kingdom) Simpson Motorsport | 2:10.807 | 2:11.866 | 2:10.172 | 2:10.948 |
| 42 | TCX | 223 | (Luxembourg) Race Track Competition | 2:07.583 | 2:15.926 | 2:10.415 | 2:11.308 |
| 43 | GTX | 721 | (Portugal) P21 Motorsport | 2:28.800 | 2:03.084 | 2:08.905 | 2:13.596 |

=== Race ===
Class winners are denoted in bold.

| Pos | Class | No. | Team | Drivers | Chassis | Time/Reason | Laps |
| Pos | Class | No. | Team | Drivers | Engine | Time/Reason | Laps |
|---|---|---|---|---|---|---|---|
| 1 | **GT3 Pro/Am** | **96** | **(Germany) Car Collection Motorsport** | **(United States) Dustin Blattner** **(Netherlands) Loek Hartog** **(Germany) Dennis Marschall** | **Porsche 911 GT3 R (992)** | **6:00:29.851** | **140** |
| 1 | **GT3 Pro/Am** | **96** | **(Germany) Car Collection Motorsport** | **(United States) Dustin Blattner** **(Netherlands) Loek Hartog** **(Germany) Dennis Marschall** | **Porsche M97/80 4.2 L Flat-6** | **6:00:29.851** | **140** |
| 2 | **GT3 Am** | **86** | **(United Arab Emirates) Baron Motorsport** | **(Austria) Philipp Baron** **(Zimbabwe) Axcil Jefferies** **(Austria) Ernst Kirchmayr** | **Ferrari 488 GT3 Evo 2020** | **+57.439** | **140** |
| 2 | **GT3 Am** | **86** | **(United Arab Emirates) Baron Motorsport** | **(Austria) Philipp Baron** **(Zimbabwe) Axcil Jefferies** **(Austria) Ernst Kirchmayr** | **Ferrari F154CB 3.9 L Turbo V8** | **+57.439** | **140** |
| 3 | GT3 Pro/Am | 95 | (United Arab Emirates) Manamauri Energy by Ebimotors | (Italy) Fabrizio Broggi (Italy) Sabino de Castro (Romania) Sergiu Nicolae (Italy) Cosimo Papi | Porsche 911 GT3 R (992) | +1:18.595 | 140 |
| 3 | GT3 Pro/Am | 95 | (United Arab Emirates) Manamauri Energy by Ebimotors | (Italy) Fabrizio Broggi (Italy) Sabino de Castro (Romania) Sergiu Nicolae (Italy) Cosimo Papi | Porsche M97/80 4.2 L Flat-6 | +1:18.595 | 140 |
| 4 | **GT3 Pro** | **99** | **(Germany) Attempto Racing** | **(Germany) Alex Aka** **(Belgium) Jef Machiels** **(Germany) Florian Scholze** | **Audi R8 LMS Evo II** | **+1:20.052** | **140** |
| 4 | **GT3 Pro** | **99** | **(Germany) Attempto Racing** | **(Germany) Alex Aka** **(Belgium) Jef Machiels** **(Germany) Florian Scholze** | **Audi DAR 5.2 L V10** | **+1:20.052** | **140** |
| 5 | GT3 Am | 91 | (Germany) Herberth Motorsport | (Hong Kong) Antares Au (Germany) Ralf Bohn (Germany) Alfred Renauer | Porsche 911 GT3 R (992) | +1:36.125 | 140 |
| 5 | GT3 Am | 91 | (Germany) Herberth Motorsport | (Hong Kong) Antares Au (Germany) Ralf Bohn (Germany) Alfred Renauer | Porsche M97/80 4.2 L Flat-6 | +1:36.125 | 140 |
| 6 | GT3 Am | 85 | (United States) CP Racing | (United States) Charles Espenlaub (United States) Joe Foster (United States) Charles Putman (United States) Shane Lewis | Mercedes-AMG GT3 Evo | +1:46.068 | 140 |
| 6 | GT3 Am | 85 | (United States) CP Racing | (United States) Charles Espenlaub (United States) Joe Foster (United States) Charles Putman (United States) Shane Lewis | Mercedes-AMG M159 6.2 L V8 | +1:46.068 | 140 |
| 7 | GT3 Pro | 80 | (Armenia) Goroyan RT by Car Collection Motorsport | (Armenia) Artur Goroyan (Armenia) Roman Mavlanov (Germany) Markus Winkelhock | Audi R8 LMS Evo II | +1 Lap | 139 |
| 7 | GT3 Pro | 80 | (Armenia) Goroyan RT by Car Collection Motorsport | (Armenia) Artur Goroyan (Armenia) Roman Mavlanov (Germany) Markus Winkelhock | Audi DAR 5.2 L V10 | +1 Lap | 139 |
| 8 | GT3 Am | 21 | (Antigua and Barbuda) HAAS RT | (Belgium) Mathieu Detry (Germany) Thomas Kiefer (Germany) Torsten Kratz (Kyrgyzstan) Stanislav Minsky | Audi R8 LMS Evo II | +1 Lap | 139 |
| 8 | GT3 Am | 21 | (Antigua and Barbuda) HAAS RT | (Belgium) Mathieu Detry (Germany) Thomas Kiefer (Germany) Torsten Kratz (Kyrgyzstan) Stanislav Minsky | Audi DAR 5.2 L V10 | +1 Lap | 139 |
| 9 | GT3 Pro | 50 | (Germany) Huber Motorsport | (Germany) Marc Bartels (Germany) Finn Gehrsitz (Germany) Tim Zimmerman | Porsche 911 GT3 R (992) | +1 Lap | 139 |
| 9 | GT3 Pro | 50 | (Germany) Huber Motorsport | (Germany) Marc Bartels (Germany) Finn Gehrsitz (Germany) Tim Zimmerman | Porsche M97/80 4.2 L Flat-6 | +1 Lap | 139 |
| 10 | **992 Pro** | **909** | **(Netherlands) Red Camel-Jordans.nl** | **(Netherlands) Ivo Breukers** **(Netherlands) Luc Breukers** **(Switzerland) Fabian Danz** | **Porsche 992 GT3 Cup** | **+3 Laps** | **137** |
| 10 | **992 Pro** | **909** | **(Netherlands) Red Camel-Jordans.nl** | **(Netherlands) Ivo Breukers** **(Netherlands) Luc Breukers** **(Switzerland) Fabian Danz** | **Porsche 4.0 L Flat-6** | **+3 Laps** | **137** |
| 11 | GT3 Pro/Am | 13 | (United Kingdom) Race Lab | (United Kingdom) Euan Hankey (United Kingdom) James Kell (United Kingdom) Lucky Khera (United States) Thomas Surgent | McLaren 720S GT3 Evo | +3 Laps | 137 |
| 11 | GT3 Pro/Am | 13 | (United Kingdom) Race Lab | (United Kingdom) Euan Hankey (United Kingdom) James Kell (United Kingdom) Lucky Khera (United States) Thomas Surgent | McLaren M840T 4.0 L Turbo V8 | +3 Laps | 137 |
| 12 | **992 Am** | **931** | **QMMF by HRT Suhail Qatar** | **(Qatar) Ibrahim Al-Abdulghani** **(Qatar) Abdulla Ali Al-Khelaifi** **(Qatar) Ghanim Ali Al Maadheed** **(Germany) Julian Hanses** | **Porsche 992 GT3 Cup** | **+4 Laps** | **136** |
| 12 | **992 Am** | **931** | **QMMF by HRT Suhail Qatar** | **(Qatar) Ibrahim Al-Abdulghani** **(Qatar) Abdulla Ali Al-Khelaifi** **(Qatar) Ghanim Ali Al Maadheed** **(Germany) Julian Hanses** | **Porsche 4.0 L Flat-6** | **+4 Laps** | **136** |
| 13 | 992 Am | 971 | (United Arab Emirates) RABDAN by Fulgenzi Racing | (United Arab Emirates) Saif Alameri (United Arab Emirates) Salem Alketbi (Austria) Christopher Zöchling | Porsche 992 GT3 Cup | +4 Laps | 136 |
| 13 | 992 Am | 971 | (United Arab Emirates) RABDAN by Fulgenzi Racing | (United Arab Emirates) Saif Alameri (United Arab Emirates) Salem Alketbi (Austria) Christopher Zöchling | Porsche 4.0 L Flat-6 | +4 Laps | 136 |
| 14 | 992 Am | 936 | (Germany) KKrämer Racing | (Kyrgyzstan) "Selv" (Germany) Michele di Martino (Germany) Fidel Leib (Germany) Alexej Veremenko | Porsche 992 GT3 Cup | +4 Laps | 136 |
| 14 | 992 Am | 936 | (Germany) KKrämer Racing | (Kyrgyzstan) "Selv" (Germany) Michele di Martino (Germany) Fidel Leib (Germany) Alexej Veremenko | Porsche 4.0 L Flat-6 | +4 Laps | 136 |
| 15 | 992 Am | 992 | (Netherlands) NKPP Racing by Bas Koeten | (Netherlands) Gjis Bessem (Netherlands) Harry Hilders | Porsche 992 GT3 Cup | +5 Laps | 135 |
| 15 | 992 Am | 992 | (Netherlands) NKPP Racing by Bas Koeten | (Netherlands) Gjis Bessem (Netherlands) Harry Hilders | Porsche 4.0 L Flat-6 | +5 Laps | 135 |
| 16 | 992 Pro | 965 | (Netherlands) MDM Ireckonu | (Netherlands) Tom Coronel (Netherlands) Jan Jaap van Roon | Porsche 992 GT3 Cup | +5 Laps | 135 |
| 16 | 992 Pro | 965 | (Netherlands) MDM Ireckonu | (Netherlands) Tom Coronel (Netherlands) Jan Jaap van Roon | Porsche 4.0 L Flat-6 | +5 Laps | 135 |
| 17 | GT3 Am | 44 | (Slovakia) ARC Bratislava | (Czech Republic) Petr Fulín (Slovakia) Miro Konôpka (Slovakia) Zdeno Mikulasko | Lamborghini Huracán GT3 Evo | +6 Laps | 134 |
| 17 | GT3 Am | 44 | (Slovakia) ARC Bratislava | (Czech Republic) Petr Fulín (Slovakia) Miro Konôpka (Slovakia) Zdeno Mikulasko | Lamborghini DGF 5.2 L V10 | +6 Laps | 134 |
| 18 | GT3 Am | 48 | (United Arab Emirates) S'Aalocin by Kox Racing | (Netherlands) Peter Kox (Netherlands) Stéphane Kox (Netherlands) Nico Pronk | Porsche 911 GT3 R (991.2) | +6 Laps | 134 |
| 18 | GT3 Am | 48 | (United Arab Emirates) S'Aalocin by Kox Racing | (Netherlands) Peter Kox (Netherlands) Stéphane Kox (Netherlands) Nico Pronk | Porsche 4.0 L Flat-6 | +6 Laps | 134 |
| 19 | **GTX** | **701** | **(France) Vortex V8** | **(France) Lionel Amrouche** **(France) Philippe Bonnel** **(France) Arnaud Gomez** **(France) Olivier Gomez** | **Vortex 2.0** | **+6 Laps** | **134** |
| 19 | **GTX** | **701** | **(France) Vortex V8** | **(France) Lionel Amrouche** **(France) Philippe Bonnel** **(France) Arnaud Gomez** **(France) Olivier Gomez** | **Chevrolet LS3 6.2 L V8** | **+6 Laps** | **134** |
| 20 | GTX | 750 | (United Kingdom) Scott Sport | (Canada) Keith Frieser (Denmark) Mikkel Mac | Lamborghini Huracán Super Trofeo Evo | +6 Laps | 134 |
| 20 | GTX | 750 | (United Kingdom) Scott Sport | (Canada) Keith Frieser (Denmark) Mikkel Mac | Lamborghini 5.2 L V10 | +6 Laps | 134 |
| 21 | 992 Am | 988 | (Austria) Neuhofer Rennsport by MRS GT-Racing | (Austria) Felix Neuhofer (Austria) Markus Neuhofer; Alexey Denisov | Porsche 992 GT3 Cup | +7 Laps | 133 |
| 21 | 992 Am | 988 | (Austria) Neuhofer Rennsport by MRS GT-Racing | (Austria) Felix Neuhofer (Austria) Markus Neuhofer; Alexey Denisov | Porsche 4.0 L Flat-6 | +7 Laps | 133 |
| 22 | 992 Am | 937 | (Germany) KKrämer Racing | (Germany) Karsten Krämer (Australia) Cameron McLeod (Italy) Mark "Speakerwas" (Germany) Etienne Ploenes | Porsche 992 GT3 Cup | +7 Laps | 133 |
| 22 | 992 Am | 937 | (Germany) KKrämer Racing | (Germany) Karsten Krämer (Australia) Cameron McLeod (Italy) Mark "Speakerwas" (Germany) Etienne Ploenes | Porsche 4.0 L Flat-6 | +7 Laps | 133 |
| 23 | 992 Pro | 921 | (Belgium) Mühlner Motorsport | (Germany) Peter Terting (Grenada) Vladislav Lomko (United States) Bryan Sircely | Porsche 992 GT3 Cup | +8 Laps | 132 |
| 23 | 992 Pro | 921 | (Belgium) Mühlner Motorsport | (Germany) Peter Terting (Grenada) Vladislav Lomko (United States) Bryan Sircely | Porsche 4.0 L Flat-6 | +8 Laps | 132 |
| 24 | 992 Am | 908 | (France) SebLajoux Racing by DUWO Racing | (France) Sebastien Lajoux (Belgium) Benjamin Paque (France) Stéphane Perrin | Porsche 992 GT3 Cup | +8 Laps | 132 |
| 24 | 992 Am | 908 | (France) SebLajoux Racing by DUWO Racing | (France) Sebastien Lajoux (Belgium) Benjamin Paque (France) Stéphane Perrin | Porsche 4.0 L Flat-6 | +8 Laps | 132 |
| 25 | **GT4** | **429** | **(United Kingdom) Century Motorsport** | **(United Kingdom) Ravi Ramyead** **(United Kingdom) Charlie Robertson** | **BMW M4 GT4 Gen II** | **+10 Laps** | **130** |
| 25 | **GT4** | **429** | **(United Kingdom) Century Motorsport** | **(United Kingdom) Ravi Ramyead** **(United Kingdom) Charlie Robertson** | **BMW N55 3.0 L Twin-Turbo I6** | **+10 Laps** | **130** |
| 26 | GT4 | 438 | (United Kingdom) AGMC Racing Team by Simpson Motorsport | (United Kingdom) Tim Docker (Belgium) Fabian Duffieux (Kyrgyzstan) Ivan Krapivtsev | BMW M4 GT4 Gen II | +10 Laps | 130 |
| 26 | GT4 | 438 | (United Kingdom) AGMC Racing Team by Simpson Motorsport | (United Kingdom) Tim Docker (Belgium) Fabian Duffieux (Kyrgyzstan) Ivan Krapivtsev | BMW N55 3.0 L Twin-Turbo I6 | +10 Laps | 130 |
| 27 | GT4 | 423 | (United Kingdom) Toyota Gazoo Racing UK | (United Kingdom) Samuel Harrison (United Kingdom) Kavi Jundu (United Kingdom) Michael O'Brien (United Kingdom) Benjamin Tusting | Toyota GR Supra GT4 Evo | +11 Laps | 129 |
| 27 | GT4 | 423 | (United Kingdom) Toyota Gazoo Racing UK | (United Kingdom) Samuel Harrison (United Kingdom) Kavi Jundu (United Kingdom) Michael O'Brien (United Kingdom) Benjamin Tusting | BMW B58B30 3.0 L Twin-Turbo I6 | +11 Laps | 129 |
| 28 | GT4 | 496 | (United Arab Emirates) Continental Racing | (United Arab Emirates) Ahmed Al Khaja (Kyrgyzstan) Andrey Solukovtsev (Cyprus) Vasily Vladykin | Toyota GR Supra GT4 Evo | +12 Laps | 128 |
| 28 | GT4 | 496 | (United Arab Emirates) Continental Racing | (United Arab Emirates) Ahmed Al Khaja (Kyrgyzstan) Andrey Solukovtsev (Cyprus) Vasily Vladykin | BMW B58B30 3.0 L Twin-Turbo I6 | +12 Laps | 128 |
| 29 | **TCR** | **188** | **(Belgium) AC Motorsport** | **(Latvia) Ivars Vallers** **(United Kingdom) James Kaye** | **Audi RS 3 LMS TCR (2021)** | **+12 Laps** | **128** |
| 29 | **TCR** | **188** | **(Belgium) AC Motorsport** | **(Latvia) Ivars Vallers** **(United Kingdom) James Kaye** | **Volkswagen EA888 2.0 L I4** | **+12 Laps** | **128** |
| 30 | **TCX** | **277** | **(United Kingdom) CWS Engineering** | **(United Kingdom) Dale Albutt** **(United Kingdom) Owen Hizzey** **(United Kingdom) Colin White** | **Ginetta G55 Supercup** | **+13 Laps** | **127** |
| 30 | **TCX** | **277** | **(United Kingdom) CWS Engineering** | **(United Kingdom) Dale Albutt** **(United Kingdom) Owen Hizzey** **(United Kingdom) Colin White** | **Ford Cyclone 3.7 L V6** | **+13 Laps** | **127** |
| 31 | GTX | 715 | (Portugal) P21 Motorsport | (Portugal) Rúben Costa (Portugal) José Monroy (Portugal) Rui Miritta (Brazil) "BigGeorge" | Porsche 991 GT3 Cup II | +14 Laps | 126 |
| 31 | GTX | 715 | (Portugal) P21 Motorsport | (Portugal) Rúben Costa (Portugal) José Monroy (Portugal) Rui Miritta (Brazil) "BigGeorge" | Porsche 4.0 L Flat-6 | +14 Laps | 126 |
| 32 | 992 Am | 918 | (United Arab Emirates) PRP Motorsports with HRT | (United Kingdom) Steven Liquorish (United Kingdom) Graeme Mundy (France) Gilles Vannelet | Porsche 992 GT3 Cup | +16 Laps | 124 |
| 32 | 992 Am | 918 | (United Arab Emirates) PRP Motorsports with HRT | (United Kingdom) Steven Liquorish (United Kingdom) Graeme Mundy (France) Gilles Vannelet | Porsche 4.0 L Flat-6 | +16 Laps | 124 |
| 33 | TCR | 138 | (United Kingdom) Simpson Motorsport | (United Kingdom) Jason Garrett (United Kingdom) Ricky Coomber; Andrei Muraveika (Kyrgyzstan) Ivan Stanchin | Audi RS 3 LMS TCR (2017) | +18 Laps | 122 |
| 33 | TCR | 138 | (United Kingdom) Simpson Motorsport | (United Kingdom) Jason Garrett (United Kingdom) Ricky Coomber; Andrei Muraveika (Kyrgyzstan) Ivan Stanchin | Volkswagen 2.0 L I4 | +18 Laps | 122 |
| 34 | GT3 Pro | 10 | (Australia) EBM – Grove Racing | (Australia) Brenton Grove (Australia) Stephen Grove (Australia) Jordan Love | Mercedes-AMG GT3 Evo | +22 Laps | 118 |
| 34 | GT3 Pro | 10 | (Australia) EBM – Grove Racing | (Australia) Brenton Grove (Australia) Stephen Grove (Australia) Jordan Love | Mercedes-AMG M159 6.2 L V8 | +22 Laps | 118 |
| 35 | GTX | 714 | (Austria) Razoon - More Than Racing | (Poland) Arthur Chwist (Austria) Daniel Drexel (Austria) Denis Liebl | KTM X-Bow GT2 Concept | +26 Laps | 114 |
| 35 | GTX | 714 | (Austria) Razoon - More Than Racing | (Poland) Arthur Chwist (Austria) Daniel Drexel (Austria) Denis Liebl | Audi 2.5 L I5 | +26 Laps | 114 |
| 36 | TCX | 278 | (United Kingdom) CWS Engineering | (Australia) Mark Griffith (United Kingdom) Colin White | Ginetta G55 Supercup | +28 Laps | 112 |
| 36 | TCX | 278 | (United Kingdom) CWS Engineering | (Australia) Mark Griffith (United Kingdom) Colin White | Ford Cyclone 3.7 L V6 | +28 Laps | 112 |
| 37 DNF | GT3 Pro/Am | 22 | (United Kingdom) Century Motorsport | (United Kingdom) Jack Barlow (United Kingdom) Carl Cavers (United Kingdom) Lewis Plato | BMW M4 GT3 | Clutch | 99 |
| 37 DNF | GT3 Pro/Am | 22 | (United Kingdom) Century Motorsport | (United Kingdom) Jack Barlow (United Kingdom) Carl Cavers (United Kingdom) Lewis Plato | BMW S58B30T0 3.0 L Turbo V8 | Clutch | 99 |
| 38 DNF | GTX | 710 | (Germany) Leipert Motorsport | (United States) Gregg Gorski (Australia) Brendon Leitch (United States) Gerhard Watzinger | Lamborghini Huracán Super Trofeo Evo 2 | Did not finish | 78 |
| 38 DNF | GTX | 710 | (Germany) Leipert Motorsport | (United States) Gregg Gorski (Australia) Brendon Leitch (United States) Gerhard Watzinger | Lamborghini 5.2 L V10 | Did not finish | 78 |
| 39 DNF | GTX | 721 | (Portugal) P21 Motorsport | (Portugal) Rúben Costa (Portugal) Alexandre Fonseca (Portugal) José Monroy (Portugal) Kika Queiroz | Porsche 991 GT3 Cup I | Did not finish | 73 |
| 39 DNF | GTX | 721 | (Portugal) P21 Motorsport | (Portugal) Rúben Costa (Portugal) Alexandre Fonseca (Portugal) José Monroy (Portugal) Kika Queiroz | Porsche 3.8 L Flat-6 | Did not finish | 73 |
| 40 DNF | TCX | 223 | (Luxembourg) Race Track Competition | (Luxembourg) Gilles Bruckner (France) Daniel Lamouli (Luxembourg) Tommy Rollinger | Lamera GT | Retired | 58 |
| 40 DNF | TCX | 223 | (Luxembourg) Race Track Competition | (Luxembourg) Gilles Bruckner (France) Daniel Lamouli (Luxembourg) Tommy Rollinger | Volvo 2.5 L I5 | Retired | 58 |
| 41 DNF | GT4 | 408 | (United Arab Emirates) GPM Racing by Dragon | (Canada) Ramez Azzam (Germany) Denis Bulatov (United States) Keith Gatehouse | Mercedes-AMG GT4 | Retired | 55 |
| 41 DNF | GT4 | 408 | (United Arab Emirates) GPM Racing by Dragon | (Canada) Ramez Azzam (Germany) Denis Bulatov (United States) Keith Gatehouse | Mercedes-AMG M178 4.0 L V8 | Retired | 55 |
| 42 DNF | GTX | 795 | (United Kingdom) Toro Verde GT | (United Kingdom) Mike Simpson (United Kingdom) Freddie Tomlinson (United Kingdom) Lawrence Tomlinson | Ginetta G56 Cup | Retired | 32 |
| 42 DNF | GTX | 795 | (United Kingdom) Toro Verde GT | (United Kingdom) Mike Simpson (United Kingdom) Freddie Tomlinson (United Kingdom) Lawrence Tomlinson | GM LS3 6.2 L V8 | Retired | 32 |
| 43 DNF | GT3 Pro/Am | 92 | (Antigua and Barbuda) HAAS RT | (Italy) Edoardo Bacci (Lebanon) Masoud Jaberian (Italy) Alessandro Tonoli | Mercedes-AMG GT3 Evo | Engine | 21 |
| 43 DNF | GT3 Pro/Am | 92 | (Antigua and Barbuda) HAAS RT | (Italy) Edoardo Bacci (Lebanon) Masoud Jaberian (Italy) Alessandro Tonoli | Mercedes-AMG M159 6.2 L V8 | Engine | 21 |

Middle East Trophy
| Previous race: 12 Hours of Kuwait | 2023–24 season | Next race: Dubai 24 Hour |
