= Certina =

Swiss watch manufacturer

Certina SA
- Type: Member of the Swatch group
- Industry: Watchmaking
- Founded: 1888 by Adolf & Alfred Kurth, in Grenchen, Switzerland
- Headquarters: Le Locle, Switzerland
- Products: Wristwatches, timing devices/systems
- Parent: The Swatch Group
- Website: www.certina.com

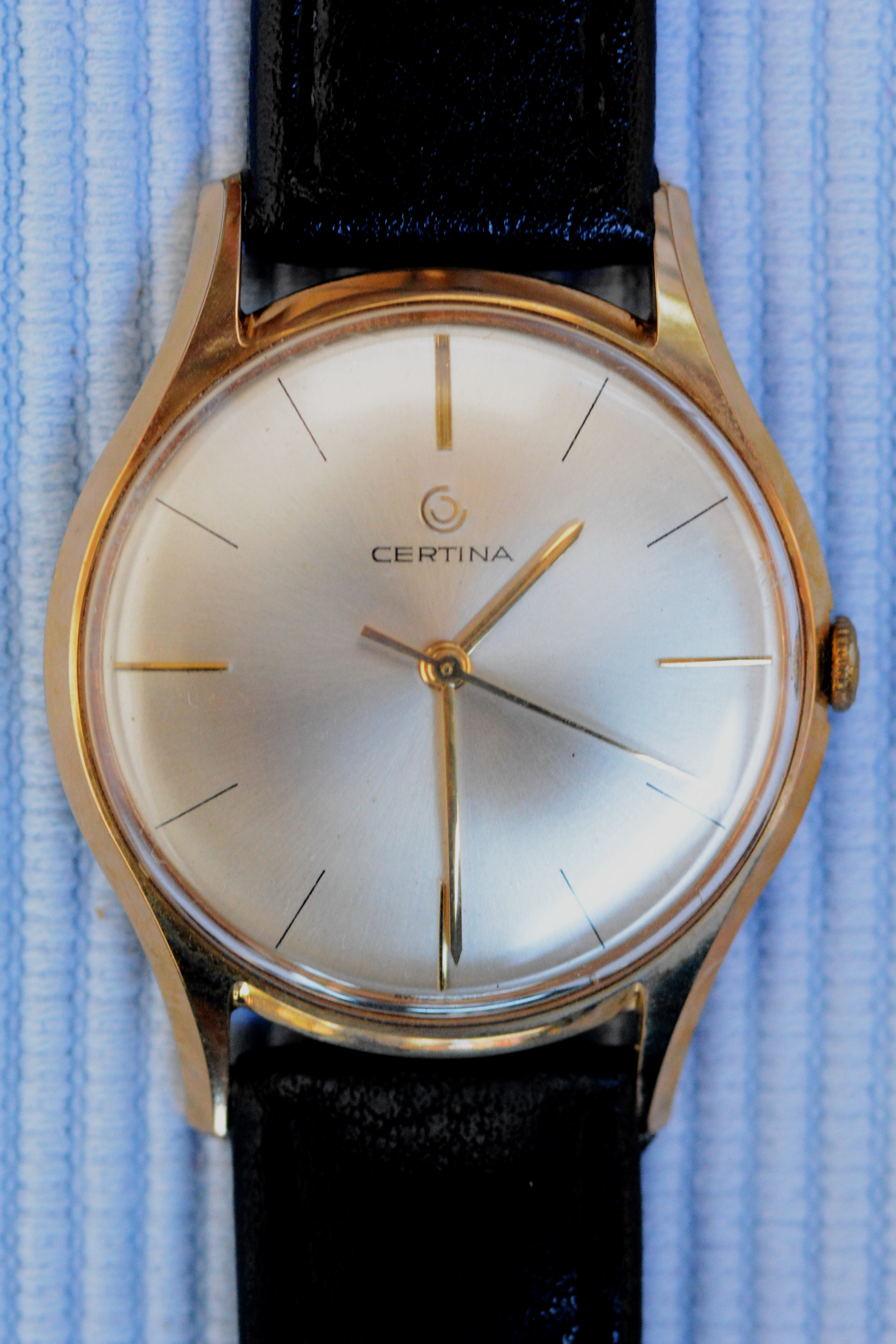
Certina Cal. 25-36, 1960

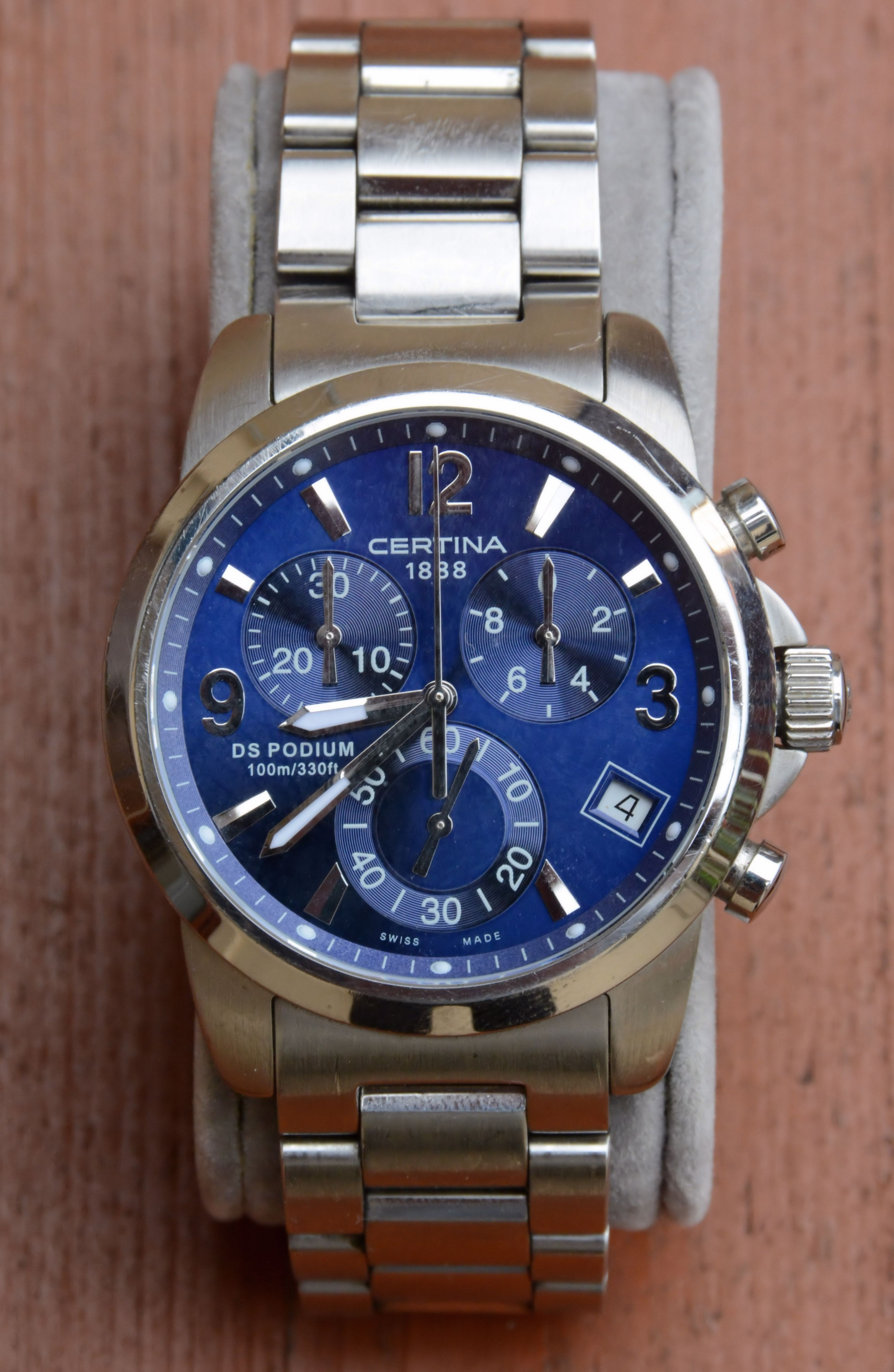
Certina 1888 DS Podium Chronograph

Certina S.A. is a Swiss watch brand, part of the Swatch Group, founded in Grenchen in 1888 by Adolf and Alfred Kurth. All Certina watches bear the "Swiss Made" seal of origin.

Certina watches are not related to German industrial conglomerate Certina Holding.

== History of Certina S.A. ==
Certina S.A. was founded in 1888 when Adolf and Alfred Kurth opened in Grenchen their first movement and supplies factory for the watchmaking industry. At the start Certina's staff consisted of three employees working in a workshop that was connected to the family home. They did not begin producing complete watches and timepieces for a few years which they then did alongside their work producing movements for other companies. By 1938 the company had expanded and 250 employees celebrated the 50th anniversary of the company.

Certina continued to expand and by 1955 the company had 500 employees working between the factory and offices, producing 1,000 timepieces every day. Certina worked up a new business plan that expanded its operations.

By 1972 the company employed 900 people and produced 600,000 watches per year.

1983 Certina became a member of the SMH Group (Swatch).

== Affiliation to ASUAG ==
In 1971, the owning family opted to join General Watch Co, the newly created sub-holding of ASUAG, in order to consolidate their efforts with others. The introduction of cheap and reliable automatics and quartz watches from Japan (under the ideas of their strategic management) stopped Certina's expansion. The restructuring involved the abandonment of their own manufacture of calibres, and by the end of the 1970s, operations were moved to Biel/Bienne and the entity Edox & Technos. Under the new management, the company managed to hold on to some of their properties, especially in the Scandinavian countries. Upon the merger of SSIH and ASUAG companies, Certina S.A. became a member of a new managerial entity, together with Mido and Tissot, which became known as Le Locle, (the newly elected Unesco World Heritage Site in Switzerland).

== Wristwatches, world’s first & lines of collection ==
- The first wristwatches : were already produced by the company in 1938 : predominately ladies watches, because men still preferred pocket watches.
- Digital Watch: 1936 became the first company to produce a digital watch. It was driven by a spring movement. Rotating disks bearing inscribed numbers were used to display the time, instead of hands.
- DS (Double Security) Line: In 1959 Hans and Edwin Kurth set themselves the objective of creating a new marketplace niche based on quality through engineering and technical design. Thus the company created the concept of suspending the watch movement inside a highly reinforced case, which was named DS after "Double Security". These were the first watches to increase shock protection and water resistance to 6 m (previous watches were set at 2.2 metres). The watch was taken up the Himalayas by a team who climbed the Dhaulagiri and the watch withstood all changes in pressure and altitude.
- Biostar: In 1971 introduced the Biostar, the world's first watch that displayed human biorhythms.
- "Scratchproof" : produced the "unscratchable" DS-DiaMaster in tungsten carbide.

== Watch series ==
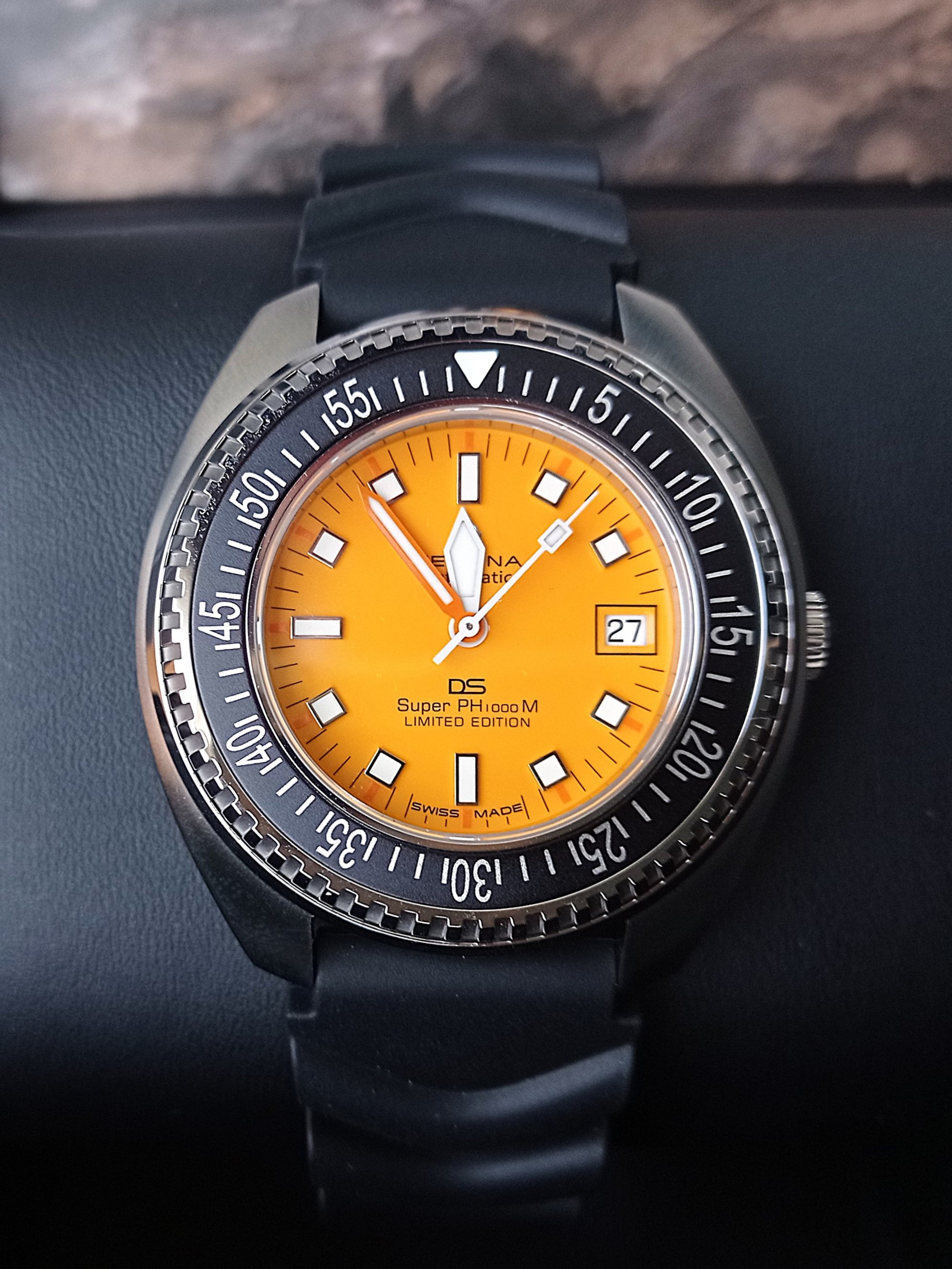
Certina DS Super PH1000M, 2023.

Sport Collection

- DS-2 : 2013 -
- DS Eagle
- DS Multi-8
- DS Podium
- DS Podium Big Size
- DS Podium Valgranges
- DS Sport

Aqua Collection

- DS Action
- DS Action Diver
- DS First

Urban Collection

- DS 4
- DS 4 Big Size
- DS-8 Chronograph Moon Phase
- DS Dream
- DS Prime
- DS Stella

Heritage Collection

- DS Caimano
- DS Powermatic 80 : 2014-
- DS-1

Diving Collection

- DS PH200M
- DS Super PH500M
- DS Super PH1000M

== Advanced Systems and Materials ==
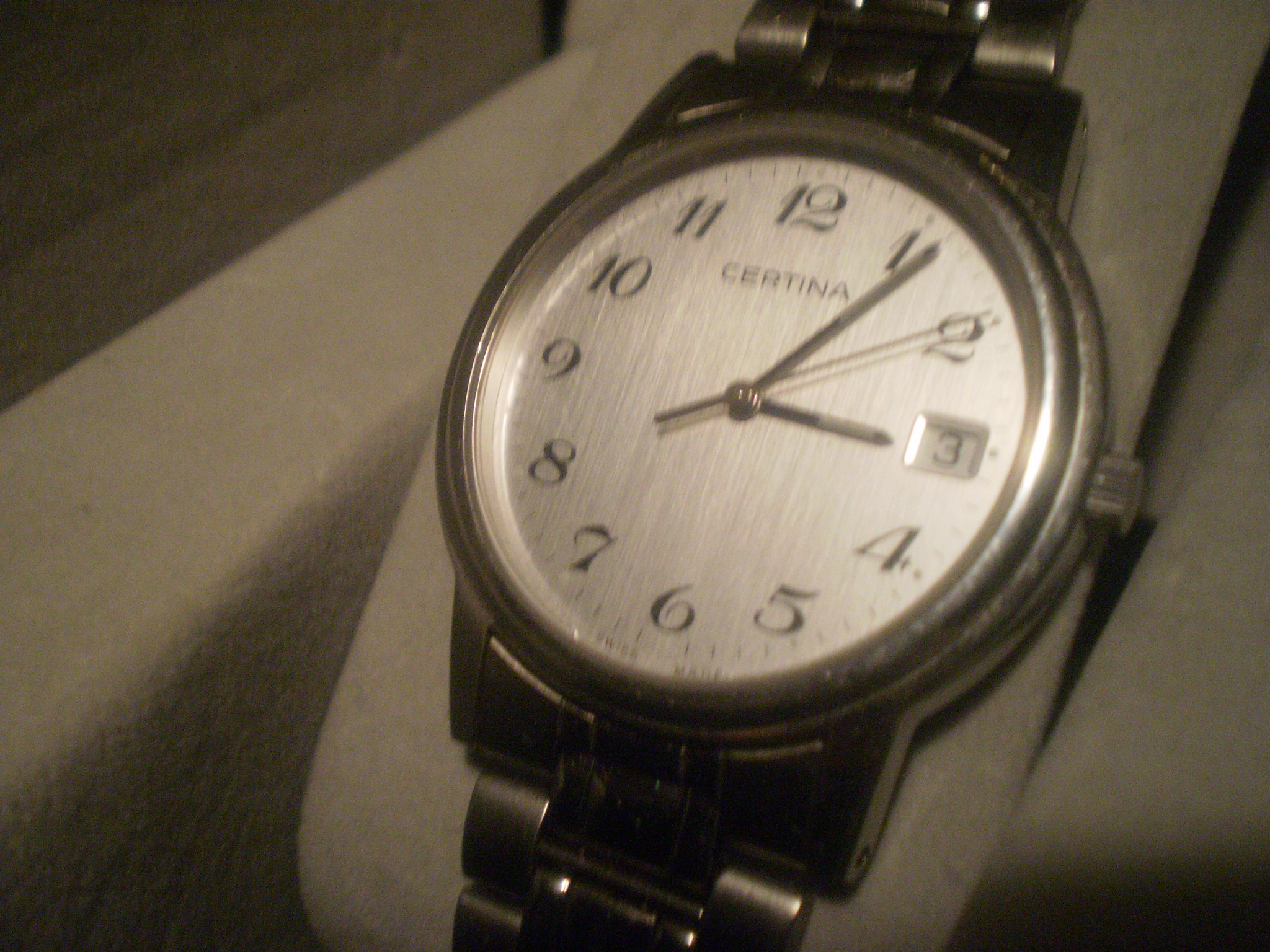
Certina Basic

Recent collection of Certina S.A. include Titanium, 316L high grade stainless steel, sapphire glass, its own DS feature (such as the current "DS Podium", "DS First" or "DS Action") and ETA Swiss made movements are standard features. It currently offers collections, classified under the names "Automatic", "SPORT Classic", "SPORT Elegant" and "SPORT Xtreme", including some models claimed to perform up to 300 m underwater.

== Marketing ==
Certina S.A. has partnered with motoring companies including Colin McRae, Sete Gibernau, Sauber Formula One team.

Certina S.A. was timekeeper of the Motorcycling Grand Prix in the 1990s.

Certina S.A. sponsored the 2014 World Rally Championship.

== The Certina brand ==
In 1906 the Certina brand name was used for the first time, with Adolf and Alfred choosing to call their watches "Grana", the short form of "Granatus", the Latin name for Grenchen.

In 1938 the company adopted the name "Certina", taken from the Latin "certus", meaning "assured", "certain", as their trademark for the export and marketing of their watches.

In 2014 Certina S.A. changed their red logo with a new logo. The new logo uses a turtle symbol, to symbolize protection against water and shocks. The change in logo and brand colours was because Certina S.A. wanted to move to a more expensive and higher quality segment, differentiating it from Tissot, another brand in the Swatch Group family. The impact of the changes in the brand has been the integration of better and more accurate movements like the PreciDrive in new releases.
