= 2024 Dubai 24 Hour =

Motorsports endurance race

The layout of the Dubai Autodrome.

The 2024 Hankook Dubai 24 Hour was the 19th running of the Dubai 24 Hour, an endurance race that took place at the Dubai Autodrome on 27 and 28 January 2024. It was the final round of the 2023–24 Middle East Trophy. Originally scheduled to 13 and 14 January, a change to the race date was announced on 27 December 2023, the Dubai 24 Hour becoming the season finale, due to shipping issues in the Bab-el-Mandeb Strait.

== Schedule ==
Date	Time (local: GST)	Event	Distance
Friday, 26 January	10:00–11:30	Free practice	90 mins
Friday, 26 January	14:40–15:35	Qualifying sessions – classes TCE & GT4	3 × 15 mins
Friday, 26 January	15:45–16:40	Qualifying sessions – classes GTX & 992	3 × 15 mins
Friday, 26 January	16:50–17:40	Qualifying sessions – class GT3	3 × 15 mins
Friday, 26 January	19:50–20:45	Night practice – All cars	90 mins
Saturday, 27 January	13:00	Race	24 hours
Sunday, 28 January	13:00	Race	24 hours

== Entry list ==
55 cars are entered into the event: 49 GT cars and 6 TCEs.

Team	Car	Engine	No.	Drivers	Class
GT3 (23 entries)
(Germany) racing one	Ferrari 296 GT3	Ferrari F163 3.0 L Turbo V6	6	(Italy) Giacomo Altoè (Germany) Stefan Aust (Germany) Steffen Görig (Italy) Marco Pulcini (Netherlands) Thierry Vermeulen	PA
(Germany) GetSpeed Performance	Mercedes-AMG GT3 Evo	Mercedes-AMG M159 6.2 L V8	9	(Oman) Al Faisal Al Zubair (United States) Anthony Bartone (Austria) Dominik Baumann (Austria) Martin Konrad (Germany) Fabian Schiller	P
(Australia) EBM – Grove Racing	Mercedes-AMG GT3 Evo	Mercedes-AMG M159 6.2 L V8	10	(Australia) Brenton Grove (Australia) Stephen Grove (United Kingdom) Phil Keen (Australia) Jordan Love (New Zealand) Matthew Payne	P
(United Kingdom) Century Motorsport	BMW M4 GT3	BMW S58B30T0 3.0 L Turbo V8	14	(Indonesia) Sean Gelael (United Kingdom) Michael Johnston (United Kingdom) Darren Leung (United Kingdom) Christopher Salkeld	Am
(United Kingdom) Century Motorsport	BMW M4 GT3	BMW S58B30T0 3.0 L Turbo V8	22	(United Kingdom) Jack Barlow (United Kingdom) Carl Cavers (United Kingdom) Lewis Plato (United Kingdom) Jake Rattenbury	PA
(Germany) MRS-GT Racing	Porsche 911 GT3 R (991.2)	Porsche 4.0 L Flat-6	17	(Saint Kitts and Nevis) Alexander Bukhantsov (Note: Borisov, Bukhantsov, Dzhalilov, Mavlanov, Minsky, Bulatov, Salikhov, Shaytar, Solukovtsev, Stanchin and Lomko, also Russians, compete under an Armenian, a Kittian, a Slovak, a German, a Kyrgyz and a Grenadian licence respectively as Russian national emblems were banned by the FIA following the Russian invasion of Ukraine.) (Australia) John Corbett (United Kingdom) George King (United Kingdom) James Winslow	PA
(France) Saintéloc Junior Team	Audi R8 LMS Evo II	Audi 5.2 L V10	18	(Austria) Michael Doppelmayr (Germany) Elia Erhart (Germany) Sven Herberger (Germany) Pierre Kaffer	PA
(France) Saintéloc Junior Team	Audi R8 LMS Evo II	Audi 5.2 L V10	26	(France) Mattéo Merafina (France) Thomas Merafina (France) Wilfried Merafina	Am
(Antigua and Barbuda) HAAS RT	Audi R8 LMS Evo II	Audi 5.2 L V10	21	(Belgium) Mathieu Detry (Germany) Thomas Kiefer (Germany) Torsten Kratz (Kyrgyzstan) Stanislav Minsky (Finland) Miika Panu	Am
(United States) Heart of Racing by SPS	Mercedes-AMG GT3 Evo	Mercedes-AMG M159 6.2 L V8	27	(Brazil) Pierre Kleinubing (Italy) Daniel Mancinelli (United States) Gray Newell (United Kingdom) Darren Turner	PA
(United Kingdom) Team Parker Racing	Bentley Continental GT3	Bentley 4.0 L Turbo V8	31	(United Kingdom) Robert Huff (United Kingdom) Max Lynn (United Kingdom) Shaun Lynn (United Kingdom) Joe Wheeler	PA
(United Arab Emirates) S'Aalocin by Kox Racing	Porsche 911 GT3 R (991.2)	Porsche 4.0 L Flat-6	48	(Belgium) Tom Boonen (Netherlands) Peter Kox (Netherlands) Stéphane Kox (Netherlands) Nico Pronk (Netherlands) Dennis Retera	PA
(Germany) Huber Motorsport	Porsche 911 GT3 R (992)	Porsche M97/80 4.2 L Flat-6	50	(United States) Jason Hart (United States) Scott Noble (United States) Florian Spengler (Germany) Hans Wehrmann	PA
(Austria) Eastalent Racing Team	Audi R8 LMS Evo II	Audi 5.2 L V10	54	(Germany) Christopher Haase (Belgium) Gilles Magnus (Austria) Simon Reicher (Germany) Markus Winkelhock (China) Mike Zhou	P
(Germany) Leipert Motorsport	Lamborghini Huracán GT3 Evo 2	Lamborghini DGF 5.2 L V10	63	(New Zealand) Brendon Leitch (Italy) Marco Mapelli (Luxembourg) Gabriele Rindone (France) Alban Varutti	PA
(United Arab Emirates) OJ Lifestyle Racing by 7TSIX	McLaren 720S GT3 Evo	McLaren M840T 4.0 L Turbo V8	76	(Austria) Philipp Baron (United Kingdom) Omar Jackson (Zimbabwe) Axcil Jefferies (Australia) George Nakas (Australia) Fraser Ross	PA
(Germany) Proton Huber Competition	Porsche 911 GT3 R (992)	Porsche M97/80 4.2 L Flat-6	83	(Armenia) Sergei Borisov (Germany) Sven Müller (Armenia) Rinat Salikhov (Armenia) Viktor Shaytar	PA
(United States) CP Racing	Mercedes-AMG GT3 Evo	Mercedes-AMG M159 6.2 L V8	85	(United States) Charles Espenlaub (United States) Joe Foster (United States) Darren Law (United States) Shane Lewis (United States) Charles Putman	Am
(United Kingdom) ROFGO with Dragon Racing	Ferrari 296 GT3	Ferrari F163 3.0 L Turbo V6	88	(Denmark) Benjamin Goethe (Denmark) Oliver Goethe (Germany) Roald Goethe (South Africa) Jordan Grogor (United Kingdom) Stuart Hall	P
(Germany) Herberth Motorsport	Porsche 911 GT3 R (992)	Porsche M97/80 4.2 L Flat-6	91	(Switzerland) Daniel Allemann (Germany) Ralf Bohn (Germany) Alfred Renauer (Germany) Robert Renauer	PA
(United Arab Emirates) Manamauri Energy by Ebimotors	Porsche 911 GT3 R (992)	Porsche M97/80 4.2 L Flat-6	95	(Italy) Fabrizio Broggi (Italy) Sabino de Castro (Romania) Sergiu Nicolae (Italy) Cosimo Papi	PA
(Germany) Car Collection Motorsport	Porsche 911 GT3 R (992)	Porsche M97/80 4.2 L Flat-6	96	(United States) Dustin Blattner (Italy) Sebastian Gorga (Germany) Dennis Marschall (Lebanon) Fuad Sawaya (Germany) Mark Wallenwein	PA
(Germany) Attempto Racing	Audi R8 LMS Evo II	Audi 5.2 L V10	99	(Germany) Alex Aka (Switzerland) Ricardo Feller; Andrey Mukovoz (Note: SMP Racing along with Bolduev, Bukhantsov, Denisov, Gadetskii, Krapivtsev, Loboda, Mavlanov, Mukovoz, Muraveika, Petrov, Pogosyan, Remenyako, Sirotkin, Smolyar and Titarenko are Russian, but they compete as neutral competitors as Russian national emblems were banned by the FIA following the Russian invasion of Ukraine.) (Luxembourg) Dylan Pereira; Sergey Titarenko	P
GTX (3 entries)
(France) Vortex V8	Vortex 2.0	Chevrolet LS3 6.2 L V8	701	(France) Lionel Amrouche (France) Philippe Bonnel (France) Arnaud Gomez (France) Olivier Gomez	
(Austria) Razoon – More than Racing	KTM X-Bow GT2 Concept	Audi 2.5 L I5	714	(Poland) Arthur Chwist (Austria) Daniel Drexel (South Africa) Mikaeel Pitamber (Kuwait) Haytham Qarajouli (United States) Kevin Woods	
(United Kingdom) Toro Verde GT	Ginetta G56 Cup	GM LS3 6.2 L V8	795	(France) Nico Prost (United Kingdom) Mike Simpson (United Kingdom) Freddie Tomlinson (United Kingdom) Lawrence Tomlinson	
992 (20 entries)
(Germany) PROsport Racing	Porsche 992 GT3 Cup	Porsche 4.0 L Flat-6	901	(Belgium) Simon Balcaen (Belgium) Guillaume Dumarey (France) Steven Palette (Germany) Jörg Viebahn	Am
(Denmark) Holmgaard Motorsport	Porsche 992 GT3 Cup	Porsche 4.0 L Flat-6	902	(Australia) Darren Currie (Australia) Axle Donaldson (Denmark) Jonas Holmgaard (Denmark) Magnus Holmgaard (Denmark) Patrick Steen Rasmussen	P
(Belgium) Redant Racing	Porsche 992 GT3 Cup	Porsche 4.0 L Flat-6	903	(Belgium) Peter Guelinckx (Belgium) Jef Machiels (Belgium) Ayrton Redant (Belgium) Yannick Redant	P
(Germany) RPM Racing	Porsche 992 GT3 Cup	Porsche 4.0 L Flat-6	907	(Sweden) Niclas Jönsson (Germany) Philip Hamprecht (Netherlands) Patrick Huisman (United States) Tracy Krohn	Am
(France) SebLajoux Racing by DUWO Racing	Porsche 992 GT3 Cup	Porsche 4.0 L Flat-6	908	(France) Sebastien Lajoux (Belgium) Benjamin Paque (France) Stéphane Perrin (Netherlands) Flynt Schuring (France) Lucas Walter	Am
(Netherlands) Red Camel-Jordans.nl	Porsche 992 GT3 Cup	Porsche 4.0 L Flat-6	909	(Netherlands) Ivo Breukers (Netherlands) Luc Breukers (Netherlands) Rik Breukers (Switzerland) Fabian Danz	P
(Belgium) Mühlner Motorsport	Porsche 992 GT3 Cup	Porsche 4.0 L Flat-6	921	(United Arab Emirates) Keanu Al Azhari (Grenada) Vladislav Lomko (United States) Bryan Sircely (France) Gilles Vannelet	P
(Netherlands) Team Captain America by Bas Koeten Racing	Porsche 992 GT3 Cup	Porsche 4.0 L Flat-6	925	(United States) Richard Edge (United States) Curt Swearingin (United States) Grant Talkie (United States) Pedro Torres (Netherlands) Kay van Berlo	Am
(Netherlands) NKPP Racing by Bas Koeten	Porsche 992 GT3 Cup	Porsche 4.0 L Flat-6	992	(Netherlands) Gjis Bessem (Netherlands) Bob Herber (Netherlands) Gjis Bessem (Finland) Kari-Pekka Laaksonen	Am
(Germany) SRS Team Sorg Rennsport	Porsche 992 GT3 Cup	Porsche 4.0 L Flat-6	927	(Germany) Stefan Beyer (Switzerland) Patrik Grütter (Ukraine) Oleksiy Kikireshko (Germany) Marlon Menden	Am
(Germany) HRT Performance	Porsche 992 GT3 Cup	Porsche 4.0 L Flat-6	929	(United Kingdom) Jamie Day (United States) Gregg Gorski (Germany) Holger Harmsen (China) Liang Jiatong	P
(Germany) HRT Performance	Porsche 992 GT3 Cup	Porsche 4.0 L Flat-6	930	(France) Stéphane Adler (France) Michael Blanchemain (France) Jérôme Da Costa (France) Franck Eburderie (France) Franck Lavergne	Am
QMMF by HRT Suhail Qatar	Porsche 992 GT3 Cup	Porsche 4.0 L Flat-6	931	(Qatar) Ibrahim Al-Abdulghani (Qatar) Abdulla Ali Al-Khelaifi (Qatar) Ghanim Ali Al Maadheed (Germany) Julian Hanses	Am
(Germany) KKrämer Racing	Porsche 992 GT3 Cup	Porsche 4.0 L Flat-6	936	(Germany) Christopher Brueck (Germany) Michele di Martino (Germany) Karsten Krämer (Germany) Fidel Leib; Denis Remenyako	Am
SMP Racing	Porsche 992 GT3 Cup	Porsche 4.0 L Flat-6	937	Aleksandr Bolduev; Vitaly Petrov; Denis Remenyako; Sergey Sirotkin; Alexander Smolyar	P
(Switzerland) Fach Auto Tech	Porsche 992 GT3 Cup	Porsche 4.0 L Flat-6	961	(Belgium) Marc Devis (Germany) Michael Hinderer (Switzerland) Yves Scemama (Switzerland) Christian Traber (Belgium) Nico Verdonck	Am
(Switzerland) Fach Auto Tech	Porsche 992 GT3 Cup	Porsche 4.0 L Flat-6	962	(Netherlands) Paul Meijer (Netherlands) Ralph Poppelaars (Netherlands) Jop Rappange (Netherlands) Huub van Eijndhoven	P
(United Arab Emirates) RABDAN by Fulgenzi Racing	Porsche 992 GT3 Cup	Porsche 4.0 L Flat-6	971	(United Arab Emirates) Saif Alameri (United Arab Emirates) Salem Alketbi (United Arab Emirates) Helal Al Mazrouei (United Arab Emirates) Fahad Alzaab (Austria) Christopher Zöchling	Am
(Austria) Neuhofer Rennsport by MRS GT-Racing	Porsche 992 GT3 Cup	Porsche 4.0 L Flat-6	988	(Austria) Felix Neuhofer (Austria) Markus Neuhofer (Austria) Martin Ragginger (Austria) Helmut Roedig	P
(Germany) MRS GT-Racing	Porsche 992 GT3 Cup	Porsche 4.0 L Flat-6	989	(Kazakhstan) Alexandr Artemyev; Alexey Denisov; Nikolai Gadetskii (Estonia) Antti Rammo	Am
GT4 (3 entries)
(United Kingdom) Century Motorsport	BMW M4 GT4 Gen II	BMW N55 3.0 L Twin-Turbo I6	429	(United Kingdom) Nick Halstead (United Kingdom) David Holloway (United Kingdom) Piers Johnson (Australia) Rianna O’Meara-Hunt	
(United Kingdom) AGMC Racing Team by Simpson Motorsport	BMW M4 GT4 Gen II	BMW N55 3.0 L Twin-Turbo I6	438	(United Kingdom) Hugo Cook (Belgium) Fabian Duffieux (Kyrgyzstan) Artur Dzhalilov (Kyrgyzstan) Ivan Krapivtsev (Australia) Cameron McLeod	
(United Arab Emirates) Continental Racing	Toyota GR Supra GT4 Evo	BMW B58B30 3.0 L Twin-Turbo I6	496	Mikhail Loboda; David Pogosyan (Kyrgyzstan) Andrey Solukovtsev (Cyprus) Vasily Vladykin	
TCR (2 entries)
(United Kingdom) Simpson Motorsport	Audi RS 3 LMS TCR (2017)	Volkswagen EA888 2.0 L I4	138	(United Arab Emirates) Ahmed Al Khaja (United Kingdom) Kavi Jundu; Andrei Muraveika (Kyrgyzstan) Ivan Stanchin (United Arab Emirates) Nadir Zuhour	
(Belgium) AC Motorsport	Audi RS 3 LMS TCR (2021)	Volkswagen EA888 2.0 L I4	138	(France) Thierry Chkondali (United Kingdom) James Kaye (Belgium) Kobe Pauwels (Netherlands) Paul Sieljes (Latvia) Ivars Vallers	
TCX (4 entries)
(Italy) Lotus PB Racing	Lotus Elise Cup PB-R	Toyota 1.4 L I4	226	(Italy) Maurizio Copetti (Italy) Stefano d'Aste (Italy) Stefano Moretti (Monaco) Vito Utzieri	
(Germany) SRS Team Sorg Rennsport	Porsche 718 Cayman GT4 Clubsport	Porsche 4.0 L Flat-6	227	(Switzerland) Gero Bauknecht (United States) José Garcia (Germany) Patrick Kolb (Germany) Christoph Krombach (Mexico) Benito Tagle	
(United Kingdom) CWS Engineering	Ginetta G55 Supercup	Ford Cyclone 3.7 L V6	277	(Spain) Christian Broberg (Australia) Mark Griffith (United Kingdom) Tom Holland (United Kingdom) JM Littman (United Kingdom) Colin White	
(United Kingdom) CWS Engineering	Ginetta G55 Supercup	Ford Cyclone 3.7 L V6	278	(Australia) Mark Griffith (United Kingdom) Owen Hizzey (United Kingdom) Tom Holland (United Kingdom) Daniel Morris (United Kingdom) Colin White	

GT3 entries
Icon	Class
P	GT3-Pro
PA	GT3-Pro Am
Am	GT3-Am
992 entries
Icon	Class
P	992-Pro
Am	992-Am

== Results ==
=== Qualifying ===
Pole positions in each class are denoted in bold.

==== GT3 ====
Fastest in class in **bold**.

Pos.	Class	No.	Team	Time	Grid
1	**GT3-Pro Am**	**18**	**(France) Saintéloc Junior Team**	**1:59.807**	**1**
2	GT3-Pro Am	63	(Germany) Leipert Motorsport	1:59.871	2
3	**GT3-Am**	**21**	**(Antigua and Barbuda) HAAS RT**	**1:59.976**	**3**
4	**GT3-Pro**	**9**	**(Germany) GetSpeed Performance**	**2:00.027**	**4**
5	GT3-Pro Am	95	(United Arab Emirates) Manamauri Energy by Ebimotors	2:00.201	5
6	GT3-Pro	54	(Austria) Eastalent Racing Team	2:00.323	6
7	GT3-Pro Am	6	(Germany) racing one	2:00.415	7
8	GT3-Pro Am	91	(Germany) Herberth Motorsport	2:00.679	8
9	GT3-Pro	83	(Germany) Proton Huber Competition	2:00.714	9
10	GT3-Pro	10	(Australia) EBM – Grove Racing	2:00.834	10
11	GT3-Pro Am	96	(Germany) Car Collection Motorsport	2:00.848	11
12	GT3-Pro Am	27	(United States) Heart of Racing by SPS	2:00.889	12
13	GT3-Pro	99	(Germany) Attempto Racing	2:01.017	13
14	GT3-Pro Am	22	(United Kingdom) Century Motorsport	2:01.347	14
15	GT3-Pro Am	18	(France) Saintéloc Junior Team	2:01.426	15
16	GT3-Am	14	(United Kingdom) Century Motorsport	2:01.579	16
17	GT3-Am	50	(Germany) Huber Motorsport	2:01.630	17
18	GT3-Am	85	(United States) CP Racing	2:01.683	18
19	GT3-Pro Am	76	(United Arab Emirates) OJ Lifestyle Racing by 7TSIX	2:02.020	19
20	GT3-Am	17	(Germany) MRS-GT Racing	2:02.112	20
21	GT3-Pro Am	31	(United Kingdom) Team Parker Racing	2:02.285	21
22	GT3-Pro	88	(United Arab Emirates) Dragon Racing	2:02.295	22
23	GT3-Am	48	(United Arab Emirates) S'Aalocin by Kox Racing	2:02.376	23

==== GTX & 992 ====
Fastest in class in **bold**.

Pos.	Class	No.	Team	Time	Grid
1	**GTX**	**701**	**(France) Vortex V8**	**2:03.381**	**24**
2	GTX	714	(Austria) Razoon – More than Racing	2:03.535	25
3	**992-Pro**	**937**	**SMP Racing**	**2:04.015**	**26**
4	992-Pro	909	(Netherlands) Red Camel-Jordans.nl	2:04.033	27
5	**992-Am**	**925**	**(Netherlands) Team Captain America by Bas Koeten Racing**	**2:04.455**	**28**
6	GTX	795	(United Kingdom) Toro Verde GT	2:04.480	29
7	992-Am	901	(Germany) PROsport Racing	2:04.496	30
8	992-Pro	988	(Austria) Neuhofer Rennsport by MRS GT-Racing	2:04.652	31
9	992-Am	908	(France) SebLajoux Racing by DUWO Racing	2:04.694	32
10	992-Pro	962	(Switzerland) Fach Auto Tech	2:04.706	33
11	992-Pro	921	(Belgium) Mühlner Motorsport	2:05.122	34
12	992-Am	971	(United Arab Emirates) RABDAN by Fulgenzi Racing	2:04.273	35
13	992-Am	936	(Germany) KKrämer Racing	2:04.275	36
14	992-Am	931	QMMF by HRT Suhail Qatar	2:05.377	37
15	992-Pro	903	(Belgium) Red Ant Racing	2:05.473	38
16	992-Pro	929	(Germany) HRT Performance	2:05.700	39
17	992-Am	907	(Germany) RPM Racing	2:06.014	40
18	992-Am	927	(Germany) SRS Team Sorg Rennsport	2:06.279	41
19	992-Pro	902	(Denmark) Holmgaard Motorsport	2:06.463	42
20	992-Am	989	(Germany) MRS-GT Racing	2:07.324	43
21	992-Am	992	(Netherlands) NKPP Racing by Bas Koeten	2:07.415	44
22	992-Am	930	(Germany) HRT Performance	2:08.041	45
23	992-Am	961	(Switzerland) Fach Auto Tech	2:09.024	46

==== GT4 & TCE ====
Fastest in class in bold.

Pos.	Class	No.	Team	Time	Grid
1	**GT4**	**438**	**(United Kingdom) AGMC Racing Team by Simpson Motorsport**	**2:10.000**	**47**
2	GT4	496	(United Arab Emirates) Continental Racing	2:10.040	48
3	GT4	429	(United Kingdom) Century Motorsport	2:10.355	49
4	**TCX**	**278**	**(United Kingdom) CWS Engineering**	**2:11.154**	**50**
5	**TCR**	**188**	**(Belgium) AC Motorsport**	**2:12.738**	**51**
6	TCX	277	(United Kingdom) CWS Engineering	2:13.044	52
7	TCR	138	(United Kingdom) Simpson Motorsport	2:14.059	53
8	TCX	227	(Germany) SRS Team Sorg Rennsport	2:15.483	55
9	TCX	226	(Italy) Lotus PB Racing	2:23.550	54

=== Race ===
Class winner in bold.

Pos	Class	No.	Team	Drivers	Chassis	Time/Reason	Laps
Pos	Class	No.	Team	Drivers	Engine	Time/Reason	Laps
1	**GT3-Pro**	**54**	**(Austria) Eastalent Racing Team**	**(Germany) Christopher Haase (Belgium) Gilles Magnus (Austria) Simon Reicher (Germany) Markus Winkelhock (China) Mike Zhou**	**Audi R8 LMS Evo II**	**24:00:58.514**	**603**
1	**GT3-Pro**	**54**	**(Austria) Eastalent Racing Team**	**(Germany) Christopher Haase (Belgium) Gilles Magnus (Austria) Simon Reicher (Germany) Markus Winkelhock (China) Mike Zhou**	**Audi 5.2 L V10**	**24:00:58.514**	**603**
2	GT3-Pro	83	(Germany) Proton Huber Competition	(Armenia) Sergei Borisov (Germany) Sven Müller (Armenia) Rinat Salikhov (Armenia) Viktor Shaytar	Porsche 911 GT3 R (992)	+1:36.207	603
2	GT3-Pro	83	(Germany) Proton Huber Competition	(Armenia) Sergei Borisov (Germany) Sven Müller (Armenia) Rinat Salikhov (Armenia) Viktor Shaytar	Porsche M97/80 4.2 L Flat-6	+1:36.207	603
3	**GT3-Pro Am**	**10**	**(United Kingdom) Century Motorsport**	**(United Kingdom) Jack Barlow (United Kingdom) Carl Cavers (United Kingdom) Lewis Plato (United Kingdom) Jake Rattenbury**	**BMW M4 GT3**	**+4 Laps**	**599**
3	**GT3-Pro Am**	**10**	**(United Kingdom) Century Motorsport**	**(United Kingdom) Jack Barlow (United Kingdom) Carl Cavers (United Kingdom) Lewis Plato (United Kingdom) Jake Rattenbury**	**BMW S58B30T0 3.0 L Turbo I6**	**+4 Laps**	**599**
4	GT3-Pro Am	95	(United Arab Emirates) Manamauri Energy by Ebimotors	(Italy) Fabrizio Broggi (Italy) Sabino de Castro (Romania) Sergiu Nicolae (Italy) Cosimo Papi	Porsche 911 GT3 R (992)	+5 Laps	598
4	GT3-Pro Am	95	(United Arab Emirates) Manamauri Energy by Ebimotors	(Italy) Fabrizio Broggi (Italy) Sabino de Castro (Romania) Sergiu Nicolae (Italy) Cosimo Papi	Porsche M97/80 4.2 L Flat-6	+5 Laps	598
5	**GT3-Am**	**14**	**(United Kingdom) Century Motorsport**	**(Indonesia) Sean Gelael (United Kingdom) Michael Johnston (United Kingdom) Darren Leung (United Kingdom) Christopher Salkeld**	**BMW M4 GT3**	**+6 Laps**	**597**
5	**GT3-Am**	**14**	**(United Kingdom) Century Motorsport**	**(Indonesia) Sean Gelael (United Kingdom) Michael Johnston (United Kingdom) Darren Leung (United Kingdom) Christopher Salkeld**	**BMW S58B30T0 3.0 L Turbo I6**	**+6 Laps**	**597**
6	GT3-Pro Am	96	(Germany) Car Collection Motorsport	(United States) Dustin Blattner (Italy) Sebastian Gorga (Germany) Dennis Marschall (Lebanon) Fuad Sawaya (Germany) Mark Wallenwein	Porsche 911 GT3 R (992)	+7 Laps	596
6	GT3-Pro Am	96	(Germany) Car Collection Motorsport	(United States) Dustin Blattner (Italy) Sebastian Gorga (Germany) Dennis Marschall (Lebanon) Fuad Sawaya (Germany) Mark Wallenwein	Porsche M97/80 4.2 L Flat-6	+7 Laps	596
7	GT3-Am	26	(France) Saintéloc Junior Team	(France) Mattéo Merafina (France) Thomas Merafina (France) Wilfried Merafina	Audi R8 LMS Evo II	+8 Laps	595
7	GT3-Am	26	(France) Saintéloc Junior Team	(France) Mattéo Merafina (France) Thomas Merafina (France) Wilfried Merafina	Audi 5.2 L V10	+8 Laps	595
8	GT3-Am	21	(Antigua and Barbuda) HAAS RT	(Belgium) Mathieu Detry (Germany) Thomas Kiefer (Germany) Torsten Kratz (Kyrgyzstan) Stanislav Minsky (Finland) Miika Panu	Audi R8 LMS Evo II	+8 Laps	595
8	GT3-Am	21	(Antigua and Barbuda) HAAS RT	(Belgium) Mathieu Detry (Germany) Thomas Kiefer (Germany) Torsten Kratz (Kyrgyzstan) Stanislav Minsky (Finland) Miika Panu	Audi 5.2 L V10	+8 Laps	595
9	GT3-Am	50	(Germany) Huber Motorsport	(United States) Jason Hart (United States) Scott Noble (United States) Florian Spengler (Germany) Hans Wehrmann	Porsche 911 GT3 R (992)	+15 Laps	588
9	GT3-Am	50	(Germany) Huber Motorsport	(United States) Jason Hart (United States) Scott Noble (United States) Florian Spengler (Germany) Hans Wehrmann	Porsche M97/80 4.2 L Flat-6	+15 Laps	588
10	GT3-Pro Am	31	(United Kingdom) Team Parker Racing	(United Kingdom) Robert Huff (United Kingdom) Max Lynn (United Kingdom) Shaun Lynn (United Kingdom) Joe Wheeler	Bentley Continental GT3	+16 Laps	587
10	GT3-Pro Am	31	(United Kingdom) Team Parker Racing	(United Kingdom) Robert Huff (United Kingdom) Max Lynn (United Kingdom) Shaun Lynn (United Kingdom) Joe Wheeler	Bentley 4.0 L Turbo V8	+16 Laps	587
11	**992-Pro**	**909**	**(Netherlands) Red Camel-Jordans.nl**	**(Netherlands) Ivo Breukers (Netherlands) Luc Breukers (Netherlands) Rik Breukers (Switzerland) Fabian Danz**	**Porsche 992 GT3 Cup**	**+19 Laps**	**584**
11	**992-Pro**	**909**	**(Netherlands) Red Camel-Jordans.nl**	**(Netherlands) Ivo Breukers (Netherlands) Luc Breukers (Netherlands) Rik Breukers (Switzerland) Fabian Danz**	**Porsche 4.0 L Flat-6**	**+19 Laps**	**584**
12	**992-Am**	**931**	**QMMF by HRT Suhail Qatar**	**(Qatar) Ibrahim Al-Abdulghani (Qatar) Abdulla Ali Al-Khelaifi (Qatar) Ghanim Ali Al Maadheed (Germany) Julian Hanses**	**Porsche 992 GT3 Cup**	**+20 Laps**	**583**
12	**992-Am**	**931**	**QMMF by HRT Suhail Qatar**	**(Qatar) Ibrahim Al-Abdulghani (Qatar) Abdulla Ali Al-Khelaifi (Qatar) Ghanim Ali Al Maadheed (Germany) Julian Hanses**	**Porsche 4.0 L Flat-6**	**+20 Laps**	**583**
13	992-Pro	962	(Switzerland) Fach Auto Tech	(Netherlands) Paul Meijer (Netherlands) Ralph Poppelaars (Netherlands) Jop Rappange (Netherlands) Huub van Eijndhoven	Porsche 992 GT3 Cup	+23 Laps	580
13	992-Pro	962	(Switzerland) Fach Auto Tech	(Netherlands) Paul Meijer (Netherlands) Ralph Poppelaars (Netherlands) Jop Rappange (Netherlands) Huub van Eijndhoven	Porsche 4.0 L Flat-6	+23 Laps	580
14	992-Pro	903	(Belgium) Redant Racing	(Belgium) Peter Guelinckx (Belgium) Jef Machiels (Belgium) Ayrton Redant (Belgium) Yannick Redant	Porsche 992 GT3 Cup	+24 Laps	579
14	992-Pro	903	(Belgium) Redant Racing	(Belgium) Peter Guelinckx (Belgium) Jef Machiels (Belgium) Ayrton Redant (Belgium) Yannick Redant	Porsche 4.0 L Flat-6	+24 Laps	579
15	992-Am	907	(Germany) RPM Racing	(Sweden) Niclas Jönsson (Germany) Philip Hamprecht (Netherlands) Patrick Huisman (United States) Tracy Krohn	Porsche 992 GT3 Cup	+26 Laps	577
15	992-Am	907	(Germany) RPM Racing	(Sweden) Niclas Jönsson (Germany) Philip Hamprecht (Netherlands) Patrick Huisman (United States) Tracy Krohn	Porsche 4.0 L Flat-6	+26 Laps	577
16	992-Am	971	(United Arab Emirates) RABDAN by Fulgenzi Racing	(United Arab Emirates) Saif Alameri (United Arab Emirates) Salem Alketbi (United Arab Emirates) Helal Al Mazrouei (United Arab Emirates) Fahad Alzaab (Austria) Christopher Zöchling	Porsche 992 GT3 Cup	+28 Laps	575
16	992-Am	971	(United Arab Emirates) RABDAN by Fulgenzi Racing	(United Arab Emirates) Saif Alameri (United Arab Emirates) Salem Alketbi (United Arab Emirates) Helal Al Mazrouei (United Arab Emirates) Fahad Alzaab (Austria) Christopher Zöchling	Porsche 4.0 L Flat-6	+28 Laps	575
17	992-Am	992	(Netherlands) NKPP Racing by Bas Koeten	(Netherlands) Gjis Bessem (Netherlands) Bob Herber (Netherlands) Gjis Bessem (Finland) Kari-Pekka Laaksonen	Porsche 992 GT3 Cup	+32 Laps	571
17	992-Am	992	(Netherlands) NKPP Racing by Bas Koeten	(Netherlands) Gjis Bessem (Netherlands) Bob Herber (Netherlands) Gjis Bessem (Finland) Kari-Pekka Laaksonen	Porsche 4.0 L Flat-6	+32 Laps	571
18	GT3-Pro Am	27	(United States) Heart of Racing by SPS	(Brazil) Pierre Kleinubing (Italy) Daniel Mancinelli (United States) Gray Newell (United Kingdom) Darren Turner	Mercedes-AMG GT3 Evo	+33 Laps	570
18	GT3-Pro Am	27	(United States) Heart of Racing by SPS	(Brazil) Pierre Kleinubing (Italy) Daniel Mancinelli (United States) Gray Newell (United Kingdom) Darren Turner	Mercedes-AMG M159 6.2 L V8	+33 Laps	570
19	992-Pro	929	(Germany) HRT Performance	(United Kingdom) Jamie Day (United States) Gregg Gorski (Germany) Holger Harmsen (China) Liang Jiatong	Porsche 992 GT3 Cup	+33 Laps	570
19	992-Pro	929	(Germany) HRT Performance	(United Kingdom) Jamie Day (United States) Gregg Gorski (Germany) Holger Harmsen (China) Liang Jiatong	Porsche 4.0 L Flat-6	+33 Laps	570
20	**GTX**	**795**	**(United Kingdom) Toro Verde GT**	**(France) Nico Prost (United Kingdom) Mike Simpson (United Kingdom) Freddie Tomlinson (United Kingdom) Lawrence Tomlinson**	**Ginetta G56 Cup**	**+33 Laps**	**570**
20	**GTX**	**795**	**(United Kingdom) Toro Verde GT**	**(France) Nico Prost (United Kingdom) Mike Simpson (United Kingdom) Freddie Tomlinson (United Kingdom) Lawrence Tomlinson**	**GM LS3 6.2 L V8**	**+33 Laps**	**570**
21	992-Am	901	(Germany) PROsport Racing	(Belgium) Simon Balcaen (Belgium) Guillaume Dumarey (France) Steven Palette (Germany) Jörg Viebahn	Porsche 992 GT3 Cup	+33 Laps	570
21	992-Am	901	(Germany) PROsport Racing	(Belgium) Simon Balcaen (Belgium) Guillaume Dumarey (France) Steven Palette (Germany) Jörg Viebahn	Porsche 4.0 L Flat-6	+33 Laps	570
22	992-Am	925	(Netherlands) Team Captain America by Bas Koeten Racing	(United States) Richard Edge (United States) Curt Swearingin (United States) Grant Talkie (United States) Pedro Torres (Netherlands) Kay van Berlo	Porsche 992 GT3 Cup	+34 Laps	569
22	992-Am	925	(Netherlands) Team Captain America by Bas Koeten Racing	(United States) Richard Edge (United States) Curt Swearingin (United States) Grant Talkie (United States) Pedro Torres (Netherlands) Kay van Berlo	Porsche 4.0 L Flat-6	+34 Laps	569
23	992-Pro	937	SMP Racing	Aleksandr Bolduev; Vitaly Petrov; Denis Remenyako; Sergey Sirotkin; Alexander Smolyar	Porsche 992 GT3 Cup	+38 Laps	565
23	992-Pro	937	SMP Racing	Aleksandr Bolduev; Vitaly Petrov; Denis Remenyako; Sergey Sirotkin; Alexander Smolyar	Porsche 4.0 L Flat-6	+38 Laps	565
24	992-Am	930	(Germany) HRT Performance	(France) Stéphane Adler (France) Michael Blanchemain (France) Jérôme Da Costa (France) Franck Eburderie (France) Franck Lavergne	Porsche 992 GT3 Cup	+49 Laps	554
24	992-Am	930	(Germany) HRT Performance	(France) Stéphane Adler (France) Michael Blanchemain (France) Jérôme Da Costa (France) Franck Eburderie (France) Franck Lavergne	Porsche 4.0 L Flat-6	+49 Laps	554
25	992-Am	961	(Switzerland) Fach Auto Tech	(Belgium) Marc Devis (Germany) Michael Hinderer (Switzerland) Yves Scemama (Switzerland) Christian Traber (Belgium) Nico Verdonck	Porsche 992 GT3 Cup	+49 Laps	554
25	992-Am	961	(Switzerland) Fach Auto Tech	(Belgium) Marc Devis (Germany) Michael Hinderer (Switzerland) Yves Scemama (Switzerland) Christian Traber (Belgium) Nico Verdonck	Porsche 4.0 L Flat-6	+49 Laps	554
26	GT3-Am	85	(United States) CP Racing	(United States) Charles Espenlaub (United States) Joe Foster (United States) Darren Law (United States) Shane Lewis (United States) Charles Putman	Mercedes-AMG GT3 Evo	+52 Laps	551
26	GT3-Am	85	(United States) CP Racing	(United States) Charles Espenlaub (United States) Joe Foster (United States) Darren Law (United States) Shane Lewis (United States) Charles Putman	Mercedes-AMG M159 6.2 L V8	+52 Laps	551
27	**GT4**	**496**	**(United Arab Emirates) Continental Racing**	**Mikhail Loboda; David Pogosyan (Kyrgyzstan) Andrey Solukovtsev (Cyprus) Vasily Vladykin**	**Toyota GR Supra GT4 Evo**	**+55 Laps**	**548**
27	**GT4**	**496**	**(United Arab Emirates) Continental Racing**	**Mikhail Loboda; David Pogosyan (Kyrgyzstan) Andrey Solukovtsev (Cyprus) Vasily Vladykin**	**BMW B58B30 3.0 L Twin-Turbo I6**	**+55 Laps**	**548**
28	**TCR**	**138**	**(United Kingdom) Simpson Motorsport**	**(United Arab Emirates) Ahmed Al Khaja (United Kingdom) Kavi Jundu; Andrei Muraveika (Kyrgyzstan) Ivan Stanchin (United Arab Emirates) Nadir Zuhour**	**Audi RS 3 LMS TCR (2017)**	**+71 Laps**	**532**
28	**TCR**	**138**	**(United Kingdom) Simpson Motorsport**	**(United Arab Emirates) Ahmed Al Khaja (United Kingdom) Kavi Jundu; Andrei Muraveika (Kyrgyzstan) Ivan Stanchin (United Arab Emirates) Nadir Zuhour**	**Volkswagen 2.0 L I4**	**+71 Laps**	**532**
29	**TCX**	**278**	**(United Kingdom) CWS Engineering**	**(Australia) Mark Griffith (United Kingdom) Owen Hizzey (United Kingdom) Tom Holland (United Kingdom) Daniel Morris (United Kingdom) Colin White**	**Ginetta G55 Supercup**	**+92 Laps**	**511**
29	**TCX**	**278**	**(United Kingdom) CWS Engineering**	**(Australia) Mark Griffith (United Kingdom) Owen Hizzey (United Kingdom) Tom Holland (United Kingdom) Daniel Morris (United Kingdom) Colin White**	**Ford Cyclone 3.7 L V6**	**+92 Laps**	**511**
30	GTX	701	(France) Vortex V8	(France) Lionel Amrouche (France) Philippe Bonnel (France) Arnaud Gomez (France) Olivier Gomez	Vortex 2.0	+98 Laps	505
30	GTX	701	(France) Vortex V8	(France) Lionel Amrouche (France) Philippe Bonnel (France) Arnaud Gomez (France) Olivier Gomez	Chevrolet LS3 6.2 L V8	+98 Laps	505
31 DNF	GT3-Pro	99	(Germany) Attempto Racing	(Germany) Alex Aka (Switzerland) Ricardo Feller; Andrey Mukovoz (Luxembourg) Dylan Pereira; Sergey Titarenko	Audi R8 LMS Evo II	+114 Laps	489
31 DNF	GT3-Pro	99	(Germany) Attempto Racing	(Germany) Alex Aka (Switzerland) Ricardo Feller; Andrey Mukovoz (Luxembourg) Dylan Pereira; Sergey Titarenko	Audi 5.2 L V10	+114 Laps	489
32 DNF	992-Am	908	(France) SebLajoux Racing by DUWO Racing	(France) Sebastien Lajoux (Belgium) Benjamin Paque (France) Stéphane Perrin (Netherlands) Flynt Schuring (France) Lucas Walter	Porsche 992 GT3 Cup	+119 Laps	484
32 DNF	992-Am	908	(France) SebLajoux Racing by DUWO Racing	(France) Sebastien Lajoux (Belgium) Benjamin Paque (France) Stéphane Perrin (Netherlands) Flynt Schuring (France) Lucas Walter	Porsche 4.0 L Flat-6	+119 Laps	484
33 DNF	GT3-Am	17	(Germany) MRS-GT Racing	(Saint Kitts and Nevis) Alexander Bukhantsov (Australia) John Corbett (United Kingdom) George King (United Kingdom) James Winslow	Porsche 911 GT3 R (991.2)	+120 Laps	483
33 DNF	GT3-Am	17	(Germany) MRS-GT Racing	(Saint Kitts and Nevis) Alexander Bukhantsov (Australia) John Corbett (United Kingdom) George King (United Kingdom) James Winslow	Porsche 4.0 L Flat-6	+120 Laps	483
34 DNF	TCX	227	(Germany) SRS Team Sorg Rennsport	(Switzerland) Gero Bauknecht (United States) José Garcia (Germany) Patrick Kolb (Germany) Christoph Krombach (Mexico) Benito Tagle	Porsche 718 Cayman GT4 Clubsport	+134 Laps	469
34 DNF	TCX	227	(Germany) SRS Team Sorg Rennsport	(Switzerland) Gero Bauknecht (United States) José Garcia (Germany) Patrick Kolb (Germany) Christoph Krombach (Mexico) Benito Tagle	Porsche 4.0 L Flat-6	+134 Laps	469
35 DNF	GT4	438	(United Kingdom) AGMC Racing Team by Simpson Motorsport	(United Kingdom) Hugo Cook (Belgium) Fabian Duffieux (Kyrgyzstan) Artur Dzhalilov (Kyrgyzstan) Ivan Krapivtsev (Australia) Cameron McLeod	BMW M4 GT4 Gen II	+142 Laps	461
35 DNF	GT4	438	(United Kingdom) AGMC Racing Team by Simpson Motorsport	(United Kingdom) Hugo Cook (Belgium) Fabian Duffieux (Kyrgyzstan) Artur Dzhalilov (Kyrgyzstan) Ivan Krapivtsev (Australia) Cameron McLeod	BMW N55 3.0 L Twin-Turbo I6	+142 Laps	461
36	992-Pro	921	(Belgium) Mühlner Motorsport	(United Arab Emirates) Keanu Al Azhari (Grenada) Vladislav Lomko (United States) Bryan Sircely (France) Gilles Vannelet	Porsche 992 GT3 Cup	+143 Laps	460
36	992-Pro	921	(Belgium) Mühlner Motorsport	(United Arab Emirates) Keanu Al Azhari (Grenada) Vladislav Lomko (United States) Bryan Sircely (France) Gilles Vannelet	Porsche 4.0 L Flat-6	+143 Laps	460
37	992-Pro	902	(Denmark) Holmgaard Motorsport	(Australia) Darren Currie (Australia) Axle Donaldson (Denmark) Jonas Holmgaard (Denmark) Magnus Holmgaard (Denmark) Patrick Steen Rasmussen	Porsche 992 GT3 Cup	+143 Laps	460
37	992-Pro	902	(Denmark) Holmgaard Motorsport	(Australia) Darren Currie (Australia) Axle Donaldson (Denmark) Jonas Holmgaard (Denmark) Magnus Holmgaard (Denmark) Patrick Steen Rasmussen	Porsche 4.0 L Flat-6	+143 Laps	460
38 DNF	GTX	714	(Austria) Razoon - More Than Racing	(Poland) Arthur Chwist (Austria) Daniel Drexel (South Africa) Mikaeel Pitamber (Kuwait) Haytham Qarajouli (United States) Kevin Woods	KTM X-Bow GT2 Concept	+152 Laps	451
38 DNF	GTX	714	(Austria) Razoon - More Than Racing	(Poland) Arthur Chwist (Austria) Daniel Drexel (South Africa) Mikaeel Pitamber (Kuwait) Haytham Qarajouli (United States) Kevin Woods	Audi 2.5 L I5	+152 Laps	451
39	992-Am	989	(Germany) MRS-GT Racing	(Kazakhstan) Alexandr Artemyev; Alexey Denisov; Nikolai Gadetskii (Estonia) Antti Rammo	Porsche 992 GT3 Cup	+154 Laps	449
39	992-Am	989	(Germany) MRS-GT Racing	(Kazakhstan) Alexandr Artemyev; Alexey Denisov; Nikolai Gadetskii (Estonia) Antti Rammo	Porsche 4.0 L Flat-6	+154 Laps	449
40	TCX	277	(United Kingdom) CWS Engineering	(Spain) Christian Broberg (Australia) Mark Griffith (United Kingdom) Tom Holland (United Kingdom) JM Littman (United Kingdom) Colin White	Ginetta G55 Supercup	+160 Laps	443
40	TCX	277	(United Kingdom) CWS Engineering	(Spain) Christian Broberg (Australia) Mark Griffith (United Kingdom) Tom Holland (United Kingdom) JM Littman (United Kingdom) Colin White	Ford Cyclone 3.7 L V6	+160 Laps	443
41	992-Am	936	(Germany) KKrämer Racing	(Germany) Christopher Brueck (Germany) Michele di Martino (Germany) Karsten Krämer (Germany) Fidel Leib; Denis Remenyako	Porsche 992 GT3 Cup	+171 Laps	432
41	992-Am	936	(Germany) KKrämer Racing	(Germany) Christopher Brueck (Germany) Michele di Martino (Germany) Karsten Krämer (Germany) Fidel Leib; Denis Remenyako	Porsche 4.0 L Flat-6	+171 Laps	432
42	TCX	226	(Italy) Lotus PB Racing	(Italy) Maurizio Copetti (Italy) Stefano d'Aste (Italy) Stefano Moretti (Monaco) Vito Utzieri	Lotus Elise Cup PB-R	+214 Laps	389
42	TCX	226	(Italy) Lotus PB Racing	(Italy) Maurizio Copetti (Italy) Stefano d'Aste (Italy) Stefano Moretti (Monaco) Vito Utzieri	Toyota 1.4 L I4	+214 Laps	389
43 DNF	992-Pro	988	(Austria) Neuhofer Rennsport by MRS GT-Racing	(Austria) Felix Neuhofer (Austria) Markus Neuhofer (Austria) Martin Ragginger (Austria) Helmut Roedig	Porsche 992 GT3 Cup	+218 Laps	385
43 DNF	992-Pro	988	(Austria) Neuhofer Rennsport by MRS GT-Racing	(Austria) Felix Neuhofer (Austria) Markus Neuhofer (Austria) Martin Ragginger (Austria) Helmut Roedig	Porsche 4.0 L Flat-6	+218 Laps	385
44 DNF	GT3-Pro	9	(Germany) GetSpeed Performance	(Oman) Al Faisal Al Zubair (United States) Anthony Bartone (Austria) Dominik Baumann (Austria) Martin Konrad (Germany) Fabian Schiller	Mercedes-AMG GT3 Evo	+244 Laps	359
44 DNF	GT3-Pro	9	(Germany) GetSpeed Performance	(Oman) Al Faisal Al Zubair (United States) Anthony Bartone (Austria) Dominik Baumann (Austria) Martin Konrad (Germany) Fabian Schiller	Mercedes-AMG M159 6.2 L V8	+244 Laps	359
45 DNF	TCR	188	(Belgium) AC Motorsport	(France) Thierry Chkondali (United Kingdom) James Kaye (Belgium) Kobe Pauwels (Netherlands) Paul Sieljes (Latvia) Ivars Vallers	Audi RS 3 LMS TCR (2021)	+332 Laps	271
45 DNF	TCR	188	(Belgium) AC Motorsport	(France) Thierry Chkondali (United Kingdom) James Kaye (Belgium) Kobe Pauwels (Netherlands) Paul Sieljes (Latvia) Ivars Vallers	Volkswagen EA888 2.0 L I4	+332 Laps	271
DNF	GT3-Am	48	(United Arab Emirates) S'Aalocin by Kox Racing	(Belgium) Tom Boonen (Netherlands) Peter Kox (Netherlands) Stéphane Kox (Netherlands) Nico Pronk (Netherlands) Dennis Retera	Porsche 911 GT3 R (991.2)	Retired	290
DNF	GT3-Am	48	(United Arab Emirates) S'Aalocin by Kox Racing	(Belgium) Tom Boonen (Netherlands) Peter Kox (Netherlands) Stéphane Kox (Netherlands) Nico Pronk (Netherlands) Dennis Retera	Porsche 4.0 L Flat-6	Retired	290
DNF	GT4	429	(United Kingdom) Century Motorsport	(United Kingdom) Nick Halstead (United Kingdom) David Holloway (United Kingdom) Piers Johnson (Australia) Rianna O’Meara-Hunt	BMW M4 GT4 Gen II	Crash	251
DNF	GT4	429	(United Kingdom) Century Motorsport	(United Kingdom) Nick Halstead (United Kingdom) David Holloway (United Kingdom) Piers Johnson (Australia) Rianna O’Meara-Hunt	BMW N55 3.0 L Twin-Turbo I6	Crash	251
DNF	GT3-Pro Am	6	(Germany) racing one	(Italy) Giacomo Altoè (Germany) Stefan Aust (Germany) Steffen Görig (Italy) Marco Pulcini (Netherlands) Thierry Vermeulen	Ferrari 296 GT3	Suspension	236
DNF	GT3-Pro Am	6	(Germany) racing one	(Italy) Giacomo Altoè (Germany) Stefan Aust (Germany) Steffen Görig (Italy) Marco Pulcini (Netherlands) Thierry Vermeulen	Ferrari F163 3.0 L Turbo V6	Suspension	236
DNF	GT3-Pro Am	76	(United Arab Emirates) OJ Lifestyle Racing by 7TSIX	(Austria) Philipp Baron (United Kingdom) Omar Jackson (Zimbabwe) Axcil Jefferies (Australia) George Nakas (Australia) Fraser Ross	McLaren 720S GT3 Evo	Gearbox	222
DNF	GT3-Pro Am	76	(United Arab Emirates) OJ Lifestyle Racing by 7TSIX	(Austria) Philipp Baron (United Kingdom) Omar Jackson (Zimbabwe) Axcil Jefferies (Australia) George Nakas (Australia) Fraser Ross	McLaren M840T 4.0 L Turbo V8	Gearbox	222
DNF	GT3-Pro Am	91	(Germany) Herberth Motorsport	(Switzerland) Daniel Allemann (Germany) Ralf Bohn (Germany) Alfred Renauer (Germany) Robert Renauer	Porsche 911 GT3 R (992)	Crash	192
DNF	GT3-Pro Am	91	(Germany) Herberth Motorsport	(Switzerland) Daniel Allemann (Germany) Ralf Bohn (Germany) Alfred Renauer (Germany) Robert Renauer	Porsche M97/80 4.2 L Flat-6	Crash	192
DNF	GT3-Pro	88	(United Kingdom) ROFGO with Dragon Racing	(Denmark) Benjamin Goethe (Denmark) Oliver Goethe (Germany) Roald Goethe (South Africa) Jordan Grogor (United Kingdom) Stuart Hall	Ferrari 296 GT3	Electrics	160
DNF	GT3-Pro	88	(United Kingdom) ROFGO with Dragon Racing	(Denmark) Benjamin Goethe (Denmark) Oliver Goethe (Germany) Roald Goethe (South Africa) Jordan Grogor (United Kingdom) Stuart Hall	Ferrari F163 3.0 L Turbo V6	Electrics	160
DNF	GT3-Pro	10	(Australia) EBM – Grove Racing	(Australia) Brenton Grove (Australia) Stephen Grove (United Kingdom) Phil Keen (Australia) Jordan Love (New Zealand) Matthew Payne	Mercedes-AMG GT3 Evo	Retired	117
DNF	GT3-Pro	10	(Australia) EBM – Grove Racing	(Australia) Brenton Grove (Australia) Stephen Grove (United Kingdom) Phil Keen (Australia) Jordan Love (New Zealand) Matthew Payne	Mercedes-AMG M159 6.2 L V8	Retired	117
DNF	GT3-Pro Am	18	(France) Saintéloc Junior Team	(Austria) Michael Doppelmayr (Germany) Elia Erhart (Germany) Sven Herberger (Germany) Pierre Kaffer	Audi R8 LMS Evo II	Power steering	77
DNF	GT3-Pro Am	18	(France) Saintéloc Junior Team	(Austria) Michael Doppelmayr (Germany) Elia Erhart (Germany) Sven Herberger (Germany) Pierre Kaffer	Audi 5.2 L V10	Power steering	77
DNF	992-Am	927	(Germany) SRS Team Sorg Rennsport	(Germany) Stefan Beyer (Switzerland) Patrik Grütter (Ukraine) Oleksiy Kikireshko (Germany) Marlon Menden	Porsche 992 GT3 Cup	Crash	39
DNF	992-Am	927	(Germany) SRS Team Sorg Rennsport	(Germany) Stefan Beyer (Switzerland) Patrik Grütter (Ukraine) Oleksiy Kikireshko (Germany) Marlon Menden	Porsche 4.0 L Flat-6	Crash	39
DNS	GT3-Pro Am	63	(Germany) Leipert Motorsport	(New Zealand) Brendon Leitch (Italy) Marco Mapelli (Luxembourg) Gabriele Rindone (France) Alban Varutti	Lamborghini Huracán GT3 Evo 2	Fuel tank	0
DNS	GT3-Pro Am	63	(Germany) Leipert Motorsport	(New Zealand) Brendon Leitch (Italy) Marco Mapelli (Luxembourg) Gabriele Rindone (France) Alban Varutti	Lamborghini DGF 5.2 L V10	Fuel tank	0

== Notes ==
Middle East Trophy
Previous race: 6 Hours of Abu Dhabi	2023–24 season	Next race: none
