= Technos =

Technos may refer to:

- Technos (watches), a watch brand established 1900 in Switzerland
- Technōs Japan, a defunct Japanese video game developer, 1981–1996
- Techno Twins or The Technos, a 1980s British electronic music duo
