= Gunzinger =

Gunzinger is a surname. Notable people with the surname include:

- Anton Gunzinger (born 1956), Swiss electrical engineer and entrepreneur
- Joseph Gunzinger (1892–1970), Swiss watchmaker
