= Hans Wehrmann =

German entrepreneur, economist, inventor and author

Hans Wehrmann (born 9 May 1964 in Hanover) is a German businessman, inventor, and author of literature in scientific management.

== Early life ==
Wehrmann started his career during his schooldays as an independent entrepreneur by dealing in used refrigerators, stoves, and washing machines. He studied economy in German and French at Fribourg University in Switzerland, achieving a Dr. rer. pol. Additionally, he held a Master of Business Administration (MBA) of the university INSEAD in Fontainebleau, France. He covered the costs for his studies in Switzerland and for the MBA program by founding a publishing house as well as organizing management and recruiting seminars.

== Business career ==
Wehrmann worked for Boston Consulting Group in Germany, afterwards founding the Certina Holding AG and growing it into an international conglomerate.

Furthermore, Wehrmann is board member of L'Osteria.

== Scientific career ==
As a scientist, Wehrmann works on the integration of systems and evolutionary theory into economic science and the dynamics of organizational development and strategic alliances.

Furthermore, Wehrmann developed multilayer papers containing wastepaper and grass fibers and holds the respective patents in the US and Europe together with German paper-mill Papierfabrik Meldorf

== Racing career ==
As a racing driver, Wehrmann is participating in different racing series. Among others, he won the SP7-Class of the ADAC Nürburgring 24 Hours subsequently in 2020 and 2021. In 2022, Wehrmann had his Nürburgring Nordschleife permit revoked in response to a speeding offense during the Nürburgring 24 Hours.

== Personal life ==
Wehrmann is married to Vanessa Wehrmann and divorced from German actress Giulia Siegel.

== Academic works (selected) ==
- System- und Evolutionstheoretische Betrachtungen der Organisationsentwicklung, 1995, Frankfurt am Main
- Management im Wandel. Freiburger Gespräche 1987/1988, hrsg. von Norbert Thom, Hamburg u. a. 1989
