= Pizza Pilgrims =

British restaurant chain

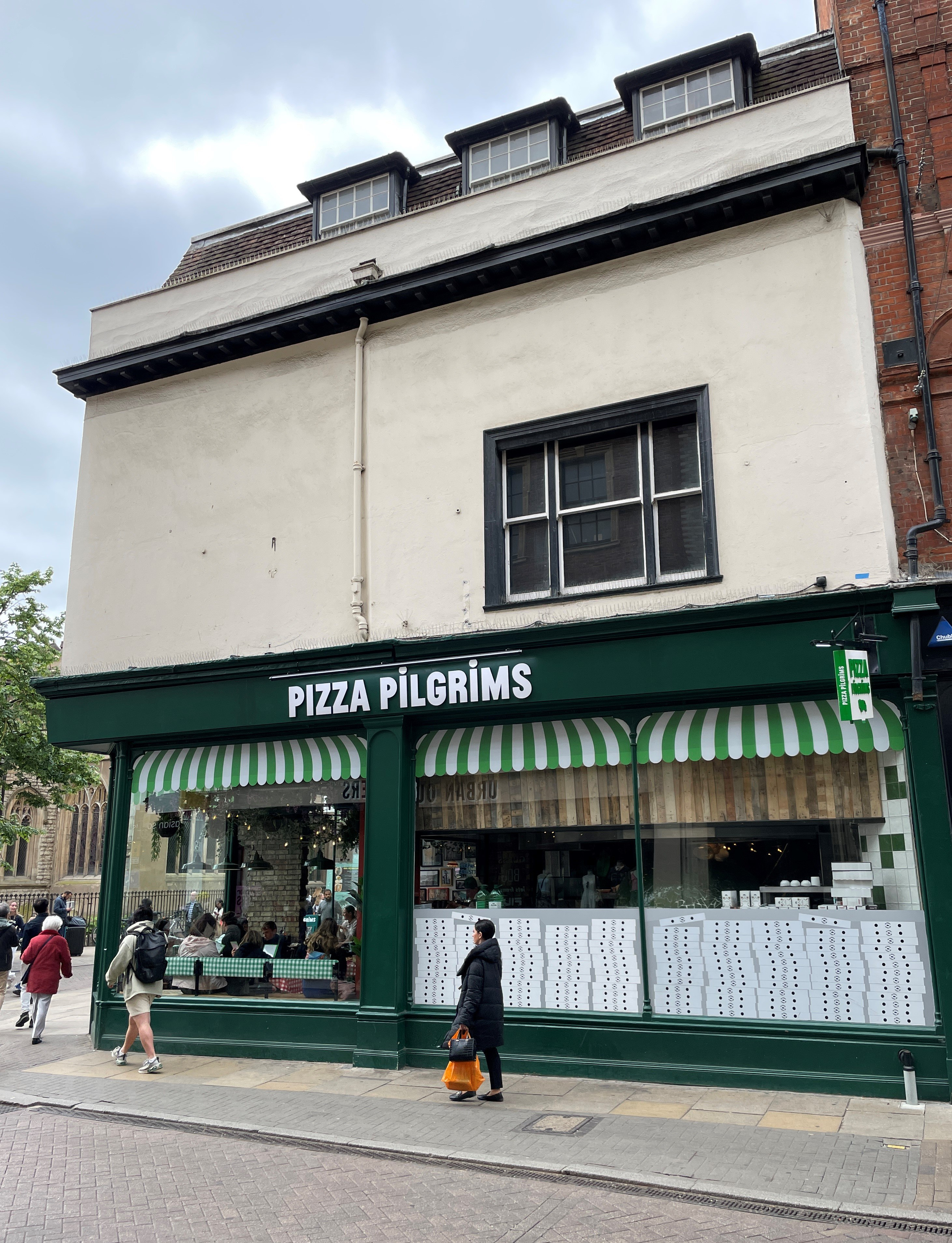
Pizza Pilgrims, Cambridge, 2023

Pizza Pilgrims is a British pizza restaurant chain.

Pizza Pilgrims was founded in 2012 by brothers Thom and James Elliot, and as of 2025, operates 26 restaurants in the UK.

In August 2025, the German pizza chain L'Osteria acquired a majority stake.
