= Era Watch Company =

Swiss manufacturer of luxury watches

Montres Edox et Vista SA
- Type: Private
- Industry: Watches, clocks, watch cases and parts
- Founded: 1884
- Founder: Christian Ruefli-Flury
- Headquarters: Les Genevez (JU), Switzerland
- Key people: Christian Hotz (CEO)
- Products: luxury wristwatches, accessories
- Revenue: U.S. $10.64 million (2014)
- Parent: Edox Watch Company

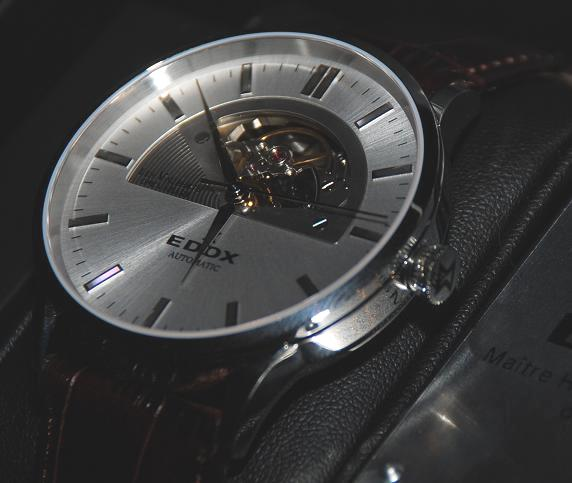
Edox Les Vauberts Open Heart

Montres Edox et Vista SA (EDOX) is a Swiss manufacture of luxury wristwatches that operates under the Era Watch Company. Christian Ruefli-Flury, a watchmaker originating from Grenchen, Switzerland, founded the company in 1884 in Biel/Bienne. Edox has remained in continuous production since their foundation.

== History ==
Ruefli-Flury used the ancient Greek word Edox as a trademark, and designed the "1900" hourglass to serve as a visual symbol for the company's brand. Robert Kaufman-Hug took over the company when Ruefli-Flury died in 1921. He led the company's transition from pocket watches to become the first wristwatch-exclusive watchmaker.

By 1955, the company employed 500 people and moved to a new factory. The Delfin line of watches launched in 1961, with industry-first double casebacks for high standards of shock protection, water resistance, and ruggedness. The Hydrosub line was launched in 1963, featuring the first crown system with tension ring, allowing waterproofness of 500 meters. In 1965, Victor Flury-Liechti took over the company from his uncle, and invested in new manufacturing technologies. This led to the 1970 Geoscope timepiece, the first watch covering all time zones. In 1973, the third-generation Delfin was released. It used elements from to the Gerald Genta-designed Audemars Piguet Royal Oak.

With the rise of Japaneses watches and the Quartz crisis in the 1970s, the company became an affiliate of the General Watch Company, a sub-holding company of ASUAG. As part of the move, Technos and Certina were transferred to the Biel/Bienne Edox location. At the end of the downturn in the Swiss watch industry in 1983, Edox regained independence when the company was sold to Victor Strambini Montres Vista SA and moved to Les Genevez, Jura Mountains. It has since remained a family-owned company. The Edox Les Bémonts Ultra Slim was released in 1998. With a movement thickness of 1.4 mm, it still holds the record for the slimmest calendar watch.

The Delfin line was restarted in 2013 with a new model based on the 1973 edition. In 2014, the company celebrated their 130th anniversary by releasing updated, limited-edition versions of their Geoscope, Les Bémonts, and Hydrosub timepieces.

== Sponsorship and clientele ==
The company sponsors the Extreme Sailing Series, Dakar Rally (now held in South America) and is sponsor and official timekeeper of the World Rally Championship. The manufacture also produces diving watches for UIM Class 1.

Notable wearers of Edox watches include Olympic swimmer Mireia Belmonte, race car drivers Benito Guerra, Scott Mclaughlin, and Petter Solberg, as well as U.S. actors Andrew Garfield and Bruce Willis.

== Distribution and price ==
The company produces 70,000 to 90,000 watches annually, each retailing at an average price of $1,600 to $2,200 USD.
