= Norbert Thom =

German-Swiss economist

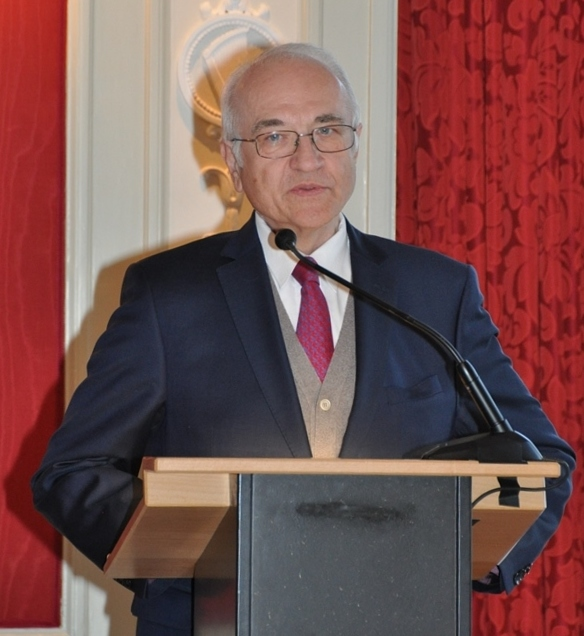

Norbert Thom (born 11 August 1946 in Kleinsteinlohe, Tiefenbach, Bavaria; residing in Köniz, Switzerland; Swiss citizen since 2011) is a German-Swiss economist and emeritus professor at the University of Bern where he taught business administration, organization design and human resource management until he retired in summer 2012.

== Education ==
Thom studied business administration and the minor subjects macro-economics and sociology at the University of Cologne. receiving his doctoral degree (Dr.rer.pol) in 1976 for his dissertation: ‘On the efficiency of innovation processes’. He was a member of the graduate seminar of the European Institute for Advanced Studies in Management (EIASM) in Brussels. At the same time he was an assistant to Erwin Grochla. In 1984 he obtained postdoctoral teaching qualifications and taught business administration at the University of Cologne.

== Faculty positions ==
In 1984, Thom became Deputy to the Chair of Organization and Human Resource Management at Justus-Liebig University/Giessen. Then he received in 1985 his appointment to the professorial Chair of Management, Organization and Human Resources at the University of Fribourg, and was Founder and head of its Corporate Management and Organization Seminar.

Thom moved in 1991 to the University of Bern where he founded the Institute for Organization and Human Resource Management (IOP) and remained its director until 2012. In the academic year 2000/2001 he was appointed acting director the university's Institute for International Innovation Management. In 2002 he co-founded its interfacultary Competence Center for Public Management.

He has served as Vice-chancellor of the University of Bern; responsible for finance and planning (1995–1997). He has also held visiting professor positions at the universities of Basel, Bern, Linz, Dresden, Fribourg, Vilnius (Lithuania), Cluj-Napoca (Romania), Alcalá de Henares (Spain) and Regensburg.

== Positions ==
- First President of the Swiss Society of Business Economics (Schweizerische Gesellschaft für Betriebswirtschaft) (1990–93).
- Member of the Swiss Science Council – an advisory board to the Federal Government on issues related to science policy (1997–2000).
- Vice-president of the Economic Society of the Canton of Bern (2002–2014)
- Vice-president of the Foundation of the Swiss Association for Organization and Management (2000–2013).
- Vice-president of the Swiss Association for Organization and Management (1991–2007).
- Chief editor of the magazine ''Zeitschrift Führung + Organization'' (zfo), a journal on management and organization (1986–1995). Member of zfo advisory publishing committee (1996–2005).
- Founder and president of Stiftung Norbert Thom, founded 17 October 2016, a foundation endowing prizes for academic achievements (doctoral achievements) in the field of ‘Public and Private Management’ at Swiss universities.

== Honors and awards ==
- 1988 – Honorary Medal of the University of Linz, Austria.
- 1992 – Denker-Award for contributions on innovation management and business suggestion systems (First individual winner in Switzerland).
- 2002 – Honorary member of the German ‘Gesellschaft für Organisation’ (GfO). Only actively working honorary member.
- 2003 – Honorary member of the Swiss Society of Business Economics (Only member actively working as professor of business administration).
- 2005 – Doctor honoris causa (Dr. hc), Faculty of Law, Mykolas Romeris University of Vilnius, Lithuania.
- 2006 – Doctor honoris causa (Dr. hc), Johannes-Kepler-University, Linz, Austria.
- 2006 – Doctor honoris causa (Dr. hc), Martin-Luther-University, Halle-Wittenberg, Germany.
- 2007 – Honorary member of ‘Gesellschaft für Organisation und Management’ (SGO), Swiss Association for Organization and Management.
- 2010 – Professor honoris causa (Prof. hc), Babeş-Bolyai University, Cluj Napoka, Romania.
- 2011 – Honorary Member of IDEE- SUISSE - ‘Schweizerische Gesellschaft für Ideen- und Innovationsmanagement’ (Swiss Society for Ideas and Innovation Management).
- 2013 – Senior Fellow at the Center of Competence for Public Management at the University of Bern
- 2014 – Honorary member of the ‘Volkswirtschaftliche Gesellschaft’ (National Economic Association) of the Canton of Bern.
- Honorary award for lifetime achievement by ‘Deutsches Institut für Ideen- und Innovationsmanagement’, Frankfurt am Main (2017)
- Honorary member of: Ehrenmitglied von Quer.kraft – an innovation association in the region of Nürnberg (2019)

== Selected publications ==
Thom has published more than 30 books as author or editor, mostly in the field of corporate innovation management, planning of programs for fostering young talents, transformation management in private and public enterprises and public management at all government levels.

His publications have been translated into 27 different languages. Some are:

- Norbert Thom, Frauke von Bieberstein, Andreas Hack (Publisher): ‘People in organizations’ (Menschen in Organisationen), IOP publishing house, Bern 2016, ISBN 978-3-905766-54-7
- Norbert Thom, Wenger P. Andreas: ‘The optimal organizational form: basics and recommendations for action’ (Die optimal Organisationsform. Grundlagen und Handlungsempfehlungen), Gabler 2010, ISBN 978-3-8349-2015-7
- Adrian Ritz, Norbert Thom (Editor): ‚Talent Management‘, Gabler 2018 (3nd edition), ISBN 978-3-8349-1811-6
- Norbert Thom, Joanna Harasymowicz-Birnbach: ‘Knowledge management in the private and public sector. What both sectors can learn from each other?’, (Wissensmanagement im privaten und öffentlichen Sektor. Was können beide Sektoren voneinander lernen?), Vdf University Publishing 2005 (2ndedition), ISBN 3-728-12983-6
- Norbert Thom, Adrian Ritz, Reto Steiner (Editor): ‘Effective school management: opportunities and risks of public management in education’, (Effektive Schulführung: Chancen und Gefahren des Public Managements im Bildungswesen), 2006 (2nd edition), ISBN 3-258-06878-X
- Norbert Thom, Adrian Ritz: Public Management: ‘Innovative concepts for leadership in the public sector’, (Innovative Konzepte zur Führung im öffentlichen Sektor), Gabler 2017 (5th edition), ISBN 3-834-90730-8
- Norbert Thom, Robert J. Zaugg (Editor): ‘Modern personnel development: Recognizing, developing and promoting employee potential’, (Moderne Personalentwicklung: Mitarbeiterpotenziale erkennen, entwickeln und fördern), Gabler 2008 (3rd edition), ISBN 3-834-91060-0
- Norbert Thom, Andreas P. Wenger, Robert J. Zaugg (Editor): ‘Organization and Staff Cases: Didactics - Case Studies - Solutions - Theory Building Blocks’, (Fälle zu Organisation und Personal: Didaktik - Fallstudien - Lösungen - Theoriebausteine), 2007 (5th edition), ISBN 3-258-07225-6
- Norbert Thom, Adrian Ritz: ‘Public Management. Innovative concepts in the public sector’, (Management Public. Concepts innovants dans le secteur public), French polytechnic and university presses, 2013, ISBN 978-2-88074-995-8
