= L'Osteria =

German restaurant chain

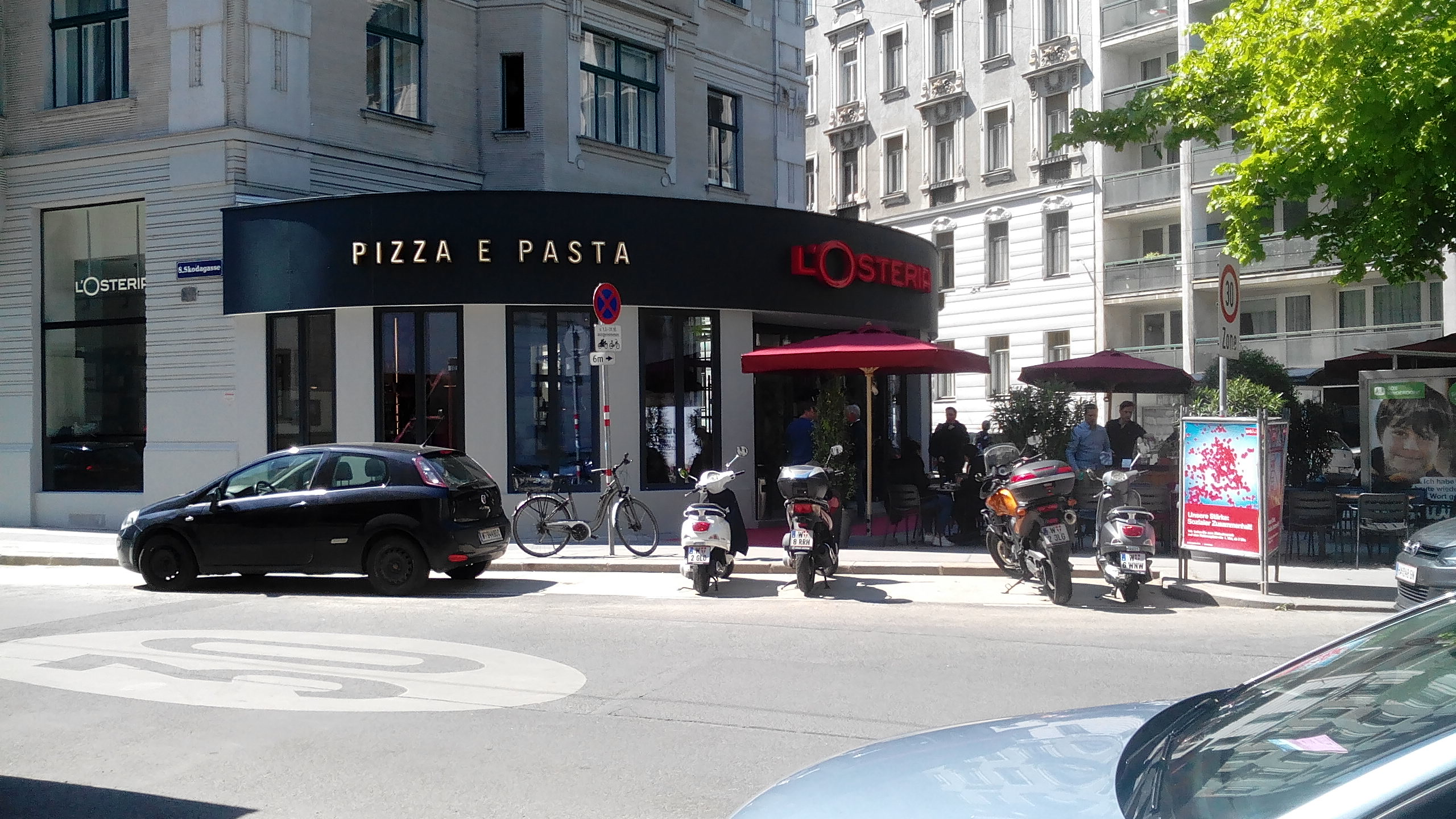
L'Osteria in Vienna, Austria, 2016

L'Osteria is a German pizza restaurant chain.

L'Osteria was founded in 1999 in Nuremberg, Germany and is known for its 45cm pizzas.

As of August 2025, it operates over 200 restaurants across ten countries in Europe, and is backed by the investment fund McWin.

In August 2025, L'Osteria acquired a majority stake in the UK chain Pizza Pilgrims.
