= Certina Holding =

Certina Holding AG
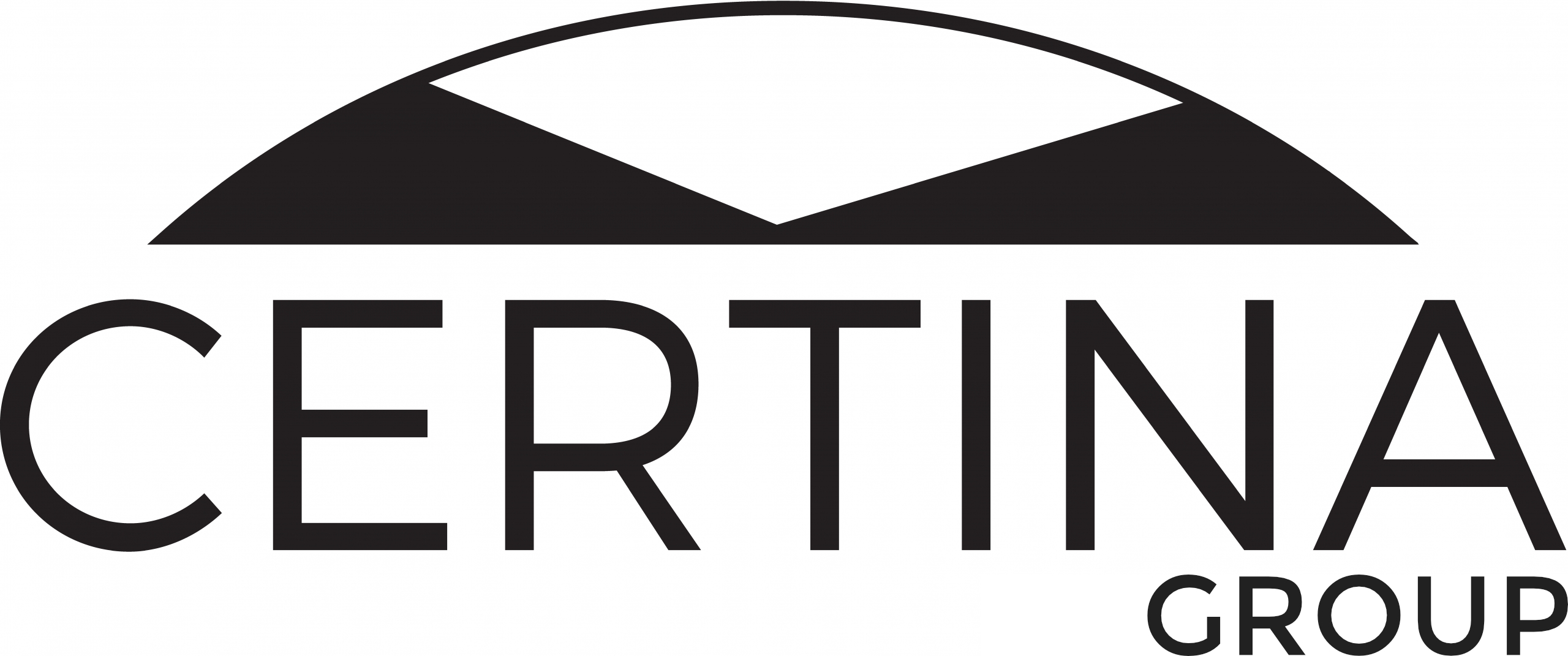
- Company type: Aktiengesellschaft (German Aktiengesellschaft)
- Industry: Conglomerate
- Founded: 1997
- Founder: Hans Wehrmann
- Headquarters: Grünwald/Munich, Bavaria, Germany
- Area served: Worldwide
- Key people: Dr. Hans Wehrmann (CEO), Heide Wehrmann (Chairwomen), Dr. Stefan Brungs (Head Automotive Holdings), Marcel Lampey (Head Legal Affairs), Holger Schmidt (Head Service Holdings), Wolfgang Wondra (Head Packaging Holdings), András von Kontz (Head Corporate Development), Giovanni Santamaria (Head IT Holdings),
- Website: www.certina.de

Certina Holding AG is a holding company for niche manufacturers, specialised construction and IT companies with its headquarters in Grünwald near Munich in Germany, growing organically and through acquisitions.

The name "Certina" is taken from the Latin "certus", meaning "assured", "certain".

Certina was founded by the Wehrmann family. The Familie is listed in the Who is Who of German entrepreneurs as one of the 1.000 most important families. In the list of German family business Certina is ranked 684.

== Acquisition history ==
- 1997: Waldemar Pruss Armaturen GmbH, Hanover;
- 1999: Hannemann GmbH; Düsseldorf;
- 2000: Kreuzstromwerk, Hagen (2002 Integration of these 3 companies into Pruss Armaturen AG);
- 2000: Hornglass AG, Plössberg
- 2003: Moralt Tischlerplatten, Bad Tölz from Pfleiderer;
- 2004: COI Consulting für Office und Information Management GmbH, Herzogenaurach from Schaeffler Group;
- 2005: Thyssen-Krupp Stahlbau GmbH, Hanover from ThyssenKrupp; sold in 2007 to Eiffel/Eiffage;
- 2006: Maqsima GmbH, Saarland, Joint Venture together with TÜV Saarland;
- 2007: AFT-Group, Schopfheim from Kardex AG, Zürich;
- 2007: CAM Systems GmbH from French software conglomerate CS Systemes in Le Plessis Robinson;
- 2010: Vitaviva Srl. (Italy) from German wellness conglomerate Villeroy & Boch;
- 2010: Domino S.r.l. (Italy) from finish wellness concern Sanitec Group including the brands "Albatros" und "Revita";
- 2012: Rebhan FPS Kunststoff-Verpackungen GmbH in Stockheim, Germany from Bayern LB Capital Partners. 2012 erfolgt ebenso die Übernahme von SCV S.r.l..
- 2015: Qualiform France from French Groupe Pochet (Pochet du Courval).
- 2017: Papierfabrik Meldorf from Panther Packaging. mit Sitz in Bergen.
- 2017: Hermann Koch, Germany.
- 2018: Demm S.r.l., Bologna, Italy.
- 2019: Pibiviesse S.r.l., Milano, Italy from CIRCOR International Inc.
- 2019: Wegener + Stapel, Germany.
- 2020: Pricol Wiping Systems (today PAL Wiping Systems Czech s.r.o) from Pricol India um.
- 2020: Trassl Polymer Solutions Germany.
- 2021: United Salon Technologies Germany from German Wilh. Wehrhahn KG.
- 2021: Sodexo SCS GmbH in a carve-out-Prozess of the educational catering branch of French Sodexo Group.
