= Joseph Gunzinger =

Swiss watchmaker

Josef Gunzinger (March 23, 1892, in Welschenrohr, Solothurn, Switzerland – May 1, 1970, in Heiligenschwendi) was a Swiss watchmaker. In 1962, he was made "citizen of honor" of the town where he was born.

Son of Melchior Gunzinger, watchmaker, and Elizabeth Allemann. Married in 1920 to Rosalia Allemann, a household skills teacher.

Upon his apprenticeship as a watchmaker in his father’s workshop, he went to La Chaux-de-Fonds for a one-year furthering of his skills.

== Business ==
1920 he took over the family business and changed the name of the company into Gunzinger Brothers SA. As from 1924, the company started manufacturing watches under the TM Technos that he had previously officially registered.

At its peak in 1970, Technos employed 450 people and exported around the world, particularly in Brazil and Japan. It was by far the biggest employer of the whole valley.

He sold the whole company to General Watch Company in 1971, a sub-holding of ASUAG.

== Accomplishments ==
Josef Gunzinger was a co-founder of the Federation of the Swiss German watch manufacturers in 1924.

He was Welschenrohr Community Councilor (Executive) between 1917 and 1931, and a member of the Canton of Solothurn Grand Council (1921-1925).

He proved to be an entrepreneur doted of a patriarchal fiber with a social touch, although as a politician he was definitely right wing.

Josef Gunzinger is one of the leading figures of the twentieth-century flourishing watch industry, whose exemplary-worth values went far beyond Welschenrohr, where he had been for so long the "king of the village".

== Sources ==
- U. Fink, ed. Fleissig Hände. Uhrenindustrie in Welschenrohr und im Thal (1880-1980), 2000 -C. Schmid, U. Fink, "Aufstieg und Niedergang der Uhrenindustrie in Welschenrohr" in JbSolG, 73, 2000, 117-177
- http://www.hls-dhs-dss.ch/textes/f/F30385.php DICTIONNAIRE HISTORIQUE DE LA SUISSE, Author (s): Urban Fink / AN
