= Technos (watches) =

Watch brand in Switzerland

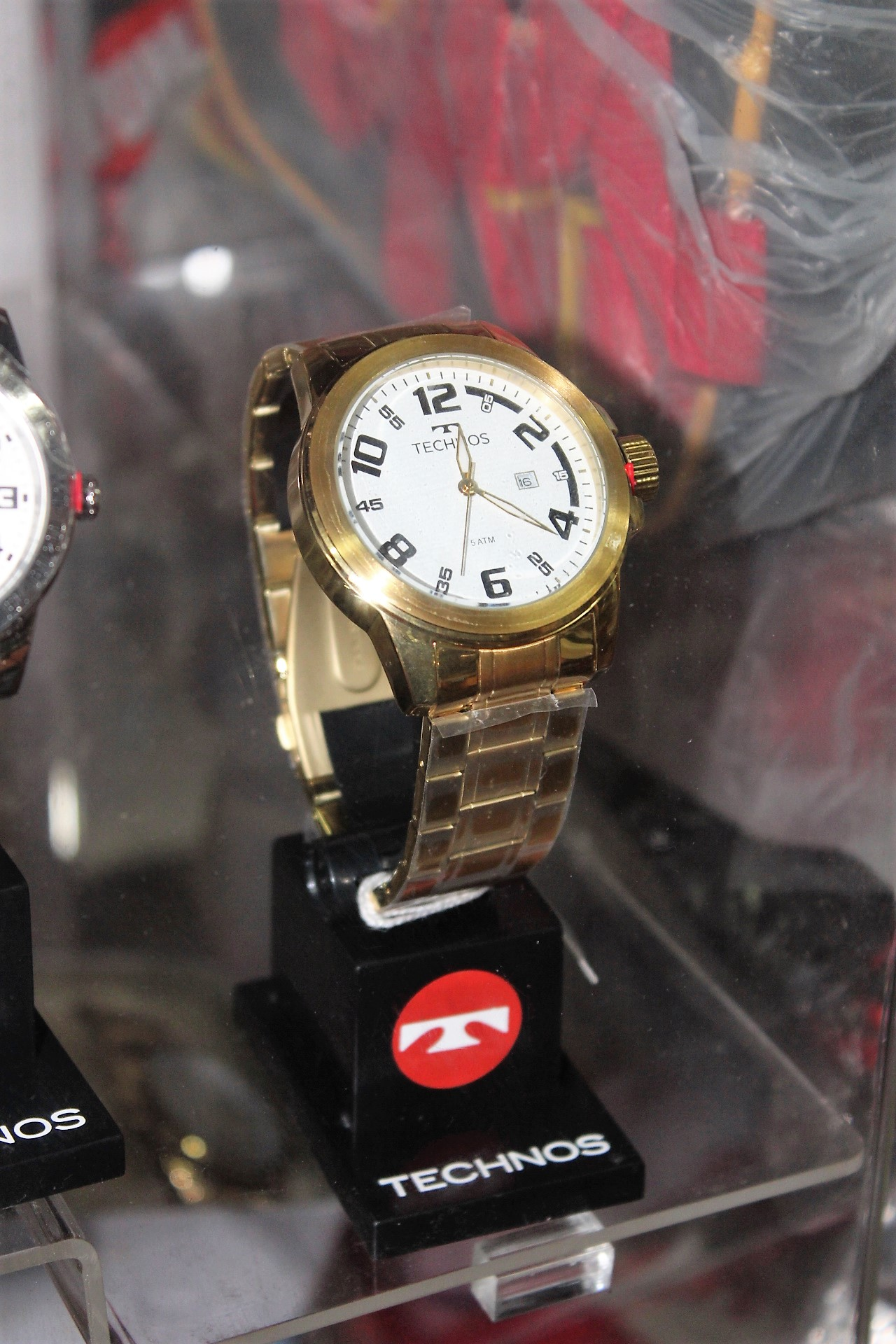
A current Technos watch model on display in a watch store.

Technos is a watch trademark. It was first registered in 1924 in Switzerland, and gained popularity after World War II, especially in Japan and Brazil. The brand is now Brazilian-owned.

== History ==
=== M. Gunzinger-Hug Co. ===
The company was founded 1900 under the name M. Gunzinger-Hug. It was founded by Melchior Gunzinger, in Welschenrohr, in the Swiss Jura Mountains, Canton of Solothurn, Switzerland.

=== Gunzinger Bros Ltd ===
Melchior’s son, Joseph Gunzinger, took over the watch manufacturing facility in 1920 and changed the name to "Gunzinger Bros Ltd."

In 1924 he registered the trademark "Technos" and started manufacturing and exporting watches under that name. Technos became a successful brand and the company began to increase its manufacturing capacity. It became one of the main employers in the area.

In 1970, Josef Gunzinger sold the company to General Watch Co. At the time the company employed 450 people and exported watches worldwide, especially to Japan & Brazil. Soon however, with the introduction of Japanese watches Technos started losing market share, and by 1976, only the Japanese market was still managing to provide some orders.

In 1977 the company was transferred to Biel/Bienne in Montres Edox SA premises. Both companies were reorganized under a new joint management, to fight for survival, and in 1980 Certina was also integrated in the ad hoc structure.

=== Heiwado & Co ===
In 1982 the company was sold, with all rights to the "Technos" trademark, to its long-time Japanese importer Heiwado & Co, Tokyo, Japan (see ja:テクノス). Its new owners granted a limited licence to use the trademark Technos to the importing company in Brazil, allowing them to design and manufacture their own Technos branded watches.

In 1995, the company sold the rights to the Technos brand throughout South America and the Caribbean to Technos Relógios S.A., followed in 2002 by the sale of the remaining worldwide rights.

=== Technos Relógios S.A. ===
In Brazil, the history of Technos began in 1956, when Centauro Importadora, from Rio Grande do Sul, started to represent Technos watches. Now called Technos Relógios S/.A., with its parent company, Technos da Amazônia Indústria e Comércio Ltda, both 100% Brazilian companies, they produce about a million watches a year in their own manufacturing facilities in Manaus.

Now based on Citizen movements, Technos watches are no longer Swiss Made. Technos has become a popular brand in Brazil, with a 35% of market share.

=== Technos da Amazonia Swiss SARL ===
Through the sister company Technos da Amazonia Swiss SARL in Neuchâtel, Switzerland, Technos Brazil now holds the rights to the trademark “Technos” worldwide.

== Bibliography ==
- Technos. 50 Jahre Gebrüder Gunzinger A. G., W. 1900—1950. Sol. 1950
- Welschenrohr.f Ein Stück Wirtschaftsgeschichte aus dem Kanton Solothurn. (Technos W.) Sol. Ztg. 1950, Nr. 220, v. 22. Sept.
- Fleissige Hände, Uhrenindustrie in Welschenrohr und im Thal" (1880–1980), by Urban Fink, 2000, Gemeindekanzlei Welschenrohr, Switzerland
- Jahrbuch für Solothurnische Geschichte 73. Band, 2000, pages 117-177, "Aufstieg und Niedergang der Uhrenindustrie in Welschenrohr", by Christof Schmid, revised by Urban Fink - Vogt-Schild/Habegger Medien AG, Switzerland
