= Felipe Fernández Laser =

German racing driver (born 1988)

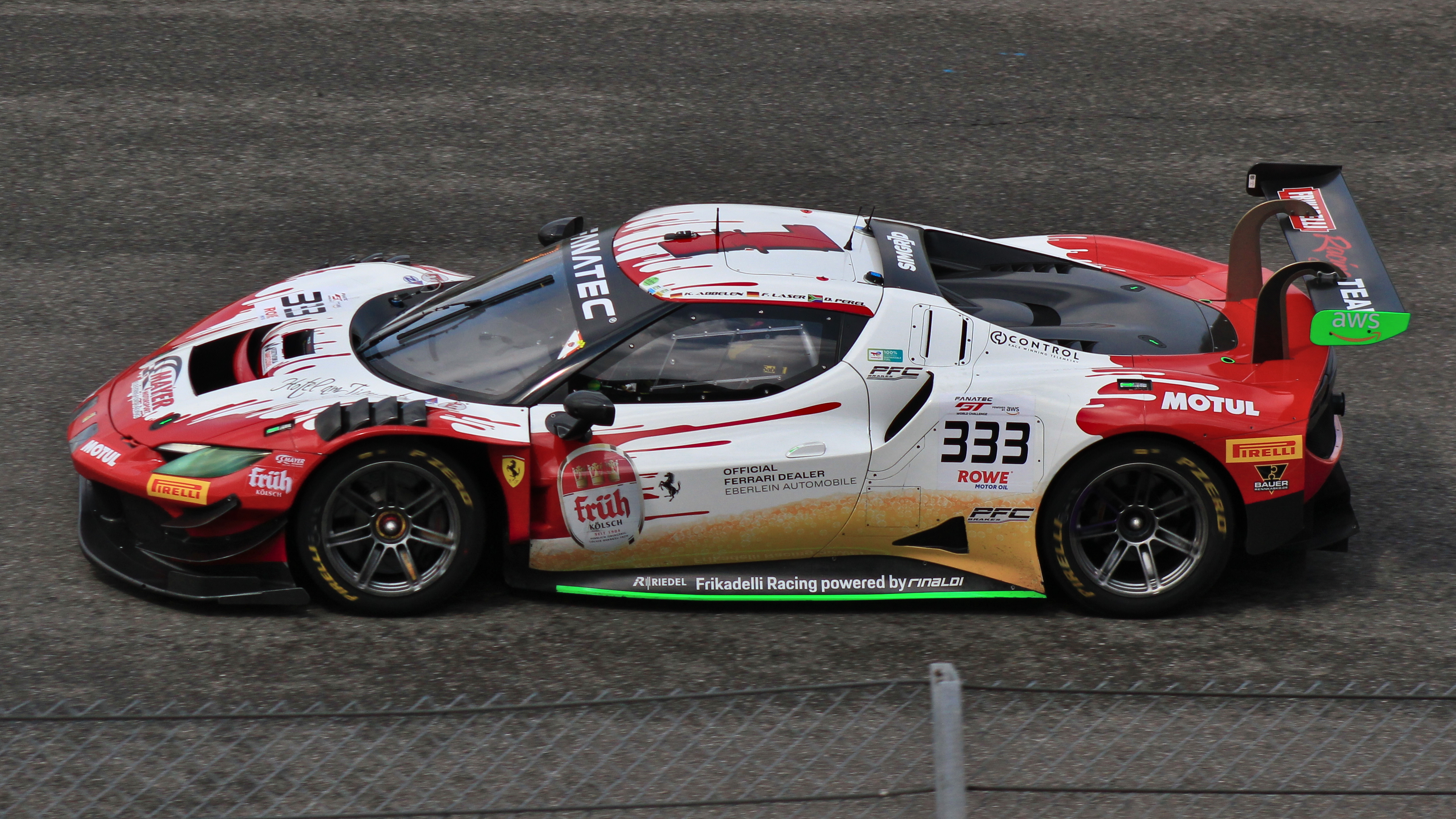
- Nationality: (Germany) German
- Born: 16 November 1988 (age 37) Uelzen, West Germany

Le Mans Cup career
- Debut season: 2022
- Current team: Rinaldi Racing
- Categorisation: FIA Silver (until 2021, 2026–); FIA Gold (2022–2025)
- Car number: 71
- Former teams: Frikadelli Racing Team
- Starts: 29
- Wins: 1
- Podiums: 6
- Poles: 0
- Fastest laps: 1
- Best finish: 4th (LMP3 Pro-Am) in 2025

Championship titles
- 2023: Nürburgring 24 Hours

Felipe Fernández Laser (German pronunciation: [feˈliːpe fɛʁˈnandɛs ˈlaːzɐ], born 16 November 1988) is a German racing driver.

== Career ==
Fernández Laser began his racing career in 2007 in the ADAC Volkswagen Polo Cup and ended it with three wins in the rookie classification. A year later, he entered the SEAT León Supercopa. Between 2012 and 2013, he took part in a total of six races in the Porsche Carrera Cup Germany, with the best result being fourth place at the Red Bull Ring.

In 2014, Fernández Laser started more and more races in the VLN Endurance Championship on the Nürburgring-Nordschleife, initially in a 450 hp Porsche 911 GT3 Cup. In 2015, he entered the Nürburgring 24 Hours for the first time and finished sixth overall with his teammates Michela Cerruti, John Edwards and Daniel Keilwitz. In the further course of the year, Fernández Laser drove two overall victories in the VLN Endurance Championship Nürburgring, in the Dunlop BMW Z4 GT3 Art Car designed by JP Performance. In 2016, he was brought in by James Glickenhaus, to drive for Scuderia Cameron Glickenhaus. He finished in second place in the SP-X class together with Manuel Lauck, Franck Mailleux and Jeroen Bleekemolen. In 2019, he finished in eighth overall and had the fastest race lap in the class, and in 2020, he finished 14th overall and won the SP-X class for Glickenhaus. In addition, Fernández Laser and Lance David Arnold won the 3rd round of the VLN Endurance Championship Nürburgring in 2018 for the Frikadelli Racing Team, a team owned by Sabine Schmitz and Klaus Abbelen.

In the 2020 season, Fernández Laser entered the European Le Mans Series on a Porsche 911 RSR. In 2022, as part of Frikadelli, he joined the Le Mans Cup alongside Abbelen. Fernández Laser formed a part of the Frikadelli entry that won the 2023 24 Hours of Nürburgring, driving alongside Earl Bamber, Nicky Catsburg, and David Pittard.

== Racing record ==
=== Complete 24 Hours of Nürburgring results ===
Year	Team	Co-Drivers	Car	Class	Laps	Ovr. Pos.	Class Pos.
2015	(Germany) Walkenhorst Motorsport	(Italy) Michela Cerruti (United States) John Edwards (Germany) Daniel Keilwitz	BMW Z4 GT3	SP9 GT3	153	6th	6th
2016	(United States) Scuderia Cameron Glickenhaus	(Netherlands) Jeroen Bleekemolen (France) Franck Mailleux (Germany) Manuel Lauck	Scuderia Cameron Glickenhaus SCG 003c	SP-X	98	DNF	DNF
2016	(United States) Scuderia Cameron Glickenhaus	(Germany) Thomas Mutsch (Sweden) Andreas Simonsen (United States) Jeff Westphal	Scuderia Cameron Glickenhaus SCG 003c	SP-X	119	26th	**2nd**
2017	(Switzerland) Traum Motorsport	(France) Franck Mailleux (Germany) Thomas Mutsch (Italy) Andrea Piccini	Scuderia Cameron Glickenhaus SCG 003c	SP-X	148	19th	**1st**
2017	(Switzerland) Traum Motorsport	(France) Franck Mailleux (Sweden) Andreas Simonsen (United States) Jeff Westphal	Scuderia Cameron Glickenhaus SCG 003c	SP-X	127	DNF	DNF
2018	(Germany) Frikadelli Racing Team	(France) Mathieu Jaminet (Germany) Marco Seefried (Austria) Norbert Siedler	Porsche 911 GT3 R	SP9 GT3	69	DNF	DNF
2019	(United States) Scuderia Cameron Glickenhaus	(France) Franck Mailleux (Germany) Thomas Mutsch (Sweden) Andreas Simonsen	Scuderia Cameron Glickenhaus SCG 003c	SP-X	154	8th	**1st**
2020	(United States) Scuderia Cameron Glickenhaus	(France) Franck Mailleux (Germany) Thomas Mutsch (United Kingdom) Richard Westbrook	Scuderia Cameron Glickenhaus SCG004c	SP-X	82	14th	**1st**
2021	(United States) Scuderia Cameron Glickenhaus	(France) Franck Mailleux (Germany) Thomas Mutsch (United Kingdom) Richard Westbrook	Scuderia Cameron Glickenhaus SCG004c	SP-X	55	20th	**2nd**
2022	(United States) Glickenhaus Racing	(France) Franck Mailleux (Germany) Thomas Mutsch (United Kingdom) Richard Westbrook	Scuderia Cameron Glickenhaus SCG004c	SP-X	155	12th	**1st**
2023	(Germany) Frikadelli Racing Team	(New Zealand) Earl Bamber (Netherlands) Nicky Catsburg (United Kingdom) David Pittard	Ferrari 296 GT3	SP9 Pro	162	**1st**	**1st**
2024	(Germany) Frikadelli Racing Team	(Germany) Daniel Keilwitz (Germany) Luca Ludwig (Argentina) Nicolás Varrone	Ferrari 296 GT3	SP9 Pro	50	12th	11th
2025	(Japan) Realize Kondo Racing with Rinaldi	(Zimbabwe) Axcil Jefferies (France) Thomas Neubauer (South Africa) David Perel	Ferrari 296 GT3	SP9 Pro	115	DNF	DNF
2026	(Germany) Walkenhorst Motorsport	(Germany) Stefan Aust (Germany) Dennis Fetzer (Ecuador) Mateo Villagómez	Aston Martin Vantage AMR GT3 Evo	SP9 Pro-Am	3	DNF	DNF

=== Complete European Le Mans Series results ===
(key) (Races in bold indicate pole position; results in italics indicate fastest lap)

Year	Entrant	Class	Chassis	Engine	1	2	3	4	5	6	Rank	Points
2020	Proton Competition	LMGTE	Porsche 911 RSR	Porsche 4.0 L Flat-6	LEC; 7	**SPA**; 4	LEC; DNS	MNZ; 5	ALG; 4		6th	47
2021	Proton Competition	LMGTE	Porsche 911 RSR-19	Porsche 4.2 L Flat-6	CAT; 6	RBR; 4	LEC	MNZ; 7	**SPA**; 4	ALG; 2	6th	57

=== Complete Le Mans Cup results ===
(key) (Races in bold indicate pole position; results in italics indicate fastest lap)

Year	Entrant	Class	Chassis	1	2	3	4	5	6	7	Rank	Points
2022	Frikadelli Racing Team	LMP3	Ligier JS P320	LEC; 23	IMO; Ret	LMS; 1; 23	LMS; 2 Ret	MNZ; 10	SPA	ALG; 11	37th	1
2023	Frikadelli Racing Team	LMP3	Ligier JS P320	CAT; 8	LMS; 1; 12	LMS; 2; 26	LEC; Ret	ARA; 16	SPA	ALG	23th	4
2024	WTM by Rinaldi Racing	LMP3	Ligier JS P320	CAT; 14	LEC; 15	LMS; 1; 2	LMS; 2; 21	SPA; 4	MUG; 8	ALG; 21	9th	23.5
2025	Rinaldi Racing	LMP3 Pro-Am	Ligier JS P325	CAT; 2	LEC; 3	LMS; 1; 1	LMS; 2; 2	SPA; Ret	SIL; 4	ALG; Ret	4th	75
2026	Rinaldi Racing	LMP3 Pro-Am	Ligier JS P325	BAR; 4	LEC; Ret	LMS; 6	SPA; 2	SIL; 2	POR; 1		3rd	91

^{*} Season still in progress.

=== Complete Asian Le Mans Series results ===
(key) (Races in bold indicate pole position) (Races in italics indicate fastest lap)

Year	Team	Class	Car	Engine	1	2	3	4	5	6	Pos.	Points
2025–26	Proton Competition	LMP2	Oreca 07	Gibson GK428 4.2 L V8	SEP; 1; 16	SEP; 2; 11	DUB; 1; 14	DUB; 2; 12	ABU; 1; 13	ABU; 2; 11	19th	0
