= Manuel Lauck =

German racing driver (born 1983)

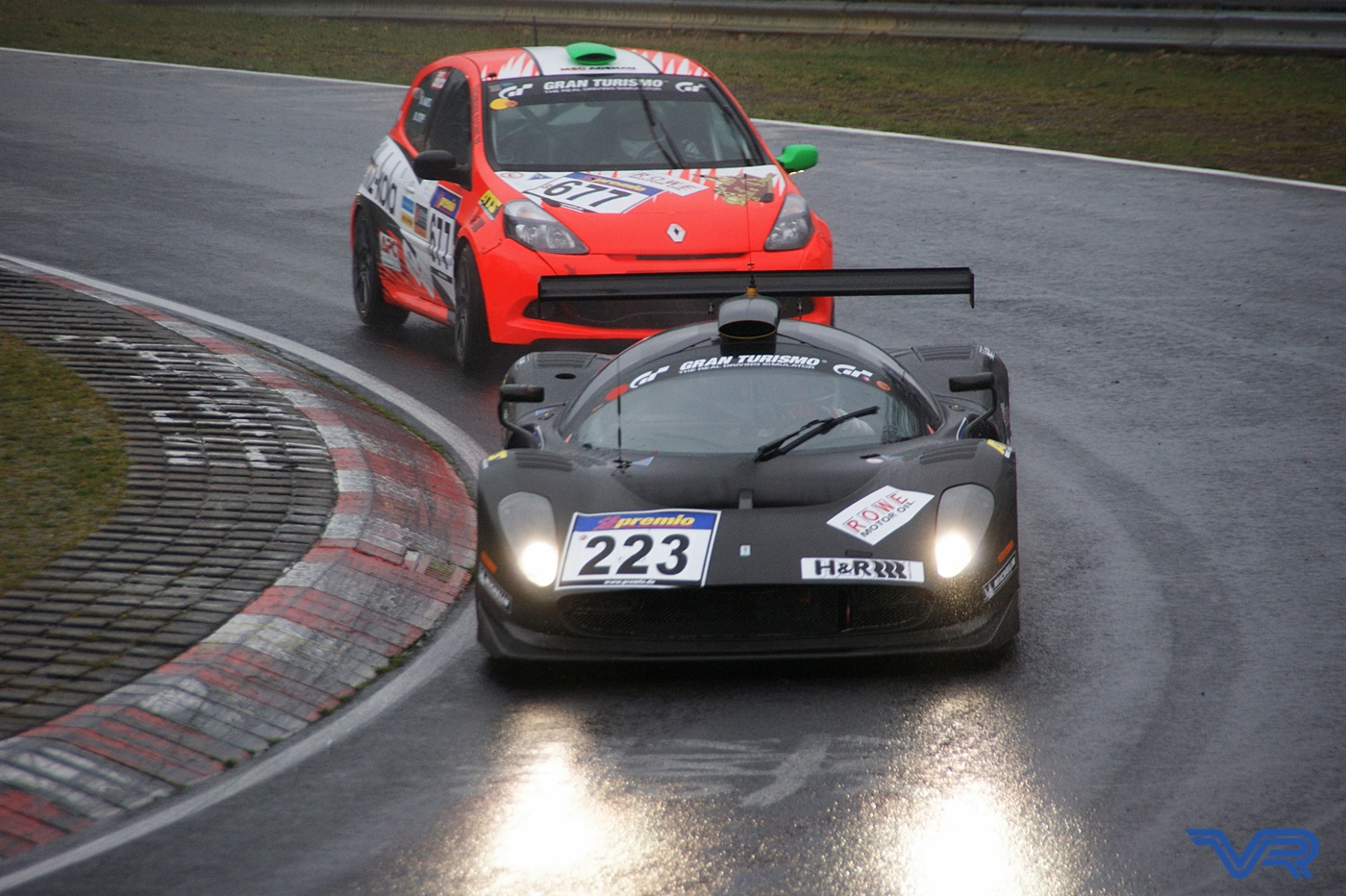
- Lauck in 2012
- Nationality: (Germany) German
- Born: 11 August 1983 (age 43) Dörsdorf, Germany
- Categorisation: FIA Silver (until 2014, 2022–); FIA Bronze (2016–2021)

Championship titles
- 2025 2021 2018: 24H Series – GT3 Pro-Am; Asian Le Mans Series – GT Am; Lamborghini Super Trofeo World Finals – Am

Manuel Lauck (born 11 August 1983) is a German racing driver who last competed in the 24H Series for Proton Competition, having been crowned champion in 2025. He is a nine-time Nürburgring 24 Hours class winner, most notably for Glickenhaus and Hyundai's factory teams, and a two-time Spa 24 Hours class winner. He scored one FIA GT1 World Championship podium at San Luis in 2011.

== Career ==
Lauck began his racing career in 2003, competing in the ADAC Volkswagen Lupo Cup. Following that, Lauck finished fourth in the 2004 ADAC Volkswagen Polo Cup standings with two wins, before switching to SEAT León Supercopa Germany for 2005 with Jörg van Ommen Autosport. Two years later, Lauck made his debut at the 24 Hours of Nürburgring, finishing third in the SP Cup class, before winning the race in SP2 in 2008. During 2008, Lauck also competed in the first four rounds of ADAC GT Masters as a privateer, driving a Porsche 911 GT3 Cup alongside Jens Richter. Over the next two seasons, Lauck made one-off appearances in the series, as well as racing at the 24 Hours of Nürburgring in both years, taking a best class result of seventh in 2010 for Pinta Racing in SP7.

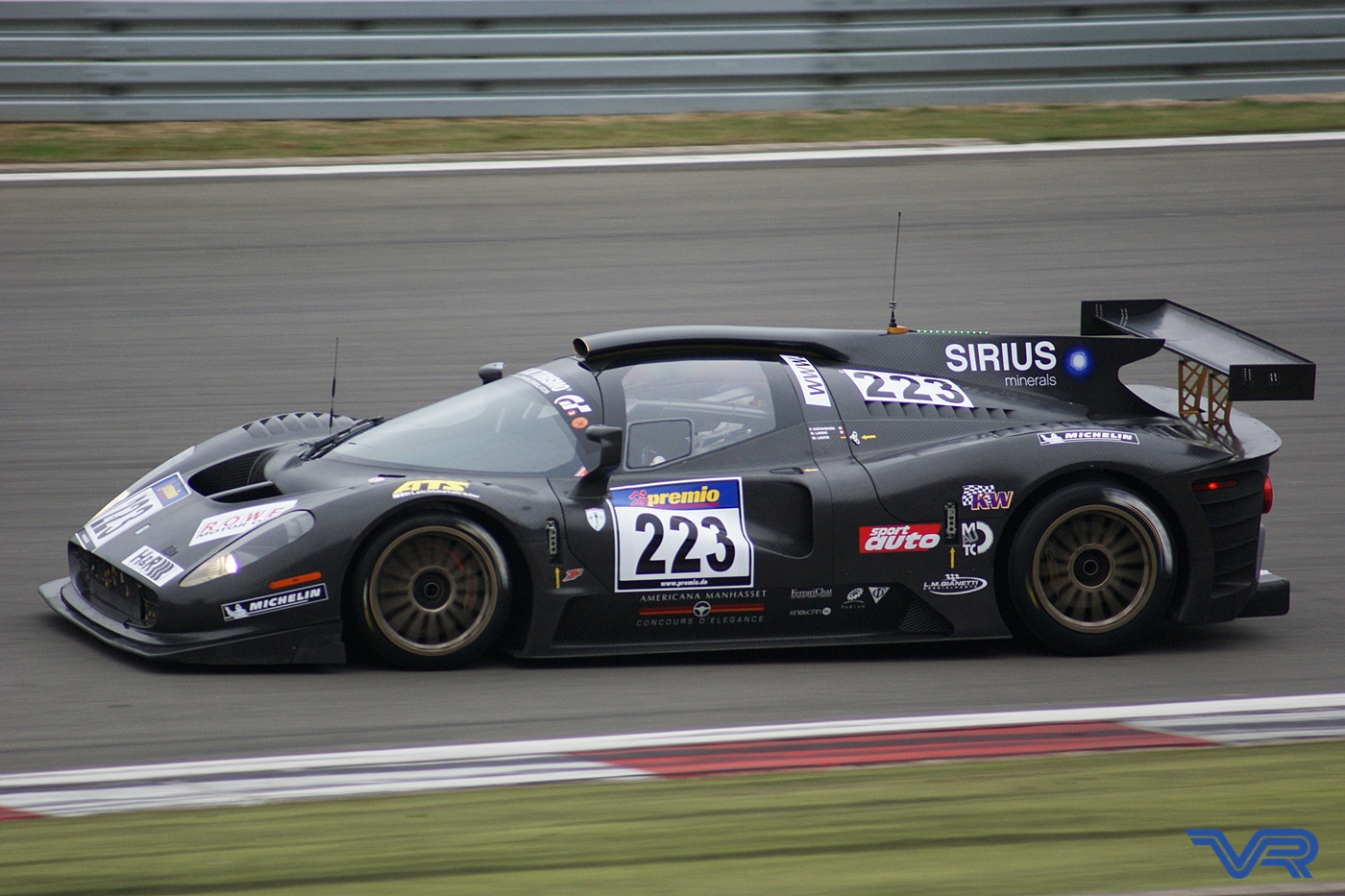
Lauck driving a Ferrari P4/5 Competizione in the VLN Series in 2012.

In 2011, Lauck returned to the 24 Hours of Nürburgring with Pinta Racing, as he made his debut in the SP9 class with the team's Porsche 997 GT3 Cup. During 2011, Lauck also competed in the final three rounds in the FIA GT1 World Championship for Lamborghini-fielding DKR www-discount.de, taking a best result of second at San Luis with Christopher Haase. After that, Lauck only raced at the Nürburgring until 2016 for a variety of teams, most notably winning the 24-hour enduro in class in 2012 and 2015, for Global Partner Enterprise SA in E1-XP and Scuderia Cameron Glickenhaus in SP-X respectively. Lauck then ventured over to Lamborghini Super Trofeo Europe for the next two seasons, most notably finishing runner-up in the AM standings and winning the World Finals in the same class for Dörr Motorsport in 2018. In 2018, Lauck also finished second at the 24 Hours of Nürburgring in the TCR class for Hyundai Motorsport N, as well as winning the SP-Y class for Dörr Motorsport.

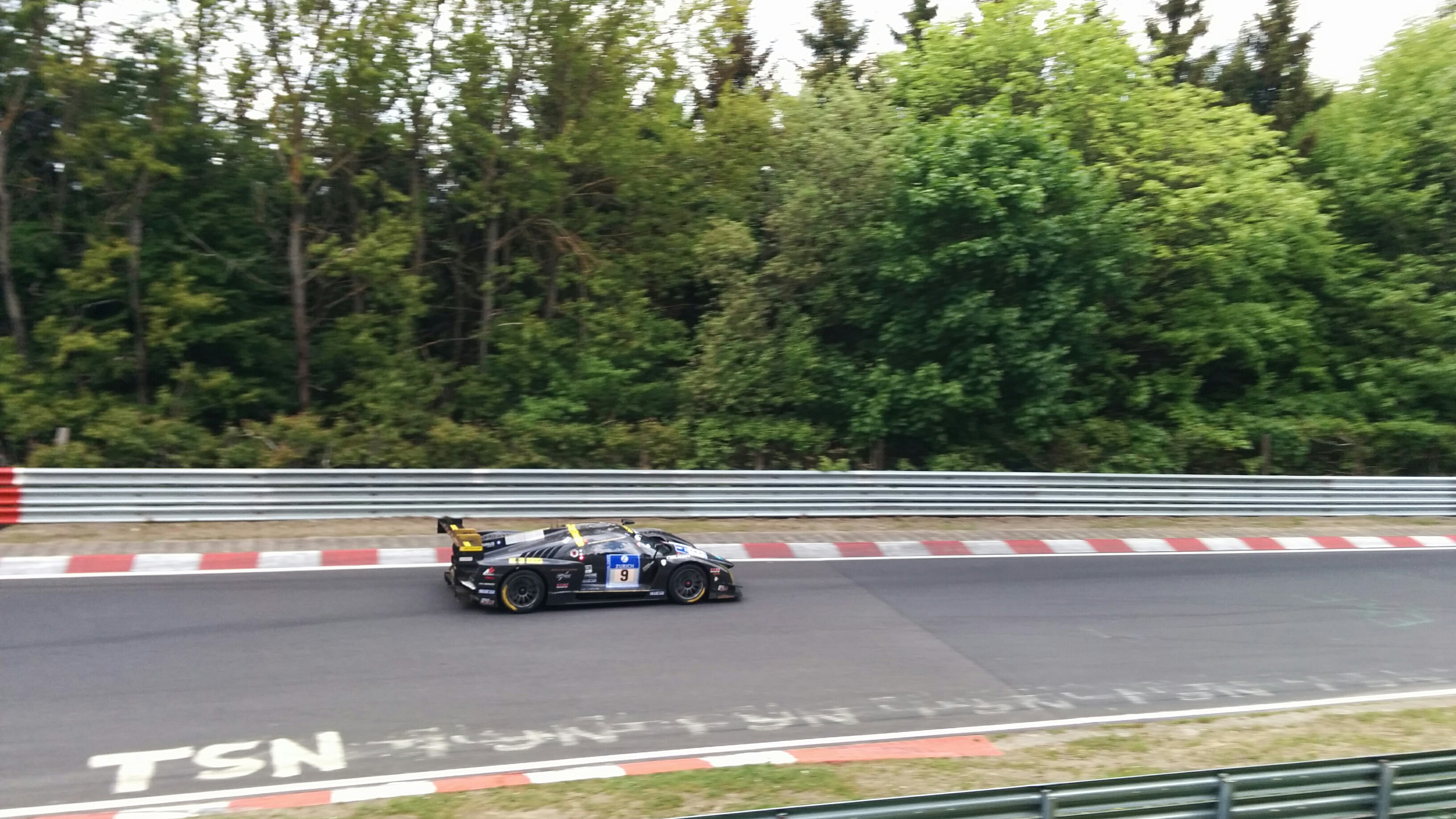
Lauck won the 2015 24 Hours of Nürburgring in SP-X for Scuderia Cameron Glickenhaus.

Returning to GT3 competition in 2019, Lauck joined Ferrari-aligned Rinaldi Racing to compete in the Am class of the Blancpain GT Series Endurance Cup. In his only full season in the series, Lauck took a class win at the 24 Hours of Spa en route to a sixth-place points finish. During 2019, Lauck also won the Gulf 12 Hours for SPS Automotive Performance in the Gentlemen class, as well as finishing second at the 24 Hours of Nürburgring's TCR class for Hyundai. In 2020, Lauck once again finished second in the TCR class of the 24 Hours of Nürburgring for Hyundai, as well as returning to Rinaldi Racing for the Le Castellet finale of the GT World Challenge Europe Endurance Cup in Pro-Am.

At the start of 2021, Lauck remained with Rinaldi Racing to compete in the GT Am class of the Asian Le Mans Series, winning the first three races and securing the class title alongside Christian Hook and Patrick Kujala. During 2021, Lauck also won the 24 Hours of Spa in the Am class for Hägeli by T2 Racing, the 24 Hours of Nürburgring in the TCR class for Hyundai and the 6 Hours of Abu Dhabi in the 992 class for Huber Racing. After two back-to-back TCR class wins at the German enduro for Hyundai, Lauck finished second in 2024, a year in which he primarily raced for Porsche-aligned Proton Huber Competition in the GT3 class of the Le Mans Cup alongside Jörg Dreisow.

Continuing with Proton Huber for 2025, Lauck raced with them in the 24H Series alongside Dreisow and Klaus Bachler in the GT3 Pro-Am class. In his first season in the series, Lauck won the 12 Hours of Paul Ricard overall, as well as taking class wins at the 12 Hours of Misano and the 24 Hours of Barcelona to seal the class and overall GT3 titles. During 2025, Lauck also took his fourth TCR class win in five years at the 24 Hours of Nürburgring for Hyundai alongside Marc Basseng and Christer Jöns. The following year, Lauck remained with the newly-rebranded Proton Competition to continue in the 24H Series alongside Dreisow and Constantin Dressler. With them, Lauck took class wins at the 12 Hours of Spa-Francorchamps and the 12 Hours of the Nürburgring, but an injury from Dreisow forced the team to withdraw from the 24 Hours of Barcelona and end their title aspirations while second in points. During 2026, Lauck also secured his fifth TCR class win at the 24 Hours of Nürburgring for Hyundai, as well as finishing third in SP4T with the team. At the end of the year, Lauck joined Porsche-fielding Herberth Motorsport to compete in the GT3 class of the 2026–27 Asian Le Mans Cup.

== Racing record ==
=== Racing career summary ===
Season	Series	Team	Races	Wins	Poles	F/Laps	Podiums	Points	Position
2003	ADAC Volkswagen Lupo Cup		10	0	0	0	3	222	9th
2004	ADAC Volkswagen Polo Cup		10	2	3	1	4	304	4th
2005	SEAT León Supercopa Germany	Jörg van Ommen Autosport	10	0	0	0	0	3	28th
2007	24 Hours of Nürburgring – SP Cup		1	0	0	0	1	—N/a	**3rd**
2007	SEAT León Supercopa Germany	Cat Race Team	2	0	0	0	1	42	16th
2008	ADAC GT Masters	Manuel Lauck	8	0	0	0	0	0	NC
2008	24 Hours of Nürburgring – SP2		1	1	0	0	1	—N/a	**1st**
2009	ADAC GT Masters	MRP-Motorsport	2	0	0	0	0	0	NC
2009	24 Hours of Nürburgring – SP10	Gentle Swiss Racing	1	0	0	0	0	—N/a	DNF
2010	24 Hours of Nürburgring – SP7	Pinta Racing	1	0	0	0	0	—N/a	7th
2010	ADAC GT Masters	Michael Illbruck	2	0	0	0	0	0	NC†
2011	Dubai 24 Hour – A6	Land Motorsport	1	0	0	1	0	—N/a	DNF
2011	VLN Series	Pinta Racing							
2011	24 Hours of Nürburgring – SP9 GT3	Pinta Racing	1	0	0	0	0	—N/a	11th
2011	ADAC GT Masters	Mühlner Motorsport	2	0	0	0	0	0	NC
2011	FIA GT1 World Championship	DKR www-discount.de	6	0	0	0	1	20	19th
2012	24 Hours of Nürburgring – E1-XP	Global Partner Enterprise SA	1	1	0	0	1	—N/a	**1st**
2013	24 Hours of Nürburgring – SP9 GT3		1	0	0	0	0	—N/a	DNF
2014	24 Hours of Nürburgring – SP9 GT3	Busch, Dennis	1	0	0	0	0	—N/a	10th
2015	VLN Series – SP7	GetSpeed Performance	1	0	0	0	0	0	NC
2015	24 Hours of Nürburgring – SP-X	Scuderia Cameron Glickenhaus	1	1	0	0	1	—N/a	**1st**
2016	24H Series – A6-Pro	Scuderia Cameron Glickenhaus	1	0	0	0	0	0	NC
2016	24 Hours of Nürburgring – SP-X	Scuderia Cameron Glickenhaus	1	0	0	0	0	—N/a	DNF
2017	Lamborghini Super Trofeo Europe – Am	GetSpeed Performance	4	0	0	0	0		
2017	Lamborghini Super Trofeo World Finals – Am	GetSpeed Performance	1	0	0	0	0		
2017	24 Hours of Nürburgring – SP7	Gigaspeed Team GetSpeed Performance	1	0	0	0	0	—N/a	6th
2018	Lamborghini Super Trofeo Europe – Am	Dörr Motorsport	12	4	3	3	11	112	**2nd**
2018	Lamborghini Super Trofeo World Finals – Am	Dörr Motorsport	2	0	0	1	2		**1st**
2018	VLN Series – TCR	Hyundai Motorsport N	2	0	0	0	0	0	NC
2018	24 Hours of Nürburgring – TCR	Hyundai Motorsport N	1	0	0	0	1	—N/a	**2nd**
2018	24 Hours of Nürburgring – SP-Y	Dörr Motorsport	1	1	0	0	1	—N/a	**1st**
2019	VLN Series – TCR	Hyundai Motorsport N	1	0	0	0	0	0	NC
2019	24 Hours of Nürburgring – TCR	Hyundai Motorsport N	1	0	0	0	1	—N/a	**2nd**
2019	Blancpain GT Series Endurance Cup	Rinaldi Racing	5	0	0	0	0	0	NC
2019	Blancpain GT Series Endurance Cup – Am	Rinaldi Racing	5	1	0	0	2	59	6th
2019	24H GT Series – A6 Am	Rinaldi Racing	1	0	0	0	0	13	NC
2019	ADAC GT4 Germany	Schütz Motorsport	2	0	0	0	0	1	38th
2019	Gulf 12 Hours – GT3 Gent	SPS Automotive Performance	1	1	0	0	1	—N/a	**1st**
2020	Nürburgring Langstrecken-Serie – TCR Pro	Hyundai Motorsport N	1	0	0	0	1	5	**3rd**
2020	24 Hours of Nürburgring – TCR	Hyundai Motorsport N	1	0	0	0	1	—N/a	**2nd**
2020	International GT Open – Am	SPS Automotive Performance	2	0	0	0	1	12	6th
2020	GT World Challenge Europe Endurance Cup	Rinaldi Racing	1	0	0	0	0	0	NC
2020	GT World Challenge Europe Endurance Cup – Pro-Am	Rinaldi Racing	1	0	0	0	0	0	NC
2021	24H GT Series – GT3 Am	Team Zakspeed	1	0	0	0	0	34	NC
2021	24H GT Series – GT3 Am	Haegeli by T2 Racing	2	1	0	0	1	34	NC
2021	6 Hours of Abu Dhabi – 992	PROFILDOORS by Huber Racing	1	1	0	0	1	—N/a	**1st**
2021	Asian Le Mans Series – GT Am	Rinaldi Racing	4	3	1	0	3	77	**1st**
2021	Nürburgring Langstrecken-Serie – TCR Pro	Hyundai Motorsport N	1	1	1	0	1	0	NC
2021	24 Hours of Nürburgring – TCR	Hyundai Motorsport N	1	1	0	0	1	—N/a	**1st**
2021	GT World Challenge Europe Endurance Cup	Hägeli by T2 Racing	1	0	0	0	0	0	NC
2021	GT World Challenge Europe Endurance Cup	Rinaldi Racing	1	0	0	0	0	0	NC
2021	GT World Challenge Europe Endurance Cup – Am	Hägeli by T2 Racing	1	1	0	0	1	0	NC
2021	GT World Challenge Europe Endurance Cup – Pro-Am	Rinaldi Racing	1	0	0	0	0	6	33rd
2022	24 Hours of Nürburgring – TCR	Hyundai Motorsport N	1	1	0	0	1	—N/a	**1st**
2022	24H GT Series Europe – GT3 Pro-Am	Huber Racing	1	0	0	0	0	18	NC
2022	Italian GT Endurance Championship – GT3 Pro-Am	Huber Racing	1	0	0	0	0	7	NC
2023	24 Hours of Nürburgring – TCR	Hyundai Motorsport N	1	1	0	0	1	—N/a	**1st**
2024	GT4 Winter Series – Pro-Am	East-Racing Motorsport	3	0	0	0	1	8.75	11th
2024	GT Winter Series – GT3	Proton Huber Competition	3	0	0	0	0	8.21	16th
2024	Le Mans Cup – GT3	Proton Huber Competition	7	0	0	0	0	13	14th
2024	Nürburgring Langstrecken-Serie – TCR	Hyundai Motorsport N	2	2	0	0	2	0	NC
2024	24 Hours of Nürburgring – TCR	Hyundai Motorsport N	1	0	0	0	1	—N/a	**2nd**
2025	Middle East Trophy – GT3 Am	Proton Huber Competition	1	0	0	0	1	16	NC
2025	GT4 Winter Series – Pro-Am	East-Racing Motorsport	3	0	0	0	1	34	8th
2025	24H Series – GT3 Pro-Am	Proton Huber Competition	5	3	0	0	4	176	**1st**
2025	Nürburgring Langstrecken-Serie – SP3T	Hyundai Motorsport N	1	0	0	0	0	0	NC
2025	Nürburgring Langstrecken-Serie – TCR	Hyundai Motorsport N	0	0	0	0	0	0	NC
2025	24 Hours of Nürburgring – TCR	Hyundai Motorsport N	1	1	0	0	1	—N/a	**1st**
2026	24H Series – GT3 Pro-Am	Proton Competition	4	2	0	0	2	124	5th
2026	Nürburgring Langstrecken-Serie – TCR	Hyundai Motorsport N	1	0	0	0	0	0	NC
2026	24 Hours of Nürburgring – TCR	Hyundai Motorsport N	1	1	0	0	1	—N/a	**1st**
2026	24 Hours of Nürburgring – SP4T	Hyundai Motorsport N	1	0	0	0	1	—N/a	**3rd**
2026–27	Asian Le Mans Cup – GT3	Herberth Motorsport							

* Season still in progress.

^{†} As Lauck was a guest driver, he was ineligible for points.

=== Complete 24 Hours of Nürburgring results ===
Year	Team	Co-Drivers	Car	Class	Laps	Pos.	Class Pos.
2007		(Germany) Christoph Dupré (Germany) Claus Dupré	Honda Civic Type R	SP Cup	90	56th	**3rd**
2008		(Germany) Ralf Martin (Germany) Matthias Luger (Germany) Elmar Jurek	Ford Fiesta	SP2	125	50th	**1st**
2009	(Switzerland) Gentle Swiss Racing	(Switzerland) Fredy Barth (Germany) Adam Osieka (Germany) Nicole Lüttecke	Aston Martin V8 Vantage N24	SP10 GT4	38	DNF	DNF
2010	(Austria) Pinta Racing	(Germany) Michael Illbruck (Germany) Jörg van Ommen (Germany) Altfrid Heger	Porsche 997 GT3 Cup	SP7	137	29th	7th
2011	(Austria) Pinta Racing	(Germany) Michael Illbruck (Germany) Jörg van Ommen (Germany) Altfrid Heger	Porsche 911 GT3 R	SP9 GT3	145	16th	11th
2012	(United States) Global Partner Enterprise SA	(Italy) Nicola Larini (Italy) Fabrizio Giovanardi	Ferrari P4/5 Competizione	E1-XP	147	12th	**1st**
2013		(Germany) Dennis Busch (Germany) Marc Busch	Audi R8 LMS ultra	SP9 GT3	24	DNF	DNF
2014	(Germany) Busch, Dennis	(Germany) Dennis Busch (Germany) Marc Busch (Austria) Stefan Landmann	Audi R8 LMS ultra	SP9 GT3	152	10th	10th
2015	(United States) Scuderia Cameron Glickenhaus	(United Kingdom) Marino Franchitti (Germany) David Jahn (France) Franck Mailleux	SCG SCG003C	SP-X	132	32nd	**1st**
2016	(United States) Scuderia Cameron Glickenhaus	(France) Franck Mailleux (Netherlands) Jeroen Bleekemolen (Germany) Felipe Fernández Laser	SCG SCG003C	SP-X	98	DNF	DNF
2016	(United States) Scuderia Cameron Glickenhaus	(United Kingdom) Jethro Bovington (United Kingdom) Chris Harris (Germany) Patrick Bernhardt	SCG P4/5 Competizione M16	E1-XP	0	DNS	DNS
2017	(Germany) Gigaspeed Team GetSpeed Performance	(Germany) Ulrich Berg (Germany) Andreas Sczepansky (Switzerland) Jean-Louis Hertenstein	Porsche 911 GT3 Cup (991)	SP7	120	84th	6th
2018	(South Korea) Hyundai Motorsport N	(Germany) Andreas Gülden (Italy) Nicola Larini (Germany) Peter Terting	Hyundai i30 N TCR	TCR	120	35th	**2nd**
2018	(Germany) Dörr Motorsport	(Germany) Marc Basseng (Belgium) Nico Verdonck	Lamborghini Huracán Super Trofeo Evo	SP-Y	107	35th	**1st**
2019	(South Korea) Hyundai Motorsport	(Germany) Marc Basseng (Belgium) Nico Verdonck (Germany) Moritz Oestreich	Hyundai Veloster N TCR	TCR	136	44th	**2nd**
2019	(South Korea) Hyundai Motorsport N	(Austria) Harald Proczyk (Germany) Peter Terting (Germany) Andreas Gülden	Hyundai i30 Fastback N	TCR	103	93rd	**3rd**
2020	(South Korea) Hyundai Motorsport N	(Germany) Marc Basseng (Germany) Moritz Oestreich (Germany) Peter Terting	Hyundai Veloster N TCR	TCR	77	23rd	**2nd**
2020	(South Korea) Hyundai Motorsport N	(Austria) Harald Proczyk (Germany) Luca Engstler (Finland) Antti Buri	Hyundai i30 N TCR	TCR	70	51st	4th
2021	(South Korea) Hyundai Motorsport N	(Germany) Marc Basseng (Germany) Moritz Oestreich	Hyundai Elantra N TCR	TCR	54	32nd	**1st**
2022	(South Korea) Hyundai Motorsport N	(Spain) Mikel Azcona (Germany) Marc Basseng	Hyundai Elantra N TCR	TCR	145	18th	**1st**
2023	(South Korea) Hyundai Motorsport N	(Spain) Mikel Azcona (Germany) Marc Basseng	Hyundai Elantra N TCR	TCR	147	26th	**1st**
2024	(South Korea) Hyundai Motorsport N	(Spain) Mikel Azcona (Germany) Marc Basseng	Hyundai Elantra N TCR (2024)	TCR	44	49th	**2nd**
2025	(South Korea) Hyundai Motorsport	(Germany) Marc Basseng (Germany) Christer Jöns	Hyundai Elantra N TCR (2024)	TCR	130	22nd	**1st**
2026	(South Korea) Hyundai Motorsport N	(Spain) Mikel Azcona (Germany) Marc Basseng (Germany) Nico Bastian	Hyundai Elantra N TCR (2024)	TCR	125	68th	**1st**
2026	(South Korea) Hyundai Motorsport N	(Spain) Mikel Azcona (South Korea) Youngchan Kim (Germany) Mark Wallenwein	Hyundai Elantra N1 RP	SP 4T	91	107th	**3rd**

=== Complete ADAC GT Masters results ===
(key) (Races in bold indicate pole position) (Races in italics indicate fastest lap)

Year	Team	Car	1	2	3	4	5	6	7	8	9	10	11	12	13	14	15	16	DC	Points
2008	Manuel Lauck	Porsche 911 GT3 Cup	OSC; 1; 19	OSC; 2; 13	NÜR1; 1; 12	NÜR1; 2; 13	NOR; 1 Ret	NOR; 2; 17	ASS; 1; 12	ASS; 2; 10	NÜR2; 1	NÜR2; 2	LAU; 1	LAU; 2	SAC; 1	SAC; 2			NC	0
2009	MRP-Motorsport	Lamborghini Gallardo GT3	OSC1; 1; 14	OSC1; 2 Ret	ASS; 1	ASS; 2	HOC; 1	HOC; 2	LAU; 1	LAU; 2	NÜR; 1	NÜR; 2	SAC; 1	SAC; 2	OSC2; 1	OSC2; 2			NC	0
2010	Michael Illbruck	Porsche 997 GT3 R	OSC1; 1	OSC1; 2	SAC; 1	SAC; 2	HOC; 1	HOC; 2	ASS; 1	ASS; 2	LAU; 1	LAU; 2	NÜR; 1	NÜR; 2	OSC2; 1; 12	OSC2; 2 Ret			NC†	0†
2011	Mühlner Motorsport	Porsche 911 GT3 Cup S	OSC; 1; 34	OSC; 2; 18	SAC; 1	SAC; 2	ZOL; 1	ZOL; 2	NÜR; 1	NÜR; 2	RBR; 1	RBR; 2	LAU; 1	LAU; 2	ASS; 1	ASS; 2	HOC; 1	HOC; 2	NC	0

=== Complete FIA GT1 World Championship results ===
Year	Team	Car	1	2	3	4	5	6	7	8	9	10	11	12	13	14	15	16	17	18	19	20	Pos.	Pts
2011	DKR www-discount.de	Lamborghini	ABU; QR	ABU; CR	ZOL; QR	ZOL; CR	ALG; QR	ALG; CR	SAC; QR	SAC; CR	SIL; QR	SIL; CR	NAV; QR	NAV; CR	LEC; QR	LEC; CR	ORD; QR; 12	ORD; CR; 15	BEI; QR; 13	BEI; CR; 9	SAN; QR; 9	SAN; CR; 2	19th	20

=== Complete GT World Challenge Europe results ===
==== GT World Challenge Europe Endurance Cup ====
Year	Team	Car	Class	1	2	3	4	5	6	7	Pos.	Points
2019	Rinaldi Racing	Ferrari 488 GT3	Am	MNZ; 34	SIL; Ret	LEC; Ret	SPA; 6H; 50	SPA; 12H; 35	SPA; 24H; 28	CAT; 26	6th	59
2020	Rinaldi Racing	Ferrari 488 GT3	Pro-Am	IMO	NÜR	SPA; 6H	SPA; 12H	SPA; 24H	LEC; Ret		NC	0
2021	Hägeli by T2 Racing	Porsche 911 GT3 R	Am	MNZ	LEC	SPA; 6H; 50	SPA; 12H; 37	SPA; 24H; 33	NÜR		NC	0
2021	Rinaldi Racing	Ferrari 488 GT3 Evo 2020	Pro-Am							CAT; 34	33rd	6

=== Complete Asian Le Mans Series results ===
(key) (Races in bold indicate pole position) (Races in italics indicate fastest lap)

Year	Team	Class	Car	Engine	1	2	3	4	Pos.	Points
2021	Rinaldi Racing	GT Am	Ferrari 488 GT3	Ferrari F154CB 3.9 L Turbo V8	DUB; 1; 1	DUB; 2; 1	**ABU**; **1**; 1	**ABU**; **2** Ret	1st	77

=== Complete Le Mans Cup results ===
(key) (Races in bold indicate pole position; results in italics indicate fastest lap)

Year	Entrant	Class	Car	1	2	3	4	5	6	7	Rank	Points
2024	Proton Huber Competition	GT3	Porsche 911 GT3 R (992)	BAR; WD	LEC; 8	LMS; 1; 16	LMS; 2; 13	SPA; 9	MUG; 10	ALG; 10	14th	13
