= Glickenhaus =

Glickenhaus may refer to:

- James Glickenhaus (born 1950), American film producer, financier, director and automotive entrepreneur
  - Shapiro-Glickenhaus Entertainment (SGE), a former home video company
  - Scuderia Cameron Glickenhaus, also commonly known as Glickenhaus, a sports car company
    - Scuderia Cameron Glickenhaus SCG 003, a sports and racing car.
