= James Glickenhaus =

American film producer

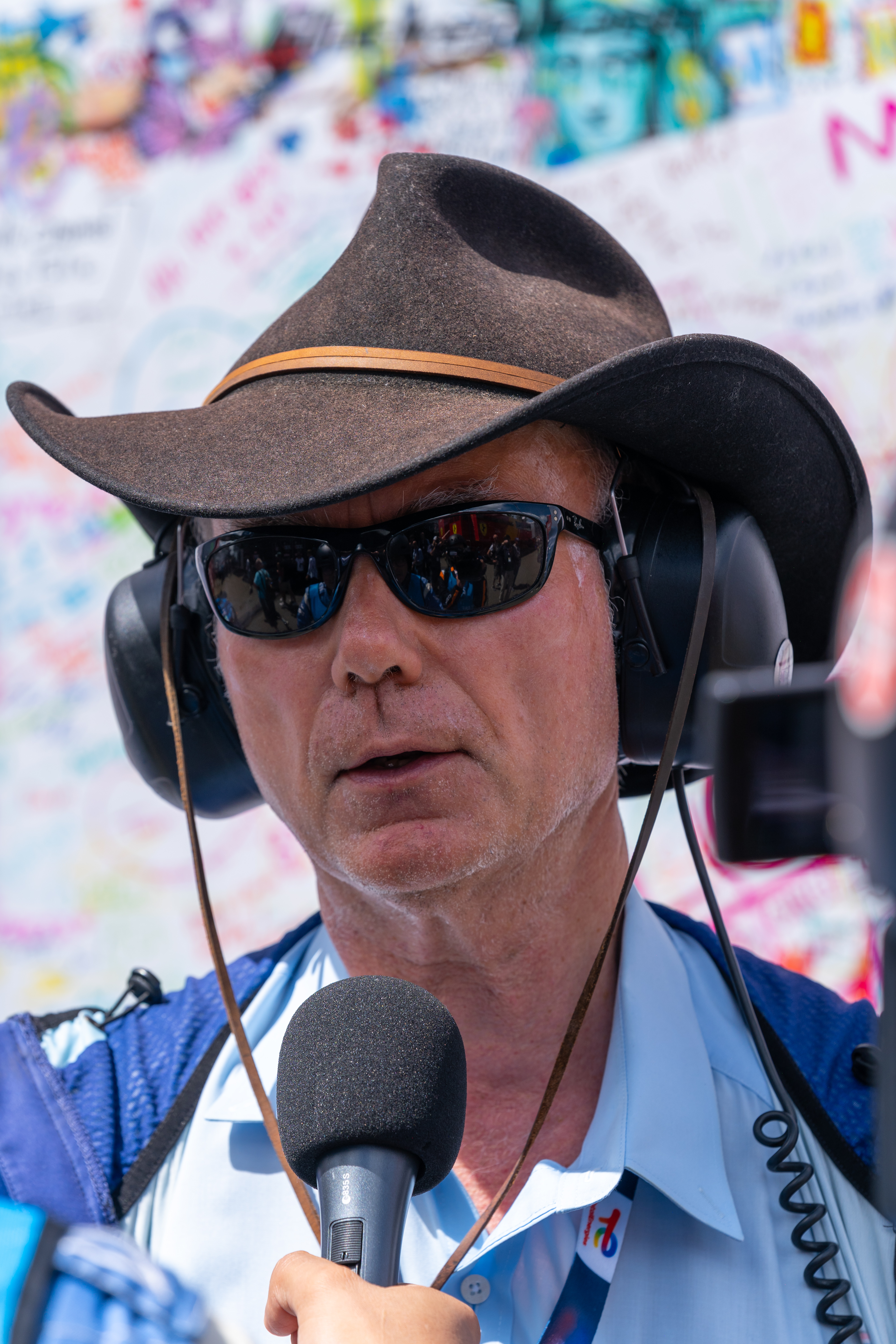
- Glickenhaus giving an interview at Le Mans
- Born: July 24, 1950 (age 76); New York City, New York, US
- Education: University of California, Los Angeles; Antioch College; Sarah Lawrence College
- Occupations: Director; producer; screenwriter; businessman
- Years active: 1975–present
- Board member of: Glickenhaus & Co.; Scuderia Cameron Glickenhaus

James Glickenhaus (born July 24, 1950) is an American financier, automotive entrepreneur, and former filmmaker. He is known to film audiences for having directed, written, and produced a number of action films during the 1980s and '90s, including The Exterminator (1980), The Soldier (1982), Shakedown (1988), and the Jackie Chan vehicle The Protector (1985). He co-founded the production and distribution company Shapiro-Glickenhaus Entertainment, which was responsible for several cult classics.

Since retiring from filmmaking, Glickenhaus has been active in the finance sector and the automotive industry. He is the co-founder of the auto manufacturer Scuderia Cameron Glickenhaus and the general partner of Glickenhaus & Co., a family partnership originally started by his father.

== Early life ==
Glickenhaus was born in New York City and raised in New Rochelle. He was educated at University of California, Los Angeles, Antioch College, and Sarah Lawrence College. Also, as a child he dreamed to race in the 24hr of Le Mans.

== Filmmaking ==
Early in his career, Glickenhause made educational and industrial films.

Glickenhaus called his first feature film, The Astrologer (1975), "a learning experience". For his next film, the vigilante film The Exterminator (1980), he decided to concentrate more on action and less on dialogue. It became a commercial success and Glickenhaus was asked by Avco-Embassy to deliver a more mainstream action film as his next project. This became the spy-thriller The Soldier (1982), starring Ken Wahl and Klaus Kinski. In a 2012 interview, Glickenhaus explained that his film career could have turned out very differently, had he decided to move to Hollywood after the success of The Exterminator:

"I was contacted a lot by studios. But I think I was afraid of the control of the studios. I had the ability to make films independently. I enjoyed doing it that way. Another part of it was I loved New York. I loved living in New York. I had a lot of friends there. And I knew if I really wanted to be a Hollywood director I would have had to move to LA and spend a lot of time socializing to make contacts. You know, for want of a better word, networking. And I wasn’t interested in doing that."

Glickenhaus made The Protector (1985) for Golden Harvest, one of several attempts by Jackie Chan to break out in the American market, on the condition that Glickenhaus "had total creative control and final cut of the movie". The version that was released internationally is the Glickenhaus version. Jackie Chan edited a different version for the Hong Kong and Japanese market.

In an interview from 2012 about his film career, he explained his reasons for retiring from the business: "What happened at the end was that the studios had taken over everything. And it was very difficult as an independent to compete with them. They could spend so much money that the stars you had access to as an independent were asking a mega amount of money. They knew you had no choice. It became harder and harder and harder."

== Automotive industry ==
=== Scuderia Cameron Glickenhaus ===
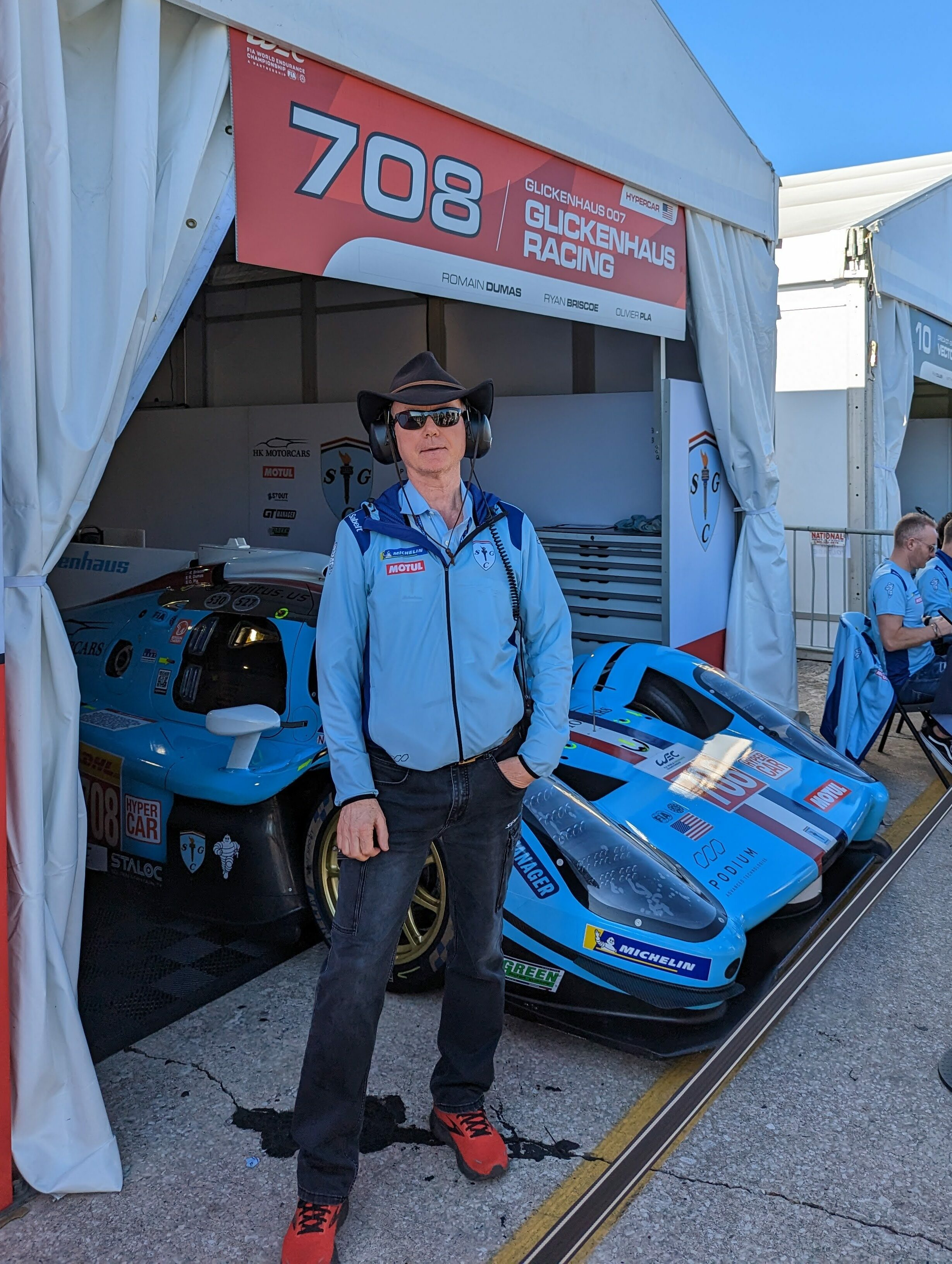
James Glickenhaus with the Glickenhaus SCG 007 LMH at the 2023 1000 Miles of Sebring

Glickenhaus is the owner and managing member of Scuderia Cameron Glickenhaus, the automobile company that Glickenhaus started. Scuderia Cameron Glickenhaus currently makes 5 types of cars, the SCG 003, SCG 004, SCG Boot, SCG 006, and the SCG 007. The race-oriented 003 takes design cues from Formula One racecars, designed to race with the Nürburgring 24 Hours in mind. The 004 is another, toned-down supercar, more fit for driving on the street. The Boot is built for racing at the Baja 1000. The 006 is the car that takes design cues from the cars of the early to mid-20th century. The 007 is Glickenhaus's entry for Le Mans Hypercar.

=== Cars that Glickenhaus owns ===
Glickenhaus is an avid collector of former racing vehicles, especially Ferraris. The cars that Glickenhaus owns in his garage include:

- 2010 SCG P 4/5 Competizione
- 2006 Ferrari P 4/5 by Pininfarina
- 1988 Ferrari 328 GTB
- 1981 Circa Piper P4 DP003
- 1970 Reworked Modulo by Pininfarina
- 1967 Ford GT40 MKIV
- 1967 Dino Berlinetta Competizione
- 1967 Baja Boot
- 1967 Ford Mk IV J6
- 1967 Ferrari 412 P 0854
- 1966 Lola T-70 Sl 71-32
- 1957 Chevrolet Belair Convertible
- 1947 Ferrari 159 Spyder Corsa
- 1932 Stutz DV-32
- 1931 Duesenberg J446

His coachbuilt 2006 Ferrari P 4/5 by Pininfarina, listed above, has been extensively covered by national publications like Car and Driver.

== Filmography ==
Year	Title	Functioned as			Notes	Ref.
Year	Title	Director	Writer	Producer	Notes	Ref.
1975	The Astrologer	Yes	Yes	No		
1980	The Exterminator	Yes	Yes	Yes		
1982	The Soldier	Yes	Yes	Yes		
1985	The Protector	Yes	Yes	No		
1988	Shakedown	Yes	Yes	No		
1991	McBain	Yes	Yes	No		
1993	Slaughter of the Innocents	Yes	Yes	No		
1995	Timemaster	Yes	Yes	No		
2008	Bad Biology	No	No	No	Actor; as 'Magazine Editor'	

=== Executive producer only ===
Year	Title	Director	Ref.
1988	Maniac Cop	William Lustig	
1990	Basket Case 2	Frank Henenlotter	
1990	Frankenhooker	Frank Henenlotter	
1992	Basket Case 3: The Progeny	Frank Henenlotter	
1994	Ring of Steel	David Frost	
1995	Tough and Deadly	Steve Cohen	
