= 2021 6 Hours of Monza =

Sports car racing event

Coordinates: 45°36′56″N 9°16′52″E

(Italy) 2021 6 Hours of Monza
Event information
- Round 3 of 6 in the 2021 FIA World Endurance Championship
- Date: 18 July 2021
- Location: Monza
- Venue: Autodromo Nazionale di Monza
- Duration: 6 Hours

Results
- Laps completed: 204
- Distance (km): 1181.772
- Distance (miles): 734.4
- Hypercar

Pole position
- Time: 1:35.899
- Team: (Japan) Toyota Gazoo Racing

Winners
- Team: (Japan) Toyota Gazoo Racing
- Drivers: (United Kingdom) Mike Conway (Japan) Kamui Kobayashi (Argentina) José María López
- LMP2

Winners
- Team: (United Kingdom) United Autosports USA
- Drivers: (United Kingdom) Philip Hanson (Switzerland) Fabio Scherer (Portugal) Filipe Albuquerque
- LMP2 Pro-Am

Winners
- Team: (Netherlands) Racing Team Nederland
- Drivers: (Netherlands) Frits van Eerd (Netherlands) Giedo van der Garde (Netherlands) Job van Uitert
- LMGTE Pro

Winners
- Team: (Germany) Porsche GT Team
- Drivers: (France) Kévin Estre (Switzerland) Neel Jani
- LMGTE Am

Winners
- Team: (Italy) AF Corse
- Drivers: (France) François Perrodo (Denmark) Nicklas Nielsen (Italy) Alessio Rovera

The 2021 6 Hours of Monza was an endurance sports car racing event held at Autodromo Nazionale di Monza, Monza, Italy, on 18 July 2021. It served as the third round of the 2021 FIA World Endurance Championship and was the first running of the event as part of the championship.

== Qualifying ==
=== Qualifying Results ===
Pole position winners in each class are marked in bold.

| Pos | Class | Team | Time | Gap | Grid |
|---|---|---|---|---|---|
| 1 | **Hypercar** | **No. 7 Toyota Gazoo Racing** | **1:35.899** | - | **1** |
| 2 | Hypercar | No. 8 Toyota Gazoo Racing | 1:35.961 | +0.062 | 2 |
| 3 | Hypercar | No. 36 Alpine Elf Matmut | 1:36.121 | +0.222 | 3 |
| 4 | Hypercar | No. 708 Glickenhaus Racing | 1:36.686 | +0.787 | 4 |
| 5 | Hypercar | No. 709 Glickenhaus Racing | 1:38.323 | +2.424 | 5 |
| 6 | **LMP2** | **No. 31 Team WRT** | **1:38.527** | **+2.628** | **6** |
| 7 | LMP2 | No. 22 United Autosports USA | 1:38.557 | +2.658 | 7 |
| 8 | **LMP2 Pro-Am** | **No. 21 DragonSpeed USA** | **1:38.663** | **+2.764** | **8** |
| 9 | LMP2 Pro-Am | No. 29 Racing Team Nederland | 1:38.726 | +2.827 | 9 |
| 10 | LMP2 | No. 82 Risi Competizione | 1:38.829 | +2.930 | 10 |
| 11 | LMP2 | No. 38 JOTA | 1:38.890 | +2.991 | 11 |
| 12 | LMP2 Pro-Am | No. 70 Realteam Racing | 1:39.472 | +3.573 | 12 |
| 13 | LMP2 | No. 34 Inter Europol Competition | 1:39.491 | +3.592 | 13 |
| 14 | LMP2 | No. 1 Richard Mille Racing Team | 1:39.905 | +4.006 | 14 |
| 15 | LMP2 Pro-Am | No. 20 High Class Racing | 1:40.026 | +4.127 | 15 |
| 16 | LMP2 Pro-Am | No. 44 ARC Bratislava | 1:40.413 | +4.514 | 16 |
| 17 | **LMGTE Pro** | **No. 92 Porsche GT Team** | **1:45.412** | **+9.513** | **18** |
| 18 | LMGTE Pro | No. 51 AF Corse | 1:45.477 | +9.578 | 19 |
| 19 | LMGTE Pro | No. 91 Porsche GT Team | 1:45.844 | +9.945 | 20 |
| 20 | LMGTE Pro | No. 52 AF Corse | 1:46.214 | +10.315 | 21 |
| 21 | **LMGTE Am** | **No. 33 TF Sport** | **1:47.272** | **+11.373** | **22** |
| 22 | LMGTE Am | No. 47 Cetilar Racing | 1:47.950 | +12.051 | 23 |
| 23 | LMGTE Am | No. 56 Team Project 1 | 1:48.057 | +12.158 | 24 |
| 24 | LMGTE Am | No. 61 AF Corse | 1:48.227 | +12.328 | 25 |
| 25 | LMGTE Am | No. 54 AF Corse | 1:48.403 | +12.504 | 26 |
| 26 | LMGTE Am | No. 85 Iron Lynx | 1:48.437 | +12.538 | 27 |
| 27 | LMGTE Am | No. 98 Aston Martin Racing | 1:48.457 | +12.558 | 28 |
| 28 | LMGTE Am | No. 388 Rinaldi Racing | 1:48.700 | +12.801 | 29 |
| 29 | LMGTE Am | No. 77 Dempsey-Proton Racing | 1:48.766 | +12.867 | 30 |
| 30 | LMGTE Am | No. 777 D'station Racing | 1:49.128 | +13.229 | 31 |
| 31 | LMGTE Am | No. 88 Dempsey-Proton Racing | 1:49.211 | +13.312 | 32 |
| 32 | LMGTE Am | No. 86 GR Racing | 1:49.244 | +13.345 | 33 |
| 33 | LMGTE Am | No. 46 Team Project 1 | 1:51.051 | +15.152 | 34 |
| 34 | LMP2 | No. 28 JOTA | No Time | | 17 |
| 35 | LMGTE Am | No. 60 Iron Lynx | No Time | | 35 |
| 36 | LMGTE Am | No. 83 AF Corse | No Time | | 36 |

== Race ==
=== Race Result ===
The minimum number of laps for classification (70% of the overall winning car's race distance) was 142 laps. Class winners are denoted in bold and with ‡.

Final race classification
| Pos. | Class | No. | Team | Drivers | Chassis | Tyre | Laps | Time/Retired |
| Pos. | Class | No. | Team | Drivers | Engine | Tyre | Laps | Time/Retired |
|---|---|---|---|---|---|---|---|---|
| **1** | **Hypercar** | **7** | **(Japan) Toyota Gazoo Racing** | **(United Kingdom) Mike Conway** **(Japan) Kamui Kobayashi** **(Argentina) José María López** | **Toyota GR010 Hybrid** | M | **204** | **6:01:12.290‡** |
| **1** | **Hypercar** | **7** | **(Japan) Toyota Gazoo Racing** | **(United Kingdom) Mike Conway** **(Japan) Kamui Kobayashi** **(Argentina) José María López** | **Toyota 3.5 L Turbo V6** | M | **204** | **6:01:12.290‡** |
| 2 | Hypercar | 36 | (France) Alpine Elf Matmut | (Brazil) André Negrão (France) Nicolas Lapierre (France) Matthieu Vaxivière | Alpine A480 | M | 204 | +1:00.908 |
| 2 | Hypercar | 36 | (France) Alpine Elf Matmut | (Brazil) André Negrão (France) Nicolas Lapierre (France) Matthieu Vaxivière | Gibson GL458 4.5 L V8 | M | 204 | +1:00.908 |
| **3** | **LMP2** | **22** | **(United Kingdom) United Autosports USA** | **(United Kingdom) Philip Hanson** **(Switzerland) Fabio Scherer** **(Portugal) Filipe Albuquerque** | **Oreca 07** | G | **200** | **+4 Laps‡** |
| **3** | **LMP2** | **22** | **(United Kingdom) United Autosports USA** | **(United Kingdom) Philip Hanson** **(Switzerland) Fabio Scherer** **(Portugal) Filipe Albuquerque** | **Gibson GK428 4.2 L V8** | G | **200** | **+4 Laps‡** |
| 4 | Hypercar | 709 | (United States) Glickenhaus Racing | (France) Romain Dumas (France) Franck Mailleux (United Kingdom) Richard Westbrook | Glickenhaus 007 LMH | M | 200 | +4 Laps |
| 4 | Hypercar | 709 | (United States) Glickenhaus Racing | (France) Romain Dumas (France) Franck Mailleux (United Kingdom) Richard Westbrook | Glickenhaus 3.5 L Turbo V8 | M | 200 | +4 Laps |
| 5 | LMP2 | 31 | (Belgium) Team WRT | (Netherlands) Robin Frijns (Austria) Ferdinand Habsburg (France) Charles Milesi | Oreca 07 | G | 200 | +4 Laps |
| 5 | LMP2 | 31 | (Belgium) Team WRT | (Netherlands) Robin Frijns (Austria) Ferdinand Habsburg (France) Charles Milesi | Gibson GK428 4.2 L V8 | G | 200 | +4 Laps |
| 6 | LMP2 **(Pro-Am)** | 29 | (Netherlands) Racing Team Nederland | (Netherlands) Frits van Eerd (France) Paul-Loup Chatin (Netherlands) Nyck de Vries | Oreca 07 | G | 200 | +4 Laps‡ |
| 6 | LMP2 **(Pro-Am)** | 29 | (Netherlands) Racing Team Nederland | (Netherlands) Frits van Eerd (France) Paul-Loup Chatin (Netherlands) Nyck de Vries | Gibson GK428 4.2 L V8 | G | 200 | +4 Laps‡ |
| 7 | LMP2 | 34 | (Poland) Inter Europol Competition | (Poland) Jakub Śmiechowski (Netherlands) Renger van der Zande (United Kingdom) Alex Brundle | Oreca 07 | G | 199 | +5 Laps |
| 7 | LMP2 | 34 | (Poland) Inter Europol Competition | (Poland) Jakub Śmiechowski (Netherlands) Renger van der Zande (United Kingdom) Alex Brundle | Gibson GK428 4.2 L V8 | G | 199 | +5 Laps |
| 8 | LMP2 | 28 | (United Kingdom) JOTA | (Indonesia) Sean Gelael (Belgium) Stoffel Vandoorne (United Kingdom) Tom Blomqvist | Oreca 07 | G | 199 | +5 Laps |
| 8 | LMP2 | 28 | (United Kingdom) JOTA | (Indonesia) Sean Gelael (Belgium) Stoffel Vandoorne (United Kingdom) Tom Blomqvist | Gibson GK428 4.2 L V8 | G | 199 | +5 Laps |
| 9 | LMP2 (Pro-Am) | 21 | (United States) DragonSpeed USA | (Sweden) Henrik Hedman (Colombia) Juan Pablo Montoya (United Kingdom) Ben Hanley | Oreca 07 | G | 199 | +5 Laps |
| 9 | LMP2 (Pro-Am) | 21 | (United States) DragonSpeed USA | (Sweden) Henrik Hedman (Colombia) Juan Pablo Montoya (United Kingdom) Ben Hanley | Gibson GK428 4.2 L V8 | G | 199 | +5 Laps |
| 10 | LMP2 (Pro-Am) | 70 | (Switzerland) Realteam Racing | (Switzerland) Esteban García (France) Loïc Duval (France) Norman Nato | Oreca 07 | G | 198 | +6 Laps |
| 10 | LMP2 (Pro-Am) | 70 | (Switzerland) Realteam Racing | (Switzerland) Esteban García (France) Loïc Duval (France) Norman Nato | Gibson GK428 4.2 L V8 | G | 198 | +6 Laps |
| 11 | LMP2 | 1 | (France) Richard Mille Racing Team | (Colombia) Tatiana Calderón (Germany) Sophia Flörsch | Oreca 07 | G | 198 | +6 Laps |
| 11 | LMP2 | 1 | (France) Richard Mille Racing Team | (Colombia) Tatiana Calderón (Germany) Sophia Flörsch | Gibson GK428 4.2 L V8 | G | 198 | +6 Laps |
| 12 | LMP2 (Pro-Am) | 20 | (Denmark) High Class Racing | (Denmark) Jan Magnussen (Denmark) Anders Fjordbach (Denmark) Dennis Andersen | Oreca 07 | G | 197 | +7 Laps |
| 12 | LMP2 (Pro-Am) | 20 | (Denmark) High Class Racing | (Denmark) Jan Magnussen (Denmark) Anders Fjordbach (Denmark) Dennis Andersen | Gibson GK428 4.2 L V8 | G | 197 | +7 Laps |
| 13 | LMP2 | 82 | (Italy) Risi Competizione | (Republic of Ireland) Ryan Cullen (United Kingdom) Oliver Jarvis (Brazil) Felipe Nasr | Oreca 07 | G | 196 | +8 Laps |
| 13 | LMP2 | 82 | (Italy) Risi Competizione | (Republic of Ireland) Ryan Cullen (United Kingdom) Oliver Jarvis (Brazil) Felipe Nasr | Gibson GK428 4.2 L V8 | G | 196 | +8 Laps |
| 14 | LMP2 (Pro-Am) | 44 | (Slovakia) ARC Bratislava | (Slovakia) Miro Konôpka (United Kingdom) Oliver Webb (Slovakia) Matej Konôpka | Ligier JS P217 | G | 191 | +13 Laps |
| 14 | LMP2 (Pro-Am) | 44 | (Slovakia) ARC Bratislava | (Slovakia) Miro Konôpka (United Kingdom) Oliver Webb (Slovakia) Matej Konôpka | Gibson GK428 4.2 L V8 | G | 191 | +13 Laps |
| **15** | **LMGTE Pro** | **92** | **(Germany) Porsche GT Team** | **(France) Kévin Estre** **(Switzerland) Neel Jani** | **Porsche 911 RSR-19** | M | **190** | **+14 Laps‡** |
| **15** | **LMGTE Pro** | **92** | **(Germany) Porsche GT Team** | **(France) Kévin Estre** **(Switzerland) Neel Jani** | **Porsche 4.2 L Flat-6** | M | **190** | **+14 Laps‡** |
| 16 | LMGTE Pro | 51 | (Italy) AF Corse | (Italy) Alessandro Pier Guidi (United Kingdom) James Calado | Ferrari 488 GTE Evo | M | 190 | +14 Laps |
| 16 | LMGTE Pro | 51 | (Italy) AF Corse | (Italy) Alessandro Pier Guidi (United Kingdom) James Calado | Ferrari F154CB 3.9 L Turbo V8 | M | 190 | +14 Laps |
| 17 | LMGTE Pro | 91 | (Germany) Porsche GT Team | (Italy) Gianmaria Bruni (Austria) Richard Lietz | Porsche 911 RSR-19 | M | 190 | +14 Laps |
| 17 | LMGTE Pro | 91 | (Germany) Porsche GT Team | (Italy) Gianmaria Bruni (Austria) Richard Lietz | Porsche 4.2 L Flat-6 | M | 190 | +14 Laps |
| 18 | LMGTE Pro | 52 | (Italy) AF Corse | (Spain) Miguel Molina (Brazil) Daniel Serra | Ferrari 488 GTE Evo | M | 190 | +14 Laps |
| 18 | LMGTE Pro | 52 | (Italy) AF Corse | (Spain) Miguel Molina (Brazil) Daniel Serra | Ferrari F154CB 3.9 L Turbo V8 | M | 190 | +14 Laps |
| **19** | **LMGTE Am** | **83** | **(Italy) AF Corse** | **(Denmark) Nicklas Nielsen** **(France) François Perrodo** **(Italy) Alessio Rovera** | **Ferrari 488 GTE Evo** | M | **187** | **+17 Laps‡** |
| **19** | **LMGTE Am** | **83** | **(Italy) AF Corse** | **(Denmark) Nicklas Nielsen** **(France) François Perrodo** **(Italy) Alessio Rovera** | **Ferrari F154CB 3.9 L Turbo V8** | M | **187** | **+17 Laps‡** |
| 20 | LMGTE Am | 98 | (United Kingdom) Aston Martin Racing | (Brazil) Augusto Farfus (Brazil) Marcos Gomes (Canada) Paul Dalla Lana | Aston Martin Vantage AMR | M | 187 | +17 Laps |
| 20 | LMGTE Am | 98 | (United Kingdom) Aston Martin Racing | (Brazil) Augusto Farfus (Brazil) Marcos Gomes (Canada) Paul Dalla Lana | Aston Martin 4.0 L Turbo V8 | M | 187 | +17 Laps |
| 21 | LMGTE Am | 777 | (Japan) D'station Racing | (Japan) Satoshi Hoshino (Japan) Tomonobu Fujii (United Kingdom) Andrew Watson | Aston Martin Vantage AMR | M | 187 | +17 Laps |
| 21 | LMGTE Am | 777 | (Japan) D'station Racing | (Japan) Satoshi Hoshino (Japan) Tomonobu Fujii (United Kingdom) Andrew Watson | Aston Martin 4.0 L Turbo V8 | M | 187 | +17 Laps |
| 22 | LMGTE Am | 56 | (Germany) Team Project 1 | (Italy) Matteo Cairoli (Norway) Egidio Perfetti (Italy) Riccardo Pera | Porsche 911 RSR-19 | M | 187 | +17 Laps |
| 22 | LMGTE Am | 56 | (Germany) Team Project 1 | (Italy) Matteo Cairoli (Norway) Egidio Perfetti (Italy) Riccardo Pera | Porsche 4.2 L Flat-6 | M | 187 | +17 Laps |
| 23 | LMGTE Am | 77 | (Germany) Dempsey-Proton Racing | (Australia) Matt Campbell (New Zealand) Jaxon Evans (Germany) Christian Ried | Porsche 911 RSR-19 | M | 186 | +18 Laps |
| 23 | LMGTE Am | 77 | (Germany) Dempsey-Proton Racing | (Australia) Matt Campbell (New Zealand) Jaxon Evans (Germany) Christian Ried | Porsche 4.2 L Flat-6 | M | 186 | +18 Laps |
| 24 | LMGTE Am | 88 | (Germany) Dempsey-Proton Racing | (Germany) Marco Seefried (Indonesia) Andrew Haryanto (Belgium) Alessio Picariello | Porsche 911 RSR-19 | M | 186 | +18 Laps |
| 24 | LMGTE Am | 88 | (Germany) Dempsey-Proton Racing | (Germany) Marco Seefried (Indonesia) Andrew Haryanto (Belgium) Alessio Picariello | Porsche 4.2 L Flat-6 | M | 186 | +18 Laps |
| 25 | LMGTE Am | 54 | (Italy) AF Corse | (Italy) Francesco Castellacci (Italy) Giancarlo Fisichella (Switzerland) Thomas Flohr | Ferrari 488 GTE Evo | M | 186 | +18 Laps |
| 25 | LMGTE Am | 54 | (Italy) AF Corse | (Italy) Francesco Castellacci (Italy) Giancarlo Fisichella (Switzerland) Thomas Flohr | Ferrari F154CB 3.9 L Turbo V8 | M | 186 | +18 Laps |
| 26 | LMGTE Am | 85 | (Italy) Iron Lynx | (Switzerland) Rahel Frey (Denmark) Michelle Gatting (Belgium) Sarah Bovy | Ferrari 488 GTE Evo | M | 185 | +19 Laps |
| 26 | LMGTE Am | 85 | (Italy) Iron Lynx | (Switzerland) Rahel Frey (Denmark) Michelle Gatting (Belgium) Sarah Bovy | Ferrari F154CB 3.9 L Turbo V8 | M | 185 | +19 Laps |
| 27 | LMGTE Am | 86 | (United Kingdom) GR Racing | (United Kingdom) Ben Barker (United Kingdom) Tom Gamble (United Kingdom) Michael Wainwright | Porsche 911 RSR-19 | M | 185 | +19 Laps |
| 27 | LMGTE Am | 86 | (United Kingdom) GR Racing | (United Kingdom) Ben Barker (United Kingdom) Tom Gamble (United Kingdom) Michael Wainwright | Porsche 4.2 L Flat-6 | M | 185 | +19 Laps |
| 28 | LMGTE Am | 61 | (Italy) AF Corse | (Switzerland) Christoph Ulrich (United States) Simon Mann (Finland) Toni Vilander | Ferrari 488 GTE Evo | M | 185 | +19 Laps |
| 28 | LMGTE Am | 61 | (Italy) AF Corse | (Switzerland) Christoph Ulrich (United States) Simon Mann (Finland) Toni Vilander | Ferrari F154CB 3.9 L Turbo V8 | M | 185 | +19 Laps |
| 29 | LMGTE Am | 47 | (Italy) Cetilar Racing | (Italy) Antonio Fuoco (Italy) Roberto Lacorte (Italy) Giorgio Sernagiotto | Ferrari 488 GTE Evo | M | 184 | +20 Laps |
| 29 | LMGTE Am | 47 | (Italy) Cetilar Racing | (Italy) Antonio Fuoco (Italy) Roberto Lacorte (Italy) Giorgio Sernagiotto | Ferrari F154CB 3.9 L Turbo V8 | M | 184 | +20 Laps |
| 30 | LMGTE Am | 46 | (Germany) Team Project 1 | (Norway) Dennis Olsen (Norway) Anders Buchardt (United States) Maxwell Root | Porsche 911 RSR-19 | M | 183 | +21 Laps |
| 30 | LMGTE Am | 46 | (Germany) Team Project 1 | (Norway) Dennis Olsen (Norway) Anders Buchardt (United States) Maxwell Root | Porsche 4.2 L Flat-6 | M | 183 | +21 Laps |
| 31 | LMGTE Am | 388 | (Germany) Rinaldi Racing | (Germany) Pierre Ehret (Germany) Christian Hook (Netherlands) Jeroen Bleekemolen | Ferrari 488 GTE Evo | M | 182 | +22 Laps |
| 31 | LMGTE Am | 388 | (Germany) Rinaldi Racing | (Germany) Pierre Ehret (Germany) Christian Hook (Netherlands) Jeroen Bleekemolen | Ferrari F154CB 3.9 L Turbo V8 | M | 182 | +22 Laps |
| 32 | LMGTE Am | 33 | (United Kingdom) TF Sport | (Brazil) Felipe Fraga (United States) Ben Keating (Luxembourg) Dylan Pereira | Aston Martin Vantage AMR | M | 175 | +29 Laps |
| 32 | LMGTE Am | 33 | (United Kingdom) TF Sport | (Brazil) Felipe Fraga (United States) Ben Keating (Luxembourg) Dylan Pereira | Aston Martin 4.0 L Turbo V8 | M | 175 | +29 Laps |
| 33 | Hypercar | 8 | (Japan) Toyota Gazoo Racing | (Switzerland) Sébastien Buemi (New Zealand) Brendon Hartley (Japan) Kazuki Nakajima | Toyota GR010 Hybrid | M | 161 | +43 Laps |
| 33 | Hypercar | 8 | (Japan) Toyota Gazoo Racing | (Switzerland) Sébastien Buemi (New Zealand) Brendon Hartley (Japan) Kazuki Nakajima | Toyota 3.5 L Turbo V6 | M | 161 | +43 Laps |
| NC | LMP2 | 38 | (United Kingdom) JOTA | (United Kingdom) Anthony Davidson (Portugal) António Félix da Costa (Mexico) Roberto González | Oreca 07 | G | 112 | Not Classified |
| NC | LMP2 | 38 | (United Kingdom) JOTA | (United Kingdom) Anthony Davidson (Portugal) António Félix da Costa (Mexico) Roberto González | Gibson GK428 4.2 L V8 | G | 112 | Not Classified |
| DNF | Hypercar | 708 | (United States) Glickenhaus Racing | (Brazil) Luis Felipe Derani (United States) Gustavo Menezes (France) Olivier Pla | Glickenhaus 007 LMH | M | 90 | Retired |
| DNF | Hypercar | 708 | (United States) Glickenhaus Racing | (Brazil) Luis Felipe Derani (United States) Gustavo Menezes (France) Olivier Pla | Glickenhaus 3.5 L Turbo V8 | M | 90 | Retired |
| DNF | LMGTE Am | 60 | (Italy) Iron Lynx | (Italy) Claudio Schiavoni (Italy) Andrea Piccini (Italy) Matteo Cressoni | Ferrari 488 GTE Evo | M | 37 | Retired |
| DNF | LMGTE Am | 60 | (Italy) Iron Lynx | (Italy) Claudio Schiavoni (Italy) Andrea Piccini (Italy) Matteo Cressoni | Ferrari F154CB 3.9 L Turbo V8 | M | 37 | Retired |

Tyre manufacturers
Key
| Symbol | Tyre manufacturer |
|---|---|
| **G** | Goodyear |
| **M** | Michelin |

== Standings after the race ==
2021 Hypercar World Endurance Drivers' Championship

| Pos. | +/– | Driver | Points |
|---|---|---|---|
| 1 | | (Switzerland) Sébastien Buemi (Japan) Kazuki Nakajima (New Zealand) Brendon Hartley | 75 |
| 2 | | (United Kingdom) Mike Conway (Japan) Kamui Kobayashi (Argentina) José María López | 69 |
| 3 | | (France) Nicolas Lapierre (Brazil) André Negrão (France) Matthieu Vaxivière | 60 |
| 4 | | (France) Romain Dumas (United Kingdom) Richard Westbrook | 33 |
| 5 | 1 | (Australia) Ryan Briscoe | 18 |

2021 Hypercar World Endurance Championship

| Pos. | +/– | Team | Points |
|---|---|---|---|
| 1 | | (Japan) Toyota Gazoo Racing | 90 |
| 2 | | (France) Alpine Elf Matmut | 60 |
| 3 | | (United States) Glickenhaus Racing | 13 |

- Note: Only the top five positions are included for the Drivers Championship standings.

2021 LMP2 World Endurance Drivers' Championship

| Pos. | +/– | Driver | Points |
|---|---|---|---|
| 1 | 1 | (United Kingdom) Philip Hanson | 74 |
| 2 | 1 | (United Kingdom) Anthony Davidson (Portugal) António Félix da Costa (Mexico) Roberto González | 56 |
| 3 | | (Indonesia) Sean Gelael (Belgium) Stoffel Vandoorne (United Kingdom) Tom Blomqvist | 53 |
| 4 | | (Switzerland) Fabio Scherer (Portugal) Filipe Albuquerque | 51 |
| 5 | 1 | (France) Charles Milesi (Austria) Ferdinand Habsburg (Netherlands) Robin Frijns | 38 |

2021 LMP2 World Endurance Championship

| Pos. | +/– | Team | Points |
|---|---|---|---|
| 1 | 1 | (United States) No. 22 United Autosports USA | 74 |
| 2 | 1 | (United Kingdom) No. 38 JOTA | 56 |
| 3 | | (United Kingdom) No. 28 JOTA | 53 |
| 4 | 1 | (Belgium) No. 31 Team WRT | 38 |
| 5 | 1 | (Poland) No. 34 Inter Europol Competition | 37 |

- Note: Only the top five positions are included for the Drivers Championship standings.

2021 World Endurance GTE Drivers' Championship

| Pos. | +/– | Driver | Points |
|---|---|---|---|
| 1 | | (France) Kévin Estre (Switzerland) Neel Jani | 76 |
| 2 | | (United Kingdom) James Calado (Italy) Alessandro Pier Guidi | 74 |
| 3 | | (Spain) Miguel Molina (Brazil) Daniel Serra | 54 |
| 4 | | (Italy) Gianmaria Bruni (Austria) Richard Lietz | 45 |
| 5 | | (Denmark) Michael Christensen | 24 |

2021 World Endurance GTE Manufacturers' Championship

| Pos. | +/– | Team | Points |
|---|---|---|---|
| 1 | | (Italy) Ferrari | 128 |
| 2 | | (Germany) Porsche | 121 |

- Note: Only the top five positions are included for the Drivers Championship standings.
