= Ferrari P4/5 by Pininfarina =

Overview
- Manufacturer: Ferrari / Pininfarina
- Also called: Scuderia Cameron Glickenhaus P4/5 Competizione
- Production: 2006 and 2011 (2 produced, 1 road car, 1 race car)
- Assembly: Italy: Turin
- Designer: Jason Castriota at Pininfarina

Body and chassis
- Body style: Coupe
- Layout: Mid engine, RWD
- Related: Ferrari Enzo; Ferrari F430 GT3

Powertrain
- Engine: Road Car: 5,999 cubic centimetres (366.1 cu in; 5.999 L) Tipo F140 B V12; Competizione: 3,996 cubic centimetres (243.9 cu in; 3.996 L) Ferrari F131 GT V8 engine
- Power output: Road Car: 652 bhp (661 PS; 486 kW) at 7,800 rpm 657 N⋅m (485 lb⋅ft) at 5,500 rpm Competizione: 440 bhp (446 PS; 328 kW) at 7,000 rpm 460 N⋅m (339 lb⋅ft) at 5,200 rpm
- Transmission: 6-speed AMT (Both)

Dimensions
- Curb weight: Road Car: 1,200 kilograms (2,600 lb); Competizione: 1,230 kilograms (2,710 lb)

Chronology
- Successor: Scuderia Cameron Glickenhaus SCG 003C

The Ferrari P4/5 (officially known as the Ferrari P4/5 by Pininfarina) is a one-off sports car made by Italian sports car manufacturer Ferrari but redesigned by Pininfarina for film director James Glickenhaus, son of stock exchange magnate Seth Glickenhaus.

The car was initially a 2003 Enzo Ferrari but the owner James Glickenhaus preferred the styling of Ferrari's 1960s race cars, the P Series. The project cost Glickenhaus US$4 million and was officially presented to the public in August 2006 at the Pebble Beach Concours d'Elégance. Several websites were allowed to publish images of the clay model in July 2006.

== Development ==
In March 2005, Glickenhaus was approached by Pininfarina who asked if he was interested in commissioning a one-off car. Andrea Pininfarina, grandson of the company's founder later said "The Ferrari 612 Kappa and this P4/5 are the first. But we want to grow this business." indicating that Pininfarina is interested in producing other unique cars. Glickenhaus replied that he would like a modern Ferrari P, and in June of that year he signed a contract with Pininfarina to produce the car including the price, approximately US$4 million though in an interview he said "I feel they gave me more than I expected". Glickenhaus purchased the last unsold Enzo Ferrari and upon receipt of the car he took it to Pininfarina to be redesigned similar to his P4 which he also delivered to Pininfarina. Pininfarina's styling team leader, Ken Okuyama said that "Pininfarina wanted to stay away from retro design and move towards a more forward thinking supercar" as they were excited by the opportunity to build the car, not just design it.

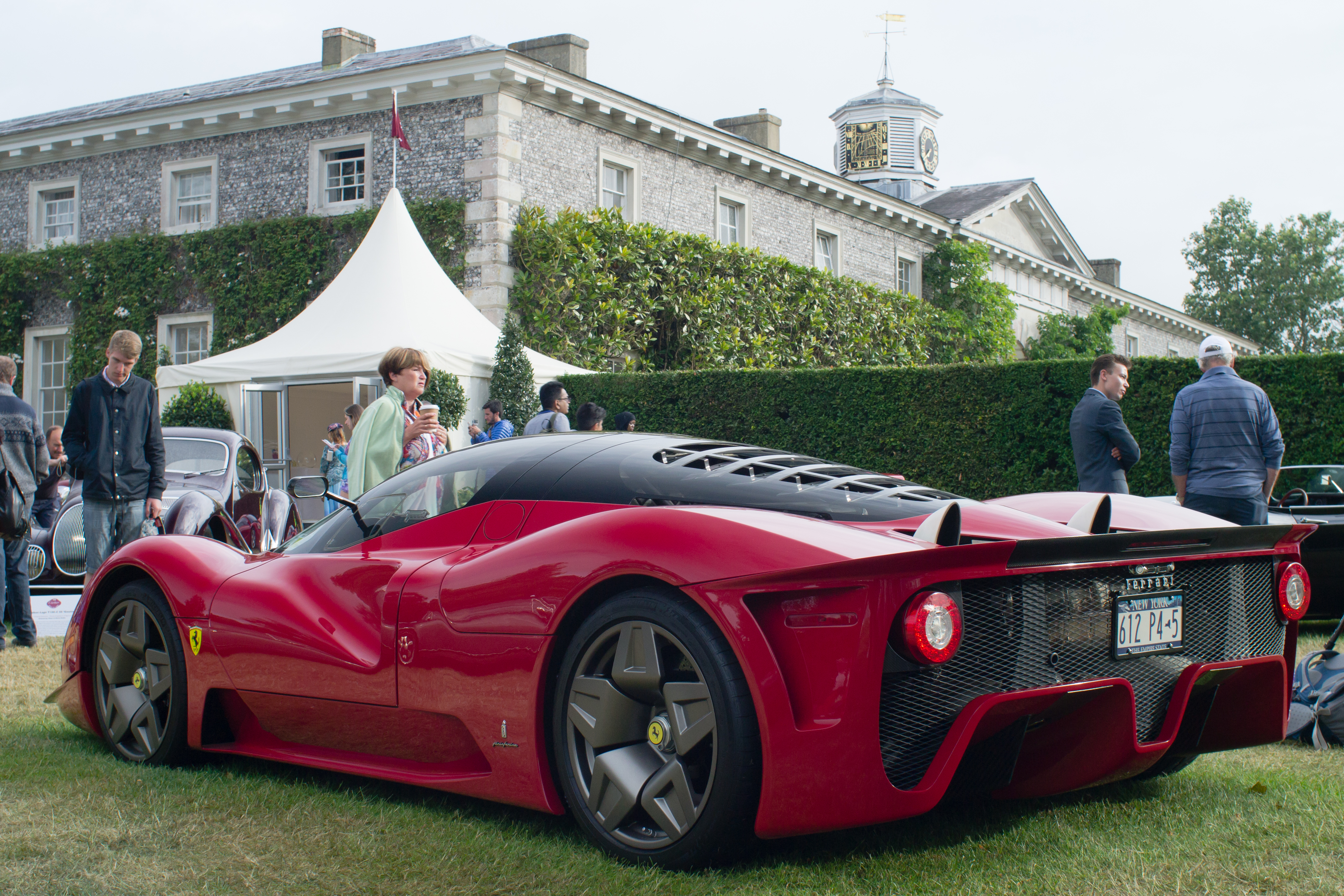
Rear view

Its design began in September 2005 with sketches by Jason Castriota moving through computer-aided sculpture and stringent wind tunnel testing. More than 200 components were designed especially for the car. Most components, including the engine, and drivetrain, are modified from the original Enzo Ferrari. The Vehicle Identification Number (VIN) is unchanged from the Enzo from which it was derived. The P4/5 was publicly revealed on August 18, 2006, at the Pebble Beach Concours d'Elégance and shown again at the Paris Motor Show in late September.

Upon seeing the P4/5, Luca di Montezemolo felt that the car deserved to be officially badged as a Ferrari. Montezemolo, along with Andrea Pininfarina and James Glickenhaus, agreed that its official name would be "Ferrari P4/5 by Pininfarina". Ted West wrote an article in Car and Driver about how this came to be "The Beast of Turin".

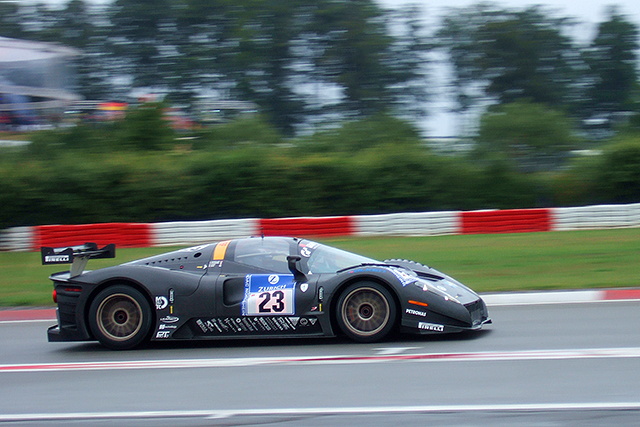
P 4/5 Competizione at the 24 Hours Nürburgring 2011

In September 2009, Glickenhaus announced his intention to race a new version of the P4/5 in 2010 24 Hours Nürburgring. The car, called the SCG P4/5 Competizione, would not be a conversion of his road car but instead an entirely new car with a Ferrari chassis, VIN and drivetrain, made under Glickenhaus's own car brand Scuderia Cameron Glickenhaus. In May 2010 however, it was revealed that the Competizione would in fact be raced in 2011, based on a 430 Scuderia. It would be built to FIA GT2 standards and raced by Scuderia Cameron Glickenhaus in an Experimental Class under the direction of Paolo Garella, former Head of Special Projects at Pininfarina. Ferrari completely distanced itself from the SCG P4/5 Competizione project in 2011, refusing to sell the team parts for vital engine rebuilds between races. The car finished 39th in the 2011 24 Hours Nürburgring (after bursting into flames) and in 2012 won its class and finished 12th overall.

== Specifications ==
The Ferrari P4/5 can accelerate from 0-100 kilometres per hour (0-62 mph) in 3.0 seconds (0.14 seconds quicker than the Enzo). Pininfarina estimated that with a taller gear, the P4/5 could reach a top speed of 225 mph (362 km/h). The car has a frontal area of 1.906 square metres (20.52 sq ft) and the sharp nose and smooth curves mean it has a drag coefficient of 0.34. The P4/5 weighs in at 2,645 lb (1,200 kg), 617 lb (280 kg) less than the Enzo.

=== Interior ===
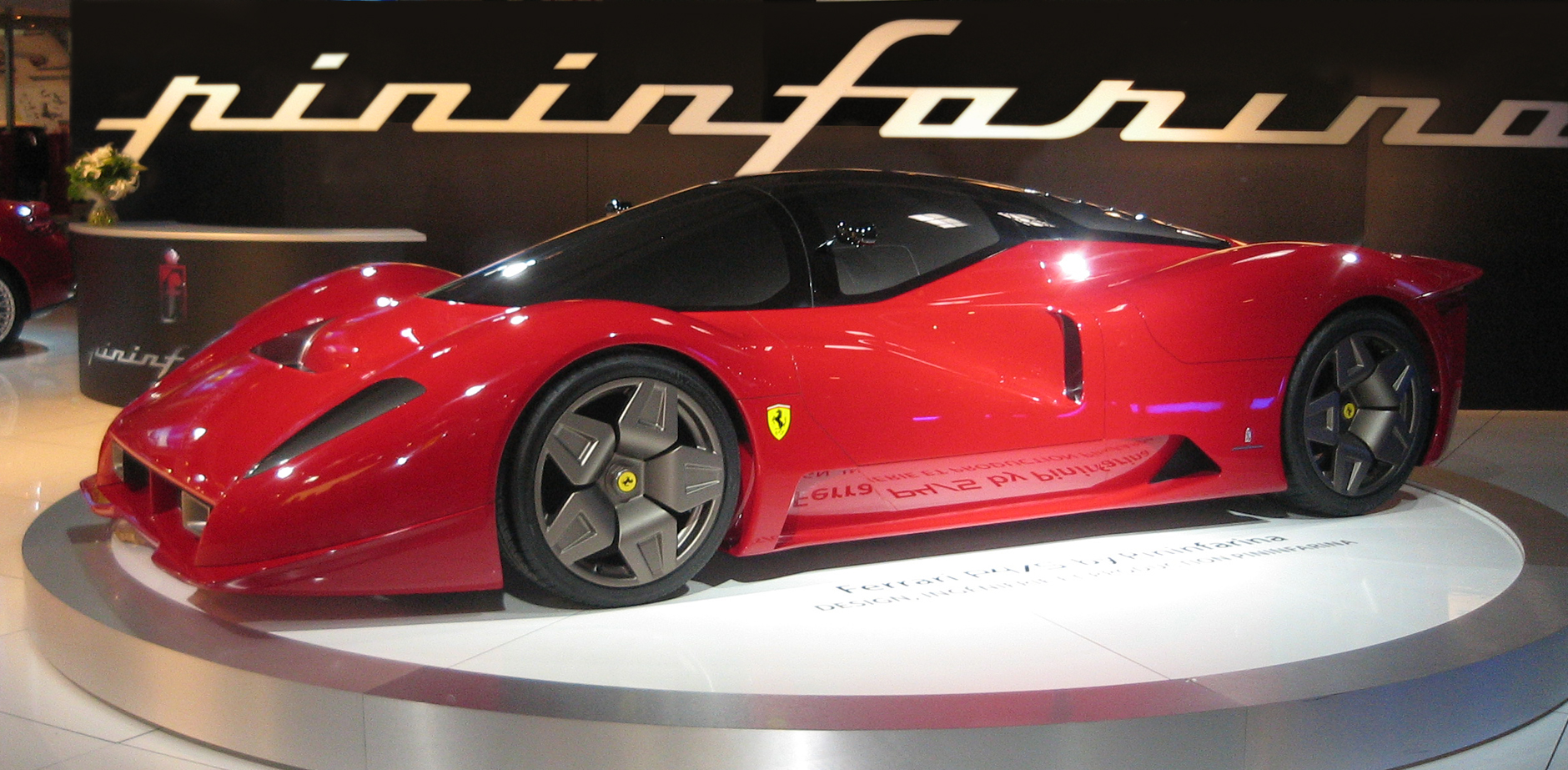
The P4/5

The interior of the P4/5 was designed by Glickenhaus himself with an iPod nano stereo and a tablet PC which features not only GPS but a 3D model of the car as well as a complete parts list and manual for easy servicing. The P4/5 also sports improved air conditioning over the Enzo and a high-strength alloy roll bar redesigned because the original was too thick and obstructed Glickenhaus' view. The seats are custom built, Glickenhaus' and his son's bodies were scanned so Pininfarina could mould the seats for their comfort, accessibility and view of the road (as with race cars). With a frame of carbon fibre composite, the seats are covered with a black mesh and red leather as selected by Glickenhaus' daughter. Pininfarina rearranged the wiring of the car so as to make the car easier to service and 595 lb (270 kg) lighter than the Enzo.

=== Exterior ===
The exterior of the car is made entirely of carbon fibre reinforced plastic and is similar in shape to the Ferrari 330 P4 as Glickenhaus requested, however it has been called a "rolling history of Ferrari-racing-DNA" sharing elements from several historic Ferrari vehicles, not just the 330 P4. The rear window is similar to that of the Ferrari 512S, the side vents are similar to the Ferrari 330 P3 and the nose is similar to that of the Ferrari 333 SP which improves cooling and the car's frontal crash safety. The butterfly doors (similar to those of the McLaren F1) are designed such that even at 160 mph (260 km/h) there is no wind noise. The improved aerodynamics give the car greater downforce, yet less drag, than the Enzo, which makes the car more stable than the Enzo at high speeds.

=== Powertrain ===
The P4/5 has the same engine as the Enzo Ferrari it was built on, a 65° Ferrari F140 B V12. The 12 cylinders have a total capacity of 5,998 cc (366 cu in), each with 4 valves. The power output is the same as the Enzo, with 660 PS (485 kW; 651 hp) at 7800 rpm and torque of 657 N⋅m (485 lb⋅ft) at 5500 rpm, with a redline at 8200 rpm. The P4/5 uses the 6 speed automated manual of the Enzo with black shifting paddles behind the wheel. It has two directional indicator buttons, one mounted on each side of the steering wheel.

=== Chassis ===
Much of the suspension was unchanged from the original Enzo, with the same push-rod suspension at the front and rear, and the same Brembo carbon-ceramic anti-lock disc brakes with a diameter of 340 mm (13.4 in) at the front and rear. The aluminium alloy wheels are 20 in (510 mm) in diameter, the front tyres have codes of ZR 255/35 and the rear, ZR 335/30.
