= SCG 004 =

Glickenhaus SCG 004
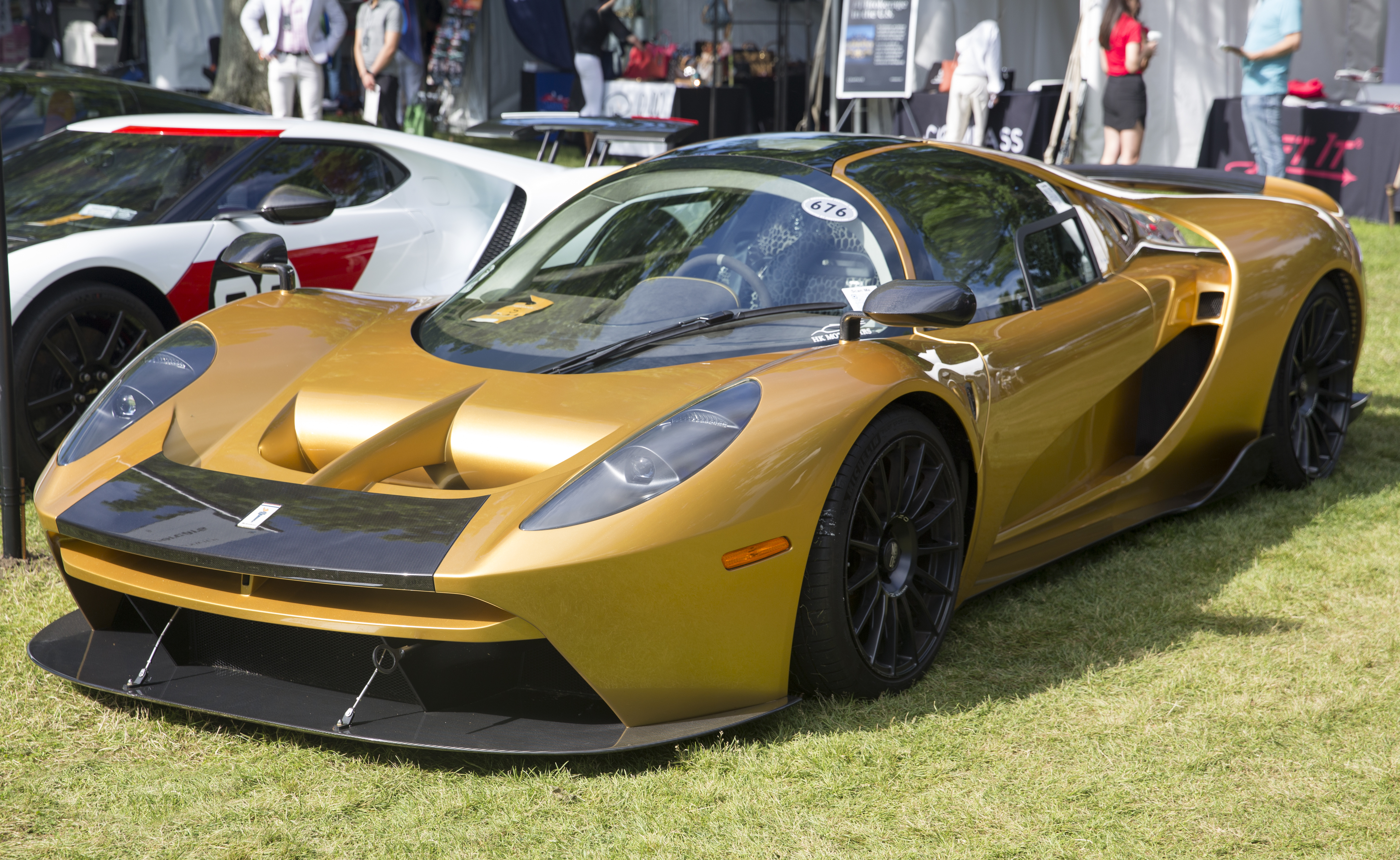
- Glickenhaus SCG 004S

Overview
- Manufacturer: Scuderia Cameron Glickenhaus LLC
- Production: 2024–present
- Designer: Michael Young

Body and chassis
- Class: Sports car (S)
- Body style: 2-door coupé
- Layout: Rear mid-engine, rear-wheel-drive

Powertrain
- Engine: 004S: 6.2-liter GM LT4 supercharged V8; 004CS: 6.2-liter GM LT5 supercharged V8; 004C: 6.2-liter naturally-aspirated V8
- Power output: 004S: 650 hp (485 kW) 720 N⋅m (531 lb⋅ft); 004CS: 850 hp (634 kW) 720 N⋅m (531 lb⋅ft); 004C: 520 hp (388 kW) 720 N⋅m (531 lb⋅ft)
- Transmission: 004S: 6-speed Graziano or CIMA manual; 004CS: 7-speed Graziano dual-clutch; 004C: 6-speed Xtrac sequential manual

Dimensions
- Curb weight: 004S: 1,179 kg (2,599 lb)

Chronology
- Predecessor: SCG 003

The Scuderia Cameron Glickenhaus SCG 004 is a sports car developed and manufactured by American boutique car maker Scuderia Cameron Glickenhaus LLC. It is the manufacturer's second model after the 003 of 2017.

The SCG 004S was unveiled by Scuderia Cameron Glickenhaus in November 2017. In August 2020, the manufacturer presented the production version of the 004S and announced plans to start production in October 2020 at the Connecticut plant in the United States. After several delays, Glickenhaus announced in December 2024 that production had commenced at Roush Performance's facility in Detroit, Michigan, with deliveries starting in Q1 2025. The first customer car would eventually be delivered in February 2026.

== Variants ==
=== SCG 004S ===
The 004S or "Stradale" (Street) is the road-going version of the 004 series. The 004S adopts a retro design reminiscent of old supercars such as the Maserati MC12 of 2004 or the Ferrari P4/5 by Pininfarina for James Glickenhaus in 2006. It has the particularity of the arrangement of three passengers with the driver's seat in a central position, similar to the McLaren F1 or the recent Gordon Murray Automotive T.50.

=== SCG 004C ===
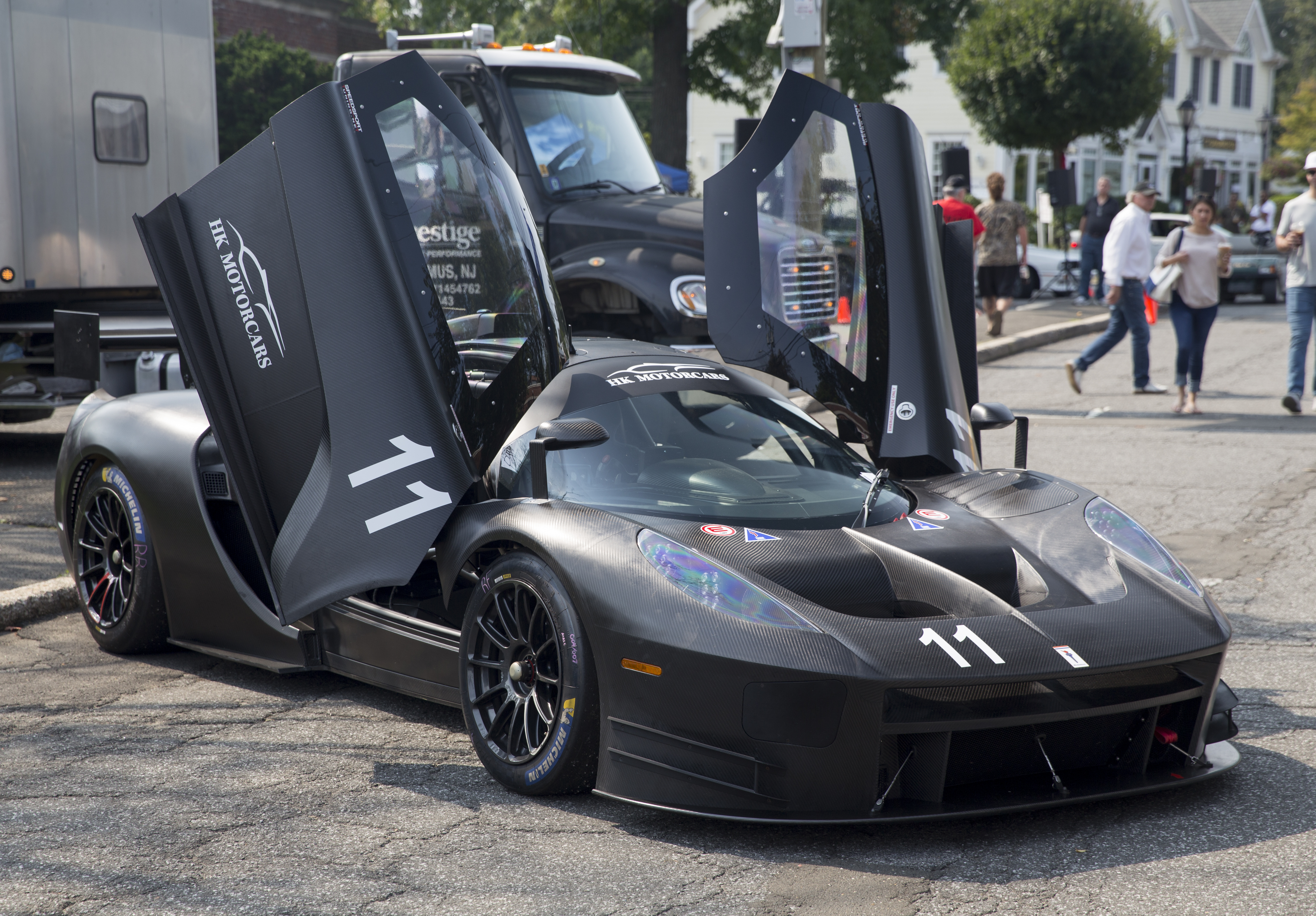
SCG 004C prototype

The SCG 004C or "Competizione" (Competition) is the racing variant of the 004 series. The car is developed to ultimately serve as a platform for LM GTE, GTLM, GT3, and GT4 categories as well as Germany's NLS series. It's powered by the 6.2-liter naturally aspirated V8 engine based on GM's LT4 block, developed by Autotechnica Motori. The car made its debut in the 2020 24 Hours of Nürburgring and finished 14th overall. In 2022 Glickenhaus announced plans for the car to make its Le Mans debut in the GT3 class in 2024, but the company ultimately chose to pull out of the FIA World Endurance Championship after 2023.

=== SCG 004CS ===
The SCG 004CS or "Competizione Stradale" (Street Competition) is a version that can swap between road and race configurations. This version can be driven on the road, but with a few simple modifications becomes a homologated race car that can be a track day car. The car will be powered by a supercharged V8 engine that can reportedly produce approximately 850 hp (634 kW).
