= SCG Boot =

Glickenhaus SCG Boot
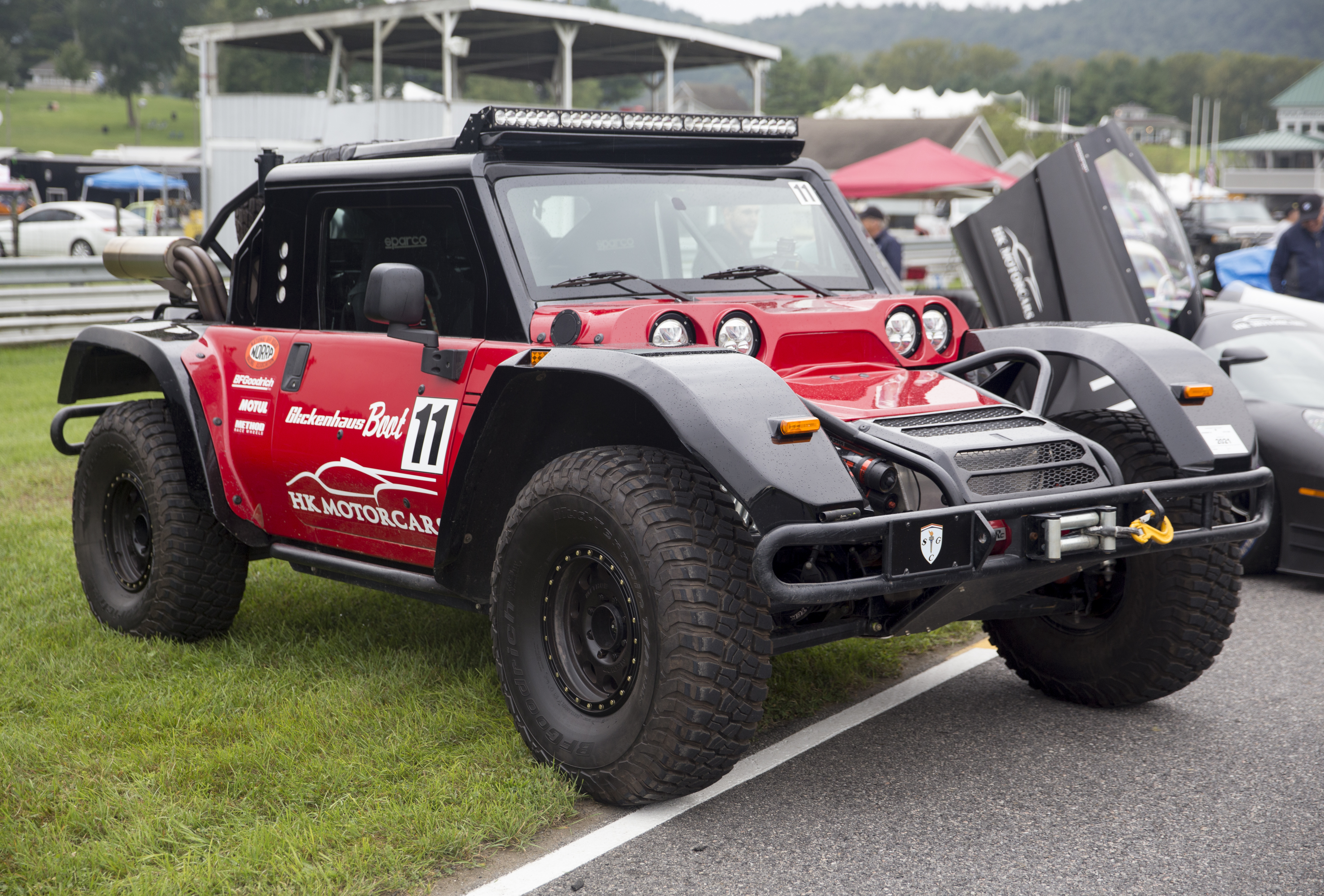

Overview
- Manufacturer: Scuderia Cameron Glickenhaus LLC
- Production: 2020–present

Body and chassis
- Layout: Mid-engine, four-wheel-drive layout

Powertrain
- Engine: 6.2 L LT4 supercharged V8
- Transmission: 4-speed automatic

Dimensions
- Wheelbase: 2,946 mm (116.0 in)
- Length: 4,622 mm (182.0 in)
- Width: 2,133 mm (84.0 in)
- Kerb weight: 2,494 kg (5,498 lb)

The Scuderia Cameron Glickenhaus SCG Boot is a mid-size off-road vehicle produced by Scuderia Cameron Glickenhaus from 2020.

== History ==
The Boot was developed by SCG, which also specializes in competing in the 24 Hours of Le Mans races and producing supercars. The benchmark was the Hurst Baja Boot off-road racing car, which was raced by Steve McQueen in the late 1960s. Following on from this vehicle, the SCG Boot gained distinctive proportions with clearly defined wheel arches, wide-tread off-road tires and quadruple round headlamps set back in line with the windshield.

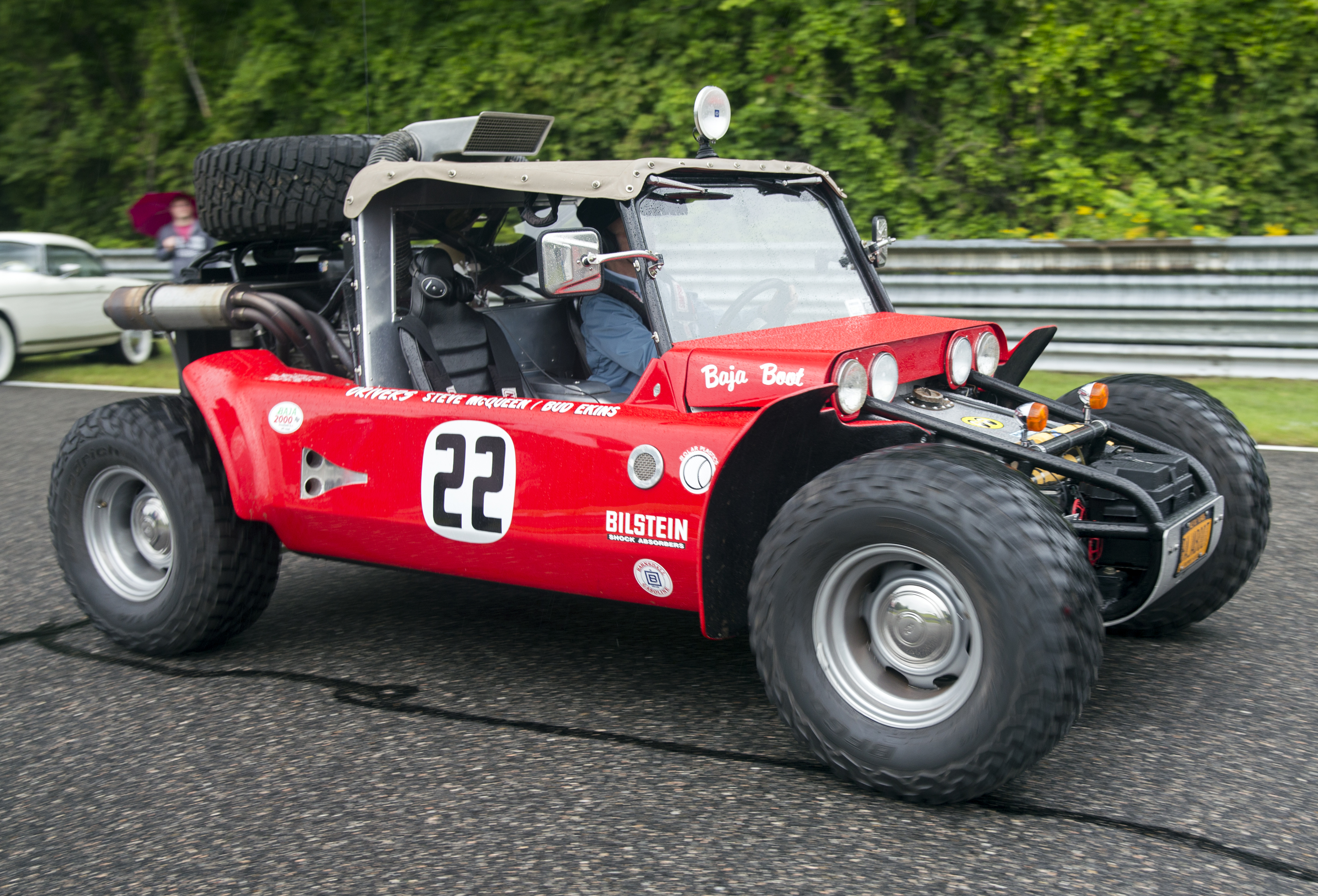
The original Hurst Baja Boot from 1967

The Boot was built in two body variants: shorter, two-door and two-seater, as well as an elongated, four-door and four-seater, which gives access to the rear row of seats through the so-called suicide doors. The Boot is equipped with both a 4-speed automatic transmission and a 6.2-liter V8 engine developed by the American automaker General Motors. The unit comes from the pony car Chevrolet Camaro and works with permanent four-wheel drive, which allows for easy driving in off-road conditions.
