= Franck Mailleux =

French racing driver (born 1985)

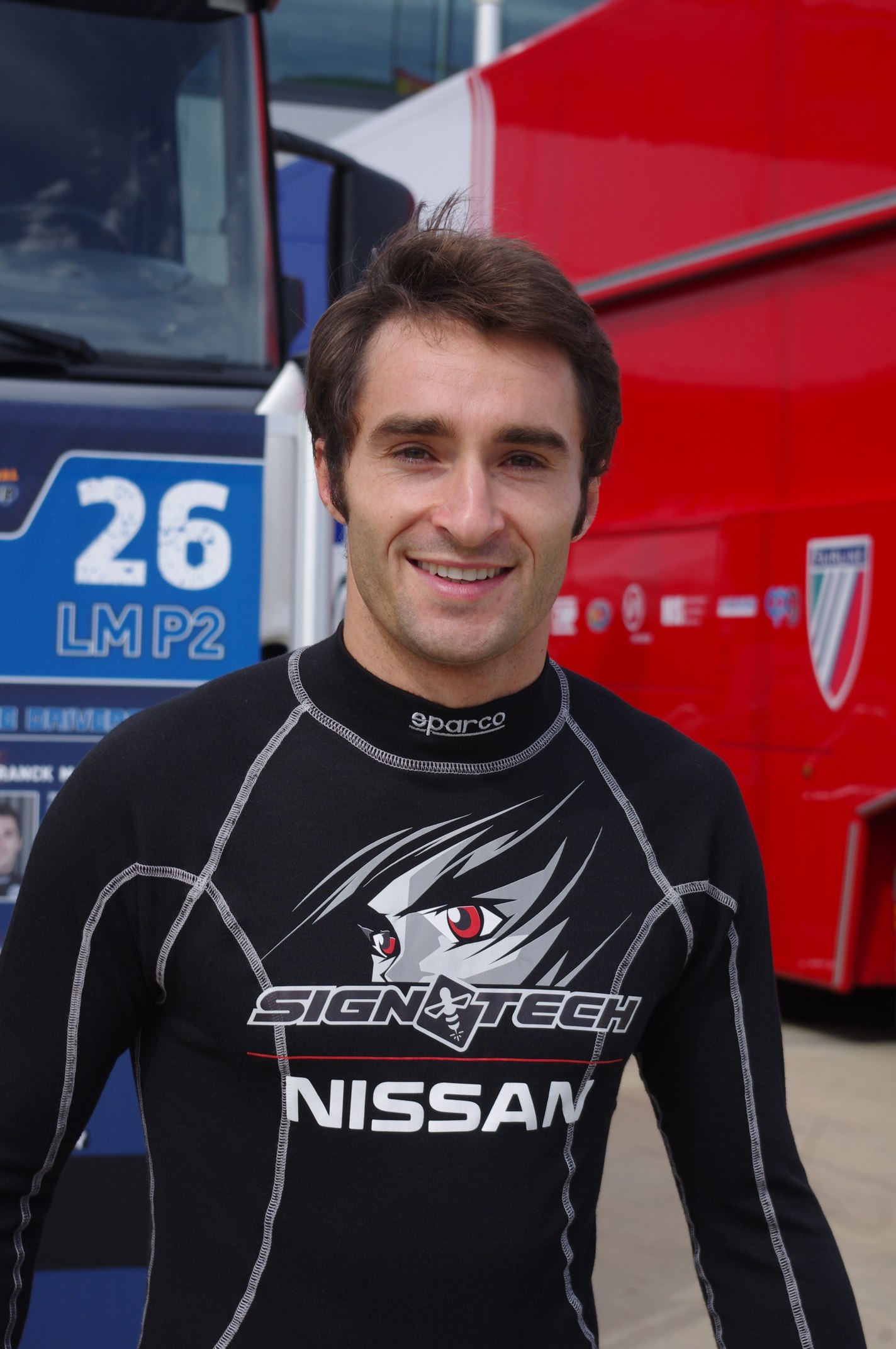
- Mailleux in 2011
- Nationality: (France) French
- Born: 27 May 1985 (age 41) Saint-Malo, France
- Categorisation: FIA Gold
24 Hours of Le Mans career
- Years: 2009 - 2022
- Teams: Signature Plus
- Best finish: 2nd (2011)
- Class wins: 0

Franck Mailleux (born 27 May 1985 in Saint-Malo, Ille-et-Vilaine) is a French racing driver. He has competed in such series as Eurocup Formula Renault 2.0 and the Formula Three Euroseries. He was champion of the 2006 Winter Series in the British Formula Renault Championship.

== Racing record ==
=== Complete Eurocup Formula Renault 2.0 results ===
(key) (Races in bold indicate pole position; races in italics indicate fastest lap)

Year	Entrant	1	2	3	4	5	6	7	8	9	10	11	12	13	14	15	16	DC	Points
2005	SG Formula	ZOL; 1; 13	ZOL; 2; 22	VAL; 1; 13	VAL; 2 Ret	LMS; 1; 6	LMS; 2 Ret	BIL; 1	BIL; 2	OSC; 1	OSC; 2	DON; 1	DON; 2	EST; 1	EST; 2	MNZ; 1	MNZ; 2	26th	5

=== Complete Formula 3 Euro Series results ===
(key) (Races in bold indicate pole position) (Races in italics indicate fastest lap)

Year	Entrant	Chassis	Engine	1	2	3	4	5	6	7	8	9	10	11	12	13	14	15	16	17	18	19	20	DC	Pts
2007	Manor Motorsport	DallaraF305/001	Mercedes	HOC; 1; 3	HOC; 2; 6	BRH; 1 Ret	BRH; 2 Ret	NOR; 1; 14	NOR; 2; 8	MAG; 1; 5	MAG; 2; 4	MUG; 1; 6	MUG; 2; 1	ZAN; 1; 5	ZAN; 2; 11	NÜR; 1; 10	NÜR; 2; 20	CAT; 1; 5	CAT; 2; 3	NOG; 1; 7	NOG; 2; 18	HOC; 1; 11	HOC; 2; 6	7th	38
2008	Signature-Plus	DallaraF308/057	VW	HOC; 1; 4	HOC; 2; 4	MUG; 1; 11	MUG; 2; 10	PAU; 1; 4	PAU; 2; 5	NOR; 1; 18	NOR; 2; 15	ZAN; 1; 11	ZAN; 2; 3	NÜR; 1; 18	NÜR; 2; 9	BRH; 1; 7	BRH; 2; 1	CAT; 1; 12	CAT; 2 Ret	LMS; 1; 23	LMS; 2; 21	HOC; 1; 17	HOC; 2; 13	10th	27

=== Complete FIA World Endurance Championship results ===
(key) (Races in bold indicate pole position) (Races in italics indicate fastest lap)

Year	Entrant	Class	Car	Engine	1	2	3	4	5	6	7	8	Rank	Points
2012	Signatech-Nissan	LMP2	Oreca 03-Nissan	Nissan 3.4 L V8	SEB; Ret	SPA; 33	LMS; 14	SIL; Ret	SAO; Ret	BHR; 7	FUJ; 15	SHA; 11	31st	8
2013	Morand Racing	LMP2	Morgan LMP2	Judd HK 3.6 L V8	SIL	SPA	LMS; 11	SAO	COA	FUJ	SHA	BHR	0	0
2014	Race Performance	LMP2	Oreca 03R	Judd HK 3.6 L V8	SIL	SPA	LMS; 13	COA	FUJ	SHA	BHR	SAO	0	0
2021	Glickenhaus Racing	Hypercar	Glickenhaus SCG 007 LMH	Glickenhaus 3.5 L Turbo V8	SPA	ALG	MNZ; 3	LMS; 4	BHR	BHR			5th	39
2022	Glickenhaus Racing	Hypercar	Glickenhaus SCG 007 LMH	Glickenhaus 3.5 L Turbo V8	SEB	SPA	LMS; 3	MNZ	FUJ	BHR				
2023	Glickenhaus Racing	Hypercar	Glickenhaus SCG 007 LMH	Glickenhaus 3.5 L Turbo V8	SEB	ALG	SPA; 7	LMS	MNZ	FUJ	BHR		12th*	6*

^{*} Season still in progress.

=== 24 Hours of Le Mans results ===
Year	Team	Co-Drivers	Car	Class	Laps	Pos.	Class Pos.
2009	(France) Signature Plus	(France) Pierre Ragues (France) Didier André	Courage-Oreca LC70E-Judd	LMP1	344	11th	10th
2010	(France) Signature Plus	(France) Pierre Ragues (Belgium) Vanina Ickx	Lola-Aston Martin B09/60	LMP1	302	DNF	DNF
2011	(France) Signatech Nissan	(France) Soheil Ayari (Spain) Lucas Ordóñez	Oreca 03-Nissan	LMP2	320	9th	**2nd**
2012	(France) Signatech Nissan	(France) Jordan Tresson (France) Olivier Lombard	Oreca 03-Nissan	LMP2	340	16th	9th
2013	(Switzerland) Morand Racing	(Switzerland) Natacha Gachnang (France) Olivier Lombard	Morgan LMP2-Judd	LMP2	320	11th	5th
2014	(Switzerland) Race Performance	(Switzerland) Michel Frey (United Kingdom) Jon Lancaster	Oreca 03R-Judd	LMP2	342	12th	8th
2021	(United States) Glickenhaus Racing	(Brazil) Pipo Derani (France) Olivier Pla	Glickenhaus SCG 007 LMH	Hypercar	367	4th	4th
2022	(United States) Glickenhaus Racing	(Australia) Ryan Briscoe (United Kingdom) Richard Westbrook	Glickenhaus SCG 007 LMH	Hypercar	375	**3rd**	**3rd**
2023	(United States) Glickenhaus Racing	(France) Nathanaël Berthon (Mexico) Esteban Gutiérrez	Glickenhaus SCG 007 LMH	Hypercar	333	7th	7th
