= Scuderia Cameron Glickenhaus =

American motor vehicle manufacturer

- Industry: Automotive
- Founded: 2004; 22 years ago
- Founder: James Glickenhaus
- Headquarters: Sleepy Hollow, New York, US
- Key people: James Glickenhaus (Chairman); Meg Cameron (Co-owner)
- Products: Sports cars, off-road vehicles
- Website: glickenhausracing.com

Scuderia Cameron Glickenhaus LLC (/ˈɡlɪkənhaʊs/ GLICK-ən-hows; commonly known as Glickenhaus, sometimes abbreviated as SCG) is an American luxury automotive manufacturer based in Sleepy Hollow, New York, United States. Founded in 2004 by American film producer and entrepreneur James Glickenhaus, the company is dedicated to developing and manufacturing its high-performance sports cars and race cars.

The company's name is a combination of the surnames of James Glickenhaus and his wife, Meg Cameron.

== History ==
American film producer and entrepreneur James Glickenhaus founded Scuderia Cameron Glickenhaus in 2004. The goal was to develop low-volume, high-performance racing cars for the Nürburgring 24 Hours races.

In 2005, James Glickenhaus, who was approached by Pininfarina asking to see if he was interested in producing a one-off car, commissioned a sports car design inspired by the Ferrari P series for US$4 million. He had purchased the last available Ferrari Enzo and sent both it and Glickenhaus' personal Ferrari P4 to Pininfarina for development upon receipt of the car. The car was revealed to the public in 2006 at the Pebble Beach Concours d'Elegance as the Ferrari P4/5 by Pininfarina. Years later, James Glickenhaus announced his intentions to take the P4/5 racing at the Nürburgring 24 Hours, and in 2011, the P4/5 Competizione was revealed as a Glickenhaus-badged sports car, utilizing the chassis and engine from the Ferrari 430 Scuderia chassis and was built to GT2 specification.

The P4/5 would serve as inspiration for Glickenhaus' sports cars moving forward. The company's first proprietary sports car built from the ground up would be presented in 2015 as the Scuderia Cameron Glickenhaus SCG 003. Its initial specification was originally presented in September 2012, with pre-production prototypes undergoing testing until December 2014. For the production of both vehicles, Italian design studio and car manufacturer Manifattura Automobili Torino lent its production lines in Turin. In 2017, a plan to launch the production of another sports car called the Scuderia Cameron Glickenhaus SCG 004 was presented, which finally went into production in 2020. At the end of 2020, Glickenhaus presented the Scuderia Cameron Glickenhaus SCG Boot, a high-performance off-road car modeled after Steve McQueen's 1967 Baja Boot.

Glickenhaus entered the Le Mans Hypercar category in 2021 with the Scuderia Cameron Glickenhaus SCG 007 LMH. It would be the first American sports car to enter the class, and at the 2022 24 Hours of Le Mans, it would become the first American sports car to score an overall podium at Le Mans in 53 years since the 1969 24 Hours of Le Mans.

=== 24 Hours of Le Mans results ===
Year	Entrant	No.	Car	Drivers	Class	Laps	Pos.	Class Pos.
2021	(United States) Glickenhaus Racing	708	Glickenhaus SCG 007 LMH	(Brazil) Pipo Derani (France) Franck Mailleux (France) Olivier Pla	Hypercar	367	4th	4th
2021	(United States) Glickenhaus Racing	709	Glickenhaus SCG 007 LMH	(Australia) Ryan Briscoe (France) Romain Dumas (United Kingdom) Richard Westbrook	Hypercar	364	5th	5th
2022	(United States) Glickenhaus Racing	708	Glickenhaus SCG 007 LMH	(Brazil) Pipo Derani (France) Romain Dumas (France) Olivier Pla	Hypercar	370	4th	4th
2022	(United States) Glickenhaus Racing	709	Glickenhaus SCG 007 LMH	(Australia) Ryan Briscoe (France) Franck Mailleux (United Kingdom) Richard Westbrook	Hypercar	375	3rd	3rd
2023	(United States) Glickenhaus Racing	708	Glickenhaus SCG 007 LMH	(Australia) Ryan Briscoe (France) Romain Dumas (France) Olivier Pla	Hypercar	335	6th	6th
2023	(United States) Glickenhaus Racing	709	Glickenhaus SCG 007 LMH	(France) Nathanaël Berthon (Mexico) Esteban Gutiérrez (France) Franck Mailleux	Hypercar	333	7th	7th

== Vehicles ==
Cars manufactured by Scuderia Cameron Glickenhaus typically carry the company's abbreviation 'SCG' as a prefix. Glickenhaus currently offers four road cars including their derivative trim levels; the SCG 003, SCG Boot, SCG 004, and SCG 007s. The company has also produced the SCG 008 kit car and previously teased the SCG 006 retro styled sports car, although neither car is currently listed on the company's website.

=== Road cars ===
- Scuderia Cameron Glickenhaus SCG 003
- Scuderia Cameron Glickenhaus SCG Boot
- Scuderia Cameron Glickenhaus SCG 004
- Scuderia Cameron Glickenhaus SCG 007s

=== Kit cars ===
- Scuderia Cameron Glickenhaus SCG 008

=== Race cars ===
- Scuderia Cameron Glickenhaus SCG 003C
- Scuderia Cameron Glickenhaus SCG 004C
- Scuderia Cameron Glickenhaus SCG 007 LMH

== See also ==
- Ferrari P4/5 by Pininfarina
