= Scuderia Cameron Glickenhaus SCG 003 =

Glickenhaus SCG 003
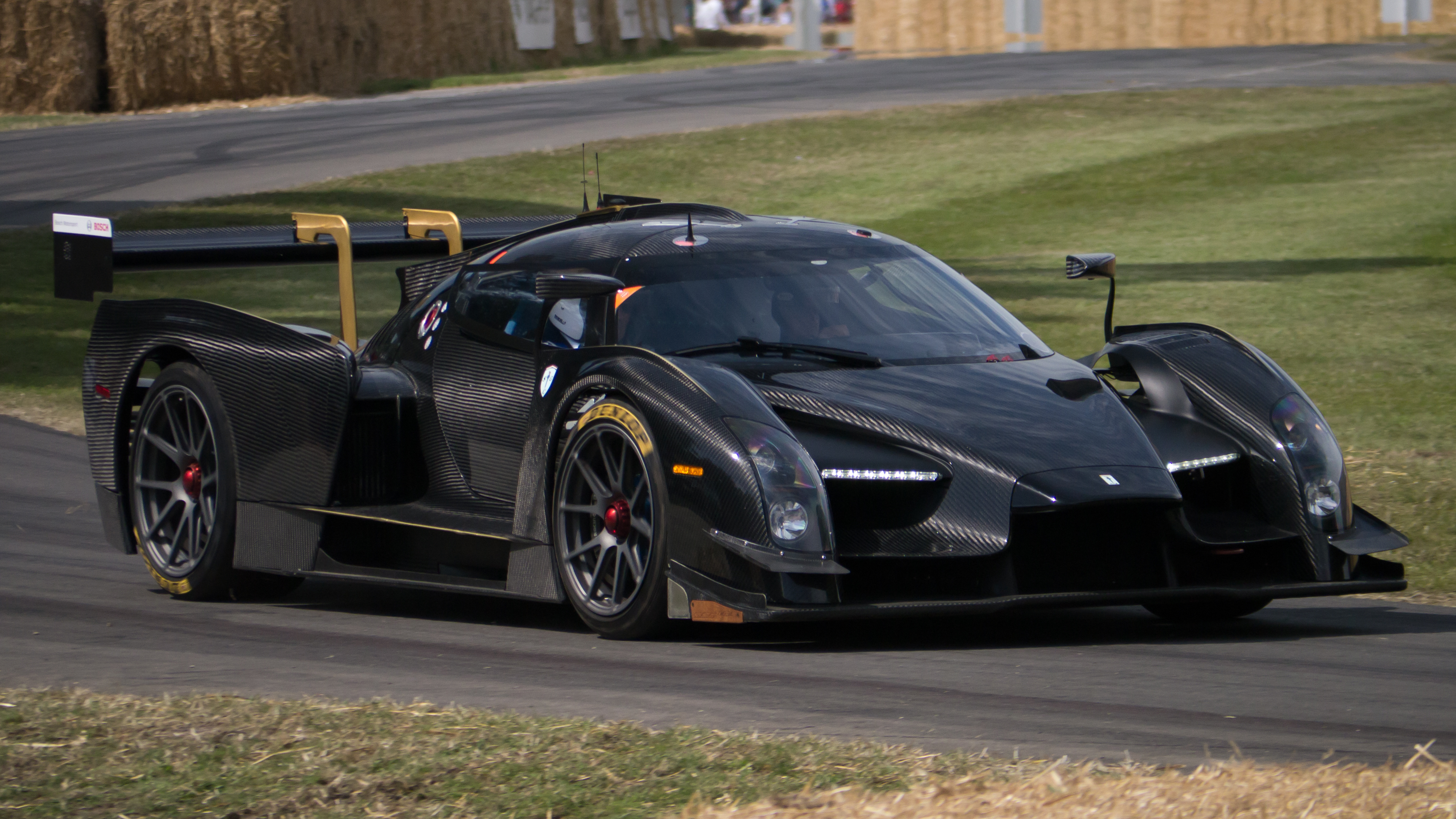
- The SCG 003CS, a track-oriented, but street-legal car, at the Goodwood Festival of Speed

Overview
- Manufacturer: Scuderia Cameron Glickenhaus LLC
- Production: 2014–present
- Assembly: Rivalta di Torino, Italy
- Designer: Lowie Vermeersch, Giovanni Piccardo and Goran Popović at Granstudio

Body and chassis
- Class: Sports car (S); Racing car
- Body style: 2-door coupé
- Layout: Rear mid-engine, rear-wheel-drive

Powertrain
- Engine: Competizione: 3.5-liter twin-turbocharged Honda HR35TT V6; Stradale: 4.4-liter Reverse-Flow twin-turbocharged BMW S63 V8
- Power output: Competizione: 490 hp (365 kW) 700 N⋅m (516 lb⋅ft); Stradale: 750 hp (559 kW) 800 N⋅m (590 lb⋅ft)
- Transmission: Competizione: 6-speed Hewland sequential manual; Stradale: 7-speed CIMA dual-clutch

Dimensions
- Wheelbase: 2,700 mm (106.3 in)
- Length: 4,810 mm (189.4 in)
- Width: 1,994 mm (78.5 in)
- Height: 1,108 mm (43.6 in)
- Kerb weight: Competizione: 1,350 kg (2,976 lb) (restricted); Stradale: 1,300 kg (2,866 lb)

Chronology
- Successor: SCG 004

The Scuderia Cameron Glickenhaus SCG 003 (developed under the code name P33) usually referred to as simply Glickenhaus SCG 003 is a limited edition sports car and racing car developed and manufactured by American boutique car maker Scuderia Cameron Glickenhaus LLC. First announced as P33 in 2013, the SCG 003 was launched in 2015 at the Geneva Motor Show.

Designed and engineered in Italy by Paolo Garella (ex Pininfarina) it is industrialized and assembled by Manifattura Automobili Torino (M.A.T.) in Rivalta di Torino. Lowie Vermeersch, Giovanni Piccardo and Goran Popović, for the Turin-based Granstudio, oversaw the complete development of the design external and internal.

On July 18, 2017, Scuderia Cameron Glickenhaus LLC's application to NHTSA to be a Low Volume Manufacturer was "deemed approved" enabling it to manufacture up to 325 turn key cars per year that do not need to adhere to Federal crash test and airbag standards but still needed to comply with emissions and safety standards in the state that they are registered in.

== Variants ==
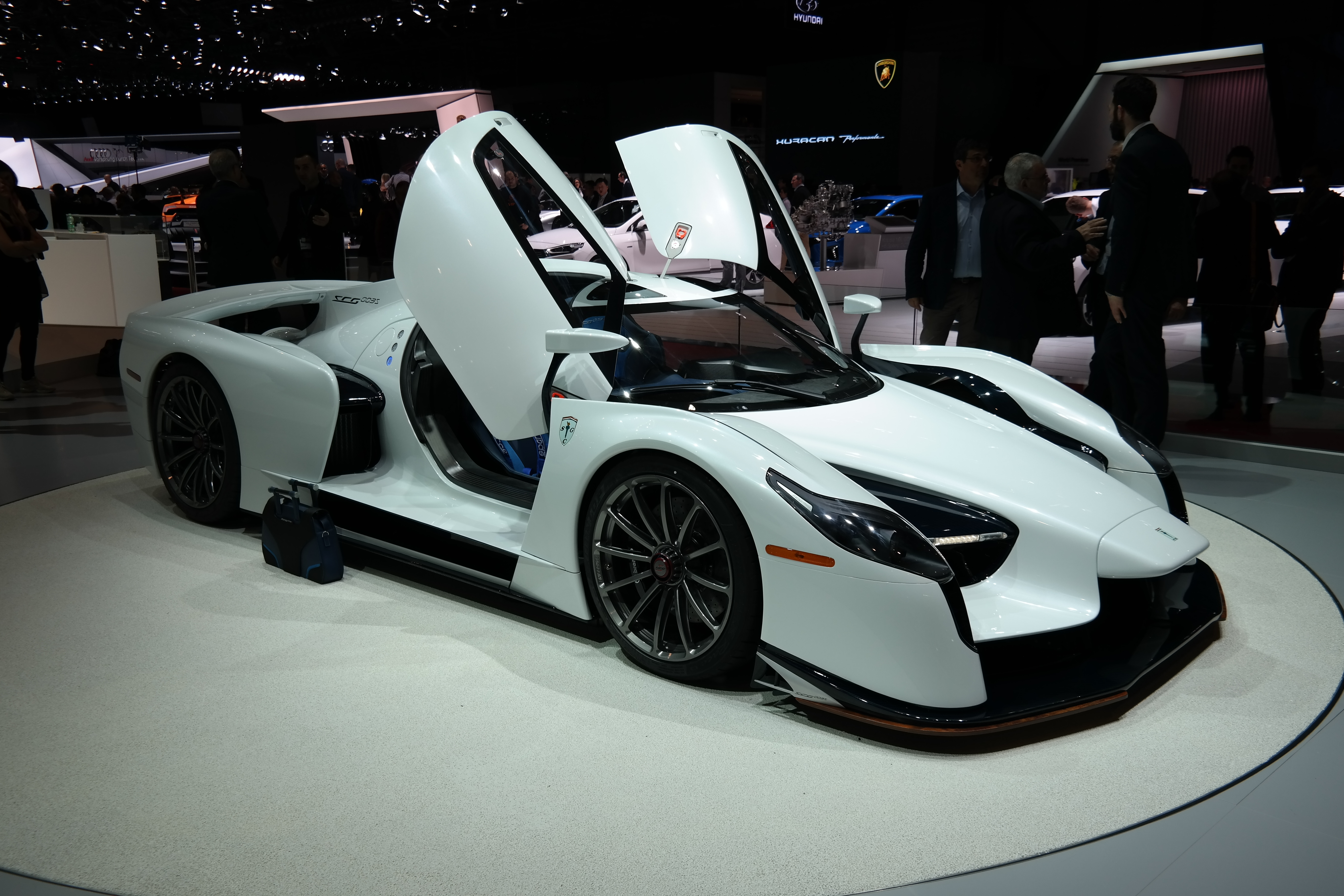
The SCG 003S, the road legal version of the 003

The company has planned to produce three variants of SCG 003 covering competition racing, track days and road driving, all with the same modular chassis to allow interchangeable parts.

The variant which competes in the 24 Hours Nürburgring is called the 003C or "Competizione" spec. It is an FIA-approved racing car with a series-approved V6 engine, a Hewland racing gearbox and race aero parts.

The 003CS or "Competizione Stradale" would be in-between the Stradale and Competizione versions in terms of specification and pricing. The 003CS is essentially a track-oriented, but road-going version, with only a minimum number of allowances made in order to make it road-legal.

The 003S "Stradale", the third model in the 003 series, is a more luxurious version of the 003C, featuring a "liveable" interior and street-friendly aerodynamic features. It is the most street-oriented version of the 003.

Both the Stradale and Competizione Stradale come standard with street-legal tires and a 4.4L twin-turbocharged BMW V8 engine to meet emissions regulations. For track-days, however, non-street-legal items could be swapped in both cars due to the modular nature of the cars and interchangeable parts.

== Technical specifications ==
The racing version called the SCG 003C wherein the C denotes "Competizione" (Competition) is powered by a Honda HR35TT 3.5-liter twin turbocharged V6 engine taken from the Honda Daytona Prototype and tuned to deliver a maximum power output of 500 hp (373 kW) restricted under FIA regulations. The engine was tuned by Autotechnica Motori of Italy. The car also has an increased weight of 1,350 kg (2,976 lb) also required by FIA regulations.

The 003CS, a model in between the 003C and 003S where the CS denotes "Competizione Stradale" (Competition Street) has the same power output as the 003S and uses the same engine but has a new carbon fiber rear wing and aerodynamic parts and weighs 1,179 kg (2,600 lb). The 003CS is meant to be a track day car which can be made road legal after the installation of road tires and license plates.

The road going model called the SCG 003S, wherein the S denotes "Stradale" (Street), will be powered by a 4.4 L (268.5 cu in) BMW twin-turbocharged V8 engine tuned to generate a maximum power output of 750 hp (559 kW) and 800 N⋅m (590 lb⋅ft) of torque enabling the 2,866 lb (1,300 kg) car to accelerate from a standstill to 60 mph in 3 seconds. Due to its aerodynamic features, the car achieves a downforce of 1,543 lb (700 kg) at a speed of 155 mph (249 km/h). The 003S is able to achieve lateral acceleration of 2.0 G. The chassis is made from carbon fiber and uses a 7-speed electro-hydraulic sequential dual disc clutch transmission.

== Motorsport ==
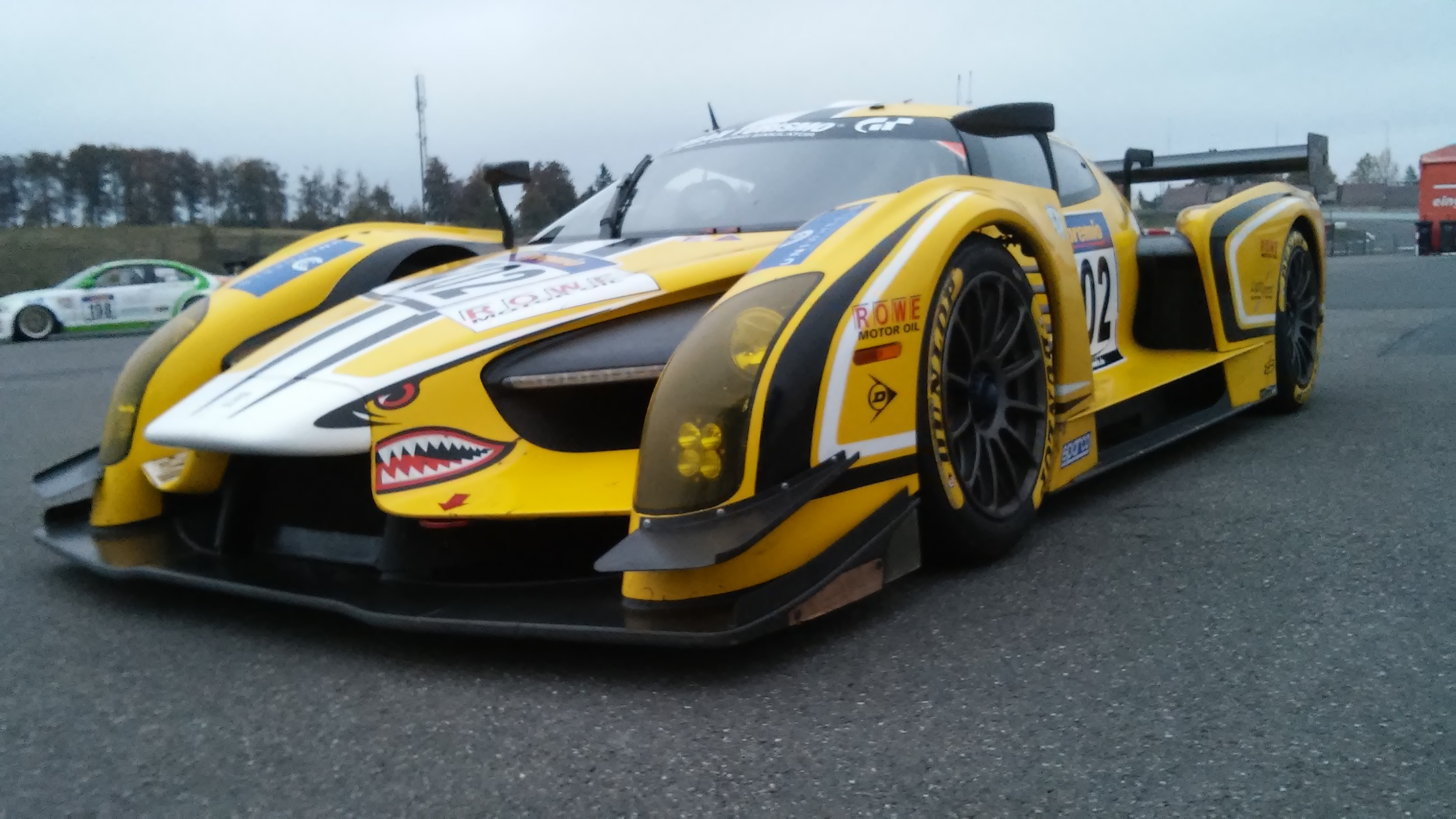
The Scuderia Cameron Glickenhaus SCG 003C GT3 by Traum Motorsport at the 24 Hours of Nürburgring

Since the introduction of SCG 003C in 2015, Scuderia Cameron Glickenhaus competed in the 24 Hours of Nürburgring and various VLN Nürburgring races in the seasons 2015–2017.

SCG competed with two cars in the 2016 24H Series 12h Mugello 2016.

In September 2016, SCG and Traum Motorsport launched a SCG 003C customer program and competed with one car in the 2016 DMV GT and Touring Car Cup (DMV-GTC) and Dunlop 60 races at Zolder.

A single SCG 003C competed with drivers Lorenzo Bontempelli and Beniamino Caccia at the 2016 International GT Open at Monza.

On May 27, 2017, during qualifying for the 24 hours endurance race on Germany's Nurburgring, Scuderia Cameron Glickenhaus competed with the Scuderia Cameron Glickenhaus SCG 003C GT3 tuned by Traum Motorsport, which was piloted by American driver Jeff Westphal covering the 12.9-mile stretch of the Nordschleife course in 6:33.20.
