= Slaughter of the Innocents (film) =

1994 film by James Glickenhaus

- Directed by: James Glickenhaus
- Written by: James Glickenhaus
- Produced by: Kirsten Bates-Renaud; Frank K. Isaac; Jefferson Richard; Leonard Shapiro; Alan M. Solomon
- Starring: Scott Glenn; Darlanne Fluegel; Kevin Sorbo; Armin Shimerman; Jesse Cameron-Glickenhaus; Aaron Eckhart
- Edited by: Kevin Tent
- Music by: Joe Renzetti
- Production company: Shapiro-Glickenhaus Entertainment
- Distributed by: MCA/Universal Home Video
- Release date: December 2, 1993 (U.S.)
- Running time: 104 minutes
- Country: United States
- Language: English
- Budget: $6.5 million

Slaughter of the Innocents is a 1993 thriller film directed by James Glickenhaus and starring Scott Glenn, Jesse Cameron-Glickenhaus, Kevin Sorbo and Armin Shimerman. It concerns an FBI investigator (Glenn) and his gifted young son (Cameron-Glickenhaus), who team up to track down a serial-killing religious fanatic. A then-unknown Aaron Eckhart has a small part.

== Plot ==
In Timberlake, Utah, two girls are murdered by a hooded figure. Five years later, Stephen Broderick is a Cleveland FBI whose gifted 10-year-old son Jesse takes an interest in his work. Jesse notices similarities between the Utah case and a new one. In both cases, the victim's mothers saw what looked like an old lady wearing a black dress picking something on the side of the road and putting it into a basket. Broderick goes to Draper Penitentiary to meet the man sentenced to death for the Provo Canyon massacre, Bobby Martel. Broderick is greeted by FBI Agent Roxanne Lemar. While footprints confirm that Martel was near the crime scene, they ask to recheck a pubic hair that was found directly on the corpse, using new technology that was not previously available. However, the warden refuses to delay the execution and Martel dies before the new tests, which exonerate him, come in.

Broderick surmises that Martel came to watch the girls undress while the killer was there. He and his son travel to Timberlake. Jesse finds sage where the old woman was seen on the night of the murders. After reading that the killer took one of the girl's ribs, and left sandal footprints, he suspects that the killer was trying to impersonate God. The killer murders the owner of a general store and screams "I will gather the species two by two" before stealing his two taxidermied birds. Through a computer program, Jesse ties the general store attack to the previous crimes. They visit the crime scene and adds further findings to their speculative profile of the killer. The killer is 6"2' tall and weighs 205 lbs, is right-handed, has never been arrested, and he is blood type b and has not been to the dentist in a long time due to bite marks found on the girl as well. They also know he drives a pre-1968 Volkswagen van.

A young girl is abducted at a gas station, Broderick goes back to Utah when news of the kidnapping reaches him, and Jesse goes home. The Utah police are called due to a foul odor coming from a house. Officer Ben Olmon finds sage hanging from the ceiling and a man, woman, and little girl in black robes along with the ritualistically murdered body of a young boy. Broderick investigates the house of the cultists who belong to a Moab religious sect. The killer goes to a public library and views books on Flemish paintings. Broderick and Roxanne get a tip from the library that a man fitting the killer's description has been there recently. They find fingerprints that match those from the previous crime scenes. Among the other books checked out by the killer is one called Mother Less Child, which deals with S&M photography. Broderick recounts that a 1930s mystic named Sarah Proctor who stored corpses in her basement and used sage to mask the smell, and surmises that the killer is using sage for the same reason.

Jesse meanwhile finds an older police report where two giraffes were stolen from the Salt Lake City Zoo, and books a flight to Salt Lake City using his father's credit card. Broderick and Roxanne investigate the former leader of the Moab sect, Robert Vale, who has since become a Neo-nazi. A confrontation ensues and Vale is killed. Jesse goes to the Salt Lake City Zoo and uses personal information he has gathered about an employee to force the latter to admit that he knows who stole the giraffes. Inside the perpetrator's locker, named Mordecai Booth, Jesse finds evidence tying him to the crimes and text on a crumpled bible page. Jesse cross checks the imagery described in the passage with locations near the PO box of Mordecai Booth. He is able to identify a closed uranium mine near Castle Rock.

Jesse rents a dirt bike and travels there. Broderick accesses Jesse's computer and finds out the coordinates of the mine. Inside the mine, Jesse finds displays of totured bodies. He also finds a life size ark covered with dead bodies and taxidermied animals. Jesse is captured by Booth and tied up to the ark near Kristi, who is still alive. Booth, having completed his ark and gathered two of every animal, asks God to send the rains and releases the ark towards a cliff. Broderick arrives and wounds Booth. He climbs aboard the ark and frees the children before the ark falls. Booth is killed in the crash, before Roxane arrives. Later, Broderick buys a cemetery plot for Bobby Martel.

== Cast ==
- Scott Glenn as FBI Special Agent Stephen Broderick
- Jesse Cameron-Glickenhaus as Jesse Broderick
- Darlanne Fluegel as Susan Broderick
- Sheila Tousey as FBI Special Agent Roxanne Lemar
- Jan Broberg Felt as Cindy Lockerby
- Elizabeth Johnson as Stephanie Lockerby
- Zitto Kazann as Mordecai Booth
- Terri Hawkes as Ellen Jenkins
- Kevin Sorbo as John Willison
- J. Stephen Brady as Bobby Martel
- Tim Colceri as Warden Bates
- Armin Shimerman as Dr. Mort Seger
- Aaron Eckhart as FBI Special Agent Ken Reynolds
- Linden Ashby as Officer Ben Olmon
- Henry Brown as Stanley Moorehead

== Production ==
=== Development ===
During pre-production, the film was known as The Innocent Ones. Some location scouting took place in Utah in July 1992. According to director/producer James Glickenhaus, the film aimed to present an accurate depiction of FBI investigations, and Scott Glenn consulted with agent John E. Douglas, after whom he modeled his character. Glenn's casting in another serial killer movie elicited comparisons to The Silence of the Lambs. Glickenhaus admitted that he was afraid that Glenn would turn down the role because of it, but hoped that the father/son pairing, which was unusual for the genre, would trump his concerns. Glenn agreed, but by the time of filming, the title had been changed to Slaughter of the Innocents, which only compounded the Silence comparisons and annoyed the actor. Despite the story's gruesome themes, Glickenhaus apparently did consider teenagers as young as the hero to be part of the target audience, believing that they could "think about and deal with the issues in the film." Camay Court Productions was the legal entity used for the project.

=== Filming ===
The film was shot in Utah and Ohio, at a cost of $6.5 million. Principal photography spanned between September 14 and October 31, 1992. It started with one week in Cleveland, which was chosen as the hero's hometown by producer Frank Isaac, a native of the city. He also decided against filming the Cleveland interiors in Utah, where most of the film would be shot, which would have been more convenient but less authentic. The FBI offices were represented by the North Point Office Building and Tower. It was close to the old Stadium, which allowed the crew to use the 70,000 fans watching the Browns play the Miami Dolphins as the backdrop of a scene, adding production value at no expense.

Filming continued for six weeks in Utah. It started in Salt Lake City on September 19, and stayed in the surrounding region for about four weeks. Some office scenes were shot inside the State Office Building in downtown SLC. The penitentiary was Utah State Prison in Draper, Utah. Some promotional materials claim that the film used the actual room where Gary Gilmore was executed. However, other sources state that the producers did not find the real execution cell moody enough and switched for another building within the facility. The house where the murder ritual takes place was property of Salt Lake County, and was located in Magna. The Provo area was used for the prologue (Provo Canyon), and some later scenes at the Municipal Airport.

The filming of the climax bookended the schedule. It was a composite of two locations. The killer's lair was set up inside Albert Poulson Mine near Redmond. A construction crew arrived three week in advance to fill in the bottom of the mine and allow the building of the Ark's rails, and part of the film crew moved in one week in advance for final preparations. The ark measured about 60 by 20 feet and weighed 3 tons. The ark's crash was shot near Moab, and sees the ship plummet from the base of Castleton Tower into Castle Rock Valley, thanks to a 110-feet high faux structure made of tubings, metal wires and painted burlap that was added to the natural rock. The ark was made of six sections that were airlifted to the launch's location. This drew the ire of the Southern Utah Wilderness Alliance, who protested to the local Bureau of Land Management to cancel the film permit, but it was determined that it would not leave lasting marks on the mountain. The decision was quickly supported by the assistant secretary of the Interior Department, effectively closing the matter in favor of the filmmakers. The structure was supposed to be ferried by helicopter to the Daystar Academy, where it would be dismantled for recycling, but bad weather forced the pilot to cut it loose, and it landed on a private property. One source also mentions that the Valley of the Gods was used in some scenes.

Post-production was slated to be completed on March 1, 1993. The film's behind-the-scenes footage were captured by Welshman Julian Richards, who became a prolific horror director in subsequent years.

=== Fatal plane crash ===
On their way back from the shoot on October 31, 1992, MCA vice-president/MCA Home Video president Rob Blattner and publicist Dale Berliner died when the Alpine Aviation Piper Cheyenne III that was transporting them crashed into the Book Cliffs near Grand Junction, Colorado. Pilot Kevin James also died in the accident.

== Release ==
=== Pre-release ===
During production, a theatrical bow through Universal Pictures was supposedly considered. Glenn hoped that the title could be changed again before release to distance the film from Silence of the Lambs, but that did not happen either.

=== Television ===
Slaughter of the Innocents premiered in the U.S. on premium cable channel HBO on December 2, 1993, as part of their "HBO World Premiere" line-up.

=== Home media ===
The film was released on VHS by MCA/Universal Home Video on April 20, 1994. MCA/U issued the LaserDisc on April 27. In 2004, it was released on DVD by Key DVD, a sublabel of 20th Century Fox Home Entertainment. Synapse Films re-issued the film on a special edition Blu-Ray on June 11, 2019.

== Reception ==
Slaughter of the Innocents has received mixed reviews. Scott Hettrick of the Entertainment News Service deemed the film a "pleasant surprise". He granted that "[i]t's all rather predictable, but the writing, acting and elaborate location shooting are good enough to bring an increased level of appreciation for the movie." Norman Wilner of The Toronto Star called it a "surprisingly effective low-rent thriller". He added that "[w]hile the picture falls apart story-wise at exactly the one hour mark, it still packs a punch". He found Scott Glenn "pretty good" despite "his clumsy Ohio accent [being] a serious distraction." TLA Video Guide called it a "gripping FBI procedural about a serial child rapist/killer."

Joe Kane, the New York Daily News' resident genre columnist, granted that the film was "relatively lavish" and rich with "creatively grisly touches", he found the child character to be "an increasingly burdensome strain on credibility and viewer tolerance." Likewise, Charles Cassady Jr. of The Motion Picture Annual and TV Guide called the father and son duo "[not] remotely credible", and objected to the film's "caricatured fundamentalism". British magazine Shivers dismissed the film as a "Silence of the Lambs knock off" where "outrageous coincidences" negate the film's purported attention to procedural accuracy.

Several reviewers criticized James Glickenhaus' decision to cast his own son in the co-starring role. Kane called it "rather blatantly nepotistic", while TV Guide noted the film's "vanity elements" and Shivers called it "merely a vehicle for Glickenhaus to market his 11-year old son Jesse as a Macaulay Culkin clone." Robert Cettl, author of the book Serial Killer Cinema: An Analytical Filmography, posited that "[h]ad the director’s son not played [the hero's son], perhaps the film would have been better received by genre fans."
