= List of films shot in New Mexico =

The following is a list of films shot wholly or partly in New Mexico, United States.

Indian Day School, late 1890s

A Pueblo Legend, early 1910s

== Films ==
Film	Year	Locations	References
Indian Day School	1897	Isleta Pueblo	
Navajo Love Story	1908	Farmington, San Juan River	
Brothers	1911	Alamogordo	
Dude, The	1911	Cox San Augustine Ranch, near Organ	
Fools Gold	1911	Alamogordo	
Mexican Border Defenders	1911	Las Cruces	
Wages of Sin	1911	Alamogordo	
Tourists, The	1912	Albuquerque (Santa Fe Railroad Station, Alvarado Hotel/Harvey House, Barelas)	
A Pueblo Legend	1912	Albuquerque (Bosque, on the banks of the Rio Grande), Tijeras Canyon, Pueblo of Isleta	
The Grapes of Wrath	1940	Gallup, Laguna Pueblo, Santa Rosa	
Sundown	1941	Shiprock	
Flying Tigers	1942	Kirtland Air Force Base	
Ride the Pink Horse	1947	Taos, La Fonda Hotel, Santa Fe	
Ace In The Hole	1951	Manuelito, NM and AZ border, Gallup	
Salt of the Earth	1954	Grant County	
Them!	1954	Chihuahuan Desert, Alamogordo, Holloman Air Force Base	
The Man from Laramie	1955	Santa Fe	
Journey to the Center of the Earth	1959	Carlsbad Caverns National Park	
Elfego Baca: Six Gun Law (Walt Disney Presents: The Nine Lives of Elfego Baca anthology film)	1959	Cerrillos, Socorro County, and the Albuquerque–Santa Fe–Las Vegas combined statistical area	
Lonely Are the Brave	1962	Albuquerque	
The Devil's Mistress	1965	Las Cruces	
Where Angels Go, Trouble Follows	1968	Santa Fe	
Hang 'Em High	1968	Las Cruces, White Sands	
Easy Rider	1969	Navajo Nation	
The Cheyenne Social Club	1970	Santa Fe, Eaves Movie Ranch	
Gas-s-s-s	1970	Fort Bliss	
The Gatling Gun	1971	Albuquerque	
My Name Is Nobody	1973	Acoma Pueblo, Cabezon, Mogollon, San Estévan del Rey Mission Church, White Sands	
Bite the Bullet	1975	La Puente, Cumbres and Toltec Scenic Railroad, Chama, Carson National Forest, Taos, White Sands National Park	
The Man Who Fell to Earth	1976	Albuquerque, White Sands, Artesia, Fenton Lake	
Superman	1978	Gallup	
Convoy	1978	Albuquerque, Algodones, Belen, Bernalillo, Budaghers, Cerrillos, Cuba, Estancia, Madrid, Las Vegas, Placitas, White Sands National Park	
Every Which Way but Loose	1978	Albuquerque, Santa Fe, Taos	
The Muppet Movie	1979	Albuquerque	
Nightwing	1979	Albuquerque, Santa Fe, Cubero	
Kenny Rogers as The Gambler	1980	Valles Caldera	
Monster	1980	Chimayo, Santuario de Chimayo	
The Legend of the Lone Ranger	1981	Navajo Nation	
Private Lessons	1981	Albuquerque	
Second Thoughts	1983	Santa Fe	
The Prodigal Planet	1983	Santa Fe	
Silkwood	1983	Albuquerque, Los Alamos	
2010: The Year We Make Contact	1984	Very Large Array	
Red Dawn	1984	Las Vegas	
Little Treasure	1985	Santa Fe	
Silverado	1985	Cerro Pelon Ranch	
And God Created Woman	1988	New Mexico State Penitentiary, Santa Fe Plaza, Randall Davey Museum, Pecos National Historical Park, New Mexico Museum of Art	
She's Having a Baby	1988	Rio Grande Gorge Bridge	
The Milagro Beanfield War	1988	Truchas	
Young Guns	1988	Santa Fe, Los Cerrillos	
Twins	1988	Rio Grande Gorge Bridge	
Indiana Jones and the Last Crusade	1989	Cumbres and Toltec Scenic Railroad	
Begotten	1989	Santa Fe, Albuquerque	
Enid Is Sleeping	1990	Las Moscas	
Terminator 2: Judgment Day	1991	Santa Fe	
Gas Food Lodging	1992	Deming	
White Sands	1992	Rio Grande Gorge Bridge	
Lightning Jack	1994	Santa Fe	
Natural Born Killers	1994	Rio Grande Gorge Bridge	
Tank Girl	1995	White Sands	
Independence Day	1996	Plains of San Agustin	
Infinity	1996	Los Alamos National Laboratory, Los Alamos, Albuquerque	
Contact	1997	Very Large Array, Socorro	
Vampires	1998	Socorro	
The Staircase	1998	Loretto Chapel, Santa Fe, New Mexico, El Rancho de las Golondrinas	
The Hi-Lo Country	1998	Taos, Lamy, Las Vegas	
Wild Wild West	1999	Santa Fe, Cerro Pelon Ranch	
The Tao of Steve	2000	Santa Fe	
All the Pretty Horses	2000	Las Cruces	
Atomic Ed and the Black Hole	2001	Los Alamos National Laboratory	
Ghosts of Mars	2001	Socorro	
The Missing	2003	Las Cruces	
Lost in New Mexico: The Strange Tale of Susan Hero (aka 'Susan Hero')	2004	Albuquerque, Laguna Pueblo, Mountainair	
Suspect Zero	2004	Albuquerque	
Rx	2005	Albuquerque, Sunland Park	
The Longest Yard	2005	New Mexico State Penitentiary, Santa Fe	
Cruel World	2005	Albuquerque	
Rent	2005	Santa Fe	
Three Wise Guys	2005	Albuquerque	
Bordertown	2006	Albuquerque	
Beerfest	2006	Albuquerque	
Seraphim Falls	2006	Santa Fe	
Employee of the Month	2006	Albuquerque	
Wild Hogs	2007	Madrid, Albuquerque, Rio Grande Gorge Bridge	
Undead or Alive	2007	Santa Fe	
No Country for Old Men	2007	Santa Fe, Albuquerque, Las Vegas	
Transformers	2007	Holloman Air Force Base	
3:10 to Yuma	2007	Santa Fe, Abiquiú, Galisteo	
The Eye	2008	Albuquerque	
Indiana Jones and the Kingdom of the Crystal Skull	2008	Deming	
Felon	2008	New Mexico State Penitentiary, Santa Fe	
Beer for My Horses	2008	Las Vegas	
Hamlet 2	2008	West Mesa High School, Albuquerque	
Swing Vote	2008	Albuquerque, Belen	
The Burning Plain	2008	Las Cruces	
Afterwards	2008	Albuquerque, Alamogordo, Jemez Springs, Tularosa	
Appaloosa	2008	Albuquerque, Santa Fe	
The Spirit	2008	Albuquerque	
Observe and Report	2009	Winrock Shopping Center, Albuquerque	
Not Forgotten	2009	Las Cruces	
Terminator Salvation	2009	Kirtland Air Force Base, Albuquerque	
Transformers: Revenge of the Fallen	2009	Holloman Air Force Base, White Sands Missile Range	
The War Boys	2009	Albuquerque	
My One and Only	2009	Albuquerque	
Gamer	2009	Albuquerque	
Carriers	2009	Santa Fe	
Georgia O'Keeffe	2009	Santa Fe, Ghost Ranch, Abiquiú	
Dark Country	2009	Albuquerque	
Crazy Heart	2009	Albuquerque, Española, Galisteo, Santa Fe	
The Book of Eli	2010	Santa Fe	
The Spy Next Door	2010	Rio Rancho	
Legion	2010	Santa Fe	
MacGruber	2010	Albuquerque	
Deadly Impact	2010	Albuquerque	
Let Me In	2010	Albuquerque, Los Alamos	
Due Date	2010	Las Cruces	
True Grit	2010	Santa Fe	
Paul	2011	Las Cruces, Rio Grande Gorge Bridge	
Lemonade Mouth	2011	Albuquerque	
Thor	2011	Galisteo	
This Must Be the Place	2011	Bingham, Alamogordo, Carrizozo, Eagle Nest, Red River, Questa	
Cowboys & Aliens	2011	Albuquerque	
Fright Night	2011	Rio Rancho, Albuquerque, National Hispanic Cultural Center, Isleta	
10 Years	2011	Albuquerque	
Gambit	2012	Carrizozo, Galisteo, Laguna Pueblo, Los Lunas, Rio Rancho, Socorro	
Goats	2012	Albuquerque	
John Carter	2012	Four Corners	
5 Shells	2012	Santa Fe	
The Avengers	2012	Albuquerque	
Dead Man's Burden	2012	Santa Fe	
Bless Me, Ultima	2013	Albuquerque, Santa Fe University of Art and Design, Santa Fe	
The Host	2013	Santa Fe	
Odd Thomas	2013	Santa Fe, Albuquerque	
The Lone Ranger	2013	Cimarron Canyon State Park	
2 Guns	2013	Tres Cruces	
We're the Millers	2013	Albuquerque, Santa Fe, Santo Domingo, Zia Pueblos	
Frank	2014	Truth or Consequences	
The Signal	2014	Albuquerque, Los Lunas, Taos, Rio Grande Gorge Bridge	
Two Men in Town	2014	Albuquerque, Deming	
Transcendence	2014	Albuquerque, Belen	
A Million Ways to Die in the West	2014	Albuquerque, Santa Fe	
Persecuted	2014	Albuquerque	
Fort Bliss	2014	Fort Bliss	
Don't Blink	2014	Ruidoso	
Good Kill	2014	Albuquerque	
Spare Parts	2015	Albuquerque	
Dirty Weekend	2015	Albuquerque	
Sicario	2015	Albuquerque	
Big Sky	2015	Albuquerque	
Maze Runner: The Scorch Trials	2015	Albuquerque	
Lazer Team	2015	Roswell	
The Condemned 2	2015	Albuquerque, Zia Pueblo	
Whiskey Tango Foxtrot	2016	Santa Fe, Santa Fe University of Art and Design	
Batman v Superman: Dawn of Justice	2016	Deming	
In a Valley of Violence	2016	Santa Fe, Galisteo	
Hell or High Water	2016	Clovis, Portales, Tucumcari, Quay, Guadalupe	
Blood Father	2016	Albuquerque, Los Lunas	
Independence Day: Resurgence	2016	Albuquerque	
The Magnificent Seven	2016	Santa Fe	
Katie Says Goodbye	2016	Albuquerque	
Priceless	2016	Albuquerque	
Gold	2016	Albuquerque	
The Vanishing of Sidney Hall	2017	Santa Fe	
The Space Between Us	2017	Albuquerque	
Logan	2017	Albuquerque, Rio Rancho, Abiquiú, Tierra Amarilla, Chama	
Busy Day	2017	Albuquerque	
Shot Caller	2017	Albuquerque, Santa Fe	
Woman Walks Ahead	2017	Santa Fe	
Hostiles	2017	Santa Fe	
12 Strong	2018	Orogrande, Socorro, Alamogordo, White Sands National Monument	
The Long Dumb Road	2018	Albuquerque, Belen	
Ideal Home	2018	Santa Fe	
Fast Color	2018	Santa Fe	
Sicario: Day of the Soldado	2018	Albuquerque	
The Ballad of Buster Scruggs	2018	San Juan County	
Beyond the Sky	2018	Pueblo	
Deadman Standing	2018	Santa Fe	
Corporate Animals	2019	Santa Fe	
Cliffs of Freedom	2019	Albuquerque	
She's Missing	2019	Ruidoso, Albuquerque, Moriarty	
The Kid	2019	Santa Fe	
Walk. Ride. Rodeo.	2019	Albuquerque	
The Goldfinch	2019	Albuquerque	
Running with the Devil	2019	Albuquerque	
El Camino: A Breaking Bad Movie	2019	Albuquerque	
Rattlesnake	2019	Santa Fe	
Santa Fake	2019	Santa Fe	
Stargirl	2020	Albuquerque, Truth or Consequences	
Wander	2020	Carrizozo, Ruidoso	
The Comeback Trail	2020	Albuquerque	
Half Brothers	2020	Albuquerque, Santa Fe, Cedar Crest, Los Lunas, Hatch	
News of the World	2020	Santa Fe	
The Marksman	2021	Tohajiilee Indian Reservation, Albuquerque, Belen, Rio Rancho, Jemez Pueblo	
Barb and Star Go to Vista Del Mar	2021	Albuquerque	
Silk Road	2021	Albuquerque	
Walking with Herb	2021	Las Cruces	
Army of the Dead	2021	Albuquerque	
Those Who Wish Me Dead	2021	Santa Fe	
Cry Macho	2021	Albuquerque, Socorro County, Belen	
Copshop	2021	Albuquerque	
Apache Junction	2021	Albuquerque	
The Harder They Fall	2021	Santa Fe	
Holiday in Santa Fe	2021	Santa Fe	
Finch	2021	Albuquerque, Santa Fe, Shiprock, Los Lunas, Socorro, White Sands National Monument	
The Commando	2022	Albuquerque	
Vengeance	2022	Albuquerque	
Dig	2022	Albuquerque, Las Cruces, Doña Ana County	
Dead for a Dollar	2022	Santa Fe	
How to Blow Up a Pipeline	2022	Albuquerque	
Detective Knight: Rogue	2022	Las Cruces	
Slayers	2022	Albuquerque	
The Locksmith	2023	Las Cruces	
Americana	2023	Santa Fe	
Surrounded	2023	Albuquerque	
Ghosted	2023	Apache Canyon Railroad Bridge	
Robots	2023	Albuquerque	
LaRoy, Texas	2023	Albuquerque	
God Is a Bullet	2023	Albuquerque	
Dead Man's Hand	2023	Santa Fe	
Oppenheimer	2023	Santa Fe, Los Alamos, Albuquerque, Belen, Ghost Ranch	
A Really Haunted Loud House	2023	Albuquerque	
Wanted Man	2024	Las Cruces	
Love Lies Bleeding	2024	Albuquerque	
Trigger Warning	2024	Zia Pueblo	
Sunlight	2024	Albuquerque	
Rez Ball	2024	Navajo Nation	
Hold Your Breath	2024	Stanley, Santa Fe, Gallisteo	
Please Don't Feed the Children	2024	Santa Fe	
Rust	2024	Bonanza City, La Cienega	
Santa's Cousin	2024	Las Cruces	
Opus	2025	Pojoaque	
Olmo	2025	Las Cruces	
L2: Empuraan	2025	Albuquerque	
Alexander and the Terrible, Horrible, No Good, Very Bad Road Trip	2025	Albuquerque	
Eddington	2025	Estancia, Albuquerque, Truth or Consequences	
Honey Don't!	2025	Albuquerque	
The Smashing Machine	2025	Albuquerque	
The Lost Bus	2025	Ruidoso	
Xeno	2025	Albuquerque	
Protector	2025	Albuquerque	
Killing Faith	2025	Santa Fe	
Hello Out There	2025	Albuquerque, Santa Fe, Alamogordo, Roswell	
Trap House	2025	Albuquerque	
Joe's College Road Trip	2026	Las Cruces	
He Bled Neon	2026	Albuquerque	
I'll Be Gone in June	2026	Las Cruces	
Miss You, Love You	2026	Albuquerque	
Coyote vs. Acme	2026	Albuquerque	
Onslaught	2026	Albuquerque	
Angel and the Badman	2026	Santa Fe	
The Shepherd	2026	Las Cruces	
Pendulum	2027	Albuquerque	
3	TBA	Las Cruces	
A Better Place	TBA	Las Cruces	
As Deep as the Grave	TBA	Navajo Nation	
Barracuda	TBA	Las Cruces	
The Chaperones	TBA	Albuquerque	
Dirt	TBA	Albuquerque	
Flint	TBA	Santa Fe	
Fruit of the Poisonous Tree	TBA	Albuquerque	
Killer Kafé	TBA	Albuquerque	
Lone Wolf	TBA	Albuquerque	
The Ploughmen	TBA	Albuquerque	
The Stalemate	TBA	Santa Fe	
