= Mark Medoff =

American actor and writer (1940–2019)

- Born: March 18, 1940; Mount Carmel, Illinois, U.S.
- Died: April 23, 2019 (aged 79); Las Cruces, New Mexico, U.S.
- Education: University of Miami; Stanford University
- Occupations: Playwright, screenwriter, film director, theater director, actor, professor
- Spouse: Stephanie Thorne Medoff (m. 1972)
- Children: 3
- Writing career
- Notable works: Children of a Lesser God; When You Comin' Back, Red Ryder?
- Notable awards: Obie Award for Distinguished Play (1974); Tony Award for Best Play (1980); Laurence Olivier Award for Best New Play (1981)

Mark Medoff (March 18, 1940 – April 23, 2019) was an American playwright, screenwriter, film and theatre director, actor, and professor. He was associated with New Mexico State University (NMSU) in Las Cruces for more than five decades, beginning in 1966, and held the title of Distinguished Achievement Professor. During his time there, he served on the faculty of three departments, co-founded the American Southwest Theatre Company, and was a founding member of the university's Creative Media Institute. He wrote more than 30 plays, many of which premiered in Las Cruces, NM .The main theatre in NMSU's Center for the Arts, was named after him and his wife, Stephanie Medoff, in 2013.

His play Children of a Lesser God, first staged at NMSU and written for Deaf actress Phyllis Frelich, received both the Tony Award and the Laurence Olivier Award for Best Play. He was nominated for the Academy Award for Best Adapted Screenplay and the Writers Guild of America Award in the same category for the 1986 film adaptation. He also received an Obie Award for his play When You Comin' Back, Red Ryder?, which was adapted into a film with a screenplay by Medoff in 1979. His feature film Refuge was released in 2010.

== Early life and education ==
Medoff at his high school graduation, 1957

Medoff was born on March 18, 1940, in Mount Carmel, Illinois, to a Jewish family, the son of Thelma Irene (Butt), a psychologist, and Lawrence R. Medoff, a physician. Medoff stated that the family lived in a small Illinois town because his father could not find work as a Jewish doctor anywhere else. When Medoff was eight, the family moved to Miami Beach, Florida, where his father had to plead with a state official for a medical license because the quota for Jewish physicians had been filled.

At Miami Beach Senior High School, Medoff was a star athlete. In December 1956, he was a starting forward on the school's basketball team. He credited his English teacher, Pat Samuelson, for pushing him toward reading and writing. He enrolled at the University of Miami as a pre-med student and intended to follow his father into medicine. He switched to English after meeting creative writing professor, Fred Shaw, whom he called his lifelong mentor. He received his Bachelor of Arts in English in 1962. His mother graduated from the University of Miami the same year. In 1963, his short story "One Blind Mouse" was published in Prize College Stories, 1963. It was chosen from more than 500 entries in a contest sponsored by Story magazine and the Reader's Digest Foundation.

After graduating, Medoff spent two years as a supervisor of publications at the Capitol Radio Engineering Institute in Washington, D.C. He then completed a master's degree in English at Stanford University in 1966. Fred Shaw encouraged him to settle at a university and write, and suggested that he contact the head of the English department at New Mexico State University.

== Career ==
Poster for The Wager at the Upstage Theater, 1971

In 1966, Medoff joined the faculty of New Mexico State University where he first taught English. While teaching, he began writing plays. His first play, The Wager was written in 1966 and premiered at the Upstage Theater in Coconut Grove, Florida. Medoff said in 1973 that the play was first staged at the Fountain Theater in Mesilla in March 1967. The Upstage production opened on October 31, 1971, and was directed by Medoff while he was on leave from NMSU. His one-act play Doing a Good One for the Red Man which was about an encounter between a Native American man and a white couple, was performed in Las Cruces in 1969. His play The Kramer was performed at the American Conservatory Theater in San Francisco in spring 1973 and was chosen for the Mark Taper Forum's New Theater for Now festival that September. His first play to be staged in New York City was When You Comin' Back, Red Ryder?, which opened at the Circle Repertory Company on November 4, 1973, and won him the 1974 Drama Desk and Obie Awards for Outstanding New Playwright. That same year he received a Guggenheim Fellowship in playwriting.

In 1977, the Guthrie Theater produced The Conversion of Aaron Weiss at its Guthrie 2 stage in Minneapolis. Lawrence DeVine, a critic for the Detroit Free Press and a member of the American Theatre Critics Association's executive committee, nominated it as the year's best new play produced outside New York.

Medoff's big breakthrough and most famous work was Children of a Lesser God. He wrote the play for Deaf actress Phyllis Frelich, who he met in 1978, after she told him there were no meaningful roles for deaf actresses. He spent eighteen months writing it, working on the script at NMSU with Frelich and her husband,Robert Steinberg who was a set designer. Its first workshop production was staged at NMSU on April 25, 1979. It opened at the Mark Taper Forum in Los Angeles later that year, then moved to Broadway in 1980. It won the Tony and Drama Desk Awards for Best Play in 1980, as well as an Outer Critics Circle Award, and the Laurence Olivier Award for Best New Play in 1981. In 1983, the newly founded New Mexico Repertory Theatre performed the play before opening its first season, the first of several Medoff plays the company produced. A Broadway revival opened in April 2018 and ran for 54 performances. In 1981, Gallaudet College (now Gallaudet University) awarded Medoff an honorary degree for exemplary service to the Deaf community. Medoff and Frelich collaborated again on The Hands of Its Enemy which premiered at NMSU in 1984. Their later work together included Road to a Revolution, the fifth play Medoff wrote for Frelich.This play is set against the 1988 Deaf President Now protests at Gallaudet and was staged at Deaf West Theatre in 2001.

Several of Medoff's other plays were produced in New York, including The Wager, The Halloween Bandit, The Hands of Its Enemy, The Heart Outright, and The Majestic Kid. He returned to Broadway in 2004 with Prymate, which played at the Longacre Theatre. That same year his play The Same Life Over had its first production at the Northeast Theater. His later play, Marilee and Baby Lamb: The Assassination of an American Goddess, about Marilyn Monroe and her seamstress Lena Pepitone, premiered at the Rio Grande Theatre in Las Cruces. Medoff also wrote his first opera, Sara McKinnon in 2001.

Over his career, Medoff wrote, produced, or directed 19 films. His screen credits include adaptations of his plays Red Ryder and Children of a Lesser God, which he was nominated for an Oscar, BAFTA, and Writers Guild of America Award. For the film version of Children of a Lesser God, Medoff insisted that the lead role be played by a deaf actor. Marlee Matlin won the Academy Award for Best Actress for this role. His other screenplays include Clara's Heart (1988), which was adapted from the novel by Joseph Olshan, and City of Joy (1992). Medoff cast Neil Patrick Harris in his first film role in Clara's Heart after first noticing him at a week-long drama camp in Las Cruces when Harris was 12. In 2000, he produced and directed the documentary Who Fly on Angels' Wings, about a mobile pediatric unit traveling through underserved regions of southern New Mexico.The following year he directed the feature film Children on Their Birthdays, which is based on the short story by Truman Capote. In his later years, Medoff collaborated with his son-in-law, NMSU professor Ross Marks, on the films The Heart Outright (2016) which Medoff and his daughter Jessica both appeared, and Walking with Herb (2021), starring George Lopez and Edward James Olmos and filmed in Las Cruces.

== Acting and directing ==
Cast of LCCT production of Waiting for Godot at the Fountain Theatre, 1971. Mark Medoff, who played Pozzo, is second from right at the rear. Also pictured: James Sparger (Lucky), John Hadsell (Vladimir), Tom Casey (Estragon), and Frank Luz (the Boy).

Medoff worked as an actor and director throughout his career. He acted and directed in multiple plays by other writers. His theatre directing credits include Waiting for Godot, The Effect of Gamma Rays on Man-in-the-Moon Marigolds, Jacques Brel is Alive and Well and Living in Paris, One Flew Over the Cuckoo's Nest, Equus, and Hot L Baltimore. As an actor, he won a Jefferson Award for his performance as Teddy in his own play When You Comin' Back, Red Ryder? Early in his career, he played Pozzo, in a Las Cruces Community Theatre production of Waiting for Godot. He also directed the play at the Fountain Theatre. In that 1971 production, Tom Casey played Estragon and John Hadsell played Vladimir. In August 1973, he directed Jacques Brel is Alive and Well and Living in Paris for the Las Cruces Community Theatre at the Fountain Theater. He appeared in the plays Marat/Sade, Black Comedy and White Lies, and Old Times, among others. In 2015, he returned to the stage for the first time in 25 years, playing Vladimir in a production of Waiting for Godot at the Rio Grande Theatre in Las Cruces. This production was directed by his daughter Jessica. His film appearances include Red Ryder (1979), Clara's Heart (1988), Homage (1995), The Twilight of the Golds (1996), and Santa Fe (1997). He produced and directed some of his own screenplays and at times appeared in them as an actor.

== Teaching ==
Medoff was associated with New Mexico State University for more than 50 years and held the title of Distinguished Achievement Professor. He wrote that he came to New Mexico after growing disillusioned with the New York theatre world. He took the job at NMSU reluctantly but discovered that he loved teaching. He served on the faculty of three departments. He started with the English department where one of his first courses was Modern American Fiction. In 1971, he was one of four writers-in-residence at the university's newly created Creative Writing Center.

Medoff was active in Las Cruces theatre from his first years at NMSU. In May 1969, he directed the Las Cruces Community Theatre's production of Harold Pinter's The Birthday Party at the Fountain Theater in Mesilla. This production had original music by NMSU student Paul Steinberg and had an exhibit of work by local artists in the theatre’s lobby. That same year he also acted in NMSU's production of War and Peace, directed by Hershel Zohn. He played Andrei in the production, which ran at the Little Theatre through October 27. Around 1975, he directed and starred in the community theatre's production of When You Comin' Back, Red Ryder? In 1974, he received the Westafer Award which is NMSU's highest faculty honor. By 1980, the university established a Mark Medoff Scholarship Fund. After Children of a Lesser God won at the Tony Awards, Las Cruces mayor J. A. Camunez proclaimed June 15, 1980, as Mark Medoff Day in the city.

Medoff became head of NMSU's drama department in 1978, and became head of the Department of Theatre Arts in November 1984. He co-founded the American Southwest Theatre Company where he served as artistic director. He was also a founding member of the Creative Media Institute, NMSU's film program. In this program he served as creative director and taught Screenwriting and Acting for Film, Short Film Production, and Film Directing/Producing.In the program's early days, he told the faculty they had two choices.They could sit around and talk about filmmaking or they could go out and actually make movies. The American Southwest Theatre Company continues to operate as a nonprofit partner to the NMSU Theatre Arts Department. Its main stage, the Mark and Stephanie Medoff Theatre in the ASNMSU Center for the Arts, opened in 2013 and was funded by the Medoffs. His former students include novelist Denise Chávez. His family said at his death that hundreds of writers, actors, and directors considered him a mentor.

For one semester a year between 2003 and 2006 he worked at Florida State University as a Reynolds Eminent Scholar in the School of Theatre. In the spring semester of 2008, he joined the faculty of the University of Houston School of Theatre and Dance as Distinguished Lecturer. He received New Mexico's Governor's Award for Excellence in the Arts in 1980 and the Kennedy Center Medallion for Excellence in Education and Artistic Achievement in 2005, an award for practicing artists who are also career teachers. He was also named a fellow of the College of Fellows of the American Theatre.

== Controversy ==
=== Equus (1978) ===
In February 1978, Medoff, who was then a member of NMSU's English department, directed a campus production of Peter Shaffer's Equus. The play's nude scene received criticism from local clergy and District Attorney Lalo Garza. Garza threatened to have the two lead actors arrested under the state's indecent exposure law and asked university police to monitor the performance. According to an NMSU Library exhibit, Medoff warned administrators about the scene beforehand. President Gerald Thomas approved the production after he was told that the nudity would be brief and was essential to the play. Medoff sought help from the American Civil Liberties Union. At the university's request, federal judge Howard Bratton granted a temporary injunction that prevented Garza from arresting the performers and allowed the play to go forward with the nude scene. Thomas testified at the hearing that the play's directors had not broken any university rules. The production opened at the university's Little Theatre that week and sold out its run. The Dean of Arts and Sciences,Tomas Gale, described the controversy as a sign that NMSU was becoming a more sophisticated institution.

=== Prymate (2004) ===
When Prymate opened on Broadway in 2004, it caused controversy because it cast André De Shields, a Black actor, as a gorilla.

=== Debate over Children of a Lesser God ===
The 1986 film adaptation of Children of a Lesser God was praised for its casting. According to the production notes, ten of its sixteen top-billed actors were severely hearing impaired or profoundly deaf, and the filmmakers described it as the first major film to cast only hearing-impaired performers in deaf roles. However, the film received criticism from the deaf community when Paramount Pictures declined to hold a fundraising premiere for deaf audiences, despite several hundred requests for one.

When the play returned to Broadway in 2018, in a production directed by Kenny Leon and starring Lauren Ridloff and Joshua Jackson, many critics claimed that it had aged poorly. Adam Feldman of Time Out New York wrote that time had been unkind to the play. Michael Dale of BroadwayWorld suggested it was best viewed as a period piece that had helped popularize ideas that were, by today’s standard, widely accepted. Robert Hofler of TheWrap criticized the play as a two-hander( play with only two actors) where one actor does all the talking. He states that Deaf West Theatre had since found better ways to stage non-speaking actors. David Rooney of The Hollywood Reporter was more favorable to the play. He wrote that the play's focus on deaf people’s right to choose how they engage with the hearing world showed why it had been an important work in its time.

== Personal life ==
Miami Beach High School’s starting basketball team, December 1956. Left to right: Bob Marcus, Mike Sidrow, Mark Medoff, Richard Berger, and Steve Katz.

Medoff's first marriage, to Vicki Eisler, ended in divorce. In 1972, he married Stephanie Thorne, an actress and costume supervisor. They had three daughters, Jessica, Debra, and Rachel, and eight grandchildren. His son-in-law Ross Marks first met Medoff as a 20-year-old aspiring actor, and Medoff persuaded him to transfer to NMSU. The two later became business partners and fellow educators.

In 1980, the Medoffs bought a Mediterranean-style house on five acres in the Mesilla Park neighborhood of Las Cruces, where they raised their daughters and later built four additions to the house. Medoff wrote more than 30 plays there and he estimated that 300 to 400 readings of plays and films had taken place around the family's dining room table. Parts of Children on Their Birthdays and several of his other films were shot in and around the house. Phyllis Frelich was a frequent guest. Two of his daughters were married at the house as well. The living room held his father's piano and Medoff often recalled his father playing Chopin at night to put him and his brother to sleep. As Medoff's career grew, the couple considered moving to Los Angeles or New York but chose to stay in Las Cruces. "I came here by accident," Medoff said, "but we stayed by choice."

Medoff was a lifelong athlete who played golf, football, basketball, and baseball as a teenager.He described athletics as the passion of his life. He saw a connection between sports and theatre because his subject as a playwright was "mayhem in a controlled situation." He played on a championship basketball team at Miami Beach Senior High School. Fearing he'd be seen as effeminate, he kept his writing a secret during this time. He said that much of his writing came from anger that was rooted in the antisemitism he saw as a child. This included bigotry he experienced at a Jewish summer camp in Georgia and his father's struggle to get a medical license.

The Medoffs supported NMSU through the Mark and Stephanie Medoff Endowment and several other endowments. The family created the Hope E. Harrison Foundation to raise awareness and fund research on Trisomy 18, which is a chromosomal condition that affected his granddaughter Hope.

== Death ==
In his later years, Medoff was diagnosed with multiple myeloma, a type of blood cancer and developed renal failure. In April 2019, after a fall, he entered hospice care. At age 79, he died from cancer complications on April 23, 2019, at Mesilla Valley Hospice in Las Cruces, New Mexico. In lieu of flowers, his family asked for donations to the Mark Medoff Visiting Lecture Series at NMSU.

== Legacy ==
Medoff's decision to stay in Las Cruces is credited with shaping the city's arts community. His son-in-law Ross Marks said that Medoff's choice to remain there contributed to the growth of the local film industry.Medoff told KVIA in a 2018 interview that Las Cruces was "the green pasture" for his family. After his death, Marlee Matlin paid tribute to him as "the brilliant mind" behind Children of a Lesser God.

His papers, spanning 1960 to 2003 are held by the New Mexico State University Library Archives and Special Collections as the Mark Medoff papers (Ms 0453). In 2024, the exhibition Stage and Screen: 150 Years of Entertainment in the Mesilla Valley at the Branigan Cultural Center in Las Cruces featured his work. This included a poster and cast photo from his Las Cruces Community Theatre production of When You Comin' Back, Red Ryder?

== Bibliography ==
=== Plays ===
- The Wager, 1966
- The Odyssey of Jeremy Jack, (w/ Carleene Johnson, 1973)
- The Kramer, 1973
- When You Comin' Back, Red Ryder?, 1974
- The Halloween Bandit, 1978
- The Conversion of Aaron Weiss, 1978
- Firekeeper, 1978
- The Last Chance Saloon, 1979
- The Froegle Dictum, 1980
- Children of a Lesser God, 1980
- The Majestic Kid, 1981
- The Hands of Its Enemy, 1984
- Kringle's Window, 1985.
- The Heart Outright, 1986
- The Homage That Follows, 1995
- Showdown on Rio Road (with Ross Marks, 1998).
- Crunch Time, (with Phil Treon, 1998).
- Gila, 1996.
- Gunfighter - A Gulf War Chronicle, 1997
- A Christmas Carousel, 1997.
- Tommy J and Sally, 2000.
- The Same Life Over, 2002.
- Prymate, 2003.
- The Dramaturgy of Mark Medoff, 2004.
- Marilee and Baby Lamb: Assassination of an American Goddess, 2015.

=== Radio plays ===
- The Disintegration of Aaron Weiss, 1979
- The Last Chance Saloon, 1980

=== Screenplays ===
- Good Guys Wear Black, 1978
- When You Comin' Back, Red Ryder, 1979
- Off Beat, 1986
- Apology, 1986
- Children of a Lesser God, 1986
- Clara's Heart, 1987
- City of Joy, 1992
- Showdown on Rio Road, 1993
- Homage, 1995
- Santa Fe, 1997
- 100 MPG, 2006
- Refuge, 2010
- Walking with Herb, 2021

=== Acting and directing ===
Medoff's theatre directing credits include Waiting for Godot, The Effect of Gamma Rays on Man-in-the-Moon Marigolds, Jacques Brel is Alive and Well and Living in Paris, One Flew Over the Cuckoo's Nest, Equus, and Hot L Baltimore. As an actor, he has appeared in the plays Marat/Sade, Black Comedy/White Lies, and Old Times, among others, and the films The Twilight of the Golds, Santa Fe, Homage, Red Ryder, and Clara's Heart.
