= Kevin Tent =

American film editor and director

Kevin Tent is an American film editor and director. Tent has been elected to membership in the American Cinema Editors (ACE) and serves as President of the board. He is best known for his longstanding collaboration with Alexander Payne, having edited every feature film Payne has directed as of 2023. For his work on Payne's films, Tent has been nominated for two Academy Awards for Best Editing for his works in The Descendants and The Holdovers. Tent also won an ACE Eddie award for first film and received three other ACE Eddie Award nominations for Election, Sideways and About Schmidt. In addition to his career in editing, Tent also co-directed two films, Ultra Warrior (1990) and Blackbelt II (1993), and directed the 2017 film Crash Pad.

== Early life ==
Tent's early life was spent near Buffalo, New York. He began his career editing educational films, then moved into the world of low-budget horror films, working on several projects with legendary producer Roger Corman. Tent has since gone on to edit many high-profile films.

== Selected filmography ==
Year	Film	Director	Other notes
1988	Not of This Earth	Jim Wynorski	
1989	Moontrap	Robert Dyke	
1990	Basket Case 2	Frank Henenlotter	
1990	Frankenhooker	Frank Henenlotter	
1990	Hollywood Boulevard II	Steve Barnett	
1991	Guilty as Charged	Sam Irvin	
1991	Rock 'n' Roll High School Forever	Deborah Brock	
1992	Ultraviolet	Mark Griffiths	
1992	Guncrazy	Tamra Davis	
1993	Slaughter of the Innocents	James Glickenhaus	
1995	Homage	Ross Kagan Marks	
1996	Citizen Ruth	Alexander Payne	
1996	One Good Turn	Tony Randel	
1999	Election	Alexander Payne	Nominated - American Cinema Editors Award for Best Edited Feature Film – Comedy or Musical
1999	Girl, Interrupted	James Mangold	
2001	Blow	Ted Demme	
2002	About Schmidt	Alexander Payne	Nominated - American Cinema Editors Award for Best Edited Feature Film – Dramatic
2004	The Clearing	Pieter Jan Brugge	
2004	Sideways	Alexander Payne	Nominated - American Cinema Editors Award for Best Edited Feature Film – Comedy or Musical
2005	Monster-in-Law	Robert Luketic	
2006	RV	Barry Sonnenfeld	
2007	Mr. Woodcock	Craig Gillespie	
2007	The Golden Compass	Chris Weitz	
2009	Hung	Alexander Payne	Pilot episode
2009	The Goods: Live Hard, Sell Hard	Neal Brennan	
2010	Shanghai	Mikael Håfström	
2011	The Descendants	Alexander Payne	American Cinema Editors Award for Best Edited Feature Film – Dramatic; Nominated - Academy Award for Best Film Editing
2012	Disconnect	Henry-Alex Rubin	
2013	Nebraska	Alexander Payne	Nominated - American Cinema Editors Award for Best Edited Feature Film – Comedy or Musical
2014	Welcome to Me	Shira Piven	
2015	Parched	Leena Yadav	
2017	Downsizing	Alexander Payne	
2019	The Peanut Butter Falcon	Tyler Nilson; Michael Schwartz	
2019	Otherhood	Cindy Chupack	
2019	Semper Fi	Henry-Alex Rubin	
2023	The Holdovers	Alexander Payne	American Cinema Editors Award for Best Edited Feature Film – Comedy or Musical; Nominated - Academy Award for Best Film Editing
2024	Lonely Planet	Susannah Grant	

== See also ==
- List of film director and editor collaborations
