= Tom Richmond (cinematographer) =

American cinematographer (1950–2022)

- Born: Thomas Julian Richmond; January 18, 1950; Bronxville, New York, U.S.
- Died: July 29, 2022 (aged 72); New York City, New York, U.S.
- Education: University of California, Los Angeles; AFI Conservatory
- Occupation: Cinematographer
- Years active: 1974–2019

Thomas Julian Richmond, ASC (January 18, 1950 – July 29, 2022) was an American cinematographer. He was nominated for the Independent Spirit Award for Best Cinematography three times, for Stand and Deliver (1988), Pastime (1991), and Little Odessa (1994).

== Education ==
Born in Bronxville, New York, Richmond earned an undergraduate degree in photography at Harvard University and then went to graduate film school at UCLA. He also went to the American Film Institute's AFI Conservatory and graduated in 1979.

== Career ==
His first major feature film as cinematographer was Stand and Deliver (1988), and by the time he shot for A Midnight Clear (1992), he had settled into working with different directors with ease. Richmond described his experience, "All my films look different because they're not my visions; they're my reflections of the directors' visions."

He became a member of the American Society of Cinematographers (ASC) in 2012, and was also a member of the Academy of Motion Picture Arts and Sciences (AMPAS) and the International Cinematographers Guild (ICG). He taught cinematography at the New York University Tisch School of the Arts and the Brooklyn College Feirstein Graduate School of Cinema.

== Death ==
Richmond died in New York City on July 29, 2022, at the age of 72.

== Filmography ==
=== Film ===
Year	Title	Director	Notes
1984	Running Hot	Mark Griffiths	
1984	Hardbodies	Mark Griffiths	
1984	Hard Rock Zombies	Krishna Shah	
1985	Stand Alone	Alan Beattie	with Tim Suhrstedt
1985	Space Rage	Conrad E. Palmisano	with Tim Suhrstedt
1986	Chopping Mall	Jim Wynorski	
1986	The Malibu Bikini Shop	David Wechter	
1986	Hardbodies 2	Mark Griffiths	
1987	Straight to Hell	Alex Cox	
1988	Stand and Deliver	Ramón Menéndez	
1988	The Chocolate War	Keith Gordon	
1988	I'm Gonna Git You Sucka	Keenen Ivory Wayans	
1991	Pastime	Robin B. Armstrong	
1991	Heaven Is a Playground	Randall Fried	
1992	A Midnight Clear	Keith Gordon	
1992	Roadside Prophets	Abbe Wool	
1993	Killing Zoe	Roger Avary	
1994	Homage	Ross Kagan Marks	
1994	Love and a .45	C.M. Talkington	
1994	Little Odessa	James Gray	
1996	Mother Night	Keith Gordon	
1996	Johns	Scott Silver	
1997	First Love, Last Rites	Jesse Peretz	
1997	Oakland Underground	Michael A. Goorjian	
1998	Slums of Beverly Hills	Tamara Jenkins	
1998	Wild Horses	Soleil Moon Frye; Meeno Peluce	
2000	Waking the Dead	Keith Gordon	
2000	Gun Shy	Eric Blakeney	
2001	The Château	Jesse Peretz	
2001	Chelsea Walls	Ethan Hawke	
2001	Knockaround Guys	Brian Koppelman; David Levien	
2001	Hardball	Brian Robbins	
2002	I'm with Lucy	Jon Sherman	
2003	The Singing Detective	Keith Gordon	
2003	House of 1000 Corpses	Rob Zombie	with Alex Poppas
2004	Palindromes	Todd Solondz	
2006	Right at Your Door	Chris Gorak	
2006	The Ex	Jesse Peretz	
2007	Chapter 27	Jarrett Schaefer	
2008	Nick & Norah's Infinite Playlist	Peter Sollett	
2009	The Perfect Age of Rock 'n' Roll	Scott Rosenbaum	
2010	Quit	Dick Rude	
2010	All About Evil	Joshua Grannell	
2012	Should've Been Romeo	Marc Bennett	
2013	All That I Am	Carlos Puga	
2014	A Birder's Guide to Everything	Rob Meyer	
2016	Little Boxes	Rob Meyer	
2016	My Art	Laurie Simmons	

==== Documentary film ====
Year	Title	Director	Notes
1993	Curious: The Velvet Underground in Europe	Declan Lowney	
2012	Scene Missing	Alex Cox	wth Cox
2017	Ryuichi Sakamoto: Coda	Stephen Nomura Schible	with Neo Sora
2018	Ryuichi Sakamoto: async at the Park Avenue Armory	Stephen Nomura Schible	with Neo Sora

==== Short film ====
Year	Title	Director	Notes
1992	Frida Kahlo in the Casa Azul	Del Zamora	
1993	Straight to One	Ethan Hawke	
1998	Call Waiting	Michael A. Goorjian	
2002	Ethan and Alan	C.M. Talkington	
2004	Nobody's Perfect	Hank Azaria	
2006	The Need	Chris Young	
2007	The War Prayer	Michael A. Goorjian	
2010	Children of the Spider	Jeff Vespa	
2011	Michael & Javier	Marc Thomas	with Maceo Bishop
2011	Dead of Nowhere	Chris Young	
2012	Commuters	Himself	
2014	Envelopes	Nick Weiss-Richmond	
2015	Double Trouble	Stefan Roloff	
2016	Visit 57	Kate Phelan	
2017	Beast Mode	Ernest Waddell	with Chris Heinrich

=== Television ===
Year	Title	Notes
1982	Powerhouse	5 episodes
2002	The Private Detective Mike	Episode: "Woman and Man, Man and Woman"
2003	Cold Case	Episode: "Look Again"

TV movies, miniseries, and specials

Year	Title	Director
1989	Amityville 4: The Evil Escapes	Sandor Stern
1990	Nightmare on the 13th Floor	Walter Grauman
1995	Mr. Stitch	Roger Avary
1996	The Twilight of the Golds	Ross Kagan Marks
2004	Tanner on Tanner	Robert Altman
2006	Fallen	Kevin Kerslake

== Awards and nominations ==
Institution	Year	Category	Title	Result
Film Independent Spirit Awards	1988	Best Cinematography	Stand and Deliver	Nominated
Film Independent Spirit Awards	1991	Best Cinematography	Pastime	Nominated
Film Independent Spirit Awards	1994	Best Cinematography	Little Odessa	Nominated
Sundance Film Festival	2006	Excellence in Cinematography Award (Dramatic)	Right at Your Door	Won
