= The Mole (American TV series) season 7 =

The Mole
- Season 7
- Presented by: Ari Shapiro
- No. of contestants: 12
- Winner: Michael O'Brien
- Runner-up: Muna Abdulahi
- Location: Peninsular Malaysia
- The Mole: Sean Patrick Bryan
- No. of episodes: 10

Release
- Original network: Netflix
- Original release: June 28 – July 12, 2024

Season chronology
- ← Previous; Season 6

The seventh season of the American version of The Mole, which is the second instalment by Netflix, premiered on June 28, 2024. The season was produced by Eureka Productions, with Ari Shapiro as the new host, and was filmed in Malaysia during July and August 2023. The cast was revealed on Tudum on 31 May 2024.

== Format ==
Following a similar format as several versions of the franchise, twelve players are gathered to complete assignments to earn money for the group pot. However, one of the twelve is the titular "Mole", a player selected by production to secretly sabotage the assignments and cause the group to earn the least amount of money for the winner's pot as possible. Every few days, players would take a multiple choice test about the identity of the Mole and the Mole's actions over the course of last few days. Once the test is complete, the players await their results in an elimination ceremony. The player with the lowest score is eliminated from the game, while in the event of the tie the player who completed their test the slowest is eliminated. Contestants are eliminated until there are three remaining players (two genuine contestants and the Mole themself), where they must complete a final test about the identity and actions of the Mole throughout the season.

== Contestants ==
Contestant	Age	Occupation	Game Status
Michael O'Brien	30	Parking manager	Winner
Sean Patrick Bryan	42	Stay-at-home parent and retired undercover cop	The Mole
Muna Abdulahi	24	Software engineer	Runner-up
Hannah Burns	23	Marketing consultant	10th eliminated
Deanna Thompson	50	Don't F**k with Cats star	9th eliminated
Ryan Warner	33	Volleyball coach	8th eliminated
Neesh Riaz	30	Marketer	7th eliminated
Quaylyn Carter	41	Bus driver	6th / 5th eliminated
Antonio "Tony" Castellanos	24	VIP host	4th eliminated
Melissa Lummus	34	Poker player	3rd eliminated
Andy Mintzer	65	Forensic accountant	2nd eliminated
Jennifer Dasilva-Hassiman	28	Programme analyst	1st eliminated

=== Future appearances ===
In 2025, Antonio "Tony" Castellanos appeared on Battle Camp and Hannah Burns appeared on the third season of Perfect Match.

== Elimination chart ==
Color key:

Winner
The Mole
Runner-up
Earned or claimed exemption
Earned a correction
Eliminated
Won re-entry mission

	Episode 2	Episode 3	Episode 4	Episode 5	Episode 6	Episode 7	Episode 8	Episode 9		Episode 10 Final
Quiz	1	2	3	4	5	6	7	8	9	10
Total pot value	$30,000	$10,000	$60,000	$30,000	$0	$40,000	$50,000	$105,000	$129,000	$154,000
Michael	Safe	Safe	Exempt	Safe	Safe	Safe	Safe	Safe	Safe	Winner (Episode 10)
Sean	Safe	Safe	Safe	Safe	Safe	Safe	Safe	Safe	Safe	The Mole (Episode 10)
Muna	Safe	Safe	Safe	Safe	Safe	Safe	Safe	Safe	Safe	Runner-up (Episode 10)
Hannah	Safe	Exempt	Safe	Safe	Safe	Safe	Safe	Safe	Eliminated	Eliminated (Episode 9)
Deanna	Safe	Safe	Safe	Safe	Safe	Safe	Safe	Eliminated	Eliminated (Episode 9)	
Ryan	Safe	Safe	Safe	Safe	Safe	Safe	Safe	Eliminated	Eliminated (Episode 9)	
Neesh	Safe	Safe	Safe	Safe	Exempt	Safe	Eliminated	Eliminated (Episode 8)		
Quaylyn	Safe	Safe	Safe	Safe	Eliminated	Eliminated	Re-eliminated (Episode 7)			
Tony	Safe	Safe	Safe	Eliminated	Eliminated (Episode 5)					
Melissa	Safe	Safe	Eliminated	Eliminated (Episode 4)						
Andy	Safe	Eliminated	Eliminated (Episode 3)							
Jennifer	Eliminated	Eliminated (Episode 2)								
Advantages	Muna (Correction)	Hannah (Exemption)	Michael (Exemption)	(none)	Neesh (Exemption)	(none)	Not earned	Not earned	(none)	
Eliminated	Jennifer; Lowest score	Andy; Lowest score	Melissa; Lowest score	Tony; Lowest score	Quaylyn; Lowest score	Quaylyn; Won re-entry into game	Neesh; Lowest score	Ryan; First elimination	Hannah; Lowest score	Sean; The Mole
Eliminated	Jennifer; Lowest score	Andy; Lowest score	Melissa; Lowest score	Tony; Lowest score	Quaylyn; Lowest score	Quaylyn; Won re-entry into game	Neesh; Lowest score	Ryan; First elimination	Hannah; Lowest score	Muna; Lowest score
Eliminated	Jennifer; Lowest score	Andy; Lowest score	Melissa; Lowest score	Tony; Lowest score	Quaylyn; Lowest score	Quaylyn; Lowest score	Neesh; Lowest score	Deanna; Second elimination	Hannah; Lowest score	
Eliminated	Jennifer; Lowest score	Andy; Lowest score	Melissa; Lowest score	Tony; Lowest score	Quaylyn; Lowest score	Quaylyn; Lowest score	Neesh; Lowest score	Deanna; Second elimination	Hannah; Lowest score	Michael; Highest score

== Episodes ==
Episode	Airdate	Title	Amount in Pot (Note: Pot earnings: indicates an increase indicates no change indicates a decrease) (Note: Includes totals of missions where results were revealed in the next episode.)	Location	Eliminated	
1	June 28, 2024	"Nobody's Safe"	$0 → $30,000	West Malaysia	—N/a	
2	June 28, 2024	"Treasure Island"	$30,000 → $10,000	Tioman Island	Jennifer	
3	June 28, 2024	"Money Tower"	$10,000 → $60,000	Forest City	Andy	
4	June 28, 2024	"Powers of Observation"	$60,000 → $30,000	Kuala Lumpur	Melissa	
5	June 28, 2024	"Special Delivery"	$30,000 → $0	Port Klang	Tony	
6	July 5, 2024	"Cave Raid"	$0 → $40,000	Gopeng	Quaylyn (Note: Quaylyn was eliminated after scoring the lowest in the quiz, but subsequently won re-entry into the game during the same episode.)	
7	July 5, 2024	"Beat the Bomb"	$40,000 → $50,000	Ipoh and Papan	Quaylyn	
8	July 5, 2024	"Taken"	$50,000 → $105,000	George Town	Neesh	
9	July 12, 2024	"Night at the Museum"	$105,000 → $129,000	George Town	Ryan	
9	July 12, 2024	"Night at the Museum"	$105,000 → $129,000	George Town	Deanna	
9	July 12, 2024	"Night at the Museum"	$105,000 → $129,000	George Town	Hannah	
10	July 12, 2024	"Who Is the Mole?"	$129,000 → $154,000	George Town	Runner-up	Muna
10	July 12, 2024	"Who Is the Mole?"	$129,000 → $154,000	George Town	Winner	Michael
10	July 12, 2024	"Who Is the Mole?"	$129,000 → $154,000	George Town	The Mole	Sean

== Season summary ==
Missions are listed in this section in chronological order.

=== Episode 1 ===
Episode 1Original airdate: June 28, 2024Location: West Malaysia
Mission	Money earned	Possible earnings
Intruder Mission	$30,000	$30,000
Phone Booth Mission (Note: The result of the mission was revealed at the start of the next episode.)	$0	$5,000
Current Pot	$30,000	$35,000

Advantages earned
Muna	Correction for Quiz 1 (earned in the Phone Booth Mission)

Intruder Mission

After the 12 contestants meet for the first time, it is announced that five "intruders," applicants who missed out on being selected for the season, will attempt to cross an assault course within 30 minutes to earn a place on the season. For the mission, the contestants must fire paintballs at intruders crossing the course, eliminating any intruders they hit. If the group hit all five intruders, $20,000 is earned for the pot. However, the first intruder (if any) to enter a car at the end of the course earns a place on the season, replacing one of the current 12 contestants.

Before the intruders run the course, the group have five minutes to select a leader to coordinate the mission. If an intruder reaches the end of the assault course, the leader's place on the season is taken by the successful intruder. The group earns a bonus $10,000 if they select a leader within five minutes, otherwise a leader is chosen randomly with no money earned. The group selected Neesh as the leader within the time-limit, earning $10,000 for the pot.

To cross the course, intruders must solve a clue to unlock themselves from a chain, then cross the three Zones without getting hit. At Zone 1, the intruders must cross a series of obstacles while four contestants use two slingshots to fire paintballs at them. At Zone 2, the intruders, now armed with smoke bombs and shields, must collect a key from the top of a tower before proceeding to the next zone. Meanwhile, four contestants swivel a platform to aim the paintball gun mounted to it and fire at the intruders. At Zone 3, the intruders must cross a series of obstacles while three group members use a paintball gun, loaded with only 10 paintballs each, to fire at them. Nearby is also a screen with a birds-eye-view of the course where one contestant can communicate information to others via walkie talkie.

The group successfully eliminated all five intruders, earning $20,000 on top of the $10,000 earned by choosing a team leader.

Phone Booth Mission

The group must select the three contestants they deem to be the "most trustworthy," who each privately receive an offer from host Ari Shapiro via phone. They can either dial "1" on the phone to potentially add $5,000 to the pot, or to dial "2" to earn a Correction, an advantage which corrects an incorrect answer on their next quiz. If all three selected contestants dial "1," $5,000 is added to the pot. Otherwise, the contestant(s) who choose the Correction earns it for themselves.

Deanna, Muna and Tony were selected as the most trustworthy contestants. Deanna and Tony dialled "1" while Muna dialled "2" meaning she received a Correction for the quiz and no money was earned.

=== Episode 2 ===
Episode 2
Original airdate: June 28, 2024 Location: Tioman Island
Mission	Money earned	Possible earnings
Quiz 1 & Elimination
Buried Treasure Mission	$15,000	$15,000
Countdown Mission	−$35,000	$0
Current Pot	$10,000	$50,000
Advantages earned
Hannah	Exemption for Quiz 2 (earned in the Countdown Mission)	
Elimination
Jennifer	1st player eliminated	

Buried Treasure Mission

The group have two hours to use a map to find a clue leading them to two treasure chests on Tioman Island and build a raft to transport the chests to a buoy offshore.

The group can find each half of the clue at two locations on the map: "Smashing Rock" and a shipwreck. At Smashing Rock, contestants must figure out that they must follow numbered rocks to find their half of the clue in a hanging cargo net. At the shipwreck, contestants must dive to collect a first aid kit from a sunken ship and collect their half of the clue inside.

After combining both halves of the clue, the group must figure out that it requires them to fold the map to reveal an "X" where the chests are buried. After finding the treasure chests, the group must then transport them to a buoy using a raft which they must assemble using items along the beach. If they bring the treasure to the buoy within two hours, $15,000 is added to the pot.

The group successfully transported both chests to the buoy within two hours, earning $15,000 for the pot.

Countdown Mission

While recreating at a bar, it is revealed that one contestant has the chance to win an Exemption (immunity from the next Quiz). During the mission, the value of the pot at the time ($45,000) is displayed on a screen begins to depreciate. The pot only stops losing money when only one player remains in the room. However, the last player remaining in the room also receives the Exemption for the next quiz.

Hannah was the last contestant remaining and received the Exemption. The pot's value depreciated to $9,870, which host Ari Shapiro rounded to $10,000, meaning that overall $35,000 was removed from the pot.

=== Episode 3 ===
Episode 3
Original airdate: June 28, 2024 Location: Forest City
Mission	Money earned	Possible earnings
Quiz 2 & Elimination
Tower Heist Mission	$5,000	$20,000
Fortune Mission	$45,000	$50,000
Current Pot	$60,000	$120,000
Advantages earned
Michael	Exemption for Quiz 3 (earned in the Fortune Mission)	
Elimination
Andy	2nd player eliminated	

Tower Heist Mission

Contestants travel in two cars, which form their group for the assignment, to an apartment complex in Forest City. Each group elect a leader who is "most capable of performing under pressure".

Upon arrival, each group has one hour to complete a "heist" by entering a specific apartment, unlocking a safe and "stealing" the jewellery inside. For each group that successfully opens their safe and steals the jewellery, $10,000 is added to the pot.

To do so, each group leader must rappel down the side of the building to their group's designated apartment, distinguished with a red chair on the balcony. After finding the apartment, they must enter through the balcony and open the front door for their remaining group members to enter with a bag of supplies. Afterwards, each group must search their apartment for the safe, determine the combination to unlock it and steal the jewellery inside. To determine the code, groups must figure out that they must input batteries from the apartment into a UV flashlight in their supply bag, then use the UV flashlight to find two numbers on household items which illuminate when shone upon. These numbers form the four-digit code to the safe, and teams only have three attempts to input the correct code. Inside each apartment is also a clue which groups can open at the cost of $5,000.

One group opened their safe within the time limit, however one clue was also opened, meaning that in total $5,000 was earned for the pot.

Fortune Mission

Each contestant chooses one fortune cookie at random to open secretly. Five fortune cookies contain varying amounts of money ($50,000 in total) while the other five contain an Exemption slip.

Each round, the group must discuss and vote for one contestant to eliminate from the mission. This process repeats until only five contestants remain. Each contestant who was not voted out then reveals the contents of their fortune cookie. If their fortune cookie contains money, the money is added to the pot. However, if the cookie contains an Exemption, that contestant receives an Exemption for the upcoming quiz.

Hannah, Michael, Neesh, Quaylyn and Tony remained by the end of the mission. Michael had an Exemption, earning it for himself for the next quiz, while the other four contestants had fortune cookies containing money, with a combined value of $45,000, which was added to the pot.

=== Episode 4 ===
Episode 4
Original airdate: June 28, 2024 Location: Kuala Lumpur
Mission	Money earned	Possible earnings
Quiz 3 & Elimination
Movie Night Mission	−$40,000	$25,000
Gala Mission	$10,000	$30,000
Current Pot	$30,000	$175,000
Elimination
Melissa	3rd player eliminated	

Movie Night Mission

Before the season began, each contestant filmed a casting interview talking about their strategy if they were to be selected as the Mole. For the mission, each contestant is privately given the chance to watch another contestant's interview, at the cost of $5,000 from the pot. If all contestants decline the option to watch an interview, the group earns $25,000 for the pot.

Eight contestants watched an interview, deducting $40,000 from the pot.

Gala Mission

As waitstaff, the group attends a gala at the Petronas Twin Towers where three out of sixty guests (an artist, a doctor and a pilot) have brought a cash donation of $10,000 each, while the remaining guests brought other gifts. The group has one hour to determine which three guests brought the cash to earn the money. For the mission, the group must select four members to be at the back of house and five members to attend to guests at the front of house.

The contestants at the back of house are given photos of each guest, their table number, access to their belongings in the cloakroom, and RSVP cards detailing guests' dietary requirements and gift/donation choices. The contestants at the front of house must serve food and beverages to the guests to determine which guests do not match the dietary criteria of those who brought cash and communicate the information to the back of house team so they can eliminate the incorrect guests. Additionally, the front of house team can identify guests' cloak tag numbers for the back of house team to match with their belongings in the cloakroom to identify guests who match the occupations of the three who brought money. For each guest who brought a cash donation correctly identified by the team at the back of house, $10,000 is added to the pot.

One guest was correctly identified, earning $10,000 for the pot.

=== Episode 5 ===
Episode 5
Original airdate: June 28, 2024 Location: Port Klang
Mission	Money earned	Possible earnings
Quiz 4 & Elimination
Money Shipping Mission	$19,500	$100,000
Advantage Auction Mission	−$49,500	$15,000
Current Pot	$0	$290,000
Advantages earned
Neesh	Exemption for Quiz 5 (earned in the Advantage Auction Mission)	
Elimination
Tony	4th player eliminated	

Money Shipping Mission

Contestants have 60 minutes to search the North West Shipping Depot for U.S. shipping containers containing boxes worth varying amounts of money, which add up $50,000 in total. They must then divide the boxes between three trucks, each labelled with the name of a contestant (Michael, Muna and Sean), in any way they wish. However, only boxes loaded into the truck labelled with the contestant most selected as the Mole during the previous quiz add money to the pot. Additionally, inside one shipping container is a "Doubler" box which doubles the earnings of the truck it's loaded in, if that truck is correct.

After the mission, it was revealed that Michael was most selected as the Mole during the last quiz, adding the $19,500 from his truck into the pot.

Advantage Auction Mission

Contestants take part in an auction, bidding money from the pot, for three advantages: (1) 15 minutes to read another contestant's dossier, (2) a Correction for the next quiz and (3) an Exemption. Each contestant may only bid for one advantage, with the highest bidder claiming the item. For each advantage not bid for, $5,000 is added to the pot.

The first two advantages were not bid for. Neesh bid $59,500 (the entire pot at the time, including the $10,000 earned from the first two advantages) for the Exemption, claiming it for himself and meaning that overall $49,500 was removed from the pot for the assignment.

=== Episode 6 ===
Episode 6
Original airdate: July 5, 2024 Location: Gopeng
Mission	Money earned	Possible earnings
Quiz 5 & Elimination
Re-Entry Mission	$20,000	$20,000
Cave Raid Mission	$20,000	$40,000
Current Pot	$40,000	$350,000
Elimination
Quaylyn	5th player eliminated (subsequently won re-entry into the game)	

Re-Entry Mission

Following his elimination after Quiz 5, each contestant is given the chance to privately vote on whether they want Quaylyn return to the game, with $20,000 on offer if he returns. Unbeknownst to the contestants, Quaylyn's potential return would not be decided by a majority vote. Instead, after the votes are cast, Quaylyn is given five minutes to guess how many contestants voted for him to return. If Quaylyn guesses correctly, he returns to the game and adds $20,000 to the pot; otherwise, he remains eliminated and no money is earned.

Quaylyn correctly guessed that three out of seven contestants voted for him to return, which awarded him a place back in the game and earned $20,000 for the pot.

Cave Raid Mission

Contestants divide themselves into a "River" and "Rope" group for the mission. Each group has 60 minutes to navigate through their assigned cave system (a confined cave along an underwater river, or a steep descending cave) to reach a chamber at the end which contains three fake idols and one idol worth $20,000. Along each cave are three "puzzle chambers" where groups have 90 seconds to solve a puzzle to earn a stone totem, which eliminates an incorrect idol from the final chamber. Upon reaching the final chamber, groups can use their totems to eliminate incorrect idols before choosing an idol to leave the cave with. For each group that leaves the cave with the correct idol, $20,000 is added to the pot.

One group selected the correct idol, earning $20,000 for the pot.

=== Episode 7 ===
Episode 7
Original airdate: July 5, 2024 Location: Ipoh and Papan
Mission	Money earned	Possible earnings
Quiz 6 & Elimination
Money Bomb Mission	$10,000	$30,000
Negotiation Mission	$0	$50,000
Current Pot	$50,000	$430,000
Elimination
Quaylyn	5th player eliminated	

Money Bomb Mission

Contestants divide themselves into three groups, with each group responsible for defusing a bomb within 60 minutes.

To do so, groups must first figure out how to measure exactly six kilograms (13 lb) of tin using a conversion chart between various measurement units, a 4-litre (1.1 US gal) and 9-litre (2.4 US gal) jug of water, and a balance scale. Each group can also open a clue for this part of the mission at the cost of $5,000 from their earnings.

Afterwards, groups must place the measured tin on a scale to open the bomb's detonator before cutting one of two colored wires inside, only one of which defuses the bomb. Each group's wire they must cut is a different color, so teams must walkie-talkies inside the detonator to communicate and figure out their correct wires. For each bomb defused, $10,000 is added to the pot.

One group successfully defused their bomb, earning $10,000 for the pot.

Negotiation Mission

Contestants travel in two cars, which form their group for the mission, to the town of Papan. There, each group must select their "best negotiator" for the mission. Each negotiator is given the dilemma of selecting $50,000 for the pot or Exemptions for their entire group for the next quiz. If both negotiators select the $50,000, the money is added to the pot. If one negotiator selects the $50,000 and the other selects the Exemption, no money is earned and the negotiator who selected the Exemptions wins them for their group. If both negotiators select the Exemption, no money or Exemptions are earned. Before making their decision, the negotiators are given time to discuss with each other, as well as with their respective groups.

Both group's negotiators, Muna and Sean, selected the Exemptions. Therefore, no money was added to the pot and no Exemptions were earned.

=== Episode 8 ===
Episode 8
Original airdate: July 5, 2024 Location: George Town
Mission	Money earned	Possible earnings
Quiz 7 & Elimination
Search and Rescue Mission	$35,000	$50,000
Item Basket Mission	$20,000	$20,000
Current Pot	$105,000	$500,000
Elimination
Neesh	6th player eliminated	

Search and Rescue Mission

Early in the morning, Deanna and Ryan were randomly selected to be taken from their hotel to an unknown destination in Penang, a temple on a jetty; there, they are chained to the floor. During breakfast, it is announced to the rest of the group that they must find and free Deanna and Ryan within two hours to earn up to $50,000 for the pot.

The group are given a phone and a map. They can make 15-second phone calls to Deanna and Ryan for information about their location, at the cost of $5,000 per call. Upon reaching the gate of the jetty leading to the temple, the group find a sign instructing them to collect keys to unlock the gate and the temple doors from a nearby address. If the group manage to unlock the temple doors to free Deanna and Ryan, up to $50,000 is added to the pot, depending on the number of phone calls made.

During the mission, Deanna and Ryan must use provided items to reach a distant set of keys to unlock themselves from the chain, while also answering any phone calls from the rest of the group to provide them with information.

The group successfully released Deanna and Ryan in time, but made three phone calls during the mission, meaning that $35,000 was earned for the pot.

Item Basket Mission

The group must select one player to attend a special lunch; they selected Hannah. There, Hannah is presented with five steamer baskets arranged by the Mole, each containing a specific item: (1) $1,000 for the pot; (2) $20,000 for the pot; (3) a Correction; (4) an Exemption; and (5) a "game over." Hannah is given the chance to open baskets one at a time. She can either end the mission and keep the contents of the opened basket, or reject it and open another basket instead. However, if she opens the "game over" basket, the mission automatically ends and all items are forfeited. During the mission, host Ari Shapiro also presents potentially misleading statements from the Mole about the contents of certain baskets.

Hannah opened the basket containing $20,000 and decided to end the mission there, adding the money to the pot.

=== Episode 9 ===
Episode 9
Original airdate: July 12, 2024 Location: George Town
Mission	Money earned	Possible earnings
Quiz 8 & Double Elimination
Museum Heist Mission	$24,000	$60,000
Quiz 9 & Elimination
Current Pot	$129,000	$560,000
Elimination
Ryan	7th player eliminated	
Deanna	8th player eliminated	
Hannah	9th player eliminated	

Museum Heist Mission

The group have one hour to "break in" to the Penang City Hall to reach an art exhibition which contains two authentic artefacts among dozens of forgeries, surrounded by a security system. There, they must identify and collect the two authentic artefacts, with each correct artefact adding $30,000 for the pot.

The group must figure out that the correct artefacts are marked with a stamp matching a symbol of a monkey on a nearby painting. Then, one group member is suspended in a pulley system above the exhibition while the remaining three group members must operate ropes to maneuver the pulley so they can collect the correct artefacts without setting off the security system. Each time an artefact is dropped or knocked over, the security system activates and $2,000 is lost from the total earnings, and the mission automatically ends if the system activates three times.

After collecting one authentic artefact, the group knocked over three other artefacts, ending the mission and meaning that $24,000 was earned for the pot.

=== Episode 10 ===
Episode 10
Original airdate: July 12, 2024 Location: George Town
Mission	Money earned	Possible earnings
End of the Road Mission	$25,000	$50,000
Final Pot	$154,000	$610,000
Winner
Michael
The Mole
Sean
Runner-up
Muna

End of the Road Mission

The group have 30 minutes to cross three "mined" grid zones along a road without stepping on any live "mines" to earn money. The first grid is worth $10,000, the second grid is worth $15,000 and the third grid is worth $25,000. Before crossing each grid, the group have 20 seconds to memorize a map of the safe path, and the money for a grid is lost if they step on a live mine while crossing.

The group successfully crossed the third grid, earning $25,000 for the pot and bringing the final pot to $154,000.

== Mole activity ==
As the Mole, Sean was briefed about missions beforehand. The following acts of Mole activity were revealed in the finale or in Sean's post-season interviews:

- Intruder Mission: While firing the slingshots, Sean missed all of the intruders crossing the zone.
- Buried Treasure Mission: As one of the contestants tasked with assembling the raft, Sean cut the rope into lengths which were too short to properly tie knots and also punctured holes in the wood during the mission.
- Tower Heist Mission: As a nominated group leader tasked with rappelling down the tower, Sean feigned having a fear of heights to reduce any suspicion on him during the rappel. Later, he also read out numbers on items which were not relevant in finding the code for the safe, hid several batteries from the apartment in his boot, and pressed incorrect buttons on the safe before the rest of his group attempted to enter the code.
- Movie Night Mission: In his casting interview which several contestants watched, Sean revealed that he was formerly an undercover cop (a fact he did not mention when introducing himself), in hopes that other contestants would believe that an undercover cop would not be selected as the Mole.
- Gala Mission: While in the back of house team, Sean replaced one of the guests' photos. Additionally, knowing that Michael suspected him of being the Mole at the time, Sean switched another photo right in front of Michael to try and mislead him.
- Money Shipping Mission: Sean pushed for the Doubler box to be placed in Muna's truck, which ended up being the incorrect one.
- Advantage Auction Mission: Before the advantages were revealed, Sean announced that he would bid for an Exemption if it came up, in order to encourage a "bidding war" among the other contestants.
- Money Bomb Mission: Sean suggested for his group to open the clue (although they ended up not doing so).
- Museum Heist Mission: While operating the pulley, Sean abruptly pulled a rope which resulted in an artefact being knocked over. He also pulled the ropes in the opposite way that Hannah and Muna were to ensure that the pulley would not move.
- End of the Road Mission: Sean stepped on a live mine in one of the grids, losing the money of that zone.

== Hidden clues ==
The following hidden clues were revealed by Netflix.

- Buried Treasure Mission: The name of the ship at the shipwreck was the Padang Rumput, which translates to "the meadows" in Malay. "The meadows" is also the meaning of "Las Vegas" (Sean's hometown) translated from Spanish.
- Countdown Mission: The beachside bar where the mission took place had a sign warning about jellyfish which displayed the words "Sting Warning". These words were also a reference to Sean's (former) occupation as an undercover cop.
- Tower Heist Mission: One of the items around the apartment were poker chips from Las Vegas, a reference to Sean's hometown.
- Money Bomb Mission: The balance scales which groups used to compare weights were a reference to Sean's zodiac sign: Libra.
- Museum Heist Mission: One of the fake artefacts at the exhibition was a sculpture of two hands. It was revealed that these were actually a sculpture of Sean's hands, including his broken knuckle, which he had cast before the mission. Additionally, the symbol which contestants had to find to distinguish between artefacts was of a monkey, which is also Sean's Chinese zodiac sign.
