= When You Comin' Back, Red Ryder? =

Play by Mark Medoff

- Original language: English
- Written by: Mark Medoff
- Characters: Stephen 'Red' Ryder; Angel Childress; Teddy; Clarisse Ethridge; Richard Ethridge; Tommy Clark; Lyle Striker; Cheryl
- Genre: Drama
- Setting: Foster's Diner, New Mexico

Premiere
- Date: 1974

When You Comin' Back, Red Ryder? is a play by Mark Medoff.

The setting is Foster's Diner, a New Mexico rest stop that lost most of its clientele when a new highway bypass opened. Employees include restless cook Stephen (nicknamed "Red Ryder"), mousy waitress Angel, and their no-nonsense boss Clark. Lyle, owner of the adjacent filling station, stops in on occasion to break the monotony with his cheery banter. The boring routine of the daily grind is disrupted with the arrival of two couples, the upscale Richard and Clarisse, and the younger and wilder Teddy, an unbalanced Vietnam War vet, and Cheryl, his hippie girlfriend. Complications arise when illegal drugs and guns enter the picture, and Teddy resorts to physical, mental, and emotional torture when he holds everyone hostage.

== Summary ==
The story starts out in a neat but rundown little diner just off the highway in the middle of nowhere, New Mexico. The protagonist, Stephen "Red" Ryder, is sitting at the counter after finishing his shift. He is smoking a cigarette and drinking coffee from a paper cup. Angel enters to start her shift. Red and Angel discuss various subjects including Angel's bumpy relationship with her mother, Red's aspirations of getting out of town, and how they'd both like to tell off their boss, Clark. Red claims he can't leave town as of yet since his stepfather has just left his mother. Lyle, the gas station attendant across the street, enters and offers to lend Red some money so he can buy a car to leave town. Red rejects the offer, haughtily. Richard and Clarisse, a white collar couple who are clearly not from these parts, enter and take a seat at the counter. Lyle leaves to help fill their car. Richard emphasizes that Clarisse is a classical violinist and talks about subjects well out of the realm of understanding for the local folk, much to Clarisse's discomfort. Teddy, a foreboding man dressed in fatigues, and his much younger girlfriend, Cheryl, enter and tell everyone their car needs a new part. Lyle offers to take a look but Teddy insists he not look in the trunk. Teddy states they're on their way to Mexico while taking on an obvious and badly-mimicked southern accent which comes and goes. He comes off as incredibly abrasive as he orders his food and makes small talk, prodding Angel, Red and Richard with increasingly uncomfortable questions, and his threats are often veiled by a joking manner. Richard, put off by Teddy, hurries Clarisse out only to return moments later because their keys are missing. Lyle approaches Teddy and admits he saw what was in his trunk (suggesting smuggled drugs). Teddy tells him he shouldn't have done that and Lyle agrees, but suggests that if Teddy were to have taken Richard's keys it would be a bad move since no one here wants any trouble. He pushes him to just take Cheryl and leave. Instead, Richard begins accusing Teddy of stealing his keys outright which Teddy answers by pulling out a gun. Teddy demands they empty the register and tells Richard to give him Clarisse's violin as well. Richard refuses and tells Teddy he'll just have to shoot him. The stage goes black as Teddy fires.

Act two begins with the diner attendees tending to Richard's flesh wound. He's only been grazed in the arm. Teddy admonishes Red and Lyle for staring at Cheryl's breasts. He gives her his keys and tells her to follow Lyle to the car with the gun and make sure he repairs the car. In the meantime, Teddy begins to question the moral fiber of everyone there. He can see Clarisse and Richard's marriage is on the rocks and asks if she's happy with her husband parading her around and demanding she perform. Richard protests but makes no move to silence Teddy. Teddy then moves on to Angel, suggesting that her weight and lack of smarts will land her in the same spot for the rest of her life; unmarried and spending her evenings watching TV with Lyle. When Red protests, Teddy attacks his spinelessness. He pokes fun at Red for sporting 1950s greaser garb and "Born Dead" tattoo and suggests if he were a real man he would've gotten a tattoo with a girl's name on it and been out of this town a while ago. Teddy even becomes enraged at Red's self-appointed nickname, insisting that the real Red Rider would've knocked him flat. He then begins a series of demands for the others to reenact a scene from a cowboy TV show, which gets more and more uncomfortable. He threatens Red with violence if he doesn't pretend to ride around on a horse, "slap leather", and kiss his "best gal", (played by Angel), on the lips. Teddy even goes so far to demonstrate what a real kiss is on Clarisse, in front of a helpless Richard. Lyle comes back with Cheryl to let Teddy know the car is fixed. When Teddy suggests Red have sex with Angel, the others protest. Instead, Teddy insists they all dance along to the jukebox, forcing them to occasionally change partners. Teddy himself starts to dance which turns into a frenzy as he rips open Clarisse's shirt and roughly shoves her in front of the men, suggesting they ogle her like they previously did to Cheryl. Red attacks him only to be taken down immediately. Teddy tells Red to tape everyone's hand and wrists. He steals the money from Richards wallet before he leaves, but Cheryl is now seriously hesitating to follow him out. Teddy leaves without her. A little while later, Clark, the diner owner enters, frees the others, and tells Richard to call the police while he keeps Cheryl from running. He demands to know why Red let his diner get robbed. Red finally tells him off before accepting Lyle's loan and hitching a ride with Richard and Clarisse to leave the diner, and the town, for good. Lyle asks Angel if she'll be over to watch TV tonight and she says she should stay home and make amends with her mom. The play closes with her resuming her duties behind the counter.

== Characters ==
- Stephen 'Red' Ryder
- Angel Childress
- Teddy
- Clarisse Ethridge
- Richard Ethridge
- Tommy Clark
- Lyle Striker
- Cheryl

== Productions ==
The first of Medoff's plays to receive a New York City staging, it opened on November 4, 1973 at the Circle Repertory Company and played 26 performances, before producer Elliot Martin transferred it on December 6 to off-Broadway's Eastside Playhouse, where it ran for 302 performances. The cast, directed by Kenneth Frankel, included Kevin Conway and Brad Dourif.

Medoff won an Obie Award for Distinguished Play in 1974.

In May 2009 the play received an off-off-Broadway revival from Retro Productions.

== Film ==
The 1979 film version of When You Comin' Back, Red Ryder?, adapted by Medoff and directed by Milton Katselas, starred Marjoe Gortner, Candy Clark, Stephanie Faracy, Lee Grant, Hal Linden, Peter Firth, Pat Hingle, Audra Lindley, and Anne Ramsey.
