= Round Mountain (Grand County, Utah) =

Mountain in Grand County, Utah, United States

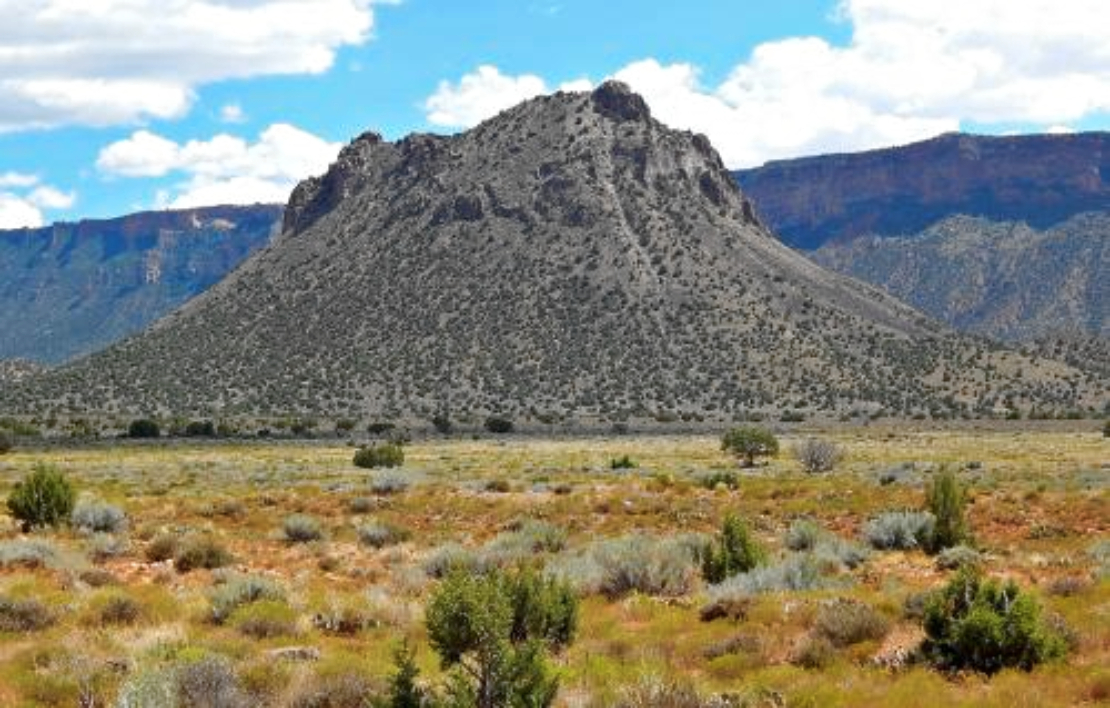
- Round Mountain, north aspect

Highest point
- Elevation: 6,185 ft (1,885 m)
- Prominence: 705 ft (215 m)
- Parent peak: Horse Mountain
- Isolation: 2.65 mi (4.26 km)
- Listing: Mountains of Utah
- Coordinates: 38°36′46″N 109°21′43″W

Geography
- Location within Utah Location within the United States
- Location: Grand County, Utah; United States
- Parent range: Colorado Plateau; La Sal Mountains
- Topo map: USGS Warner Lake

Geology
- Rock type: Gray hornblende plagioclase trachyte

Climbing
- Easiest route: class 2

Round Mountain is a small 6,185-foot (1,885 m) summit in southeastern Grand County, Utah, United States. It is located near the upper end of Castle Valley, Utah, about 10 miles (16 km) east-northeast of Moab. It rises 1,000 feet (305 m) above the valley floor in 0.4 miles (0.64 km). Precipitation runoff from the mountain drains into Castle Creek, which is a tributary of the Colorado River. The nearest higher peak is Castleton Tower, 1.42 miles (2.29 km) to the north.

== Geology ==
Round Mountain is made of gray hornblende plagioclase trachyte. It is sometimes called an extinct bysmalith, or igneous volcanic plug, but is more widely considered a shallow intrusion (laccolith) related to the La Sal Mountains immediately north.

== Climate ==
Spring and fall are the most favorable seasons to visit Round Mountain. According to the Köppen climate classification system, it is located in a cold semi-arid climate zone with cold winters and hot summers. Summers highs rarely exceed 100 °F (38 °C). Summer nights are comfortably cool, and temperatures drop quickly after sunset. Winters are cold, but daytime highs are usually above freezing. Winter temperatures below 0 °F (−18 °C) are uncommon, though possible. This desert climate receives less than 10 inches (250 millimeters) of annual rainfall, and snowfall is generally light during the winter.
