= Ari Shapiro =

American radio broadcaster (born 1978)

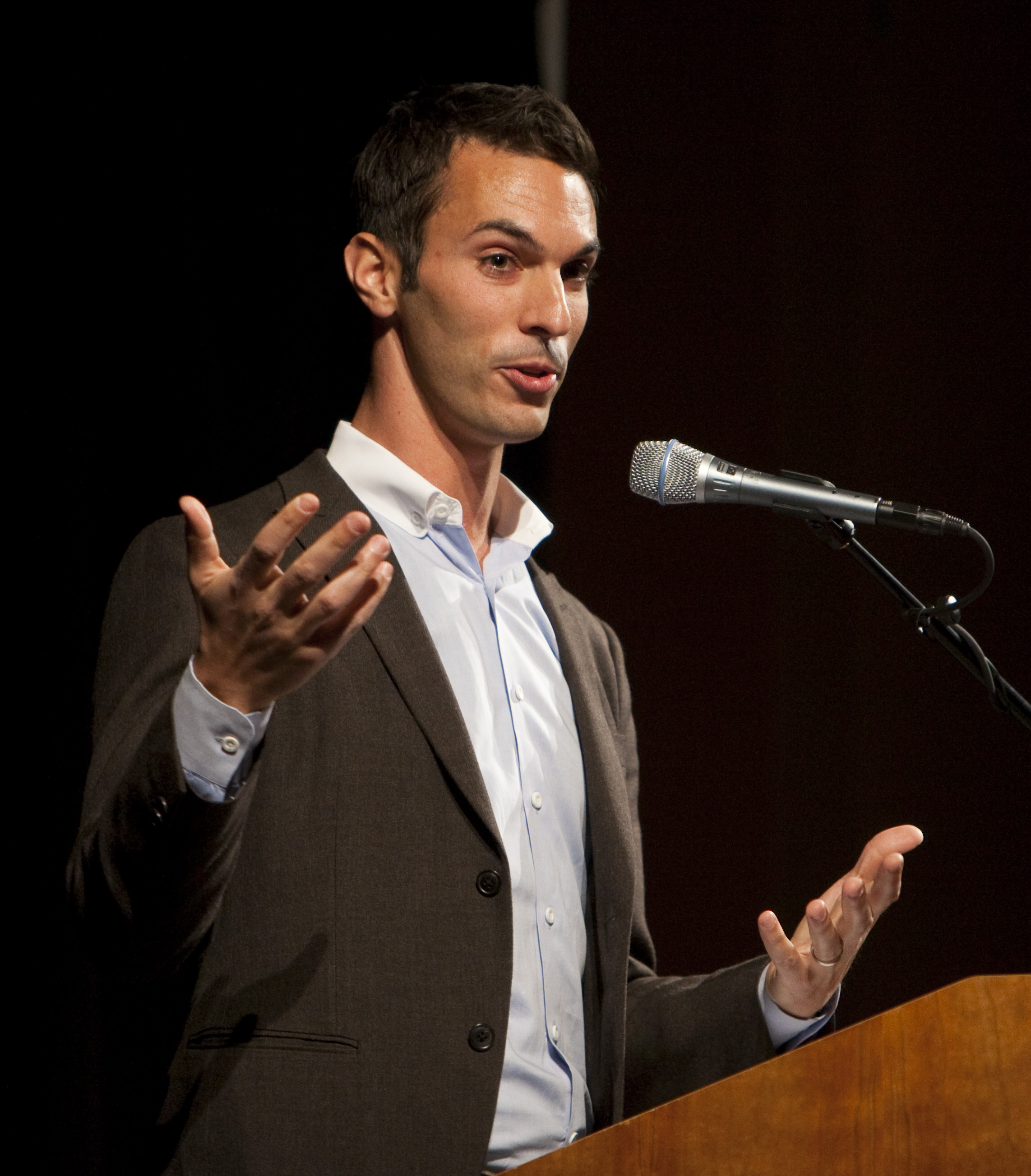
- Shapiro in 2012
- Born: September 30, 1978 (age 48); Fargo, North Dakota, U.S.
- Education: Yale University (BA)
- Occupation: Radio journalist
- Years active: 2001–present
- Employer: National Public Radio
- Spouse: Michael Gottlieb (m. 2004)
- Father: Leonard Shapiro
- Relatives: Susan Stamberg (cousin)
- Website: arishapiro.work

Ari Michael Shapiro (born September 30, 1978) is an American radio journalist and singer. In September 2015, Shapiro became one of four rotating hosts on National Public Radio's flagship drive-time program All Things Considered, a role he held until 2025. He previously served as White House correspondent and international correspondent based in London for NPR.

== Early life and education ==
Ari Shapiro was born in Fargo, North Dakota, the son of Elayne (née Halpern), a university communications professor, and Leonard Shapiro, a database researcher and university teacher. Shapiro is Jewish. When he was eight years old, he moved with his family to Beaverton, Oregon. He attended Beaverton High School. He graduated magna cum laude from Yale University in 2000 with a Bachelor of Arts degree in English. At Yale, he sang in Mixed Company of Yale and was a member of the Scroll and Key secret society.

== Career ==
Shapiro began his NPR career as an intern to legal affairs correspondent Nina Totenberg in January 2001. Following that assignment, he worked as an editorial assistant and an assistant editor on Morning Edition. After working as a regional reporter for NPR in Atlanta and Miami and five years as NPR's Justice Correspondent, Shapiro began covering the White House in 2010. In 2014, he became NPR's correspondent in London. On July 9, 2015, NPR announced that Shapiro and Kelly McEvers would join Audie Cornish and Robert Siegel as hosts of NPR's All Things Considered program.

In June 2020, NPR announced Shapiro would co-host a new daily podcast titled Consider This.

Since 2009, Shapiro has been a regular guest singer with the band Pink Martini. He appears on four of the band's albums, singing in several languages. He made his live debut with the band at the Hollywood Bowl. He has performed live with them frequently since then, including at such venues as Carnegie Hall and the Beacon Theatre in New York City, Kennedy Center in Washington, D.C., the Olympia in Paris, Kew Gardens in London, and the Lycabettus Theatre in Athens.

In 2019, Shapiro embarked on a cabaret career, joining Alan Cumming for a show called Och & Oy! A Considered Cabaret with performances in Fire Island and Provincetown. Och & Oy has gone on to tour the United States including performances at the Kennedy Center and the Cafe Carlyle. Shapiro has also done solo cabaret performances around the United States, including in such venues as Joe's Pub and 54 Below.

In 2023, Harper Collins published his debut memoir, The Best Strangers in the World: Stories from a Life Spent Listening. It became an instant New York Times bestseller and was described by Kirkus reviews as "a clever and compulsively readable crowd pleaser".

In 2024, Shapiro was announced as the host of the seventh season, and the second by Netflix, of the reality TV series The Mole.

In 2025, Shapiro announced he would be leaving his role at NPR. His last day was September 26.

== Recognition and awards ==
Shapiro's work has been recognized with journalism awards, including the American Bar Association's Silver Gavel Award, the Daniel Schorr Journalism Prize, a laurel from the Columbia Journalism Review, the American Judges Association's American Gavel Award, and he was named Journalist of the Year in 2023 by NLGJA, the association of LGBTQ+ journalists. Shapiro has won three national Edward R. Murrow awards; one for a global series that connected the dots between climate change, migration, and far-right political leaders; another for his reporting on the life and death of Breonna Taylor; and the third for his coverage of the Trump Administration's asylum policies on the US-Mexico border. Shapiro was the first NPR reporter to be promoted to correspondent before age 30.

In May 2010, the pop-culture magazine Paper included Shapiro in an annual list of "Beautiful People", saying he "must have a clone. No one man could have so many talents and be in so many places at once."

In December 2010, MSNBC's entertainment website BLTWY placed Shapiro 26th on its "power list" of "35 people under 35 who changed DC in 2010," calling him "one of NPR's fastest rising stars."

In 2016 and 2008, LGBT-themed magazine Out included Shapiro in the "Out 100", a list of "the year's most interesting, influential, and newsworthy LGBT people". Shapiro was also included on a list of openly gay media professionals in The Advocate's "Forty under 40" issue of June/July 2009.

In 2023, Shapiro received a Doctor of Humane Letters honorary degree from the University of Portland.

== Personal life ==
On February 27, 2004, Shapiro and longtime boyfriend Michael Gottlieb were married at San Francisco City Hall. Gottlieb is a lawyer who worked in the office of the White House Counsel from 2013 to 2015. Shapiro and Susan Stamberg, the first co-host of All Things Considered, are cousins.

== Bibliography ==
- Shapiro, Ari (2023). The Best Strangers in the World: Stories from a life spent listening. New York: HarperOne. ISBN 978-0-06-322134-5.

== See also ==
- List of LGBT people from Portland, Oregon
