= Homage (film) =

- Directed by: Ross Kagan Marks
- Screenplay by: Mark Medoff
- Based on: The Homage that Follows by Mark Medoff
- Produced by: Elan Sassoon; Mark Medoff
- Starring: Blythe Danner; Frank Whaley; Sheryl Lee
- Cinematography: Tom Richmond
- Edited by: Kevin Tent
- Music by: W. G. Snuffy Walden
- Production company: Skyline Entertainment
- Release dates: January 23, 1995 (Sundance); November 24, 1995 (San Francisco)
- Running time: 96 minutes
- Country: United States
- Language: English

Homage is a 1995 American crime thriller film directed by Ross Kagan Marks, written by Mark Medoff, and starring Blythe Danner, Frank Whaley and Sheryl Lee. It is based on Medoff's play The Homage that Follows. It premiered at the 1995 Sundance Film Festival, where Marks was a nominee for the Grand Jury Prize for Drama.

== Plot ==
The film opens with Archie holding a gun over Lucy and shooting her dead while her mother Katherine looks on in horror at the ranch they are all at. Archie is arrested and many headlines are made over Lucy's tragic death. Archie while in jail, plots his strategy with his lawyer. He taunts the deputy watching him with racial slurs and stereotypes. The movie flashes back to Archie first showing up at the ranch looking to apply for the farmhand position. Katherine considers herself lucky to get Archie and hires him immediately. He finds out Katherine's daughter is Lucy Samuel from the TV show "Banyon's Band" and is shocked. She comes and Archie immediately sees the hostile estranged relationship Lucy and Katherine have. He tries to mend the burned bridges between them and get Lucy interested in him. He writes a tailor-made star-vehicle screenplay for her entitled "The Journey to Galaxy Sixteen". She finds it schlocky and perverted and refuses. She rebuffs him. One morning when she is using the toilet, Archie is taking down the screens down to clean them and sees her. The relationship is more strained. Lucy tells Katherine. Archie angrily confronts Lucy and they fight.

Deputy Gilbert and Lucy have a romantic history and she runs into him one night at the local honky-tonk called "Cowboys" where the bar welcomes Lucy back to town. They dance together. She takes Deputy Gilbert out into the field at the ranch and dances seductively for him. She goes home and drops bit of cookies into her mouth and opens up to Archie, while drunk. She acts semi-flirtatious and asks Archie to rub her belly. His hand travels up her sweater and she snaps out of it and walks off.

Archie reads Lucy's diary and begins stripping off his clothes and masturbates, fantasizing she is with him. Lucy and Katherine make up. Archie feels threatened and interferes. He confesses that he read Lucy's diary. He quotes an angry hateful passage he read in Lucy's journal and she informs her mother. Katherine asks him to leave the ranch as well as Lucy and Katherine. Archie is crestfallen. But she also asks to take the job offer Archie has received. Archie pulls a gun on Lucy and demands she give herself to him. She runs off, he chases her and shoots her dead. Katherine attempts to intervene, but Archie does not comply.

Archie pleads with Katherine to think of him as "her future", but she walks off in disgust. Archie is sure he will get off on a plea of insanity. Deputy Gilbert is worried that Archie will as well and opens the cell, throws Archie his keys and shoots Archie dead to make it look like self-defense and an attempted jailbreak. Archie's former lawyer Smith remarks he knows what happened—giving up Deputy Tellez's testimony, but knows the truth.

Katherine goes back to teaching to take her mind off all the tragedy and move on with her life.

== Cast ==
- Blythe Danner as Katherine Samuel
- Frank Whaley as Archie Landrum
- Sheryl Lee as Lucy Samuel
- Danny Nucci as Gilbert Tellez
- Bruce Davison as Joseph Smith

== Release ==
The film was released at the Roxie Theater in San Francisco on November 24, 1995.

== Reception ==
Roger Ebert awarded the film two and a half stars. John Petrakis of the Chicago Tribune awarded the film one and a half stars.

Variety gave the film a negative review: "But the story provides no real rooting interest, and the creepiness of the material tries one’s patience."

TV Guide also gave the film a negative review: "This arty, overbaked melodrama entirely fails to transcend its source material, Mark Medoff's pretentious stage play The Homage That Follows."

Kevin Thomas of the Los Angeles Times also gave the film a negative review and wrote, "Homage is too long, too repetitive, and too much of its dialogue is too literary for the screen."

Stephen Holden of The New York Times also gave the film a negative review and wrote, "Like many movies adapted from plays, Homage is often overbearingly speechy. The movie tries to pump up the energy by punctuating the monologues with zooming metallic sound effects worthy of "Hard Copy." But if the director, Ross Kagan Marks, intended these shock tactics as a commentary on tabloid television and its audience, the technique only comes across as a jarring affectation."
