= When You Comin' Back, Red Ryder? (film) =

1979 film by Milton Katselas

- Directed by: Milton Katselas
- Written by: Mark Medoff (based on his play)
- Produced by: Marjoe Gortner
- Starring: Marjoe Gortner; Hal Linden; Lee Grant; Candy Clark; Peter Firth; Pat Hingle; Stephanie Faracy; Audra Lindley; Bill McKinney
- Cinematography: Jules Brenner
- Edited by: Richard Chew
- Music by: Jack Nitzsche
- Production company: Melvin Simon Productions
- Distributed by: Columbia Pictures
- Release date: February 9, 1979 (New York)
- Running time: 113 minutes
- Country: United States
- Language: English
- Budget: $1.7 million

When You Comin' Back, Red Ryder? is a 1979 American drama film written by Mark Medoff and adapted from his play of the same name. It was directed by Milton Katselas.

== Plot ==
Teddy, a troubled Vietnam veteran, has his car break down near a Texas roadside diner. He goes inside and subjects the diners to physical and mental torture.

== Cast ==
- Marjoe Gortner as Teddy
- Hal Linden as Richard
- Lee Grant as Clarisse
- Peter Firth as Red
- Candy Clark as Cheryl
- Pat Hingle as Striker
- Stephanie Faracy as Angel
- Bill McKinney as Tommy Clark
- Audra Lindley as Ceil Ryder
- Riley Hill as Junior Ferguson
- Ron Soble as Sheriff Garcia
- Robert Easton as Customs Man
- Barry Cahill as Customs Doctor
- Mark Medoff as Faith Healer
- Alberto Piña as Mexican Father
- Anne Ramsey as Rhea

== Reception ==
The film received mostly negative reviews on its opening engagements in New York and Los Angeles. Kevin Thomas said in the Los Angeles Times that the film "strikes and maintains such a relentlessly shrill, bombastic note that it becomes abusive of the viewer. Worse yet, this clobbering approach, compounded by an oppressive use of close-ups and a noisy, often merely crass score, serves only to underline the obviousness of all that Medoff has to say and to make his characters verge all the more upon caricature." Peter Rainer of the Los Angeles Herald Examiner described the film as "so exuberantly awful that it's almost a classic bad movie. It's been a long time since a movie has featured this sort of evangelical, freaky-hip '60s Hate-America dramaturgy. I'm not feeling nostalgic." He added that "except for a few alterations, the movie preserves the play — the way an outhouse preserves odor." Janet Maslin of The New York Times commented that "the beginning of Teddy's attack on a band‐of variously sweet or spineless innocents who are in no way armed against him is conceived in genuine viciousness and executed sharply: this part of the movie gives off its share of sparks. But Mark Medoff, in rewriting his play for the screen, has made structural changes that flatten the latter portion of the story and remove a lot of the sting. The movie comes apart well before it is over." Ernest Leogrande of the Daily News gave it a marginally more positive review, largely on the basis of Gortner's performance. He wrote that the actor "dominates the movie with the intensity of a man with a venom-induced mania. It's easy to see why he was attracted to buy the play as a movie for himself. The central character of Teddy is one of those roles that gives a performer a chance to chew rugs and eat a script alive."

The movie was a box office bomb in both markets, and Columbia Pictures opted not to release it in any other part of the United States.

It was eventually picked up for Canadian distribution by Astral Films, which opened it in Toronto on December 14, 1979. The reviews in that city were equally negative. Clyde Gilmour of The Toronto Star called it "a grisly example of the Bad Luck To All Of Them movie which we've seen, in one form or another, far too often throughout the Septic Seventies [...] After you’ve fretfully endured the first hour of it with another hour still to go a nasty thought starts flickering through your mind: You decide that the only conceivable “happy ending” would be to watch the entire cast go over a high cliff in a bus." He later said the movie was one of the worst films to be released in Toronto during 1979. Jay Scott of The Globe and Mail wrote that "the performers are adequate, and Marjoe Gortner and Stephanie Faracy are something more than that. But the actors cannot overcome director Milton Katselas' weakness for cinematic tricks of the sixties. (Red Ryder is set in 1968—there is no reason it should be filmed in the style of movies of the period.) Katselas' willingness to undercut the climax by (1) taking it out of the roadhouse, and (2) filming it in slow motion, succeeds only in dating the play, and that's unfortunate: at a time when the United States is being held hostage by Iran, a thoughtful treatment the long-range effect wielded by the Vietnam war on American myths of heroism could not be more relevant." Conversely, George Anthony gave the film a more positive review in the Toronto Sun, describing it as "a searing screen version of the nervous- making play that has stunned theatregoers for the past seven years"; he also said it was "strong stuff, but well worth the terror" and praised Gortner's performance.
