= The Twilight of the Golds (film) =

1997 American television film

- DVD cover
- Genre: Drama
- Based on: The Twilight of the Golds by Jonathan Tolins
- Screenplay by: Jonathan Tolins; Seth Bass
- Directed by: Ross Kagan Marks
- Starring: Jennifer Beals; Brendan Fraser; Garry Marshall; Faye Dunaway; Jon Tenney
- Music by: Lee Holdridge
- Country of origin: United States
- Original language: English

Production
- Executive producer: Garry Marshall
- Producers: Paul Colichman; John Davimos; Mark R. Harris
- Cinematography: Tom Richmond
- Editor: Dana Congdon
- Running time: 92 minutes
- Production company: Showtime Networks

Original release
- Network: Showtime
- Release: March 23, 1997

The Twilight of the Golds is an American drama television film directed by Ross Kagan Marks and written by Jonathan Tolins and Seth Bass, based on the stage play by Tolins. The film was screened at the January 1997 Sundance Film Festival prior to its broadcast premiere on Showtime in March 1997. The cast includes Jennifer Beals, Brendan Fraser, Garry Marshall, Faye Dunaway and Jon Tenney. The film deals with the issue of fictional genetic testing, and asks the question, "if testing could reveal the sexual orientation of your unborn child, and you knew he or she would be gay, would you abort?".

== Plot ==
Suzanne and her husband Rob are thrilled to discover she's pregnant. Rob is a doctor specializing in genetic research, so they run full tests on the fetus. Suzanne discovers that although she has a healthy baby, the boy will most likely be gay. Rob and Suzanne are no longer thrilled. Do they really want a gay child? Is it better to spare him a life of societal marginalizing? Suzanne talks to her parents about the revelation and tells them she is considering aborting the fetus, much to the dismay of her gay brother David, whose sexual orientation has never been fully accepted by his conservative family. David cuts off communication with his parents when they can't deny that they too might have considered abortion under similar circumstances. Suzanne chooses to have the baby, though this decision leads to a breakup with Rob, who does not wish to raise a gay son.

== Cast ==
- Garry Marshall as Walter Gold
- Faye Dunaway as Phyliss Gold
- Brendan Fraser as David Gold
- Jennifer Beals as Suzanne Stein
- Jon Tenney as Rob Stein
- John Schlesinger as Dr. Adrian Lodge
- Rosie O'Donnell as Jackie
- Sean O'Bryan as Steven (David's boyfriend)

== Critical reception ==
Variety criticized the acting, saying "Beals is way out of her depth...Dunaway is ludicrously miscast...Fraser is too WASP-y, while Rosie O’Donnell turns up to deliver snappy comic relief as Suzanne's co-worker". Although they did concede the movie was "pacey and watchable". The Austin Chronicle wasn't particularly impressed with the acting either, describing Fraser as pulling out the stops too far; "the character is far from the mincing prototypical Hollywood homosexual of yore, but you still come away with the feeling that Fraser's earnest speechifying and flip tantrums are a charade". They also stated that, "Marshall and Dunaway, who play the embittered parents with such an overload of whiny Jewish guilt that you end up wanting to slap them". They rated the film two out of five stars. The review in Radio Times complained that "there is a lot of screaming in this TV movie...Director Ross Marks must think that having his actors yelling their lines will make the audience understand them better, and the overwrought performances ruin an interesting premise". They also gave the film two out of five stars.

TV Guide was a little more forgiving of the acting, stating "Fraser and Marshall invest their broadly written roles with remarkable depth, while Dunaway's fluttering pretensions to yenta-ism are singularly unconvincing". John J. O'Connor however was convinced the acting was very good, writing in The New York Times, "Mr. Fraser is especially outstanding as David, the dedicated outsider always willing to walk through the magic fire that might awaken another part of the soul. Ms. Beals manages to give the irritatingly indecisive Suzanne a sheen of sympathy. Mr. Marshall is blisteringly on target as the father and, in the most unexpected bit of casting, Ms. Dunaway is a wonderfully impossible but irresistible Jewish mother". Historian Stephen Tropiano wrote in his book, The Prime Time Closet: A History of Gays and Lesbians on TV, that "this overwrought family drama is marred by serious overacting via the miscast Faye Dunaway and Garry Marshall as Jewish parents", but said Jennifer Beals was a "stand out performance".

== Nominations and awards ==
- Satellite Award for Best Performance by an Actress in a Mini-Series or Motion Picture Made for Television (Jennifer Beals, winner)
- CableACE Award for Supporting Actress in a Movie or Miniseries (Faye Dunaway, nominated)
- Screen Actors Guild Award for Outstanding Performance by a Female Actor in a TV Movie or Miniseries (Faye Dunaway, nominated)
- GLAAD Media Award for Outstanding Made for TV Movie (nominated)

https://www.humanitasprize.org The screenplay was also nominated for the prestigious Humanitas Prize, an award for film and television writing intended to promote human dignity, meaning, and freedom.

== See also ==
- List of made-for-television films with LGBT characters
