= Leonard Shapiro =

American computer scientist

- Born: Leonard D. Shapiro
- Education: Reed College; Yale University (PhD)
- Occupation: Computer scientist
- Spouse: Elayne Shapiro
- Children: 3, including Ari

Leonard D. Shapiro is an American computer scientist and professor emeritus of computer science at Portland State University. He is known for his contributions to database systems, particularly in the areas of query processing and optimization.

== Education ==
Shapiro graduated from Reed College in 1965, Phi Beta Kappa. He earned a doctor of philosophy from Yale University in 1969.

== Career ==
Shapiro held positions at the University of Minnesota from 1969 to 1977 and North Dakota State University from 1977 to 1987. He served as the chairman of the Division of Mathematical Sciences at North Dakota State University from 1977 to 1985.

In 1987, Shapiro joined Portland State University as a professor of computer science, where he also served as department chair from 1987 to 1994. He later became the director of the Data Intensive Systems Center (DISC).

== Research and contributions ==
Shapiro's research has significantly impacted database systems, particularly in the areas of query processing, optimization, and main memory databases. His work spans computer science, economics, statistics, and mathematics.

One of his most cited works is "Implementation techniques for main memory database systems" (1984), co-authored with David J. DeWitt and others, which explored the changes necessary for relational database systems to take advantage of large amounts of main memory.

Other notable contributions include research on join processing in database systems with large main memories, and work on data compression and database performance.

== Awards and recognition ==
In 2002-2003, Shapiro was elected by students as Outstanding Computer Science Teacher at Portland State University.

== Personal life ==
Shapiro is married to Elayne Shapiro née Halpern. They have three sons, Daniel, Joseph and Ari Shapiro. Shapiro is active in community service, having served on the Board of Directors for Our House of Portland, as Vice President of Hospice of Washington County, and as a volunteer consultant for Tri-Met on the use of computers and the web for bus on-time information.
