= Castle Valley Academy =

Private boarding school in Utah, US

Coordinates: 38°39′04″N 109°23′56″W

Location
- 320 E. Castleton Road; Castle Valley, UT 84532

Information
- Former name: Daystar Adventist Academy
- School type: Private, co-educational, boarding
- Religious affiliation: Seventh-day Adventist
- Principal: Kathy Trumper
- Website: www.cva.school/transition

Castle Valley Academy is a private boarding high school located in Castle Valley, Utah. It is affiliated with (but not owned or operated by) the Seventh-Day Adventist Church. It is a part of the Seventh-day Adventist education system, the world's second largest Christian school system.

== See also ==
- List of Seventh-day Adventist secondary schools
- Seventh-day Adventist education
