= The Twilight of the Golds =

1993 play by Jonathan Tolins

The Twilight of the Golds is a play by Jonathan Tolins and produced by Charles H. Duggan that premiered at the Pasadena Playhouse on January 17, 1993. Strong reviews propelled it to theatres across the country including a stop at The Kennedy Center. After fifteen previews, the Broadway theatre production, directed by Arvin Brown, opened on October 21, 1993 at the Booth Theatre, where it ran for 29 performances. The cast included Jennifer Grey as Suzanne, Raphael Sbarge as David, David Groh as Walter, Judith Scarpone as Phyllis and Michael Spound as Rob. The play had received strong reviews across the country but was "largely clobbered" when it reached Broadway.

Tolins adapted his play for a television movie, The Twilight of the Golds, with a "completely different ending".

== Plot summary ==
The controversial dramedy tackles the issue of fictional genetic testing that would determine the sexual orientation of an unborn child. When Suzanne Gold-Stein discovers her son is destined to be gay, she considers aborting the fetus, much to the dismay of her gay brother David, whose sexual orientation has never been fully accepted by his conservative family. In the stage version, she has the abortion late in the pregnancy, resulting in her inability to bear any more children, as well as David's estrangement from the family. In the film version, Suzanne chooses to have the baby, though this leads to a break-up with her husband, who does not wish to raise a gay son.
