= Rio Grande Theatre =

- U.S. National Register of Historic Places
- NM State Register of Cultural Properties
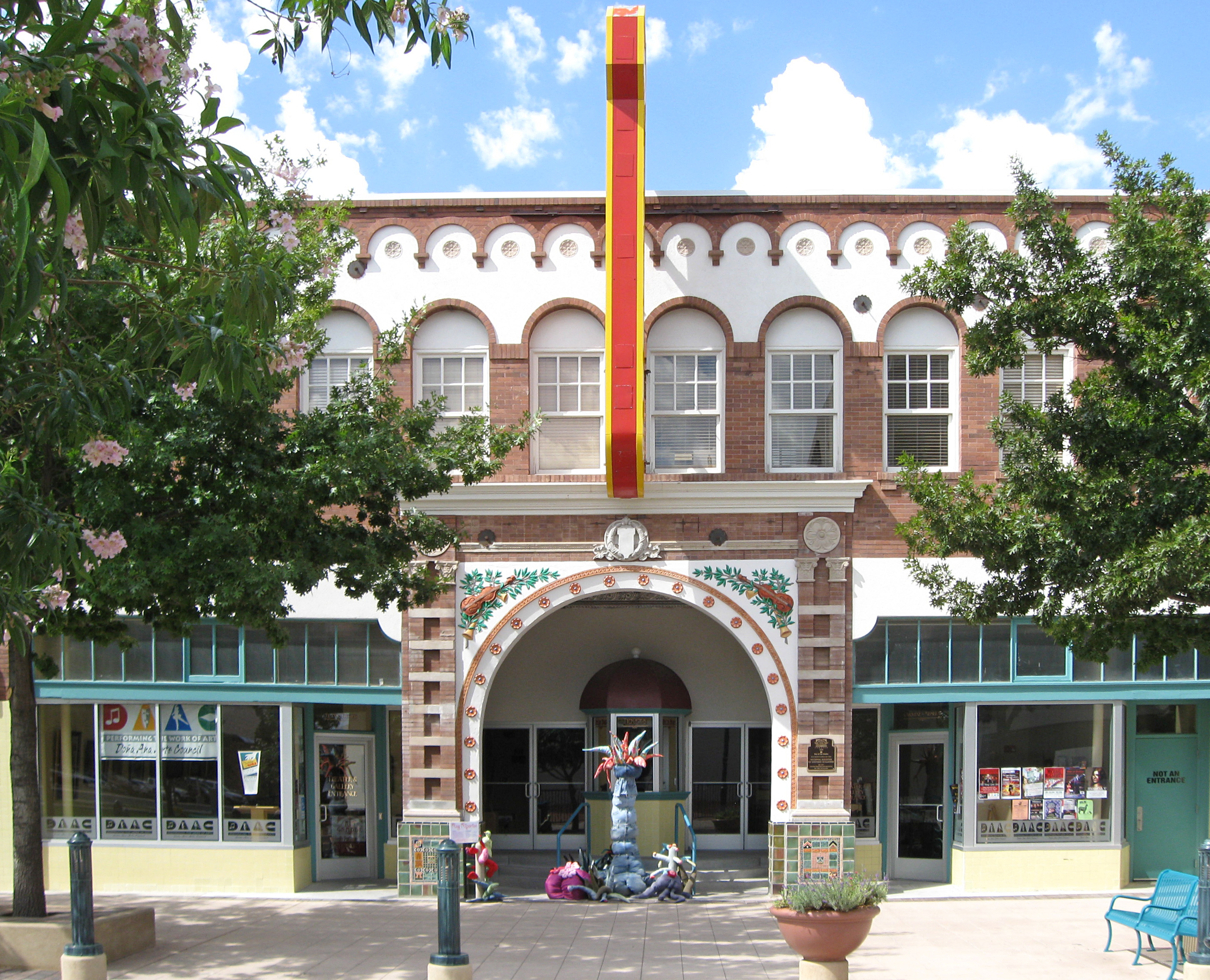

- Location within New Mexico
- Location: 211 N. Downtown Mall, Las Cruces, New Mexico
- Coordinates: 32°18′38″N 106°46′42″W
- Area: less than one acre
- Built: 1926
- Architect: Thorman, Otto H. and Guy L. Frazer; Goetting, C.A.
- Architectural style: Renaissance
- NRHP reference No.: 03001352
- NMSRCP No.: 1829

Significant dates
- Added to NRHP: January 2, 2004
- Designated NMSRCP: August 8, 2003

The Rio Grande Theatre in Las Cruces, New Mexico was opened on July 29, 1926. The theatre was built by Seale and Dyne and operated by the Central Theatres Corporation of Denver.

The first movie shown was the silent movie Mare Nostrum, directed by Rex Ingram.

Fox West Coast Theatres bought the Rio Grande Theatre in October 1929. The Fox chain installed sound equipment and showed a sound picture for the October 20, 1929 opening night.

The theatre survived both an earthquake and a fire in the early 1930s. It remained in operation until 1997, when it closed due to financial hardship. The theatre was purchased by the Dona Ana Arts Council and restored, opening again in 2005.

Many major musical artists have performed at the Rio Grande Theatre including Judy Collins, Joe Bonamassa, and Wishbone Ash.

== See also ==
- National Register of Historic Places listings in Doña Ana County, New Mexico
