= Castle Valley, Utah =

Unincorporated community in Utah, United States

- Town
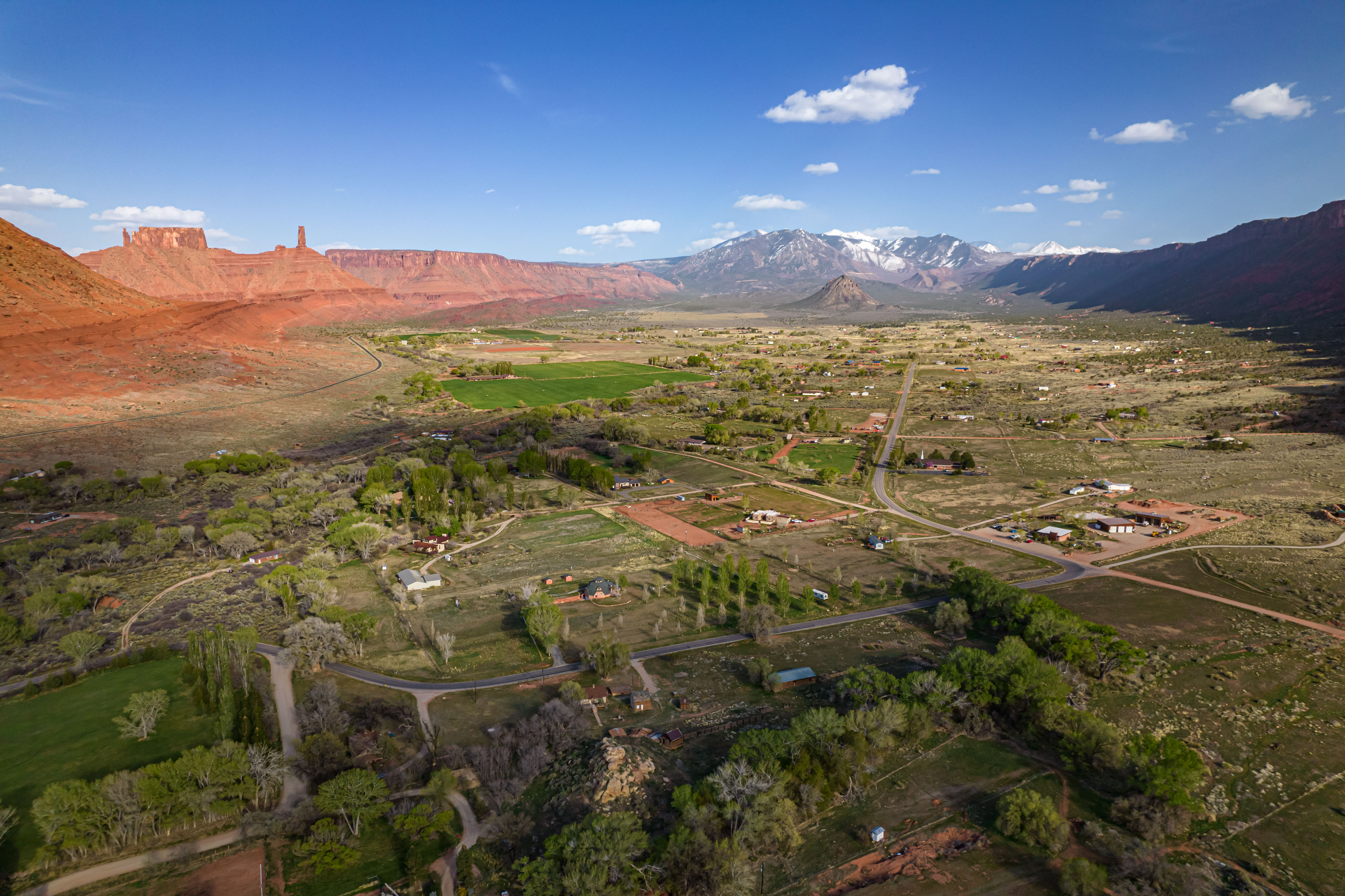
- Castle Valley sits next to Castleton Tower, Round Mountain, and in the distance, the La Sal Mountains, April 2021

- Location in Grand County and the state of Utah.
- Coordinates: 38°37′40″N 109°23′20″W
- Country: United States
- State: Utah
- County: Grand

Area
  - Total: 9.28 sq mi (24.04 km^{2})
  - Land: 9.28 sq mi (24.04 km^{2})
  - Water: 0 sq mi (0.00 km^{2})
- Elevation: 4,774 ft (1,455 m)

Population (2020)
  - Total: 347
  - Density: 37.7/sq mi (14.56/km^{2})
- Time zone: UTC-7 (Mountain (MST))
  - Summer (DST): UTC-6 (MDT)
- ZIP code: 84532
- Area code: 435
- FIPS code: 49-11000
- GNIS feature ID: 2413180
- Website: castlevalleyutah.gov

Castle Valley is a town in the Castle Valley in southeastern Grand County, Utah, United States. The population was 347 at the 2020 census. The town is approximately 16 miles (26 km) northeast of Moab, near State Route 128.

The community, and the valley within which it is located, was named for castle-like rock formations near the town site.

== Geography ==
According to the United States Census Bureau, the town has a total area of 8.1 square miles (21 km^{2}), all land.

=== Climate ===
Climate data for Castle Valley, Utah (1991–2020)
Month	Jan	Feb	Mar	Apr	May	Jun	Jul	Aug	Sep	Oct	Nov	Dec	Year
Mean daily maximum °F (°C)	40.6 (4.8)	48.9 (9.4)	60.3 (15.7)	67.1 (19.5)	78.0 (25.6)	90.2 (32.3)	96.3 (35.7)	93.1 (33.9)	84.1 (28.9)	71.4 (21.9)	55.3 (12.9)	41.6 (5.3)	68.9 (20.5)
Daily mean °F (°C)	30.1 (−1.1)	37.7 (3.2)	47.1 (8.4)	53.7 (12.1)	63.8 (17.7)	74.9 (23.8)	80.8 (27.1)	77.9 (25.5)	69.5 (20.8)	56.4 (13.6)	42.6 (5.9)	31.2 (−0.4)	55.5 (13.1)
Mean daily minimum °F (°C)	19.5 (−6.9)	26.4 (−3.1)	33.8 (1.0)	40.3 (4.6)	49.6 (9.8)	59.5 (15.3)	65.2 (18.4)	62.8 (17.1)	54.8 (12.7)	41.3 (5.2)	29.9 (−1.2)	20.8 (−6.2)	42.0 (5.6)
Average precipitation inches (mm)	0.75 (19)	0.72 (18)	0.89 (23)	0.96 (24)	0.85 (22)	0.43 (11)	0.79 (20)	0.77 (20)	0.91 (23)	1.34 (34)	0.67 (17)	0.75 (19)	9.83 (250)
Average snowfall inches (cm)	3.6 (9.1)	1.6 (4.1)	1.0 (2.5)	1.0 (2.5)	0.0 (0.0)	0.0 (0.0)	0.0 (0.0)	0.0 (0.0)	0.0 (0.0)	0.0 (0.0)	2.2 (5.6)	5.7 (14)	15.1 (37.8)
Source: NOAA

== Demographics ==
Historical population
Census	Pop.	Note	%±
1980	239		—
1990	211		−11.7%
2000	349		65.4%
2010	319		−8.6%
2020	347		8.8%
U.S. Decennial Census

At the time of 2020 census, there were 354 people residing in the town; at the time of the 2000 census, there were 349 people, 158 households, and 85 families residing in the town. The population density was 39.4 per square mile (15.2/km^{2}). In 2000, there were 230 housing units at an average density of 28.5 per square mile (11.0/km^{2}). The racial makeup of the town in 2000 was 97.13% White, 1.15% from other races, and 1.72% from two or more races. Hispanic or Latino of any race were 2.29% of the population.

There were 158 households, of which 19.6% had children under 18 living with them, 47.5% were married couples living together, 5.1% had a female householder with no husband present, and 45.6% were non-families. 36.1% of all households were made up of individuals, and 4.4% had someone living alone who was 65 years or older. The average household size was 2.21, and the average family size was 2.95.

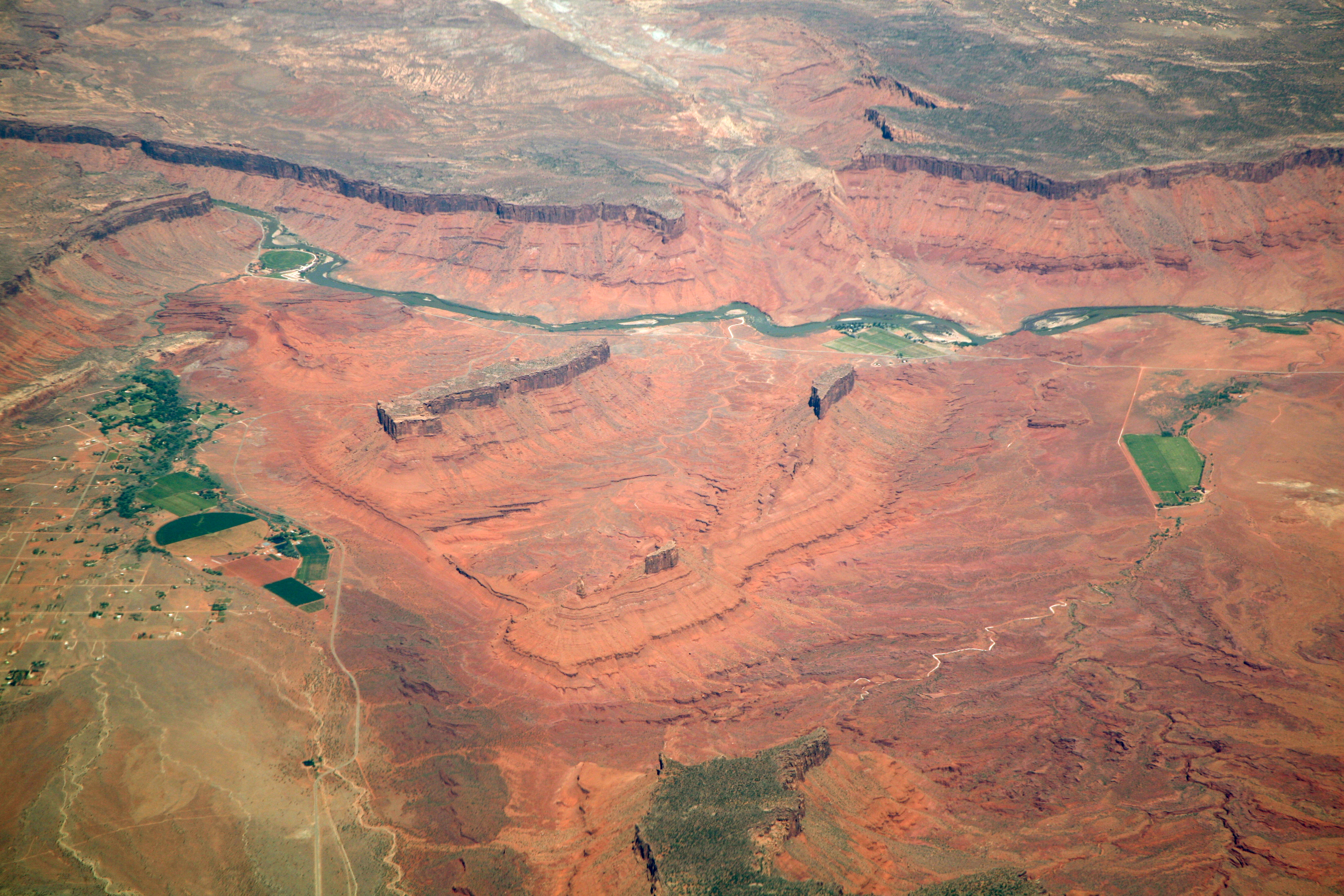
Castle Valley and the Colorado River from the air, June 2012.

Age distribution in 2000 was 20.6% under 18, 5.7% from 18 to 24, 23.8% from 25 to 44, 40.4% from 45 to 64, and 9.5% who were 65 years of age or older. The median age was 45 years. For every 100 females, there were 89.7 males. For every 100 females aged 18 and over, there were 95.1 males.

The median household income was $33,068, and the median family income was $40,500. Males had a median income of $30,500 versus $22,500 for females. The per capita income was $19,726. About 10.9% of families and 21.9% of the population were below the poverty line, including 46.7% of those under age 18 and 11.6% of those age 65 or over.

== See also ==
- List of municipalities in Utah
- Manti-La Sal National Forest
- Terry Tempest Williams
- DayStar Adventist Academy
