= Santa's Cousin =

American film directed by Ross Kagan Marks

- Directed by: Ross Kagan Marks
- Written by: Judy Pennell; Mary Haarmeyer
- Produced by: Keagan Karnes; Mary Haarmeyer; Ross Kagan Marks; Kirk Roos
- Starring: Jonathan Stoddard; Alexandra Harris; Jamey Maurice Clay; Malcolm Engel; Eliza Roberts; Eric Roberts
- Cinematography: Mitch Fowler
- Edited by: Daniel Dinning
- Music by: Roger Neill
- Production companies: Inspirado Films; Rio Road Productions
- Distributed by: Heartstrings Media
- Release date: December 4, 2024 (Las Cruces)
- Running time: 95 minutes
- Country: United States
- Language: English

Santa's Cousin is a 2024 American Christmas romantic comedy film directed by Ross Kagan Marks, written by Judy Pennell and Mary Haarmeyer, and starring Eric Roberts. The film premiered in Las Cruces, New Mexico on December 4, 2024.

== Cast ==
- Eric Roberts as Santa Claus
- John Stoddard
- Alexandra Harris
- Eliza Roberts
- Malcolm Engel

== Production ==
The film was shot in Las Cruces, New Mexico in November 2023.

== Release ==
The film was released in December 2024.
