= Ross Kagan Marks =

American filmmaker and professor

Ross Kagan Marks is an American filmmaker and professor at New Mexico State University.

== Career ==
Ross Kagan Marks directed Walking with Herb, The Twilight of the Golds, and Homage. His credits are the Heart Outright, Fowl, Tarrant County, Showdown on Rio Road, Fluff, and Princess which ended up on the Academy Award live-action shorts.

For The Twilight of the Golds, Marks assembled a cast including Brendan Fraser, Faye Dunaway, Rosie O' Donnell, Jennifer Beals, Jack Klugman, and Garry Marshall. The film and Marks were nominated for awards. Ross Marks's films have won awards at the Sundance Film Festival. Walking with Herb marked Ross Marks's entry into faith-based filmmaking. The film starred Edward James Olmos, George Lopez, and Kathleen Quinlan. Ross Marks's Walking with Herb was reviewed by Dove.

Ross Marks works as a professor at New Mexico State University, and he is the founder of the Las Cruces International Film Festival, where he is also the executive director.

== Personal life ==
Marks is married to Debra Medoff and is the father of three children. His father-in-law was playwright Mark Medoff. As of September 2023, Marks resides in Las Cruces, New Mexico.

== Select filmography as director ==
- Homage (1995)
- The Twilight of the Golds (1997)
- Walking with Herb (2021)
- Santa's Cousin (2024)
