= Walking with Herb =

- Film poster
- Directed by: Ross Kagan Marks
- Screenplay by: Mark Medoff
- Based on: Walking with Herb by Joe Bullock
- Produced by: Brian Espinosa; Ross Marks; Mark Medoff
- Starring: Edward James Olmos; George Lopez; Kathleen Quinlan
- Production companies: Optimism Entertainment; Rio Road Entertainment
- Release date: April 30, 2021
- Country: United States
- Language: English
- Box office: $120,226

Walking with Herb is a 2021 American comedy film directed by Ross Kagan Marks and starring Edward James Olmos, George Lopez and Kathleen Quinlan. It is based on the 2015 novel of the same name by Joe Bullock. Olmos also serves as an executive producer of the film.

== Plot summary ==
In a small New Mexico town, Joe and Shelia are a seasoned married couple grieving alongside their daughter Audrey, after the unexpected deaths of Audrey's Army physician husband and subsequently, her toddler daughter.

With his faith in God greatly diluted, especially so after the loss of his beloved granddaughter, current bank president / former amateur golfer Joe becomes bitter and angry with God. He begins to take out his frustrations on his office punching bag. Joe also attempts to verbally spur with his wife Shelia, who wisely deflects these verbal assaults. Audrey is three months behind on her home mortgage, and is struggling to maintain her financially draining nonprofit school for children, which happens to be $300,000 in arrears. Shelia remains strong in her faith, supports her husband and daughter and looks forward to maintaining and nurturing her flower garden for an upcoming judging event. Adding to Joe's problems, the bank examiner is breathing down his neck for not aggressively pursuing the foreclosure of his daughter's nonprofit school, "Jardin Del Sol".

Joe meets up with Herb, a motorcycle riding emissary of God with individualistic fashion sense on a makeshift golf course in the middle of nowhere. Of interest is his messengering service—a lovable dachshund named, "Sand Wedge". Herb explains to Joe that God has chosen him for a special mission, and that he is here to help Joe. Of course Joe is initially suspicious and distrustful of Herb. One rainy night, Joe contemplates suicide at the edge of a cliff. After an intense heart to heart, with Herb offering to let Joe have his way and end it all, Joe starts to mellow out and their relationship deepens. Herb's conversations are gleefully peppered with humor, nuggets of wisdom, common sense, and of course Bible verses. Herb becomes Joe's confidante, coach, spiritual guide and caddy.

Joe's special mission boosted his faith level. Joe's willingness to complete his mission (despite his initial and ongoing doubts) allowed him to grow his existing God given talents, which ultimately encouraged him to step away from his comfort zone and get the job done. Joe exhibited "stick-to-itiveness" on his journey, with the benefits reaching far beyond whatever Joe could have planned or imagined.

== Cast ==
- Edward James Olmos as Joe Amable-Amo
- George Lopez as Herb
- Kathleen Quinlan as Sheila Amable-Amo
- Jessica Medoff as Audrey Amable-Amo
- Johnathan McClain as Gabe Berkowitz
- Billy Boyd as Archibald "Archie" Borthwick
- Christopher McDonald as Wiley Saunders
- Melissa Chambers as Karen

== Production ==
Early in development, Mary McDonnell was attached to star in the film.

Filming occurred in Las Cruces, New Mexico from September till October 2018.

== Release ==
Optimism Entertainment and Rio Road Entertainment initially planned to release the film theatrically in March 2021. The film was released in select theaters on April 30, 2021.

== Reception ==
Joe Leydon of Variety gave the film a positive review, calling it "a genially pleasant comedy-drama that is elevated by the sincerity and conviction of actors (especially Olmos) fully invested in their roles."
