= Annie Potts =

American actress (born 1952)

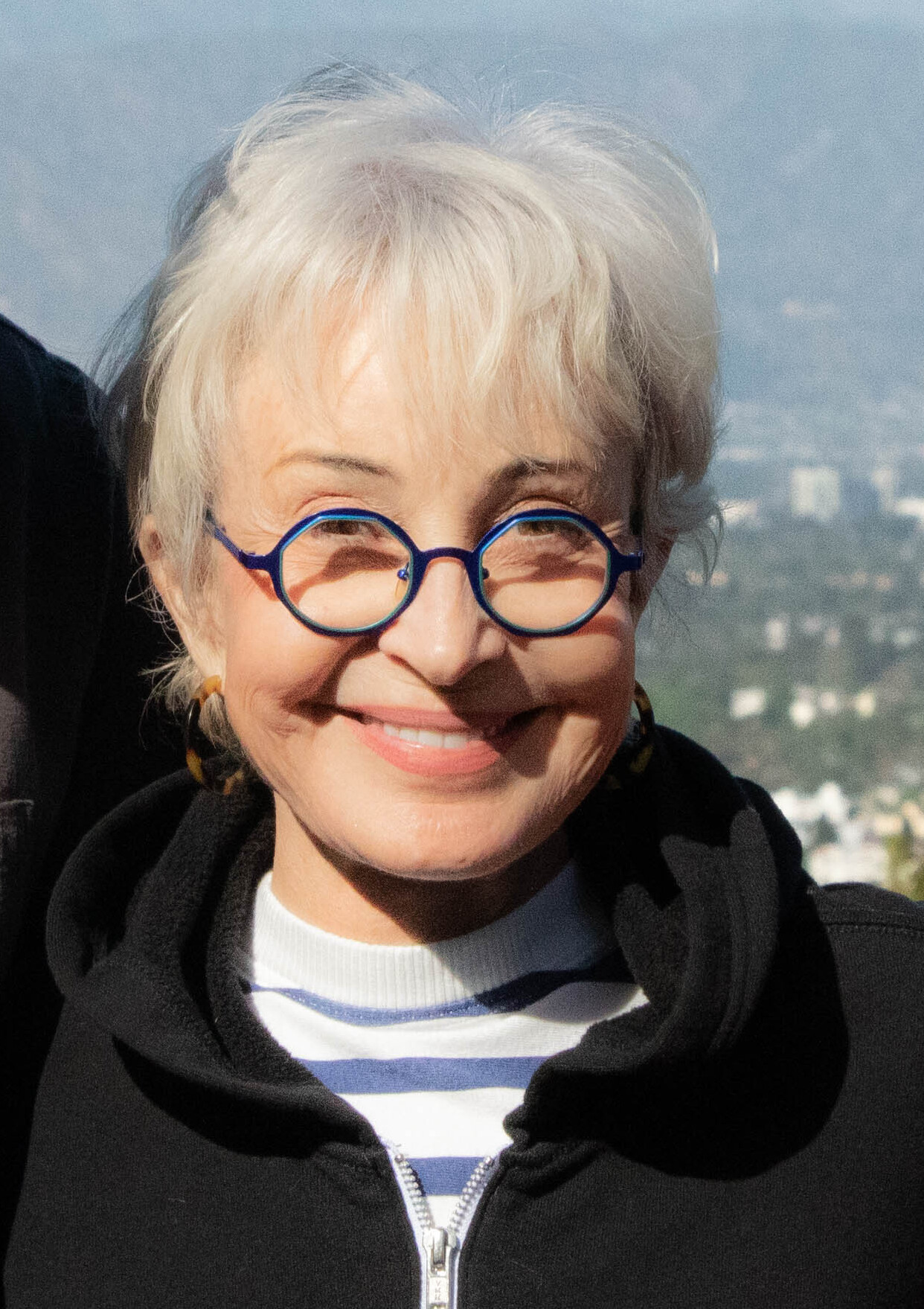
- Potts in 2024
- Born: Anne Hampton Potts; October 28, 1952 (age 73); Nashville, Tennessee, U.S.
- Education: Stephens College (BA)
- Occupation: Actress
- Years active: 1977–present
- Spouses: Steven Hartley (m. 1973; div. 1978); Greg Antonacci (m. 1978; div. 1980); B. Scott Senechal (m. 1981; div. 1989); James Hayman (m. 1990)
- Children: 3

Anne Hampton Potts (born October 28, 1952) is an American actress. She was nominated for a Golden Globe Award for Corvette Summer (1978) and won a Genie Award for Heartaches (1981), before appearing in Ghostbusters (1984), Ghostbusters II (1989), and in various projects within the Ghostbusters franchise. She also appeared in the films Pretty in Pink (1986), Jumpin' Jack Flash (1986), and Who's Harry Crumb? (1989). She voiced Bo Peep in the Toy Story franchise (1995–1999, 2019–present) and in various Disney video games.

On television, Potts played Mary Jo Jackson Shively on the CBS sitcom Designing Women (1986–1993). She was nominated for a 1994 Primetime Emmy Award for playing Dana Palladino on the CBS sitcom Love & War (1993–1995), she played teacher Louanne Johnson on ABC drama Dangerous Minds for one season 1996–1997, and was nominated for the Screen Actors Guild Award in 1998 and 1999 for playing Mary-Elizabeth "M.E." Sims in the Lifetime drama series Any Day Now (1998–2002). Her other television credits include GCB (2012), The Fosters (2013–2018), Young Sheldon (2017–2024), Georgie and Mandy's First Marriage (2024–present), and Best Medicine (2026–present).

== Early life and education ==
Potts was born in Nashville, Tennessee, the third child of Dorothy Harris (née Billingslea) and Powell Grisette Potts. She has two older sisters. They grew up in Franklin, Kentucky, where she graduated from Franklin-Simpson High School in 1970 where she was a cheerleader.

She attended Stephens College in Columbia, Missouri, and graduated with a bachelor's degree in theater. In 1973, Potts and her first husband, Steven Hartley, were in a car crash that left several bones below her waist broken, including compound fractures to both legs, and caused the loss of the heel of her right foot. Hartley lost his left leg.

== Career ==
Potts made her debut on the big screen in 1978 in the Metro-Goldwyn-Mayer comedy film Corvette Summer, with Mark Hamill. She was nominated for a Golden Globe Award in 1979 for her role in the film. In 1982, she won Genie Awards for Best Performance by a Foreign Actress for her role in the film Heartaches, about a young woman married to a stock car racer and carrying his friend's child. In 1980, she played Edith Bedelmeyer, a woman who shared an attic apartment with three other women (played by Georgia Engel, Lorna Patterson, and Francine Tacker) on the short-lived comedy series Goodtime Girls.

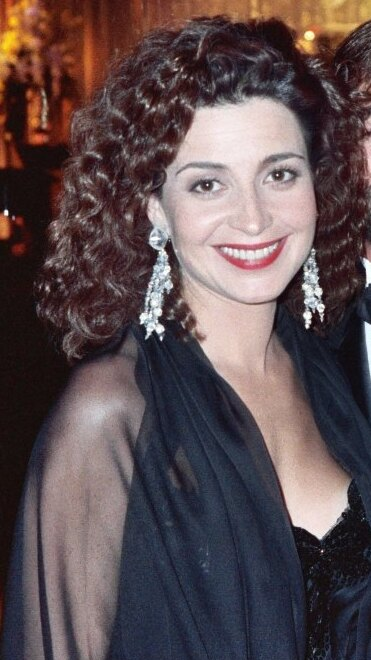
Potts at the 41st Primetime Emmy Awards in 1989

Potts played receptionist Janine Melnitz in the film Ghostbusters (1984), and reprised her role in the sequels Ghostbusters II (1989), Ghostbusters: Afterlife (2021), Ghostbusters: Frozen Empire (2024), as well as Ghostbusters: The Video Game (2009); she created the character's trademark New York accent based on a friend's who was from the city. Potts then appeared as the pragmatic interior designer Mary Jo Shively on the CBS television sitcom Designing Women (1986–1993). She was nominated for a Primetime Emmy Award for Outstanding Lead Actress in a Comedy Series in 1994 for her role as Dana Palladino on CBS's Love & War (1993–1995). She then played teacher Louanne Johnson on the ABC drama Dangerous Minds (1996–1997), and Mary Elizabeth (O'Brien) Sims on the Lifetime Television drama series Any Day Now (1998–2002), for which she was nominated for two Screen Actors Guild Award for Outstanding Performance by a Female Actor in a Drama Series.

Other notable roles include a supporting role in John Hughes's Pretty in Pink (1986), as well as the films Jumpin' Jack Flash (1986), and Who's Harry Crumb? (1989), the voice of Bo Peep in four of the Toy Story films (1995, 1999, 2019 and 2026) and in various Disney video games, and guest-starring roles on such CBS's television series as Magnum, P.I., Joan of Arcadia, Close to Home, Two and a Half Men, and ABC's Men in Trees, Ugly Betty, and Boston Legal. She played a recurring role as Sophie Devere in the NBC's Law & Order: Special Victims Unit from 2005 to 2009.

Potts has done work on audio books; including as the narrator and heroine of Larry McMurtry's Telegraph Days, winning the 2007 Audie Award for Solo Narration-Female, for her portrayal. She starred in the film version of McMurtry's Texasville, a sequel to The Last Picture Show. She made her Broadway debut upon joining the cast of the Tony Award–winning play God of Carnage on November 17, 2009, succeeding Hope Davis in the role of Annette.

In 2012, Potts starred as Elizabeth "Gigi" Stopper in ABC's comedy-drama series GCB, with Leslie Bibb, Kristin Chenoweth, Jennifer Aspen, Miriam Shor, and Marisol Nichols. She says she based her portrayal of the character on Dixie Carter, adding, "Were she still alive, the role would have been hers and should have been." Potts also played a leading role in the 2012 Hallmark Channel original musical film The Music Teacher, about a high-school music teacher who is on the brink of losing her beloved school music program because of district budget cuts. In an effort to spare the program, Daley's former students band together to stage a musical to raise money to keep the program alive.

In March 2013, Potts signed on for the lead role of the ABC comedy-drama pilot Murder in Manhattan about a mother and daughter who team up as amateur sleuths. ABC later looked for a cable network to distribute the series, opting not to air it on network television. In late 2013, it was announced that Potts would join Diane Paulus' revival of Pippin beginning January 21, 2014. She replaced Tony Award nominee Tovah Feldshuh in the role of Pippin's grandmother Berthe. This marked her first appearance in a Broadway musical.

From 2013 to 2018, she appeared as Sharon Elkin on the ABC Family series The Fosters. From 2017 to 2024, she was a series regular on the CBS sitcom Young Sheldon, playing Connie "Meemaw" Tucker, Sheldon's maternal grandmother. Starting in 2024, she reprises the role in a recurring capacity in Georgie & Mandy's First Marriage. In 2026, she appeared on the TV series Best Medicine.

== Personal life ==
Potts married Steven Hartley in 1973 and they divorced in 1978. She married Greg Antonacci in 1978 and they divorced in 1980. Her third marriage was to B. Scott Senechal from 1981 to 1989; they have one son. She has two sons with her fourth husband, James Hayman, whom she married in 1990.

== Filmography ==
=== Film ===
Year	Film	Role	Notes
1978	Corvette Summer	Vanessa	
1978	King of the Gypsies	Persa	
1981	Heartaches	Bonnie Howard	
1984	Ghostbusters	Janine Melnitz	
1984	Crimes of Passion	Amy Grady	
1986	Pretty in Pink	Iona	
1986	Jumpin' Jack Flash	Liz Carlson	
1987	The Man Who Fell to Earth	Louise	
1988	Pass the Ammo	Darla Porter	
1988	She's Having a Baby	Herself	Cameo
1989	Who's Harry Crumb?	Helen Downing	
1989	Ghostbusters II	Janine Melnitz	
1990	Texasville	Karla Jackson	
1992	Breaking the Rules	Mary Klinglitch	
1995	Toy Story	Bo Peep	Voice role
1999	Toy Story 2	Bo Peep	Voice role
2004	Elvis Has Left the Building	Shirl	
2007	The Sunday Man	Mrs. Culp	Short film
2014	Chu and Blossom	Aunt Harley	
2015	As Good As You	Dr. Laura Berg	
2016	Ghostbusters	Vanessa the hotel clerk	Cameo
2016	All At Once	Ginny Maxwell	
2017	Humor Me	Dee	
2017	Izzy Gets the F*ck Across Town	Mary	
2018	Happy Anniversary	Diane	
2019	Toy Story 4	Bo Peep	Voice role
2020	Lamp Life	Bo Peep	Voice role
2021	Arlo the Alligator Boy	Edmée	Voice role
2021	Ghostbusters: Afterlife	Janine Melnitz	
2024	Ghostbusters: Frozen Empire	Janine Melnitz	
2026	Toy Story 5	Bo Peep	Voice cameo
2026	40 Dates and 40 Nights	Gigi	

=== Television ===
Year	Title	Role	Notes
1977	Black Market Baby	Linda Cleary	Television film
1977	Busting Loose	Helene	3 episodes
1978	Family	Caddy Wilde	Episode: "Magic"
1979	Flatbed Annie & Sweetiepie: Lady Truckers	Flatbed Annie	Television film
1979	Visions	Ellen	Episode: "Ladies in Waiting"
1980	Goodtime Girls	Edith Bedelmeyer	Main role
1982	Something So Right	Sunday	Television film
1982	Bayou Romance	Lily	Television film
1983	Cowboy	D.G.	Television film
1983	Remington Steele	Annie Carpenter	Episode: "Steele Crazy After All These Years"
1983–1986	Magnum, P.I.	Tracy Spencer	2 episodes
1984	Why Me?	Daria	Television film
1984	It Came Upon the Midnight Clear	Cindy Mills	Television film
1985	The Twilight Zone	Cathy Lowery	Episode: "Wordplay"
1986–1993	Designing Women	Mary Jo Shively	Main role
1987	CBS Schoolbreak Special	Kathy Sanders	"My Dissident Mom"
1987	Amazing Stories	Bev Binford (voice)	Episode: "The Family Dog"
1989	Hanna-Barbera's 50th: A Yabba Dabba Doo Celebration	Co-host	TV special
1993–1995	Love & War	Dana Palladino	Main role
1995	Her Deadly Rival	Kris Lansford	Television film
1996–1997	Dangerous Minds	LouAnne Johnson	Main role
1997	Over the Top	Hadley Martin	Main role, also producer
1998	Hercules	Syrinx (voice)	Episode: "Hercules and the Muse of Dance"
1998–2002	Any Day Now	Mary Elizabeth 'M.E.' Sims	Main role
1999	Johnny Bravo	Wrangler (voice)	Episode: "Dude Ranch Doofus"
2003	Defending Our Kids: The Julie Posey Story	Julie Posey	Television film
2004	Huff	Doris Johnson	4 episodes
2004–2005	Joan of Arcadia	Lieutenant Lucy Preston	Recurring role
2005	Close to Home	Dr. Marla Dodds	Episode: "Divine Directions"
2005–2009	Law & Order: Special Victims Unit	Sophie Devere	4 episodes
2007	Men in Trees	Mary Alice O'Donnell	4 episodes
2008	Ugly Betty	Linda	Episode: "Zero Worship"
2008	Boston Legal	Joy Espenson	Episode: "The Bad Seed"
2008	Queen Sized	Joan Baker	Television film
2009	Two and a Half Men	Lenore	Episode: "Mmm, Fish. Yum."
2010	Marry Me	Vivienne Carter	Miniseries
2010	Freshman Father	Kathy Patton	Television film
2011	Five	Charlotte's Mom	Television film
2012	GCB	Gigi Stopper	Main role
2012	The Music Teacher	Alyson Daley	Television film
2012	Fish Hooks	Nurse Fishington (voice)	3 episodes
2012	Animal Practice	Virginia Coleman	2 episodes
2013–2018	The Fosters	Sharon Elkin	Recurring role
2013	Randy Cunningham: 9th Grade Ninja	Tawny Zingwald (voice)	Episode: "Stank'd to the Future/Wave Slayers"
2013	Grey's Anatomy	Joyce	Episode: "Map of You"
2014	Instant Mom	Roberta Montgomery	Episode: "True Romance"
2014	Young & Hungry	Donna Kaminski (voice)	Episode: "Pilot"; uncredited
2015	Major Crimes	Clarissa	Episode: "Special Master: Part Two"
2015	NCIS: New Orleans	Olivia Brody	Episode: "Broken Hearted"
2015–2016	Chicago Med	Helen Manning	Recurring role
2016	Scandal	Louise Baker	Episode: "Buckle Up"
2016	Royal Pains	Mrs. Sacani	2 episodes
2017–2019	Welcome to the Wayne	Olympia Timbers (voice)	4 episodes
2017–2024	Young Sheldon	Constance "Connie" Tucker (Meemaw)	Main role
2021	I Heart Arlo	Edmée (voice)	5 episodes
2024–present	Georgie & Mandy's First Marriage	Constance "Connie" Tucker (Meemaw)	Recurring role
2026	Best Medicine	Aunt Sarah	Main role

=== Video games ===
Year	Title	Voice role	Notes
1995	Disney's Animated Storybook: Toy Story	Bo Peep	
1999	Toy Story 2: Buzz Lightyear to the Rescue	Bo Peep	
2009	Ghostbusters: The Video Game	Janine Melnitz	
2010	Toy Story 3: The Video Game	Bo Peep	
2016	Disney Magic Kingdoms	Bo Peep	Voice lines removed in a later update
2019	Ghostbusters: The Video Game Remastered	Janine Melnitz	Archival recordings
2023	Disney Speedstorm	Bo Peep	

=== Stage ===
Year	Title	Role	Notes
2009–2010	God of Carnage	Annette	Broadway
2014	Pippin	Berthe	Broadway

== Awards and nominations ==
Year	Association	Category	Work	Result
1979	Golden Globe Awards	New Star of the Year – Actress	Corvette Summer	Nominated
1982	Genie Awards	Best Performance by a Foreign Actress	Heartaches	Won
1994	Primetime Emmy Awards	Outstanding Lead Actress in a Comedy Series	Love & War	Nominated
1999	Screen Actors Guild Awards	Outstanding Performance by a Female Actor in a Drama Series	Any Day Now	Nominated
2000	Screen Actors Guild Awards	Outstanding Performance by a Female Actor in a Drama Series	Any Day Now	Nominated
2019	Washington D.C. Area Film Critics Association Awards	Best Voice Performance	Toy Story 4	Nominated
2019	Critics' Choice Television Awards	Best Supporting Actress in a Comedy Series	Young Sheldon	Nominated
2023	Critics' Choice Television Awards	Best Supporting Actress in a Comedy Series	Young Sheldon	Nominated
