= The Bounty Hunter (1989 film) =

1989 film directed by Robert Ginty

- Domestic release art
- Directed by: Robert Ginty
- Written by: Thomas Baldwin; Robert Ginty
- Produced by: Fritz Matthews; Kimberly Casey (additional photography)
- Starring: Robert Ginty; Bo Hopkins; Loeta Waterdown; Melvin Holt
- Production company: Action International Pictures
- Distributed by: A.I.P. Home Video (U.S.)
- Release date: August 27, 1989 (U.S.)
- Country: United States
- Language: English

The Bounty Hunter is a 1989 American neo-Western action film starring, co-written and directed by Robert Ginty, in his directorial debut. Bo Hopkins, Loeta Waterdown and Melvin Holt co-star. Ginty plays a bounty hunter who joins the struggle of Choctaw Indians against the cruel sheriff of their small town (Hopkins).

== Plot ==
In the southern town of Rock Springs, tensions have risen between whites and natives. The latter are blamed for the poor economy, as they refuse to sell access to their ancestral land to an oil company, depriving the community of much needed jobs. As a result, the natives are being extorted by the local sheriff, Bennett, and his closest men. A bounty hunter named Duke Evans comes into town, ostensibly to arrest a small-time thug named Jimmy Gibbons. But his confrontational tactics and unusually heavy armament soon attract the scrutiny of local patrolmen.

In actuality, Evans is a former military comrade of one of the natives, Thomas Foot, who had asked him to look after his loved ones if anything happened to him. Since then, Foot has gone missing, and is believed to have been murdered by Bennett's crew. Despite the sheriff's increasingly explicit threats, Evans settles down at a local motel. Teaming up with Thomas' sister Marion, the bounty hunter vows to rid Rock Springs of its crooked cops, and the rednecks they employ do to their bidding.

== Cast ==
- Robert Ginty as Duke Evans
- Bo Hopkins as Sheriff Bennett
- Loeta Waterdown as Marion Foot
- Melvin Holt as Kevin Foot
- John White as Barnes
- Robert Knott as Jimmy Gibbons
- Rex Linn as Policeman #1
- Jim Clark as Policeman #2
- Dave Lowry as Policeman #3
- Bill Buckner as Policeman #4
- Bill Kelly as Policeman #5
- Steven Rosich as Pool Hall Bartender

Although Bennett's dirty cops are not identified in the credits, the dialogue refers to them by names derived from those of their actors, i.e. Jimmy, Dave, Buck and Billy Bob. Other characters follow the same pattern. Local radio personality and comedian Barry Friedman appears as an oil executive.

== Production ==
=== Development ===
After several films together, David Winters, founder of Los Angeles-based A.I.P. Productions, understood Robert Ginty's need to grow past action roles. The modest project would allow him to try his hand at directing, as he was not yet sure if he would enjoy it. According to Variety, it was intended as a pilot for a potential TV series. In a retrospective interview, Ginty himself said that he had hoped the character would return in further movies, but did not specifically mention a TV series. According to some sources, the film was originally going to be set in the near future, and Mexico may have been considered as a location.

Ginty said that the story was inspired by real-life events, and that he strove to strike an even-handed tone in his portrayal of the film's racial strife. Buck, the senior member of Sheriff Bennett's inner circle, was originally corrupt like the others, but he was made more ambivalent in rewrites. According to producer Fritz Matthews, Oklahoma was eventually chosen due to the advantageous economic condition and the pro-activity of the state's Film Commission. The Bounty Hunter was the first of a projected five films to be shot in the state by A.I.P. Although the producers benefited from pictures sent by the film commission, location scouting was limited two days. Filfteen locales across four cities were pre-selected, although not all were visited, as the producers were satisfied that they had found most of the backdrops they needed around Sand Springs.

=== Casting ===
Bo Hopkins did The Bounty Hunter to honor his longtime friendship with Ginty. According to the latter, Hopkins' participation was key to securing financing for the film. Other that the two leads, the cast was largely local and sourced from a Tulsa-based casting director, Pam Whorton. It featured a number of Native Americans, including Loeta Waterdown and Melvin Holt. Stage actress Waterdown was hired on the eve of filming. One of the policemen was played by Jim Clark, a Sand Springs PD sergeant.

=== Filming ===
Principal photography took place in Oklahoma between late April and mid May 1988. Much of the crew was sourced locally, with a few key exceptions like cinematographer Robert Baldwin, who Ginty brought back from the Exterminator movies he had starred in. The stunt coordinator was Los Angeles-based Bob Ivy, who worked in collaboration with the Movie Stunts company of Tulsa. Sand Springs provided most key locations in the film, such as the public library which was transformed into a police station, and William R. Pogue Municipal Airport. The local criminal hangout was a composite of a bar in Sand Springs, and a pool hall in nearby Sapulpa. The pow wow was filmed on the Rogers State College campus in Claremore. The cast, schedule and storyline were withheld from the local press during filming to avoid attention. Some additional photography took place in Los Angeles.

=== Post-production ===
Although Ginty enjoyed his first directorial experience, he was dissatisfied with the picture's editing, as A.I.P. boss David Winters rarely exercised much control over post-production. As a result, he felt that some of its Western mood was lost.

== Release ==
=== Theatrical ===
The Bounty Hunter received theatrical exposure in some foreign markets, with sources indicating limited releases in France, via Metropolitan Filmexport, and Japan, via Humax, both in 1990.

=== Home media ===
In the U.S., the film premiered on tape through A.I.P. Home Video on August 27, 1989. It was offered in both an R-rated and an unrated version.

== Reception ==
The Variety reviewer credited as Lor. wrote that "Robert Ginty makes an underwhelming directorial debut in The Bounty Hunter, a routine vengeance feature". Ephraim Katz's Film Encyclopedia concurred, and assessed that Ginty "made an underwhelming debut as a director". Steven H. Scheuer's Movies on TV and Videocassette called it an "[u]nexceptional revenge tale". Ron Castell's Blockbuster Entertainment Guide to Movies and Videos called it "violent, predictable fare".

Despite Ginty's claims of a balanced narrative, M. Ray Lott, author of the book Police on Screen, found that "just to make sure where the sympathy lies, stereotypes are pulled out faster and more often than Ginty’s guns", as "whites are fat and uncouth" and "[drink] as much booze as possible", while the Indians "never provoke trouble, don't drink alcohol". He further noted that Confederate flags were standard in the film's white-owned businesses, while the Star-Spangled Banner was shown during the Indians' protest. The Psychotronic Video Guide To Film contended that the plot was lifted from 1947's Bad Day at Black Rock.

== Soundtrack ==
Some sources mention that the soundtrack features songs by such notable southern artists as Rita Coolidge and Stevie Ray Vaughan, but this may have been an unrealized project as they are not mentioned in the credits.
