= Robert Ginty =

American actor (1948–2009)

- Ginty in Hawaiian Heat, 1984
- Born: Robert Winthrop Ginty; November 14, 1948; Brooklyn, New York, U.S.
- Died: September 21, 2009 (aged 60); Los Angeles, California, U.S.
- Occupations: Actor; producer; director
- Years active: 1969–2006
- Known for: Thomas Craig Anderson in The Paper Chase
- Spouses: Francine Tacker (m. 1980; div. 1983) Lorna Patterson (m. 1983; div. 1989) Michelle Craske (m. 2003–2009)
- Children: James Francis Ginty

Robert Winthrop Ginty (November 14, 1948 – September 21, 2009) was an American actor, producer, screenwriter, and director. Born in Brooklyn, New York, Ginty took interest in the arts at a young age and went on to study acting at Yale University. Ginty worked in theatre until he moved to Hollywood in the mid-1970s. He started to play supporting roles on television and films, most notably a recurring role on the series The Paper Chase and two Hal Ashby films: Bound for Glory (1976) and Coming Home (1978). Ginty became an action film lead with his breakthrough role in James Glickenhaus's vigilante film The Exterminator (1980), which became a box-office success.

Up to the early 1990s Ginty acted in action oriented films such as The Act (1982), White Fire (1985), Mission Kill (1986), Programmed to Kill (1987), Out On Bail (1989). He also directed and starred in The Bounty Hunter (1989), Vietnam, Texas (1990) and Lady Dragon (1992). In the 1990s, Ginty focused on directing episodic television, including China Beach (1988), Xena: Warrior Princess (1995), Nash Bridges (1996), Charmed (1998), Tracker (2001), etc.

In the last decade of his life, Ginty, who died in 2009, became a theatre director and an artist in residence at Harvard University.

== Early life ==
Ginty was born in Brooklyn, New York, the son of Elsie M. (née O'Hara), a government worker, and Michael Joseph Ginty, a construction worker. He is of Irish descent and a direct descendant of the revolutionary Lord Edward Fitzgerald.

Ginty was involved with music from an early age, playing drums with Jimi Hendrix, Janis Joplin, Carlos Santana and John Lee Hooker. He studied at Yale and the City College of New York and trained at the Neighborhood Playhouse and the Actors Studio. Ginty worked in the regional theater circuit, and New York theatre on Broadway. Harold Prince hired him as his assistant after seeing him perform in The New Hampshire Shakespeare Festival Summerstock Company under the direction of Jon Ogden in 1973.

== Career ==
=== Mid 1970s to 1980: early roles to breakthrough ===
Ginty moved to California in the 1970s, where he found frequent work in various series in the mid-1970s.

In 1974, Ginty acted in And Baby Makes Three.

In 1976, Ginty acted in Larry Peerce's Two-Minute Warning, and Hal Ashby's Bound for Glory.

That year on television, he appeared in the NBC television movie John O'Hara's Gibbsville (also known as The Turning Point of Jim Malloy). He attained some popularity after finding a steady role starring with Robert Conrad in Baa Baa Black Sheep, a successful television series about the experiences of United States Marine Corps aviator Pappy Boyington and his squadron of misfits during World War II.

In 1978, Ginty worked again with director Ashby, in a supporting role in Coming Home starring Jane Fonda, Jon Voight, and Bruce Dern (a film which was nominated for eight Oscars). That year, he also appeared in John Llewellyn Moxey's television film The Courage and the Passion.

Around the time he had a recurring role in the series The Paper Chase (1978).

In 1980, Ginty starred in James Glickenhaus's vigilante film The Exterminator. The film is about two Vietnam veterans played by Steve James and Ginty, who live in the Bronx. James's character is attacked and paralyzed by a street gang, which turns Ginty's character into a vigilante. The film was a success grossing $35 million at the box office launching Ginty's career as an action film leading man.

That year on television, he acted in "To Your Health" an episode of CHiPs, and "The Accident" an episode of Diff'rent Strokes.

=== 1981 to 1989: Action film leading man, subsequent roles, and directorial debut ===
Moving forward, Ginty had the lead in many action movies including The Act (1982), White Fire (1984), Mission Kill (1986), Programmed to Kill (1987), Three Kinds of Heat (1987), Out On Bail (1989), Codename: Vengeance (1989), etc.

In 1984, he reprised his role in the sequel Exterminator 2. However the production was troubled, and the film was significantly re-shot and re-edited. The film didn't get good reviews.

During the 1980s he was a lead in the television series Hawaiian Heat. He also had recurring role in Simon & Simon, and Falcon Crest.

In 1989, Ginty starred and directed The Bounty Hunter. Also that year he acted in Joan Micklin Silver's Loverboy.

=== 1990 to 2009: Subsequent roles, directing for television, theatre and university work ===
In 1990, Ginty starred and directed in Vietnam, Texas. He also acted in Tom Ropelewski's comedy Madhouse.

In 1990, he appeared in "The Reasonable Doubt Mystery" an episode of The Father Dowling Mysteries.

In 1991, Ginty acted in Simon Wincer's Harley Davidson and the Marlboro Man.

Within his career, he became an independent producer/director, and formed his own production company, Ginty Films, buying shares in the special effects studio Introvision which distributed his vehicles both in the United States and abroad. Most were made on very limited budgets, but he had nevertheless done quite well for himself as a writer/producer/director, especially overseas, with such assembly-line fare as Gold Raiders (1983) which was filmed in Thailand, Cop Target (1990) which was shot in France, and Woman of Desire (1993).

Ginty continued in the late 1990s, performing, producing, and directing on such shows as China Beach (1988), Xena: Warrior Princess (1995), Nash Bridges (1996), Charmed (1998) and Tracker (2001).

In the last years of his life Ginty was a theatre director in Canada, France, Ireland and Italy. Furthermore, he was an artist in residence at Harvard University.

== Death ==
Ginty died of cancer in 2009 in Los Angeles, aged 60.

== Personal life ==
Ginty resided, variously, in Los Angeles, Dublin, Toronto, and Vancouver. He was married to actress and former co-star Francine Tacker; they had a son, actor James Francis Ginty.

Ginty had also been married to actress Lorna Patterson. Both Tacker and Patterson would work together in the short-lived situation comedy Goodtime Girls.

Ginty married Michelle Craske in 2003, they remained together until Ginty's death in 2009.

He began working with Narconon, a Scientology organization which provides drug rehabilitation, drug education and drug prevention programs, in 1979.
