= Exterminator 2 =

- Theatrical release poster
- Directed by: Mark Buntzman
- Written by: Mark Buntzman; William Sachs
- Produced by: Mark Buntzman; William Sachs
- Starring: Robert Ginty; Deborah Geffner; Frankie Faison; Mario Van Peebles
- Cinematography: Robert M. Baldwin; Joseph Mangine
- Edited by: Marcus Manton; George T. Norris; Florent Retz
- Music by: David Spear
- Production companies: The Cannon Group; Golan-Globus Productions
- Distributed by: Cannon Film Distributors
- Release date: September 14, 1984
- Running time: 89 minutes
- Country: United States
- Language: English
- Budget: $3 million
- Box office: $3.7 million

Exterminator 2 is a 1984 American vigilante action film written and directed by Mark Buntzman (with additional scenes directed by William Sachs), starring Robert Ginty, Mario Van Peebles, and Deborah Geffner, with cameos by Arye Gross in his debut role, and John Turturro in his second role. It is the sequel to the 1980 film The Exterminator.

== Plot ==
The film opens with a robbery of a liquor store by a group of well-armed young men, as an unseen man listens to a police scanner. That man, wearing a welding mask, suddenly appears behind the store as the men flee, incinerating two of them with a flamethrower. The survivors flee underground, revealing their membership in a street gang led by a charismatic man named X.

The film alternates scenes between John Eastland and X. Eastland develops a relationship with a dancer named Caroline. X announces his plans of leading the punk gang to rule the streets and the city. The gang robs an armored car and shoots down a police helicopter. A garbage truck passing by driven by Be Gee swerves into the crowd of gangsters, scattering them right before the police can arrive. The gang performs a torch-lit execution of the armored car driver in the subway, while X's brother is incinerated by the masked man. Later, the film then follows Eastland and Be Gee, Vietnam veterans, reuniting and driving around town in the garbage truck, visiting the bar where Caroline works, and splitting up as Eastland and Caroline take the garbage truck to Caroline's apartment. Simultaneously, a Mafioso visits the gang's lair in another torch-lit ceremony and offers to sell them heroin, the gang tests a sample on a randomly kidnapped victim, and discover the location of Caroline's home by recognizing the garbage truck.

On a following day, Eastland and Caroline visit a park. The gang attacks Caroline when Eastland is distracted, beating her badly and paralyzing her legs. Eastland and Be Gee discuss crime later in that bar. The masked man appears in an alley and incinerates two more gangsters. Later on, Caroline and Eastland fight, and Eastland finally brings up vigilante justice with Be Gee. They arm themselves, ambush a group of gangsters in a park, and torture information out of one gangster. Eastland and Be Gee attack one of the gang's warehouses, only to discover that they were interrupting a drug sale between X and the Mafioso. In the ensuing firefight, Be Gee is killed by X, the Mafioso and his crew are blown up along with the money, and Eastland steals the heroin. In retaliation, the gang murders Caroline while Eastland mourns over Be Gee.

Vowing revenge, Eastland installs improvised armor on the garbage truck, while strapping machine guns and antitank rockets to the sides and top. A final showdown ensues in a factory, where Eastland kills most of the gangsters with the armored garbage truck, and incinerates the survivors with a flamethrower. X then chases Eastland around the factory, wounding him in the process and capturing the bag of heroin. The bag explodes, killing X, leaving Eastland to walk away alone from the wreckage.

== Cast ==
- Robert Ginty as John Eastland
- Mario Van Peebles as "X", Gang Leader
- Deborah Geffner as Caroline, Friend of Eastland
- Frankie Faison as "Be Gee"
- Scott Randolf as "Eyes"
- Reggie Rock Bythewood as "Spider"
- Bruce Smolanoff as "Red Hat"
- David Buntzman as Head Mafioso
- Kenny Marino as Tony
- Derek Evans as "Squealer"
- Irwin Keyes as "Monster"
- Robert Louis King as Philo
- Arye Gross as "Turbo"
- Janet Rotblatt as Mom
- Ron Taylor as Dude

== Production ==
Exterminator 2 had a very troubled production which included budget problems, heavy re-editing and reshoots, and censorship issues. The Cannon Group studio was not pleased with director Mark Buntzman's original rough cut of the film, so they hired film doctor William Sachs to do extensive reshoots in Los Angeles to improve it.

In a 2012 interview about his work, Sachs talked about the reshoots on Exterminator 2. He was the one who came up with idea of the Exterminator wearing the flame proof mask throughout the movie:

Bob Ginty was supposed to be doing another movie and they wouldn't release him. I said, 'I'll fix it so you don't need him.' I couldn't get any other stars, so that's where I came up with the idea. There's one shot of Ginty with the welding mask working on the garbage truck, and he lifts his mask and has a little torch. So I just used that shot at the end. I turned him into a vigilante with a welding mask for the whole rest of the movie.

— William Sachs, about working on Exterminator 2

Because of the budget problems, the movie had to be reshot in Los Angeles:

They started shooting in New York, and they went so far over budget that they moved it to LA. They spent double their budget, it was supposed to be $1.5 million and they got to $3 million and they'd shot like 40 minutes. I had been working on the movie in New York as a co-producer. So I brought it to LA, and I had to ship the garbage truck from New York, because the ones in New York are metal and the ones in LA are fiberglass, because of the weight restrictions. We got permission. We have scenes where [the truck] goes around the corner of one street in New York, and the other's in LA. We threw garbage in the streets and painted the curbs in LA a different color, to make it look like New York.

— William Sachs, about working on Exterminator 2

Sachs also mentioned that production's initial struggles were probably due to Buntzman's inexperience handling a large film crew:

I was in New York just to watch, and I saw what was going wrong. If you can't make a decision, everyone starts giving you their two cents until it's a committee. Mark Buntzman couldn't make a certain decision, so the script supervisor had an idea and the DP had an idea, and soon there was a meeting going on. A directing lesson: if someone asks 'Where do I point the camera?' you just point. The first thing that comes into your head, you just say "there". Nine times out of ten, it's the right place. And if it's not, you say later, 'Well, I thought about it and it'd be better over here'. But if you don't give an answer, you lose them.

— William Sachs, about working on Exterminator 2

According to Sachs, the character of X got his name due to more indecisiveness from Buntzman, who could not think of a better name. It was also Sachs' idea to make the character more central.

Even in post-production, the film met with some troubles. The MPAA made Sachs cut down an early gory scene in which an elderly couple is shot up by the gang:

I'm not really excited about violent stuff. When you're shooting it, it's fun, but something a little more realistic affects people. When we shot that scene, the DP said it was the most realistic thing he ever saw. The squib and the gun went off in the same frame. It was timed perfectly, by luck, and you don't usually see that. We had six shots and ended up with one quick shot.

— William Sachs, about working on Exterminator 2

In the interview Sachs also had a funny anecdote about the casting of Arye Gross, who played gang member Turbo in the movie: "He came in and read for me, and he was talking like Marlon Brando, through his nose. It was fantastic, so I gave him the part. And when we did the scene, he didn't talk like that. I said, 'You're not talking like you did in your reading!' And he said, 'I had a cold'".

Sachs tried to get co-director credit for his work on Exterminator 2 but wound up accepting a co-writer and "additional scenes directed by" credit due to a legal battle with Buntzman.

=== Reshoots ===
The original script for the film was very different to the one released; several original scenes were removed and new scenes were filmed to cobble a different storyline together. Some of the original scenes are in the wrong order, for example the exterminator goes to Caroline's home early in the film but then travels in the garbage truck with her later in the film where Caroline is wearing the outfit from the previous scene in the movie.

Ginty couldn't return for reshoots for the scenes in which John wears a fireproof mask and burns down the gang members with a flamethrower. Those scenes were filmed with Robert Ginty's stunt double. Originally the only scene where John used the flamethrower to kill the gang members was in the ending when he burns the last few after he already killed most of the others with weapons from the garbage truck. A double was used for scenes where his face is not seen and the most obvious scene is when he phones Caroline and then runs to her home to find her dead. Deborah Geffner wasn't asked to return as Caroline because all her scenes would have been with Ginty, so a body double was used for the shot of her nude dead body. Mario Van Peebles and Frankie Faison did return for the reshoots.

The original rough cut of the film has never been released.

== Alternative or missing scenes ==
The theatrical trailer shows the following deleted and alternate scenes from the original rough cut of the movie:

- Nightclub explosion scene that happens after the gang shoots down a police helicopter which crashes on it. The helicopter pilot is shown burning a little longer while he tries to get out of the burning helicopter. There is also a shot of a wounded John looking at this helplessly.
- John and Caroline trying to help someone who got hurt during the explosion by pressing something on his wound.
- X pointing at something and screaming while standing on an armored car.
- X and John see each other for the first time face to face and X points his finger at John. This scene happened after the helicopter crash and club explosion. Originally there was a part where John and Be Gee try to stop gang members from robbing the armored car with Be Gee chasing them in his garbage truck and John fighting with them on the street.
- Chase scene between Be Gee's garbage truck and the armored car driven by gang members. Originally this scene happened after the gang shoots down the helicopter.
- Completely deleted club explosion scene and John's fight with gang members on the street.
- Another deleted garbage truck chase scene. John and Caroline are driving in the garbage truck, but they are attacked by gang members who jump on the sides of the truck. John manages to get rid of one when he slams him into the light pole or something.
- Differently edited dialogue scene in the club between John and Be Gee.
- A couple of more extra shots from the scene when gang members attack Caroline while she is with John in the park.
- Alternative mirrored shot of X shooting at Be Gee.

Some lobby cards and stills also show several scenes cut from the movie:

- John looking at wounded and dead people inside the club after the helicopter crashes on it and explodes.
- Caroline helping someone who got injured in the same deleted club explosion scene.
- John throwing the wheel cap on one of the gang members, who jumps onto Be Gee's garbage truck when he tries to stop the gang members from stealing the armored car.
- After the armored car robbery and his fight with the gang members, John escapes from the police and is hiding somewhere while his head is covered with blood due to the injury he got during the club explosion.
- Caroline taking care of John's head wound.
- Longer version of the scene where X and his gang members attack Caroline in the park.
- Some lobby cards show pictures from the original ending with John and X fighting with each other next to the garbage truck and the wounded X kneeling on the ground while some cop is pointing his shotgun at him.

== Alternative/original ending ==
The original ending in the rough cut of the movie was different, Instead of the chase scene between John and X in the factory, both of them confront each other after John kills all of X's gang members and get into a fight. X almost kills John, but Caroline shows up in her wheelchair (she did not die in the original cut, the scenes where John finds her dead body were also filmed during reshoots with Geffner's and Ginty's stand-ins) and shoots X, wounding him. When the police shows up, John puts X into the garbage truck and the chase starts between him in his truck and the police cars. The chase ends with John crashing the garbage truck into the river and X's dead body floating out of it. Some behind the scenes footage included in an old making-of documentary shows the filming of the fight scene between John and X in the original ending, sadly the garbage truck driving off a bridge into a river was never filmed because of the expense.

A shot of John taking his mask off in the ending after X dies is actually an outtake edited from the original scene the exterminator flames gang members at the end of the movie, which is why the scene cuts abruptly when he starts taking the mask off, this scene can actually be seen in the "making of" TV special for "Exterminator 2". According to some interview from the time when the movie was released, Ginty hated the way the movie was cut down and re-edited by the studio.

== Workprints ==
The 2 workprints of Exterminator 2 are extreme rough cuts and are of poor quality as they came from VHS tapes.

The first earlier workprint is after production of the movie was shut down, the original story is complete with the nightclub explosion, Caroline survives and is in a wheel chair for the 3rd act but also suffers from a lack of footage filmed as it has title cards explaining missing scenes and also no ending, this cut is only 58 minutes long.

The second workprint is a later cut while the reshoots were still taking place, this cut seems to be trying to complete the story from the original script while adding more action using the stunt double for the flame thrower scenes and the new ending that was still not yet complete as the explosion scene with the bag isn't included, instead X simply falls to his death with some very blurry footage and in this version a stunt double is standing over X with his welding mask down as Robert Ginty was not available for filming. In this version Caroline dies same as the theatrical cut. Even with the new content this cut is only 67 minutes long.

The theatrical cut follows a different story while trying to use the same footage.

== Release ==
In various countries more scenes were cut just to meet the R rating (or 18 rating), earlier VHS and DVDs were heavily edited, especially in the UK releases.

In the early 90s a VCD release of Exterminator 2 includes various scenes not in any other cut.

In September 2016, 101 Film released "THE UNCUT" Version of Exterminator 2 on Blu-ray – this version includes all of the previously removed edits for violence and 1 scene removed for their violent content for the UK release but does not change the story.

Shout! Factory released Exterminator 2 as part of a four-film "Action-Packed Movie Marathon" DVD set on March 19, 2013.

== Reception ==
Exterminator 2 received negative critical reviews. The film holds a 0% rating on Rotten Tomatoes based on 5 reviews.
