= Goodtime Girls =

- Genre: Sitcom
- Created by: Leonora Thuna; Thomas L. Miller; Robert L. Boyett
- Developed by: Sheldon Bull; E.J. Purdum; Leonard Ripps
- Starring: Annie Potts; Lorna Patterson; Georgia Engel; Francine Tacker; Marcia Lewis; Merwin Goldsmith; Peter Scolari; Adrian Zmed; Sparky Marcus
- Theme music composer: Norman Gimbel; Charles Fox
- Opening theme: "When Everyone Cared"
- Composers: Charles Fox; John Beal
- Country of origin: United States
- No. of seasons: 1
- No. of episodes: 13 (1 unaired)

Production
- Executive producer: Garry Marshall
- Producers: Thomas L. Miller; Edward K. Milkis; Robert L. Boyett
- Running time: 30 minutes
- Production companies: Miller-Milkis-Boyett Productions; Paramount Television

Original release
- Network: ABC
- Release: January 22 – August 29, 1980

Goodtime Girls is an American sitcom that ran on ABC from January 22 to August 29, 1980. It was created by Leonora Thuna, and produced by Thomas L. Miller, Edward K. Milkis and Robert L. Boyett, in association with Garry Marshall's Henderson Productions and Paramount Television. It is a period piece comedy set during World War II, which was the producers' 1940s answer to their top 1950s-themed hits Happy Days and Laverne & Shirley.

== Synopsis ==
Set in Washington, D.C., in 1942, Goodtime Girls told the story of four women who found themselves having to share a small attic apartment at the Coolidge Boarding House, due to a regional apartment shortage, which occurred as a result of women striking out on their own and supporting themselves during wartime. In the beginning, three of the girls; Edith Bedelmeyer (Annie Potts), Sioux City native Betty Crandall (Lorna Patterson), and Loretta Smoot (Georgia Engel)--had agreed to share space together in the attic at Coolidge. However, just when they thought things couldn't get more cramped, Camille Rittenhouse (Francine Tacker), a snobbish reporter who was covering a newspaper story on the apartment shortage, wound up being their fourth roommate when she herself lost her apartment and was in need of a new place. This didn't immediately sit well with the other women, not only because of the tight quarters barely accommodating four, but since Camille's holier-than-thou personality clashed with the others, especially with Edith, who became the unofficial leader of the group. The gang did learn to get along, as they grew closer in a time when a lot of emotional and moral support was needed for each other, with America working on "getting Uncle Sam out of a jam".

The ladies also had a lot of fun things to look forward to; despite the shortage of consumer goods, cars, and men, many soldiers and sailors on military leave passed through to romance them. Edith and Betty, who were younger and single, were most frequently sought after by these bachelors. Loretta was the middle-aged war bride, who was holding out hope for her husband's safe return. Then there were two resident single men in the building, macho hustler cabbie Frankie Millardo (Adrian Zmed), who lived downstairs with his buddy Benny Loman (Peter Scolari), a street performer whose pantomime, juggling and unicycle acts were part of the regular physical comedy and pratfalls seen in every episode. Frankie, who had been the one who drove Betty, Edith and Loretta to the boarding house, wants to prove himself by joining the military but is turned down because he has flat feet. Frankie and Benny often joined in the girls' escapades, escorting them around town and engaging in periodic jitterbug and big band dance sessions. With play came work: Edith was employed at the Office of Price Admissions, as mentioned, Camille was a newspaper reporter, Betty worked for the U.S. Secretary of War, and Loretta, at The Pentagon for bureaucrat General Culpepper (seen in guest appearances by Richard Stahl).

The boarding house was run by its namesakes, George and Irma Coolidge (Merwin Goldsmith and Marcia Lewis), a married couple who controlled their units very strictly. Also seen around was Skeeter (Sparky Marcus), a young boy who spent a lot of time with the Coolidges.

== Cast ==
- Annie Potts as Edith Bedelmeyer
- Merwin Goldsmith as George Coolidge
- Lorna Patterson as Betty Crandall
- Adrian Zmed as Frankie Molardo
- Georgia Engel as Loretta Smoot
- Francine Tacker as Camille Rittenhouse
- Marcia Lewis as Irma Coolidge
- Peter Scolari as Benny Lohman

== Cast Notes ==
Marcia Lewis (Irma Coolidge) had previously worked with Garry Marshall on his short-lived 1978 sitcom Who's Watching the Kids?, while Peter Scolari (Benny Loman) would ultimately go on to work with Miller, Milkis and Boyett on their separate venture, Bosom Buddies, on ABC in the fall of 1980.

Lorna Patterson (Betty Crandall) worked with Francine Tacker (Camille Rittenhouse), who was married to the man Lorna herself would later marry, actor Robert Ginty.

Although not playing the same characters, actors from the Marshall-produced shows Happy Days and Laverne & Shirley, respectively, guest starred on Goodtime Girls. Scott Baio appeared in one episode as Edith's younger brother who decided to enlist for the war. Michael McKean guest starred in another as a war veteran who was recovering in a local Washington, D.C., hospital after losing his legs in battle.

== Scheduling ==
Goodtime Girls premiered in January 1980 on Tuesday nights, immediately following Happy Days, of which this series, unlike others produced by Garry Marshall and Miller/Milkis/Boyett, was not spun off from or in any ways connected to, storyline-wise. ABC kept the show on through the end of February sweeps, but then pulled it off the schedule for over a month until it returned in April, when it then aired for three consecutive weeks in a Saturday 8:30/7:30c slot. The show was then taken off again, and since it garnered small audiences during both these runs, the network officially canceled the show during May 1980 upfronts. Five more original episodes were burned off on Fridays at 8:30/7:30c that August, leading up to the final produced episode's broadcast on August 29, 1980. The series' third episode ("Night and Day") was the only one that ABC chose not to air during its run, for unexplained reasons.

== Episodes ==
No.	Title	Directed by	Written by	Original release date
1	"Homefront"	Unknown	Unknown	January 22, 1980
2	"Too Many Fiances"	Howard Storm	William Bickley & Michael Warren	January 29, 1980
3	"Frankie Gets Drafted, Almost"	Unknown	Leonard Ripps	February 5, 1980
4	"Frankie and Edith Were Lovers"	Unknown	Unknown	February 12, 1980
5	"Growing Pains"	Unknown	Ken Estin	April 12, 1980
Scott Baio guest stars as Tommy
6	"Loose Lips"	Unknown	Unknown	April 19, 1980
7	"Edith Dates a War Hero"	Unknown	Unknown	April 26, 1980
8	"Loretta's Dilemma"	Unknown	Unknown	August 1, 1980
9	"Internal Injury"	Unknown	Unknown	August 8, 1980
10	"The Show Must Go On"	Unknown	Unknown	August 15, 1980
11	"Who's Benny?"	Unknown	Unknown	August 22, 1980
12	"Sing 'Til It Hurts"	Unknown	Leonard Ripps	August 29, 1980
13	"All for One" (also known as "Night and Day")	TBD	TBD	N/A

== Home media ==
While the series has not been released on DVD, it was shown in reruns in either the late 1990s or early 2000s on TV Land, although it is unclear if the entire series was shown. Several episodes can be found on the internet and YouTube channels, as well as opening and closing credits recorded from both the ABC and TV Land airings.
