= Mark Buntzman =

American actor (1949–2018)

Mark Buntzman (July 31, 1949 – June 8, 2018) was the film director, writer, producer and actor of the cult classic movie Exterminator 2. He was also the producer of its predecessor The Exterminator. Other than those two movies, he hasn't produced, directed, or written any other prominent films. He did, though, have a cameo in the 1993 movie Posse as Deputy Buntzman, as well as playing a reporter in the 1995 movie Panther. Both movies starred Mario Van Peebles, who also played a large role in Exterminator 2.

== Filmography ==
Year	Title	Role	Notes
1975	Suicide Cult	Kajerste	Producer
1980	The Exterminator	Burping Ghoul	Producer
1984	Exterminator 2	Member of X's Gang	Uncredited; Producer, Director, Writer
1993	Posse	Deputy Buntzman	
1995	Panther	Pushy reporter	
1998	Love Kills	The Accountant	Producer
1999	Standing Knockdown		Producer
