= Vetsploitation =

Film genre about an ex-military fighter as a key character

Vetsploitation is a film genre and term used to describe exploitation films in which a military veteran is the main element to the plot.

== Background ==
The vetsploitation genre developed in the 1960-1970s, as B movies featuring veterans who were misunderstood or vilified and became post-Vietnam "freaked-out loser" antiheroes. Aspects of American vetsploitation films were paralleled by Russian media inspired by the Soviet–Afghan War.

== Notable films ==
- 1967: The Born Losers
- 1968: Targets
- 1970: Hi, Mom!
- 1971: Billy Jack
- 1972: Skyjacked
- 1973: The No Mercy Man
- 1974: Earthquake
- 1976: Taxi Driver
- 1976: Tracks
- 1976: Vigilante Force
- 1977: Black Sunday
- 1977: The Farmer
- 1977: Rolling Thunder
- 1978: Coming Home
- 1978: Who'll Stop the Rain
- 1979: Bush Mama
- 1980: Don't Answer the Phone
- 1980: The Exterminator
- 1980: Cannibal Apocalypse
- 1980: The Ninth Configuration
- 1982: Forced Vengeance
- 1982: Firefox
- 1982: First Blood
- 1985: Thou Shalt Not Kill... Except
- 1985: Year of the Dragon
- 1985: Rambo: First Blood Part II
- 1987: Lethal Weapon
- 1987: Suspect
- 1988: Braddock: Missing in Action III
- 1988: Rambo III
- 1989: Born on the Fourth of July
- 1990: Jacob's Ladder
- 1992: Universal Soldier
- 1994: Forrest Gump
- 1996: The Substitute
- 1996: The War at Home
- 1997: Ulee's Gold

== See also ==
- New Hollywood
- Counterculture of the 1960s
- PTSD
