= Francine Tacker =

American actress

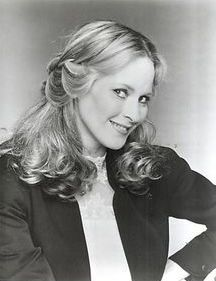
- Other name: Francine Ginty
- Occupation: Actress
- Years active: 1975–1995
- Known for: The Paper Chase; Goodtime Girls
- Spouse: Robert Ginty (m. 1980; div. 1983)
- Children: James Francis Ginty

Francine Tacker is a retired American actress known for appearing as Jenna Wade in two episodes of the soap opera Dallas in 1980.

== Career ==
Tacker was the second actress to play the character, succeeding Morgan Fairchild and preceding Priscilla Presley. She was also a regular on the television series The Paper Chase, playing Elizabeth Logan during the 1978–1979 season and on Empire in 1984. In 1980, she played reporter Camille Rittenhouse, a woman who shared an attic apartment with three other women, on the short-lived comedy series, Goodtime Girls.

== Personal life ==
She was married to actor Robert Ginty, whom she met during filming of The Paper Chase. Their son is actor James Francis Ginty. On Goodtime Girls, she worked with Ginty's second wife, actress Lorna Patterson (she played Betty Crandall to Francine's Camille).

== Filmography ==
=== Television ===
Year	Title	Role	Notes
1975	Ryan's Hope	Dr. Gloria Tassky	
1979	Mrs. Columbo	Sister Janice	Episode: "A Puzzle for Prophets"
1978-1979	The Paper Chase	Elizabeth Logan	21 episodes
1979	Angie	Karen Anders	Episode: "Harvey's Mother"
1980	Dallas	Jenna Wade	Episode: "Jenna's Return; Episode: "Sue Ellen's Choice"
1980	The Associates	Susan Warren	Episode: "Danko's a Daddy"
1980	Goodtime Girls	Camille Rittenhouse	13 episodes
1983	Oh Madeline	Annie McIntyre	8 episodes
1984	Empire	Amelia Lapidus	4 episodes
1984	The Bounder	Laura Spencer	television film
1986	Valerie	Caroline	Episode: "Old Enough"
