= Love Kills (film) =

- DVD cover
- Directed by: Mario Van Peebles
- Written by: Mario Van Peebles
- Produced by: Mario Van Peebles; Mark Buntzman
- Starring: Mario Van Peebles; Lesley Ann Warren; Daniel Baldwin
- Edited by: Edward R. Abroms
- Music by: Nick Wood
- Production company: Van Peebles Films
- Distributed by: Ardustry Home Entertainment; Trident Releasing
- Release dates: May 21, 1998 (Cannes); October 4, 1999 (UK video); June 6, 2000 (U.S. DVD)
- Running time: 91 minutes
- Country: United States
- Language: English

Love Kills is a 1998 American crime thriller film written and directed by Mario Van Peebles. The film stars Van Peebles, Lesley Ann Warren, and Daniel Baldwin.

== Plot ==
A masseur gets mixed up in the family plots at the mansion of a recently deceased Beverly Hills millionaire.

== Cast ==
- Mario Van Peebles as Poe Finklestein
- Lesley Ann Warren as Evelyn Heiss
- Donovan Leitch as Dominique
- Loretta Devine as Sylvia Finkelstein
- Louise Fletcher as Alena Heiss
- Daniel Baldwin as Danny Tucker
- Robert LaSardo as Diesel
- Alexis Arquette as James
- Sen Dog as Derrick
- Lucy Liu as Kashi
- Susan Ruttan as Lela
- Melvin Van Peebles as Abel
- Mark Buntzman as the accountant
- Michael Winters as the lawyer
- Philip Moon as the rookie cop
- Vincent Schiavelli as Emmet
- Margaret Avery as Moon
- Steve Moore as Stephen
- James Pax as rookie cop #2
- Sattya Sukhu as male servant
- Chittra Sukhu as lawyer #2
- Fatlip as rapper
- Kailani Bayot as Kashi's friend
- Maria Marx as woman in the desert

== Reception ==
On Variety, Emanuel Levy wrote that "Love Kills, might have been an entertaining farce about the rich and wannabe rich in Beverly Hills, but severely flawed pic lacks an intelligent script and a unifying directorial touch." On The Guardian, Rob Mackie wrote that the film is "freewheeling and frisky thriller (...) has fun but Van Peebles tries to pack in a bit too much."
