= Oh Madeline =

- Genre: Sitcom
- Based on: Pig in the Middle by Terence Brady & Charlotte Bingham
- Developed by: Tom Werner; Marcy Carsey
- Directed by: J.D. Lobue
- Starring: Madeline Kahn; James Sloyan; Louis Giambalvo; Jesse Welles; Francine Tacker
- Composers: Dan Foliart; Howard Pearl
- Country of origin: United States
- Original language: English
- No. of seasons: 1
- No. of episodes: 18

Production
- Executive producers: Tom Werner; Marcy Carsey
- Producers: Irma Kalish; Madeline Kahn
- Running time: 30 minutes
- Production company: Carsey-Werner Productions

Original release
- Network: ABC
- Release: September 27, 1983 – March 13, 1984

Related
- Pig in the Middle

Oh Madeline is an American sitcom television series starring Madeline Kahn that aired on ABC from September 27, 1983, to March 13, 1984. It was based on the British sitcom Pig in the Middle that aired on ITV from 1980 until 1983.

== Overview ==
The show revolves around Madeline Wayne, a housewife bored after 10 years of marriage to Charlie, a sweet but staid man who makes his living writing steamy romance novels under the name Crystal Love. Madeline's best friend is Doris, a timid divorcee previously married to Charlie's best friend, a middle-aged swinger named Bob. Annie is Charlie's amorous editor.

Madeline, bored with her predictable, sedate existence in a middle-class suburb, and wanting to put some zest back in into her life, decides to try every trendy diversion that she can find - such as seaweed-based health foods, exercise clubs, and "ladies only" clubs featuring male strippers.

The show contained a lot of slapstick comedy, as well as marital misunderstandings in the tradition of I Love Lucy. The show is notable as the first television show produced by Carsey-Werner Productions, which would go on to produce numerous sitcoms with comedians as leads over the next several decades. Kahn would work with Carsey-Werner again on Cosby (which was also based on a British sitcom One Foot in the Grave) in 1996 until her death in 1999.

== Cast ==
- Madeline Kahn as Madeline Wayne
- James Sloyan as Charlie Wayne
- Louis Giambalvo as Robert Leone
- Jesse Welles as Doris Leone
- Francine Tacker as Annie McIntyre
- Randee Heller as Faye

== Episodes ==
No.	Title	Directed by	Written by	Original release date
1	"That Was No Lady"	J.D. Lobue	Irma Kalish	September 27, 1983
Madeline creates a mess when she is trapped in the bathroom of Doris's ex-husband during a clandestine mission to help Doris retrieve her diary.
2	"Mummy Dearest"	J.D. Lobue	Neal Marlens	October 4, 1983
At a masquerade party, Doris accuses Madeline of flirting with her husband when she mistakes him for Charlie in a mummy costume.
3	"Portrait of the Artist with a Young Man"	J.D. Lobue	Unknown	October 18, 1983
Madeline signs up for a pottery class and befriends a young student, Tony (Franc Luz), unaware of his amorous intentions.
4	"All the World's a Stage"	J.D. Lobue	Unknown	October 25, 1983
Madeline tries to convince a new friend that her acting partner at the community playhouse is actually her husband.
5	"Book of Love"	J.D. Lobue	Bruce Ferber & David Lerner	November 1, 1983
Madeline is shocked to find Charlie in a romantic pose with an actress (Trisha Noble) whose memoirs recount her long-ago affair with him.
6	"To Ski or Not to Ski"	J.D. Lobue	Cindy Begel & Lesa Kite	November 8, 1983
After she forces a reluctant Charlie to go on a ski weekend together, Madeline tries to keep him from finding out that she has injured her ankle in a skiing accident.
7	"Madeline Acts Forward at the Retreat"	J.D. Lobue	Unknown	November 22, 1983
After Madeline criticizes an egotistical novelist (Jeffrey Tambor), he becomes passionately obsessed with her.
8	"Chances Are"	J.D. Lobue	Cindy Begel and Lesa Kite	November 29, 1983
Madeline believes that singer Johnny Mathis is actually a celebrity impersonator that Robert hired to perform at her high school reunion.
9	"The Write Stuff"	J.D. Lobue	Barton Dean	December 6, 1983
Madeline ropes Doris into a wacky plan to retrieve every copy of a newspaper edition that she believes contains an article that is damaging to Charlie's career.
10	"Sisters"	J.D. Lobue	Richard Rosenstock & Roy Teicher, Barton Dean & Neal Marlens	December 13, 1983
Madeline's long-lost sister Joyce (Melanie Chartoff) comes to visit and sets her romantic sights on Robert and Charlie.
11	"Ah, Wilderness"	J.D. Lobue	Robert Sternin & Prudence Fraser	January 3, 1984
Madeline and Charlie end up in jail when they help an innocent-looking man while on a camping trip.
12	"Monday Night Madeline"	J.D. Lobue	Barton Dean	January 10, 1984
Madeline becomes personally involved in a wrestling match after landing a job as a television sports commentator.
13	"The Lady and the Lamp"	J.D. Lobue	Richard Rosenstock & Roy Teicher, Barton Dean & Neal Marlens	January 17, 1984
Madeline panics when she wakes up in Robert's bed with a hangover and no recollection of what happened the night before.
14	"Things That Go Bump in the Night"	J.D. Lobue	Lisa A. Bannick	January 24, 1984
Madeline makes a valiant effort to protect Robert from his girlfriend's jealous ex-boyfriend on the same night a burglar strikes.
15	"My Mother the Carnal"	J.D. Lobue	Neal Marlens	January 31, 1984
Madeline is shocked when she discovers her prim-and-proper mother (Geraldine Fitzgerald) had an affair with a stand-up comedian (Bill Macy) several years ago.
16	"Ladies' Night Out"	J.D. Lobue	Austin & Irma Kalish	February 21, 1984
On a night out with Doris and Faye, Madeline dances with male strippers and then loses a fortune in money at a gambling casino.
17	"Play Crystal for Me"	J.D. Lobue	Robert Sternin & Prudence Fraser, Barton Dean & Neal Marlens	February 28, 1984
Madeline disguises herself as a flamboyant author so she can appear on a TV talk show with a competing romance novelist (Charles Ludlam), who is a man posing as a woman.
18	"A Little Fight Music"	J.D. Lobue	Robert Sternin & Prudence Fraser	March 13, 1984
Faye invites Madeline to perform in a concert staged by the community theater, but Madeline gets stage fright and is unable to sing during the audition.

== US ratings ==
Season	Episodes	Start date	End date	Nielsen rank	Nielsen rating
1983-84	18	September 27, 1983	March 13, 1984	50	15.1 (Note: Tied with Diff'rent Strokes and Matt Houston)

== Syndication ==
Oh Madeline briefly aired on USA Network in the early 1990s. An attempt to revive the show as The Madeline Kahn Show was proposed by Metromedia Producers Corporation for the 1985–1986 season, but the deal never happened.

== Awards and nominations ==
Kahn was nominated for a Golden Globe Award for Best Actress in a Comedy Series in 1984, losing to Joanna Cassidy for the series Buffalo Bill.
