= Bo Hopkins =

American actor (1938–2022)

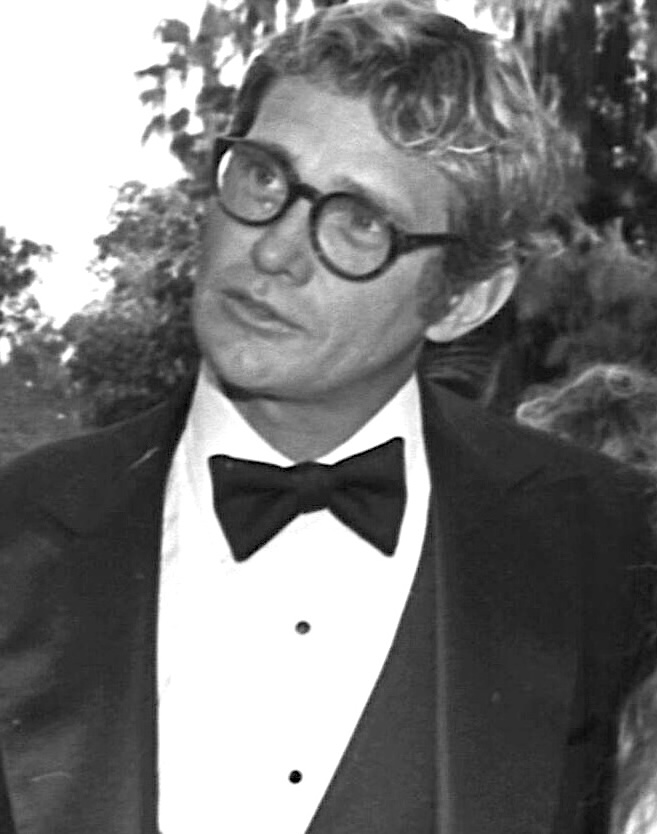
- Hopkins in 1981
- Born: William Mauldin Hopkins; February 2, 1938; Greenville, South Carolina, U.S.
- Died: May 28, 2022 (aged 84); Van Nuys, California, U.S.
- Occupation: Actor
- Years active: 1966–2006; 2013–2020
- Spouses: Norma Woodle (m. 1959; div. 1962); Sian Eleanor Green (m. 1989)
- Children: 2

William Mauldin "Bo" Hopkins (February 2, 1938 – May 28, 2022) was an American actor. He was known for playing supporting roles in several major studio films from 1969 to 1979, especially for his breakout role in the ensemble cast of George Lucas' American Graffiti. His credits span numerous films and TV appearances.

== Early life ==
William Hopkins was born in Greenville, South Carolina on February 2, 1938. At the age of nine months, he was adopted by a couple who were unable to conceive. Growing up, he was called "Billy." His adoptive father worked in a mill in Taylors, South Carolina. When his father was 39, he died of a heart attack on the porch of the family's home. Billy and his mother witnessed his death. Unable to remain in their house, a month later the two of them moved to a new residence in nearby Ware Shoals, where his grandfather and uncles worked in another mill. His mother eventually remarried a man whose last name was Davis. Hopkins did not get along with his new stepfather; the two got into numerous arguments, some serious. After running away from home a few times, he was sent to live with his grandparents, and while there he learned that he had been adopted because his adoptive mother could not bear children. At age 12, he met his birth mother who lived with his half-sisters and a half-brother in Lockhart, another small mill town in South Carolina.

Billy led a troubled life as a youngster, with numerous instances of truancy, minor crimes, and a stay in a reform school. He dropped out of school just before his 17th birthday and joined the U.S. Army, where he was assigned to the 101st Airborne Division. He was based at Fort Jackson, Fort Gordon, and Fort Pope, before being shipped off to Korea, where he served for nine months.

== Career ==
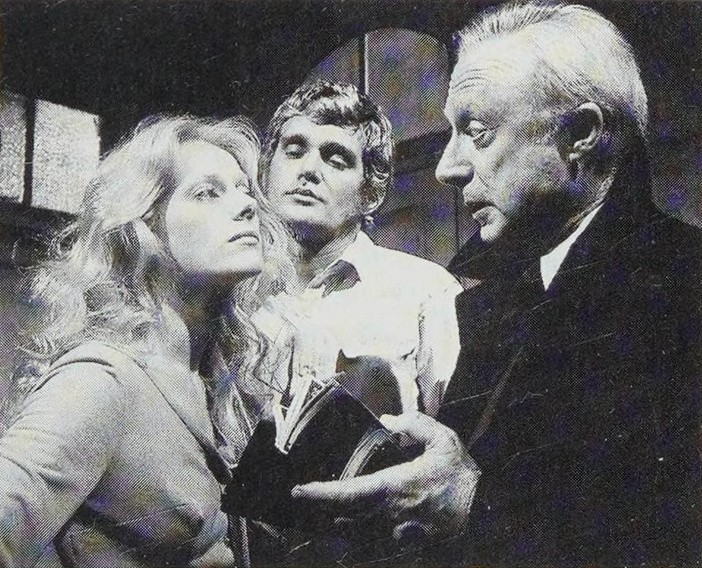
With Sondra Locke and Norman Lloyd in Gondola (1973)

After completing his military service, Hopkins began performing in local theater productions in Kentucky and won a scholarship at the Pioneer Playhouse in Danville, where he acted in summer stock theater. Explaining in a 2012 magazine interview how he got his first name "Bo," he said:

William Hopkins is my real name. Billy when I was growing up. When I went to New York, Bus Stop was my first off-Broadway play, and the character that I played was named Bo. The producers wanted me to change my name, and since I wanted to keep my last name, we agreed to change the first. That's how it became Bo.

— Bo Hopkins, Shock Cinema, "An Interview with Actor Bo Hopkins", Number 42, June 2012

Hopkins further studied acting at the Actors Studio in Los Angeles, and later at Desilu-Cahuenga Studios under Uta Hagen.

Hopkins appeared in more than 100 film and television roles in a career of more than 40 years, including the major studio films The Wild Bunch (1969), The Bridge at Remagen (1969), The Getaway (1972), American Graffiti (1973), The Man Who Loved Cat Dancing (1973), The Killer Elite (1975), Posse (1975), The Day of the Locust (1975), A Small Town in Texas (1976), Midnight Express (1978), and More American Graffiti (1979). His final film, Hillbilly Elegy, was directed by his long-time friend Ron Howard and released in 2020.

After Hopkins' first roles in major films in the early 1970s he appeared in White Lightning (1973). Hopkins played Roy Boone. Jerry Reed and Hopkins played brothers Joe Hawkins and Tom Hawkins in the 1985 film What Comes Around.

Hopkins starred or co-starred in many made-for-television movies of the mid-1970s, including Gondola (1973), Judgment: The Court Martial of Lieutenant William Calley (1975), The Runaway Barge (1975), The Kansas City Massacre (1975), The Invasion of Johnson County (1976), Dawn: Portrait of a Teenage Runaway (1976), Woman on the Run (1977), Thaddeus Rose and Eddie (1978), Crisis in Sun Valley (1978), and The Busters (1978).

When Gretchen Corbett left the television series The Rockford Files in 1978, Hopkins replaced her character as Rockford's attorney John Cooper, ultimately appearing in three episodes. In 1981, Hopkins appeared in the first season of the prime time drama Dynasty as Matthew Blaisdel. His many other appearances on television included in miniseries Aspen (1977) and Beggarman, Thief (1979), and in episodes of Gunsmoke, Bonanza, The Wild Wild West, The Virginian, Nichols, The Rat Patrol (replacing Justin Tarr as the jeep driver for three episodes), The Mod Squad, Hawaii Five-O, Paul Sand in Friends and Lovers, The Rookies, Charlie's Angels, Fantasy Island, The A-Team, Scarecrow and Mrs. King, The Fall Guy, Crazy Like a Fox, Murder, She Wrote, and Doc Elliot. Hopkins portrayed a role in the video game Nuclear Strike. He plays Colonel LeMonde, a mercenary who steals a nuclear weapon. The "Strike" team tracks him through Southeast Asia.

== Personal life ==
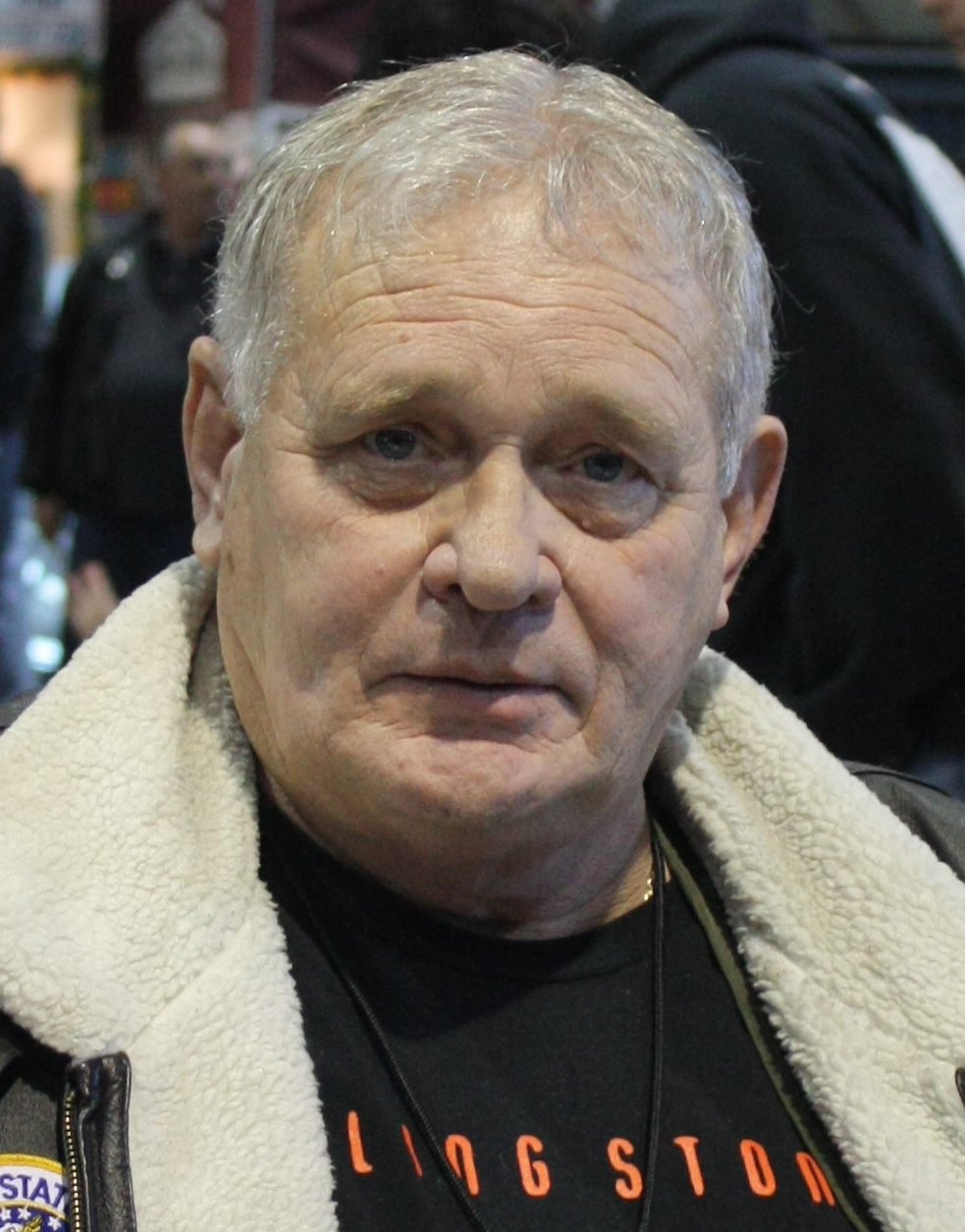
Hopkins in 2009

After his military service, he began dating Norma Woodle, whom he married at age 21, and they had a daughter in July 1960.

Hopkins became interested in pursuing an acting career, but his wife disapproved of it and she soon left him, taking their daughter with her. After appearing in some area plays, he received a scholarship to study acting and stage production at the Pioneer Playhouse in Kentucky, where he soon moved. From Kentucky, he made his way to Manhattan to act in more stage plays. After that, he moved to Hollywood with his cousin's boyfriend, who wanted to be a stuntman. He earned a living parking cars while studying at the Actors Studio, where one of his classmates was Martin Landau.

Hopkins had a two-year relationship with Gondola co-star Sondra Locke. They presented themselves as a couple on the game show Tattletales despite her existing marriage to Gordon Anderson. Their episodes aired just days before she left for Arizona to start shooting The Outlaw Josey Wales.

Hopkins was married to Sian Eleanor Green from 1989 until his death; they had a son in 1995. After six years of professional inactivity, Hopkins returned to acting, reading scripts, and was writing his autobiography.

== Death ==
Hopkins died on May 28, 2022 at Valley Presbyterian Hospital in the Van Nuys section of Los Angeles after suffering a heart attack, aged 84.

== Filmography ==
=== Film ===
Year	Title	Role	Notes
1968	Dayton's Devils	Taxi Driver	
1969	The Thousand Plane Raid	Captain Douglass	
1969	The Wild Bunch	Clarence "Crazy" Lee Stringfellow	
1969	The Bridge at Remagen	Corporal Grebs	
1970	The Moonshine War	Bud Blackwell	
1970	Macho Callahan	Yancy	
1970	Monte Walsh	"Jumpin" Joe Joslin	
1972	The Culpepper Cattle Co.	Dixie Brick	
1972	The Only Way Home	Orval	
1972	The Getaway	Frank Jackson	
1973	The Man Who Loved Cat Dancing	Billy Bowen	
1973	American Graffiti	"Little" Joe Young	
1973	White Lightning	Roy Boone	
1974	The Nickel Ride	Turner	
1975	The Day of the Locust	Earle Shoop	
1975	Posse	Wesley	
1975	The Killer Elite	Jerome Miller	
1976	A Small Town in Texas	Sheriff Duke	
1977	Tentacles	Will Gleason	
1978	Midnight Express	Tex	
1978	The Fifth Floor	Carl	
1979	More American Graffiti	"Little" Joe Young	
1982	Sweet Sixteen	Sheriff Dan Burke	
1984	Mutant	Sheriff Will Stewart	
1988	Nightmare at Noon	Reilly	
1989	The Bounty Hunter	Sheriff Bennett	
1990	Big Bad John	Lester	
1992	Inside Monkey Zetterland	Mike Zetterland	
1993	The Ballad of Little Jo	Frank Badger	
1994	Radioland Murders	Billy's Father	
1996	Uncle Sam	Sergeant Twining	
1997	U Turn	Ed	
1997	Fever Lake	Sheriff Harris	Direct-to-video
1998	Phantoms	FBI Agent Hawthorne	
1998	The Newton Boys	FBI Agent K. P. Aldrich	
1999	From Dusk Till Dawn 2: Texas Blood Money	Sheriff Otis Lawson	Direct-to-video
1999	Getting to Know You	Officer Caminetto	
2000	South of Heaven, West of Hell	"Doc" Angus Fries	
2001	A Crack in the Floor	Sheriff Talmidge	
2001	Cowboy Up	Ray Drupp	
2002	Don't Let Go	The Boss	
2002	City of Ghosts	Teddy	Uncredited
2003	The Road Home	Coach Jimmy Stangel	
2003	Shade	Lieutenant Scarne	
2020	Hillbilly Elegy	Papaw Vance	

=== Television ===
Year	Title	Role	Notes
1966	The Phyllis Diller Show	Chub	1 episode
1967	The Virginian	Will	1 episode
1967	Gunsmoke	Harper Haggen	1 episode
1967	The Wild Wild West	Zack Garrison	S3 E14 "The Night of the Iron Fist"
1967	The Andy Griffith Show	George	1 episode
1968	Judd, for the Defense	Ned Sims	1 episode
1968	The Rat Patrol	Bo Randall	1 episode
1968	The Guns of Will Sonnett	Wes Redford/Ben Merceen	2 episodes
1969	Bonanza	Stretch Logan	1 episode
1969-1970	The Mod Squad	Tom Styles/Arnie	2 episodes
1972	Ironside	Gregg Hewitt	1 episode
1972	Nichols	Kansas	1 episode
1973	Hawaii Five-O	Jeb	1 episode
1973	Gondola	Grady	Television film
1973-1974	Doc Elliot	Eldred McCoy	Main role, 10 episodes
1974	Friends and Lovers	Guest	1 episode
1974	The Manhunter	Sonny Welch	1 episode
1974	The Rookies	Wayne Shipley	1 episode
1975	The Kansas City Massacre	Pretty Boy Floyd	Television film
1975	Judgment: The Court Martial of Lieutenant William Calley	Prosecuting Attorney	Television film
1975	Barnaby Jones	Ken Morley	1 episode
1976; 1979	Charlie's Angels	Beau Creel/Wes Anderson	2 episodes
1976	Jigsaw John	Jimmy Franks	1 episode
1976	The Invasion of Johnson County	George Dunning	Television film
1976	Dawn: Portrait of a Teenage Runaway	Swan	Television film
1977	Aspen	Budd Townsend	3 episodes
1978	Julie Farr, M.D.	Hollis McAfee	1 episode
1978	Thaddeus Rose and Eddie	Eddie	TV movie
1978-1979	The Rockford Files	John Cooper	3 episodes
1979	Supertrain	O'Toole	1 episode
1979	The Last Ride of the Dalton Gang	Billy Doolin	Television film
1980	Casino	Stoney	Television film
1981-1987	Dynasty	Matthew Blaisdel	Main role, 18 episodes
1982	Fantasy Island	Harry	1 episode
1983	Matt Houston	Reverend Noah Sunday	1 episode
1984	The A-Team	Charles Drew	1 episode
1984	Hotel	Walter Solanski	1 episode
1984	Finder of Lost Loves	William Davis/Drew Gilbert	1 episode
1985	The Hitchhiker	Lew Bridgeman	1 episode
1985; 1992	Murder, She Wrote	Lt. Ray Jenkins/Scott Larkin	2 episodes
1985	Scarecrow and Mrs. King	Nick Cross	1 episode
1986	The Fall Guy	Sheriff Phil Talbot	1 episode
1986	Crazy Like a Fox	Lowell	1 episode
1986	Gone to Texas	Sidney Sherman	Television film
1986	A Smoky Mountain Christmas	Sheriff John Jensen	Television film
1987	Mickey Spillane's Mike Hammer	Ted Sharpe	1 episode
1991	Matlock	Sheriff	1 episode
1994	Wyatt Earp: Return to Tombstone	"Rattlesnake" Reynolds	Television film
1994	Cheyenne Warrior	Jack Andrews	Television film
1995	Tom Clancy's Op Center	Dan McCaskey	Miniseries, 2 episodes
1999	Time Served	Jimmy	Television film
2000	The Angry Beavers	Huttin	Voice role, 1 episode

=== Video games ===
Year	Title	Role
1997	Nuclear Strike	Colonel Beauford LeMonde
