= James Francis Ginty =

American actor (born 1980)

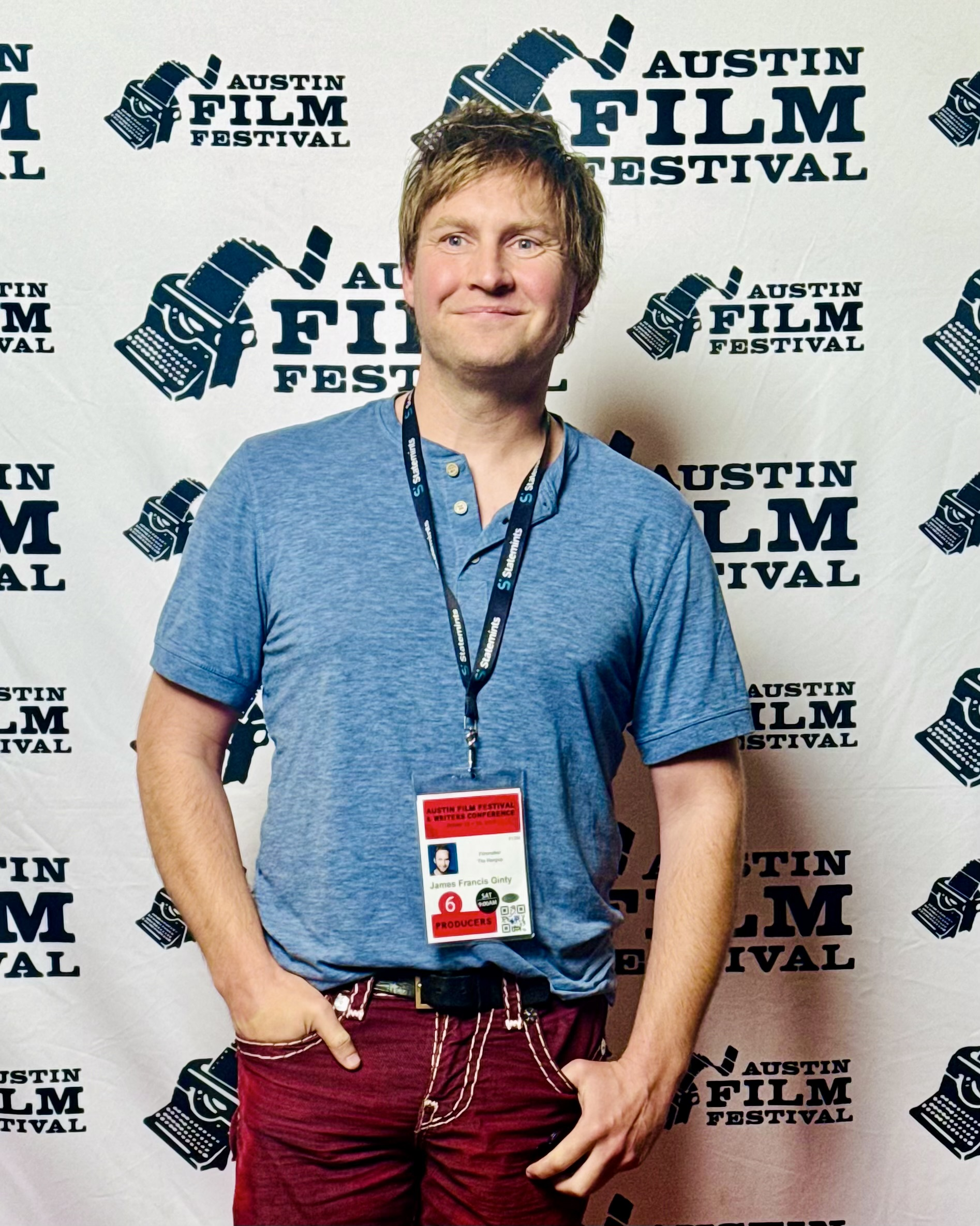
- James Francis Ginty at the 2025 Austin Film Festival
- Born: James Francis Lawrence Ginty; December 4, 1980 (age 45); Los Angeles, California, U.S.
- Citizenship: United States; Ireland
- Education: Juilliard School; University of California, Los Angeles (BA); University of Pennsylvania (MEd); USC (MFA)
- Occupations: Actor, professor
- Years active: 2002–present
- Parents: Robert Ginty (father); Francine Tacker (mother)

James Francis Lawrence Ginty (born December 4, 1980) is an American actor, director, writer, producer and educator. He was discovered by director Kathryn Bigelow while at the Juilliard School in New York City, and was cast in her film K-19: The Widowmaker alongside Harrison Ford and Liam Neeson. He has worked in film, theatre and television and is probably best known for playing multiple roles in Disney's sci-fi action picture Surrogates. In the 2020s, he expanded his filmmaking career into directing, writing, and producing, beginning with the award-winning short film Created Sleep Transmissions (2022) followed by Nita (2025), The Hangup (2025), and The Things I Leave Behind (2026).

== Early life and education ==
Born in Los Angeles, Ginty is the son of actor/director Robert Ginty, and American actress Francine Tacker, who met as series regulars on the late 1970s television series The Paper Chase. Ginty attended Valley Forge Military Academy and the Interlochen Arts Academy. Ginty subsequently continued his acting education at the Juilliard School in New York City as a member of the Drama Division's "Group 32" alongside Jessica Chastain, Jess Weixler and Michael Urie. Ginty later graduated with a bachelor's of history from UCLA and a Master of Education from the University of Pennsylvania. In 2025, he completed a Master of Fine Arts in Film Production at the University of Southern California.

== Career ==
Ginty dropped out of Juilliard when Kathryn Bigelow cast him in K-19: The Widowmaker. He went on to star in Touchstone Pictures' Surrogates alongside Bruce Willis and Rosamund Pike, directed by Jonathan Mostow. Ginty played two roles in the film, that of Dr. Lionel Canter as well as the surrogate of his son, Jared. The film grossed over $120 million at the worldwide box office.

On television Ginty has appeared in hit shows such as Grey's Anatomy, ER, Chuck, Blue Bloods, Deadbeat, and the Stephen Frears directed movie Muhammad Ali's Greatest Fight for HBO Films (nominated for a Primetime Emmy in the category of Outstanding Television Movie).

Ginty's regional theatre credits include playing Romeo in the Seattle Repertory Theatre's production of Romeo and Juliet, Bertram in The Folger Shakespeare Theatre's production of All's Well That Ends Well, and Jacob Milne in Tom Stoppard's Night and Day at Philadelphia's Wilma Theatre.

In the 2020s, Ginty expanded his filmmaking career into directing, writing, and producing. His directorial debut short film, Created Sleep Transmissions, won the Audience Award for Best Short Film at the Traverse City Film Festival in 2022. He subsequently co-starred in and produced the 2025 NYU graduate school short film Nita, which screened at the 18th Bushwick Film Festival, followed by writing, producing, and starring in the black comedy short film The Hangup (2025), which had its world premiere at the Austin Film Festival where its screenplay was nominated for the Enderby Entertainment Fellowship Award. In 2026, he produced the short family drama film The Things I Leave Behind, which served as his USC School of Cinematic Arts capstone project.

=== Teaching ===
Ginty has worked as a professor at Fordham University in New York City, and taught history at Miss Porter's, an all-girls boarding school in Farmington, Connecticut. He taught history at the Chapin School in Manhattan, New York, but left in 2020 and returned to filmmaking.

== Filmography ==
=== Film ===
| Year | Title | Role | Notes |
|---|---|---|---|
| 1990 | Vietnam, Texas | Altar Boy | Uncredited |
| 2002 | K-19: The Widowmaker | Anatoly Subachev | |
| 2009 | Surrogates | Canter | |
| 2013 | Muhammad Ali's Greatest Fight | Brennan's Clerk | |

=== Television ===
| Year | Title | Role | Notes |
|---|---|---|---|
| 2006 | ER | Frick | 1 episode |
| 2006 | Real Time with Bill Maher | Trent | Uncredited |
| 2007 | Days of Our Lives | Dr. Deardon | 3 episodes |
| 2007 | Private Practice | ER Intern | 1 episode |
| 2010 | Grey's Anatomy | Dr. Russell | 1 episode |
| 2011 | Chuck | Lewis | 1 episode |
| 2013 | Blue Bloods | FBI Agent Anthony Cook | 1 episode |
| 2014 | Deadbeat | Sievert | 2 episodes |
| 2014 | Unforgettable | Wendell Kuryak | 2 episodes |
| 2018 | Bull | Josh O'Connor | 1 episode |
