= Ultraman: The Adventure Begins =

- Theatrical release poster
- Directed by: Mitsuo Kusakabe; Ray Patterson (supervising)
- Written by: John Eric Seward
- Produced by: Noboru Tsuburaya
- Starring: Michael Lembeck; Chad Everett; Adrienne Barbeau; Stacy Keach Sr.
- Edited by: Naoyuki Masaki
- Music by: Shinsuke Kazato
- Production companies: Hanna-Barbera Productions; Tsuburaya Productions; Studio Sign; Ashi Productions
- Distributed by: Toho
- Release date: October 12, 1987
- Running time: 75 minutes
- Countries: United States; Japan
- Languages: English; Japanese

Ultraman: The Adventure Begins (ウルトラマンUSA, Urutoraman Yū Esu Ē; Ultraman USA) is a 1987 animated superhero film jointly produced by Hanna-Barbera Productions and Tsuburaya Productions and animated by both Studio Sign and Ashi Productions. It is the second foreign Ultra Series production overall, and the second foreign Ultraman film after The 6 Ultra Brothers vs. the Monster Army. Originally intended as a pilot for an animated series, no such series ever emerged and the pilot was made into a full-length film. It was broadcast on television in the United States on October 12, 1987, with a Japanese theatrical release following on April 28, 1989. The costumes based on the three main heroes (the Ultra Team) were made for use in stage shows in Japan.

== Plot ==
A stunt pilot trio, the "Flying Angels" (Scott Masterson, Chuck Gavin, and Beth O'Brien), is caught in a bizarre flash of light and crashes, only to emerge unharmed. They are later informed by an agent of an interstellar peace-keeping agency (whose secret identity is the groundskeeper at a Pebble Beach golf course) that they have become the hosts to three warriors from the planet Altara in M78 to capture escaped monsters from the destroyed planet Sorkin who have arrived on Earth. They become the Ultra Force, headquartered within Mount Rushmore, and are assisted by a trio of robots (the pint-sized Andy, the strong Samson, and the twitchy Ulysses). Although equipped with futuristic fighter crafts, inevitably one or more of the team is required to transform into an Ultraman, a gigantic red and silver superhuman being, to battle the monsters. After destroying the most powerful Sorkin monster, the constantly growing King Maira, the Ultra Force remains together to combat further threats to Earth.

== Characters ==
=== Ultra Force ===
Ultra Force (ウルトラフォース, Urutora Fosu) is an organization formed by a mysterious old man, Walter Freeman. The headquarters is in the basement of the Georgia National Golf Club, and there is a mechanic hangar at Mount Rushmore.

Members

- Scott Masterson (スコット・マスターソン, Sokotto Masutāson): The story's young protagonist. Transforms into Ultraman Scott (ウルトラマンスコット, Urutoraman Sukotto). 25 years old. Integrated with Ultraman Scott. A character with no eyes on young women. He is pleased with Susan. He is voiced by Michael Lembeck in English, Kellen Goff in the English 2025 dub and Tōru Furuya (古谷 徹, Furuya Tōru) in Japanese dub.
- Chuck Gavin (チャック・ギャビン, Chakku Gyabin): The toughest and oldest of the team and the de facto leader of the Ultra Team. Transforms into Ultraman Chuck (ウルトラマンチャック, Urutoraman Chakku), one of the Ultra warriors who came to the earth with other Ultra team members following the Sorkin Monster. 35 years old. Integrated with Ultraman Chuck. Leader rank at the battle scene. He is voiced by Chad Everett in English, Imari Williams in the English 2025 dub and Shinji Ogawa (小川 真司, Ogawa Shinji) in Japanese dub.
- Beth O'Brien (ベス・オブライエン, Besu Oburaien): The cool-headed female of the team. Transforms into Ultrawoman Beth (ウルトラウーマンベス, Urutoraūman Besu). A woman Ultra fighter who came to the earth with another Ultra Team member following the Sorkin Monster. 26 years old. Integrated with Ultra Woman Beth. She attends a dance class on holiday. She is voiced by Adrienne Barbeau in English, Caitlin Glass in the English 2025 dub and Hiromi Tsuru (鶴 ひろみ, Tsuru Hiromi) in Japanese dub.
- The Robot Trio (ロボトリオUSA, Robo Torio Yū Esu Ē): A group of support robots built to assist the Ultra Force. Their true names were too long for the team to remember, so they were given nicknames by Scott (who came up with "Ulysses" and "Samson") and Beth (who came up with "Andy"). The initials in their names form the letters "USA".
  - Ulysses (ユリシーズ, Yurishīzu): The thin and effeminate robot in orange. His true name is Combot Model MF842. He is voiced by William Callaway in English, Ian Sinclair in the English 2025 dub and Isamu Tanonaka (田の中 勇, Tanonaka Isamu) in Japanese dub.
  - Samson (サムソン, Samuson): The big and strong robot in blue. His true name is Combot Model BA666. He is voiced by Ronnie Schell in English, Michael Sinterniklaas in the English 2025 dub and Hiroshi Ōtake (大竹 宏, Ōtake Hiroshi) in Japanese dub.
  - Andy (アンディ, Andi): The pint-sized robot in red. His true name is Utiloid Model ZQ14582. In charge of the Transportation System. He is voiced by Charlie Adler in English, Brittany Lauda in the English 2025 dub and Kyoko Yamada (山田 恭子, Yamada Kyōko) in Japanese dub.
- Walter Freeman (ウォルター・フリーマン, Worutā Furīman): An elderly man in his late 60s who forms the Ultra Force. He explains to the heroes the true cause of their accident and the origins of their powers. His relation to the Ultra beings and how he knows about them is never revealed. He is voiced by Stacy Keach, Sr. in English, Mike Pollock in the English 2025 dub and Kōhei Miyauchi (宮内 孝幸, Miyauchi Takayuki) in the Japanese dub.
- Dr. Susan Rand (スーザン・ランド, Sūzan Rando): A young scientist from the Federation for Extraterrestrial Research (or F.E.R. Labs). She has sympathy towards the Sorkin Monsters fought by the Ultra Force. She gets romantically connected with Scott. She is voiced by Lorna Patterson in English, Kira Buckland in the English 2025 dub and Rihoko Yoshida (吉田 理保子, Yoshida Rihoko) in Japanese dub.

Mecha

Ultra Force has a mecha used to defend the Earth against the Sorkin Monsters.

- Ultra Force Headquarters: Located in the basement of the Georgia National Golf Club, and there is a mechanic hangar at Mount Rushmore.
- Mothership (マザーシップ, Mazāshippu): Ultra Force's mother ship. Equipped with three Ultra Jets. In the game against King Mylar, it is possible to collect sunlight by supplementing it with the parabola installed on the Ultra team that was running out of energy, or to carry the Ultra Team to the outside of the atmosphere. Vertical takeoff and landing is possible with the wing engine.
- Ultra Jets (ウルトラジェット, Urutora Jetto): A fighter that Scott and others pilot it. The flight speed is Mach 7.3. Equipped with anti-monster missiles and a laser. The canopy painted in Scott's jet is blue, Beth's jet is red, and Chuck's jet is yellow.

=== Ultras ===
The three Ultra warriors are from Planet Altara (惑星アルタラ, Wakusei Arutara) in Nebula M78.

==== Ultraman Scott ====
One of the Ultra warriors who came from the M78 Nebula, which came to Earth following the Sorkin Monster. It became a one-sided entity living in Captain Scott Masterson of the American Air Force's acrobat flight team "Flying Angels" (フライング・エンジェルス, Furaingu Enjerusu), initially able to transform himself during a crisis, but also able to transform of his own will in the middle. Having a buckle with a blue star shape in the abdomen, when the solar energy decreases, the beam lamp on the forehead flashes from blue to red and issues a warning sound. He threw Garuballade at power plants, etc., and they are good at the somewhat rough fighting way. He is voiced by Michael Lembeck in English, Kellen Goff in the English 2025 dub and Tōru Furuya in Japanese dub.

Stats

- Height: 269 feet
- Weight: 64.000 Tons
- Flight Speed: Mach 24

Weapons

- Granium Light Ray (グラニウム光線, Guraniumu Kōsen): A group of rays that gathers energy from the granite, combines both hands in a cross, and releases it. Although it is a common technique of the 3 warriors, only Scott used it alone. If three people shoot at the same time Ultra Synchro Beam (ウルトラ・シンクロビーム, Urutora Shinkuro Bīmu) will increase its power.
- Ultra Energy Ball (ウルトラ・エナジー・ボール, Urutora Enajī Bōru): Condensed energy discharged from the waist buckle and thrown into the light bulb. It damaged the main Im of the Garuballade.
- Ultra Slicer (ウルトラ・スライサー, Urutora Suraisā): A technique to make the granular energy into a circular saw and throw it. He threw it in two consecutive angles to the Im damaged by the Ultra Energy Ball, and it split into four. Then he gave out the Granium Rays and extinguished the Im.
- Ultra Push Beam (ウルトラ・プッシュビーム, Urutora Pusshu Bīmu): After assembling the arms in the opposite shape to the Granium Ray, it is a yellow ray that shoots like a strip from the left hand he stood. It emanates from the Zoon wrapped in Ultraman Chuck's "Ultra Bubble Beam" and pushes it towards the Andromeda Nebula's planet M11.
- Triple Power (トリプルパワー, Toripuru Pawā): A counterattack to an enemy approaching at high speed.
- Ultra Throw (ウルトラ投げ, Urutora Nage): A technique to throw away the opponent with mighty power. He threw away a huge Garuballade boasting a body length of 150m or more from the city of San Francisco to the Alcatraz Island in the offing.
- Ultra Attack (ウルトラアタック, Urutora Atakku): After rushing at a tremendous speed, with a meatball skill that hits the whole body weight against the enemy, it has the power to blow huge enemies by hundreds of meters. They extended out of the air towards the third form of King Myra, who had destroyed the city area of New York and temporarily broke it.

==== Ultraman Chuck ====
Like Scott, Captain Chuck Gavin, one of the Flying Angels, became one and the same. It is close to the command tower that dealt with things calmly and instructs the other two people. When the solar energy decreases, the beam lamp on the forehead flashes from blue to red and issues a warning sound. He is voiced by Chad Everett in English, Imari Williams in the English 2025 dub and Shinji Ogawa in Japanese dub.

Stats

- Height: 259 feet
- Weight: 68.000 Tons
- Flight Speed: Mach 22

Weapons

- Granium Light Ray: The Plus style laser weapon.
- Ultra Bubble Beam (ウルトラ・バブル・ビーム, Urutora Baburu Bīmu): An energy beam that creates a bubble around a monster to transport them through space.

==== Ultrawoman Beth ====
Just like the other two, who lived in Lieutenant Beth O'Brien at Flying Angels. When the solar energy decreases, the beam lamp on the forehead flashes from blue to red and issues a warning sound. At the time the movie was released in Japan she was known as Ultra Woman. She is voiced by Adrienne Barbeau in English, Caitlin Glass in the English 2025 dub and Hiromi Tsuru in Japanese dub.

Stats

- Height: 249 feet
- Weight: 54.000 Tons
- Flight Speed: Mach 23

Weapons

- Granium Light Ray: The Plus style laser weapon.
- Ultra Spout (ウルトラ・スパウト, Urutora Supauto): A laser weapon she can fire from her hands when she is above a body of water.
- Ultra Chop (ウルトラチョップ, Urutora Choppu): Attack attacking enemies with hand-swords while releasing energy from the body to the hand. She quickly tore up the tentacles of Green Shocks.
- Ultra Power (ウルトラパワー, Urutora Pawā): A strong technique that throws enemies many times higher than herself.

=== The Sorkin Monsters ===
The Sorkin Monsters (ソーキン・モンスター, Sōkin Monsutā) are from Planet Sorkin (惑星ソーキン, Wakusei Sōkin) in Nebula M78.

==== Green Shocks ====
Plant Monster Green Shocks (植物怪獣 グリンショックス, Shokubutsu Kaijū Gurin Shokkusu) is a vegetation monster. Has accelerated regeneration and powerful vines. (Note: "Louisiana wetlands" was mentioned in "Ultraman Dictionary".) (Note: Spelt as "Grinshocks" in the original soundtrack.)

Stats

- Height: 328 feet (initial, can vary)
- Weight: 30,000 tons (initial, can vary)

==== Garuballade ====
Electromagnetic Monster Garuballade (電磁怪獣 ガルバレード, Denji Kaijū Garubarēdo) is an electronic machinery monster. Superficially resembles a crystal ball (with a creature face in the center) and uses scrap metal from machinery to construct itself a monster body. The ball phase, standing on its long spinal tail, is called Electromagnetic Ball Beast Im (電磁球獣 イーム, Denji Kyū-jū Īmu) (pronounced "eem"). (Note: "San Francisco" was mentioned in "Ultraman Dictionary".) (Note: In the "Ultraman Dictionary", mentioned it as "E.M.M.".) (Note: Spelt as "Galbarade" in the original soundtrack.)

Stats

- Height: 300 feet (Im: 500 feet)
- Weight: 91,000 tons (Im: 27,000 tons)

==== Zoon ====
Comical Child Monster Zoon (ひょうきん子怪獣 ズーン, Hyōkin Ko Kaijū Zūn) is a friendly, dragon-like monster of stout stature. Zoon landed in Utah, where his presence at a ski resort caused the US Military to confront him. Fortunately, Ultraman Chuck intervened and guided him back to space, sending him on his way to a new home. (Note: "Utah ski resorts" was mentioned in "Ultraman Encyclopedia".)

Stats

- Height: 114 feet
- Weight: 35,000 tons

==== King Myra ====
Super Transforming Monster King Myra (超変身怪獣 キングマイラ, Chō Henshin Kaijū Kingu Maira) is the most powerful of the Sorkin Monsters. He can double his size every 90 minutes without limit. He can also become invisible. His initial infant form Wylon (ウィロン, Wiron) is actually small and adorable. The Ultra Force had the most difficult time with him as his increased growth spurts resulted in deadlier abilities used against them. (Note: "New York" was mentioned in "Ultraman Encyclopedia".) (Note: Spelt as "King-Maera" in the original soundtrack.)

Stats

- Height: Infinite in growth (Wylon: 15 inches)
- Weight: Infinite in growth (Wylon: 11 lbs.)

== Voice cast ==
Character	English	Japanese	2025 English Recast
Scott Masterson/Ultraman Scott	Michael Lembeck	Tōru Furuya	Kellen Goff
Chuck Gavin/Ultraman Chuck	Chad Everett	Shinji Ogawa	Imari Williams
Lt. Beth O'Brien/Ultrawoman Beth	Adrienne Barbeau	Hiromi Tsuru	Caitlin Glass
Walter Freeman	Stacy Keach, Sr.	Kōhei Miyauchi	Mike Pollock
Andy	Charlie Adler	Kyoko Yamada	Brittany Lauda
Old Lady	Adrienne Alexander	Unknown	
Woman	Adrienne Alexander	Unknown	
Ulysses	William Callaway	Isamu Tanonaka	Ian Sinclair
Clarinetist	Al Fann	Unknown	
Paramedic	Al Fann	Unknown	
General Cooper	Ed Gilbert	Takeshi Aono	Bill Butts
Newsman	Robert David Hall	Unknown	
Scientist	Robert David Hall	Unknown	
Colonel Baldinger/Colonel Bodinger	Allan Lurie	Masaharu Satō	Cris George
Dr. Susan Rand	Lorna Patterson	Rihoko Yoshida	Kira Buckland
Cajun	Peter Renaday	Unknown	
Paramedic	Peter Renaday	Unknown	
Samson	Ronnie Schell	Hiroshi Ōtake	Michael Sinterniklaas
Mark Watkins	Mark L. Taylor	Kaneto Shiozawa	Daman Mills
Aide	Vince Trankina	Unknown	
Doctor #2	Vince Trankina	Unknown	
Photographer	Vince Trankina	Unknown	
Dr. Philby	Les Tremayne	Yasuo Tanaka	Kent Williams

== Crew ==
- Director: Mitsuo Kusakabe
- Screenplay: John Eric Seward
- Character design: Kazuo Iimura
- Hero design: Hitoshi Yoshida
- Mechanic design: Tomohiko Sato
- Monster design: Keita Amemiya, Hirotoshi Murayama, Chisato Sugiura
- Art director: Akira Furuya
- Color: Koji Wakai, Yuko Koshiba
- Drawing directors: Kazuo Iimura, Osamu Tsuruyama, Yuuki Kudo, Nobuyoshi Habara
- Storyboards: Seiji Okuda, Satoshi Nagao, Mitsuo Kusakabe, Toshio Ohba
- Cinematographer: Toshiaki Morita
- Editor: Naoki Masaki
- Sound director: Noriyoshi Matsuura
- Japanese version directed by: Riku Matsukawa
- Sound effects: Swara Productions
- Development: Tokyo Development Office
- Music: Shingo Futo
- Music producer: Hidetoshi Kimura
- Creative producers: Jeff Segal, Kelly Ward
- Supervising director: Ray Patterson
- Production supervisor: Ken Mimura
- Creative design: Iwao Takamoto
- Key character design: Floro Dery
- Key background supervisor: Al Gmuer
- Editorial supervisor: Larry Cowan
- Voice director: Gordon Hunt
- Animation casting director: Andrea Romano
- Talent coordinator: Kris Zimmerman
- Executive producer: Jane Barbera
- Executive coordinator: Kiyotaka Ukawa
- Associate producer: Shizuka Tamagawa
- Executive producers: Noboru Tsuburaya, William Hanna, Joseph Barbera
- Animation producers: Masayoshi Ozaki (Studio Sain), Go Eto (Tsuburaya Productions)
- Cooperation: Studio Zain, Sakai Production, Ryu Production
- Production partnership: Tsuburaya Productions, Hanna-Barbera Productions, Kodansha, Nippon Columbia, Bandai
- Production: Tsuburaya Productions

== Production ==
Ultraman: The Adventure Begins was a co-production between Hanna-Barbera and Tsuburaya Productions who hoped the film would not only introduce the Ultraman media franchise to American audiences but also serve as a pilot for a potential series. The animation for the film was provided by Ashi Productions and Studio Sign.

== Music ==
=== Songs ===
Main theme

- "Toki no Naka o Hashirinukete" (時の中を走りぬけて; "Race Against Time")
  - Lyrics: Yū Aku
  - Composition: Shunichi Tokura
  - Arrangement: Shinsuke Kazato
  - Artist: Shinichi Ishihara, Koorogi '73

Image theme

- "Sky High Hero" (スカイ・ハイ・ヒーロー, Sukai Hai Hīrō)
  - Lyrics: Yū Aku
  - Composition: Shunichi Tokura
  - Arrangement: Shinsuke Kazato
  - Artist: Shinichi Ishihara, Koorogi '73

=== Soundtrack ===
The music was composed by Shinsuke Kazato and released by Nippon Columbia. The soundtrack was released as a limited edition printing of 5,000 copies.

== Reception ==
While the film was intended to serve as a pilot for a series it was unsuccessful in the United States.

== Home media ==
Ultraman USA was released in Japan by Bandai Home Video on VHS (Japanese dub only) on September 29, 1989, and on LaserDisc (bilingual) on July 25, 1991. In North America, a VHS was released by Ultra Action Video and L.A. Hero Inc. on June 2, 1993.

Tsubaraya announced that Bandai Visual will release a remastered version of the film on Blu-ray in Japan on September 26, 2018.

On July 2, 2025, Mill Creek released the film on Blu-ray. This version includes a new English cast and the original Japanese dub. Due to rights issues, the original English audio is not included in this set. In addition, the Japanese dub does not come with English subtitles.

== Other appearances ==
- Ultraman Legend, This cast gets new live-action footage in this short, which features fight scenes of each of the 28 Ultras from the original Ultraman to Ultraman Cosmos.
- Mega Monster Battle: Ultra Galaxy Legend The Movie (2009), Ultraman USA, along with other M78 Ultra Warriors, fights against the evil Ultraman Belial. This marks their second-ever live appearances onscreen, after the "Shinseiki Ultraman Densetsu" featurette.
- Ultra Galaxy Fight: The Destined Crossroad (2022), the 3 main Ultras appeared in the fourth episode of the web series in which they confront Absolute Titan at Planet Babel.
