= The Astrologer (1975 horror film) =

1975 American horror film directed by James Glickenhaus

- Theatrical release poster
- Directed by: James Glickenhaus (as Jim Glickenhaus)
- Written by: James Glickenhaus (uncredited)
- Based on: The Astrologer by John Cameron
- Produced by: Mark Buntzman
- Starring: Bob Byrd; Mark Buntzman; James Glickenhaus
- Cinematography: Francis A. Romero
- Edited by: Victor Zimet
- Music by: Brad Fiedel
- Distributed by: Republic Arts
- Release date: December 1975
- Running time: 96 minutes
- Country: United States
- Language: English
- Budget: $65,000

The Astrologer (also known as Suicide Cult) is a 1975 American horror film directed by James Glickenhaus and starring Bob Byrd, Mark Buntzman, and James Glickenhaus.

== Premise ==
A scientist who is investigating reports of the Second Coming of Christ ends up in conflict with a Satan-worshipping suicide cult.

== Cast ==
- Bob Byrd as Alexei
- Mark Buntzman as Kajerste
- James Glickenhaus as Spy
- Alison McCarthy as Rhav
- Al Narcisse as Congressman Joe Harwell
- Monica Tidwell as Kate Abarnel
- Ivy White as Indian Maiden

== Production ==
The film was based on the book The Astrologer written by John Cameron, James Glickenhaus's future father-in-law. Glickenhaus made a deal with Cameron for the book, wrote the screenplay.

Glickenhaus says that he made the movie for about $20,000. "I'd inherited some money," Glickenhaus told The New York Times, "and I took all of it and lost it making a movie called 'The Astrologer.' I'd been to film school, but film school was oriented more toward the avant-garde in those days, and I didn't really know what a master was or a cutaway or a closeup. And I had great trouble conveying ideas, except in dialogue. So 'The Astrologer,' which was about 79 minutes long, was probably 60 minutes of dialogue. I mean, it was interminable. I didn't think it was interminable then. I thought it was great and interesting and fascinating to listen to." The film took him two years to produce from start to finish.

The film's soundtrack was composed by Brad Fiedel, in his debut.

== Release ==
With no independent distributors interested in acquiring the film, Glickenhaus convinced some drive-in theaters in the South to screen it. He later recalled, "Even though it was a terrible movie, people didn't absolutely hate it. But I realized by watching them that the only parts they liked were the parts with action." Glickenhaus deciding the overabundance of dialogue in The Astrologer compared to the level of action was the cause of its failure would inspire him to write The Exterminator 21st Century Film Corporation eventually bought the rights to The Astrologer believing they could make it work and re-titled it The Suicide Cult in an effort to capitalize on the Jonestown massacre.

== Reception ==
The film was called an "ultra obscure and undeniably fascinating thriller". Another commentator found, "The irony, however, is that this debut effort by James Glickenhaus is neither a horror or science fiction film: its a pure Christploitation, aka Godploitation, romp..."
