= The Exterminator =

1980 film directed by James Glickenhaus

- U.S. theatrical poster
- Directed by: James Glickenhaus
- Written by: James Glickenhaus
- Produced by: Mark Buntzman
- Starring: Christopher George; Samantha Eggar; Robert Ginty
- Cinematography: Robert M. Baldwin
- Edited by: Corky O'Hara
- Music by: Joe Renzetti
- Production company: Interstar Pictures
- Distributed by: AVCO Embassy Pictures
- Release date: September 10, 1980 (U.S.)
- Running time: 104 minutes
- Country: United States
- Language: English
- Budget: $1.5–2 million
- Box office: $4-5 million (domestic rentals only)

The Exterminator is a 1980 American vigilante action film written and directed by James Glickenhaus and starring Christopher George, Samantha Eggar, and Robert Ginty. Ginty plays John Eastland, a Vietnam veteran who turns vigilante when his employer gets shaken down by the Mafia and his best friend, a fellow veteran who once saved his life in combat, is left paralyzed by a street gang. George plays a detective who is actively pursuing Eastland.

The film, particularly the grisly methods employed by Eastland to coerce criminals, drew outrage from critics. However, it was an independent hit, generating $30 to $35 million in total revenue. It gave Ginty, until then best known as a supporting player in mainstream fare, a second career as an exploitation leading man, and marked the breakthrough of African-American actor Steve James. It is also considered an early example of the vetsploitation subgenre.

== Plot ==
During a firefight in Vietnam, U.S. soldiers John Eastland and his best friend, Michael Jefferson, are captured by the Viet Cong. They are tied to wooden stakes with several other men, and tortured for information. When Eastland refuses to answer, the VC commander decapitates the soldier beside him with a machete. Jefferson escapes moments later, kills the remaining VC soldiers, and unties Eastland, who then kills the commander.

The film then shifts to New York, where Eastland and Jefferson work in a warehouse. One day, Eastland catches a group of thugs, called the Ghetto Ghouls, trying to steal beer. He is attacked, but Jefferson comes to his aid. They defeat them, but the gang return to cripple Jefferson, damaging his spine with a meat hook. Eastland, after this incident, captures and interrogates one of the gang members with a flamethrower. He then attacks the gang's base of operations with his rifle, shooting one gang member and leaving two others tied up in a basement (also shooting one of them afterwards), which is full of hungry rats.

Eastland's justice doesn't end there. The warehouse where he works has been forced into paying protection money. Gino Pontivini, the mob boss behind the scheme, has even taxed the workers' paychecks. Eastland kidnaps Pontivini, and chains him above an industrial meat grinder. Eastland then demands information to get to Pontivini's safe, which Pontivini reluctantly gives. Eastland barely survives an attack by Pontivini's Dobermann, so upon returning, he lowers Pontivini into the grinder for lying about the dog. Jefferson and his family are given Pontivini's money to help pay their bills.

Detective James Dalton begins investigating the attacks, while the press dub Eastland the "Exterminator". Meanwhile, Eastland kills the ring leader of a child prostitution ring, as well as a state senator from New Jersey who sexually abuses children. He also kills three more members of the Ghetto Ghouls (one of which being the gang member he interrogated earlier), after witnessing them rob an elderly woman. Meanwhile, the CIA has heard of the Exterminator and reaches an odd conclusion. Based on the current administration's promise to cut down crime rates, they believe the Exterminator is either an opposition party's stunt, or a foreign power's ruse to humiliate the current administration; by exposing their inability to handle the city's crime problem.

They monitor Dalton's investigation of the Exterminator. Dalton, working from a bootprint found at Pontivini's home, discovers the Exterminator wears hunting boots manufactured by a mail order firm in Maine. Asking them for a list of clients in New York, and following the hunch that the Exterminator may be a Vietnam War veteran; since he killed the Ghetto Ghouls with an M16 rifle, Dalton has narrowed his suspects accordingly. Eastland visits Jefferson in the hospital, and because he will never be able to walk again, Jefferson asks Eastland to end his life.

Eastland does, but coincidentally, Dalton is visiting the hospital at the same time. When he learns about Jefferson's death, Dalton surmises that one of Jefferson's friends was the Exterminator, and learns that one of his suspects, Eastland, was Jefferson's closest friend. Eastland is aware that Dalton is staking out his apartment, so he arranges a private meeting with him, where he hopes to explain why he became a vigilante. However, the CIA are aware of the rendezvous after bugging Eastland's phone. They ambush him at his meeting with Dalton, which results in Dalton being killed while helping Eastland escape.

== Cast ==
- Christopher George as Detective James Dalton
- Samantha Eggar as Dr. Megan Stewart
- Robert Ginty as John Eastland / The Exterminator
- Steve James as Michael Jefferson
- Tony DiBenedetto as Chicken Pimp
- Dick Boccelli as Gino Pontivini
- Patrick Farrelly as CIA Agent Shaw
- Michele Harrell as Maria Jefferson
- David Lipman as The New Jersey State Senator
- Cindy Wilks as Candy
- Dennis Boutsikaris as Frankie
- George Cheung as Viet Cong Commander
- Tom Everett as Hotel Clerk
- Ned Eisenberg as Marty
- Irwin Keyes as Bobby
- Mark Buntzman as Burping Ghoul
- Tony Munafo as Pontivini's Bodyguard

TV anchors Roger Grimsby and Judy Licht and musician Stan Getz appear as themselves. Samuel L. Jackson makes an uncredited appearance as an extra.

== Production ==
While promoting his struggling first film The Astrologer, director James Glickenhaus realized the importance of the Southern drive-in and international markets, which demanded more visual and action-driven product. A visit to the 1978 Cannes Film Market with Astrologer producer Mark Buntzman allowed the pair to finetune their assessment of what the world wanted to see.

The impetus for The Exterminator came from the mugging of a Columbia University student in an elevator, which had left him paralyzed. Drawing from Sergio Leone, the original draft only had a handful of dialogue lines, but this did not prove commercially viable and a more conventional structure was adopted. Buntzman, who was Glickenhaus' childhood friend, returned as producer. In the early stages of development, the projected budget was just $850,000. More money was added as the picture grew in ambition. The budget was provided by Glickenhaus' affluent family, and business acquaintances of the Buntzmans, who were big real estate players.

=== Casting ===
Joseph Bottoms was originally hired to play John Eastland. To entice the young star, Glickenhaus topped up his fee with a percentage of the film's profits, which would have made him millions had he foreseen its success. However, when Bottoms landed a role in the Disney film The Black Hole, his camp asked for an extra $10,000, arguing that The Exterminator could damage his image. While the sum was modest, Glickenhaus did not appreciate being ambushed just one week before filming. He refused out of principle and delayed photography by another week to find a replacement.

Among the actors offered to him was Robert Ginty, whom he had seen portray a Vietman veteran in the 1978 drama Coming Home. Although his everyman physique was at odds with the audience's expectations of an action star, the director rationalized that it might make his vigilante turn more impactful. Ginty loved the script, in part because he had once witnessed a fatal gang attack on a friend, and returned to New York within twenty-four hours. While getting along creatively, Ginty and Glickenhaus did not gel from a personal standpoint. According to the director, Ginty later acknowledged his bad behavior, and they remained on speaking terms thereafter, albeit not particularly close.

Steve James also received his first featured role in this film. Originally, James applied for the bit part of a bartender, but Glickenhaus liked him so much that he rewrote Eastland's best friend, a Puerto Rican, as an African-American to accommodate him. Top billed Christopher George and BAFTA Award nominee Samantha Eggar were added to bring respectability to the project. Despite the project's modest stature, George earned plaudits both his humbleness. Glickenhaus did not think that the British Eggar was a perfect fit for the story, although that was not an indictment of her acting abilities.

=== Principal photography ===
Filming started in mid-September 1979 in New York City and was scheduled for eight weeks. Some scenes were shot at an illegal prostitution house on 42nd Street. Glickenhaus was there when the police closed it down, and arranged with them to shoot there. The Bronx Terminal Market was used extensively. Vehicular crashes were staged there, as were scenes set at the food warehouse employing Ginty and James' characters. This was done for practical reasons, as Buntzman's father David had business interests there. Some shots of crowded streets were stolen by concealing the camera inside a cardboard box. The stunts were coordinated by Cliff Cundey, who had previously been a performer on The French Connection. Tom Brumberger was hired to oversee the special effects, but he goes uncredited in the final film. At the beginning of production, Brumberger hyped up an innovative, 150-foot "tower of fire". According to Buntzman, there were issues with some of the effects not working.

=== Reshoots ===
After viewing the assembly cut, it was decided that the movie needed a signature setpiece. This led to the creation of the Vietnam prologue. It took only four days to shoot, but benefited from four weeks of extensive planning, which was mostly overseen by Buntzman. Glickenhaus did join in time to direct.

The sequence was filmed at the Indian Dunes in Valencia, California, under pyrotechnics coordinator Paul Stewart. The same location and coordinator would be used for Twilight Zone's ill-fated Vietnam segment in 1982. During the ensuing trial, it was alleged that incidents foreshadowing that catastrophe, including a helicopter mishap, had taken place on The Exterminator. Glickenhaus categorically denied the bulk of those claims, and provided trade magazine Variety with corroborating testimonies. The decapitation scene did not use a simple dummy, but a full animatronic made by Stan Winston for $25,000. Because it was so realistic, Glickenhaus believes it was used in all shots.

Estimates of the film's total budget have varied somewhat. In a contemporary interview, Buntzman determined that it had come in at $1.5 million, including a bit over $1 million for principal photography. In retrospective comments, Glickenhaus said that it had cost about $2 million, including $400,000 for the additional prologue.

=== Post-production ===
The Exterminator was mixed in Dolby Stereo, a rarity for an exploitation film at the time. According to Buntzman, it was the first New York City production to use the format, and the local Dolby facility was not yet complete when the film was being worked on. Another scene that almost went through reshoots was the dog attack, because the animal did display enough aggressiveness. However, editor Corky O'Hara managed to salvage it. The movie featured a fair bit of slow motion, as the young director remained influenced by Sam Peckinpah's use of the technique. The MPAA demanded that 42 seconds be cut to avoid an X rating. This resulted in the beheading and the meat grinder scene being heavily trimmed for the film's domestic theatrical run, in addition to a shot of the burnt pimp. In the U.K., the movie was cut separately, but left a similar 44 seconds on the editing table. Most major markets received a version that was cut in some way, except Japan.

== Release ==
=== Marketing ===
The film's sales were overseen by the fledgling J&M agency of London, which saw it as a potential breakthrough product and pushed it heavily. To hype it in the run-up the Cannes Film Market, Glickenhaus spent $150,000 in trade magazine ads. Whereas most competitors would limit previews to industry members, he gave away tickets on the streets of Cannes, and it was the common folk's reaction that sold the picture to distributors. The entire non-domestic rights were gone within four hours, and it immediately made its money back. In the U.S., it was acquired by independent distributor AVCO Embassy Pictures, marking the first collaboration between Glickenhaus and AEP executive Leonard Shapiro. The two would later become partners in Shapiro-Glickenhaus Entertainment.

The film's Cannes slogan was "If you're lying, I'll be back.", which was taken from a piece of dialogue. Although it was not retained by the U.S. distributor, it remained on the U.K. poster, and became a popular quote among British youths around release. A U.S. TV station refused to run a commercial for the movie, as they thought the spectacular Vietnam footage had been stolen from Apocalypse Now. For its New York opening, TV screens showing clips of the film were placed in theater lobbies, a relatively novel practice at the time.

=== Theatrical ===
The Exterminator opened in the Tri-State area on September 10, 1980, a Wednesday rather than the traditional Friday. The date coincided with Rosh Hashanah, which was an attempt to tap into New York's large Jewish audience, and helped the film to its strong start in the market. It expanded to other markets in the following months, opening in Los Angeles on October 17.

In the U.K., The Exterminator was released by Alpha Films. It opened at select London theaters on January 22, 1981, and citywide on January 25. In the country, the feature was supported by a Michael Armstrong short called Dreamhouse.

==== Ohio murder case ====
On September 22, 1980, a man was stabbed following a screening of The Exterminator at the Summit Drivin-In Theater in Coventry Township, Ohio, and later died from his injuries. The victim's mother filed suit for $1.6 million against the theater and distributor AVCO Embassy, claiming that the film's violence had contributed to the incident. The lawsuit was dismissed three years later, although a witness surfaced in 1987, claiming that he had heard the perpetrator say "I am the Exterminator." According to a friend who accompanied the victim, the suspect—a black male—made disparaging comments about the U.S. Marines, whose shirt the victim—a Caucasian male—was wearing, leading to an altercation that escalated out of view. The suspect later told an acquaintance that a racial slur uttered during the argument had played a role in his violent outburst. Although his identity is known to the police, the case remains officially unsolved.

== Reception ==
=== Box office ===
The Exterminator debuted at the top of Variety's Top 50, as the magazine's estimates were based on a sample of theaters mostly located in large markets, which favored non-wide releases like it. Virtually all of that early revenue came from the New York metro, and the film's big city success came as a surprise to the producers, who had primarily tailored it for export. According to one source, it ended up making $4 million (or $5 million) in domestic rentals ("rentals" in this context meaning the remaining gross after theater operators took their cut, which often left slightly less than half of the overall intake). In Screen International's charts, it was the number one film in London during its British opening week.

=== Critical reception ===
The Exterminator was poorly received by critics, who found few merits to its cinematic aspects, and staunchly disapproved of the titular character's ethics. At an advance screening six months before the film's release, Roger Ebert of the Chicago Sun-Times criticized a "sick example of the almost unbelievable descent" that American movies had taken "into gruesome savagery". He called it a "direct rip-off" of Death Wish. In trade magazine Variety, the reviewer credited as Lor. deemed that "James Glickenhaus commits the major sin of shooting an action film with little action. [Instead, his] contrived script opts for grotesque violence in a series of glum, distasteful scenes". Jack Mathews of the Detroit Free Press denounced "a cynical, vile story of urban justice in which it's hard to tell the good guys from the bad", "as stupid in its conception as it is amateurish and gory in its execution", and whose "cast is uniformly pitiful". Donna Chernin of The Cleveland Plain Dealer wrote that "[t]he film degenerates into an orgy of destruction as The Exterminator becomes as perverted as the people he sets out to punish." She advised those wishing to see the film to "go on an empty stomach." Michel Marriott of the Louisville Courier-Journal called it "a nasty little film that grows on you like a mosquito and is about as socially redeeming as a housefly." He pointed to "unconvincing acting" and "a disjointed story line" where "only its opening moments are even worth watching", concluding: "The timing may be good, but the film certainly isn't." Linda Gross of the Los Angeles Times was appalled by the film's "nauseatingly graphic acts of violence committed against persons unable to defend themselves", which "makes sadists of us all." She called the film "slick, racist and depraved" due to its representation of New York as "presided over the CIA, organized crime and gangs of ethnic minorities."

A few critics found the R-rated cut less graphic than expected, although they remained unimpressed overall. Alex Keneas of Newsday noted that the camera was "squeamish, more often cutting away from the blood and gore". He granted that "Glickenhaus does well with early Vietnam scenes" but accused the film of "distorting for its own ends the image of New York", deeming it "weakly manipulative." Comparing it with Death Wish and Dirty Harry, Tom Buckley of The New York Times decreed that "[t]hose films look like high art in comparison with this one. Even connoisseurs of violence will be disappointed in The Exterminator since its grisly events are not actually shown on screen." He added that "[t]he leading performers [...] are undone by the screenplay and direction of a beginner named James Glickenhaus and by lighting, camera work and sound that would rate an F at film school."

=== Retrospective ===
On Rotten Tomatoes, the film has an approval rating of 38%, based on 13 reviews, with an average rating of 4/10. Donald Guarisco of AllMovie found that "[d]espite its exploitative nature and morally questionable take on vigilante tactics, The Exterminator is tough to disregard altogether because it is surprisingly well made." He added that that "Robert Ginty brings a believable sense of anger and weariness to John and Christopher George's turn as Dalton is infused with plenty of sly wit." However, he bemoaned "the film's need to shock and its constant barrage of sleaze and gory violence." Den of Geek's Phil Beresford gave a mixed review. He stated that while Ginty is "not the greatest or most charismatic" of actors, "his essential ordinariness really works within the confines" of the film.

== Post-release ==
=== Television ===
The film was broadcast on premium cable channel Showtime before its home video debut. It premiered on March 6, 1982.

=== Home media ===
At the time of the film's theatrical release, AVCO Embassy had a domestic video output deal with the 20th Century Fox-owned Magnetic Video. They offered Glickenhaus to add his movie to the agreement against a one-time payment of $25,000. Glickenhaus asked for $30,000, but as the medium was still in its infancy, Fox did not properly assess that revenue stream and turned him down. Glickenhaus retained the rights and later made more than $1 million from them.

The Exterminator arrived in U.S. stores in the last week of January 1983 through Embassy Home Entertainment. The film was released on VHS, Betamax and CED. In the U.K., the film was released in July 1981 by Intervision on VHS, Betamax and V2000 tapes. It was re-issued by Anchor Bay Entertainment on a region free DVD on September 29, 1998. It debuted on region free Blu-ray on September 13, 2011, through Synapse Films.

== Legacy ==
In a 1982 interview, Glickenhaus claimed that the film had grossed $30 million worldwide. A 1984 New York Times article mentioned that the film had generated $35 million in revenue. That amount included ancillary rights such as television and home video.

Owing to its graphic violence, The Exterminator has remained moderately controversial since its release. In their book A History of Evil in Popular Culture, Dr. Sharon Packer and Jody Pennington claimed that its "extreme justice" was a contributing factor to the film's success, as the "audience loved it". Ginty was initially a vocal supporter of the film, telling the UPI news agency: "When I go back to New York and I see how frightened everyone is, I think the vigilante philosophy is justified. [...] The subway system was the pride of New York, now it's a jungle. The theatre district and Times Square were fascinating places to have fun. Now they are a no man's land with warnings about how to protect your life. [...] The last time I visited my old high school in Brooklyn, the windows were barred to keep the wrong people out. It looked like a prison instead of a school. There are parts of New York that are virtually war zones." A few years later, the star had somewhat distanced himself from the movie's contents, telling The New York Times: "I don't mind talking about it. But I separate very clearly my politics from my acting."

Director Ryuhei Kitamura has named the film as an influence on his decision to become a filmmaker. He later released the movie's soundtrack and a line of licensed apparel through his personal merchandise company.

== Soundtrack ==
The film's original score was composed by Joe Renzetti, who was introduced to Glickenhaus by a mutual acquaintance, concert promoter Murray Barber. The soundtrack also included several licensed songs. Some were commissioned specifically for the movie, in part through Barber's connections in the country scene. Among them were a pair from ATV Music artist Roger Bowling, "Theme for an America Hero" by Chip Taylor and "Kali Au", written for the Stan Getz Orchestra by its guitarist Chuck Loeb. The disco hit "Disco Inferno" is also featured as diegetic music in one scene.

The film's score was slated to be released for the first time on a limited edition LP in 2018 through Pure Destructive Records, but it was delayed and the label eventually went bankrupt. Instead, the LP was released on November 18, 2022, by Japanese label Xrosscounter Music. It marked the first release of "Heal It", although this is the only song featured. Xrosscounter also issued "Heal It" on 7-inch concurrently with the LP. A CD version followed in the week of May 22, 2023, from the same company.

The Exterminator
- Author: Peter McCurtin
- Language: English
- Genre: Thriller
- Publisher: Manor Books
- Publication date: 1980
- Publication place: United States
- Media type: Print (Paperback)
- Pages: 207
- ISBN: 9780532233206

== Novelization ==
Glickenhaus' screenplay was adapted into a paperback novel, which was published by Manor Books. It was written by Peter McCurtin, a prolific pulp writer and editor. Manor's editor at the time, John S. Littell, was McCurtin's former assistant at Belmont Tower. McCurtin then left BT to work freelance, and Littell hired him for this book on the basis of their prior collaborations.

== Sequel ==
A sequel called Exterminator 2 was released in 1984 through Cannon Films. Ginty and producer Mark Buntzman returned, with Buntzman doubling as director.

== Bibliography ==
- Gallagher, John Andrew (1989). "James Glickenhaus". Film Directors on Directing. Westport: Praeger Publishing. pp. 57–74. ISBN 0275932729.
- Talbot, Paul (2011). "The Exterminator burns its way to Blu-ray". Screem. No. 23. Wilkes Barre: Screem Publishing. pp. 16–21.
- Packer, Sharon & Pennington, Jody (2014). A History of Evil In Popular Culture. United States: Praeger Publishing. ISBN 9780313397707.
- Scullion, Chris (2013). That Was A Bit Mental: Volume 1. United Kingdom: Self published (E-book). ISBN N/A.
