= Lorna Patterson =

American actress (born 1956)

- Born: July 1, 1956 (age 69); Whittier, California, U.S.
- Occupation: Actress
- Years active: 1979–1993

Lorna Patterson (born July 1, 1956) is an American retired film, stage and television actress. As an actress, her best-known roles were as Randy, the singing stewardess, in Airplane!, and as the lead in the television series Private Benjamin.

== Biography ==
Patterson was born in Whittier, California, where she attended Rio Hondo College for a single semester. Patterson began her professional career while still in high school, performing melodrama at The Bird Cage Theatre at Knott's Berry Farm.

== Career ==
She is a founding member of the Musical Theatre Guild and has appeared in many stage musicals.

She played Randy, the blonde stewardess in the 1980 comedy Airplane!. She co-starred with Tony Randall in the 1981 television pilot Sidney Shorr: A Girl's Best Friend. By the time this became the television series Love, Sidney, she had won the lead role in the 1981–1983 television version of the film Private Benjamin, so her Sidney Shorr role was played in Love, Sidney by Swoosie Kurtz. Earlier, she had been a regular on two short-lived series, Working Stiffs and Goodtime Girls. She also played Liz Drever in 1984, in The Flying Doctors, episodes 2, 3 and 4, in Australia.

Patterson has also lent her voice to some animated productions including the TV series Timeless Tales from Hallmark, the direct to video film Joseph and his Brothers from The Greatest Adventure: Stories from the Bible, the English dub of the Japanese anime film Ultraman: The Adventure Begins and the Christmas special Nick & Noel.

== Personal life ==
Patterson converted to Judaism a few years after marrying Michael Lembeck (his faith). In 2009 she received her cantorial ordination from the Academy for Jewish Religion in Los Angeles.

== Filmography ==
Year	Title	Role	Notes
1979	Working Stiffs	Nikki Evashevsky	Main cast (8 episodes)
1979	Lou Grant	Girl	Episode: "Samaritan"
1979	Beane's of Boston	Shirley Brahms	TV pilot episode
1979	The Lovebirds	Janine Burley	TV film
1980	Goodtime Girls	Betty Crandall	Main cast (13 episodes)
1980	Angie	Sissy	Episode: "Angie and Brad's Close Encounter"
1980	Airplane!	Randy	Feature film
1981–83	Private Benjamin	Pvt. Judy Benjamin	Main cast (39 episodes)
1981	Sidney Shorr: A Girl's Best Friend	Laurie Morgan	TV film
1984	Hawaiian Heat	Alexis	Episode: "Yankees vs. the Cubs"
1984	The Impostor	Julie	TV film
1985	The Flying Doctors	Liz Drever	TV miniseries
1987	Ultraman: The Adventure Begins	Susan Rand (voice)	TV film
1987	Hotel	Nancy Stanton	Episode: "Revelations"
1989	Murder, She Wrote	Edie Lorraine	Episode: "The Search for Peter Kerry"
1990	Timeless Tales from Hallmark		Episode: "Rumpelstiltzkin"
1990	The Greatest Adventure: Stories from the Bible		Episode: "Joseph and His Brothers"
1991	Major Dad	Sgt. Tammi Rae Perkins	Episode: "Anything You Can Do I Can Do Perky"
1993	Basic Values: Sex, Shock & Censorship in the 90's		TV film
1993	Nick & Noel	Leslie (voice)	TV film
