= Frankenhooker =

1990 film by Frank Henenlotter

- Theatrical release poster
- Directed by: Frank Henenlotter
- Written by: Robert Martin; Frank Henenlotter
- Produced by: Edgar Ievins
- Starring: James Lorinz; Patty Mullen; Charlotte Helmkamp; Louise Lasser
- Cinematography: Robert M. Baldwin
- Edited by: Kevin Tent
- Music by: Joe Renzetti
- Production company: Levins-Henenlotter
- Distributed by: Shapiro-Glickenhaus Entertainment
- Release dates: April 1990 (Houston); June 1, 1990
- Running time: 84 minutes
- Country: United States
- Language: English
- Budget: $2.5 million
- Box office: $205,068

Frankenhooker is a 1990 American comedy horror film co-written and directed by Frank Henenlotter. The film is an homage to and parody of Mary Shelley's 1818 novel Frankenstein, and stars James Lorinz and former Penthouse Pet Patty Mullen. After his fiancée is decapitated by a lawnmower, medical school dropout Jeffrey Franken attempts to resurrect her by assembling the body parts of prostitutes, unwittingly creating a nymphomaniacal monster.

== Plot ==
Jeffrey Franken, a young man who lives in Ho-Ho-Kus, New Jersey, is a power plant worker and an amateur scientist who specializes in bioelectricity. He is about to marry his fiancée Elizabeth. At the birthday party of Elizabeth's father, Jeffrey presents him with an automatic lawnmower as a gift, but when Elizabeth tries to demonstrate it, she is caught in its path and gruesomely killed.

Jeffrey, in his grief, begins plotting to use his knowledge of circuits to rebuild Elizabeth and bring her back to life. His grief drives him to have mock dinner dates with the few pieces of Elizabeth he could salvage, as well as performing self-trepanations with a power drill to help himself calm down. He decides to make the perfect new body for Elizabeth, by harvesting the bodies of seven New York City prostitutes.

After meeting several women and their abusive pimp Zorro, a muscle-bound temperamental crack dealer, Jeffrey tricks Zorro into letting him rent every one of the women for a single night to find the one with the perfect body for Elizabeth by lying about having them over for his brother's "birthday party". Inspired by a news report about crack cocaine causing the deaths of many New York prostitutes, he then develops a "super-crack" which he finds causes living beings to explode. Deciding he is doing nothing wrong as crack will probably kill the prostitutes anyway, Jeffrey lures them all into a hotel room under the guise of a "medical examination" and marks the women with the body parts he wants for Elizabeth. However, as he begins to have second thoughts, the prostitutes find the bag of super-crack and all smoke it despite Jeffrey's pleas, causing them all to explode into pieces.

Zorro hears the commotion and rushes to the room, only to be knocked out by the flying head of one of his women. Jeffrey hurriedly puts the body parts into trash bags, promising to restore the women once he brings Elizabeth back. After picking the perfect body parts and sewing them and Elizabeth's head together into a single body, Jeffrey uses the lightning from a nearby storm to shock Elizabeth's new body to life again. However, her body and face move awkwardly, and she can only repeat what the previous women said before they died. The "Frankenhooker" escapes the basement and begins looking for clients in New York, who end up exploding from electricity when they try getting intimate with her.

Jeffrey goes looking for Elizabeth and finds her at a bar. Zorro is there too, and upon hearing Elizabeth mention his name and recognizing her body parts, he angrily strikes her so hard that her head mostly detaches from her body. Jeffrey evades Zorro and takes Elizabeth home to repair her neck and revive her again.

After bolting her head more securely to her new body, Jeffrey awakens Elizabeth, finding her memory restored. At first, Elizabeth is impressed that Jeffrey brought her back, but becomes furious when she realizes what her body is now made of and how Jeffrey obtained the parts. Jeffrey tries to explain himself, but he is attacked and decapitated by Zorro, who has followed him home. Zorro then attempts to drag Elizabeth away with him, justifying himself by claiming that most of her new body belongs to him. However, the spare prostitute parts have also been reanimated by the storm and merged into multiple grotesque monsters, which overwhelm Zorro and drag him away into their storage cooler to his presumed death, along with his drugs.

Elizabeth decides to revive Jeffrey via the same procedure he used on her, but since the process only works on female bodies, Elizabeth is forced to put Jeffrey's head on a body made of the prostitutes' body parts to bring him back. As Jeffrey awakens, Elizabeth happily says they will be together forever as Jeffrey moans in horror at his new female body.

== Cast ==
- James Lorinz as Jeffrey Franken
- Patty Mullen as Elizabeth Shelley/Frankenhooker
- Charlotte Kemp (credited as Charlotte Helmkamp) as Honey
- Lia Chang as Crystal
- Jennifer DeLora as Angel
- Heather Hunter as Chartreuse
- Kimberly Taylor as Amber
- Shirley Stoler as Spike
- Louise Lasser as Mrs. Franken
- Joanne Ritchie as Mrs. Shelley
- J. J. Clark as Mr. Shelley
- Carissa Channing as Dolores
- Shirl Bernheim as Elizabeth's grandmother
- Helmar Cooper as Detective Anderson
- Joseph Gonzalez as Zorro
- Paul-Felix Montez as Goldie

== Release ==
Frankenhooker's initial release was delayed because of difficulty obtaining an R rating from the Motion Picture Association; the director recalls that one representative of the ratings body actually said, in a phone call to the production company's secretary, "Congratulations, you're the first film rated S." And she said, "S? For sex?" And they said, "No, S for shit." To his dismay, Henenlotter's conservative parents insisted on attending the film's premiere in New York City; Henenlotter expressed surprise that they were not offended by the exploitative elements.

=== Home media ===
Frankenhooker was released on VHS in 1990, by Shapiro-Glickenhaus Entertainment, and had an interactive box which had the titular character exclaim "wanna date?!" when you pressed a button on the box.

On November 8, 2011, Synapse Films released Frankenhooker on Blu-ray. This edition has reversible cover art, with the original theatrical poster on one side and newly commissioned artwork on the reverse side. The disc contains a 2K high definition transfer of the film and a digitally remastered 5.1 audio mix, as well as an audio commentary track from writer/director Frank Henenlotter and make-up effects designer Gabe Bartalos, three featurettes and the original theatrical trailer. The special features from this release were also available on the DVD version of the film, released on September 10, 2013.

On January 2, 2012, Arrow Films released a special edition Blu-ray of Frankenhooker. Like the Synapse release before it, this edition also has reversible cover art, featuring both the original theatrical poster art and newly commissioned art (different from the Synapse version). This edition includes many UK exclusives, including an audio commentary from Henenlotter and star James Lorinz, a documentary titled "Your Date's on a Plate" and a tour of Gabe Bartalos' effects lab in Los Angeles. It also includes all three featurettes from the Synapse release, as well as trailers for the films Basket Case, Basket Case 2 and Brain Damage, all of which were also directed by Henenlotter.

== Reception ==
On the review aggregator website Rotten Tomatoes, the film holds an approval rating of 60% based on 20 reviews. Variety wrote, "Frankenhooker is a grisly, grotesque horror comedy recommended only for the stout of heart and strong of stomach." Vincent Canby of The New York Times wrote that "there is a legitimate sense of the absurd lurking within Frank Henenlotter's Frankenhooker", but it is "overshadowed by special effects" and elements that recall softcore pornography. Kevin Thomas of the Los Angeles Times called it a "hilarious, totally outrageous grin-and-gore comedy."

James Lowder reviewed Frankenhooker in White Wolf Inphobia #55 (May, 1995), rating it a 2 1/2 out of 5 and stated that "Frankenhooker caused something of a stir when it first arrived in video stores. The display box had a sound chip in it. When some unsuspecting browser lifted the box, it blurted the stereotypical hooker's call of 'Wanna date?' in a loud and obnoxious voice. Humorless store owners and some humorless customers were not amused."

Frankenhooker was named "Killer B Film of the Year for 1990" by E! Entertainment Television's Attack of the Killer B's segment.

Bill Murray was quoted as saying "If you see one movie this year, it should be Frankenhooker." Henenlotter said that Murray had been editing his film Quick Change and hung out with the Frankenhooker crew. After Murray expressed interest in their film, the distributor started calling Murray's office, attempting to get an endorsement from him, and Murray did not return the calls. Embarrassed that they would abuse Murray's friendliness, Henenlotter attempted to avoid Murray. When they eventually ran into each other, Henenlotter apologized and explained that he was not responsible for the calls to Murray's office. Satisfied with the explanation, Murray volunteered a quotation.

== See also ==
- List of films featuring Frankenstein's monster
