= Basket Case 3: The Progeny =

1991 film by Frank Henenlotter

- DVD cover art
- Directed by: Frank Henenlotter
- Written by: Frank Henenlotter; Robert Martin
- Produced by: James Glickenhaus; Edgar Ievins; Leonard Shapiro
- Starring: Kevin Van Hentenryck; Annie Ross
- Cinematography: Robert Paone
- Edited by: Greg Sheldon
- Music by: Joe Renzetti
- Distributed by: Shapiro-Glickenhaus Entertainment
- Release dates: October 31, 1991 (MIFED (Mercato internazionale del film e del documentario), Italy); February 15, 1992 (Waverly Theater); February 21, 1992 (U.S.)
- Running time: 90 minutes
- Country: United States
- Language: English

Basket Case 3: The Progeny is a 1991 American horror comedy film written and directed by Frank Henenlotter. It is the third and final installment of the Basket Case series. It was released on DVD by 20th Century Fox Home Entertainment in 2004. Synapse Films released a new DVD on October 9, 2012. Troma Entertainment released the film on its streaming service Troma Now! on October 1, 2021.

== Plot ==
After crudely trying to sew his monstrous former conjoined twin Belial back onto his side at the end of the previous film, Duane Bradley is reseparated from Belial and put in a straitjacket and padded cell in Granny Ruth's haven for "unique" (deformed) individuals.

After several months of captivity, Duane is released by Granny Ruth, who is preparing to take everyone on a road trip to the home of her ex-husband, Doctor Hal Rockwell. He will help in giving birth to Belial's equally misshapen girlfriend Eve's babies. Before leaving for the trip, Granny Ruth sternly tells Duane to stay away from Belial, who has stopped speaking to Duane telepathically after Duane's attempt to put them back together.

While traveling via bus to Hal's house in Peachtree County, the group stops at a drug store, where Granny Ruth meets local sheriff Andrew Griffin while Duane, attempting to wriggle out a bus window, meets the sheriff's daughter Opal, whom he tries to convince to help Belial and him escape. Before Duane can talk to Opal any further, Granny Ruth returns, boards the bus, and heads back on track to Hal's house, having sweet-talked Sheriff Griffin into letting her leave despite the bus being illegally parked.

Eventually reaching Hal's home, Duane escapes out a window after Granny Ruth decides to give him a chance and removes his straitjacket; as Duane is imprisoned by Opal and several officers in the local jail, Eve prepares to give birth, which is complicated when Belial mauls Hal, the sight of him in surgical attire causing him to remember his original separation from Duane. With Hal incapacitated, Belial is drugged to calm him down, and the birth of Eve and his 12 children is overseen by Little Hal, the multiarmed and blob-like prodigy son of Hal and Granny Ruth. Shortly after Eve and Belial's children are born, Deputies Bailey and Baxter break into the Rockwell house, having realized a million-dollar reward has been offered for the capture of both Duane and Belial. While the freaks party, Bailey and Baxter find the sleeping babies, and mistaking the groggy Eve for Belial, shoot and kill her before fleeing with the babies when the freaks come after them.

At the police station, Sheriff Griffin finds his daughter in the midst of trying to seduce Duane in dominatrix attire and sends her away, shortly before Bailey and Baxter arrive with the babies. Griffin sends Bailey and Baxter back to their homes and goes off to see what is going on at the Rockwell residence, leaving Officers Brennan, Banner, and Brody in charge of the station. Breaking into the Rockwell house, Sheriff Griffin finds Granny Ruth and the freaks in the midst of mourning the dead Eve, and the sheriff, disturbed by the sight of the freaks and Little Hal, hurries back to the station, which Belial had broken into. As Belial attacks Brennan, Banner, and Brody, Opal releases Duane from his cell, hoping he can stop Belial. Belial kills Brennan by crushing his throat (causing his eyes and teeth to pop out) and rips Banner's head off before trying to maul Brody, who accidentally blasts Opal (who crushes one of the babies in her death throes) with his shotgun prior to having his neck snapped by Belial. Putting Belial in his basket, Duane runs from the station just as Sheriff Griffin appears and opens fire, injuring Belial. Wanting to help Belial reclaim his babies and take revenge on the remaining police, Duane makes up with Belial and has Little Hal construct a robotic exoskeleton for him, which Belial uses to butcher Bailey and Baxter.

At Eve's funeral, Granny Ruth rallies the grieving freaks, and they all travel to the police station, where Sheriff Griffin, grieving over his dead daughter, offers them a deal: Belial for the babies. Granny Ruth agrees to the sheriff's offer and tells him to show up at an abandoned factory on the outskirts of town for the trade; after the meeting at the station, Granny Ruth and the freaks ransack a fast-food restaurant, scaring away all the customers, much to the chagrin of the staff.

Arriving at the factory with the babies and a shotgun for protection, Sheriff Griffin is ambushed by Belial and the two fight; Belial has the upper hand due to his exoskeleton. After seemingly killing Sheriff Griffin with a blow to the head from his mechanical claw, Belial goes to retrieve his children, but the recovered sheriff ambushes and trips him. Flailing about in his armor, Belial scores a hit against Sheriff Griffin, who is swarmed and killed by the babies when he falls into their cradle.

With the babies reclaimed, Granny Ruth, Duane, Belial, and the freaks attack a talk show entitled Renaldo; Belial mauls the titular host. Speaking into the camera, Granny Ruth tells the world that the freaks will no longer hide in the shadows and will fight back if oppressed. She finishes her speech by telling everyone to have a nice day.

== Cast ==
- Kevin Van Hentenryck as Duane Bradley and Belial Bradley (voice; uncredited)
- Annie Ross as Granny Ruth
- Gil Roper as Sheriff Griffith
- Tina Louise Hilbert as Opal Griffith
- Dan Biggers as Uncle Hal
- Jim O'Doherty as Hal "Little Hal"
- Jackson Faw as Bailey
- Jim Grimshaw as Baxter
- Carla Morrell as Twin #1
- Carmen Morrell as Twin #2
- David Milford as Brody
- Tim Ware as Brennan
- Jerry G. White as Banner
- Beverly Bonner as Fast Food Manager
- Jeff Winter as Renaldo
- Berl Boykin as David
- Denise Coop as Eve
- James Derrick as Basil
- Donna Hall as Arthur "Huge Arthur"
- Dean Hines as "Mouse Face"
- Larry Hurd as "Twister"
- Cedric Maurice as Cedric
- Diane Oxford and Pearl
- Wendy Parham as "Brainiac"
- Pierre Perea as Simon
- Fernando Perez-Lee as "Half Moon"
- Bunny Phipps as Mackerel
- Heather Place as Ellice
- Marty Polak as "Toothy"
- Charles Portney as "Platehead"
- James Scott as Frederick
- William J. Scully as Leon
- Rick Smailes as Man With 27 Noses
- Dominic Marcus as Belial Bradley (additional vocal effects) and Unique Individuals (voices; uncredited)
- Regina Stewart as Eve and Belial's Babies (voices; uncredited)
- Heather Rattray as Susan Smoeller (archive footage; uncredited)
- Richard Pierce as Mr. Bradley (archive footage; uncredited)
- Diana Browne as Dr. Judith Kutter (archive footage; uncredited)
- Bill Freeman as Dr. Julius Lifflander (archive footage; uncredited)
- Lloyd Pace as Dr. Harold Needleman (archive footage; uncredited)
- Sean McCabe as Young Duane (archive footage; uncredited)
- Tim Kearns as Sam Umbacho (uncredited)

== Production ==
=== Development ===
During the filming of Basket Case 2 and Frankenhooker, producer James Glickenhaus of Shapiro-Glickenhaus Entertainment requested a third installment in the Basket Case series. Writer-director Frank Henenlotter initially agreed only if he could also make Voodoo Doll, a film that he had written. Voodoo Doll would remain unproduced due to financial issues. Henenlotter admitted that he did not have a proper idea for a story for the film, and just ad-libbed much of the film on the spot. He described the production as a "disaster", and would apologize to co-writer Robert Martin for the quality of the scenes that he delivered. The film was originally titled Basket Case 3: The New Generation, but was changed to Basket Case 3: The Progeny.

Following the film's production and release, Henenlotter tried to get other projects made. He failed to find investors, who expressed interest in doing another sequel to Basket Case. Henenlotter took a hiatus from filmmaking until his return with Bad Biology in 2008.

=== Filming ===
Production was initially set to begin in New York City in July 1990, with a budget of $2 million. However, filming eventually took place Senoia, McDonough and Conyers in Georgia instead. The film was shot in 27 days.

=== Casting ===
Kevin Van Hentenryck, Annie Ross and other actors who had appeared in Basket Case 2 returned to reprise their roles. Henenlotter initially wanted the film to have unrated gore scenes similar to the first film, such as in the scene where Eve gives birth to her and Belial's babies. This was rejected by Shapiro-Glickenhaus, who wanted the gore to be toned down, forcing him to remove 11 pages of the script during filming. Actor Jim O'Doherty, who played Little Hal, improvised his lines out of hysteria in a single-take shot for the scene. Despite the poor quality of the film, Henenlotter enjoyed working with the cast, and praised Van Hentenryck's role as Duane, which he played "completely straight" despite the deterioration of the character's mental state. While filming Gil Roper's alliteration line for Sheriff Griffith, Henenlotter had to leave the set because he was laughing so much. Beverly Bonner called Henenlotter, asking him if she could appear in the film. Henenlotter asked Bonner to come to the set of the film, and she was cast as a fast food cashier at Mighty Casey's.

=== Special effects ===
Most of the costumes for the "unique individuals" were recycled from Basket Case 2. Gabriel Bartalos created some new individuals for the film at his company Atlantic West Effects, based on designs that he was unable to make for Basket Case 2. Additional makeup effects were done by Greg Baker, John Deall, David Dupuis, Joel Harlow, Lance Jacobson, David Kindlon, Bruce Larsen, and Michael O'Brien. The scene in which Belial kills Brennan was originally going to use blood, but the blood was removed after Shapiro-Glickenhaus' decision to make the film less gory, leaving the effect unfinished.

=== Music ===
The music was written and composed by Joe Renzetti. The film features a cover of "Personality" by Lloyd Price, performed by Annie Ross (as Granny Ruth) and the "Renzettes" (the "unique individuals"). While the production was trying to get the rights to the song, Lloyd and Logan Music licensed it for a dollar upon learning that Ross would be singing it.

== Reception ==
Variety wrote, "Henenlotter's mix of wild over-acting, cartoon color scheme and heavy-handed message regarding tolerance is tough to take for the uninitiated. His fans will enjoy seeing the growing menagerie of creatures, including the cute/grotesque progeny." Ian Jane of DVD Talk rated it 3/5 stars and called it "far from Henenlotter's best film" but "a lot of fun".

== See also ==
- List of films featuring powered exoskeletons
