= Basket Case 2 =

1990 film by Frank Henenlotter

- Promotional release poster
- Directed by: Frank Henenlotter
- Written by: Frank Henenlotter
- Produced by: Edgar Ievins
- Starring: Kevin Van Hentenryck
- Cinematography: Robert M. Baldwin
- Edited by: Kevin Tent
- Music by: Joe Renzetti
- Distributed by: Shapiro Glickenhaus Entertainment
- Release date: March 2, 1990
- Running time: 90 minutes
- Country: United States
- Language: English
- Budget: $2,500,000

Basket Case 2 is a 1990 American comedy horror film written and directed by Frank Henenlotter, and the sequel to his 1981 film Basket Case. It stars Kevin Van Hentenryck reprising his role as Duane Bradley, who moves with his deformed, formerly conjoined twin brother Belial into a home for "unique individuals" run by their deceased aunt's friend, eccentric philanthropist Granny Ruth (played by Annie Ross).

The film spawned another sequel, Basket Case 3: The Progeny, in 1991.

== Plot ==
After falling from a hotel window at the end of the first film, Duane Bradley and his deformed, surgically separated conjoined twin brother Belial are taken to the hospital. Their unusual situation draws media attention, making it impossible to lead a secret life. They are rescued from the hospital by Granny Ruth, who saw their story on the news. She takes them to her home, where she and her granddaughter Susan care for an extended family of similarly deformed individuals. Among these individuals is Eve, who is similar to Belial in that she is a bodyless torso. Traumatized by how she has been treated prior to Ruth rescuing her, Eve is mute and spends most of her time in the attic. A few years pass and as Eve and Belial fall in love, Duane's resentment of Belial grows. He hasn't forgiven Belial for Sharon's murder and wishes to live a life without being surrounded by "freaks", as previously he had been unable to leave Belial due to their psychic bond.

During all of this a sleazy reporter named Marcie and her equally sleazy photographer Arty have been looking for the Bradley brothers in order to bring them to justice. Upon discovering the freaks, Marcie decides that she will expose them to the world, forcing Ruth and the others to stop her. They kill Arty, as well as a private detective named Phil who was assisting Marcie. Duane and the other freaks break into Marcie's house after having obtained the address from a note in Phil's wallet; Belial mutilates her face, turning her into a freak as well.

That night the freaks celebrate their victory while Eve and Belial consummate their relationship in the attic. Seeing this as an opportunity to finally be free of Belial, Duane approaches Susan and asks her to run away with him. She is horrified that he would leave his brother and reveals that she, too, is a freak. She has been pregnant for six years as her baby refuses to leave her womb; upon revealing this, a grotesque lamprey-like creature emerges from Susan's surgical wounds where failed cesarean sections have been attempted. This shatters the last of Duane's psyche and he accidentally kills Susan by pushing her out a window. He then goes to Belial and forcibly sews him to his body. The film ends as Ruth and the others discover what Duane has done, and stare at him horrified while Duane says it's all right now that they're “together again”.

== Cast ==
- Kevin Van Hentenryck as Duane Bradley and Belial Bradley (voice; uncredited)
- Annie Ross as Granny Ruth
- Kathryn Meisle as Marcie Elliott
- Heather Rattray as Susan Smoeller
- Jason Evers as Lou, The Editor
- Ted Sorel as Phil
- Judy Grafe as News Woman
- Chad Brown as News Man
- Beverly Bonner as Casey
- Leonard Jackson as Police Commissioner
- Alexandra Auder as Nurse Sherri
- Brian Fitzpatrick as Cop
- Gale Van Cott as Desk Clerk
- Kuno Sponholz as Sick Old Man
- Dominic Marcus as Security Guard, Belial Bradley (additional vocal effects) and Unique Individuals (voices; uncredited)
- Doug Anderson as Snoring Cop
- Jan Saint as Lyle Barker
- Matt Mitler as Arty
- Michael Rubenstein as Clancy
- George Andros Aries as "Worm Man"
- Deborah Bauman as "Mouse Face"
- Marianne Carlson as Arthur "Huge Arthur"
- David Emge as "Half Moon"
- James Farley as Pearl
- Ron Fazio and Joseph Leavengood as Leon
- Tom Franco as "Frog Boy"
- Jeri LaShay as Ellice
- Matt Malloy and Jeffrey Danneman as "Toothy"
- Jody Oliver as "Brainiac"
- Nick Roberts as "Platehead"
- Michael Rogen as Man With 27 Noses
- Sturgis Warner as Frederick "The Pinhead"
- Denise Coop as Eve (uncredited)
- Richard Pierce as Mr. Bradley (archive footage; uncredited)
- Diana Browne as Dr. Judith Kutter (archive footage; uncredited)
- Bill Freeman as Dr. Julius Lifflander (archive footage; uncredited)
- Lloyd Pace as Dr. Harold Needleman (archive footage; uncredited)
- Sean McCabe as Young Duane (archive footage; uncredited)

== Production ==
=== Development ===
Following the cult success and financial returns of Basket Case, writer-director Frank Henenlotter met producer James Glickenhaus of Shapiro-Glickenhaus Entertainment. Henenlotter was trying to sell a script for a film named Insect City, a homage to monster movies from the 1950s, which had been turned down by other studios. Glickenhaus liked the script but knew that it would not sell. When asked what other ideas that he had, Henenlotter made up the plot of Frankenhooker on the spot, and agreed to develop a sequel to Basket Case. Henenlotter had initially not planned a sequel and wanted the characters of Duane and Belial Bradley to die after their fall, but did not want to rehash the first film, and wrote a new screenplay, having the characters survive their fall at the beginning and move into a home for "unique individuals". The film was originally called House of Freaks and would have focused on the unique individuals, with Duane having a small role. Shapiro-Glickenhaus insisted that the film be named Basket Case 2 and Duane have a much larger role.

=== Filming ===
The film had a budget of $2.5 million, compared to the original film's budget of $35,000. This allowed for more ambitious creature designs, practical effects and set construction, with funding secured through Shapiro-Glickenhaus. The film was shot back-to-back with Frankenhooker on August 30, 1989 – October 10, 1989, being filmed in parts of Plainfield, New Jersey (including the Tuesday Afternoon Club as the home for the "unique individuals") and Newark, New Jersey. Scooter McCrae worked as a production assistant in the art department. During production of both films, Henenlotter drank Jolt Cola to stay awake, to the point where Jolt Cola agreed to sponsor the production.

=== Casting ===
Kevin Van Hentenryck was brought on to reprise his role as Duane Bradley. Henenlotter cast Annie Ross as Granny Ruth to help raise the film's finance and generate interest in it from buyers and investors. Kathryn Meisle was cast in her first film role as Marcie Elliott. Matt Mitler was cast as Arty. David Emge played the role of "Half Moon".

=== Special effects ===
Gabe Bartalos was hired by Henenlotter to design the 22 "unique individuals"; both wanted to avoid using real-life deformities and came up with exaggerated, cartoonish ones instead. Instead of using stop-motion like in the first film, Belial's movements were achieved through the use of animatronic puppetry, also designed by Bartalos. Additional makeup effects were done by Barbara Anne Bock, Andy Clement, Gino Crognale, Dan Frye, Joel Harlow, Bill Messina, Nick Santeramo, and Paul Sciacca.

=== Music ===
The film's score was written and composed by Joe Renzetti.

== Reception ==
The staff of Variety called Basket Case 2 "a hilarious genre spoof" that pays homage to the 1932 film Freaks. Kevin Thomas of the Los Angeles Times complimented the film's atmosphere, which he felt was aided by the cinematography and score, and highlighted Ross and Van Hentenryck's performances. He wrote that Basket Case 2 "has everything it needs to become the cult film that its 1982 predecessor has been: outrageous dark humor, bizarre horror, driving energy and genuine pathos."

Joe Kane of the New York Daily News gave the film a mostly positive review, commending its "dark wit" and exploration of Duane and Belial's romantic pursuits. He wrote that, "While the interior-bound sequel lacks the original's sleazy Times Square ambience, and most of the flick's secondary freaks are more whimsical than menacing in design [...] Basket Case 2 stacks up as fun fear fare for Basket Case cultists, fright-film fans and adventurous viewers of every stripe." The New York Times' Caryn James wrote, "As cheap horror spoofs go, this one isn't all bad", but lamented a perceived deviation from an initial "tongue-in-cheek approach" as the film progresses, writing, "Twenty minutes or so into the movie, there is very little left to surprise you, except an exceptionally tacky ending."

In his 2011 book Horror Films of the 1990s, John Kenneth Muir opined that Basket Case 2 was "disappointing" and that it "eschews all the qualities that made the down-and-dirty, low-budget original such a great pleasure."

On the review aggregator website Rotten Tomatoes, the film has an approval rating of 86% based on seven surveyed critics, with an average rating of 6.3/10.

== Home media ==
Basket Case 2 was released on DVD and Blu-ray by Synapse Films on October 30, 2007, and August 9, 2016. In the United Kingdom, the film was released as part of Basket Case: The Trilogy by Second Sight Films on October 22, 2012, and March 14, 2016.

== Sequel ==
The film was followed by another sequel, Basket Case 3: The Progeny, released in 1991.
