= Shapiro-Glickenhaus Entertainment =

American film production and distribution company

- Industry: Film production and distribution
- Predecessor: Shapiro Entertainment Corporation
- Founded: 1987
- Founders: Leonard Shapiro, James Glickenhaus
- Defunct: 1995

Shapiro-Glickenhaus Entertainment was a company formed at the height of the home video industry in 1987 by producer Leonard Shapiro and director James Glickenhaus to produce and distribute low-budget horror and action films. The company's films were heavily distributed through video rental stores and late night cable channels.

== History ==
The company known also as SGE or Shapiro Entertainment Corporation (SEC) during the company's earlier years, which was initially set up by Leonard Shapiro, Kelly Ross, and Alan Solomon, who merged its firm with Glickenhaus Films, a firm headed by James Glickenhaus in 1987, with a conjunction production agreement in the works, and had a domestic theatrical unit that was headed by firm Jerry Landesman, which specializes in regional theatrical releases, and whose video unit was known as SGE Home Video would produce 14 films and distribute more than 100 pick-up films in its 12 years of operation. While Shapiro Entertainment was founded, it signed a deal to distribute Bill Wyman Presents, a two-hour music video movie.

SGE's home video titles were distributed by the Video Sales Organization (VSO) under the label SGE Home Video until 1991 when MCA/Universal began to distribute the SGE catalog. The company, at one time, owned a television syndication division, SGE Television, to handle television sales of the catalog, to be headed by Sy Shapiro. On February 17, 1991, SouthGate Entertainment and SGE had to negotiate plans about planning on to merge their video distribution links. Both suppliers combined their sales offices in March 1991, and decided to maximize their potential and increase their market share.

On February 24, 1991, SGE announced they would scrap production of smaller budget films in favor of producing a single big-budget film. The Video Sales Organization, a joint venture between SGE and SouthGate went into dissolution on October 12, 1991, due to a lack of more lucrative titles.

As the home video industry evolved in the mid-1990s, SGE disbanded in 1995. Leonard Shapiro left the company in 1996 to form Rootbeer Films Inc. while James Glickenhaus would join a finance firm started by his father, Glickenhaus & Co.

In 1996, Alan M. Solomon, who served as executive vice president of SGE, along with Elliot Solomon, founded Amsell Entertainment, which bought the remaining assets and film catalog of SGE. Synapse Films, under license from North American Pictures, LLC, acquired the rights to some SGE film titles and scheduled the releases of Frankenhooker and Maniac Cop on Blu-ray in Fall of 2011, as well as Red Scorpion in Summer of 2012 and a new DVD of Basket Case 3: The Progeny in fall 2012. Synapse has also acquired the rights to release a new Blu-ray of McBain. Blu-Rays of Basket Case 2 and Basket Case 3: The Progeny have been released by Synapse as well.

In April 2021, Troma Entertainment acquired the ex-Shapiro Glickenhaus catalog.

=== Works ===
Although SGE would never create a breakout or blockbuster film, cult film fans may recognize some of SGE's works. Films such as Basket Case 2, Frankenhooker, Maniac Cop, Moontrap, McBain, and Red Scorpion were released theatrically and often found a wider audience when released on home video and on cable television. Maniac Cop and Red Scorpion proved successful in the video era, each spawning sequels,, while SGE also launched a third Basket Case film, Basket Case 3. Red Scorpion SGE's widest theatrically released feature, screening at 1,268 screens in the U.S. and bringing in over $4 million at the box office.

The company's final film, Timemaster, released in 1995, was directed and written by James Glickenhaus and starred his son, Jesse Cameron-Glickenhaus.

=== Controversies ===
SGE was involved in two high-profile controversies.

Though Red Scorpion was the distributor's most widely released theatrical film, it was also its most controversial. The Jack Abramoff produced feature was dropped by Warner Bros. when protest groups claimed that the involvement of the South African government in the film's creation violated the United Nations cultural boycott against the Pretoria government. The tumult hadn't died down when the film was picked up by SGE and released in April 1989. Five protest groups picketed at the film's opening weekend in Washington, D.C. Protesters carried placards that read "Red Scorpion No! Freedom Yes!" and shouting "Red Scorpion is no good. Send it back to Pretoria!"

Less than a year later, controversy also surrounded SGE's feature film Frankenhooker, one of the last films to receive an X rating from the Motion Picture Association of America The company appealed twice with two editorial changes and could not persuade the MPAA to drop the X-rating to an R-rating. As a result, SGE released the film in 1990 with a self-attached "A" label.

== Notable Films ==
- No Retreat, No Surrender 2 (1987)
- Pledge Night (1988)
- Red Scorpion (1988)
- Shakedown (1988)
- Maniac Cop (1988)
- The Wizard of Speed and Time (1988)
- Death Spa (1988)
- Black Roses (1988)
- Moontrap (1989)
- Basket Case 2 (1990)
- Frankenhooker (1990)
- Maniac Cop 2 (1990)
- Legal Tender (1991)
- McBain (1991)
- Basket Case 3: The Progeny (1991)
- Tiger Claws (1992)
- TC 2000 (1993)
- Slaughter of the Innocents (1993)
