= McBain (film) =

1991 film directed by James Glickenhaus

- Theatrical release poster
- Directed by: James Glickenhaus
- Written by: James Glickenhaus
- Produced by: J. Boyce Harman Jr.
- Starring: Christopher Walken; María Conchita Alonso; Michael Ironside; Steve James; Jay Patterson; T. G. Waites; Victor Argo; Hechter Ubarry; Russell Dennis Baker; Chick Vennera
- Cinematography: Robert M. Baldwin
- Edited by: Jeffrey Wolf
- Music by: Christopher Franke
- Production companies: Shapiro-Glickenhaus Entertainment
- Distributed by: Shapiro-Glickenhaus Entertainment
- Release date: September 20, 1991
- Running time: 107 minutes
- Country: United States
- Language: English
- Budget: $16 million
- Box office: $456,127

McBain is a 1991 American action war film written and directed by James Glickenhaus, and starring Christopher Walken, María Conchita Alonso, and Michael Ironside. Walken portrays the title character, an ex-soldier employed to overthrow the corrupt dictator of Colombia. It was released by Shapiro-Glickenhaus Entertainment on September 20, 1991.

== Plot ==
During the American withdrawal from Vietnam in 1973, prisoner-of-war Lieutenant Bobby McBain is liberated by a number of soldiers, including Roberto Santos, who gives McBain half of a $100 bill, saying that if the other half ever comes back to McBain, he can repay Santos. Years later, Santos attempts to lead a revolt in Colombia to overthrow the corrupt president. When his revolt fails and he is killed, his sister Christina goes to New York to find McBain and present the bill. McBain agrees to help, recruits his old war buddies, raises some cash by extorting a crooked businessman, and leads an attack to topple the Colombian president.

== Cast ==
- Christopher Walken as Bobby McBain
- Michael Ironside as Frank Bruce
- Steve James as Eastland
- María Conchita Alonso as Christina Santos
- Victor Argo as the President of Colombia
- Thomas G. Waites as Gill
- Chick Vennera as Roberto Santos
- Jay Patterson as Dalton
- Forrest Compton as President Flynn
- Luis Guzmán as Papo
- Dick Boccelli as John Gambotti
- Hechter Ubarry as Simon Escobar
- Russell Dennis Baker as Daly
- Raoul Aragon as Lt. Vargas
- Michael Joseph De Sare as Maj. Tenny
- Cris Aguilar as Sing Lau
- Protacio Dee as General Ho
- David Tamayo Pegram as Armado
- Marshall Thompson as Mr. Rich
- Roy Alvarez as Lopez

== Production ==
The film was announced in May 1990, under its original title McBain's Seven. In September of that year, it was announced that filming would begin shooting on a sixty-two day schedule under its shortened title McBain. While the film received offers from several major studios for distribution, production company Shapiro-Glickenhaus Entertainment ultimately decided to release the film themselves committing an estimated $8–$10 million for promotion and the manufacture of 1200 film prints as selling distribution rights would've meant relinquishing the home video rights.

Filming took place in the Philippines (doubling for Colombia) and New York City.

== Release ==
=== Home media ===
The movie was released on videocassette in the United States in 1992 by MCA/Universal Home Video and in Canada that same year by C/FP Video. Goodtimes released the budget tape of the movie some years later. Synapse Films stated an intention to release McBain on Blu-ray from a newly restored 2K transfer. Rifftrax released a video on demand version of the movie on January 25, 2013, including the running mocking commentary by stars of Mystery Science Theater 3000 including Mike Nelson, Kevin Murphy and Bill Corbett.

== Reception ==
=== Box office ===
The film took in less than $500,000 at the box office in the United States.

== In popular culture ==
McBain is also the name of an action movie character on the animated sitcom The Simpsons played by the character of Rainier Wolfcastle, an analogue of Arnold Schwarzenegger. His appearance on The Simpsons predated the release of the film, and apart from the name, the film has no relation to the character. Nonetheless, the Simpsons writers eventually phased out the use of the name 'McBain' to avoid a potential lawsuit.
