= Patty Mullen =

American actress and model

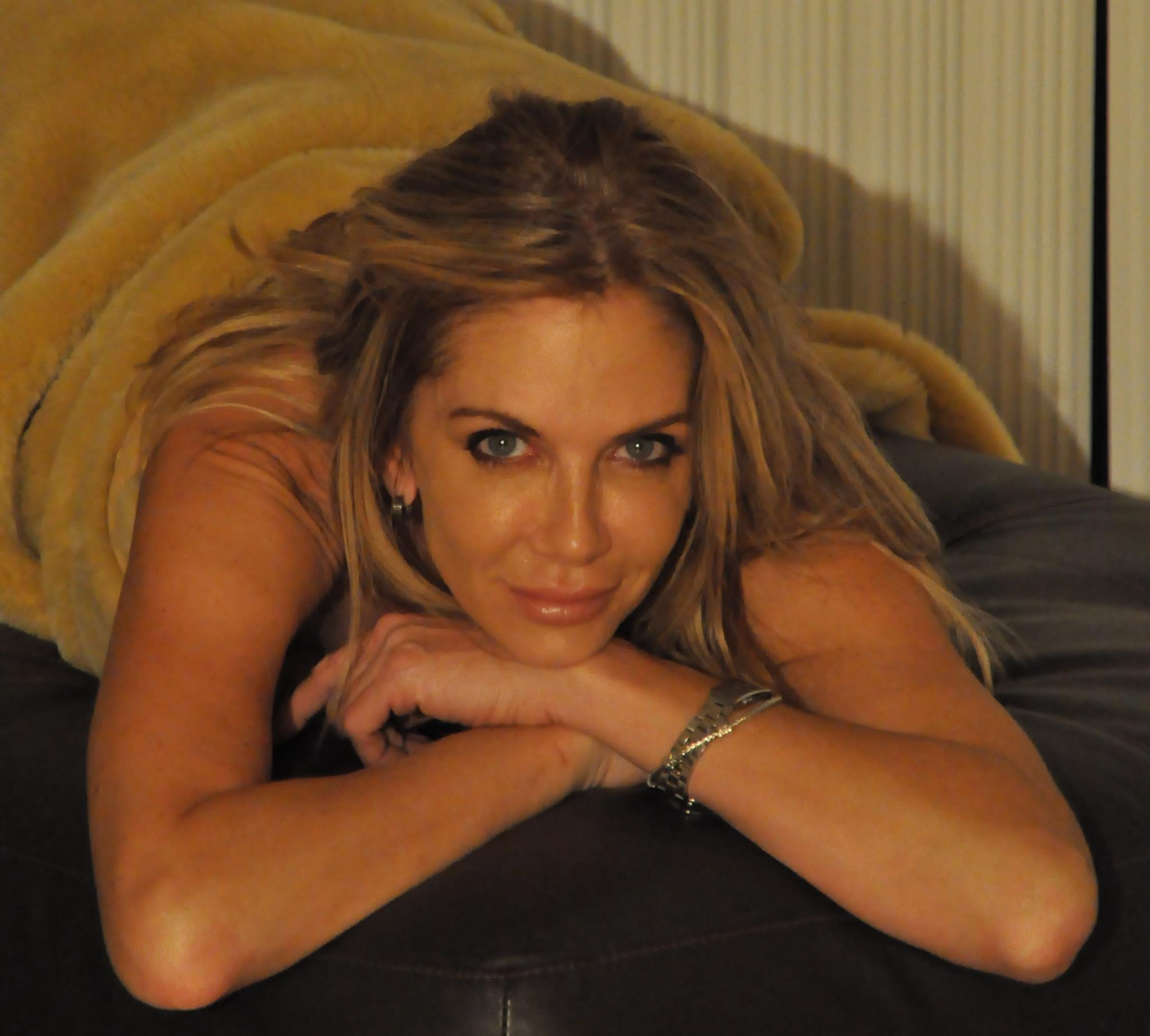
- Born: Staten Island, New York City, U.S.
- Occupations: Actress; model
- Years active: 1986–1990

Patty Mullen is an American actress and model. She is best known as Elizabeth Shelley in 1990's Frankenhooker.

== Career ==
Mullen is known for her starring role in the 1990 film Frankenhooker, as well as for her dual role in the 1987 film Doom Asylum. Mullen was the August 1986 Penthouse magazine Pet of the Month and two years later was selected as the 1988 Pet of the Year. She was one of the judges at Clash of the Champions I.

== Filmography ==
=== Film ===
Year	Title	Role	Notes	Ref.
1988	Doom Asylum	Judy and Kiki LaRue		
1990	Frankenhooker	Elizabeth Shelley		
2025	Strange Toys	Daisy Doll (voice)		

=== Television ===
Year	Title	Role	Notes	Ref.
1989	The Equalizer	Teresa	Episode: "Heart of Justice"	

1970s	Evelyn Treacher	Stephanie McLean	Tina McDowall	Patricia Barrett	Avril Lund
1970s	Anneka Di Lorenzo	Laura Bennett Doone	Victoria Lynn Johnson	Dominique Maure	Cheryl Rixon
1980s	Isabella Ardigo	Danielle Deneux	Corinne Alphen	Sheila Kennedy	Linda Kenton
1980s	None	Cody Carmack	Mindy Farrar	Patty Mullen	Ginger Miller
1990s	Stephanie Page	Simone Brigitte	Jisel	Julie Strain	Sasha Vinni
1990s	Gina LaMarca	Andi Sue Irwin	Elizabeth Ann Hilden	Paige Summers	Nikie St. Gilles
2000s	Juliet Cariaga	Zdeňka Podkapová	Megan Mason	Sunny Leone	Victoria Zdrok
2000s	Martina Warren	Jamie Lynn	Heather Vandeven	Erica Ellyson	Taya Parker
2010s	Taylor Vixen	Nikki Benz	Jenna Rose	Nicole Aniston	Lexi Belle
2010s	Layla Sin	Kenna James	Jenna Sativa	Gina Valentina	Gianna Dior
2020s	Lacy Lennon	Kenzie Anne	Amber Marie	Tahlia Paris	Renee Olstead
2020s	Kassie Wallis	-	-	-	-
