= List of films featuring powered exoskeletons =

There is a body of feature films, mainly live-action, featuring powered exoskeletons. (Note: Cyborgs refer to beings with both organic and biomechatronic parts, and are distinct from exoskeletons. A person wearing an exoskeleton is generally not a cyborg. Thus, films featuring cyborgs, such as RoboCop, are not listed here.; Mechas refer to giant robots such as humanoid walking vehicles that are piloted by people, and are distinct from exoskeletons. Thus, films featuring mechas, such as Pacific Rim and Robot Jox, are not listed here.) Popular Mechanics said the growth of visual effects at the start of the 21st century allowed for such exoskeletons to be featured more prominently in live-action films. LiveScience said in 2013 that it was fairly common to see powered exoskeletons in films and that it helped educate the public about potential real-life use.

== List of films ==
Film	Year	Ref.
Aliens	1986	
The Amazing Spider-Man 2	2014	
The Ambushers	1967	
Avatar: The Way of Water	2022	
The Avengers	2012	
Avengers: Age of Ultron	2015	
Avengers: Endgame	2019	
Avengers: Infinity War	2018	
Basket Case 3: The Progeny	1992	
Batman & Robin	1997	
Batman v Superman: Dawn of Justice	2016	
Black Panther: Wakanda Forever	2022	
Blue Beetle	2023	
Captain America: Civil War	2016	
District 9	2009	
Edge of Tomorrow	2014	
Elysium	2013	
Exo-Man	1977	
G.I. Joe: The Rise of Cobra	2009	
The Guyver	1991	
Guyver: Dark Hero	1994	
Halo 4: Forward Unto Dawn	2012	
Invasion	2020	
Iron Man	2008	
Iron Man 2	2010	
Iron Man 3	2013	
The Master Mystery	1919	
Spider-Man: Homecoming	2017	
Star Kid	1998	
Starship Troopers 3: Marauder	2008	
The Wolverine	2013	
The Wrong Trousers	1993	

== See also ==
- List of films featuring mechas
