= Frank Henenlotter =

American film director (born 1950)

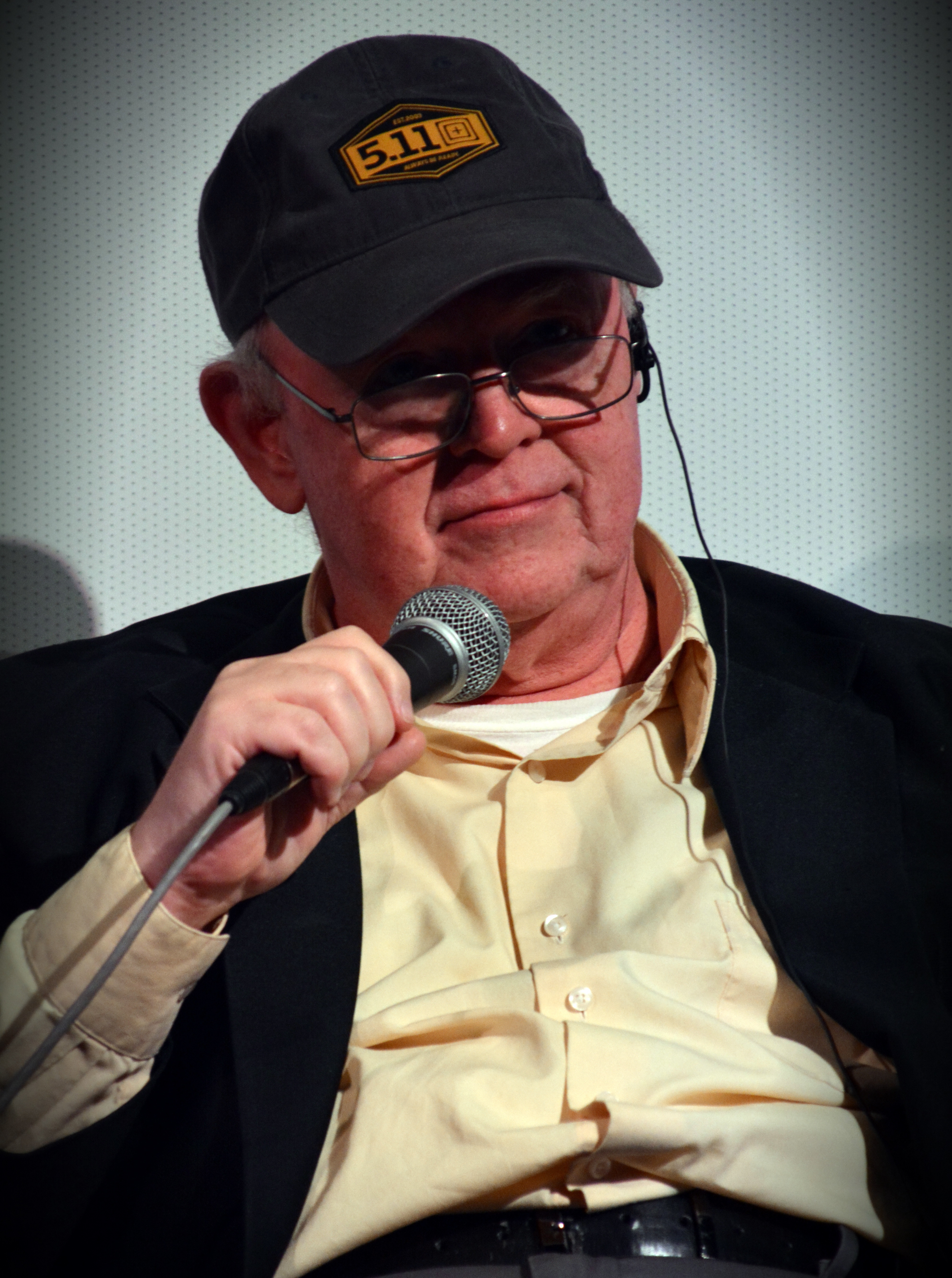
- Henenlotter at the Extrême Cinéma film festival in France, 2016
- Born: August 29, 1950 (age 76); New York City, New York, U.S.
- Occupations: Film director; screenwriter; film historian

Frank Henenlotter (born August 29, 1950) is an American film director, screenwriter and film historian. He is known primarily for directing horror comedies, especially Basket Case (1981), Brain Damage (1988), and Frankenhooker (1990).

Despite being known as a horror filmmaker, Henenlotter has expressed a preference for being classified as an "exploitation" filmmaker, stating in 2010: "I never felt that I made 'horror films'. I always felt that I made exploitation films. Exploitation films have an attitude more than anything – an attitude that you don't find with mainstream Hollywood productions. They're a little ruder, a little raunchier, they deal with material people don't usually touch on, whether it's sex or drugs or rock and roll."

== Early life ==
Henenlotter was born in New York City in 1950. In a 1982 interview with Fangoria, Henenlotter recalled 1946's Valley of the Zombies as being the first film he remembers seeing, which he watched on television around 1958. He also remembered seeing The Wolf Man (1941) on TV at an early age, as well as The Tingler (1959) in a theater at age nine. Around age 14, Henenlotter began making films on 8 mm.

== Career ==
Henenlotter's films were inspired by the exploitation and sexploitation films he loved, such as those that played on 42nd Street in New York City in the 1960s and 1970s. His first 16 mm short film, The Slash of the Knife, was completed in 1976. It was at one point intended to be screened alongside a midnight showing of Pink Flamingos in New York, but this plan was abandoned due to the former reportedly being deemed too offensive (later speaking to Fangoria, Henenlotter stated, "Can you imagine a film too offensive to play with Pink Flamingos?").

During the production of Slash of the Knife, Henenlotter met producer Edgar Ievins, and the two eventually collaborated on an unrealized film project titled Ooze. Henenlotter recalled, "We tried to get the money for Ooze and couldn't, so I just wrote a film that could be made for far less money. Right out in front, I wrote a film that was designed to be made for a low, low budget." The resulting screenplay of Henenlotter's first feature film, Basket Case, was written by Henenlotter as he walked around Times Square, which he called a "seedy, wonderful atmosphere." Although shot on 16 mm film on a budget of about $35,000, it was blown up to 35 mm for its original theatrical release in 1982, and despite receiving mixed reviews upon release, Basket Case has since become considered a cult film.

=== Hiatus and return ===
Following Basket Case 3: The Progeny, Henenlotter became deeply involved in the release slate of the specialty video releasing outfit Something Weird Video; he has also been instrumental in rescuing many low-budget sexploitation and exploitation films from being destroyed, including the camp classic The Curious Dr. Humpp (1971). Many of these works have been released under Something Weird's specialty logo "Frank Henenlotter's Sexy Shockers."

During the 16 years following Basket Case 3, a number of Henenlotter feature projects came close to production, including "Sick in the Head," Henenlotter's first script collaboration with R.A. the Rugged Man, at one point scheduled to be produced under the aegis of Fangoria magazine; but, coincident with the general economic downturn, financing evaporated. Henenlotter has also noted the conflicts he had with producers over the film, who caused Henenlotter to exit the project after urging him to re-edit his script to be "more like Saw." R.A. subsequently was able to find a new deal and very modest financing through his music industry contacts, so Bad Biology was conceived to be shot for an extremely low budget, for extremely limited, unrated theatrical play, and subsequent video release. Right before production was to begin, Henenlotter was notified of a cancer diagnosis. He elected to persist with the production while receiving radiation treatment. Though only attendees at film festivals and special film events have had the opportunity to see the film (shot on traditional 35mm at Henenlotter's insistence) projected in a theater, Henenlotter claims the low budget, independent financing and the decision to forgo the ratings process allowed him a level of freedom he has been missing since his earliest films. Bad Biology was scheduled for video release in January 2010 by Media Blasters. Henenlotter appeared as himself in the documentary film Herschell Gordon Lewis – The Godfather of Gore and narrated the film on the 2010 FanTasia. In issue #304 Frank and comic artist Joshua Emerick started the Basket Case comic strip for Fangoria. The three panel strip runs in each issue.

Henenlotter appeared in the 2013 documentary film Rewind This!, about the impact of VHS on the film industry and home video. He also appeared with the film's director, Josh Johnson, when it screened at film festivals such as the Telluride Horror Show. In 2014, he directed Chasing Banksy, which was screened with a visit of Henenlotter at New York City Forbidden Planet.

== Filmography ==
Feature films

Year	Title	Director	Writer	Editor	Notes
1976	The Slash of the Knife	Yes	Yes	No	Short film
1981	Basket Case	Yes	Yes	Yes	
1988	Brain Damage	Yes	Yes	Yes	
1990	Basket Case 2	Yes	Yes	No	
1990	Frankenhooker	Yes	Yes	No	Also additional photography
1991	Basket Case 3: The Progeny	Yes	Yes	No	
2008	Bad Biology	Yes	Yes	Yes	
2015	Chasing Banksy	Yes	Yes	Yes	

Documentaries

Year	Title	Director	Writer	Editor	Notes
2010	Herschell Gordon Lewis: The Godfather of Gore	Yes	No	Yes	Co-directed with Jimmy Maslon
2013	That's Sexploitation!	Yes	Yes	Yes	Co-directed and co-wrote with Donald A. Davis and David F. Friedman
2018	Boiled Angels: The Trial of Mike Diana	Yes	No	No	Documentary film

== Bibliography ==
- Martin, Bob (December 1981). "Basket Case". Fangoria. Vol. 3, no. 16. Starlog Group, Inc. ISSN 0164-2111.
