= Moontrap =

1989 film by Robert Dyke

- Video release poster by Tom Jung
- Directed by: Robert Dyke
- Written by: Tex Ragsdale
- Produced by: Robert Dyke; John Cameron; James A. Courtney; Stephen A. Roberts
- Starring: Walter Koenig; Bruce Campbell; Leigh Lombardi; Robert Kurcz; John J. Saunders
- Cinematography: Peter Klein
- Edited by: Kevin Tent; Steven C. Craig
- Music by: Joseph LoDuca
- Production company: Magic Films
- Distributed by: Image Entertainment (LaserDisc); Malofilm Home Video; Shapiro-Glickenhaus Home Video (video)
- Release date: April 28, 1989
- Running time: 92 minutes
- Country: United States
- Language: English
- Budget: $3.6 million

Moontrap is a 1989 American science fiction film produced by Magic Films. Written by Tex Ragsdale and directed by Robert Dyke, it was released on April 28 at WorldFest Houston. A comic book adaptation, featuring the film's production notes, was released in the same year by Caliber Comics. The cast features Walter Koenig and Bruce Campbell as modern-day astronauts, with Leigh Lombardi as an ancient astronaut from a forgotten human civilization. They face an alien invasion by a race of predatory cyborgs.

== Plot ==
On July 21, 1969, a robotic eye emerges from the lunar soil and observes the landing module of the Apollo 11 mission taking off.

Twenty years later, the Space Shuttle Camelot encounters a derelict spaceship in orbit around Earth. Mission commander Colonel Jason Grant leaves the Shuttle to investigate. He discovers a reddish-brown pod and a mummified human corpse. Both are brought back to Earth, where it is found that they originated on the Moon some fourteen thousand years ago.

Shortly thereafter, the unattended pod comes to life. It constructs a cybernetic body with parts from the lab and pieces of the ancient corpse. The cyborg kills a lab technician and exchanges fire with security guards before Grant destroys it with a shotgun blast to the head.

Using the last completed Apollo rocket, Grant and fellow astronaut Ray Tanner go to the Moon on a search-and-destroy mission. They discover the ruins of an ancient human civilization. Inside, they find a woman in suspended animation who identifies herself in a rudimentary fashion as Mera and reveals the name of the killer cyborgs — the Kaalium.

They survive a Kaalium attack and return to the Lunar Module, with Mera wearing her own spacesuit, but the module is gone. The Kaalium also shoot down the command module, leaving the astronauts stranded on the Moon. In subsequent attacks by the Kaalium, Tanner is killed while Grant and Mera are taken prisoner. The Kaalium head to Earth in a giant ship with the humans aboard.

Grant and Mera free themselves and find the landing module, which has been enmeshed in the ship's machinery. Grant supposes the module was the last piece of equipment that the Kaalium needed to complete their ship. He starts the module's self-destruct sequence before he and Mera exit through a breach in the hull, using his gun's recoil as a propellant. The ship explodes after they have reached safe distance.

Some time later, Grant and Mera are shown as a couple living on Earth. Having learned to speak English, Mera explains that she was put in stasis to warn others about the Kaalium. Grant reassures her that the Kaalium have been defeated. Later, a Kaalium pod that survived the explosion is shown in a junkyard preparing to build itself a new body.

In a post-credits audio clip, Grant speaks to a NASA official about the possibility of any debris that may have fallen to Earth in the aftermath of the ship's explosion. The official dismisses his concerns and assures Grant that any debris from the alien ship would have burned up in the atmosphere.

== Cast ==
- Walter Koenig as Colonel Jason Grant
- Bruce Campbell as Ray Tanner
- Leigh Lombardi as Mera
- Robert Kurcz as Koreman
- John J. Saunders as Barnes
- Reavir Graham as Haskell
- Tom Case as Beck

== Production ==
Robert Dyke, who headed Detroit based film studio, Magic Lantern Studios, specialized in commercials and special effects, but had always had an interest in science fiction. In 1986, Dyke teamed up with friend Tex Ragsdale, another science fiction fan and an ad exec at Detroit’s Smith Winchester Agency, to come up with the script for Moontrap.

Dyke approached B. K. Taylor at a local comic book convention and recruited him as a production designer on the film, with Taylor crafting the look of both the monsters and the alien civilization in a way that he hoped would be reminiscent of a 50s George Pal produced sci-fi film.

== Reception ==
Moontrap received negative reviews from critics. The movie holds a 29% rating on review aggregator Rotten Tomatoes. IMDb gives the movie a 5 out of 10. DVDtalk had a higher opinion of the movie, stating that for a low-budget picture it often exceeds expectations. In its review of December 27, 1989, Variety stated "Moontrap is a very entertaining though highly derivative sci-fi adventure ... this one's a goodie ... Moontrap is exciting and suspenseful."

== Release ==
Shapiro-Glickenhaus Entertainment had initially intended for the film to be a regional theatrical release, but ultimately released the film direct-to-video.

A Blu-ray DVD was released on the 25th anniversary of the movie in September 2014. The movie had previously only been officially released on VHS.

== Sequel ==
In a 1990 interview, James Glickenhaus of Shapiro-Glickenhaus Entertainment noted he and Robert Dyke were prepping a sequel to Moontrap to be titled Moontrap 2: The Pyramids of Mars. However, that film was not made, due to the studio's financial issues.

On April 17, 2011, Robert Dyke and Tex Ragsdale launched a fundraising campaign for a Moontrap 2 graphic novel that would be adapted into a movie. The project was intended "to act as a presentation device to show potential backers of the hoped-for film what it's going to be about. More effective than a script alone in that it not only tells the story but shows what the film will look like." However, due to lack of contributions the project was cancelled on June 1 of the same year.

In early 2014, another project was announced by Robert Dyke and Tex Ragsdale. On February 5, a Facebook account was created for Moontrap Target Earth. The first post said, "Watch this space for news about Moontrap Target Earth, now in pre-production with the original Moontrap creative team." Two days later, a post on the Moontrap Target Earth page confirmed the legitimacy of the new project: "Moontrap Target Earth is not a direct sequel to the original feature but, instead, a new stand-alone adventure." The plot is described as "an archaeological dig uncovers a long-buried spacecraft from an ancient, advanced human civilization. A young woman studying the ship suddenly finds herself transported to the Moon, to unlock an ancient mystery." Pre-production began in February and filming commenced in April at the Motion Picture Institute in Michigan.

The cast includes Sarah Butler as Scout, the main character; Charles Shaughnessy as Richard Kontral, the ruthless agent of a shadowy organization; and Damon Dayoub as Allen, an adventurer who joins a mission to expose a world-changing secret. Other cast members include Niki Spiridakos, Tarick Salmaci, Chris Newman, Jennifer Kincer, Jon Ager, Cara AnnMarie and D.B. Dickerson.

On February 7, 2017, Sony Pictures Home Entertainment released Moontrap: Target Earth.
