= Robert Martin (editor) =

American writer and magazine editor (1948–2020)

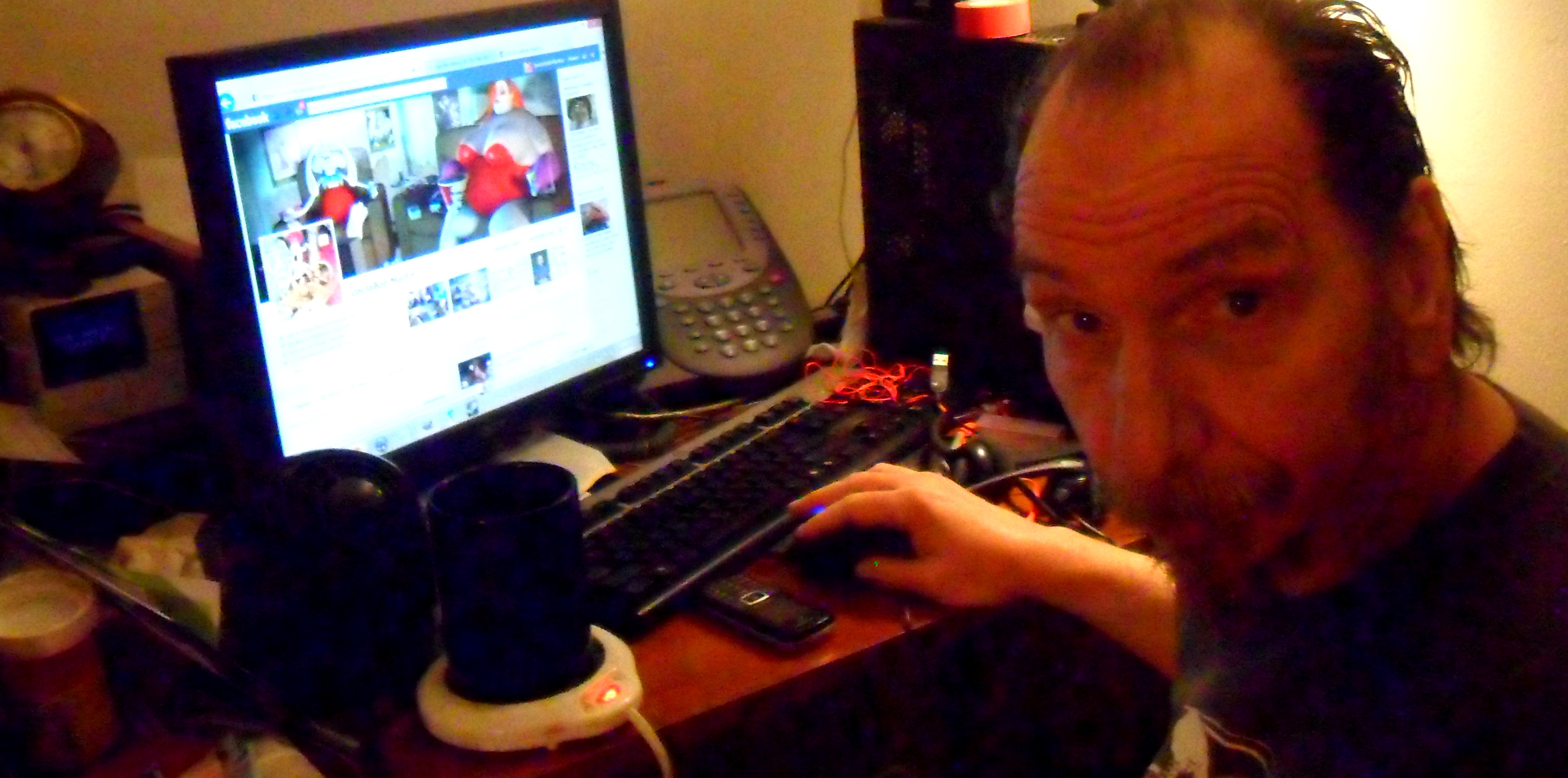
- Photo by Lily Kwan, February 2013
- Born: October 8, 1948
- Died: July 20, 2020 (aged 71)
- Occupation(s): Writer, editor
- Known for: Fangoria
- Notable work: Frankenhooker, Basket Case 3: The Progeny

Robert "Bob" Martin (October 8, 1948 – July 20, 2020) was the original editor of Fangoria, an American horror film fan magazine. Martin steered the publication from 1979 to 1986, during which slasher films were popular.

== Career ==
A collaborative relationship with writer-director Frank Henenlotter resulted in a novelization Martin adapted from Henenlotter's feature film Brain Damage and two produced screenplays, Basket Case 3: The Progeny and Frankenhooker, with Martin writing initial drafts from Henenlotter's detailed outlines. In 1994, Martin, under the name "Ed Flixman" became editor of Sci-Fi Entertainment (later renamed to Sci Fi magazine), the "official magazine" of the Sci-Fi Channel, and continued in that capacity through October 1996. His column of film news continued to run in that magazine, until a blistering argument with the new editor regarding remarks in Martin's column that the new editor feared might incur the wrath of the Sci-Fi Channel.

In December 1996, Martin relocated from his native New York to Los Angeles, where he mostly worked as an Internet techie, but also wrote press materials for a few films, most notably The People vs. Larry Flynt, in which his description of Flynt as "the last champion of the sexual revolution" stirred the wrath of Gloria Steinem, generating considerable press for the film. (In Martin's original, the phrase had been "the last champion of a failed sexual revolution.")

As of March 2006, he was working as a blackjack dealer in Las Vegas. That career was cut short by a stroke that left him incapable of handling cards or chips as professionally required. After a period spent on disability, Martin joined the horror portal Dread Central as a regular contributor in May 2009.

== Death ==
Robert Martin died on July 20, 2020, at age 71.
