= Doom Asylum =

- Film Poster
- Directed by: Richard Friedman
- Screenplay by: Rick Marx
- Produced by: Steve Menkin
- Starring: Patty Mullen; Ruth Collins; Kristin Davis; William Hay; Kenny L. Price; Harrison White; Dawn Alvan; Michael Rogen
- Cinematography: Larry Revene
- Edited by: Ray Shapiro
- Music by: Dave Erlanger; Jonathan Stuart
- Distributed by: Filmworld/Academy Entertainment
- Release date: March 2, 1988
- Running time: 78 minutes
- Country: United States
- Language: English
- Budget: $90,000 (estimated)
- Box office: $476,340

Doom Asylum is a 1988 American comedy slasher film written by Rick Marx and directed by Richard Friedman.

In the film, a lawyer is disfigured in a car accident. He revives during his own autopsy and goes on a killing spree. A decade later, he lives in a mental asylum. He defends his new home against perceived intruders.

== Plot ==
In 1977, attorney Mitch Hansen and his fiancée Judy LaRue have an automobile accident in which Judy is killed and Hansen is apparently killed. Hansen wakes up during his autopsy, which leaves his face disfigured, and kills the medical examiners.

Ten years later, a group of friends, including Judy's daughter Kiki, goes to the asylum where a rock band trio, Tina and the Tots (Godiva and Rapunzel), practice their music loudly. Darnell turns off their music and a romantic connection is made between him and Rapunzel. Afterwards, the group sunbathes at the back and gets water balloons thrown at them by Tina and her bandmates. Darnell goes back into the asylum and is killed with a mortuary tool that crushes his skull.

The group realises that Darnell has not returned, so Mike goes to find him. Godiva goes into the asylum and sprays graffiti on the walls. Then in the bathroom, she is killed by Hansen, who dunks her head in the sink with liquid nitrogen to freeze her face. (Hansen, for most of the film, watches black-and-white classic films.) Dennis, the baseball card collector geek, loses his card which is blown by the wind to the side of the asylum, where he is killed with a drill to the head.

Mike reaches the roof and confronts Tina about Darnell's whereabouts, but Tina makes jokes and they fight, which ends with Mike hanging onto the side of the roof. Kiki and Jane enter and save Mike before he falls. Rapunzel goes to find Darnell but is killed by being strangled with a stethoscope. Tina searches for her bandmates. Mike, Kiki and Jane discuss their friends' disappearances and Jane decides to go look for them herself. Jane is killed by Hansen with a buzz saw. Tina witnesses the murder, but Hansen flees before Mike enters. Mike accuses Tina of the murder of Jane. Kiki yells in horror as she finds Darnell in a blood-covered bathtub.

Mike and Kiki pray for their missing friends and attempt to flee, but Mike is knocked out by an injection needle to the neck. Hansen drags Kiki to an autopsy room and holds her hostage as he picks up Mike and puts Mike onto the table. Mike is killed by cutting off his left toes with a pair of giant scissors. Tina comes in and fights with Hansen, which ends with Tina being killed by going through the body processor, which ejects a huge square of skin.

Kiki escapes the asylum and goes out into the fields, where she's caught by Hansen, who calls her "Judy". Kiki kicks him as he touches her face and runs away, then realises Hansen is crying. Hansen pulls out a newspaper clipping from his lab coat pocket. Kiki looks at it and realises that it shows her mother, Judy. Hansen explains that he and Judy were going to live together, knowing they planned to abandon her. Kiki angrily picks up her mother's mirror and stabs Hansen in the face with the handle. The film ends with Kiki walking out of the asylum grounds.

== Cast ==
- Patty Mullen as Judy LaRue / Kiki LaRue
- Ruth Collins as Tina
- Kristin Davis as Jane
- William Hay as Mike
- Kenny L. Price as Dennis
- Harrison White as Darnell Hart
- Dawn Alvan as Godiva
- Farin as Rapunzel
- Michael Rogen as Mitch Hansen
- Harvey Keith as Medical Examiner
- Steven G. Menkin as Assistant Medical Examiner (credited as Steve Menkin)
- Paul Giorgi as Fake Shemp

== Production ==
Principal photography was scheduled to begin on July 13, 1987. The film was shot in 8 to 12 days.

== Release ==
Doom Asylum had a theatrical screening in Milan Italy before it was officially released on home video in early 1988 through Academy Home Entertainment on VHS.

== Reception ==
In his overview of 1980s horror films, Scott Aaron Stine declared it similar to other horror comedy films, finding it neither funny nor scary and he said that the film was "sophomoric drivel, the jokes are stale and the special effects are mostly awful."
