= Jennifer DeLora =

American actress (born 1962)

- Born: March 2, 1962 (age 64); Kingston, New York, U.S.
- Occupations: Actress; educator; model
- Years active: 1982–present

Jennifer DeLora (born March 2, 1962) is an American model, actress, and educator.

She began her career as a beauty queen, and was crowned Miss Ulster County in her youth. She later established herself as an actress in B movies in the 1980s and 1990s, with roles in Robot Holocaust (1987), Young Nurses in Love (1987), Frankenhooker (1990), and Suburban Commando (1991).

She frequently appeared in mainstream films for director Chuck Vincent.

== Career ==
DeLora's film credits include minor roles in Soup for One (1982) and Robot Holocaust (1987), as well as the horror films Frankenhooker and Deadly Manor (both 1990). DeLora was crowned Miss Ulster County in 1986, but had the title revoked when it was discovered she had appeared nude on film. In 2015 she demanded a public apology for this.

DeLora subsequently earned a PhD in psychology, and has taught American Sign Language at New York University.

In 2016, she starred in the music video for "LA Devotee" by Panic! at the Disco.

=== Film Consultant ===
DeLora, who is Deaf and fluent in American Sign Language (ASL), taught the language to Ann-Margret in preparation for her role in Blue Rodeo (1996).

She also did consulting on the film After the Silence (1996), teaching Kellie Martin "how to act Deaf", as well as ASL to JoBeth Williams.

== Filmography ==
=== Film ===
| Year | Title | Role | Notes | Ref. |
|---|---|---|---|---|
| 1982 | Soup for One | Girl at Bar | | |
| 1986 | Bad Girls Dormitory | Lisa | | |
| 1987 | Robot Holocaust | Nyla | | |
| 1987 | Young Nurses in Love | Bunny | | |
| 1987 | Deranged | Mary Ann | | |
| 1988 | Sensations | Della Randall | | |
| 1989 | Cleo/Leo | Bernice | | |
| 1989 | Alexa | Dancer | | |
| 1989 | Fright House | Dr. Victoria Sedgewick | | |
| 1989 | Bedroom Eyes II | Gwendolyn | | |
| 1990 | Frankenhooker | Angel | | |
| 1990 | Club Fed | Girl at Pool | | |
| 1990 | Sexpot | Barbara | | |
| 1990 | Deadly Manor | Amanda | Alternate title: Savage Lust | |
| 1990 | New York's Finest | Loretta Michaels | | |
| 1991 | Suburban Commando | Girl (a.k.a. Hooker) | | |
| 1992 | Dead Boyz Can't Fly | Helen | | |
| 1996 | After the Silence | Sister Anne | Television film; also released as Breaking Through | |
| 1998 | Jay Jay the Jet Plane | Ms. Lee | US version | |
| 2018 | Furlough | AA Member with an Attitude | | |
| 2018 | Diane | Homeless Woman | | |
| 2019 | Driveways | Cheryl | | |
| 2019 | Crypto | Karaoke Singer | | |

=== Music videos ===
| Year | Song | Artist | Role | Ref. |
|---|---|---|---|---|
| 2016 | "LA Devotee" | Panic! at the Disco | Cult Leader | |

=== Theater ===
- Apples in Winter
