= Deadly Manor =

1990 film by José Ramón Larraz

- Promotional poster
- Directed by: José Ramón Larraz
- Screenplay by: Larry Ganem; José Ramón Larraz; Brian Smedley-Aston
- Produced by: Brian Smedley-Aston; Ángel Somolinos
- Starring: Clark Tufts; Greg Rhodes; Claudia Franjul; Mark Irish
- Cinematography: Tote Trenas
- Edited by: Sandi Gerling
- Music by: Cengiz Yaltkaya
- Production company: Castor Films
- Release date: December 5, 1992
- Running time: 86 minutes
- Countries: United States; Spain
- Language: English

Deadly Manor (also known as Savage Lust) is a 1990 Spanish-American slasher film directed by José Ramón Larraz and starring Clark Tufts, Greg Rhodes, and Claudia Franjul. It follows a group of teenagers who seek refuge in an abandoned mansion inhabited by a psychotic killer.

== Plot ==
Two couples—Tony and Helen, and Rod and Susan—are traveling via car through upstate New York to visit a lake, with their friends, couple Peter and Anne, following behind on a motorcycle. En route, the group pick up Jack, a hitchhiker who claims to be familiar with the area, but is in reality an escaped convict. As night falls and they fail to arrive at the lake, Rod decides to pull off onto a side road and camp overnight. At the end of the winding road, they come across an abandoned house and decide to spend the night there. In the yard, the group find a burned, damaged car oddly parked atop a stone monument. Inside is a photo of a beautiful young woman, along with articles of clothing; they determine it to be a bizarre shrine of some sort.

Helen finds the home profoundly frightening, and refuses to spend the night there; she leaves, telling the others she will go on to the nearest town, but is murdered in the woods by an unseen assailant. The group manage to break into the home, and begin exploring. In the basement, they find a number of sealed coffins, and more photos of the unknown woman pasted on the walls. Further evidence suggests someone has recently inhabited the home. They are further disturbed when they come across a closet full of mementos, including what appears to be a human scalp.

The group fall asleep in a parlor after starting a fire in the fireplace, the heat of which begins to cause a plaster wall to crack. Tony, unable to sleep, continues to explore the upstairs of the house. In a drawer, he comes across a photo album containing pictures of what appears to be nude corpses. Tony eventually falls asleep on a bed, where he dreams of having sex with the woman in the photographs. Tony returns to the basement, and finds one of the coffins, labeled "Amanda," open. Jack confronts Tony in the basement, accusing him of stealing items from the house. Tony goes outside and sits in the car atop the stone monument to smoke a cigarette.

Rod and Susan awake and go upstairs to have sex. When Rod goes outside to the car to retrieve condoms, he is attacked and killed. Moments later, Susan sees a woman wearing an expressionless white mask staring at her through the window. Susan subsequently has her throat slashed when she goes to find Rod. Meanwhile, Tony finds Helen's bloody corpse concealed inside the wrecked car. His screams awaken Peter and Anne, who find him crying over Helen's corpse outside. In the adjacent barn, the three find numerous vandalized motorcycles buried in hay, including Peter and Anne's. When Tony attempts to start his car, he finds it has been tampered with. Peter and Anne flee to the nearest road to flag down help, while Tony searches the house for Rod and Susan. He is confronted by a dying Jack in the stairwell, his throat slashed. Tony flees into the basement, where he is stabbed to death by the assailant.

Peter and Anne manage to flag down an aristocratic middle-aged man, Alfred, passing by in a car. When Anne notices yet another photo of the mysterious woman on the dashboard, Alfred stabs Peter in the throat with a hunting knife. Anne flees into the woods with Alfred in pursuit, and returns to the mansion. She discovers the bodies of Tony, Rod, and Susan. Upstairs, she is confronted by the killer—Amanda, the wife of Alfred and woman in the photos, who was horribly disfigured in a car accident caused by a reckless biker gang. Driven by vengeance over her disfigurement, she and Alfred trap and murder young people passing through the area.

Anne unsuccessfully attempts to reason with the psychotic Amanda, and is cornered by her and Alfred downstairs. In a struggle, the cracking plaster wall gives way, revealing a cache of corpses. Before Alfred can stab Anne, he is shot to death by police officers who have arrived at the mansion to arrest Jack, who had been spotted in the region. A distraught Anne and raving Amanda are escorted away from the house in separate police cars.

== Cast ==
- Clark Tufts as Jack
- Greg Rhodes as Tony
- Claudia Franjul as Helen
- Mark Irish as Rodney "Rod"
- Liz Hitchler as Susan
- Jerry Kernion as Peter
- Kathleen Patane as Anne
- Douglas Gowland as Trooper
- William Russell as Alfred
- Jennifer DeLora as Amanda

== Production ==
The film was shot on location at Hillburn Manor, a derelict 100-year-old mansion in Suffern, New York in the fall of 1989. The Davidson sisters, who inherited the home, resided in it while the film was shot over a period of five weeks. The crew consisted of approximately 35 people. The home, which was in a state of significant disrepair, was demolished after filming completed.

== Release ==
=== Home media ===
Arrow Video released Deadly Manor on Blu-ray on February 25, 2020.

== Sources ==
- Stine, Scott Aaron (2015) [2003]. The Gorehound's Guide to Splatter Films of the 1980s. Jefferson, North Carolina: McFarland. ISBN 978-1-476-61132-7.
