= Basket Case (film) =

1981 film by Frank Henenlotter

- Theatrical release poster
- Directed by: Frank Henenlotter
- Screenplay by: Frank Henenlotter
- Produced by: Arnold H. Bruck; Edgar Ievins; Tom Kaye
- Starring: Kevin Van Hentenryck; Terri Susan Smith; Beverly Bonner
- Cinematography: Bruce Torbet
- Edited by: Frank Henenlotter
- Music by: Gus Russo
- Production company: Basket Case Productions
- Distributed by: Analysis Film Releasing Corporation; Rugged Films; Creswin Distribution (Canada); Euro Space (Japan); Sinfonia Films (France)
- Release dates: December 31, 1981 (Premiere New York); April 2, 1982 (United States)
- Running time: 91 minutes
- Country: United States
- Language: English
- Budget: $35,000

Basket Case is a 1981 American horror film written and directed by Frank Henenlotter in his feature directorial debut. Produced by Edgar Ievins, the film stars Kevin Van Hentenryck as Duane Bradley, a young man who seeks vengeance on the doctors and nurses who performed an unwanted surgery that separated him from his deformed conjoined twin brother Belial, whom Duane hides in a large wicker basket.

Basket Case was shot on a "cp-16" camera on 16 mm in New York City, on a budget of around $35,000. The film was blown up to 35 mm for its original theatrical release on April 2, 1982. Receiving mixed reviews upon release, it has since become considered a cult film, and has spawned two sequels, Basket Case 2 (1990) and Basket Case 3: The Progeny (1991), both of which were also directed by Henenlotter.

In 2017, Basket Case was selected for preservation by the Museum of Modern Art (MoMA), which oversaw a restoration of the film from its original 16 mm camera negative. The 4K restoration was released on Blu-ray and DVD by Arrow Video in 2018.

== Plot ==
Dr. Julius Lifflander is frightened by something outside his country home near Glens Falls, New York. A shadowed creature then cuts his phone line and power before killing Lifflander by tearing at his face.

Duane Bradley arrives in New York City with a locked wicker basket. He gets a room at a cheap hotel right down the hall from a sex worker named Casey. He takes some hamburgers and feeds them to a creature in his basket which talks to him telepathically. When Duane is out the next day, a man named Brian O'Donovan looks through Duane's keyhole in order to steal Duane's wad of money. Casey scares him off and informs Duane about it. Duane takes his basket to see Dr. Harold Needleman and befriends his assistant Sharon. Needleman contacts Dr. Judith Kutter and tells her about Duane's visit and Lifflander's death, but she ignores him. Duane goes back to Needleman's that night and empties the creature, who is revealed to be his twin brother Belial, (Note: The name "Belial" has been noted as appearing in some Hebrew texts as a reference to the devil.) onto the floor. Belial kills Needleman by gutting him with his claws.

The next day, Duane goes to meet Sharon at the Statue of Liberty and they kiss. Belial senses this and trashes the hotel room in a temper tantrum. He hides when the hotel manager opens the door to see what the commotion is. O'Donovan sneaks inside to steal Duane's money but is killed by Belial when he opens the basket. Duane senses the attack telepathically and hurries back. Duane tells Belial that he deserves some time for himself. Duane, with the basket, runs into Casey at a bar and drunkenly tells her that Belial is his twin brother.

A flashback relates their backstory. They were conjoined at birth and their aunt was the only one who would take care of them. However, the twins were surgically separated at an early age by Dr. Lifflander, Dr. Needleman and Dr. Kutter, which explains their hatred for the doctors. They then murdered their father, which was ruled an accident, and lived with their aunt before she died. They then went to murder the doctors who had separated them. Belial deeply resents being cut off from his normal-looking brother, and Duane equally resents how heartless everyone acts towards his brother.

Back in the present day, Belial sneaks into Casey's bedroom and scares her out before stealing her panties. The next day, Duane and Belial go to Dr. Kutter's office. She tries to dismiss them, but Duane reveals who he is before Belial kills Kutter by shoving her face into a drawer of sharp objects. Sharon goes to Duane's apartment seeking safety after Needleman's death and they start to make love before a jealous Belial starts screaming and Duane is forced to toss Sharon outside.

That night Belial goes out to find Sharon while Duane has a dream that tells him about it. Belial sneaks into Sharon's apartment and tries to rape her. He attacks and kills her when she wakes up and screams. Enraged at his brother for his actions, Duane takes Belial back to the apartment in a scene that attracts several people to his hotel room, which exposes the existence of Belial. Belial attacks Duane and the two brothers fall from a hotel window onto the ground below, where onlookers gather around their bodies.

== Cast ==
- Kevin Van Hentenryck as Duane Bradley and Belial Bradley (voice; uncredited)
- Terri Susan Smith as Sharon
- Beverly Bonner as Casey
- Robert Vogel as Hotel Manager
- Lloyd Pace as Dr. Harold Needleman
- Bill Freeman as Dr. Julius Lifflander
- Diana Browne as Dr. Judith Kutter
- Joe Clarke as Brian "Mickey" O'Donovan
- Ruth Neuman as Duane's Aunt
- Richard Pierce as Duane's Father
- Sean McCabe as Young Duane
- Dorothy Strongin as Josephine
- Kerry Ruff as Detective
- Ilze Balodis as Social Worker
- Tom Robinson as Thief in Theater
- Chris Babson as Kutter's Date
- Maria T. Newland as Patient
- Florence Shultz and Mary Ellen Shultz as Nurses
- Constantine Scopas, Charles Stanley, Sydney Best, Johnny Ray Williams, Yousef Abuhamdeh, Lubi Kirsch, Catherine Russell and Mitchell Huval as Hotel Tenants
- Noel Hall as Drug Dealer
- Bruce Frankel as Second Detective
- Pat Ivers and Emily Armstrong as Street Girls
- Russell Fritz as Casey's John
- Jerry Butler as Casey Greeter (uncredited)
- Ken Clarke as Man with Dog in Waiting Room (uncredited)
- David Henenlotter as Kid at the Bar (uncredited)
- Frank Henenlotter as Theater Patron (uncredited)
- Bruce Torbet as Hotel Tenant (uncredited)

== Themes and interpretations ==
Author Jon Towlson wrote that the sexual desires of Belial in Basket Case provide the film with "a transgressive undercurrent", adding that Belial "can be seen as the id, the dark side within us all. Duane is the eternal misfit who carries his monster—his darkness—around in a basket, afraid to let it out for fear of transgression."

John Kenneth Muir argued that Basket Case examines the topic of abortion, highlighting a flashback scene that depicts Belial, "indisputably a life", being discarded in a trash bag: "[...] is a deformed monster such as Belial actually worth saving? Should he have been mercifully terminated rather than forced to live as he is, a thing more than a man? Basket Case hedges its bets and appears to come down on neither side of the pro-life/pro-choice equation. On the one hand, Belial is a murderous, nasty little bugger, but on the other, he's clearly capable of expressing love."

== Production ==
=== Development and filming ===
Writer-director Frank Henenlotter met producer Edgar Ievins during the production of the former's 1976 short film The Slash of the Knife, and the two eventually collaborated on an unrealized film project titled Ooze. Henenlotter recalled, "We tried to get the money for Ooze and couldn't, so I just wrote a film that could be made for far less money. Right out in front, I wrote a film that was designed to be made for a low, low budget." The resulting screenplay, Basket Case, was written by Henenlotter as he walked around Times Square, which he called a "seedy, wonderful atmosphere." He reportedly wrote the dialogue for the film on napkins while in the basement of a Nathan's Famous. Henenlotter was influenced by Herschell Gordon Lewis, dedicating the film to him.

Basket Case was shot on 16 mm film during long weekends throughout 1981. It had a budget of about $35,000, financed by a small production team largely with its own rental money to enable the film to be realized. It was shot in part on Manhattan's 42nd Street, with the Hotel Broslin scenes shot in his friend Ugis Nigals' loft. The hotel's hallways and rooms were made by Hennenlotter, Ievins and others. Additional filming locations included Franklin Street, Tribeca's Hubert Street, Liberty Island and the Hellfire Club. The film was edited at Phantasmagoria. Henenlotter did not have control over the post-production, and the result was dark, murky, and converted to a different aspect ratio.

=== Casting ===
Henenlotter's friend Ilze Balodis recruited students from the American Academy of Dramatic Arts to participate in the film's production, including Kevin Van Hentenryck, who was cast as Duane Bradley, and provided Belial's vocal effects in post-production. Van Hentenryck, actor Robert Vogel (who played the hotel manager), actress Diana Browne (who played Dr. Judith Kutter), and Balodis herself (who made a cameo appearance as a social worker) had previously worked on Slash of the Knife. Terri Susan Smith, who played Sharon, wore a wig since her head was shaved and she was part of the punk band The Tattooed Vegetables. Beverly Bonner was cast as Casey after Henenlotter saw her in the stage show Women Behind Bars. She would later do a stage show called Casey: 30 Years Later in 2012, set after the events of the film. Henenlotter's cousins Florence and Mary Ellen Shultz were cast as Kutter's nurses. Due to the film's low budget and its production running out of funding halfway through shooting, the remaining crew members took on multiple roles.

=== Special effects ===
The special effects for Belial consist largely of a puppet in some scenes and stop motion in others. Henenlotter wore a latex glove to use as Belial's hand in scenes where it is seen attacking his victims, and a scene where Belial reaches out of his basket towards the television, directing said scene while stuffed inside the dresser. The puppet was designed by Kevin Haney, modeled after a mold of Kevin Van Hentenryck's face, and operated by Henenlotter. It was used in scenes with an actor and where the eyes glow red. When the puppet shrunk and became impossible for Henenlotter or other crew members to operate, Ugis Nigals' daughter Kika filled in for a scene where Belial grasps at the air in a bed. The scenes with Belial's rampage and him crawling across the floor at night used stop motion animation, done by Henenlotter. The special makeup effects were done by Haney, John Caglione Jr. (who also designed the young Belial puppet), Ken Clark, Nigals and Ievins. One scene originally had Belial running through the streets of Manhattan, but due to the limitations of the puppet, it was changed into a dream scene where Duane runs nude through the streets. The scene was pitched to Van Hentenryck, who agreed to do it. It was shot without permits on a cold winter's night in February, with the sidewalks cleaned so that Van Hentenryck would not step on any objects. During the shooting of Sharon's death scene, Henenlotter poured blood over Terri Susan Smith's groin. The crew became offended and walked out of the production, leaving Henenlotter, Ievins and Van Hentenryck to finish the scene. For the scene where Duane and Belial are hanging from the Hotel Broslin sign, Van Hentenryck wore a harness inside his shirt that was bolted to the sign.

=== Music ===
The film's score was written and composed by Gus Russo, Harold "Clutch" Reiser, J. Keith Robinson, and Dave Maswick. The instruments used included an acoustic guitar, an electric Gibson guitar, a four-track tape deck, a Polymoog, an ARP String Ensemble, an Echoplex, a piano, a kazoo, a cello, chimes, a gong, a timpani, and vibraphones.

== Release ==
Basket Case was limited released on December 31, 1981 in New York. Months later it was released theatrically in the United States by Analysis Film Releasing Corporation beginning on April 2, 1982. Though filmed in 16 mm film, it was blown up to 35 mm for its original theatrical release. It played as a midnight movie for several years after this.

== Critical reception ==
=== Contemporary reviews ===
Diane Haithman of the Detroit Free Press gave Basket Case a score of seven out of ten, writing that, despite it being "gratuitously bloody", as well as "occasionally much, much sicker" in its themes than other low-budget horror films of the time, "somehow, there's something likable, even touching about it. And that's scary enough in itself. [...] It's like E.T. as written and directed by a psychopath." A reviewer for Variety called Basket Case "an ultra-cheap monster film [...] with a tongue-in-cheek approach", commending the performances but criticizing the audio recording, "grainy blowup from 16 mm", and score.

John Stark, writing for the San Francisco Examiner, lamented Basket Case as a "crudely made, low-budget work [that] lacks the outrageousness and campiness that an underground film needs." He characterized the film as "too preoccupied with its monster, a badly constructed special effect", and wrote that "the gore and hokey-looking beast keep deflating the film's clever premise."

A quotation by film critic Rex Reed ("This is the sickest movie ever made!") that was used in promotional materials for the film was not from any printed review. Reed had sought out the film after hearing negative reviews and was asked his opinion after emerging from the cinema. Unknown to Reed, the person who asked him was director Frank Henenlotter. Initially furious that his comment was used to promote the film, Reed eventually relented and granted permission.

=== Retrospective assessments ===
On the review aggregator website Rotten Tomatoes, Basket Case holds a 78% approval rating based on 27 critic reviews. The consensus reads: "While Basket Case definitely delivers all the gonzo gore promised by its cracked premise, it's really set apart by its rich vein of genuine pathos." Metacritic, which uses a weighted average, assigned the film a score of 77 out of 100, based on 5 critics, indicating "generally favorable" reviews.

In 2001, G. Noel Gross of DVD Talk gave Basket Case a rating of five out of five stars, calling it "an undeniable, unavoidable and unforgettable clasSICK". In 2003, author Scott Aaron Stine wrote of the film: "The innovation and verve this movie displays surpasses its innumerable shortcomings, all products of a film that qualified as destitute before the cameras even started rolling. The fact that most of the 'actors' had probably never stepped foot in front of a camera prior to this only adds to the movie's squalid charm; their talents may be slim, but their presence is priceless."

In 2007, Muir called the film "a fine, competent low-budget effort that generates thrills and discomfort not only from its tale of symbiotic (and separated) Siamese twins, but from its authentic sense of place. New York City has never felt more delightfully and dangerously squalid." Muir goes on to call it "oddly compelling, deeply disturbing and inexplicably touching".

In 2011, David Harley of Bloody Disgusting wrote that the film's "warped sense of humor and brazen attitude make it a blast to watch and, ultimately, one of the best horror comedies of the 1980s." That same year, Heather Wixson of Dread Central gave the film three-and-a-half out of five stars, referring to it as an "insane masterpiece that lovingly celebrates the sometimes schlocky and sleazy side of cinema". Patrick Naugle of DVD Verdict wrote, "The movie is just pure shock value" but "a heck of a lot of fun."

== 2017 restoration ==
"I'm both humbled and proud to announce that Basket Case is now part of the permanent film collection of the Museum of Modern Art. (And, yes, I asked them if they actually watched the film and they assured me they did.)"

— writer-director Frank Henenlotter, 2017

In March 2017, Basket Case was selected for preservation and restoration by the Museum of Modern Art (MoMA). Henenlotter provided MoMA with the film elements required for the restoration, including the original 16 mm camera negative from which the restoration would be sourced. In addition to the film's footage being restored in 4K resolution, its audio also underwent a restoration, using the original magnetic tracks of the sound mix as the source.

== Home media ==
Basket Case was released on Betamax and VHS by Media Home Entertainment. It was released on DVD in the United States by Image Entertainment in 1998. In 2001, a special edition DVD release of the film was issued by Something Weird Video.

On September 27, 2011, Something Weird Video released the film on Blu-ray. Henenlotter supervised the Blu-ray release himself, which features a restoration of the film taken from a 35 mm interpositive, with the original 16 mm negative (which had initially been thought lost) used as a reference.

In November 2017, it was announced that Arrow Video would be releasing Basket Case on Blu-ray and DVD, featuring the 4K restoration of the film overseen by MoMA. The release includes such bonus features as an audio commentary by Henenlotter and Van Hentenryck, interviews with members of the cast, a making-of featurette, and the 1976 Henenlotter-directed short film The Slash of the Knife. The Arrow Video release was issued on February 27, 2018.

== Remake ==
In 2026, a reimagining was announced to be in development at Coney Island Pictures, a new production company launched by Joe Bob Briggs in collaboration with Picturehouse. Henenlotter will be involved alongside his creative partner Anthony Sneed, who will direct.

== See also ==
- List of cult films

== Works cited ==
- Cunningham, Lisa (2012). ""What's in the Basket?": Sexualized and Sexualizing Violence in Frank Henenlotter's Basket Case". In Ritzenhoff, Karen A.; Randell, Karen (eds.). Screening the Dark Side of Love: From Euro-Horror to American Cinema. Palgrave Macmillan. pp. 145–157. ISBN 9781137096630.
