= Synapse Films =

American distribution label

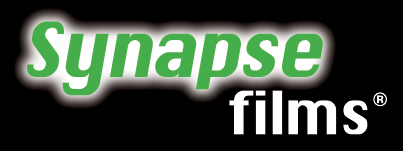
- Industry: Entertainment
- Founded: 1997; 29 years ago
- Headquarters: Romulus, Michigan, United States
- Products: Motion pictures
- Website: synapse-films.com

Synapse Films is an American DVD and Blu-ray label, founded in 1997 and specializes in cult horror, science fiction and exploitation films. It is considered a boutique DVD label.

== History ==
Synapse Films was owned and operated by Don May, Jr. and his business partners Jerry Chandler and Charles Fiedler, the catalyst being May's longstanding interest in and passion for TV and cinema. May explained, “I caught the laserdisc bug while working at a local laserdisc store while I was in college. I was selling laserdisc players and buying products, and I pretty much spent every extra dollar I had on laserdiscs. I loved movies and the disc format and knew this was a business I wanted to be in.” May became a part owner of Elite Entertainment after leaving his aforementioned job in laserdisc retail.

The Synapse catalog ranges from European horror touchstones like Vampyros Lesbos, and Castle of Blood to important genre documentaries including Roy Frumkes' Document of the Dead, from drive-in favorites like The Brain That Wouldn't Die to Leni Riefenstahl's Nazi film Triumph of the Will.

In 2004, Synapse released the controversial Thriller – A Cruel Picture on DVD, followed by a Blu-ray release in 2022. A competing 4K UHD release by Vinegar Syndrome was released later the same year, raising questions as to which company has a current and valid license to the title.

Detroit film scholar Nicholas Schlegel released his documentary The Synapse Story in its entirety on YouTube. The documentary details the history and vision of the label and its founders.

== Accolades ==
In 2016, film critic and author Maitland McDonagh was nominated for a Rondo Hatton Classic Horror Award for Best Commentary for her work on Synapse Films' DVD release of Dario Argento's film Tenebrae.
